= 2025 Oman Tri-Nation Series =

Ninth tri-nation series round in 2024-26 WCL2

The 2025 Oman Tri-Nation Series was the ninth round of the 2024–2026 Cricket World Cup League 2 cricket tournament that took place in Oman in February 2025. It was a tri-nation series contested by the men's national teams of Namibia, Oman and United States. The matches were played as One Day International (ODI) fixtures.

Following the ODI series, Oman and the United States played a three-match Twenty20 International (T20I) series against each other. United States won the series 3–0.

== League 2 series ==
2025 Oman Tri-Nation Series
- Part of 2024–2026 Cricket World Cup League 2
- Date: 8–18 February 2025
- Location: Oman
Teams
Namibia	Oman	United States
Captains
Gerhard Erasmus	Jatinder Singh	Monank Patel
Most runs
Zane Green (108)	Jatinder Singh (128)	Andries Gous (186)
Most wickets
Bernard Scholtz (12)	Shakeel Ahmed (13)	Milind Kumar (10)

=== Squads ===
Namibia	Oman	United States
Gerhard Erasmus (c); Jan Balt; Peter-Daniel Blignaut; Jack Brassell; Jan-Izak de Villiers; Shaun Fouché; Jan Frylinck; Zane Green (wk); Jean-Pierre Kotze (wk); Malan Kruger; Dylan Leicher; Jan Nicol Loftie-Eaton; Bernard Scholtz; Ben Shikongo; JJ Smit; Ruben Trumpelmann	Jatinder Singh (c, wk); Shakeel Ahmed; Wasim Ali; Hashir Dafedar; Muhammed Imran; Aamir Kaleem; Sufyan Mehmood; Hammad Mirza (wk); Mohammad Nadeem; Ashish Odedara; Jay Odedra; Jiten Ramanandi; Hassnain Shah; Samay Shrivastava; Vinayak Shukla (wk); Bukkapatnam Siddharth	Monank Patel (c, wk); Juanoy Drysdale; Andries Gous (wk); Shayan Jahangir (wk); Aaron Jones; Nosthush Kenjige; Sanjay Krishnamurthi; Milind Kumar; Yasir Mohammad; Saiteja Mukkamalla; Saurabh Netravalkar; Smit Patel (wk); Harmeet Singh; Jessy Singh; Shadley van Schalkwyk

=== Fixtures ===
==== 1st ODI ====
8 February 2025
10:00
Scorecard

United States; 293/8 (43 overs)	v	Namibia; 179 (40.2 overs)
Andries Gous 76 (83); JJ Smit 4/46 (9 overs)		Malan Kruger 32 (44); Milind Kumar 4/48 (9 overs)

United States won by 114 runs
Oman Cricket Academy Ground Turf 1, Al Amarat
Umpires: Rahul Asher (Oma) and Harikrishna Pillai (Oma)
Player of the match: Milind Kumar (USA)

- Namibia won the toss and elected to field.
- The match was reduced to 43 overs per side due to logistical issues.

==== 2nd ODI ====
10 February 2025
10:00
Scorecard

Namibia; 169 (46.3 overs)	v	Oman; 146 (37.2 overs)
Malan Kruger 39 (34); Samay Shrivastava 4/56 (10 overs)		Jatinder Singh 25 (36); Jan Nicol Loftie-Eaton 2/18 (5 overs)

Namibia won by 23 runs
Oman Cricket Academy Ground Turf 1, Al Amarat
Umpires: Bismillah Jan Shinwari (Afg) and Harikrishna Pillai (Oma)
Player of the match: Malan Kruger (Nam)

- Oman won the toss and elected to field.
- Hashir Dafedar, Hassnain Shah, Vinayak Shukla (Oma) and Jan Balt (Nam) all made their ODI debuts.

==== 3rd ODI ====
12 February 2025
10:00
Scorecard

United States; 151 (42.1 overs)	v	Oman; 152/3 (45.5 overs)
Saiteja Mukkamalla 80 (106); Shakeel Ahmed 4/26 (9.1 overs)		Jatinder Singh 82* (127); Harmeet Singh 2/20 (10 overs)

Oman won by 7 wickets
Oman Cricket Academy Ground Turf 1, Al Amarat
Umpires: Rahul Asher (Oma) and Bismillah Jan Shinwari (Afg)
Player of the match: Shakeel Ahmed (Oma)

- United States won the toss and elected to bat.

==== 4th ODI ====
14 February 2025
10:00
Scorecard

United States; 268/9 (50 overs)	v	Namibia; 198 (42.3 overs)
Andries Gous 83 (105); Bernard Scholtz 5/22 (10 overs)		Zane Green 65 (90); Saurabh Netravalkar 3/41 (8.3 overs)

United States won by 70 runs
Oman Cricket Academy Ground Turf 1, Al Amarat
Umpires: Rahul Asher (Oma) and Vinod Babu (Oma)
Player of the match: Andries Gous (USA)

- Namibia won the toss and elected to field.

==== 5th ODI ====
16 February 2025
10:00
Scorecard

Namibia; 96 (33.1 overs)	v	Oman; 100/8 (22.4 overs)
Jan Nicol Loftie-Eaton 30 (54); Shakeel Ahmed 4/25 (9 overs)		Aamir Kaleem 21 (33); Gerhard Erasmus 5/34 (7.4 overs)

Oman won by 2 wickets
Oman Cricket Academy Ground Turf 1, Al Amarat
Umpires: Bismillah Jan Shinwari (Afg) and Harikrishna Pillai (Oma)
Player of the match: Aamir Kaleem (Oma)

- Namibia won the toss and elected to bat.

==== 6th ODI ====
18 February 2025
10:00
Scorecard

United States; 122 (35.3 overs)	v	Oman; 65 (25.3 overs)
Milind Kumar 47* (82); Shakeel Ahmed 3/20 (8.3 overs)		Hammad Mirza 29 (43); Nosthush Kenjige 5/11 (7.3 overs)

United States won by 57 runs
Oman Cricket Academy Ground Turf 1, Al Amarat
Umpires: Rahul Asher (Oma) and Bismillah Jan Shinwari (Afg)
Player of the match: Milind Kumar (USA)

- Oman won the toss and elected to field.
- Jiten Ramanandi (Oma) made his ODI debut.
- Nosthush Kenjige (USA) took his first five-wicket haul in ODIs.
- Oman were dismissed for their lowest total in men's ODIs.
- This was the lowest total successfully defended in men's ODIs.
- This was the first completed men's ODI in which all deliveries were bowled by spinners.

== Oman v United States T20I series ==
United States men's cricket team in Oman in 2024–25
	Oman	United States
- Dates: 20 – 23 February 2025
Captains	Jatinder Singh	Monank Patel

Twenty20 International series
- Results: United States won the 3-match series 3–0
Most runs	Jatinder Singh (136)	Saiteja Mukkamalla (121)
Most wickets	Muhammed Imran (4)	Juanoy Drysdale (5)

=== Squads ===
Oman	United States
Jatinder Singh (c, wk); Shakeel Ahmed; Mujibur Ali; Wasim Ali; Muhammed Imran; Aamir Kaleem; Sufyan Mehmood; Hammad Mirza (wk); Mohammad Nadeem; Jiten Ramanandi; Bilal Shah; Hassnain Shah; Samay Shrivastava; Vinayak Shukla (wk); Bukkapatnam Siddharth	Monank Patel (c, wk); Juanoy Drysdale; Andries Gous (wk); ~~Shayan Jahangir (wk)~~; Aaron Jones; Nosthush Kenjige; Ali Khan; Sanjay Krishnamurthi; Milind Kumar; Yasir Mohammad; Saiteja Mukkamalla; Ali Sheikh; Harmeet Singh; ~~Jessy Singh~~; Steven Taylor; Stephen Wiig

Milind Kumar replaced Shayan Jahangir and Jessy Singh in the United States squad before the series began.

=== Fixtures ===
==== 1st T20I ====
20 February 2025
14:00
Scorecard

Oman; 190/5 (20 overs)	v	United States; 194/3 (19 overs)
Aamir Kaleem 72* (50); Harmeet Singh 3/37 (4 overs)		Saiteja Mukkamalla 100* (48); Aamir Kaleem 1/30 (3 overs)

United States won by 7 wickets
Oman Cricket Academy Ground Turf 1, Al Amarat
Umpires: Vinod Babu (Oma) and Harikrishna Pillai (Oma)
Player of the match: Saiteja Mukkamalla (USA)

- United States won the toss and elected to field.
- Mujibur Ali, Hassnain Shah (Oma) and Sanjay Krishnamurthi (USA) all made their T20I debuts.
- Saiteja Mukkamalla (USA) scored his first century in T20Is.

==== 2nd T20I ====
21 February 2025
18:00 (N)
Scorecard

Oman; 141/9 (20 overs)	v	United States; 142/6 (19.3 overs)
Jatinder Singh 57 (41); Ali Khan 3/23 (4 overs)		Monank Patel 73* (53); Muhammed Imran 3/23 (3.3 overs)

United States won by 4 wickets
Oman Cricket Academy Ground Turf 1, Al Amarat
Umpires: Rahul Asher (Oma) and Vinod Babu (Oma)
Player of the match: Monank Patel (USA)

- United States won the toss and elected to field.
- Muhammed Imran, Jiten Ramanandi (Oma), Ali Sheikh and Stephen Wiig (USA) all made their T20I debuts.

==== 3rd T20I ====
23 February 2025
14:00
Scorecard

Oman; 123 (20 overs)	v	United States; 127/2 (15.1 overs)
Jatinder Singh 51 (31); Juanoy Drysdale 3/18 (3 overs)		Milind Kumar 56* (38); Muhammed Imran 1/19 (2 overs)

United States won by 8 wickets
Oman Cricket Academy Ground Turf 1, Al Amarat
Umpires: Rahul Asher (Oma) and Harikrishna Pillai (Oma)
Player of the match: Milind Kumar (USA)

- Oman won the toss and elected to bat.
- Bilal Shah (Oma) made his T20I debut.
