= 2026 United States Tri-Nation Series =

22nd tri-nation series round in 2024-26 WCL2

- Part of 2024–2026 Cricket World Cup League 2
- Round 22
- Date: 3 – 13 October 2026
- Location: United States
Teams
Namibia	United Arab Emirates	United States
Captains
Gerhard Erasmus	Harpreet Singh	Monank Patel
Most runs
Michael van Lingen (206)	Muhammad Shahdad (215)	Shehan Jayasuriya (242)
Most wickets
JJ Smit (7)	Muhammad Arfan (3)	Ehsan Adil (6)

The 2026 United States Tri-Nation Series was the 22nd round of the 2024–2026 Cricket World Cup League 2 cricket tournament and took place in United States in October 2026. It was a tri-nation series contested by the men's national teams of Namibia, United Arab Emirates and the United States. All of the matches were played with One Day International (ODI) status.

== Squads ==
Namibia	United Arab Emirates	United States
Gerhard Erasmus (c); Jan Balt; Jack Brassell; Alexander Busing-Volschenk; Jan Frylinck; Zane Green (wk); Max Heingo; Malan Kruger; Jan Nicol Loftie-Eaton; Bernard Scholtz; JJ Smit; Waldo Smith; Louren Steenkamp; Junior Taanyanda; Ruben Trumpelmann; Michael van Lingen	Harpreet Singh (c); Ibrar Ahmad; Muhammad Arfan; Rahul Chopra; Basil Hameed; Aayan Afzal Khan; Sohaib Khan; Ayaan Misbah; Ali Naseer; Akshdeep Nath; Awais Ali Shah; Muhammad Shahdad; Tanish Suri (wk); Khuzaima Tanveer; Adeeb Usmani (wk)	Monank Patel (c); Saiteja Mukkamalla (vc); Ehsan Adil; ~~Ali Khan~~; Shayan Jahangir; Shehan Jayasuriya; Nosthush Kenjige; Hassan Khan; Sanjay Krishnamurthi; Milind Kumar; Yasir Mohammad; Saurabh Netravalkar; Smit Patel (wk); Shubham Ranjane; Harmeet Singh; Jessy Singh

Ali Khan was ruled out due to injury and was replaced in the United States squad by Hassan Khan.

== Fixtures ==
=== 1st ODI ===
3 October 2026
11:00
Scorecard

Namibia; 9/0 (2 overs)	v	United Arab Emirates
Jan Frylinck 2* (9)

No result
Grand Prairie Stadium, Grand Prairie
Umpires: Jermaine Lindo (USA) and Vijaya Mallela (USA)

- United Arab Emirates won the toss and elected to field.
- The match was reduced to 20 overs per side due to rain.
- No further play was possible due to rain.

=== 2nd ODI ===
5 October 2026
11:00
Scorecard

United Arab Emirates; 330/8 (50 overs)	v	United States; 332/4 (48.5 overs)
Muhammad Shahdad 114 (107); Harmeet Singh 4/65 (10 overs)		Milind Kumar 116* (84); Muhammad Shahdad 1/32 (5 overs)

United States won by 6 wickets
Grand Prairie Stadium, Grand Prairie
Umpires: Deighton Butler (WI) and Aditya Gajjar (USA)
Player of the match: Milind Kumar (USA)

- United States won the toss and elected to field.
- Shehan Jayasuriya played his first ODI for United States after having previously played 12 ODIs for Sri Lanka, becoming the 17th cricketer to represent two international teams in men's ODIs.
- Muhammad Shahdad (UAE) scored his maiden century in ODIs.

=== 3rd ODI ===
7 October 2026
11:00
Scorecard

Namibia; 298/9 (50 overs)	v	United States; 299/6 (48.5 overs)
Michael van Lingen 124 (121); Ehsan Adil 4/41 (8 overs)		Monank Patel 108 (100); Jan Nicol Loftie-Eaton 2/39 (6 overs)

United States won by 4 wickets
Grand Prairie Stadium, Grand Prairie
Umpires: Deighton Butler (WI) and Jermaine Lindo (USA)
Player of the match: Monank Patel (USA)

- Namibia won the toss and elected to bat.

=== 4th ODI ===
9 October 2026
11:00
Scorecard

United Arab Emirates; 134 (37.3 overs)	v	Namibia; 135/2 (26 overs)
Tanish Suri 29 (22); JJ Smit 4/29 (10 overs)		Michael van Lingen 71 (83); Ali Naseer 1/29 (5 overs)

Namibia won by 8 wickets
Grand Prairie Stadium, Grand Prairie
Umpires: Aditya Gajjar (USA) and Vijaya Mallela (USA)
Player of the match: JJ Smit (Nam)

- Namibia won the toss and elected to field.

=== 5th ODI ===
11 October 2026
11:00
Scorecard

United Arab Emirates; 213 (46.3 overs)	v	United States; 214/5 (38.4 overs)
Muhammad Shahdad 79 (105); Shubham Ranjane 4/39 (10 overs)		Shehan Jayasuriya 83 (95); Muhammad Arfan 3/38 (10 overs)

United States won by 5 wickets
Grand Prairie Stadium, Grand Prairie
Umpires: Deighton Butler (WI) and Jermaine Lindo (USA)
Player of the match: Shubham Ranjane (USA)

- United States won the toss and elected to field.
- Hassan Khan (USA) and Awais Ali Shah (UAE) both made their ODI debuts.

=== 6th ODI ===
13 October 2026
11:00
Scorecard

United States; 277/7 (50 overs)	v	Namibia; 278/4 (48.3 overs)
Shehan Jayasuriya 76 (99); Bernard Scholtz 2/39 (6 overs)		Louren Steenkamp 102 (114); Harmeet Singh 1/44 (8.3 overs)

Namibia won by 6 wickets
Grand Prairie Stadium, Grand Prairie
Umpires: Deighton Butler (WI) and Vijaya Mallela (USA)
Player of the match: Louren Steenkamp (Nam)

- Namibia won the toss and elected to field.
- Gerhard Erasmus became the first Namibian batter to score 2,500 run in ODIs.
