= 2024 Namibia Tri-Nation Series =

Fifth tri-nation series round in 2024-26 WCL2

The 2024 Namibia Tri-Nation Series was the fifth round of the 2024–2026 Cricket World Cup League 2 cricket tournament that took place in Namibia in September and October 2024. The tri-nation series was contested by the men's national teams of Namibia, United Arab Emirates and United States. The matches were played as One Day International (ODI) fixtures. Ahead of the series, the UAE Falcons played some warm-up fixtures against Namibia A.

Following the ODI series, the three sides played a Twenty20 International (T20I) tri-nation series. United Arab Emirates won the series after winning three of their four matches, topping the points table.

== Tour matches ==
8 September 2024
10:30
Scorecard

UAE Falcons; 265/8 (50 overs)	v	Namibia A 266/5 (47.4 overs)
Vriitya Aravind 47 (64); Simon Shikongo 2/22 (6 overs)		Jan Nicol Loftie-Eaton 90* (66); Rahul Bhatia 2/40 (7.4 overs)

Namibia A won by 5 wickets
Namibia Cricket Ground, Windhoek
Umpires: Edgris Baron (Nam) and Ewoud Lassen (Nam)
Player of the match: Jan Nicol Loftie-Eaton (Namibia A)

- Namibia A won the toss and elected to field.

10 September 2024
10:30
Scorecard

UAE Falcons; 208/9 (50 overs)	v	Namibia A 213/6 (45 overs)
Vriitya Aravind 99* (124); Shaun Fouché 3/39 (10 overs)		Jan Frylinck 45 (38); Akif Raja 3/61 (9 overs)

Namibia A won by 4 wickets
Namibia Cricket Ground, Windhoek
Umpires: Edgris Baron (Nam) and Jan Prinsloo (Nam)
Player of the match: Vriitya Aravind (UAE Falcons)

- UAE Falcons won the toss and elected to bat.

12 September 2024
10:30
Scorecard

Namibia A 188 (46.5 overs)	v	UAE Falcons; 189/3 (40.5 overs)
Shaun Fouché 37 (74); Rahul Bhatia 3/21 (10 overs)		Vishnu Sukumaran 74* (73); Jan Balt 1/13 (7 overs)

UAE Falcons won by 7 wickets
Namibia Cricket Ground, Windhoek
Umpires: Andre Maasz (Nam) and Herman Rust (Nam)
Player of the match: Vishnu Sukumaran (UAE Falcons)

- UAE Falcons won the toss and elected to field.

14 September 2024
10:30
Scorecard

Namibia A 253 (49.5 overs)	v	UAE Falcons; 254/1 (43 overs)
Jan Nicol Loftie-Eaton 61 (70); Sanchit Sharma 3/31 (9 overs)		Dhruv Parashar 103* (136); Peter-Daniel Blignaut 1/38 (8 overs)

UAE Falcons won by 9 wickets
Namibia Cricket Ground, Windhoek
Umpires: Andre Maasz (Nam) and Jan Prinsloo (Nam)
Player of the match: Dhruv Parashar (UAE Falcons)

- Namibia A won the toss and elected to bat.

== League 2 series ==
2024 Namibia Tri-Nation Series
- Part of 2024–2026 Cricket World Cup League 2
- Date: 16–26 September 2024
- Location: Namibia
Teams
Namibia	United Arab Emirates	United States
Captains
Gerhard Erasmus	Muhammad Waseem	Monank Patel
Most runs
Michael van Lingen (246)	Vishnu Sukumaran (136)	Saiteja Mukkamalla (245)
Most wickets
Jan Nicol Loftie-Eaton (5) Tangeni Lungameni (5)	Ali Naseer (4)	Nosthush Kenjige (7); Jessy Singh (7); Saurabh Netravalkar (7)

=== Squads ===
Namibia	United Arab Emirates	United States
Gerhard Erasmus (c); Peter-Daniel Blignaut; Jack Brassell; Jan-Izak de Villiers; Shaun Fouché; Jan Frylinck; Zane Green (wk); Jean-Pierre Kotze (wk); Malan Kruger; Dylan Leicher; Jan Nicol Loftie-Eaton; Tangeni Lungameni; Bernard Scholtz; Ben Shikongo; JJ Smit; Michael van Lingen	Muhammad Waseem (c); Rahul Bhatia; Rahul Chopra (wk); Muhammad Farooq; Syed Haider (wk); Basil Hameed; Muhammad Jawadullah; Aayan Afzal Khan; Asif Khan; Ali Naseer; Junaid Siddique; Omid Shafi Rahman; Alishan Sharafu; Aryansh Sharma (wk); Vishnu Sukumaran	Monank Patel (c, wk); Juanoy Drysdale; Andries Gous (wk); Shayan Jahangir (wk); Nosthush Kenjige; Milind Kumar; Sushant Modani; Yasir Mohammad; Saiteja Mukkamalla; Saurabh Netravalkar; Smit Patel (wk); Harmeet Singh; Jessy Singh; Utkarsh Srivastava; Shadley van Schalkwyk

=== Fixtures ===
==== 1st ODI ====
16 September 2024
09:30
Scorecard

Namibia; 199/9 (50 overs)	v	United States; 200/4 (41.3 overs)
Jan Frylinck 70 (88); Juanoy Drysdale 2/16 (6 overs)		Monank Patel 72 (82); Gerhard Erasmus 2/34 (8 overs)

United States won by 6 wickets
United Ground, Windhoek
Umpires: Andrew Louw (Nam) and Bismillah Jan Shinwari (Afg)
Player of the match: Monank Patel (USA)

- United States won the toss and elected to field.

==== 2nd ODI ====
18 September 2024
09:30
Scorecard

United Arab Emirates; 106 (31.2 overs)	v	United States; 107/0 (15.5 overs)
Rahul Chopra 32 (64); Jessy Singh 4/18 (5 overs)		Andries Gous 66* (54)

United States won by 10 wickets
United Ground, Windhoek
Umpires: Andrew Louw (Nam) and Claus Schumacher (Nam)
Player of the match: Jessy Singh (USA)

- United States won the toss and elected to field.
- Andries Gous (USA) made his ODI debut.

==== 3rd ODI ====
20 September 2024
09:30
Scorecard

Namibia; 313 (50 overs)	v	United Arab Emirates; 316/9 (49.3 overs)
Michael van Lingen 107 (85); Ali Naseer 3/57 (10 overs)		Vishnu Sukumaran 97 (90); Jan Nicol Loftie-Eaton 4/79 (8.3 overs)

United Arab Emirates won by 1 wicket
United Ground, Windhoek
Umpires: Claus Schumacher (Nam) and Bismillah Jan Shinwari (Afg)
Player of the match: Vishnu Sukumaran (UAE)

- United Arab Emirates won the toss and elected to field.

==== 4th ODI ====
22 September 2024
09:30
Scorecard

Namibia; 286/9 (50 overs)	v	United States; 287/3 (45 overs)
Michael van Lingen 67 (44); Shadley van Schalkwyk 4/59 (10 overs)		Andries Gous 81 (68); Peter-Daniel Blignaut 1/28 (4 overs)

United States won by 7 wickets
United Ground, Windhoek
Umpires: Andrew Louw (Nam) and Bismillah Jan Shinwari (Afg)
Player of the match: Andries Gous (USA)

- Namibia won the toss and elected to bat.
- Peter-Daniel Blignaut and Dylan Leicher (Nam) both made their ODI debuts.

==== 5th ODI ====
24 September 2024
09:30
Scorecard

United States; 339/4 (50 overs)	v	United Arab Emirates; 203 (36.2 overs)
Milind Kumar 155* (110); Aayan Afzal Khan 2/49 (10 overs)		Rahul Chopra 52 (44); Saurabh Netravalkar 3/32 (7 overs)

United States won by 136 runs
United Ground, Windhoek
Umpires: Andrew Louw (Nam) and Claus Schumacher (Nam)
Player of the match: Milind Kumar (USA)

- United Arab Emirates won the toss and elected to field.
- Omid Shafi Rahman (UAE) made his ODI debut.
- Milind Kumar (USA) scored his first century in ODIs.

==== 6th ODI ====
26 September 2024
09:30
Scorecard

United Arab Emirates; 190 (43.2 overs)	v	Namibia; 194/2 (28.5 overs)
Ali Naseer 61 (62); JJ Smit 3/50 (8.2 overs)		Michael van Lingen 67 (43); Vishnu Sukumaran 1/20 (3 overs)

Namibia won by 8 wickets
United Ground, Windhoek
Umpires: Claus Schumacher (Nam) and Bismillah Jan Shinwari (Afg)
Player of the match: Michael van Lingen (Nam)

- Namibia won the toss and elected to field.
- Muhammad Farooq (UAE) made his ODI debut.

== T20I series ==
2024 Namibia T20I Tri-Nation Series
- Date: 29 September – 5 October 2024
- Location: Namibia
- Result: United Arab Emirates won the series
Teams
Namibia	United Arab Emirates	United States
Captains
Gerhard Erasmus	Muhammad Waseem	Monank Patel (Note: Jessy Singh captained United States in all their matches of the series.)
Most runs
Gerhard Erasmus (116)	Muhammad Waseem (159)	Andries Gous (153)
Most wickets
Gerhard Erasmus (6)	Muhammad Jawadullah (9)	Nosthush Kenjige (7)

=== Squads ===
Namibia	United Arab Emirates	United States
Gerhard Erasmus (c); Jan Balt; Peter-Daniel Blignaut; Jack Brassell; Alexander Busing-Volschenk; Jan-Izak de Villiers; Shaun Fouché; Jan Frylinck; Zane Green (wk); Jean-Pierre Kotze (wk); Malan Kruger; Dylan Leicher; Jan Nicol Loftie-Eaton; Tangeni Lungameni; Bernard Scholtz; Ben Shikongo; JJ Smit	Muhammad Waseem (c); Rahul Bhatia; Rahul Chopra (wk); Muhammad Farooq; Syed Haider (wk); Basil Hameed; Muhammad Jawadullah; Aayan Afzal Khan; Asif Khan; Ali Naseer; Junaid Siddique; Omid Shafi Rahman; Alishan Sharafu; Aryansh Sharma (wk); Vishnu Sukumaran	Monank Patel (c, wk); Ayan Desai; Juanoy Drysdale; Andries Gous (wk); Shayan Jahangir (wk); Nosthush Kenjige; Milind Kumar; Nitish Kumar; Yasir Mohammad; Saiteja Mukkamalla; Abhishek Paradkar; Smit Patel (wk); Harmeet Singh; Jessy Singh; Utkarsh Srivastava; Shadley van Schalkwyk

=== Points table ===
Pos	Team	Pld	W	L	T	NR	Pts	NRR
1	United Arab Emirates	4	3	1	0	0	6	1.074
2	United States	4	3	1	0	0	6	0.843
3	Namibia	4	0	4	0	0	0	−1.996

Source: ESPNcricinfo

=== Fixtures ===
29 September 2024
14:00
Scorecard

United Arab Emirates; 245/2 (20 overs)	v	Namibia; 205/8 (20 overs)
Muhammad Waseem 89* (50); Gerhard Erasmus 2/26 (3 overs)		Jean-Pierre Kotze 55 (32); Muhammad Jawadullah 2/29 (3.1 overs)

United Arab Emirates won by 40 runs
Wanderers Cricket Ground, Windhoek
Umpires: Andrew Louw (Nam) and Claus Schumacher (Nam)
Player of the match: Muhammad Waseem (UAE)

- Namibia won the toss and elected to field.
- Jan-Izak de Villiers (Nam) made his T20I debut.
- Muhammad Waseem (UAE) scored his 2,000th run in T20Is.

30 September 2024
14:00
Scorecard

United States; 175/9 (20 overs)	v	United Arab Emirates; 160/8 (20 overs)
Saiteja Mukkamalla 85 (54); Ali Naseer 4/26 (4 overs)		Basil Hameed 44* (26); Abhishek Paradkar 3/24 (4 overs)

United States won by 15 runs
Wanderers Cricket Ground, Windhoek
Umpires: Ewoud Lassen (Nam) and Claus Schumacher (Nam)
Player of the match: Saiteja Mukkamalla (USA)

- United States won the toss and elected to bat.
- Ayan Desai, Abhishek Paradkar and Smit Patel (USA) all made their T20I debuts.

1 October 2024
14:00
Scorecard

United States; 181/4 (20 overs)	v	Namibia; 168/8 (20 overs)
Andries Gous 81 (50); Jack Brassell 2/42 (4 overs)		Gerhard Erasmus 77 (49); Nosthush Kenjige 3/34 (4 overs)

United States won by 13 runs
Wanderers Cricket Ground, Windhoek
Umpires: Ewoud Lassen (Nam) and Andrew Louw (Nam)
Player of the match: Andries Gous (USA)

- United States won the toss and elected to bat.

2 October 2024
14:00
Scorecard

Namibia; 110/6 (20 overs)	v	United Arab Emirates; 111/4 (14.1 overs)
Zane Green 52* (35); Muhammad Jawadullah 2/24 (4 overs)		Asif Khan 48 (30); Bernard Scholtz 2/19 (4 overs)

United Arab Emirates won by 6 wickets
Wanderers Cricket Ground, Windhoek
Umpires: Andrew Louw (Nam) and Claus Schumacher (Nam)
Player of the match: Asif Khan (UAE)

- Namibia won the toss and elected to bat.

4 October 2024
14:00
Scorecard

United Arab Emirates; 170/5 (20 overs)	v	United States; 164 (19.4 overs)
Muhammad Waseem 50 (30); Nosthush Kenjige 2/32 (4 overs)		Shayan Jahangir 61 (32); Basil Hameed 4/25 (4 overs)

United Arab Emirates won by 6 runs
Wanderers Cricket Ground, Windhoek
Umpires: Ewoud Lassen (Nam) and Claus Schumacher (Nam)
Player of the match: Basil Hameed (UAE)

- United Arab Emirates won the toss and elected to bat.
- Utkarsh Srivastava (USA) made his T20I debut.

5 October 2024
14:00
Scorecard

Namibia; 120/9 (20 overs)	v	United States; 124/4 (15.1 overs)
Shaun Fouché 40* (43); Milind Kumar 5/16 (4 overs)		Andries Gous 37 (19); Gerhard Erasmus 3/23 (4 overs)

United States won by 6 wickets
Wanderers Cricket Ground, Windhoek
Umpires: Ewoud Lassen (Nam) and Andrew Louw (Nam)
Player of the match: Milind Kumar (USA)

- Namibia won the toss and elected to bat.
- Alexander Busing-Volschenk (Nam) made his T20I debut.
- Milind Kumar (USA) took his first five-wicket haul in T20Is.
