= United States at the Men's T20 World Cup =

United States national team performance at T20 World Cup

The United States national cricket team is one of the associate members of the International Cricket Council (ICC). United States qualified for their maiden T20 World Cup in 2024 as co-hosts along with West Indies. The team successfully made it past the group stage to reach the Super 8 stage, during the group stage they managed to tie the match against Pakistan which they moved on to win in the super over. By reaching the second stage, they qualified automatically for the 2026 edition.

== T20 World Cup record ==
ICC T20 World Cup record										Qualification record (Note: WCL Division One served as the qualifier for the 2007 edition.)				
Year	Round	Position	Pld	W	L	T	NR	Ab (Note: Abandoned matches are not counted in the official records.)	Captain	Pld	W	L	T	NR
(South Africa) 2007	Did not qualify									Did not participate				
(England) 2009	Did not qualify									Did not participate				
(Cricket West Indies) 2010	Did not qualify									3	1	2	0	0
(Sri Lanka) 2012	Did not qualify									14	7	7	0	0
(Bangladesh) 2014	Did not qualify									16	10	5	0	1
(India) 2016	Did not qualify									12	7	5	0	0
(United Arab Emirates) (Oman) 2021	Did not qualify									12	7	5	0	0
(Australia) 2022	Did not qualify									11	8	3	0	0
(United States) (Cricket West Indies) 2024	Super 8	8/20	7	1	4	1	0	1	Monank Patel	Did not participate (qualified automatically as co-hosts)				
(India) (Sri Lanka) 2026	Group stage	10/20	4	2	2	0	0	0	Monank Patel	Did not participate (qualified automatically)				
Total	0 Titles	2/10	11	3	6	1	0	1	—N/a	68	40	27	0	1

=== Record by opponents ===
Opponent	M	W	L	T+W	T+L	NR	Ab	Win %	First played
Canada	1	1	0	0	0	0	0	100	2024
England	1	0	1	0	0	0	0	0.00	2024
India	2	0	2	0	0	0	0	0.00	2024
Ireland	1	0	0	0	0	0	1	—	2024
Namibia	1	1	0	0	0	0	0	100	2026
Netherlands	1	1	0	0	0	0	0	100	2026
Pakistan	2	0	1	1	0	0	0	50.00	2024
South Africa	1	0	1	0	0	0	0	0.00	2024
West Indies	1	0	1	0	0	0	0	0.00	2024
Total	11	3	6	1	0	0	1	33.33	—N/a
Source: Last Updated: 15 February 2026

== Tournament results ==
=== United States & West Indies 2024 ===
Squad and kit

- Monank Patel (c)
- Corey Anderson
- Andries Gous (wk)
- Aaron Jones
- Steven Taylor
- Saurabh Netravalkar
- Jessy Singh
- Harmeet Singh
- Nosthush Kenjige
- Shadley van Schalkwyk
- Nitish Kumar
- Shayan Jahangir
- Ali Khan
- Nisarg Patel
- Milind Kumar

2024 kit

Results

Group stage (Group A)					Super 8 (Group 2)				Semifinal	Final	Overall Result
Opposition Result	Opposition Result	Opposition Result	Opposition Result	Rank	Opposition Result	Opposition Result	Opposition Result	Rank	Opposition Result	Opposition Result	Overall Result
Canada; W by 7 wickets	Pakistan; Tied (W the S/O)	India; L by 7 wickets	Ireland; Match abandoned	2	South Africa; L by 18 runs	West Indies; L by 9 wickets	England; L by 10 wickets	4	Did not advance		Super 8
Source: Cricinfo

Scorecards

Group stage (Group A)

1 June 2024
19:30 UTC−5 (N)
Scorecard

Canada; 194/5 (20 overs)	v	United States; 197/3 (17.4 overs)
Navneet Dhaliwal 61 (44); Harmeet Singh 1/27 (4 overs)		Aaron Jones 94* (40); Dillon Heyliger 1/19 (3 overs)

United States won by 7 wickets
Grand Prairie Stadium, Dallas
Umpires: Richard Illingworth (Eng) and Sharfuddoula (Ban)
Player of the match: Aaron Jones (USA)

- United States won the toss and elected to field.
- This was the first World Cup match victory for the United States across all formats.

6 June 2024
10:30 UTC−5
Scorecard

Pakistan; 159/7 (20 overs)	v	United States; 159/3 (20 overs)
Babar Azam 44 (43); Nosthush Kenjige 3/30 (4 overs)		Monank Patel 50 (38); Mohammad Amir 1/25 (4 overs)

Match tied (United States won the Super Over)
Grand Prairie Stadium, Dallas
Umpires: Michael Gough (Eng) and Allahudien Paleker (SA)
Player of the match: Monank Patel (USA)

- United States won the toss and elected to field.
- This was United States's first win against Pakistan in T20Is.
- Super Over: United States 18/1, Pakistan 13/1

12 June 2024
10:30 UTC−4
Scorecard

United States; 110/8 (20 overs)	v	India; 111/3 (18.2 overs)
Nitish Kumar 27 (23); Arshdeep Singh 4/9 (4 overs)		Suryakumar Yadav 50* (49); Saurabh Netravalkar 2/18 (4 overs)

India won by 7 wickets
Nassau County International Cricket Stadium, East Meadow
Umpires: Sam Nogajski (Aus) and Paul Reiffel (Aus)
Player of the match: Arshdeep Singh (Ind)

- India won the toss and elected to field.

14 June 2024
10:30 UTC−4
Scorecard

United States	v	Ireland

Match abandoned
Central Broward Park, Lauderhill
Umpires: Sharfuddoula (Ban) and Rod Tucker (Aus)

- No toss.
- No play was possible because of rain.
- United States qualified for the Super 8 as a result of this match.

Super 8 (Group 2)

19 June 2024
10:30 UTC−4
Scorecard

South Africa; 194/4 (20 overs)	v	United States; 176/6 (20 overs)
Quinton de Kock 74 (40); Saurabh Netravalkar 2/21 (4 overs)		Andries Gous 80* (47); Kagiso Rabada 3/18 (4 overs)

South Africa won by 18 runs
Sir Vivian Richards Stadium, North Sound
Umpires: Chris Gaffaney (NZ) and Richard Kettleborough (Eng)
Player of the match: Quinton de Kock (SA)

- United States won the toss and elected to field.

21 June 2024
20:30 UTC−4 (N)
Scorecard

United States; 128 (19.5 overs)	v	West Indies; 130/1 (10.5 overs)
Andries Gous 29 (16); Roston Chase 3/19 (4 overs)		Shai Hope 82* (39); Harmeet Singh 1/18 (2 overs)

West Indies won by 9 wickets
Kensington Oval, Bridgetown
Umpires: Allahudien Paleker (SA) and Paul Reiffel (Aus)
Player of the match: Roston Chase (WI)

- West Indies won the toss and elected to field.

23 June 2024
10:30 UTC−4
Scorecard

United States; 115 (18.5 overs)	v	England; 117/0 (9.4 overs)
Nitish Kumar 30 (24); Chris Jordan 4/10 (2.5 overs)		Jos Buttler 83* (38)

England won by 10 wickets
Kensington Oval, Bridgetown
Umpires: Chris Gaffaney (NZ) and Joel Wilson (WI)
Player of the match: Adil Rashid (Eng)

- England won the toss and elected to field.
- United States were eliminated as a result of this match.

=== India & Sri Lanka 2026 ===
Squad and kit

- Monank Patel (c, wk)
- Saiteja Mukkamalla
- Milind Kumar
- Saurabh Netravalkar
- Shubham Ranjane
- Sanjay Krishnamurthi
- Harmeet Singh
- Shayan Jahangir (wk)
- Shehan Jayasuriya
- Ali Khan
- Nosthush Kenjige
- Andries Gous (wk)
- Mohammad Mohsin
- Shadley van Schalkwyk
- Ehsan Adil
- Note: Jessy Singh was replaced by Ehsan Adil due to an injury.

2026 kit

Results

Group stage (Group A)					Super 8		Semifinal	Final	Overall Result
Opposition Result	Opposition Result	Opposition Result	Opposition Result	Rank	Opposition Result	Rank	Opposition Result	Opposition Result	Overall Result
India; L by 29 runs	Pakistan; L by 32 runs	Netherlands; W by 93 runs	Namibia; W by 31 runs	3	Did not advance				Group stage
Source: Cricinfo

Scorecards

Group stage (Group A)

Match 3
7 February 2026
19:00 UTC+5:30 (N)
Scorecard

India; 161/9 (20 overs)	v	United States; 132/8 (20 overs)
Suryakumar Yadav 84* (49); Shadley van Schalkwyk 4/25 (4 overs)		Shubham Ranjane 37 (22); Mohammed Siraj 3/29 (4 overs)

India won by 29 runs
Wankhede Stadium, Mumbai
Attendance: 28,726
Umpires: Paul Reiffel (Aus) and Rod Tucker (Aus)
Player of the match: Suryakumar Yadav (Ind)

- United States won the toss and elected to field.
- Mohammad Mohsin and Shubham Ranjane (USA) both made their T20I debuts.
- Saurabh Netravalkar (USA) surpassed Sanath Jayasuriya's record for conceding the most runs in a T20 World Cup innings (0–65).
- This was India's ninth consecutive win in the T20 World Cup, the longest winning streak in the tournament.
- Suryakumar Yadav (Ind) surpassed Virat Kohli's record for the most player of the match awards by an Indian in T20Is (17).

Match 12
10 February 2026
19:00 UTC+5:30 (N)
Scorecard

Pakistan; 190/9 (20 overs)	v	United States; 158/8 (20 overs)
Sahibzada Farhan 73 (41); Shadley van Schalkwyk 4/25 (4 overs)		Shubham Ranjane 51 (30); Usman Tariq 3/27 (4 overs)

Pakistan won by 32 runs
Sinhalese Sports Club Cricket Ground, Colombo
Umpires: Richard Illingworth (Eng) and Raveendra Wimalasiri (SL)
Player of the match: Sahibzada Farhan (Pak)

- United States won the toss and elected to field.
- Ehsan Adil (USA) made his T20I debut.
- Shaheen Afridi (Pak) played in his 100th T20I match.
- Sahibzada Farhan (Pak) scored his 1,000th run in T20Is.

Match 21
13 February 2026
19:00 UTC+5:30 (N)
Scorecard

United States; 196/6 (20 overs)	v	Netherlands; 103 (15.5 overs)
Saiteja Mukkamalla 79 (51); Bas de Leede 3/37 (4 overs)		Bas de Leede 23 (17); Harmeet Singh Baddhan 4/21 (4 overs)

United States won by 93 runs
M. A. Chidambaram Stadium, Chennai
Attendance: 18,955
Umpires: K. N. Ananthapadmanabhan (Ind) and Nitin Menon (Ind)
Player of the match: Harmeet Singh Baddhan (USA)

- Netherlands won the toss and elected to field.
- This was the largest winning margin in a T20 World Cup match by an associate nation.

Match 26
15 February 2026
15:00 UTC+5:30 (D/N)
Scorecard

United States; 199/4 (20 overs)	v	Namibia; 168/6 (20 overs)
Sanjay Krishnamurthi 68* (33); Willem Myburgh 2/22 (4 overs)		Louren Steenkamp 58 (39); Shadley van Schalkwyk 2/30 (4 overs)

United States won by 31 runs
M. A. Chidambaram Stadium, Chennai
Umpires: K. N. Ananthapadmanabhan (Ind) and Sharfuddoula (Ban)
Player of the match: Sanjay Krishnamurthi (USA)

- United States won the toss and elected to bat.
- Monank Patel (USA) became the first player for the United States to score 1000 runs in T20Is.
- Zane Green (Nam) became the first player to be retired out in the 2026 tournament and second overall in the T20 World Cup history.
- Namibia were eliminated as a result of this match.

== Records and statistics ==
=== Team records ===
Highest innings totals

Score	Opponent	Venue	Season
197/3 (17.4 overs)	Canada	Dallas	2024
176/6 (20 overs)	South Africa	North Sound	2024
159/3 (20 overs)	Pakistan	Dallas	2024
132/8 (20 overs)	India	Wankhede	2026
128 (19.5 overs)	West Indies	Bridgetown	2024
Last updated: 7 February 2026

=== Batting statistics ===
Most runs

Runs	Player	Mat	Inn	HS	Avg	100s	50s	Period
219	Andries Gous	6	6	80*	43.80	—N/a	2	2024–2024
162	Aaron Jones	6	6	94*	40.50	—N/a	1	2024–2024
99	Nitish Kumar	6	5	30	24.75	—N/a	—N/a	2024–2024
74	Steven Taylor	6	6	24	12.33	—N/a	—N/a	2024–2024
69	Harmeet Singh	6	4	38	17.25	—N/a	—N/a	2024–2024
Last updated: 23 June 2024

Highest partnerships

Runs	Players	Opposition	Venue	Season
131 (3rd wicket)	Andries Gous (43) & Aaron Jones (76)	v Canada	Dallas	2024
91 (6th wicket)	Harmeet Singh (38) & Andries Gous (49)	v South Africa	North Sound	2024
68 (2nd wicket)	Monank Patel (31) & Andries Gous (35)	v Pakistan	Dallas	2024
48* (4th wicket)	Nitish Kumar (14*) & Aaron Jones (32*)	v Pakistan	Dallas	2024
48 (2nd wicket)	Nitish Kumar (20) & Andries Gous (27)	v West Indies	Bridgetown	2024
Last updated: 23 June 2024

=== Bowling statistics ===
Most wickets

Wickets	Player	Matches	Avg.	Econ.	BBI	4W	5W	Period
6	Saurabh Netravalkar	6	20.83	6.63	2/18	0	0	2024–2024
4	Harmeet Singh	6	34.75	8.68	2/24	0	0	2024–2024
3	Nosthush Kenjige	4	29.66	8.90	3/30	0	0	2024–2024
3	Ali Khan	6	60.33	9.36	1/21	0	0	2024–2024
1	Corey Anderson	6	69.00	8.62	1/29	0	0	2024–2024
1	Jessy Singh	4	121.00	10.08	1/37	0	0	2024–2024
Last updated: 23 June 2024
