= 2026 Nepal Tri-Nation Series (May) =

Eighteenth tri-nation series round in 2024-26 CWCL2

- Part of 2024–2026 Cricket World Cup League 2
- Round 18
- Date: 12 – 22 May 2026
- Location: Nepal
Teams
Nepal	Scotland	United States
Captains
Rohit Paudel	Richie Berrington	Monank Patel, Saiteja Mukkamalla (Note: Saiteja Mukkamalla captained United States in their second, third and fourth matches of the series.)
Most runs
Kushal Bhurtel (177)	Brandon McMullen (167)	Smit Patel (192)
Most wickets
Sandeep Lamichhane (11)	Brad Currie (5); Mark Watt (5)	Shubham Ranjane (6)

The 2026 Nepal Tri-Nation Series in May was the eighteenth round of the 2024–2026 Cricket World Cup League 2 cricket tournament, which took place in Nepal from 12 to 22 May 2026. It was a tri-nation series contested by the men's national teams of Nepal, Scotland and the United States. The matches were played as One Day International (ODI) fixtures. The Cricket Association of Nepal announced the fixtures on 7 April 2026. All matches were played at the Tribhuvan University International Cricket Ground, Kirtipur.

== Squads ==
Nepal	Scotland	United States
Rohit Paudel (c); Dipendra Singh Airee (vc); Binod Bhandari (wk); Kushal Bhurtel; Gulshan Jha; Sompal Kami; Karan KC; Arjun Kumal; Sandeep Lamichhane; Ishan Pandey; Lalit Rajbanshi; Bhim Sharki; Aarif Sheikh; Aasif Sheikh (wk); Nandan Yadav	Richie Berrington (c); Matthew Cross (wk); Brad Currie; Jasper Davidson; Oliver Davidson; Michael English; Owen Gould (wk); Jack Jarvis; Ollie Jones; Michael Leask; Finlay McCreath; Brandon McMullen; George Munsey; Safyaan Sharif; Mark Watt	Monank Patel (c, wk) (Note: Monank Patel was the captain for the first ODI while Saiteja Mukkamalla was the captain for the rest of the series.); Saiteja Mukkamalla (c); Ritvik Appidi; Shayan Jahangir (wk); Shehan Jayasuriya; Nosthush Kenjige; Sanjay Krishnamurthi; Milind Kumar; Mohammad Mohsin; Saurabh Netravalkar; Smit Patel (wk); Shubham Ranjane; Harmeet Singh; Jessy Singh; Rushil Ugarkar

== Warm-up matches ==
Scotland and the United States each played two warm-up matches against Nepal A before the League 2 fixtures at Mulpani International Cricket Ground. The warm-up fixtures were originally scheduled to begin on 6 May 2026, but were rescheduled to 7 May due to weather constraints.

Warm-up matches

Warm-up match 1
7 May 2026
09:00
Scorecard

Nepal A 277/8 (50 overs)	v	Scotland; 232 (48.2 overs)
Dev Khanal 63 (65); Safyaan Sharif 2/29 (6 overs)		Finlay McCreath 52 (73); Rashid Khan 3/23 (3.2 overs)

Nepal A won by 45 runs
Mulpani International Cricket Ground, Kageshwari-Manohara
Umpires: Hem Raj Bhatta (Nep) and Himal Giri (Nep)
Player of the match: Dev Khanal (Nepal A)

- Nepal A won the toss and elected to bat.

Warm-up match 2
8 May 2026
09:00
Scorecard

United States; 262/8 (50 overs)	v	Nepal A 263/7 (49.1 overs)
Smit Patel 116 (108); Pawan Sarraf 2/44 (8 overs)		Mayan Yadav 72 (80); Milind Kumar 2/39 (8.1 overs)

Nepal A won by 3 wickets
Mulpani International Cricket Ground, Kageshwari-Manohara
Umpires: Ram Kailash Yadav (Nep) and Ujjwal Regmi (Nep)
Player of the match: Mayan Yadav (Nepal A)

- United States won the toss and elected to bat.

Warm-up match 3
9 May 2026
09:00
Scorecard

Scotland; 302/8 (50 overs)	v	Nepal A 204/4 (34.5 overs)
George Munsey 62 (51); Aakash Chand 3/59 (9 overs)		Sundeep Jora 83 (94); Bradley Currie 1/21 (4 overs)

Nepal A won by 9 runs (DLS method)
Mulpani International Cricket Ground, Kageshwari-Manohara
Umpires: Hem Raj Bhatta (Nep) and Ujjwal Regmi (Nep)
Player of the match: Sundeep Jora (Nepal A)

- Scotland won the toss and elected to bat.
- No further play was possible due to rain.

Warm-up match 4
11 May 2026
09:00
Scorecard

Nepal A 264 (49.5 overs)	v	United States; 257 (49.1 overs)
Sundeep Jora 111 (115); Saurabh Netravalkar 3/21 (8 overs)		Shehan Jayasuriya 71 (67); Sher Malla 4/30 (7.1 overs)

Nepal A won by 7 runs
Mulpani International Cricket Ground, Kageshwari-Manohara
Umpires: Himal Giri (Nep) and Ram Kailash Yadav (Nep)
Player of the match: Sundeep Jora (Nepal A)

- Nepal A won the toss and elected to bat.

== League 2 series ==
=== 1st ODI ===
12 May 2026
09:30
Scorecard

Scotland; 243/8 (50 overs)	v	Nepal; 218/7 (39 overs)
George Munsey 75 (62); Sandeep Lamichhane 4/41 (10 overs)		Gulshan Jha 61* (35); Brad Currie 3/43 (8 overs)

Scotland won by 2 runs (DLS method)
Tribhuvan University International Cricket Ground, Kirtipur
Umpires: Buddhi Pradhan (Nep) and Faisal Afridi (Pak)
Player of the match: Brad Currie (Sco)

- Scotland won the toss and elected to bat.
- Nepal were set a revised target of 221 runs from 39 overs due to rain.

=== 2nd ODI ===
14 May 2026
09:30
Scorecard

Scotland; 321/6 (47 overs)	v	United States; 246/8 (32 overs)
Finlay McCreath 77 (102); Saurabh Netravalkar 2/44 (9 overs)		Saiteja Mukkamalla 104 (75); Brandon McMullen 2/40 (6 overs)

Scotland won by 2 runs (DLS method)
Tribhuvan University International Cricket Ground, Kirtipur
Umpires: Buddhi Pradhan (Nep) and Durga Subedi (Nep)
Player of the match: Brandon McMullen (Sco)

- United States won the toss and elected to field.
- United States were set a revised target of 249 runs from 32 overs due to rain.
- Mohammad Mohsin (USA) made his ODI debut.

=== 3rd ODI ===
16 May 2026
09:30
Scorecard

United States; 195 (43.3 overs)	v	Nepal; 199/1 (36.4 overs)
Smit Patel 83 (89); Dipendra Singh Airee 4/24 (7.3 overs)		Kushal Bhurtel 120* (118); Mohammad Mohsin 1/41 (7 overs)

Nepal won by 9 wickets
Tribhuvan University International Cricket Ground, Kirtipur
Umpires: Durga Subedi (Nep) and Faisal Afridi (Pak)
Player of the match: Kushal Bhurtel (Nep)

- United States won the toss and elected to bat.
- Ishan Pandey (Nep) made his ODI debut.
- Saiteja Mukkamalla captained United States in ODIs for the first time.

=== 4th ODI ===
18 May 2026
09:30
Scorecard

Scotland; 194 (39.1 overs)	v	Nepal; 199/4 (38.1 overs)
Brandon McMullen 73 (44); Lalit Rajbanshi 4/32 (8 overs)		Rohit Paudel 74* (98); Mark Watt 2/58 (10 overs)

Nepal won by 6 wickets
Tribhuvan University International Cricket Ground, Kirtipur
Umpires: Faisal Afridi (Pak) and Buddhi Pradhan (Nep)
Player of the match: Lalit Rajbanshi (Nep)

- Scotland won the toss and elected to bat.
- Ollie Jones (Sco) made his ODI debut.
- Sandeep Lamichhane (Nep) became the fastest bowler to take 150 wickets in men's ODIs, in terms of matches played (73) and deliveries bowled (3,973).

=== 5th ODI ===
20 May 2026
09:30
Scorecard

Scotland; 169 (43.3 overs)	v	United States; 170/4 (27.1 overs)
Mark Watt 66 (85); Rushil Ugarkar 4/48 (8.3 overs)		Shayan Jahangir 37 (34); Jack Jarvis 1/17 (2 overs)

United States won by 6 wickets
Tribhuvan University International Cricket Ground, Kirtipur
Umpires: Buddhi Pradhan (Nep) and Durga Subedi (Nep)
Player of the match: Saurabh Netravalkar (USA)

- Scotland won the toss and elected to bat.

=== 6th ODI ===
22 May 2026
09:30
Scorecard

Nepal; 317/8 (50 overs)	v	United States; 195 (41.2 overs)
Ishan Pandey 84 (83); Shubham Ranjane 3/61 (10 overs)		Sanjay Krishnamurthi 56 (44); Sandeep Lamichhane 3/30 (10 overs)

Nepal won by 122 runs
Tribhuvan University International Cricket Ground, Kirtipur
Umpires: Durga Subedi (Nep) and Faisal Afridi (Pak)
Player of the match: Ishan Pandey (Nep)

- United States won the toss and elected to field.
