= 2026 Canada Tri-Nation Series =

Nineteenth tri-nation series round in 2024-26 CWCL2

- Part of 2024–2026 Cricket World Cup League 2
- Round 19
- Date: 6 – 16 June 2026
- Location: Canada
Teams
Canada	Netherlands	United States
Captains
Saad Bin Zafar	Scott Edwards	Monank Patel
Most runs
Yuvraj Samra (108)	Cedric de Lange (76)	Shehan Jayasuriya (155)
Most wickets
Zahid Shirzad (6)	Aryan Dutt (6)	Harmeet Singh (7)

The 2026 Canada Tri-Nation Series was the nineteenth round of the 2024–2026 Cricket World Cup League 2 cricket tournament, which took place in Canada from 6 to 16 June 2026. It was a tri-nation series contested by the men's national teams of Canada, Netherlands and the United States. The matches were played as One Day International (ODI) fixtures.

== Squads ==
Canada	Netherlands	United States
Saad Bin Zafar (c); Harsh Thaker (vc); Anoop Chima (wk); Aaron Johnson; Nicholas Kirton; Akhil Kumar; Shreyas Movva (wk); Ali Nadeem (wk); Yuvraj Samra; Kaleem Sana; Shivam Sharma; Zahid Shirzad; Pargat Singh; Sukhjinder Singh; Matthew Spoors	Scott Edwards (c, wk); Sebastiaan Braat; Noah Croes (wk); Cedric de Lange; Bas de Leede; Daniel Doram; Aryan Dutt; Olivier Elenbaas; Kyle Klein; Michael Levitt; Zach Lion-Cachet; Max O'Dowd; Alex Roy; Vikramjit Singh; Logan van Beek; Roelof van der Merwe	Monank Patel (c, wk); Ehsan Adil; Ritvik Appidi; Shayan Jahangir (wk); Shehan Jayasuriya; Nosthush Kenjige; Sanjay Krishnamurthi; Milind Kumar; Yasir Mohammad; Saiteja Mukkamalla; Saurabh Netravalkar; Smit Patel (wk); Shubham Ranjane; Harmeet Singh; Rushil Ugarkar

== Fixtures ==
=== 1st ODI ===
6 June 2026
11:00
Scorecard

Canada; 231/8 (45 overs)	v	United States; 235/2 (39.5 overs)
Ali Nadeem 51 (70); Ehsan Adil 3/27 (9 overs)		Shehan Jayasuriya 113* (111); Zahid Shirzad 2/59 (9 overs)

United States won by 8 wickets
Maple Leaf Cricket Club, King City
Umpires: Roland Black (Ire) and Arnold Maddela (Can)
Player of the match: Shehan Jayasuriya (USA)

- United States won the toss and elected to field.
- The match was reduced to 45 overs per side due to rain.
- Zahid Shirzad, Sukhjinder Singh (Can) and Ritvik Appidi (USA) all made their ODI debuts.
- Shehan Jayasuriya (USA) scored his first century in ODIs.

=== 2nd ODI ===
8 June 2026
11:00
Scorecard

Netherlands; 196/8 (50 overs)	v	United States; 175 (47.5 overs)
Max O'Dowd 59 (111); Harmeet Singh 4/26 (10 overs)		Shehan Jayasuriya 34 (63); Aryan Dutt 3/23 (10 overs)

Netherlands won by 21 runs
Maple Leaf Cricket Club, King City
Umpires: Harry Grewal (Can) and Arnold Maddela (Can)
Player of the match: Max O'Dowd (Ned)

- United States won the toss and elected to field.
- Cedric de Lange, Daniel Doram and Alex Roy (Ned) all made their ODI debuts.

=== 3rd ODI ===
10 June 2026
11:00
Scorecard

Netherlands; 214 (48 overs)	v	Canada; 218/8 (49.5 overs)
Scott Edwards 58 (76); Matthew Spoors 3/42 (8 overs)		Shreyas Movva 83* (108); Aryan Dutt 3/41 (10 overs)

Canada won by 2 wickets
Maple Leaf Cricket Club, King City
Umpires: Roland Black (Ire) and Arnold Maddela (Can)
Player of the match: Shreyas Movva (Can)

- Canada won the toss and elected to field.

=== 4th ODI ===
12 June 2026
11:00
Scorecard

Canada; 275/8 (50 overs)	v	United States; 276/5 (50 overs)
Nicholas Kirton 53 (68); Harmeet Singh 2/47 (10 overs)		Milind Kumar 111* (125); Kaleem Sana 2/57 (10 overs); Zahid Shirzad 2/57 (10 overs)

United States won by 5 wickets
Maple Leaf Cricket Club, King City
Umpires: Roland Black (Ire) and Arnold Maddela (Can)
Player of the match: Milind Kumar (USA)

- United States won the toss and elected to field.

=== 5th ODI ===
14 June 2026
11:00
Scorecard

Netherlands	v	United States

Match abandoned
Maple Leaf Cricket Club, King City
Umpires: Harry Grewal (Can) and Arnold Maddela (Can)

- No toss.
- No play was possible due to rain.

=== 6th ODI ===
16 June 2026
11:00
Scorecard

Netherlands; 15/1 (4.1 overs)	v	Canada
Cedric de Lange 10* (10); Akhil Kumar 1/6 (2 overs)

No result
Maple Leaf Cricket Club, King City
Umpires: Roland Black (Ire) and Harry Grewal (Can)

- Netherlands won the toss and elected to bat.
- No further play was possible due to a dangerous pitch.
