= 2025 United Arab Emirates Tri-Nation Series (League 2) =

Fifteenth tri-nation series round in 2024-26 CWCL2

- Part of 2024–2026 Cricket World Cup League 2
- Round 15
- Date: 26 October – 5 November 2025
- Location: United Arab Emirates
Teams
Nepal	United Arab Emirates	United States
Captains
Rohit Paudel	Rahul Chopra (Note: Alishan Sharafu captained United Arab Emirates in their last two matches of the series.)	Monank Patel
Most runs
Dipendra Singh Airee (175)	Muhammad Shahdad (131); Muhammad Waseem (131)	Milind Kumar (334)
Most wickets
Sandeep Lamichhane (8)	Junaid Siddique (10)	Harmeet Singh (9)

The 2025 United Arab Emirates Tri-Nation Series was the fifteenth round of the 2024–2026 Cricket World Cup League 2 cricket tournament which took place in the United Arab Emirates from 26 October to 5 November 2025. It was a tri-nation series contested by the men's national teams of the United Arab Emirates, Nepal and United States. The matches were played as One Day International (ODI) fixtures.

== Squads ==
Nepal	United Arab Emirates	United States
Rohit Paudel (c); Dipendra Singh Airee (vc); Shahab Alam; Kushal Bhurtel; Gulshan Jha; Sompal Kami; Karan KC; Sandeep Lamichhane; Kushal Malla; Lalit Rajbanshi; Anil Sah (wk); Bhim Sharki; Aarif Sheikh; Aasif Sheikh (wk); Nandan Yadav	Rahul Chopra (c, wk); Haider Ali; Zahid Ali; Muhammad Arfan; Harshit Kaushik; Sohaib Khan; Mayank Kumar; Dhruv Parashar; Muhammad Jawadullah; Muhammmad Rohid; Muhammad Shahdad; Alishan Sharafu; Aryansh Sharma (wk); Junaid Siddique; Simranjeet Singh; Muhammad Waseem	Monank Patel (c, wk); Jessy Singh (vc); Juanoy Drysdale; Andries Gous (wk); Shayan Jahangir (wk); Nosthush Kenjige; Sanjay Krishnamurthi; Milind Kumar; Yasir Mohammad; Saiteja Mukkamalla; Saurabh Netravalkar; Smit Patel (wk); Shubham Ranjane; Harmeet Singh; Rushil Ugarkar

== Fixtures ==
=== 1st ODI ===
26 October 2025
09:30
Scorecard

United States; 262/6 (50 overs)	v	Nepal; 156 (39.1 overs)
Smit Patel 75 (100); Sandeep Lamichhane 2/56 (10 overs)		Dipendra Singh Airee 40 (60); Harmeet Singh 6/27 (8.1 overs)

United States won by 106 runs
Dubai International Cricket Stadium, Dubai
Umpires: Akbar Ali (UAE) and Shiju Sam (UAE)
Player of the match: Harmeet Singh (USA)

- Nepal won the toss and elected to field.
- Shubham Ranjane and Rushil Ugarkar (USA) both made their ODI debuts.
- Harmeet Singh (USA) took his first five-wicket haul in ODIs.

=== 2nd ODI ===
28 October 2025
09:30
Scorecard

United Arab Emirates; 211/9 (50 overs)	v	United States; 213/6 (49.1 overs)
Harshit Kaushik 53 (54); Saurabh Netravalkar 3/28 (10 overs)		Milind Kumar 71 (81); Junaid Siddique 3/44 (10 overs)

United States won by 4 wickets
Dubai International Cricket Stadium, Dubai
Umpires: Aasif Iqbal (UAE) and Rohan Pandit (Ind)
Player of the match: Shubham Ranjane (USA)

- United States won the toss and elected to field.
- Haider Ali, Harshit Kaushik, Sohaib Khan, Muhammmad Rohid and Muhammad Shahdad (UAE) all made their ODI debuts.

=== 3rd ODI ===
30 October 2025
09:30
Scorecard

Nepal; 233 (50 overs)	v	United Arab Emirates; 237/5 (43.3 overs)
Rohit Paudel 109 (130); Zahid Ali 4/41 (6 overs)		Aryansh Sharma 98 (98); Sandeep Lamichhane 2/34 (10 overs)

United Arab Emirates won by 5 wickets
ICC Academy Ground, Dubai
Umpires: Akbar Ali (UAE) and Rohan Pandit (Ind)
Player of the match: Aryansh Sharma (UAE)

- Nepal won the toss and elected to bat.
- Zahid Ali (UAE) made his ODI debut.

=== 4th ODI ===
1 November 2025
09:30
Scorecard

Nepal; 271 (49.5 overs)	v	United States; 273/6 (49 overs)
Dipendra Singh Airee 75 (67); Harmeet Singh 3/33 (10 overs)		Saiteja Mukkamalla 75 (101); Sandeep Lamichhane 3/53 (10 overs)

United States won by 4 wickets
ICC Academy Ground, Dubai
Umpires: Aasif Iqbal (UAE) and Shiju Sam (UAE)
Player of the match: Milind Kumar (USA)

- United States won the toss and elected to field.

=== 5th ODI ===
3 November 2025
09:30
Scorecard

United States; 292/3 (50 overs)	v	United Arab Emirates; 49 (22.1 overs)
Saiteja Mukkamalla 137* (149); Junaid Siddique 2/60 (10 overs)		Junaid Siddique 10 (9); Rushil Ugarkar 5/22 (8.1 overs)

United States won by 243 runs
Dubai International Cricket Stadium, Dubai
Umpires: Akbar Ali (UAE) and Rohan Pandit (Ind)
Player of the match: Saiteja Mukkamalla (USA)

- United Arab Emirates won the toss and elected to field.
- Milind Kumar (USA) scored his 1,000th run in ODIs.
- Rushil Ugarkar (USA) took his first five-wicket haul in ODIs.

=== 6th ODI ===
5 November 2025
09:30
Scorecard

Nepal; 239/9 (50 overs)	v	United Arab Emirates; 243/6 (49.1 overs)
Bhim Sharki 48 (68); Dhruv Parashar 2/28 (10 overs)		Muhammad Shahdad 96 (123); Karan KC 3/58 (10 overs)

United Arab Emirates won by 4 wickets
ICC Academy Ground, Dubai
Umpires: Rohan Pandit (Ind) and Shiju Sam (UAE)
Player of the match: Muhammad Shahdad (UAE)

- United Arab Emirates won the toss and elected to field.
