= 2024 United States Tri-Nation Series =

Seventh tri-nation series round in 2024-26 WCL2

The 2024 United States Tri-Nation Series was the seventh round of the 2024–2026 Cricket World Cup League 2 cricket tournament that was held in the United States in October and November 2024. The tri-nation series was contested by the men's national teams of Nepal, Scotland and United States. The matches were played as One Day International (ODI) fixtures.

Before the start of the League 2 series, United States and Nepal played a three-match Twenty20 International (T20I) series at the Grand Prairie Stadium in Grand Prairie, Dallas. Nepal won the series 3–0.

== United States v Nepal T20I series ==
Nepalese cricket team in United States in 2024–25
	United States	Nepal
- Dates: 17 – 21 October 2024
Captains	Monank Patel	Rohit Paudel

Twenty20 International series
- Results: Nepal won the 3-match series 3–0
Most runs	Saiteja Mukkamalla (117)	Kushal Bhurtel (142)
Most wickets	Jessy Singh (5)	Sompal Kami (5)
- Player of the series: Sompal Kami (Nep)

=== Squads ===
United States	Nepal
Monank Patel (c, wk); Juanoy Drysdale; Andries Gous (wk); Shayan Jahangir (wk); Aaron Jones; Nosthush Kenjige; Ali Khan; Milind Kumar; Yasir Mohammad; Saiteja Mukkamalla; Saurabh Netravalkar; Abhishek Paradkar; Harmeet Singh; Jessy Singh; Utkarsh Srivastava	Rohit Paudel (c); Dipendra Singh Airee; Kushal Bhurtel; Rijan Dhakal; Sagar Dhakal; Gulsan Jha; Sompal Kami; Karan KC; Dev Khanal; Kushal Malla; Lalit Rajbanshi; Anil Sah (wk); Arjun Saud (wk); Bhim Sharki; Aarif Sheikh; Aasif Sheikh (wk)

=== Fixtures ===
==== 1st T20I ====
17 October 2024
19:00 (N)
Scorecard

Nepal; 164/9 (20 overs)	v	United States; 147/7 (20 overs)
Rohit Paudel 49 (33); Harmeet Singh 2/18 (4 overs)		Shayan Jahangir 60* (34); Dipendra Singh Airee 3/27 (3 overs)

Nepal won by 17 runs
Grand Prairie Stadium, Dallas
Umpires: Aditya Gajjar (USA) and Vijaya Mallela (USA)
Player of the match: Dipendra Singh Airee (Nep)

- United States won the toss and elected to field.

==== 2nd T20I ====
19 October 2024
19:00 (N)
Scorecard

Nepal; 170/6 (20 overs)	v	United States; 170/8 (20 overs)
Kushal Bhurtel 92* (54); Nosthush Kenjige 2/21 (3 overs)		Andries Gous 62 (43); Karan KC 3/35 (4 overs)

Match tied (Nepal won the Super Over)
Grand Prairie Stadium, Dallas
Umpires: Sameer Bandekar (USA) and Aditya Gajjar (USA)
Player of the match: Kushal Bhurtel (Nep)

- Nepal won the toss and elected to bat.
- Super Over: USA 2/2, Nepal 3/0

==== 3rd T20I ====
20 October 2024
19:00 (N)
Scorecard

United States; 156/5 (20 overs)	v	Nepal; 157/2 (18.4 overs)
Saiteja Mukkamalla 68 (51); Sompal Kami 3/27 (4 overs)		Aasif Sheikh 50 (39); Jessy Singh 1/24 (3 overs)

Nepal won by 8 wickets
Grand Prairie Stadium, Dallas
Umpires: Sameer Bandekar (USA) and Vijaya Mallela (USA)
Player of the match: Aasif Sheikh (Nep)

- United States won the toss and elected to bat.

== Tour matches ==
22 October 2024
10:30
Scorecard

Nepal; 81 (25.2 overs)	v	United States A 85/6 (23.1 overs)
Kushal Malla 18 (48); Aarin Nadkarni 4/14 (5 overs)		Nitish Reddy 29 (39); Sandeep Lamichhane 4/27 (8.1 overs)

United States A won by 4 wickets
Grand Prairie Stadium, Dallas
Umpires: Sameer Bandekar (USA) and Aditya Gajjar (USA)

- United States A won the toss and elected to field.

23 October 2024
10:30
Scorecard

Scotland; 340/7 (50 overs)	v	United States A 345/3 (48.3 overs)
Andrew Umeed 101 (88); Ali Sheikh 1/30 (7 overs)		Sanjay Krishnamurthi 167* (120); Brandon McMullen 1/45 (8 overs)

United States A won by 7 wickets
Grand Prairie Stadium, Dallas
Umpires: Sameer Bandekar (USA) and Aditya Gajjar (USA)
Player of the match: Sanjay Krishnamurthi (USA)

- United States A won the toss and elected to field.

== League 2 series ==
2024 United States Tri-Nation Series
- Part of 2024–2026 Cricket World Cup League 2
- Date: 25 October – 4 November 2024
- Location: United States
Teams
Nepal	Scotland	United States
Captains
Rohit Paudel	Richie Berrington	Monank Patel
Most runs
Anil Sah (131)	Brandon McMullen (167)	Monank Patel (181)
Most wickets
Sompal Kami (6)	Brad Currie (8)	Saurabh Netravalkar (8)

=== Squads ===
Nepal	Scotland	United States
Rohit Paudel (c); Dipendra Singh Airee; Kushal Bhurtel; Rijan Dhakal; Sagar Dhakal; Gulsan Jha; Sompal Kami; Karan KC; Dev Khanal; Sandeep Lamichhane; Kushal Malla; Lalit Rajbanshi; Anil Sah (wk); Arjun Saud (wk); ~~Bhim Sharki~~; Aarif Sheikh; Aasif Sheikh (wk)	Richie Berrington (c); Matthew Cross (wk); Brad Currie; Scott Currie; Oliver Davidson; Michael English; Jack Jarvis; Michael Jones; Michael Leask; Brandon McMullen; ~~George Munsey~~; Chris Sole; Charlie Tear (wk); Andrew Umeed; Mark Watt; Brad Wheal	Monank Patel (c, wk); Juanoy Drysdale; Andries Gous (wk); Shayan Jahangir (wk); Aaron Jones; Nosthush Kenjige; Sanjay Krishnamurthi; Milind Kumar; Yasir Mohammad; Saiteja Mukkamalla; Sushant Modani; Saurabh Netravalkar; ~~Smit Patel (wk)~~; Harmeet Singh; Jessy Singh; Utkarsh Srivastava; Shadley van Schalkwyk

On 18 October, Michael English was added to Scotland's squad after George Munsey was ruled out of the tri-nation series due to a groin injury. Sagar Dhakal and Dev Khanal were named as reserves in Nepal's squad. After the first match of the series, Smit Patel was ruled out of the United States squad and Sanjay Krishnamurthi was added as a replacement. Andries Gous was ruled out of United States' squad during the series due to an injury, and Aaron Jones was added to the squad as a replacement. Karan KC and Bhim Sharki were ruled out of Nepal's squad due to injuries before the final match of the series, and they were replaced by reserves Sagar Dhakal and Dev Khanal in the main squad.

=== Fixtures ===
==== 1st ODI ====
25 October 2024
10:30
Scorecard

United States; 144 (38.4 overs)	v	Scotland; 145/0 (24.5 overs)
Shadley van Schalkwyk 58 (87); Brad Currie 4/32 (10 overs)		Andrew Umeed 98* (79)

Scotland won by 10 wickets
Grand Prairie Stadium, Dallas
Umpires: Vijaya Mallela (USA) and Russell Warren (Eng)
Player of the match: Andrew Umeed (Sco)

- Scotland won the toss and elected to field.

==== 2nd ODI ====
27 October 2024
10:30
Scorecard

Nepal; 286 (50 overs)	v	United States; 291/7 (49.4 overs)
Rohit Paudel 96 (75); Nosthush Kenjige 4/52 (10 overs)		Shayan Jahangir 104 (97); Kushal Bhurtel 4/23 (6 overs)

United States won by 3 wickets
Grand Prairie Stadium, Dallas
Umpires: Jermaine Lindo (USA) and Russell Warren (Eng)
Player of the match: Shayan Jahangir (USA)

- United States won the toss and elected to field.

==== 3rd ODI ====
29 October 2024
10:30
Scorecard

Scotland; 154 (41.4 overs)	v	Nepal; 157/5 (29.5 overs)
Mark Watt 34 (40); Sandeep Lamichhane 3/45 (10 overs)		Aarif Sheikh 51* (42); Brandon McMullen 2/41 (7.5 overs)

Nepal won by 5 wickets
Grand Prairie Stadium, Dallas
Umpires: Jermaine Lindo (USA) and Vijaya Mallela (USA)
Player of the match: Aarif Sheikh (Nep)

- Nepal won the toss and elected to field.

==== 4th ODI ====
31 October 2024
10:30
Scorecard

Scotland; 317/5 (50 overs)	v	United States; 246 (44 overs)
Brandon McMullen 151 (140); Saurabh Netravalkar 2/69 (10 overs)		Utkarsh Srivastava 67 (63); Jack Jarvis 4/40 (7 overs)

Scotland won by 71 runs
Grand Prairie Stadium, Dallas
Umpires: Vijaya Mallela (USA) and Russell Warren (Eng)
Player of the match: Brandon McMullen (Sco)

- United States won the toss and elected to field.
- Utkarsh Srivastava (USA) made his ODI debut.

==== 5th ODI ====
2 November 2024
10:30
Scorecard

United States; 281/8 (50 overs)	v	Nepal; 244 (49.5 overs)
Saiteja Mukkamalla 75 (87); Gulsan Jha 3/87 (10 overs)		Anil Sah 52 (80); Saurabh Netravalkar 4/47 (9.5 overs)

United States won by 37 runs
Grand Prairie Stadium, Dallas
Umpires: Jermaine Lindo (USA) and Russell Warren (Eng)
Player of the match: Saurabh Netravalkar (USA)

- Nepal won the toss and elected to field.

==== 6th ODI ====
4 November 2024
10:30
Scorecard

Nepal; 26/1 (6 overs)	v	Scotland
Anil Sah 10 (19); Brad Currie 1/16 (3 overs)

No result
Grand Prairie Stadium, Dallas
Umpires: Jermaine Lindo (USA) and Vijaya Mallela (USA)

- Scotland won the toss and elected to field.
- No further play was possible due to rain.
