= Bangladeshi cricket team in the United States in 2024 =

International cricket tour

Bangladesh men's cricket team in the United States in 2024
	United States	Bangladesh
- Dates: 21 – 25 May 2024
Captains	Monank Patel (Note: Aaron Jones captained United States in the third T20I.)	Najmul Hossain Shanto

Twenty20 International series
- Results: United States won the 3-match series 2–1
Most runs	Corey Anderson (65)	Towhid Hridoy (83)
Most wickets	Ali Khan (4)	Mustafizur Rahman (10)
- Player of the series: Mustafizur Rahman (Ban)

The Bangladesh men's cricket team toured the United States in May 2024 to play three Twenty20 International (T20I) matches against the United States national cricket team. The series formed part of both teams' preparation ahead of the 2024 ICC Men's T20 World Cup. In March 2024, USA Cricket confirmed the fixtures for the tour.

This was the first bilateral series between the two teams. Bangladesh had last toured the United States in 2018, as part of a series against West Indies.

United States won the first match of the series by 5 wickets. This was their first match, and first victory, against Bangladesh. Bangladesh became the first team to suffer from 100 men's T20I defeats in the second match, as United States won the match by 6 runs and secured their first series victory against a full member team. United States eventually won the series 2–1 after Mustafizur Rahman's six-wicket haul helpied Bangladesh win the third match by 10 wickets. It was Bangladesh's first victory by 10 wickets in the format.

== Squads ==
United States	Bangladesh
Monank Patel (c, wk); Aaron Jones (vc); Corey Anderson; Andries Gous (wk); Shayan Jahangir (wk); Nosthush Kenjige; Ali Khan; Milind Kumar; Nitish Kumar; Saurabh Netravalkar; Nisarg Patel; Shadley van Schalkwyk; Harmeet Singh; Jessy Singh; Steven Taylor	Najmul Hossain Shanto (c); ~~Taskin Ahmed (vc)~~; Jaker Ali (wk); Liton Das (wk); Mahedi Hasan; Tanzid Hasan; Afif Hossain; Rishad Hossain; Towhid Hridoy; Tanvir Islam; Hasan Mahmud; Mahmudullah; Mustafizur Rahman; Tanzim Hasan Sakib; Soumya Sarkar; Shakib Al Hasan; Shoriful Islam

United States named Juanoy Drysdale, Yasir Mohammad and Gajanand Singh as reserves. Taskin Ahmed was ruled out of the Bangladesh squad for the series due to injury.

== T20I series ==
=== 1st T20I ===
21 May 2024
09:00
Scorecard

Bangladesh; 153/6 (20 overs)	v	United States; 156/5 (19.3 overs)
Towhid Hridoy 58 (47); Steven Taylor 2/9 (3 overs)		Corey Anderson 34* (25); Mustafizur Rahman 2/41 (4 overs)

United States won by 5 wickets
Prairie View Cricket Complex, Houston
Umpires: Sameer Bandekar (USA) and Jermaine Lindo (USA)
Player of the match: Harmeet Singh (USA)

- United States won the toss and elected to field.

=== 2nd T20I ===
23 May 2024
09:00
Scorecard

United States; 144/6 (20 overs)	v	Bangladesh; 138 (19.3 overs)
Monank Patel 42 (38); Rishad Hossain 2/21 (4 overs)		Najmul Hossain Shanto 36 (34); Ali Khan 3/25 (3.3 overs)

United States won by 6 runs
Prairie View Cricket Complex, Houston
Umpires: Aditya Gajjar (USA) and Vijaya Mallela (USA)
Player of the match: Ali Khan (USA)

- Bangladesh won the toss and elected to field.

=== 3rd T20I ===
25 May 2024
09:00
Scorecard

United States; 104/9 (20 overs)	v	Bangladesh; 108/0 (11.4 overs)
Andries Gous 27 (15); Mustafizur Rahman 6/10 (4 overs)		Tanzid Hasan 58* (42)

Bangladesh won by 10 wickets
Prairie View Cricket Complex, Houston
Umpires: Sameer Bandekar (USA) and Vijaya Mallela (USA)
Player of the match: Mustafizur Rahman (Ban)

- Bangladesh won the toss and elected to field.
- Shayan Jahangir (USA) made his T20I debut.
