= 2024–2026 Cricket World Cup League 2 =

Qualifying league for 2027 CWC qualification

2024–2026 ICC Men's Cricket World Cup League 2
- Dates: 15 February 2024 – 4 November 2026
- Administrator: International Cricket Council
- Cricket format: One Day International
- Tournament format: Round-robin
- Host: Various
- Champions: United States (1st title)
- Participants: 8
- Matches: 144
- Most runs: (United States) Milind Kumar (1380)
- Most wickets: (Oman) Shakeel Ahmed (59)

The 2024–2026 ICC Men's Cricket World Cup League 2 was the second edition of the Cricket World Cup League 2, a cricket tournament that formed part of the 2027 Cricket World Cup qualification process. As a result of the scrapping of Super League, this cycle of League 2 saw an increase from 7 to 8 teams. The rise in team count led to an increase in the total number of fixtures from 126 to 144. Scotland entered the competition as the defending champions from the previous edition.

== Teams and qualification ==
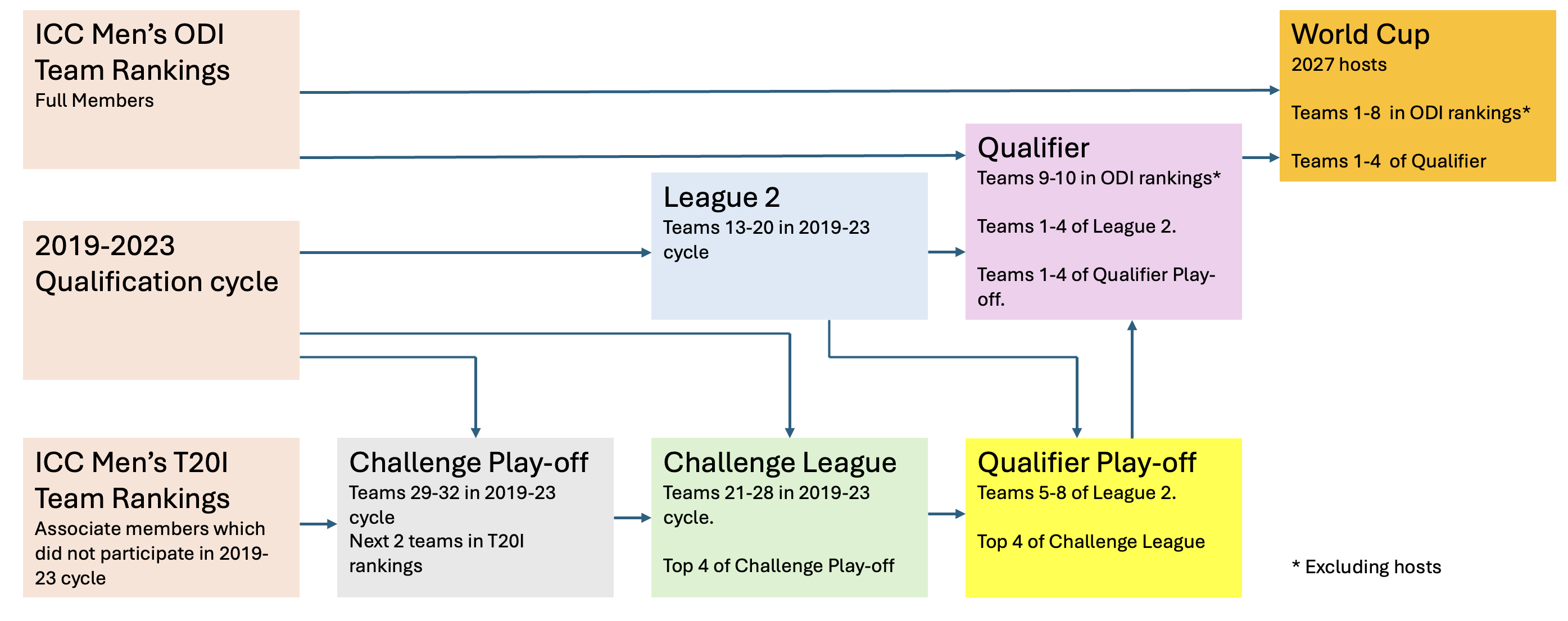
Qualification Pathway for the 2027 Cricket World Cup

The previous World Cup qualification cycle allowed for promotion of the League 2 champion to the Super League. However, the scrapping of that tournament meant that the previous League 2 champions, Scotland, remained in this competition, and Netherlands were added having previously played in the Super League. They were joined by the top 3 finishers from the previous League 2 and four teams from the 2023 Cricket World Cup Qualifier Play-off. The play-off resulted in Canada being promoted, with Papua New Guinea relegated to the Challenge League.

Method of qualification	Date of qualification	Venues	No. of teams	Qualified teams
2020–2023 Super League	30 July 2020 – 14 May 2023	Various	1	Netherlands
2019–2023 League 2	14 August 2019 – 16 March 2023	Various	3	Nepal
2019–2023 League 2	14 August 2019 – 16 March 2023	Various	3	Oman
2019–2023 League 2	14 August 2019 – 16 March 2023	Various	3	Scotland
2023 Qualifier Play-off	26 March – 5 April 2023	Namibia	4	Canada
2023 Qualifier Play-off	26 March – 5 April 2023	Namibia	4	Namibia
2023 Qualifier Play-off	26 March – 5 April 2023	Namibia	4	United Arab Emirates
2023 Qualifier Play-off	26 March – 5 April 2023	Namibia	4	United States
Total			8	

== Fixtures ==
The International Cricket Council announced the schedule of tri-series events in February 2024. Each team will play three home series and a further six series away from home (for a total of 36 matches). Teams will play a tri-series in all but one of the other competing nations.

The seventeenth round matches, scheduled for March 2026 in Kathmandu, involving Nepal, Oman and United Arab Emirates, were postponed to April–May 2026 due to the situation in the Middle East.

Round	Schedule	Host team	2nd team	3rd team	Notes
1	February 2024	Nepal	Namibia	Netherlands	
2	February–March 2024	United Arab Emirates	Canada	Scotland	The last match, scheduled to be played between UAE and Scotland, was postponed due to a storm that hit the area. The match was instead played in round 11.
3	July 2024	Scotland	Namibia	Oman	The series was postponed from May 2024 due to adverse weather causing a delay in pitch preparation.
4	August 2024	Netherlands	Canada	United States	
5	September 2024	Namibia	United Arab Emirates	United States	
6	September 2024	Canada	Nepal	Oman	
7	October–November 2024	United States	Scotland	Nepal	
8	November 2024	Oman	Netherlands	United Arab Emirates	
9	February 2025	Oman	Namibia	United States	
10	March 2025	Namibia	Canada	Netherlands	
11	May 2025	Netherlands	Scotland	United Arab Emirates	Included one match rescheduled from round 2.
12	May 2025	United States	Canada	Oman	
13	June 2025	Scotland	Nepal	Netherlands	
14	August–September 2025	Canada	Namibia	Scotland	
15	October–November 2025	United Arab Emirates	Nepal	United States	
16	April 2026	Namibia	Oman	Scotland	
17	April–May 2026	Nepal	Oman	United Arab Emirates	Originally scheduled for November 2025, it was rescheduled to March 2026 due to the 2025 Nepal Premier League, before being postponed again to April 2026 due to the conflict in the Middle East.
18	May 2026	Nepal	Scotland	United States	The series was brought forward from November 2026 to create a window for the 2026 Nepal Premier League.
19	June 2026	Canada	Netherlands	United States	
20	July 2026	Netherlands	Namibia	Nepal	The series was brought forward from August 2026 to create a window for the European T20 Premier League.
21	August 2026	Scotland	Canada	United Arab Emirates	
22	October 2026	United States	Namibia	United Arab Emirates	
23	October 2026	Oman	Canada	Nepal	
24	October–November 2026	United Arab Emirates	Netherlands	Oman	

== Results ==
=== Home and away matches ===
Home \ Away	(Canada)	(Namibia)	(Nepal)	(Netherlands)	(Oman)	(Scotland)	(United Arab Emirates)	(United States)
Canada		0–2 [2]	2–0 [2]	1–0 [2]	2–0 [2]	0–2 [2]		0–2 [2]
Namibia	1–1 [2]			0–2 [2]	1–1 [2]	0–1 [2]	1–1 [2]	0–2 [2]
Nepal		0–2 [2]		1–1 [2]	1–1 [2]	1–1 [2]	2–0 [2]	2–0 [2]
Netherlands	2–0 [2]	1–1 [2]	2–0 [2]			1–1 [2]	2–0 [2]	2–0 [2]
Oman	1–1 [2]	1–1 [2]	0–2 [2]	2–0 [2]			2–0 [2]	1–1 [2]
Scotland	2–0 [2]	2–0 [2]	1–1 [2]	1–1 [2]	1–0 [2]		1–0 [2]	
United Arab Emirates	0–2 [2]		2–0 [2]	1–1 [2]	2–0 [2	0–1 [1] (Note: One match between UAE and Scotland was postponed due to a storm and was later played at a neutral venue (the Netherlands).)		0–2 [2]
United States	2–0 [2]	1–1 [2]	2–0 [2]		1–1 [2]	0–2 [2]	2–0 [2]	

Source: Cricinfo
The numbers in square brackets are the numbers of matches played.
Legend: Blue = home team win; Yellow = draw; Red = away team win.

=== Neutral venue matches ===
Team 1 \ Team 2	(Canada)	(Namibia)	(Nepal)	(Netherlands)	(Oman)	(Scotland)	(United Arab Emirates)	(United States)
Canada			1–1 [2]	0–0 [2]	0–2 [2]	2–0 [2]	0–1 [2]	0–2 [2]
Namibia			2–0 [2]	1–1 [2]	1–1 [2]	0–1 [2]	1–0 [2]	0–2 [2]
Nepal				2–0 [2]	0–1 [2]	1–0 [2]		0–2 [2]
Netherlands					2–0 [2]		1–1 [2]	1–0 [2]
Oman						1–0 [2]	0–2 [2]	
Scotland							2–1 [3] (Note: One match between UAE and Scotland was postponed due to a storm and was later played at a neutral venue (the Netherlands).)	1–1 [2]
United Arab Emirates								0–2 [2]
United States								

Source: Cricinfo
The numbers in square brackets are the numbers of matches played.
Legend: Blue = left column team win; Yellow = draw; Red = top row team win.

== Points table ==
Pos	Team	Pld	W	L	NR	Pts	NRR	Qualification
1	United States	36	24	11	1	49	0.653	Advanced to the 2027 Cricket World Cup Qualifier
2	Scotland	36	19	10	7	45	0.710	Advanced to the 2027 Cricket World Cup Qualifier
3	Netherlands	36	20	12	4	44	0.315	Advanced to the 2027 Cricket World Cup Qualifier
4	Oman	36	15	18	3	33	−0.224	Advanced to the 2027 Cricket World Cup Qualifier
5	Namibia	36	15	18	3	33	−0.278	Advanced to the 2027 Cricket World Cup Qualifier Play-off
6	Nepal	36	14	20	2	30	0.000	Advanced to the 2027 Cricket World Cup Qualifier Play-off
7	Canada	36	12	19	5	29	−0.343	Advanced to the 2027 Cricket World Cup Qualifier Play-off
8	United Arab Emirates	36	11	22	3	25	−0.778	Advanced to the 2027 Cricket World Cup Qualifier Play-off

Source: Cricinfo
Rules for classification: 1) Points; 2) Wins; 3) Net run rate; 4) Head-to-head record

== Statistics ==
=== Most runs ===
Runs	Player	Inns.	HS	Ave	SR	100s	50s
1,380	(United States) Milind Kumar	31	155*	62.72	100.21	5	7
1,305	(Netherlands) Max O'Dowd	33	158*	42.09	80.20	3	7
1,224	(United States) Saiteja Mukkamalla	28	137*	51.00	84.23	3	8
1,184	(Scotland) George Munsey	25	191	49.33	103.85	2	8
1,124	(United States) Monank Patel	31	121*	37.46	86.13	2	9
Source: Cricinfo

=== Highest individual score ===
Runs	Batsman	Balls	4s	6s	Opposition	Ground	Match date
191	(Scotland) George Munsey	150	14	11	Netherlands	Dundee	12 June 2025
158*	(Netherlands) Max O'Dowd	130	13	4	Scotland	Dundee	12 June 2025
155*	(United States) Milind Kumar	110	16	5	United Arab Emirates	Windhoek	24 September 2024
152*	(United States) Smit Patel	137	12	4	Canada	Lauderhill	17 May 2025
151	(Scotland) Brandon McMullen	140	11	6	United States	Dallas	31 October 2024
Source:Cricinfo

=== Most wickets ===
Wkts.	Player	Inns.	Ov.	Runs	BBI	Ave	SR	Eco.	4WI	5WI
59	(Oman) Shakeel Ahmed	29	273.4	959	5/23	16.25	27.83	3.50	3	1
55	(Namibia) Bernard Scholtz	33	305.5	1,048	5/22	19.05	33.36	3.42	3	1
51	(Nepal) Sandeep Lamichhane	29	277.0	1,193	4/41	23.39	32.58	4.30	1	0
50	(Netherlands) Aryan Dutt	28	257.0	1,010	6/34	20.20	30.84	3.92	1	1
48	(United States) Saurabh Netravalkar	29	254.1	1,096	4/33	22.83	31.77	4.31	2	0
Source: Cricinfo

=== Best bowling figures in an innings ===
BBI	Bowler	Overs	Mdns	Econ	Opposition	Ground	Match date
7/21	(Scotland) Charlie Cassell	5.4	1	3.70	Oman	Dundee	22 July 2024
6/27	(United States) Harmeet Singh	8.1	1	3.30	Nepal	Dubai	26 October 2025
6/27	(Namibia) JJ Smit	9.5	1	2.74	Nepal	Utrecht	21 July 2026
6/34	(Netherlands) Aryan Dutt	9.0	0	3.77	Namibia	Kirtipur	19 February 2024
6/35	(United Arab Emirates) Ajay Kumar	9.5	1	3.55	Oman	Kirtipur	27 April 2026
Source:Cricinfo
