= Jariwala =

Jariwala is a surname. Notable people with this surname is:

- Darshan Jariwala (born 1958), Indian actor

- Apara Jariwala, Indian actress, wife of the above

- Harihar Jethalal Jariwala (1938–1985), Indian actor
- Rahul Jariwala, American cricketer
- Shefali Jariwala (1982–2025), Indian actress
