= 2026 Oman Tri-Nation Series =

23rd tri-nation series round in 2024-26 WCL2

- Part of 2024–2026 Cricket World Cup League 2
- Round 23
- Date: 9 – 19 October 2026
- Location: Oman
Teams
Canada	Nepal	Oman
Captains
Hamza Tariq	Sandeep Lamichhane	Vinayak Shukla
Most runs
Aaron Johnson (142)	Rohit Paudel (260)	Jatinder Singh (154)
Most wickets
Sheel Patel (7) Sukhjinder Singh (7)	Sandeep Lamichhane (9); Lalit Rajbanshi (9)	Hassnain Shah (8)

The 2026 Oman Tri-Nation Series was the 23rd round of the 2024–2026 Cricket World Cup League 2 cricket tournament that was played in Oman in October 2026. It was a tri-nation series contested by the men's national teams of Canada, Nepal and Oman. The matches were played with One Day International (ODI) status.

== Warm-up match ==
Before the start of the League 2 series, Nepal played a warm up match against Oman A.

Warm-up match
7 October 2026
11:00
Scorecard

Oman A 160 (39.5 overs)	v	Nepal; 240/8 (48.2 overs)
Hammad Mirza 54 (79); Nandan Yadav 3/17 (5 overs)		Ishan Pandey 72 (99); Samay Shrivastava 3/49 (10 overs)

Nepal won by 2 wickets (DLS)
Oman Cricket Academy Ground Turf 2, Al Amarat
Umpires: Gopakumar Pillai (Oma) and Sagir Vengitta (Oma)

- Oman A won the toss and elected to bat.
- Nepal were set a revised target of 240 runs from 50 overs due to rain.

== Squads ==
Canada	Nepal	Oman
Hamza Tariq (c); Shreyas Movva (vc); Dilraj Deol; Samit Gohel; Ajayveer Hundal; Aaron Johnson; Akhil Kumar; Sheel Patel; Yuvraaj Samra; Kaleem Sana; Shivam Sharma; Zahid Shirzad; Sukhjinder Singh; Harsh Thaker; Aaditya Varadarajan	Sandeep Lamichhane (c); Basir Ahamad; Dipendra Singh Airee; Shahab Alam; Gulshan Jha; Sundeep Jora; Karan KC; Dev Khanal; Arjun Kumal (wk); Sher Malla; Ishan Pandey; Rohit Paudel; Lalit Rajbanshi; Aasif Sheikh (wk); Nandan Yadav	Vinayak Shukla (c, wk); Shakeel Ahmed; Mujibur Ali; Shah Faisal; Zikria Islam; Abdul Khaliq; Nadeem Khan; Hammad Mirza; Jay Odedra; Sanju Sajeev; Hassnain Shah; Samay Shrivastava; Jatinder Singh; Karan Sonavale; Hasnain Ul Wahab

== Fixtures ==
=== 1st ODI ===
9 October 2026
11:00
Scorecard

Oman; 263 (49.1 overs)	v	Canada; 222 (48 overs)
Hasnain Ul Wahab 93 (77); Harsh Thaker 4/37 (7 overs)		Aaditya Varadarajan 64 (81); Hassnain Shah 4/33 (10 overs)

Oman won by 41 runs
Oman Cricket Academy Ground Turf 1, Al Amarat
Umpires: Masudur Rahman (Ban) and Raveendra Wimalasiri (Sri)
Player of the match: Hasnain Ul Wahab (Oma)

- Oman won the toss and elected to bat.
- Ajayveer Hundal, Sheel Patel (Can) and Zikria Islam (Oma) made their ODI debuts.

=== 2nd ODI ===
11 October 2026
11:00
Scorecard

Nepal; 235 (50 overs)	v	Canada; 211 (48.4 overs)
Rohit Paudel 101 (127); Akhil Kumar 4/68 (10 overs)		Aaron Johnson 44 (49); Sandeep Lamichhane 2/33 (10 overs)

Nepal won by 24 runs
Oman Cricket Academy Ground Turf 1, Al Amarat
Umpires: Vinod Babu (Oma) and Raveendra Wimalasiri (SL)
Player of the match: Rohit Paudel (Nep)

- Canada won the toss and elected to field.
- Samit Gohel (Can) made his ODI debut.

=== 3rd ODI ===
13 October 2026
11:00
Scorecard

Nepal; 263/8 (50 overs)	v	Oman; 150 (40 overs)
Rohit Paudel 61 (67); Karan Sonavale 2/38 (9 overs)		Vinayak Shukla 77 (83); Nandan Yadav 3/12 (6 overs)

Nepal won by 113 runs
Oman Cricket Academy Ground Turf 1, Al Amarat
Umpires: Masudur Rahman (Ban) and Raveendra Wimalasiri (SL)
Player of the match: Karan KC (Nep)

- Nepal won the toss and elected to bat.
- Rohit Paudel became the first Nepalese batter to score 2,500 run in ODIs.

=== 4th ODI ===
15 October 2026
11:00
Scorecard

Canada; 256 (50 overs)	v	Oman; 198 (46.3 overs)
Samit Gohel 67 (85); Hassnain Shah 3/47 (10 overs)		Hammad Mirza 49 (86); Sheel Patel 3/38 (9 overs)

Canada won by 58 runs
Oman Cricket Academy Ground Turf 1, Al Amarat
Umpires: Vinod Babu (Oma) and Masudur Rahman (Ban)
Player of the match: Sheel Patel (Can)

- Canada won the toss and elected to bat.

=== 5th ODI ===
17 October 2026
11:00
Scorecard

Canada; 256 (50 overs)	v	Nepal; 232 (46 overs)
Yuvraaj Samra 105 (117); Lalit Rajbanshi 4/39 (10 overs)		Arjun Kumal 87 (112); Sukhjinder Singh 3/38 (10 overs)

Canada won by 24 runs
Oman Cricket Academy Ground Turf 1, Al Amarat
Umpires: Vinod Babu (Oma) and Raveendra Wimalasiri (SL)
Player of the match: Yuvraaj Samra (Can)

- Canada won the toss and elected to bat.
- Yuvraaj Samra (Can) scored his first century in ODIs.

=== 6th ODI ===
19 October 2026
11:00
Scorecard

Nepal; 280 (50 overs)	v	Oman; 270/7 (50 overs)
Rohit Paudel 80 (81); Shah Faisal 5/57 (8 overs)		Jatinder Singh 89 (114); Lalit Rajbanshi 2/53 (8 overs)

Nepal won by 10 runs
Oman Cricket Academy Ground Turf 1, Al Amarat
Umpires: Vinod Babu (Oma) and Masudur Rahman (Ban)
Player of the match: Dipendra Singh Airee (Nep)

- Nepal won the toss and elected to bat.
- Shah Faisal (Oma) took his maiden five-wicket haul in ODIs.
