= 2026 United Arab Emirates Tri-Nation Series =

24th tri-nation series round in 2024-26 WCL2

- Part of 2024–2026 Cricket World Cup League 2
- Round 24
- Date: 25 October – 4 November 2026
- Location: United Arab Emirates
Teams
| Netherlands | Oman | United Arab Emirates |
Captains
| Bas de Leede | Vinayak Shukla | Rahul Chopra |
Most runs
| Max O'Dowd (301) | Jatinder Singh (188) | Akshdeep Nath (197) |
Most wickets
| Aryan Dutt (6) | Samay Shrivastava (6) | Awais Ali Shah (7) |

The 2026 United Arab Emirates Tri-Nation Series was the 24th and the final round of the 2024–2026 Cricket World Cup League 2 cricket tournament that taking place in United Arab Emirates from October to November 2026. It was a tri-nation series contested by the men's national teams of Netherlands, Oman and the United Arab Emirates. All the matches were played with One Day International (ODI) status.

== Squads ==
| Netherlands | Oman | United Arab Emirates |
|---|---|---|
| Bas de Leede (c); Colin Ackermann; Shariz Ahmad; Noah Croes (wk); Cedric de Lange; Daniel Doram; Aryan Dutt; Scott Edwards (wk); Fred Klaassen; Kyle Klein; Michael Levitt; Zach Lion-Cachet; Max O'Dowd; Timm van der Gugten; Paul van Meekeren | Vinayak Shukla (c, wk); Shakeel Ahmed; Mujibur Ali; Aryan Bisht; Shah Faisal; Muhammed Imran; Zikria Islam; Hammad Mirza; Saishiv Narayan; Jay Odedra; Hassnain Shah; Jeet Shah; Samay Shrivastava; Jatinder Singh; Hasnain Ul Wahab | Rahul Chopra (c); Muhammad Arfan; Basil Hameed; Aayan Afzal Khan; Sohaib Khan; Akshdeep Nath; Muhammad Rohid; Awais Ali Shah; Muhammad Shahdad; Aryansh Sharma (wk); Junaid Siddique; Tanish Suri (wk); Khuzaima Tanveer; Adeeb Usmani (wk); Muhammad Waseem |

== Fixtures ==
=== 1st ODI ===
25 October 2026
09:30
Scorecard

| United Arab Emirates; 244/8 (50 overs) | v | Netherlands; 245/7 (43.5 overs) |
| Rahul Chopra 82* (102); Timm van der Gugten 5/39 (10 overs) | | Max O'Dowd 103 (79); Khuzaima Tanveer 4/43 (9.5 overs) |

Netherlands won by 3 wickets
ICC Academy Ground, Dubai
Umpires: Akbar Ali (UAE) and Virender Sharma (Ind)
Player of the match: Max O'Dowd (Ned)

- United Arab Emirates won the toss and elected to bat.

=== 2nd ODI ===
27 October 2026
09:30
Scorecard

| Netherlands; 371/5 (50 overs) | v | Oman; 265 (49.3 overs) |
| Bas de Leede 145* (110); Aryan Bisht 2/32 (7 overs) | | Zikria Islam 77 (46); Zach Lion-Cachet 3/43 (8.3 overs) |

Netherlands won by 106 runs
ICC Academy Ground, Dubai
Umpires: Aasif Iqbal (UAE) and Shiju Sam (UAE)
Player of the match: Bas de Leede (Ned)

- Oman won the toss and elected to field.
- Cedric de Lange (Ned) scored his first century in ODIs.

=== 3rd ODI ===
29 October 2026
09:30
Scorecard

| Oman; 196 (45.1 overs) | v | United Arab Emirates; 199/6 (47.3 overs) |
| Jatinder Singh 88 (107); Awais Ali Shah 5/33 (10 overs) | | Aryansh Sharma 49 (61); Samay Shrivastava 3/27 (10 overs) |

United Arab Emirates won by 4 wickets
ICC Academy Ground, Dubai
Umpires: Akbar Ali (UAE) and Virender Sharma (Ind)
Player of the match: Awais Ali Shah (UAE)

- United Arab Emirates won the toss and elected to field.

=== 4th ODI ===
31 October 2026
09:30
Scorecard

| Netherlands; 263/4 (50 overs) | v | United Arab Emirates; 266/5 (49 overs) |
| Max O'Dowd 106 (119); Aayan Afzal Khan 3/48 (10 overs) | | Akshdeep Nath 99 (88); Bas de Leede 2/44 (9 overs) |

United Arab Emirates won by 5 wickets
ICC Academy Ground, Dubai
Umpires: Shiju Sam (UAE) and Virender Sharma (Ind)
Player of the match: Akshdeep Nath (UAE)

- Netherlands won the toss and elected to bat.

=== 5th ODI ===
2 November 2026
09:30
Scorecard

| Oman; 182 (49.2 overs) | v | Netherlands; 183/3 (36 overs) |
| Mujibur Ali 44 (78); Colin Ackermann 4/23 (10 overs) | | Cedric de Lange 79 (107); Nadeem Khan 1/38 (9 overs) |

Netherlands won by 7 wickets
ICC Academy Ground, Dubai
Umpires: Akbar Ali (UAE) and Aasif Iqbal (UAE)
Player of the match: Colin Ackermann (Ned)

- Netherlands won the toss and elected to field.

=== 6th ODI ===
4 November 2026
09:30
Scorecard

| United Arab Emirates; 226/8 (50 overs) | v | Oman; 184/9 (50 overs) |
| Adeeb Usmani 47 (53); Shakeel Ahmed 3/42 (10 overs) | | Mujibur Ali 65 (84); Muhammad Rohid 2/21 (7 overs); Khuzaima Tanveer 2/21 (7 overs) |

United Arab Emitates won by 42 runs
ICC Academy Ground, Dubai
Umpires: Akbar Ali (UAE) and Virender Sharma (Ind)
Player of the match: Basil Hameed (UAE)

- Oman won the toss and elected to field.
