= Rahul Jariwala =

American cricketer (born 2004)

Personal information
- Full name: Rahul Mihir Jariwala
- Born: 3 June 2004 (age 22); Fremont, California, California, United States
- Batting: Right-handed
- Role: Wicket-keeper

International information
- National side: United States
- ODI debut (cap 39): June 4, 2022 v UAE
- Last ODI: September 17, 2022 v Namibia
- Only T20I (cap 49): April 20, 2025 v Bahamas

Career statistics
Competition	ODI	T20I
Matches	4	1
Runs scored	30	35
Batting average	7.50	35.00
100s/50s	0/0	0/0
Top score	14	35
Catches/stumpings	0/–	0/0
- Source: Cricinfo, 15 February 2026

Rahul Mihir Jariwala (born 3 June 2004) is an American cricketer who plays as a wicket-keeper for the United States cricket team.

Jariwala was born in Fremont, California and was 15 years old when he first played for the United States under-19 cricket team. In 2019, Jariwala played for the under-19 team in the qualification matches for the 2020 Under-19 Cricket World Cup.

Following his performances in the Minor League Cricket, and being named the USA Junior Cricketer of the Year, Jariwala earned his maiden call-up to the national team. In May 2022, he was named in the USA's One Day International (ODI) squads for round 12 and round 13 of the 2019–2023 ICC Cricket World Cup League 2 tournament. He made his ODI debut on 4 June 2022, against the United Arab Emirates.
