= Rahul Bhatia =

Emirati cricketer (born 1998)

Personal information
- Full name: Rahul Neelesh Bhatia
- Born: 24 November 1998 (age 27); Dubai, United Arab Emirates
- Batting: Left-handed
- Bowling: Slow left-arm orthodox
- Role: Batsman

International information
- National side: United Arab Emirates
- ODI debut (cap 92): 1 June 2022 v United States
- Last ODI: 25 February 2023 v Namibia
- Source: Cricinfo, 2 June 2022

Rahul Bhatia (born 24 November 1998) is a cricketer who plays for the United Arab Emirates national cricket team. In May 2022, he was named in United Arab Emirates' One Day International (ODI) squad for the 2022 United States Tri-Nation Series. He made his ODI debut on 1 June 2022, against the United States. He had previously played for the United Arab Emirates XI team, also against the United States, during the USA's tour of the UAE in March 2019.
