= Ehsan Adil =

Pakistani-born cricketer (born 1993)

Personal information
- Born: 15 March 1993 (age 33); Gojra, Punjab, Pakistan
- Height: 6 ft 4 in (193 cm)
- Bowling: Right-arm fast-medium
- Role: Bowler

International information
- National sides: Pakistan (2013–2015); United States (2026–)
- Test debut (cap 213): 22 February 2013; Pakistan v South Africa
- Last Test: 7 July 2015; Pakistan v Sri Lanka
- ODI debut (cap 190): 17 May 2013; Pakistan v Scotland
- Last ODI: 20 March 2015; Pakistan v Australia
- Only T20I (cap 53): 10 February 2026; United States v Pakistan

Domestic team information
- Years: Team
- 2012–: HBL cricket team
- 2012–: Faisalabad Wolves
- 2016: Lahore Qalandars
- 2023-present: MI New York

Career statistics
Competition	Test	ODI	T20I	FC
Matches	3	6	1	67
Runs scored	21	27	1	1,138
Batting average	5.25	9.00	–	16.98
100s/50s	0/0	0/0	0/0	0/3
Top score	12	15	1*	85*
Balls bowled	481	225	18	10,804
Wickets	5	4	0	245
Bowling average	52.60	55.75	–	22.86
5 wickets in innings	0	0	–	9
10 wickets in match	0	0	–	0
Best bowling	2/54	1/31	–	6/58
Catches/stumpings	0/–	0/–	0/–	16/–
- Source: ESPNCricinfo, 15 February 2026

Ehsan Adil (Urdu: احسان عادل; born 15 March 1993) is a Pakistani-born cricketer who plays for the United States national cricket team. Before moving to the U.S. in July 2023, he played for Pakistan national cricket team from 2013 to 2015.

Ehsan is a right-hand bat and right-arm fast. He has represented Faisalabad Wolves, Habib Bank Limited cricket team and Pakistan Under-19 cricket team.

== Domestic career ==
=== Punjab ===
In March 2019, he was named in Punjab's squad for the 2019 Pakistan Cup. In September 2019, he was named in Central Punjab's squad for the 2019–20 Quaid-e-Azam Trophy tournament.

=== T20 franchise cricket ===
In addition to a stint with the Faisalabad Wolves, Adil played in the inaugural season of the Pakistan Super League for the Lahore Qalandars. He played five matches and took seven wickets.

Since 2023, Adil has played in Major League Cricket for MI New York, winning the 2023 and 2025 MLC seasons with the team.

== International career ==
=== Pakistan U-19 and Pakistan debut ===
He was a member of Pakistan's Under-19 team in the 2012 World Cup in Australia, and later that year made his first-class debut for Habib Bank, taking six wickets in his first game. Adil finished as the second-highest wicket-taker in the President's Trophy, the four-day domestic competition, taking 54 wickets at 17.88. Those numbers earned him a place in the Pakistan squad for the Test series in South Africa, and when Junaid Khan and Umar Gul were both unavailable for the Centurion game, Adil walked in for his Test debut in a three-man Pakistan pace attack that had a combined prior experience of two Tests. He dismissed Graeme Smith off his third ball in international cricket.

=== United States ===
Adil made his debut for the United States in the 2026 Men's T20 World Cup against Pakistan, replacing Jasdeep Singh who was out due to injury.
