= Al Amarat =

Al ‘Āmrāt العامرات Al Amirat
- Province
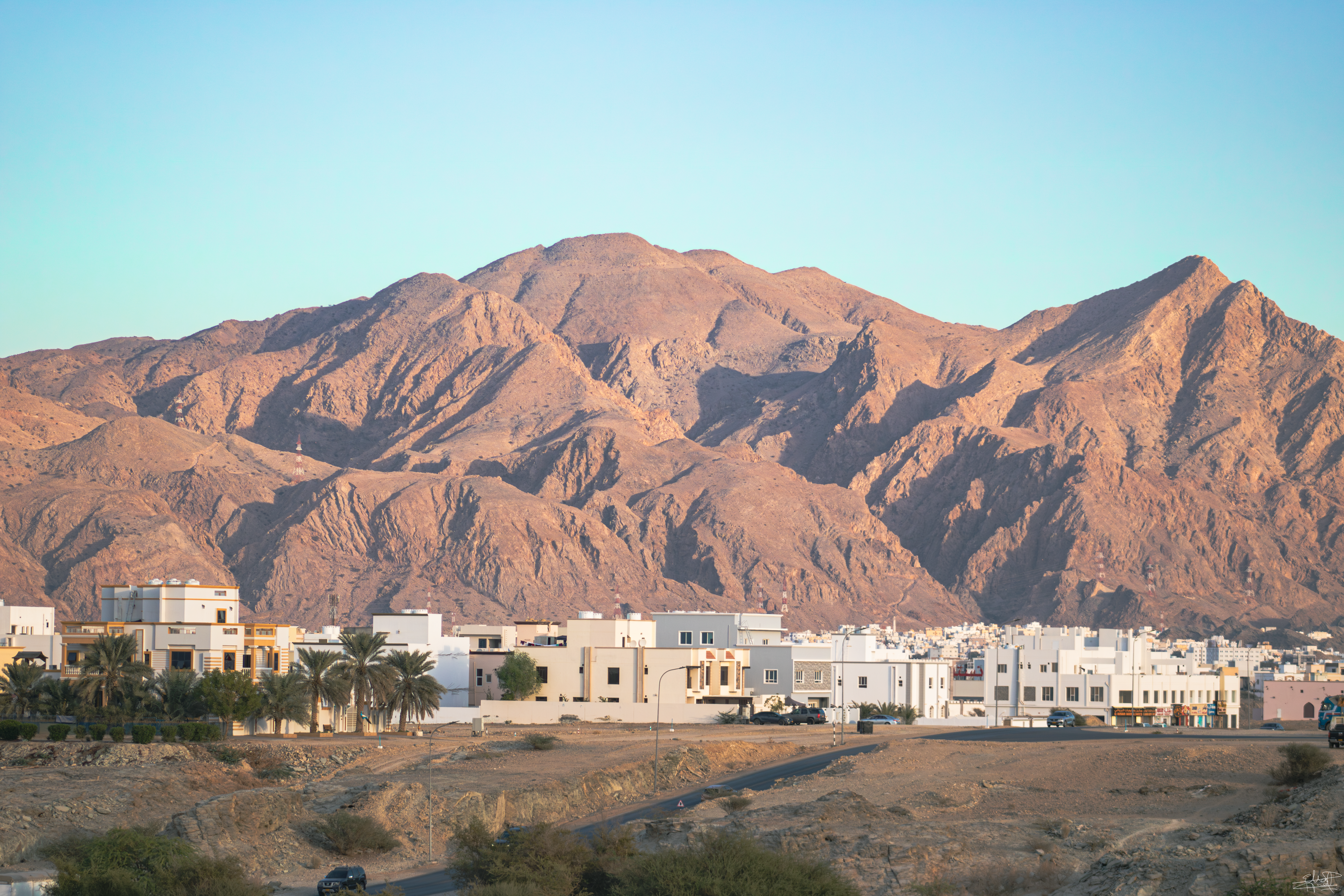
- Al Amarat
- Interactive map outlining al Amarat Province
- Location in Oman
- Coordinates: 23°31′27″N 58°29′56″E
- Country: Oman
- Governorate: Muscat Governorate

Population (2020)
  - Total: 121,103
- Time zone: UTC+4 (Oman Standard Time)

Al ‘Āmrāt (Arabic: العامرات) or Al Amarat is a city in Muscat, in northeastern Oman.

Al Amarat is the fifth (out of six) most populated province in the Muscat Governorate after Muscat itself, As Seeb, Bawshar and Muttrah.

Al Amarat is categorized as a Wilayat with its own Wali (Mayor) office, municipality, police station, and government offices.

== Location and Surrounding states ==
Al Amarat is located in the middle of Muscat Governate, surrounding it Muttrah from the north, and Bawshar from the west, and Muscat (the state) from the east, and Dema Wa Thaieen from the south west.

== History landmarks in Al Amarat ==
The state merges the past and present as there are existing houses and Souqs that are made from Omani Sarooj which is proved to be standing strong until now. There are also a couple of forts and defensive towers scattered across the state. In addition to that, there is also the historical AlKhufaiji Mosque, which is believed to be built in the reign of Sayed Hilal Bin Ahmed Al Busaidi (The eldest son of Ahmed bin Said, the first of the Al Said Dynasty) which is circa 1750. The mosque was built from cement and gravel, and it is located at a top of a hill, there is a long staircase leading to the mosque made from Gypsum.

== Al Amarat People ==
Al Amarat people were not different from other Omanis, the majority of people worked in farming and livestock caring, the locals excel in pottery and have their unique artistic touches in their craft. Al Sirren Nature reserve is also located in the state, which mainly preserves the life of Capra and Gazelle.

== Al Amarat Mountain View point ==
The path from Bawshar to Al Amarat is noted for its many sharp curves and sudden changes in elevation due to the mountainous surroundings. The trail is also known for its scenic view of the area especially when one is at a higher elevation point.
