= Peter-Daniel Blignaut =

Namibian cricketer

Personal information
- Full name: Peter-Daniel Blignaut
- Born: 21 October 2005 (age 21); Windhoek, Namibia
- Batting: Right-handed
- Bowling: Left-arm orthodox
- Role: Bowler

International information
- National side: Namibia
- Only ODI (cap 43): 22 September 2024 v United States
- T20I debut (cap 25): 27 February 2024 v Nepal
- Last T20I: 29 February 2024 v Netherlands
- Source: Cricinfo, 16 February 2024

Peter-Daniel Blignaut (born 21 October 2005) is a Namibian cricketer.

== International career ==
In December 2023, he was selected to the national side for the U-19 Cricket World Cup. In February 2024, he was selected to the Namibia national team for a tri-series event in Nepal. He made his Twenty20 International (T20I) debut on 27 February 2024, against Nepal at Kirtipur.
