= Shubham Ranjane =

Indian cricketer (born 1994)

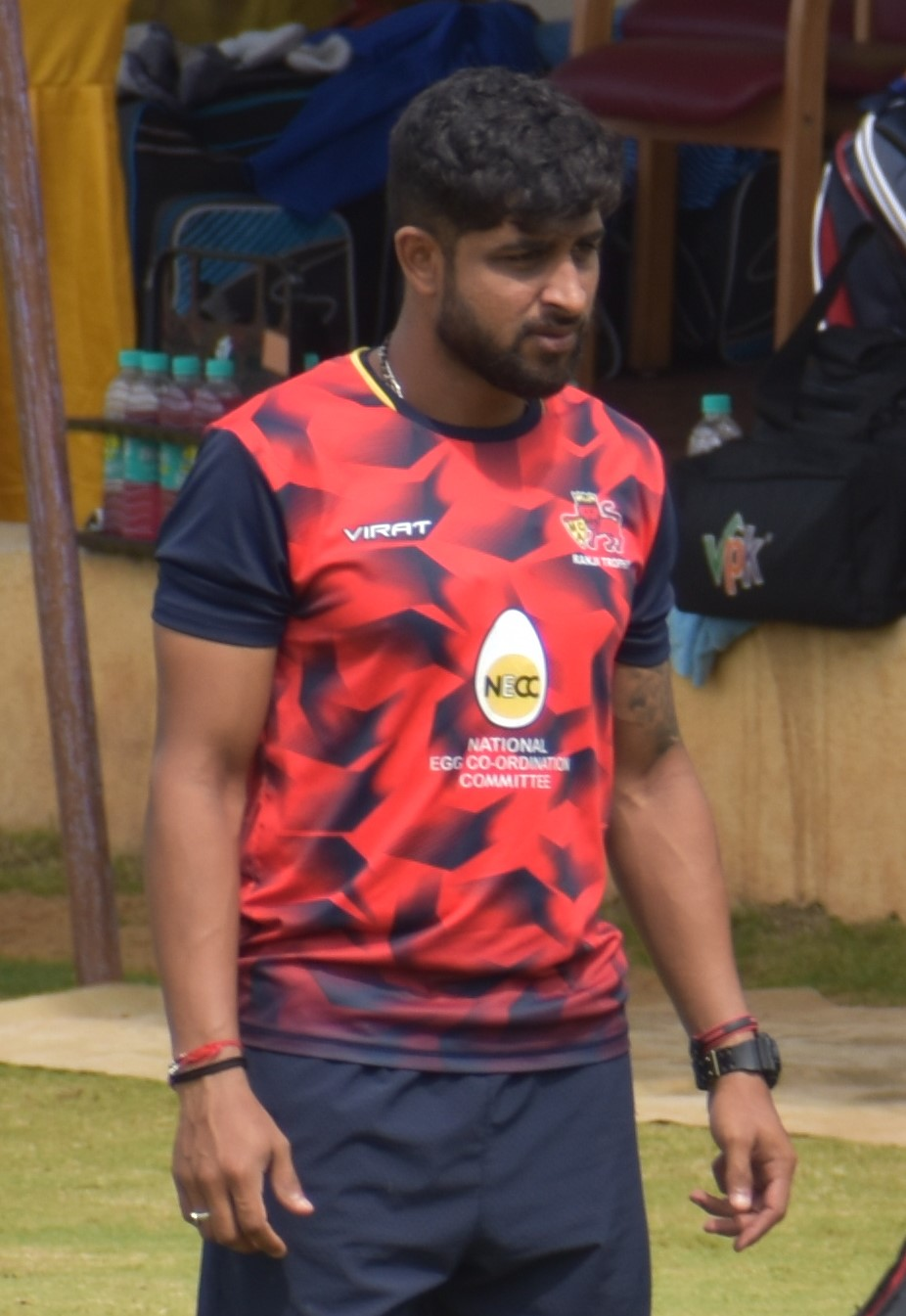
- Ranjane during the 2019–20 Vijay Hazare Trophy

Personal information
- Full name: Shubham Subhash Ranjane
- Born: 26 March 1994 (age 32); Pune, Maharashtra, India
- Role: All-rounder
- Relatives: Vasant Ranjane (grandfather); Subhash Ranjane (father)

International information
- National side: United States (2025–present)
- ODI debut (cap 50): 26 October 2025 v Nepal
- Last ODI: 12 June 2026 v Canada
- T20I debut (cap 52): 7 February 2026 v India
- Last T20I: 15 February 2026 v Namibia

Domestic team information
- Years: Team
- 2011/12-2015/16: Maharashtra
- 2016/17-2020/21: Mumbai
- 2021/22: Goa
- 2023-present: Seattle Orcas
- 2025-present: Dhaka Capitals
- 2025-present: Texas Super Kings

Career statistics
| Competition | ODI | T20I | FC | LA |
|---|---|---|---|---|
| Matches | 11 | 4 | 15 | 34 |
| Runs scored | 190 | 141 | 595 | 468 |
| Batting average | 27.14 | 70.50 | 31.31 | 24.63 |
| 100s/50s | 0/1 | 0/1 | 0/5 | 0/1 |
| Top score | 59 | 51 | 76* | 59* |
| Balls bowled | 420 | 24 | 954 | 1,031 |
| Wickets | 13 | 1 | 12 | 27 |
| Bowling average | 28.69 | 26.00 | 37.83 | 31.40 |
| 5 wickets in innings | 0 | 0 | 1 | 0 |
| 10 wickets in match | 0 | 0 | 0 | 0 |
| Best bowling | 3/61 | 1/6 | 5/49 | 3/34 |
| Catches/stumpings | 6/– | 2/– | 11/– | 14/– |
- Source: ESPNcricinfo, 27 September 2026

Shubham Subhash Ranjane (born 26 March 1994) is an Indian-American cricketer who plays as an all rounder for the United States national cricket team. He is a right handed middle order batter and right arm medium pace bowler. He played first-class cricket in India before moving to the United States.

== Career ==
Ranjane made his first-class debut for Mumbai in the 2016–17 Ranji Trophy on 21 November 2016. In December 2018, he was bought by the Rajasthan Royals in the player auction for the 2019 Indian Premier League. However, he did not play any matches for the team and was released by the Royals ahead of the 2020 IPL auction. He later represented Goa in the 2021–22 Ranji Trophy.

Ranjane was bought by Seattle Orcas for the 2023 Major League Cricket season. He moved to Texas Super Kings ahead of the 2025 Major League Cricket season. He also played for Joburg Super Kings in the 2026 SA20 and Sharjah Warriors in the 2025–26 International League T20.

In January 2026, Ranjane was named in the United States squad for the 2026 T20 World Cup. During the World Cup, he made his T20 International debut against India at the Wankhede Stadium on 7 February 2026. In the second match of the tournament, against Pakistan, he scored his maiden half-century in T20Is. He scored 51 runs off 30 deliveries in the match.
