= Saiteja Mukkamalla =

American cricketer (born 2004)

Personal information
- Full name: Saiteja Reddy Mukkamalla
- Born: April 9, 2004 (age 22); Plainsboro, New Jersey, United States
- Batting: Right-handed
- Bowling: Right-arm offbreak
- Role: Batsman

International information
- National side: United States
- ODI debut (cap 38): May 28, 2022 v Scotland
- Last ODI: November 3, 2025 v UAE
- T20I debut (cap 40): August 27, 2024 v Canada
- Last T20I: February 15, 2026 v Namibia

Domestic team information
- Years: Team
- 2021-present: New Jersey Stallions
- 2023-present: Texas Super Kings

Career statistics
Competition	ODI	T20I	LA	T20
Matches	37	21	37	33
Runs scored	1,255	737	1,255	917
Batting average	39.21	40.94	39.21	32.75
100s/50s	3/7	1/6	3/7	1/6
Top score	137*	100*	137*	100*
Catches/stumpings	13/–	7/–	13/–	9/–
- Source: ESPNcricinfo, February 15, 2026

Saiteja Reddy Mukkamalla (/saɪˈteɪdʒə mʊˈkːɑːmələ/, sai-TAY-jə mook-KAH-mə-lə; born April 9, 2004) is an American professional cricketer who plays for the Texas Super Kings of MLC, and the United States national cricket team. Primarily an opening batsman, he also bowls right-arm off-break occasionally.

== Career ==
In May 2022, he was selected to play in the ICC Cricket World Cup League 2 Series. He made his ODI debut against Scotland at Pearland on May 28, 2022. He scored 14 runs off 12 balls in his first match. In May 2023, he was selected in USA's squad for the 2023 Cricket World Cup Qualifier played in Zimbabwe. During the 2023 Cricket World Cup Qualifier, his unbeaten ton propelled USA to an impressive win over UAE in the play-off. He smashed 12 fours to play a match-winning unbeaten knock of 120 runs off just 114 balls. He was declared Man of the Match for this effort. In 2023, he was signed up by Texas Super Kings for the Major League Cricket. In the same year, he was also picked by Bangla Tigers in the 2023 Abu Dhabi T10 league.

In January 2026, Mukkamalla was named in USA's squad for the 2026 T20 World Cup.

On May 16, 2026, Mukkamalla captained the USA for the first time in an ODI against Nepal, filling in for Monank Patel who had been forced out of the side due to a finger injury.
