= Smit Patel =

Indian-American cricketer (born 1993)

Personal information
- Full name: Smit Patel
- Born: 16 May 1993 (age 33); Ahmedabad, Gujarat, India
- Batting: Right-handed
- Role: Wicket-keeper

International information
- National side: United States
- ODI debut (cap 44): 13 August 2024 v Canada
- Last ODI: 17 May 2025 v Canada
- T20I debut (cap 43): 30 September 2024 v United Arab Emirates
- Last T20I: 1 October 2024 v Canada

Domestic team information
- Years: Team
- 2011–2021: Gujarat
- 2021: Barbados Royals (squad no. 6)
- 2023-present: San Francisco Unicorns

Career statistics
Competition	FC	ODI	T20I	LA
Matches	55	13	2	56
Runs scored	3728	457	35	1,691
Batting average	39.49	41.54	17.50	34.51
100s/50s	11/14	1/2	0/9	3/10
Top score	236	152*	24	152
Catches/stumpings	114/9	15/1	0/0	59/6
- Source: Cricinfo, 5 November, 2024

Smit Kamleshbhai Patel (born 16 May 1993) is an American cricketer. Patel plays as a wicket-keeper, represented the India Under-19 cricket team World Cup winning squad in 2012, and has also played for the Gujarat cricket team.

He scored unbeaten 62 runs and helped to secured in India's to Under-19s World Cup glory at Tony Ireland Stadium. Patel and Unmukt Chand shared an unbroken 130-run stand for the fifth wicket after India had slipped from 75 for 1 to 97 for 4.

In December 2012, Patel made his maiden first-class century in only his fifth game to lead a strong Gujarat batting performance against Hyderabad at Sardar Vallabhbhai Patel Stadium in Valsad. He was the leading run-scorer for Tripura in the 2017–18 Ranji Trophy, with 526 runs in six matches.

In May 2021, Patel retired from all cricket under the remit of the Board of Control for Cricket in India (BCCI) to be eligible to play cricket in the United States. In June 2021, he was selected to take part in the Minor League Cricket tournament in the United States following the players' draft.
