= Nosthush Kenjige =

American cricketer (born 1991)

Personal information
- Full name: Nosthusha Pradeep Kenjige
- Born: March 2, 1991 (age 35); Auburn, Alabama, U.S.
- Batting: Left-handed
- Bowling: Slow left-arm orthodox
- Role: All-rounder

International information
- National side: United States (2019–present)
- ODI debut (cap 28): December 8, 2019 v UAE
- Last ODI: November 1, 2025 v Nepal
- T20I debut (cap 30): April 7, 2024 v Canada
- Last T20I: February 13, 2026 v Netherlands

Domestic team information
- Years: Team
- 2021-2023: Dallas Mustangs
- 2023-present: MI New York
- 2024: MI Emirates
- 2024-present: Michigan Cricket Stars

Career statistics
Competition	ODI	T20I	LA	T20
Matches	61	24	82	37
Runs scored	413	10	489	28
Batting average	17.20	2.00	16.86	4.66
100s/50s	0/0	0/0	0/0	0/0
Top score	43	6*	43	9*
Balls bowled	2,971	442	3,889	692
Wickets	69	22	91	35
Bowling average	30.36	25.18	30.34	25.34
5 wickets in innings	1	0	1	0
10 wickets in match	0	0	0	0
Best bowling	5/11	3/21	5/11	3/21
Catches/stumpings	28/–	4/–	34/–	6/–
- Source: ESPNcricinfo, February 15, 2026

Nosthush Pradeep Kenjige (/ˈnoːstʊʃ prəˈdiːp ˈkendʒɪɡeː/, NOS-toosh KEN-jig-ay; born March 2, 1991) is an American professional cricketer who plays for MI New York of MLC and the United States national cricket team. He is a left-handed batsman and left-arm orthodox bowler.

== Personal life ==
Kenjige was born in Auburn, Alabama, where his father worked as an agricultural researcher at Tuskegee University. He and his family moved to India before he turned one, to Chikkamagaluru District in Karnataka, where his father runs a coffee farm. Kenjige studied in The Lawrence School, Lovedale where he represented the school cricket team across different age categories. Kenjige played university cricket in Bengaluru representing Dayananda Sagar College of Engineering. He moved back to the U.S. in 2015, first to Virginia and then to New York, where he found work as a Biomedical Engineer.

== International career ==
He made his debut for the U.S. national side in May 2017 in the 2017 ICC World Cricket League Division Three in Uganda. In January 2018, he was named in the United States squad for the 2017–18 Regional Super50 tournament in the West Indies. He made his List A debut for the United States against the Leeward Islands in the 2017–18 Regional Super50 on January 31, 2018.

In August 2018, he was named in the United States' squad for the 2018–19 ICC World Twenty20 Americas Qualifier tournament in Morrisville, North Carolina. He was the leading wicket-taker in the tournament, with twelve dismissals in six matches. In October 2018, he was named in the United States' squads for the 2018–19 Regional Super50 tournament in the West Indies and for the 2018 ICC World Cricket League Division Three tournament in Oman.

In February 2019, he was named in the United States' Twenty20 International (T20I) squad for their series against the United Arab Emirates, but he did not play. The matches were the first T20I fixtures to be played by the United States cricket team. In April 2019, he was named in the United States cricket team's squad for the 2019 ICC World Cricket League Division Two tournament in Namibia.

In June 2019, he was named in a 30-man training squad for the United States cricket team, ahead of the Regional Finals of the 2018–19 ICC T20 World Cup Americas Qualifier tournament in Bermuda. The following month, he was one of twelve players to sign a three-month central contract with USA Cricket. In September 2019, he was named in United States's One Day International (ODI) squad for the 2019 United States Tri-Nation Series. In November 2019, he was named in the United States' squad for the 2019–20 Regional Super50 tournament.

In December 2019, he was named in the United States' One Day International (ODI) squad for the 2019 United Arab Emirates Tri-Nation Series. He made his ODI debut for the United States, against the United Arab Emirates on December 8, 2019.

In March 2024, he was named in the United States' squad for their T20I series against Canada. He made his T20I debut for USA on April 7, 2024, against Canada.

In January 2026, Kenjige was named in USA's squad for the 2026 T20 World Cup.

== Franchise career ==
In June 2021, he was selected to take part in the Minor League Cricket tournament in the United States following the players' draft.
