= Shayan Jahangir =

American cricketer (born 1994)

Personal information
- Born: December 24, 1994 (age 31); Karachi, Pakistan
- Batting: Right-handed
- Bowling: Right-arm fast-medium
- Role: Wicket-keeper, Batter

International information
- National side: United States (2022–present)
- ODI debut (cap 41): November 20, 2022 v Namibia
- Last ODI: November 3, 2025 v UAE
- T20I debut (cap 38): May 25, 2024 v Bangladesh
- Last T20I: February 15, 2026 v Namibia

Domestic team information
- Years: Team
- 2020: Barbados Tridents
- 2023-present: MI New York
- 2026: Hyderabad Kingsmen

Career statistics
Competition	ODI	T20I	FC	LA
Matches	32	22	4	38
Runs scored	795	462	53	868
Batting average	33.12	30.80	8.83	29.93
100s/50s	2/3	0/2	0/0	2/3
Top score	104	61	29	104
Balls bowled	–	–	12	18
Wickets	–	–	0	1
Bowling average	–	–	–	14.00
5 wickets in innings	–	–	–	0
10 wickets in match	–	–	–	0
Best bowling	–	–	–	1/9
Catches/stumpings	21/1	8/3	5/–	25/1
- Source: Cricinfo, February 15, 2026

Shayan Jahangir (born December 24, 1994) is a cricketer who plays for the United States national cricket team. He is a right-handed batsman and wicket-keeper.

== Domestic and franchise career ==
He made his first-class debut for Pakistan International Airlines in the 2014–15 Quaid-e-Azam Trophy on 12 October 2014. In July 2020, he was named in the Barbados Tridents squad for the 2020 Caribbean Premier League (CPL). He made his Twenty20 debut on 5 September 2020, for the Barbados Tridents in the CPL.

== International career ==
Jahangir played seven youth one-dayers for the Pakistan national under-19 cricket team in 2013.

In January 2021, USA Cricket named Jahangir in a 44-man squad to begin training in Texas ahead of the 2021 Oman Tri-Nation Series. In November 2022, Jahangir made his ODI debut for USA against Namibia.

Jahangir made his first ODI century against Nepal in the 2023 Cricket World Cup Qualifier in Zimbabwe, scoring 100 not out from 79 balls from seventh in the batting order.

In January 2026, Jahangir was named in USA's squad for the 2026 T20 World Cup.
