= Jessy Singh =

American cricketer (born 1993)

Jasdeep Singh
Personal information
- Full name: Jasdeep Singh
- Born: February 10, 1993 (age 33); Queens, New York, United States
- Batting: Right-handed
- Bowling: Right-arm medium
- Role: All-rounder

International information
- National side: United States (2015–present)
- ODI debut (cap 17): April 27, 2019 v PNG
- Last ODI: November 3, 2025 v UAE
- T20I debut (cap 3): March 15, 2019 v UAE
- Last T20I: April 27, 2025 v Canada

Career statistics
| Competition | ODI | T20I | FC | LA |
|---|---|---|---|---|
| Matches | 45 | 30 | 5 | 58 |
| Runs scored | 304 | 91 | 79 | 371 |
| Batting average | 12.66 | 7.58 | 11.28 | 11.59 |
| 100s/50s | 0/0 | 0/0 | 0/0 | 0/0 |
| Top score | 38 | 31 | 27 | 38 |
| Balls bowled | 2,002 | 624 | 705 | 2,426 |
| Wickets | 54 | 31 | 9 | 63 |
| Bowling average | 34.42 | 28.67 | 46.88 | 35.74 |
| 5 wickets in innings | 0 | 0 | 0 | 0 |
| 10 wickets in match | 0 | 0 | 0 | 0 |
| Best bowling | 4/18 | 3/22 | 4/38 | 4/18 |
| Catches/stumpings | 11/– | 12/– | 1/– | 11/– |
- Source: Cricinfo, February 15, 2026

Jasdeep "Jessy" Singh (born February 10, 1993) is an American cricketer who made his debut for the U.S. national team in May 2015. He is a right-arm medium-pace bowler who bats right-handed.

== Personal life ==
Singh was born in Queens, New York, to Indian Punjabi parents. He and his family moved to India when he was three years old, but when he was 13 they returned to the United States and settled in New Jersey.

== Domestic and franchise career ==
Singh took a hat-trick for a Cricket League of New Jersey representative team against Minnesota in 2012. He has also played for clubs in New York City. At the 2014 National Championships in Florida, which was played between eight regional teams, he played for the Central West Region side, which primarily draws its players from leagues in Texas.

Singh made his first-class debut for Kalutara Physical Culture Club in Sri Lanka's Premier League Tournament Tier B on December 21, 2016, against Sri Lanka Ports Authority Cricket Club. He made his List A debut for ICC Americas in the 2016–17 Regional Super50 on January 26, 2017. In October 2018, he was named in the United States' squad for the 2018–19 Regional Super50 tournament in the West Indies.

In June 2019, he was selected to play for the Toronto Nationals franchise team in the 2019 Global T20 Canada tournament. However, in July 2019, Singh withdrew from the Global T20 Canada tournament, after signing a 12-month central contract with USA Cricket.

In July 2020, he was named in the Guyana Amazon Warriors squad for the 2020 Caribbean Premier League. In June 2021, he was selected to take part in the Minor League Cricket tournament in the United States following the players' draft.

== International career ==
Singh was called into the national squad in April 2015, for the 2015 Americas Twenty20 Championship the following month. He was one of only four American-born players in the team, the others being Akeem Dodson, Hammad Shahid, and Steven Taylor. However, at the tournament he featured in only one match, taking 0/15 opening the bowling with Muhammad Ghous. Singh was retained in the U.S. squad for the 2015 World Twenty20 Qualifier in Ireland and Scotland, and went on to make his Twenty20 debut in the opening match of the tournament against Nepal.

In February 2019, he was named in the United States' Twenty20 International (T20I) squad for their series against the United Arab Emirates. The matches were the first T20I fixtures to be played by the United States cricket team. He made his T20I debut for the United States against the United Arab Emirates on March 15, 2019.

In April 2019, he was named in the United States cricket team's squad for the 2019 ICC World Cricket League Division Two tournament in Namibia. The United States finished in the top four places in the tournament, therefore gaining One Day International (ODI) status. Singh made his ODI debut for the United States on April 27, 2019, against Papua New Guinea, in the tournament's third-place playoff.

In June 2019, he was named in a 30-man training squad for the United States cricket team, ahead of the Regional Finals of the 2018–19 ICC T20 World Cup Americas Qualifier tournament in Bermuda. In August 2019, he was named in the final squad for the tournament. In November 2019, he was named in the United States' squad for the 2019–20 Regional Super50 tournament.

In January 2026, he was named in USA's squad for the 2026 T20 World Cup.
