= Harmeet Singh (American cricketer) =

Indian-born cricketer

Harmeet Singh Baddhan
Personal information
- Born: September 7, 1992 (age 34); Bombay, India
- Batting: Left-handed
- Bowling: Slow left-arm orthodox
- Role: Bowler

International information
- National side: United States
- ODI debut (cap 45): August 13, 2024 v Canada
- Last ODI: June 12, 2026 v Canada
- T20I debut (cap 32): April 7, 2024 v Canada
- Last T20I: February 15, 2025 v Namibia

Domestic team information
- Years: Team
- 2013: Rajasthan Royals
- 2021-2023: Seattle Thunderbolts
- 2023: Atlanta Riders
- 2023–present: Seattle Orcas
- 2024–present: Dallas Xforia Giants
- 2024: Sudurpaschim Royals
- 2025: Sharjah Warriorz
- 2026: Dublin Guardians

Career statistics
Competition	ODI	T20I	FC	LA
Matches	29	29	31	48
Runs scored	350	242	733	505
Batting average	21.87	15.12	15.59	17.41
100s/50s	0/2	0/0	1/1	0/2
Top score	59	38	102	59
Balls bowled	1,483	616	5,783	2,461
Wickets	39	31	87	60
Bowling average	26.00	23.09	34.18	28.71
5 wickets in innings	1	0	4	2
10 wickets in match	0	0	0	0
Best bowling	6/27	4/18	6/110	6/27
Catches/stumpings	8/–	8/–	16/–	18/–
- Source: ESPNcricinfo, September 25, 2026

Harmeet Singh Baddhan (born September 7, 1992) is an Indian-born cricketer who plays for the Seattle Orcas, and the United States national cricket team.

He played for Mumbai and Tripura before moving to the United States to pursue a career in the Major League Cricket tournament. He relocated from Mumbai after citing frustration with selection politics in Indian cricket. He subsequently joined the Seattle Thunderbolts in Minor League Cricket and qualified for the United States national cricket team by residency, making his Twenty20 International debut for the United States in 2024.

== Domestic and franchise career ==
He was part of the India Under-19 cricket team in the 2012 ICC Under-19 Cricket World Cup. He is a slow left-arm orthodox bowler who was a member of the Rajasthan Royals squad during the 2013 Indian Premier League.

He was the leading wicket-taker for Tripura in the 2018–19 Vijay Hazare Trophy, with thirteen dismissals in eight matches. In August 2021 he moved to Seattle where he captains the Seattle Thunderbolts in Minor League Cricket. Singh was selected first overall in the MLC draft by the Seattle Orcas. He became the first player to be drafted to a team in MLC.

== International career ==
In March 2024, he was named in the United States' squad for their Twenty20 International (T20I) series against Canada, and made his T20I debut against them on April 7, 2024.

In January 2026, Baddhan was named in USA's squad for the 2026 T20 World Cup. where he notably took the wickets of Indian stars like Hardik Pandya and Axar Patel.

== Controversies ==
2013 IPL spot-fixing scandal: While playing for the Rajasthan Royals, Harmeet was accused by a bookie of being involved in spot-fixing, according to reports from ESPN and NDTV Sports. While bookies reportedly considered approaching him, they ultimately did not because of his young age. He was later cleared of all charges by the police and the BCCI disciplinary committee.

2017 railway station incident: Harmeet was arrested by the Mumbai Police in February 2017 after driving his car onto Platform 1 of the Andheri railway station in Mumbai during the morning rush hour. He claimed he was misled while trying to park his car, say reporters at Wisden.

He was booked by the Railway Protection Force (RPF) under multiple sections of the Railway Act, including:

Section 147: Trespass.
Section 145(b): Creating a nuisance.
Section 154: Endangering the safety of passengers.
Outcome: He was produced before a metropolitan magistrate and subsequently granted bail.

IPL auction misidentity case: Due to similar names, his 2017 incident caused confusion, leading to another cricketer, Harpreet Singh, losing out on IPL bids.

2023 MLC misconduct: More recently, even after relocating to the United States, while playing for the Seattle Orcas in Major League Cricket, he was fined 20% of his match fee for a Level 1 breach of the Code of Conduct for making a disparaging language or gestures toward a batter. However, this controversy is less known that the other three mentioned above.
