= Monank Patel =

American cricketer (born 1993)

Personal information
- Born: May 1, 1993 (age 33); Anand, Gujarat, India
- Batting: Right-handed
- Role: Wicket Keeper Batsman

International information
- National side: United States (2019–present)
- ODI debut (cap 21): April 27, 2019 v PNG
- Last ODI: October 13, 2026 v Namibia
- ODI shirt no.: 1
- T20I debut (cap 7): March 15, 2019 v UAE
- Last T20I: February 15, 2026 v Namibia

Domestic team information
- Years: Team
- 2023–present: MI New York

Career statistics
Competition	ODI	T20I	LA	T20
Matches	79	47	91	70
Runs scored	2,570	1,011	2,946	1,657
Batting average	34.72	27.32	34.65	27.61
100s/50s	4/19	1/7	4/22	1/12
Top score	130	104	130	104
Catches/stumpings	42/2	25/12	47/2	33/12
- Source: ESPNcricinfo, February 15, 2026

Monank Dilipbhai Patel (born May 1, 1993) is an American cricketer and the current captain of the United States men's national cricket team. A right-handed batter and wicket-keeper, Patel has been a central figure in the growth of American cricket since his debut in 2019. Under his leadership, the USA recorded landmark wins, including a group-stage victory over Pakistan at the 2024 ICC Men's T20 World Cup. He currently represents MI New York in Major League Cricket (MLC).

== Early life ==
Patel, son of Dilipbhai Patel, was born on May 1, 1993, in Anand, Gujarat, India. He played for Gujarat at the under-16 and under-18 levels. Patel received a green card in 2010 and moved to the United States permanently in 2016 to open a restaurant, settling in New Jersey.

== International career ==
In August 2018, he was named in the United States squad for the 2018–19 ICC World Twenty20 Americas Qualifier tournament in Morrisville, North Carolina. He was the leading run-scorer in the tournament, with 208 runs in six matches.

In October 2018, he was named in the United States' squad for the 2018–19 Regional Super50 tournament in the West Indies. He made his List A debut for the United States against Combined Campuses and Colleges on October 6, 2018. On October 22, in the match against Jamaica, Patel scored the first century by an American batsman in the tournament. He finished as the leading run-scorer for the United States in the competition, with 290 runs in seven matches.

Later the same month, he was named in the United States squad for the 2018 ICC World Cricket League Division Three tournament in Oman. Ahead of the tournament, he was named as the player to watch in the United States' squad. In the United States' opening match of the tournament, against Uganda, he scored 107 runs.

In February 2019, he was named in the United States Twenty20 International (T20I) squad for their series against the United Arab Emirates. The matches were the first T20I fixtures to be played by the United States cricket team. He made his T20I debut against the United Arab Emirates on March 15, 2019.

In April 2019, he was named in the United States cricket team's squad for the 2019 ICC World Cricket League Division Two tournament in Namibia. The United States finished in the top four places in the tournament, which led to them gaining the One Day International (ODI) status. Patel made his ODI debut for the United States on 27 April 2019, against Papua New Guinea, in the tournament's third-place playoff.

In June 2019, he was named in a 30-man training squad for the United States cricket team, ahead of the Regional Finals of the 2018–19 ICC T20 World Cup Americas Qualifier tournament in Bermuda. The following month, he was one of five players to sign a 12-month central contract with USA Cricket. In August 2019, he was named in the United States squad for the Regional Finals of the 2018–19 ICC T20 World Cup Americas Qualifier tournament.

In November 2019, Patel was named in the United States squad for the 2019–20 Regional Super50 tournament. He was the leading run-scorer for the United States in the tournament, with 230 runs in eight matches. In June 2021, he was selected for the Minor League Cricket tournament in the United States following the players' draft.

In August 2021, Patel was named in the United States squad for the 2021 Oman Tri-Nation Series. In the opening match of the series, Patel scored his first century in ODI cricket.

In October 2021, he was named as the captain of the American squad for the 2021 ICC Men's T20 World Cup Americas Qualifier tournament in Antigua.

In May 2024, Monank was named the captain of the American squad for the 2024 ICC Men's T20 World Cup tournament. On June 6, he scored 50 runs against Pakistan which helped the USA team win their second consecutive league match. In the 2024 ICC Men's T20 World Cup, Monank Patel sustained an injury that led to his absence from subsequent matches. His injury significantly impacted the team's performance, as he was unable to participate further in the tournament.

In January 2026, he was named the captain for USA's squad for the 2026 T20 World Cup.

== Franchise career ==
In the inaugural 2023 MLC season, MI New York acquired Patel in the 5th round for a salary cap of $35,000. Patel managed to score run off ball eight in the opening match against San Francisco Unicorns and initially struggled batting at one down. Later, he was promoted to opening against Texas Super Kings but ended scoring a two-ball duck, but showed a glimpse of form in the very next match against Washington Freedom scoring 44 runs off 29 balls. He concluded the season with only 63 runs in 6 innings at a poor average of 10.5, as MI New York finished fourth in the league stage, qualifying for play-offs. They eventually reached the final and won that season. Patel was benched in the final after the challenger match against Texas Super Kings, due to a series of poor performances. Despite an average season, he was retained ahead of 2024 MLC season. Patel began with a series of low scores but found form with a half-century in his third match against Texas Super Kings, also making it his 1st half-century in MLC. Despite a good start, he continued to struggle that season concluding only 133 runs in 7 innings at an average of just 19 as MI New York finished fourth again in the league stage, making it to eliminator match against Texas Super Kings. However, he was dismissed on 48 runs off 41, as MI New York lost to Super Kings by 9 wickets ending their campaign.

Despite his poor performance on the first 2 seasons, the 2025 Major League Cricket season told a very different story, where Monank Patel had a stellar performance, finishing as the leading run-scorer (Orange Cap winner) with 478 runs in 13 innings for MI New York. He recorded four fifties, including a career-best 93, averaged over 36, and also earned the Bart King Domestic Player of the Tournament award. His highest score in a match was a 93 vs Seattle Orcas (highest by an American in MLC history at the time) where MI New York won the match by 7 wickets chasing down 200 runs.

== Career Summary ==
Patel has made 4 centuries in international cricket which include 3 centuries in ODIs and 1 century in T20I. He has scored over 3,000 runs representing USA in more than 100 matches.

== Captaincy ==
=== T20I ===
In October 2021, Patel was appointed captain of the USA team replacing Saurabh Netravalkar in T20I. Just after his appointment, he showed his impact by marking the occasion of USA's first-ever T20I victory against a full member by defeating Ireland, later finishing the series in a 1–1 marking a huge achievement. Just before the 2024 T20 World Cup, Patel made a memorable achievement on Bangladesh tour of United States by defeating Bangladesh in the 1st and 2nd T20I sealing the series by 2–1 marking USA's first-ever T20I series victory against a full member.

=== Overall Record ===
Monank Patel captaincy record
Type	Matches	Won	Lost	Tied	NR	Win%
T20I	35	23	8	3	1	65.71%
ODI	52	31	18	3	–	59.61%
Total	87	54	26	6	1	62.06%

== Controversies ==
ICC Code of Conduct Breach (2018): Patel received one demerit point for violating ICC CoC regarding player behavior by pointing toward the pavilion after dismissing a Kenya batter.

Drunk Incident (2019): A report submitted to USA Cricket administrators concluded that Taylor, Monank Patel, and others had turned up drunk for a team meeting in the UAE, the night before USA's last ODI against Scotland on the December tour of the UAE.

2024 T20 World Cup Incident: Following the USA's historic win against Pakistan during the 2024 Men's T20 World Cup, rumors and reports on social media and sites like Reddit indicated Patel was injured during celebrations, causing him to miss subsequent matches where Aaron Jones, the vice captain had to hold captaincy for the team.

Ball-Tampering Allegations (2024): During the 2024 T20 World Cup, Patel and the USA camp observed Pakistan's Fakhar Zaman acting suspiciously with the ball (hiding it under his shirt), which prompted a formal complaint in the captain's report.

2024 Staurt Law Controversy: Reports indicated a serious rift between Patel and former USA coach Stuart Law, which was part of a larger players' revolt against Law that resulted in Law's removal as USA's head coach.
