= Milind Kumar =

American cricketer (born 1991)

Personal information
- Born: February 15, 1991 (age 35); Delhi, New Delhi, India
- Batting: Right-handed
- Bowling: Right-arm off-break
- Role: Batsman

International information
- National side: United States
- ODI debut (cap 43): August 13, 2024 v Canada
- Last ODI: November 3, 2025 v UAE
- T20I debut (cap 33): April 7, 2024 v Canada
- Last T20I: February 15, 2026 v Namibia

Domestic team information
- Years: Team
- 2009/10–2017/18: Delhi
- 2016: Brothers Union
- 2018/19: Sikkim
- 2019/20–2020/21: Tripura
- 2024-present: Texas Super Kings
- 2025: Kathmandu Gorkhas

Career statistics
Competition	ODI	T20I	FC	LA
Matches	22	25	46	87
Runs scored	1,016	416	2,988	3,039
Batting average	67.73	29.71	46.68	49.01
100s/50s	3/7	0/1	9/15	4/25
Top score	155*	56*	261	155*
Balls bowled	732	192	2,342	1,370
Wickets	28	12	33	40
Bowling average	18.64	19.66	37.06	28.10
5 wickets in innings	1	1	1	1
10 wickets in match	0	0	0	0
Best bowling	5/66	5/16	5/42	5/66
Catches/stumpings	11/–	19/–	30/–	33/–
- Source: ESPNcricinfo, February 15, 2026

Milind Kumar (born February 15, 1991) is a cricketer who currently plays for the United States national cricket team. Before moving to America he played for Delhi, Sikkim, and Tripura in top-level Indian domestic cricket and for Brothers Union in Bangladesh. He is a right-handed batsman and an occasional off-break bowler.

== Early life ==
Milind Kumar was born on February 15, 1991, in Delhi, India to Suman Kumar, a banker. Before moving to the United States, he worked for the Oil and Natural Gas Corporation.

== Domestic career ==
He was bought by Delhi Daredevils in the IPL Season 7 Auction for INR 10 Lakh. He was bought by Royal Challengers Bangalore in IPL12 (2019) at his base price 20 lakhs.

Ahead of the 2018–19 Ranji Trophy, he was drafted from Delhi to Sikkim. he was the top scorer in 2018–19 Ranji Trophy with 1331 runs. In December 2018, he was bought by the Royal Challengers Bangalore in the player auction for the 2019 Indian Premier League.

In August 2019, he was named in the India Green team's squad for the 2019–20 Duleep Trophy. Later the same month, he left Sikkim cricket team ahead of the 2019–20 Ranji Trophy tournament. He was released by the Royal Challengers Bangalore ahead of the 2020 IPL auction.

In June 2021, he was selected to take part in the Minor League Cricket tournament in the United States following the players' draft.

In June 2023, Kumar was drafted in Round 4 by the Texas Super Kings to play in the inaugural season of Major League Cricket.

== International career ==
In March 2024, Kumar was named in the United States' squad for their Twenty20 International (T20I) series against Canada, and he made his T20I debut against Canada on April 7, 2024.

In January 2026, he was named in USA's squad for the 2026 T20 World Cup.
