= Namibia at the Men's T20 World Cup =

Namibia national team performance at T20 World Cup

The Namibia national cricket team is one of the associate members of the International Cricket Council (ICC), they are nicknamed as the Eagles. The team qualified for their first T20 World Cup in 2021, after finishing at 4th position in the 2019 qualifier, they have qualified for tournament three times in a row since then. In three editions that they have contested, the team has 4 wins in 11 matches.

In their maiden appearance, the team advanced from the first round into the Super 12 stage. They also managed to register their first-ever victory against a full member nation, after defeating Ireland in the first round. In the next edition, they defeated Sri Lanka, once again in the first round but were unable to progress to the next stage.

== T20 World Cup record ==
ICC T20 World Cup record										Qualification record (Note: WCL Division One served as the qualifier for the 2007 edition.)				
Year	Round	Position	Pld	W	L	T	NR	Ab (Note: Abandoned matches are not counted in the official records.)	Cap.	Pld	W	L	T	NR
(South Africa) 2007	Did not qualify									Did not participate				
(England) 2009	Did not qualify									Did not participate				
(Cricket West Indies) 2010	Did not qualify									Did not participate				
(Sri Lanka) 2012	Did not qualify									18	15	3	0	0
(Bangladesh) 2014	Did not qualify									9	4	5	0	0
(India) 2016	Did not qualify									13	7	5	0	1
(United Arab Emirates) (Oman) 2021	Super 12	10/16	8	3	5	0	0	0	Gerhard Erasmus	20	13	5	0	2
(Australia) 2022	First round	13/16	3	1	2	0	0	0	Gerhard Erasmus	Did not participate (qualified automatically)				
(United States) (Cricket West Indies) 2024	Group stage	15/20	4	0	3	1	0	0	Gerhard Erasmus	6	6	0	0	0
(India) (Sri Lanka) 2026	Group stage	19/20	4	0	4	0	0	0	Gerhard Erasmus	5	4	1	0	0
Total	0 Titles	4/10	19	4	14	1	0	0	—N/a	71	49	19	0	3

=== Record by opponents ===
Opponent	M	W	L	T+W	T+L	NR	Ab	Win %	First played
Afghanistan	1	0	1	0	0	0	0	0.00	2021
Australia	1	0	1	0	0	0	0	0.00	2024
England	1	0	1	0	0	0	0	0.00	2024
India	2	0	2	0	0	0	0	0.00	2021
Ireland	1	1	0	0	0	0	0	100	2021
Netherlands	3	1	2	0	0	0	0	33.33	2021
New Zealand	1	0	1	0	0	0	0	0.00	2021
Oman	1	0	0	1	0	0	0	100	2024
Pakistan	2	0	2	0	0	0	0	0.00	2021
Scotland	2	1	1	0	0	0	0	50.00	2021
Sri Lanka	2	1	1	0	0	0	0	50.00	2021
United Arab Emirates	1	0	1	0	0	0	0	0.00	2022
United States	1	0	1	0	0	0	0	0.00	2026
Total	19	4	14	1	0	0	0	21.05	—
Source: Last Updated: 8 March 2026

== Tournament results ==
=== Oman & UAE 2021 ===
Squad and kit

- Gerhard Erasmus (c)
- JJ Smit (vc)
- Stephan Baard
- Karl Birkenstock
- Michiel du Preez (wk)
- Jan Frylinck
- Zane Green (wk)
- Jan Nicol Loftie-Eaton
- Bernard Scholtz
- Ben Shikongo
- Ruben Trumpelmann
- Michael van Lingen
- David Wiese
- Craig Williams
- Pikky Ya France

2021 kit

Results

Event	First round (Group A)				Super 12 (Group 2)						Semifinal	Final	Overall Result
Event	Opposition Result	Opposition Result	Opposition Result	Rank	Opposition Result	Opposition Result	Opposition Result	Opposition Result	Opposition Result	Rank	Opposition Result	Opposition Result	Overall Result
2021	Sri Lanka; Lost by 7 wickets	Netherlands; Won by 6 wickets	Ireland; Won by 8 wickets	2	Scotland; Won by 4 wickets	Afghanistan; Lost by 62 runs	Pakistan; Lost by 45 runs	New Zealand; Lost by 52 runs	India; Lost by 9 wickets	5	Did not advance		Super 12
Source: Cricinfo

Scorecards

First round (Group A)

18 October 2021
18:00 (N)
Scorecard

Namibia; 96 (19.3 overs)	v	Sri Lanka; 100/3 (13.3 overs)
Craig Williams 29 (36); Maheesh Theekshana 3/25 (4 overs)		Bhanuka Rajapaksa 42* (27); JJ Smit 1/7 (1 over)

Sri Lanka won by 7 wickets
Sheikh Zayed Cricket Stadium, Abu Dhabi
Umpires: Adrian Holdstock (SA) and Paul Reiffel (Aus)
Player of the match: Maheesh Theekshana (SL)

- Sri Lanka won the toss and elected to field.

20 October 2021
14:00
Scorecard

Netherlands; 164/4 (20 overs)	v	Namibia; 166/4 (19 overs)
Max O'Dowd 70 (56); Jan Frylinck 2/36 (4 overs)		David Wiese 66* (40); Pieter Seelaar 1/8 (2 overs)

Namibia won by 6 wickets
Sheikh Zayed Cricket Stadium, Abu Dhabi
Umpires: Michael Gough (Eng) and Langton Rusere (Zim)
Player of the match: David Wiese (Nam)

- Namibia won the toss and elected to field.

22 October 2021
14:00
Scorecard

Ireland; 125/8 (20 overs)	v	Namibia; 126/2 (18.3 overs)
Paul Stirling 38 (24); Jan Frylinck 3/21 (4 overs)		Gerhard Erasmus 53* (49); Curtis Campher 2/14 (3 overs)

Namibia won by 8 wickets
Sharjah Cricket Stadium, Sharjah
Umpires: Chris Brown (NZ) and Aleem Dar (Pak)
Player of the match: David Wiese (Nam)

- Ireland won the toss and elected to bat.
- Namibia qualified for the Super 12 stage of the tournament as a result of this match,.

Super 12 (Group 2)

27 October 2021
18:00 (N)
Scorecard

Scotland; 109/8 (20 overs)	v	Namibia; 115/6 (19.1 overs)
Michael Leask 44 (27); Ruben Trumpelmann 3/17 (4 overs)		JJ Smit 32* (23); Michael Leask 2/12 (2 overs)

Namibia won by 4 wickets
Sheikh Zayed Cricket Stadium, Abu Dhabi
Umpires: Adrian Holdstock (SA) and Rod Tucker (Aus)
Player of the match: Ruben Trumpelmann (Nam)

- Namibia won the toss and elected to field.

31 October 2021
14:00
Scorecard

Afghanistan; 160/5 (20 overs)	v	Namibia; 98/9 (20 overs)
Mohammad Shahzad 45 (33); Jan Nicol Loftie-Eaton 2/21 (4 overs)		David Wiese 26 (30); Hamid Hassan 3/9 (4 overs)

Afghanistan won by 62 runs
Sheikh Zayed Cricket Stadium, Abu Dhabi
Umpires: Chris Gaffaney (NZ) and Ahsan Raza (Pak)
Player of the match: Naveen-ul-Haq (Afg)

- Afghanistan won the toss and elected to bat.

2 November 2021
18:00 (N)
Scorecard

Pakistan; 189/2 (20 overs)	v	Namibia; 144/5 (20 overs)
Mohammad Rizwan 79* (50); David Wiese 1/30 (4 overs)		David Wiese 43* (31); Imad Wasim 1/13 (3 overs)

Pakistan won by 45 runs
Sheikh Zayed Cricket Stadium, Abu Dhabi
Umpires: Chris Brown (NZ) and Chris Gaffaney (NZ)
Player of the match: Mohammad Rizwan (Pak)

- Pakistan won the toss and elected to bat.

5 November 2021
14:00
Scorecard

New Zealand; 163/4 (20 overs)	v	Namibia; 111/7 (20 overs)
Glenn Phillips 39* (21); Bernard Scholtz 1/15 (3 overs)		Michael van Lingen 25 (25); Tim Southee 2/15 (4 overs)

New Zealand won by 52 runs
Sharjah Cricket Stadium, Sharjah
Umpires: Paul Reiffel (Aus) and Paul Wilson (Aus)
Player of the match: James Neesham (NZ)

- Namibia won the toss and elected to field.

8 November 2021
18:00 (N)
Scorecard

Namibia; 132/8 (20 overs)	v	India; 136/1 (15.2 overs)
David Wiese 26 (25); Ravindra Jadeja 3/16 (4 overs)		Rohit Sharma 56 (37); Jan Frylinck 1/19 (2 overs)

India won by 9 wickets
Dubai International Cricket Stadium, Dubai
Umpires: Chris Brown (NZ) and Richard Illingworth (Eng)
Player of the match: Ravindra Jadeja (Ind)

- India won the toss and elected to field.

=== Australia 2022 ===
Squad and kit

- Gerhard Erasmus (c)
- JJ Smit (vc)
- Stephan Baard
- Karl Birkenstock
- Jan Frylinck
- Zane Green (wk)
- Divan la Cock
- Jan Nicol Loftie-Eaton
- Lo-handre Louwrens (wk)
- Tangeni Lungameni
- Bernard Scholtz
- Ben Shikongo
- Ruben Trumpelmann
- Michael van Lingen
- David Wiese
- Pikky Ya France

2022 kit

Results

Event	First round (Group A)				Super 12		Semifinal	Final	Overall Result
Event	Opposition Result	Opposition Result	Opposition Result	Rank	Opposition Result	Rank	Opposition Result	Opposition Result	Overall Result
2022	Sri Lanka; Won by 55 runs	Netherlands; Lost by 5 wickets	United Arab Emirates; Lost by 7 runs	3	Did not advance				First round
Source: Cricinfo

Scorecards

First round (Group A)

16 October 2022
15:00
Scorecard

Namibia; 163/7 (20 overs)	v	Sri Lanka; 108 (19 overs)
Jan Frylinck 44 (28); Pramod Madushan 2/37 (4 overs)		Dasun Shanaka 29 (23); David Wiese 2/16 (4 overs)

Namibia won by 55 runs
Kardinia Park, Geelong
Umpires: Rod Tucker (Aus) and Joel Wilson (WI)
Player of the match: Jan Frylinck (Nam)

- Sri Lanka won the toss and elected to field.

18 October 2022
15:00
Scorecard

Namibia; 121/6 (20 overs)	v	Netherlands; 122/5 (19.3 overs)
Jan Frylinck 43 (48); Bas de Leede 2/18 (3 overs)		Vikramjit Singh 39 (31); JJ Smit 2/24 (4 overs)

Netherlands won by 5 wickets
Kardinia Park, Geelong
Umpires: Richard Kettleborough (Eng) and Joel Wilson (WI)
Player of the match: Bas de Leede (Ned)

- Namibia won the toss and elected to bat.

20 October 2022
19:00 (N)
Scorecard

United Arab Emirates; 148/3 (20 overs)	v	Namibia; 141/8 (20 overs)
Muhammad Waseem 50 (41); Ben Shikongo 1/8 (1 over)		David Wiese 55 (36); Basil Hameed 2/17 (3 overs)

United Arab Emirates won by 7 runs
Kardinia Park, Geelong
Umpires: Richard Illingworth (Eng) and Richard Kettleborough (Eng)
Player of the match: Muhammad Waseem (UAE)

- United Arab Emirates won the toss and elected to bat.

=== United States & West Indies 2024 ===
Squad and kit

- Gerhard Erasmus (c)
- JJ Smit (vc)
- Jack Brassell
- Peter-Daniel Blignaut
- Niko Davin
- Jan Frylinck
- Zane Green (wk)
- Malan Kruger
- Dylan Leicher
- Tangeni Lungameni
- Jean-Pierre Kotze (wk)
- Bernard Scholtz
- Ben Shikongo
- Ruben Trumpelmann
- Michael van Lingen
- David Wiese

2024 kit

Results

Event	Group stage (Group B)					Super 8		Semifinal	Final	Overall Result
Event	Opposition Result	Opposition Result	Opposition Result	Opposition Result	Rank	Opposition Result	Rank	Opposition Result	Opposition Result	Overall Result
2024	Oman; Tied (Won the S/O)	Scotland; Lost by 5 wickets	Australia; Lost by 9 wickets	England; Lost by 41 runs (DLS)	4	Did not advance				Group stage
Source: Cricinfo

Scorecards

Group stage (Group B)

2 June 2024
20:30 UTC−4 (N)
Scorecard

Oman; 109 (19.4 overs)	v	Namibia; 109/6 (20 overs)
Khalid Kail 34 (39); Ruben Trumpelmann 4/21 (4 overs)		Jan Frylinck 45 (48); Mehran Khan 3/7 (3 overs)

Match tied (Namibia won the Super Over)
Kensington Oval, Bridgetown
Umpires: Jayaraman Madanagopal (Ind) and Joel Wilson (WI)
Player of the match: David Wiese (Nam)

- Namibia won the toss and elected to field.
- Super Over: Namibia 21/0, Oman 10/1

6 June 2024
15:00 UTC−4
Scorecard

Namibia; 155/9 (20 overs)	v	Scotland; 157/5 (18.3 overs)
Gerhard Erasmus 52 (31); Brad Wheal 3/33 (4 overs)		Richie Berrington 47* (35); Gerhard Erasmus 2/29 (4 overs)

Scotland won by 5 wickets
Kensington Oval, Bridgetown
Umpires: Jayaraman Madanagopal (Ind) and Nitin Menon (Ind)
Player of the match: Michael Leask (Sco)

- Namibia won the toss and elected to bat.

11 June 2024
20:30 UTC−4 (N)
Scorecard

Namibia; 72 (17 overs)	v	Australia; 74/1 (5.4 overs)
Gerhard Erasmus 36 (43); Adam Zampa 4/12 (4 overs)		Travis Head 34* (17); David Wiese 1/15 (1 over)

Australia won by 9 wickets
Sir Vivian Richards Stadium, North Sound
Umpires: Nitin Menon (Ind) and Rashid Riaz (Pak)
Player of the match: Adam Zampa (Aus)

- Australia won the toss and elected to field.

15 June 2024
13:00 UTC−4
Scorecard

England; 122/5 (10 overs)	v	Namibia; 84/3 (10 overs)
Harry Brook 47* (20); Ruben Trumpelmann 2/31 (2 overs)		Michael van Lingen 33 (29); Jofra Archer 1/15 (2 overs)

England won by 41 runs (DLS method)
Sir Vivian Richards Stadium, North Sound
Umpires: Adrian Holdstock (SA) and Langton Rusere (Zim)
Player of the match: Harry Brook (Eng)

- Namibia won the toss and elected to field.
- The match was reduced to 10 overs per side due to rain.
- Namibia were set a revised target of 126 from 10 overs due to rain.

=== India & Sri Lanka 2026 ===
Squad and kit

- Bernard Scholtz
- Gerhard Erasmus (c)
- JJ Smit
- Jan Nicol Loftie-Eaton
- Malan Kruger
- Dylan Leicher
- Willem Myburgh
- Jack Brassell
- Louren Steenkamp
- Ben Shikongo
- Zane Green (wk)
- Jan Frylinck
- Max Heingo
- Jan Balt
- Ruben Trumpelmann

Reserve players:

- Alexander Volschenk

2026 kit

Results

Group stage (Group A)					Super 8		Semifinal	Final	Overall Result
Opposition Result	Opposition Result	Opposition Result	Opposition Result	Rank	Opposition Result	Rank	Opposition Result	Opposition Result	Overall Result
Netherlands; Lost by 7 wickets	India; Lost by 93 runs	United States; Lost by 31 runs	Pakistan; Lost by 102 runs	5	Did not advance				Group stage
Source: Cricinfo

Scorecards

Group stage (Group A)

Match 10
10 February 2026
11:00 UTC+5:30
Scorecard

Namibia; 156/8 (20 overs)	v	Netherlands; 159/3 (18 overs)
Jan Nicol Loftie-Eaton 42 (38); Logan van Beek 2/13 (3 overs)		Bas de Leede 72* (48); Bernard Scholtz 1/27 (4 overs)

Netherlands won by 7 wickets
Arun Jaitley Cricket Stadium, New Delhi
Umpires: Adrian Holdstock (SA) and Langton Rusere (Zim)
Player of the match: Bas de Leede (Ned)

- Netherlands won the toss and elected to field.
- Willem Myburgh (Nam) made his T20I debut.
- This was Namibia's maiden international game in India.
- Ruben Trumpelmann (Nam) took his 50th wicket in T20Is.

Match 18
12 February 2026
19:00 UTC+5:30 (N)
Scorecard

India; 209/9 (20 overs)	v	Namibia; 116 (18.2 overs)
Ishan Kishan 61 (24); Gerhard Erasmus 4/20 (4 overs)		Louren Steenkamp 29 (20); Varun Chakravarthy 3/7 (2 overs)

India won by 93 runs
Arun Jaitley Cricket Stadium, New Delhi
Umpires: Paul Reiffel (Aus) and Rod Tucker (Aus)
Player of the match: Hardik Pandya (Ind)

- Namibia won the toss and elected to field.
- Ishan Kishan became the first Indian wicketkeeper to score half-century in the T20 World Cup.
- India's extended their record winning-streak in the T20 World Cup to ten consecutive wins.
- This was India's largest winning margin in a T20 World Cup match, surpassing their previous winning margin of 90 runs against England in 2012.

Match 26
15 February 2026
15:00 UTC+5:30 (D/N)
Scorecard

United States; 199/4 (20 overs)	v	Namibia; 168/6 (20 overs)
Sanjay Krishnamurthi 68* (33); Willem Myburgh 2/22 (4 overs)		Louren Steenkamp 58 (39); Shadley van Schalkwyk 2/30 (4 overs)

United States won by 31 runs
M. A. Chidambaram Stadium, Chennai
Umpires: K. N. Ananthapadmanabhan (Ind) and Sharfuddoula (Ban)
Player of the match: Sanjay Krishnamurthi (USA)

- United States won the toss and elected to bat.
- Monank Patel (USA) became the first player for the United States to score 1000 runs in T20Is.
- Zane Green (Nam) became the first player to be retired out in the 2026 tournament and second overall in the T20 World Cup history.
- Namibia were eliminated as a result of this match.

Match 35
18 February 2026
15:00 UTC+5:30 (D/N)
Scorecard

Pakistan; 199/3 (20 overs)	v	Namibia; 97 (17.3 overs)
Sahibzada Farhan 100* (58); Jack Brassell 2/48 (4 overs)		Louren Steenkamp 23 (22); Usman Tariq 4/16 (3.3 overs)

Pakistan won by 102 runs
Sinhalese Sports Club Cricket Ground, Colombo
Umpires: Chris Gaffaney (NZ) and Richard Illingworth (Eng)
Player of the match: Sahibzada Farhan (Pak)

- Pakistan won the toss and elected to bat.
- Sahibzada Farhan (Pak) scored his maiden century in T20Is. This was the third century in the 2026 tournament and 14th overall in the T20 World Cup history.
- This was Pakistan's largest winning margin in a T20 World Cup match, surpassing their previous winning margin of 82 runs against Netherlands in 2009.
- Pakistan qualified for the Super 8 while Netherlands and United States were eliminated as a result of this match.

== Records and statistics ==
=== Team records ===
Highest innings totals

Score	Opponent	Venue	Season
166/4 (19 overs)	Netherlands	Abu Dhabi	2021
163/7 (20 overs)	Sri Lanka	Geelong	2022
155/9 (20 overs)	Scotland	Bridgetown	2024
144/5 (20 overs)	Pakistan	Abu Dhabi	2021
141/8 (20 overs)	United Arab Emirates	Geelong	2022
Last updated: 15 June 2024

=== Most appearances ===
This list consists players with most number of matches at the T20 World Cup. Gerhard Erasmus has played a total of 15 matches, and has captained the team in all of their World Cup matches.

Matches	Player	Period
15	Gerhard Erasmus	2021-2024
15	Zane Green	2021-2024
15	JJ Smit	2021-2024
15	David Wiese	2021-2024
14	Jan Frylinck	2021-2024
14	Bernard Scholtz	2021-2024
13	Michael van Lingen	2021-2024
13	Ruben Trumpelmann	2021-2024
Last updated: 15 June 2024

=== Batting statistics ===
Most runs

Runs	Player	Mat	Inn	HS	Avg	100s	50s	Period
344	David Wiese	15	15	66*	34.40	—N/a	2	2021–2024
305	Gerhard Erasmus	15	15	53*	23.46	—N/a	2	2021–2024
184	Jan Frylinck	14	10	45	20.44	—N/a	—N/a	2021–2024
148	Michael van Lingen	13	11	33	13.45	—N/a	—N/a	2021–2024
146	Stephan Baard	8	8	29	18.25	—N/a	—N/a	2021–2022
Last updated: 15 June 2024

Highest partnerships

Runs	Players	Opposition	Venue	Season
93 (4th wicket)	David Wiese (63) & Gerhard Erasmus (30)	v Netherlands	Abu Dhabi	2021
70 (7th wicket)	JJ Smit (31) & Jan Frylinck (31)	v Sri Lanka	Geelong	2022
70 (8th wicket)	David Wiese (41) & Ruben Trumpelmann (24)	v United Arab Emirates	Geelong	2022
53* (3rd wicket)	David Wiese (28*) & Gerhard Erasmus (23*)	v Ireland	Sharjah	2021
51 (3rd wicket)	Gerhard Erasmus (37) & Zane Green (13)	v Scotland	Bridgetown	2024
Last updated: 15 June 2024

=== Bowling statistics ===
Most wickets

Wickets	Player	Matches	Avg.	Econ.	BBI	4W	5W	Period
14	David Wiese	15	25.14	7.23	3/28	0	0	2021–2024
13	Ruben Trumpelmann	13	26.46	7.81	4/21	1	0	2021–2024
12	Jan Frylinck	14	20.00	7.16	3/21	0	0	2021–2024
10	Bernard Scholtz	14	24.70	6.33	2/18	0	0	2021–2024
7	JJ Smit	15	39.57	7.91	2/24	0	0	2021–2024
Last updated: 15 June 2024

== See also ==
- Namibia at the Cricket World Cup
- ICC Men's T20 World Cup
