= Ugandan cricket team in Namibia in 2021–22 =

International cricket tour

	Namibia	Uganda
- Dates: 8 – 13 April 2022
Captains	Gerhard Erasmus	Brian Masaba

Twenty20 International series
- Results: Namibia won the 3-match series 2–1
Most runs	Gerhard Erasmus (131)	Dinesh Nakrani (129)
Most wickets	JJ Smit (8)	Riazat Ali Shah (2); Dinesh Nakrani (2)

The Uganda cricket team toured Namibia in April 2022 to play three Twenty20 International (T20I) matches and two 50-over matches. The venue for all of the matches was the United Ground in Windhoek. The tour was a repeat of Uganda's visit in April 2021, when Namibia swept both the T20I series and the 50-over series. Ahead of the matches against Uganda, the Namibians hosted the Ireland Wolves for a three-match Twenty20 series (winning 2–1) and a five-match List A 50-over series (drawn 2–2).

Namibia won the first T20I by 8 wickets. In the second game, Namibian captain Gerhard Erasmus scored an unbeaten century and dismissed both Ugandan opening batters, but an unbeaten partnership of 118 runs between Dinesh Nakrani and Riazat Ali Shah lead Uganda to a seven-wicket victory. Namibia won the third T20I match by 52 runs, following an all-round performance from JJ Smit, to take the series 2–1. Smit scored a half-century, then took a five-wicket haul which included a hat-trick.

Namibia cruised to victory in the first 50-over game after dismissing the visitors for only 68 runs. However, Uganda levelled the series with a thrilling run-chase in the second game.

== Squads ==
Namibia	Uganda
Gerhard Erasmus (c); Stephan Baard; Jan Frylinck; Jean-Pierre Kotze (wk); Jan Nicol Loftie-Eaton; Dylan Leicher; Lo-handre Louwrens (wk); Tangeni Lungameni; Mauritius Ngupita; Bernard Scholtz; Ben Shikongo; JJ Smit; Ruben Trumpelmann; Craig Williams	Brian Masaba (c); Deusdedit Muhumuza (vc); Fred Achelam (wk); Richard Agamiire; Frank Akankwasa; Emmanuel Hasahya; Cosmas Kyewuta; Juma Miyagi; Dinesh Nakrani; Frank Nsubuga; Arnold Otwani (wk); Henry Ssenyondo; Simon Ssesazi; Riazat Ali Shah; Kenneth Waiswa

Karl Birkenstock, Salomon Nuuyoma and Louis Peters also featured for Namibia in the 50-over series.

== T20I series ==
=== 1st T20I ===
8 April 2022
13:00
Scorecard

Uganda; 127/5 (20 overs)	v	Namibia; 128/2 (18.4 overs)
Simon Ssesazi 54 (54); JJ Smit 2/14 (4 overs)		Stephan Baard 52* (47); Frank Akankwasa 1/22 (4 overs)

Namibia won by 8 wickets
United Ground, Windhoek
Umpires: Andrew Louw (Nam) and Jeff Luck (Nam)
Player of the match: Stephan Baard (Nam)

- Namibia won the toss and elected to field.
- Dylan Leicher (Nam) made his T20I debut.

=== 2nd T20I ===
9 April 2022
10:00
Scorecard

Namibia; 177/4 (20 overs)	v	Uganda; 178/3 (19.5 overs)
Gerhard Erasmus 100* (47); Riazat Ali Shah 2/24 (4 overs)		Dinesh Nakrani 77* (39); Gerhard Erasmus 2/28 (4 overs)

Uganda won by 7 wickets
United Ground, Windhoek
Umpires: Andrew Louw (Nam) and Claus Schumacher (Nam)
Player of the match: Dinesh Nakrani (Uga)

- Uganda won the toss and elected to field.
- Gerhard Erasmus (Nam) scored his first century in T20Is.

=== 3rd T20I ===
10 April 2022
12:00
Scorecard

Namibia; 185/7 (20 overs)	v	Uganda; 133 (19.2 overs)
JJ Smit 71 (35); Cosmas Kyewuta 1/18 (4 overs)		Simon Ssesazi 58 (47); JJ Smit 6/10 (4 overs)

Namibia won by 52 runs
United Ground, Windhoek
Umpires: Jeff Luck (Nam) and Claus Schumacher (Nam)
Player of the match: JJ Smit (Nam)

- Uganda won the toss and elected to field.
- Juma Miyagi (Uga) made his T20I debut.
- JJ Smit became the first bowler for Namibia to take a hat-trick in T20Is, and took his first five-wicket haul in T20Is.

== 50-over series ==
=== 1st 50-over match ===
12 April 2022
09:30
Scorecard

Uganda; 68 (23.5 overs)	v	Namibia; 71/3 (16.5 overs)
Simon Ssesazi 24 (22); Dylan Leicher 3/6 (5 overs)		Craig Williams 36* (51); Richard Agamiire 1/8 (3 overs)

Namibia won by 7 wickets
United Ground, Windhoek
Umpires: Ewoud Lassen (Nam) and Andrew Louw (Nam)
Player of the match: Dylan Leicher (Nam)

- Namibia won the toss and elected to field.

=== 2nd 50-over match ===
13 April 2022
09:30
Scorecard

Namibia; 266/6 (50 overs)	v	Uganda; 269/7 (49.3 overs)
Craig Williams 90 (107); Cosmas Kyewuta 1/48 (10 overs); Henry Ssenyondo 1/48 (10 overs)		Simon Ssesazi 82 (86); Jan Frylinck 2/51 (7.3 overs)

Uganda won by 3 wickets
United Ground, Windhoek
Umpires: Esau Heynes (Nam) and Jeff Luck (Nam)
Player of the match: Simon Ssesazi (Uga)

- Uganda won the toss and elected to field.
