= Ugandan cricket team in Namibia in 2023 =

International cricket tour

	Namibia	Uganda
- Dates: 5 – 13 July 2023
Captains	Gerhard Erasmus	Brian Masaba

Twenty20 International series
- Results: Namibia won the 4-match series 4–0

The Uganda men's cricket team toured Namibia in July 2023 to play four Twenty20 matches and two 50-over matches. All matches were played at the United Ground in Windhoek. This was the third consecutive year in which Uganda had toured Namibia, following similar bilateral series in April 2021 and April 2022. The series provided both sides with an opportunity to continue their preparations for the T20 World Cup Africa Qualifier in November 2023.

Ahead of the series, Namibia hosted a series of five 50-over matches against the Indian first-class state team Karnataka in June 2023, which the visitors won 3–2. Meanwhile, Uganda travelled to Windhoek, having recently won the inaugural Continent Cup T20 Africa in Nairobi.

== Squads ==
Namibia	Uganda
Gerhard Erasmus (c); Jack Brassell; Niko Davin; Michiel du Preez; Shaun Fouché; Jan Frylinck; Zane Green (wk); Gerhard Janse van Rensburg (wk); Malan Kruger (wk); Lo-handre Louwrens (wk); Bernard Scholtz; Ben Shikongo; JJ Smit; Ruben Trumpelmann; Michael van Lingen; Pikky Ya France	Brian Masaba (c); Fred Achelam (wk); Joseph Baguma; Bilal Hassan; Cyrus Kakuru (wk); Ronald Lutaaya; Juma Miyagi; Pascal Murungi; Dinesh Nakrani; Frank Nsubuga; Robinson Obuya; Pius Oloka; Alpesh Ramjani; ~~Riazat Ali Shah~~; Henry Ssenyondo; Simon Ssesazi; Charles Waiswa; Kenneth Waiswa

Riazat Ali Shah missed the tour due to losing his passport. Henry Ssenyondo and Simon Ssesazi returned home after the first match of the series following the death of their mother, and they were replaced in Uganda's squad by Fred Achelam and Pius Oloka. Juma Miyagi also left the tour after the first match due to injury, and was replaced by Joseph Baguma. Due to a shortage of players, Uganda added team manager and former player Charles Waiswa to their squad ahead of the second T20 match.

== T20 series ==
=== 1st T20 ===
5 July 2023
13:00
Scorecard

Namibia; 191/6 (20 overs)	v	Uganda; 165/4 (20 overs)
Michael van Lingen 68 (40); Alpesh Ramjani 3/32 (4 overs)		Alpesh Ramjani 55 (34); Jan Frylinck 1/22 (3 overs)

Namibia won by 26 runs
United Ground, Windhoek
Umpires: Esau Heynes (Nam) and Andrew Louw (Nam)
Player of the match: Michael van Lingen (Nam)

- Uganda won the toss and elected to field.

=== 2nd T20 ===
6 July 2023
13:00
Scorecard

Namibia; 196/4 (20 overs)	v	Uganda; 123 (19.1 overs)
Niko Davin 57 (43); Alpesh Ramjani 2/22 (4 overs)		Kenneth Waiswa 26 (21); Gerhard Erasmus 4/8 (2.1 overs)

Namibia won by 73 runs
United Ground, Windhoek
Umpires: Esau Heynes (Nam) and Andrew Louw (Nam)
Player of the match: Gerhard Erasmus (Nam)

- Uganda won the toss and elected to field.

=== 3rd T20 ===
8 July 2023
13:00
Scorecard

Uganda; 203/6 (20 overs)	v	Namibia; 204/5 (19.5 overs)
Dinesh Nakrani 110 (45); Ruben Trumpelmann 3/53 (4 overs)		Jan Frylinck 93* (48); Dinesh Nakrani 3/26 (4 overs)

Namibia won by 5 wickets
United Ground, Windhoek
Umpires: Esau Heynes (Nam) and Claus Schumacher (Nam)
Player of the match: Dinesh Nakrani (Uga)

- Uganda won the toss and elected to bat.

=== 4th T20 ===
9 July 2023
13:00
Scorecard

Namibia; 186/7 (20 overs)	v	Uganda; 175/6 (20 overs)
Gerhard Erasmus 67 (38); Kenneth Waiswa 3/18 (3 overs)		Robinson Obuya 71 (37); Ben Shikongo 2/31 (4 overs)

Namibia won by 11 runs
United Ground, Windhoek
Umpires: Andrew Louw (Nam) and Claus Schumacher (Nam)
Player of the match: Gerhard Erasmus (Nam)

- Namibia won the toss and elected to bat.

== 50-over series ==
=== 1st 50-over match ===
11 July 2023
09:30
Scorecard

Uganda; 127 (37.1 overs)	v	Namibia; 128/0 (25.2 overs)
Kenneth Waiswa 42 (68); Pikky Ya France 6/22 (8.1 overs)		Lo-handre Louwrens 76* (89)

Namibia won by 10 wickets
United Ground, Windhoek
Player of the match: Pikky Ya France (Nam)

- Namibia won the toss and elected to field.

=== 2nd 50-over match ===
13 July 2023
09:30
Scorecard

Uganda; 108 (36.5 overs)	v	Namibia; 109/1 (23.2 overs)
Dinesh Nakrani 33 (70); Bernard Scholtz 4/14 (6.5 overs)		Shaun Fouché 45* (67); Pius Oloka 1/23 (6 overs)

Namibia won by 9 wickets
United Ground, Windhoek
Umpires: Esau Heynes (Nam) and Claus Schumacher (Nam)
Player of the match: Bernard Scholtz (Nam)

- Namibia won the toss and elected to field.
