= Namibian cricket team in Zimbabwe in 2025–26 =

International cricket tour

	Zimbabwe	Namibia
- Dates: 15 – 18 September 2025
Captains	Sikandar Raza	Gerhard Erasmus

Twenty20 International series
- Results: Zimbabwe won the 3-match series 2–1
Most runs	Brian Bennett (136)	Jan Frylinck (120)
Most wickets	Sikandar Raza (6)	JJ Smit (6)
- Player of the series: Brian Bennett (Zim)

The Namibia cricket team toured Zimbabwe in September 2025 to play the Zimbabwe cricket team. The tour consisted of three Twenty20 International (T20I) matches. The series formed part of both teams' preparations for the 2025 Men's T20 World Cup Africa Regional Final. In September 2025, the Zimbabwe Cricket (ZC) confirmed the fixtures for the tour. All the matches were played at the Queens Sports Club in Bulawayo.

== Squads ==
Zimbabwe	Namibia
Sikandar Raza (c); Brian Bennett; Ryan Burl; Brad Evans; Trevor Gwandu; Tinotenda Maposa; Tadiwanashe Marumani (wk); Wellington Masakadza; Tony Munyonga; Tashinga Musekiwa; Blessing Muzarabani; Dion Myers; Richard Ngarava; Brendan Taylor (wk); Sean Williams	Gerhard Erasmus (c); Jan Balt; Jack Brassell; Jan-Izak de Villiers; Jan Frylinck; Zane Green (wk); Malan Kruger; Dylan Leicher; Jan Nicol Loftie-Eaton; Bernard Scholtz; Ben Shikongo; JJ Smit; Louren Steenkamp; Ruben Trumpelmann; Alexander Busing-Volschenk

== T20I series ==
=== 1st T20I ===
15 September 2025
09:30
Scorecard

Zimbabwe; 211/3 (20 overs)	v	Namibia; 178/7 (20 overs)
Brian Bennett 94 (51); Alexander Busing-Volschenk 2/43 (4 overs)		Jan Nicol Loftie-Eaton 38 (24); Sikandar Raza 2/31 (4 overs)

Zimbabwe won by 33 runs
Queens Sports Club, Bulawayo
Umpires: Iknow Chabi (Zim) and Forster Mutizwa (Zim)
Player of the match: Brian Bennett (Zim)

- Namibia won the toss and elected to field.
- Brian Bennett (Zim) scored his 1,000th run in T20Is.

=== 2nd T20I ===
16 September 2025
13:30
Scorecard

Namibia; 169/6 (20 overs)	v	Zimbabwe; 170/5 (18.1 overs)
Jan Nicol Loftie-Eaton 47 (30); Richard Ngarava 2/25 (4 overs)		Tadiwanashe Marumani 50 (36); JJ Smit 2/38 (4 overs)

Zimbabwe won by 5 wickets
Queens Sports Club, Bulawayo
Umpires: Iknow Chabi (Zim) and Langton Rusere (Zim)
Player of the match: Tadiwanashe Marumani (Zim)

- Zimbabwe won the toss and elected to field.

=== 3rd T20I ===
18 September 2025
13:30
Scorecard

Namibia; 204/7 (20 overs)	v	Zimbabwe; 176 (19.5 overs)
Jan Frylinck 77 (31); Sikandar Raza 3/25 (4 overs)		Sean Williams 77 (45); JJ Smit 4/29 (4 overs)

Namibia won by 28 runs
Queens Sports Club, Bulawayo
Umpires: Forster Mutizwa (Zim) and Langton Rusere (Zim)
Player of the match: Jan Frylinck (Nam)

- Namibia won the toss and elected to bat.
- Louren Steenkamp (Nam) made his T20I debut.
- Ryan Burl (Zim) played in his 100th T20I match.
- Jan Frylinck (Nam) recorded the fastest half-century (13 balls) for Namibia.
