= 2021 Namibia Tri-Nation Series =

Cricket tournament

- Part of 2019–2023 ICC Cricket World Cup League 2
- Date: 26 November–6 December 2021
- Location: Namibia
Teams
Namibia	Oman	United Arab Emirates
Captains
JJ Smit	Zeeshan Maqsood	Ahmed Raza
Most runs
JJ Smit (150)	Ayaan Khan (92)	n/a
Most wickets
JJ Smit (7) Ruben Trumpelmann (7)	Zeeshan Maqsood (6)	n/a

The 2021 Namibia Tri-Nation Series was the 8th round of the 2019–2023 ICC Cricket World Cup League 2 cricket tournament that took place in Namibia in November and December 2021. It was a tri-nation series between Namibia, Oman and the United Arab Emirates cricket teams, with the matches played as One Day International (ODI) fixtures. The ICC Cricket World Cup League 2 formed part of the qualification pathway to the 2023 Cricket World Cup. Two matches that were postponed during the 4th round in January 2020 were added to the schedule of this series. JJ Smit was named as Namibia's captain for the series, after regular captain Gerhard Erasmus was ruled out after breaking a finger during the 2021 ICC Men's T20 World Cup.

Namibia and Oman played each other in the opening two fixtures, with each team winning one match. However, just prior to the start of the series, a new variant of the COVID-19 virus was discovered in southern Africa, resulting in the remaining fixtures being called off.

== Squads ==
Namibia	Oman	United Arab Emirates
JJ Smit (c); Stephan Baard; Karl Birkenstock; Jan Frylinck; Zane Green (wk); Jan Nicol Loftie-Eaton; Mauritius Ngupita; Michiel du Preez (wk); Bernard Scholtz; Ben Shikongo; Ruben Trumpelmann; Michael van Lingen; Craig Williams; Pikky Ya France	Zeeshan Maqsood (c); Khawar Ali; Fayyaz Butt; Nestor Dhamba; Sandeep Goud; Aqib Ilyas; Kaleemullah; Ayaan Khan; Bilal Khan; Naseem Khushi; Suraj Kumar; Mohammad Nadeem; Kashyap Prajapati; Jatinder Singh	Ahmed Raza (c); Vriitya Aravind; Mohammad Boota; Kashif Daud; Basil Hameed; Zahoor Khan; Karthik Meiyappan; Rohan Mustafa; Akif Raja; Chundangapoyil Rizwan; Junaid Siddique; Chirag Suri; Muhammad Usman; Muhammad Waseem

Tangeni Lungameni and Shaun Fouché were also named as reserves in Namibia's squad.

== Fixtures ==
=== 1st ODI ===
26 November 2021
09:30
Scorecard

Namibia; 228 (50 overs)	v	Oman; 188 (46.5 overs)
JJ Smit 56 (60); Zeeshan Maqsood 3/30 (10 overs)		Zeeshan Maqsood 58 (90); JJ Smit 5/26 (9 overs)

Namibia won by 40 runs
Wanderers Cricket Ground, Windhoek
Umpires: Shaun George (SA) and Andrew Louw (Nam)
Player of the match: JJ Smit (Nam)

- Oman won the toss and elected to field.
- Michiel du Preez, Ruben Trumpelmann and Michael van Lingen (Nam) all made their ODI debuts.

=== 2nd ODI ===
27 November 2021
09:30
Scorecard

Oman; 291/9 (50 overs)	v	Namibia; 282/9 (50 overs)
Ayaan Khan 83 (93); Ruben Trumpelmann 5/76 (10 overs)		JJ Smit 94 (72); Zeeshan Maqsood 3/45 (8 overs)

Oman won by 9 runs
Wanderers Cricket Ground, Windhoek
Umpires: Shaun George (SA) and Claus Schumacher (Nam)
Player of the match: Ayaan Khan (Oma)

- Oman won the toss and elected to bat.
- Jan Nicol Loftie-Eaton (Nam) made his ODI debut.

=== 3rd ODI ===
29 November 2021
09:30
Scorecard

Oman	v	United Arab Emirates

Wanderers Cricket Ground, Windhoek

=== 4th ODI ===
30 November 2021
09:30
Scorecard

Namibia	v	United Arab Emirates

Wanderers Cricket Ground, Windhoek

=== 5th ODI ===
2 December 2021
09:30
Scorecard

Oman	v	United Arab Emirates

Wanderers Cricket Ground, Windhoek

=== 6th ODI ===
4 December 2021
09:30
Scorecard

Namibia	v	Oman

Wanderers Cricket Ground, Windhoek

=== 7th ODI ===
5 December 2021
09:30
Scorecard

Namibia	v	United Arab Emirates

Wanderers Cricket Ground, Windhoek

=== 8th ODI ===
6 December 2021
09:30
Scorecard

Oman	v	United Arab Emirates

Wanderers Cricket Ground, Windhoek
