= 2023 Nepal Tri-Nation Series (February) =

Cricket tournament

2022 Nepal Tri-Nation Series
- Part of 2019–2023 ICC Cricket World Cup League 2
- Date: 14–21 February 2023
- Location: Nepal
Teams
| Namibia | Nepal | Scotland |
Captains
| Gerhard Erasmus | Rohit Paudel | Richie Berrington |
Most runs
| Michael van Lingen (159) Zane Green (159) | Rohit Paudel (212) | George Munsey (163) |
Most wickets
| Ruben Trumpelmann (11) | Sandeep Lamichhane (13) | Mark Watt (13) |

The 2023 Nepal Tri-Nation Series was the 19th round of the 2019–2023 ICC Cricket World Cup League 2 cricket tournament took place in Nepal in February 2023. It was a tri-nation series between the men's national cricket teams of Namibia, Nepal and the Scotland, with the matches being played as One Day International (ODI) fixtures. The ICC Cricket World Cup League 2 formed part of the qualification pathway to the 2023 Cricket World Cup.

Scotland's 10-wicket win against Namibia in the 2nd ODI of the series confirmed them as the winners of the 2019–23 League 2 tournament and they were presented with the trophy as the end of this series.

== Squads ==
| Namibia | Nepal | Scotland |
|---|---|---|
| Gerhard Erasmus (c); Karl Birkenstock; Shaun Fouché; Jan Frylinck; Zane Green (wk); Joshuan Julius; Jan Nicol Loftie-Eaton; Lo-handre Louwrens (wk); Tangeni Lungameni; Bernard Scholtz; Ben Shikongo; Ruben Trumpelmann; Michael van Lingen; Pikky Ya France | Rohit Paudel (c); Dipendra Singh Airee; Kushal Bhurtel; Gulshan Jha; Sundeep Jora; Sompal Kami; Karan KC; Sandeep Lamichhane; Gyanendra Malla; Kushal Malla; Lalit Rajbanshi; Bhim Sharki; Aasif Sheikh (wk); Surya Tamang | Richie Berrington (c); Matthew Cross (vc, wk); Kyle Coetzer; Chris Greaves; Jack Jarvis; Michael Leask; Tomas Mackintosh (wk); Christopher McBride; Brandon McMullen; George Munsey; Liam Naylor; Safyaan Sharif; Chris Sole; Hamza Tahir; Mark Watt |

== Fixtures ==
=== 1st ODI ===
14 February 2023
09:00
Scorecard

| Namibia; 285 (50 overs) | v | Nepal; 287/8 (47.4 overs) |
| Michael van Lingen 133 (137); Karan KC 5/61 (10 overs) | | Kushal Bhurtel 115 (113); Ruben Trumpelmann 3/48 (10 overs) |

Nepal won by 2 wickets
Tribhuvan University International Cricket Ground, Kirtipur
Umpires: Buddhi Pradhan (Nep) and Rashid Riaz (Pak)
Player of the match: Kushal Bhurtel (Nep)

- Nepal won the toss and elected to field.
- Kushal Bhurtel (Nep) scored his maiden century in ODIs.

=== 2nd ODI ===
15 February 2023
09:00
Scorecard

| Namibia; 153 (39.2 overs) | v | Scotland; 157/0 (22.1 overs) |
| Lo-handre Louwrens 54 (88); Michael Leask 4/24 (8.2 overs) | | George Munsey 103* (61) |

Scotland won by 10 wickets
Tribhuvan University International Cricket Ground, Kirtipur
Umpires: Buddhi Pradhan (Nep) and Durga Subedi (Nep)
Player of the match: George Munsey (Sco)

- Scotland won the toss and elected to field.
- George Munsey (Sco) scored his maiden century in ODIs.
- This result confirmed Scotland as winners of the 2019–2023 ICC Cricket World Cup League 2.

=== 3rd ODI ===
17 February 2023
09:00
Scorecard

| Scotland; 274/9 (50 overs) | v | Nepal; 275/7 (47 overs) |
| Michael Leask 107* (85); Sandeep Lamichhane 3/27 (10 overs) | | Dipendra Singh Airee 85* (116); Mark Watt 3/43 (10 overs) |

Nepal won by 3 wickets
Tribhuvan University International Cricket Ground, Kirtipur
Umpires: Rashid Riaz (Pak) and Durga Subedi (Nep)
Player of the match: Dipendra Singh Airee (Nep)

- Nepal won the toss and elected to field.
- Jack Jarvis and Tom Mackintosh (Sco) both made their ODI debuts.
- Michael Leask (Sco) scored his maiden century in ODIs.

=== 4th ODI ===
18 February 2023
09:00
Scorecard

| Namibia; 274/6 (50 overs) | v | Nepal; 278/7 (47.3 overs) |
| Zane Green 75* (63); Sandeep Lamichhane 3/46 (10 overs) | | Aasif Sheikh 81 (98); Ruben Trumpelmann 3/71 (10 overs) |

Nepal won by 3 wickets
Tribhuvan University International Cricket Ground, Kirtipur
Umpires: Buddhi Pradhan (Nep) and Rashid Riaz (Pak)
Player of the match: Aasif Sheikh (Nep)

- Nepal won the toss and elected to field.

=== 5th ODI ===
20 February 2023
09:00
Scorecard

| Scotland; 221 (48.4 overs) | v | Namibia; 178 (38.4 overs) |
| Christopher McBride 47 (75); Ruben Trumpelmann 5/30 (9.4 overs) | | Lo-handre Louwrens 52 (67); Mark Watt 4/41 (8.4 overs) |

Scotland won by 43 runs
Tribhuvan University International Cricket Ground, Kirtipur
Umpires: Buddhi Pradhan (Nep) and Durga Subedi (Nep)
Player of the match: Ruben Trumpelmann (Nam)

- Namibia won the toss and elected to field.
- Shaun Fouché (Nam) and Liam Naylor (Sco) both made their ODI debuts.

=== 6th ODI ===
21 February 2023
09:00
Scorecard

| Scotland; 212 (46.1 overs) | v | Nepal; 213/8 (44.1 overs) |
| George Munsey 60 (50); Sandeep Lamichhane 4/45 (10 overs) | | Rohit Paudel 95* (101); Mark Watt 3/29 (10 overs) |

Nepal won by 2 wickets
Tribhuvan University International Cricket Ground, Kirtipur
Umpires: Rashid Riaz (Pak) and Durga Subedi (Nep)
Player of the match: Rohit Paudel (Nep)

- Nepal won the toss and elected to field.
