= Ugandan cricket team in Namibia in 2020–21 =

International cricket tour

	Namibia	Uganda
- Dates: 3 – 8 April 2021
Captains	Gerhard Erasmus	Arnold Otwani

Twenty20 International series
- Results: Namibia won the 3-match series 3–0
Most runs	Craig Williams (95)	Ronak Patel (71)
Most wickets	Ben Shikongo (5); Jan Frylinck (5)	Kenneth Waiswa (3); Riazat Ali Shah (3)

The Uganda cricket team toured Namibia in April 2021 to play a three-match Twenty20 International (T20I) series and two 50-over matches. All of the matches were played at the Wanderers Cricket Ground in Windhoek.

Namibia won the first T20I match on 3 April by seven wickets, with captain Gerhard Erasmus leading the chase with 62 not out from just 36 balls. Two further victories for the hosts on 5 April, the first of which was rain affected, meant the hosts swept the T20I series 3–0.

Namibia won the first 50-over match thanks to some powerful hitting by JJ Smit (81 runs in 56 balls) and Michael Van Lingen (56 not out in 45 balls) in the second half of their innings, followed by a five-wicket haul (5/36) for Ruben Trumpelmann which included the first four wickets of the Ugandan chase that had left the visitors on just 9/4. Uganda recovered from a poor start to their run chase, led by a century for Ronak Patel, but were eventually all out 98 runs short of Namibia's total. Namibia comfortably won the second match by 162 runs after openers Stephan Baard and Divan la Cock put on a partnership of 150 runs, Baard top scoring with 145 in the host's total of 355/9.

== Squads ==
Namibia	Uganda
Gerhard Erasmus (c); Stephan Baard; Karl Birkenstock; Michiel du Preez; Shaun Fouché; Jan Frylinck; Jean-Pierre Kotze (wk); Divan la Cock; Jan Nicol Loftie-Eaton; Tangeni Lungameni; Dewald Nell; Mauritius Ngupita; Bernard Scholtz; Ben Shikongo; JJ Smit; Ruben Trumpelmann; Michael Van Lingen; Craig Williams	Arnold Otwani (c, wk); Frank Akankwasa; Trevor Bukenya; Saud Islam; Hamu Kayondo; Cosmas Kyewuta; Roger Mukasa; Dinesh Nakrani; Frank Nsubuga; Ronak Patel; Riazat Ali Shah; Jonathan Ssebanja; Henry Ssenyondo; Kenneth Waiswa

Ugandan captain Brian Masaba missed the tour due to injury, with Arnold Otwani chosen to lead the side in his absence.

== T20I series ==
=== 1st T20I ===
3 April 2021
14:30
Scorecard

Uganda; 134/5 (20 overs)	v	Namibia; 135/3 (14.5 overs)
Ronak Patel 35* (37); Ben Shikongo 2/24 (4 overs)		Gerhard Erasmus 62* (36); Dinesh Nakrani 1/22 (3 overs)

Namibia won by 7 wickets
Wanderers Cricket Ground, Windhoek
Umpires: Andrew Louw (Nam) and Claude Thorburn (Nam)
Player of the match: Gerhard Erasmus (Nam)

- Uganda won the toss and elected to bat.
- Michiel du Preez, Jan Nicol Loftie-Eaton (Nam), Cosmas Kyewuta and Ronak Patel (Uga) all made their T20I debuts.

=== 2nd T20I ===
5 April 2021
10:00
Scorecard

Namibia; 134/6 (20 overs)	v	Uganda; 65/5 (12.4 overs)
JJ Smit 40 (32); Riazat Ali Shah 3/23 (4 overs)		Kenneth Waiswa 33 (31); Ben Shikongo 2/8 (2 overs)

Namibia won by 20 runs (DLS method)
Wanderers Cricket Ground, Windhoek
Umpires: Marthinus Louw (Nam) and Claus Schumacher (Nam)
Player of the match: JJ Smit (Nam)

- Namibia won the toss and elected to bat.
- No further play was possible due to rain.
- Saud Islam and Jonathan Ssebanja (Uga) both made their T20I debuts.

=== 3rd T20I ===
5 April 2021
14:30
Scorecard

Namibia; 189/3 (20 overs)	v	Uganda; 124 (20 overs)
Craig Williams 81 (49); Kenneth Waiswa 2/41 (4 overs)		Riazat Ali Shah 33 (17); Jan Frylinck 3/21 (4 overs)

Namibia won by 65 runs
Wanderers Cricket Ground, Windhoek
Umpires: Andrew Louw (Nam) and Claus Schumacher (Nam)
Player of the match: Craig Williams (Nam)

- Namibia won the toss and elected to bat.

== 50-over series ==
=== 1st 50-over match ===
7 April 2021
10:00
Scorecard

Namibia; 301/7 (50 overs)	v	Uganda; 203/7 (50 overs)
JJ Smit 81 (56); Henry Ssenyondo 2/47 (10 overs)		Ronak Patel 105 (129); Ruben Trumpelmann 5/36 (10 overs)

Namibia won by 98 runs
Wanderers Cricket Ground, Windhoek
Umpires: Claus Schumacher (Nam) and Claude Thorburn (Nam)
Player of the match: Ruben Trumpelmann (Nam)

- Uganda won the toss and elected to field.

=== 2nd 50-over match ===
8 April 2021
10:00
Scorecard

Namibia; 354/9 (50 overs)	v	Uganda; 192 (44.4 overs)
Stephan Baard 145 (105); Riazat Ali Shah 2/49 (5 overs)		Roger Mukasa 43 (70); Ruben Trumpelmann 2/18 (7 overs)

Namibia won by 162 runs
Wanderers Cricket Ground, Windhoek
Umpires: Andrew Louw (Nam) and Marthinus Louw (Nam)
Player of the match: Stephan Baard (Nam)

- Namibia won the toss and elected to bat.
