= Mauritius Ngupita =

Namibian cricketer

Personal information
- Born: 13 December 2000 (age 25); Windhoek, Namibia
- Role: All-rounder

International information
- National side: Namibia
- Source: Cricinfo, 29 June 2022

Mauritius Ngupita (born 13 December 2000) is a Namibian cricketer. He made his first-class debut for Namibia in the 2017–18 Sunfoil 3-Day Cup on 8 February 2018. Prior to his first-class debut, he was named in Namibia's squad for the 2018 Under-19 Cricket World Cup.

In March 2019, he was named in Namibia's squad for the Africa Division 1 qualifier tournament for the 2020 Under-19 Cricket World Cup. In June 2019, he was among 25 cricketers to be named in Cricket Namibia's Elite Men's Squad ahead of the 2019–20 international season. In December 2019, he was one of three rookie players to be awarded a national contract with the Namibia cricket team. Later the same month, he was named in Namibia's One Day International (ODI) squad for the 2020 Oman Tri-Nation Series.

In March 2021, he was named in Namibia's Twenty20 International (T20I) squad for their series against Uganda. and in September 2021 as a reserve player in Namibia's squad for the 2021 ICC Men's T20 World Cup. In November 2021, he was included in Namibia's One Day International (ODI) squad for the 2021 Namibia Tri-Nation Series.

He made his Twenty20 debut on 21 March 2022, for Namibia A against the Ireland Wolves in Windhoek. Eight days later, he made his List A debut, also for Namibia A against the Ireland Wolves. Following the Namibia A tour matches, Ngupita was named in Namibia's Twenty20 International (T20I) squad for their series against Uganda.
