= Wanderers Cricket Ground =

Sports venue in Windhoek, Namibia

Coordinates: 22°35′29.63″S 17°04′18.32″E

- Interactive map of Wanderers Cricket Ground

Ground information
- Location: Windhoek, Namibia
- Country: Namibia
- Establishment: 1990; 36 years ago
- Owner: Government of Namibia
- Operator: Cricket Namibia
- Tenants: Namibia cricket team
- End names
- City End; River End

International information
- First men's ODI: 27 April 2019: Namibia v Oman
- Last men's ODI: 5 April 2023: Jersey v United Arab Emirates
- First men's T20I: 19 April 2013: Kenya v Netherlands
- Last men's T20I: 5 October 2024: Namibia v United States
- First women's T20I: 6 September 2024: Namibia v United Arab Emirates
- Last women's T20I: 14 September 2024: Namibia v Zimbabwe

Team information
| Namibia cricket team | (1989–) |
- As of 5 October 2024; Source: Cricinfo

Wanderers Cricket Ground is a cricket ground in Windhoek, Namibia. The first recorded match on the ground was in 1990 when Namibia played the Netherlands.

The ground held its first List A match in the 2001/02 6 Nations Challenge when Namibia played Sri Lanka A. In 2004, the ground held its first first-class match between Namibia and Uganda in the 2004 Intercontinental Cup. The first Twenty20 match was played on the ground in 2010, between Namibia and Bermuda, with the ground holding a further Twenty20 match between Namibia and Uganda later in 2010.

In April 2013, the ground hosted its first ever international T20 match between Kenya and the Netherlands.

== International records ==
=== One-Day International five-wicket hauls ===
The following table summarizes the five-wicket hauls taken in ODIs at this venue.

| # | Figures | Player | Country | Innings | Opponent | Date | Result |
|---|---|---|---|---|---|---|---|
| 1 | 5/13 | Jan Frylinck | Namibia | 2 | Oman | 27 April 2019 | Won |
| 2 | 5/26 | JJ Smit | Namibia | 2 | Oman | 26 November 2021 | Won |
| 3 | 5/76 | Ruben Trumpelmann | Namibia | 1 | Oman | 27 November 2021 | Lost |
| 4 | 6/42 | Tangeni Lungameni | Namibia | 1 | Papua New Guinea | 23 November 2022 | Won |
