= 2009–10 ICC Intercontinental Shield =

- Dates: 17 August 2009 – 5 December 2010
- Administrator: International Cricket Council
- Cricket format: First-class cricket
- Tournament format(s): Round-robin and Final
- Host(s): Various (home and away)
- Champions: Namibia (1st title)
- Participants: 4
- Matches: 7
- Most runs: (Namibia) Craig Williams (498)
- Most wickets: (Namibia) Louis Klazinga (23)

The ICC Intercontinental Shield 2009–2010, is the tier two of the ICC Intercontinental Cup. It was played by Bermuda, Namibia, Uganda and United Arab Emirates. The Shield started in August 2009 with the Bermuda vs Uganda match in Hamilton, Bermuda.

== Fixtures ==
=== Points table ===
Team	Points	P	W	L	D	FI	A
Namibia	46	3	2	1	0	3	0
United Arab Emirates	37	3	2	0	1	1	0
Uganda	29	3	1	1	1	2	0
Bermuda	0	3	0	3	0	0	0

- Win – 14 points
- Draw if more than 10 hours of play lost – 7 points (otherwise 3 points)
- First Innings leader – 6 points (independent of result)
- Abandoned without a ball played – 10 points.

=== Matches ===
==== 2009 season ====
17–20 August
Scorecard

Bermuda	v	Uganda
91 (43.5 overs); David Hemp 28 (81); Frank Nsubuga 4/20 [9.5]		119 (56.4 overs); Akbar Baig 34 (114); Rodney Trott 5/39 [21]
138 (71.5 overs); David Hemp 38 (109); Davis Arinaitwe 4/33 [24]		111/3 (49.5 overs); Lawrence Sematimba 39 (70); Malachi Jones 1/25 [11]

Uganda won by 7 wickets
Bermuda National Stadium, Hamilton, Bermuda
Umpires: Roger Dill & Steven Douglas

- Points: Uganda 20, Bermuda 0

==== 2009/10 season ====
5–8 December
Scorecard

Namibia	v	United Arab Emirates
369 (127 overs); Louis van der Westhuizen 70 (94); Fayyaz Ahmed 4/75 (29 overs)		297 (92.2 overs); Arfan Haider 84 (153); Louis Klazinga 5/61 (24.2 overs)
237 (91.1 overs); Raymond van Schoor 87 (204); Mohammad Tauqir 5/40 (13 overs)		311/6 (64.1 overs); Khurram Khan 109 (144); Louis Klazinga 2/95 (19 overs)

United Arab Emirates won by 4 wickets
Wanderers Cricket Ground, Windhoek, Namibia
Umpires: Jeff Luck (Zim) and Russell Tiffin (Zim)

- Points: United Arab Emirates 14, Namibia 6

20–23 January
Scorecard

United Arab Emirates	v	Uganda
361 (74 overs); Naeemuddin Aslam 152 (255); Frank Nsubuga 3/76 (28 overs)		373 (127.4 overs); Lawrence Sematimba 89 (127); Amjad Javed 4/48 (21.4 overs)
282/9d (87 overs); Arshad Ali 130 (200); Frank Nsubuga 3/100 (26 overs)		79/6 (43 overs); Ronald Ssemanda 22* (76); Qasim Zubair 3/16 (13 overs)

Match Drawn
Sheikh Zayed Stadium, Dubai, United Arab Emirates
Umpires: Sanjay Hazare (Ind) & Mohammad Ali (UAE)

- Points: Uganda 9, United Arab Emirates 3

==== 2010 season ====
3–6 April
Scorecard

Bermuda	v	Namibia
214 (84.5 overs); David Hemp 52 (86); Tobias Verwey 5/46 [19]		583/8d (114.5 overs); Ewaid Steenkamp 206 (282); Malachi Jones 3/141 [21]
184 (47.1 overs); David Hemp 65 (86); Louis Klazinga 5/45 [15]

Namibia won by an innings and 185 runs
Wanderers Cricket Ground, Windhoek, Namibia
Umpires: Johanes Cloete and Jeff Luck

- Points: Namibia 20, Bermuda 0.
  Namibia's openers van Schoor and Steenkamp put on a record-breaking 374 for the first wicket.

5–8 July
Scorecard

Bermuda	v	United Arab Emirates
56 (31.3 overs); Chris Foggo 29 (57); Shadeep Silva 3/4 [6]		356/6d (108 overs); Arshad Ali 126 (278); Joshua Gilbert 3/85 [23]
332 (127.3 overs); David Hemp 84 (169); Ahmed Raza 4/55 [35.3]		35/1 (8.3 overs); Arshad Ali 14* (30); Joshua Gilbert 0/12 [4]

United Arab Emirates won by 9 wickets
National Stadium, Hamilton, Bermuda
Umpires: Richard Austin and Roger Dill

- Points: United Arab Emirates 20, Bermuda 0.

==== 2010/11 season ====
18–21 September
Scorecard

Uganda	v	Namibia
329 (92.1 overs); Lawrence Sematimba 106 (136); Craig Williams 5/90 (21.1 overs)		609 (179.4 overs); Ewaid Steenkamp 87 (120); Charles Waiswa 3/123 (26.4 overs)
295 (54 overs); Roger Mukasa 121 (240); Louis Klazinga 3/42 (14 overs)		16/0 (4 overs); Ewaid Steenkamp 13* (12)

Namibia won by 10 wickets
Wanderers Cricket Ground, Windhoek, Namibia
Umpires: Wynand Louw (Nam) and Jeff Luck (Nam)

- Namibia won the toss and elected to field.

== Final ==
2–5 December
Scorecard

United Arab Emirates	v	Namibia
79 (25.3 overs); Naeemuddin Aslam 38 (58); Kola Burger 7/38 (12.3 overs)		320 (75.2 overs); Craig Williams 116 (102); Arshad Ali 3/46 (13.2 overs)
427 (173.1 overs); Saqib Ali 160* (436); Sarel Burger 5/80 (47 overs)		187/4 (39.1 overs); Craig Williams 113* (95); Amjad Javed 3/54 (12 overs)

Namibia won by 6 wickets
ICC Global Cricket Academy, Dubai, United Arab Emirates
Umpires: Gary Baxter (NZ) and Ian Ramage (Sco)
Player of the match: Craig Williams

- Namibia won the toss and elected to field.

== Stats ==
=== Runs ===
Player	Matches	Runs	Avg	HS
(Namibia) Craig Williams	4	498	124.50	116
(United Arab Emirates) Arshad Ali	4	451	64.42	130
(Namibia) Ewaid Steenkamp	3	407	101.75	206
(Namibia) Raymond van Schoor	3	317	52.83	157
(United Arab Emirates) Saqib Ali	4	302	50.33	160 *
(Uganda) Lawrence Sematimba	3	291	48.50	106

=== Wickets ===
Player	Matches	Wickets	Avg	BBI
(Namibia) Louis Klazinga	4	23	20.91	5/45
(United Arab Emirates) Amjad Javed	4	12	25.83	4/48
(Uganda) Frank Nsubuga	3	12	26.00	4/20
(Uganda) Davis Arinaitwe	3	11	18.00	4/34
(Namibia) Kola Burger	4	11	24.36	7/38
