= Michiel du Preez =

Namibian cricketer

Personal information
- Full name: Michiel Daniel du Preez
- Born: 3 January 1996 (age 30); South Africa, Cape Town
- Batting: Right-handed
- Bowling: Right-arm leg break
- Role: Batsman, wicket-keeper

International information
- National side: Namibia (2019–present)
- ODI debut (cap 30): 26 November 2021 v Oman
- Last ODI: 27 November 2021 v Oman
- T20I debut (cap 17): 3 April 2021 v Uganda
- Last T20I: 5 April 2021 v Uganda

Career statistics
Competition	FC	LA	T20
Matches	25	14	12
Runs scored	623	251	250
Batting average	13.54	17.92	41.66
100s/50s	0/4	0/1	0/2
Top score	62	51	72
Balls bowled	192	48	–
Wickets	1	0	–
Bowling average	143.00	–	–
5 wickets in innings	0	–	–
10 wickets in match	0	0	0
Best bowling	1/18	–	–
Catches/stumpings	19/1	7/0	2/0
- Source: ESPNcricinfo, 27 November 2021

Michiel du Preez (born 3 January 1996) is a Namibian cricketer. He selected as part of Namibia's squad for the 2015 ICC World Twenty20 Qualifier tournament replacing Zhivago Groenewald.

== Career ==
In August 2018, he was included in Namibia's squad for the 2018 Africa T20 Cup, and was the leading run-scorer for Namibia in the tournament, with 164 runs in four matches.

In October 2018, he was named in Namibia's squad in the Southern sub region group for the 2018–19 ICC World Twenty20 Africa Qualifier tournament in Botswana. In June 2019, he was one of twenty-five cricketers to be named in Cricket Namibia's Elite Men's Squad ahead of the 2019–20 international season.

In March 2021, he was named in Namibia's Twenty20 International (T20I) squad for their series against Uganda. He made his T20I debut on 3 April 2021, against Uganda. In September 2021, du Preez was named in Namibia's squad for the 2021 ICC Men's T20 World Cup. In November 2021, he was named in Namibia's One Day International (ODI) squad for the 2021 Namibia Tri-Nation Series. He made his ODI debut on 26 November 2021, for Namibia against Oman.
