= Shaun Fouché =

Namibian cricketer (born 2000)

Personal information
- Full name: Shaun Fouché
- Born: 14 February 2000 (age 26); Paarl, Western Cape, South Africa
- Batting: Right-handed
- Bowling: Right-arm medium
- Role: Batter

International information
- National side: Namibia (2022–present)
- ODI debut (cap 38): 20 February 2023 v Scotland
- Last ODI: 4 April 2023 v Canada
- T20I debut (cap 28): 3 March 2024 v Netherlands
- Last T20I: 17 March 2024 v Zimbabwe

Career statistics
| Competition | ODI | LA | T20 |
|---|---|---|---|
| Matches | 7 | 8 | 3 |
| Runs scored | 209 | 217 | 43 |
| Batting average | 29.85 | 27.12 | 21.50 |
| 100s/50s | 0/2 | 0/2 | 0/0 |
| Top score | 83 | 83 | 31 |
| Balls bowled | 156 | 156 | 6 |
| Wickets | 6 | 6 | 0 |
| Bowling average | 21.66 | 21.66 | – |
| 5 wickets in innings | 0 | 0 | – |
| 10 wickets in match | 0 | 0 | – |
| Best bowling | 3/46 | 3/46 | – |
| Catches/stumpings | 3/– | 3/– | 1/– |
- Source: ESPNcricinfo, 20 February 2024

Shaun Fouché (born 14 February 2000) is a Namibian cricketer, who is a right-handed batter. He finished his secondary education at Paarl Boys' High School. He played for the Namibia national under-19 cricket team at the 2018 Under-19 Cricket World Cup.

== Career ==
In March 2021, Fouché earned his maiden call up to the Namibia cricket team for their series against Uganda. He was selected to play for the Richelieu Eagles in the 2022 Namibia Global T20 League. In August 2022, he was sent to Lahore for a training camp at Lahore Qalandars High-Performance Center (HPC) ahead of the competition. He made his Twenty20 debut on 21 March 2022, for Namibia A against Ireland Wolves in Windhoek. He made his List A debut on 29 March 2022, for Namibia A against Ireland Wolves.

In February 2023, he was selected to play for Namibia in the 2023 Nepal Tri-Nation Series. He made his One Day International (ODI) debut on 20 February 2023, for Namibia against Scotland in that tournament. In March 2023, he was named in Namibia's squad for the 2023 Cricket World Cup Qualifier Play-off tournament. On 26 March 2023, he made his maiden half-century in ODI cricket, scoring 53 runs off 96 balls against the United States. On 4 April 2023, he claimed another half-century scoring 83 runs, and was named the player of the match.

In February 2024, he was named in Namibia's squad for the 2024 Nepal Tri-Nation Series. He made his Twenty20 International (T20I) debut on 3 March 2024, against the Netherlands at Kirtipur.
