= List of Namibia ODI cricketers =

Since their first match in 2003, 48 players have represented Namibia in One Day Internationals (ODIs). A One Day International is an international cricket match between two representative teams, each having ODI status, as determined by the International Cricket Council (ICC). An ODI differs from Test matches in that the number of overs per team is limited, and that each team has one innings.

Namibia are associate members of the International Cricket Council (ICC). Namibia played their first ODI matches during the 2003 Cricket World Cup after qualifying by reaching the final of the 2001 ICC Trophy. At the World Cup, Namibia played in six One Day internationals (the ICC granted ODI status to all matches played at this competition). Namibia were defeated in each of their six matches; their best result came in a 55 run loss to England. These were the only ODI matches played by Namibia until they gained ODI status after reaching the final of the 2019 ICC World Cricket League Division Two.

== Key ==
General

- ‡ – Captain
- † – Wicket-keeper
- First – Year of debut
- Last – Year of latest game
- Mat – Number of matches played

Batting

- Runs – Runs scored in career
- HS – Highest score
- Avg – Runs scored per dismissal
- * – Batsman remained not out
- 50 – Half-centuries scored
- 100 – Centuries scored

Bowling

- Balls – Balls bowled in career
- Wkt – Wickets taken in career
- BBI – Best bowling in an innings
- Ave – Average runs per wicket
- 5WI – Five wickets or more in a match

Fielding

- Ca – Catches taken
- St – Stumpings taken

== Players ==
Statistics are correct as of 1 November 2026.

Namibia ODI cricketers
General					Batting					Bowling					Fielding		Ref(s)
Cap	Name	First	Last	Mat	Runs	HS	Avg	50	100	Balls	Wkt	BBI	Ave	5WI	Ca	St	Ref(s)
1	Jan-Berrie Burger	2003	2003	6	199	85	33.16	1	0	96	3	1/18	34.66	0	0	0	
2	Louis Burger	2003	2003	6	11	5	2.20	0	0	330	6	3/39	49.50	0	6	0	
3	Morné Karg†	2003	2003	3	45	41	22.50	0	0	–	–	–	–	–	1	0	
4	Danie Keulder	2003	2003	6	132	52	22.00	1	0	–	–	–	–	–	3	0	
5	Björn Kotzé	2003	2003	5	27	24*	9.00	0	0	258	3	2/51	92.00	0	1	0	
6	Deon Kotzé‡	2003	2003	6	82	27	16.40	0	0	282	2	1/32	128.00	0	3	0	
7	Lennie Louw	2003	2003	1	–	–	–	–	–	60	1	1/60	60.00	0	1	0	
8	Bryan Murgatroyd	2003	2003	6	90	52	15.00	1	0	–	–	–	–	–	0	0	
9	Gerrie Snyman	2003	2003	5	5	5	1.25	0	0	288	6	3/69	46.83	0	0	0	
10	Stephan Swanepoel	2003	2003	5	43	23	8.60	0	0	–	–	–	–	–	0	0	
11	Riaan Walters	2003	2003	2	0	0	0.00	0	0	–	–	–	–	–	0	0	
12	Melt van Schoor†	2003	2003	5	58	24	14.50	0	0	–	–	–	–	–	4	0	
13	Rudie van Vuuren	2003	2003	5	26	14	8.66	0	0	300	8	5/43	37.25	1	0	0	
14	Sarel Burger	2003	2003	2	11	6	5.50	0	0	66	0	–	–	–	1	0	
15	Burton van Rooi	2003	2003	3	26	17	26.00	0	0	120	1	1/24	119.00	0	0	0	
16	Stephan Baard	2019	2022	19	348	73	18.31	2	0	–	–	–	–	–	5	0	
17	Karl Birkenstock	2019	2023	20	258	61	15.17	1	0	246	5	2/24	52.80	0	8	0	
18	Gerhard Erasmus‡	2019	2026	83	2,840	156*	39.44	22	3	2,125	62	5/28	27.17	2	47	0	
19	Jan Frylinck	2019	2026	68	1,607	126	29.21	10	3	1,388	37	5/13	27.94	1	22	0	
20	Zane Green†	2019	2026	71	1,279	75*	24.13	4	0	–	–	–	–	–	68	8	
21	Jean-Pierre Kotze†	2019	2025	26	584	136	23.36	1	1	–	–	–	–	–	3	0	
22	Bernard Scholtz	2019	2026	80	332	31*	11.85	0	0	4,156	115	5/22	21.15	2	8	0	
23	JJ Smit	2019	2026	70	1,216	94	23.38	3	0	2,567	82	6/27	22.21	3	23	0	
24	Christi Viljoen	2019	2019	2	19	17*	19.00	0	0	30	2	2/6	7.00	0	2	0	
25	Craig Williams	2019	2022	18	488	129*	30.50	1	1	288	3	1/37	74.66	0	6	0	
26	Pikky Ya France	2019	2023	25	263	52*	26.30	1	0	865	15	2/27	44.06	0	7	0	
27	Zhivago Groenewald	2019	2019	4	4	3	4.00	0	0	198	11	5/20	11.81	1	2	0	
28	Ben Shikongo	2020	2025	23	22	4	5.50	0	0	858	25	4/29	35.08	0	7	0	
29	Jan-Izak de Villiers	2020	2025	8	28	14*	4.66	0	0	138	2	2/47	77.00	0	0	0	
30	Michau du Preez	2021	2023	3	14	5	4.66	0	0	–	–	–	–	–	4	0	
31	Ruben Trumpelmann	2021	2026	68	728	55*	17.75	3	0	3,239	98	5/30	27.05	2	21	0	
32	Michael van Lingen	2021	2026	53	1,680	133	36.52	7	6	98	2	1/0	39.50	0	18	0	
33	Jan Nicol Loftie-Eaton†	2021	2026	64	1,240	73	25.83	7	0	1209	39	4/34	28.64	0	36	0	
34	Tangeni Lungameni	2022	2025	35	51	12*	5.66	0	0	1,632	52	6/42	23.73	1	12	0	
35	David Wiese (Note: David Wiese also played 6 One Day International matches for South Africa. Only his record for Namibia is given above.)	2022	2022	9	228	67	28.50	1	0	443	6	2/22	61.66	0	2	0	
36	Lo-handre Louwrens†	2022	2024	26	582	57	23.28	3	0	–	–	–	–	–	16	0	
37	Divan la Cock	2022	2022	16	313	59	20.86	1	0	12	0	–	–	–	8	0	
38	Shaun Fouché	2023	2025	12	261	83	23.72	2	0	318	13	3/37	21.23	0	3	0	
39	Niko Davin	2023	2025	13	255	90	19.61	1	0	–	–	–	–	–	7	0	
40	Jack Brassell	2024	2026	29	30	11	3.33	0	0	1327	41	4/22	29.17	0	12	0	
41	Malan Kruger	2024	2026	31	647	80	21.56	3	0	–	–	–	–	–	13	0	
42	Junior Kariata	2024	2024	1	–	–	–	–	–	30	1	1/31	31.00	0	0	0	
43	Peter-Daniel Blignaut	2024	2024	1	0	0	0.00	0	0	24	1	1/28	28.00	0	0	0	
44	Dylan Leicher	2024	2026	8	154	58	30.80	1	0	102	2	1/33	54.50	0	3	0	
45	Jan Balt	2025	2026	4	61	35*	20.33	0	0	84	2	2/70	46.50	0	1	0	
46	Willem Myburgh	2025	2026	6	79	43	15.80	0	0	54	2	1/12	22.50	0	1	0	
47	Max Heingo	2026	2026	7	20	20*	20.00	0	0	286	7	3/59	44.42	0	2	0	
48	Louren Steenkamp	2026	2026	20	648	102	36.00	4	1	–	–	–	–	–	10	0	
49	Alexander Busing-Volschenk	2026	2026	9	122	36	20.33	0	0	–	–	–	–	–	2	0	
50	Waldo Smith	2026	2026	3	20	20*	20.00	0	0	84	1	1/29	98.00	0	0	0	

== See also ==
- List of Namibia Twenty20 International cricketers
