= United Ground =

Sports venue in Windhoek, Namibia

Coordinates: 22°36′27.87″S 17°05′47.12″E

- Interactive map of United Ground

Ground information
- Location: Windhoek, Namibia
- Country: Namibia
- Establishment: 1990; 36 years ago
- Capacity: 39,000
- End names
- Northern End; Southern End

International information
- First ODI: 1 December 2022: Namibia v Scotland
- Last ODI: 26 September 2024: Namibia v United Arab Emirates
- First T20I: 19 August 2019: Namibia v Botswana
- Last T20I: 30 November 2023: Kenya v Zimbabwe
- First WT20I: 1 April 2019: Namibia v Botswana
- Last WT20I: 2 May 2023: Namibia v Uganda
- As of 26 September 2024; Source: Cricinfo

United Ground, also known as TrustCo United Sports Field, is a cricket ground in Windhoek, Namibia. The first recorded match on the ground was played in 1990 between Namibia and the Netherlands.

The ground hosted its first List A match in the 2001/02 6 Nations Challenge when Kenya played Zimbabwe A. To date the ground has held 12 List A matches. In 2005, the ground held its inaugural first-class match between Namibia and Bermuda in the 2005 Intercontinental Cup. The venue held a second first-class match in 2010 between Namibia and Uganda in the 2009-10 Intercontinental Shield.

== List of Centuries ==
=== Twenty20 International Centuries ===
This is the list of centuries scored in Twenty20 Internationals at the venue

No.	Score	Player	Team	Balls	Inns.	Opposing team	Date	Result
1	101*	JP Kotze	Namibia	43	1	Botswana	20 August 2019	Won
2	100*	Gerhard Erasmus	Namibia	47	1	Uganda	9 April 2022	Lost
