= Louren Steenkamp =

South African cricketer (born 1997)

Personal information
- Born: 8 May 1997 (age 29); Potchefstroom, North West, South Africa
- Batting: Right-handed
- Bowling: Right-arm off break

International information
- National side: Namibia
- Only ODI (cap 48): 4 April 2026 v Oman
- T20I debut (cap 34): 18 September 2025 v Zimbabwe
- Last T20I: 11 October 2025 v South Africa

Domestic team information
- Years: Team
- 2017/18–2021/22: North West
- 2022/23–present: Limpopo

Career statistics
Competition	T20I	FC	LA	T20
Matches	7	20	27	20
Runs scored	137	1,203	649	393
Batting average	19.57	32.51	25.96	21.83
100s/50s	0/1	2/8	0/5	0/1
Top score	51	136	99	51
Balls bowled	–	80	161	–
Wickets	–	1	6	–
Bowling average	–	60.00	22.16	–
5 wickets in innings	–	0	0	–
10 wickets in match	–	0	0	–
Best bowling	–	1/22	3/56	–
Catches/stumpings	3/–	11/–	12/–	9/–
- Source: Cricinfo, 4 April 2026

Louren Steenkamp (born 8 May 1997) is a South African-born Namibian cricketer, who bats right-handed.

== Career ==
Steenkamp made his first-class debut for North West in the 2017–18 Sunfoil 3-Day Cup on 23 November 2017. He made his List A debut for North West in the 2018–19 CSA Provincial One-Day Challenge on 21 October 2018.

In January 2026, Steenkamp was named in Namibia's squad for the 2026 T20 World Cup.
