= Jean-Pierre Kotze =

Namibian cricketer

Personal information
- Born: 23 April 1994 (age 32); Walvis Bay, Erongo Region, Namibia
- Batting: Left-handed
- Role: Wicket-keeper batter

International information
- National side: Namibia
- ODI debut (cap 21): 27 April 2019 v Oman
- Last ODI: 21 February 2024 v Nepal
- T20I debut (cap 15): 22 August 2019 v Botswana
- Last T20I: 5 April 2024 v Oman

Career statistics
Competition	ODI	T20I	FC	LA
Matches	8	15	39	70
Runs scored	299	286	1,416	1,520
Batting average	37.37	20.42	20.22	25.33
100s/50s	1/0	1/0	1/5	2/4
Top score	136	101*	102	148
Catches/stumpings	0/–	7/2	68/5	50/4
- Source: Cricinfo, 10 April 2022

Jean-Pierre Kotze (born 23 April 1994) is a Namibian cricketer. He is a left-handed wicket-keeper and batsman. Kotze was part of Namibia's squad for the 2018 ICC World Cricket League Division Two tournament and for the 2019 ICC World Cricket League Division Two tournament. Namibia finished in the top four places in the tournament, therefore gaining One Day International (ODI) status. Kotze made his ODI debut on 27 April 2019, against Oman, in the tournament's final.

In June 2019, he was one of twenty-five cricketers to be named in Cricket Namibia's Elite Men's Squad ahead of the 2019–20 international season. He made his Twenty20 International (T20I) debut for Namibia against Botswana on 20 August 2019 during Botswana's tour of Namibia. On debut, he finished on 101 not out, from 43 balls. He became the first batsman for Namibia to score a century in a T20I match.

In August, Kotze was named in Namibia's ODI squad for the 2019 United States Tri-Nation Series. On 20 September 2019, in the match against the United States, he scored 136 runs to become the first batsman for Namibia to score a century in ODI cricket. Later the same month, he was named in Namibia's squad for the 2019 ICC T20 World Cup Qualifier tournament in the United Arab Emirates. Ahead of the tournament, the International Cricket Council (ICC) named him as the key player in Namibia's squad.

In 2021, Kotze retired from cricket at the end of the home season in Namibia to spend more time with his family. However, in April 2022, he announced he was coming out of retirement. A few days later, he was named in Namibia's T20I squad for their series against Uganda.

In May 2024, he was named in Namibia's squad for the 2024 ICC Men's T20 World Cup tournament.
