= Jan Nicol Loftie-Eaton =

Namibian cricketer (born 2001)

Personal information
- Born: 15 March 2001 (age 25); Windhoek, Namibia
- Batting: Left-handed
- Bowling: Right-arm medium, leg break
- Role: Batter, Occasional Wicketkeeper

International information
- National side: Namibia
- ODI debut (cap 28): 8 December 2019 v UAE
- Last ODI: 4 September 2025 v Scotland
- ODI shirt no.: 30
- T20I debut (cap 18): 3 April 2021 v Uganda
- Last T20I: 11 October 2025 v South Africa
- T20I shirt no.: 18

Domestic team information
- Years: Team
- 2024: Chitwan Rhinos

Career statistics
Competition	ODI	T20I	FC	LA
Matches	51	51	1	56
Runs scored	1,113	656	8	1,268
Batting average	27.82	20.50	8.00	28.17
100s/50s	0/7	1/1	0/0	0/9
Top score	73	101	8	73
Balls bowled	813	398	–	831
Wickets	29	23	–	29
Bowling average	24.65	21.04	–	25.37
5 wickets in innings	0	0	–	0
10 wickets in match	0	0	–	0
Best bowling	4/34	4/10	–	4/34
Catches/stumpings	32/–	25/–	3/–	33/1
- Source: Cricinfo, 12 October 2025

Jan Nicol Loftie-Eaton (born 15 March 2001) is a Namibian cricketer, who bats left-handed and bowls right-arm medium pace.

== Career ==
Loftie Eaten made his first-class debut for Namibia in the 2017–18 Sunfoil 3-Day Cup on 8 February 2018. He was previously named in Namibia's squad for the 2018 Under-19 Cricket World Cup. He made his List A debut for Namibia in the 2017–18 CSA Provincial One-Day Challenge on 11 February 2018.

In August 2018, he was named in Namibia's squad for the 2018 Africa T20 Cup. He made his Twenty20 debut for Namibia in the 2018 Africa T20 Cup on 14 September 2018. In October 2018, he was named in Namibia's squad in the Southern sub region group for the 2018–19 ICC World Twenty20 Africa Qualifier tournament in Botswana.

In June 2019, he was among the 25 cricketers named in Cricket Namibia's Elite Men's Squad ahead of the 2019–20 international season. In December 2019, he was one of three rookie players to be awarded a national contract with the Namibia cricket team. Later the same month, he was named in Namibia's One Day International (ODI) squad for the 2020 Oman Tri-Nation Series.

In March 2021, he was named in Namibia's Twenty20 International (T20I) squad for their series against Uganda. He made his T20I debut on 3 April 2021, for Namibia against Uganda. In September 2021, he was named in Namibia's squad for the 2021 ICC Men's T20 World Cup. In November 2021, he was named in Namibia's One Day International (ODI) squad for the 2021 Namibia Tri-Nation Series. He made his ODI debut on 27 November 2021, for Namibia against Oman.

In January 2026, he was named in Namibia's squad for the 2026 T20 World Cup.

== Record ==
On 27 February 2024, Loftie-Eaten scored the fastest century in men's T20Is, in terms of number of deliveries faced (33), which was later beaten by Sahil Chauhan of Estonia.
