= Michael van Lingen =

Namibian cricketer

Personal information
- Born: 24 October 1997 (age 29); Swakopmund, Namibia
- Batting: Left-handed
- Bowling: Left-arm medium
- Role: Allrounder

International information
- National side: Namibia
- ODI debut (cap 32): 26 November 2021 v Oman
- Last ODI: 30 March 2023 v Jersey
- T20I debut (cap 20): 10 October 2021 v PNG
- Last T20I: 30 October 2023 v Zimbabwe
- Source: Cricinfo, 29 November 2022

Michael van Lingen (born 24 October 1997) is a Namibian cricketer. In January 2016, he was named in Namibia's squad for the 2016 Under-19 Cricket World Cup. He was one of the most successful bowlers at the tournament, and was also praised during Namibia's surprise victory over South Africa when he walked after being caught behind despite the umpire not giving him out. He made his first-class debut for Northerns on 3 March 2016 in the Sunfoil 3-Day Cup tournament.

In March 2021, he was named in Namibia's Twenty20 International (T20I) squad for the series against Uganda, and in September 2021 in Namibia's squad for the 2021 ICC Men's T20 World Cup. He was also included in Namibia's T20I squad for the 2021 Summer T20 Bash, played just before the World Cup. He made his T20I debut on 10 October 2021, for Namibia against Papua New Guinea.

In November 2021, he was named in Namibia's One Day International (ODI) squad for the 2021 Namibia Tri-Nation Series. He made his ODI debut on 26 November 2021, for Namibia against Oman.

In May 2024, he was named in Namibia's squad for the 2024 ICC Men's T20 World Cup tournament.
