= List of Namibia Twenty20 International cricketers =

This is a list of Namibian Twenty20 International cricketers. In April 2018, the ICC decided to grant full Twenty20 International (T20I) status to all its members. Therefore, all Twenty20 matches played between Namibia and other ICC members after 1 January 2019 will be eligible for T20I status.

This list comprises all members of the Namibia cricket team who have played at least one T20I match. It is initially arranged in the order in which each player won his first Twenty20 cap. Where more than one player won his first Twenty20 cap in the same match, those players are listed alphabetically by surname. Namibia played their first T20I match on 20 May 2019 against Ghana at the ICC T20 World Cup Africa Qualifier Finals.

== Key ==
General

- ‡ – Captain
- † – Wicket-keeper
- First – Year of debut
- Last – Year of latest game
- Mat – Number of matches played

Batting

- Runs – Runs scored in career
- HS – Highest score
- Avg – Runs scored per dismissal
- * – Batsman remained not out
- 100 – Centuries scored
- 50 – Number of half centuries

Bowling

- Balls – Balls bowled in career
- Wkt – Wickets taken in career
- BBI – Best bowling in an innings
- Ave – Average runs per wicket

Fielding

- Ca – Catches taken
- St – Stumpings affected

== List of players ==
Statistics are correct as of 23 June 2026.

Namibia T20I cricketers
General					Batting					Bowling				Fielding		Ref
No.	Name	First	Last	Mat	Runs	HS	Avg	50	100	Balls	Wkt	BBI	Ave	Ca	St	Ref
1	Stephan Baard	2019	2022	28	714	92	28.56	5	0	–	–	–	–	13	0	
2	Karl Birkenstock	2019	2021	9	81	59	27.00	1	0	30	0	–	–	2	0	
3	Niko Davin	2019	2025	37	969	89	29.36	6	0	–	–	–	–	18	0	
4	Gerhard Erasmus‡	2019	2026	88	2,178	100*	32.02	15	1	1,071	65	3/7	16.43	58	0	
5	Jan Frylinck	2019	2026	84	1,356	134	26.07	3	2	963	63	6/24	17.95	29	0	
6	Zane Green†	2019	2026	81	691	52*	16.85	1	0	–	–	–	–	62	8	
7	Zhivago Groenewald	2019	2019	10	20	13	6.33	0	0	168	8	3/20	20.37	3	0	
8	Tangeni Lungameni	2019	2025	41	16	12*	16.00	0	0	726	30	3/13	30.43	10	0	
9	Bernard Scholtz	2019	2026	83	83	9	10.37	0	0	1,684	84	4/12	21.08	18	0	
10	JJ Smit	2019	2026	74	1,307	111*	33.51	4	1	1,106	73	6/10	17.16	34	0	
11	Christi Viljoen	2019	2019	12	68	33	17.00	0	0	223	20	5/9	11.80	5	0	
12	Ben Shikongo	2019	2026	41	1	1*	0.33	0	0	615	38	3/21	18.23	11	0	
13	Craig Williams	2019	2022	35	805	81	27.75	6	0	174	9	3/9	20.11	3	0	
14	Pikky Ya France	2019	2022	21	32	13	4.57	0	0	180	6	1/3	32.00	3	0	
15	JP Kotze†	2019	2025	47	817	101*	21.50	2	1	–	–	–	–	20	4	
16	Lo-handre Louwrens	2019	2019	1	17	17*	–	0	0	–	–	–	–	0	0	
17	Michiel du Preez	2021	2021	3	62	33*	–	–	–	–	–	–	–	0	0	
18	Jan Nicol Loftie-Eaton‡†	2021	2026	60	796	101	19.90	1	1	458	26	4/10	22.30	29	0	
19	Ruben Trumpelmann	2021	2026	54	316	46	16.63	0	0	1015	54	4/21	26.24	17	0	
20	David Wiese (Note: David Wiese also played 19 Twenty20 International matches for South Africa. Only his record for Namibia is given above.)	2021	2024	34	532	66*	28.00	3	0	692	35	4/17	22.91	11	0	
21	Michael van Lingen	2021	2024	30	518	67	19.18	2	0	20	0	–	–	12	0	
22	Dylan Leicher	2022	2026	19	131	42*	18.71	0	0	72	3	1/4	38.66	1	0	
23	Divan la Cock	2022	2022	5	98	66	19.60	1	0	6	0	–	–	1	0	
24	Handre Klazinge	2023	2025	7	2	1*	2.00	0	0	96	10	4/19	10.30	3	0	
25	Peter-Daniel Blignaut	2024	2024	4	0	0	0.00	0	0	66	2	1/7	37.50	1	0	
26	Malan Kruger‡†	2024	2026	31	413	59*	15.29	1	0	–	–	–	–	6	0	
27	Jack Brassell	2024	2026	26	8	5*	8.00	0	0	427	23	3/26	26.65	4	0	
28	Shaun Fouché	2024	2024	3	42	40*	42.00	0	0	24	1	1/30	35.00	0	0	
29	Jan Balt	2024	2026	12	83	22	16.60	0	0	176	11	4/20	15.63	4	0	
30	Gerhard Janse van Rensburg	2024	2024	4	46	19	11.50	0	0	30	1	1/14	29.00	2	0	
31	Simon Shikongo	2024	2024	4	1	1*	1.00	0	0	48	3	1/6	17.66	1	0	
32	Jan-Izak de Villiers	2024	2025	8	2	1*	1.00	0	0	120	3	2/19	54.66	4	0	
33	Alexander Busing-Volschenk	2024	2026	12	213	73*	30.42	2	0	42	4	2/11	13.50	5	0	
34	Louren Steenkamp	2025	2026	14	331	58	23.64	2	0	–	–	–	–	5	0	
35	Max Heingo	2025	2026	10	0	0*	–	0	0	151	10	2/16	24.50	0	0	
36	Willem Myburgh	2026	2026	3	12	8	6.00	0	0	48	2	2/22	30.50	1	0	
37	Zacheo van Vuuren	2026	2026	1	12	12	12.00	0	0	–	–	–	–	0	0	
38	Liam Basson†	2026	2026	1	10	10*	–	0	0	–	–	–	–	0	0	
39	Waldo Smith	2026	2026	5	–	–	–	–	–	84	6	2/18	20.50	1	0	
40	Junior Taanyanda†	2026	2026	3	165	74*	82.50	2	0	–	–	–	–	0	0	

== See also ==
- List of Namibia ODI cricketers
