= Stephan Baard =

Namibian cricketer

Personal information
- Full name: Stephan Julian Baard
- Born: 29 April 1992 (age 34); Namibia
- Batting: Right-handed
- Bowling: Right-arm medium-fast
- Role: Batsman

International information
- National side: Namibia (2010–present)
- ODI debut (cap 16): 27 April 2019 v Oman
- Last ODI: 21 September 2022 v PNG
- T20I debut (cap 1): 20 May 2019 v Ghana
- Last T20I: 20 October 2022 v UAE

Career statistics
Competition	ODI	T20I	FC	LA
Matches	19	28	66	112
Runs scored	348	714	3,260	2,994
Batting average	18.31	28.56	25.66	27.21
100s/50s	0/2	0/5	2/17	3/19
Top score	73	92	114	132
Balls bowled	–	–	1,179	509
Wickets	–	–	14	10
Bowling average	–	–	52.00	43.70
5 wickets in innings	–	–	0	0
10 wickets in match	–	–	0	0
Best bowling	–	–	2/19	2/27
Catches/stumpings	5/–	13/–	37/–	41/–
- Source: Cricinfo, 23 October 2022

Stephan Julian Baard (born 29 April 1992) is a Namibian cricketer, who has played for the national cricket team.

== Career ==
In November 2016, he won the Player's Player of the Year award at Cricket Namibia's annual awards ceremony. In January 2018, he was named in Namibia's squad for the 2018 ICC World Cricket League Division Two tournament. In August 2018, Baard was named in Namibia's squad for the 2018 Africa T20 Cup.

In March 2019, he was named in Namibia's squad for the 2019 ICC World Cricket League Division Two tournament. He was named among the six players to watch during the tournament. Namibia finished among the top four teams in the tournament, therefore gaining One Day International (ODI) status. Baard made his ODI debut for Namibia on 27 April 2019, against Oman, in the tournament's final. He was the leading run-scorer for Namibia in the tournament, with 264 runs in six matches.

In May 2019, Baard was named in Namibia's squad for the Regional Finals of the 2018–19 ICC T20 World Cup Africa Qualifier tournament in Uganda. He made his Twenty20 International (T20I) debut against Ghana on 20 May 2019.

In June 2019, he was one of twenty-five cricketers to be named in Cricket Namibia's Elite Men's Squad ahead of the 2019–20 international season. In September 2019, he was named in Namibia's squad for the 2019 ICC T20 World Cup Qualifier tournament in the United Arab Emirates. In September 2021, Baard was named in Namibia's squad for the 2021 ICC Men's T20 World Cup.
