= Craig Williams (cricketer) =

Namibian cricketer

Personal information
- Full name: Craig George Williams
- Born: 25 February 1984 (age 42); Oshakati, South-West Africa
- Batting: Right-handed
- Bowling: Right-arm medium
- Role: Top order batsman

International information
- National side: Namibia (2019–2022)
- ODI debut (cap 25): 27 April 2019 v Oman
- Last ODI: 16 July 2022 v Nepal
- T20I debut (cap 13): 19 August 2019 v Botswana
- Last T20I: 24 May 2022 v Zimbabwe

Career statistics
Competition	ODI	T20I	FC	LA
Matches	18	35	93	167
Runs scored	488	805	6,484	5,011
Batting average	30.50	27.75	40.52	35.28
100s/50s	1/1	0/6	15/34	8/33
Top score	129*	81	184	129*
Balls bowled	288	174	6,561	3,668
Wickets	3	9	117	102
Bowling average	74.66	20.11	32.99	29.74
5 wickets in innings	0	0	4	1
10 wickets in match	0	0	0	0
Best bowling	1/37	3/9	5/22	6/37
Catches/stumpings	6/–	3/–	76/0	65/0
- Source: ESPNcricinfo, 20 July 2022

Craig George Williams (born 25 February 1984) is a Namibian retired cricketer. He currently runs a cricket shop in Namibia besides working as a quality/quantity surveyor writing reports for insurance companies as well as loss adjusting.

Williams also opened a cricket academy in Windhoek which is regarded as Namibia's first state of the art indoor training facility.

== Biography ==
He was born in South West Africa in 1984 and grew up in Pretoria, South Africa. He moved to his native country Namibia at the age of 23.

== Career ==
Williams made his first-class debut for the Namibian cricket team in 2007, in a Three-Day South African Provincial Challenge match against North West. Williams bowled four overs in the first innings of the match, conceding 23 runs. He scored a half-century in his debut first-class innings.

He scored twin centuries in the final of the 2009–10 ICC Intercontinental Shield against the United Arab Emirates to guide Namibia to Intercontinental Shield triumph in Dubai. He was also the leading run scorer of the 2009-10 ICC Intercontinental Shield with a tally of 498 runs in 4 matches.

Williams has since played for the Namibia A team, scoring a century against Canada in his first appearance in the side. In January 2018, he was named in Namibia's squad for the 2018 ICC World Cricket League Division Two tournament.

In February 2018, he retired from cricket, after playing for Namibia against Free State in the 2017–18 CSA Provincial One-Day Challenge. He was the leading run-scorer in the 2017–18 Sunfoil 3-Day Cup for Namibia, with 687 runs in eight matches. He initially retired with the intention of focusing on his family commitments and business. However, he was convinced by the head coach of Namibia, Pierre de Bruyn to come out of retirement given his experience at the highest level. After having discussions with the coach, Craig made comeback return to the national team in 2019.

In March 2019, he was named in Namibia's squad for the 2019 ICC World Cricket League Division Two tournament. Namibia finished in the top four places in the tournament, therefore gaining One Day International (ODI) status. Williams made his ODI debut for Namibia on 27 April 2019, against Oman, in the tournament's final.

In June 2019, he was one of twenty-five cricketers to be named in Cricket Namibia's Elite Men's Squad ahead of the 2019–20 international season. He made his Twenty20 International (T20I) debut for Namibia against Botswana on 19 August 2019 during Botswana's tour of Namibia. In September 2019, he was named in Namibia's squad for the 2019 ICC T20 World Cup Qualifier tournament in the United Arab Emirates.

On 8 January 2020, in the 2020 Oman Tri-Nation Series match against Oman, Williams scored his first century in an ODI, with an unbeaten 129. In September 2021, Williams was named in Namibia's squad for the 2021 ICC Men's T20 World Cup.

In October 2021, during the 2021 Summer T20 Bash, he became only the third batsman ever to score four consecutive half-centuries in T20Is after Brendon McCullum and Chris Gayle. He also matched the record for most fifties in consecutive T20I appearances. In September 2022, he once again retired from international cricket, marking the occasion by taking a wicket (clean bowled) with his last ball in international competition, against the South African Lions.
