= JJ Smit =

Namibian cricketer (born 1995)

Personal information
- Full name: Johannes Jonathan Smit
- Born: 10 November 1995 (age 31); Keetmanshoop, Namibia
- Batting: Right-handed
- Bowling: Left-arm medium-fast
- Role: Bowling all-rounder

International information
- National side: Namibia (2012–present)
- ODI debut (cap 23): 27 April 2019 v Oman
- Last ODI: 4 September 2025 v Scotland
- T20I debut (cap 10): 20 May 2019 v Ghana
- Last T20I: 11 October 2025 v South Africa

Career statistics
Competition	ODI	T20I	FC	LA
Matches	52	67	41	122
Runs scored	1,071	1,189	1,100	2,142
Batting average	26.12	33.97	18.33	25.80
100s/50s	0/3	1/4	0/3	1/5
Top score	94	111*	77	120
Balls bowled	1,657	968	4,760	4,904
Wickets	56	66	82	128
Bowling average	21.16	16.01	32.43	29.14
5 wickets in innings	2	1	1	3
10 wickets in match	0	0	0	0
Best bowling	5/26	6/10	5/29	5/26
Catches/stumpings	18/–	29/–	13/–	44/–
- Source: Cricinfo, 12 October 2025

Johannes Jonathan Smit (born 10 November 1995) is a Namibian cricketer who made his debut for the Namibian national side in February 2012, aged 16.

== Early career ==
A left-arm fast bowler from Keetmanshoop, Smit made his debut for the Namibian under-19 side during the 2011–12 season. He played five matches in that season's Khaya Majola Week, held in December 2011, with Namibia facing the South African domestic under-19 teams. Towards the end of the season, in February 2012, Smit was selected to make his first-class debut for the Namibian senior team. He took a single wicket on debut against Western Province in the South African Three-Day Provincial Competition, that of Mujahid Behardien. Smit played another first-class match the following season, again against Western Province. He again featured for the under-19s in Khaya Majola Week, and took seven wickets, behind only Bredell Wessels for Namibia. His twelve maiden overs at the tournament were bettered by only two players – KwaZulu-Natal's Kyle Simmonds (17) and Easterns' Vincent Moore (14).

At the 2013 ICC Africa Under-19 Championship, played in Uganda in May 2013, Smit took 12 wickets, behind only Kenya's Paramveer Singh. He was also named Player of the Final, after taking 4/17 from eight overs, including a hat-trick, to help Namibia defeat Kenya by 52 runs, and thus qualify for the 2014 Under-19 World Cup. Smit made his under-19 One Day International (ODI) debut at the World Cup, played in the United Arab Emirates in February 2014. He featured in all six of Namibia's matches at the tournament, with his eight wickets behind only Bredell Wessells' 14 for Namibia. Generally opening the bowling with either Marius Delport or Kobus Brand, his best figures, 3/55, came against Australia.

== International career ==
Outside of his under-19 appearances, Smit has become a regular for the Namibian senior side in both South African domestic tournaments and international competitions, featuring at the 2013 Intercontinental Cup and WCL Championship, the 2013 World Twenty20 Qualifier, and the 2014 World Cup Qualifier. Against Kenya at the 2014 World Cup Qualifier in New Zealand, he took 3/23 from ten overs opening with Louis Klazinga, limiting Kenya to 186/8 from their 50 overs. Batting ninth in Namibia's innings, he came to the wicket with the score at 144/7, after Sarel Burger's dismissal, and subsequently scored 33 not out from 25 balls. Namibia won by two wickets (with seven balls remaining), and Smit was named man of the match.

In January 2018, he was named in Namibia's squad for the 2018 ICC World Cricket League Division Two tournament. He was a member of Namibia's squad for the 2018 Africa T20 Cup.

In March 2019, he was named in Namibia's squad for the 2019 ICC World Cricket League Division Two tournament. Namibia finished in the top four places in the tournament, therefore gaining One Day International (ODI) status. Smit made his ODI debut for Namibia on 27 April 2019, against Oman, in the tournament's final. Following the conclusion of the competition, Smit was named as the Player of the Tournament.

In May 2019, he was named in Namibia's squad for the Regional Finals of the 2018–19 ICC T20 World Cup Africa Qualifier tournament in Uganda. He made his Twenty20 International (T20I) debut for Namibia against Ghana on 20 May 2019.

In June 2019, he was selected to play for the Vancouver Knights franchise team in the 2019 Global T20 Canada tournament. In doing so, he became the first Namibian cricketer to sign for an international T20 franchise. Later the same month, he was one of twenty-five cricketers to be named in Cricket Namibia's Elite Men's Squad ahead of the 2019–20 international season. In September 2019, he was named in Namibia's squad for the 2019 ICC T20 World Cup Qualifier tournament in the United Arab Emirates. He was the leading wicket-taker for Namibia in the tournament, with sixteen dismissals in nine matches.

In September 2021, Smit was named as the vice-captain of Namibia's squad for the 2021 ICC Men's T20 World Cup. In November 2021, Smit was named as the captain of Namibia's team for the 2021 Namibia Tri-Nation Series after Gerhard Erasmus was ruled out due to an injury.

On 10 April 2022, in the final match against Uganda, Smit became the first bowler for Namibia to take a hat-trick in T20I cricket. He also took his first five-wicket haul in a T20I match, finishing with figures of six wickets for ten runs from his four overs.

In May 2024, he was named in Namibia's squad for the 2024 ICC Men's T20 World Cup tournament.

In January 2026, Smit was named in Namibia's squad for the 2026 T20 World Cup.
