= Bernard Scholtz =

Namibian cricketer (born 1990)

Personal information
- Full name: Bernard Martinus Scholtz
- Born: 3 October 1990 (age 36); Keetmanshoop, ǁKaras Region, Namibia
- Batting: Right-handed
- Bowling: Slow left-arm orthodox
- Relatives: Nicolaas Scholtz (brother)

International information
- National side: Namibia (2008–2025)
- ODI debut (cap 22): 27 April 2019 v Oman
- Last ODI: 4 September 2025 v Scotland
- T20I debut (cap 9): 20 May 2019 v Ghana
- Last T20I: 11 October 2025 v South Africa

Career statistics
Competition	ODI	T20I	FC	LA
Matches	64	76	102	180
Runs scored	313	73	1,363	693
Batting average	12.52	12.16	11.75	9.90
100s/50s	0/0	0/0	0/3	0/0
Top score	31*	9	63	31*
Balls bowled	3,371	1,516	13,396	8,061
Wickets	100	79	235	213
Bowling average	18.89	19.79	33.17	24.68
5 wickets in innings	2	0	15	2
10 wickets in match	0	0	2	0
Best bowling	5/22	4/12	8/33	5/22
Catches/stumpings	6/–	18/–	23/–	18/–
- Source: Cricinfo, 12 October 2025

Bernard Martinus Scholtz (born 3 October 1990) is a Namibian cricketer. Born in Keetmanshoop, he is a right-handed batsman and a slow left-arm bowler. His brother, Nicolaas, four years his senior, has played first-class cricket since 2004.

== Career ==
Scholtz played for the Namibia under-19 national team at the 2008 Under-19 Cricket World Cup in Malaysia. He made five appearances during the competition proper, taking six wickets. He scored just two runs, but remained not out on every occasion.

Scholtz made his first-class debut in October 2008 against North West, scoring a second-ball duck in his debut innings. He was Namibia's youngest player at the 2009 Cricket World Cup Qualifier in South Africa. Playing against Boland in 2014-15 he took 8 for 116 and 5 for 66. In November 2016, he was named Player of the Year by Cricket Namibia at their annual awards ceremony. In January 2018, he was named in Namibia's squad for the 2018 ICC World Cricket League Division Two tournament.

He was the leading wicket-taker in the 2017–18 Sunfoil 3-Day Cup for Namibia, with 35 dismissals in nine matches.

In August 2018, he was named in Namibia's squad for the 2018 Africa T20 Cup. In October 2018, he was named in Namibia's squad in the Southern sub region group for the 2018–19 ICC World Twenty20 Africa Qualifier tournament in Botswana.

In March 2019, he was named in Namibia's squad for the 2019 ICC World Cricket League Division Two tournament. Namibia finished in the top four places in the tournament, therefore gaining One Day International (ODI) status. Scholtz made his ODI debut for Namibia on 27 April 2019, against Oman, in the tournament's final.

In May 2019, he was named in Namibia's squad for the Regional Finals of the 2018–19 ICC T20 World Cup Africa Qualifier tournament in Uganda. He made his Twenty20 International (T20I) debut for Namibia against Ghana on 20 May 2019.

In June 2019, he was one of twenty-five cricketers to be named in Cricket Namibia's Elite Men's Squad ahead of the 2019–20 international season. In September 2019, he was named in Namibia's squad for the 2019 ICC T20 World Cup Qualifier tournament in the United Arab Emirates.

In September 2021, Scholtz was named in Namibia's squad for the 2021 ICC Men's T20 World Cup. In July 2022, in round 14 of the 2019–2023 ICC Cricket World Cup League 2 tournament, Scholtz took his first five-wicket haul in ODIs.

In May 2024, he was named in Namibia's squad for the 2024 ICC Men's T20 World Cup tournament.

In January 2026, Scholtz was named in Namibia's squad for the 2026 T20 World Cup.
