= Ruben Trumpelmann =

South African cricketer (born 1998)

Personal information
- Born: 1 February 1998 (age 28); Durban, KwaZulu-Natal, South Africa
- Batting: Right-handed
- Bowling: Left-arm fast

International information
- National side: Namibia
- ODI debut (cap 31): 26 November 2021 v Oman
- Last ODI: 4 September 2025 v Scotland
- T20I debut (cap 19): 5 October 2021 v UAE
- Last T20I: 11 October 2025 v South Africa

Career statistics
Competition	ODI	T20I	FC	LA
Matches	49	44	17	62
Runs scored	532	267	345	702
Batting average	16.12	19.07	20.29	17.55
100s/50s	0/2	0/0	0/2	0/4
Top score	55*	46	73	67
Balls bowled	2,294	782	1,944	2,939
Wickets	73	49	41	86
Bowling average	25.45	20.97	24.75	27.40
5 wickets in innings	2	0	0	2
10 wickets in match	0	0	0	0
Best bowling	5/30	4/21	4/27	5/30
Catches/stumpings	17/–	10/–	5/–	20/–
- Source: Cricinfo, 12 October 2025

Ruben Trumpelmann (born 1 February 1998) is a South African-born Namibian cricketer, who now plays for the Namibia cricket team.

== Early life and education ==
Trumpelmann was born in Durban, South Africa to a Namibian-born father, and spent his early life in Pretoria. He was educated at Afrikaanse Hoër Seunskool, South Africa.

== Career ==
He made his List A debut for Northerns in the 2017–18 CSA Provincial One-Day Challenge on 12 November 2017. He made his first-class debut for Northerns in the 2017–18 Sunfoil 3-Day Cup on 23 November 2017.

In September 2018, he was named in Northerns' squad for the 2018 Africa T20 Cup. He made his Twenty20 debut for Northerns in the 2018 Africa T20 Cup on 14 September 2018. He was the leading wicket-taker for Northerns in the 2018–19 CSA 3-Day Provincial Cup, with 23 dismissals in eight matches.

Trumpelmann became eligible to play international cricket for Namibia due to his father having been born in Windhoek. In March 2021, he was named in Namibia's Twenty20 International (T20I) squad for their series against Uganda, and in September that year in Namibia's Twenty20 International (T20I) squad for the 2021 ICC Men's T20 World Cup. He was also named in Namibia's T20I squad for the 2021 Summer T20 Bash, played just before the World Cup. He made his T20I debut on 5 October 2021, for Namibia against the United Arab Emirates.

In November 2021, he was named in Namibia's One Day International (ODI) squad for the 2021 Namibia Tri-Nation Series. He made his ODI debut on 26 November 2021, for Namibia against Oman.

In May 2024, he was named in Namibia's squad for the 2024 ICC Men's T20 World Cup tournament.

In January 2026, Trumpelmann was named in Namibia's squad for the 2026 T20 World Cup.
