= Ben Shikongo =

Namibian cricketer (born 2000)

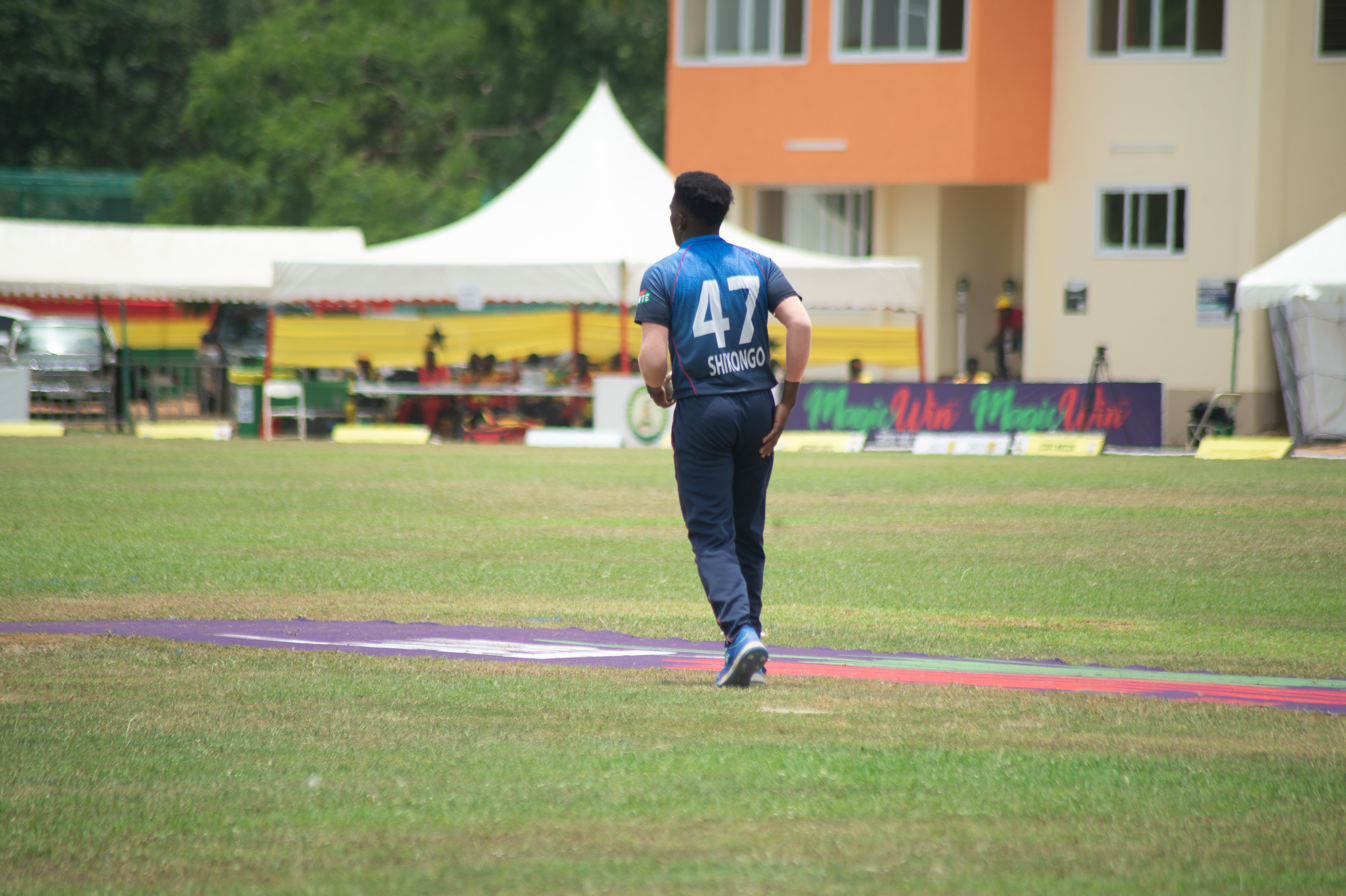

Personal information
- Born: 8 May 2000 (age 26); Ongombesa, Oshikoto Region, Namibia
- Batting: Right-handed
- Bowling: Right-arm medium-fast
- Role: Bowler

International information
- National side: Namibia
- ODI debut (cap 28): 6 January 2020 v UAE
- Last ODI: 4 September 2025 v Scotland
- T20I debut (cap 12): 19 August 2019 v Botswana
- Last T20I: 11 October 2025 v South Africa

Career statistics
Competition	ODI	T20I	FC	LA
Matches	23	40	2	30
Runs scored	22	1	8	31
Batting average	5.50	0.50	4.00	4.42
100s/50s	0/0	0/0	0/0	0/0
Top score	4	1*	4*	4*
Balls bowled	858	597	210	1,114
Wickets	25	37	4	32
Bowling average	35.08	17.62	34.25	35.68
5 wickets in innings	0	0	0	0
10 wickets in match	0	0	0	0
Best bowling	4/29	3/21	3/87	4/29
Catches/stumpings	7/–	10/–	0/–	8/–
- Source: Cricinfo, 12 October 2025

Ben Shikongo (born 8 May 2000) is a Namibian cricketer. He made his first-class debut for Namibia in the 2017–18 Sunfoil 3-Day Cup on 8 February 2018.

== Career ==
He was previously named in Namibia's squad for the 2018 Under-19 Cricket World Cup. He made his List A debut for Namibia in the 2017–18 CSA Provincial One-Day Challenge on 11 February 2018.

In June 2019, he was one of twenty-five cricketers to be named in Cricket Namibia's Elite Men's Squad ahead of the 2019–20 international season. He made his Twenty20 International (T20I) debut for Namibia against Botswana on 19 August 2019 during Botswana's tour of Namibia. Later the same month, he was named in Namibia's One Day International (ODI) squad for the 2019 United States Tri-Nation Series.

In September 2019, he was named in Namibia's squad for the 2019 ICC T20 World Cup Qualifier tournament in the United Arab Emirates. In December 2019, he was named in Namibia's One Day International (ODI) squad for the 2020 Oman Tri-Nation Series. He made his ODI debut for Namibia, against the United Arab Emirates, on 6 January 2020.

In September 2021, Shikongo was named in Namibia's squad for the 2021 ICC Men's T20 World Cup.

In May 2024, he was named in Namibia's squad for the 2024 ICC Men's T20 World Cup tournament.

In January 2026, Shikongo was named in Namibia's squad for the 2026 T20 World Cup.
