= Jan Frylinck =

Namibian cricketer (born 1994)

Personal information
- Full name: Jan Nicolaas Frylinck
- Born: 6 April 1994 (age 32); Bellville, South Africa
- Batting: Left-handed
- Bowling: Left-arm medium-fast

International information
- National side: Namibia (2017–present)
- ODI debut (cap 19): 27 April 2019 v Oman
- Last ODI: 4 September 2025 v Scotland
- T20I debut (cap 5): 20 May 2019 v Ghana
- Last T20I: 11 October 2025 v South Africa

Domestic team information
- Years: Team
- 2010–2013: Boland
- 2013–2016: Northern Cape

Career statistics
Competition	ODI	T20I	FC	LA
Matches	48	74	45	107
Runs scored	946	1,041	1,571	1,950
Batting average	24.89	24.78	23.44	25.65
100s/50s	1/6	1/2	1/11	3/8
Top score	114	134	158	126*
Balls bowled	1,388	963	5040	3,982
Wickets	37	63	97	116
Bowling average	27.94	17.95	27.40	26.93
5 wickets in innings	1	1	2	1
10 wickets in match	0	0	1	0
Best bowling	5/13	6/24	7/32	5/13
Catches/stumpings	16/–	27/–	15/–	39/–
- Source: Cricinfo, 12 October 2025

Jan Nicolaas Frylinck (born 6 April 1994) is a South African-born Namibian cricketer who currently plays for Namibia national cricket team. He is a left-handed batsman and left-arm medium-fast bowler. Frylinck made his first-class debut for Boland on 24 March 2011 against Western Province.

== Career ==
Frylinck represented the South Africa Under-19 cricket team in several youth One Day International matches. He was included in the Griqualand West cricket team squad for the 2015 Africa T20 Cup.

Frylinck is a Namibian citizen by descent, his father being born in Walvis Bay. He was named in Namibia's squad for an Intercontinental Cup game against Papua New Guinea in October 2016, but had to withdraw due to not receiving confirmation of his eligibility in time. He was the leading run-scorer in the 2017–18 CSA Provincial One-Day Challenge tournament for Namibia, with 367 runs in eight matches. Frylinck was also the leading wicket-taker in the tournament for Namibia, with 16 dismissals in eight matches. In January 2018, he was named in Namibia's squad for the 2018 ICC World Cricket League Division Two tournament.

In August 2018, Frylinck was named in Namibia's squad for the 2018 Africa T20 Cup. In October 2018, he was named as the captain of Namibia's squad for the Southern sub region group for the 2018–19 ICC World Twenty20 Africa Qualifier tournament in Botswana.

In March 2019, he was named as the vice-captain of Namibia's squad for the 2019 ICC World Cricket League Division Two tournament. Namibia finished in the top four places in the tournament, therefore gaining One Day International (ODI) status. Frylinck made his ODI debut for Namibia on 27 April 2019, against Oman, in the tournament's final. In the match, he became the first bowler for Namibia to take a five-wicket haul on debut in an ODI, finishing with five wickets for thirteen runs from eight overs. He was the leading wicket-taker for Namibia in the tournament, with 14 dismissals in six matches.

In May 2019, he was named in Namibia's squad for the Regional Finals of the 2018–19 ICC T20 World Cup Africa Qualifier tournament in Uganda. He made his Twenty20 International (T20I) debut against Ghana on 20 May 2019.

In June 2019, he was one of twenty-five cricketers to be named in Cricket Namibia's Elite Men's Squad ahead of the 2019–20 international season. In September 2019, he was named in Namibia's squad for the 2019 ICC T20 World Cup Qualifier tournament in the United Arab Emirates. In September 2021, Frylinck was named in Namibia's squad for the 2021 ICC Men's T20 World Cup. The following month, in the opening match of the 2021 Summer T20 Bash tournament, Frylinck took his first five-wicket haul in T20I cricket.

In May 2024, he was named in Namibia's squad for the 2024 ICC Men's T20 World Cup tournament.

In January 2026, Frylinck was named in Namibia's squad for the 2026 T20 World Cup.
