= Cricket Namibia =

Sports governing body in Namibia

- Sport: Cricket
- Jurisdiction: Namibia
- Founded: 1930
- Affiliation: International Cricket Council
- Affiliation date: 1992
- Regional affiliation: Africa
- Location: Windhoek, Namibia

Official website
- www.cricketnamibia.com
- (Namibia)

The Namibia Cricket Board, known commercially as Cricket Namibia, is the official governing body of the sport of cricket in Namibia. It has its headquarters in Windhoek, which is the capital and most populous city of Namibia. Cricket Namibia is Namibia's representative at the International Cricket Council and has been an associate member of the council since 1992. It is also a Member of the African Cricket Association.

== Board Members ==
President - Rudie van Vuuren

Vice President - Mr Polly Negongo

Member - Mr Daneel van der Walt

Member - Henno Prinsloo

Member - Helga Volschenk

Member - Trevor Britten

CEO of Cricket Namibia - Mr Johan Muller

== Domestic leagues ==
- Richelieu Franchise T20

Three Ships Premier League (50 overs & T20)

CCD I (Centre of Cricket Development)

United I

Wanderers I

Welwitschia

WHSOBCC (Windhoek High School Old Boy's Cricket Club)

Three Ships 1st Division League Central (40 overs & T20)

CCD II

United II

Wanderers II

WHSOBCC II

WHSOBCC V

Gobabis 1st XI

Zebra 1

Mariental

Three Ships 1st Division League Coastal (40 overs & T20)

Blue Waters

JCCA

Sparta

Swakopmund 1

Swakopmund 2

Three Ships 2nd Division League Coastal

CCD 3

WHSOBCC 3

Zebra 2

Mariental 2

Otjiwarongo

Oranjemund

Oshiponga NDF

Green Mambas

Women's cricket teams

Zebra

Blue Waters

Sparta

WHS

Pro-Ed

== Grounds ==
- Defence Force Ground
- Trans Namib Ground
- United Ground, Windhoek
- Wanderers Cricket Ground
- Windhoek High School
- WAP Cricket Ground
- Sparta Cricket Ground
- Doc Jubber Cricket Field
- Walvis Bay Cricket Oval
- Swakopmund Vineta Cricket Field
- Namibia Cricket Ground

== See also ==
- Namibia national cricket team
- Namibia women's national cricket team
- Namibia national cricket team
- Namibia national under-19 cricket team
- Namibia women's national under-19 cricket team
