= Namibia national cricket team =

Namibia
- Nicknames: The Eagles; The Visarends
- Association: Cricket Namibia

Personnel
- Captain: Gerhard Erasmus
- Coach: Craig Williams

International Cricket Council
- ICC status: Associate Member with ODI status (1992)
- ICC region: Africa
ICC Rankings	Current	Best-ever
ODI	18th	14th (22 September 2022)
T20I	14th	11th (22 November 2023)

One Day Internationals
- First ODI: v. Zimbabwe at the Harare Sports Club, Harare; 10 February 2003
- Last ODI: v. Ireland at High Performance Oval, Windhoek; 1 November 2026
ODIs	Played	Won/Lost
Total	91	41/46 (1 tie, 3 no results)
This year	20	9/9 (0 ties, 2 no results)
- World Cup appearances: 1 (first in 2003)
- Best result: First round (2003)
- World Cup Qualifier appearances: 6 (first in 1994)
- Best result: Runner-up (2001)

T20 Internationals
- First T20I: v. Ghana at Kyambogo Cricket Oval, Kampala; 20 May 2019
- Last T20I: v. South Africa at Namibia Cricket Ground, Windhoek; 4 September 2026
T20Is	Played	Won/Lost
Total	99	57/40 (1 ties, 1 no result)
This year	15	6/9 (0 ties, 0 no results)
- T20 World Cup appearances: 4 (first in 2021)
- Best result: Super 12 (2021)
- T20 World Cup Qualifier appearances: 6 (Note: For the 2024 and 2026 Men's T20 World Cups, the final round of qualification in Africa was the ICC Africa Regional Final.) (first in 2012)
- Best result: Champions (2023)
ODI and T20I kit
- As of 1 November 2026

The Namibia men's national cricket team represents Namibia in international cricket. It is administered by Cricket Namibia, the governing body of cricket in Namibia, which has been an associate member of the International Cricket Council since 1992.

A team representing South West Africa played in South African domestic competitions prior to Namibia's independence in 1990. After joining the ICC, the country soon became one of the leading ICC associate members in Africa. Namibia finished second at the 2001 ICC Trophy, thereby qualifying for the 2003 Cricket World Cup in South Africa. The team made its One Day International (ODI) debut at the tournament but failed to win a match. Beginning in 2004, Namibia participated in every edition of the ICC Intercontinental Cup, finishing runners-up in 2007–08. It also featured at the highest levels of the World Cricket League (WCL), twice participating in the WCL Championship, and finished third at the 2012 ICC World Twenty20 Qualifier.

Namibia were runners-up at the 2019 WCL Division Two tournament to secure the ODI status and qualify for the 2019–2023 ICC Cricket World Cup League 2. The team finished fourth at the 2019 ICC Men's T20 World Cup Qualifier to qualify for the 2021 ICC Men's T20 World Cup. It subsequently recorded its first World Cup victories, defeating the Netherlands and Ireland in the first round of the tournament to progress to the Super 12 stage.

== History ==
The earliest instance of cricket being played in Windhoek dates back to 1909 when South West Africa was a German colony. During the First World War (1914), South African troops opened assault in the region. A game of cricket was recorded in the Okonjande prisoner of war camp near Otjiwarongo. South Africa captured South West Africa following Germany's defeat. It came under the League of Nations mandate in the Union of South Africa.

The South West Africa Cricket Union was formed in 1930 and the first organised matches were played in the region. South West Africa began playing in the South African Country Cricket Association's annual competition in the 1961–62 season.

=== South West Africa (1961–1989) ===
South West Africa competed in the South African Country Cricket Association's annual competition between 1961 and 1989. In 1966, the Namibian war of Independence was launched by the People's Liberation Army of Namibia, an armed wing of SWAPO. South West African rebels welcomed the sporting boycott of the South African apartheid regime and lent their support to the "Stop the seventy tour" campaign.

South West Africa played their last domestic season in South Africa in January 1989. In April, PLAN launched its final guerrilla campaign and the South West Africa Cricket Union severed their ties with the South African Cricket Board (SACB).

In November 1989, a Namibian team toured Botswana and played their first international fixture, although the Namibian Cricket Board were not affiliated to the International Cricket Council until 1992.

=== Initial years ===
After the Botswana tour, Gloucestershire County Cricket Club visited Namibia in March 1990, taking part in the Independence Day celebrations. This was followed by a visit from The Netherlands in April. Before the formation of the African Cricket Association, the SCSA Zone VI cricket federation was formed after two schoolboy cricket tours between Namibia and Botswana in 1989 and 1990. The inaugural ACA tournament was held in Windhoek in September 1991, with Zambia, Malawi, Namibia, Lesotho and Botswana playing as well as an Oxford University Cricket Club side.

=== 2003 World Cup ===
The road to the 2003 Cricket World Cup started with the 2001 ICC Trophy in Canada. Namibia reached the final at the Toronto Cricket, Skating and Curling Club, losing to the Netherlands, but still qualifying for their first World Cup. Namibia then hosted the ICC 6 Nations Challenge in April 2002, finishing fourth and had a disappointing Africa Cup campaign that September, finishing fourth in their group and beating only Tanzania, before losing four matches against Zimbabwe A a few weeks later. A tour of Kenya was more successful, as Namibia beat Kenya in a four match one-day series. Following this, Namibia took part in the top level of South African domestic one-day cricket, the Standard Bank Cup, but lost all five of their games. Bangladesh toured in January 2003, winning the five match one-day series 4–1.

The World Cup itself started on 10 February 2003 in Harare with Zimbabwe beating Namibia by 86 runs in Namibia's debut One Day International (ODI).

10 February 2003
Scorecard

Zimbabwe; 340/2 (50 overs)	v	Namibia; 104/5 (25.1 overs)

Zimbabwe won by 86 runs (D/L)
Harare Sports Club, Harare, Zimbabwe
(First ODI match for Namibia)

They went on to lose to Pakistan by 171 runs, before a 55 run defeat at the hands of England in which Namibia performed with some credit, Jan-Berrie Burger winning the man of the match award for his innings of 85 runs that came close to helping the side pull off an unlikely upset. They then lost by 181 runs to India and by 256 runs against Australia, the eventual winners of the tournament, in what at the time was the biggest winning margin in One Day Internationals. The tournament finished with a 64 run loss to fellow qualifiers the Netherlands.

=== After the World Cup ===
In August 2003, Zimbabwe A toured Namibia. Namibia won the one-day series 2–1, but lost both three-day games. A return visit to Zimbabwe the following January saw Namibia win a five match one-day series against Zimbabwe A 4–1, also winning a match against Zimbabwe Under-19s. Bangladesh toured Namibia in February, winning all three one-day games and drawing the three-day game. Following this, Namibia travelled to the United Arab Emirates for the 2004 ICC Six Nations Challenge. They finished third on run rate after beating Canada, the Netherlands and the UAE and losing to Scotland and the USA. Namibia played two ICC Intercontinental Cup matches against Kenya and Uganda in 2004, losing them both. In between the two matches, they won an African nations tournament in Zambia. Later in the year, they took part in Zimbabwe's national one-day domestic competition, in which they finished as runners-up. Whilst in Zimbabwe, they won two matches against the national side. This was followed by a visit to Namibia by England, who won both matches.

Zimbabwe A again visited Namibia in early 2005, losing both one-day matches that finished. Pakistan A were the next visitors in April, winning all three one-day matches and drawing in the three-day game. This was followed by their two regional group games in the 2005 ICC Intercontinental Cup. Whilst they were unbeaten, winning against Uganda and drawing against Kenya, this was not enough to qualify for the semi-finals. They then visited Ireland to take part in the 2005 ICC Trophy. They finished 7th after beating Denmark in their final play-off game. Back at home, they hosted New Zealand at the end of July, losing both games, losing by only 29 runs after conceding 330/6. In October of that year, they hosted the semi-finals of the Intercontinental Cup, despite failing to qualify. While the final was being played, they played a two match one-day series against Bermuda after they had been knocked out of the tournament, winning both games, but the games were tarnished by controversial incidents, with the Bermuda team accusing the Namibian team of racist insults, and walking off in the second game when a flurry of bouncers were unleashed at the lower order Bermuda batsmen. The Namibian Cricket Board denied the allegations of racism.

In March 2006, Namibia met Nepal in a challenge match to decide who got the eighth and final spot in the 2006 ICC Intercontinental Cup. The match was drawn, with Namibia getting a first innings lead, thus qualifying them for the main tournament. The main tournament itself started with an innings defeat by Scotland in Aberdeen before a five wicket defeat by Ireland in Dublin, both matches in May. In the 2006–07 South African cricket season, Namibia took part in the second tier of first-class and List A cricket, the South African Airways Challenge. They finished second in their group in the three-day tournament and third in their group in the one-day tournament, missing out on reaching the semi-finals by one win. In the midst of the matches in those tournaments, they played their third and final 2006 Intercontinental Cup match, beating the UAE by an innings. On 1 April 2007, they became part of the ICC's High Performance Program.

In November/December 2007, Namibia hosted Division Two of the World Cricket League where they played against Argentina, Denmark, Oman, the UAE and Uganda. Although Namibia won three of their five group matches, it was not enough for them to progress to the final. Namibia beat Denmark in the third place playoff. On the basis of their top four finish in this tournament, Namibia qualified for the ICC World Cup Qualifier in 2009, the final tournament in qualification for the 2011 World Cup.

Namibia again took part in the second tier of South African domestic cricket between October 2007 and February 2008. They played a 2007–08 ICC Intercontinental Cup match against Canada in October 2007, playing the remaining games against Bermuda, Ireland, Kenya, the Netherlands, Scotland and the UAE in 2008.

Namibia won the 2009–10 ICC Intercontinental Shield defeating the United Arab Emirates by six wickets in Dubai. In 2011 Namibia participated in Division Two and finished as runners-up, on this occasion behind the UAE.

In July 2011, the country competed in the ICC Twenty20 World Cricket League Africa Division One competition in Uganda, winning all eight group matches before succumbing to the hosts in the Final by six wickets. During this tournament, all-rounder Louis van der Westhuizen struck 16 sixes in an innings of 159* against Kenya, as part of a team total of 262/1 from 20 overs.

=== The Golden Generation ===
In April 2018, the ICC decided to grant full Twenty20 International (T20I) status to all its members. Therefore, all Twenty20 matches played between Namibia and other ICC members since 1 January 2019 have the full T20I status. Namibia's first T20I match was against Ghana on 20 May 2019 in the Regional Final of the 2018–19 ICC World Twenty20 Africa Qualifier tournament. They won the match comfortably.

20 May 2019
13:50
Scorecard

Ghana; 91/7 (20 overs)	v	Namibia; 92/1 (10.5 overs)
Simon Ateak 26 (22); Zhivago Groenewald 3/20 (4 overs)		Stephan Baard 52* (34); Vincent Ateak 1/27 (3 overs)

Namibia won by 9 wickets
Kyambogo Cricket Oval, Kampala
Umpires: Iknow Chabi (Zim) and Kehinde Olanbiwonnu (Nga)
Player of the match: Stephan Baard (Nam)

- Namibia won the toss and elected to field.
- First T20I match for Namibia.

In July 2020, the Namibia Men's team won the ICC Associate Member Men's Performance of the Year award, after gaining One Day International (ODI) status, in the ICC's Annual Development Awards to recognise developing cricketing nations.

Namibia qualified for the 2021 ICC T20 World Cup in the United Arab Emirates when they finished 4th in the 2019 ICC Men's T20 World Cup Qualifier tournament in October and November 2019. They lost their first match against Sri Lanka but recorded a historic first-ever win at a World Cup event when they beat The Netherlands by 6 wickets in Abu Dhabi on 20 October 2021. On 22 October 2021 in the next match against Ireland, Namibia made history by winning the match by 8 wickets and qualified for the Super 12 stage of the tournament. On 27 October 2021, in the first Super 12 match for Namibia, they registered another historic win, defeating Scotland by 4 wickets.

22 October
14:00
Scorecard

Ireland; 125/8 (20 overs)	v	Namibia; 126/2 (18.3 overs)
Paul Stirling 38 (24); Jan Frylinck 3/21 (4 overs)		Gerhard Erasmus 53* (49); Curtis Campher 2/14 (3 overs)

Namibia won by 8 wickets
Sharjah Cricket Stadium, Sharjah
Umpires: Chris Brown (NZ) and Aleem Dar (Pak)
Player of the match: David Wiese (Nam)

- Ireland won the toss and elected to bat.
- Namibia qualified for the Super 12 stage.

In the 2022 ICC T20 World Cup, Namibia defeated Asia Cup champions and world number 8 side Sri Lanka in a stunning upset to open the tournament.

16 October 2022
15:00
Scorecard

Namibia; 163/7 (20 overs)	v	Sri Lanka; 108 (19 overs)
Jan Frylinck 44 (28); Pramod Madushan 2/37 (4 overs)		Dasun Shanaka 29 (23); David Wiese 2/16 (4 overs)

Namibia won by 55 runs
Kardinia Park, Geelong
Umpires: Rod Tucker (Aus) and Joel Wilson (WI)
Player of the match: Jan Frylinck (Nam)

- Sri Lanka won the toss and elected to field.

Namibia are participating in the inaugural 2023 Cricket World Cup Qualifier Play-off, a part of the qualification process for 2023 Cricket World Cup, as the hosts. They got their maiden win in the tournament against Papua New Guinea, as they won the match by 48 runs. Namibia's score of 381/8 was the highest total by an associate nation in an ODI match.

The South African cricket team toured Namibia in October 2025 for a one-off Twenty20 International (T20I) match to inaugurate the opening of Cricket Namibia's first official stadium, the Namibia Cricket Ground in Windhoek. It was the first-ever international match between the two sides. Namibia won the match by 4 wickets in a last ball thrilling upset.

11 October 2025
14:00
Scorecard

South Africa; 134/8 (20 overs)	v	Namibia; 138/6 (20 overs)
Jason Smith 31 (30); Ruben Trumpelmann 3/28 (4 overs)		Zane Green 30* (23); Nandre Burger 2/21 (4 overs)

Namibia won by 4 wickets
Namibia Cricket Ground, Windhoek
Umpires: Stephen Harris (SA) and Andrew Louw (Nam)
Player of the match: Ruben Trumpelmann (Nam)

- South Africa won the toss and elected to bat.

== Team image ==
The Namibian cricket team are known by the nickname "the Eagles" (the Visarends in Afrikaner). Traditionally, the team's home kit is a mix of blue and black shades.

== International grounds ==
Locations of all stadiums which have hosted an international cricket match within Namibia

== Records ==
International match summary – Namibia

Last updated 1 November 2026

Playing record
Format	M	W	L	T	D/NR	Inaugural match
One-Day Internationals	91	41	46	1	3	10 February 2003
Twenty20 Internationals	99	57	40	1	1	20 May 2019

=== One-Day Internationals ===
- Highest team total: 381/8 v. Papua New Guinea on 29 March 2023 at United Ground, Windhoek.
- Highest individual score: 136, Jean-Pierre Kotze v. United States on 20 September 2019 at Central Broward Regional Park, Lauderhill.
- Best individual bowling figures: 6/42, Tangeni Lungameni v. Papua New Guinea on 26 November 2022 at Wanderers, Windhoek.

Most ODI runs for Namibia

Player	Runs	Average	Career span
Gerhard Erasmus	2,840	39.44	2019–2026
Michael van Lingen	1,680	36.52	2021–2026
Jan Frylinck	1,607	29.21	2019–2026
Zane Green	1,279	24.13	2019–2026
Jan Nicol Loftie-Eaton	1,240	25.83	2021–2026

Most ODI wickets for Namibia

Player	Wickets	Average	Career span
Bernard Scholtz	115	21.15	2019–2026
Ruben Trumpelmann	98	27.05	2021–2026
JJ Smit	82	22.21	2019–2026
Gerhard Erasmus	62	27.17	2019–2026
Tangeni Lungameni	52	23.73	2022–2025

ODI record versus other nations

Records complete to ODI #5056. Last updated 1 November 2026.

Opponent	M	W	L	T	NR	First match	First win
Full members
Australia	1	0	1	0	0	27 February 2003	
England	1	0	1	0	0	19 February 2003	
India	1	0	1	0	0	23 February 2003	
Ireland	5	3	2	0	0	22 October 2026	24 October 2026
Pakistan	1	0	1	0	0	16 February 2003	
South Africa	3	0	3	0	0	9 September 2026	
Zimbabwe	1	0	1	0	0	10 February 2003	
Associate Members
Canada	5	4	0	1	0	4 April 2023	4 April 2023
Jersey	1	1	0	0	0	30 March 2023	30 March 2023
Nepal	10	7	2	0	1	11 July 2022	11 July 2022
Netherlands	7	2	5	0	0	3 March 2003	23 February 2024
Oman	13	8	5	0	0	27 April 2019	27 April 2019
Papua New Guinea	7	7	0	0	0	22 September 2019	22 September 2019
Scotland	11	1	9	0	1	10 July 2022	5 December 2022
United Arab Emirates	11	3	7	0	1	6 January 2020	25 February 2023
United States	13	5	8	0	0	17 September 2019	20 September 2019

=== Twenty20 Internationals ===
- Highest team total: 241/5 v. Kenya on 26 September 2025 at Harare Sports Club, Harare.
- Highest individual score: 134, Jan Frylinck v. Nigeria on 28 September 2025 at Harare Sports Club, Harare.
- Best individual bowling figures: 6/10, JJ Smit v. Uganda on 10 April 2022 at United Ground, Windhoek.

Most T20I runs for Namibia

Player	Runs	Average	Career span
Gerhard Erasmus	2,327	33.24	2019–2026
Jan Frylinck	1,518	27.10	2019–2026
JJ Smit	1,325	30.81	2019–2026
Niko Davin	969	29.36	2019–2025
Jan Nicol Loftie-Eaton	825	19.64	2021–2026

Most T20I wickets for Namibia

Player	Wickets	Average	Career span
Bernard Scholtz	85	21.44	2019–2026
JJ Smit	78	17.88	2019–2026
Gerhard Erasmus	70	16.41	2019–2026
Jan Frylinck	63	17.95	2019–2026
Ruben Trumpelmann	60	25.96	2021–2026

T20I record versus other nations

Records complete to T20I #4102. Last updated 4 September 2026.

Opponent	M	W	L	T	NR	First match	First win
Full members
Afghanistan	1	0	1	0	0	31 October 2021	
Australia	1	0	1	0	0	11 June 2024	
England	1	0	1	0	0	15 June 2024	
India	2	0	2	0	0	8 November 2021	
Ireland	2	1	1	0	0	2 November 2019	22 October 2021
New Zealand	1	0	1	0	0	5 November 2021	
Pakistan	2	0	2	0	0	2 November 2021	
South Africa	3	2	1	0	0	11 October 2025	11 October 2025
Sri Lanka	2	1	1	0	0	18 October 2021	16 October 2022
Zimbabwe	17	8	9	0	0	17 May 2022	19 May 2022
Associate Members
Bermuda	1	1	0	0	0	23 October 2019	23 October 2019
Botswana	5	5	0	0	0	22 May 2019	22 May 2019
Canada	3	3	0	0	0	19 March 2025	19 March 2025
Ghana	1	1	0	0	0	20 May 2019	20 May 2019
Hong Kong	2	2	0	0	0	19 June 2026	19 June 2026
Kenya	3	3	0	0	0	25 October 2019	25 October 2019
Malawi	1	1	0	0	0	30 September 2025	30 September 2025
Nepal	2	1	1	0	0	27 February 2024	27 February 2024
Netherlands	6	1	4	0	1	19 October 2019	20 October 2021
Nigeria	5	4	1	0	0	30 November 2023	30 November 2023
Oman	7	4	2	1	0	29 October 2019	29 October 2019
Papua New Guinea	3	1	2	0	0	20 October 2019	10 October 2021
Rwanda	1	1	0	0	0	25 November 2023	25 November 2023
Scotland	7	4	3	0	0	22 October 2019	27 October 2021
Singapore	1	1	0	0	0	26 October 2019	26 October 2019
Tanzania	3	3	0	0	0	28 November 2023	28 November 2023
Uganda	9	8	1	0	0	21 May 2019	21 May 2019
United Arab Emirates	4	1	3	0	0	5 October 2021	5 October 2021
United States	3	0	3	0	0	1 October 2024	

== Tournament history ==
Legend

- Champions
- Runners-up
- Third place/Semi-finals
- Hosts
- Q Qualified/Advanced to next stage
- DNQ Did not qualify
- ▲ Promoted
- Remained in the same division
- ▼ Relegated

=== Cricket World Cup ===
Cricket World Cup record								Qualification record				
Year	Round	Position	Pld	W	L	T	NR	Pld	W	L	T	NR
(England) 1975	Not an ICC member							Not an ICC member				
(England) 1979	Not an ICC member							Not an ICC member				
(England) (Wales) 1983	Not an ICC member							Not an ICC member				
(India) (Pakistan) 1987	Not an ICC member							Not an ICC member				
(Australia) (New Zealand) 1992	Not an ICC member							Not an ICC member				
(India) (Pakistan) (Sri Lanka) 1996	Did not qualify							7	4	3	0	0
(England) (Wales) (Scotland) (Republic of Ireland) (Netherlands) 1999	Did not qualify							6	2	4	0	0
(South Africa) (Zimbabwe) (Kenya) 2003	Pool stage	14/14	6	0	6	0	0	9	8	1	0	0
(Cricket West Indies) 2007	Did not qualify							7	3	4	0	0
(India) (Sri Lanka) (Bangladesh) 2011	Did not qualify							16	7	9	0	0
(Australia) (New Zealand) 2015	Did not qualify							27	9	18	0	0
(England) (Wales) 2019	Did not qualify							26	10	16	0	0
(India) 2023	Did not qualify							41	22	18	0	1
(South Africa) (Zimbabwe) (Namibia) 2027	To be determined							36*	15	18	0	3
Total	0 Titles	1/13	6	0	6	0	0	175	80	91	0	4

=== Cricket World Cup Qualifier ===
Cricket World Cup Qualifier records
Year	Round	Position	Pld	W	L	T	NR	Qual.
(England) 1979	Not an ICC member							
(England) 1982	Not an ICC member							
(England) 1986	Not an ICC member							
(Netherlands) 1990	Not an ICC member							
(Kenya) 1994	First round	11/20	7	4	3	0	0	DNQ
(Malaysia) 1997	First round	15/22	6	2	4	0	0	DNQ
(Canada) 2001	Runners-up	2/24	9	8	1	0	0	Q
(Ireland) 2005	Group stage	7/12	7	3	4	0	0	DNQ
(South Africa) 2009	Super Eights	8/12	10	3	7	0	0	DNQ
(New Zealand) 2014	Super Six	6/10	7	3	4	0	0	DNQ
(Zimbabwe) 2018	Did not qualify							
(Zimbabwe) 2023	Did not qualify							
(Namibia) (South Africa) 2027	To be determined							
Total	0 Titles	6/12	46	23	23	0	0	—N/a

=== CWC League 2 ===
Cricket World Cup League 2 record
Year	Round	Position	Pld	W	L	T	NR	P/R
2019–2023	League stage	4/7	36	19	16	0	1	Same position
2024–2026	League stage	5/8	36	15	18	0	3	Same position
Total	0 Titles	2/2	72	34	34	0	4	—N/a

=== Men's T20 World Cup ===
Men's T20 World Cup record								Qualification record				
Year	Round	Position	Pld	W	L	T	NR	Pld	W	L	T	NR
(South Africa) 2007	Not eligible; no ODI status							Not eligible; no ODI status				
(England) 2009	Not eligible; no ODI status							Not eligible; no ODI status				
(Cricket West Indies) 2010	Not eligible; no ODI status							Not eligible; no ODI status				
(Sri Lanka) 2012	Did not qualify							18	16	2	0	0
(Bangladesh) 2014	Did not qualify							9	4	5	0	0
(India) 2016	Did not qualify							13	7	5	0	1
(United Arab Emirates) (Oman) 2021	Super 12	10/16	8	3	5	0	0	20	13	5	0	2
(Australia) 2022	First round	13/16	3	1	2	0	0	Qualified directly				
(Cricket West Indies) (United States) 2024	Group stage	15/20	4	0	3	1	0	6	6	0	0	0
(India) (Sri Lanka) 2026	Group stage	19/20	4	0	4	0	0	5	4	1	0	0
(Australia) (New Zealand) 2028	To be determined							To be determined				
Total	0 Titles	4/10	19	4	14	1	0	71	50	18	0	3

=== T20 World Cup Qualifier ===
T20 World Cup Qualifier records
Year	Round	Position	Pld	W	L	T	NR	Qual.
(Ireland) 2008	Not eligible; no ODI status							
(United Arab Emirates) 2010	Not eligible; no ODI status							
(United Arab Emirates) 2012	Play-offs	3/16	9	7	2	0	0	DNQ
(United Arab Emirates) 2013	Play-offs	10/16	9	4	5	0	0	DNQ
(Ireland) (Scotland) 2015	Play-offs	7/16	8	3	4	0	1	DNQ
(United Arab Emirates) 2019	Semi-finals	4/14	9	5	4	0	0	Q
(Oman) / (Zimbabwe) 2022	Did not participate; qualified directly							
(To be determined) 2028	Qualified							
Total	0 Titles	5/8	35	19	15	0	1	—N/a

=== African Games ===
African Games record
Year	Round	Position	GP	W	L	T	NR
(Ghana) 2023	Runners-up	2/8	5	2	3	0	0
Total	0 Titles	2nd	5	2	3	0	0

=== Other global tournaments ===
CWC Qualifier Play-off (ODI)	ICC 6 Nations Challenge
2023: 3rd place (DNQ); 2026: Qualified	2000: Did not participate; 2002: 1st place; 2004: 3rd place
Intercontinental Cup	World Cricket League (LA/ODI/50 overs)
2004: First round; 2005: First round; 2006: First round; 2007–08: Runners-up; 2009–10 (Shield): Winners; 2011–13: 5th place; 2015–17: 8th place	2007 (Division Two): 3rd place; 2011 (Division Two): 2nd place; 2011–13 (Championship): 7th place; 2015 (Division Two): 2nd place; 2015–17 (Championship): 8th place; 2018 (Division Two): 4th place; 2019 (Division Two): Winners

=== Other regional tournaments ===
T20WC Africa Regional Final (T20I)	T20WC Africa Sub-regional Qualifiers (T20I)
2019: Winners (Q); 2022: Winners (Q); 2025: Runners-up (Q)	2012: 3rd place; 2013: 10th place; 2015: 7th place; 2019: 4th place

== Honours ==
=== Other ===
- African Games
  - Silver medal (1): 2023

== Current squad ==
Updated as on 21 February 2026

This lists all the active players who have played for Namibia in the past two year and the forms in which they have played, and any players (in italics) outside this criterion who have been selected in the team's most recent ODI or T20I squad.

Name	Age	Batting style	Bowling style	Forms	Last ODI	Last T20I
Batters
Niko Davin	28	Right-handed	Right-arm leg break	ODI, T20I	(Canada) 2025	(Canada) 2025
Louren Steenkamp	29	Right-handed	Right-arm off break	T20I	—N/a	(Pakistan) 2026
Jean-Pierre Kotze	32	Left-handed	—N/a	ODI, T20I	(Canada) 2025	(Canada) 2025
Malan Kruger	31	Right-handed	—N/a	ODI, T20I	(Scotland) 2025	(India) 2026
Dylan Leicher	22	Right-handed	Right-arm medium	T20I	(Canada) 2025	(United States) 2026
Michael van Lingen	29	Left-handed	Left-arm medium	ODI, T20I	(United Arab Emirates) 2024	(England) 2024
All-rounders
Gerhard Erasmus	31	Right-handed	Right-arm off break	ODI (C), T20I (C)	(Scotland) 2025	(Pakistan) 2026
Shaun Fouché	26	Right-handed	Right-arm medium	ODI	(Netherlands) 2025	(United States) 2024
Alexander Volschenk	21	Right-handed	Right-arm medium	T20I	—N/a	(Pakistan) 2026
Jan Frylinck	32	Left-handed	Left-arm fast-medium	ODI, T20I	(Scotland) 2025	(Pakistan) 2026
Jan Nicol Loftie-Eaton	25	Left-handed	Right-arm leg break	ODI, T20I	(Scotland) 2025	(Pakistan) 2026
JJ Smit	31	Right-handed	Left-arm medium-fast	ODI (VC), T20I (VC)	(Scotland) 2025	(Pakistan) 2026
Wicket-keeper
Zane Green	30	Left-handed	—N/a	ODI & T20I	(Scotland) 2025	(Pakistan) 2026
Pace bowlers
Jack Brassell	21	Right-handed	Right-arm medium	ODI, T20I	(Scotland) 2025	(Pakistan) 2026
Tangeni Lungameni	34	Left-handed	Left-arm medium	ODI, T20I	(Canada) 2025	(Canada) 2025
Ben Shikongo	26	Right-handed	Right-arm medium-fast	ODI, T20I	(Scotland) 2025	(India) 2026
Simon Shikongo		Right-handed	Right-arm medium-fast	T20I	—N/a	(Oman) 2024
Ruben Trumpelmann	28	Right-handed	Left-arm fast-medium	ODI, T20I	(Scotland) 2025	(Pakistan) 2026
Jan-Izak de Villiers	25	Right-handed	Right-arm medium	ODI, T20I	(Canada) 2025	(Tanzania) 2025
Max Heingo		Right-handed	Right-arm medium	T20I	—N/a	(United States) 2026
Spin bowlers
Bernard Scholtz	36	Right-handed	Slow left-arm orthodox	ODI, T20I	(Scotland) 2025	(Pakistan) 2026
Peter-Daniel Blignaut	21	Right-handed	Slow left-arm orthodox	T20I, ODI	(United States) 2024	(Uganda) 2024

== Coaching staff ==
Position	Name
Head coach	Craig Williams
Batting coach	Danie Keulder
Bowling coach	Burton van Rooi
Fielding coach	Sarel Burger

== See also ==
- Cricket in Namibia
- List of Namibia ODI cricketers
- List of Namibia Twenty20 International cricketers
- List of Namibian first-class cricketers
- Namibia national under-19 cricket team
- Namibia women's national cricket team
