= Botswana cricket team in Namibia in 2019 =

Botswanan cricket team in Namibia in 2019
| | Namibia | Botswana |
- Dates: 18 – 24 August 2019
| Captains | Gerhard Erasmus | Karabo Motlhanka |

Twenty20 International series
- Results: Namibia won the 4-match series 4–0
| Most runs | Stephan Baard (166) | Karabo Motlhanka (87) |
| Most wickets | Gerhard Erasmus (7) | Dhruv Maisuria (8) |

The Botswana cricket team toured Namibia in August 2019 to play a four-match Twenty20 International (T20I) series. The series was the first bilateral T20I series hosted in the country and provided Namibia with preparation for the 2019 ICC T20 World Cup Qualifier. The teams also played two friendly 50-over matches either side of the T20I series.

== Squads ==
| Namibia | Botswana |
|---|---|
| Gerhard Erasmus (c); Stephan Baard; Karl Birkenstock; Niko Davin; Jan Frylinck; Zane Green (wk); Zhivago Groenewald; Jean-Pierre Kotze; Lo-handre Louwrens; Tangeni Lungameni; Bernard Scholtz; Danie van Schoor; Ben Shikongo; JJ Smit; Craig Williams; Pikky Ya France | Karabo Motlhanka (c) (wk); Dimpho Kegasitswe; Boemo Khumalo; Dhruv Maisuria; Valentine Mbazo; Mmoloki Mooketsi; James Moses; Reginald Nehonde; Tharindu Perera; Katlo Piet; Hemal Pragji; Adithiya Rangaswamy; Ameer Saiyed; Phemelo Silas |

== 50-over series ==
=== 1st 50-over match ===
18 August 2019
09:30
Scorecard

| Botswana; 92 (35.1 overs) | v | Namibia; 93/3 (21.2 overs) |
| Reginald Nehonde 41 (72); Tangeni Lungameni 3/11 (4.1 overs) | | Stephan Baard 34 (52); Mmoloki Mooketsi 2/16 (5 overs) |

Namibia won by 7 wickets
United Ground, Windhoek

- Botswana won the toss and elected to bat.

=== 2nd 50-over match ===
24 August 2019
09:30

| Namibia | v | Botswana |

Namibia won
United Ground, Windhoek

- No scores were published for this match.

== T20I series ==
=== 1st T20I ===
19 August 2019
14:00
Scorecard

| Namibia; 193/4 (20 overs) | v | Botswana; 100/7 (20 overs) |
| Craig Williams 68* (31); Dhruv Maisuria 3/23 (4 overs) | | Valentine Mbazo 27* (27); Tangeni Lungameni 2/16 (3 overs) |

Namibia won by 93 runs
United Ground, Windhoek
Umpires: Marthinus Louw (Nam) and Claude Thorburn (Nam)
Player of the match: Craig Williams (Nam)

- Botswana won the toss and elected to field.
- Ben Shikongo, Craig Williams, Pikky Ya France (Nam), Dimpho Kegasitswe, Boemo Khumalo, Valentine Mbazo, Hemal Pragji, Ameer Saiyed and Phemelo Silas (Bot) all made their T20I debuts.

=== 2nd T20I ===
20 August 2019
14:00
Scorecard

| Namibia; 240/3 (20 overs) | v | Botswana; 116/2 (20 overs) |
| Jean-Pierre Kotze 101* (43); Adithiya Rangaswamy 1/5 (1 over) | | Karabo Motlhanka 59 (55); Ben Shikongo 1/20 (4 overs) |

Namibia won by 124 runs
United Ground, Windhoek
Umpires: Andrew Louw (Nam) and Claus Schumacher (Nam)
Player of the match: Jean-Pierre Kotze (Nam)

- Botswana won the toss and elected to field.
- Jean-Pierre Kotze (Nam) made his T20I debut. He also became the first batsman for Namibia to score a century in T20Is.

=== 3rd T20I ===
22 August 2019
14:00
Scorecard

| Namibia; 174/8 (20 overs) | v | Botswana; 96 (18.1 overs) |
| Stephan Baard 92 (58); Dhruv Maisuria 4/28 (4 overs) | | Tharindu Perera 24 (18); Craig Williams 3/9 (2 overs) |

Namibia won by 78 runs
United Ground, Windhoek
Umpires: Marthinus Louw (Nam) and Claude Thorburn (Nam)
Player of the match: Stephan Baard (Nam)

- Namibia won the toss and elected to bat.

=== 4th T20I ===
23 August 2019
10:00
Scorecard

| Botswana; 85/8 (20 overs) | v | Namibia; 86/2 (11.1 overs) |
| Tharindu Perera 30 (32); Ben Shikongo 2/4 (2 overs) | | Gerhard Erasmus 46* (33); Mmoloki Mooketsi 1/22 (4 overs) |

Namibia won by 8 wickets
United Ground, Windhoek
Umpires: Marthinus Louw (Nam) and Jeff Luck (Nam)
Player of the match: Gerhard Erasmus (Nam)

- Botswana won the toss and elected to bat.
- Lo-handre Louwrens (Nam) made his T20I debut.
