= 2022 Namibia Tri-Nation Series (November) =

Cricket tournament

- Part of 2019–2023 ICC Cricket World Cup League 2
- Date: 19–26 November 2022
- Location: Namibia
- Player of the series: (Papua New Guinea) Assad Vala
Teams
Namibia	Papua New Guinea	United States
Captains
Gerhard Erasmus	Assad Vala	Monank Patel
Most runs
Gerhard Erasmus (152)	Assad Vala (226)	Monank Patel (153)
Most wickets
Tangeni Lungameni (9) Ruben Trumpelmann (9)	Assad Vala (4)	Ian Holland (8); Jasdeep Singh (8)

The 2022 Namibia Tri-Nation Series was the 17th round of the 2019–2023 ICC Cricket World Cup League 2 cricket tournament, took place in Namibia in November 2022. It was a tri-nation series between Namibia, Papua New Guinea and the United States cricket teams, with the matches played as One Day International (ODI) fixtures. The ICC Cricket World Cup League 2 formed part of the qualification pathway to the 2023 Cricket World Cup.

Originally the series was scheduled to take place in September 2020. However, the series was postponed in July 2020 due to the COVID-19 pandemic. In December 2020, the International Cricket Council (ICC) announced the rescheduled dates for the series.

Namibia and the United States each claimed three wins from four games, while Papua New Guinea continued their struggles in the Cricket World Cup League 2 by losing all four of their matches in Windhoek. In the fourth match of the series, Namibia's Tangeni Lungameni took six wickets for thirty-two runs in a victory against Papua New Guinea, setting the best ODI bowling figures for his country in an ODI.

== Squads ==
Namibia	Papua New Guinea	United States
Gerhard Erasmus (c); JJ Smit (vc); Karl Birkenstock; Jan Frylinck; Zane Green (wk); Divan la Cock; Jan Nicol Loftie-Eaton (wk); Lo-handre Louwrens (wk); Tangeni Lungameni; Bernard Scholtz; Ben Shikongo; Ruben Trumpelmann; Michael van Lingen; Pikky Ya France	Assad Vala (c); Charles Amini; Sese Bau; Kiplin Doriga (wk); Riley Hekure; Hiri Hiri; Semo Kamea; Kabua Morea; Alei Nao; Lega Siaka; Chad Soper; Gaudi Toka; Tony Ura; Norman Vanua	Monank Patel (c, wk); Aaron Jones (vc); Saideep Ganesh; Ian Holland; Shayan Jahangir (wk); Nosthush Kenjige; Sushant Modani; Saurabh Netravalkar; Nisarg Patel; Usman Rafiq; Gajanand Singh; Jasdeep Singh; Cameron Stevenson; Steven Taylor

== Fixtures ==
=== 1st ODI ===
19 November 2022
09:30
Scorecard

Papua New Guinea; 107 (38.5 overs)	v	Namibia; 108/2 (15.1 overs)
Assad Vala 44 (90); Tangeni Lungameni 2/9 (6 overs)		Lo-handre Louwrens 36 (24); Charles Amini 1/24 (3 overs)

Namibia won by 8 wickets
Wanderers Cricket Ground, Windhoek
Umpires: Bongani Jele (SA) and Claude Thorburn (Nam)
Player of the match: Tangeni Lungameni (Nam)

- Namibia won the toss and elected to field.

=== 2nd ODI ===
20 November 2022
09:30
Scorecard

United States; 244/8 (50 overs)	v	Namibia; 173 (43.4 overs)
Gajanand Singh 66 (65); Bernard Scholtz 3/31 (9 overs)		Gerhard Erasmus 27 (50); Saurabh Netravalkar 2/13 (6.4 overs)

United States won by 71 runs
Wanderers Cricket Ground, Windhoek
Umpires: Bongani Jele (SA) and Claus Schumacher (Nam)
Player of the match: Gajanand Singh (USA)

- Namibia won the toss and elected to field.
- Shayan Jahangir (USA) made his ODI debut.

=== 3rd ODI ===
22 November 2022
09:30
Scorecard

Papua New Guinea; 149 (47.5 overs)	v	United States; 152/4 (30.3 overs)
Assad Vala 29 (35); Nosthush Kenjige 2/18 (10 overs)		Monank Patel 50 (65); Assad Vala 2/25 (7 overs)

United States won by 6 wickets
Wanderers Cricket Ground, Windhoek
Umpires: Claus Schumacher (Nam) and Claude Thorburn (Nam)
Player of the match: Monank Patel (USA)

- United States won the toss and elected to field.

=== 4th ODI ===
23 November 2022
10:00
Scorecard

Papua New Guinea; 236 (49.2 overs)	v	Namibia; 241/7 (48 overs)
Assad Vala 59 (53); Tangeni Lungameni 6/42 (9 overs)		Gerhard Erasmus 71 (96); Norman Vanua 2/44 (7 overs)

Namibia won by 3 wickets
Wanderers Cricket Ground, Windhoek
Umpires: Bongani Jele (SA) and Claude Thorburn (Nam)
Player of the match: Tangeni Lungameni (Nam)

- Papua New Guinea won the toss and elected to bat.

=== 5th ODI ===
25 November 2022
10:00
Scorecard

United States; 266/7 (50 overs)	v	Papua New Guinea; 231 (48.2 overs)
Monank Patel 66 (69); Kabua Morea 2/49 (9 overs)		Assad Vala 94 (97); Jasdeep Singh 4/32 (9.2 overs)

United States won by 35 runs
Wanderers Cricket Ground, Windhoek
Umpires: Andrew Louw (Nam) and Claus Schumacher (Nam)
Player of the match: Steven Taylor (USA)

- United States won the toss and elected to bat.

=== 6th ODI ===
26 November 2022
10:00
Scorecard

United States; 211/7 (50 overs)	v	Namibia; 212/4 (44.4 overs)
Ian Holland 40 (49); Bernard Scholtz 3/26 (10 overs)		Divan la Cock 59 (84); Ian Holland 2/36 (7 overs)

Namibia won by 6 wickets
Wanderers Cricket Ground, Windhoek
Umpires: Bongani Jele (SA) and Andrew Louw (Nam)
Player of the match: Jan Nicol Loftie-Eaton (Nam)

- Namibia won the toss and elected to field.
