= 2022 Namibia Tri-Nation Series (December) =

Cricket tournament

- Part of 2019–2023 ICC Cricket World Cup League 2
- Date: 1–8 December 2022
- Location: Namibia
- Player of the series: (Scotland) Brandon McMullen
Teams
| Namibia | Nepal | Scotland |
Captains
| Gerhard Erasmus | Rohit Paudel | Richie Berrington |
Most runs
| Gerhard Erasmus (169) | Gyanendra Malla (139) | Michael van Lingen (131) |
Most wickets
| Tangeni Lungameni (8) | Lalit Rajbanshi (6) | Brandon McMullen (8) |

The 2022 Namibia Tri-Nation Series was the 18th round of the 2019–2023 ICC Cricket World Cup League 2 cricket tournament which took place in Namibia in December 2022. It was a tri-nation series between Namibia, Nepal and the Scotland cricket teams, with the matches played as One Day International (ODI) fixtures. The ICC Cricket World Cup League 2 formed part of the qualification pathway to the 2023 Cricket World Cup.

Originally the series was scheduled to take place in April 2020. However, on 24 March 2020, the International Cricket Council (ICC) confirmed that all ICC qualifying events scheduled to take place before 30 June 2020 had been postponed due to the COVID-19 pandemic. In December 2020, the ICC announced the rescheduled dates for the series.

== Squads ==
| Namibia | Nepal | Scotland |
|---|---|---|
| Gerhard Erasmus (c); Karl Birkenstock; ~~Jan Frylinck~~; Zane Green (wk); Divan la Cock; Jan Nicol Loftie-Eaton (wk); Lo-handre Louwrens (wk); Tangeni Lungameni; Bernard Scholtz; Ben Shikongo; JJ Smit; Ruben Trumpelmann; Michael van Lingen; Pikky Ya France | Rohit Paudel (c); Dipendra Singh Airee; Kushal Bhurtel; Sagar Dhakal; Gulshan Jha; Sompal Kami; Karan KC; Gyanendra Malla; Lalit Rajbanshi; Harishankar Sah; Arjun Saud (wk); Aarif Sheikh; Aasif Sheikh (wk); Nandan Yadav | Richie Berrington (c); Matthew Cross (vc, wk); Kyle Coetzer; Chris Greaves; Michael Leask; Tomas Mackintosh; Christopher McBride; Brandon McMullen; George Munsey; Adrian Neill; Safyaan Sharif; Chris Sole; Hamza Tahir; Mark Watt |

Jan Frylinck was ruled out of Namibia's squad due to an ankle injury.

== Fixtures ==
=== 1st ODI ===
1 December 2022
10:00
Scorecard

| Namibia; 211/9 (50 overs) | v | Scotland; 213/6 (42.1 overs) |
| Gerhard Erasmus 96* (130); Safyaan Sharif 3/33 (10 overs) | | Kyle Coetzer 54 (44); Jan Nicol Loftie-Eaton 2/32 (4 overs) |

Scotland won by 4 wickets
United Ground, Windhoek
Umpires: Shaun George (SA) and Claus Schumacher (Nam)
Player of the match: Kyle Coetzer (Sco)

- Scotland won the toss and elected to field.
- Brandon McMullen (Sco) made his ODI debut.

=== 2nd ODI ===
2 December 2022
10:00
Scorecard

| Nepal; 197 (49.5 overs) | v | Namibia; 4/0 (0.4 overs) |
| Gyanendra Malla 75 (94); Tangeni Lungameni 3/42 (10 overs) | | Divan la Cock 3* (3) |

No result
United Ground, Windhoek
Umpires: Shaun George (SA) and Claus Schumacher (Nam)

- Namibia won the toss and elected to field.
- No further play was possible due to rain.

=== 3rd ODI ===
4 December 2022
10:00
Scorecard

| Nepal; 137 (40.1 overs) | v | Scotland; 143/7 (32.1 overs) |
| Gulsan Jha 29 (29); Chris Sole 3/12 (7 overs) | | Christopher McBride 43 (47); Gulsan Jha 2/19 (4 overs) |

Scotland won by 3 wickets
United Ground, Windhoek
Umpires: Andrew Louw (Nam) and Claude Thorburn (Nam)
Player of the match: Chris Sole (Sco)

- Scotland won the toss and elected to field.

=== 4th ODI ===
5 December 2022
10:00
Scorecard

| Scotland; 208 (50 overs) | v | Namibia; 210/7 (44 overs) |
| Brandon McMullen 56 (70); Ruben Trumpelmann 4/37 (10 overs) | | Jan Nicol Loftie-Eaton 67* (96); Mark Watt 3/28 (9 overs) |

Namibia won by 3 wickets
United Ground, Windhoek
Umpires: Shaun George (SA) and Claude Thorburn (Nam)
Player of the match: Pikky Ya France (Nam)

- Namibia won the toss and elected to field.

=== 5th ODI ===
7 December 2022
10:00
Scorecard

| Namibia; 275/7 (50 overs) | v | Nepal; 189 (46.5 overs) |
| Michael van Lingen 119 (111); Lalit Rajbanshi 4/36 (10 overs) | | Rohit Paudel 44 (61); JJ Smit 2/18 (8 overs) |

Namibia won by 86 runs
United Ground, Windhoek
Umpires: Shaun George (SA) and Andrew Louw (Nam)
Player of the match: Michael van Lingen (Nam)

- Nepal won the toss and elected to field.

=== 6th ODI ===
8 December 2022
10:00
Scorecard

| Nepal; 119 (35.3 overs) | v | Scotland; 121/2 (17 overs) |
| Rohit Paudel 47 (57); Safyaan Sharif 2/20 (7 overs) | | Christopher McBride 46* (40); Dipendra Singh Airee 1/5 (1 over) |

Scotland won by 8 wickets
United Ground, Windhoek
Umpires: Andrew Louw (Nam) and Claude Thorburn (Nam)
Player of the match: Christopher McBride (Sco)

- Nepal won the toss and elected to bat.
