= 2022 Papua New Guinea Tri-Nation Series (September) =

Cricket tournament

- Part of 2019–2023 ICC Cricket World Cup League 2
- Date: 11–21 September 2022
- Location: Papua New Guinea
- Player of the series: (Namibia) Gerhard Erasmus
Teams
Namibia	Papua New Guinea	United States
Captains
Gerhard Erasmus	Assad Vala	Monank Patel
Most runs
Gerhard Erasmus (231)	Assad Vala (116)	Gajanand Singh (139)
Most wickets
Jan Frylinck (7) Bernard Scholtz (7)	Semo Kamea (5); Chad Soper (5); Norman Vanua (5)	Saurabh Netravalkar (8); Steven Taylor (8)

The 2022 Papua New Guinea Tri-Nation Series was the 16th round of the 2019–2023 ICC Cricket World Cup League 2 cricket tournament and was played in Papua New Guinea in September 2022. It was a tri-nation series between Namibia, Papua New Guinea and the United States cricket teams, with the matches played as One Day International (ODI) fixtures. The ICC Cricket World Cup League 2 formed part of the qualification pathway to the 2023 Cricket World Cup. Originally scheduled to take place in May 2021, the series was postponed on 12 February 2021 due to the COVID-19 pandemic.

== Squads ==
Namibia	Papua New Guinea	United States
Gerhard Erasmus (c); JJ Smit (vc); Stephan Baard; Jan Frylinck; Zane Green (wk); Divan la Cock; Jan Nicol Loftie-Eaton; Lo-handre Louwrens (wk); Tangeni Lungameni; Bernard Scholtz; Ben Shikongo; Ruben Trumpelmann; Michael van Lingen; Pikky Ya France	Assad Vala (c); Charles Amini (wk); Simon Atai (wk); Dogodo Bau; Sese Bau; Riley Hekure; Hiri Hiri; Semo Kamea; Jason Kila; Kabua Morea; Alei Nao; Nosaina Pokana; Damien Ravu; Lega Siaka; Chad Soper; Tony Ura; Norman Vanua	Monank Patel (c); Aaron Jones (vc); Rahul Jariwala; Nosthush Kenjige; Jaskaran Malhotra (wk); Yasir Mohammad; Saiteja Mukkamalla; Saurabh Netravalkar; Nisarg Patel; Kyle Phillip; Gajanand Singh; Jasdeep Singh; Cameron Stevenson; Steven Taylor

== Fixtures ==
=== 1st ODI ===
11 September 2022
10:00
Scorecard

United States; 205 (47 overs)	v	Papua New Guinea; 205 (49.5 overs)
Gajanand Singh 58 (90); Semo Kamea 3/36 (7 overs)		Sese Bau 70 (96); Nosthush Kenjige 2/15 (6.5 overs)

Match tied
Amini Park, Port Moresby
Umpires: Donovan Koch (Aus) and Lakani Oala (PNG)
Player of the match: Sese Bau (PNG)

- Papua New Guinea won the toss and elected to field.

=== 2nd ODI ===
13 September 2022
10:00
Scorecard

Papua New Guinea; 211/9 (50 overs)	v	United States; 185 (47.2 overs)
Assad Vala 64 (89); Steven Taylor 3/34 (10 overs)		Saiteja Mukkamalla 46 (81); Assad Vala 3/17 (6.2 overs)

Papua New Guinea won by 26 runs
Amini Park, Port Moresby
Umpires: Alu Kapa (PNG) and Donovan Koch (Aus)
Player of the match: Assad Vala (PNG)

- United States won the toss and elected to field.

=== 3rd ODI ===
15 September 2022
10:00
Scorecard

Namibia; 176 (48.3 overs)	v	United States; 97 (31.5 overs)
Divan la Cock 48 (66); Saurabh Netravalkar 2/29 (10 overs)		Aaron Jones 45 (76); Bernard Scholtz 3/5 (8.5 overs)

Namibia won by 79 runs
Amini Park, Port Moresby
Umpires: Alu Kapa (PNG) and Lakani Oala (PNG)
Player of the match: Bernard Scholtz (Nam)

- Namibia won the toss and elected to bat.

=== 4th ODI ===
17 September 2022
10:00
Scorecard

Namibia; 254/5 (50 overs)	v	United States; 186/7 (50 overs)
Gerhard Erasmus 87 (72); Saurabh Netravalkar 3/55 (10 overs)		Gajanand Singh 32 (51); Bernard Scholtz 3/19 (10 overs)

Namibia won by 68 runs
Amini Park, Port Moresby
Umpires: Alu Kapa (PNG) and Lakani Oala (PNG)
Player of the match: Gerhard Erasmus (Nam)

- United States won the toss and elected to field.

=== 5th ODI ===
20 September 2022
10:00
Scorecard

Namibia; 284/4 (50 overs)	v	Papua New Guinea; 117 (42.4 overs)
Michael van Lingen 119* (107); Norman Vanua 3/47 (9 overs)		Norman Vanua 38 (68); Bernard Scholtz 3/21 (10 overs)

Namibia won by 167 runs
Amini Park, Port Moresby
Umpires: Donovan Koch (Aus) and Lakani Oala (PNG)
Player of the match: Michael van Lingen (Nam)

- Namibia won the toss and elected to bat.

=== 6th ODI ===
21 September 2022
10:00
Scorecard

Namibia; 214/8 (50 overs)	v	Papua New Guinea; 153 (43.1 overs)
Gerhard Erasmus 49 (77); Chad Soper 2/27 (7 overs)		Lega Siaka 38 (61); Gerhard Erasmus 3/31 (10 overs)

Namibia won by 61 runs
Amini Park, Port Moresby
Umpires: Alu Kapa (PNG) and Donovan Koch (Aus)
Player of the match: Gerhard Erasmus (Nam)

- Namibia won the toss and elected to bat.
