= 2022 Namibia T20 Tri-Nation Series =

International cricket tournament

- Date: 29 June – 3 July 2022
- Location: Namibia
- Result: Namibia won the tournament
Teams
Jersey	Namibia	United States
Captains
Charles Perchard (Note: Dominic Blampied captained Jersey for the 1st, 4th and 6th matches.)	Gerhard Erasmus (Note: JJ Smit captained Namibia for the 4th match.)	Monank Patel
Most runs
Asa Tribe (143)	Divan la Cock (143)	Monank Patel (217)
Most wickets
Daniel Birrell (5)	Ruben Trumpelmann (8)	Saurabh Netravalkar (4)

The 2022 Namibia T20 Tri-Nation Series was a Twenty20 cricket tournament that took place in Namibia in late June and early July 2022. The participating teams were the hosts Namibia, along with Jersey and United States, with the visiting teams both using the event as preparation for the 2022 ICC Men's T20 World Cup Global Qualifier B. The three associations agreed to play the matches without official Twenty20 International status.

== Squads ==
Jersey	Namibia	United States
Charles Perchard (c); Dominic Blampied (vc); Daniel Birrell; Harrison Carlyon; Jake Dunford (wk); Nick Greenwood; Jonty Jenner; Elliot Miles; Rhys Palmer; Ben Stevens; Julius Sumerauer; Asa Tribe; Zak Tribe; Benjamin Ward	Gerhard Erasmus (c); JJ Smit (vc); Stephan Baard; Shaun Fouché; Jan Frylinck; Zane Green (wk); Malan Kruger; Divan la Cock; Jan Nicol Loftie-Eaton (wk); Lo-handre Louwrens; Tangeni Lungameni; Mauritius Ngupita; Bernard Scholtz; Ben Shikongo; Ruben Trumpelmann; David Wiese; Craig Williams; Pikky Ya France	Monank Patel (c, wk); Aaron Jones (vc); Marty Kain; Ali Khan; Jaskaran Malhotra; Sushant Modani; Yasir Mohammad; Saurabh Netravalkar; Nisarg Patel; Gajanand Singh; Cameron Stevenson; Steven Taylor; Rusty Theron; Vatsal Vaghela

== Points table ==
Pos	Team	Pld	W	L	NR	Pts	NRR
1	Namibia	4	4	0	0	8	1.596
2	United States	4	2	2	0	4	0.552
3	Jersey	4	0	4	0	0	−2.130

Source: ESPN Cricinfo

== Fixtures ==
29 June 2022
10:00
Scorecard

Namibia; 196/5 (20 overs)	v	Jersey; 131/9 (20 overs)
David Wiese 55* (21); Daniel Birrell 2/35 (4 overs)		Asa Tribe 72* (57); Ruben Trumpelmann 3/31 (4 overs)

Namibia won by 65 runs
United Cricket Club Ground, Windhoek
Umpires: Esau Heynes (Nam) and Andre Maasz (Nam)
Player of the match: David Wiese (Nam)

- Jersey won the toss and elected to field.

30 June 2022
10:00
Scorecard

United States; 194/5 (20 overs)	v	Namibia; 197/4 (19 overs)
Monank Patel 50 (30); Jan Frylinck 2/32 (3 overs)		Gerhard Erasmus 72* (34); Steven Taylor 1/15 (2 overs)

Namibia won by 6 wickets
United Cricket Club Ground, Windhoek
Umpires: Esau Heynes (Nam) and Ewoud Lassen (Nam)
Player of the match: Gerhard Erasmus (Nam)

- Namibia won the toss and elected to field.

1 July 2022
10:00
Scorecard

United States; 136 (19.1 overs)	v	Namibia; 137/1 (16 overs)
Monank Patel 96* (58); Jan Frylinck 3/42 (4 overs)		Divan la Cock 80* (48); Saurabh Netravalkar 1/27 (3 overs)

Namibia won by 9 wickets
United Cricket Club Ground, Windhoek
Umpires: Andrew Louw (Nam) and Andre Maasz (Nam)
Player of the match: Divan la Cock (Nam)

- Namibia won the toss and elected to field.

1 July 2022
14:00
Scorecard

Jersey; 167/8 (20 overs)	v	Namibia; 169/7 (19 overs)
Asa Tribe 67 (50); Tangeni Lungameni 3/20 (3 overs)		Stephen Baard 41 (32); Elliot Miles 2/26 (4 overs)

Namibia won by 3 wickets
United Cricket Club Ground, Windhoek
Umpires: Esau Heynes (Nam) and Andrew Louw (Nam)
Player of the match: Ruben Trumpelmann (Nam)

- Jersey won the toss and elected to bat.

2 July 2022
10:00
Scorecard

United States; 190/5 (20 overs)	v	Jersey; 140/8 (20 overs)
Gajanand Singh 57 (28); Daniel Birrell 2/41 (4 overs)		Benjamin Ward 60 (39); Saurabh Netravalkar 2/20 (4 overs)

United States won by 50 runs
United Cricket Club Ground, Windhoek
Umpires: Ewoud Lassen (Nam) and Claus Schumacher (Nam)
Player of the match: Gajanand Singh (USA)

- Jersey won the toss and elected to field.

3 July 2022
10:00
Scorecard

Jersey; 172/6 (20 overs)	v	United States; 175/3 (15.5 overs)
Ben Stevens 98* (50); Rusty Theron 3/14 (2 overs)		Aaron Jones 68 (33); Elliot Miles 1/18 (3 overs)

United States won by 7 wickets
United Cricket Club Ground, Windhoek
Umpires: Ewoud Lassen (Nam) and Claus Schumacher (Nam)
Player of the match: Aaron Jones (USA)

- United States won the toss and elected to field.
