= 2019 United States Tri-Nation Series =

Cricket series

- Part of 2019–2023 ICC Cricket World Cup League 2
- Date: 13–23 September 2019
- Location: United States
Teams
Namibia	Papua New Guinea	United States
Captains
Gerhard Erasmus	Assad Vala	Saurabh Netravalkar
Most runs
Jean-Pierre Kotze (221)	Assad Vala (228)	Aaron Jones (131); Monank Patel (131)
Most wickets
Zhivago Groenewald (11)	Nosaina Pokana (11)	Karima Gore (9)

The 2019 United States Tri-Nation Series was the second round of the 2019–2023 ICC Cricket World Cup League 2 cricket tournament and took place in the United States in September 2019. It was a tri-nation series featuring Namibia, Papua New Guinea and the United States cricket teams, with the matches played as One Day International (ODI) fixtures. The ICC Cricket World Cup League 2 formed part of the qualification pathway to the 2023 Cricket World Cup. It was the first ODI series to be played in the USA.

Originally, the Church Street Park cricket ground, in Morrisville, was named as the host venue by the International Cricket Council. In July 2019, it was announced that either a new venue in Morgan Hill, California or the Leo Magnus Cricket Complex in Woodley Park in Los Angeles would host the tournament. However, the Central Broward Regional Park in Lauderhill, Florida was eventually chosen as the host venue.

The first fixture of the series saw the United States beat Papua New Guinea by five runs via the DLS method in a rain-affected match. This was the first-ever win for the United States in an ODI match.

== Squads ==
Namibia	Papua New Guinea	United States
Gerhard Erasmus (c); Jan Frylinck (vc); Stephan Baard; Karl Birkenstock; Zane Green; Zhivago Groenewald; Jean-Pierre Kotze; Tangeni Lungameni; Bernard Scholtz; Ben Shikongo; JJ Smit; Christi Viljoen; Craig Williams; Pikky Ya France	Assad Vala (c); Charles Amini; Simon Atai; Kiplin Doriga (wk); Riley Hekure; Hiri Hiri; Jason Kila; Alei Nao; Nosaina Pokana; Lega Siaka; Chad Soper; Gaudi Toka; Tony Ura; Norman Vanua	Saurabh Netravalkar (c); Steven Taylor (vc); Karima Gore; Elmore Hutchinson; Aaron Jones; Nosthush Kenjige; Jaskaran Malhotra; Xavier Marshall; Monank Patel; Nisarg Patel; Sagar Patel; Timil Patel; Jasdeep Singh; Rusty Theron

== Fixtures ==
=== 1st ODI ===
13 September 2019
09:45
Scorecard

United States; 251/9 (50 overs)	v	Papua New Guinea; 159/6 (23 overs)
Aaron Jones 77 (117); Nosaina Pokana 3/40 (10 overs); Jason Kila 3/40 (10 overs)		Charles Amini 53 (34); Karima Gore 3/25 (5 overs)

United States won by 5 runs (DLS method)
Central Broward Regional Park, Lauderhill
Umpires: Sameer Bandekar (USA) and Jacqueline Williams (WI)
Player of the match: Aaron Jones (USA)

- United States won the toss and elected to bat.
- Papua New Guinea were set a revised target of 165 runs from 23 overs due to rain.
- Elmore Hutchinson and Nisarg Patel (USA) both made their ODI debuts.
- Rusty Theron also made his ODI debut for the United States after previously playing 4 ODIs for South Africa, becoming the 13th cricketer to represent two international teams in ODIs.

=== 2nd ODI ===
17 September 2019
09:45
Scorecard

Namibia; 121 (46 overs)	v	United States; 122/5 (31.2 overs)
Zane Green 36 (75); Steven Taylor 4/23 (10 overs)		Steven Taylor 43 (58); Zhivago Groenewald 3/28 (9 overs)

United States won by 5 wickets
Central Broward Regional Park, Lauderhill
Umpires: Jermaine Lindo (USA) and Jacqueline Williams (WI)
Player of the match: Steven Taylor (USA)

- Namibia won the toss and elected to bat.
- Zhivago Groenewald (Nam) made his ODI debut.

=== 3rd ODI ===
19 September 2019
09:45
Scorecard

United States; 177 (48.1 overs)	v	Papua New Guinea; 115 (38.1 overs)
Monank Patel 66 (99); Jason Kila 3/27 (9.1 overs)		Assad Vala 38 (49); Karima Gore 4/21 (10 overs)

United States won by 62 runs
Central Broward Regional Park, Lauderhill
Umpires: Vijaya Mallela (USA) and Jacqueline Williams (WI)
Player of the match: Karima Gore (USA)

- United States won the toss and elected to bat.

=== 4th ODI ===
20 September 2019
09:45
Scorecard

Namibia; 287/8 (49 overs)	v	United States; 142 (37 overs)
Jean-Pierre Kotze 136 (109); Jasdeep Singh 4/51 (8 overs)		Aaron Jones 44 (76); Zhivago Groenewald 5/20 (8 overs)

Namibia won by 139 runs (DLS method)
Central Broward Regional Park, Lauderhill
Umpires: Jermaine Lindo (USA) and Jacqueline Williams (WI)
Player of the match: Jean-Pierre Kotze (Nam)

- United States won the toss and elected to field.
- United States were set a revised target of 282 runs from 47 overs due to rain.
- Jean-Pierre Kotze became the first batsman for Namibia to score a century in ODIs.
- Zhivago Groenewald (Nam) took his first five-wicket haul in ODIs.

=== 5th ODI ===
22 September 2019
09:45
Scorecard

Papua New Guinea; 219/8 (50 overs)	v	Namibia; 222/6 (48.2 overs)
Charles Amini 44 (61); Zhivago Groenewald 3/46 (9 overs)		Gerhard Erasmus 88 (100); Nosaina Pokana 2/30 (8 overs)

Namibia won by 4 wickets
Central Broward Regional Park, Lauderhill
Umpires: Sameer Bandekar (USA) and Jermaine Lindo (USA)
Player of the match: Gerhard Erasmus (Nam)

- Papua New Guinea won the toss and elected to bat.

=== 6th ODI ===
23 September 2019
09:45
Scorecard

Namibia; 260/9 (50 overs)	v	Papua New Guinea; 233 (47.3 overs)
Stephan Baard 73 (97); Nosaina Pokana 3/32 (7 overs)		Assad Vala 104 (114); Bernard Scholtz 4/27 (8 overs)

Namibia won by 27 runs
Central Broward Regional Park, Lauderhill
Umpires: Vijaya Mallela (USA) and Jacqueline Williams (WI)
Player of the match: Assad Vala (PNG)

- Namibia won the toss and elected to bat.
- Riley Hekure (PNG) made his ODI debut.
- Assad Vala (PNG) scored his first century in ODIs.
