= 2022 Namibia Tri-Nation Series =

The 2022 Namibia Tri-Nation Series can refer to:

- 2022 Capricorn Women's Tri-Series, a cricket tri-series between Namibia, Uganda and Zimbabwe in April 2022
- 2022 Namibia T20 Tri-Nation Series, an unofficial cricket tri-series between Namibia, Jersey and the United States in June 2022
- 2022 Namibia Tri-Nation Series (round 17), a cricket tri-series between Namibia, Papua New Guinea and the United States in November 2022
- 2022 Namibia Tri-Nation Series (round 18), a cricket tri-series between Namibia, Nepal and Scotland in December 2022
