= 2018–19 Men's T20 World Cup Africa qualifier =

Cricket tournament

The 2018–19 ICC T20 World Cup Africa Qualifier was a tournament played as part of qualification process for the 2021 ICC T20 World Cup.

Twelve regional qualifiers for the 2021 World Cup were held by the International Cricket Council (ICC), with 62 teams (Note: Zambia were originally scheduled to compete in the Southern sub region group in the Africa Qualifier, but later withdrew.) competing during 2018 in five regions – Africa (3 groups), Americas (2), Asia (2), East Asia Pacific (2) and Europe (3). The top 25 sides from these progressed to five Regional Finals in 2019, with seven teams then going on to compete in the 2019 ICC T20 World Cup Qualifier, (Note: The United Arab Emirates initially qualified to the Asia Regional Final, but later automatically progressed to the qualifier tournament as the host.) along with the six lowest ranked sides from the ICC T20I Championship.

The first African sub-regional qualifier (North-Western sub region) was held in Nigeria, with the two other groups staged in Botswana and Rwanda. The top two teams in each group advanced to the regional finals tournament, which will determine two African entrants to the 2019 ICC T20 World Cup Qualifier. In April 2018, the International Cricket Council (ICC) granted full international status to Twenty20 men's matches played between member sides from 1 January 2019 onwards. Therefore, all the matches in the Regional Finals were played as Twenty20 Internationals (T20Is).

From the North-Western sub region group, both Ghana and Nigeria qualified for the Africa Regional Finals. Simon Ateak of Ghana was named the player of the tournament in the North-Western group. The second group, the Eastern sub region, started on 7 July 2018. Both Kenya and Uganda qualified for the Africa Regional Finals from the Eastern sub region group. Uganda's Riazat Ali Shah was named the player of the tournament for the Eastern group. From the Southern sub region group, Botswana and Namibia qualified for the Africa Regional Finals.

The Regional Finals were held in Uganda in May 2019. Namibia and Kenya both progressed to the T20 World Cup Qualifier after finishing first and second respectively in the Regional Finals. In July 2019, the ICC suspended Zimbabwe Cricket, with the team barred from taking part in ICC events. As a result of their suspension, the ICC confirmed that Nigeria would replace them in the T20 World Cup Qualifier tournament.

== Teams ==
North-Western Sub-regional Group	Southern Sub-regional Group	Eastern Sub-regional Group
Gambia; Ghana; Nigeria; Sierra Leone	Botswana; Eswatini; Lesotho; Malawi; Mozambique; Namibia; Saint Helena	Kenya; Rwanda; Tanzania; Uganda

== North-Western sub region ==
2018 ICC T20 World Cup African Sub Regional Qualifier
- Dates: 14 – 21 April 2018
- Administrator: ICC Africa
- Cricket format: T20
- Tournament format: Double round-robin
- Host: Nigeria
- Champions: Ghana
- Participants: 4
- Matches: 12
- Player of the series: (Ghana) Simon Ateak
- Most runs: (Nigeria) Chimezie Onwuzulike (234)
- Most wickets: (Nigeria) Mohameed Taiwo (9) (Sierra Leone) Abu Kamara (9)

The North-Western sub region group was held in Nigeria from 14 to 21 April 2018.

=== Points table ===
Team	Pld	W	L	T	NR	Pts	NRR	Status
Ghana (Q)	6	5	0	0	1	11	+2.467	Advance to 2019 ICC World Twenty20 Africa Regional Finals
Nigeria (H,Q)	6	4	2	0	0	8	+1.690	Advance to 2019 ICC World Twenty20 Africa Regional Finals
Sierra Leone	6	2	3	0	1	5	–0.230	
Gambia	6	0	6	0	0	0	–3.776	

(H) Host, (Q) Qualified to next stage

=== Fixtures ===
14 April 2018
09:30
Scorecard

Nigeria; 165/6 (20 overs)	v	Sierra Leone; 77 (18.1 overs)
Chimezie Onwuzulike 54 (34); Abu Kamara 2/23 (3 overs)		Lansana Lamin 17 (20); Mohameed Taiwo 3/14 (3.1 overs)

Nigeria won by 88 runs
Tafawa Balewa Square Cricket Oval, Lagos
Umpires: Andrew Louw (Nam) and Ravi Angara (Bot)

- Sierra Leone won the toss and elected to field.

14 April 2018
13:50
Scorecard

Ghana; 173/4 (20 overs)	v	Gambia; 115/8 (20 overs)
Rexford Bakum 44 (33); Andre Jarju 2/29 (3 overs)		P Faye 55 (46); David Pereira 2/16 (2 overs)

Ghana won by 58 runs
Tafawa Balewa Square Cricket Oval, Lagos
Umpires: David Odhiambo (Ken) and Kehinde Olanbiwonnu (Nga)

- Ghana won the toss and elected to bat.

15 April 2018
09:30
Scorecard

Nigeria; 176/5 (20 overs)	v	Gambia; 121/7 (20 overs)
Ademola Onikoyi 75 (51); Basiru Jaye 2/26 (4 overs)		P Faye 29 (16); Daniel Gim 2/16 (3 overs)

Nigeria won by 55 runs
Tafawa Balewa Square Cricket Oval, Lagos
Umpires: David Odhiambo (Ken) and Andrew Louw (Nam)

- Nigeria won the toss and elected to bat.

15 April 2018
13:50
Scorecard

Ghana; 140/8 (20 overs)	v	Sierra Leone; 109/8 (20 overs)
Simon Ateak 57 (42); Richard Tommy 2/21 (3 overs)		Lansana Lamin 28 (25); Isaac Aboagye 2/28 (4 overs)

Ghana won by 31 runs
Tafawa Balewa Square Cricket Oval, Lagos
Umpires: Kehinde Olanbiwonnu (Nga) and Ravi Angara (Bot)

- Ghana won the toss and elected to bat.

17 April 2018
09:30
Scorecard

Gambia; 87 (18.3 overs)	v	Sierra Leone; 89/2 (12.5 overs)
Mbye Dumbuya 20 (29); Abu Kamara 3/17 (4 overs)		Abu Kamara 26* (17); P Faye 1/7 (1 over)

Sierra Leone won by 8 wickets
Tafawa Balewa Square Cricket Oval, Lagos
Umpires: Kehinde Olanbiwonnu (Nga) and Andrew Louw (Nam)

- Gambia won the toss and elected to bat.

17 April 2018
13:50
Scorecard

Nigeria; 119/8 (20 Overs)	v	Ghana; 120/3 (19.5 Overs)
Dotun Olatunji 46 (30); David Ankrah 3/14 (4 overs)		Simon Ateak 50* (57); Mohameed Taiwo 1/15 (3 overs)

Ghana won by 7 wickets
Tafawa Balewa Square Cricket Oval, Lagos
Umpires: Ravi Angara (Bot) and David Odhiambo (Ken)

- Nigeria won the toss and elected to bat.

18 April 2018
09:30
Scorecard

Ghana; 165/7 (20 overs)	v	Gambia; 56 (14.1 overs)
Rexford Bakum 64 (51); Aniru Conteh 2/28 (2 overs)		Basiru Jaye 11 (10); Mark Bawa 5/17 (4 overs)

Ghana won by 109 runs
Tafawa Balewa Square Cricket Oval, Lagos
Umpires: David Odhiambo (Ken) and Kehinde Olanbiwonnu (Nga)

- Ghana won the toss and elected to bat.

18 April 2018
13:50
Scorecard

Nigeria; 120/9 (20)	v	Sierra Leone; 114/5 (20)
Daniel Gim 30 (29); Richard Tommy 2/6 (2 overs)		Edward Ngegba 39 (30); Oluseye Olympio 1/7 (1 over)

Nigeria won by 6 runs
Tafawa Balewa Square Cricket Oval, Lagos
Umpires: Andrew Louw (Nam) and Ravi Angara (Bot)

- Nigeria won the toss and elected to bat

20 April 2018
09:30
Scorecard

Ghana	v	Sierra Leone

Match abandoned
Tafawa Balewa Square Cricket Oval, Lagos
Umpires: Kehinde Olanbiwonnu (Nga) and Ravi Angara (Bot)

- No toss.

20 April 2018
13:50
Scorecard

Nigeria; 144/3 (20 overs)	v	Gambia; 56 (14.5 overs)
Chimezie Onwuzulike 90 (70); Ismaila Tanba 1/16 (2 overs)		Andre Jarju 22 (28); Sylvester Okpe 4/7 (4 overs)

Nigeria won by 88 runs
Tafawa Balewa Square Cricket Oval, Lagos
Umpires: David Odhiambo (Ken) and Andrew Louw (Nam)

- Nigeria won the toss and elected to bat.

21 April 2018
09:30
Scorecard

Gambia; 82/8 (20 overs)	v	Sierra Leone; 83/2 (9.5 overs)
Ismaila Tanba 18 (20); Edward Ngegba 3/10 (4 overs)		Edward Ngegba 29* (28); Abubacarr Kuyateh 1/6 (2 overs)

Sierra Leone won by 8 wickets
Tafawa Balewa Square Cricket Oval, Lagos
Umpires: Kehinde Olanbiwonnu (Nga) and Andrew Louw (Nam)

- Gambia won the toss and elected to field.

21 April 2018
13:50
Scorecard

Nigeria; 73 (19.3 overs)	v	Ghana; 74/6 (13.4 overs)
Sylvester Okpe 25 (33); Kofi Bagabena 4/22 (3.3 overs)		Samson Awiah 26* (25); Mohameed Taiwo 2/27 (4 overs)

Ghana won by 6 wickets
Tafawa Balewa Square Cricket Oval, Lagos
Umpires: Ravi Angara (Bot) and David Odhiambo (Ken)

- Ghana won the toss and elected to field.

== Eastern sub region ==
2018 ICC T20 World Cup African Sub Regional Qualifier
- Dates: 7 – 14 July 2018
- Administrator: ICC Africa
- Cricket format: T20
- Tournament format: Double round-robin
- Host: Rwanda
- Champions: Kenya
- Participants: 4
- Matches: 12
- Player of the series: (Uganda) Riazat Ali Shah
- Most runs: (Uganda) Dinesh Nakrani (320)
- Most wickets: (Uganda) Irfan Afridi (13)

The Eastern sub region group was held in Rwanda from 7 to 14 July 2018.

=== Points table ===
Team	Pld	W	L	T	NR	Pts	NRR	Status
Kenya (Q)	6	5	1	0	0	10	+2.924	Advance to 2019 ICC World Twenty20 Africa Regional Finals
Uganda (Q)	6	4	2	0	0	8	+2.725	Advance to 2019 ICC World Twenty20 Africa Regional Finals
Tanzania	6	3	3	0	0	6	–0.429	
Rwanda (H)	6	0	6	0	0	0	–4.887	

(H) Host, (Q) Qualified to next stage

=== Fixtures ===
7 July 2018
09:30
Scorecard

Uganda; 240/3 (20 overs)	v	Kenya; 241/6 (19.3 overs)
Dinesh Nakrani 88* (42); Pushpak Kerai 1/30 (3 overs)		Dhiren Gondaria 90 (46); Dinesh Nakrani 2/57 (4 overs)

Kenya won by 4 wickets
Gahanga International Cricket Stadium, Kigali
Umpires: Shaun George (SA) and Andrew Louw (Nam)
Player of the match: Dhiren Gondaria (Ken)

- Kenya won the toss and elected to field.

7 July 2018
13:50
Scorecard

Tanzania; 197/7 (20 overs)	v	Rwanda; 121 (16.1 overs)
Abhik Patwa 56 (25); Eric Dusabemungu 2/28 (4 overs)		Eric Niyomugabo 43 (21); Salum Ally 2/12 (3 overs)

Tanzania won by 76 runs
Gahanga International Cricket Stadium, Kigali
Umpires: Isaac Oyieko (Ken) and Claude Thorburn (Nam)
Player of the match: Abhik Patwa (Tan)

- Tanzania won the toss and elected to bat.

8 July 2018
9:30
Scorecard

Uganda; 181/4 (20 overs)	v	Tanzania; 117/7 (20 overs)
Ronak Patel 66* (45); Harsh Ramaiya 2/22 (4 overs)		Muhammad Zafar Khan 33 (31); Irfan Afridi 3/9 (4 overs)

Uganda won by 64 runs
Gahanga International Cricket Stadium, Kigali
Umpires: Andrew Louw (Nam) and Isaac Oyieko (Ken)
Player of the match: Irfan Afridi (Uga)

- Uganda won the toss and elected to bat.

8 July 2018
13:50
Scorecard

Kenya; 270/6 (20 overs)	v	Rwanda; 147/8 (20 overs)
Alex Obanda 63 (22); Clinton Rububagumya 2/35 (3 overs)		Eric Niyomugabo 43 (24); Shem Ngoche 4/23 (4 overs)

Kenya won by 123 runs
Gahanga International Cricket Stadium, Kigali
Umpires: Shaun George (SA) and Claude Thorburn (Nam)
Player of the match: Collins Obuya (Ken)

- Kenya won the toss and elected to bat.

10 July 2018
9:30
Scorecard

Tanzania; 118 (19.4 overs)	v	Kenya; 119/3 (8.3 overs)
Jatin Chandubhai 52 (38); Shem Ngoche 3/23 (4 overs)		Rakep Patel 72 (27); Riziki Kiseto 2/25 (3 overs)

Kenya won by 7 wickets
Gahanga International Cricket Stadium, Kigali
Umpires: Andrew Louw (Nam) and Claude Thorburn (Nam)
Player of the match: Rakep Patel (Ken)

- Tanzania won the toss and elected to bat.

10 July 2018
13:50
Scorecard

Uganda; 204/4 (20 overs)	v	Rwanda; 34 (8.5 overs)
Dinesh Nakrani 74 (44); Yvan Mitari 2/45 (4 overs)		Eric Niyomugabo 13 (7); Irfan Afridi 5/12 (4 overs)

Uganda won by 170 runs
Gahanga International Cricket Stadium, Kigali
Umpires: Shaun George (SA) and Isaac Oyieko (Ken)
Player of the match: Irfan Afridi (Uga)

- Rwanda won the toss and elected to field.

11 July 2018
09:30
Scorecard

Uganda; 155/8 (20 overs)	v	Tanzania; 158/4 (19.1 overs)
Roger Mukasa 38 (39); Kassim Mussa 3/15 (2 overs)		Abhik Patwa 47 (36); Riazat Ali Shah 2/20 (4 overs)

Tanzania won by 6 wickets
Gahanga International Cricket Stadium, Kigali
Umpires: Shaun George (SA) and Wynand Louw (Nam)
Player of the match: Zamoyoni Jaboneke (Tan)

- Uganda won the toss and elected to bat.
- Kassim Mussa (Tan) took a hat-trick.

11 July 2018
13:50
Scorecard

Rwanda; 125 (19.3 overs)	v	Kenya; 129/5 (16.1 overs)
Bashir Songa 43 (31); Pushpak Kerai 4/25 (4 overs)		Collins Obuya 44* (35); Yvan Mitari 2/30 (3 overs)

Kenya won by 5 wickets
Gahanga International Cricket Stadium, Kigali
Umpires: Isaac Oyieko (Ken) and Claude Thorburn (Nam)
Player of the match: Pushpak Kerai (Ken)

- Rwanda won the toss and elected to bat.

13 July 2018
9:30
Scorecard

Kenya; 214/2 (20 overs)	v	Tanzania; 158/8 (20 overs)
Alex Obanda 108 (61); Jitin Singh 1/19 (2 overs)		Salum Ally 48 (26); Nehemiah Odhiambo 2/28 (4 overs)

Kenya won by 56 runs
Gahanga International Cricket Stadium, Kigali
Umpires: Shaun George (SA) and Claude Thorburn (Nam)
Player of the match: Alex Obanda (Ken)

- Kenya won the toss and elected to bat.

13 July 2018
13:50
Scorecard

Uganda; 201/7 (20 overs)	v	Rwanda; 107/9 (20 overs)
Riazat Ali Shah 96* (42); Eric Niyomugabo 2/39 (4 overs)		Eric Niyomugabo 22 (24); Irfan Afridi 3/22 (4 overs)

Uganda won by 94 runs
Gahanga International Cricket Stadium, Kigali
Umpires: Andrew Louw (Nam) and Isaac Oyieko (Ken)
Player of the match: Riazat Ali Shah (Uga)

- Uganda won the toss and elected to bat.

14 July 2018
9:30
Scorecard

Tanzania; 196/7 (20 overs)	v	Rwanda; 116 (19.2 overs)
Jatin Chandubhai 79 (49); Eric Dusabemungu 2/28 (4 overs)		Eric Niyomugabo 26 (22); Aaryan Premji 3/14 (4 overs)

Tanzania won by 80 runs
Gahanga International Cricket Stadium, Kigali
Umpires: Shaun George (SA) and Isaac Oyieko (Ken)
Player of the match: Jatin Chandubhai (Tan)

- Tanzania won the toss and elected to bat.

14 July 2018
13:50
Scorecard

Kenya; 188/5 (20 overs)	v	Uganda; 189/3 (18.5 overs)
Collins Obuya 67 (48); Bilal Hassan 2/34 (4 overs)		Dinesh Nakrani 102* (50); Shem Ngoche 1/13 (3 overs)

Uganda won by 7 wickets
Gahanga International Cricket Stadium, Kigali
Umpires: Andrew Louw (Nam) and Claude Thorburn (Nam)
Player of the match: Dinesh Nakrani (Uga)

- Uganda won the toss and elected to field.

== Southern sub region ==
2018 ICC T20 World Cup African Sub Regional Qualifier
- Dates: 28 October – 3 November 2018
- Administrator: ICC Africa
- Cricket format: T20
- Tournament format: Round-robin
- Host: Botswana
- Champions: Botswana
- Participants: 7
- Matches: 21
- Most runs: (Namibia) Lo-handre Louwrens (243)
- Most wickets: (Namibia) Zhivago Groenewald (14) (Mozambique) Filipe Cossa (14)

The Southern sub region group was held in Botswana from 28 October to 3 November 2018. Zambia, initially listed as an entrant, withdrew before the tournament draw was released.

=== Points table ===
Team	Pld	W	L	T	NR	Pts	NRR	Status
Botswana (H,Q)	6	6	0	0	0	12	+2.933	Advance to 2019 ICC World Twenty20 Africa Regional Finals
Namibia (Q)	6	5	1	0	0	10	+5.045	Advance to 2019 ICC World Twenty20 Africa Regional Finals
Saint Helena	6	3	3	0	0	6	–0.302	
Mozambique	6	3	3	0	0	6	–1.092	
Malawi	6	2	4	0	0	4	–0.404	
Lesotho	6	1	5	0	0	2	–2.839	
Eswatini	6	1	5	0	0	2	–3.603	

(H) Host, (Q) Qualified to next stage

=== Fixtures ===
28 October 2018
09:30
Scorecard

Botswana; 171/3 (20 overs)	v	Mozambique; 48 (14.1 overs)
Karabo Motlhanka 62* (46); Damiao Couana 2/28 (4 overs)		Kaleem Shah 19 (33); Mmoloki Mooketsi 2/7 (3 overs)

Botswana won by 123 runs
Botswana Cricket Association Oval 1, Gaborone
Umpires: Rockie D'Mello (Ken) and Claude Thorburn (Nam)
Player of the match: Karabo Motlhanka (Bot)

- Botswana won the toss and elected to bat.

28 October 2018
09:30
Scorecard

Eswatini; 72/6 (20 overs)	v	Namibia; 74/0 (5.2 overs)
Sohail Akhtar 25 (38); Zhivago Groenewald 5/1 (4 overs)		Pikky Ya France 44* (23)

Namibia won by 10 wickets
Botswana Cricket Association Oval 2, Gaborone
Umpires: Ravi Angara (Bot) and Patric Makumbi (Uga)
Player of the match: Zhivago Groenewald (Nam)

- Namibia won the toss and elected to field.

28 October 2018
13:50
Scorecard

Malawi; 85/9 (20 overs)	v	Namibia; 91/2 (12.1 overs)
Mohamed Abdulla 23* (25); Zhivago Groenewald 3/6 (4 overs)		Jan Frylinck 60* (29); Moazzam Baig 2/12 (2 overs)

Namibia won by 8 wickets
Botswana Cricket Association Oval 1, Gaborone
Umpires: Ravi Angara (Bot) and Rockie D'Mello (Ken)
Player of the match: Jan Frylinck (Nam)

- Malawi won the toss and elected to bat.

28 October 2018
13:50
Scorecard

Saint Helena; 182/5 (20 overs)	v	Eswatini; 90/8 (20 overs)
Andrew Yon 81 (48); Sohail Akhtar 1/10 (4 overs)		Junain Hansrod 27 (34); Scott Crowie 2/8 (3 overs)

Saint Helena won by 92 runs
Botswana Cricket Association Oval 2, Gaborone
Umpires: Justine Muzungu (Bot) and Claude Thorburn (Nam)
Player of the match: Andrew Yon (Saint Helena)

- Saint Helena won the toss and elected to bat.

29 October 2018
09:30
Scorecard

Eswatini; 105/7 (20 overs)	v	Lesotho; 109/2 (12.5 overs)
Junain Hansrod 31 (37); Sarfaraj Patel 3/21 (4 overs)		Sarfaraj Patel 34* (33); Haris Rashid 2/30 (3.5 overs)

Lesotho won by 8 wickets
Botswana Cricket Association Oval 1, Gaborone
Umpires: Justine Muzungu (Bot) and Claude Thorburn (Nam)
Player of the match: Sarfaraj Patel (Les)

- Lesotho won the toss and elected to field.

29 October 2018
09:30
Scorecard

Saint Helena; 136/5 (20 overs)	v	Malawi; 130/5 (20 overs)
Andrew Yon 54 (53); Gershom Ntambalika 3/14 (2 overs)		Donnex Kansonkho 41 (51); Scott Crowie 2/14 (4 overs)

Saint Helena won by 6 runs
Botswana Cricket Association Oval 2, Gaborone
Umpires: Ravi Angara (Bot) and Patric Makumbi (Uga)
Player of the match: Scott Crowie (Saint Helena)

- Saint Helena won the toss and elected to bat.

29 October 2018
13:50
Scorecard

Saint Helena; 196/5 (20 overs)	v	Lesotho; 123 (17.2 overs)
Scott Crowie 63* (31); Riaz Suleman 2/31 (4 overs)		Maaz Khan 51 (27); Phillip Stroud 3/10 (2.2 overs)

Saint Helena won by 73 runs
Botswana Cricket Association Oval 1, Gaborone
Umpires: Ravi Angara (Bot) and Justine Muzungu (Bot)
Player of the match: Scott Crowie (Saint Helena)

- Saint Helena won the toss and elected to bat.

29 October 2018
13:50
Scorecard

Namibia; 229/6 (20 overs)	v	Mozambique; 104 (18.4 overs)
Lo-handre Louwrens 100 (49); Filipe Cossa 2/30 (3 overs)		Damiao Couana 28 (36); Tangeni Lungameni 5/16 (4 overs)

Namibia won by 125 runs
Botswana Cricket Association Oval 2, Gaborone
Umpires: Rockie D'Mello (Ken) and Patric Makumbi (Uga)
Player of the match: Lo-handre Louwrens (Nam)

- Namibia won the toss and elected to bat.
- Tangeni Lungameni (Nam) took a hat-trick.

30 October 2018
09:30
Scorecard

Botswana; 144/5 (20 overs)	v	Saint Helena; 63 (18.2 overs)
Karabo Motlhanka 50* (46); Ryan Belgrove 2/48 (4 overs)		Scott Crowie 13 (29); Mmoloki Mooketsi 3/5 (2.2 overs)

Botswana won by 81 runs
Botswana Cricket Association Oval 1, Gaborone
Umpires: Rockie D'Mello (Ken) and Claude Thorburn (Nam)
Player of the match: Adithiya Rangaswamy (Bot)

- Botswana won the toss and elected to bat.

30 October 2018
09:30
Scorecard

Eswatini; 99 (20 overs)	v	Malawi; 104/2 (11.4 overs)
Sohail Akhtar 21 (18); Mohamed Abdulla 6/12 (4 overs)		Muhammad Khurram 35* (27); Haris Rashid 1/10 (2 overs)

Malawi won by 8 wickets
Botswana Cricket Association Oval 2, Gaborone
Umpires: Ravi Angara (Bot) and Justine Muzungu (Bot)
Player of the match: Mohamed Abdulla (Maw)

- Eswatini won the toss and elected to bat.

30 October 2018
13:50
Scorecard

Mozambique; 183/8 (20 overs)	v	Lesotho; 117/7 (20 overs)
Filipe Cossa 59 (29); Mthimkhulu Leporoporo 5/24 (4 overs)		Sameer Patel 36 (28); Filipe Cossa 3/11 (4 overs)

Mozambique won by 66 runs
Botswana Cricket Association Oval 1, Gaborone
Umpires: Justine Muzungu (Bot) and Claude Thorburn (Nam)
Player of the match: Filipe Cossa (Moz)

- Mozambique won the toss and elected to bat.

30 October 2018
13:50
Scorecard

Botswana; 158/5 (20 overs)	v	Malawi; 143/7 (20 overs)
Vinoo Balakrishnan 46 (30); Hamza Patel 1/9 (1 over)		Sami Sohail 56 (49); Adithiya Rangaswamy 2/20 (4 overs)

Botswana won by 15 runs
Botswana Cricket Association Oval 2, Gaborone
Umpires: Rockie D'Mello (Ken) and Patric Makumbi (Uga)
Player of the match: Sami Sohail (Maw)

- Botswana won the toss and elected to bat.

1 November 2018
09:30
Scorecard

Malawi; 104/6 (20 overs)	v	Mozambique; 108/5 (16 overs)
Sami Sohail 42* (48); Filipe Cossa 3/7 (4 overs)		Imran Ismail 31 (15); Sami Sohail 2/11 (4 overs)

Mozambique won by 5 wickets
Botswana Cricket Association Oval 1, Gaborone
Umpires: Rockie D'Mello (Ken) and Justine Muzungu (Bot)
Player of the match: Filipe Cossa (Moz)

- Malawi won the toss and elected to bat.

1 November 2018
09:30
Scorecard

Namibia; 214/4 (20 overs)	v	Lesotho; 35 (14 overs)
Lo-handre Louwrens 84 (48); Ts'episo Chaoana 2/37 (4 overs)		Sameer Patel 13 (20); Zhivago Groenewald 3/6 (4 overs)

Namibia won by 179 runs
Botswana Cricket Association Oval 2, Gaborone
Umpires: Ravi Angara (Bot) and Patric Makumbi (Uga)
Player of the match: Lo-handre Louwrens (Nam)

- Namibia won the toss and elected to bat.

1 November 2018
13:50
Scorecard

Eswatini; 89/6 (20 overs)	v	Botswana; 91/1 (11.2 overs)
Shehzad Patel 19 (23); Dhruv Maisuria 2/17 (3 overs)		Karabo Motlhanka 41* (34); Imran Patel 1/12 (2 overs)

Botswana won by 9 wickets
Botswana Cricket Association Oval 1, Gaborone
Umpires: Patric Makumbi (Uga) and Claude Thorburn (Nam)
Player of the match: Tshepo Phaswana (Bot)

- Eswatini won the toss and elected to bat.

1 November 2018
13:50
Scorecard

Malawi; 128/8 (20 overs)	v	Lesotho; 124 (20 overs)
Sami Sohail 39 (40); Sarfaraj Patel 2/15 (3 overs)		Chachole Tlali 58 (52); Mahammed Patel 3/5 (4 overs)

Malawi won by 4 runs
Botswana Cricket Association Oval 2, Gaborone
Umpires: Rockie D'Mello (Ken) and Justine Muzungu (Bot)
Player of the match: Chachole Tlali (Les)

- Malawi won the toss and elected to bat.

2 November 2018
09:30
Scorecard

Saint Helena; 123/8 (20 overs)	v	Mozambique; 126/3 (15.1 overs)
Jordi Henry 23 (29); Filipe Cossa 3/11 (4 overs)		Damiao Couana 52 (37); Jordi Henry 1/27 (2 overs)

Mozambique won by 7 wickets
Botswana Cricket Association Oval 1, Gaborone
Umpires: Ravi Angara (Bot) and Justine Muzungu (Bot)
Player of the match: Damiao Couana (Moz)

- Saint Helena won the toss and elected to bat.

2 November 2018
09:30
Scorecard

Lesotho; 99/9 (20 overs)	v	Botswana; 100/4 (12.4 overs)
Sarfaraj Patel 46 (67); Adithiya Rangaswamy 2/7 (4 overs)		Inzimamul Master 34* (27); Sarfaraj Patel 2/27 (4 overs)

Botswana won by 6 wickets
Botswana Cricket Association Oval 2, Gaborone
Umpires: Bongani Jele (SA) and Claude Thorburn (Nam)
Player of the match: Adithiya Rangaswamy (Bot)

- Lesotho won the toss and elected to bat.

2 November 2018
13:50
Scorecard

Mozambique; 145 (18.1 overs)	v	Eswatini; 149/2 (18.5 overs)
Damiao Couana 63 (39); Haris Rashid 4/23 (4 overs)		Shehzad Patel 78 (54); Filipe Cossa 2/11 (4 overs)

Eswatini won by 8 wickets
Botswana Cricket Association Oval 1, Gaborone
Umpires: Patric Makumbi (Uga) and Claude Thorburn (Nam)
Player of the match: Shehzad Patel (Swz)

- Mozambique won the toss and elected to bat.

2 November 2018
13:50
Scorecard

Namibia; 180/8 (20 overs)	v	Saint Helena; 90 (17.5 overs)
Zhivago Groenewald 50* (30); Andrew Yon 4/27 (4 overs)		Andrew Yon 28 (18); Christopher Coombe 4/24 (3.5 overs)

Namibia won by 90 runs
Botswana Cricket Association Oval 2, Gaborone
Umpires: Ravi Angara (Bot) and Rockie D'Mello (Ken)
Player of the match: Zhivago Groenewald (Nam)

- Namibia won the toss and elected to bat.

3 November 2018
10:30
Scorecard

Namibia; 116/9 (20 overs)	v	Botswana; 117/7 (19 overs)
Lo-handre Louwrens 36 (27); Thatayaone Tshose 3/33 (4 overs)		Reginald Nehonde 30 (36); Jan Frylinck 2/11 (4 overs)

Botswana won by 3 wickets
Botswana Cricket Association Oval 1, Gaborone
Umpires: Rockie D'Mello (Ken) and Patric Makumbi (Uga)
Player of the match: James Moses (Bot)

- Namibia won the toss and elected to bat.

== Regional Finals ==
2019 ICC T20 World Cup Africa Regional Finals
- Dates: 20 – 24 May 2019
- Administrator: ICC Africa
- Cricket format: Twenty20 International
- Tournament format: Round-robin
- Host: Uganda
- Champions: Namibia
- Runners-up: Kenya
- Participants: 6
- Matches: 15
- Player of the series: (Kenya) Rakep Patel
- Most runs: (Uganda) Riazat Ali Shah (140)
- Most wickets: (Namibia) Christi Viljoen (9)

The Regional Finals were held in Uganda from 20 to 24 May 2019, with the top two sides progressing to the 2019 ICC T20 World Cup Qualifier tournament in the UAE. Originally, the finals were scheduled to start on 19 May, but all three fixtures were washed out, with the matches rescheduled for the tournament's reserve day. Ahead of the final day of fixtures, Kenya, Namibia and Nigeria were all in contention of finishing in the top two places and progressing to the 2019 ICC T20 World Cup Qualifier tournament. However, all of the matches on the last day were washed out, therefore Namibia and Kenya both progressed to the T20 World Cup Qualifier after finishing first and second respectively in the Regional Finals.

In August 2019, the ICC confirmed that Nigeria had also progressed to the T20 World Cup Qualifier, after Zimbabwe had been suspended from taking part in international cricket tournaments in the previous month.

Qualified Teams
North-Western sub-region	Ghana
North-Western sub-region	Nigeria
Eastern sub-region	Kenya
Eastern sub-region	Uganda
Southern sub-region	Botswana
Southern sub-region	Namibia

=== Points table ===
Pos	Team	Pld	W	L	T	NR	Pts	NRR	
1	Namibia	5	3	0	0	2	8	4.547	Qualify to 2019 T20 World Cup Qualifier
2	Kenya	5	3	0	0	2	8	1.363	Qualify to 2019 T20 World Cup Qualifier
3	Nigeria	5	2	1	0	2	6	0.394	Qualify to 2019 T20 World Cup Qualifier
4	Uganda (H)	5	2	2	0	1	5	0.587	
5	Botswana	5	0	3	0	2	2	−3.028	
6	Ghana	5	0	4	0	1	1	−2.361	

(H) Host

=== Fixtures ===
20 May 2019
09:30
Scorecard

Nigeria; 105/5 (15 overs)	v	Kenya; 106/2 (12.2 overs)
Leke Oyede 27* (27); Shem Ngoche 2/6 (3 overs)		Dhiren Gondaria 47* (31); Leke Oyede 1/15 (3 overs)

Kenya won by 8 wickets
Kyambogo Cricket Oval, Kampala
Umpires: Andrew Louw (Nam) and Langton Rusere (Zim)
Player of the match: Shem Ngoche (Ken)

- Kenya won the toss and elected to field.
- The match was reduced to 15 overs per side due to rain.
- Pushpak Kerai, Eugene Ochieng (Ken), Abiodun Abioye, Rasheed Abolarin, Vincent Adewoye, Joshua Ayannaike, Isaac Danladi, Ademola Onikoyi, Isaac Okpe, Sylvester Okpe, Chimezie Onwuzulike, Leke Oyede and Ovais Yousof (Nga) all made their T20I debuts.
- Nigeria played their first men's T20I match.

20 May 2019
13:50
Scorecard

Ghana; 91/7 (20 overs)	v	Namibia; 92/1 (10.5 overs)
Simon Ateak 26 (22); Zhivago Groenewald 3/20 (4 overs)		Stephan Baard 52* (34); Vincent Ateak 1/27 (3 overs)

Namibia won by 9 wickets
Kyambogo Cricket Oval, Kampala
Umpires: Iknow Chabi (Zim) and Kehinde Olanbiwonnu (Nga)
Player of the match: Stephan Baard (Nam)

- Namibia won the toss and elected to field.
- Isaac Aboagye, Michael Aboagye, Daniel Anefie, David Ankrah, Simon Ateak, Vincent Ateak, Frank Baaleri, Kofi Bagabena, Rexford Bakum, Julius Mensah, Lakmal Perera (Gha), Stephan Baard, Karl Birkenstock, Niko Davin, Gerhard Erasmus, Jan Frylinck, Zane Green, Zhivago Groenewald, Tangeni Lungameni, Bernard Scholtz, JJ Smit and Christi Viljoen (Nam) all made their T20I debuts.
- Ghana and Namibia both played their first men's T20I match.

20 May 2019
13:50
Scorecard

Uganda; 142/7 (20 overs)	v	Botswana; 90 (18 overs)
Arnold Otwani 44 (27); Karabo Modise 3/18 (3 overs)		Vinoo Balakrishnan 26 (32); Frank Nsubuga 2/19 (4 overs)

Uganda won by 52 runs
Lugogo Stadium, Kampala
Umpires: Emmanuel Byiringiro (Rwa) and David Odhiambo (Ken)
Player of the match: Arnold Otwani (Uga)

- Botswana won the toss and elected to field.
- Zephania Arinaitwe, Emmanuel Isaneez, Hamu Kayondo, Deusdedit Muhumuza, Roger Mukasa, Dinesh Nakrani, Frank Nsubuga, Arnold Otwani, Riazat Ali Shah, Henry Ssenyondo, Charles Waiswa (Uga), Vinoo Balakrishnan, Inzimamul Master, Nabil Master, Karabo Modise, Mmoloki Mooketsi, James Moses, Karabo Motlhanka, Reginald Nehonde, Tharindu Perera, Adithiya Rangaswamy and Thatayaone Tshose (Bot) all made their T20I debuts.
- Botswana and Uganda both played their first men's T20I match.

21 May 2019
09:30
Scorecard

Namibia; 167/7 (20 overs)	v	Uganda; 125/8 (20 overs)
Karl Birkenstock 59 (28); Dinesh Nakrani 2/29 (4 overs)		Riazat Ali Shah 19 (16); Christi Viljoen 4/15 (4 overs)

Namibia won by 42 runs
Kyambogo Cricket Oval, Kampala
Umpires: David Odhiambo (Ken) and Langton Rusere (Zim)
Player of the match: Karl Birkenstock (Nam)

- Namibia won the toss and elected to bat.

21 May 2019
13:50
Scorecard

Kenya; 141/5 (20 overs)	v	Ghana; 88 (17.3 overs)
Rakep Patel 55 (27); Isaac Aboagye 3/26 (4 overs)		James Vifah 23 (26); Pushpak Kerai 3/15 (3 overs)

Kenya won by 53 runs
Kyambogo Cricket Oval, Kampala
Umpires: Andrew Louw (Nam) and Kehinde Olanbiwonnu (Nga)
Player of the match: Rakep Patel (Ken)

- Ghana won the toss and elected to field.
- Godfred Bakiweyem and James Vifah (Gha) both made their T20I debuts.

21 May 2019
13:50
Scorecard

Nigeria; 119 (19.5 overs)	v	Botswana; 108/7 (20 overs)
Isaac Danladi 37 (34); Adithiya Rangaswamy 4/21 (3.5 overs)		Vinoo Balakrishnan 29* (30); Isaac Okpe 2/17 (4 overs)

Nigeria won by 11 runs
Lugogo Stadium, Kampala
Umpires: Emmanuel Byiringiro (Rwa) and Iknow Chabi (Zim)
Player of the match: Isaac Danladi (Nga)

- Nigeria won the toss and elected to bat.
- Dhruv Maisuria (Bot), Chima Akachukwu and Mohameed Taiwo (Nga) all made their T20I debuts.

22 May 2019
09:30
Scorecard

Nigeria; 135/8 (20 overs)	v	Ghana; 107/8 (20 overs)
Ademola Onikoyi 49 (35); Godfred Bakiweyem 2/15 (4 overs)		Kofi Bagabena 23* (23); Vincent Adewoye 4/18 (4 overs)

Nigeria won by 28 runs
Kyambogo Cricket Oval, Kampala
Umpires: David Odhiambo (Ken) and Kehinde Olanbiwonnu (Nga)
Player of the match: Vincent Adewoye (Nga)

- Ghana won the toss and elected to field.

22 May 2019
13:50
Scorecard

Botswana; 46 (12.1 overs)	v	Namibia; 50/0 (3.5 overs)
Nabil Master 21 (16); Christi Viljoen 5/9 (4 overs)		Niko Davin 37* (19)

Namibia won by 10 wickets
Kyambogo Cricket Oval, Kampala
Umpires: Emmanuel Byiringiro (Rwa) and Langton Rusere (Zim)
Player of the match: Christi Viljoen (Nam)

- Botswana won the toss and elected to bat.
- Zain Abbasi and Tshepo Phaswana (Bot) both made their T20I debuts.
- Christi Viljoen (Nam) took his first five-wicket haul in T20Is.

22 May 2019
13:50
Scorecard

Kenya; 145/6 (20 overs)	v	Uganda; 144/9 (20 overs)
Rakep Patel 51* (22); Charles Waiswa 4/38 (4 overs)		Riazat Ali Shah 44* (35); Nelson Odhiambo 3/30 (4 overs)

Kenya won by 1 run
Lugogo Stadium, Kampala
Umpires: Iknow Chabi (Zim) and Andrew Louw (Nam)
Player of the match: Rakep Patel (Ken)

- Kenya won the toss and elected to bat.
- Rogers Olipa (Uga) and Sachin Bhudia (Ken) both made their T20I debuts.

23 May 2019
09:30
Scorecard

Botswana	v	Kenya

Match abandoned
Kyambogo Cricket Oval, Kampala
Umpires: Kehinde Olanbiwonnu (Nga) and Langton Rusere (Zim)

- No toss.
- No play was possible due to rain.

23 May 2019
13:50
Scorecard

Ghana; 113/6 (20 overs)	v	Uganda; 117/3 (15.1 overs)
Michael Aboagye 24 (27); Henry Ssenyondo 3/14 (4 overs)		Riazat Ali Shah 53* (36); Isaac Aboagye 1/21 (4 overs)

Uganda won by 7 wickets
Kyambogo Cricket Oval, Kampala
Umpires: Andrew Louw (Nam) and David Odhiambo (Ken)
Player of the match: Riazat Ali Shah (Uga)

- Ghana won the toss and elected to bat.
- Fred Achelam and Brian Masaba (Uga) both made their T20I debuts.

23 May 2019
13:50
Scorecard

Nigeria	v	Namibia

Match abandoned
Lugogo Stadium, Kampala
Umpires: Emmanuel Byiringiro (Rwa) and Iknow Chabi (Zim)

- No toss.
- No play was possible due to rain.

24 May 2019
09:30
Scorecard

Ghana	v	Botswana

Match abandoned
Kyambogo Cricket Oval, Kampala
Umpires: Emmanuel Byiringiro (Rwa) and Langton Rusere (Zim)

- No toss.
- No play was possible due to rain.

24 May 2019
13:50
Scorecard

Namibia	v	Kenya

Match abandoned
Kyambogo Cricket Oval, Kampala
Umpires: Iknow Chabi (Zim) and Kehinde Olanbiwonnu (Nga)

- No toss.
- No play was possible due to rain.

24 May 2019
13:50
Scorecard

Nigeria	v	Uganda

Match abandoned
Lugogo Stadium, Kampala
Umpires: Andrew Louw (Nam) and David Odhiambo (Ken)

- No toss.
- No play was possible due to rain.
