= Ateak =

Ateak is a Ghanaian surname. Notable people with the surname include:

- Simon Ateak (born 1993), Ghanaian cricketer
- Vincent Ateak (born 1997), Ghanaian cricketer

== See also ==
- Atiq
