= Irfan Afridi =

Ugandan cricketer

Personal information
- Full name: Mohammed Irfan Afridi
- Born: 24 March 1985 (age 41); Karachi, Pakistan
- Relatives: Shahid Afridi (uncle)

International information
- National side: Uganda
- Source: Cricinfo, 9 October 2018

Mohammed Irfan Afridi (born 24 March 1985) is a Pakistani-born Ugandan cricketer who plays for the Uganda national cricket team. He was born in Karachi, Pakistan, and is a nephew of former Pakistan international cricketer Shahid Afridi. He made his international debut for Uganda in September 2016 against Qatar.

In May 2017, he played in the 2017 ICC World Cricket League Division Three tournament in Uganda. In Uganda's match against Malaysia, he scored 108 not out and was named the man of the match.

In April 2018, he was named in Uganda's squad for the 2018 ICC World Cricket League Division Four tournament in Malaysia. He was named as the player to watch in the squad ahead of the tournament. In Uganda's second match of the tournament, against Bermuda, he took six wickets for 23 runs and was named the man of the match. In Uganda's next match, against Vanuatu, he scored 51 runs and took three wickets, and was again named the man of the match. He finished as the leading wicket-taker for the tournament, with fifteen dismissals in six matches.

In July 2018, he was part of Uganda's squad in the Eastern sub-region group for the 2018–19 ICC World Twenty20 Africa Qualifier tournament. In Uganda's third match of the tournament, against Rwanda, he took five wickets for twelve runs and was named the man of the match. He finished as the leading wicket-taker in the qualifying group, with thirteen dismissals in six matches. In September 2018, he was named in Uganda's squad for the 2018 Africa T20 Cup.

In October 2018, he was named in Uganda's squad for the 2018 ICC World Cricket League Division Three tournament in Oman. In Uganda's second match of the tournament, against the United States, Afridi only bowled one over, as his bowling action was deemed to be suspect by the umpire, and the Uganda captain Roger Mukasa told that Afridi would be no-balled if he continued. Two days later, the International Cricket Council (ICC) deemed his action to be above the levels of the tolerance allowed, concluding that his action was illegal. and he was suspended from bowling in international matches.

== See also ==
- Hamza Almuzahim
- Davis Arinaitwe
- Zephania Arinaitwe
- Raymond Otim
