= Central Broward Park =

Sports stadium

Coordinates: 26.139959°N 80.198689°W

Central Broward Park & Broward County Stadium
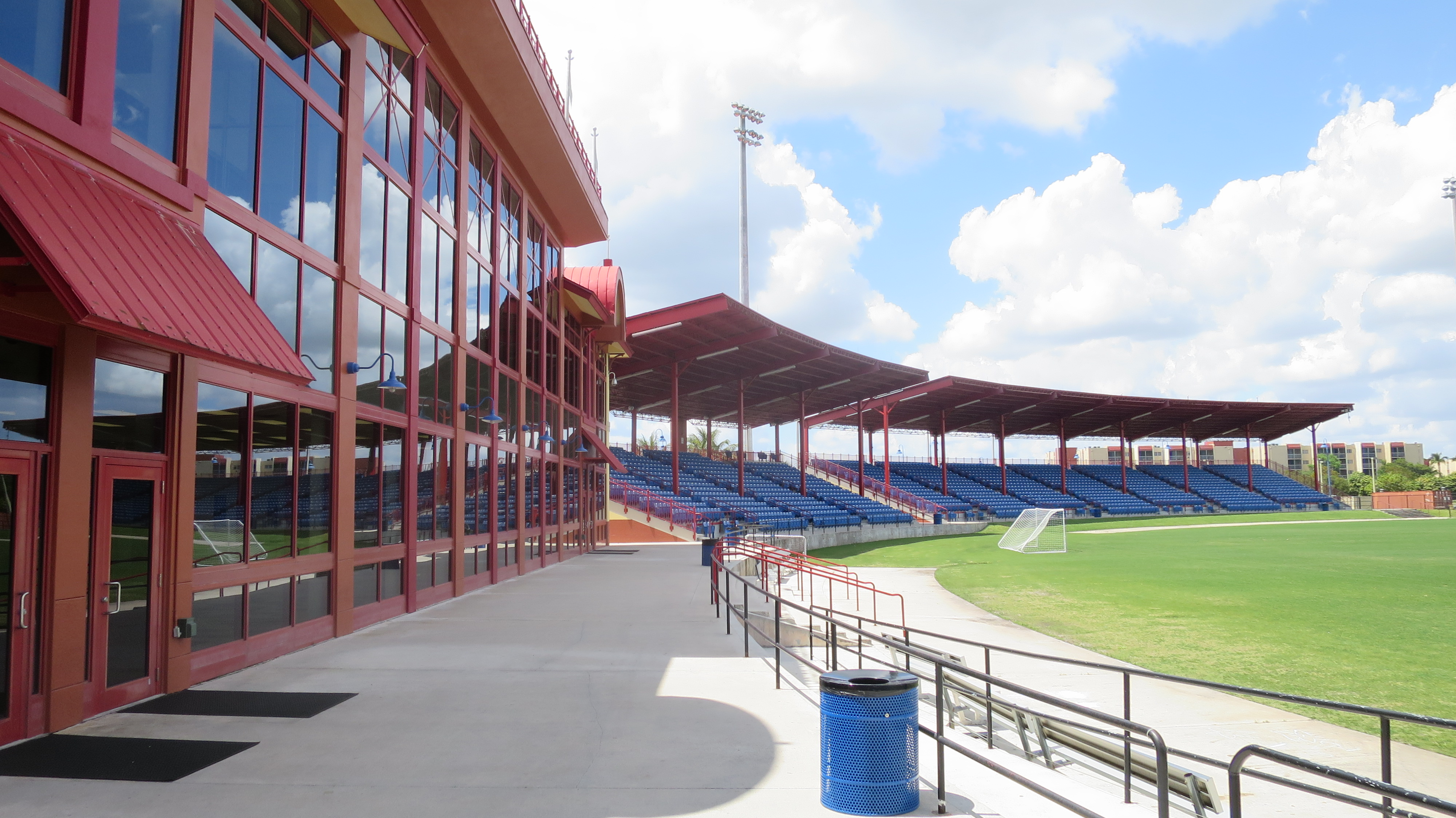
- Interactive map of Central Broward Park & Broward County Stadium

Ground information
- Location: 3700 NW 11th Place; Lauderhill, Florida 33311
- Country: United States of America
- Establishment: 2007; 19 years ago
- Capacity: 25,000
- Owner: Broward County, Florida; USA Cricket
- Architect: H.J. Russell; Seawood Builders
- Operator: Broward County; Parks and Recreation Division
- Tenants: Fort Lauderdale Fighting Squids (USAFL) (2008–present); South Florida Elite Futbol Club (USYS) (2008–present); Floridians FC (PDL) (2010–present); Fort Lauderdale Strikers (NASL) (2016); Paris Saint-Germain Academy USA; United States national cricket team
- End names
- North End; Pavilion End

International information
- First men's ODI: 13 September 2019: United States v Papua New Guinea
- Last men's ODI: 27 May 2025: United States v Oman
- First men's T20I: 22 May 2010: New Zealand v Sri Lanka
- Last men's T20I: 3 August 2025: West Indies v Pakistan
- First women's T20I: 17 May 2019: United States v Canada
- Last women's T20I: 19 May 2019: United States v Canada
- As of 31 July 2025; Source: Cricinfo; CricketArchive

Central Broward Park & Broward County Stadium, formerly Central Broward Regional Park and Central Broward Stadium, is a large county park in Lauderhill, Florida. It opened on November 9, 2007, at a construction cost of $70 million. It is located at the corner of US 441 and State Road 838 (Sunrise Blvd.).

The stadium was the first U.S. cricket pitch to receive certification by the International Cricket Council (ICC) to host international matches; it hosted its first international Twenty20 series in 2010, featuring New Zealand and Sri Lanka. In September 2019, the stadium hosted the United States' first-ever One Day International (ODI) series, which included the United States' first ODI victory.

== Main Event Field ==
=== Cricket ===
The Main Event Field was designed with cricket in mind. It features a large circular grass field, roughly 167 yards (153 meters) diameter. Surrounding it is a 10,000-seat stadium and large berms capable of holding 15,000 more. It also features stadium lighting and a luxury viewing area. It was the first venue in the United States officially certified by the ICC for playing ODIs.

The first organized cricket event held there was a Twenty20 cricket tournament, the Martin Luther King Twenty20 Cricket Tournament (MLK T20), from January 18–20, 2008. The event featured local players from India, Pakistan and the West Indies. The first international tournament hosted was another Twenty20 tournament, the MAQ T20 International Cricket Tournament, on May 23–25, 2008. That event featured teams from Canada, Pakistan, the West Indies, and the rest of the world, including former superstars such as Javed Miandad, Richie Richardson, and Mohammed Azharuddin.

The park also hosted the first full cricket international matches on American soil, a two-match Twenty20 series between New Zealand and Sri Lanka, on May 22 and May 23 2010. The series was drawn 1-1, a low-scoring affair (the highest total by either team was New Zealand's 120/7 in the first game), with a healthy and supportive crowd, as well as the fine-quality facilities (allowing for the exception of substandard lighting, which resulted in the cancellation of an originally scheduled night match).

On June 30 and July 1 2012, New Zealand and the West Indies played 2 T20 Internationals at this ground, with the Windies winning both matches convincingly. In 2016, the West Indies-based Caribbean Premier League played multiple matches at the park during the second half of July.

On August 2, 2016, India and the West Indies announced that they would play a two-match T20 series on August 27 and 28, marking India's first international matches on American soil, as an addendum to India's tour of the Caribbean. Ahead of the start of the series, Indian coach and retired star leg-spin bowler Anil Kumble said about the park, "I certainly didn't expect the facilities to be as good as what it is in the United States. I certainly felt that it could be a makeshift. I had heard about Florida and this ground, but very impressed with the facilities that we have seen today."

Only one match produced a result, with the second match ending in a no result due to rain and a technical delay. In the first match of the series, India's KL Rahul scored the second-fastest T20I century off only 46 balls, eventually finishing on 110 not out for the highest international score in the venue's history. The two teams also posted the highest international innings totals in the venue's history, with the West Indies winning by one run (245/6 off 20 overs against 244/4 off 20 overs) thanks to Evin Lewis' own century (100 off 49 balls).

It also hosted two T20I matches between the West Indies and Bangladesh in August 2018.

In 2019, it also played host to two of the three T20I matches in the T20I Series in the a tour of the West Indies by India. The first T20I held on August 3, 2019, was a low scoring match between the teams. India opted to field first and restricted West Indies to a total of 95. India struggled to get there but managed to win the match by 4 wickets. The second T20I, held on the next day was won by the Indian cricket team by 22 runs (D/L Method) in a match which had its second innings curtailed due to lightning and heavy rain.

In September 2019, the venue hosted the United States Tri-Nation Series, part of the 2019–22 ICC Cricket World Cup League 2—marking the first One Day International (ODI) matches to ever be held in the United States, and the U.S. national team's first-ever ODI win.

== Sports ==
=== Soccer ===
The Main Event Field began hosting the Floridians FC, a soccer team in the Premier Development League, in 2015.

In 2016, The Main Event Field was also home of Fort Lauderdale Strikers of the now defunct North American Soccer League.

The stadium was the home of Storm FC of the NPSL during the 2021 season (postponed from the 2020 season due to the COVID-19 pandemic).

=== Australian Rules Football ===
The Main Event Field was the home of the Fort Lauderdale Fighting Squids of the United States Australian Football League in 2008.

In 2015 the venue hosted the 10th edition of the 49th Parallel Cup, an annual Australian Football match between the U.S. and Canada.

=== Other sports ===
The mayor of Lauderhill, Richard J. Kaplan, sent a letter to ICC chief executive Dave Richardson in April 2013, stating that the council was looking at redeveloping the cricket stadium into a multi-sports facility, due to the lack of income and marquee events that have recently been held at the Field.

It also hosted the United States national rugby union team's home leg in their 2011 Rugby World Cup qualifier against Uruguay on November 21, 2009. With a win in Uruguay in the first leg, the U.S. already secured its place in New Zealand with a 27–6 win.

The Fort Lauderdale Barracudas of the Stars Football League played their three home games at the park during the 2012 season. The league played all of its games at the stadium for the 2013 season.

== 2024 ICC Men’s T20 World Cup matches ==
11 June 2024
19:30 UTC−4 (N)
Scorecard

Nepal	v	Sri Lanka

Match abandoned
Central Broward Regional Park Stadium, Lauderhill, Florida
Umpires: Chris Gaffaney (NZ) and Richard Kettleborough (Eng)

- No toss.
- No play was possible due to rain.
- South Africa qualified for the Super 8 as a result of this match.

14 June 2024
10:30 UTC−4
Scorecard

United States	v	Ireland

Match abandoned
Central Broward Park, Lauderhill
Umpires: Sharfuddoula (Ban) and Rod Tucker (Aus)

- No toss.
- No play was possible due to rain.
- United States qualified for the Super 8 while Canada, Ireland and Pakistan were eliminated as a result of this match.

15 June 2024
10:30 UTC−4
Scorecard

Canada	v	India

Match abandoned
Central Broward Park, Lauderhill
Umpires: Richard Kettleborough (Eng) and Sharfuddoula (Ban)

- No toss.
- No play was possible due to rain.

16 June 2024
10:30 UTC−4
Scorecard

Ireland; 106/9 (20 overs)	v	Pakistan; 111/7 (18.5 overs)
Gareth Delany 31 (19); Imad Wasim 3/8 (4 overs)		Babar Azam 32* (34); Barry McCarthy 3/15 (4 overs)

Pakistan won by 3 wickets
Central Broward Park, Lauderhill
Umpires: Chris Gaffaney (NZ) and Rod Tucker (Aus)
Player of the match: Shaheen Afridi (Pak)

- Pakistan won the toss and elected to field.

== Other amenities ==
The park also has two large artificial turf practice fields. They can be split into four American football or soccer fields, or combined into two cricket pitches. It also features standard playgrounds, a 1.5-mile walking trail, and basketball, netball and tennis courts. A water park—Tropical Splash—opened in March 2008.

The park was also the home to the MLS Combine, the future stars of Major League Soccer since its inception in 2011 until it was discontinued in 2020.

== List of centuries ==
=== One Day International centuries ===
The following table summarizes the One-day International centuries scored at the site.

No.	Score	Player	Team	Balls	Inns.	Opposing team	Date	Result
1	136	Jean-Pierre Kotze	Namibia	109	1	United States	September 20, 2019	Won
2	104	Assad Vala	Papua New Guinea	114	2	Namibia	September 23, 2019	Lost

=== T20 International centuries ===
The following table summarizes the Twenty20 International centuries scored at the site.

No.	Score	Player	Team	Balls	Inns.	Opposing team	Date	Result
1	100	Evin Lewis	West Indies	49	1	India	August 27, 2016	Won
2	110*	KL Rahul	India	51	2	West Indies	August 27, 2016	Lost

== International five-wicket hauls ==
A single five-wicket haul has been taken on the ground in international matches. Namibian bowler Zhivago Groenewald took five wickets for the cost of 20 runs against the United States in a One Day International match in 2019.

Five-wicket hauls in One Day International cricket at Central Broward Park
No.	Bowler	Date	Team	Opposing Team	Inn	O	R	W	Result
1	Zhivago Groenewald	September 20, 2019	Namibia	United States	1	8	25	5	Namibia won
