= Lakmal Perera =

Ghanaian cricketer (born 1986)

Personal information
- Born: 7 January 1986 (age 40); Colombo
- Batting: Right-handed
- Bowling: Right-arm off break
- Role: All-rounder

International information
- National side: Ghana
- T20I debut (cap 11): 20 May 2019 v Namibia
- Last T20I: 22 May 2019 v Nigeria
- Source: Cricinfo, 22 May 2019

Lakmal Perera (born 7 January 1986) is a Ghanaian cricketer. In May 2019, he was named in Ghana's squad for the Regional Finals of the 2018–19 ICC T20 World Cup Africa Qualifier tournament in Uganda. He made his Twenty20 International (T20I) debut against Namibia on 20 May 2019.
