= Michael Aboagye =

Ghanaian cricketer (born 2001)

Personal information
- Born: 31 December 2001 (age 24)
- Batting: Right-handed
- Bowling: Right-arm legbreak
- Role: Allrounder

International information
- National side: Ghana
- T20I debut (cap 2): 20 May 2019 v Namibia
- Last T20I: 18 March 2024 v Uganda
- Source: Cricinfo, 31 August 2025

Michael Aboagye (born 31 December 2001) is a Ghanaian cricketer. He was named in Ghana's squad for the 2017 ICC World Cricket League Division Five tournament in South Africa. He played in Ghana's second fixture, against Vanuatu, on 4 September 2017.

In May 2019, he was named in Ghana's squad for the Regional Finals of the 2018–19 ICC T20 World Cup Africa Qualifier tournament in Uganda. He made his Twenty20 International (T20I) debut against Namibia on 20 May 2019. He was the leading run-scorer for Ghana in the Regional Finals, with 47 runs in three matches.
