= Isaac Aboagye =

Ghanaian cricketer (born 1995)

Personal information
- Full name: Isaac Kofi Otuafo Aboagye
- Born: 27 December 1995 (age 30)
- Batting: Right-handed
- Bowling: Right-arm medium

International information
- National side: Ghana
- T20I debut (cap 1): 20 May 2019 v Namibia
- Last T20I: 23 May 2019 v Uganda
- Source: Cricinfo, 23 May 2019

Isaac Aboagye (born 27 December 1995) is a Ghanaian cricketer. He was named in Ghana's squad for the 2017 ICC World Cricket League Division Five tournament in South Africa. He played in Ghana's opening fixture, against Germany, on 3 September 2017.

In April 2018, he captained Ghana during the 2018–19 ICC World Twenty20 Africa Qualifier tournament. He finished the tournament as Ghana's leading wicket-taker, with eight dismissals in five games.

In May 2019, he was named as the captain of Botswana's squad for the Regional Finals of the 2018–19 ICC T20 World Cup Africa Qualifier tournament in Uganda. He made his Twenty20 International (T20I) debut against Namibia on 20 May 2019.
