= Godfred Bakiweyem =

Ghanaian cricketer (born 1998)

Personal information
- Born: 20 December 1998 (age 27)
- Batting: Right-handed
- Bowling: Right-arm medium

International information
- National side: Ghana
- T20I debut (cap 12): 21 May 2019 v Kenya
- Last T20I: 26 September 2024 v Mali
- Source: Cricinfo, 25 August 2025

Godfred Bakiweyem (born 20 December 1998) is a Ghanaian cricketer.

== Career ==
He was named in Ghana's squad for the 2017 ICC World Cricket League Division Five tournament in South Africa. He played in Ghana's opening fixture, against Germany, on 3 September 2017.

In May 2019, he was named in Ghana's squad for the Regional Finals of the 2018–19 ICC T20 World Cup Africa Qualifier tournament in Uganda. He made his Twenty20 International (T20I) debut against Kenya on 21 May 2019. He was named in Ghana's squad for the 2021 ICC Men's T20 World Cup Africa Qualifier tournament in Rwanda. He was also named in Ghana's squad for the 2022–23 ICC Men's T20 World Cup Africa Qualifier tournament in Rwanda.

On 17 December 2023, during a group stage match against Sierra Leone at the 2023 ACA Africa T20 Cup, he was dismissed in timed out manner and became only the second player ever in international cricket history to be timed out after Sri Lanka's Angelo Mathews was declared dismissed in this manner the previous month, on 6 November 2023. His confusion to reach the crease could have possibly arisen from score ticker on the live stream incorrectly showing that the over has ended, though one ball was left to be bowled. A Sierra Leone fielder rushed to the umpire who then looked into his watch. He was supposed to bat at number seven position in the match and he was timed out without facing any delivery. He then became the first player to be timed out in T20I cricket. After he was dismissed, a Sierra Leonean fielder was seen tapping into his watch; possibly as a celebration, send-off or mockery. Earlier in the same game, Bakiwenyem was involved in another unusual dismissal. After delivering the ball, he attempted to field it and run out batter Abbas Gbla, who was attempting a quick single. However, as Bakwenyam bent to pick up the ball, Gbla veered back into its path and made contact with it using his leg, preventing the run-out. The impact left Bakwenyam in visible discomfort, as he was seen wringing his hand afterward, and Gbla was given out obstructing the field.
