= David Ankrah =

Nigerian cricketer (born 1998)

Personal information
- Full name: David Ni Ashong Ankrah
- Born: 5 December 1998 (age 27)
- Batting: Right-handed
- Bowling: Right-arm medium

International information
- National sides: Ghana (2019); Nigeria (2025–present)
- T20I debut (cap 4/35): 20 May 2019; Ghana v Namibia
- Last T20I: 27 July 2025; Nigeria v Kenya
- Source: Cricinfo, 30 August 2025

David Ankrah (born 5 December 1998) is a Ghanaian–Nigerian cricketer who currently plays for Nigeria in international cricket, he also previously played for Ghana in six T20Is.

== International career ==
=== Ghana ===
He was named in Ghana's squad for the 2017 ICC World Cricket League Division Five tournament in South Africa. He played in Ghana's opening fixture, against Germany, on 3 September 2017.

In May 2019, he was named in Ghana's squad for the Regional Finals of the 2018–19 ICC T20 World Cup Africa Qualifier tournament in Uganda. He made his Twenty20 International (T20I) debut against Namibia on 20 May 2019.

=== Nigeria ===
In July 2025, he was part of Nigeria's side for the 2025 Pearl of Africa T20 Series. He made his T20I debut for Nigeria on 18 July 2025, against Uganda. In September 2025, he was named in Nigeria's squad for the 2025 Africa Regional Finals in Zimbabwe.
