= Kyambogo Cricket Oval =

Cricket ground

- Interactive map of Kyambogo Cricket Oval

Ground information
- Location: Kampala, Uganda
- Country: Uganda
- Coordinates: 0°20′42″N 32°37′35″E

International information
- First T20I: 20 May 2019: Kenya v Nigeria
- Last T20I: 23 May 2019: Uganda v Ghana
- First WT20I: 7 April 2019: Uganda v Kenya
- Last WT20I: 7 April 2019: Uganda v Zimbabwe
- As of 4 September 2020; Source: Cricinfo

The Kyambogo Cricket Oval is a cricket ground in Kampala, Uganda. It hosted matches in the 2017 ICC World Cricket League Division Three tournament, as well as in the Regional Finals of the 2018–19 ICC World Twenty20 Africa Qualifier tournament in May 2019.

== International record ==
=== Twenty20 International five-wicket hauls ===
One T20I five-wicket haul has been recorded at this venue.

| # | Figures | Player | Country | Innings | Opponent | Date | Result |
|---|---|---|---|---|---|---|---|
| 1 | 5/9 | Christi Viljoen | Namibia | 1 | Botswana | 22 May 2019 | Won |

== See also ==
- Lugogo Stadium
- Entebbe Cricket Oval
