= Pushpak Kerai =

Kenyan cricketer (born 1996)

Personal information
- Full name: Pushpak Kerai
- Born: 5 March 1996 (age 30); Nairobi, Kenya

International information
- National side: Kenya
- T20I debut (cap 27): 20 May 2019 v Nigeria
- Last T20I: 27 October 2019 v PNG
- Source: Cricinfo, 27 October 2019

Pushpak Kerai (born 8 March 1996) is a Kenyan cricketer. He made his Twenty20 debut for Kenya in the 2017 Africa T20 Cup on 8 September 2017. He made his List A debut for Kenya against the Netherlands in the 2015–17 ICC World Cricket League Championship on 6 October 2017.

In September 2018, he was named in Kenya's squad for the 2018 Africa T20 Cup. The following month, he was named in Kenya's squad for the 2018 ICC World Cricket League Division Three tournament in Oman.

In May 2019, he was named in Kenya's squad for the Regional Finals of the 2018–19 ICC T20 World Cup Africa Qualifier tournament in Uganda. He made his Twenty20 International (T20I) debut for Kenya against Nigeria on 20 May 2019. In September 2019, he was named in Kenya's squad for the 2019 ICC T20 World Cup Qualifier tournament in the United Arab Emirates.
