= Simon Ateak =

Ghanaian cricketer (born 1993)

Personal information
- Born: 22 September 1993 (age 33)
- Batting: Right-handed
- Bowling: Right-arm off break

International information
- National side: Ghana
- T20I debut (cap 5): 20 May 2019 v Namibia
- Last T20I: 22 May 2019 v Nigeria
- Source: Cricinfo, 22 May 2019

Simon Ateak (born 22 September 1993) is a Ghanaian cricketer, who plays for the national team. He was part of Ghana's squad for the 2017 ICC World Cricket League Division Five tournament in South Africa. He played in Ghana's opening fixture, against Germany, on 3 September 2017.

In April 2018, he was named the man of the match in Ghana's second and third fixtures of the 2018 ICC World Twenty20 African Sub Regional Qualifier tournament. He was also named the player of the tournament.

In May 2019, Ateak was named in Ghana's squad for the Regional Finals of the 2018–19 ICC T20 World Cup Africa Qualifier tournament in Uganda. He made his Twenty20 International (T20I) debut against Namibia on 20 May 2019.
