= List of Ghana Twenty20 International cricketers =

This is a list of Ghanaian Twenty20 International cricketers.

In April 2018, the International Cricket Council (ICC) decided to grant full Twenty20 International (T20I) status to all its members. Therefore, all Twenty20 matches played between Ghana and other ICC members after 1 January 2019 will be eligible to have T20I status.

This list comprises all members of the Ghana cricket team who have played at least one T20I match. It is initially arranged in the order in which each player won his first Twenty20 cap. Where more than one player won their first Twenty20 cap in the same match, those players are listed alphabetically by surname. Ghana played their first T20I match on 20 May 2019 against Namibia at the ICC T20 World Cup Africa Qualifier Finals.

== Key ==
General

- ‡ – Captain
- † – Wicket-keeper
- First – Year of debut
- Last – Year of latest game
- Mat – Number of matches played

Batting

- Runs – Runs scored in career
- HS – Highest score
- Avg – Runs scored per dismissal
- 50 – Number of half centuries
- 100 – Centuries scored
- * – Batsman remained not out

Bowling

- Balls – Balls bowled in career
- Wkt – Wickets taken in career
- BBI – Best bowling in an innings
- Ave – Average runs per wicket

Fielding

- Ca – Catches taken
- St – Stumpings affected

== List of players ==
Statistics are correct as of 26 September 2026.

Ghana T20I cricketers
General					Batting					Bowling					Fielding		Ref
No.	Name	First	Last	Mat	Runs	HS	Avg	50	100	Balls	Wkt	BBI	Ave	5WI	Ca	St	Ref
1	Isaac Aboagye‡	2019	2026	7	26	9	4.33	0	0	156	12	3/6	9.66	0	6	0	
2	Michael Aboagye	2019	2024	14	99	24	8.25	0	0	192	9	3/21	23.77	0	1	0	
3	Daniel Anefie	2019	2023	36	246	46	10.69	0	0	492	20	3/10	24.00	0	13	0	
4	David Ankrah (Note: David Ankrah also played Twenty20 International matches for Nigeria. Only his record for Ghana is given above.)	2019	2019	4	22	12	7.33	0	0	72	2	1/21	42.50	0	0	0	
5	Simon Ateak	2019	2019	3	45	26	15.00	0	0	–	–	–	–	–	0	0	
6	Vincent Ateak	2019	2026	15	8	5	8.00	0	0	291	13	2/4	22.23	0	4	0	
7	Frank Baaleri†	2019	2026	13	107	20	15.28	0	0	–	–	–	–	–	9	2	
8	Kofi Bagabena†	2019	2024	45	133	23*	9.50	0	0	643	35	5/9	19.60	1	16	0	
9	Rexford Bakum	2019	2024	42	706	71	19.08	4	0	299	21	5/26	17.09	1	15	0	
10	Julius Mensah†	2019	2019	2	17	16	8.50	0	0	–	–	–	–	–	0	0	
11	Lakmal Perera	2019	2019	2	10	7	5.00	0	0	–	–	–	–	–	1	0	
12	Godfred Bakiweyem	2019	2024	41	153	41*	10.20	0	0	692	35	3/16	21.51	0	15	0	
13	James Vifah	2019	2024	31	496	63*	17.71	3	0	101	6	2/21	19.00	0	4	0	
14	Moses Anafie	2021	2021	10	89	41*	14.83	0	0	114	7	2/32	19.42	0	3	0	
15	Samson Awiah‡	2021	2024	40	559	96*	18.63	2	0	301	19	5/23	18.31	1	10	0	
16	Devender Singh	2021	2026	26	287	47*	20.50	0	0	–	–	–	–	–	5	0	
17	Obed Harvey‡	2021	2026	50	751	107*	19.25	1	1	1041	62	5/36	14.53	1	10	0	
18	Amoluk Singh	2021	2022	15	332	80*	27.66	2	0	162	5	2/23	34.00	0	3	0	
19	Joseph Theodore†	2021	2026	42	245	60*	9.42	1	0	–	–	–	–	–	23	8	
20	Francis Bakiweyem	2021	2021	3	13	11*	6.50	0	0	–	–	–	–	–	1	0	
21	Aziz Sualley	2021	2024	13	13	4*	3.25	0	0	102	5	2/25	22.40	0	3	0	
22	Richmond Baaleri	2021	2026	30	373	56*	17.76	2	0	339	22	5/29	19.40	1	9	0	
23	Kelvin Awala	2022	2023	17	145	23*	10.35	0	0	–	–	–	–	–	1	0	
24	Gagandeep Singh	2022	2022	2	4	3*	–	0	0	24	0	–	–	0	0	0	
25	Alex Osei†	2022	2026	19	222	72	14.80	1	0	6	0	–	–	0	1	1	
26	Paul Ayoleyine	2022	2023	6	0	0	0.00	0	0	–	–	–	–	–	1	0	
27	Syed Aqeel Israr	2023	2024	10	14	10*	4.66	0	0	165	9	2/20	17.66	0	0	0	
28	Nurudeen Ibrahim	2023	2023	1	0	0	0.00	0	0	–	–	–	–	–	0	0	
29	Philip Yevugah	2023	2026	13	41	15	4.55	0	0	60	0	–	–	0	4	0	
30	Lee Nyarko	2024	2026	9	4	4*	2.00	0	0	148	9	3/3	11.00	0	5	0	
31	Peter Ananya	2024	2024	4	19	18*	9.50	0	0	–	–	–	–	–	0	0	
32	Enoch Frimpong	2024	2024	4	6	6*	6.00	0	0	60	4	3/4	7.75	0	0	0	
33	Jayant Gautam	2026	2026	8	159	44*	22.71	0	0	–	–	–	–	–	2	0	
34	Bharani Majji	2026	2026	4	77	30	25.66	0	0	47	5	3/11	6.40	0	0	0	
35	Nitesh Hooda	2026	2026	8	32	13*	10.66	0	0	126	11	3/16	12.00	0	0	0	
36	Judah Solomon	2026	2026	6	38	35	9.50	0	0	66	1	1/15	89.00	0	2	0	
37	Shijo Devasia	2026	2026	1	–	–	–	–	–	18	1	1/15	15.00	0	0	0	
38	Ayushmaan Mishra	2026	2026	4	6	4	3.00	0	0	24	2	2/25	12.50	0	1	0	
39	Prince Adotei	2026	2026	2	–	–	–	–	–	–	–	–	–	–	0	0	
40	David Ateak	2026	2026	3	3	2	3.00	0	0	–	–	–	–	–	0	0	
