= Zephania Arinaitwe =

Ugandan cricketer

Personal information
- Full name: Zephania Arinaitwe
- Born: 4 December 2001 (age 24)
- Batting: Right-handed
- Bowling: Right-arm offbreak

International information
- National side: Uganda
- T20I debut (cap 1): 20 May 2019 v Botswana
- Last T20I: 15 February 2020 v Qatar
- Source: Cricinfo, 15 February 2020

Zephania Arinaitwe (born 4 December 2001) is a Ugandan cricketer. In September 2018, he was named in Uganda's squad for the 2018 Africa T20 Cup. He made his Twenty20 debut for Uganda in the 2018 Africa T20 Cup on 14 September 2018.

In March 2019, he was named in Uganda's squad for the Africa Division 1 qualifier tournament for the 2020 Under-19 Cricket World Cup. In Uganda's final match of the qualifier, against Tanzania, Arinaitwe scored an unbeaten 102 from 40 balls, and was named the player of the match.

In May 2019, he was named in Uganda's squad for the Regional Finals of the 2018–19 ICC T20 World Cup Africa Qualifier tournament in Uganda. He made his Twenty20 International (T20I) debut for Uganda against Botswana on 20 May 2019. In July 2019, he was one of twenty-five players named in the Ugandan training squad, ahead of the Cricket World Cup Challenge League fixtures in Hong Kong.
