= James Moses (cricketer) =

Botswana cricketer

Personal information
- Full name: James Walton Nathaniel Moses
- Born: 8 August 1965 (age 61); Antigua, Antigua and Barbuda
- Batting: Right-handed
- Bowling: Right-arm Medium

International information
- National side: Botswana
- T20I debut (cap 6): 20 May 2019 v Uganda
- Last T20I: 7 November 2021 v Tanzania

Career statistics
Competition	T20I
Matches	7
Runs scored	45
Batting average	7.50
100s/50s	0/0
Top score	20
Balls bowled	48
Wickets	0
Bowling average	–
5 wickets in innings	–
10 wickets in match	–
Best bowling	–
Catches/stumpings	2/–
- Source: Cricinfo, 9 November 2021

James Walton Nathaniel Moses (born 8 August 1965) is an Antiguan-born Botswana cricketer.

== Career ==
Moses represented Botswana in the 2002 Africa Cricket Association Cup in Zambia. He captained Botswana in the 2011 ICC Africa Twenty20 Division Two.

He played in the 2015 ICC World Cricket League Division Six tournament. In October 2018, he represented Botswana in the Southern sub region group in the 2018–19 ICC World Twenty20 Africa Qualifier tournament. In the final match of the group, against Namibia, he was named the man of the match for his all-round performance, with Botswana finishing top of the group.

In May 2019, he was named in Botswana's squad for the Regional Finals of the 2018–19 ICC T20 World Cup Africa Qualifier tournament in Uganda. He made his Twenty20 International (T20I) debut against Uganda on 20 May 2019, becoming the oldest player to debut in a T20I as well as the oldest player to play a T20I match.

In October 2021, he was named in Botswana's squad for their matches in Group B of the 2021 ICC Men's T20 World Cup Africa Qualifier tournament in Rwanda.
