= Karabo Motlhanka =

Botswana cricketer

Personal information
- Born: 17 April 1992 (age 34); Gaborone, Botswana
- Batting: Left-handed
- Bowling: Unknown
- Role: Occasional wicket-keeper

International information
- National side: Botswana
- T20I debut (cap 7): 20 May 2019 v Uganda
- Last T20I: 12 December 2023 v Ghana

Domestic team information
- Years: Team
- 2021/22: Matabeleland Tuskers

Career statistics
Competition	T20I	FC	T20
Matches	58	2	61
Runs scored	1355	89	1371
Batting average	26.56	29.66	25.38
100s/50s	0/8	0/0	0/8
Top score	84	41	84
Balls bowled	276	0	276
Wickets	20	–	20
Bowling average	15.35	–	15.35
5 wickets in innings	0	–	0
10 wickets in match	–	–	–
Best bowling	4/16	–	4/16
Catches/stumpings	19/4	9/–	19/4
- Source: Cricinfo, 14 October 2025

Karabo Motlhanka (born 17 April 1992) is a Botswana cricketer. He played in the 2015 ICC World Cricket League Division Six tournament.

Motlhanka was appointed captain of Botswana at the age of 23. In October 2018, he captained the Botswana team in the Southern sub region group in the 2018–19 ICC World Twenty20 Africa Qualifier tournament. In the opening match of the tournament, he scored an unbeaten fifty and was named the man of the match. He was the leading run-scorer for Botswana in the tournament, with 196 runs in six matches.

In May 2019, he was named as the captain of Botswana's squad for the Regional Finals of the 2018–19 ICC T20 World Cup Africa Qualifier tournament in Uganda. He made his Twenty20 International (T20I) debut against Uganda on 20 May 2019. In October 2021, he was named as the captain of Botswana's squad for their matches in Group B of the 2021 ICC Men's T20 World Cup Africa Qualifier tournament in Rwanda.

He made his first-class debut on 17 January 2022, playing for the Tuskers in the 2021–22 Logan Cup in Zimbabwe. He had been called up to play in Zimbabwe, after several of the Tuskers' squad were part of Zimbabwe's tour of Sri Lanka during January 2022

Motlhanka is currently playing in the UK for Cleeve Cricket club, having joined as the club's overseas signing on 25 April 2025.
