= List of Botswana Twenty20 International cricketers =

This is a list of Botswanan Twenty20 International cricketers.

In April 2018, the International Cricket Council (ICC) decided to grant full Twenty20 International (T20I) status to all its members. Therefore, all Twenty20 matches played between Botswana and other ICC members after 1 January 2019 will be eligible for T20I status.

This list comprises all members of the Botswana cricket team who have played at least one T20I match. It is initially arranged in the order in which each player won his first Twenty20 cap. Where more than one player won his first Twenty20 cap in the same match, those players are listed alphabetically by surname. Botswana played their first T20I match on 20 May 2019 against Uganda at the ICC T20 World Cup Africa Qualifier Finals.

== Key ==
General

- ‡ – Captain
- † – Wicket-keeper
- First – Year of debut
- Last – Year of latest game
- Mat – Number of matches played

Batting

- Runs – Runs scored in career
- HS – Highest score
- Avg – Runs scored per dismissal
- * – Batsman remained not out
- 50 – Half-centuries scored
- 100 – Centuries scored

Bowling

- Balls – Balls bowled in career
- Wkt – Wickets taken in career
- BBI – Best bowling in an innings
- Ave – Average runs per wicket

Fielding

- Ca – Catches taken
- St – Stumpings affected

== List of players ==
Statistics are correct as of 18 September 2026.

Botswana T20I cricketers
General					Batting					Bowling				Fielding		Ref
No.	Name	First	Last	Mat	Runs	HS	Avg	50	100	Balls	Wkt	BBI	Ave	Ca	St	Ref
1	Vinoo Balakrishnan	2019	2026	59	1244	101	24.88	5	2	127	8	2/11	14.25	15	0	
2	Inzimamul Master	2019	2022	6	49	40	9.80	0	0	30	0	–	–	3	0	
3	Nabil Master	2019	2026	8	76	35*	25.33	0	0	112	11	6/2	10.54	0	0	
4	Karabo Modise	2019	2025	11	149	38	13.54	0	0	73	6	3/18	11.00	2	0	
5	Mmoloki Mooketsi	2019	2026	64	61	10	3.58	0	0	1,340	75	4/16	18.16	15	0	
6	James Moses	2019	2021	7	45	20	7.50	0	0	48	0	–	–	2	0	
7	Karabo Motlhanka‡†	2019	2026	64	1,629	112*	30.16	9	1	300	21	4/16	15.76	19	4	
8	Reginald Nehonde	2019	2026	59	906	63	21.57	3	0	323	19	4/7	20.42	21	0	
9	Tharindu Perera	2019	2025	35	574	48*	22.96	0	0	312	16	4/21	28.06	14	0	
10	Adithiya Rangaswamy	2019	2021	8	13	7	3.25	0	0	142	11	4/21	12.90	1	0	
11	Thatayaone Tshose	2019	2026	63	589	60	14.02	1	0	742	34	3/30	26.67	25	0	
12	Dhruv Maisuria	2019	2026	53	147	32*	8.16	0	0	1017	87	5/18	11.51	20	0	
13	Zain Abbasi	2019	2022	4	21	16	5.25	0	0	24	1	1/7	16.00	0	0	
14	Tshepo Phaswana‡	2019	2019	1	0	0	0.00	0	0	–	–	–	–	0	0	
15	Ameer Saiyed	2019	2026	25	386	55	17.54	1	0	105	3	1/12	45.00	2	0	
16	Dimpho Kegasitswe	2019	2019	4	5	4*	–	0	0	72	2	1/43	78.00	0	0	
17	Boemo Khumalo	2019	2026	43	54	10*	10.80	0	0	652	28	3/14	28.82	14	0	
18	Valentine Mbazo†	2019	2026	57	534	50	11.86	1	0	–	–	–	–	25	18	
19	Hemal Pragji	2019	2019	4	38	30*	12.66	0	0	–	–	–	–	0	0	
20	Phemelo Silas	2019	2026	57	515	43	15.14	0	0	12	0	–	–	31	0	
21	Sooraj Kollery	2022	2022	2	31	29	31.00	0	0	12	0	–	–	0	0	
22	Boteng Maphosa	2022	2023	10	36	18	18.00	0	0	88	2	1/10	62.50	3	0	
23	Leano Maphane	2022	2026	9	83	20	9.22	0	0	7	0	1/0	15.00	3	0	
24	Katlo Piet	2022	2026	55	171	22*	8.55	0	0	933	56	4/12	17.28	21	0	
25	Boemo Kgosiemang	2022	2026	33	36	10*	18.00	0	0	501	21	3/26	32.19	8	0	
26	Rod Mbaiwa†	2022	2023	3	3	3	2.50	0	0	–	–	–	–	3	3	
27	Losika Makgale	2023	2026	10	1	1*	0.50	0	0	136	8	2/3	16.25	3	0	
28	Michael Badenhorst	2023	2024	11	44	17*	8.80	0	0	143	8	4/21	24.75	0	0	
29	Monroux Kasselman	2023	2026	37	732	102	23.61	5	1	18	0	–	–	17	3	
30	Reynier Swart	2023	2023	4	7	6*	3.50	0	0	53	4	2/9	13.25	0	0	
31	William Nkosana	2023	2023	1	–	–	–	–	–	–	–	–	–	0	0	
32	Tumelo Mpatane	2024	2026	8	0	0	0.00	0	0	78	3	2/46	43.66	2	0	
33	Botlhe Keganne	2025	2026	10	67	42	13.40	0	0	120	7	2/15	22.71	2	0	
34	Abednico Motshegetsi	2025	2025	2	0	0*	–	0	0	12	0	–	–	0	0	
35	Jack Richards	2025	2025	2	8	7*	–	0	0	4	0	–	–	0	0	
36	Lahiru Perera†	2026	2026	3	28	17	14.00	0	0	–	–	–	–	0	1	
37	Brandon van Zyl	2026	2026	8	49	22	9.80	0	0	150	10	3/23	12.60	3	0	
38	Dev Senthil	2026	2026	1	7	7	7.00	0	0	–	–	–	–	0	0	
39	Ryan Adams	2026	2026	5	17	10	4.25	0	0	36	0	–	–	1	0	
40	Myolisi Fumba	2026	2026	1	4	4	4.00	0	0	12	0	–	–	0	0	
