= Namibian cricket team in Ireland in 2011 =

Namibia cricket team in Ireland in 2011
	Ireland	Namibia
- Dates: 28 June – 9 September 2011
Captains	William Porterfield	Craig Williams

LA series
- Result: Ireland won the 2-match series 2–0
Most runs	Niall O'Brien (95)	Nicholaas Scholtz (71)
Most wickets	George Dockrell (4)	Christi Viljoen (4)

The Namibia cricket team toured Ireland from 28 June to 9 September 2011. The tour consisted of one ICC Intercontinental Cup match and a pair of List A matches.

== Intercontinental Cup ==
6–9 September 2011
Scorecard

Namibia	v	Ireland
244 (70.1 overs); Louis van der Westhuizen 65 (54); George Dockrell 5/71 (22 overs)		298 (83.5 overs); Andrew White 123* (213); Christi Viljoen 5/87 (23.5 overs)
226 (79.3 overs); Christi Viljoen 87 (136); George Dockrell 3/41 (22.3 overs)		176/5 (40.2 overs); Paul Stirling 53 (44); Louis van der Westhuizen 2/21 (6 overs)

Ireland won by 5 wickets
Civil Service Cricket Club Ground, Belfast, Northern Ireland
Umpires: Buddhi Pradhan (Nep) and Richard Smith (Ger)

- Ireland won the toss and elected to field
- The game was originally scheduled for 28 June – 1 July but was postponed due to visa issues.

== Intercontinental Cup One-Day ==
=== 1st List A ===
4 July 2011
Scorecard

Ireland; 241 (49.5 overs)	v	Namibia; 215 (48.4 overs)
John Mooney 86 (73); Christi Viljoen 3/38 (10 overs)		Gerrie Snyman 60 (100); Alex Cusack 3/29 (7.4 overs)

Ireland won by 26 runs
Civil Service Cricket Club, Stormont, Belfast
Umpires: Johanes Cloete (RSA) & Richard Smith (IRE)

- Ireland won the toss and elected to bat.
- Points: Ireland 2, Namibia 0.

=== 2nd List A ===
5 July 2011
Scorecard

Namibia; 175 (36 overs)	v	Ireland; 176/2 (30.2 overs)
Nicholaas Scholtz 35* (29); John Mooney 3/31 (7 overs)		Alex Cusack 59* (55); Christi Viljoen 1/29 (8 overs)

Ireland won by 8 wickets
Civil Service Cricket Club, Stormont, Belfast
Umpires: Johanes Cloete (RSA) & Richard Smith (IRE)

- Namibia won the toss and elected to bat.
- Points: Ireland 2, Namibia 0.
