= Niko Davin =

Namibian cricketer (born 1997)

Personal information
- Full name: Nikolaas Davin
- Born: 19 December 1997 (age 28)
- Batting: Right-handed
- Bowling: Legbreak
- Role: Batter

International information
- National side: Namibia
- ODI debut (cap 39): 26 March 2023 v United States
- Last ODI: 19 February 2024 v Netherlands
- T20I debut (cap 3): 20 May 2019 v Ghana
- Last T20I: 30 November 2023 v Nigeria

Career statistics
Competition	ODI	T20I	FC	LA
Matches	7	27	4	21
Runs scored	170	779	297	362
Batting average	24.28	31.16	37.12	20.11
100s/50s	0/1	0/5	0/2	0/3
Top score	90	89	85	90
Catches/stumpings	4/–	11/–	1/–	13/–
- Source: Cricinfo, 20 February 2024

Nikolaas Davin (born 19 December 1997) is a Namibian cricketer. In January 2016 he was named in Namibia's squad for the 2016 Under-19 Cricket World Cup. In June 2024, he became the first batsman to have ever been dismissed in "retired out" fashion in the history of ICC Men's T20 World Cup.

== Career ==
He made his List A debut on 11 October 2015 in the CSA Provincial One-Day Challenge tournament. He made his first-class debut for Namibia in the 2017–18 Sunfoil 3-Day Cup on 11 January 2018. In August 2018, he was named in Namibia's squad for the 2018 Africa T20 Cup, and in October 2018 in Namibia's squad in the Southern sub region group for the 2018–19 ICC World Twenty20 Africa Qualifier tournament in Botswana.

In May 2019, he was named in Namibia's squad for the Regional Finals of the 2018–19 ICC T20 World Cup Africa Qualifier tournament in Uganda. He made his Twenty20 International (T20I) debut for Namibia against Ghana on 20 May 2019. He was the leading run-scorer for Namibia in the Regional Finals, with 86 runs in three matches.

In June 2019, he was one of twenty-five cricketers to be named in Cricket Namibia's Elite Men's Squad ahead of the 2019–20 international season. In September 2019, he was named in Namibia's squad for the 2019 ICC T20 World Cup Qualifier tournament in the United Arab Emirates.

In March 2023, he was named in Namibia's squad for the 2023 Cricket World Cup Qualifier Play-off. He made his One Day International (ODI) debut for Namibia against the United States on 26 March 2023.

In May 2024, he was named in Namibia's squad for the 2024 ICC Men's T20 World Cup tournament. During the group stage match between Namibia and England held at Sir Vivian Richards Stadium in the 2024 ICC T20 Cricket World Cup, Davin became the first batter to be dismissed retired out in a T20 World Cup match. Davin who came in as the opening batsman for Namibia in the run chase, then announced himself that he was leaving the field during the 6th over of the Namibian innings while he was still batting with an unbeaten score of 18 runs off 16 balls. Namibia were left to chase a revised target of 126 runs in 10 overs in a rain-curtailed match, and as a result, he made himself retire out considering the circumstances Namibia were reeling at and to make a case for another batter to capitalize on the required run rate in order to score runs in a quick manner.
