= Wynand Louw =

Namibian cricket umpire

Personal information
- Born: 18 May 1961 (age 65); Windhoek, South West Africa
- Relatives: Andrew Louw (son)

Umpiring information
- FC umpired: 39 (2006–2017)
- LA umpired: 29 (2005–2017)
- T20 umpired: 23 (2010–2014)
- Source: CricketArchive, 1 October 2024

Andrew Wynand Louw (born 18 May 1961) is a Namibian cricket umpire who is on the ICC Associates and Affiliates Umpire Panel. He made his first-class umpiring debut in 2006, and regularly umpires in International Cricket Council (ICC) tournaments and other competitions in which the Namibian national side participates.

Born in Windhoek, before taking up umpiring Louw was the head groundsman for Cricket Namibia, responsible for the upkeep of most major pitches in the country. His first international tournament as an umpire was a Central and Southern Africa under-15 tournament in September 2005. Louw stood in at first-class and list-A level for the first time during the 2006–07 season, when Namibia played in the CSA Provincial Competitions against South African sides. Louw has since umpired almost of Namibia's home fixtures in South African tournaments, as well as home ICC Intercontinental Cup games and matches against touring international sides. His duties have also included roles at ICC Africa and World Cricket League tournaments, including competitions played in South Africa, Swaziland, Botswana, Uganda, Malaysia, and Tanzania.

Louw has served on the 11-member ICC Associates and Affiliates Umpire Panel since 2013 and was re-appointed in January 2015 as one of two representatives from the Africa region (alongside Kenyan David Odhiambo). His son, Andrew Louw, played a single first-class match for Namibia in 2009 and later qualified as an umpire himself, making his first-class umpiring debut in April 2013. The pair officiated a 12-a-side game between Namibia A and Kenya in November 2014, and they also stood together in a 20-over match between Namibia and Hong Kong in May 2015, which had full Twenty20 status.
