= Zhivago Groenewald =

Namibian cricketer

Personal information
- Born: 8 June 1993 (age 33); Walvis Bay, Namibia
- Batting: Left-handed

International information
- National side: Namibia
- ODI debut (cap 27): 17 September 2019 v United States
- Last ODI: 23 September 2019 v PNG
- T20I debut (cap 7): 20 May 2019 v Ghana
- Last T20I: 2 November 2019 v Ireland
- Source: ESPNcricinfo, 2 November 2019

Zhivago Groenewald (born 8 June 1993) is a Namibian former cricketer. He was initially selected as part of Namibia's squad for the 2015 ICC World Twenty20 Qualifier tournament, but was replaced by Michau du Preez.

== Career ==
In October 2018, Groenewald was named in Namibia's squad in the Southern sub region group for the 2018–19 ICC World Twenty20 Africa Qualifier tournament in Botswana. He was the joint-leading wicket-taker in the tournament, with fourteen dismissals in six matches. In March 2019, he was named in Namibia's squad for the 2019 ICC World Cricket League Division Two tournament.

In May 2019, he was included in Namibia's squad for the Regional Finals of the 2018–19 ICC T20 World Cup Africa Qualifier tournament in Uganda. Groenewald made his Twenty20 International (T20I) debut against Ghana on 20 May 2019.

In June 2019, he was among the 25 cricketers to be named in Cricket Namibia's Elite Men's Squad ahead of the 2019–20 international season. In August 2019, he was named in Namibia's One Day International (ODI) squad for the 2019 United States Tri-Nation Series. He made his ODI debut for Namibia, against the United States, on 17 September 2019. On 20 September 2019, in the match against the United States, he took his first five-wicket haul in ODI cricket.

Later the same month, Groenewald was named in Namibia's squad for the 2019 ICC T20 World Cup Qualifier tournament in the United Arab Emirates.

In 2021, Groenewald retired from cricket at the end of the home season in Namibia, following a knee injury.
