= Tangeni Lungameni =

Namibian cricketer

Personal information
- Born: 17 April 1992 (age 34); Gobabis, Namibia
- Batting: Left-handed
- Bowling: Left-arm medium
- Role: Bowler

International information
- National side: Namibia (2019–present)
- ODI debut (cap 34): 6 March 2022 v Oman
- Last ODI: 26 November 2022 v USA
- T20I debut (cap 8): 20 May 2019 v Ghana
- Last T20I: 30 October 2023 v Zimbabwe
- Source: CricketArchive, 29 November 2022

Tangeni Lungameni (born 17 April 1992) is a Namibian international cricketer who made his debut for the Namibian national team in January 2016. He is a left-arm pace bowler.

== Career ==
Lungameni is from Gobabis, but moved to Windhoek to attend Windhoek Technical School. He started playing cricket at the age of six. He spent two seasons as a member of the Namibia under-19 team, including at the 2011 Under-19 World Cup Qualifier, and made his debut for Namibia A in July 2015, against Botswana. He was not included in the squad for the 2012 Under-19 Cricket World Cup. After getting dropped, he quit cricket for a while. In 2013, he joined the Windhoek High School Old Boys Cricket Club, on request of Francois Erasmus who was then president of Cricket Namibia, and played for 4th XI of the club. Later, he became a community coach and then a head groundsman for Cricket Namibia.

In January 2016, Lungameni made his senior debut for Namibia, in a Sunfoil 3-Day Cup match against Gauteng (a South African provincial team). Later in the 2015–16 season, he also made appearances in the Provincial 50-Over Challenge and the Provincial T20 Challenge. Lungameni's international debut came in April 2016, when he played in an ICC Intercontinental Cup match against Afghanistan. Outside of playing cricket, he works as Cricket Namibia's head groundsman, having replaced Wynand Louw in the position. Lungameni is one of the few black players to play at a high level in Namibia.

In August 2018, he was named in Namibia's squad for the 2018 Africa T20 Cup. In October 2018, he was named in Namibia's squad in the Southern sub region group for the 2018–19 ICC World Twenty20 Africa Qualifier tournament in Botswana. On 29 October 2018, in the match against Mozambique, he took a hat-trick.

In March 2019, he was named in Namibia's squad for the 2019 ICC World Cricket League Division Two tournament. In May 2019, he was named in Namibia's squad for the Regional Finals of the 2018–19 ICC T20 World Cup Africa Qualifier tournament in Uganda. He made his Twenty20 International (T20I) debut for Namibia against Ghana on 20 May 2019.

In June 2019, he was one of twenty-five cricketers to be named in Cricket Namibia's Elite Men's Squad ahead of the 2019–20 international season. In August 2019, he was named in Namibia's One Day International (ODI) squad for the 2019 United States Tri-Nation Series. In September 2019, he was named in Namibia's squad for the 2019 ICC T20 World Cup Qualifier tournament in the United Arab Emirates.

In November 2021, he was named as a reserve in Namibia's One Day International (ODI) squad for the 2021 Namibia Tri-Nation Series. In March 2022, he was named in Namibia's ODI squad for the 2022 United Arab Emirates Tri-Nation Series. He made his ODI debut on 6 March 2022, for Namibia against Oman.

In May 2024, he was named in Namibia's squad for the 2024 ICC Men's T20 World Cup tournament.
