= Lo-handre Louwrens =

Namibian cricketer (born 1999)

Personal information
- Born: 24 April 1999 (age 27); Keetmanshoop, Namibia
- Batting: Right-handed
- Role: Wicket-keeper

International information
- National side: Namibia
- ODI debut (cap 35): 14 March 2022 v Oman
- Last ODI: 15 February 2023 v Scotland
- Only T20I (cap 16): 23 August 2019 v Botswana
- Source: Cricinfo, 29 November 2022

Lo-handre Louwrens (born 24 April 1999) is a Namibian cricketer who made his international debut for the Namibia cricket team in August 2019.

== Career ==
He made his first-class debut on 8 October 2015 in the Sunfoil 3-Day Cup tournament.

In January 2016, he was named in Namibia's squad for the 2016 Under-19 Cricket World Cup. He was the leading run-scorer for Namibia in the tournament, with 163 runs. In November 2017, he was named as captain of Namibia's squad for the 2018 Under-19 Cricket World Cup. He was the leading run-scorer for Namibia in the tournament, with 258 runs.

He was a member of Namibia's squad for the 2018 ICC World Cricket League Division Two tournament. In August 2018, he was named in Namibia's squad for the 2018 Africa T20 Cup.

In October 2018, he was named in Namibia's squad in the Southern sub region group for the 2018–19 ICC World Twenty20 Africa Qualifier tournament in Botswana. On 29 October 2018, in the match against Mozambique, he became the first batsman to score a century in the group, scoring 100 from 48 balls. He was the leading run-scorer in the tournament, with 243 runs in six matches.

In June 2019, he was one of twenty-five cricketers to be named in Cricket Namibia's Elite Men's Squad ahead of the 2019–20 international season.

He made his Twenty20 International (T20I) debut for Namibia against Botswana on 23 August 2019 during Botswana's tour of Namibia. He made his One Day International (ODI) debut on 14 March 2022, for Namibia against Oman.
