= Claude Thorburn =

Namibian cricket umpire (born 1987)

Personal information
- Born: 23 February 1987 (age 39)
- Role: Umpire

Umpiring information
- ODIs umpired: 7 (2019–2022)
- T20Is umpired: 11 (2019–2021)
- Source: ESPN Cricinfo, 27 November 2021

Claude Thorburn (born 23 February 1987) is a Namibian cricket umpire. He has stood as an umpire in domestic first-class and List A matches in Namibia and South Africa. He stood in his first One Day International (ODI) match, between Papua New Guinea and the United States, in the third-place playoff in the 2019 ICC World Cricket League Division Two tournament in Namibia. His Twenty20 International (T20I) umpiring debut was in a match between Namibia and Botswana, on 20 August 2019.

== See also ==
- List of One Day International cricket umpires
- List of Twenty20 International cricket umpires
