= Divan la Cock =

Namibian cricketer (born 2003)

Personal information
- Full name: Divan la Cock
- Born: 23 February 2003 (age 23); Windhoek, Namibia
- Batting: Right-handed
- Bowling: Right-arm off-spin
- Role: Batsman

International information
- National side: Namibia
- ODI debut (cap 37): 10 July 2022 v Scotland
- Last ODI: 26 November 2022 v USA
- ODI shirt no.: 20
- T20I debut (cap 23): 17 May 2022 v Zimbabwe
- Last T20I: 18 October 2022 v Netherlands
- Source: Cricinfo, 29 November 2022

Divan la Cock (born 23 February 2003) is a Namibian cricketer. A right-handed batsman, he has played for the Namibia national under-19 cricket team, including captaining the team at the 2020 Under-19 Cricket World Cup qualifiers.

He made his List A debut on 29 March 2022, for Namibia A against Ireland Wolves, in Windhoek. In May 2022, he was named in Namibia's Twenty20 International (T20I) squad for their series against Zimbabwe. He made his T20I debut on 17 May 2022, against Zimbabwe. In July 2022, he was named in Namibia's One Day International (ODI) squad for round 14 of the 2019–2023 ICC Cricket World Cup League 2 in Scotland. He made his ODI debut on 10 July 2022, against Scotland.
