= Pikky Ya France =

Namibian cricketer (born 1990)

Personal information
- Full name: Helao Nafidi Ya France
- Born: 23 April 1990 (age 36); Windhoek, Khomas Region, Namibia
- Batting: Right-handed
- Bowling: Right-arm Off-spin(break)
- Role: Batting Allrounder

International information
- National side: Namibia
- ODI debut (cap 26): 27 April 2019 v Oman
- Last ODI: 26 November 2022 v Papua New Guinea
- T20I debut (cap 14): 19 August 2019 v Botswana
- Last T20I: 24 May 2022 v Zimbabwe

Career statistics
Competition	ODI	T20I	FC	LA
Matches	11	18	47	36
Runs scored	34	32	1,448	369
Batting average	11.33	4.57	15.91	14.19
100s/50s	0/0	0/0	0/4	0/0
Top score	11*	13	83	41
Balls bowled	312	156	1,012	462
Wickets	6	5	11	8
Bowling average	38.83	35.20	67.90	45.37
5 wickets in innings	0	0	0	0
10 wickets in match	0	0	0	0
Best bowling	2/31	1/3	2/29	2/31
Catches/stumpings	2/–	2/–	14/0	4/0
- Source: ESPNcricinfo, 29 November 2022

Helao Nafidi Ya France (born 23 April 1990) is a Namibian cricketer. Known by his nickname Pikky, Ya France is a right-handed batsman who bowls right-arm slow. He was born in Windhoek, Khomas Region.

== Career ==
=== 2008-2011: Debut ===
Having played for the Namibia Under-19 cricket team, whom he represented in the 2008 Under-19s Cricket World Cup, Ya France made his first-class debut for the senior team in March 2011. He opened the batting in the 2010/11 CSA Provincial Three-Day Competition against Gauteng, scoring 15 and 10, and made his List A the following day, and scored 13.

Ya France quickly established himself as a regular member of the side. He played in both one day matches in the tour of Ireland in July, and then took eight wickets at 12.25 in the 2011 ICC Africa Twenty20 Division One in Uganda.

In September 2011, Ya France made a marathon unbeaten half-century against Scotland to force a draw in Namibia's ICC Intercontinental Cup match. Ya France faced 225 balls for his 63 not out.

=== 2013: Racism controversy ===
In April 2013, Ya France scored 54 off 38 in the final of the Twenty20 Quadrangular to help Namibia to victory over Kenya. He was named man of the match.

In September, however, Ya France pulled out of the squad that travelled to Sharjah to play the United Arab Emirates in the ICC Intercontinental Cup. Ya France stated that he had been "constantly subjected to unfair treatment by the selectors" in being overlooked for selection in previous matches. Carlos Kambaekwa, writing for the New Era newspaper, criticized the team's "lily white lineup" and suggested that the Namibian cricket authorities were excluding and discouraging "cricketers of colour".

Ya France was back in the first-class team in October, but played only one match in the ICC World Twenty20 Qualifier in November.

=== 2015-present: Return to form ===
In October 2015, Ya France returned to form with 83 against South Western Districts. This is his highest first-class score to date.

In April 2016, Ya France top scored for Namibia in both innings against Afghanistan in the ICC Intercontinental Cup. He made 46 and 40 as Namibia lost by an innings and 36 runs. Then in September he top-scored in Namibia's victory over Western Province in the 2016 Africa T20 Cup. Namibia lost both its remaining matches, but Ya France was his team's highest run-scorer in the tournament.

In October 2018, he was named in Namibia's squad in the Southern sub region group for the 2018–19 ICC World Twenty20 Africa Qualifier tournament in Botswana. In March 2019, he was named in Namibia's squad for the 2019 ICC World Cricket League Division Two tournament. Namibia finished in the top four places in the tournament, therefore gaining One Day International (ODI) status. Ya France made his ODI debut for Namibia on 27 April 2019, against Oman, in the tournament's final.

In May 2019, he was named in Namibia's squad for the Regional Finals of the 2018–19 ICC T20 World Cup Africa Qualifier tournament in Uganda. The following month, he was one of twenty-five cricketers to be named in Cricket Namibia's Elite Men's Squad ahead of the 2019–20 international season.

He made his Twenty20 International (T20I) debut for Namibia against Botswana on 19 August 2019 during Botswana's tour of Namibia. In September 2019, he was named in Namibia's squad for the 2019 ICC T20 World Cup Qualifier tournament in the United Arab Emirates. In September 2021, he was named in Namibia's squad for the 2021 ICC Men's T20 World Cup.
