= Andrew Louw (umpire) =

Namibian cricketer (born 1987)

Personal information
- Born: 18 August 1987 (age 39); Windhoek, South-West Africa
- Batting: Right-handed
- Bowling: Right-arm off break
- Role: Umpire
- Relatives: Wynand Louw (father)

Umpiring information
- ODIs umpired: 17 (2021–2025)
- T20Is umpired: 40 (2019–2025)
- WT20Is umpired: 13 (2019–2021)

Career statistics
Competition	First-class
Matches	1
Runs scored	7
Batting average	–
100s/50s	–/–
Top score	7*
Balls bowled	72
Wickets	1
Bowling average	53.00
5 wickets in innings	–
10 wickets in match	–
Best bowling	1/23
Catches/stumpings	1/–
- Source: ESPNcricinfo, 5 April 2023

Andrew Louw (born August 18, 1987) is a Namibian cricket umpire and former international cricketer.

As a right-handed batsman and a right-arm off-break bowler, he represented the Namibian under-19 side at the 2006 Under-19 World Cup, and subsequently played a single first-class match for the senior Namibian national team, against KwaZulu-Natal Inland in 2009. Louw made his first-class umpiring debut in April 2013, and has since officiated in limited-overs and Twenty20 matches.

His father, Wynand Louw, is also an umpire, and has been on the ICC Associates and Affiliates Umpire Panel since 2013. The pair officiated a 12-a-side game between Namibia A and Kenya in November 2014, and also stood together in a 20-over match between Namibia and Hong Kong in May 2015, which had full Twenty20 status.

On 20 May 2019, he stood in his first Twenty20 International (T20I) match, between Kenya and Nigeria in Regional Finals of the 2018–19 ICC T20 World Cup Africa Qualifier tournament in Uganda.

== See also ==
- List of One Day International cricket umpires
- List of Twenty20 International cricket umpires
