= Zane Green =

Namibian cricketer (born 1996)

Personal information
- Full name: Zane Edward Green
- Born: 11 October 1996 (age 30); Windhoek, Namibia
- Batting: Left-handed
- Role: Wicket-keeper

International information
- National side: Namibia (2013–present)
- ODI debut (cap 20): 27 April 2019 v Oman
- Last ODI: 13 September 2026 v South Africa
- ODI shirt no.: 48
- T20I debut (cap 6): 20 May 2019 v Ghana
- Last T20I: 4 September 2026 v South Africa

Career statistics
Competition	ODI	T20I	FC	LA
Matches	51	73	25	87
Runs scored	942	620	664	1,592
Batting average	22.97	17.71	14.75	21.80
100s/50s	0/3	0/1	0/2	0/7
Top score	75*	52*	65	75*
Catches/stumpings	52/7	61/7	38/7	82/10
- Source: Cricinfo, 12 October 2025

Zane Edward Green (born 11 October 1996) is a Namibian cricketer who made his senior debut for the Namibian national side in September 2013, aged 16. He is a left-handed batsman and plays as a wicket-keeper.

== Personal life ==
Green was born and raised in Windhoek. He attended Pionierspark Primary School, where he played alongside Niko Davin, and Windhoek High School. He began studying sports psychology at the University of Johannesburg in 2016.

Green is a member of Namibia's Coloured community. He is a cousin of Ashley van Rooi and Marc Olivier who also played cricket for Namibia.

== Under-19 career ==
Green made his debut for the Namibian national under-19 side in December 2012, at the annual Cricket South Africa provincial under-19 tournament, and scored 50 runs from four innings. Green's next matches for the side came at the 2013 Africa Under-19 Championship tournament. He played only two games, against Uganda and Zambia, and in the latter match opened the batting with Xander Pitchers, who went on to score 161 from 143 balls.

Green was a member of Namibia's squad for the 2014 Under-19 World Cup, where he played in three matches. He scored a duck against Australia and four runs against Scotland, but against Canada scored 57 runs from 77 balls, featuring in a 93-run second-wicket stand with Malan Kruger.

At the 2015 Africa Under-19 Championship, played in Tanzania, he was appointed the captain of the national under-19 side, and went on to lead the tournament in runs, with 271 from five innings. Against Botswana, he scored 155* from 129 balls, with Namibia to win the match by 265 runs, and later also the tournament, consequently qualifying directly for the 2016 Under-19 World Cup.

In January 2016 he was named as the captain of Namibia's squad for the 2016 Under-19 Cricket World Cup.

== International career ==
Green made his senior limited-overs debut for Namibia in September 2013, in a dead rubber against the United Arab Emirates as part of the 2011–13 ICC World Cricket League Championship. Coming in fifth in the batting order, he finished with nine not out from 45 balls, as Namibia were bowled out for 80. Green's next matches for the Namibian senior side came early the following month, in the CSA Provincial Competitions. He made his first-class debut in a three-day fixture against KwaZulu-Natal Inland, and then played in the corresponding one-day fixture.

In January 2018, he was named in Namibia's squad for the 2018 ICC World Cricket League Division Two tournament.

In August 2018, he was named in Namibia's squad for the 2018 Africa T20 Cup. In October 2018, he was named in Namibia's squad in the Southern sub region group for the 2018–19 ICC World Twenty20 Africa Qualifier tournament in Botswana.

In March 2019, he was named in Namibia's squad for the 2019 ICC World Cricket League Division Two tournament. Namibia finished in the top four places in the tournament, therefore gaining One Day International (ODI) status. Green made his ODI debut for Namibia on 27 April 2019, against Oman, in the tournament's final.

In May 2019, he was named in Namibia's squad for the Regional Finals of the 2018–19 ICC T20 World Cup Africa Qualifier tournament in Uganda. He made his Twenty20 International (T20I) debut for Namibia against Ghana on 20 May 2019.

In June 2019, he was one of twenty-five cricketers to be named in Cricket Namibia's Elite Men's Squad ahead of the 2019–20 international season. In September 2019, he was named in Namibia's squad for the 2019 ICC T20 World Cup Qualifier tournament in the United Arab Emirates. In September 2021, Green was named in Namibia's squad for the 2021 ICC Men's T20 World Cup.

In May 2024, he was named in Namibia's squad for the 2024 ICC Men's T20 World Cup tournament.

In January 2026, Green was named in Namibia's squad for the 2026 T20 World Cup.
