= Gerhard Erasmus =

Namibian cricketer (born 1995)

Personal information
- Full name: Merwe Gerhard Erasmus
- Born: 11 April 1995 (age 31); Windhoek, Namibia
- Height: 1.89 m (6 ft 2 in)
- Batting: Right-handed
- Bowling: Right-arm off break
- Role: All-rounder

International information
- National side: Namibia (2019–present)
- ODI debut (cap 18): 27 April 2019 v Oman
- Last ODI: 13 September 2026 v South Africa
- T20I debut (cap 4): 20 May 2019 v Ghana
- Last T20I: 4 September 2026 v South Africa

Domestic team information
- Years: Team
- 2024–present: Gulf Giants
- 2025: Kathmandu Gorkhas

Career statistics
Competition	ODI	T20I	FC	LA
Matches	74	92	38	131
Runs scored	2,400	2,327	1,255	3,817
Batting average	36.36	33.24	20.24	35.01
100s/50s	2/19	1/16	1/3	2/30
Top score	125	100*	192	125
Balls bowled	2,002	1,125	146	2,209
Wickets	58	70	2	65
Bowling average	26.87	16.41	52.00	26.38
5 wickets in innings	2	0	0	2
10 wickets in match	0	0	0	0
Best bowling	5/28	4/20	2/46	5/28
Catches/stumpings	42/–	60/–	24/2	85/
- Source: ESPNcricinfo, 25 September 2026

Merwe Gerhard Erasmus (born 11 April 1995) is a Namibian international cricketer who is the current captain of the Namibia national cricket team.

== Early life and family ==
Merwe Gerhard Erasmus was born on 11 April 1995 in Windhoek, Namibia. His father Francois Erasmus runs a family law firm in Windhoek and is a former president of Cricket Namibia and associate director of the International Cricket Council (ICC). As of 2018, Erasmus was a fourth-year law student at the University of Stellenbosch in South Africa.

== Career ==
Erasmus first played at senior level for Namibia in February 2011, aged 15, against a touring Marylebone Cricket Club (MCC) side. He made his international and first-class debut against Ireland in September 2011 in the 2011–2013 ICC Intercontinental Cup, and at the age of 16, became the youngest player in the team's history. He was a member of Namibia's squad for the 2012 ICC World Twenty20 Qualifier.

Erasmus was included in the Namibia under-19s squad for the 2012 Under-19 Cricket World Cup in Australia. He captained the team at the 2014 Under-19 Cricket World Cup in the United Arab Emirates.

Erasmus played in Namibia's squad for the 2018 ICC World Cricket League Division Two tournament. In August 2018, he was named in Namibia's squad for the 2018 Africa T20 Cup.

In March 2019, Erasmus was named as the captain of Namibia's squad for the 2019 ICC World Cricket League Division Two tournament. Namibia finished in the top four places in the tournament, therefore gaining One Day International (ODI) status. Erasmus made his ODI debut for Namibia on 27 April 2019, against Oman, in the tournament's final. In May 2019, he was named as the captain of Namibia's squad for the Regional Finals of the 2018–19 ICC T20 World Cup Africa Qualifier tournament in Uganda. He made his Twenty20 International (T20I) debut for Namibia against Ghana on 20 May 2019.

In June 2019, Erasmus was one of twenty-five cricketers to be named in Cricket Namibia's Elite Men's Squad ahead of the 2019–20 international season. In September 2019, he was named as the captain of Namibia's squad for the 2019 ICC T20 World Cup Qualifier tournament in the United Arab Emirates. He was the leading run-scorer for Namibia in the tournament, with 268 runs in nine matches. Following the conclusion of the final, he was named as the player of the tournament.

In September 2021, Erasmus was named as the captain of Namibia's squad for the 2021 ICC Men's T20 World Cup, with the International Cricket Council (ICC) later naming him as the key player in Namibia's team. In a warm-up match against Scotland before the tournament, he broke a finger while fielding. However, he decided to continue playing in the tournament and captain his team in spite of the injury.

In March 2022, in the second match of the 2022 United Arab Emirates Tri-Nation Series, Erasmus scored his first century in ODI cricket, with 121 not out. The following month, in the second match against Uganda, Erasmus also scored his first century in T20I cricket, with an unbeaten 100 against Uganda.

In January 2023, Erasmus won the International Cricket Council's Associate Cricketer of the Year award. Erasmus scored 956 ODI runs at an average of 56.23 and took a dozen wickets in 2022, and scored a century in both ODI and T20I formats.

In May 2024, he was named the captain in Namibia's squad for the 2024 ICC Men's T20 World Cup tournament.

In January 2026, Erasmus was named as the captain of Namibia's squad for the 2026 T20 World Cup.
