= 2021 Oman Tri-Nation Series (round 6) =

Cricket tournament

- Part of 2019–2023 ICC Cricket World Cup League 2
- Date: 13–20 September 2021
- Location: Oman
Teams
| Nepal | Oman | United States |
Captains
| Gyanendra Malla | Zeeshan Maqsood | Saurabh Netravalkar |
Most runs
| Aasif Sheikh (156) | Jatinder Singh (179) | Monank Patel (202) |
Most wickets
| Sandeep Lamichhane (8) Karan KC (8) | Bilal Khan (7) | Saurabh Netravalkar (8) |

The 2021 Oman Tri-Nation Series was the 6th round of the 2019–2023 ICC Cricket World Cup League 2 cricket tournament which was played in Oman in September 2021. It was a tri-nation series between Nepal, Oman and the United States cricket teams, with the matches played as One Day International (ODI) fixtures. The ICC Cricket World Cup League 2 formed part of the qualification pathway to the 2023 Cricket World Cup.

The series was originally scheduled to take place in March 2021. In January 2021, USA Cricket named a 44-man squad to begin training in Texas ahead of the series. The following month, the Cricket Association of Nepal named a 32-man preliminary squad to begin training for the series. However, on 12 February 2021, the series was postponed due to the COVID-19 pandemic. In August 2021, Oman Cricket confirmed that the matches would take place the following month, with the International Cricket Council (ICC) announcing the full schedule shortly after.

Of the six matches that were played, host Oman won three of their fixtures, with Nepal winning two matches and the United States winning one.

== Squads ==
| Nepal | Oman | United States |
|---|---|---|
| Gyanendra Malla (c); ~~Dipendra Singh Airee (vc)~~; Binod Bhandari; Sushan Bhari; Kushal Bhurtel; Abinash Bohara; Gulsan Jha; Sompal Kami; Karan KC; Sandeep Lamichhane; Kushal Malla; Rohit Paudel; Pawan Sarraf; Aarif Sheikh; Aasif Sheikh; Bikram Sob; Sharad Vesawkar | Zeeshan Maqsood (c); Aqib Ilyas (vc); Khawar Ali; Nestor Dhamba; Sandeep Goud; Kaleemullah; Ayaan Khan; Bilal Khan; Shoaib Khan; Naseem Khushi; Suraj Kumar; Pruthvikumar Macchi; Sufyan Mehmood; Mohammad Nadeem; Jatinder Singh | Saurabh Netravalkar (c); ~~Aaron Jones (vc)~~; Karima Gore; Elmore Hutchinson; Nosthush Kenjige; Sanjay Krishnamurthi; Jaskaran Malhotra; Sushant Modani; Abhishek Paradkar; Monank Patel; Nisarg Patel; Kyle Phillip; Dominique Rikhi; Gajanand Singh; ~~Jasdeep Singh~~; Steven Taylor |

The United States named Kyle Phillip as a travelling reserve player for the tour, and later named Sanjay Krishnamurthi as another reserve player. Before the first match, Aaron Jones and Jasdeep Singh were both ruled out of the US squad, with Phillip and Krishnamurthi called up to the main squad. Nepal's Dipendra Singh Airee was also ruled out of the series, after suffering an ankle injury.

== Fixtures ==
=== 1st ODI ===
13 September 2021
14:30 (D/N)
Scorecard

| United States; 230/9 (50 overs) | v | Nepal; 231/5 (49 overs) |
| Monank Patel 100 (114); Sushan Bhari 2/31 (10 overs) | | Kushal Bhurtel 84 (93); Nisarg Patel 2/33 (10 overs) |

Nepal won by 5 wickets
Oman Cricket Academy Ground Turf 1, Muscat
Umpires: Rahul Asher (Oma) and Vinod Babu (Oma)
Player of the match: Kushal Bhurtel (Nep)

- United States won the toss and elected to bat.
- Sanjay Krishnamurthi (USA) made his ODI debut.
- Monank Patel (USA) scored his first century in ODIs.

=== 2nd ODI ===
14 September 2021
14:30 (D/N)
Scorecard

| Nepal; 196 (47.4 overs) | v | Oman; 200/5 (31.1 overs) |
| Aasif Sheikh 90 (112); Bilal Khan 4/47 (10 overs) | | Jatinder Singh 107 (62); Kushal Malla 2/38 (10 overs) |

Oman won by 5 wickets
Oman Cricket Academy Ground Turf 1, Muscat
Umpires: Ahmed Shah Pakteen (Afg) and Harikrishna Pillai (Oma)
Player of the match: Jatinder Singh (Oma)

- Nepal won the toss and elected to bat.
- Nestor Dhamba, Ayaan Khan and Shoaib Khan (Oma) all made their ODI debuts.
- Jatinder Singh (Oma) scored his first century in ODIs.

=== 3rd ODI ===
16 September 2021
14:30 (D/N)
Scorecard

| United States; 178 (44.4 overs) | v | Oman; 179/6 (49.4 overs) |
| Elmore Hutchinson 49* (61); Ayaan Khan 2/29 (9 overs) | | Suraj Kumar 35 (45); Saurabh Netravalkar 3/39 (10 overs) |

Oman won by 4 wickets
Oman Cricket Academy Ground Turf 1, Muscat
Umpires: Vinod Babu (Oma) and Ahmed Shah Pakteen (Afg)
Player of the match: Mohammad Nadeem (Oma)

- Oman won the toss and elected to field.
- Dominique Rikhi (USA) made his ODI debut.

=== 4th ODI ===
17 September 2021
14:30 (D/N)
Scorecard

| Nepal; 174 (48 overs) | v | United States; 175/4 (29.3 overs) |
| Gyanendra Malla 55 (105); Saurabh Netravalkar 4/29 (9 overs) | | Steven Taylor 92 (63); Karan KC 2/23 (5 overs) |

United States won by 6 wickets
Oman Cricket Academy Ground Turf 1, Muscat
Umpires: Rahul Asher (Oma) and Harikrishna Pillai (Oma)
Player of the match: Steven Taylor (USA)

- United States won the toss and elected to field.
- Gulsan Jha (Nep) and Kyle Phillip (USA) both made their ODI debuts.

=== 5th ODI ===
19 September 2021
14:30 (D/N)
Scorecard

| Oman; 121 (37.1 overs) | v | Nepal; 122/3 (18.2 overs) |
| Zeeshan Maqsood 41 (66); Sandeep Lamichhane 4/18 (8.1 overs) | | Gyanendra Malla 52* (46); Nestor Dhamba 2/20 (3 overs) |

Nepal won by 7 wickets
Oman Cricket Academy Ground Turf 1, Muscat
Umpires: Rahul Asher (Oma) and Ahmed Shah Pakteen (Afg)
Player of the match: Karan KC (Nep)

- Nepal won the toss and elected to field.
- Sufyan Mehmood (Oma) made his ODI debut.

=== 6th ODI ===
20 September 2021
14:30 (D/N)
Scorecard

| Oman; 274/7 (50 overs) | v | United States; 202 (39.5 overs) |
| Zeeshan Maqsood 53 (53); Nosthush Kenjige 3/49 (10 overs) | | Monank Patel 56 (58); Ayaan Khan 4/36 (8 overs) |

Oman won by 72 runs
Oman Cricket Academy Ground Turf 1, Muscat
Umpires: Vinod Babu (Oma) and Ahmed Shah Pakteen (Afg)
Player of the match: Ayaan Khan (Oma)

- United States won the toss and elected to field.
- Pruthvikumar Macchi (Oma) made his ODI debut.
