= Timil Patel =

Indian-born American cricketer

Timil Kaushik Patel
Personal information
- Full name: Timil Kaushik Patel
- Born: 1 December 1983 (age 42); Ahmedabad, Gujarat
- Batting: Right-handed
- Bowling: Right-arm legbreak

International information
- National side: United States (2019-2020)
- ODI debut (cap 22): 27 April 2019 v PNG
- Last ODI: 12 February 2020 v Nepal
- T20I debut (cap 8): 15 March 2019 v UAE
- Last T20I: 25 August 2019 v Canada

Domestic team information
- Years: Team
- 2002–2009: Gujarat
- 2015, 2017: ICC Americas
- 2017–present: St Lucia Stars

Career statistics
Competition	ODI	T20I	FC	LA
Matches	7	7	38	38
Runs scored	72	17	1169	451
Batting average	18.00	-	23.85	14.54
100s/50s	0/1	–	1/4	0/1
Top score	50*	14*	104*	50*
Balls bowled	234	132	4,551	1,404
Wickets	6	11	72	37
Bowling average	25.00	13.27	38.88	27.91
5 wickets in innings	0	0	2	0
10 wickets in match	0	0	0	0
Best bowling	2/25	4/27	5/15	3/15
Catches/stumpings	2/–	0/–	25/–	15/–
- Source: Cricinfo, 7 August 2025

Timil Kaushik Patel (born 1 December 1983) is an Indian-born American cricketer. He played with Indian Ranji Trophy team Gujarat from 2002 to 2010. He also played for India Under-19 Team in 2003 that toured England, until he moved to the United States in 2010. Timil also went to Australia in a camp with KKR but was not in the final squad even though he had a fantastic performance. He is right handed-batsman and right arm-leg break bowler.

== Domestic and T20 franchise career ==
Patel played 38 first-class matches, scoring a century and taking two five-wicket hauls for Gujarat cricket team in India's Ranji Trophy competition before leaving to Los Angeles in 2010.

While playing for Gujarat. he was known more for his bowling then the batting. In 38 first-class matches he played took 72 wickets at rate of 38.88. He also scored 1000 runs for Gujarat with one century and 4 half centuries.

In June 2019, he was selected to play for the Brampton Wolves franchise team in the 2019 Global T20 Canada tournament. However, in July 2019, Patel withdrew from the Global T20 Canada tournament, after signing a three-month central contract with USA Cricket. In June 2021, he was selected to take part in the Minor League Cricket tournament in the United States following the players' draft.

== International career ==
In 2010, he shifted to Los Angeles. In USA, he started playing for South West Regional Team and for US Tigers Cricket Club.

In 2012 year's SCCA Division One regular season, he scored 500 runs at 62.50 with five half-centuries which lead his selection in the K.A. Auty Cup. Patel's leg-spin accounted for 47 wickets at 9.77 in 16 matches for Vijayta CC as well. The next best bowler claimed 33 scalps.

He scored 11 off 15 balls in the two-day match, 22 off 39 in the 50-over game, 0 off 2 in the first T20 and 67 not out off 55 balls in the second T20 with the ball took match figures of 7 for 107 in 34 overs during the two-day game, 2 for 49 in 8.5 overs in the 50-over game, 1 for 24 in three overs in the first T20, 1 for 28 in four overs in the second T20.

He had the best all-round performance of any USA player during the week. It is unclear if he will be eligible to play in ICC tournaments next year though because he has only been in the USA since 2010.

In 2013, Timil was announced captain of USA for the K.A. Auty Cup tour to Canada. He replaced young Steven Taylor.

In January 2018, he was named in the United States squad for the 2017–18 Regional Super50 tournament in the West Indies. In August 2018, he was named in the United States' squad for the 2018–19 ICC World Twenty20 Americas Qualifier tournament in Morrisville, North Carolina. In October 2018, he was named in the United States' squads for the 2018–19 Regional Super50 tournament in the West Indies and for the 2018 ICC World Cricket League Division Three tournament in Oman. He was the leading wicket-taker for the United States in the tournament, with eleven dismissals in five matches.

In February 2019, he was named in the United States' Twenty20 International (T20I) squad for their series against the United Arab Emirates. The matches were the first T20I fixtures to be played by the United States cricket team. He made his T20I debut for the United States against the United Arab Emirates on 15 March 2019.

In April 2019, he was named in the United States cricket team's squad for the 2019 ICC World Cricket League Division Two tournament in Namibia. The United States finished in the top four places in the tournament, therefore gaining One Day International (ODI) status. Patel made his ODI debut for the United States on 27 April 2019, against Papua New Guinea, in the tournament's third-place playoff.

In June 2019, he was named in a 30-man training squad for the United States cricket team, ahead of the Regional Finals of the 2018–19 ICC T20 World Cup Americas Qualifier tournament in Bermuda. In August 2019, he was named in the United States' squad for the Regional Finals of the 2018–19 ICC T20 World Cup Americas Qualifier tournament. In November 2019, he was named in the United States' squad for the 2019–20 Regional Super50 tournament.
