= 2019 ICC World Cricket League Division Two =

Cricket tournament

- Dates: 20 – 27 April 2019
- Administrator: International Cricket Council
- Cricket format: One Day International and List A
- Tournament format(s): Round-robin and Knockout
- Host: Namibia
- Champions: Namibia
- Runners-up: Oman
- Participants: 6
- Matches: 18
- Player of the series: (Namibia) JJ Smit
- Most runs: (Hong Kong) Anshuman Rath (290)
- Most wickets: (United States) Ali Khan (17)

The 2019 ICC World Cricket League Division Two was an international cricket tournament that took place in April 2019 in Namibia. It was contested by six teams; Canada, Hong Kong, Oman, Papua New Guinea, the United States and tournament hosts Namibia. It formed part of the 2017–19 cycle of the World Cricket League (WCL) which determined the qualification for the 2023 Cricket World Cup. The final and third-place playoff match were granted One Day International (ODI) status by the International Cricket Council. Namibia won the tournament, defeating Oman by 145 runs in the final. It was Namibia's first win in an ODI match, and the first ever ODI match played by Oman.

== Summary ==
Hong Kong and Papua New Guinea finished in the bottom two places in the 2018 Cricket World Cup Qualifier, therefore relegating them to the Division Two tournament and losing their ODI status in the process. They were joined by Canada and Namibia, who finished third and fourth respectively in the 2018 ICC World Cricket League Division Two tournament, and Oman and the United States, who won promotion from the 2018 ICC World Cricket League Division Three tournament.

Ahead of the tournament in October 2018, it was announced that, following the conclusion of the tournament, the World Cricket League would be replaced by the ICC Cricket World Cup League 2 and the ICC Cricket World Cup Challenge League. The top four teams would join Scotland, Nepal and the United Arab Emirates in League 2 and gain ODI status. The bottom two teams would be assigned to the Challenge League along with other teams from the World Cricket League.

The United States were the first team to qualify for League 2, after they beat Hong Kong by 84 runs in the fourth round of matches. Oman also qualified in the same round of fixtures, after they beat tournament hosts Namibia by four wickets. In the final round of matches, Namibia and Papua New Guinea secured League 2 qualification with big wins. Canada won their final match, against the United States, but finished narrowly behind Papua New Guinea on net run rate and qualified for the Challenge League, along with Hong Kong.

Following the round-robin matches, Canada played Hong Kong in the fifth-place playoff, the United States played Papua New Guinea in the third-place playoff, and hosts Namibia faced Oman in the tournament's final. Claire Polosak was appointed as one of the on-field umpires for the final, becoming the first woman to stand in a men's ODI match.

== Teams ==
Six teams qualified for the tournament:

- Papua New Guinea (9th in the 2018 Cricket World Cup Qualifier)
- Hong Kong (10th in the 2018 Cricket World Cup Qualifier)
- Canada (3rd in 2018 ICC World Cricket League Division Two)
- Namibia (4th in 2018 ICC World Cricket League Division Two)
- Oman (1st in 2018 ICC World Cricket League Division Three)
- United States (2nd in 2018 ICC World Cricket League Division Three)

== Preparation ==
The United States took part in a one-week tour to Antigua, playing five matches, starting on 10 February 2019. USA Cricket also looked at arranging warm-up fixtures against Australia and Pakistan, followed by two Twenty20 International (T20I) matches against the United Arab Emirates, and some 50 over matches in the UAE during March 2019. Oman hosted a Twenty20 International (T20I) quadrangular series followed by three List A games against Scotland in February 2019, before taking part in an eight-team T20 tournament in Kenya during March 2019. Canada played practice matches in Sri Lanka and South Africa before naming their final squad.

Papua New Guinea and Hong Kong were both aiming to regain ODI status after losing it at the conclusion of the 2018 Cricket World Cup Qualifier. Canada were attempting to regain ODI status that they had lost in 2014, and had recruited the experienced Monty Desai to help guide them back to the top tier of Associate cricket. Hosts Namibia had been regulars in the top divisions of the World Cricket League, but their only previous ODIs were back in 2003, and they had faced a lack of international cricket in the months prior to the tournament in relation to their opponents. The United States were competing in Division Two for the first time, and were a team on the rise following a change in administration. Oman's form had fluctuated since qualifying for the 2016 World T20, the low point coming when they were bowled out for just 24 runs in a List A game against Scotland in February 2019.

== Squads ==
Canada Coach: Monty Desai	Hong Kong Coach: Simon Cook	Namibia Coach: Pierre de Bruyn
Davy Jacobs (c); Bhavindu Adhihetty; Navneet Dhaliwal; Nikhil Dutta; Romesh Eranga; Ruvindu Gunasekera; Dillon Heyliger; Nitish Kumar; Hiral Patel; Cecil Pervez; Ravinderpal Singh; Rodrigo Thomas; Srimantha Wijeratne; Saad Bin Zafar	Anshuman Rath (c); Ahsan Abbasi; Tanwir Afzal; Tanveer Ahmed; Jamie Atkinson; Mohammad Ghazanfar; Babar Hayat; Aizaz Khan; Ehsan Khan; Scott McKechnie; Ehsan Nawaz; Kinchit Shah; Jhathavedh Subramanyan; Shahid Wasif	Gerhard Erasmus (c); Jan Frylinck (vc); Stephan Baard; Karl Birkenstock; Jean Bredenkamp; Jan-Izak de Villiers; Zane Green (wk); Zhivago Groenewald; Jean-Pierre Kotze; Tangeni Lungameni; Bernard Scholtz; JJ Smit; Christi Viljoen; Craig Williams; Pikky Ya France
Oman Coach: Duleep Mendis	Papua New Guinea Coach: Joe Dawes	United States Coach: Pubudu Dassanayake
Zeeshan Maqsood (c); Khawar Ali (vc); Fayyaz Butt; Sandeep Goud; Aqib Ilyas; Kaleemullah; Bilal Khan; Suraj Kumar (wk); Sufyan Mehmood; Moonamchery Michal; Mohammad Nadeem; Khurram Nawaz; Jay Odedra; Badal Singh; Jatinder Singh	Assad Vala (c); Charles Amini (vc); Simon Atai; Sese Bau; Kiplin Doriga; Jason Kila; Nosaina Pokana; Damien Ravu; John Reva; Lega Siaka; Chad Soper; Tony Ura; Norman Vanua; Anthony Vare	Saurabh Netravalkar (c); Karima Gore; Elmore Hutchinson; Aaron Jones; Nosthush Kenjige; Ali Khan; Jannisar Khan; Jaskaran Malhotra; Xavier Marshall; Monank Patel; Timil Patel; Roy Silva; Jasdeep Singh; Steven Taylor; Hayden Walsh Jr.

== Points table ==
Pos	Team	Pld	W	L	T	NR	Pts	NRR	
1	Oman	5	4	1	0	0	8	−0.048	Assigned to 2019–23 ICC Cricket World Cup League 2
2	Namibia (H)	5	3	2	0	0	6	1.397	Assigned to 2019–23 ICC Cricket World Cup League 2
3	United States	5	3	2	0	0	6	0.709	Assigned to 2019–23 ICC Cricket World Cup League 2
4	Papua New Guinea	5	2	3	0	0	4	−0.403	Assigned to 2019–23 ICC Cricket World Cup League 2
5	Canada	5	2	3	0	0	4	−0.415	Assigned to 2019–22 ICC Cricket World Cup Challenge League
6	Hong Kong	5	1	4	0	0	2	−1.044	Assigned to 2019–22 ICC Cricket World Cup Challenge League

(H) Host

== Fixtures ==
The following fixtures were confirmed in January 2019.

=== Round-robin ===
20 April 2019
09:30
Scorecard

Papua New Guinea; 118 (42.1 overs)	v	Namibia; 120/7 (30.3 overs)

Namibia won by 3 wickets
Wanderers Cricket Ground, Windhoek

- Namibia won the toss and elected to field.

20 April 2019
09:30
Scorecard

Canada; 222/8 (50 overs)	v	Hong Kong; 223/3 (47.2 overs)

Hong Kong won by 7 wickets
Wanderers Affies Park, Windhoek

- Canada won the toss and elected to bat.
- Ahsan Abbasi and Jhathavedh Subramanyan (HK) both made their List A debuts.
- Kinchit Shah (HK) took a hat-trick.

20 April 2019
09:30
Scorecard

United States; 148 (37.5 overs)	v	Oman; 152/4 (47.5 overs)

Oman won by 6 wickets
United Ground, Windhoek

- Oman won the toss and elected to field.
- Suraj Kumar (Oma) made his List A debut.

21 April 2019
09:30
Scorecard

United States; 250/7 (50 overs)	v	Namibia; 248 (49.4 overs)

United States won by 2 runs
Wanderers Cricket Ground, Windhoek

- Namibia won the toss and elected to field.
- Karima Gore (USA) made his List A debut.
- Aaron Jones (USA) scored his first century in List A cricket.
- Ali Khan (USA) took his first five-wicket haul in List A cricket.

21 April 2019
09:30
Scorecard

Oman; 285/7 (50 overs)	v	Canada; 186 (43.2 overs)

Oman won by 99 runs
Wanderers Affies Park, Windhoek

- Canada won the toss and elected to field.

21 April 2019
09:30
Scorecard

Hong Kong; 222/9 (50 overs)	v	Papua New Guinea; 223/7 (47.4 overs)

Papua New Guinea won by 3 wickets
United Ground, Windhoek

- Papua New Guinea won the toss and elected to field.

23 April 2019
09:30
Scorecard

Hong Kong; 176 (48 overs)	v	Oman; 177/3 (45.3 overs)

Oman won by 7 wickets
Wanderers Cricket Ground, Windhoek

- Oman won the toss and elected to field.

23 April 2019
09:30
Scorecard

Papua New Guinea; 127 (39.3 overs)	v	United States; 128/0 (19.2 overs)

United States won by 10 wickets
Wanderers Affies Park, Windhoek

- Papua New Guinea won the toss and elected to bat.

23 April 2019
09:30
Scorecard

Namibia; 258/6 (50 overs)	v	Canada; 160 (42.1 overs)

Namibia won by 98 runs
United Ground, Windhoek

- Canada won the toss and elected to field.

24 April 2019
09:30
Scorecard

Papua New Guinea; 154 (44.2 overs)	v	Canada; 155/7 (34.2 overs)

Canada won by 3 wickets
Wanderers Cricket Ground, Windhoek

- Papua New Guinea won the toss and elected to bat.
- Ravinderpal Singh (Can) made his List A debut.

24 April 2019
09:30
Scorecard

Namibia; 213/9 (50 overs)	v	Oman; 214/6 (49.1 overs)

Oman won by 4 wickets
Wanderers Affies Park, Windhoek

- Oman won the toss and elected to field.

24 April 2019
09:30
Scorecard

United States; 280/8 (50 overs)	v	Hong Kong; 196/7 (50 overs)

United States won by 84 runs
United Ground, Windhoek

- Hong Kong won the toss and elected to field.
- Mohammad Ghazanfar (HK) made his List A debut.
- Xavier Marshall scored his first century for the United States.
- As a result of this match, USA advances to the 2019-2023 Cricket World Cup League 2

26 April 2019
09:30
Scorecard

Canada; 255/4 (50 overs)	v	United States; 215 (50 overs)

Canada won by 40 runs
Wanderers Cricket Ground, Windhoek

- United States won the toss and elected to field.

26 April 2019
09:30
Scorecard

Namibia; 396/3 (50 overs)	v	Hong Kong; 245 (43.2 overs)

Namibia won by 151 runs
Wanderers Affies Park, Windhoek

- Hong Kong won the toss and elected to field.

26 April 2019
09:30
Scorecard

Papua New Guinea; 221/8 (50 overs)	v	Oman; 76 (28.2 overs)

Papua New Guinea won by 145 runs
United Ground, Windhoek

- Oman won the toss and elected to field.
- Simon Atai (PNG) made his List A debut.
- Nosaina Pokana (PNG) took his first five-wicket haul in List A cricket.

== Playoffs ==
The final and third-place playoff matches were given ODI status by the ICC, with the fifth-place playoff being a List A match. Oman played in their first ever ODI match. The United States played their first ODI match in fifteen years, after playing two matches in the 2004 ICC Champions Trophy in September 2004.

=== Fifth-place playoff ===
27 April 2019
09:30
Scorecard

Hong Kong; 113 (36.1 overs)	v	Canada; 114/5 (16.5 overs)

Canada won by 5 wickets
United Ground, Windhoek

- Hong Kong won the toss and elected to bat.

=== Third-place playoff ===
27 April 2019
09:30
Scorecard

United States; 164 (43.4 overs)	v	Papua New Guinea; 165/5 (33 overs)
Timil Patel 50* (74); Norman Vanua 4/37 (10 overs)		Lega Siaka 62 (51); Timil Patel 2/34 (7 overs)

Papua New Guinea won by 5 wickets
Wanderers Affies Park, Windhoek
Umpires: Huub Jansen (Ned) and Claude Thorburn (Nam)
Player of the match: Norman Vanua (PNG)

- Papua New Guinea won the toss and elected to field.
- Simon Atai (PNG), Karima Gore, Aaron Jones, Ali Khan, Jaskaran Malhotra, Saurabh Netravalkar, Monank Patel, Timil Patel, Jasdeep Singh, Steven Taylor and Hayden Walsh Jr. (USA) all made their ODI debuts.
- Xavier Marshall also made his ODI debut for the United States after previously playing 24 ODIs for the West Indies, becoming the 11th cricketer to represent two international teams in ODIs.

=== Final ===
27 April 2019
09:30
Scorecard

Namibia; 226/7 (50 overs)	v	Oman; 81 (29 overs)
Karl Birkenstock 61 (108); Fayyaz Butt 2/28 (6 overs)		Suraj Kumar 27 (61); Jan Frylinck 5/13 (8 overs)

Namibia won by 145 runs
Wanderers Cricket Ground, Windhoek
Umpires: David Odhiambo (Ken) and Claire Polosak (Aus)
Player of the match: Jan Frylinck (Nam)

- Namibia won the toss and elected to bat.
- Stephan Baard, Karl Birkenstock, Gerhard Erasmus, Jan Frylinck, Zane Green, Jean-Pierre Kotze, Bernard Scholtz, JJ Smit, Christi Viljoen, Craig Williams, Pikky Ya France (Nam), Khawar Ali, Fayyaz Butt, Sandeep Goud, Aqib Ilyas, Kaleemullah, Bilal Khan, Suraj Kumar, Zeeshan Maqsood, Mohammad Nadeem, Khurram Nawaz and Jatinder Singh (Oma) all made their ODI debuts.
- Claire Polosak (Aus) became the first female to umpire in a men's ODI.
- Jan Frylinck became the first bowler for Namibia to take a five-wicket haul on debut in ODIs.

== Final standings ==
Pos.	Team	Status
1st	Namibia	Assigned to 2019–23 ICC Cricket World Cup League 2
2nd	Oman	Assigned to 2019–23 ICC Cricket World Cup League 2
3rd	Papua New Guinea	Assigned to 2019–23 ICC Cricket World Cup League 2
4th	United States	Assigned to 2019–23 ICC Cricket World Cup League 2
5th	Canada	Assigned to 2019–22 ICC Cricket World Cup Challenge League
6th	Hong Kong	Assigned to 2019–22 ICC Cricket World Cup Challenge League
