= Roy Silva =

American cricketer

Personal information
- Full name: Kombu Roy Prasanga Silva
- Born: 9 May 1980 (age 46); Balapitiya, Sri Lanka

International information
- National side: United States
- T20I debut (cap 9): 15 March 2019 v UAE
- Last T20I: 16 March 2019 v UAE

Career statistics
Competition	T20I	FC	LA
Matches	2	87	75
Runs scored	32	3176	721
Batting average	16.00	23.87	11.81
100s/50s	0/0	4/15	0/1
Top score	25	171	50
Balls bowled	12	4003	1621
Wickets	0	86	47
Bowling average	–	29.33	25.93
5 wickets in innings	0	3	0
10 wickets in match	0	0	0
Best bowling	–	7/41	4/40
Catches/stumpings	1/–	85/–	18/–
- Source: Cricinfo, 31 May 2019

Roy Silva (born 9 May 1980) is a Sri Lankan-born American cricketer, who currently plays for the United States cricket team. He made his first-class debut in the 2000–01 season. He made his Twenty20 debut on 17 August 2004, for Moors Sports Club in the 2004 SLC Twenty20 Tournament. Roy was educated at Nalanda College, Colombo.

== Career ==
In March 2017, he was called up to a selection camp with the potential of representing the United States at the 2017 ICC World Cricket League Division Three tournament. In January 2018, he was named in the United States squad for the 2017–18 Regional Super50 tournament in the West Indies. In August 2018, he was named in the United States' squad for the 2018–19 ICC World Twenty20 Americas Qualifier tournament in Morrisville, North Carolina.

In October 2018, he was named in the United States' squads for the 2018–19 Regional Super50 tournament in the West Indies and for the 2018 ICC World Cricket League Division Three tournament in Oman.

In February 2019, he was named in the United States' Twenty20 International (T20I) squad for their series against the United Arab Emirates. The matches were the first T20I fixtures to be played by the United States cricket team. He made his T20I debut for the United States against the United Arab Emirates on 15 March 2019, scoring 25 runs from just seven balls. In April 2019, he was named in the United States cricket team's squad for the 2019 ICC World Cricket League Division Two tournament in Namibia.

In June 2019, he was named in a 30-man training squad for the United States cricket team, ahead of the Regional Finals of the 2018–19 ICC T20 World Cup Americas Qualifier tournament in Bermuda. In June 2021, he was selected to take part in the Minor League Cricket tournament in the United States following the players' draft.
