= Jameel Stuart =

West Indian cricketer (born 1995)

Personal information
- Born: 11 February 1995 (age 31); Barbados
- Source: Cricinfo, 31 January 2018

Jameel Stuart (born 11 February 1995) is a West Indian cricketer. He made his List A debut for Combined Campuses and Colleges in the 2017–18 Regional Super50 on 30 January 2018.
