= Ricardo Adams =

Guyanese cricketer (born 1994)

Personal information
- Born: 23 October 1994 (age 32); Zeelandia, Guyana
- Source: Cricinfo, 13 February 2018

Ricardo Adams (born 23 October 1994) is a Guyanese cricketer. He made his List A debut for Guyana in the 2017–18 Regional Super50 on 12 February 2018.

He was born in Zeelandia, Wakenaam, where he played at Zeelandia Sports Club until he was chosen to lead Essequibo at the U15 level before going on to represent Guyana U15. He played U19 level and scored a century against Trinidad and Tobago in the regional competition. As of 2020, he played for Hyde Park on the East Bank of Essequibo and Police Sports Club in Georgetown.

His brother, Anthony, is also a cricketer at the regional level and the two have played on the same team.
