= Stephan Casey =

Jamaican cricketer (born 1993)

Personal information
- Born: 24 August 1993 (age 33)
- Source: Cricinfo, 19 February 2018

Stephan Casey (born 24 August 1993) is a Jamaican cricketer. He made his List A debut for Jamaica in the 2017–18 Regional Super50 on 18 February 2018.
