= 2017–18 Regional Super50 =

Cricket tournament

- Dates: 30 January – 24 February 2018
- Administrator: WICB
- Cricket format: List A (50 overs)
- Tournament format(s): Group stage, finals
- Host(s): Antigua and Barbuda; Barbados
- Champions: Windward Islands (4th title)
- Participants: 10
- Most runs: Roston Chase (558)
- Most wickets: Shane Shillingford (23)

The 2017–18 Regional Super50 was the 44th edition of the Regional Super50, the domestic limited-overs cricket competition for the countries of the West Indies Cricket Board (WICB). The tournament started on 31 January 2018 and finished on 24 February 2018. Barbados were the defending champions.

In September 2017, two English county teams, Kent and Hampshire, were invited to take part in the competition. Kent took part in the previous edition of the tournament. In January 2018, the United States national cricket team accepted an invite to join the tournament. They were joined by the six regular teams of West Indian domestic cricket (Barbados, Guyana, Jamaica, the Leeward Islands, Trinidad and Tobago, and the Windward Islands) and the Combined Campuses and Colleges team.

Following the conclusion of the group stage, Barbados and the Windward Islands from Group A, and Guyana and Kent from Group B had progressed to the finals. In the first semi-final, Barbados beat Kent by 13 runs in a rain-affected match, after Kraigg Brathwaite scored an unbeaten century. The second semi-final was also rain-affected, with the Windward Islands beating Guyana by 52 runs, with Tyrone Theophile scoring his first century in List A cricket.

The Windward Islands won the tournament, beating the defending champions Barbados by three wickets in the final.

== Squads ==
Barbados	(Cricket West Indies) Combined Campuses	Guyana	Hampshire	Jamaica
Kraigg Brathwaite (c); Sulieman Benn; Carlos Brathwaite; Jonathan Carter; Roston Chase; Justin Greaves; Chemar Holder; Jason Holder; Shai Hope; Ashley Nurse; Omar Phillips; Kemar Roach; Shamar Springer; Kevin Stoute	Kyle Corbin (c); Leniko Boucher; Keron Cottoy; Aaron Daley; Ryan Hinds; Jermaine Levy; Carlos Maynard; Vikash Mohan; Kjorn Ottley; Yannick Ottley; Cameron Pennyfeather; Ojay Shields; Jameel Stuart; Oraine Williams	Leon Johnson (c); Ricardo Adams; Devendra Bishoo; Anthony Bramble; Shivnarine Chanderpaul; Chandrapaul Hemraj; Shimron Hetmyer; Ramaal Lewis; Keemo Paul; Veerasammy Permaul; Clinton Pestano; Raymon Reifer; Sherfane Rutherford; Romario Shepherd	Jimmy Adams (c); Tom Alsop; Gareth Berg; Calvin Dickinson; Fidel Edwards; Sean Ervine; Asher Hart; Lewis McManus; Felix Organ; Chris Sole; Brad Taylor; Joe Weatherley; Brad Wheal; Chris Wood	Nikita Miller (c); Jermaine Blackwood; Chris Gayle; Brandon King; Christopher Lamont; Andre McCarthy; Rovman Powell; Andre Russell; Pete Salmon; Odean Smith; Oshane Thomas; Gavin Wallace; Chadwick Walton; Alwyn Williams
Kent	Leeward Islands	Trinidad and Tobago	United States	Windward Islands
Joe Denly (c); Daniel Bell-Drummond; Alex Blake; Mitchell Claydon; Zak Crawley; Sean Dickson; Will Gidman; Calum Haggett; Matt Hunn; Imran Qayyum; Adam Riley; Ollie Robinson; Adam Rouse; Grant Stewart; Ivan Thomas; James Tredwell	Kieran Powell (c); Rahkeem Cornwall (vc); Justin Athanaze; Sheeno Berridge; Keacy Carty; Kevon Cooper; Jahmar Hamilton; Montcin Hodge; Akeal Hosein; Jeremiah Louis; Mervin Matthew; Marlon Samuels; Devon Thomas; Terrence Warde	Denesh Ramdin (c); Sheldon Cottrell; Shannon Gabriel; Amir Jangoo; Imran Khan; Evin Lewis; Jason Mohammed; Sunil Narine; Ewart Nicholson; Khary Pierre; Nicholas Pooran; Roshon Primus; Isaiah Rajah; Tion Webster	Ibrahim Khaleel (c, wk); Adil Bhatti; Elmore Hutchinson; Nosthush Kenjige; Jaskaran Malhotra (wk); Xavier Marshall; Prashanth Nair; Saurabh Netravalkar; Mrunal Patel; Nisarg Patel; Timil Patel; Usman Rafiq; Roy Silva; Sunny Sohal	Shane Shillingford (c); Roland Cato; Johnson Charles; Kirk Edwards; Larry Edwards; Andre Fletcher; Kavem Hodge; Ryan John; Delorn Johnson; Kyle Mayers; Obed McCoy; Devon Smith; Tyrone Theophile; Josh Thomas; Kesrick Williams

== Points tables ==
In the group stage of the tournament four points were awarded for each match a team won, with two points awarded to both teams if a match ends in a tie or if there is no result declared. A bonus point was awarded to a team if they won a match with a run rate of 1.25 greater than that of the opposition team.

=== Group A ===
Pos	Team	Pld	W	L	T	NR	BP	Pts	NRR
1	Barbados	8	6	2	0	0	3	27	1.293
2	Windward Islands	8	5	3	0	0	2	22	−0.062
3	Trinidad and Tobago	8	4	3	0	1	4	22	0.423
4	Combined Campuses and Colleges	8	2	5	0	1	2	12	−0.837
5	Hampshire	8	2	6	0	0	1	9	−0.777

Source: CricInfo

=== Group B ===
Pos	Team	Pld	W	L	T	NR	BP	Pts	NRR
1	Guyana	8	6	2	0	0	2	26	0.425
2	Kent	8	6	2	0	0	1	25	0.402
3	Jamaica	8	5	3	0	0	4	24	0.846
4	Leeward Islands	8	2	6	0	0	1	9	−0.270
5	United States	8	1	7	0	0	1	5	−1.303

Source: CricInfo

The top two teams from each group qualified for the playoff stage of the tournament.

== Fixtures ==
=== Group A ===
30 January 2018
Scorecard

Combined Campuses and Colleges; 228 (48.2 overs)	v	Windward Islands; 113 (29.3 overs)
Kjorn Ottley 60 (89); Kesrick Williams 4/70 (9.2 overs)		Delorn Johnson 28 (32); Ryan Hinds 3/22 (8 overs)

Combined Campuses and Colleges won by 115 runs
Three Ws Oval, Barbados
Umpires: Jonathan Blades and Carl Tuckett
Player of the match: Ryan Hinds (Combined Campuses and Colleges)

- Windward Islands won the toss and elected to field.
- Jameel Stuart, Carlos Maynard and Aaron Daley (Combined Campuses and Colleges) all made their List A debuts.

30 January 2018
Scorecard

Barbados; 278/9 (50 overs)	v	Trinidad and Tobago; 107 (21.3 overs)
Kevin Stoute 74 (107); Sheldon Cottrell 3/52 (10 overs)		Sunil Narine 51 (28); Miguel Cummins 4/35 (9 overs)

Barbados won by 171 runs
Kensington Oval, Bridgetown
Umpires: Shannon Crawford and Christopher Taylor
Player of the match: Miguel Cummins (Barbados)

- Trinidad and Tobago won the toss and elected to field.
- Tion Webster (Trinidad and Tobago) made his List A debut.

1 February 2018
Scorecard

Hampshire; 227/7 (50 overs)	v	Barbados; 231/3 (46.2 overs)
Sean Ervine 63 (68); Miguel Cummins 3/27 (8 overs)		Jonathan Carter 92* (113); Brad Wheal 1/29 (6 overs)

Barbados won by 7 wickets
Kensington Oval, Bridgetown
Umpires: Shannon Crawford and Christopher Taylor
Player of the match: Jonathan Carter (Barbados)

- Barbados won the toss and elected to field.
- Calvin Dickinson (Hampshire) made his List A debut.

1 February 2018
Scorecard

Combined Campuses and Colleges; 101 (25.4 overs)	v	Trinidad and Tobago; 102/1 (11.2 overs)
Ryan Hinds 32 (19); Sunil Narine 5/10 (7.4 overs)		Evin Lewis 70* (41); Aaron Daley 1/35 (3 overs)

Trinidad and Tobago won by 9 wickets
Three Ws Oval, Barbados
Umpires: Jonathan Blades and Patrick Gustard

- Combined Campuses and Colleges won the toss and elected to bat.
- Oraine Williams and Ojay Shields (Combined Campuses and Colleges) both made their List A debuts.

3 February 2018
Scorecard

Trinidad and Tobago; 282/8 (50 overs)	v	Hampshire; 207 (46 overs)
Jason Mohammed 61 (82); Brad Wheal 3/48 (10 overs)		Jimmy Adams 49 (55); Sunil Narine 3/24 (10 overs)

Trinidad and Tobago won by 75 runs
Windward Park, Barbados
Umpires: Christopher Taylor and Carl Tuckett
Player of the match: Sunil Narine (Trinidad and Tobago)

- Hampshire won the toss and elected to field.
- Asher Hart (Hampshire) made his List A debut.

3 February 2018
Scorecard

Barbados; 211/9 (50 overs)	v	Windward Islands; 111 (32.3 overs)
Shai Hope 53 (89); Delorn Johnson 3/36 (10 overs)		Kavem Hodge 36* (69); Miguel Cummins 4/27 (10 overs)

Barbados won by 100 runs
Kensington Oval, Bridgetown
Umpires: Shannon Crawford and Patrick Gustard
Player of the match: Shai Hope (Barbados)

- Barbados won the toss and elected to bat.

5 February 2018
Scorecard

Hampshire; 152 (42.3 overs)	v	Combined Campuses and Colleges; 148 (46 overs)
Brad Taylor 69 (108); Yannick Ottley 3/33 (9.3 overs)		Vikash Mohan 40 (78); Brad Wheal 3/29 (10 overs)

Hampshire won by 4 runs
Kensington Oval, Bridgetown
Umpires: Shannon Crawford and Christopher Taylor

- Hampshire won the toss and elected to bat.

5 February 2018
Scorecard

Windward Islands; 222 (48.3 overs)	v	Trinidad and Tobago; 226/6 (39.2 overs)
Devon Smith 68 (113); Sunil Narine 4/25 (10 overs)		Evin Lewis 100 (90); Larry Edwards 4/38 (8 overs)

Trinidad and Tobago won by 4 wickets
Three Ws Oval, Barbados
Umpires: Jonathan Blades and Patrick Gustard
Player of the match: Evin Lewis (Trinidad and Tobago)

- Trinidad and Tobago won the toss and elected to field.

7 February 2018
Scorecard

Hampshire; 200 (48.2 overs)	v	Windward Islands; 204/4 (36.2 overs)
Jimmy Adams 83 (75); Shane Shillingford 4/32 (10 overs)		Kirk Edwards 71* (91); Fidel Edwards 3/52 (7 overs)

Windward Islands won by 6 wickets
Kensington Oval, Bridgetown
Umpires: Jonathan Blades and Shannon Crawford

- Hampshire won the toss and elected to bat.
- Felix Organ (Hampshire) made his List A debut.

7 February 2018
Scorecard

Barbados; 254/6 (50 overs)	v	Combined Campuses and Colleges; 71 (32.2 overs)
Shai Hope 102 (135); Ryan Hinds 2/22 (10 overs)		Ryan Hinds 32 (58); Chemar Holder 3/31 (7 overs)

Barbados won by 183 runs
Windward Park, Barbados
Umpires: Christopher Taylor and Carl Tuckett
Player of the match: Shai Hope (Barbados)

- Combined Campuses and Colleges won the toss and elected to field.

9 February 2018
Scorecard

Hampshire; 139 (39 overs)	v	Trinidad and Tobago; 143/9 (37.3 overs)
Jimmy Adams 39 (58); Khary Pierre 6/34 (10 overs)		Jason Mohammed 51 (101); Joe Weatherley 4/25 (8 overs)

Trinidad and Tobago won by 1 wicket
Three Ws Oval, Barbados
Umpires: Jonathan Blades and Christopher Taylor

9 February 2018
Scorecard

Windward Islands; 201 (49.1 overs)	v	Barbados; 179 (46.4 overs)
Johnson Charles 40 (54); Dominic Drakes 2/12 (6 overs)		Jason Holder 49 (56); Kyle Mayers 4/31 (8.4 overs)

Windward Islands won by 22 runs
Kensington Oval, Bridgetown
Umpires: Shannon Crawford and Patrick Gustard

- Dominic Drakes (Barbados) made his List A debut.

11 February 2018
Scorecard

Combined Campuses and Colleges; 172 (50 overs)	v	Windward Islands; 177/9 (50 overs)
Vikash Mohan 36 (62); Kavem Hodge 3/16 (10 overs)		Devon Smith 40 (65); Yannick Ottley 3/21 (10 overs)

Windward Islands won by 1 wicket
Three Ws Oval, Barbados
Umpires: Shannon Crawford and Christopher Taylor

- Windward Islands won the toss and elected to field.
- Ryan John (Windward Islands) made his List A debut.

11 February 2018
Scorecard

Barbados; 235/7 (50 overs)	v	Trinidad and Tobago; 203 (48.4 overs)
Roston Chase 46 (41); Shannon Gabriel 2/43 (9 overs)		Isaiah Rajah 39 (76); Jason Holder 4/38 (10 overs)

Barbados won by 32 runs
Kensington Oval, Bridgetown
Umpires: Patrick Gustard and Carl Tuckett

- Barbados won the toss and elected to bat.
- Isaiah Rajah (Trinidad and Tobago) made his List A debut.

13 February 2018
Scorecard

Barbados; 253/6 (49.1 overs)	v	Hampshire; 107/5 (20.3 overs)
Roston Chase 105 (120); Fidel Edwards 4/35 (9.1 overs)		Joe Weatherley 54* (70); Ashley Nurse 3/37 (6.3 overs)

Barbados won by 17 runs (D/L method)
Windward Park, Barbados
Umpires: Nigel Duguid and Carl Tuckett
Player of the match: Roston Chase (Barbados)

- Hampshire won the toss and elected to field.
- Tevyn Walcott (Barbados) made his List A debut.

13 February 2018
Scorecard

Combined Campuses and Colleges	v	Trinidad and Tobago

Match abandoned
Kensington Oval, Bridgetown
Umpires: Jonathan Blades and Patrick Gustard

- No toss.

15 February 2018
Scorecard

Combined Campuses and Colleges; 124 (33.3 overs)	v	Hampshire; 125/1 (28 overs)
Kjorn Ottley 50 (57); Brad Taylor 4/26 (10 overs)		Jimmy Adams 66* (68); Jermaine Levy 1/22 (5 overs)

Hampshire won by 9 wickets
Windward Park, Barbados
Umpires: Christopher Taylor and Nigel Duguid

- Combined Campuses and Colleges won the toss and elected to bat.

15 February 2018
Scorecard

Trinidad and Tobago; 254/8 (50 overs)	v	Windward Islands; 255/7 (46.3 overs)
Tion Webster 58 (77); Shane Shillingford 3/54 (10 overs)		Kyle Mayers 53 (48); Sunil Narine 4/42 (10 overs)

Windward Islands won by 3 wickets
Kensington Oval, Bridgetown
Umpires: Patrick Gustard and Carl Tuckett

- Windward Islands won the toss and elected to field.
- Ewart Nicholson (Trinidad and Tobago) made his List A debut.

17 February 2018
Scorecard

Windward Islands; 293 (48.4 overs)	v	Hampshire; 157 (37.4 overs)
Andre Fletcher 132 (135); Chris Wood 5/38 (9.4 overs)		Lewis McManus 35 (48); Kavem Hodge 4/24 (8.4 overs)

Windward Islands won by 136 runs
Three Ws Oval, Barbados
Umpires: Jonathan Blades and Nigel Duguid

- Hampshire won the toss and elected to field.

17 February 2018
Scorecard

Barbados; 196/9 (50 overs)	v	Combined Campuses and Colleges; 197/4 (43.3 overs)
Roston Chase 48 (68); Jermaine Levy 3/28 (10 overs)		Kyle Corbin 66 (80); Joshua Bishop 2/35 (7 overs)

Combined Campuses and Colleges won by 6 wickets
Kensington Oval, Bridgetown
Umpires: Patrick Gustard and Carl Tuckett

- Barbados won the toss and elected to bat.

=== Group B ===
31 January 2018
Scorecard

Guyana; 233 (49 overs)	v	Kent; 198 (46.3 overs)
Shivnarine Chanderpaul 67 (97); Mitchell Claydon 5/31 (10 overs)		Zak Crawley 60 (73); Veerasammy Permaul 4/46 (10 overs)

Guyana won by 35 runs
Sir Vivian Richards Stadium, Antigua
Umpires: Zahid Bassarath and Danesh Ramdhanie

- Guyana won the toss and elected to bat.
- Chandrapaul Hemraj and Sherfane Rutherford (Guyana) both made their List A debuts.

31 January 2018
Scorecard

Leeward Islands; 298/8 (50 overs)	v	United States; 136 (38.5 overs)
Rahkeem Cornwall 132* (92); Elmore Hutchinson 3/44 (10 overs)		Jaskaran Malhotra 43 (72); Akeal Hosein 5/26 (8.5 overs)

Leeward Islands won by 162 runs
Coolidge Cricket Ground, Antigua
Umpires: Deighton Butler and Leslie Reifer

- Leeward Islands won the toss and elected to bat.
- Sheeno Berridge (Leeward Islands), Jaskaran Malhotra, Nisarg Patel, Mrunal Patel, Adil Bhatti, Elmore Hutchinson and Nosthush Kenjige (United States) all made their List A debuts.

2 February 2018
Scorecard

Leeward Islands; 287/5 (50 overs)	v	Jamaica; 264/9 (50 overs)
Marlon Samuels 106* (92); Chris Gayle 2/41 (9 overs)		Andre Russell 76 (72); Justin Athanaze 3/28 (10 overs)

Leeward Islands won by 23 runs
Coolidge Cricket Ground, Antigua
Umpires: Zahid Bassarath and Deighton Butler

- Leeward Islands won the toss and elected to bat.
- Terrence Warde (Leeward Islands), Pete Salmon, Oshane Thomas and Christopher Lamont (Jamaica) all made their List A debuts.

2 February 2018
Scorecard

United States; 188/8 (50 overs)	v	Guyana; 191/2 (32.2 overs)
Elmore Hutchinson 43* (87); Veerasammy Permaul 2/29 (10 overs)		Shimron Hetmyer 103 (69); Elmore Hutchinson 1/14 (6 overs)

Guyana won by 8 wickets
Sir Vivian Richards Stadium, Antigua
Umpires: Leslie Reifer and Jacqueline Williams

- United States of America won the toss and elected to bat.
- Clinton Pestano (Guyana) and Usman Rafiq (United States) both made their List A debuts.

4 February 2018
Scorecard

Jamaica; 156 (41.3 overs)	v	Kent; 159/6 (43.3 overs)
Andre McCarthy 76 (85); Ivan Thomas 4/30 (9.3 overs)		Alex Blake 74* (105); Andre Russell 2/30 (8 overs)

Kent won by 4 wickets
Sir Vivian Richards Stadium, Antigua
Umpires: Zahid Bassarath and Danesh Ramdhanie
Player of the match: Joe Denly (Kent)

- Jamaica won the toss and elected to bat.

4 February 2018
Scorecard

Guyana; 298/8 (50 overs)	v	Leeward Islands; 282 (45.5 overs)
Leon Johnson 99 (93); Rahkeem Cornwall 1/23 (10 overs)		Rahkeem Cornwall 119 (96); Keemo Paul 5/76 (10 overs)

Guyana won by 16 runs
Coolidge Cricket Ground, Antigua
Umpires: Deighton Butler and Jacqueline Williams
Player of the match: Keemo Paul (Guyana)

- Guyana won the toss and elected to bat.

6 February 2018
Scorecard

Leeward Islands; 183 (49.1 overs)	v	Kent; 187/1 (44.3 overs)
Terrence Warde 71 (91); Will Gidman 3/31 (9 overs)		Zak Crawley 99* (140)

Kent won by 9 wickets
Sir Vivian Richards Stadium, Antigua
Umpires: Zahid Bassarath and Jacqueline Williams

- Kent won the toss and elected to field.

6 February 2018
Scorecard

Jamaica; 254/8 (50 overs)	v	United States; 156 (49.1 overs)
Nikita Miller 52* (41); Elmore Hutchinson 3/40 (10 overs)		Sunny Sohal 65 (111); Christopher Lamont 2/20 (10 overs)

Jamaica won by 98 runs
Coolidge Cricket Ground, Antigua
Umpires: Danesh Ramdhanie and Leslie Reifer

- Jamaica won the toss and elected to bat.
- Fabian Allen (Jamaica) made his List A debut.

8 February 2018
Scorecard

Kent; 215/9 (50 overs)	v	United States; 186/9 (50 overs)
Joe Denly 96 (109); Roy Silva 3/42 (7 overs)		Ibrahim Khaleel 61 (114); Adam Riley 3/36 (9 overs)

Kent won by 29 runs
Sir Vivian Richards Stadium, Antigua
Umpires: Deighton Butler and Leslie Reifer

- United States of America won the toss and elected to field.

8 February 2018
Scorecard

Jamaica; 264/9 (50 overs)	v	Guyana; 168 (30.2 overs)
Andre McCarthy 105 (104); Keemo Paul 3/46 (8 overs)		Shimron Hetmyer 40 (43); Nikita Miller 4/22 (7 overs)

Jamaica won by 46 runs (D/L method)
Coolidge Cricket Ground, Antigua
Umpires: Zahid Bassarath and Danesh Ramdhanie

10 February 2018
Scorecard

Guyana; 158 (47.1 overs)	v	Kent; 162/7 (37 overs)
Christopher Barnwell 36 (66); Will Gidman 4/20 (10 overs)		Will Gidman 29* (48); Devendra Bishoo 4/35 (10 overs)

Kent won by 3 wickets
Coolidge Cricket Ground, Antigua
Umpires: Zahid Bassarath and Lyndon Rajkumar

- Guyana won the toss and elected to bat.
- Grant Stewart (Kent) made his List A debut.

10 February 2018
Scorecard

United States; 193 (50 overs)	v	Leeward Islands; 134 (40.5 overs)
Sunny Sohal 50 (90); Terrence Warde 3/34 (9 overs)		Justin Athanaze 47* (51); Nosthush Kenjige 4/38 (8 overs)

United States of America won by 59 runs
Sir Vivian Richards Stadium, Antigua
Umpires: Deighton Butler and Leslie Reifer

- Leeward Islands won the toss and elected to field.

12 February 2018
Scorecard

Jamaica; 329/7 (50 overs)	v	Leeward Islands; 181 (41.1 overs)
Chadwick Walton 169 (129); Terrence Warde 2/60 (10 overs)		Terrence Warde 43 (47); Andre McCarthy 5/26 (7.1 overs)

Jamaica won by 148 runs
Coolidge Cricket Ground, Antigua
Umpires: Deighton Butler and Leslie Reifer

- Jamaica won the toss and elected to bat.
- Kofi James (Leeward Islands) made his List A debut.

12 February 2018
Scorecard

United States; 144 (43.1 overs)	v	Guyana; 150/3 (30.1 overs)
Jaskaran Malhotra 80 (116); Christopher Barnwell 4/35 (9 overs)		Chandrapaul Hemraj 64 (59); Timil Patel 1/27 (3.1 overs)

Guyana won by 7 wickets
Sir Vivian Richards Stadium, Antigua
Umpires: Zahid Bassarath and Danesh Ramdhanie

- Guyana won the toss and elected to field.
- Ricardo Adams (Guyana) made his List A debut.

14 February 2018
Scorecard

Kent; 239/5 (50 overs)	v	Jamaica; 240/7 (49.1 overs)
Daniel Bell-Drummond 105* (146); Fabian Allen 2/35 (10 overs)		Andre Russell 108* (111); Joe Denly 3/53 (10 overs)

Jamaica won by 3 wickets
Sir Vivian Richards Stadium, Antigua
Umpires: Leslie Reifer and Jacqueline Williams

- Jamaica won the toss and elected to field.

14 February 2018
Scorecard

Leeward Islands; 216/8 (50 overs)	v	Guyana; 217/5 (47.1 overs)
Devon Thomas 103* (117); Devendra Bishoo 3/35 (10 overs)		Christopher Barnwell 89 (94); Terrence Warde 4/37 (9.1 overs)

Guyana won by 5 wickets
Coolidge Cricket Ground, Antigua
Umpires: Deighton Butler and Lyndon Rajkumar

- Guyana won the toss and elected to field.
- Akeem Charles (Leeward Islands) made his List A debut.

16 February 2018
Scorecard

Kent; 172/9 (50 overs)	v	United States; 142 (42 overs)
Grant Stewart 44 (86); Roy Silva 2/31 (8 overs)		Roy Silva 50 (57); Imran Qayyum 4/33 (10 overs)

Kent won by 30 runs
Sir Vivian Richards Stadium, Antigua
Umpires: Lyndon Rajkumar and Zahid Bassarath
Player of the match: Roy Silva (United States)

- Kent won the toss and elected to bat.

16 February 2018
Scorecard

Jamaica; 264/8 (50 overs)	v	Guyana; 213/6 (38.4 overs)
Chadwick Walton 104 (111); Chandrapaul Hemraj 2/22 (3 overs)		Chandrapaul Hemraj 80 (65); Pete Salmon 4/28 (8 overs)

Guyana won by 4 wickets (D/L method)
Coolidge Cricket Ground, Antigua
Umpires: Danesh Ramdhanie and Deighton Butler

- Jamaica won the toss and elected to bat.

18 February 2018
Scorecard

Kent; 266/9 (50 overs)	v	Leeward Islands; 196/6 (42 overs)
Sean Dickson 72 (62); Orlando Peters 5/49 (10 overs)		Keacy Carty 69 (87); Adam Riley 4/40 (10 overs)

Kent won by 23 runs (D/L method)
Coolidge Cricket Ground, Antigua
Umpires: Leslie Reifer and Jacqueline Williams

- Kent won the toss and elected to bat.

18 February 2018
Scorecard

Jamaica; 259/8 (50 overs)	v	United States; 179/9 (50 overs)
Trevon Griffith 80 (102); Saurabh Netravalkar 4/45 (10 overs)		Jaskaran Malhotra 70 (106); Christopher Lamont 2/17 (10 overs)

Jamaica won by 80 runs
Sir Vivian Richards Stadium, Antigua
Umpires: Zahid Bassarath and Danesh Ramdhanie

- Jamaica won the toss and elected to bat.
- Stephan Casey (Jamaica) and Prashanth Nair (United States) both made their List A debuts.

== Finals ==
1st Semi-final
21 February 2018
Scorecard

Barbados; 263/3 (50 overs)	v	Kent; 216/8 (43 overs)
Kraigg Brathwaite 105* (135); Adam Riley 1/34 (10 overs)		Sean Dickson 51 (73); Hayden Walsh 2/45 (8 overs)

Barbados won by 13 runs (D/L method)
Coolidge Cricket Ground, Antigua
Umpires: Nigel Duguid and Deighton Butler
Player of the match: Kraigg Brathwaite (Barbados)

- Barbados won the toss and elected to bat.

2nd Semi-final
22 February 2018
Scorecard

Windward Islands; 286/7 (50 overs)	v	Guyana; 231 (44.2 overs)
Tyrone Theophile 107 (104); Ramaal Lewis 3/54 (9 overs)		Sherfane Rutherford 49 (53); Kavem Hodge 3/49 (10 overs)

Windward Islands won by 52 runs (D/L method)
Coolidge Cricket Ground, Antigua
Umpires: Patrick Gustard and Leslie Reifer
Player of the match: Kavem Hodge (Windward Islands)

- Guyana won the toss and elected to field.
- Tyrone Theophile (Windward Islands) scored his first century in List A cricket.

Final
24 February 2018
Scorecard

Barbados; 232/9 (50 overs)	v	Windward Islands; 236/7 (49.3 overs)
Jonathan Carter 80 (108); Obed McCoy 2/29 (5 overs)		Roland Cato 54 (64); Dominic Drakes 3/38 (10 overs)

Windward Islands won by 3 wickets
Coolidge Cricket Ground, Antigua
Umpires: Nigel Duguid and Patrick Gustard
Player of the match: Roland Cato (Windward Islands)

- Barbados won the toss and elected to bat.
