= Prashanth Nair =

American cricketer (born 1993)

Personal information
- Born: May 7, 1993 (age 33); Ernakulam, Kerala, India
- Batting: Right-handed
- Bowling: Right arm offbreak, Slow left arm Orthodox
- Role: Bowler

International information
- National side: United States
- Source: Cricinfo, February 19, 2018

Prashanth Nair (born May 7, 1993) is an Indian-born American cricketer. He made his List A debut for the United States in the 2017–18 Regional Super50 on February 18, 2018.

His unique ambidextrous skillset helped him gain selection at age 23 for his first USA senior team tournament in October 2016 at ICC WCL Division Four in LA.
