= United States cricket team in the United Arab Emirates in 2018–19 =

Cricket tour

United States cricket team in the UAE in 2018–19
	United Arab Emirates	United States
- Dates: 15 – 28 March 2019
Captains	Mohammad Naveed	Saurabh Netravalkar

Twenty20 International series
- Results: United Arab Emirates won the 2-match series 1–0
Most runs	Shaiman Anwar (80)	Steven Taylor (121)
Most wickets	Zahoor Khan (4); Sultan Ahmed (4)	Jasdeep Singh (3)

The United States cricket team toured the United Arab Emirates in March 2019 to play two Twenty20 International (T20I) matches ahead of the 2019 ICC World Cricket League Division Two tournament. They were the first T20I fixtures to be played by the United States, and their first full international matches since the 2004 ICC Champions Trophy.

The United States named their team on 28 February 2019, with Saurabh Netravalkar, who had previously played for Mumbai in the Ranji Trophy in India, captaining the side. Xavier Marshall was also named in the United States' squad, having previously played 37 international matches for the West Indies cricket team.

The United Arab Emirates retained Mohammad Naveed as the captain of the team, after their regular captain, Rohan Mustafa, had previously been suspended. Mustafa returned to the squad, along with Ahmed Raza and Rameez Shahzad, who had also previously been suspended.

The United Arab Emirates won the T20I series 1–0, after the first game finished as a no result due to rain.

Following the T20I matches, the United States played seven 50-over matches against the UAE, a UAE XI team and Lancashire County Cricket Club. The latter match was the first fixture between the two teams. It was also the first time an American cricket team had played Lancashire since the Philadelphian cricket team toured England in 1903, when they played at Old Trafford. The United States won six of the seven 50-over matches, which included two wins against the full UAE national team.

== Squads ==
T20Is
United Arab Emirates	United States
Mohammad Naveed (c); Ashfaq Ahmed; Sultan Ahmed; Waheed Ahmed; Shaiman Anwar; Mohammad Boota; Imran Haider; Amir Hayat; Amjad Khan; Zahoor Khan; Rohan Mustafa; Ahmed Raza; Chundangapoyil Rizwan; Rameez Shahzad; Abdul Shakoor	Saurabh Netravalkar (c); Elmore Hutchinson; Aaron Jones; Nosthush Kenjige; Ali Khan; Jannisar Khan; Jaskaran Malhotra; Xavier Marshall; Monank Patel; Timil Patel; Roy Silva; Jasdeep Singh; Steven Taylor; Hayden Walsh Jr.

== T20I series ==
=== 1st T20I ===
15 March 2019
14:00
Scorecard

United States; 152/7 (15 overs)	v	United Arab Emirates; 29/2 (3.3 overs)
Steven Taylor 72 (39); Zahoor Khan 2/30 (3 overs)		Shaiman Anwar 18* (11); Jasdeep Singh 2/18 (2 overs)

No result
ICC Academy Ground, Dubai
Umpires: Akbar Ali (UAE) and Iftikhar Ali (UAE)

- United Arab Emirates won the toss and elected to field.
- Rain during the United Arab Emirates' innings prevented any further play.
- Elmore Hutchinson, Aaron Jones, Jaskaran Malhotra, Saurabh Netravalkar, Monank Patel, Timil Patel, Roy Silva, Jasdeep Singh, Steven Taylor and Hayden Walsh Jr. (USA) all made their T20I debuts.
- Xavier Marshall also made his T20I debut for the United States after previously playing six T20Is for the West Indies, becoming the seventh cricketer to represent two international teams in T20Is.

=== 2nd T20I ===
16 March 2019
14:00
Scorecard

United Arab Emirates; 182/7 (20 overs)	v	United States; 158/6 (20 overs)
Shaiman Anwar 62 (30); Hayden Walsh Jr. 2/21 (3 overs)		Steven Taylor 49 (40); Sultan Ahmed 3/33 (4 overs)

United Arab Emirates won by 24 runs
ICC Academy Ground, Dubai
Umpires: Akbar Ali (UAE) and Shiju Sam (UAE)
Player of the match: Shaiman Anwar (UAE)

- United Arab Emirates won the toss and elected to bat.

== 50-over series ==
=== 1st match ===
18 March 2019
10:00
Scorecard

United Arab Emirates; 209 (48.1 overs)	v	United States; 210/5 (47.3 overs)
Rameez Shahzad 53 (62); Steven Taylor 4/38 (10 overs)		Aaron Jones 81* (107); Mohammad Naveed 1/30 (8.3 overs)

United States won by 5 wickets
ICC Academy Ground, Dubai
Umpires: Shameem Abdul Basheer (UAE) and Aasif Iqbal (UAE)

- United Arab Emirates won the toss and elected to bat.

=== 2nd match ===
19 March 2019
10:00
Scorecard

Lancashire; 221 (49.5 overs)	v	United States; 222/4 (47 overs)
Tom Hartley 75* (87); Nosthush Kenjige 5/27 (10 overs)		Aaron Jones 84* (138); Liam Hurt 2/16 (4.5 overs)

United States won by 6 wickets
ICC Academy Ground, Dubai
Umpires: Shameem Abdul Basheer (UAE) and Vipin Singh (UAE)

- United States won the toss and elected to field.

=== 3rd match ===
21 March 2019
10:00
Scorecard

United States; 265/7 (50 overs)	v	United Arab Emirates XI; 231/9 (50 overs)
Jaskaran Malhotra 90 (100); Rahul Bhatia 2/39 (10 overs)		Chirag Suri 51 (67); Roy Silva 3/50 (10 overs)

United States won by 34 runs
The Sevens Stadium, Dubai
Umpires: Mirza Sharique Baig (UAE) and Shameem Abdul Basheer (UAE)

- United Arab Emirates XI won the toss and elected to field.

=== 4th match ===
22 March 2019
10:00
Scorecard

United States; 302 (48.3 overs)	v	United Arab Emirates XI; 270 (46.4 overs)
Xavier Marshall 170 (147); Saif Noor 6/42 (9.3 overs)		Amjad Khan 128 (94); Steven Taylor 2/43 (9 overs)

United States won by 32 runs
The Sevens Stadium, Dubai
Umpires: Khalid Elahi (UAE) and Vipin Singh (UAE)

- United Arab Emirates XI won the toss and elected to field.

=== 5th match ===
24 March 2019
10:00
Scorecard

United States; 257/7 (50 overs)	v	United Arab Emirates XI; 196/9 (46.2 overs)
Steven Taylor 95 (98); Saif Noor 3/36 (8 overs)		Sultan Ahmed 67 (62); Ali Khan 4/26 (8 overs)

United States won by 61 runs
The Sevens Stadium, Dubai

- United States won the toss and elected to bat.

=== 6th match ===
25 March 2019
10:00
Scorecard

United Arab Emirates; 279/5 (50 overs)	v	United States; 257/9 (50 overs)
Ghulam Shabber 136 (133); Steven Taylor 2/50 (10 overs)		Xavier Marshall 76 (98); Tahir Latif 3/44 (10 overs)

United Arab Emirates won by 22 runs
The Sevens Stadium, Dubai

- United Arab Emirates won the toss and elected to bat.

=== 7th match ===
28 March 2019
10:00
Scorecard

United Arab Emirates; 143 (38 overs)	v	United States; 144/1 (31 overs)
Muhammad Usman 45 (74); Steven Taylor 5/26 (9 overs)		Steven Taylor 68* (71); Ahmed Raza 1/34 (9 overs)

United States won by 9 wickets
The Sevens Stadium, Dubai

- United States won the toss and elected to field.
- The match was reduced to 42 overs per side due to rain.
