= Kyle Phillip =

Trinidadian-American cricketer (born 1997)

Personal information
- Born: 26 January 1997 (age 29); Trinidad and Tobago
- Batting: Right-handed
- Bowling: Right-arm medium
- Role: Bowler

International information
- National side: United States
- ODI debut (cap 37): 17 September 2021 v Nepal
- Last ODI: 17 September 2022 v Namibia
- Source: Cricinfo, 17 September 2022

Kyle Phillip (born 26 January 1997) is a Trinidadian-American cricketer who plays for the United States cricket team. He made his List A debut for the United States in the 2018–19 Regional Super50 tournament on 10 October 2018. In June 2019, he was named in a 30-man training squad for the United States cricket team, ahead of the Regional Finals of the 2018–19 ICC T20 World Cup Americas Qualifier tournament in Bermuda. Later the same month, he was selected to play for the Edmonton Royals franchise team in the 2019 Global T20 Canada tournament.

In June 2021, he was selected to take part in the Minor League Cricket tournament in the United States following the players' draft. In August 2021, Phillip was named as a travelling reserve player for the United States' tour of Oman. In September 2021, Phillip was added to the United States' One Day International (ODI) squad for the series. He made his ODI debut on 17 September 2021, for the United States against Nepal.
