= List of United States Twenty20 International cricketers =

This is a list of United States Twenty20 International cricketers.

In April 2018, the ICC decided to grant full Twenty20 International (T20I) status to all its members. Therefore, all Twenty20 matches played between the United States and other ICC members after 1 January 2019 have the T20I status.

This list comprises names of all members of the U.S. cricket team who have played at least one T20I match. It is initially arranged in the order in which each player won his first Twenty20 cap. Where more than one player won his first Twenty20 cap in the same match, those players are listed alphabetically by surname.

== Key ==
General

- ‡ – Captain
- † – Wicket-keeper
- First – Year of debut
- Last – Year of latest game
- Mat – Number of matches played

Batting

- Runs – Runs scored in career
- HS – Highest score
- 50 – Half-centuries scored
- 100 – Centuries scored
- Avg – Runs scored per dismissal
- * – Batsman remained not out

Bowling

- Balls – Balls bowled in career
- Wkt – Wickets taken in career
- BBI – Best bowling in an innings
- Ave – Average runs per wicket

Fielding

- Ca – Catches taken
- St – Stumpings affected

== List of players ==
Statistics are correct as of 15 February 2026.

United States T20I cricketers
General					Batting					Bowling				Fielding		Ref
No.	Name	First	Last	Mat	Runs	HS	Avg	50	100	Balls	Wkt	BBI	Ave	Ca	St	Ref
1	Aaron Jones ‡	2019	2025	48	770	94*	24.06	2	0	128	8	2/8	18.37	11	0	
2	Elmore Hutchinson	2019	2021	4	16	16	16.00	0	0	48	2	2/7	15.50	0	0	
3	Jessy Singh	2019	2025	30	91	31	7.58	0	0	624	31	3/22	28.67	12	0	
4	Jaskaran Malhotra †	2019	2022	17	267	58	19.07	1	0	24	0	–	–	5	3	
5	Xavier Marshall	2019	2021	14	204	47*	18.54	0	0	–	–	–	–	2	0	
6	Saurabh Netravalkar ‡	2019	2026	44	42	12	7.00	0	0	875	42	5/12	24.97	13	0	
7	Monank Patel ‡†	2019	2026	47	1,011	104	27.32	6	1	–	–	–	–	25	12	
8	Timil Patel	2019	2019	7	17	14*	–	–	–	132	11	4/27	13.27	0	0	
9	Roy Silva	2019	2019	2	32	25	16.00	0	0	12	0	–	–	1	0	
10	Steven Taylor	2019	2025	32	822	101*	31.61	4	1	300	12	2/9	24.83	11	0	
11	Hayden Walsh Jr. (Note: Hayden Walsh Jr. also played T20I cricket for West Indies. Only his records for United States are given above.)	2019	2019	8	114	28	19.00	0	0	101	6	2/21	20.00	2	0	
12	Timroy Allen	2019	2019	5	27	11*	13.50	0	0	18	1	1/11	28.00	3	0	
13	Cameron Gannon	2019	2019	4	12	7*	12.00	0	0	54	3	2/21	22.33	2	0	
14	Nisarg Patel	2019	2024	21	115	28	19.16	0	0	406	27	4/17	13.96	9	0	
15	Karima Gore	2019	2021	8	47	31	23.50	0	0	150	10	3/5	12.40	3	0	
16	Sunny Sohal	2019	2019	3	23	18	11.50	0	0	–	–	–	–	0	0	
17	Ian Holland	2021	2021	6	47	39*	23.50	0	0	138	10	2/3	8.90	1	0	
18	Gajanand Singh	2021	2024	13	164	65	23.42	2	0	–	–	–	–	5	0	
19	Rusty Theron (Note: Rusty Theron also played T20I cricket for South Africa. Only his records for United States are given above.)	2021	2022	9	9	7*	–	0	0	180	12	3/16	18.00	1	0	
20	Ali Khan	2021	2026	21	15	14*	7.50	0	0	433	18	3/23	34.22	3	0	
21	Trinson Carmichael	2021	2021	2	–	–	–	–	–	36	0	–	–	1	0	
22	Ritwik Behera	2021	2021	2	16	16	8.00	0	0	6	0	–	–	4	0	
23	Marty Kain	2021	2022	7	71	39*	14.20	0	0	34	0	–	–	2	0	
24	Sushant Modani	2021	2022	5	93	50	31.00	1	0	6	1	1/2	2.00	2	0	
25	Ryan Scott	2021	2021	2	19	11	9.50	0	0	–	–	–	–	0	0	
26	Yasir Mohammad	2021	2025	13	24	16	6.00	0	0	255	20	4/11	15.30	5	0	
27	Vatsal Vaghela	2021	2025	3	29	29	29.00	0	0	60	7	3/12	5.71	2	0	
28	Cameron Stevenson	2022	2022	4	13	8	4.33	0	0	72	4	1/15	24.50	2	0	
30	Nosthush Kenjige	2024	2026	24	10	6*	2.00	0	0	442	22	3/21	25.18	4	0	
31	Andries Gous †	2024	2026	27	770	81	30.80	6	0	–	–	–	–	7	1	
32	Harmeet Singh	2024	2026	29	242	38	15.12	0	0	616	31	4/18	23.09	8	0	
33	Milind Kumar	2024	2026	25	416	56*	29.71	1	0	192	12	5/16	19.66	19	0	
34	Shadley van Schalkwyk	2024	2026	18	107	18	21.40	0	0	357	28	4/25	18.32	5	0	
35	Corey Anderson (Note: Corey Anderson also played T20I cricket for New Zealand. Only his records for United States are given above.)	2024	2024	11	212	55	26.50	1	0	72	2	1/11	45.00	2	0	
36	Nitish Kumar (Note: Nitish Kumar also played T20I cricket for Canada. Only his records for United States are given above.)	2024	2024	18	277	64	19.78	1	0	24	1	1/13	24.00	10	0	
37	Usman Rafiq	2024	2024	1	–	–	–	–	–	12	0	–	–	0	0	
38	Shayan Jahangir †	2024	2026	22	462	61	30.80	2	0	–	–	–	–	8	3	
39	Juanoy Drysdale	2024	2025	11	5	4*	5.00	0	0	198	11	3/18	26.81	2	0	
40	Saiteja Mukkamalla	2024	2026	21	737	100*	40.94	6	1	–	–	–	–	7	0	
41	Ayan Desai	2024	2025	4	–	–	–	–	–	66	5	2/27	16.00	3	0	
42	Abhishek Paradkar	2024	2024	4	16	10*	16.00	0	0	54	4	3/24	17.50	0	0	
43	Smit Patel	2024	2024	2	35	24	17.50	0	0	–	–	–	–	0	0	
44	Utkarsh Srivastava	2024	2024	2	9	9	9.00	0	0	–	–	–	–	0	0	
45	Sanjay Krishnamurthi	2025	2026	13	196	68*	32.66	1	0	30	2	2/13	10.50	8	0	
46	Ali Sheikh	2025	2025	7	22	17	11.00	0	0	96	1	1/14	85.00	1	0	
47	Stephen Wiig	2025	2025	2	1	1*	–	0	0	30	2	2/11	22.50	0	0	
48	Akhilesh Reddy	2025	2025	4	–	–	–	–	–	96	1	1/14	85.00	1	0	
49	Rahul Jariwala	2025	2025	1	35	35	35.00	0	0	–	–	–	–	0	0	
50	Aarin Nadkarni	2025	2025	1	–	–	–	–	–	12	0	–	–	0	0	
51	Mohammad Mohsin	2026	2026	4	9	8	4.50	0	0	72	4	2/19	18.00	2	0	
52	Shubham Ranjane	2026	2026	4	141	51	70.50	1	0	24	1	1/6	26.00	2	0	
53	Ehsan Adil	2026	2026	1	1	1*	–	0	0	18	0	–	–	0	0	

== See also ==
- List of United States ODI cricketers
