= Elmore Hutchinson =

Jamaican-born American cricketer (born 1982)

Personal information
- Full name: Elmore Howard Hutchinson
- Born: 11 August 1982 (age 44); Westmoreland Parish, Jamaica
- Height: 1.98 m (6 ft 6 in)
- Batting: Right-handed
- Bowling: Left-arm fast-medium
- Role: Bowler

International information
- National side: United States
- ODI debut (cap 25): 13 September 2019 v PNG
- Last ODI: 20 September 2021 v Oman
- T20I debut (cap 2): 15 March 2019 v UAE
- Last T20I: 13 November 2021 v Bahamas

Career statistics
Competition	ODI	T20I	LA	T20
Matches	11	4	31	17
Runs scored	142	16	404	114
Batting average	23.66	16.00	16.16	11.40
100s/50s	0/0	0/0	0/0	0/0
Top score	49*	16	49*	29
Balls bowled	312	48	1,122	252
Wickets	4	2	30	12
Bowling average	56.50	15.50	25.40	25.50
5 wickets in innings	0	0	1	0
10 wickets in match	0	0	0	0
Best bowling	1/12	2/7	5/42	3/22
Catches/stumpings	4/–	0/–	11/–	3/–
- Source: Cricinfo, 26 December 2024

Elmore Howard Hutchinson (born 11 August 1982) is an American cricketer of Jamaican origin. He made his debut for the American national side in March 2012.

== Biography ==
Born in Westmoreland Parish, Jamaica, after emigrating to the U.S. Hutchinson began playing club cricket in California. A left-arm fast-medium bowler, he played for a South West regional side at the 2011, and the following year was selected to debut for the U.S. national side at the 2012 World Twenty20 Qualifier in the United Arab Emirates. There, he took six wickets, behind only Muhammad Ghous and Abhimanyu Rajp for the U.S., and retained his place in the side for the 2012 WCL Division Four tournament later in the year. Hutchinson also played matches with full Twenty20 status at the 2013 World Twenty20 Qualifier in the UAE. Both his best batting and best bowling performances at Twenty20 level came in the 2011 edition of the tournament, when he took figures of 3/22 in Ireland's innings and topscored in the U.S.'s innings of 96 all out, scoring 29 from ninth in the batting order. Only three players – Steven Taylor (16), Orlando Baker, and Muhammad Ghous (both 15) – have played more than Hutchinson's thirteen Twenty20 matches for the United States, and only Ghous (12 to Hutchinson's 10) has taken more wickets.

In January 2018, he was named in the United States squad for the 2017–18 Regional Super50 tournament in the West Indies. He made his List A debut for the United States in the 2017–18 Regional Super50 on 31 January 2018.

In August 2018, he was named in the United States' squad for the 2018–19 ICC World Twenty20 Americas Qualifier tournament in Morrisville, North Carolina. In October 2018, he was named in the United States' squads for the 2018–19 Regional Super50 tournament in the West Indies and for the 2018 ICC World Cricket League Division Three tournament in Oman.

In February 2019, he was named in the United States' Twenty20 International (T20I) squad for their series against the United Arab Emirates. The matches were the first T20I fixtures to be played by the United States cricket team. He made his T20I debut for the United States against the United Arab Emirates on 15 March 2019. In April 2019, he was named in the United States cricket team's squad for the 2019 ICC World Cricket League Division Two tournament in Namibia.

In June 2019, he was named in a 30-man training squad for the United States cricket team, ahead of the Regional Finals of the 2018–19 ICC T20 World Cup Americas Qualifier tournament in Bermuda. The following month, he was one of twelve players to sign a three-month central contract with USA Cricket. In September 2019, he was named in United States's One Day International (ODI) squad for the 2019 United States Tri-Nation Series. He made his ODI debut for the United States, against Papua New Guinea, on 13 September 2019.

In November 2019, he was named in the United States' squad for the 2019–20 Regional Super50 tournament. In June 2021, he was selected to take part in the Minor League Cricket tournament in the United States following the players' draft.

In October 2021, he was named in the American squad for the 2021 ICC Men's T20 World Cup Americas Qualifier tournament in Antigua.
