= Jannisar Khan =

Pakistani American cricketer

Personal information
- Born: 6 October 1981 (age 45); Peshawar, Pakistan
- Batting: Right-handed
- Bowling: Right-arm medium
- Role: All-rounder

International information
- National side: United States (2018-2019)
- Source: Cricinfo, 24 April 2019

Jannisar Khan (born 6 October 1981) is a Pakistani cricketer. He represented the Pakistan national under-19 cricket team and played domestic cricket in Pakistan as a right-handed all-rounder bowling medium pace. He later immigrated to the United States and represented the United States national cricket team from 2018 to 2019.

== Personal life ==
Khan was born on 6 October 1981 in Peshawar, Pakistan. He moved to the United States in 2015 and worked as a youth academy coach in Houston, Texas. He qualified to play for the USA internationally in 2018 after meeting the ICC's three-year residency requirements.

== Pakistan career ==
Khan represented the Pakistan national under-19 cricket team at the 1998 and 2000 Under-19 Cricket World Cups, as well as playing under-19 Test series against Australia and England.

Khan played domestic cricket in Pakistan for Peshawar, Redco Pakistan Limited, Pakistan Customs, and Pakistan International Airlines.

== USA career ==
In August 2018, Khan was named in the United States' squad for the 2018–19 ICC World Twenty20 Americas Qualifier tournament in Morrisville, North Carolina. In October 2018, he was named in the United States' squads for the 2018–19 Regional Super50 tournament in the West Indies and for the 2018 ICC World Cricket League Division Three tournament in Oman. Following the conclusion of the Division Three tournament, he was given a two-match ban for using abusive language towards an umpire in the match against Singapore. In February 2019, he was named in the United States' Twenty20 International (T20I) squad for their series against the United Arab Emirates. The matches were the first T20I fixtures to be played by the United States cricket team.

Khan was named in the squad to allow him to serve out his two-match ban, so he would be available to play for the United States in the 2019 ICC World Cricket League Division Two tournament. In April 2019, he was named in the United States cricket team's squad for the Division Two tournament in Namibia.

In June 2021, he was selected to take part in the Minor League Cricket tournament in the United States following the players' draft.
