= Xavier Marshall =

Jamaican-American cricketer

Personal information
- Full name: Xavier Melbourne Marshall
- Born: 27 March 1986 (age 40); Saint Ann, Jamaica
- Height: 5 ft 9 in (1.75 m)
- Batting: Right-handed
- Bowling: Right-arm offbreak
- Role: Batsman
- Relatives: Rashard Marshall (cousin)

International information
- National sides: West Indies (2005–2009); United States (2019–2021)
- Test debut (cap 261): 13 July 2005; West Indies v Sri Lanka
- Last Test: 4 February 2009; West Indies v England
- ODI debut (cap 125/19): 14 January 2005; West Indies v Australia
- Last ODI: 12 February 2020; United States v Nepal
- T20I debut (cap 25/5): 20 June 2008; West Indies v Australia
- Last T20I: 22 December 2021; United States v Ireland

Domestic team information
- Years: Team
- 2006/07–2012/13: Jamaica

Career statistics
Competition	Test	ODI	T20I	FC
Matches	7	37	20	34
Runs scored	243	596	300	1,397
Batting average	20.25	17.52	17.64	23.67
100s/50s	0/2	1/1	0/0	0/9
Top score	85	157*	47*	85
Catches/stumpings	7/–	12/–	5/–	34/–
- Source: Cricinfo, 24 December 2021

Xavier Melbourne Marshall (born 27 March 1986) is a Jamaican-American cricketer. He played for the West Indies as a batsman. Since January 2019, he has represented the United States cricket team.

== International career ==
Marshall represented the West Indies at the 2006 U-19 Cricket World Cup in Sri Lanka. His 106 from 133 balls helped the West Indies defeat South Africa by 34 runs and progress to the semi-finals of the competition. He played 11 youth One Day Internationals (ODI), scoring 554 runs at an average of 50.36, with a best score of 106.

On 14 January 2005, Marshall made his ODI debut. Batting at number four, he scored five runs from 10 balls against Australia. He was also in the West Indies' ODI squad for the five-match series against South Africa.

On 22 August 2008, Marshall broke the record for most sixes scored in an ODI, previously shared by Sanath Jayasuria and Shahid Afridi. He hit 12 sixes in a score of 157* from 118 balls against Canada as the West Indies won the match by 49 runs. This record stood until 11 April 2011, when Shane Watson hit 15 sixes against Bangladesh.

== Failed drug test ==
In September 2008, Marshall was training for the Stanford Super Series and was forced to withdraw from the team when it became public that he had tested positive in a pre-Series drug test. The West Indies Cricket Board did not announce what substance Marshall had tested positive, but they later announced that they would not be taking action against Marshall, because he was not participating in a West Indies uniform at the time.

== Move to the United States ==
In January 2018, he was named in the United States squad for the 2017–18 Regional Super50 tournament in the West Indies.

In February 2019, he was named in the United States' Twenty20 International (T20I) squad for their series against the United Arab Emirates. The matches were the first T20I fixtures to be played by the United States cricket team. He made his T20I debut for the United States against the United Arab Emirates on 15 March 2019. As a result, he became the seventh cricketer to represent two international teams in T20Is.

In April 2019, he was named in the United States cricket team's squad for the 2019 ICC World Cricket League Division Two tournament in Namibia. On 24 April 2019, in the match against Hong Kong, Marshall scored his first century for the United States. The United States finished in the top four places in the tournament, therefore gaining One Day International (ODI) status. Marshall made his ODI debut for the United States on 27 April 2019, against Papua New Guinea, in the tournament's third-place playoff and became the 11th cricketer to represent two international teams in ODIs. He was the leading run-scorer for the United States in the tournament, with 182 runs in six matches.

In June 2019, he was named in a 30-man training squad for the United States cricket team, ahead of the Regional Finals of the 2018–19 ICC T20 World Cup Americas Qualifier tournament in Bermuda. The following month, he was one of five players to sign a 12-month central contract with USA Cricket. In August 2019, he was named in the United States' squad for the Regional Finals of the 2018–19 ICC T20 World Cup Americas Qualifier tournament.

In November 2019, he was named in the United States' squad for the 2019–20 Regional Super50 tournament. In June 2021, he was selected to take part in the Minor League Cricket tournament in the United States following the players' draft.

In October 2021, he was named in the American squad for the 2021 ICC Men's T20 World Cup Americas Qualifier tournament in Antigua.

== Awards ==
Xavier Marshall was named the West Indian Youth Cricketer of the Year in June 2005.
