= Jaskaran Malhotra =

American cricketer

Personal information
- Born: 4 November 1989 (age 37); Chandigarh, India
- Batting: Right-handed
- Bowling: Right-arm off break
- Role: Wicket-keeper

International information
- National side: United States
- ODI debut (cap 18): 27 April 2019 v PNG
- Last ODI: 17 September 2022 v Namibia
- T20I debut (cap 4): 15 March 2019 v UAE
- Last T20I: 17 July 2022 v PNG

Career statistics
Competition	ODI	T20I	LA
Matches	7	6	27
Runs scored	228	112	646
Batting average	45.60	18.66	26.91
100s/50s	1/0	0/0	1/3
Top score	173*	38	173*
Catches/stumpings	5/1	2/3	18/3
- Source: ESPNcricinfo, 17 September 2022

Jaskaran Malhotra (Punjabi: ਜਸਕਰਣ ਮਲ੍ਹੋਤ੍ਰਾ; born November 4, 1989) is an Indian-born American cricketer. He has played for the United States cricket team since January 2018, and made his full international debut for the side in March 2019.

== Early life ==
Malhotra was born in Chandigarh, India, and captained Himachal Pradesh at the under-19 level. He immigrated to the United States in 2014, settling in New York City.

== US career ==
In January 2018, he was named in the United States squad for the 2017–18 Regional Super50 tournament in the West Indies. He made his List A debut for the United States against the Leeward Islands in the 2017–18 Regional Super50 on January 31, 2018.

In August 2018, he was named in the United States' squad for the 2018–19 ICC World Twenty20 Americas Qualifier tournament in Morrisville, North Carolina. In October 2018, he was named in the United States' squads for the 2018–19 Regional Super50 tournament in the West Indies and for the 2018 ICC World Cricket League Division Three tournament in Oman.

In February 2019, he was named in the United States' Twenty20 International (T20I) squad for their series against the United Arab Emirates. The matches were the first T20I fixtures to be played by the United States team. He made his T20I debut against the United Arab Emirates on 15 March 2019.

In April 2019, he was named in the United States cricket team's squad for the 2019 ICC World Cricket League Division Two tournament in Namibia. The United States finished in the top four places in the tournament, therefore gaining One Day International (ODI) status. Malhotra made his ODI debut for the United States on 27 April 2019, against Papua New Guinea, in the tournament's third-place playoff.

In June 2019, he was named in a 30-man training squad for the United States cricket team, ahead of the Regional Finals of the 2018–19 ICC T20 World Cup Americas Qualifier tournament in Bermuda. The following month, he was one of twelve players to sign a three-month central contract with USA Cricket. In August 2019, he was named in the United States' squad for the Regional Finals of the 2018–19 ICC T20 World Cup Americas Qualifier tournament. In June 2021, he was selected to take part in the Minor League Cricket tournament in the United States following the players' draft.

On September 9, 2021, Malhotra hit six sixes in one over, off the bowling of Gaudi Toka, becoming the second cricketer to achieve this in an ODI match. He also became the first batsman for the United States to score a century in ODI cricket, finishing with 173 not out from 124 balls.

In October 2021, he was named in the American squad for the 2021 ICC Men's T20 World Cup Americas Qualifier tournament in Antigua.

== Personal life ==
Malhotra currently resides in Maryland, US. He coaches for the Baltimore Royals academy in Columbia, Maryland. He is also the skipper for the Baltimore Royals minor league team.
