= Karima Gore =

West Indian cricketer

Personal information
- Born: 25 June 1998 (age 28); The Bronx, New York, United States
- Batting: Right-handed
- Bowling: Slow Left arm Orthodox
- Role: Bowler

International information
- National sides: United States (2019–2021); West Indies (2025-present)
- ODI debut (cap 16): 27 April 2019; United States v PNG
- Last ODI: 20 September 2021; United States v Oman
- T20I debut (cap 15/109): 21 August 2019; United States v Canada
- Last T20I: 30 September 2025; West Indies v Nepal
- Source: Cricinfo, September 30, 2025

Karima Gore (born June 25, 1998) is an American cricketer. In April 2019, he was named in the United States' squad for the 2019 ICC World Cricket League Division Two tournament in Namibia. He made his List A debut for the United States against Namibia in the 2019 ICC World Cricket League Division Two tournament on April 21, 2019. The United States finished in the top four places in the tournament, therefore gaining One Day International (ODI) status. Gore made his ODI debut for the United States on April 27, 2019, against Papua New Guinea, in the tournament's third-place playoff.

== Early life ==
He was born in the United States to Antiguan parents.

== Domestic career ==
Prior to his List A debut, he played in several 50-over matches for the United States against the United Arab Emirates in March 2019. Gore has also played cricket in Antigua and Barbuda, including matches alongside his father. In 2014, Gore was the leading run-scorer and wicket-taker in the United Insurance Schools U19 competition.

In June 2019, he was named in a 30-man training squad for the United States cricket team, ahead of the Regional Finals of the 2018–19 ICC T20 World Cup Americas Qualifier tournament in Bermuda. The following month, he was one of twelve players to sign a three-month central contract with USA Cricket. In August 2019, he was named in the United States' squad for the Regional Finals of the 2018–19 ICC T20 World Cup Americas Qualifier tournament. He made his Twenty20 International (T20I) debut for the United States against Canada on August 21, 2019.

In November 2019, he was named in the United States' squad for the 2019–20 Regional Super50 tournament. In June 2021, he was selected to take part in the Minor League Cricket tournament in the United States following the players' draft. In October 2021, he was named in the American squad for the 2021 ICC Men's T20 World Cup Americas Qualifier tournament in Antigua.
