= Saurabh Netravalkar =

Indian-born cricketer (born 1991)

Personal information
- Full name: Saurabh Naresh Netravalkar
- Born: October 16, 1991 (age 35); Mumbai, Maharashtra, India
- Height: 6 ft 0 in (183 cm)
- Batting: Right-handed
- Bowling: Left-arm fast-medium
- Role: Bowler

International information
- National side: United States
- ODI debut (cap 20): April 27, 2019 v PNG
- Last ODI: November 3, 2025 v UAE
- ODI shirt no.: 20
- T20I debut (cap 6): March 15, 2019 v UAE
- Last T20I: February 15, 2026 v Namibia

Domestic team information
- Years: Team
- 2023–present: Washington Freedom
- 2025: Rangpur Riders
- 2025: Trinbago Knight Riders
- 2025/26: Sharjah Warriorz
- 2026: Belfast Wolves

Career statistics
Competition	ODI	T20I	FC	LA
Matches	67	44	1	99
Runs scored	150	42	3	248
Batting average	9.37	7.00	1.50	8.00
100s/50s	0/0	0/0	0/0	0/0
Top score	19*	12	3	22
Balls bowled	3,445	875	192	5,150
Wickets	108	42	3	152
Bowling average	21.23	24.97	25.66	23.51
5 wickets in innings	2	1	0	2
10 wickets in match	0	0	0	0
Best bowling	5/32	5/12	2/42	5/32
Catches/stumpings	17/–	13/–	1/–	23/–
- Source: Cricinfo, February 15, 2026

Saurabh Naresh Netravalkar (born October 16, 1991) is a cricketer and software engineer who plays for the United States team and Washington Freedom in the MLC. He is a left-arm medium-fast bowler who represented the India under-19 team. He made his first-class debut for Mumbai in the 2013–14 Ranji Trophy on December 22, 2013. He made his List A debut on February 27, 2014, for Mumbai in the 2013–14 Vijay Hazare Trophy.

Netravalkar is presently working for Oracle, and is on a H-1B visa. According to his LinkedIn profile, he currently works for Oracle as a principal member of technical staff (PMTS).

== Early life and education ==
Netravalkar was born in Mumbai, India to Goan parents from Netravali. He studied at Sardar Patel Institute of Technology and later at Cornell University. He moved to United States in 2015 to pursue a master's degree in computer science at Cornell University. His strong academic credentials and keen interest in cricket helped him develop a player-analysis app CricDecode. As he finished graduate school, Netravalkar was offered a job by Oracle in San Francisco.

== Career ==
=== Junior cricket ===
His talent was spotted when he bowled out fellow Indian cricketer Yuvraj Singh at the NCA in Bengaluru while he was on Air India's sports scholarship in 2009. His delivery to dismiss Yuvraj Singh eventually caught the attention of the cricketing fraternity and landed him an opportunity to play in the prestigious BCCI Corporate Trophy, where he shared dressing room with Singh, Robin Uthappa and Suresh Raina. He eventually ended the BCCI Corporate Trophy as the joint highest wicket-taker. He grew in leaps and bounds with his bowling at the 2008/09 Cooch Behar Trophy where he took a tally of 30 scalps in 6 matches. He also spearheaded India's bowling unit in an Under-19 Tri-nation series held in South Africa leading up to the 2010 ICC Under-19 Cricket World Cup by taking 8 wickets.

He represented India in the 2010 U19 World Cup while playing for India U19. In the tournament he played alongside KL Rahul, Jaydev Unadkat and Mayank Agarwal who all later played for the Indian national cricket team. He also sacrificed his academic participation in order to take part at the 2010 ICC U19 World Cup, as he had to miss first semester exams of his Computer Engineering degree which he actually committed to six months earlier than the start of the tournament. Initially, his sacrifice paid rich dividends as he ended up the 2010 U19 World Cup as the leading wicket taker of the tournament for India capturing nine wickets in as many as six matches with a bowling average of 17.22. Eventually, India were knocked out in the quarter-final by rivals Pakistan in a rain affected match which ended in thrilling fashion. Despite his memorable performances with the ball, he failed to make the India national cricket team or the Mumbai team, as it was already a pace heavy star studded lineup which had the likes of Zaheer Khan, Aavishkar Salvi, Ajit Agarkar and Dhawal Kulkarni.

=== International cricket ===
In 2016, he turned up for the North West Region at the USACA National Championship. He went out to seek opportunities to play as much as possible when the ICC lowered their minimum residency for eligibility from four years to three. He delivered a clinical spell for Southern California Cricket Association XI against a USA XI in a national-team warm-up match in the summer of 2017 which caught the attention of the then head coach of US national team Pubudu Dassanayake.

In January 2018, he was selected in the United States national cricket team for the 2017–18 Regional Super50 tournament in the West Indies. He made his List A debut in American colours against Leeward Islands where he took 2 for 45 in 10 overs, although USA lost by a margin of 162 runs. In August 2018, he was named in the United States' squad for the 2018–19 ICC World Twenty20 Americas Qualifier tournament in Morrisville, North Carolina. In October 2018, USA Cricket appointed him as the captain of the United States team for the 2018–19 Regional Super50 tournament in the West Indies and the 2018 ICC World Cricket League Division Three tournament in Oman.

In February 2019, he became US's captain in Twenty20 International (T20I). He led them in a series against UAE. The matches were the first T20I fixtures to be played by the United States national team. He debuted in T20I in that series on March 15, 2019. Further the USA cricket association announced him as their captain for Division 2 U19 World Cup, Namibia in April 2019. The US finished in the top four places in the tournament, therefore gaining One Day International (ODI) status. Netravalkar made his ODI debut for the United States on April 27, 2019, against Papua New Guinea, in the tournament's third-place playoff.

In June 2019, he got selected in a 30-man training squad for the United States cricket team, ahead of the Regional Finals of the 2018–19 ICC T20 World Cup Americas Qualifier tournament in Bermuda. The following month, he was one of twelve players to sign a three-month central contract with USA Cricket. In August 2019, his name was announced as the captain of the United States' team for the Regional Finals of the 2018–19 ICC T20 World Cup Americas Qualifier tournament.

In November 2019, he led US in the 2019–20 Regional Super50 tournament. Following to this he played and captained United States's in the 2019 United Arab Emirates Tri-Nation Series. In the opening match of the series, against the United Arab Emirates, he took five wickets for 32 runs. He became the first bowler for the United States to take a five-wicket haul in an ODI match. In September 2020, he was signed by the Golden State Grizzlies team for the 2021 Minor League Cricket season.

In October 2021, he played in 2021 ICC Men's T20 World Cup Americas Qualifier tournament in Antigua. In May 2022, he was part of the team which participated in round 12 and round 13 of the 2019–2023 ICC Cricket World Cup League 2 tournament. In the second match of the twelfth round, he became the USA's leading wicket-taker in limited overs cricket.

In June 2022, he played in 2022 ICC Men's T20 World Cup Global Qualifier B tournament in Zimbabwe. In the USA's second match of the tournament, against Singapore, he became the first bowler for the United States to take a five-wicket haul in a T20I match.

On June 6, 2024, Netravalkar gained international fame and became an overnight sensation after playing a pivotal role in engineering a famous victory against Pakistan by bowling the super over during the 2024 ICC Men's T20 World Cup. He successfully defended 18 runs in the super over to help America register a remarkable upset victory over much favored opponents in the calibre of Pakistan marking America's second consecutive win in the tournament. The victory lifted America to the top of the table in their Group and increased the qualification chances for the Super Eight round. Following his performance, his colleagues at Oracle acknowledged his achievement in cricket and he apparently took office leave until 17 June 2024, according to some reports. He got the wickets of Rohit Sharma and Virat Kohli cheaply and gave the mighty Indian cricket team a run for their money when the two teams met in the World T20 group fixture at New York. He also dropped Suryakumar Yadav's catch at a critical juncture of the game, which India eventually won by 7 wickets with Yadav scoring an unbeaten half-century.

In January 2026, Netravalkar was named in USA's squad for the 2026 T20 World Cup. In his first match against India of that tournament, he broke Sanath Jayasuriya’s record of conceding the most runs in a T20 World Cup match, conceding 65 runs in his 4 overs while going wicketless.

=== Domestic and franchise cricket ===
In March 2023, Netravalkar was picked by the Washington Freedom in the player's draft to play in Major League Cricket. He eventually was the third highest wicket-taker of the inaugural edition of the Major League Cricket Tournament in 2023 season which also included a spell of 6/9 against San Francisco Unicorns. In October 2024, he was picked by the Rangpur Riders in the player's draft to play in Bangladesh Premier League.
