= List of cricketers who have played for two international teams =

As of April 2024, 17 male players have played Test cricket for two nations, 16 have played One Day International (ODI) cricket for two teams, and 19 have played Twenty20 International (T20I) matches for two teams, and five have played for two teams in different international formats.

In the late-19th and early-20th centuries, players who had represented two international teams had been born in one country and moved to another with family. There were no clear rules on which nation one could represent, so switching was possible. More recently, citizenship has become the defining attribute as to whether a player can represent more than one international team. The eligibility policy set by the International Cricket Council (ICC) states that a cricketer who has played for a Full Member side must wait three years since their last match before playing for an Associate team. However, if a cricketer plays for an Associate team first, they can switch to a Full Member team the next day.

Billy Midwinter was the first cricketer to play for two nations during his career, playing two Test matches for Australia in 1877 before appearing for England in four Tests in 1881–82. Within a year he was representing Australia once again. The Bulletin noted that "In Australia he plays as an Englishman; in England, as an Australian; and he is always a credit to himself and his country ... whichever that may be." Four other Test cricketers switched allegiance from Australia to England in the late-19th century: Billy Murdoch, J. J. Ferris, Sammy Woods and Albert Trott. Both Frank Hearne and Frank Mitchell started their international careers playing for England but went on to play for the South African Test team. Three cricketers Abdul Hafeez Kardar, Gul Mohammad and Amir Elahi moved from representing India to Pakistan in the 1950s. John Traicos revived his Test career after playing for South Africa in 1970, albeit briefly, when he featured for Zimbabwe in four Test matches in the early 1990s, more than 22 years after his previous international Test appearance.

Kepler Wessels played both Test and ODI cricket for South Africa and Australia, while Guyana-born Clayton Lambert became the first cricketer to play just ODIs for two nations – after playing eleven matches for the West Indies between 1990 and 1998 (also five Tests), he played a single ODI for the United States in 2004. Barbados-born Anderson Cummins made 63 ODI appearances for the West Indies before playing 13 times for Canada after a twelve-year gap. Gavin Hamilton played his only Test for one team (England) and his entire ODI and T20I career for another (Scotland) and Ryan Campbell played his entire ODI career solely for one team (Australia) and his entire T20I career solely for another team (Hong Kong). Gregory Strydom played ODIs for Zimbabwe in 2006 and T20Is for Cayman Islands in 2019. Both Dougie Brown and Ed Joyce began their international careers with England before switching teams, to Scotland and Ireland, while Eoin Morgan and Boyd Rankin made the opposite move, beginning with Ireland before switching to England. Luke Ronchi became the first player since Kepler Wessels to play for two Full Members of the International Cricket Council (ICC), making his ODI and T20I debuts for New Zealand in 2013 after having played for Australia in both formats five years earlier.

The list omits Dermot Reeve who played for Hong Kong and England.

Note: These lists include only those players who have played Test matches, ODIs or T20Is accredited by the International Cricket Council.

== Key ==
General

- Career – Year of debut to year of last game
- Matches – Number of matches played

Batting

- Runs – Runs scored in career
- HS – Highest score
- Avg – Runs scored per dismissal
- 100 – Centuries scored
- * – Batsman remained not out

Bowling

- Wkt – Wickets taken in career
- BB – Best bowling in an innings
- Avg – Average runs per wicket
- 5WI – Five wicket hauls

Fielding

- Ct – Catches taken
- St – Stumpings taken

== Men's cricket ==
=== Test cricket ===
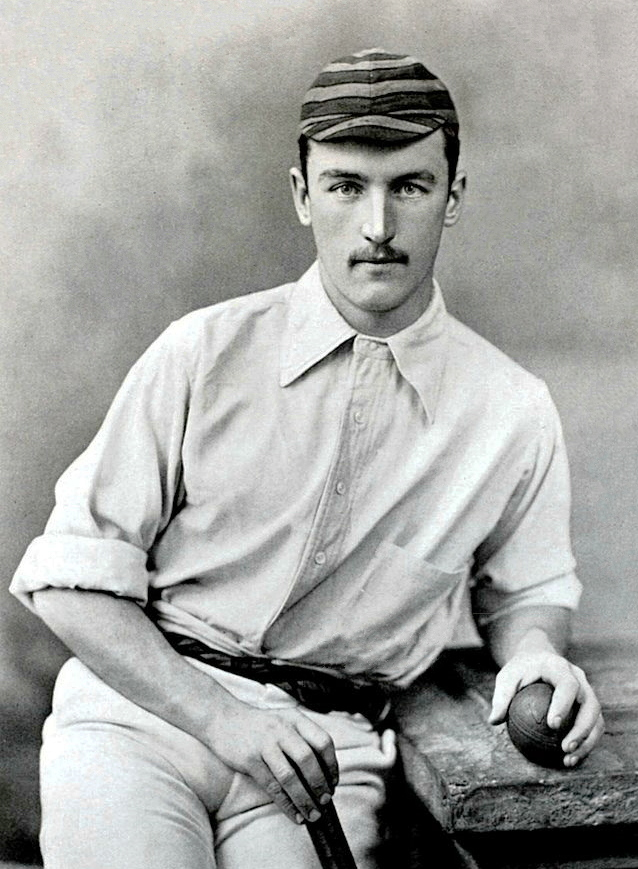
J. J. Ferris played Test cricket for both Australia and England.

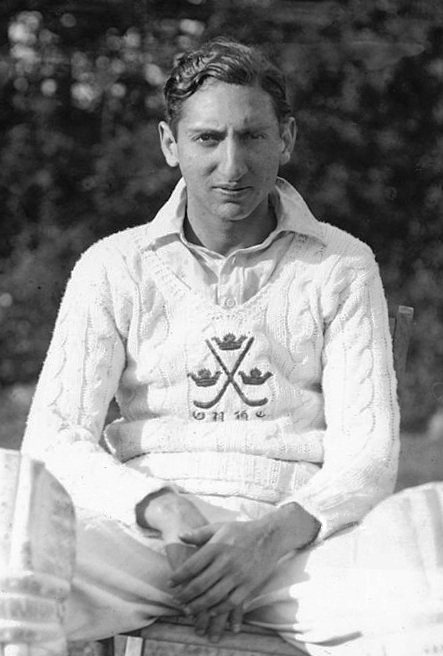
Iftikhar Ali Khan, the 8th Nawab of Pataudi, is the only cricketer to have played for both England and India.

Seventeen men have represented two nations in Test cricket. List updated to 6 February 2025 (Test #2581).

| Name | Team | Career | Matches | Runs | HS | Avg | 100 | Wkt | BB | Avg | 5WI | Ct | St | Ref(s) |
| Name | Team | Career | Matches | Batting | | | | Bowling | | | | Fielding | | Ref(s) |
|---|---|---|---|---|---|---|---|---|---|---|---|---|---|---|
| Billy Midwinter | Australia | 1877–87 | 8 | 174 | 37 | 13.38 | 0 | 14 | 5/78 | 23.78 | 1 | 5 | 0 | |
| Billy Midwinter | England | 1881–82 | 4 | 95 | 36 | 13.57 | 0 | 10 | 4/81 | 27.20 | 0 | 5 | 0 | |
| Billy Murdoch | Australia | 1877–90 | 18 | 896 | 211 | 32.00 | 2 | – | – | – | – | 14 | 0 | |
| Billy Murdoch | England | 1892 | 1 | 12 | 12 | 12.00 | 0 | – | – | – | – | 0 | 1 | |
| J. J. Ferris | Australia | 1887–90 | 8 | 98 | 20* | 8.16 | 0 | 48 | 5/26 | 14.25 | 4 | 4 | 0 | |
| J. J. Ferris | England | 1892 | 1 | 16 | 16 | 16.00 | 0 | 13 | 7/37 | 7.00 | 2 | 0 | 0 | |
| Sammy Woods | Australia | 1888 | 3 | 32 | 18 | 5.33 | 0 | 5 | 2/35 | 24.20 | 0 | 1 | 0 | |
| Sammy Woods | England | 1896 | 3 | 122 | 53 | 30.50 | 0 | 5 | 3/28 | 25.80 | 0 | 4 | 0 | |
| Frank Hearne | England | 1889 | 2 | 47 | 27 | 23.50 | 0 | – | – | – | – | 1 | 0 | |
| Frank Hearne | South Africa | 1892–96 | 4 | 121 | 30 | 15.12 | 0 | 2 | 2/40 | 20.00 | 0 | 2 | 0 | |
| Albert Trott | Australia | 1895 | 3 | 205 | 85* | 102.50 | 0 | 9 | 8/43 | 21.33 | 1 | 4 | 0 | |
| Albert Trott | England | 1899 | 2 | 23 | 16 | 5.75 | 0 | 17 | 5/49 | 11.64 | 1 | 0 | 0 | |
| Frank Mitchell | England | 1899 | 2 | 88 | 41 | 22.00 | 0 | – | – | – | – | 2 | 0 | |
| Frank Mitchell | South Africa | 1912 | 3 | 28 | 12 | 4.66 | 0 | – | – | – | – | 0 | 0 | |
| Nawab of Pataudi (snr) | England | 1932–34 | 3 | 144 | 102 | 28.80 | 1 | – | – | – | – | 0 | 0 | |
| Nawab of Pataudi (snr) | India | 1946 | 3 | 55 | 22 | 11.00 | 0 | – | – | – | – | 0 | 0 | |
| Gul Mohammad | India | 1946–52 | 8 | 166 | 34 | 11.06 | 0 | 2 | 2/21 | 12.00 | 0 | 3 | 0 | |
| Gul Mohammad | Pakistan | 1956 | 1 | 39 | 27* | 39.00 | 0 | – | – | – | – | 0 | 0 | |
| Abdul Hafeez Kardar | India | 1946 | 3 | 80 | 43 | 16.00 | 0 | – | – | – | – | 1 | 0 | |
| Abdul Hafeez Kardar | Pakistan | 1952–58 | 23 | 847 | 93 | 24.91 | 0 | 21 | 3/35 | 45.42 | 0 | 15 | 0 | |
| Amir Elahi | India | 1947 | 1 | 17 | 13 | 8.50 | 0 | – | – | – | – | 0 | 0 | |
| Amir Elahi | Pakistan | 1952 | 5 | 65 | 47 | 10.83 | 0 | 7 | 4/134 | 35.42 | 0 | 0 | 0 | |
| Sammy Guillen | West Indies | 1951–52 | 5 | 104 | 54 | 26.00 | 0 | – | – | – | – | 9 | 2 | |
| Sammy Guillen | New Zealand | 1956 | 3 | 98 | 41 | 16.33 | 0 | – | – | – | – | 4 | 1 | |
| Kepler Wessels | Australia | 1982–85 | 24 | 1761 | 179 | 42.95 | 4 | 0 | – | – | 0 | 18 | 0 | |
| Kepler Wessels | South Africa | 1992–94 | 16 | 1027 | 118 | 38.03 | 2 | – | – | – | – | 12 | 0 | |
| John Traicos | South Africa | 1970 | 3 | 8 | 5* | 4.00 | 0 | 4 | 2/70 | 51.75 | 0 | 4 | 0 | |
| John Traicos | Zimbabwe | 1992–93 | 4 | 11 | 5 | 2.75 | 0 | 14 | 5/86 | 40.14 | 1 | 4 | 0 | |
| Boyd Rankin | England | 2014 | 1 | 13 | 13 | 6.50 | 0 | 1 | 1/47 | 81.00 | 0 | 0 | 0 | |
| Boyd Rankin | Ireland | 2018–19 | 2 | 30 | 17 | 10.00 | 0 | 7 | 2/5 | 31.86 | 0 | 0 | 0 | |
| Gary Ballance | England | 2014–17 | 23 | 1498 | 156 | 37.45 | 4 | 0 | – | – | 0 | 22 | 0 | |
| Gary Ballance | Zimbabwe | 2023 | 1 | 155 | 137* | 155.00 | 1 | – | – | – | – | 0 | 0 | |
| PJ Moor | Zimbabwe | 2014–2019 | 8 | 533 | 83 | 35.53 | 0 | – | – | – | – | 9 | 1 | |
| PJ Moor | Ireland | 2023–2025 | 7 | 201 | 79 | 14.35 | 0 | – | – | – | – | 3 | 0 | |

=== One Day International cricket ===
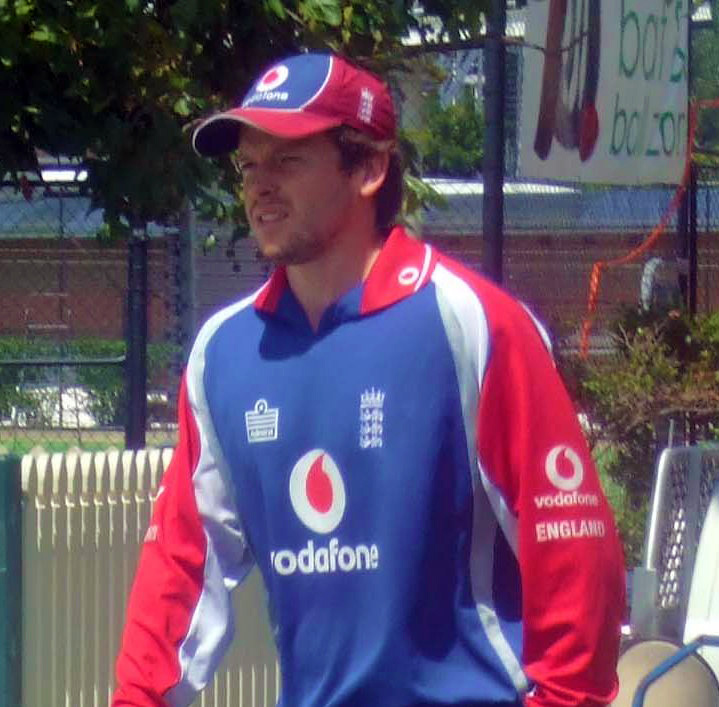
Ed Joyce played 17 ODIs for England before representing Ireland.

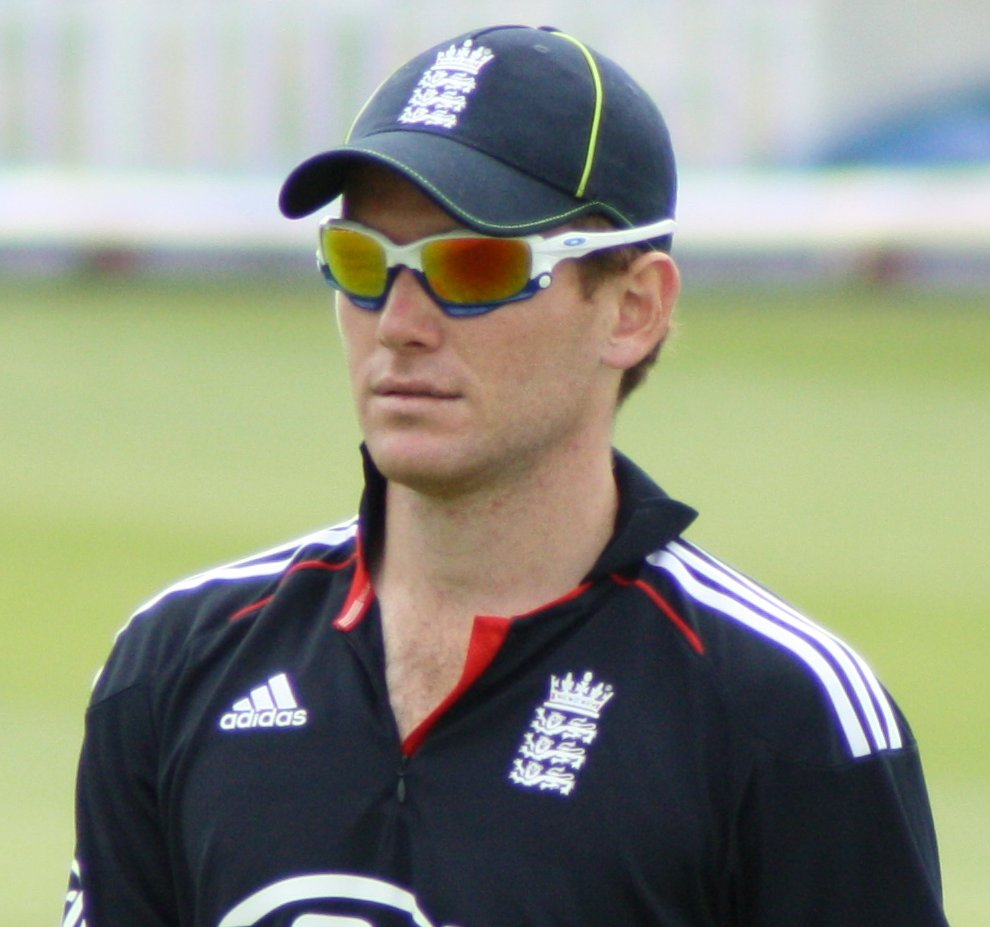
Eoin Morgan played ODIs for Ireland before playing for England.

Seventeen men have played international cricket for two ODI teams. List updated to 24 January 2026 (ODI #4941).

| Name | Team | Career | Matches | Runs | HS | Avg | 100 | Wkt | BB | Avg | 4WI | Ct | St | Ref(s) |
| Name | Team | Career | Matches | Batting | | | | Bowling | | | | Fielding | | Ref(s) |
|---|---|---|---|---|---|---|---|---|---|---|---|---|---|---|
| Kepler Wessels | Australia | 1983–85 | 54 | 1740 | 107 | 36.25 | 1 | 18 | 2/16 | 36.38 | 0 | 19 | 0 | |
| Kepler Wessels | South Africa | 1991–94 | 55 | 1627 | 90 | 32.54 | 2 | 0 | – | – | 0 | 30 | 0 | |
| Clayton Lambert | West Indies | 1990–98 | 12 | 368 | 119 | 33.45 | 1 | 0 | – | – | 0 | 0 | 0 | |
| Clayton Lambert | USA | 2004 | 1 | 39 | 39 | 39.00 | 0 | 0 | – | – | 0 | 0 | 0 | |
| Anderson Cummins | West Indies | 1991–95 | 63 | 459 | 44* | 15.30 | 0 | 78 | 5/31 | 28.79 | 3 | 11 | 0 | |
| Anderson Cummins | Canada | 2007 | 13 | 27 | 9* | 4.50 | 0 | 13 | 3/60 | 48.53 | 0 | 3 | 0 | |
| Dougie Brown | England | 1997–98 | 9 | 99 | 21 | 24.75 | 0 | 7 | 2/28 | 43.57 | 0 | 1 | 0 | |
| Dougie Brown | Scotland | 2006–07 | 16 | 220 | 50* | 15.71 | 0 | 15 | 3/37 | 40.93 | 0 | 3 | 0 | |
| Geraint Jones | England | 2004–06 | 49 | 815 | 80 | 24.69 | 0 | – | – | – | – | 68 | 4 | |
| Geraint Jones | PNG | 2014 | 2 | 47 | 25 | 23.50 | 0 | – | – | – | – | 0 | 0 | |
| Ed Joyce | England | 2006–07 | 17 | 471 | 107 | 27.70 | 1 | – | – | – | – | 6 | 0 | |
| Ed Joyce | Ireland | 2011–18 | 61 | 2151 | 160* | 41.36 | 5 | – | – | – | – | 21 | 0 | |
| Eoin Morgan | Ireland | 2006–09 | 23 | 744 | 115 | 35.42 | 1 | – | – | – | – | 9 | 0 | |
| Eoin Morgan | England | 2009–22 | 225 | 6957 | 148 | 39.75 | 12 | – | – | – | – | 78 | 0 | |
| Boyd Rankin | Ireland | 2007–12; 2016–20 | 68 | 95 | 18* | 7.91 | 0 | 96 | 4/15 | 28.27 | 3 | 17 | 0 | |
| Boyd Rankin | England | 2013–14 | 7 | 5 | 4 | 5.00 | 0 | 10 | 4/46 | 24.10 | 1 | 0 | 0 | |
| Luke Ronchi | Australia | 2008 | 4 | 76 | 64 | 38.00 | 0 | – | – | – | – | 5 | 2 | |
| Luke Ronchi | New Zealand | 2013–17 | 81 | 1321 | 170* | 23.17 | 1 | – | – | – | – | 100 | 10 | |
| Mark Chapman | Hong Kong | 2015 | 2 | 151 | 124* | 151.00 | 1 | – | – | – | – | 12 | 0 | |
| Mark Chapman | New Zealand | 2018–25 | 30 | 781 | 132 | 33.95 | 2 | – | – | – | – | 7 | 0 | |
| Xavier Marshall | West Indies | 2005–09 | 24 | 375 | 157* | 17.85 | 1 | – | – | – | – | 9 | 0 | |
| Xavier Marshall | United States | 2019–20 | 13 | 221 | 50 | 17.00 | 0 | – | – | – | – | 3 | 0 | |
| Roelof van der Merwe | South Africa | 2009–10 | 13 | 39 | 12 | 9.75 | 0 | 17 | 3/27 | 33.00 | 0 | 3 | 0 | |
| Roelof van der Merwe | Netherlands | 2019–25 | 26 | 239 | 57 | 14.93 | 0 | 28 | 3/14 | 35.21 | 0 | 10 | 0 | |
| Rusty Theron | South Africa | 2010 | 4 | 5 | 5 | 5.00 | 0 | 12 | 5/44 | 14.41 | 1 | 4 | 0 | |
| Rusty Theron | United States | 2019–22 | 14 | 45 | 12 | 5.00 | 0 | 19 | 4/56 | 26.00 | 1 | 3 | 0 | |
| Hayden Walsh | United States | 2019 | 1 | 27 | 27 | 27.00 | 0 | 0 | 0 | 0 | 0 | 0 | 0 | |
| Hayden Walsh | West Indies | 2019–24 | 24 | 149 | 46* | 14.90 | 0 | 28 | 5/39 | 35.75 | 2 | 4 | 0 | |
| David Wiese | South Africa | 2015–16 | 6 | 102 | 41* | 20.40 | 0 | 9 | 3/50 | 35.11 | 0 | 2 | 0 | |
| David Wiese | Namibia | 2022 | 9 | 228 | 67 | 28.50 | 0 | 6 | 2/22 | 61.66 | 0 | 2 | 0 | |
| Gary Ballance | England | 2013–15 | 16 | 297 | 79 | 21.21 | 0 | – | – | – | – | 22 | 0 | |
| Gary Ballance | Zimbabwe | 2023 | 5 | 157 | 64* | 39.25 | 0 | – | – | – | – | 5 | 0 | |
| Shehan Jayasuriya | Sri Lanka | 2015–20 | 12 | 195 | 96 | 23 | 0 | – | – | – | – | 22 | 0 | |
| Shehan Jayasuriya | United States | 2026–present | 4 | 104 | 50 | 39.25 | 0 | – | – | – | – | 5 | 0 | |

=== Twenty20 International cricket ===
26 men have represented two teams in T20I cricket. List updated to 2 April 2026 (T20I #3794).

| Name | Team | Career | Matches | Runs | HS | Avg | 50 | Wkt | BB | Avg | 4WI | Ct | St | Ref(s) |
| Name | Team | Career | Matches | Batting | | | | Bowling | | | | Fielding | | Ref(s) |
|---|---|---|---|---|---|---|---|---|---|---|---|---|---|---|
| Ed Joyce | England | 2006–07 | 2 | 1 | 1 | 1.00 | 0 | – | – | – | – | 0 | 0 | |
| Ed Joyce | Ireland | 2012–14 | 16 | 404 | 78* | 36.72 | 1 | – | – | – | – | 5 | 0 | |
| Luke Ronchi | Australia | 2008–09 | 3 | 47 | 36 | 23.50 | 0 | – | – | – | – | 0 | 0 | |
| Luke Ronchi | New Zealand | 2013–17 | 29 | 312 | 51* | 18.35 | 1 | – | – | – | – | 24 | 5 | |
| Dirk Nannes | Netherlands | 2009 | 2 | 6 | 6 | 6.00 | 0 | 1 | 1/26 | 56.00 | 0 | 0 | 0 | |
| Dirk Nannes | Australia | 2009–10 | 15 | 16 | 12* | 16.00 | 0 | 27 | 4/18 | 14.92 | 1 | 1 | 0 | |
| Boyd Rankin | Ireland | 2009–12; 2016–20 | 48 | 64 | 16* | 9.14 | 0 | 54 | 3/16 | 22.12 | 0 | 16 | 0 | |
| Boyd Rankin | England | 2013 | 2 | – | – | – | – | 1 | 1/24 | 24.00 | 0 | 0 | 0 | |
| Roelof van der Merwe | South Africa | 2009–10 | 13 | 57 | 48 | 19.00 | 0 | 14 | 2/14 | 21.78 | 0 | 6 | 0 | |
| Roelof van der Merwe | Netherlands | 2015–26 | 58 | 518 | 75* | 21.58 | 2 | 61 | 4/35 | 19.27 | 0 | 24 | 0 | |
| Mark Chapman | Hong Kong | 2014–16 | 19 | 392 | 63* | 23.05 | 1 | 3 | 1/10 | 25.66 | 0 | 4 | 0 | |
| Mark Chapman | New Zealand | 2018–26 | 94 | 1,682 | 104* | 26.69 | 10 | 1 | 1/9 | 22.00 | 0 | 44 | 0 | |
| Xavier Marshall | West Indies | 2008–09 | 6 | 96 | 36 | 16.00 | 0 | – | – | – | – | 3 | 0 | |
| Xavier Marshall | United States | 2019–21 | 14 | 204 | 47* | 18.54 | 0 | – | – | – | – | 2 | 0 | |
| Izatullah Dawlatzai | Afghanistan | 2012 | 4 | 0 | 0* | – | 0 | 6 | 3/33 | 22.33 | 0 | 1 | 0 | |
| Izatullah Dawlatzai | Germany | 2019–20 | 12 | 26 | 24* | 26.00 | 0 | 12 | 3/23 | 20.66 | 0 | 2 | 0 | |
| Hayden Walsh | United States | 2019 | 8 | 114 | 28 | 19.00 | 0 | 6 | 2/21 | 20.00 | 0 | 2 | 0 | |
| Hayden Walsh | West Indies | 2019–24 | 31 | 36 | 12* | 9.00 | 0 | 25 | 3/23 | 28.88 | 0 | 7 | 0 | |
| David Wiese | South Africa | 2013–16 | 20 | 92 | 28 | 13.14 | 0 | 24 | 5/23 | 20.70 | 1 | 9 | 0 | |
| David Wiese | Namibia | 2021–24 | 34 | 532 | 66* | 28.00 | 3 | 35 | 4/17 | 22.91 | 1 | 11 | 0 | |
| Jade Dernbach | England | 2011–14 | 34 | 24 | 12 | 4.80 | 0 | 39 | 4/22 | 26.15 | 0 | 8 | 0 | |
| Jade Dernbach | Italy | 2021 | 6 | 7 | 5 | 7.00 | 0 | 5 | 1/17 | 30.00 | 0 | 2 | 0 | |
| Amjad Khan | England | 2009 | 1 | 2 | 2 | 2.00 | 0 | 2 | 2/34 | 17.00 | 0 | 0 | 0 | |
| Amjad Khan | Denmark | 2021–22 | 8 | 47 | 16 | 7.83 | 0 | 5 | 2/25 | 23.20 | 0 | 0 | 0 | |
| Rusty Theron | South Africa | 2010–12 | 9 | 32 | 31* | – | 0 | 12 | 4/27 | 21.75 | 1 | 2 | 0 | |
| Rusty Theron | United States | 2021–22 | 9 | 9 | 7* | – | 0 | 12 | 3/16 | 18.00 | 0 | 1 | 0 | |
| Michael Rippon | Netherlands | 2013–18 | 18 | 216 | 42 | 30.85 | 0 | 15 | 3/8 | 20.66 | 0 | 4 | 0 | |
| Michael Rippon | New Zealand | 2022 | 1 | 0 | 0 | – | 0 | 2 | 2/37 | 37.00 | 0 | 0 | 0 | |
| Daniel Jakiel | Zimbabwe | 2019 | 2 | – | – | – | – | 3 | 2/27 | 14.66 | 0 | 0 | 0 | |
| Daniel Jakiel | Malawi | 2022–26 | 48 | 231 | 38* | 12.83 | 0 | 58 | 5/11 | 20.03 | 1 | 12 | 0 | |
| Tim David | Singapore | 2019–20 | 14 | 558 | 92* | 46.50 | 4 | 5 | 1/18 | 51.00 | 0 | 12 | 0 | |
| Tim David | Australia | 2022–26 | 57 | 1,044 | 102* | 30.70 | 6 | – | – | – | – | 29 | 0 | |
| Connor Smith | Isle of Man | 2021 | 4 | 17 | 13 | 8.50 | 0 | 3 | 3/15 | 25.00 | 0 | 2 | 0 | |
| Connor Smith | Malaysia | 2023 | 2 | 10 | 9 | 5.00 | 0 | 1 | 1/15 | 15.00 | 0 | 1 | 0 | |
| Corey Anderson | New Zealand | 2012–18 | 31 | 485 | 94* | 24.25 | 2 | 14 | 2/17 | 35.35 | 0 | 19 | 0 | |
| Corey Anderson | United States | 2024 | 11 | 212 | 55 | 26.50 | 1 | 2 | 1/11 | 45.00 | 0 | 2 | 0 | |
| Nitish Kumar | Canada | 2012–19 | 18 | 434 | 83 | 31.00 | 3 | 7 | 2/18 | 22.85 | 0 | 5 | 0 | |
| Nitish Kumar | United States | 2024 | 18 | 277 | 64 | 19.78 | 1 | 1 | 1/13 | 24.00 | 0 | 10 | 0 | |
| David Ankrah | Ghana | 2019 | 4 | 22 | 12 | 7.33 | 0 | 2 | 1/21 | 42.50 | 0 | 0 | 0 | |
| David Ankrah | Nigeria | 2025 | 4 | 24 | 12 | 12.00 | 0 | 2 | 1/21 | 42.50 | 0 | 0 | 0 | |
| Karima Gore | United States | 2019–21 | 8 | 47 | 31 | 23.50 | 0 | 10 | 3/5 | 12.40 | 0 | 3 | 0 | |
| Karima Gore | West Indies | 2025 | 1 | – | – | – | – | – | – | – | – | 0 | 0 | |
| Ross Taylor | New Zealand | 2006–20 | 102 | 1,909 | 63 | 26.15 | 7 | – | – | – | – | 46 | 0 | |
| Ross Taylor | Samoa | 2025 | 4 | 45 | 22 | 22.50 | 0 | – | – | – | – | 3 | 0 | |
| JJ Smuts | South Africa | 2017–21 | 13 | 174 | 45 | 13.38 | 0 | 1 | 1/19 | 178.00 | 0 | 1 | 0 | |
| JJ Smuts | Italy | 2026 | 7 | 83 | 24 | 13.83 | 0 | 6 | 2/18 | 28.16 | 0 | 3 | 0 | |
| Tom Bruce | New Zealand | 2017–20 | 17 | 279 | 59* | 18.60 | 2 | – | – | – | – | 15 | 0 | |
| Tom Bruce | Scotland | 2026 | 4 | 65 | 35 | 16.25 | 0 | – | – | – | – | 2 | 0 | |
| Edmund Packard | Gibraltar | 2019–21 | 8 | 49 | 26 | 7.00 | 0 | 6 | 3/34 | 32.16 | 0 | 2 | 0 | |
| Edmund Packard | Luxembourg | 2026 | 4 | 44 | 27* | 44.00 | 0 | 5 | 2/26 | 24.60 | 0 | 0 | 0 | |
| Moises Henriques | Australia | 2009–21 | 24 | 355 | 62* | 20.88 | 2 | 7 | 3/22 | 27.71 | 0 | 6 | 0 | |
| Moises Henriques | Portugal | 2026 | 0 | 0 | 0 | 0 | 0 | 0 | 0 | 0 | 0 | 0 | 0 | |

=== Different formats ===
- Gavin Hamilton played one Test match for England in 1999, before playing 38 ODIs and 12 T20Is for Scotland.
- Ryan Campbell played two ODI matches for Australia in 2002, and also played three T20I matches for Hong Kong in 2016.
- Gregory Strydom played twelve ODIs for Zimbabwe in 2006 and six T20Is for Cayman Islands in 2019.
- Andri Berenger played ODIs for UAE and T20Is for Qatar. He also played for Sri Lanka at under-19 level.
- Joe Burns played 23 Tests and 6 ODIs for Australia between 2014 and 2020. He started playing T20Is for Italy from 2024.
- Ehsan Adil played 6 Tests and 3 ODIs for Pakistan between 2013 and 2015. He started playing T20Is for United States from 2026.
- Emilio Gay played three T20Is for Italy in 2025, and one Test for England in 2026.

== Women's cricket ==
=== One Day International cricket ===
Four women have played One Day International cricket for two teams. List updated to 21 January 2023 (ODI #1311).

| Name | Team | Career | Matches | Runs | HS | Avg | 100 | 50 | Wkt | BB | Avg | 4WI | Ct | St | Ref(s) |
| Name | Team | Career | Matches | Batting | | | | | Bowling | | | | Fielding | | Ref(s) |
|---|---|---|---|---|---|---|---|---|---|---|---|---|---|---|---|
| Nicola Payne | Netherlands | 1988–1998 | 37 | 631 | 73* | 18.02 | 0 | 2 | 19 | 3/20 | 20.26 | 0 | 16 | 0 | |
| Nicola Payne | New Zealand | 2000–2003 | 28 | 547 | 93 | 24.86 | 0 | 2 | 1 | 1/22 | 22.00 | 0 | 1 | 0 | |
| Rowan Milburn | Netherlands | 2000 | 7 | 148 | 71 | 21.14 | 0 | 1 | – | – | – | – | 1 | 5 | |
| Rowan Milburn | New Zealand | 2007 | 8 | 89 | 25 | 14.83 | 0 | 0 | – | – | – | – | 6 | 0 | |
| Bernadine Bezuidenhout | South Africa | 2014–2015 | 4 | 2 | 2 | 0.66 | 0 | 0 | – | – | – | – | 2 | 0 | |
| Bernadine Bezuidenhout | New Zealand | 2018–2020 | 9 | 123 | 43 | 20.50 | 0 | 0 | – | – | – | – | 5 | 1 | |
| Kim Garth | Ireland | 2010–2018 | 34 | 448 | 72* | 17.92 | 0 | 2 | 23 | 4/11 | 36.39 | 1 | 12 | 1 | |
| Kim Garth | Australia | 2023–present | 2 | 2 | 2 | 2.00 | 0 | 0 | 0 | – | – | 0 | 0 | 0 | |

=== Twenty20 International cricket ===
Seven women have played Twenty20 international cricket for two teams. List updated to 15 February 2026 (T20I #2672).

| Name | Team | Career | Matches | Runs | HS | Avg | 100 | 50 | Wkt | BB | Avg | 4WI | Ct | St | Ref(s) |
| Name | Team | Career | Matches | Batting | | | | | Bowling | | | | Fielding | | Ref(s) |
|---|---|---|---|---|---|---|---|---|---|---|---|---|---|---|---|
| Bernadine Bezuidenhout | South Africa | 2014–2015 | 7 | 68 | 34 | 13.60 | 0 | 0 | – | – | – | – | 1 | 0 | |
| Bernadine Bezuidenhout | New Zealand | 2018–2023 | 13 | 125 | 44 | 13.88 | 0 | 0 | – | – | – | – | 3 | 2 | |
| Chamani Seneviratne | Sri Lanka | 2010–2013 | 32 | 124 | 25 | 6.88 | 0 | 0 | 28 | 4/21 | 17.42 | 1 | 12 | 0 | |
| Chamani Seneviratne | United Arab Emirates | 2018–2022 | 23 | 369 | 63 | 19.42 | 0 | 2 | 28 | 5/3 | 10.07 | 2 | 5 | 0 | |
| Deepika Rasangika | Sri Lanka | 2009–2014 | 32 | 314 | 39 | 14.95 | 0 | 0 | 5 | 3/9 | 28.00 | 0 | 6 | 0 | |
| Deepika Rasangika | Bahrain | 2022-present | 34 | 1135 | 161* | 49.34 | 3 | 2 | 18 | 3/9 | 30.38 | 0 | 6 | 0 | |
| Kim Garth | Ireland | 2010–2019 | 51 | 762 | 51* | 23.09 | 0 | 1 | 42 | 3/6 | 19.88 | 0 | 18 | 0 | |
| Kim Garth | Australia | 2022–present | 10 | 2 | 2* | – | – | – | 7 | 2/24 | 42.14 | 0 | 0 | 0 | |
| Mahika Gaur | United Arab Emirates | 2019–2022 | 19 | 11 | 6* | 5.50 | 0 | 0 | 9 | 3/21 | 33.77 | 0 | 4 | 0 | |
| Mahika Gaur | England | 2023–present | 5 | 1 | 1 | 0.33 | 0 | 0 | 2 | 1/16 | 48.00 | 0 | 0 | 0 | |
| Gertrude Candiru | Uganda | 2018 | 5 | 69 | 43* | 23.00 | 0 | 0 | 4 | 2/11 | 18.75 | 0 | 1 | 0 | |
| Gertrude Candiru | Qatar | 2026–present | 13 | 252 | 62* | 22.90 | 0 | 2 | 14 | 4/15 | 19.14 | 1 | 2 | 0 | |
| Tshering Yangchen | Bhutan | 2019 | 3 | 1 | 1* | – | 0 | 0 | 0 | – | – | – | 0 | 0 | |
| Tshering Yangchen | Kuwait | 2025–present | 4 | 3 | 3 | 1.50 | 0 | 0 | 2 | 1/5 | 25.50 | 0 | 0 | 0 | |

=== Different formats ===
- Candacy Atkins played 1 Test & 11 ODIs for West Indies between 2003 and 2004 before playing 1 T20I for USA in 2019.
- Mahewish Khan played 2 Tests & 14 ODIs for Pakistan between 1998 and 2001 and 3 T20Is for Canada in 2019.
