= Aaron Jones (cricketer) =

American cricketer (born 1994)

Personal information
- Born: October 19, 1994 (age 32); Queens, New York City, United States
- Batting: Right-handed
- Bowling: Right-arm leg spin
- Role: Batsman

International information
- National side: United States
- ODI debut (cap 14): April 27, 2019 v PNG
- Last ODI: 18 February 2025 v Oman
- ODI shirt no.: 85
- T20I debut (cap 1): March 15, 2019 v UAE
- Last T20I: April 27, 2025 v Canada

Domestic team information
- Years: Team
- 2015/16–2016/17: Combined Campuses and Colleges
- 2017/18–2018/19: Barbados
- 2023: Rangpur Riders
- 2024-present: Seattle Orcas
- 2024: Saint Lucia Kings
- 2025: Sylhet Strikers

Career statistics
Competition	ODI	T20I	FC	LA
Matches	52	48	9	74
Runs scored	1,664	770	342	2,076
Batting average	33.95	24.06	20.11	30.52
100s/50s	1/11	0/2	0/1	2/12
Top score	123*	94*	52*	123*
Balls bowled	197	128	60	323
Wickets	0	8	2	3
Bowling average	–	18.37	29.00	97.00
5 wickets in innings	–	0	0	0
10 wickets in match	–	0	0	0
Best bowling	–	2/8	2/11	2/46
Catches/stumpings	17/–	11/–	3/–	23/–
- Source: ESPNcricinfo, August 9, 2025

Aaron Jones (born October 19, 1994) is an American cricketer who plays as batter for the United States national cricket team. He also plays for Barbados and Combined Campuses and Colleges in West Indian domestic cricket.

== Early life ==
Aaron Jones was born in the U.S. to Barbadian parents on October 19, 1994, in Queens, New York.

== International career ==
A right-handed top-order batsman and occasional leg spin bowler, Jones made his List A debut in January 2016, playing against the Leeward Islands in the 2015–16 Regional Super50. He made his first-class debut for Barbados in the 2017–18 Regional Four Day Competition on 26 October 2017.

In October 2018, he was named in the United States' squad for the 2018 ICC World Cricket League Division Three tournament in Oman. He was the leading run-scorer for the United States in the tournament, with 200 runs in five matches.

In February 2019, he was named in the United States' Twenty20 International (T20I) squad for their series against the United Arab Emirates. The matches were the first T20I fixtures to be played by the United States cricket team. He made his T20I debut for the United States against the United Arab Emirates on 15 March 2019.

In April 2019, he was named in the United States cricket team's squad for the 2019 ICC World Cricket League Division Two tournament in Namibia. He was named as one of the six players to watch during the tournament. In the United States' second match of the tournament, against hosts Namibia, Jones scored his first century in List A cricket, making 103 not out. The United States finished in the top four places in the tournament, therefore gaining One Day International (ODI) status. Jones made his ODI debut for the United States on 27 April 2019, against Papua New Guinea, in the tournament's third-place playoff.

In June 2019, he was named in a 30-man training squad for the United States cricket team, ahead of the Regional Finals of the 2018–19 ICC T20 World Cup Americas Qualifier tournament in Bermuda. The following month, he was one of five players to sign a 12-month central contract with USA Cricket. In August 2019, he was named in the United States' squad for the Regional Finals of the 2018–19 ICC T20 World Cup Americas Qualifier tournament.

In November 2019, he was named in the United States' squad for the 2019–20 Regional Super50 tournament. He was added to the New Jersey Somerset Cavaliers for the 2021 Minor League Cricket season.

== Franchise career ==
In June 2021, he was selected to take part in the Minor League Cricket tournament in the United States following the players' draft. In October 2021, he was named as the vice-captain of the American squad for the 2021 ICC Men's T20 World Cup Americas Qualifier tournament in Antigua.

In March 2023, he was signed by the Seattle Orcas as a part of their squad in the Major League Cricket Draft.

In January 2026, he was suspended from all formats of cricket by ICC after being charged with breaching anti-corruption rules.
