= Steven Taylor (American cricketer) =

American cricketer (born 1993)

Personal information
- Full name: Steven Ryan Taylor
- Born: November 9, 1993 (age 33); Hialeah, Florida, US
- Batting: Left-handed
- Bowling: Right-arm off break
- Role: Batsman, Wicket-keeper

International information
- National side: United States (2019–present)
- ODI debut (cap 23): April 27, 2019 v Papua New Guinea
- Last ODI: August 21, 2024 v Netherlands
- ODI shirt no.: 8
- T20I debut (cap 10): March 15, 2019 v UAE
- Last T20I: February 21, 2025 v Oman

Domestic team information
- Years: Team
- 2005–present: Fl Cricket Academy
- 2015–2016: Barbados Tridents
- 2017–2018: Jamaica
- 2017: Guyana Amazon Warriors
- 2018: Jamaica Tallawahs
- 2023-present: MI New York

Career statistics
Competition	ODI	T20I	FC	LA
Matches	49	32	3	86
Runs scored	1,265	822	39	2,199
Batting average	25.81	31.61	7.80	25.87
100s/50s	1/7	1/4	0/0	1/12
Top score	114	101*	20	114
Balls bowled	1,598	300	–	2,349
Wickets	40	12	–	56
Bowling average	30.02	24.83	–	31.05
5 wickets in innings	0	0	–	0
10 wickets in match	0	0	–	0
Best bowling	4/23	2/9	–	4/23
Catches/stumpings	20/–	11/–	6/–	35/1
- Source: Cricinfo, February 15, 2026

Steven Ryan Taylor (born November 9, 1993) is an American cricketer. He has played for the United States national cricket team since 2010 and previously captained the team. He is a left-handed top-order batsman and bowls right-arm off spin; early in his career he also played as a wicket-keeper. He has also played in West Indian domestic cricket including for several teams in the Caribbean Premier League (CPL).

== Career ==
=== Early years ===
He was born in South Florida to Jamaican parents, Loveth and Sylvan Taylor. Along with being a left-handed batsman who often opened the batting, he was also a wicketkeeper. He was taught at an early age on the sidelines of grounds around Florida by his father, Sylvan, and later by his mentor, former USA left-handed batsman Mark Johnson. Taylor later became the first 14-year-old to hit half centuries in the South Florida Cricket Alliance (SFCA) and the Keith Graham Memorial Classic (now the SFCA Sims Cup Classic). The innings, against Pakistan, was while he was representing a SFCA Youth Team, and included 4 fours and 3 sixes off 33 balls and lasted 41 minutes. He then scored 212, 206, and 51 off Big Broward Cricket Academy, the Atlanta-based Cricket Academy of USA, and the Michigan Cricket Academy. In the SFCA Sims Classic, he was left unbeaten on 87 against India, and 75 against Pakistan. He was the youngest player in the SFCA Premier Division.

=== U-19 career ===
Taylor was selected for the United States national under-19 cricket team at the 2010 ICC Under-19 Cricket World Cup in New Zealand. He played in the tournament as a wicketkeeper-batsman.

Taylor was selected as vice-captain for the ICC Americas Under-19 Championship held in their own ground at Florida, in the 2010–11 season. He was also the wicketkeeper-batsman on that tournament. USA won that tournament unbeaten, and Taylor too had a successful tournament finishing third on the top run-getters' list with 157 runs from 5 games with a top score of 83, and also topped the most dismissals' list with 7 dismissals (5 catches, 2 stumpings) from 5 games.

=== International career ===
Following his performances in the domestic and Under-19 arena, he was given the call-up to play in USA's 2010 ICC World Cricket League Division Four campaign, where they had gained promotion from Division Five. USA won the tournament, demolishing Italy in the final, with Taylor playing throughout the tournament.

In the 2011 ICC World Cricket League Division Three, however, USA could not replicate their past success, finishing 5th out of 6 teams. They were thus relegated back to Division Four.

In 2012 Taylor was selected as to be a part of the United States national cricket team at the 2012 ICC World Twenty20 Qualifier in the UAE in March 2012. Later in the same year he was selected for the 2012 ICC World Cricket League Division Four which takes place from September 3 to 10, 2012 in Malaysia.

Taylor became the first U.S. batsman to record a century in Twenty20 competition in the 2013 ICC World Cricket League Americas Region Twenty20 Division One tournament in March 2013. He scored 101 off 62 balls against Bermuda. He added a second century when he scored 127 not out against the Cayman Islands.

Later in the year, he represented the United States in the 2013 ICC World Cricket League Division Three, where he led all batters with 274 runs, for a run rate of 45.66. He scored a century in that tournament when he scored 162 in the opening match against Nepal.

Taylor was named in America's squad for the 2015 ICC World Twenty20 Qualifier, but withdrew after securing a contract with Barbados Tridents in the Caribbean Premier League. He is included in the draft of foreign players for final of Pakistan Super League 2017 at Gaddafi Stadium Lahore to bring back cricket back to Pakistan. In the draft for the 2017 Caribbean Premier League, he was picked in round 8 by the Guyana Amazon Warriors, securing a $30,000 contract.

On May 30, 2017, during the third-place playoff in the 2017 ICC World Cricket League Division Three tournament, Taylor scored his 1,000th run in one-day cricket, becoming the fourth player for the United States to reach the landmark.

In August 2018, he was named in the United States' squad for the 2018–19 ICC World Twenty20 Americas Qualifier tournament in Morrisville, North Carolina. In October 2018, he was named in the United States' squads for the 2018–19 Regional Super50 tournament in the West Indies and for the 2018 ICC World Cricket League Division Three tournament in Oman.

In February 2019, he was named in the United States' Twenty20 International (T20I) squad for their series against the United Arab Emirates. The matches were the first T20I fixtures to be played by the United States cricket team. He made his T20I debut for the United States against the United Arab Emirates on 15 March 2019.

In April 2019, he was named in the United States cricket team's squad for the 2019 ICC World Cricket League Division Two tournament in Namibia. The United States finished in the top four places in the tournament, therefore gaining One Day International (ODI) status. Taylor made his ODI debut for the United States on 27 April 2019, against Papua New Guinea, in the tournament's third-place playoff.

In June 2019, he was named in a 30-man training squad for the United States cricket team, ahead of the Regional Finals of the 2018–19 ICC T20 World Cup Americas Qualifier tournament in Bermuda. Later the same month, he was selected to play for the Montreal Tigers franchise team in the 2019 Global T20 Canada tournament. However, in July 2019, Taylor withdrew from the Global T20 Canada tournament, after signing a 12-month central contract with USA Cricket.

In August 2019, he was named as the vice-captain of the United States' squad for the Regional Finals of the 2018–19 ICC T20 World Cup Americas Qualifier tournament. He was the leading run-scorer for the United States in the tournament, with 144 runs in six matches. In November 2019, he was named as the vice-captain of the United States' squad for the 2019–20 Regional Super50 tournament.

In October 2021, he was named in the American squad for the 2021 ICC Men's T20 World Cup Americas Qualifier tournament in Antigua. In June 2022, Taylor scored his first century in an ODI match, with 114 runs against Nepal in round 13 of the 2019–2023 ICC Cricket World Cup League 2 competition.

=== Domestic career ===
Taylor made his first-class debut, playing for Jamaica, in the 2017–18 Regional Four Day Competition on November 9, 2017.

In June 2021, he was selected to take part in the Minor League Cricket tournament in the United States following the players' draft.

In March 2023, Taylor was roped into the MI New York squad for the inaugural edition of Major League Cricket in the player draft.

In October 2024, Taylor was picked by the Rangpur Riders in the players draft of Bangladesh Premier League.
