= 2021 Minor League Cricket season =

Twenty20 cricket tournament in America

- Dates: July 31 – October 3, 2021
- Administrator(s): USA Cricket; Major League Cricket
- Cricket format: Twenty20
- Tournament format(s): Round-robin and knockout
- Champions: Silicon Valley Strikers (1st title)
- Runners-up: New Jersey Stallions
- Participants: 27
- Matches: 225
- Player of the series: Hammad Azam
- Most runs: Unmukt Chand (SVS) (612)
- Most wickets: Damion Jacobs (EST) (32)
- Official website: milc.majorleaguecricket.com

The 2021 Minor League Cricket season (branded as the 2021 Toyota Minor League Cricket championship presented by Sling TV for sponsorship reasons and sometimes shortened to 2021 MiLC) was the inaugural season of Minor League Cricket, established by USA Cricket (USAC) and Major League Cricket (MLC) in 2019. The season was hosted over 27 venues across the United States, with matches broadcast through Willow and Sling TV. It was played from July 31 to October 3, 2021.

The tournament was won by the Silicon Valley Strikers, who defeated the New Jersey Stallions in the final played in Morrisville, North Carolina by 6 wickets, with Hammad Azam of the Golden State Grizzlies winning the award for Most Valuable Player of the series.

== Venues ==
- California
  - Morgan Hills Outdoor Complex
  - Santa Clara Cricket Field
  - Leo Magnus Cricket Complex (Van Nuys, Los Angeles)
  - Arroyo Park
  - Canyonside Park
- Washington – Tollgate Farm Park
- Texas
  - Moosa Stadium
  - McKinney Cricket Ground
  - Sandy Lake Cricket Ground
  - Prairie View Cricket Complex
  - ACAC Park
- Illinois
  - Washington Park (South Side, Chicago)
  - BPL Cricket Stadium
- Michigan – Lyon Oaks Cricket Ground
- Connecticut – Keney Park Cricket Field
- New York
  - Canarsie Park
  - Idlewild Park
- New Jersey – Howe Athletic Complex
- Pennsylvania – Exton Park
- Virginia – Veterans Memorial Park
- North Carolina – Church Street Park (Morrisville)
- Georgia
  - Atlanta Cricket Fields
  - Dalton Cricket Field
- Florida
  - Central Broward Stadium (Lauderhille)
  - Maq Cricket Stadium
  - Silverstar Recreation Center
* - Western Division (Pacific Conference)
- - Central Division (Pacific Conference)
- - Eastern Division (Atlantic Conference)
- - Southern Division (Atlantic Conference)

== Teams ==
=== Pacific Conference ===
Western Division

- Silicon Valley Strikers – Bay Peninsula
- Bay Blazers – East Bay
- Los Angeles
  - Hollywood Master Blasters
  - SoCal Lashings
- Golden State Grizzlies – Sacramento, California
- San Diego Surf Riders – San Diego
- Seattle Thunderbolts – Seattle

Central Division

- Austin Athletics – Austin, Texas
- Chicago
  - Chicago Blasters
  - Chicago Catchers
- Irving Mustangs – Dallas
- Houston Hurricanes – Houston
- Michigan Cricket Stars – Michigan
- St. Louis Americans – St. Louis

=== Atlantic Conference ===
Eastern Division

- New England Eagles – Boston
- NJ Somerset Cavaliers – Somerset
- New Jersey Stallions – Jersey City
- Empire State Titans – New York City
- Manhattan Yorkers – New York
- The Philadelphians – Philadelphia
- DC Hawks – Washington DC

Southern Division

- Atlanta
  - Atlanta Fire
  - Atlanta Param Veers
- Ft. Lauderdale Lions – Fort Lauderdale
- Florida Beamers – Miami
- Morrisville Cardinals – Morrisville, North Carolina
- Orlando Galaxy – Orlando

== Squads ==
Each team released their squad on June 10, 2021.

Atlanta Fire

- Aaron Jones
- Akhilesh Bodugum
- Amila Aponso
- Amrut Pore
- Ankit Hirani
- Ateendra Subramanian
- Corné Dry
- Hanchard Hamilton
- Jay Pathak
- Jaydeep Desai
- Ricardo Powell
- Ridwan Palash
- Rishi Bhardwaj
- Sagar Patel
- S Khan Safi
- Shamar Springer
- Steven Taylor
- Vasu Vegi

Atlanta Param Veers

- Ahsan Plummer
- Amit Sood
- Azeem Charania
- C Kumar Chava
- Chinmay Kushare
- Danush Kaveripakam
- Darpan Patel
- Dhruv Patel
- Evroy Dyer
- Heer Patel
- Jeavor Royal
- Jibran Gul
- Mark Parchment
- Neive McNally
- Param Patel
- Sahil Charania
- Santosh Reddy
- Zain Sayed

Florida Beamers'

- Akshar Patel
- Asim Khurshid
- Damian Rowe
- Faizan Maqsood
- Fuad Azadi
- Kevin Stoute
- L Daniel Raj
- Manav Patel
- Maq Qureshi
- Prahlad Madabhushi
- Pranavh Pradeep
- Prince Patel
- Prit Patel
- Rajesh Sharma
- Sai Ramesh
- Sarnam Patel
- Swaril Parikh
- Zishawn Qureshi

Ft. Lauderdale Lions

- Timothy Surujbally (c)
- Aadam Khan
- Akshay Patel
- Anirban Majumdar
- Antico Scott
- Ashok Gonuguntla
- Devendra Bishoo
- Elton Tucker Jr.
- Gavin Wallace
- Herlando Johnson
- Honey Gori
- Iain Beverely
- Kyle Phillip
- Kesrick Williams
- Pradeep Ravi
- Ricky Nayar
- Roy Silva
- Zachary Sattaur

Morrisville Cardinals

- Abhiram Bolisetty
- Aditya Gupta
- Aditya Padala
- Aryan Shah
- Conrad Lotz
- Jaskaran Malhotra (c)
- Karthikeya Jagadish
- Kiran Saravanakumar
- Kunal Sehgal
- Lahiru Milantha
- M Abdullah Shah
- Murali Ankaraju
- Rohan Phadke
- Ruvindu Gunasekera
- Ryan Wiggins
- Sanjay Stanley (vc)
- Siva Kumar
- Waqar Vicky

Orlando Galaxy

- Adam Khan
- Amahl Nathaniel
- A Abdullah Sheikh Jr.
- Babar Arshad
- B Gnanasakthi
- Christian Herrera
- Deep Patel
- Dunae Nathaniel
- Isuru Kiruwitage
- Kemar Jarett
- Marlon Bharath
- Matthew Comerie
- Meetul Patel
- Ramone Medwinter
- Rohit Dutchin
- Shabaka Mathlin
- Tagenarine Chanderpaul
- Timroy Allen

DC Hawks

- A Jabbar Mohammed
- Abdullah Ghazi
- Adil Bhatti
- Christopher van Tull
- Dane Piedt
- Franklin Clement
- Ishan Sharma
- Naseer Islam
- Rasesh Behera
- RI Singh Mehra
- Raviteja Reddy
- Ritwik Behera
- Sahil Kapoor
- Sarabjit Ladda
- Shehan Perera
- Sunny Sohal
- Tallal Zia
- Waleed Karimullah

Empire State Titans

- Akeem Dodson
- Bhaskar Yadram
- Christopher Barnwell
- Damion Jacobs
- Dimitri Adams
- Hemendra Ramdihal
- Jaladh Dua
- Javein Thomas
- Marvin Darlington
- Mohamed Shaw
- Navin Stewart
- Richard Ramdeen
- Taahaa Warraich
- Tabib Ahmed
- Tahmid Ahmed
- Trevon Griffith
- Trinson Carmichael
- Yogeshwer Singh

Manhattan Yorkers

- Alex Amsterdam
- Aman Patel
- Andre McCarthy
- Deveshwari Prashad
- Gajanand Singh
- Gauranshu Sharma
- Isiah Jagernauth
- Kevin Shah
- Manoj Acharya
- Poojan Mody
- Raj Bhavsar
- Raj Patel
- Savan Patel
- Shayne Moseley
- Smit Patel
- Surya Thurumella
- Ved Churiwala
- Vivek Ravichandran

New England Eagles

- Abdullah Syed
- Akshay Homraj
- Aryan Joshi
- Assad Fudadin
- Bruce Blackwood
- Chaitanya Parwal
- Derone Davis
- Emanuel Seecharran
- Fazal Alam
- Joshua Dhanai
- NN Reddy Mallepally
- Rajendra Chandrika
- R Rao Madhavaram
- Rizwan Mazhar
- Rohit Maryada
- Zeshan Muhammad

New Jersey Somerset Cavaliers

- Abhishek Prabhu
- Ahmed Labib
- Ali Imran
- Deep Joshi
- Imrul Hashib
- John Campbell
- Juanoy Drysdale
- Keifer Phill
- Muhammad Ghous
- Nkrumah Bonner
- Noman Iftikhar
- O'Neil Powell
- Rocy-Tohidul Islam
- Salik Iqbal
- Usman Ashraf
- Xavier Marshall
- Yasir Mohammad

New Jersey Stallions

- Anirudh Immanuel
- Daniel Williams
- Dominique Rikhi
- Hiren Patel
- Jasdeep Singh
- Jon-Ross Campbell
- Justin Dill
- Karan Patel
- Laxman Nyamagouda
- Preet Shah
- Raymond Ramrattan
- Ritvik Bansal
- Rovman Powell
- Sachin Mylavarapu
- Saiteja Mukkamalla
- Stephen Wiig
- Varun Mantha
- Viraj Desai

Philadelphians

- Abhayjit Khangura
- Aditya Sharma
- Chiranshu Bhatia
- Chris Patandin
- Derick Narine
- Dhruvil Dagli
- Hayat Khan
- Jeremy Gordon
- Jonathan Foo
- Kunal Baride
- Milind Kumar
- Muhammad Shah
- Pranav Rao
- Randall Wilson
- Rohan Arvindh
- Supreet Madan
- Yashwant Balaji

Austin Athletics

- Ahmed Butt
- Ali Bangash
- Awais Mubarak
- Derval Green
- Hamza Bangash
- Hamza Khalid
- Jagrit Raj
- Jahmar Hamilton
- Jannisar Khan
- Jay Desai
- Laksh Parikh
- Nitish Kumar
- Preyas Bhakta
- Rishab Patil
- Safiullah Faheem
- Shayan Jahangir
- Sidhesh Pathare
- William Perkins

Chicago Blasters

- Abul Hasan
- Akhil Pathan
- Anirudh Jonnavithula
- Ashhar Medhi
- Datta Prakash Y
- Donieke Perrin
- Fahad Babar
- Hasan Bemat
- Homayoon Ahmadzai
- Jedd Joseph
- Kamran Shaikh
- Mittansh Nithiyanandam
- Mohit Patel
- Moin Babar
- Najam Iqbal
- S Charith Daggupati
- S Reddy Baraji
- Shaheer Hassan

Chicago Catchers

- Abhyu Garg
- Akul Gupta
- Ankush Agarwal
- Asmar Najam
- Karan Kumar
- Kevin Phillip
- Pankaj Kampli
- Raid Ally
- Ranadeep Aleti
- Salman Ahmed
- Sandeep Sivaram
- Saquib Chowdary
- Shiraz Najam
- Shreyas Ramesh
- Sikander Soleja
- Sneh Patel
- Tejas Visal

Houston Hurricanes

- Ahsan Shah
- Ali Khan
- Ali Samad
- Ashley Nurse
- Derwish Ali
- Haris Qureshi
- Karthik Gattepalli
- Majjid Zubair
- Naseer Jamali
- Rishi Ramesh
- Saqlain Haider (vc)
- Shuja Naqvi
- Slade van Staden
- Sudhir Hinge
- Sushant Modani
- Usman Rafiq
- Waleed Ahmed
- Willem Ludick (c)

Irving Mustangs

- Abhiram Valisammagari
- Adnan Haroon
- Ajay Masand
- Ali Shiekh
- Burt Cockley
- Corey Anderson
- Damian Ebanks
- Junaid Nadir
- Mihir Cherukupali
- Muahammad Taha
- Najaf Shah
- Ninad Nimbalkar
- Petson Matthews
- Rehman Dar
- Rohan Manekar
- Saqib Hameed
- Soorya Selvakumar
- Umair Mir

Michigan Cricket Stars

- Anthony Wadsworth
- Arjun Ajbani
- Arjun Vajjala
- Farhan Ali
- Harish Yalamanchili
- Leniko Boucher
- Mahfuzur Rahman
- Matthew Forde
- Mufassir Ali
- Nicholas Kirton
- Nikhil Kanchan
- Ruhan Swar
- Ryan Scott
- Saad Bin Zafar
- Shaker Ahmed
- Tirth Patel
- Vraj Patel
- Zia Khan

St. Louis Americans

- C Sai Teja
- Dhruv Duggal
- Hemant Mandle
- Iknoor Singh
- Obus Pienaar
- Jeremiah Cruickshank
- Joshua Kind
- Kausthubh Sriperumbudoor
- Luke Schofield
- Munn Patel
- Murali Basupalli
- Paras Marwaha
- Sagar Thakkar
- Siddharth Saladi
- Siddhart Trivedi
- Surjit J Singh
- Unni GP
- Yashodhan Mahajan

Bay Blazers

- Arshdeep Brar
- David Bunn
- David White
- Josh Dascombe
- Kuldeep Singh
- Mario Rampersaud
- Nawaz Khan
- Nihal Desai
- Rohan Posanipally
- Ruchir Joshi
- Rusty Theron
- Shripal Modani
- S Rohit Sharma
- Sohan Bhat
- Srinivas Mohan
- Sujith Gowda

Golden State Grizzlies

- Abbas Jafri
- Abheyender Singh
- Aditya Srinivas
- Asad Khan
- Bhavesh Jain
- Hammad Azam
- Karan Chandel
- Junaid Malik
- Mohit Nataraj
- Neeraj Goel
- Saideep Ganesh
- Sami Aslam (c)
- Samson Bhatti
- Sheryar Khan
- Shivam Mishra
- Vatsal Vaghela
- Zia Shahzad

Hollywood Master Blasters

- Aaroh Rawat
- Ajay Immadi
- Anish Deshpande
- Arun Arjun
- Asad M
- Basanta Regmi
- Cody Chetty
- Dhyan Ranatunga
- Janak Patel
- Jignesh Patel
- Kanishka Chaugai
- Karan Viradiya
- Prithu Baskota
- Saikiran Valaboju
- Sakthi Karimanal
- Venukalyan Madireddy

San Diego Surf Riders

- Abhinay Reddy
- Adnesh Tondale
- Ayan Desai
- Brynley Richards
- Devam Shrivastava
- Dillon Heyliger
- Jaideep Reddy
- Marty Kain
- Mrunal Patel
- Mohammad Sadiq
- Ravi Timbawala
- Siddarth Matani
- Sri Krishna A
- Timil Patel
- Zubair Murad

Seattle Thunderbolts

- Abir Chippa
- Andries Gous (vc)
- Anirudh Srinivas
- Damodhar Bhat
- Deepak Rajendran
- Harmeet Singh (c)
- Jagroop Raina
- Karan Rao
- Manoj Panwar
- Manu Jacob
- Nital Vasavada
- Phani Simhadri
- P Kumar Mudi
- Rishab Mohan
- Sahil Kancherla
- Shadley van Schalkwyk
- Ujjawal Patel
- Varun Potlapally

Silicon Valley Strikers

- Abhishek Paradkar
- Anoop Krishnan
- Arsh Buch
- Dev Thadani
- Dilpreet Billing
- Gary Graham
- Kulvinder Singh
- Narsingh Deonarine
- Pranay Suri (vc)
- Rahul Jariwala
- Rohith Ramkumar
- Roshon Primus
- Rushil Ugarkar
- Saurabh Netravalkar
- Srinivas Raghavan
- Umang Parikh
- Unmukt Chand (c)

SoCal Lashings

- Akash Singh
- Abhijeet Singh
- Abhimanyu Rajp (c)
- Deepak Gosain
- Muditha Fernando
- Hammad Shahid
- Kakani Harish
- Harpreet Singh
- Iftikhar Ahmed
- Marcus Stewart
- Peter Vittachi
- R Singh Khosa
- Rayaan Bhagani
- Shamsher Singh
- Shiva Vashishat
- Sukhwant Sekhon
- Taha Jamal
- Vedant Jain

== Results ==
=== Atlantic Conference ===
Home \ Away	NEE	NJSC	NJS	EST	MY	TP	DCH	AF	APV	FLL	FB	MC	OG
Eagles	—	0–2	0–2	0–2	1–0	0–2	1–2	1–0	1–0	1–0	–	–	–
Cavaliers	2–0	—	0–2	0–1	0–2	1–1	1–1	0–1	1–0	1–0	1–0	–	–
Stallions	2–0	2–0	—	2–0	1–1	1–0	1–1	–	1–0	0–1	–	1–0	0–1
Titans	2–0	1–0	0–2	—	1–1	1–0	1–1	–	–	1–0	–	1–0	–
Yorkers	0–1	2–0	1–1	1–1	—	0–2	1–1	–	–	–	1–0	1–0	1–0
Philadelphians	2–0	1–1	0–1	0–1	2–0	—	1–1	1–0	–	–	1–0	1–0	–
Hawks	2–1	1–1	1–1	1–1	1–1	1–1	—	0–1	0–1	–	1–0	–	–
Fire	0–1	1–0	–	–	–	0–1	1–0	—	2–0	1–0	2–0	2–0	1–1
Param Veers	0–1	0–1	0–1	–	–	–	1–0	0–2	—	1–0	1–1	1–1	–
Lions	0–1	0–1	1–0	0–1	–	–	–	0–1	0–1	—	2–0	1–0	0–2
Beamers	–	0–1	–	–	0–1	0–1	0–1	0–2	1–1	0–2	—	0–2	–
Cardinals	–	–	0–1	0–1	0–1	0–1	–	0–2	1–1	0–1	2–0	—	2–0
Galaxy	–	–	1–0	–	0–1	–	–	1–1	–	2–0	–	0–2	—

Source: Minor League Cricket
Legend: Blue = home team win; Yellow = draw; Red = away team win.
For upcoming matches, an "a" indicates there is an article about the rivalry between the two participants.

=== Pacific Conference ===
Home \ Away	SVS	EBB	HMB	SCL	GSG	SDR	ST	AA	CB	CC	IM	HH	MCS	SLA
Strikers	—	2–0	1–1	1–1	2–0	2–0	1–1	–	1–0	1–0	–	–	–	–
Blazers	0–2	—	2–0	2–0	0–2	2–0	2–0	–	–	1–0	–	–	0–1	–
Master Blasters	1–1	0–2	—	1–1	0–2	0–2	0–2	0–1	–	–	0–1	0–1	–	–
Lashings	1–1	0–2	1–1	—	0–2	2–0	0–2	0–1	–	–	0–1	0–1	–	–
Grizzlies	0–2	2–0	2–0	2–0	—	2–0	2–0	–	1–0	–	–	–	–	1–0
Riders	0–2	0–2	2–0	0–2	0–2	—	1–1	0–1	–	–	1–0	0–1	–	–
Thunderbolts	1–1	0–2	2–0	2–0	0–2	1–1	—	–	–	–	–	–	0–1	1–0
Athletics	–	–	1–0	1–0	–	1–0	–	—	0–1	2–0	2–0	1–1	2–0	2–0
Chicago Blasters	0–1		–	–	0–1	–	–	1–0	—	2–0	0–2	0–2	0–2	1–1
Catchers	0–1	0–1	–	–	–	–	–	0–2	0–2	—	0–1	0–2	0–2	0–2
Mustangs	–	–	1–0	1–0	–	0–1	–	0–2	2–0	1–0	—	0–2	0–1	1–1
Hurricanes	–	–	1–0	1–0	–	1–0	–	1–1	2–0	2–0	2–0	—	1–1	1–1
Stars	–	1–0	–	–	–	–	1–0	0–2	2–0	2–0	2–1	1–1	—	2–0
Americans	–	–	–	–	0–1	–	0–1	0–2	1–1	2–0	1–1	1–1	0–2	—

Source: Minor League Cricket
Legend: Blue = home team win; Yellow = draw; Red = away team win.
For upcoming matches, an "a" indicates there is an article about the rivalry between the two participants.

== League stage ==
The league stage ran from July 31, 2021, to September 19, 2021. The schedule and the venues of the playoffs was released on 20 September 2021 by Major League Cricket.

The season had a total prize pool of $250,000, in which the winner took home $125,000.

=== Atlantic Conference ===
==== Southern Division ====
Pos	Team	Pld	W	L	NR	Pts	NRR
1	Atlanta Fire	14	10	3	1	21	1.457
2	Morrisville Cardinals	14	7	7	0	14	0.725
3	Orlando Galaxy	14	4	4	6	14	−2.449
4	Atlanta Param Veers	14	4	7	3	11	0.034
5	Ft. Lauderdale Lions	14	4	8	2	10	−0.358
6	Florida Beamers	14	1	11	2	4	−2.823

Source: Major League Cricket
- Top two teams advance to the Quarterfinals
- advances to Quarterfinals to play 2nd-place Eastern Division side
- advances to Quarterfinals to play 1st-place Eastern Division side
Division matches

31 July 2021
10:00 AM (EST)
Scorecard

Florida Beamers; 120/9 (20.0)	v	DC Hawks; 185/4 (20.0)
Monank Patel 29 (17); S Singh Ladda 3/10 (4.0)		RI Singh Mehra 80 (45); Swaril Parikh 2/27 (4.0)

DC Hawks won by 65 runs
Maq Cricket Stadium, Florida
Umpires: David Maitland and Ivor Henry
Player of the match: RI Singh Mehra

- DC Hawks won the toss and elected to bat
- Sunny Sohal, Adil Bhatti, RI Singh Mehra, Ritwik Behera, Franklin Clement, Dane Piedt, Raviteja Reddy, Rasesh Behera, Abdullah Ghazi, A Jabbar Mohammed, Sarabjit Ladda (DCH), Zishawn Qureshi, Akshar Patel, Monank Patel, Sarnam Patel, Suneel Kumar, RG Vignesh, L Daniel Raj, Rajesh Sharma, Prince Patel, Prit Patel, and Swaril Parikh (FB) all made their MiLC debuts.

31 July 2021
10:00 AM (EST)
Scorecard

Ft. Lauderdale Lions; 77/9	v	Empire State Titans; 160/5 (20.0)
Roy Silva 15 (15); Damion Jacobs 3/8 (4.0)		Trevon Griffith 85 (56); Ricky Nayar 2/24 (3.0)

Empire State Titans won by 83 runs
Broward County Stadium, Florida
Umpires: Max Diah and Mark Ebanks
Player of the match: Trevon Griffith

- Empire State Titans won the toss and elected to bat
- Timothy Surujbally, Ricky Nayar, Zachary Sattaur, Roy Silva, Iain Beverly, Kyle Phillip, Devendra Bishoo, Atul Iyer, Manas Parashar, Elton Tucker Jr., Akshay Patel (FLL), Trevon Griffith, Javein Thomas, Jaladh Dua, Bhaskar Yadram, Navin Stewart, Marvin Darlington, Trinson Carmichael, Akeem Dodson, Tahmid Ahmed, Damion Jacobs, and Taaha Warraich (EST) all made their MiLC debuts.

31 July 2021
10:00 AM (EST)
Scorecard

Morrisville Cardinals; 167/3 (18.0)	v	The Philadelphians; 166/5 (20.0)
Jaskaran Malhotra 79 (42); Jonathan Foo 1/11 (2.0)		Jonathan Carter 62* (39); Aditya Padala 1/18 (4.0)

Morrisville Cardinals won by 7 wickets (with 12 balls remaining)
Atlanta Cricket Fields, Georgia
Umpires: Conrad Rogers and Aditya Gajjar
Player of the match: Jaskaran Malhotra

- Morrsiville Cardinals won the toss and elected to bowl
- Jaskaran Malhotra, Ruvindu Gunasekera, Sanjay Stanley, Ryan Wiggins, Siva Kumar, Murali Ankaraju, Abhiram Bolisetty, Rohan Phadke, Aditya Padala, Kunal Sehgal, Karthikeya Jagadish (MC), Francis Mendonca, Derick Narine, Muhammad Shah, Jonathan Carter, Jonathan Foo, Chris Patandin, Dhruvil Dagli, Yashwant Balaji, Pranav Rao, Abhayjir Khangura, and Jeremy Gordon (EST) all made their MiLC debuts.

31 July 2021
2:00 PM (EST)
Scorecard

Atlanta Fire; 191/6 (19.0)	v	NJ Somerset Cavaliers; 187 (19.5)
Ricardo Powell 55 (27); Juanoy Drysdale 2/40 (4.0)		Kennar Lewis 59 (31); Corné Dry 4/22 (4.0)

Atlanta Fire won by 4 wickets (with 6 balls remaining)
Atlanta Cricket Fields, Georgia
Umpires: Rushane Samuels and Nur Uddin
Player of the match: Corné Dry

- NJ Somerset Cavaliers won the toss and elected to bat
- Steven Taylor, Sagar Patel, Rishi Bhardwaj, Aaron Jones, Hanchard Hamilton, Ricardo Powell, Corné Dry, Shamar Springer, Ridwan Palash, Akhilesh Bodugum, Ateendra Subramanian (ATF), Kennar Lewis, Yasir Mohammed, Xavier Marshall, Chandrapaul Hemraj, Sherfane Rutherford, Karima Gore, Ahmed Labib, Muhammad Ghous, Noman Iftikhar, Tohidul Islam, and Juanoy Drysdale (NJSC) all made their MiLC debuts.

31 July 2021
2:00 PM (EST)
Scorecard

Morrisville Cardinals; 171/8 (20.0)	v	New Jersey Stallions; 191/8 (20.0)
Kunal Sehgal 46 (31); Stephen Wiig 4/35 (4.0)		Jon-Ross Campbell 65 (39); Murali Ankaraju 3/19 (2.0)

New Jersey Stallions won by 20 runs
Atlanta Cricket Fields, Georgia
Umpires: Conrad Rogers and Aditya Gajjar
Player of the match: Jon-Ross Campbell

- New Jersey Stallions won the toss and elected to bat

31 July 2021
2:00 PM (EST)
Scorecard

Orlando Galaxy; 69/9 (20.0)	v	Manhattan Yorkers; 187/2 (20.0)
Shabaka Mathlin 14 (12); Manoj Acharya 2/5 (3.0)		Smit Patel 99* (60); Marlon Bharath 1/12 (2.0)

Manhattan Yorkers won by 118 runs
Broward County Stadium, Florida
Umpires: Delroy Lyn and Alwin Salmon
Player of the match: Smit Patel

- Manhattan Yorkers won the toss and elected to bat

1 August 2021
10:00 AM (EST)
Scorecard

The Philadelphians; 142/5 (20.0)	v	Atlanta Fire; 121 (17.2)
Jonathan Foo 41 (22); Ateendra Subramanian 2/25 (4.0)		Shamar Springer 34 (17); Derick Narine 3/33 (4.0)

The Philadelphians won by 21 runs
Atlanta Cricket Fields, Georgia
Umpires: Aditya Gajjar and Rushane Samuels
Player of the match: Jonathan Foo

- Atlanta Fire won the toss and elected to bowl

1 August 2021
10:00 AM (EST)
Scorecard

Ft. Lauderdale Lions; 148/5 (20.0)	v	New England Eagles; 149/2 (17.2)
Ricky Nayar 65 (52); Keon Joseph 2/24 (4.0)		Akshay Homraj 50* (37); Devendra Bishoo 1/13 (4.0)

New England Eagles won by 8 wickets (with 16 balls remaining)
Broward County Stadium, Florida
Umpires: Delroy Lyn and David Maitland
Player of the match: Ricky Nayar

- New England Eagles won the toss and elected to bowl

1 August 2021
10:00 AM (EST)
Scorecard

New Jersey Stallions; 170/6 (20.0)	v	Atlanta Param Veers; 87 (13.1)
Dominique Rikhi 41 (36); Evroy Dyer 2/20 (4.0)		Mark Deyal 27 (12); Steven Wiig 3/10 (2.0)

New Jersey Stallions won by 83 runs
Param Veers Cricket Field, Georgia
Umpires: Nur Uddin and Conrad Rogers
Player of the match: Stephen Wiig

- Atlanta Param Veers won the toss and elected to bowl

1 August 2021
10:00 AM (EST)
Scorecard

Manhattan Yorkers; 42/0 (7.0)	v	Florida Beamers; 101 (19.0)
Smit Patel 20* (16); Manav Patel 0/7 (2.0)		Monank Patel 49 (50); Manoj Acharya 3/9 (2.0)

Manhattan Yorkers won by 58 runs (D/L)
Maq Cricket Stadium, Florida
Umpires: Vincent Hartley and Max Diah
Player of the match: Manoj Acharya

- Manhattan Yorkers won the toss and elected to bat
- Play was reduced to 7 overs for the Manhattan Yorkers, revised target of 160

1 August 2021
2:00 PM (EST)
Scorecard

Orlando Galaxy; 108/8 (20.0)	v	Empire State Titans; 1/0 (0.3)
Asghar Sheikh Jr. 36 (31); Bhaskar Yadram 2/19 (4.0)		Trevon Griffith 0 (3); Rohit Dutchin 0/1 (0.3)

Play abandoned
Broward County Stadium, Florida
Umpires: Mark Ebanks and Delroy Lyn

- Orlando Galaxy won the toss and elected to bat

1 August 2021
2:00 PM (EST)
Scorecard

NJ Somerset Cavaliers; 252/5 (20.0)	v	Atlanta Param Veers; 128 (17.4)
Xavier Marshall 89 (50); Neive McNally 3/47 (4.0)		Mark Parchment 39 (30); Karima Gore 3/18 (3.4)

NJ Somerset Cavaliers won by 124 runs
Param Veers Cricket Field, Georgia
Umpires: Nur Uddin and Rushane Samuels
Player of the match: Xavier Marshall

- NJ Somerset Cavaliers won the toss and elected to bat

7 August 2021
10:00 AM (EST)
Scorecard

Orlando Galaxy	v	Florida Beamers; 3/2 (1.3)
		Lesie Daniel Raj 1* (1); Ramone Medwinter 1/2 (1.0)

Play abandoned
Silverstar Recreation Center, Florida
Umpires: Max Diah and David Maitland

- Florida Beamers won the toss and elected to bat

7 August 2021
6:00 PM (EST)
Scorecard

Morrisville Cardinals; 70 (17.0)	v	Atlanta Fire; 71/4 (11.1)
Ryan Wiggins 14 (24); Corné Dry 4/10 (3.0)		Aaron Jones 23* (24); S Kumar Duvvarapu 3/21 (4.0)

Atlanta Fire won by 6 wickets (with 53 balls remaining)
Church Street Park, North Carolina
Umpires: Tanak Jarapareddy and Vijaya Mallela
Player of the match: Corné Dry

- Atlanta Fire won the toss and elected to bowl

8 August 2021
10:00 AM (EST)
Scorecard

Florida Beamers; 18/4 (6.4)	v	Orlando Galaxy
Leslie Daniel Raj 4 (11); Rohit Dutchin 3/3 (3.0)

Play abandoned
Silverstar Recreation Center, Florida
Umpires: Alwin Salmon and Max Diah

- Orlando Galaxy won the toss and elected to bat

8 August 2021
11:00 AM (EST)
Scorecard

Morrisville Cardinals; 128/3 (18.3)	v	Atlanta Param Veers; 127/8 (20.0)
Kunal Sehgal 56 (37); Sahil Charania 2/28 (4.0)		Vinothkumar Kandaswamy 57 (54); S Kumar Duvvarapu 3/17 (4.0)

Morrisville Cardinals won by 7 wickets (with 9 balls remaining)
Church Street Park, North Carolina
Umpires: Alvin Burnett and Vijaya Mallela
Player of the match: Kunal Sehgal

- Morrisville Cardinals won the toss and elected to bowl

14 August 2021
10:00 AM (EST)
Scorecard

Atlanta Fire; 0/0 (0.0)	v	Ft. Lauderdale Lions; 0/0 (0.0)

Play abandoned
Broward County Stadium, Florida

- Atlanta Fire won the toss and elected to bat
- Match was washed out

14 August 2021
5:30 PM (EST)
Scorecard

Florida Beamers; 106/7 (18.0)	v	Morrisville Cardinals; 112/1 (11.1)
Kevin Stoute 40 (30); Jaskaran Malhotra 2/19 (4.0)		Jaskaran Malhotra 42* (21); Akash Joshi 1/25 (3.0)

Morrisville Cardinals won by 9 wickets (with 41 balls remaining)
Church Street Park, North Carolina
Umpires: Tarak Janapareddy and Vijaya Mallela
Player of the match: Jaskaran Malhotra

- Morrisville Cardinals won the toss and elected to bowl
- Play was reduced to 18 overs per side

15 August 2021
11:00 AM (EST)
Scorecard

Florida Beamers; 87/6 (20.0)	v	Morrisville Cardinals; 88/2 (9.1)
Sarnam Patel 31* (37); Karthikeya Jagadish 2/9 (4.0)		Jaskaran Malhotra 39 (18); Rishikesh Nuepane 1/9 (1.1)

Morrisville Cardinals won by 9 wickets (with 65 balls remaining)
Church Street Park, North Carolina
Umpires: Alvin Burnett and Vijaya Mallela
Player of the match: Karthikeya Jagadish

- Florida Beamers won the toss and elected to bat

15 August 2021
2:00 PM (EST)
Scorecard

Ft. Lauderdale Lions; 0/0 (0.0)	v	Atlanta Param Veers; 0/0 (0.0)

Play abandoned
Broward County Stadium, Florida

- Ft. Lauderdale Lions won the toss and elected to bat

21 August 2021
10:00 AM (EST)
Scorecard

Florida Beamers; 114/9 (20.0)	v	Atlanta Param Veers; 119/2 (13.4)
L Daniel Raj 42 (32); Sahil Charania 2/13 (4.0)		Amit Sood 45* (36); Manav Patel 1/10 (2.0)

Atlanta Param Veers won by 8 wickets (with 38 balls remaining)
Param Veers Cricket Field, Georgia
Umpires: Conrad Rogers and Nur Uddin
Player of the match: Vinothkumar Kandaswamy

- Atlanta Param Veers won the toss and elected to bowl

21 August 2021
10:00 AM (EST)
Scorecard

Atlanta Fire; 182/6 (20.0)	v	Orlando Galaxy; 96/8 (20.0)
Sagar Patel 60 (52); Kemar Jarrett 2/30 (4.0)		Meetul Patel 21 (13); Akhilesh Bodugum 2/13 (3.0)

Atlanta Fire won by 86 runs
Atlanta Cricket Fields, Georgia
Umpires: Aditya Gajjar and Jermaine Lindo
Player of the match: Hanchard Hamilton

- Orlando Galaxy won the toss and elected to bowl

21 August 2021
2:00 PM (EST)
Scorecard

Atlanta Fire; 45/0 (8.3)	v	Orlando Galaxy; 62/4 (7.2)
Sagar Patel 27* (28); Kemar Jarett 0/2 (2.0)		Dunae Nathaniel 21 (8); Amila Aponso 2/12 (2.0)

Orlando Galaxy won by 8 wickets (with 4 balls remaining, D/L)
Atlanta Cricket Fields, Georgia
Umpires: Jermaine Lindo and Rushane Samuels
Player of the match: Dunae Nathaniel

- Atlanta Fire won the toss and elected to bat
- Play reduced to 8 overs for Orlando Galaxy, revised target of 62

21 August 2021
2:00 PM (EST)
Scorecard

Ft. Lauderdale Lions; 110/6 (15.0)	v	Morrisville Cardinals; 83 (13.3)
Timothy Surujbally 35 (24); Aditya Gupta 2/21 (3.0)		Ryan Wiggins 32 (30); Honey Gori 3/5 (2.0)

Ft. Lauderdale Lions won by 27 runs
Church Street Park, North Carolina
Umpires: Alvin Burnett and Tarak Janapareddy
Player of the match: Honey Gori

- Morrisville Cardinals won the toss and elected to bowl
- Play reduced to 15 overs per side

22 August 2021
10:00 AM (EST)
Scorecard

Atlanta Param Veers; 247/1 (20.0)	v	Orlando Galaxy; 0/0 (0.0)
Zain Sayed 111* (50); Babar Arshad 1/39 (4.0)

Play abandoned
Param Veers Cricket Field, Georgia

- Atlanta Param Veers won the toss and elected to bat

22 August 2021
10:00 AM (EST)
Scorecard

Florida Beamers; 130/8 (20.0)	v	Atlanta Fire; 72/4 (10.4)
Armaan Kapoor 59 (56); Amila Aponso 3/17 (4.0)		Shamar Springer 17* (20); Prit Patel 3/19 (3.0)

Atlanta Fire won by 6 wickets (D/L)
Atlanta Cricket Fields, Georgia
Umpires: Rushane Samuels and Aditya Gajjar
Player of the match: Amila Aponso

- Atlanta Fire won the toss and elected to bowl
- Play reduced to 12 overs for Atlanta Fire, revised target of 68

22 August 2021
2:00 PM (EST)
Scorecard

Atlanta Param Veers; 106/2 (8.3)	v	Orlando Galaxy; 0/0 (0.0)
Zain Sayed 49* (22); Rohit Dutchin 1/28 (2.0)

Play abandoned
Param Veers Cricket Field, Georgia

- Atlanta Param Veers won the toss and elected to bat

28 August 2021
10:00 AM (EST)
Scorecard

Atlanta Fire; 200/4 (20.0)	v	Ft. Lauderdale Lions; 115 (18.4)
Aaron Jones 72* (43); Kyle Phillip 2/42 (4.0)		Kesrick Williams 45 (30); Shamar Springer 3/23 (3.4)

Atlanta Fire won by 85 runs
Broward County Stadium, Florida
Umpires: Delroy Lyn and David Maitland
Player of the match: Aaron Jones

- Atlanta Fire won the toss and elected to bat

28 August 2021
10:00 AM (EST)
Scorecard

Atlanta Param Veers; 124 (19.4)	v	Florida Beamers; 125/8 (19.5)
Mark Parchment 32 (27); Rajesh Sharma 3/23 (4.0)		Zishawn Qureshi 36 (31); Evroy Dyer 3/21 (3.5)

Florida Beamers won by 2 wickets (with 1 ball remaining)
Maq Cricket Stadium, Florida
Umpires: Mark Ebanks and Ivor Henry
Player of the match: Zishawn Qureshi

- Atlanta Param Veers won the toss and elected to bat

28 August 2021
2:00 PM (EST)
Scorecard

Orlando Galaxy; 98/6 (20.0)	v	Morrisville Cardinals; 104/1 (9.2)
Dunae Nathaniel 30* (25); Karthikeya Jagadish 2/12 (4.0)		Jaskaran Malhotra 90* (35); Bhaskar Gnanasakthi 1/36 (2.2)

Morrisville Cardinals won by 9 wickets (with 64 balls remaining)
Church Street Park, North Carolina
Umpires: Tarak Janapareddy and Vijaya Mallela
Player of the match: Jaskaran Malhotra

- Morrisville Cardinals won the toss and elected to bowl

29 August 2021
10:00 AM (EST)
Scorecard

Ft. Lauderdale Lions; 180/3 (20.0)	v	Atlanta Param Veers; 182/5 (19.5)
Timothy Surujbally 95 (57); Evroy Dyer 1/21 (4.0)		Zain Sayed 98* (57); Roy Silva 3/30 (4.0)

Atlanta Param Veers won by 5 wickets (with 1 ball remaining)
Broward County Stadium, Florida
Umpires: David Maitland and Delroy Lyn
Player of the match: Zain Sayed

- Ft. Lauderdale Lions won the toss and elected to bat

29 August 2021
10:00 AM (EST)
Scorecard

Orlando Galaxy; 110/7 (20.0)	v	Morrisville Cardinals; 113/4 (13.5)
Christian Herrera 33 (42); Siva Kumar 2/9 (3.0)		Kunal Sehgal 51* (38); Matthew Comerie 2/25 (3.5)

Morrisville Cardinals won by 6 wickets (with 37 balls remaining)
Church Street Park, North Carolina
Umpires: Alvin Burnett and Vijaya Mallela
Player of the match: Ruvindu Gunasekera

- Orlando Galaxy won the toss and elected to bat

29 August 2021
2:00 PM (EST)
Scorecard

Atlanta Fire; 148/8 (20.0)	v	Florida Beamers; 93/8 (20.0)
Ridwan Palash 34 (28); Rajesh Sharma 2/29 (4.0)		Asim Khurshid 27* (56); Amila Aponso 2/8 (4.0)

Atlanta Fire won by 55 runs
Maq Cricket Stadium, Florida
Umpires: Alwin Salmon and Mark Ebanks
Player of the match: Ridwan Palash

- Atlanta Fire won the toss and elected to bat

4 September 2021
10:00 AM (EST)
Scorecard

Ft. Lauderdale Lions; 158/4 (20.0)	v	NJ Somerset Cavaliers; 162/5 (19.5)
Roy Silva 52 (25); A Imran Pasha 2/16 (3.0)		Xavier Marshall 88* (55); Roy Silva 1/23 (2.5)

NJ Somerset Cavaliers won by 5 wickets (with 1 ball remaining)
Broward County Stadium, Florida
Umpires: Delroy Lyn and David Maitland
Player of the match: Xavier Marshall

- Ft. Lauderdale Lions won the toss and elected to bat

4 September 2021
10:00 AM (EST)
Scorecard

New Jersey Stallions; 99 (19.4)	v	Orlando Galaxy; 101/4 (18.2)
Raymond Ramrattan 28 (23); Tagenarine Chanderpaul 4/9 (4.0)		Tagenarine Chanderpaul 69* (46); Raymond Ramrattan 2/20 (4.0)

Orlando Galaxy won by 6 wickets (with 10 balls remaining)
Maq Cricket Stadium, Florida
Umpires: Ivor Henry and Alwin Salmon
Player of the match: Tagenarine Chanderpaul

- New Jersey Stallions won the toss and elected to bat

4 September 2021
10:00 AM (EST)
Scorecard

Empire State Titans; 145/5 (20.0)	v	Morrisville Cardinals; 110/9 (20.0)
Bhaskar Yadram 58* (30); Aditya Gupta 2/15 (4.0)		Ruvindu Gunasekera 52 (44); Damion Jacobs 3/20 (4.0)

Empire State Titans won by 35 runs
Church Street Park, North Carolina
Umpires: Alvin Burnett and Vijaya Mallela
Player of the match: Bhaskar Yadram

- Empire State Titans won the toss and elected to bat

4 September 2021
10:00 AM (EST)
Scorecard

DC Hawks; 132/5 (20.0)	v	Atlanta Fire; 136/3 (16.3)
RI Singh Mehra 44 (34); Shamar Springer 2/29 (4.0)		Shamar Springer 40* (19); Sarabjit Ladda 2/47 (3.5)

Atlanta Fire won by 7 wickets (with 21 balls remaining)
Atlanta Cricket Fields, Georgia
Umpires: Aditya Gajjar and Nur Uddin
Player of the match: Shamar Springer

- DC Hawks won the toss and elected to bat

4 September 2021
2:00 PM (EST)
Scorecard

Atlanta Param Veers; 185/7 (20.0)	v	New England Eagles; 189/3 (17.2)
Vinothkumar Kandaswamy 58 (33); Abdullah Syed 2/18 (4.0)		Akshay Homraj 58* (28); Vinothkumar Kandaswamy 1/17 (3.0)

New England Eagles won by 7 wickets (with 16 balls remaining)
Atlanta Cricket Fields, Georgia
Umpires: Rushane Samuels and Jermaine Lindo
Player of the match: Akshay Homraj

- New England Eagles won the toss and elected to bowl

4 September 2021
2:00 PM (EST)
Scorecard

The Philadelphians; 150/5 (20.0)	v	Florida Beamers; 146/8 (20.0)
Derick Narine 40 (31); Rajesh Sharma 2/24 (4.0)		Prince Patel 38 (28); Jonathan Foo 3/26 (4.0)

The Philadelphians won by 4 runs
Maq Cricket Stadium, Florida
Umpires: Alwin Salmon and Mark Ebanks
Player of the match: Jonathan Foo

- Florida Beamers won the toss and elected to bowl

4 September 2021
2:00 PM (EST)
Scorecard

Manhattan Yorkers; 139/5 (20.0)	v	Morrisville Cardinals; 138/7 (20.0)
Gauranshu Sharma 39 (35); Karthikeya Jagadish 2/25 (4.0)		Lahiru Milantha 44 (29); Raj Nannan 1/19 (4.0)

Manhattan Yorkers won by 1 run
Church Street Park, North Carolina
Umpires: Alvin Burnett and Vijaya Mallela
Player of the match: Raj Nannan

- Manhattan Yorkers won the toss and elected to bat

5 September 2021
10:00 AM (EST)
Scorecard

Ft. Lauderdale Lions; 130/7 (20.0)	v	New Jersey Stallions; 119 (19.5)
Roy Silva 63 (34); Raymond Ramrattan 2/19 (4.0)		Raghu Tirunahari 30 (23); Manas Parashar 4/13 (4.0)

Ft. Lauderdale Lions won by 11 runs
Broward County Stadium, Florida
Umpires: Ivor Henry and Mark Ebanks
Player of the match: Roy Silva

- Ft. Lauderdale Lions won the toss and elected to bat

5 September 2021
10:00 AM (EST)
Scorecard

Florida Beamers; 68 (17.5)	v	NJ Somerset Cavaliers; 71/1 (7.4)
Sarnam Patel 16 (30); Yasir Mohammad 3/16 (4.0)		Salik Iqbal 32* (20); Prit Patel 1/29 (3.0)

NJ Somerset Cavaliers won by 9 wickets (with 74 balls remaining)
Maq Cricket Stadium, Florida
Umpires: Delroy Lyn and David Maitland
Player of the match: Yasir Mohammad

- Florida Beamers won the toss and elected to bat

5 September 2021
2:00 PM (EST)
Scorecard

Atlanta Fire; 160/7 (20.0)	v	New England Eagles; 162/5 (18.4)
Jay Pathak 64 (34); Keon Joseph 2/19 (4.0)		Rizwan Mazhar 55 (29); Corné Dry 2/37 (4.0)

New England Eagles won by 5 wickets (with 8 balls remaining)
Atlanta Cricket Fields, Georgia
Umpires: Nur Uddin and Jermaine Lindo
Player of the match: Rizwan Mazhar

- Atlanta Fire won the toss and elected to bat

5 September 2021
2:00 PM (EST)
Scorecard

DC Hawks; 166/6 (20.0)	v	Atlanta Param Veers; 167/8 (18.5)
RI Singh Mehra 78 (51); Evroy Dyer 2/26 (4.0)		Zain Sayed 45 (22); Sarabjit Ladda 4/8 (4.0)

Atlanta Param Veers won by 2 wickets (with 7 balls remaining)
Atlanta Cricket Fields, Georgia
Umpires: Rushane Samuels and Conrad Rogers
Player of the match: Evroy Dyer

- DC Hawks won the toss and elected to bat

5 September 2021
2:00 PM (EST)
Scorecard

Orlando Galaxy; 132/2 (20.0)	v	The Philadelphians; 3/1 (1.3)
Tagenarine Chanderpaul 75* (65); Abhayjit Khangura 2/39 (4.0)		Chris Patandin 2* (4); Ramone Medwinter 1/1 (1.0)

Play abandoned
Maq Cricket Stadium, Florida

- Orlando Galaxy won the toss and elected to bat

11 September 2021
10:00 AM (EST)
Scorecard

Morrisville Cardinals; 142/9 (20.0)	v	Atlanta Fire; 145/6 (14.3)
Murali Ankaraju 29 (16); Corné Dry 3/24 (4.0)		Rishi Bhardwaj 48 (24); Aditya Gupta 4/27 (3.0)

Atlanta Fire won by 4 wickets (with 33 balls remaining)
Atlanta Cricket Fields, Georgia
Umpires: Aditya Gajjar and Jermaine Lindo
Player of the match: Rishi Bhardwaj

- Atlanta Fire won the toss and elected to bowl

11 September 2021
10:00 AM (EST)
Scorecard

Orlando Galaxy; 193/3 (20.0)	v	Ft. Lauderdale Lions; 187/6 (20.0)
Meetul Patel 93 (56); Roy Silva 2/49 (3.0)		Ashok Gonuguntla 58 (44); Rohit Dutchin 3/25 (4.0)

Orlando Galaxy won by 6 runs
Silverstar Recreation Center, Florida
Umpires: David Maitland and Mark Ebanks
Player of the match: Meetul Patel

- Ft. Lauderdale Lions won the toss and elected to bowl

11 September 2021
2:00 PM (EST)
Scorecard

Atlanta Param Veers; 150/7 (20.0)	v	Morrisville Cardinals; 142 (19.3)
Sahil Charania 49* (30); Aditya Gupta 2/14 (4.0)		Lahiru Milantha 52 (35); Heer Patel 4/16 (4.0)

Atlanta Param Veers won by 8 runs
Atlanta Cricket Fields, Georgia
Umpires: Jermaine Lindo and Rushane Samuels
Player of the match: Sahil Charania

- Morrisville Cardinals won the toss and elected to bowl

12 September 2021
10:00 AM (EST)
Scorecard

Ft. Lauderdale Lions; 121 (20.0)	v	Orlando Galaxy; 122/4 (19.0)
Kesrick Williams 48 (44); Ramone Medwinter 3/22 (3.0)		Rohit Dutchin 55 (38); Elton Tucker Jr. 2/14 (4.0)

Orlando Galaxy won by 6 wickets (with 6 balls remaining)
Silverstar Recreation Center, Florida
Umpires: David Maitland and Mark Ebanks
Player of the match: Rohit Dutchin

- Orlando Galaxy won the toss and elected to bowl

18 September 2021
10:00 AM (EST)
Scorecard

Ft. Lauderdale Lions; 179/6 (20.0)	v	Florida Beamers; 82 (19.5)
Anirban Majumdar 58 (39); Faizan Maqsood 3/24 (4.0)		Fuad Azadi 24 (26); Devendra Bishoo 3/4 (4.0)

Ft. Lauderdale Lions won by 97 runs
Maq Cricket Stadium, Florida
Umpires: David Maitland and Mark Ebanks
Player of the match: Devendra Bishoo

- Ft. Lauderdale Lions won the toss and elected to bat

18 September 2021
2:00 PM (EST)
Scorecard

Atlanta Param Veers; 142/8 (20.0)	v	Atlanta Fire; 144/8 (19.4)
Jeavor Royal 34 (26); Amila Aponso 3/15 (4.0)		Hanchard Hamilton 47 (35); Jeavor Royal 3/20 (4.0)

Atlanta Fire won by 2 wickets (with 2 balls remaining)
Atlanta Cricket Fields, Georgia (U.S. state)
Umpires: Nur Uddin and Jermaine Lindo
Player of the match: Amila Aponso

- Atlanta Param Veers won the toss and elected to bat

18 September 2021
2:00 PM (EST)
Scorecard

Florida Beamers; 105 (17.5)	v	Ft. Lauderdale Lions; 106/3 (11.1)
Faizan Maqsood 42 (24); Devendra Bishoo 3/20 (4.0)		Kesrick Williams 45 (31); Faizan Maqsood 2/14 (4.0)

Orlando Galaxy won by 6 wickets (with 6 balls remaining)
Maq Cricket Stadium, Florida
Umpires: Alwin Salmon and David Maitland
Player of the match: Kesrick Williams

- Ft. Lauderdale Lions won the toss and elected to bowl

19 September 2021
2:00 PM (EST)
Scorecard

Atlanta Param Veers; 167/5 (20.0)	v	Atlanta Fire; 168/6 (19.1)
Zain Sayed 44 (34); Amila Aponso 2/23 (4.0)		Rishi Bhardwaj 60 (42); Heer Patel 2/35 (4.0)

Atlanta Fire won by 4 wickets (with 5 balls remaining)
Atlanta Cricket Fields, Georgia
Umpires: Rushane Samuels and Conrad Rogers
Player of the match: Rishi Bhardwaj

- Atlanta Param Veers won the toss and elected to bat

==== Eastern Division ====
Pos	Team	Pld	W	L	NR	Pts	NRR
1	New Jersey Stallions	16	11	4	1	23	0.647
2	Empire State Titans	16	9	4	3	21	0.041
3	The Philadelphians	16	8	5	3	19	0.008
4	DC Hawks	16	8	8	0	16	0.206
5	Manhattan Yorkers	16	8	7	1	17	0.040
6	NJ Somerset Cavaliers	16	7	8	1	15	1.108
7	New England Eagles	16	5	10	1	11	−1.148

Source: Major League Cricket
- Top two teams advance to the Quarterfinals
- advances to Quarterfinals to play 2nd-place Southern Division side
- advances to Quarterfinals to play 1st-place Southern Division side
Division matches

31 July 2021
2:00 PM (EST)
Scorecard

DC Hawks; 113/9 (20.0)	v	New England Eagles; 146/7 (20.0)
Adil Bhatti 30 (28); Bruce Blackwood 3/17 (3.0)		Akshay Homraj 25 (15); S Singh Ladda 5/22 (4.0)

New England Eagles won by 33 runs
Maq Cricket Stadium, Florida
Umpires: Vincent Hartley and Ivor Henry
Player of the match: Bruce Blackwood

- New England Eagles won the toss and elected to bat

7 August 2021
10:00 AM (EST)
Scorecard

New Jersey Stallions; 115/5 (20.0)	v	Empire State Titans; 88/8 (20.0)
Hiren Patel 48 (44); Trinson Carmichael 1/10 (3.0)		Navin Stewart 24 (22); Stephen Wiig 3/23 (4.0)

New Jersey Stallions won by 27 runs
Howe Athletic Complex, New Jersey
Umpires: Colin Edwards and Mihir Patel
Player of the match: Hiren Patel

- Empire State Titans won the toss and elected to bowl

7 August 2021
10:00 AM (EST)
Scorecard

The Philadelphians; 146/6 (20.0)	v	DC Hawks; 147/5 (17.0)
Chris Patandin 66 (47); Waleed Karimullah 2/27 (3.0)		Sunny Sohal 40 (34); Pranav Rao 2/37 (4.0)

DC Hawks won by 5 wickets (with 18 balls remaining)
Exton Park, Pennsylvania
Umpires: Anil Pap and Bruce Gottschalk
Player of the match: Sunny Sohal

- The Philadelphians won the toss and elected to bat

7 August 2021
2:00 PM (EST)
Scorecard

New England Eagles; 136/7 (20.0)	v	New Jersey Stallions; 141/2 (18.3)
Davis Derone 38* (27); Jasdeep Singh 2/8 (4.0)		Daniel Williams 36 (37); Chaitanya Parwal 2/21 (3.0)

New Jersey Stallions won by 8 wickets (with 9 balls remaining)
Howe Athletic Complex, New Jersey
Umpires: Colin Edwards and Ritesh Patel
Player of the match: Dominique Rikhi

- New England Eagles won the toss and elected to bat

8 August 2021
10:00 AM (EST)
Scorecard

NJ Somerset Cavaliers; 204/6 (20.0)	v	DC Hawks; 89/9 (20.0)
Sherfane Rutherford 79 (43); RI Singh Mehra 3/14 (2.0)		RI Singh Mehra 31 (33); Muhammad Ghous 3/17 (3.3)

NJ Somerset Cavaliers won by 115 runs
Exton Park, Pennsylvania
Umpires: Aveek Gangopadhyay and Mihir Patel
Player of the match: Sherfane Rutherford

- NJ Somerset Cavaliers won the toss and elected to bat

8 August 2021
2:00 PM (EST)
Scorecard

NJ Somerset Cavaliers; 153/8 (20.0)	v	The Philadelphians; 156/4 (18.0)
Deep Joshi 40* (24); Jonathan Foo 2/22 (3.0)		Chris Patandin 74 (52); Sherfane Rutherford 2/40 (4.0)

The Philadelphians won by 6 wickets (with 12 balls remaining)
Exton Park, Pennsylvania
Umpires: Aveek Gangopadhyay and Harshvardhan Uppaluru
Player of the match: Chris Patandin

- The Philadelphians won the toss and elected to bowl

8 August 2021
2:00 PM (EST)
Scorecard

Manhattan Yorkers; 113/8 (20.0)	v	New Jersey Stallions; 107 (19.5)
Deveshwari Prashad 27 (21); Jasdeep Singh 3/21 (4.0)		Justin Dill 33 (43); Manoj Acharya 5/18 (4.0)

Manhattan Yorkers won by 6 runs
Mercer County Park, New Jersey
Umpires: Danny Khan and Garfield Hodge
Player of the match: Manoj Acharya

- New Jersey Stallions won the toss and elected to bowl

14 August 2021
10:00 AM (EST)
Scorecard

New England Eagles; 155/9 (20.0)	v	NJ Somerset Cavaliers; 156/5 (18.0)
Rajendra Chandrika 38 (32); Yasir Mohammad 4/30 (4.0)		John Campbell 49 (21); Keon Joseph 2/25 (4.0)

NJ Somerset Cavaliers won by 5 wickets (with 12 balls remaining)
Exton Park, Pennsylvania
Umpires: Mihir Patel and Colin Edwards
Player of the match: Yasir Mohammad

- NJ Somerset Cavaliers won the toss and elected to bowl

14 August 2021
10:00 AM (EST)
Scorecard

DC Hawks; 126/5 (17.0)	v	New Jersey Stallions; 116/9 (17.0)
RI Singh Mehra 44* (23); Dominique Rikhi 1/8 (2.0)		Zeniffe Fowler 38 (24); Naseer Islam 3/15 (4.0)

DC Hawks won by 10 runs
Veterans Memorial Park, Virginia
Umpires: Anil Pap and Aveek Gangopadhyay
Player of the match: Waleed Karimullah

- DC Hawks won the toss and elected to bat
- Play reduced to 17 overs per side

14 August 2021
2:00 PM (EST)
Scorecard

The Philadelphians; 213/5 (20.0)	v	New England Eagles; 190/8 (20.0)
Francis Mendonca 77 (55); Dino Chooweenam 4/38 (4.0)		Rajendra Chandrika 64 (47); Jeremy Gordon 2/29 (4.0)

The Philadelphians won by 23 runs
Exton Park, Pennsylvania
Umpires: Colin Edwards and Dimapal Patel
Player of the match: Derick Narine

- New England Eagles won the toss and elected to bowl

14 August 2021
2:00 PM (EST)
Scorecard

DC Hawks; 97 (18.4)	v	New Jersey Stallions; 98/5 (15.2)
Franklin Clement 27 (23); Jasdeep Singh 4/13 (3.4)		Hiren Patel 39* (33); Naseer Islam 2/15 (4.0)

New Jersey Stallions won by 5 wickets (with 28 balls remaining)
Veterans Memorial Park, Virginia
Umpires: Anil Pap and Harshvardhan Uppaluru
Player of the match: Jasdeep Singh

- DC Hawks won the toss and elected to bat

15 August 2021
10:00 AM (EST)
Scorecard

DC Hawks; 200/6 (20.0)	v	New England Eagles; 91/7 (20.0)
Sunny Sohal 94 (51); Assad Fudadin 2/38 (4.0)		Bruce Blackwood 28 (23); Gourav Bajaj 2/25 (4.0)

DC Hawks won by 109 runs
Exton Park, Pennsylvania
Umpires: Anil Pap and Colin Edwards
Player of the match: Sunny Sohal

- New England Eagles won the toss and elected to bowl

15 August 2021
10:00 AM (EST)
Scorecard

NJ Somerset Cavaliers; 143/5 (20.0)	v	Manhattan Yorkers; 144/4 (18.1)
Xavier Marshall 69 (46); Raj Patel 3/20 (4.0)		Gauranshu Sharma 52 (34); John Campbell 4/22 (4.0)

Manhattan Yorkers won by 6 wickets (with 11 balls remaining)
Howe Athletic Complex, New Jersey
Umpires: Dimapal Patel and Mihir Patel
Player of the match: Gauranshu Sharma

- Manhattan Yorkers won the toss and elected to bowl

15 August 2021
2:00 PM (EST)
Scorecard

Empire State Titans; 189/9 (20.0)	v	The Philadelphians; 163/9 (20.0)
Trevon Griffith 85 (48); Javon Searles 3/20 (4.0)		Jonathan Foo 90 (45); Christopher Barnwell 3/15 (2.0)

Empire State Titans won by 26 runs
Exton Park, Pennsylvania
Umpires: Colin Edwards and Aveek Gangopadhyay
Player of the match: Trevon Griffith

- Empire State Titans won the toss and elected to bat

21 August 2021
10:00 AM (EST)
Scorecard

New Jersey Stallions; 137/7 (20.0)	v	Empire State Titans; 135/6 (20.0)
Aaditya Varadarajan 39 (41); Navin Stewart 2/31 (4.0)		Jaladh Dua 35 (37); Stephen Wiig 3/36 (4.0)

New Jersey Stallions won by 2 runs
Howe Athletic Complex, New Jersey
Umpires: Colin Edwards and Mihir Patel
Player of the match: Raymond Ramrattan

- New Jersey Stallions won the toss and elected to bat

21 August 2021
2:00 PM (EST)
Scorecard

Manhattan Yorkers; 118/8 (20.0)	v	The Philadelphians; 119/3 (17.1)
Raj Bhavsar 38 (37); Milind Kumar 2/18 (4.0)		Milind Kumar 47* (35); Andre McCarthy 2/19 (3.1)

The Philadelphians won by 7 wickets (with 17 balls remaining)
Mercer County Park, New Jersey
Umpires: Bryan Caine and Dimapal Patel
Player of the match: Milind Kumar

- The Philadelphians won the toss and elected to bowl

21 August 2021
2:00 PM (EST)
Scorecard

New Jersey Stallions; 176/4 (20.0)	v	NJ Somerset Cavaliers; 132 (18.0)
Saiteja Mukkamalla 68 (44); Umair Ali 2/43 (4.0)		John Campbell 42 (29); Aaditya Varadarajan 2/13 (3.0)

New Jersey Stallions won by 44 runs
Howe Athletic Complex, New Jersey
Umpires: Colin Edwards and Bruce Gottschalk
Player of the match: Saiteja Mukkamalla

- New Jersey Stallions won the toss and elected to bat

22 August 2021
10:00 AM (EST)
Scorecard

Empire State Titans; 0/0 (0.0)	v	The Philadelphians; 0/0 (0.0)

Play abandoned
Idlewild Park, New York
Umpires: Danny Khan and Roan McFarlane

- Match was washed out

22 August 2021
2:00 PM (EST)
Scorecard

Empire State Titans; 0/0 (0.0)	v	NJ Somerset Cavaliers; 0/0 (0.0)

Play abandoned
Idlewild Park, New York
Umpires: Danny Khan and Roan McFarlane

- Match was washed out

22 August 2021
2:00 PM (EST)
Scorecard

Manhattan Yorkers; 119/7 (20.0)	v	DC Hawks; 41/0 (6.2)
Gauranshu Sharma 41 (34); Neil Narvekar 2/13 (4.0)		Naseer Islam 19 (15); Raj Nannan 1/2 (1.0)

DC Hawks won by 8 wickets (D/L)
Veterans Memorial Park, Virginia
Umpires: Anil Pap and Aveek Gangopadhyay
Player of the match: Neil Narvekar

- DC Hawks won the toss and elected to bowl.
- Play was reduced to 7 overs for the DC Hawks, revised target of 40

28 August 2021
10:00 AM (EST)
Scorecard

NJ Somerset Cavaliers; 135/5 (20.0)	v	Manhattan Yorkers; 136/5 (19.5)
Xavier Marshall 39 (39); Raj Patel 3/31 (4.0)		Andre McCarthy 65 (42); Juanoy Drysdale 2/25 (3.5)

Manhattan Yorkers won by 5 wickets (with 1 ball remaining)
Mercer County Park, New Jersey
Umpires: Garfield Hodge and Roan McFarlane
Player of the match: Andre McCarthy

- Manhattan Yorkers won the toss and elected to bowl

28 August 2021
2:00 PM (EST)
Scorecard

NJ Somerset Cavaliers; 175/9 (20.0)	v	New England Eagles; 89 (18.3)
Xavier Marshall 105 (50); Bruce Blackwood 4/35 (4.0)		Zeshan Muhammad 26 (21); Juanoy Drysdale 3/13 (4.0)

NJ Somerset Cavaliers won by 86 runs
Mercer County Park, New Jersey
Umpires: Garfield Hodge and Roan McFarlane
Player of the match: Xavier Marshall

- NJ Somerset Cavaliers won the toss and elected to bat
- Xavier Marshall (NJSC) made his first MiLC hundred

28 August 2021
2:00 PM (EST)
Scorecard

Empire State Titans; 75 (17.2)	v	DC Hawks; 76/8 (19.5)
Marvin Darlington 25 (18); Naseer Islam 2/9 (3.2)		Ishan Sharma 31 (43); Christopher Barnwell 3/10 (3.5)

DC Hawks won by 2 wickets (with 1 ball remaining)
Veterans Memorial Park, Virginia
Umpires: Aveek Gangopadhyay and Eshan Mulay
Player of the match: Neil Narvekar

- DC Hawks won the toss and elected to bowl

29 August 2021
10:00 AM (EST)
Scorecard

Empire State Titans; 182/3 (20.0)	v	DC Hawks; 108 (16.2)
Trevon Griffith 87* (57); Neil Narvekar 1/17 (3.0)		RI Singh Mehra 52 (49); Christopher Barnwell 3/8 (3.0)

Empire State Titans won by 74 runs
Veterans Memorial Park, Virginia
Umpires: Anil Pap and Eshan Mulay
Player of the match: Trevon Griffith

- DC Hawks won the toss and elected to bowl

29 August 2021
2:00 PM (EST)
Scorecard

Manhattan Yorkers; 154/4 (20.0)	v	The Philadelphians; 157/2 (19.5)
Raj Bhavsar 50 (50); Chiranshu Bhatia 2/32 (4.0)		Chris Patandin 61* (66); Deveshwari Prashad 1/24 (4.0)

The Philadelphians won by 8 wickets (with 1 ball remaining)
Mercer County Park, New Jersey
Umpires: Colin Edwards and Mihir Patel
Player of the match: Jonathan Foo

- The Philadelphians won the toss and elected to bowl

29 August 2021
2:00 PM (EST)
Scorecard

NJ Somerset Cavaliers; 115/9 (19.4)	v	New Jersey Stallions; 117/4 (17.4)
John Campbell 64 (40); Justin Dill 4/26 (3.4)		Saiteja Mukkamalla 44* (50); Juanoy Drysdale 2/26 (4.0)

New Jersey Stallions won by 6 wickets (with 14 balls remaining)
Howe Athletic Complex, New Jersey
Umpires: Bryan Caine and Ivy Mahabir
Player of the match: Justin Dill

- NJ Somerset Cavaliers won the toss and elected to bat

5 September 2021
10:00 AM (EST)
Scorecard

DC Hawks; 160/7 (20.0)	v	New England Eagles; 151 (19.1)
Christopher van Tull 53 (30); Derone Davis 3/17 (4.0)		Abdullah Syed 45 (20); RI Singh Mehra 3/3 (1.1)

DC Hawks won by 9 runs
Atlanta Cricket Fields, Georgia
Umpires: Jermaine Lindo and Nur Uddin
Player of the match: Dane Piedt

- New England Eagles won the toss and elected to bowl

5 September 2021
2:00 PM (EST)
Scorecard

Empire State Titans; 186/4 (20.0)	v	Manhattan Yorkers; 73/9 (13.5)
Christopher Barnwell 114* (69); Manoj Acharya 2/50 (4.0)		Raj Nannan 19 (18); Damion Jacobs 5/16 (2.5)

Empire State Titans won by 113 runs
Church Street Park, North Carolina
Umpires: Rahul Patwardhan and Vijaya Mallela
Player of the match: Christopher Barnwell

- Empire State Titans won the toss and elected to bat
- Christopher Barnwell (EST) made his first MiLC hundred

11 September 2021
10:00 AM (EST)
Scorecard

Empire State Titans; 224/2 (20.0)	v	New England Eagles; 51 (17.5)
Trevon Griffith 71 (40); Abdullah Syed 1/22 (4.0)		Assad Fudadin 21 (41); Trevon Griffith 4/9 (4.0)

Empire State Titans won by 173 runs
Idlewild Park, New York
Umpires: Danny Khan and Bryan Caine
Player of the match: Trevon Griffith

- New England Eagles won the toss and elected to bowl

11 September 2021
10:00 AM (EST)
Scorecard

The Philadelphians; 155/5 (20.0)	v	NJ Somerset Cavaliers; 156/5 (19.1)
Milind Kumar 33 (27); Imrul Hashib 2/24 (4.0)		John Campbell 41* (24); Aditya Sharma 3/16 (3.0)

NJ Somerset Cavaliers won by 5 wickets (with 5 balls remaining)
Howe Athletic Complex, New Jersey
Umpires: Colin Edwards and Bruce Gottschalk
Player of the match: John Campbell

- NJ Somerset Cavaliers won the toss and elected to bowl

11 September 2021
2:00 PM (EST)
Scorecard

DC Hawks; 157/7 (20.0)	v	The Philadelphians; 158/7 (19.5)
Adil Bhatti 58 (36); Milind Kumar 2/18 (3.0)		Jonathan Foo 86* (45); Adil Bhatti 3/23 (4.0)

The Philadelphians won by 3 wickets (with 1 ball remaining)
Howe Athletic Complex, New Jersey
Umpires: Colin Edwards and Mihir Patel
Player of the match: Jonathan Foo

- DC Hawks won the toss and elected to bat

12 September 2021
10:00 AM (EST)
Scorecard

DC Hawks; 161/7 (20.0)	v	NJ Somerset Cavaliers; 99 (17.0)
RI Singh Mehra 68 (58); Ali Imran 4/14 (4.0)		Nkrumah Bonner 23 (27); Sarabjit Ladda 4/16 (4.0)

DC Hawks won by 62 runs
Howe Athletic Complex, New Jersey
Umpires: Colin Edwards and Ivy Mahabir
Player of the match: RI Singh Mehra

- NJ Somerset Cavaliers won the toss and elected to bowl

12 September 2021
10:00 AM (EST)
Scorecard

Manhattan Yorkers; 139/6 (20.0)	v	New England Eagles; 140/6 (20.0)
Shayne Moseley 46 (42); Abdullah Syed 2/22 (4.0)		Assad Fudadin 43 (41); Raj Nannan 2/19 (4.0)

New England Eagles won by 4 wickets
Keney Park Cricket Field, Connecticut
Umpires: Mangesh Rane and Danny Khan
Player of the match: Rizwan Mazhar

- New England Eagles won the toss and elected to bowl

12 September 2021
2:00 PM (EST)
Scorecard

New Jersey Stallions; 104/8 (20.0)	v	New England Eagles; 91 (19.3)
Justin Dill 27* (29); Aryan Joshi 3/14 (4.0)		Abdullah Syed 43 (25); Karan Patel 3/9 (4.0)

New Jersey Stallions won by 13 runs
Keney Park Cricket Field, Connecticut
Umpires: Danny Khan and Mangesh Rane
Player of the match: Karan Patel

- New Jersey Stallions won the toss and elected to bat

12 September 2021
2:00 PM (EST)
Scorecard

Empire State Titans; 142/9 (20.0)	v	NJ Somerset Cavaliers; 112/4 (20.0)
Bhaskar Yadram 33* (28); Noman Iftikhar 3/20 (4.0)		O'Neil Powell 38* (49); Navin Stewart 2/20 (4.0)

Empire State Titans won by 30 runs
Howe Athletic Complex, New Jersey
Umpires: Colin Edwards and Ritesh Patel
Player of the match: Navin Stewart

- Empire State Titans won the toss and elected to bat

18 September 2021
10:00 AM (EST)
Scorecard

DC Hawks; 140/5 (20.0)	v	Manhattan Yorkers; 141/3 (18.4)
RI Singh Mehra 45 (36); Raj Bhavsar 2/24 (4.0)		Raj Bhavsar 68* (49); Adil Bhatti 1/13 (3.0)

Manhattan Yorkers won by 7 wickets (with 8 balls remaining)
Mercer County Park, New Jersey
Umpires: Garfield Hodge and Roan McFarlane
Player of the match: Raj Bhavsar

- DC Hawks won the toss and elected to bat

18 September 2021
10:00 AM (EST)
Scorecard

Empire State Titans; 165/7 (18.0)	v	New England Eagles; 125/7 (18.0)
Christopher Barnwell 37 (17); R Rao Madhavaram 4/40 (4.0)		Rizwan Mazhar 51 (34); Damion Jacobs 3/23 (4.0)

Empire State Titans won by 40 runs
Franklin Field, Pennsylvania
Umpires: Mangesh Rane and Saravanakumar Venkatesan
Player of the match: Navin Stewart

- Empire State Titans won the toss and elected to bat
- Play reduced to 18 overs per side

18 September 2021
2:00 PM (EST)
Scorecard

Manhattan Yorkers; 119 (18.0)	v	New Jersey Stallions; 120/2 (18.4)
Smit Patel 42 (29); Rovman Powell 3/16 (4.0)		Saiteja Mukkamalla 50* (56); Raj Nannan 2/17 (4.0)

New Jersey Stallions won by 8 wickets (with 8 balls remaining)
Mercer County Park, New Jersey
Umpires: Garfield Hodge and Roan McFarlane
Player of the match: Saiteja Mukkamalla

- Manhattan Yorkers won the toss and elected to bat

18 September 2021
2:00 PM (EST)
Scorecard

The Philadelphians; 139/9 (20.0)	v	New England Eagles; 125/6 (20.0)
Derick Narine 53 (40); Rohit Maryada 3/23 (4.0)		Assad Fudadin 42 (37); Milind Kumar 3/14 (4.0)

The Philadelphians won by 14 runs
Franklin Field, Pennsylvania
Umpires: Mangesh Rane and Saravanakumar Venkatesan
Player of the match: Derick Narine

- The Philadelphians won the toss and elected to bat

19 September 2021
10:00 AM (EST)
Scorecard

Empire State Titans; 141/7 (20.0)	v	Manhattan Yorkers; 142/7 (20.0)
Bhaskar Yadram 37 (14); Manoj Acharya 4/13 (4.0)		Kevin Shah 49 (30); Damion Jacobs 3/17 (4.0)

Manhattan Yorkers won by 3 wickets
Mercer County Park, New Jersey
Umpires: Danny Khan and Bryan Caine
Player of the match: Kevin Shah

- Empire State Titans won the toss and elected to bat

19 September 2021
2:00 PM (EST)
Scorecard

The Philadelphians; 173/9 (20.0)	v	New Jersey Stallions; 175/4 (16.5)
Milind Kumar 44 (14); Justin Dill 3/22 (4.0)		Rovman Powell 71* (38); Jeremy Gordon 1/29 (4.0)

New Jersey Stallions won by 6 wickets (with 19 balls remaining)
Exton Park, Pennsylvania
Umpires: Mihir Patel and Ritesh Patel
Player of the match: Rovman Powell

- New Jersey Stallions won the toss and elected to bowl

=== Pacific Conference ===
==== Central Division ====
Pos	Team	Pld	W	L	NR	Pts	NRR
1	Austin Athletics	15	12	2	1	25	1.086
2	Houston Hurricanes	15	12	3	0	24	1.042
3	Michigan Cricket Stars	15	10	3	2	22	1.843
4	Irving Mustangs	15	6	7	2	14	0.118
5	St. Louis Americans	15	5	9	1	11	−0.257
6	Chicago Blasters	15	4	9	2	10	−0.800
7	Chicago Catchers	15	0	13	2	2	−2.355

Source: Major League Cricket
- Top two teams advance to the Quarterfinals
- advances to Quarterfinals to play 2nd-place Western Division side
- advances to Quarterfinals to play 1st-place Western Division side
Division matches

31 July 2021
10:00 AM (EST)
Scorecard

St. Louis Americans; 146/8 (20.0)	v	Chicago Blasters; 155/8 (20.0)
Unni GP 33 (19); Najam Iqbal 2/20 (4.0)		Shaheer Hasan 73 (47); Murali Basupalli 2/22 (4.0)

Chicago Blasters won by 9 runs
BPL Cricket Stadium, Illinois
Umpires: Mushir Laliwala and Shashank Gaddamanagu
Player of the match: Shaheer Hasan

- St. Louis Americans won the toss and elected to bowl

31 July 2021
10:00 AM (EST)
Scorecard

Michigan Cricket Stars; 120/7 (20.0)	v	Chicago Catchers; 195/6 (20.0)
Shreyas Ramesh 28 (27); Matthew Forde 2/19 (3.0)		Nikhil Kanchan 62 (40); Sikander Soleja 4/26 (4.0)

Michigan Cricket Stars won by 75 runs
Lyon Oaks Cricket Ground, Michigan
Umpires: Onkar Akolkar and Karthik Raghupathy
Player of the match: Nikhil Kanchan

- Chicago Catchers won the toss and elected to bowl

31 July 2021
10:00 AM (EST)
Scorecard

Austin Athletics; 175/7 (20.0)	v	Houston Hurricanes; 176/7 (20.0)
Awais Zia 54 (33); Ali Khan 3/22 (4.0)		Willem Ludick 53 (24); Laksh Parikh 4/22 (3.0)

Houston Hurricanes won by 3 wickets (with 0 balls remaining)
Moosa Stadium, Texas
Umpires: Owen Brown and Sadiq Khoja
Player of the match: Usman Rafiq

- Houston Hurricanes won the toss and elected to bowl
- Willem Ludick (HH) made his maiden MiLC fifty.

31 July 2021
2:00 PM (EST)
Scorecard

Chicago Catchers; 109 (19.1)	v	Michigan Cricket Stars; 110/3 (14.4)
Karan Kumar 38 (23); Harish Yelamanchali 3/9 (2.1)		Arjun Ajbani 38* (27); Akul Gupta 2/31 (3.0)

Michigan Cricket Stars won by 7 wickets (with 32 balls remaining)
Lyon Oaks Cricket Ground, Michigan
Umpires: Onkar Akolkar and Karthik Raghupathy
Player of the match: Harish Yelamanchali

- Chicago Catchers won the toss and elected to bat

31 July 2021
2:00 PM (EST)
Scorecard

St. Louis Americans; 133/8 (20.0)	v	Chicago Blasters; 115/8 (20.0)
Joshua Kind 43 (37); Datta Prakash Y 3/31 (4.0)		Mohit Patel 38 (32); Murali Basupalli 2/11 (2.0)

St. Louis Americans won by 18 runs
BPL Cricket Stadium, Illinois
Umpires: Matin Inamdar and Chirag Vaswani
Player of the match: Joshua Kind

- St. Louis Americans won the toss and elected to bat

31 July 2021
2:00 PM (EST)
Scorecard

Irving Mustangs; 108 (17.3)	v	Austin Athletics; 109/8 (17.1)
Corey Anderson 19 (18); Ali Bangash 4/23 (3.3)		Nitish Kumar 36 (31); Burt Cockley 3/27 (4.0)

Austin Athletics won by 2 wickets (with 17 balls remaining)
Moosa Stadium, Texas
Umpires: Owen Brown and Altaf Mahesania
Player of the match: Ali Bangash

- Irving Mustangs won the toss and elected to bat

7 August 2021
10:00 AM (EST)
Scorecard

St. Louis Americans; 182/4 (20.0)	v	Irving Mustangs; 160/8 (20.0)
Obus Pienaar 89* (53); Muhammad Saleem 1/25 (4.0)		Rohan Manekar 46 (26); Joshua Kind 3/26 (4.0)

St. Louis Americans won by 22 runs
McKinney Cricket Ground, Texas
Umpires: Sameer Pandekar and Partha Pattanaik
Player of the match: Obus Pienaar

- Irving Mustangs won the toss and elected to bowl

7 August 2021
10:00 AM (EST)
Scorecard

Michigan Cricket Stars; 134/8 (20.0)	v	Houston Hurricanes; 135/6 (17.4)
Nikhil Kanchan 49 (43); Karthik Gatepalli 3/14 (4.0)		Ashley Nurse 41* (20); Saad Bin Zafar 2/10 (4.0)

Houston Hurricanes won by 4 wickets (with 14 balls remaining)
Prairie View Cricket Complex, Texas
Umpires: Altef Mahesania and Rakesh Jain
Player of the match: Ashley Nurse

- Michigan Cricket Stars won the toss and elected to bat

7 August 2021
2:00 PM (EST)
Scorecard

Chicago Catchers; 77/9 (18.0)	v	Austin Athletics; 81/2 (9.5)
R Ravi Koppella 26 (19); Laksh Parikh 3/10 (4.0)		Jay Desai 28 (23); Ranadeep Aleti 2/16 (4.0)

Austin Athletics won by 8 wickets (with 49 balls remaining)
Moosa Stadium, Texas
Umpires: Naveed Siddiqui and Nasiruddin Momin
Player of the match: Laksh Parikh

- Austin Athletics won the toss and elected to bowl
- Play was reduced to 18 overs per side

7 August 2021
2:00 PM (EST)
Scorecard

Austin Athletics; 0/0 (0.0)	v	Chicago Blasters; 0/0 (0.0)

Play abandoned
Moosa Stadium, Texas
Umpires: Owen Brown and Nasiruddin Momin

- Match was washed out

8 August 2021
10:00 AM (EST)
Scorecard

Houston Hurricanes; 146/5 (20.0)	v	Chicago Blasters; 96 (18.3)
Rana Ali 44 (47); Najam Iqbal 2/34 (3.5)		Datta Prakash Y 22 (28); Ashley Nurse 3/14 (4.0)

Houston Hurricanes won by 50 runs
Prairie View Cricket Complex, Texas
Umpires: Cameron Best and Owen Brown
Player of the match: Ashley Nurse

- Chicago Blasters won the toss and elected to bowl

8 August 2021
10:00 AM (EST)
Scorecard

St. Louis Americans; 184 (19.5)	v	Irving Mustangs; 185/6 (19.5)
Surjit Singh 77 (41); Rayyan Pathan 3/23 (2.0)		Rayyan Pathan 72 (37); Kausthubh Sriperumbudoor 2/19 (2.0)

Irving Mustangs won by 4 wickets (with 1 ball remaining)
McKinney Cricket Ground, Texas
Umpires: Sameer Bandekar and Partha Pattanaik
Player of the match: Ninad Nimbalkar

- St. Louis Americans won the toss and elected to bat

8 August 2021
10:00 AM (EST)
Scorecard

Michigan Cricket Stars; 95 (19.1)	v	Austin Athletics; 96/3 (15.0)
Arjun Ajbani 28 (26); Jannisar Khan 3/6 (3.1)		Jannisar Khan 28* (24); Saad Bin Zafar 1/19 (4.0)

Austin Athletics won by 7 wickets (with 30 balls remaining)
Moosa Stadium, Texas
Player of the match: Jannisar Khan

- Austin Athletics won the toss and elected to bowl

8 August 2021
2:00 PM (EST)
Scorecard

Houston Hurricanes; 166/5 (20.0)	v	Chicago Catchers; 90 (20.0)
Sushant Modani 56 (47); Abhyu Garg 3/36 (4.0)		Pankaj Kampli 18 (21); Karthik Gatepalli 3/9 (4.0)

Houston Hurricanes won by 76 runs
Prairie View Cricket Complex, Texas
Umpires: Naveed Siddiqui and Owen Brown
Player of the match: Sushant Modani

- Chicago Catchers won the toss and elected to bowl

14 August 2021
10:00 AM (EST)
Scorecard

Michigan Cricket Stars; 221/5 (20.0)	v	Houston Hurricanes; 167/9 (20.0)
Ryan Scott 118 (48); Sushant Modani 4/44 (4.0)		Willem Ludick 60 (33); Matthew Forde 4/18 (4.0)

Michigan Cricket Stars won by 54 runs
Prairie View Cricket Complex, Texas
Umpires: Owen Brown and Sameer Bandekar
Player of the match: Ryan Scott

- Houston Hurricanes won the toss and elected to bowl
- Ryan Scott (MCS) made his first MiLC hundred

14 August 2021
10:00 AM (EST)
Scorecard

Irving Mustangs; 167/6 (20.0)	v	Chicago Catchers; 92/9 (20.0)
Corey Anderson 108* (57); Sandeep Sivaram 2/31 (4.0)		Karan Kumar 16 (18); Ali Sheikh 4/15 (4.0)

Irving Mustangs won by 75 runs
Moosa Stadium, Texas
Umpires: Rakesh Jain and Naveed Siddiqui
Player of the match: Corey Anderson

- Chicago Catchers won the toss and elected to bowl
- Corey Anderson (IM) made his first MiLC hundred

14 August 2021
2:00 PM (EST)
Scorecard

Austin Athletics; 169/8 (20.0)	v	St. Louis Americans; 169/6 (20.0)
Jannisar Khan 54 (38); Siddharth Trivedi 3/32 (4.0)		Obus Pienaar 51 (33); Laksh Parikh 2/14 (4.0)

Austin Athletics won in the Super Over tiebreaker by 1 wicket (with 1 ball remaining)
Moosa Stadium, Texas
Umpires: Sadiq Khoja and Naveed Siddiqui
Player of the match: Obus Pienaar

- Austin Athletics won the toss and elected to bat
- Super Over: St. Louis Americans 7/2 (0.5), Austin Athletics 10/1 (0.5).

14 August 2021
2:00 PM (EST)
Scorecard

Houston Hurricanes; 135 (19.0)	v	Chicago Blasters; 106 (19.0)
Saqib Saleem 39 (31); Najam Iqbal 3/20 (4.0)		Kamran Shaikh 21 (17); Karthik Gatepalli 4/19 (4.0)

Houston Hurricanes won by 29 runs
Prairie View Cricket Complex, Texas
Umpires: Owen Brown and Partha Pattanaik
Player of the match: Karthik Gatepalli

- Houston Hurricanes won the toss and elected to bat

15 August 2021
10:00 AM (EST)
Scorecard

St. Louis Americans; 135/8 (20.0)	v	Austin Athletics; 136/3 (18.5)
Obus Pienaar 38 (36); Jannisar Khan 3/20 (4.0)		Nitish Kumar 43* (36); Obus Pienaar 2/18 (4.0)

Austin Athletics won by 7 wickets (with 7 balls remaining)
Prairie View Cricket Complex, Texas
Umpires: Sadiq Khoja and Sameer Bandekar
Player of the match: Jannisar Khan

- Austin Athletics won the toss and elected to bowl

15 August 2021
10:00 AM (EST)
Scorecard

Chicago Blasters; 138/9 (20.0)	v	Irving Mustangs; 140/6 (19.5)
Kamran Shaikh 38 (31); Najaf Shah 2/22 (4.0)		Rehman Dar 41 (42); Najam Iqbal 2/11 (4.0)

Irving Mustangs won by 4 wickets (with 1 ball remaining)
Moosa Stadium, Texas
Umpires: Owen Brown and Naveed Siddiqui
Player of the match: Abnan Haroon

- Chicago Blasters won the toss and elected to bat

15 August 2021
2:00 PM (EST)
Scorecard

Chicago Catchers; 108/8 (19.4)	v	Houston Hurricanes; 43/0 (6.0)
Shreyas Ramesh 34 (32); Usman Rafiq 2/26 (4.0)		Majjid Zubair 26* (23); Karan Kumar 0/11 (2.0)

Houston Hurricanes won by 10 wickets (D/L)
Prairie View Cricket Complex, Texas
Umpires: Partha Pattanaik and Sadiq Khoja
Player of the match: Usman Rafiq

- Houston Hurricanes won the toss and elected to bowl
- Play was reduced to 6 overs for the Houston Hurricanes
- Houston Hurricanes were set a revised total of 27

15 August 2021
2:00 PM (EST)
Scorecard

Irving Mustangs; 95/6 (14.0)	v	Michigan Cricket Stars; 0/0 (0.0)
Ali Sheikh 17* (21); Zia Khan 2/16 (3.0)

Play abandoned
Moosa Stadium, Texas

- Irving Mustangs won the toss and elected to bat

21 August 2021
10:00 AM (EST)
Scorecard

Michigan Cricket Stars; 129 (19.3)	v	St. Louis Americans; 88 (18.0)
Shaker Ahmed 23 (27); Sagar Thakkar 3/17 (4.0)		Ankit Vora 20 (28); Zia Khan 3/15 (4.0)

Michigan Cricket Stars won by 41 runs
Lyon Oaks Cricket Ground, Michigan
Umpires: Karthik Raghupathy and Anupam Sharma
Player of the match: Zia Khan

- Michigan Cricket Stars won the toss and elected to bat

21 August 2021
10:00 AM (EST)
Scorecard

Chicago Catchers; 124/9 (20.0)	v	Chicago Blasters; 125/2 (19.0)
Pankaj Kampli 25 (32); Datta Prakash Y 3/13 (4.0)		Shaheer Hasan 49* (52); Deepchand Pinnaka 1/22 (4.0)

Chicago Blasters won by 8 wickets (with 6 balls remaining)
BPL Cricket Stadium, Illinois
Umpires: Matin Inamdar and Mushir Laliwala
Player of the match: Datta Prakash Y

- Chicago Catchers won the toss and elected to bat

21 August 2021
2:00 PM (EST)
Scorecard

Michigan Cricket Stars; 188/4 (20.0)	v	St. Louis Americans; 138/9 (20.0)
Leniko Boucher 40 (22); Joshua Kind 2/39 (4.0)		Obus Pienaar 45 (30); Nicholas Kirton 4/23 (4.0)

Michigan Cricket Stars won by 50 runs
Lyon Oaks Cricket Ground, Michigan
Umpires: Karthik Raghupathy and Onkar Akolkar
Player of the match: Nicholas Kirton

- Michigan Cricket Stars won the toss and elected to bat

28 August 2021
10:00 AM (EST)
Scorecard

Chicago Blasters; 112/4 (20.0)	v	Austin Athletics; 97 (18.5)
Fahad Babar 68* (55); Jagrit Raj 1/9 (4.0)		Nitish Kumar 20 (23); Mohit Patel 3/13 (3.0)

Chicago Blasters won by 15 runs
BPL Cricket Stadium, Illinois
Umpires: Mushir Laliwala and Shashank Gaddamangu
Player of the match: Abul Hasan

- Austin Athletics won the toss and elected to bowl

28 August 2021
10:00 AM (EST)
Scorecard

St. Louis Americans; 98 (20.0)	v	Houston Hurricanes; 101/3 (15.4)
Unni GP 21 (32); Karthik Gatepalli 4/12 (4.0)		Willem Ludick 42* (36); Paras Marwaha 2/24 (3.4)

Houston Hurricanes won by 6 wickets (with 26 balls remaining)
ACAC Park, Missouri
Umpires: Srinivas Chirra and Abhishek Dwarki
Player of the match: Karthik Gatepalli

- St. Louis Americans won the toss and elected to bat

28 August 2021
10:00 AM (EST)
Scorecard

Chicago Catchers; 184/6 (20.0)	v	Irving Mustangs; 0/0 (0.0)
Shreyas Ramesh 45* (24); Corey Anderson 2/13 (3.0)

Play abandoned
Skokie Sports Park, Illinois
Umpires: Luckmal Panditharma

- Chicago Catchers won the toss and elected to bat

28 August 2021
2:00 PM (EST)
Scorecard

Austin Athletics; 132/7 (20.0)	v	Michigan Cricket Stars; 91 (16.0)
Shayan Jahangir 36 (35); Matthew Forde 2/18 (4.0)		Nikhil Kanchan 23 (25); Sidhesh Pathare 3/9 (3.0)

Austin Athletics won by 41 runs
BPL Cricket Stadium, Illinois
Umpires: Matin Inamdar and Mushir Laliwala
Player of the match: Sidhesh Pathare

- Austin Athletics won the toss and elected to bat

29 August 2021
10:00 AM (EST)
Scorecard

Houston Hurricanes; 156/9 (20.0)	v	St. Louis Americans; 157/4 (20.0)
Burhan Johar 46 (22); Obus Pienaar 3/22 (4.0)		Luke Schofield 64 (47); Naseer Jamali 2/32 (4.0)

St. Louis Americans won by 6 wickets
ACAC Park, Missouri
Umpires: Masroor Hussain and Srinivas Chirra
Player of the match: Obus Pienaar

- St. Louis Americans won the toss and elected to bowl

29 August 2021
10:00 AM (EST)
Scorecard

Chicago Catchers; 165/6 (20.0)	v	Austin Athletics; 170/4 (18.0)
Salman Ahmed 68* (64); Nitish Kumar 2/19 (4.0)		Shayan Jahangir 53* (27); Ankush Agrawal 2/20 (3.0)

Austin Athletics won by 6 wickets (with 12 balls remaining)
Skokie Sports Park, Illinois
Umpires: Luckmal Panditharma
Player of the match: Shayan Jahangir

- Austin Athletics won the toss and elected to bowl

29 August 2021
10:00 AM (EST)
Scorecard

Irving Mustangs; 92/6 (15.0)	v	Chicago Blasters; 70 (14.3)
Adnan Haroon 22* (13); Najam Iqbal 3/10 (3.0)		Ashhar Mehdi 15 (13); Junaid Nadir 2/7 (2.3)

Irving Mustangs won by 22 runs
BPL Cricket Stadium, Illinois
Umpires: Mushir Laliwala and Farhan Hashmi
Player of the match: Waqas Saleem

- Irving Mustangs won the toss and elected to bat
- Play reduced to 15 overs per side

29 August 2021
2:00 PM (EST)
Scorecard

Michigan Cricket Stars; 122/4 (17.2)	v	Irving Mustangs; 106/6 (17.0)
Ryan Scott 56 (44); Ali Sheikh 3/20 (4.0)		Corey Anderson 33* (34); Nicholas Kirton 2/21 (4.0)

Michigan Cricket Stars won by 22 runs (D/L)
BPL Cricket Stadium, Illinois
Umpires: Matin Inamdar and Chirag Vaswani
Player of the match: Ryan Scott

- Michigan Cricket Stars won the toss and elected to bat
- Play reduced to 17 overs per side, revised target of 129

4 September 2021
10:00 AM (EST)
Scorecard

Irving Mustangs; 114 (20.0)	v	San Diego Surf Riders; 120/1 (16.4)
Corey Anderson 25 (25); Brynley Richards 4/24 (4.0)		Mrunal Patel 59 (44); Adnan Haroon 1/25 (4.0)

San Diego Surf Riders won by 9 wickets (with 20 balls remaining)
Moosa Stadium, Texas
Umpires: Owen Brown and Sadiq Khoja
Player of the match: Mrunal Patel

- San Diego Surf Riders won the toss and elected to bowl

4 September 2021
2:00 PM (EST)
Scorecard

Austin Athletics; 189/2 (20.0)	v	SoCal Lashings; 125/9 (20.0)
Awais Zia 102 (61); Akash Singh 1/29 (4.0)		Sukhwant Sekhon 57 (31); Jagrit Raj 2/21 (4.0)

Austin Athletics won by 64 runs
Moosa Stadium, Texas
Umpires: Owen Brown and Sadiq Khoja
Player of the match: Awais Zia

- SoCal Lashings won the toss and elected to bowl

4 September 2021
2:00 PM (EST)
Scorecard

Hollywood Master Blasters; 134/3 (20.0)	v	Houston Hurricanes; 135/3 (16.2)
Cody Chetty 60 (53); Naseer Jamali 2/26 (4.0)		Willem Ludick 51* (32); Venukalyan Madireddy 1/31 (4.0)

Houston Hurricanes won by 7 wickets (with 22 balls remaining)
Prairie View Cricket Complex, Texas
Umpires: Rakesh Jain and Partha Pattanaik
Player of the match: Willem Ludick

- Houston Hurricanes won the toss and elected to bowl

5 September 2021
10:00 AM (EST)
Scorecard

Michigan Cricket Stars; 178/6 (20.0)	v	East Bay Blazers; 162/9 (20.0)
Nicholas Kirton 48 (31); Sanjay Krishnamurthi 2/42 (4.0)		Srinivas Mohan 37 (29); Saad Bin Zafar 3/17 (4.0)

Michigan Cricket Stars won by 16 runs
ACAC Park, Missouri
Umpires: Srinivas Chirra and Priyatham Reddy
Player of the match: Nicholas Kirton

- East Bay Blazers won the toss and elected to bowl

5 September 2021
10:00 AM (EST)
Scorecard

Houston Hurricanes; 142/7 (20.0)	v	San Diego Surf Riders; 108/8 (20.0)
Saqlain Haider 48 (30); Brynley Richards 2/26 (3.0)		Sri Krishna A 21 (17); Karthik Gatepalli 3/25 (4.0)

Houston Hurricanes won by 34 runs
Prairie View Cricket Complex, Texas
Umpires: Naveed Siddiqui and Altaf Mahesania
Player of the match: Saqlain Haider

- San Diego Surf Riders won the toss and elected to bowl

5 September 2021
10:00 AM (EST)
Scorecard

SoCal Lashings; 131/9 (20.0)	v	Irving Mustangs; 132/1 (16.0)
Shiva Vashishat 32 (41); Ali Sheikh 2/18 (4.0)		Mohammad Saleem 67* (49); Muditha Fernando 1/18 (3.0)

Irving Mustangs won by 9 wickets (with 24 balls remaining)
Moosa Stadium, Texas
Umpires: Owen Brown and Sadiq Khoja
Player of the match: Mohammad Saleem

- SoCal Lashings won the toss and elected to bat

5 September 2021
10:00 AM (EST)
Scorecard

Chicago Blasters; 149/7 (20.0)	v	Golden State Grizzlies; 155/4 (16.3)
Anirudh Jonnavitula 53 (41); Zia Shahzad 3/30 (4.0)		Hammad Azam 52* (15); Datta Prakash Y 1/32 (4.0)

Golden State Grizzlies won by 6 wickets (with 21 balls remaining)
ACAC Park, Missouri
Umpires: Abhishek Dwarki and Mir Ahmed Ali
Player of the match: Hammad Azam

- Chicago Blasters won the toss and elected to bat

5 September 2021
2:00 PM (EST)
Scorecard

Austin Athletics; 150/7 (20.0)	v	Hollywood Master Blasters; 127/5 (20.0)
Awais Zia 63 (39); Basanta Regmi 2/19 (4.0)		Dhyan Ranatunga 39 (42); Sidhesh Pathare 2/4 (1.0)

Austin Athletics won by 23 runs
Moosa Stadium, Texas
Umpires: Sadiq Khoja and Partha Pattanaik
Player of the match: Awais Zia

- Austin Athletics won the toss and elected to bat

5 September 2021
2:00 PM (EST)
Scorecard

Seattle Thunderbolts; 131/8 (20.0)	v	St. Louis Americans; 121/8 (20.0)
Harmeet Singh 33 (25); Joshua Kind 2/19 (3.0)		Surjit Singh 28 (12); Shadley van Schalkwyk 2/16 (4.0)

Seattle Thunderbolts won by 10 runs
ACAC Park, Missouri
Umpires: Srinivas Chirra and Farhan Bobat
Player of the match: Harmeet Singh

- St. Louis Americans won the toss and elected to bowl

5 September 2021
2:00 PM (EST)
Scorecard

Silicon Valley Strikers; 195/2 (20.0)	v	Chicago Catchers; 153/6 (20.0)
Roshon Primus 58* (30); Sandeep Sivaram 1/28 (4.0)		Pankaj Kampli 75 (51); Roshon Primus 2/36 (5.0)

Silicon Valley Strikers won by 42 runs
ACAC Park, Missouri
Umpires: Abhishek Dwarki and Mir Ahmed Ali
Player of the match: Roshon Primus

- Chicago Catchers won the toss and elected to bowl

6 September 2021
10:00 AM (EST)
Scorecard

East Bay Blazers; 205/6 (20.0)	v	Chicago Catchers; 132 (20.0)
Sujith Gowda 93 (44); Ranadeep Aleti 2/28 (4.0)		Salman Ahmed 26 (27); Sanjay Krishnamurthi 2/16 (4.0)

East Bay Blazers won by 73 runs
ACAC Park, Missouri
Umpires: Masroor Hussain and Saquib Khan
Player of the match: Sujith Gowda

- East Bay Blazers won the toss and elected to bat

6 September 2021
10:00 AM (EST)
Scorecard

St. Louis Americans; 175/6 (20.0)	v	Golden State Grizzlies; 180/3 (15.1)
Obus Pienaar 82 (54); Neeraj Goel 4/42 (4.0)		Zia Shahzad 57 (25); Yashodhan Mahajan 2/29 (2.1)

Golden State Grizzlies won by 7 wickets (with 29 balls remaining)
ACAC Park, Missouri
Umpires: Srinivas Chirra and J Prakash Karjala
Player of the match: Neeraj Goel

- Golden State Grizzlies won the toss and elected to bowl

6 September 2021
10:00 AM (EST)
Scorecard

SoCal Lashings; 130/9 (20.0)	v	Houston Hurricanes; 131/4 (17.1)
Iftikhar Ahmed 25 (30); Karthik Gatepalli 2/25 (4.0)		Saqlain Haider 29* (15); Abhimanyu Rajp 2/25 (4.0)

Houston Hurricanes won by 6 wickets (with 19 balls remaining)
Prairie View Cricket Complex, Texas
Umpires: Sadiq Khoja and Naveed Siddiqui
Player of the match: Saqlain Haider

- Houston Hurricanes won the toss and elected to bowl

6 September 2021
10:00 AM (EST)
Scorecard

San Diego Surf Riders; 126/3 (15.0)	v	Austin Athletics; 130/3 (14.2)
Mrunal Patel 77 (43); Jannisar Khan 2/28 (3.0)		Nitish Kumar 42 (22); Ajay Sharma 1/10 (1.2)

Austin Athletics won by 7 wickets (with 4 balls remaining)
Moosa Stadium, Texas
Umpires: Owen Brown and Partha Pattanaik
Player of the match: Jannisar Khan

- Austin Athletics won the toss and elected to bowl
- Play reduced play to 15 overs per side

6 September 2021
2:00 PM (EST)
Scorecard

Irving Mustangs; 149/5 (20.0)	v	Hollywood Master Blasters; 116 (18.5)
Mohammad Saleem 55 (45); Sakthi Karimanal 2/11 (3.0)		Karan Viradiya 22 (19); Adnan Haroon 3/35 (4.0)

Irving Mustangs won by 33 runs
Moosa Stadium, Texas
Umpires: Cameron Best and Owen Brown
Player of the match: Mohammad Saleem

- Hollywood Master Blasters won the toss and elected to bowl

6 September 2021
2:00 PM (EST)
Scorecard

Michigan Cricket Stars; 182/6 (20.0)	v	Seattle Thunderbolts; 136 (18.1)
Saad Bin Zafar 42 (29); Shadley van Schalkwyk 2/38 (4.0)		Shadley van Schalkwyk 26 (22); Nicholas Kirton 3/19 (3.0)

Michigan Cricket Stars won by 46 runs
ACAC Park, Missouri
Umpires: Srinivas Chirra and Saquib Khan
Player of the match: Nicholas Kirton

- Seattle Thunderbolts won the toss and elected to bowl

6 September 2021
2:00 PM (EST)
Scorecard

Chicago Blasters; 168/6 (20.0)	v	Silicon Valley Strikers; 172/1 (18.1)
Kamran Shaikh 61 (38); Kulvinder Singh 4/19 (4.0)		Unmukt Chand 90* (63); Jedd Joseph 1/13 (1.0)

Silicon Valley Strikers won by 9 wickets (with 11 balls remaining)
ACAC Park, Missouri
Umpires: Abhishek Dwarki and Masroor Hussain
Player of the match: Unmukt Chand

- Silicon Valley Strikers won the toss and elected to bowl

11 September 2021
10:00 AM (EST)
Scorecard

Irving Mustangs; 171/7 (20.0)	v	Houston Hurricanes; 172/4 (19.5)
Ali Sheikh 59 (26); Shuja Naqvi 3/33 (4.0)		Saqlain Haider 63* (31); Najaf Shah 1/29 (4.0)

Houston Hurricanes won by 6 wickets (with 1 ball remaining)
Sandy Lake Cricket Ground, Texas
Umpires: Aziz Savul and Sadiq Khoja
Player of the match: Saqlain Haider

- Irving Mustangs won the toss and elected to bat

11 September 2021
2:00 PM (EST)
Scorecard

Chicago Catchers; 123/4 (20.0)	v	Chicago Blasters; 126/6 (19.1)
Karan Kumar 42 (48); Datta Prakash Y 2/16 (4.0)		Fahad Babar 59* (62); Karan Kumar 1/21 (4.0)

Chicago Blasters won by 4 wickets (with 5 balls remaining)
BPL Cricket Stadium, Illinois
Umpires: Mushir Laliwala and Chirag Vaswani
Player of the match: Fahad Babar

- Chicago Blasters won the toss and elected to bowl

12 September 2021
2:00 PM (EST)
Scorecard

Houston Hurricanes; 150/6 (20.0)	v	Austin Athletics; 151/5 (20.0)
Derwish Ali 30 (24); Laksh Parikh 2/24 (3.0)		Awais Zia 40 (39); Naseer Jamali 1/17 (4.0)

Austin Athletics won by 5 wickets
Prairie View Cricket Complex, Texas
Umpires: Owen Brown and Sadiq Khoja
Player of the match: Awais Zia

- Austin Athletics won the toss and elected to bowl

18 September 2021
10:00 AM (EST)
Scorecard

Michigan Cricket Stars; 249/4 (20.0)	v	Chicago Blasters; 148/6 (20.0)
Ryan Scott 107 (49); Datta Prakash Y 3/30 (4.0)		Shaheer Hassan 43 (37); Nicholas Kirton 4/23 (4.0)

Michigan Cricket Stars won by 101 runs
Lyon Oaks Cricket Ground, Michigan
Umpires: Victor Jebakumar and Phillip Allen
Player of the match: Ryan Scott

- Chicago Blasters won the toss and elected to bowl

18 September 2021
10:00 AM (EST)
Scorecard

Chicago Catchers; 134/5 (20.0)	v	St. Louis Americans; 136/4 (16.5)
Shiraz Najam 41 (36); Obus Pienaar 2/17 (4.0)		Surjit Singh 87* (45); Ranadeep Aleti 2/24 (4.0)

St. Louis Americans won by 6 wickets (with 19 balls remaining)
Skokie Sports Park, Illinois
Umpires: Mushir Laliwala and Farhan Hashmi
Player of the match: Surjit Singh

- St. Louis Americans won the toss and elected to bowl

18 September 2021
10:00 AM (EST)
Scorecard

Irving Mustangs; 92/8 (12.0)	v	Austin Athletics; 96/1 (7.0)
Mohammad Taha 16 (11); Laksh Parikh 3/24 (3.0)		Hamza Bangash 50* (19); Soorya Selvakumar 1/27 (2.0)

Austin Athletics won by 9 wickets (with 30 balls remaining)
Sandy Lakes Cricket Ground, Texas
Umpires: Sameer Bandekar and Partha Pattanaik
Player of the match: Hamza Bangash

- Austin Athletics won the toss and elected to bowl
- Play reduced to 12 over per side

18 September 2021
2:00 PM (EST)
Scorecard

Chicago Blasters; 144/7 (20.0)	v	Michigan Cricket Stars; 149/5 (17.0)
Shaheer Hassan 54 (36); Matthew Forde 2/39 (4.0)		Nikhil Kanchan 48* (37); Najam Iqbal 3/23 (4.0)

Michigan Cricket Stars won by 5 wickets (with 18 balls remaining)
Lyon Oaks Cricket Ground, Michigan
Umpires: Victor Jebakumar and Phillip Allen
Player of the match: Nikhil Kanchan

- Chicago Blasters won the toss and elected to bat

18 September 2021
2:00 PM (EST)
Scorecard

Chicago Catchers; 161/6 (20.0)	v	St. Louis Americans; 166/1 (15.0)
Salman Ahmed 63 (47); Sagar Thakkar 2/45 (4.0)		Jeremiah Cruickshank 45* (29); Ranadeep Aleti 1/16 (2.0)

St. Louis Americans won by 9 wickets (with 30 balls remaining)
Skokie Sports Park, Illinois
Umpires: Mushir Laliwala and Chirag Vaswani
Player of the match: Jeremiah Cruickshank

- St. Louis Americans won the toss and elected to bowl

18 September 2021
2:00 PM (EST)
Scorecard

Irving Mustangs; 147/7 (20.0)	v	Houston Hurricanes; 150/5 (16.1)
Corey Anderson 48 (33); Naseer Jamali 2/27 (4.0)		Ashley Nurse 33* (16); Saqib Hameed 3/33 (4.0)

Houston Hurricanes won by 5 wickets (with 23 balls remaining)
Sandy Lakes Cricket Ground, Texas
Umpires: Sameer Bandekar and Partha Pattanaik
Player of the match: Ashley Nurse

- Houston Hurricanes won the toss and elected to bowl

==== Western Division ====
Pos	Team	Pld	W	L	NR	Pts	NRR
1	Golden State Grizzlies	15	12	2	1	25	1.276
2	Silicon Valley Strikers	15	11	3	1	23	0.494
3	East Bay Blazers	15	9	5	1	19	1.674
4	Seattle Thunderbolts	14	6	7	1	13	−0.379
5	SoCal Lashings	14	4	10	0	8	−0.031
6	San Diego Surf Riders	15	3	12	0	6	−0.868
7	Hollywood Master Blasters	15	2	13	0	4	−1.229

Source: Major League Cricket
- Top two teams advance to the Quarterfinals
- advances to Quarterfinals to play 2nd-place Central Division side
- advances to Quarterfinals to play 1st-place Central Division side
Division matches

31 July 2021
10:00 AM (PST)
Scorecard

East Bay Blazers; 79/4 (13.5)	v	Seattle Thunderbolts; 75/9 (20.0)
Chad Bowes 22 (20); Shadley van Schalkwyk 2/12 (4.0)		Shadley van Schalkwyk 20 (27); Rusty Theron 3/9 (4.0)

East Bay Blazers won by 6 wickets (with 37 balls remaining)
Morgan Hills Outdoor Complex, California
Umpires: Ravishankar Byrappagowda and Sundaram Subramanian
Player of the match: Rusty Theron

- East Bay Blazers won the toss and elected to bowl

31 July 2021
2:00 PM (PST)
Scorecard

Seattle Thunderbolts; 87/9 (20.0)	v	Golden State Grizzlies; 91/3 (16.2)
P Kumar Mudi 25 (32); Vatsal Vaghela 4/13 (4.0)		Shivam Mishra 34 (39); Anirudh Srinivas 1/9 (3.0)

Golden State Grizzlies won by 7 wickets (with 22 balls remaining)
Morgan Hills Outdoor Complex, California
Umpires: Ravishankar Byrappagowda and Shailendra Raj
Player of the match: Vatsal Vaghela

- Golden State Grizzlies won the toss and elected to bowl

1 August 2021
2:00 PM (PST)
Scorecard

Seattle Thunderbolts; 110/9 (20.0)	v	Silicon Valley Strikers; 111/8 (19.3)
Andries Gous 63* (54); Abhishek Paradkar 3/23 (4.0)		Shehan Jayasuriya 44* (39); Shadley van Schalkwyk 2/2 (3.3)

Silicon Valley Strikers won by 2 wickets (with 3 balls remaining)
Morgan Hills Outdoor Complex, California
Umpires: Sundaram Subramanian and Shailendra Raj
Player of the match: Shehan Jayasuriya

- Silicon Valley Strikers won the toss and elected to bowl

1 August 2021
2:00 PM (PST)
Scorecard

Hollywood Master Blasters; 100/7 (20.0)	v	San Diego Surf Riders; 101/5 (18.3)
Cody Chetty 39* (43); Timil Patel 3/14 (4.0)		Brynley Richards 31* (26); Karan Viradiya 2/15 (4.0)

San Diego Surf Riders won by 5 wickets (with 9 balls remaining)
Canyonside Park, California
Umpires: Bandula Hettiarachchi and Pankaj Chaudhari
Player of the match: Brynley Richards

- Hollywood Master Blasters won the toss and elected to bat

1 August 2021
2:00 PM (PST)
Scorecard

San Diego Surf Riders; 160/7 (20.0)	v	SoCal Lashings; 166/6 (19.5)
Mrunal Patel 73 (52); Aakashveer Singh 3/27 (4.0)		Peter Vittachi 39 (33); Siddarth Matani 2/20 (4.0)

SoCal Lashings won by 4 wickets (with 1 ball remaining)
Canyonside Park, California
Umpires: Bandula Hettiarachchi and Pankaj Chaudhari
Player of the match: Elmore Hutchinson

- San Diego Surf Riders won the toss and elected to bat

7 August 2021
10:00 AM (PST)
Scorecard

Hollywood Master Blasters; 130/7 (20.0)	v	Golden State Grizzlies; 131/5 (16.5)
Kanishka Chaugai 35 (26); Neeraj Goel 2/19 (4.0)		Zia Shahzad 50* (44); Khalid Zadran 4/15 (4.0)

Golden State Grizzlies won by 5 wickets (with 19 balls remaining)
Leo Magnus Cricket Complex, California
Umpires: Bandula Hettiarachchi and Pravin David
Player of the match: Zia Shahzad

- Hollywood Master Blasters won the toss and elected to bat

7 August 2021
10:00 AM (PST)
Scorecard

East Bay Blazers; 182/7 (20.0)	v	SoCal Lashings; 114/7 (20.0)
Sanjay Krishnamurthi 55 (30); Vedant Jain 2/28 (4.0)		Hammad Shahid 40* (28); Rusty Theron 3/15 (4.0)

East Bay Blazers won by 68 runs
Leo Magnus Cricket Complex, California
Umpires: Pravin David and Ashwin Shah
Player of the match: Sanjay Krishnamurthi

- East Bay Blazers won the toss and elected to bat

7 August 2021
2:00 PM (PST)
Scorecard

Silicon Valley Strikers; 119/8 (20.0)	v	Hollywood Master Blasters; 118/5 (20.0)
Narsingh Deonarine 59* (48); Karan Viradiya 3/16 (4.0)		Cody Chetty 49 (49); Saurabh Netravalkar 2/12 (4.0)

Silicon Valley Strikers won by 1 run
Leo Magnus Cricket Complex, California
Umpires: Bandula Hettiarachchi and Ashwin Shah
Player of the match: Narsingh Deonarine

- Silicon Valley Strikers won the toss and elected to bat

7 August 2021
2:00 PM (PST)
Scorecard

Seattle Thunderbolts; 119/8 (20.0)	v	San Diego Surf Riders; 120/3 (18.2)
Andries Gous 38 (20); Timil Patel 3/30 (4.0)		Marty Kain 55* (52); Shadley van Schalkwyk 2/14 (3.0)

San Diego Surf Riders won by 7 wickets (with 10 balls remaining)
Klahanie Park, Seattle
Umpires: Irshad Amjad and Kali Vinayag
Player of the match: Marty Kain

- San Diego Surf Riders won the toss and elected to bowl

8 August 2021
10:00 AM (PST)
Scorecard

Silicon Valley Strikers; 116 (19.1)	v	SoCal Lashings; 120/6 (18.5)
Rahul Jariwala 23 (27); Vedant Jain 2/11 (3.0)		Shamsher Singh 48 (36); Saurabh Netravalkar 2/10 (4.0)

SoCal Lashings won by 4 wickets (with 7 balls remaining)
Leo Magnus Cricket Complex, California
Umpires: Ashwin Shah and Pankaj Chaudhari
Player of the match: Shamsher Singh

- SoCal Lashings won the toss and elected to bowl

8 August 2021
2:00 PM (PST)
Scorecard

Seattle Thunderbolts; 205/3 (20.0)	v	San Diego Surf Riders; 172 (19.5)
Andries Gous 77 (45); Adnesh Tondale 1/18 (2.0)		Marty Kain 79* (37); Harmeet Singh 3/23 (4.0)

Seattle Thunderbolts won by 33 runs
Klahanie Park, Seattle
Umpires: Lucky Singh and Kali Vinayag
Player of the match: Andries Gous

- San Diego Surf Riders won the toss and elected to bowl

8 August 2021
2:00 PM (PST)
Scorecard

SoCal Lashings; 130/9 (20.0)	v	Golden State Grizzlies; 131/6 (17.5)
Harpreet Singh 58 (50); Zia Shahzad 3/27 (4.0)		Hammad Azam 55* (27); Elmore Hutchinson 2/15 (3.0)

Golden State Grizzlies won by 4 wickets (with 13 balls remaining)
Leo Magnus Cricket Complex, California
Umpires: Pankaj Chaudhari and Syed Taskeen
Player of the match: Hammad Azam

- SoCal Lashings won the toss and elected to bat

14 August 2021
10:00 AM (PST)
Scorecard

Silicon Valley Strikers; 156/4 (20.0)	v	San Diego Surf Riders; 141/4 (20.0)
Shehan Jayasuriya 74 (62); Zubair Murad 2/19 (4.0)		Marty Kain 40 (34); Saurabh Netravalkar 1/13 (4.0)

Silicon Valley Strikers won by 15 runs
Morgan Hills Outdoor Complex, California
Umpires: Ravishankar Byrappagowda and Sundaram Subramanian
Player of the match: Shehan Jayasuriya

- San Diego Surf Riders won the toss and elected to bowl

14 August 2021
2:00 PM (PST)
Scorecard

Hollywood Master Blasters; 100/6 (20.0)	v	Seattle Thunderbolts; 101/6 (19.0)
Muhammad Asad 34* (50); Abir Chippa 2/15 (4.0)		Manu Jacob 29* (29); Ajay Immadi 2/10 (3.0)

Seattle Thunderbolts won by 4 wickets (with 6 balls remaining)
Klahanie Park, Seattle
Umpires: Irshad Amjad and Lucky Singh
Player of the match: Manu Jacob

- Seattle Thunderbolts won the toss and elected to bowl

14 August 2021
2:00 PM (PST)
Scorecard

San Diego Surf Riders; 132/8 (20.0)	v	East Bay Blazers; 133/1 (14.0)
Sri Krishna A 48 (48); Josh Dascombe 2/12 (4.0)		Sujith Gowda 78* (46); Dillon Heyliger 1/11 (2.0)

East Bay Blazers won by 9 wickets (with 36 balls remaining)
Morgan Hills Outdoor Complex, California
Umpires: Ravishankar Byrappagowda and Sundaram Subramanian
Player of the match: Sujith Gowda

- San Diego Surf Riders won the toss and elected to bat

15 August 2021
10:00 AM (PST)
Scorecard

Hollywood Master Blasters; 108/3 (20.0)	v	Seattle Thunderbolts; 109/1 (15.0)
Cody Chetty 54* (57); Harmeet Singh 1/9 (4.0)		Andries Gous 75* (45); Khalid Zadran 1/23 (2.0)

Seattle Thunderbolts won by 9 wickets (with 30 balls remaining)
Klahanie Park, Seattle
Umpires: Kali Vinayag
Player of the match: Andries Gous

- Seattle Thunderbolts won the toss and elected to bowl

15 August 2021
10:00 AM (PST)
Scorecard

San Diego Surf Riders; 96 (20.0)	v	Golden State Grizzlies; 97/2 (14.1)
Sri Krishna A 19 (15); Vatsal Vaghela 3/16 (4.0)		Karan Chandel 51* (45); Siddarth Madani 2/21 (4.0)

Golden State Grizzlies won by 8 wickets (with 35 balls remaining)
Morgan Hills Outdoor Complex, California
Umpires: Ravishankar Byrappagowda and Shailendra Raj
Player of the match: Karan Chandel

- San Diego Surf Riders won the toss and elected to bat

15 August 2021
2:00 PM (PST)
Scorecard

Silicon Valley Strikers; 142/6 (20.0)	v	East Bay Blazers; 137/5 (20.0)
Shehan Jayasuriya 54 (50); Nawaz Khan 3/18 (4.0)		David Bunn 49 (57); Shehan Jayasuriya 2/21 (3.0)

Silicon Valley Strikers won by 5 runs
Morgan Hills Outdoor Complex, California
Umpires: Ravishankar Byrappagowda and Shailendra Raj
Player of the match: Shehan Jayasuriya

- East Bay Blazers won the toss and elected to bowl

21 August 2021
10:00 AM (PST)
Scorecard

SoCal Lashings; 118/5 (20.0)	v	Silicon Valley Strikers; 119/3 (16.2)
Ittikhar Ahmed 28 (28); Arsh Buch 2/22 (4.0)		Arsh Buch 65 (44); Aakash Singh 2/10 (3.0)

Silicon Valley Strikers won by 7 wickets (with 22 balls remaining)
Morgan Hills Outdoor Complex, California
Umpires: Ravishankar Byrappagowda and Sundaram Subramanian
Player of the match: Arsh Buch

- Silicon Valley Strikers won the toss and elected to bowl

21 August 2021
2:00 PM (PST)
Scorecard

Golden State Grizzlies; 175/3 (20.0)	v	SoCal Lashings; 130/9 (20.0)
Sami Aslam 86* (59); Sukhwant Sekhon 1/16 (4.0)		Harpreet Singh 57 (28); Zia Shahzad 3/21 (4.0)

Golden State Grizzlies won by 45 runs
Morgan Hills Outdoor Complex, California
Umpires: Ravishankar Byrappagowda and Shailendra Raj
Player of the match: Sami Aslam

- SoCal Lashings won the toss and elected to bowl

22 August 2021
10:00 AM (PST)
Scorecard

SoCal Lashings; 100/8 (20.0)	v	East Bay Blazers; 101/3 (14.0)
Iftikhar Ahmed 26 (23); Sanjay Krishnamurthi 4/12 (4.0)		David White 64 (49); Aakash Singh 2/18 (4.0)

East Bay Blazers won by 7 wickets (with 36 balls remaining)
Morgan Hills Outdoor Complex, California
Umpires: Ravishankar Byrappagowda and Shailendra Raj
Player of the match: Sanjay Krishnamurthi

- East Bay Blazers won the toss and elected to bowl

22 August 2021
2:00 PM (PST)
Scorecard

Golden State Grizzlies; 131/8 (20.0)	v	Silicon Valley Strikers; 134/3 (18.5)
Karan Chandel 45 (42); Abhishek Paradkar 3/25 (4.0)		Unmukt Chand 56* (57); Vatsal Vaghela 3/16 (4.0)

Silicon Valley Strikers won by 7 wickets (with 7 balls remaining)
Morgan Hills Outdoor Complex, California
Umpires: Sundaram Subramanian and Shailendra Raj
Player of the match: Unmukt Chand

- Silicon Valley Strikers won the toss and elected to bowl

28 August 2021
10:00 AM (PST)
Scorecard

Silicon Valley Strikers; 147/2 (20.0)	v	Hollywood Master Blasters; 148/3 (19.0)
Unmukt Chand 61 (54); Nisarg Patel 1/14 (4.0)		Cody Chetty 75 (54); Srinivas Raghavan 1/17 (4.0)

Hollywood Master Blasters won by 7 wickets (with 6 balls remaining)
Morgan Hills Outdoor Complex, California
Umpires: Ravishankar Byrappagowda and Sundaram Subramanian
Player of the match: Cody Chetty

- Hollywood Master Blasters won the toss and elected to bowl

28 August 2021
2:00 PM (PST)
Scorecard

Golden State Grizzlies; 176/6 (20.0)	v	San Diego Surf Riders; 144/8 (20.0)
Sami Aslam 67 (59); Marty Kain 1/15 (3.0)		Sri Krishna A 38 (39); Neeraj Goel 4/15 (4.0)

Golden State Grizzlies won by 32 runs
Morgan Hills Outdoor Complex, California
Umpires: Ravishankar Byrappagowda and Sundaram Subramanian
Player of the match: Sami Aslam

- San Diego Surf Riders won the toss and elected to bowl

28 August 2021
2:00 PM (PST)
Scorecard

SoCal Lashings; 134/7 (20.0)	v	Seattle Thunderbolts; 138/3 (18.4)
Elmore Hutchinson 47 (32); Anirudh Srinivas 3/21 (3.0)		Shadley van Schalkwyk 43 (35); Akash Singh 2/23 (3.0)

Seattle Thunderbolts won by 7 wickets (with 8 balls remaining)
Marymoor Park, Seattle
Umpires: Raiyo Aspanidar and Lucky Singh
Player of the match: Shadley van Schalkwyk

- SoCal Lashings won the toss and elected to bat

28 August 2021
2:00 PM (PST)
Scorecard

East Bay Blazers; 140/5 (20.0)	v	Hollywood Master Blasters; 88/2 (14.0)
Chad Bowes 53* (44); Venukalyan Madireddy 2/19 (4.0)		Cody Chetty 41* (40); Ruchir Joshi 1/19 (3.0)

East Bay Blazers won by 2 runs (D/L)
Morgan Hills Outdoor Complex, California
Umpires: Ravishankar Byrappagowda and Sundaram Subramanian
Player of the match: Chad Bowes

- Hollywood Master Blasters won the toss and elected to bowl
- Play reduced to 14 overs for the Hollywood Master Blasters, revised target of 91

29 August 2021
10:00 AM (PST)
Scorecard

Hollywood Master Blasters; 115/8 (20.0)	v	Golden State Grizzlies; 116/4 (18.1)
Cody Chetty 32 (30); Abheyender Singh 5/17 (4.0)		Saideep Ganesh 39 (37); Karan Viradiya 2/12 (2.0)

Golden State Grizzlies won by 6wickets (with 11 balls remaining)
Morgan Hills Outdoor Complex, California
Umpires: Ravishankar Byrappagowda and Abhishek Singh
Player of the match: Abheyender Singh

- Golden State Grizzlies won the toss and elected to bowl

29 August 2021
10:00 AM (PST)
Scorecard

East Bay Blazers; 176/5 (20.0)	v	San Diego Surf Riders; 126/9 (20.0)
Sujith Gowda 83 (54); Muhammad Sadiq 2/27 (4.0)		Marty Kain 44 (31); Josh Dascombe 3/15 (4.0)

East Bay Blazers won by 50 runs
Santa Clara Cricket Field, California
Umpires: Sundaram Subramanian and Shailendra Raj
Player of the match: Sujith Gowda

- San Diego Surf Riders won the toss and elected to bowl

29 August 2021
10:00 AM (PST)
Scorecard

SoCal Lashings; 119 (19.1)	v	Seattle Thunderbolts; 120/0 (11.3)
Harpreet Singh 59 (40); Anirudh Srinivas 3/22 (4.0)		Jagroop Raina 73* (33); Muditha Fernando 0/17 (3.0)

Seattle Thunderbolts won by 10 wickets (with 51 balls remaining)
Marymoor Park, Seattle
Umpires: Kali Vinayag and Raiyo Aspanidar
Player of the match: Jagroop Raina

- Seattle Thunderbolts won the toss and elected to bowl

29 August 2021
2:00 PM (PST)
Scorecard

Silicon Valley Strikers; 118/8 (20.0)	v	San Diego Surf Riders; 106 (20.0)
Unmukt Chand 30 (24); Timil Patel 3/23 (4.0)		Sri Krishna A 24 (30); Abhishek Paradkar 3/10 (3.0)

Silicon Valley Strikers won by 12 runs
Santa Clara Cricket Field, California
Umpires: Sundaram Subramanian and Shailendra Raj
Player of the match: Abhishek Paradkar

- Silicon Valley Strikers won the toss and elected to bat

29 August 2021
2:00 PM (PST)
Scorecard

East Bay Blazers; 188/5 (20.0)	v	Hollywood Master Blasters; 64 (19.5)
Sanjay Krishnamurthi 63* (33); Khalid Zadran 2/33 (4.0)		Dhyan Ranatunga 17 (29); Sanjay Krishnamurthi 3/13 (4.0)

East Bay Blazers won by 124 runs
Morgan Hills Outdoor Complex, California
Umpires: Ravishankar Byrappagowda and Abhishek Singh
Player of the match: Sanjay Krishnamurthi

- East Bay Blazers won the toss and elected to bat

11 September 2021
10:00 AM (PST)
Scorecard

East Bay Blazers; 116/9 (20.0)	v	Seattle Thunderbolts; 75/7 (20.0)
Mario Rampersaud 26* (20); Manoj Panwar 2/17 (4.0)		P Kumar Mudi 18* (25); Sujith Gowda 2/7 (3.0)

East Bay Blazers won by 41 runs
Morgan Hills Outdoor Complex, California
Umpires: Ravishankar Byrappagowda and Abhishek Singh
Player of the match: Josh Dascombe

- Seattle Thunderbolts won the toss and elected to bowl

11 September 2021
2:00 PM (PST)
Scorecard

Golden State Grizzlies; 128/8 (20.0)	v	Seattle Thunderbolts; 68/6 (20.0)
Hammad Azam 69* (46); Shadley van Schalkwyk 2/6 (4.0)		P Kumar Mudi 16 (35); Vatsal Vaghela 2/6 (4.0)

Golden State Grizzlies won by 60 runs
Morgan Hills Outdoor Complex, California
Umpires: Ravishankar Byrappagowda and Abhishek Singh
Player of the match: Hammad Azam

- Golden State Grizzlies won the toss and elected to bat

12 September 2021
10:00 AM (PST)
Scorecard

Silicon Valley Strikers; 164/5 (20.0)	v	Seattle Thunderbolts; 165/3 (19.2)
Rahul Jariwala 81 (55); Andries Gous 3/37 (4.0)		Shadley van Schalkwyk 79* (44); Roshon Primus 2/26 (4.0)

Seattle Thunderbolts won by 7 wickets (with 4 balls remaining)
Morgan Hills Outdoor Complex, California
Umpires: Ravishankar Byrappagowda and Shailendra Raj
Player of the match: Shadley van Schalkwyk

- Seattle Thunderbolts won the toss and elected to bowl

12 September 2021
10:00 AM (PST)
Scorecard

San Diego Surf Riders; 104/8 (20.0)	v	Hollywood Master Blasters; 89 (19.1)
Timil Patel 23 (22); Saikiran Valaboju 2/16 (4.0)		Karan Viradiya 19 (13); Marty Kain 4/14 (4.0)

San Diego Surf Riders won by 15 runs
Canyonside Park, California
Umpires: Pankaj Chaudhari and Ananda Weerasinge
Player of the match: Marty Kain

- Hollywood Master Blasters won the toss and elected to bowl

12 September 2021
2:00 PM (PST)
Scorecard

SoCal Lashings; 147/8 (20.0)	v	San Diego Surf Riders; 112/9 (20.0)
Iftikhar Ahmed 47 (48); Siddharth Matani 3/32 (4.0)		Brynley Richards 31 (33); Vedant Jain 3/13 (3.0)

SoCal Lashings won by 35 runs
Canyonside Park, California
Umpires: Pankaj Chaudhari and Ananda Weerasinge
Player of the match: Iftikhar Ahmed

- SoCal Lashings won the toss and elected to bat

12 September 2021
2:00 PM (PST)
Scorecard

East Bay Blazers; 146/8 (20.0)	v	Golden State Grizzlies; 147/5 (18.5)
David White 76 (54); Vatsal Vaghela 3/27 (4.0)		Sami Aslam 46 (34); Rusty Theron 2/25 (3.5)

Golden State Grizzlies won by 5 wickets (with 7 balls remaining)
Morgan Hills Outdoor Complex, California
Umpires: Ravishankar Byrappagowda and Shailendra Raj
Player of the match: Zia Shahzad

- Golden State Grizzlies won the toss and elected to bowl

18 September 2021
10:00 AM (PST)
Scorecard

SoCal Lashings; 132/5 (20.0)	v	Hollywood Master Blasters; 134/5 (19.3)
Iftikhar Ahmed 52 (45); Anish Deshpande 2/22 (4.0)		Cody Chetty 43* (31); Vedant Jain 2/20 (4.0)

Hollywood Master Blasters won by 5 wickets (with 3 balls remaining)
Leo Magnus Cricket Complex, California
Umpires: Ashwin Shah and Bandula Hettiarachchi
Player of the match: Cody Chetty

- Hollywood Master Blasters won the toss and elected to bowl

18 September 2021
2:00 PM (PST)
Scorecard

Silicon Valley Strikers; 185/7 (20.0)	v	East Bay Blazers; 172/6 (20.0)
Unmukt Chand 64 (54); Rusty Theron 2/25 (4.0)		Sujith Gowda 84 (47); Pranay Suri 2/29 (4.0)

Silicon Valley Strikers won by 13 runs
Morgan Hills Outdoor Complex, California
Umpires: Ravishankar Byrappagowda and Sundaram Subramanian
Player of the match: Unmukt Chand

- East Bay Blazers won the toss and elected to bowl

18 September 2021
2:00 PM (PST)
Scorecard

SoCal Lashings; 220/5 (20.0)	v	Hollywood Master Blasters; 161/7 (20.0)
Harpreet Singh 118 (53); Venukalyan Madireddy 3/36 (4.0)		Prithu Baskota 89 (46); Sukhwant Sekhon 3/23 (4.0)

SoCal Lashings won by 59 runs
Leo Magnus Cricket Complex, California
Umpires: Ashwin Shah and Bandula Hettiarachchi
Player of the match: Harpeet Singh

- SoCal Lashings won the toss and elected to bat
- Harpreet Singh (SCL) made his first MiLC hundred

19 September 2021
10:00 AM (PST)
Scorecard

Golden State Grizzlies; 106 (18.1)	v	Silicon Valley Strikers; 111/7 (19.1)
Mohit Nataraj 38 (21); Dev Thadani 3/14 (4.0)		Gary Graham 39* (34); Hammad Azam 3/9 (4.0)

Silicon Valley Strikers won by 3 wickets (with 5 balls remaining)
Arroyo Park, California
Umpires: Ravishankar Byrappagowda and Abhishek Singh
Player of the match: Gary Graham

- Silicon Valley Strikers won the toss and elected to bowl

19 September 2021
2:00 PM (PST)
Scorecard

East Bay Blazers; 159/7 (20.0)	v	Golden State Grizzlies; 163/3 (19.1)
Arshdeep Brar 52 (30); Zia Shahzad 3/32 (4.0)		Sami Aslam 79 (58); Nawaz Khan 1/36 (3.1)

Golden State Grizzlies won by 7 wickets (with 5 balls remaining)
Arroyo Park, California
Umpires: Abhishek Singh and Shailendra Raj
Player of the match: Sami Aslam

- East Bay Blazers won the toss and elected to bat

== Playoffs ==
Quarter-finals
25-26 September 2021 - North Carolina
Morrisville Cardinals	0
New Jersey Stallions	2
25-26 September 2021 - Georgia
Atlanta Fire	1
Empire State Titans	2
25-26 September 2021 - Texas
Austin Athletics	1
Silicon Valley Strikers	2
25-26 September 2021 - California
Golden State Grizzlies	2
Houston Hurricanes	0

Semi-finals
2 October 2021 - North Carolina
Empire State Titans	125
New Jersey Stallions	126/5
2 October 2021 - North Carolina
Silicon Valley Strikers	168/5
Golden State Grizzlies	135

Final
3 October 2021 - North Carolina
New Jersey Stallions	141
Silicon Valley Strikers	142/4

=== Quarter-finals ===
25 September 2021
10:00 AM (EST)
Scorecard

Empire State Titans; 189/5 (20.0)	v	Atlanta Fire; 188/5 (20.0)
Bhaskar Yadram 50* (25); Ateendra Subramanian 3/31 (4.0)		Steven Taylor 64 (34); Christopher Barnwell 2/39 (4.0)

Empire State Titans won by 1 run
Atlanta Cricket Fields, Georgia
Umpires: Jermaine Lindo and Tarak Janapareddy
Player of the match: Bhaskar Yadram

- Atlanta Fire won the toss and elected to bowl

25 September 2021
10:00 AM (EST)
Scorecard

Golden State Grizzlies; 173/5 (20.0)	v	Houston Hurricanes; 162 (19.2)
Sami Aslam 65* (58); Ali Khan 1/27 (4.0)		Willem Ludick 59 (33); Neeraj Goel 4/24 (4.0)

Golden State Grizzlies won by 11 runs
Arroyo Park, California
Umpires: Ravishankar Byrappagowda and Matin Inamdar
Player of the match: Neeraj Goel

- Houston Hurricanes won the toss and elected to bowl

25 September 2021
10:00 AM (EST)
Scorecard

Silicon Valley Strikers; 174/5 (20.0)	v	Austin Athletics; 166/9 (20.0)
Shehan Jayasuriya 78 (51); Jagrit Raj 1/13 (3.0)		Hamza Bangash 67 (50); Abhishek Paradkar 2/33 (4.0)

Silicon Valley Strikers won by 8 runs
Moosa Stadium, Texas
Umpires: Sameer Bandekar and Colin Edwards
Player of the match: Shehan Jayasuriya

- Austin Athletics won the toss and elected to bowl

25 September 2021
10:00 AM (EST)
Scorecard

Morrisville Cardinals; 103 (20.0)	v	New Jersey Stallions; 109/4 (17.2)
Siva Kumar 32 (27); Sachin Mylavarapu 2/9 (4.0)		Saiteja Mukkamalla 28 (24); Karthikeya Jagadish 1/6 (4.0)

New Jersey Stallions won by 6 wickets (with 16 balls remaining)
Church Street Park, North Carolina
Umpires: Vijaya Mallela and Owen Brown
Player of the match: Sachin Mylavarapu

- New Jersey Stallions won the toss and elected to bowl

25 September 2021
2:00 PM (EST)
Scorecard

Atlanta Fire; 209/8 (20.0)	v	Empire State Titans; 210/5 (19.4)
Christopher Barnwell 82 (40); Corné Dry 3/25 (4.0)		Steven Taylor 80 (43); Damion Jacobs 3/28 (3.0)

Atlanta Fire won by 5 wickets (with 2 balls remaining)
Atlanta Cricket Fields, Georgia
Umpires: Jermaine Lindo and Tarak Janapareddy
Player of the match: Steven Taylor

- Atlanta Fire won the toss and elected to bowl

25 September 2021
2:00 PM (EST)
Scorecard

Houston Hurricanes; 136/9 (20.0)	v	Golden State Grizzlies; 140/1 (16.0)
Willem Ludick 31 (26); Abheyender Singh 4/24 (4.0)		Zia Shahzad 74* (48); Ali Khan 1/24 (3.0)

Golden State Grizzlies won by 9 wickets (with 24 balls remaining)
Arroyo Park, California
Umpires: Matin Inamdar and Ravishankar Byrappagowda
Player of the match: Abheyender Singh

- Houston Hurricanes won the toss and elected to bat

25 September 2021
2:00 PM (EST)
Scorecard

Silicon Valley Strikers; 155/9 (20.0)	v	Austin Athletics; 156/3 (17.3)
Pranay Suri 77 (49); Derval Green 3/17 (4.0)		William Perkins 53 (31); Roshon Primus 2/23 (3.0)

Austin Athletics won by 7 wickets (with 15 balls remaining)
Moosa Stadium, Texas
Umpires: Sameer Bandekar and Colin Edwards
Player of the match: William Perkins

- Silicon Valley Strikers won the toss and elected to bat

25 September 2021
2:00 PM (EST)
Scorecard

New Jersey Stallions; 183/7 (20.0)	v	Morrisville Cardinals; 142/9 (20.0)
Rovman Powell 61 (37); Murali Ankaraju 2/25 (4.0)		Murali Ankaraju 33* (19); Stephen Wiig 2/23 (4.0)

New Jersey Stallions won by 41 runs
Church Street Park, North Carolina
Umpires: Vijaya Mallela and Owen Brown
Player of the match: Rovman Powell

- Morrisville Cardinals won the toss and elected to bowl

26 September 2021
10:00 AM (EST)
Scorecard

Atlanta Fire; 147/7 (20.0)	v	Empire State Titans; 149/2 (16.4)
Ridwan Palash 39 (28); Trinson Carmichael 2/24 (4.0)		Jaladh Dua 55 (43); Amila Aponso 1/30 (3.4)

Empire State Titans won by 8 wickets (with 20 balls remaining)
Atlanta Cricket Fields, Georgia
Umpires: Jermaine Lindo and Tarak Janapareddy
Player of the match: Jaladh Dua

- Empire State Titans won the toss and elected to bowl

26 September 2021
10:00 AM (EST)
Scorecard

Austin Athletics; 184/9 (20.0)	v	Silicon Valley Strikers; 188/4 (19.3)
Hamza Bangash 60 (29); Roshon Primus 2/31 (4.0)		Unmukt Chand 132* (69); Jagrit Raj 1/36 (4.0)

Silicon Valley Strikers won by 6 wickets (with 3 balls remaining)
Moosa Stadium, Texas
Umpires: Sameer Bandekar and Colin Edwards
Player of the match: Unmukt Chand

- Silicon Valley Strikers won the toss and elected to bowl
- Unmukt Chand (SVS) made his maiden MiLC hundred

=== Semi-finals ===
2 October 2021
10:00 AM (EST)
Scorecard

Empire State Titans; 125 (19.5)	v	New Jersey Stallions; 126/5 (18.5)
Jaladh Dua 39 (32); Sachin Mylavarapu 2/14 (4.0)		Dominique Rikhi 34 (43); Damion Jacobs 1/22 (4.0)

New Jersey Stallions won by 5 wickets (with 7 balls remaining)
Church Street Park, North Carolina
Player of the match: Rovman Powell

- New Jersey Stallions won the toss and elected to bowl

2 October 2021
2:00 PM (EST)
Scorecard

Silicon Valley Strikers; 168/5 (20.0)	v	Golden State Grizzlies; 135 (19.1)
Unmukt Chand 59 (43); Neeraj Goel 2/17 (3.0)		Mohit Nataraj 48 (33); Kulvinder Singh 2/19 (4.0)

Silicon Valley Strikers won by 33 runs
Church Street Park, North Carolina
Player of the match: Unmukt Chand

- Golden State Grizzlies won the toss and elected to bowl

=== Final ===
3 October 2021
2:00 PM (EST)
Scorecard

New Jersey Stallions; 141 (20.0)	v	Silicon Valley Strikers; 142/4 (18.1)
Dominique Rikhi 42 (33); Kulvinder Singh 3/32 (4.0)		Narsingh Deonarine 52* (43); Sachin Mylavarapu 1/10 (3.0)

Silicon Valley Strikers won by 6 wickets (with 11 balls remaining)
Church Street Park, North Carolina
Umpires: Jermaine Lindo and Vijaya Mallela
Player of the match: Narsingh Deonarine

- New Jersey Stallions won the toss and elected to bat
- Silicon Valley Strikers (SVS) won the 2021 Minor League Cricket championship as of this match.

== Statistics ==
=== Most runs ===
Player	Team	Mat	Inns	Runs	Ave	SR	HS	100	50	4s	6s
Unmukt Chand	Silicon Valley Strikers	16	16	612	51.00	125.15	132	1	5	59	23
Trevon Griffith	Empire State Titans	18	18	566	37.73	148.56	87	0	5	35	37
Ravi Inder Singh	DC Hawks	16	16	564	40.29	125.33	80	0	4	30	29
Christopher Barnwell	Empire State Titans	16	16	559	50.82	151.49	114	1	2	28	45
Xavier Marshall	NJ Somerset Cavaliers	15	15	542	41.69	147.28	105	1	4	28	47
Source: Minor League Cricket

=== Most wickets ===
Player	Team	Mat	Inns	Wkts	BBI	Avg	Econ	SR	4w	5w
Damion Jacobs	Empire State Titans	18	18	32	5/16	12.34	6.39	11.6	0	1
Corné Dry	Atlanta Fire	16	16	30	4/10	14.07	7.03	12.0	2	0
Vatsal Vaghela	Golden State Grizzlies	17	17	29	4/13	11.41	5.49	12.5	1	0
Sarabjit Ladda	DC Hawks	16	16	29	5/22	14.62	7.09	12.4	2	1
Stephen Wiig	New Jersey Stallions	18	18	27	4/35	15.59	6.74	13.9	1	0
Source: Minor League Cricket
