= Daniel Williams (cricketer) =

English cricketer

Personal information
- Full name: Daniel Mark Williams
- Born: December 1981 (age 44); Newbury, Berkshire, England
- Batting: Right-handed
- Bowling: Right-arm medium-fast

Domestic team information
- Years: Team
- 2008: Loughborough UCCE
- 2001 and 2003: Berkshire

Career statistics
Competition	First-class
Matches	2
Runs scored	25
Batting average	8.33
100s/50s	–/–
Top score	11
Balls bowled	–
Wickets	–
Bowling average	–
5 wickets in innings	–
10 wickets in match	–
Best bowling	–
Catches/stumpings	–/–
- Source: Cricinfo, 16 August 2011

Daniel Mark Williams (born December 1981) is an English cricketer. Williams is a right-handed batsman who bowls right-arm medium-fast. He was born in Newbury, Berkshire.

Williams made his debut for Berkshire in the 2001 Minor Counties Championship against Dorset. He made a further appearance for Berkshire in the 2003 Minor Counties Championship against Cheshire. Later, while studying for his degree at Loughborough University, Williams made his first-class debut for Loughborough UCCE against Surrey in 2008. He made a further appearance for the team in 2008, against Gloucestershire. In his two first-class matches, he scored 25 runs at an average of 8.33, with a high score of 11.
