= Gary Graham (cricketer) =

Jamaican cricketer (born 1982)

Personal information
- Born: 6 August 1982 (age 44); Trewlawny, Jamaica
- Source: Cricinfo, 5 November 2020

Gary Graham (born 6 August 1982) is a Jamaican cricketer. He played in one List A match for the Jamaican cricket team in 2005, during South Africa's tour of the West Indies. In June 2021, he was selected to take part in the Minor League Cricket tournament in the United States following the players' draft.

== See also ==
- List of Jamaican representative cricketers
