= List of Czech Republic Twenty20 International cricketers =

This is a list of Czech Twenty20 International cricketers.

In April 2018, the ICC decided to grant full Twenty20 International (T20I) status to all its members. Therefore, all Twenty20 matches played between Czech Republic and other ICC members after 1 January 2019 have the full T20I status.

This list comprises all members of the Czech Republic cricket team who have played at least one T20I match. It is initially arranged in the order in which each player won his first Twenty20 cap. Where more than one player won his first Twenty20 cap in the same match, those players are listed alphabetically by surname (according to the name format used by Cricinfo).

Czech Republic played their first T20I on 30 August 2019 against Austria during the 2019 Romania T20 Cup.

== Key ==
General

- ‡ – Captain
- † – Wicket-keeper
- First – Year of debut
- Last – Year of latest game
- Mat – Number of matches played

Batting

- Runs – Runs scored in career
- HS – Highest score
- Avg – Runs scored per dismissal
- * – Batsman remained not out
- 50 – Half-centuries scored
- 100 – Centuries scored

Bowling

- Balls – Balls bowled in career
- Wkt – Wickets taken in career
- BBI – Best bowling in an innings
- Ave – Average runs per wicket

Fielding

- Ca – Catches taken
- St – Stumpings affected

== List of players ==
Statistics are correct as of 28 June 2026.

Czech Republic T20I cricketers
General					Batting					Bowling				Fielding		Ref
No.	Name	First	Last	Mat	Runs	HS	Avg	50	100	Balls	Wkt	BBI	Ave	Ca	St	Ref
1	Arshad Hayat	2019	2019	6	2	2	1.00	0	0	60	5	2/15	20.60	2	0	
2	Honey Gori	2019	2020	11	337	66	30.63	1	0	210	11	3/13	19.81	3	0	
3	Hilal Ahmad†	2019	2021	15	101	44*	10.10	0	0	–	–	–	–	8	2	
4	Edward Knowles‡†	2019	2021	14	124	23	12.40	0	0	–	–	–	–	7	0	
5	Kushalkumar Mendon	2019	2021	17	194	45*	32.33	0	0	166	9	3/19	25.77	2	0	
6	Naveed Ahmed	2019	2025	40	123	21	13.66	0	0	642	34	3/8	22.35	10	0	
7	Sumit Pokhriyal	2019	2020	9	200	79	25.00	1	0	12	1	1/23	23.00	1	0	
8	Shoumyadeep Rakshit	2019	2019	6	40	21	10.00	0	0	77	2	1/11	49.50	2	0	
9	Paul Taylor	2019	2021	11	16	7*	8.00	0	0	192	14	4/28	18.35	2	0	
10	Sameera Waththage	2019	2022	19	14	5*	7.00	0	0	354	17	3/4	25.52	4	0	
11	Sudesh Wickramasekara‡	2019	2026	37	779	104*	26.86	6	1	590	26	5/15	26.84	8	0	
12	Shaun Dalton	2019	2019	2	0	0	0.00	0	0	–	–	–	–	1	0	
13	Arun Ashokan‡	2019	2023	31	655	55*	27.29	3	0	449	20	3/32	29.00	14	0	
14	Sabawoon Davizi	2019	2026	42	1,210	115*	35.58	6	3	194	22	6/9	10.04	17	0	
15	Siddarth Goud	2019	2019	1	–	–	–	–	–	–	–	–	–	1	0	
16	Shripal Gajjar†	2020	2020	3	16	14	8.00	0	0	–	–	–	–	4	3	
17	Kyle Gilham	2020	2021	7	17	10*	–	0	0	168	6	2/34	27.00	2	0	
18	Surya Rengarajan	2020	2020	3	8	6*	–	0	0	30	2	1/21	25.00	0	0	
19	Ali Waqar	2021	2021	6	23	15	7.66	0	0	108	2	1/19	76.00	2	0	
20	Sahil Grover†	2021	2026	21	321	116	20.06	0	1	–	–	–	–	10	0	
21	Smit Patel	2021	2022	10	2	2*	0.66	0	0	90	6	18.16	4/34	3	0	
22	Satyajit Sengupta	2021	2022	9	27	9	9.00	0	0	108	4	3/35	42.25	1	0	
23	Vyshakh Jagannivasan	2021	2022	7	76	55	15.20	1	0	–	–	–	–	2	0	
24	Kayul Mehta	2021	2021	3	1	1	1.00	0	0	60	6	3/18	10.50	1	0	
25	Shubhranshu Chaudhary	2022	2025	9	23	12	7.66	0	0	130	7	3/17	25.71	3	0	
26	Divyendra Singh†	2022	2026	25	284	67*	14.94	2	0	–	–	–	–	20	5	
27	Dylan Steyn	2022	2024	21	568	106	27.04	2	1	–	–	–	–	13	0	
28	Ritik Tomar	2022	2026	29	312	38	13.56	0	0	228	10	2/18	33.80	17	0	
29	Sazib Bhuiyan	2022	2026	32	436	59	16.76	3	0	517	41	4/46	18.34	6	0	
30	Sharan Ramakrishnan	2022	2025	10	199	67*	28.42	2	0	24	0	–	–	1	0	
31	Sonny Clephane	2022	2022	2	1	1	1.00	0	0	12	0	–	–	0	0	
32	Ushan Thenannahelage†	2022	2022	9	24	10	6.00	0	0	–	–	–	–	3	4	
33	Tripurari Lal	2022	2022	8	3	3*	3.00	0	0	186	7	2/14	28.71	0	0	
34	Kranthi Venkataswamy	2022	2022	1	55	55	55.00	1	0	–	–	–	–	0	0	
35	Abul Farhad	2022	2025	13	12	6*	4.00	0	0	201	15	4/19	18.93	2	0	
36	Paaras Khari†	2023	2023	3	79	38*	39.50	0	0	–	–	–	–	4	0	
37	Venkatesh Marghashayam	2023	2026	7	16	10	4.00	0	0	78	6	2/21	22.00	5	0	
38	Rahat Ali	2023	2024	6	36	17	12.00	0	0	120	6	2/16	25.83	2	0	
39	Riaz Afridi	2023	2024	4	15	11	5.00	0	0	81	3	2/47	37.33	3	0	
40	Neeraj Tyagi	2023	2026	9	19	13*	9.50	0	0	156	6	2/27	36.16	0	0	
41	Martin Worndl	2024	2024	5	43	30*	10.75	0	0	–	–	–	–	1	0	
42	Muralidhara Vandrasi‡	2024	2025	8	164	42*	27.33	0	0	144	9	4/19	19.66	3	0	
43	Piyush Baghel	2025	2025	3	41	33	13.66	0	0	–	–	–	–	1	0	
44	Rhuturaj Magare	2025	2026	12	99	31	9.00	0	0	168	6	2/16	33.66	3	0	
45	Neeraj Mishra	2025	2026	7	4	4*	2.00	0	0	114	2	1/17	94.50	1	0	
46	Davidson Ramani	2025	2026	9	8	5*	8.00	0	0	180	10	2/26	27.30	3	0	
47	Ajhar Alam	2025	2026	4	5	4	2.50	0	0	78	3	2/28	45.33	0	0	
48	Sojib Miah	2025	2026	5	72	27	18.00	0	0	–	–	–	–	2	0	
49	Sagor Hossain	2025	2025	2	5	4	2.50	0	0	–	–	–	–	0	0	
50	Joseph Cope	2026	2026	2	23	23*	–	0	0	36	0	–	–	0	0	
51	Ratul Khan	2026	2026	4	200	123	66.66	1	1	36	0	–	–	2	0	
52	Saqlain Mukhtar	2026	2026	3	4	4*	–	0	0	54	3	2/22	20.66	2	0	
