= Shamsher Singh (cricketer, born 1983) =

Indian cricketer (born 1983)

Personal information
- Born: 28 December 1983 (age 41); Udaipur, Rajasthan
- Nickname: Babbu
- Batting: Right-handed
- Bowling: Right-arm off-spin
- Source: Cricinfo

Shamsher Singh (born 28 December 1983) is an Indian cricketer. He made his List A debut for Rajasthan in the 2005–06 Ranji Trophy on 10 February 2006. He made his first-class debut on 7 November 2003, for Rajasthan in the 2003–04 Ranji Trophy.
