= Rajesh Sharma (cricketer) =

Indian cricketer (born 1995)

Personal information
- Born: 28 November 1995 (age 30)
- Source: Cricinfo, 17 November 2019

Rajesh Sharma (born 28 November 1995) is an Indian cricketer. He made his Twenty20 debut on 17 November 2019, for Delhi in the 2019–20 Syed Mushtaq Ali Trophy.
