= Akshay Homraj =

American cricketer (born 1996)

Personal information
- Born: 30 April 1996 (age 30); Berbice, Guyana
- Batting: Right-handed
- Role: Wicket-keeper Batter

International information
- National side: United States
- ODI debut (cap 29): 8 December 2019 v UAE
- Last ODI: 12 February 2020 v Nepal
- Source: Cricinfo, 12 February 2020

Akshay Homraj (born 30 April 1996) is a Guyanese-born American cricketer. In November 2019, he was named in the United States' squad for the 2019–20 Regional Super50 tournament. He made his List A debut on 9 November 2019, for the United States in the Regional Super50 tournament.

In December 2019, he was named in the United States' One Day International (ODI) squad for the 2019 United Arab Emirates Tri-Nation Series. He made his ODI debut for the United States, against the United Arab Emirates on 8 December 2019. In June 2021, he was selected to take part in the Minor League Cricket tournament in the United States following the players' draft.
