= 2023 Major League Cricket players' draft =

2023 MLC draft

General information
- Sport: Cricket
- Date: March 19, 2023
- Time: 7:30 pm CST
- Location: Johnson Space Center, Houston, Texas
- Networks: YouTube; ESPNcricinfo; Sports18; JioCinema; A Sports

Overview
- League: Major League Cricket
- Teams: 6

The 2023 Major League Cricket players' draft took place on March 19, 2023, at Johnson Space Center in Houston, Texas.

The draft was conducted over 9 rounds via a "snake" format, where the team order is reversed every round. Out of the 9 rounds, 8 were general draft picks, with the final round being exclusively for U-23 players.

Out of the total of over 100 players who entered, a total of 54 players were drafted, with another 6 overseas players announced during the draft.

== Rules ==
Each team had to mandatorily pick a U-23 player in the ninth round, irrespective of whether or not they selected one in rounds before. Each team also had only three minutes to select a player in rounds 1–5, with the time shortened to 2 minutes for rounds 6–9. Additionally, there were no trading of picks allowed during the draft.

== Salary cap ==
The draft had fixed salary caps for each round, with the highest being $75,000 in the first round and the lowest being $2,500 in the ninth round.

- First Round – $75,000
- Second Round – $65,000
- Third Round – $50,000
- Fourth Round – $40,000
- Fifth Round – $35,000
- Sixth Round – $25,000
- Seventh Round – $15,000
- Eighth Round – $10,000
- Ninth Round – $2,500

== Draft order ==
Following a randomized order drew held at the Westin Oaks Houston on March 13, the Seattle Orcas had the first pick followed by the Washington Freedom, the MI New York, the San Francisco Unicorns, the Los Angeles Knight Riders, and the Texas Super Kings. As the draft was held in a "snake" format, the Super Kings then had the first pick in the second round, with the Orcas having the first pick again in the third.

== Draft selections ==
First round selections in the 2023 Major League Cricket players' draft
Pick	Player	Team	MiLC Team
1	Harmeet Singh	Seattle Orcas	Seattle Thunderbolts
2	Andries Gous	Washington Freedom	Seattle Thunderbolts
3	Steven Taylor	MI New York	Atlanta Fire
4	Corey Anderson	San Francisco Unicorns	Dallas Mustangs
5	Ali Khan	LA Knight Riders	Houston Hurricanes
6	Rusty Theron	Texas Super Kings	Bay Blazers

Second round selections in the 2023 Major League Cricket players' draft
Pick	Player	Team	MiLC Team
7	Calvin Savage	Texas Super Kings	Chicago Tigers
8	Unmukt Chand	LA Knight Riders	Silicon Valley Strikers
9	Liam Plunkett	San Francisco Unicorns	The Philadelphians
10	Hammad Azam	MI New York	Golden State Grizzlies
11	Mukhtar Ahmed	Washington Freedom	–
12	Shehan Jayasuriya	Seattle Orcas	Silicon Valley Strikers

Third round selections in the 2023 Major League Cricket players' draft
Pick	Player	Team	MiLC Team
13	Shubham Ranjane	Seattle Orcas	Seattle Thunderbolts
14	Obus Pienaar	Washington Freedom	Morrisville Raptors
15	Ehsan Adil	MI New York	Golden State Grizzlies
16	Tajinder Singh	San Francisco Unicorns	–
17	Jaskaran Malhotra	LA Knight Riders	DC Hawks
18	Lahiru Milantha	Texas Super Kings	Morrisville Raptors

Fourth round selections in the 2023 Major League Cricket players' draft
Pick	Player	Team	MiLC Team
19	Milind Kumar	Texas Super Kings	The Philadelphians
20	Nitish Kumar	LA Knight Riders	Lone Star Athletics
21	Chaitanya Bishnoi	San Francisco Unicorns	–
22	Nosthush Kenjige	MI New York	Dallas Mustangs
23	Saurabh Netravalkar	Washington Freedom	Silicon Valley Strikers
24	Cameron Gannon	Seattle Orcas	–

Fifth round selections in the 2023 Major League Cricket players' draft
Pick	Player	Team	MiLC Team
25	Aaron Jones	Seattle Orcas	Atlanta Fire
26	Saad Ali	Washington Freedom	Chicago Tigers
27	Monank Patel	MI New York	Empire State Titans
28	Carmi le Roux	San Francisco Unicorns	Bay Blazers
29	Corné Dry	LA Knight Riders	Atlanta Fire
30	Sami Aslam	Texas Super Kings	Golden State Grizzlies

Sixth round selections in the 2023 Major League Cricket players' draft
Pick	Player	Team	MiLC Team
31	Cameron Stevenson	Texas Super Kings	–
32	Ali Sheikh	LA Knight Riders	Dallas Mustangs
33	Brody Couch	San Francisco Unicorns	–
34	Sarabjit Ladda	MI New York	DC Hawks
35	Dane Piedt	Washington Freedom	Morrisville Raptors
36	Nauman Anwar	Seattle Orcas	Michigan Cricket Stars

Seventh round selections in the 2023 Major League Cricket players' draft
Pick	Player	Team	MiLC Team
37	Phani Simhadri	Seattle Orcas	Seattle Thunderbolts
38	Sujith Gowda	MI New York	Bay Blazers
39	Shayan Jahangir	Washington Freedom	Lone Star Athletics
40	David White	San Francisco Unicorns	Bay Blazers
41	Saif Badar	LA Knight Riders	–
42	Cody Chetty	Texas Super Kings	Hollywood Master Blasters

Eighth round selections in the 2023 Major League Cricket players' draft
Pick	Player	Team	MiLC Team
43	Zia Shahzad	Texas Super Kings	Golden State Grizzlies
44	Shadley van Schalkwyk	LA Knight Riders	Seattle Thunderbolts
45	Smit Patel	San Francisco Unicorns	Manhattan Yorkers
46	Kyle Phillip	MI New York	Atlanta Lightning
47	Justin Dill	Washington Freedom	St. Louis Americans
48	Angelo Perera	Seattle Orcas	Bay Blazers

Ninth round selections in the 2023 Major League Cricket players' draft
Pick	Player	Team	MiLC Team
49	Matthew Tromp	Seattle Orcas	Houston Hurricanes
50	Akhilesh Bodugum	Washington Freedom	Seattle Thunderbolts
51	Saideep Ganesh	MI New York	Bay Blazers
52	Sanjay Krishnamurthi	San Francisco Unicorns	Bay Blazers
53	Bhaskar Yadram	LA Knight Riders	Manhattan Yorkers
54	Saiteja Mukkamalla	Texas Super Kings	New Jersey Stallions

== Overseas signings ==
During the draft, a total of 6 overseas players were announced. Among these were Aaron Finch and Marcus Stoinis, who are set to play for the San Francisco Unicorns, Mitchell Marsh and Quinton de Kock, who are set to play for the Seattle Orcas, and Wanindu Hasaranga and Anrich Nortje who are set to play for the Washington Freedom.

== Squads ==
These were the squads for each team following the draft.

Squads at the end of 2023 Major League Cricket players' draft
Seattle Orcas	Washington Freedom	MI New York	San Francisco Unicorns	LA Knight Riders	Texas Super Kings
Mitchell Marsh; Quinton de Kock (wk); Harmeet Singh; Shehan Jayasuriya; Shubham Ranjane; Cameron Gannon; Aaron Jones; Nauman Anwar; Phani Simhadri; Angelo Perera; Matthew Tromp	Wanindu Hasaranga; Anrich Nortje; Andries Gous (wk); Mukhtar Ahmed; Obus Pienaar; Saurabh Netravalkar; Saad Ali; Dane Piedt; Sujith Gowda; Justin Dill; Akhilesh Bodugum	Steven Taylor; Hammad Azam; Ehsan Adil; Nosthush Kenjige; Monank Patel; Sarabjit Ladda; Shayan Jahangir; Kyle Phillip; Saideep Ganesh	Aaron Finch (c); Marcus Stoinis; Corey Anderson; Liam Plunkett; Tajinder Singh; Chaitanya Bishnoi; Carmi le Roux; Brody Couch; David White; Smit Patel (wk); Sanjay Krishnamurthi	Ali Khan; Unmukt Chand; Jaskaran Malhotra; Nitish Kumar; Corné Dry; Ali Sheikh; Saif Badar; Shadley van Schalkwyk; Bhaskar Yadram	Rusty Theron; Calvin Savage; Lahiru Milantha; Milind Kumar; Sami Aslam; Cameron Stevenson; Cody Chetty; Zia Shahzad; Saiteja Mukkamalla
