= 2026 Minor League Cricket season =

Twenty20 cricket tournament in America

- Dates: 17 September – October 25, 2026
- Administrators: USA Cricket; Major League Cricket
- Cricket format: Twenty20
- Tournament format(s): Round-robin and knockout
- Participants: 26
- Matches: 62
- Official website: minorleaguecricket.com

The 2026 Minor League Cricket season was the sixth season of Minor League Cricket, established by USA Cricket (USAC) and Major League Cricket (MLC) in 2019. The season was hosted over 8 venues across the United States from 17 September to 25 October 2026.

The tournament was won by the Chicago Kingsmen, who defeated the Baltimore Royals in the finals by 3 wickets,

== Teams and venues ==
The 2026 season of Minor League Cricket featured 26 teams competing across the United States. The season included a change in team ownership and identity, with the former Kings XI Dallas becoming All Stars Dallas ahead of the competition. The regular season consisted of 62 matches played from September 17 to September 27, followed by the playoffs and championship final in October.

The regular-season matches were scheduled across venues in California, Illinois, Missouri, New York, North Carolina and Texas. The playoffs were held at Prairie View Cricket Complex in Houston from October 21 to 23, while the championship final was scheduled at Kingsmen Arena on October 25.

=== Pacific Conference ===
Western Division

- East Bay Blazers (East Bay)
- Los Angeles Lashings (Los Angeles)
- San Diego Surf Riders (San Diego)
- San Ramon Grizzlies (San Ramon, California)
- Seattle Thunderbolts (Seattle)
- Silicon Valley Strikers (San Francisco Bay Area)
- MetroPlex Tracers (Dallas–Fort Worth metroplex)

Central Division

- Chicago
  - Chicago Kingsmen
  - Chicago Tigers
- Dallas
  - All Stars Dallas
  - Dallas Xforia Giants
- Lone Star Athletics (Austin)
- Michigan Cricket Stars (Michigan)
- St. Louis Americans (St. Louis)

=== Atlantic Conference ===
Eastern Division

- Empire State Titans (New York City)
- Manhattan Yorkers (Manhattan)
- New England Eagles (New England)
- New Jersey Somerset Cavaliers (Somerset, New Jersey)
- New Jersey Stallions (Jersey City, New Jersey)
- The Philadelphians (Philadelphia)
- NYC Titans (New York City)

Southern Division

- Atlanta
  - Atlanta Fire
  - Atlanta Lightning
- Baltimore Royals (Baltimore)
- Ft. Lauderdale Lions (Fort Lauderdale)
- Morrisville Raptors (Morrisville)
- Orlando Galaxy (Orlando)

=== Venues ===
The 2026 season used the following grounds for regular-season matches and the postseason:

- Church Street Park – Morrisville, North Carolina
- NY Ovals – Schenectady, New York
- ACAC Park – St. Louis area
- Strikers Cricket Ground – Morgan Hill, California
- Grand Prairie Stadium – Grand Prairie, Texas
- Kingsmen Stadium – Texas
- Knight Riders Cricket Ground – Pomona, California
- Davis Cricket Ground – Davis, California
- Los Angeles Cricket Ground – Encino, California
- Wright Cricket Field – California
- Param Veers Cricket Field – Dalton, Georgia
- Canyonside Park – San Diego, California
- Prairie View Cricket Complex – Houston, Texas (playoffs)
- Kingsmen Arena – Houston, Texas (championship final)

== League stage ==
The league stage ran from 17 to 27 September 2026.

== Results ==
=== Atlantic Conference ===
| Home \ Away | NEE | NJSC | NJS | MAY | PLP | NYT | BAR | ATF | ATL | FLL | MOR | OLG |
|---|---|---|---|---|---|---|---|---|---|---|---|---|
| Eagles | — | | | | | | | | | | | |
| Cavaliers | | — | | | | | | | | | | |
| Stallions | | | — | | | | | | | | | |
| Yorkers | | | | — | | | | | | | | |
| Philadelphians | | | | | — | | | | | | | |
| Titans | | | | | | — | | | | | | |
| Royals | | | | | | | — | | | | | |
| Fire | | | | | | | | — | | | | |
| Lightning | | | | | | | | | — | | | |
| Lions | | | | | | | | | | — | | |
| Raptors | | | | | | | | | | | — | |
| Galaxy | | | | | | | | | | | | — |

Updated to match(es) played on September 28, 2026. Source: Minor League Cricket
Legend: Blue = home team win; Yellow = draw; Red = away team win.
For upcoming matches, an "a" indicates there is an article about the rivalry between the two participants.

=== Pacific Conference ===
| Home \ Away | SVS | EBB | SRG | LAL | SDR | SET | LSA | CHK | CHT | DGI | MPT | KXD | MCS | SLA |
|---|---|---|---|---|---|---|---|---|---|---|---|---|---|---|
| Strikers | — | | | | | | | | | | | | | |
| Blazers | | — | | | | | | | | | | | | |
| Grizzlies | | | — | | | | | | | | | | | |
| Lashings | | | | — | | | | | | | | | | |
| Riders | | | | | — | | | | | | | | | |
| Thunderbolts | | | | | | — | | | | | | | | |
| Athletics | | | | | | | — | | | | | | | |
| Kingsmen | | | | | | | | — | | | | | | |
| Tigers | | | | | | | | | — | | | | | |
| Giants | | | | | | | | | | — | | | | |
| Tracers | | | | | | | | | | | — | | | |
| All Stars | | | | | | | | | | | | — | | |
| Stars | | | | | | | | | | | | | — | |
| Americans | | | | | | | | | | | | | | — |

Updated to match(es) played on September 28, 2026. Source: Minor League Cricket
Legend: Blue = home team win; Yellow = draw; Red = away team win.
For upcoming matches, an "a" indicates there is an article about the rivalry between the two participants.

== Playoffs ==
The playoffs featured eight teams competing in the Super 8 stage at the Prairie View Cricket Complex in Houston, Texas, from 21 to 23 October 2026. The championship final was played on 25 October 2026.

=== Final ===
The Chicago Kingsmen faced the Baltimore Royals in the championship final on 25 October 2026. Chicago Kingsmen defeated Baltimore Royals by three wickets to win their second Minor League Cricket title.

== See also ==
- 2026 Major League Cricket season
