= List of cricket grounds in the United States =

This is a list of cricket grounds in the United States. The grounds included in this list have held first-class, List-A and Twenty20 matches. Additionally, one has also hosted Twenty20 Internationals. Included in the list is St George's Cricket Club Ground, which is notable for holding the first international cricket match.

== International grounds ==
Official name	Other names	City or town	Capacity	Ends	Ref.
Central Broward Regional Park	Central Broward Stadium	Lauderhill	25,000	North End; Pavilion End	
Grand Prairie Stadium	QuikTrip Park, The Ballpark in Grand Prairie	Grand Prairie	7,200		
Moosa Stadium	Smart Choice Stadium	Pearland	2,500	Massey Ranch End; Pearland End	
Nassau County International Cricket Stadium (Only for 2024 ICC Men's T20 World Cup)	—N/a	East Meadow	34,000	North End; South End	
Prairie View Cricket Complex	—N/a	Prairie View	10,000	Forest End; Highway End	

== Major League Cricket grounds ==
Official name	Other names	City or town	Capacity	Ends	Ref.
Broward County Stadium	Central Broward Park	Lauderhill	15,000	North End; Pavilion End	
Church Street Park		Morrisville	3,500	Shiloh Grove North End; South End	
Grand Prairie Stadium	The Ballpark in Grand Prairie	Grand Prairie	7,200		
Knight Riders Cricket Field		Fairplex			
Oakland Coliseum	Milk Bowl; The Black Hole; Baseball's Last Dive Bar	Oakland	12,000		

== Other grounds ==
Official name (known as)	City or town	Capacity	Ends/notes	Ref
The Ditch	Bridgewater	50	Home ground of Ten Broek Premier League	
Belmont Cricket Club Ground	Philadelphia			
Brian Piccolo Park	Cooper City			
Citi Field	New York City	41,922	hosted match of Cricket All-Stars Series 2015	
Dodger Stadium	Los Angeles	56,000	hosted match of Cricket All-Stars Series 2015	
Indianapolis World Sports Park	Indianapolis			
Merion Cricket Club Ground	Haverford			
Germantown Cricket Club Ground	Philadelphia			
Indiana Cricket for Youth Cricket Grounds	Columbus			
Minute Maid Park	Houston	41,574	hosted match of Cricket All-Stars Series 2015	
Philadelphia Cricket Club Ground	Philadelphia			
St George's Cricket Club Ground	New York City			
Leo Magnus Cricket Complex	Los Angeles		Home ground of the Los Angeles Lashings and Los Angeles Cricket	
Church Street Park	Morrisville		Hosted ICC Americas Sub Regional T20 Qualifiers 2018	
Boca Raton Cricket Club Ground	Boca Raton			
MAQ Cricket Stadium	Delray Beach		Home ground of the Houston Hurricanes	
Morgan Hill Outdoor Sports Complex	Morgan Hill		Home ground of the Silicon Valley Strikers	
Santa Clara Cricket Field	Santa Clara		Home ground of the Bay Blazers	
Arroyo Park	Pasadena		Home ground of the Golden State Grizzlies	
Canyonside Park	San Diego		Home ground of the San Diego Surf Riders	
Klahanie Park	Issaquah		Home ground of the Seattle Thunderbolts	
Marymoor Park	Redmond		Home ground of the Seattle Thunderbolts	
BPL Cricket Stadium	Chicago		Home ground of the Chicago Blasters	
Exton Park	West Whiteland Township		Home ground of The Philadelphians	
Washington Park	St. Clair County		Home ground of the Chicago Catchers	
McKinney Cricket Ground	McKinney		Home ground of the Irving Mustangs	
Sandy Lake Cricket Ground	Carrollton		Home ground of the Irving Mustangs	
Canarsie Park	New York		Home ground of the Manhattan Yorkers	
Lyon Oaks Cricket Ground	Wixom		Home ground of the Michigan Cricket Stars	
ACAC Park	St. Louis		Home ground of the St. Louis Americans	
Keney Park Cricket Field	Hartford		Home ground of the New England Eagles	
Idlewild Park	New York		Home ground of the Empire State Titans	
Howe Athletic Complex	Somerset		Home ground of the New Jersey Somerset Cavaliers Cricket Club & New Jersey Stallions	
Veterans Memorial Park, Woodbridge Virginia	Woodbridge		Home ground of the DC Hawks	
Dalton Cricket Field	Dalton		Home ground of the Atlanta Param Veers	
Silverstar Recreation Center	Orlando		Home ground of the Orlando Galaxy	
Dalton Cricket Field	Dalton		Home ground of the Atlanta Param Veers	
