= 2024 Major League Cricket players' draft =

2024 MLC draft

General information
- Sport: Cricket
- Dates: March 21, 2024 and June 18, 2024
- Time: 8 p.m. ET
- Networks: Willow TV; YouTube; Facebook

Overview
- League: Major League Cricket
- Teams: 6

The 2024 Major League Cricket players' draft was held on March 21, 2024, ahead of the 2024 Major League Cricket season. An additional "supplementary" draft was held on June 18, 2024, to complete the squads. Both drafts were held virtually and not broadcast. Recaps of the event were released by the Major League Cricket via their social media platforms.

The draft was conducted over 10 rounds divided on the basis of salary cap, using the "snake" format. Out of the 125 players in the draft list, 20 players were drafted. During the supplementary draft, teams were given 48 hours to strategize before selecting any players. A total of 3 players were ultimately selected.

== Rules ==
The draft is exclusive to domestic players, like the previous season, however teams are able to announce newly signed players during the draft.

Each team were allowed to have a minimum of nine domestic players and maximum of ten, with a mandatory U23 player in their squads. Until all the teams had passed, the draft round continued in the snake format. Each team could draft two players in each level, if they had enough purse available. Teams who had not yet completed their squads were free to do so during the supplementary draft, wherein teams were given 48 hours to strategize before selecting any further players.

== Salary cap ==
The draft had fixed salary caps for each round, with the highest being $75,000 in the first round and the lowest being $5,000 in the Rookie (U23) round.

- First Round – $75,000
- Second Round – $65,000
- Third Round – $60,000
- Fourth Round – $50,000
- Fifth Round – $40,000
- Sixth Round – $35,000
- Seventh Round – $25,000
- Eighth Round – $20,000
- Ninth Round – $15,000
- Tenth Round – $10,000
- Rookie Round – $5,000

== Draft order ==
The draft pick order was based on the reverse order of the teams' finishing positions in the 2023 season standings. Los Angeles Knight Riders had the first pick, if the team did not have enough purse to draft a player, they were automatically passed to the next team.

== Retained players ==
Teams were set a deadline for the end of February 2024 to announce overseas and domestic player retentions for the season, with a maximum of nine overseas slots allowed in each team. Any remaining domestic players would be available to be picked by teams during the main draft.

On February 15, 2024, the retained overseas players' lists were announced. On March 1, 2024, the domestic player retention list was announced.

Retained overseas players for the 2024 Major League Cricket season
Team	Player	Nationality
Los Angeles Knight Riders	Spencer Johnson	Australia
Los Angeles Knight Riders	Sunil Narine	West Indies
Los Angeles Knight Riders	Jason Roy	England
Los Angeles Knight Riders	Andre Russell	West Indies
Los Angeles Knight Riders	Adam Zampa	Australia
MI New York	Trent Boult	New Zealand
MI New York	Dewald Brevis	South Africa
MI New York	Tim David	Australia
MI New York	Rashid Khan	Afghanistan
MI New York	Nicholas Pooran	West Indies
MI New York	Kieron Pollard	West Indies
MI New York	Kagiso Rabada	South Africa
San Francisco Unicorns	Finn Allen	New Zealand
San Francisco Unicorns	Haris Rauf	Pakistan
Seattle Orcas	Heinrich Klaasen	South Africa
Seattle Orcas	Quinton de Kock	South Africa
Seattle Orcas	Wayne Parnell	South Africa
Seattle Orcas	Imad Wasim	Pakistan
Texas Super Kings	Devon Conway	New Zealand
Texas Super Kings	Faf du Plessis	South Africa
Texas Super Kings	Mitchell Santner	New Zealand
Washington Freedom	Akeal Hosein	West Indies
Washington Freedom	Marco Jansen	South Africa

Retained domestic players for the 2024 Major League Cricket season
Team	Player	Salary cap
Los Angeles Knight Riders	Ali Khan	$75,000
Los Angeles Knight Riders	Unmukt Chand	$65,000
Los Angeles Knight Riders	Nitish Kumar	$40,000
Los Angeles Knight Riders	Saif Badar	$15,000
Los Angeles Knight Riders	Shadley van Schalkwyk	$10,000
MI New York	Steven Taylor	$75,000
MI New York	Ehsan Adil	$50,000
MI New York	Nosthush Kenjige	$40,000
MI New York	Monank Patel	$35,000
MI New York	Shayan Jahangir	$15,000
San Francisco Unicorns	Corey Anderson	$75,000
San Francisco Unicorns	Liam Plunkett	$65,000
San Francisco Unicorns	Carmi le Roux	$35,000
San Francisco Unicorns	Brody Couch	$25,000
San Francisco Unicorns	Sanjay Krishnamurthi	$2,500
Seattle Orcas	Harmeet Singh	$75,000
Seattle Orcas	Shehan Jayasuriya	$65,000
Seattle Orcas	Shubham Ranjane	$50,000
Seattle Orcas	Cameron Gannon	$40,000
Seattle Orcas	Nauman Anwar	$25,000
Texas Super Kings	Calvin Savage	$65,000
Texas Super Kings	Milind Kumar	$40,000
Texas Super Kings	Cameron Stevenson	$25,000
Texas Super Kings	Zia Shahzad	$10,000
Texas Super Kings	Saiteja Mukkamalla	$2,500
Texas Super Kings	Mohammad Mohsin	—
Texas Super Kings	Zia-ul-Haq	—
Washington Freedom	Andries Gous	$75,000
Washington Freedom	Mukhtar Ahmed	$65,000
Washington Freedom	Obus Pienaar	$50,000
Washington Freedom	Saurabh Netravalkar	$40,000
Washington Freedom	Justin Dill	$10,000
Washington Freedom	Akhilesh Bodugum	$2,500

== Draft selections ==
=== Domestic draft ===
No players were drafted by the teams in the third, fourth and fifth rounds. So, the 6th pick of the draft was directly made in the sixth round.

First round selections made during the draft
Pick	Player	Team	MiLC Team
1	Adithya Ganesh	LA Knight Riders	Bay Blazers
2	Hassan Khan	San Francisco Unicorns	Chicago Kingsmen
3	Joshua Tromp	Texas Super Kings	Houston Hurricanes

Second round selections made during the draft
Pick	Player	Team	MiLC Team
4	Raj Nannan	Texas Super Kings	The Philadelphians
5	Ruben Clinton	MI New York	SoCal Lashings

Sixth round selections made during the draft
Pick	Player	Team	MiLC Team
6	Hammad Azam	Seattle Orcas	Chicago Kingsmen

Seventh round selections made during the draft
Pick	Player	Team	MiLC Team
7	Ian Holland	Washington Freedom	–
8	Amila Aponso	Washington Freedom	Atlanta Fire

Eighth round selections made during the draft
Pick	Player	Team	MiLC Team
9	Corné Dry	LA Knight Riders	Atlanta Fire
10	Heath Richards	MI New York	Atlanta Lightning

Ninth round selections made during the draft
Pick	Player	Team	MiLC Team
11	Tajinder Singh	San Francisco Unicorns	Chicago Kingsmen
12	Ali Sheikh	Seattle Orcas	Dallas Mustangs

Tenth round selections made during the draft
Pick	Player	Team	MiLC Team
13	Derone Davis	LA Knight Riders	New Jersey Stallions
14	Karima Gore	San Francisco Unicorns	New Jersey Somerset Cavaliers
15	Lahiru Milantha	Washington Freedom	Silicon Valley Strikers
16	Jahmar Hamilton	San Francisco Unicorns	Atlanta Fire

Rookie (U23) round selections made during the draft
Pick	Player	Team	MiLC Team
17	Matthew Tromp	LA Knight Riders	Houston Hurricanes
18	Yasir Mohammad	Washington Freedom	New Jersey Somerset Cavaliers
19	Ayan Desai	Seattle Orcas	SoCal Lashings
20	Rushil Ugarkar	MI New York	Dallas Mustangs

=== Supplementary draft ===
A total of 3 players were selected by teams during the supplementary draft.

Selections made during the supplementary draft
Pick	Player	Team	MiLC Team
1	Chaitanya Bishnoi	LA Knight Riders	Dallas Xforia Giants
2	Aaron Jones	Seattle Orcas	Atlanta Fire
3	Sunny Patel	MI New York	New Jersey Somerset Cavaliers

== Overseas signings ==
The following players were directly signed by teams ahead of the 2024 season.

Overseas signings for the 2024 Major League Cricket season
Player	Nationality	Team	Ref.
Michael Bracewell	New Zealand	Seattle Orcas	
Matthew Short	Australia	San Francisco Unicorns	
Anrich Nortje	South Africa	MI New York	
Romario Shepherd	West Indies	MI New York	
Rachin Ravindra	New Zealand	Washington Freedom	
Steve Smith	Australia	Washington Freedom	
Jake Fraser-McGurk	Australia	San Francisco Unicorns	
Travis Head	Australia	Washington Freedom	
Glenn Maxwell	Australia	Washington Freedom	
Nandre Burger	South Africa	Seattle Orcas	
Lockie Ferguson	New Zealand	Washington Freedom	
Aiden Markram	South Africa	Texas Super Kings	
Lance Morris	Australia	Seattle Orcas	
Nathan Ellis	Australia	Seattle Orcas	
Matt Henry	New Zealand	San Francisco Unicorns	
Ryan Rickelton	South Africa	Seattle Orcas	
Andrew Tye	Australia	Washington Freedom	
Josh Inglis	Australia	San Francisco Unicorns	
Sherfane Rutherford	West Indies	San Francisco Unicorns	
Shakib Al Hasan	Bangladesh	Los Angeles Knight Riders	
Joshua Little	Ireland	Los Angeles Knight Riders	
David Miller	South Africa	Los Angeles Knight Riders	
Naveen-ul-Haq	Afghanistan	Texas Super Kings	
Obed McCoy	West Indies	Seattle Orcas	
Waqar Salamkheil	Afghanistan	Los Angeles Knight Riders	
Abrar Ahmed	Pakistan	San Francisco Unicorns	
Pat Cummins	Australia	San Francisco Unicorns	
Jack Edwards	Australia	Washington Freedom	
Marcus Stoinis	Australia	Texas Super Kings	
Withdrawn players
Daryl Mitchell	New Zealand	Texas Super Kings	
Replacement players
Noor Ahmad	Afghanistan	Texas Super Kings	

== Administration changes ==
Administration changes ahead of the 2024 Major League Cricket season
Team	Name	Change	Role
Washington Freedom	Greg Shipperd	Resigned	Head coach
Washington Freedom	Ricky Ponting	Appointed	Head coach
