= 2025 Major League Cricket players' draft =

2025 MLC draft

General information
- Sport: Cricket
- Date: February 20, 2025
- Time: 8 p.m. ET
- Networks: Willow TV; YouTube; Facebook

Overview
- League: Major League Cricket
- Teams: 6

The 2025 Major League Cricket players' draft was held on February 20, 2025, ahead of the 2025 Major League Cricket season for teams to pick domestic players. Like the previous year, the draft was held virtually and not by broadcast. The results of the draft were released by Major League Cricket via their social media platforms.

The format of the draft was same as the previous season, it was conducted over 10 rounds divided on the basis of salary cap, using the "snake" format. A total of 16 picks were made in the final draft.

== Salary cap ==
The draft had fixed salary caps for each round, with the highest being $75,000 in the first round and the lowest being $10,000 in the tenth round.

- First Round – $75,000
- Second Round – $65,000
- Third Round – $60,000
- Fourth Round – $50,000
- Fifth Round – $40,000
- Sixth Round – $35,000
- Seventh Round – $25,000
- Eighth Round – $20,000
- Ninth Round – $15,000
- Tenth Round – $10,000

== Retained players ==
The retention window for the third season was open till February 13, 2025, and the teams were allowed retain any number of domestic players within this deadline. Ahead of the draft, many teams decided to let go of marquee players like Travis Head, Kagiso Rabada, and Daryl Mitchell. The Freedom had the most retentions with 15 players, while the Orcas had the least retentions with just 7.

Retained overseas players for the 2024 Major League Cricket season
| Player | Nationality |
Los Angeles Knight Riders
| Spencer Johnson | Australia |
| Sunil Narine | West Indies |
| Andre Russell | West Indies |
MI New York
| Trent Boult | New Zealand |
| Rashid Khan | Afghanistan |
| Nicholas Pooran | West Indies |
| Kieron Pollard | West Indies |
San Francisco Unicorns
| Finn Allen | New Zealand |
| Jake Fraser-McGurk | Australia |
| Haris Rauf | Pakistan |
| Matthew Short | Australia |
Seattle Orcas
| Heinrich Klaasen | South Africa |
| Ryan Rickelton | South Africa |
Texas Super Kings
| Devon Conway | New Zealand |
| Faf du Plessis | South Africa |
| Marcus Stoinis | Australia |
| Noor Ahmad | Afghanistan |
Washington Freedom
| Glenn Maxwell | Australia |
| Jack Edwards | Australia |
| Lockie Ferguson | New Zealand |
| Marco Jansen | South Africa |
| Rachin Ravindra | New Zealand |
| Steve Smith | Australia |

Retained domestic players for the 2024 Major League Cricket season
| Player | Salary cap |
Los Angeles Knight Riders
| Adithya Ganesh | $75,000 |
| Ali Khan | $75,000 |
| Unmukt Chand | $65,000 |
| Nitish Kumar | $40,000 |
| Corné Dry | $20,000 |
| Saif Badar | $15,000 |
| Shadley van Schalkwyk | $10,000 |
| Matthew Tromp | $5,000 |
MI New York
| Ehsan Adil | $50,000 |
| Nosthush Kenjige | $40,000 |
| Monank Patel | $35,000 |
| Heath Richards | $20,000 |
| Sunny Patel | $10,000 |
| Rushil Ugarkar | $5,000 |
San Francisco Unicorns
| Corey Anderson | $75,000 |
| Hassan Khan | $75,000 |
| Liam Plunkett | $65,000 |
| Carmi le Roux | $35,000 |
| Brody Couch | $25,000 |
| Karima Gore | $10,000 |
| Sanjay Krishnamurthi | $2,500 |
| Juanoy Drysdale | —N/a |
Seattle Orcas
| Harmeet Singh | $75,000 |
| Cameron Gannon | $40,000 |
| Aaron Jones | $20,000 |
| Ayan Desai | $5,000 |
Texas Super Kings
| Joshua Tromp | $75,000 |
| Calvin Savage | $65,000 |
| Milind Kumar | $40,000 |
| Saiteja Mukkamalla | $2,500 |
| Mohammad Mohsin | —N/a |
| Zia-ul-Haq | —N/a |
Washington Freedom
| Andries Gous | $75,000 |
| Mukhtar Ahmed | $65,000 |
| Obus Pienaar | $50,000 |
| Saurabh Netravalkar | $40,000 |
| Amila Aponso | $25,000 |
| Ian Holland | $25,000 |
| Justin Dill | $10,000 |
| Lahiru Milantha | $10,000 |
| Yasir Mohammad | $5,000 |

== Draft selections ==
=== Domestic draft ===
No players were drafted by the teams in the third, fourth and fifth rounds. So, the 6th pick of the draft was directly made in the sixth round.

First round selections made during the draft
| Pick | Player | Team | MiLC Team |
|---|---|---|---|
| 1 | Jessy Singh | Seattle Orcas | New Jersey Stallions |
| 2 | Shubham Ranjane | Texas Super Kings | Dallas Xforia Giants |

Fourth round selections made during the draft
| Pick | Player | Team | MiLC Team |
|---|---|---|---|
| 3 | Agni Chopra | MI New York | – |
| 4 | Tajinder Singh | MI New York | Chicago Kingsmen |

Fifth round selections made during the draft
| Pick | Player | Team | MiLC Team |
|---|---|---|---|
| 5 | Sujit Nayak | Seattle Orcas | Seattle Thunderbolts |

Seventh round selections made during the draft
| Pick | Player | Team | MiLC Team |
|---|---|---|---|
| 6 | Steven Taylor | Seattle Orcas | Atlanta Fire |

Eighth round selections made during the draft
| Pick | Player | Team | MiLC Team |
|---|---|---|---|
| 7 | Shayan Jahangir | Seattle Orcas | Silicon Valley Strikers |
| 8 | Kunwarjit Singh | MI New York | – |

Ninth round selections made during the draft
| Pick | Player | Team | MiLC Team |
|---|---|---|---|
| 9 | Karthik Gattepalli | LA Knight Riders | Houston Hurricanes |
| 10 | Sharad Lumba | MI New York | – |
| 11 | Stephen Wiig | Texas Super Kings | New Jersey Stallions |

Tenth round selections made during the draft
| Pick | Player | Team | MiLC Team |
|---|---|---|---|
| 12 | Hammad Azam | San Francisco Unicorns | Chicago Kingsmen |
| 13 | Abhishek Paradkar | Washington Freedom | East Bay Blazers |

Rookie (U23) round selections made during the draft
| Pick | Player | Team | MiLC Team |
|---|---|---|---|
| 14 | Rahul Jariwala | Seattle Orcas | Golden State Grizzlies |
| 15 | Adam Khan | Texas Super Kings | Ft. Lauderdale Lions |
| 16 | Achilles Browne | San Francisco Unicorns | Ft. Lauderdale Lions |

== Overseas signings ==
The following players were directly signed by teams ahead of the 2025 season.

Overseas signings for the 2025 Major League Cricket season
| Player | Nationality | Team | Ref. |
| Alex Hales | England | Los Angeles Knight Riders | – |
