= Bay Blazers =

Sacramento-based cricket team in Minor League Cricket

East Bay Blazers
- Bay Blazers
- League: Minor League Cricket
- Conference: Western Division (Pacific Conference)

Personnel
- Captain: Angelo Perera
- Owner: Biju Nair & Vivek Tummalapalli
- Chief executive: Biju Nair

Team information
- City: San Jose, California
- Colours: Dark Blue, and Yellow.
- Founded: 2020; 6 years ago
- Home ground: Santa Clara Cricket Field
T20 kit

The East Bay Blazers (more commonly known as the Bay Blazers) are an American professional Twenty20 cricket team based in the San Francisco Bay Area that competes in Minor League Cricket (MiLC). It was formed in 2020 as part of 24 original teams to compete in Minor League Cricket. The franchise is owned by Biju Nair and Vivek Tummalapalli.

The team's home ground is Santa Clara Cricket Field, located in Santa Clara, California. Former Sri Lankan cricketer Angelo Perera currently helms captaincy duties, while American international Sanjay Krishnamurthi helms vice-captaincy duties.

South African cricketer David White and American international Sanjay Krishnamurthi currently lead the batting and bowling leaderboards with 1,001 runs and 29 wickets respectively.

== Franchise history ==
=== Background ===
Talks of an American Twenty20 league started in November 2018 just before USA Cricket became the new governing body of cricket in the United States. In May 2021, USA Cricket announced they had accepted a bid by American Cricket Enterprises (ACE) for a US$1 billion investment covering the league and other investments benefitting the U.S. national teams.

In an Annual General Meeting on February 21, 2020, it was announced that USA Cricket was planning to launch Major League Cricket in 2021 and Minor League Cricket that summer, but it was delayed due to the COVID-19 pandemic and due to the lack of high-quality cricket stadiums in the USA. Major League Cricket was pushed to a summer-2023 launch and Minor League Cricket was pushed back to July 31, 2021.

USA Cricket CEO Iain Higgins also pointed out cities such as New York City, Houston and Los Angeles with a large cricket fanbase, and targeted them among others as launch cities for Minor League Cricket.

=== Exhibition league ===
In July 2020, the player registration for the Minor League Cricket exhibition league began. On August 15, 2020, USA Cricket announced the teams participating in the exhibition league matches, also listing the owners for each team. The draft for the exhibition league began on August 22, 2020, with the Bay Blazers releasing their squad on August 24. Rusty Theron was later named as captain for the Bay Blazers for the exhibition league.

=== 2021 season ===
After the conclusion of the exhibition league, USA Cricket announced that they were planning to launch the inaugural season of Minor League Cricket in spring 2021. Ahead of the official season, which was announced to kick off on July 31, the Grizzlies announced David White as captain with Rusty Theron helming vice-captain duties.

Throughout the group stage, the Blazers lost to the Strikers, the Grizzlies twice, and the Stars once, but won against the Catchers once, and the Blasters, the Lashings, the Surf Riders, and the Seattle Thunderbolts twice. The Blazers finished 3rd at the end of the group stage, thus not qualifying for the finals.

=== 2022 season ===
Ahead of the 2022 season, Major League Cricket announced that the draft for that season would take place on May 12. Ahead of the official season, it was announced that former Sri Lankan cricketer Angelo Perera and American international Sanjay Krishnamurthi would replace David White and Rusty Theron as captain and vice-captain respectively throughout the season.

Throughout the season, the Blazers lost once against the Mustangs, won once and lost once against the Strikers and the Thunderbolts, won once against the Lashings, Blasters and the Lone Star Athletics, and won twice against the Blasters, Grizzlies, and the Surf Riders. The Blazers finished third overall in their division, marginally missing out on the play-offs to the Seattle Thunderbolts due to an inferior net run rate (NRR).

== Current squad ==
- Players with international caps are listed in **bold**.

Name	Nationality	Birth date	Batting style	Bowling style	Year signed	Notes
Batsmen
Arshdeep Brar	United States	21 April 2002 (age 24)	Right-handed	Right-arm off break	2021	
Navanpreet Brar	United States	8 June 2003 (age 23)	Right-handed	Right-arm leg break	2022	
**David Bunn**	South Africa	9 April 1992 (age 34)	Left-handed	Slow left-arm orthodox	2021	Overseas
**Nawaz Khan**	Afghanistan	29 October 1995 (age 31)	Right-handed	Right-arm fast medium	2021	Overseas
Mark Deyal	Trinidad and Tobago	7 April 1993 (age 33)	Left-handed	Right-arm off break	2022	Overseas
**Kieran Powell**	Saint Kitts and Nevis	6 March 1990 (age 36)	Left-handed	Right-arm medium Right-arm off break	2022	Overseas
Vikash Mohan	Trinidad and Tobago	22 September 1994 (age 32)	Right-handed	Right-arm off break	2022	Overseas
Kuldeep Singh	India	26 October 1978 (age 48)	Left-handed	Slow left-arm orthodox	2021	Overseas
All-rounders
**Angelo Perera**	Sri Lanka	23 February 1990 (age 36)	Right-handed	Slow left-arm orthodox	2022	Overseas captain
**David White**	South Africa	22 May 1991 (age 35)	Right-handed	Right-arm medium fast	2021	Overseas
**Sanjay Krishnamurthi**	United States	2 June 2003 (age 23)	Right-handed	Slow left-arm orthodox	2021	Vice-captain
Srinivas Mohan	United States	17 July 2001 (age 25)	Right-handed	Right-arm fast medium	2021	
Jahron Alfred	Trinidad and Tobago	22 May 1991 (age 35)	Right-handed	Right-arm fast	2022	Overseas
Prumjot Panesar	United States	3 January 2001 (age 25)	Right-handed	Right-arm off break	2022	
Aarnav Iyer	United States	11 October 2002 (age 24)	Right-handed	Right-arm medium	2022	
Bowlers
**Rusty Theron**	United States	24 July 1985 (age 41)	Right-handed	Right-arm medium fast	2021	
Carmi le Roux	South Africa	30 March 1993 (age 33)	Right-handed	Left-arm medium fast	2022	
Shashank Vittaladevaram	United States	2 April 2001 (age 25)	Right-handed	Right-arm leg break googly	2022	
Mohammad Tariq	United States	26 June 1998 (age 28)	Right-handed	Right-arm fast	2022	
Wicket-keepers
Saideep Ganesh	United States	21 February 2001 (age 25)	Right-handed		2022	
