= Chicago Tigers (cricket) =

Chicago-based cricket team in Minor League Cricket

- League: Minor League Cricket
- Conference: Central Division (Pacific Conference)

Personnel
- Captain: Calvin Savage
- Owner: Raiders Unlimited
- Chief executive: Vishal Shah

Team information
- City: Chicago, Illinois
- Colours: Orange, and Black.
- Founded: 2022; 4 years ago
- Home ground: Hanover Park
- Capacity: 2,000

History
- Notable players: Calvin Savage; Marques Ackerman; Saad Ali; Sami Sohail
- Official website: chicagotigerscricket.com
T20 kit

The Chicago Tigers are an American professional Twenty20 cricket team based in the Chicago metropolitan area that competes in Minor League Cricket (MiLC). It was formed in 2022 as part of 3 new teams to play in the 2022 Minor League Cricket season. The franchise is owned by Raiders Unlimited.

The team's home ground is Hanover Park, located near Chicago. Ex-South African cricketers Calvin Savage and Marques Ackerman helm captaincy and vice-captaincy duties respectively.

Saad Ali and Sami Sohail currently top the bowling and batting leaderboards with 405 runs and 22 wickets respectively.

== Franchise history ==
=== Background ===
Talks of an American Twenty20 league formed in November 2018, before USA Cricket became the new governing body of cricket in the United States. In May 2021, USA Cricket announced that they had accepted a bid by American Cricket Enterprises (ACE) for a US$1 billion investment covering the league and other investments benefiting the U.S. national teams.

In an Annual General Meeting on February 21, 2020, it was announced that USA Cricket was planning to launch Major League Cricket in 2021 and Minor League Cricket that summer, but it was delayed due to the COVID-19 pandemic and due to the lack of high-quality cricket stadiums in the USA. Major League Cricket was pushed to a summer-2023 launch and Minor League Cricket was pushed back to July 31, 2021.

In 2020, MLC launched the Chicago Catchers, the predecessor cricket team to the Chicago Tigers. The Catchers performed poorly during the inaugural season of Minor League Cricket, which thus forced MLC to terminate the Catchers after the season ended amid internal issues within the franchise.

Following the termination of the Catchers, MLC announced the formation of the Tigers in May 2022, ahead of the 2022 Minor League Cricket season draft. It was later announced that the Tigers was owned by Raiders Unlimited, which was owned by sports enthusiast and business entrepreneur Vishal Shah.

=== 2022 season ===
Ahead of the 2022 season, Major League Cricket announced that the draft for that season would take place on May 12. Ahead of the official season, it was announced that Calvin Savage and Marques Ackerman would helm captaincy and vice-captaincy duties throughout the season.

Throughout the season, the Tigers lost to the Strikers and Lashings once, won once and lost once against the Athletics, Mustangs, and Americans, won once against the Surf Riders, and won twice against the Blasters. The Tigers finished second in their group, and advanced to the quarter-finals, wherein they lost to the Strikers 2-1 in a best-of-three series.

== Statistics ==
=== Most runs ===
Player	Innings	Runs
Saad Ali	13	405
Marques Ackerman	16	316
Karan Kumar	13	297
Calvin Savage	13	272
Charan Sai Teja	12	209

Source: CricClubs, Last updated: 9 January 2023

=== Most wickets ===
Player	Matches	Wickets
Sami Sohail	16	22
Calvin Savage	13	17
Ranadeep Aleti	16	15
Pruthvish Patel	16	14
Deepchand Pinnaka	7	7

Source: CricClubs, Last updated: 9 January 2023

== See also ==
- Major League Cricket
- Minor League Cricket
- 2021 Minor League Cricket season
- 2021 Minor League Cricket season final
- Minor League Cricket teams
