= Chicago Kingsmen =

Chicago-based cricket team in Minor League Cricket

- League: Minor League Cricket
- Conference: Central Division (Pacific Conference)

Personnel
- Captain: Hammad Azam
- Coach: Aamir Saddique
- Owner: FKS Group

Team information
- City: Chicago, Illinois
- Colours: Black and red
- Founded: 2020; 6 years ago
- Home ground: Moosa Stadium

History
- MiLC wins: 2 (2024, 2026)
T20 kit

The Chicago Kingsmen (formerly the Chicago Blasters) are an American professional Twenty20 cricket team based in Chicago, Illinois, that competes in Minor League Cricket (MiLC). It was formed in 2020 as part of 24 original teams to compete in Minor League Cricket. The franchise was owned by Iftekhar Shareef until the team's acquisition by Fawad Sarwar of the Kingsmen Global Sports Group. The franchise is currently run by Salman Abbasi and Mohammad Iqra Farooqui, with Khurram Syed also associated.

The team's planned home ground is Kingsmen Stadium, located in Illinois. Pakistan international Fawad Alam helms captaincy duties, while former Pakistani cricketer Saad Ali stands by as vice-captain.

== Franchise history ==
=== Background ===
Talks of an American Twenty20 league started in November 2018 just before USA Cricket became the new governing body of cricket in the United States. In May 2021, USA Cricket announced they had accepted a bid by American Cricket Enterprises (ACE) for a US$1 billion investment covering the league and other investments benefitting the U.S. national teams.

In an Annual General Meeting on February 21, 2020, it was announced that USA Cricket was planning to launch Major League Cricket in 2021 and Minor League Cricket that summer, but it was delayed due to the COVID-19 pandemic and due to the lack of high-quality cricket stadiums in the USA. Major League Cricket was pushed to a summer-2023 launch and Minor League Cricket was pushed back to July 31, 2021.

USA Cricket CEO Iain Higgins also pointed out cities such as New York City, Houston and Los Angeles with a large cricket fanbase, and targeted them among others as launch cities for Minor League Cricket.

=== Exhibition league ===
In July 2020, the player registration for the Minor League Cricket exhibition league began. On August 15, 2020, USA Cricket announced the teams participating in the exhibition league matches, also listing the owners for each team. The draft for the exhibition league began on August 22, 2020, with the Chicago Blasters releasing their squad on September 12. Ibrahim Khaleel was later named as captain for the Blasters, with Fahad Babar down for vice-captaincy duties for the exhibition league.

=== 2021 season ===
After the conclusion of the exhibition league, USA Cricket announced that they were planning to launch the inaugural season of Minor League Cricket in spring 2021. Ahead of the official season, which was announced to kick off on July 31, the Blasters announced Fahad Babar as captain with Abul Hasan helming vice-captain duties.

Throughout the group stage, the Blasters won against the Athletics once, the Catchers twice, and the Americans once. However, the Blasters lost once against the Strikers, the Grizzlies and the Americans, while losing twice to the Mustangs, the Hurricanes, and the Stars. The Blasters finished 6th in their group, thus not advancing to the play-offs.

=== 2022 season ===
Ahead of the 2022 season, Major League Cricket announced that the draft for that season would take place on May 12. Ahead of the official season, it was announced that the captaincy role would be shifted from Khaleel to local Blasters cricketer Ashhar Medhi, with Babar once again given vice-captaincy duties.

Throughout the season, the Blasters lost to the Tigers, Hurricanes, and the Stars twice, and lost to the Blazers, the Blasters, the Grizzlies, the Mustangs, and the Americans once. The Blasters finished last in their group, despite three of their games being washed out.

== Current squad ==
- Players with international caps are listed in **bold**.

Name	Nationality	Birth date	Batting style	Bowling style	Year signed	Notes
Batsmen
**Awais Zia**	Pakistan	1 September 1986 (age 40)	Left-handed	Right-arm off break	2022	Overseas
Homayoon Ahmadzai	United States	18 July 1993 (age 33)	Right-handed	Right-arm off break	2021	
Shreyas Ramesh	United States	12 November 1988 (age 38)	Right-handed	Right-arm medium	2022	
Jay Patel	United States	30 January 1996 (age 30)	Right-handed	Right-arm medium fast	2022	
Najam Iqbal	United States	10 August 1988 (age 38)	Left-handed	Right-arm off break	2021	
All-rounders
**Abul Hasan**	Bangladesh	5 August 1992 (age 34)	Left-handed	Right-arm medium fast	2021	Overseas
Mohit Patel	United States	29 May 2003 (age 23)	Right-handed	Right-arm medium fast	2022	
Abdullah Quadri	United States	15 July 2000 (age 26)	Right-handed	Left-arm fast medium	2022	
Pankaj Kampli	United States	22 June 1983 (age 43)	Right-handed	Right-arm leg break googly	2022	
Chiranjeevi Akunuri	United States	16 June 1993 (age 33)	Right-handed	Right-arm medium	2022	
**Fahad Babar**	United States	19 February 1992 (age 34)	Right-handed	Right-arm off break	2021	Vice-captain
Ankush Agrawal	United States	21 February 1990 (age 36)	Right-handed	Right-arm fast	2022	
Datta Prakash Yadavalli	United States	27 February 1992 (age 34)	Left-handed	Left-arm off break	2021	
Abir Chippa	United States	11 August 1987 (age 39)	Right-handed	Left-arm off break	2022	
Arjun Reddy	United States	26 April 2004 (age 22)	Right-handed	Right-arm fast	2022	
Bowlers
Mohammad Mohsin	United States	15 April 1996 (age 30)	Right-handed	Right-arm off break	2025	
Umair Mir	Pakistan	27 January 1990 (age 36)	Left-handed	Right-arm medium fast	2022	
Zia-ul-Haq	Pakistan	11 December 1994 (age 31)	Right-handed	Left-arm fast medium	2022	
Kevin Philip	United States	1 February 2006 (age 20)	Right-handed	Right-arm leg spin	2022	
Sai Daggupati	United States	21 May 1995 (age 31)	Right-handed	Right-arm leg spin	2022	
Wicket-keepers
Aayush Thakkar	United States	17 July 2004 (age 22)	Right-handed	Right-arm medium fast	2022	
Shaheer Hassan	United States	23 February 1994 (age 32)	Right-handed	Right-arm fast medium	2021	
Ashhar Mehdi	United States	13 September 1975 (age 51)	Right-handed	Right-arm off break	2021	Captain

== Honors ==
- Minor League Cricket Champions (2): 2024, 2026
