= Lone Star Athletics =

Austin-based cricket team in Minor League Cricket

- League: Minor League Cricket
- Conference: Central Division (Pacific Conference)

Personnel
- Captain: Sidhesh Pathare
- Coach: Vijay Patel
- Owner: Manish Patel and partners

Team information
- City: Houston, Texas
- Colours: Dark Blue, and Gold.
- Founded: 2020; 6 years ago
- Home ground: Moosa Stadium
- Capacity: 2,500
T20 kit

The Lone Star Athletics (previously the Austin Athletics) are an American professional Twenty20 cricket team based in the Greater Houston area that competes in Minor League Cricket (MiLC). It was formed in 2020 as part of 24 original teams to compete in Minor League Cricket. The franchise is owned by Manish Patel and partners.

The team's home ground is Moosa Stadium, located in Pearland, Texas. Team captain Sidhesh Pathare helms captaincy duties, while Shayan Jahangir stands by as vice-captain.

Captain Nitish Kumar and American cricketer Laksh Parikh lead the bowling and batting leaderboards with 407 runs and 20 wickets respectively.

== Franchise history ==
=== Background ===
Talks of an American Twenty20 league started in November 2018 just before USA Cricket became the new governing body of cricket in the United States. In May 2021, USA Cricket announced they had accepted a bid by American Cricket Enterprises (ACE) for a US$1 billion investment covering the league and other investments benefitting the U.S. national teams.

In an Annual General Meeting on February 21, 2020, it was announced that USA Cricket was planning to launch Major League Cricket in 2021 and Minor League Cricket that summer, but it was delayed due to the COVID-19 pandemic and due to the lack of high-quality cricket stadiums in the USA. Major League Cricket was pushed to a summer-2023 launch and Minor League Cricket was pushed back to July 31, 2021.

USA Cricket CEO Iain Higgins also pointed out cities such as New York City, Houston and Los Angeles with a large cricket fanbase, and targeted them among others as launch cities for Minor League Cricket.

=== Exhibition league ===
In July 2020, the player registration for the Minor League Cricket exhibition league began. On August 15, 2020, USA Cricket announced the teams participating in the exhibition league matches, also listing the owners for each team. The draft for the exhibition league began on August 22, 2020, with the Lone Star Athletics releasing their squad on August 24. Willem Ludick was later named as captain for the Lone Star Athletics for the exhibition league.

=== 2021 season ===
After the conclusion of the exhibition league, USA Cricket announced that they were planning to launch the inaugural season of Minor League Cricket in spring 2021. Ahead of the official season, which was announced to kick off on July 31, the Athletics announced Sidhesh Pathare as captain with Shayan Jahangir helming vice-captain duties.

Throughout the group stage, the Athletics won twice against the Catchers, the Mustangs, the Stars, and the Americans, but they won once against the Master Blasters, the Lashings, the Surf Riders, and the Hurricanes. However, the Athletics lost twice against the Chicago Blasters and the Hurricanes. The Athletics' good performance in the group stage allowed for them to proceed to the quarter-finals.

In the quarter-finals, the Athletics were matched up with eventual title winners, Silicon Valley Strikers. However, the Athletics lost to the Strikers in a best-of-three-game series 2–1.

=== 2022 season ===
Ahead of the 2022 season, Major League Cricket announced that it was renaming the Austin Athletics to the Lone Star Athletics. MLC also announced that the draft for that season would take place on May 12.

== Current squad ==
- Players with international caps are listed in **bold**.

Name	Nationality	Birth date	Batting style	Bowling style	Year signed	Notes
Batsmen
**Derval Green**	Jamaica	4 December 1998 (age 27)	Right-handed	Right-arm medium fast	2021	Overseas
**Jahmar Hamilton**	Anguilla	22 September 1990 (age 36)	Right-handed	Right-arm medium	2021	Overseas
**Jannisar Khan**	United States	6 October 1981 (age 45)	Right-handed	Right-arm medium	2021	
**Awais Zia**	Pakistan	1 September 1986 (age 40)	Left-handed	Right-arm off break	2021	Overseas
All-rounders
Ahmed Butt	Pakistan	7 March 1991 (age 35)	Left-handed	Slow left-arm orthodox	2021	Overseas
Hamza Bangash	United States	16 August 1981 (age 45)	Right-handed	Right-arm medium	2021	
Hamza Khalid	United States	10 September 1993 (age 33)	Right-handed	Right-arm off break	2021	
Jay Desai	India	30 January 1987 (age 39)	Right-handed	Right-arm off break	2021	Overseas
**Nitish Kumar**	Canada	21 May 1994 (age 32)	Right-handed	Right-arm off break	2021	Overseas captain
Preyas Bhakta	United States	15 February 1991 (age 35)	Right-handed	Right-arm leg break googly	2021	
Rishab Patil	United States	17 April 2001 (age 25)	Right-handed	Right-arm fast medium	2021	
Safiullah Faheem	United States	10 August 1992 (age 34)	Right-handed	Right-arm medium	2021	
Sidhesh Pathare	United States	20 August 1986 (age 40)	Right-handed	Right-arm medium fast	2021	
**William Perkins**	Trinidad and Tobago	8 October 1986 (age 40)	Right-handed	Right-arm medium fast	2021	Overseas vice-captain
Bowlers
Naqash Basharat	Pakistan	4 April 1992 (age 34)	Left-handed	Left-arm medium	2024	
Jagrit Raj	United States	19 September 1987 (age 39)	Right-handed	Right-arm fast medium	2021	
Laksh Parikh	United States	10 August 2003 (age 23)	Left-handed	Left-arm Medium Fast	2021	
Wicket-keepers
Shayan Jahangir	Pakistan	24 December 1994 (age 31)	Right-handed	Right-arm medium fast	2021	Overseas
