= San Ramon Grizzlies =

Bay Area based cricket team in Minor League Cricket

- League: Minor League Cricket
- Conference: Western Division (Pacific Conference)

Personnel
- Captain: Rahul Jariwala
- Coach: Jagadeesh Arunkumar
- Owner: Samir Shah
- Chief executive: Samir Shah

Team information
- City: San Ramon, California
- Colours: Red, and Gold.
- Founded: 2020; 6 years ago
- Home ground: Arroyo Park, Davis
- Official website: http://grizzlies.us
T20 kit

The San Ramon Grizzlies (formerly the Golden State Grizzlies) are an American professional Twenty20 cricket team based in San Ramon that competes in Minor League Cricket (MiLC). It was formed in 2020 as part of 24 original teams to compete in Minor League Cricket.

On Aug 26th 2025, Grizzlies welcomed Turing AI, a Silicon Valley-based technology Unicorn as their title sponsor for the 2025 Minor League Cricket season

The team's home ground is Arroyo Park, located in Davis. The team is led by Rahul Jariwala and coached by Jagadeesh Arunkumar. The team changed their name from the Golden State to the San Ramon Grizzlies in June 2025, ahead of that year's tournament.

== Franchise history ==
=== Background ===
Talks of an American Twenty20 league started in November 2018 just before USA Cricket became the new governing body of cricket in the United States. In May 2021, USA Cricket announced they had accepted a bid by American Cricket Enterprises (ACE) for a US$1 billion investment covering the league and other investments benefitting the U.S. national teams.

In an Annual General Meeting on February 21, 2020, it was announced that USA Cricket was planning to launch Major League Cricket in 2021 and Minor League Cricket that summer, but it was delayed due to the COVID-19 pandemic and due to the lack of high-quality cricket stadiums in the USA. Major League Cricket was pushed to a summer-2023 launch and Minor League Cricket was pushed back to July 31, 2021.

USA Cricket CEO Iain Higgins also pointed out cities such as New York City, Houston and Los Angeles with a large cricket fanbase, and targeted them among others as launch cities for Minor League Cricket.

=== 2020 ===
In July 2020, the player registration for the Minor League Cricket exhibition league began. On August 15, 2020, USA Cricket announced the teams participating in the exhibition league matches, also listing the owners for each team. The draft for the exhibition league began on August 22, 2020, with the Grizzlies releasing their squad on August 24. Saurabh Netravalkar was later named as captain.

=== 2021-2024 ===
After the conclusion of the exhibition league, USA Cricket announced that they were planning to launch the inaugural season of Minor League Cricket in spring 2021. Ahead of the official season, which was announced to kick off on July 31, the Grizzlies announced Sami Aslam as captain with Hammad Azam helming vice-captain duties.

Throughout the group stage, the Grizzlies lost to the Strikers twice, and won twice against the Blazers, the Blasters, the Lashings, the Surf Riders, and the Thunderbolts. The Grizzlies additionally won against the Chicago Blasters and the Americans once. (Note: This reference covers everything up to Week 7 of Minor League Cricket. Please do not replace this reference.) The Grizzlies topped the group, thus qualifying for the play-offs. In the quarterfinals, the Grizzlies bested the Houston Hurricanes in a best-of-three-game series 2–0. The Grizzlies headed to the semi-finals to face eventual winners, the Silicon Valley Strikers. The Grizzlies lost by 33 runs against the Strikers as they placed 3rd in the tournament.

=== 2025 ===
In May, the Grizzlies were taken over by Samir Shah, who was then appointed the team's CEO. The team also hired former Karnataka batter J. Arunkumar as head coach, before striking a deal with the San Ramon Cricket Association (SRCA) and the city of San Ramon to move their operations into the region.

== Current squad ==
- Players with international caps are listed in **bold**.

Name	Nationality	Birth date	Batting style	Bowling style	Year signed	Notes
Batsmen
Aditya Srinivas	United States	19 August 1991 (age 35)	Right-handed	Right-arm fast medium	2021	
**Hammad Azam**	Pakistan	16 March 1991 (age 35)	Right-handed	Right-arm medium	2021	Overseas
Zia Shahzad	Pakistan	18 June 1996 (age 30)	Right-handed	Right-arm leg break googly	2021	Overseas
All-rounders
Abbas Jafri	United States	15 December 1992 (age 33)	Right-handed	Right-arm off break	2021	
Abheyender Singh	United States	21 September 1987 (age 39)	Left-handed	Slow left-arm orthodox	2021	
Asad Khan	Afghanistan	6 December 1997 (age 28)	Right-handed	Right-arm off break	2021	Overseas
Bhavesh Jain	India	22 June 1982 (age 44)	Left-handed	Left-arm medium	2021	Overseas
Karan Chandel	United States	27 January 1991 (age 35)	Right-handed	Right-arm medium fast	2021	
Junaid Malik	Pakistan	25 April 1990 (age 36)	Left-handed	Right-arm off break	2021	Overseas
Mohit Nataraj	United States	28 May 1985 (age 41)	Right-handed	Right-arm off break	2021	
Neeraj Goel	United States	17 March 1991 (age 35)	Right-handed	Right-arm fast medium	2021	
**Sami Aslam**	Pakistan	12 December 1995 (age 30)	Left-handed	Right-arm medium	2021	Overseas captain
Samson Bhatti	United States	29 June 1990 (age 36)	Right-handed	Right-arm fast medium	2021	
Sheryar Khan	Pakistan	11 April 1986 (age 40)	Right-handed	Left-arm medium	2021	Overseas
Shivam Mishra	India	30 August 1992 (age 34)	Right-handed	Right-arm medium fast	2021	Overseas
**Vatsal Vaghela**	United States	20 March 2002 (age 24)	Left-handed	Slow left-arm orthodox	2021	
Wicket-keepers
Saideep Ganesh	United States	16 May 1997 (age 29)	Right-handed	Right-arm off break	2021	
