= San Diego Surf Riders =

Minor League Cricket team in San Diego, California

- League: Minor League Cricket (MiLC)
- Conference: Western Division (Pacific Conference)

Personnel
- Captain: Marty Kain
- Owner: Rajinder Ghai
- Chief executive: Gangaram Singh; Sanjit Menezes; Jimmy Ankelsaria; Ram Madabushi

Team information
- City: San Diego, California
- Colours: Light Blue, and Yellow.
- Founded: 2020; 6 years ago
- Home ground: Canyonside Park, San Diego
T20 kit

The San Diego Surf Riders are an American professional Twenty20 cricket team based in San Diego, California, that competes in Minor League Cricket (MiLC). The team's home ground is Canyonside Park, located in the community of Rancho Peñasquitos. The Surf Riders began play in the 2021 season.

== Franchise history ==
The Surf Riders were formed in 2020 as part of 24 original teams to compete in Minor League Cricket. The team is co-owned by Rajinder Ghai, Gangaram Singh, Sanjit Menezes, Jimmy Anklesaria, and Ram Madabushi.

=== Background ===
Talks of an American Twenty20 league started in November 2018 just before USA Cricket became the new governing body of cricket in the United States. In May 2021, USA Cricket announced they had accepted a bid by American Cricket Enterprises (ACE) for a US$1 billion investment covering the league and other investments benefitting the U.S. national teams.

In an Annual General Meeting on February 21, 2020, it was announced that USA Cricket was planning to launch Major League Cricket in 2021 and Minor League Cricket that summer, but it was delayed due to the COVID-19 pandemic and due to the lack of high-quality cricket stadiums in the USA. Major League Cricket was pushed to a summer-2023 launch and Minor League Cricket was pushed back to July 31, 2021.

USA Cricket CEO Iain Higgins also pointed out cities such as New York City, Houston and Los Angeles with a large cricket fanbase, and targeted them among others as launch cities for Minor League Cricket.

=== Exhibition league ===
In July 2020, the player registration for the Minor League Cricket exhibition league began. On August 15, 2020, USA Cricket announced the teams participating in the exhibition league matches, also listing the owners for each team. The draft for the exhibition league began on August 22, 2020, with the Surf Riders releasing their squad on August 24. Marty Kain was later named as captain for the Surf Riders for the exhibition league.

=== 2021 season ===
After the conclusion of the exhibition league, USA Cricket announced that they were planning to launch the inaugural season of Minor League Cricket in spring 2021. Ahead of the official season, which was announced to kick off on July 31, the Lashings announced Marty Kain to continue his role as captain with Mrunal Patel helming vice-captain duties.

In their first match of the season, the Surf Riders defeated the Master Blasters by 5 wickets in a low-scoring game, but then lost to the Lashings by 4 wickets the same day. The Surf Riders, however, only won three times after their opening match victory, once against the Thunderbolts, once against the Master Blasters, and once against the Irving Mustangs. They lost against the Thunderbolts, the Strikers twice, the Blazers twice, the Lashings, Hurricanes, and the Athletics. The Surf Riders finished on top of the Master Blasters, and finished 6th, thus not qualifying for the finals.

=== 2022 season ===
Ahead of the 2022 season, Major League Cricket announced that the draft for that season would take place on May 12.

== Current squad ==
Marty Kain is helming captaincy duties, with American cricketer Mrunal Patel helming vice-captain duties. Americans Sri Krishna A and Timil Patel lead the batting and bowling leaderboards for the team, with 344 runs and 18 wickets.

- Players with international caps are listed in **bold**.

Name	Nationality	Birth date	Batting style	Bowling style	Year signed	Notes
Batsmen
**Marty Kain**	United States	16 May 1988 (age 38)	Left-handed	Slow left-arm orthodox	2021	
Sri Krishna	India	13 June 1990 (age 36)	Right-handed	Right-arm fast medium	2021	Overseas
All-rounders
Abhinay Reddy	United States	8 June 1991 (age 35)	Right-handed	Right-arm medium fast	2021	
Adnesh Tondale	United States	17 January 2002 (age 24)	Right-handed	Right-arm medium fast	2021	
Ajay Sharma	United States	19 September 1982 (age 44)	Right-handed	Slow left-arm orthodox	2021	
Ayan Desai	United States	3 April 2002 (age 24)	Right-handed	Right-arm fast medium	2021	
Brynley Richards	Australia	1 February 1991 (age 35)	Right-handed	Right-arm medium	2021	Overseas
Devam Shrivastava	United States	9 August 2004 (age 22)	Right-handed	Right-arm off break	2021	
**Dillon Heyliger**	Canada	21 October 1989 (age 37)	Right-handed	Right-arm medium	2021	Overseas
Jaideep Reddy	United States	13 April 1987 (age 39)	Right-handed	Right-arm medium	2021	
**Mrunal Patel**	United States	28 October 1986 (age 40)	Left-handed	Slow left-arm orthodox	2021	
Mohammad Sadiq	Pakistan	9 September 1981 (age 45)	Right-handed	Right-arm leg break	2021	Overseas
**Ravi Timbawala**	United States	8 June 1989 (age 37)	Right-handed	Right-arm medium	2021	
**Timil Patel**	United States	1 December 1983 (age 42)	Right-handed	Right-arm leg break	2021	
Zubair Murad	United States	11 June 1986 (age 40)	Right-handed	Right-arm fast medium	2021	
Wicket-keepers
Siddarth Matani	United States	3 June 1990 (age 36)	Right-handed	Right-arm off break	2021	
