= Hollywood Master Blasters =

Los Angeles-based cricket team in Minor League Cricket

- League: Minor League Cricket
- Conference: Western Division (Pacific Conference)

Personnel
- Captain: Nisarg Patel
- Owner: Janak Patel

Team information
- City: Los Angeles, California
- Colours: Dark Blue, and Yellow.
- Founded: 2020; 6 years ago
- Dissolved: 2023
- Home ground: Leo Magnus Cricket Complex
- Capacity: 5,000
T20 kit

The Hollywood Master Blasters was an American professional Twenty20 cricket franchise that competed in Minor League Cricket (MiLC) till the 2022 season. The team was based in Los Angeles, California. It was formed in 2020 as part of 24 original teams to compete in Minor League Cricket. The franchise is owned by Janak Patel.

The team's home ground was the Leo Magnus Cricket Complex, located in Van Nuys, California. American veteran Nisarg Patel helms captaincy duties, with South African cricketer Cody Chetty standing by as vice-captain.

Cody Chetty and Venukalyan Madireddy top the batting and bowling leaderboards with 470 runs and 13 wickets respectively.

== Franchise history ==
=== Background ===
Talks of an American Twenty20 league started in November 2018 just before USA Cricket became the new governing body of cricket in the United States. In May 2021, USA Cricket announced they had accepted a bid by American Cricket Enterprises (ACE) for a US$1 billion investment covering the league and other investments benefitting the U.S. national teams.

In an Annual General Meeting on February 21, 2020, it was announced that USA Cricket was planning to launch Major League Cricket in 2021 and Minor League Cricket that summer, but it was delayed due to the COVID-19 pandemic and due to the lack of high-quality cricket stadiums in the USA. Major League Cricket was pushed to a summer-2023 launch and Minor League Cricket was pushed back to July 31, 2021.

USA Cricket CEO Iain Higgins also pointed out cities such as New York City, Houston and Los Angeles with a large cricket fanbase, and targeted them among others as launch cities for Minor League Cricket.

=== Exhibition league ===
In July 2020, the player registration for the Minor League Cricket exhibition league began. On August 15, 2020, USA Cricket announced the teams participating in the exhibition league matches, also listing the owners for each team. The draft for the exhibition league began on August 22, 2020, with the Hollywood Master Blasters releasing their squad on August 24. Amitoze Singh was later named as captain for the Hollywood Master Blasters for the exhibition league. However, the Blasters didn't play a single game due to COVID-19 restrictions.

=== 2021 season ===
After the conclusion of the exhibition league, USA Cricket announced that they were planning to launch the inaugural season of Minor League Cricket in spring 2021. Ahead of the official season, which was announced to kick off on July 31, the Lashings announced Nisarg Patel as captain with Cody Chetty helming vice-captain duties.

In their first match of the season, the Blasters lost by 5 wickets to the Surf Riders. The Blasters only won twice throughout the league, once against the Strikers, and once against the Lashings. They lost against the Grizzlies twice, the Strikers, the Thunderbolts twice, the Blazers twice, the Surf Riders, the Lashings, the Hurricanes, the Athletics, and the Mustangs. The Blasters finished off with 2 wins and 13 losses, finishing bottom of the table in their group, thus missing the play-offs.

=== 2022 season ===
Ahead of the 2022 season, Major League Cricket announced that the draft for that season would take place on May 12. This was also the final season for the Franchise.

== Current squad ==
- Players with international caps are listed in **bold**.

Name	Nationality	Birth date	Batting style	Bowling style	Year signed	Notes
Batsmen
Aaroh Rawat	United States	17 April 1996 (age 30)	Right-handed	Right-arm fast medium	2021	
**Basanta Regmi**	Nepal	6 April 1986 (age 40)	Left-handed	Slow left-arm orthodox	2021	Overseas
**Cody Chetty**	South Africa	28 June 1991 (age 35)	Right-handed	Right-arm off break	2021	Overseas
**Kanishka Chaugai**	United States	24 January 1986 (age 40)	Right-handed	Right-arm medium	2021	
**Prithu Baskota**	Nepal	5 July 1992 (age 34)	Right-handed	Right-arm off break	2021	Overseas
Pukar Patel	United States	15 July 1992 (age 34)	Right-handed	Right-arm fast medium	2021	
**Shehan Fernando**	Sri Lanka	14 April 1993 (age 33)	Right-handed	Right-arm off break	2021	Overseas
All-rounders
Ajay Immadi	United States	10 March 1990 (age 36)	Right-handed	Right-arm off break	2021	
**Khalid Khan**	Hong Kong	7 February 1971 (age 55)	Right-handed	Right-arm medium fast	2021	Overseas
**Nisarg Patel**	United States	20 April 1988 (age 38)	Right-handed	Slow left-arm orthodox	2021	
Dhyan Ranatunga	Sri Lanka	1 June 1989 (age 37)	Right-handed	Left-arm medium fast	2021	Overseas
Jignesh Patel	India	3 January 1987 (age 39)	Right-handed	Left-arm medium	2021	Overseas
Karan Viradiya	India	17 October 1994 (age 31)	Right-handed	Right-arm off break	2021	Overseas
Venukalyan Madireddy	United States	14 November 1992 (age 33)	Right-handed	Right-arm fast	2021	
Bowlers
Amitoze Singh	India	14 February 1989 (age 37)	Right-handed	Right-arm medium	2021	Overseas
Wicket-keepers
Samarth Jaydev	United States	3 June 1991 (age 35)	Right-handed	Right-arm leg break	2021	

== See also ==
- 2021 Minor League Cricket season
- 2021 Minor League Cricket season squads
- 2021 Minor League Cricket season final
