= All Stars Dallas =

Dallas-based American cricket team

- Kings XI Dallas
- League: Minor League Cricket
- Conference: Pacific Conference

Team information
- City: Dallas, Texas
- 2026 Minor League Cricket season

The All Stars Dallas (formerly the Kings XI Dallas) are an American Twenty20 cricket team based in Dallas, Texas, that competes in Minor League Cricket (MiLC). The team competes in the Central Division of the Pacific Conference.

The team was rebranded as All Stars Dallas ahead of the 2026 Minor League Cricket season following a change in ownership.
