= New England Eagles =

New England-based cricket team in Minor League Cricket

- League: Minor League Cricket
- Conference: Eastern Division (Atlantic Conference)

Personnel
- Captain: Assad Fudadin

Team information
- City: Boston
- Colours: Navy, and Green.
- Founded: 2020; 6 years ago
- Home ground: Keney Park Cricket Field, Hartford, Connecticut
T20 kit

The New England Eagles are an American professional Twenty20 cricket team based in Connecticut that competes in Minor League Cricket (MiLC). It was formed in 2020 as part of 24 original teams to compete in MiLC.

The team's home ground is Keney Park, Hartford, Connecticut. Assad Fudadin is the team's captain.

== Franchise history ==
=== Background ===
Talks of an American Twenty20 league started in November 2018, just before USA Cricket became the new governing body of cricket in the United States. In May 2021, USA Cricket announced they had accepted a bid by American Cricket Enterprises (ACE) for a US$1 billion investment covering the league and other investments benefitting the U.S. national teams.

In an annual general meeting on February 21, 2020, it was announced that USA Cricket was planning to launch Major League Cricket in 2021 and Minor League Cricket that summer, but it was delayed due to the COVID-19 pandemic and due to the lack of high-quality cricket stadiums in the USA. Major League Cricket was pushed to a summer 2023 launch and Minor League Cricket was pushed back to July 31, 2021. USA Cricket CEO Iain Higgins also pointed out cities such as New York City, Houston and Los Angeles with a large cricket fan base, and targeted them among others as launch cities for Minor League Cricket.

=== Exhibition league ===
In July 2020, the player registration for the Minor League Cricket exhibition league began. On August 15, 2020, USA Cricket announced the teams participating in the exhibition league matches, also listing the owners for each team. The draft for the exhibition league began on August 22, 2020, with the New England Eagles releasing their squad on August 24. TBA was later named as captain for the New England Eagles in the exhibition league.

=== 2021 season ===
After the conclusion of the exhibition league, USA Cricket announced that they were planning to launch the inaugural season of Minor League Cricket in spring 2021. Ahead of the official season, which was announced to kick off on July 31, they announced Assad Fudadin as captain and Justin Dill as vice-captain.

=== 2022 season ===
Ahead of the 2022 season, Major League Cricket announced that the draft for that season would take place on May 12.

2026 season

Ahead of the 2026 season, New England Eagles changed ownership and is now led by a group of technology veterans who have dedicated many years to help advance cricket in the US, starting from the grassroot levels.
