= New Jersey Stallions (cricket) =

New Jersey-based cricket team in Minor League Cricket

- League: Minor League Cricket
- Conference: Eastern Division (Atlantic Conference)

Personnel
- Captain: Jasdeep Singh
- Owner: Venu Palaparthi
- Chief executive: Ravikumar Suri

Team information
- City: Somerset, New Jersey
- Colours: Purple, and Red.
- Founded: 2020; 6 years ago
- Home ground: Howe Athletic Complex, New Jersey
T20 kit

The New Jersey Stallions are an American professional Twenty20 cricket team based in Somerset, New Jersey, that competes in Minor League Cricket (MiLC). It was formed in 2020 as part of 24 original teams to compete in Minor League Cricket. The team is co-owned by businessmen Venu Palaparthi and Ravikumar Suri.

The team's home ground is Howe Athletics Complex in Somerset. Jasdeep Singh took the helm as captain, with ex-South African player Justin Dill the vice-captain.

Americans Saiteja Mukkamala and Stephen Wiig lead the batting and bowling leaderboards for the team with 367 runs and 27 wickets.

== Franchise history ==
=== Background ===
Talks of an American Twenty20 league started in November 2018 just before USA Cricket became the new governing body of cricket in the United States. In May 2021, USA Cricket announced they had accepted a bid by American Cricket Enterprises (ACE) for a US$1 billion investment covering the league and other investments benefitting the U.S. national teams.

In an Annual General Meeting on February 21, 2020, it was announced that USA Cricket was planning to launch Major League Cricket in 2021 and Minor League Cricket that summer, but it was delayed due to the COVID-19 pandemic and due to the lack of high-quality cricket stadiums in the USA. Major League Cricket was pushed to a summer-2023 launch and Minor League Cricket was pushed back to July 31, 2021.

USA Cricket CEO Iain Higgins also pointed out cities such as New York City, Houston and Los Angeles with a large cricket fanbase, and targeted them among others as launch cities for Minor League Cricket.

=== Exhibition league ===
In July 2020, the player registration for the Minor League Cricket exhibition league began. On August 15, 2020, USA Cricket announced the teams participating in the exhibition league matches, also listing the owners for each team. The draft for the exhibition league began on August 22, 2020, with the New Jersey Stallions releasing their squad on August 24. Nikhil Dutta was later named as captain for the New Jersey Stallions in the exhibition league.

=== 2021 season ===
After the conclusion of the exhibition league, USA Cricket announced that they were planning to launch the inaugural season of Minor League Cricket in spring 2021. Ahead of the official season, which was announced to kick off on July 31, they announced Jasdeep Singh as captain and Justin Dill as vice-captain.

In their first match of the season, they defeated the Morrisville Cardinals by 20 runs, and also defeated the Param Veers by 83 runs the following day. They then went on to win against the Titans twice, the Philadelphians, the Hawks, the Yorkers, the Cavaliers twice, and the Eagles twice. They additionally lost against the Hawks, the Yorkers, the Galaxy, and the Ft. Lauderdale Lions. The Stallions topped the group, and qualified for the quarter-finals.

In the quarterfinals, the Stallions swept the Cardinals 2–0 in a best-of-three series, thus qualifying them for the semifinals. In the semifinals, the Stallions faced the Titans, and defeated them by five wickets. In the finals, the Silicon Valley Strikers beat the Stallions by six wickets in a thriller to take home the trophy.

=== 2022 season ===
Ahead of the 2022 season, Major League Cricket announced that the draft for that season would take place on May 12.

== Current squad ==
- Players with international caps are listed in **bold**.

Name	Nationality	Birth date	Batting style	Bowling style	Year signed	Notes
Batsmen
Mukhtar Ahmed	United States	20 December 1992 (age 33)	Left-handed	Slow left-arm orthodox	2025	
Preet Shah	United States	20 January 1996 (age 30)	Right-handed	Right-arm medium	2021	
**Rovman Powell**	Jamaica	23 July 1993 (age 33)	Right-handed	Right-arm medium fast	2021	Overseas
**Sachin Mylavarapu**	Singapore	21 June 1991 (age 35)	Right-handed	Slow left-arm orthodox	2021	Overseas
All-rounders
Anirudh Immanuel	United States	23 September 2004 (age 22)	Right-handed	Right-arm leg spin	2021	
Daniel Williams	England	10 December 1981 (age 44)	Right-handed	Right-arm medium fast	2021	Overseas
**Dominique Rikhi**	United States	20 March 1993 (age 33)	Right-handed	Right-arm off break	2021	
**Jasdeep Singh**	United States	10 February 1993 (age 33)	Right-handed	Right-arm medium	2021	Captain
Jon-Ross Campbell	Jamaica	9 July 1990 (age 36)	Right-handed	Right-arm off break	2021	Overseas
**Justin Dill**	South Africa	10 December 1994 (age 31)	Right-handed	Right-arm medium	2021	Overseas vice-captain
Karan Patel	India	30 September 1994 (age 32)	Right-handed	Right-arm off break	2021	Overseas
Laxman Nyamagouda	United States	19 August 1985 (age 41)	Right-handed	Right-arm medium	2021	
Raymond Ramrattan	United States	10 July 2000 (age 26)	Right-handed	Right-arm leg break googly	2021	
Ritvik Bansal	United States	8 December 1998 (age 27)	Right-handed	Right-arm medium	2021	
Arjun Vajjalla	United States	3 September 2003 (age 23)	Right-handed	Right-arm medium	2021	
Stephen Wiig	United States	11 February 1998 (age 28)	Right-handed	Right-arm medium fast	2021	
Varun Mantha	United States	29 June 2004 (age 22)	Left-handed	Left-arm medium fast	2021	
Viraj Desai	United States	25 January 1988 (age 38)	Right-handed	Right-arm medium	2021	
Wicket-keepers
Saiteja Mukkamalla	United States	9 April 2004 (age 22)	Right-handed	Right-arm off break	2021	

== See also ==
- 2021 Minor League Cricket season
