= Baltimore Royals =

Washington DC-based cricket team in Minor League Cricket

- League: Minor League Cricket
- Conference: Eastern Division (Atlantic Conference)

Personnel
- Captain: Sunny Sohal
- Owner: Rajit Passey

Team information
- City: Baltimore, Maryland
- Colours: Orange, and Dark Orange.
- Founded: 2020; 6 years ago
- Home ground: Veterans Memorial Park
T20 kit

The Baltimore Royals (formerly the DC Hawks) are an American professional Twenty20 cricket team based in the Washington metropolitan area that competes in Minor League Cricket (MiLC). It was formed in 2020 as part of 24 original teams to compete in Minor League Cricket. The franchise is currently owned by Rajit Passey.

The team's home ground is Veterans Memorial Park, located in Woodbridge, Virginia. American international Sunny Sohal currently helms as captain, with former IPL cricketer Bipul Sharma standing by as vice-captain.

Ravi Inder Singh tops the batting leaderboard for the team with 564 runs, while Sarabjit Ladda tops the bowling team with 29 wickets.

== Franchise history ==
=== Background ===
The logo for the then-DC Hawks

Talks of an American Twenty20 league started in November 2018 just before USA Cricket became the new governing body of cricket in the United States. In May 2021, USA Cricket announced they had accepted a bid by American Cricket Enterprises (ACE) for a US$1 billion investment covering the league and other investments benefitting the U.S. national teams.

In an Annual General Meeting on February 21, 2020, it was announced that USA Cricket was planning to launch Major League Cricket in 2021 and Minor League Cricket that summer, but it was delayed due to the COVID-19 pandemic and due to the lack of high-quality cricket stadiums in the USA. Major League Cricket was pushed to a summer-2023 launch and Minor League Cricket was pushed back to July 31, 2021.

USA Cricket CEO Iain Higgins also pointed out cities such as New York City, Houston and Los Angeles with a large cricket fanbase, and targeted them among others as launch cities for Minor League Cricket.

=== Exhibition league ===
In July 2020, the player registration for the Minor League Cricket exhibition league began. On August 15, 2020, USA Cricket announced the teams participating in the exhibition league matches, also listing the owners for each team. The draft for the exhibition league began on August 22, 2020, with the DC Hawks releasing their squad on September 2. Navin Stewart was later named as captain for the DC Hawks in the exhibition league.

=== 2021 season ===
After the conclusion of the exhibition league, USA Cricket announced that they were planning to launch the inaugural season of Minor League Cricket in spring 2021. Ahead of the official season, which was announced to kick off on July 31, they announced Sunny Sohal as captain and Adil Bhatti as vice-captain.

In their first match of the season, they beat the Florida Beamers by 65 runs, but lost to the New England Eagles by 33 runs the same day. They then went on to win against the Philadelphians, the Eagles twice, the Titans, the Stallions, the Yorkers, and the Cavaliers. They additionally lost against the Philadelphians, the Titans, the Stallions, the Yorkers, the Cavaliers, the Fire, and the Param Veers.

The Hawks placed 4th in their group, thus missing the quarter-finals.

=== 2022 season ===
Ahead of the 2022 season, Major League Cricket announced that the draft for that season would take place on May 12. Ahead of the official season, it was announced that American international Sunny Sohal would continue to captain the team, with former IPL cricketer Bipul Sharma taking over the role of vice-captain following Adil Bhatti's departure to the Empire State Titans.

Throughout the season, the Hawks lost twice against the Stallions, the Titans, and the Yorkers, lost once against the runners-up Atlanta Fire, won once and lost once against the Eagles and the Philadelphians, won once against the Lions, and won twice against the Cavaliers. Overall, the Hawks ended with a 5-9 win-loss record, securing them fifth in their division and unable to go to the play-offs.

=== 2023 season ===
Before the start of the 2023 season, it was announced that the DC Hawks would undergo a name-change to the Baltimore Royals.

== Current squad ==
- Players with international caps are listed in **bold**.

| Name | Nationality | Birth date | Batting style | Bowling style | Year signed | Notes |
Batsmen
| Abdullah Ghazi | United Arab Emirates | 18 May 1988 (age 38) | Right-handed | Right-arm medium fast | 2021 | Overseas |
| Franklin Clement | United States | 21 April 1993 (age 33) | Right-handed | Right-arm medium | 2021 | |
| **Ritwik Behera** | United States | 10 November 2003 (age 23) | Right-handed | Right-arm off break | 2021 | |
| Shehan Perera | Sri Lanka | 11 February 1987 (age 39) | Right-handed | Right-arm off break | 2021 | Overseas |
| **Sunny Sohal** | United States | 10 November 1987 (age 39) | Right-handed | Right-arm leg break | 2021 | Captain |
| Talal Zia | Pakistan | 25 March 1986 (age 40) | Right-handed | Right-arm medium | 2021 | Overseas |
All-rounders
| **Shukri Rahim** | Malaysia | 6 October 1986 (age 40) | Right-handed | Right-arm off break | 2021 | Overseas |
| **Adil Bhatti** | United States | 28 October 1984 (age 42) | Right-handed | Right-arm medium | 2021 | Vice-captain |
| **Dane Piedt** | South Africa | 6 March 1990 (age 36) | Right-handed | Right-arm off break | 2021 | Overseas |
| Ishan Sharma | United States | 17 May 2003 (age 23) | Right-handed | Right-arm fast medium | 2021 | |
| **Naseer Islam** | United States | 23 September 1972 (age 54) | Right-handed | Right-arm medium fast | 2021 | |
| Rasesh Behera | United States | 30 August 2001 (age 25) | Right-handed | Right-arm medium | 2021 | |
| Ravi Inder Singh | India | 4 December 1987 (age 38) | Left-handed | Right-arm off break | 2021 | Overseas |
| Raviteja Reddy | United States | 11 February 1993 (age 33) | Right-handed | Right-arm leg break | 2021 | |
| Sahil Kapoor | United States | 11 August 1986 (age 40) | Right-handed | Right-arm medium fast | 2021 | |
| Waleed Karimullah | United States | 8 June 1993 (age 33) | Right-handed | Right-arm medium | 2021 | |
Bowlers
| Hassan Khan | United States | 16 October 1998 (age 28) | Right-handed | Right-arm medium fast | 2025 | |
Wicket-keepers
| Christopher van Tull | United States | 5 October 1986 (age 40) | Right-handed | Right-arm fast | 2021 | |

== See also ==
- 2021 Minor League Cricket season
