= Moosa Stadium =

Cricket stadium in Texas, U.S

Smart Choice Moosa Stadium
- Smart Choice Stadium
- Rendering of the enhancements being made by Major League Cricket.
- Interactive map of Smart Choice Moosa Stadium

Ground information
- Location: Pearland, Texas
- Country: United States
- Coordinates: 29.51768°N 95.32565°W
- Establishment: 2015; 11 years ago
- Capacity: 2,500
- Owner: Smart Choice; USA Cricket
- Operator: American College Cricket
- Tenants: American College Cricket; United States national cricket team
- End names
- Pearland End; Massey Ranch End

International information
- First men's ODI: May 28 2022: United States v Scotland
- Last men's ODI: June 15 2022: United States v Nepal
- As of June 15 2022; Source: Cricinfo

Smart Choice Moosa Stadium is a cricket stadium in Pearland, Texas. The stadium is owned by Smart Choice, a former sponsor of the United States national cricket team. It is named after Smart Choice CEO Sakhi Muhammad’s father. It is home to American College Cricket.

== Main Event Field ==
=== Cricket ===
In April 2015, it was announced that Canada cricket team would travel to Houston to play three warm-up matches against an invitational XI ahead of the ICC Americas Division One T20 tournament.

From July to September 2021, the stadium was used as the Austin Athletics' home ground for Minor League Cricket.

In March 2022, Major League Cricket announced that it was planning investments to enhance the stadium, and that the venue would bid as a possible venue for the 2024 ICC Men's T20 World Cup. In April 2022, USA Cricket announced that the stadium would be the second ODI-accredited venue, following the Central Broward Park in Broward County, Florida, pending approval from the International Cricket Council later the following month. The stadium was then slated to host 12 ODIs that would be part of the Cricket World Cup League Two over May and June 2022.

== List of centuries ==
=== One Day International centuries ===
The following table summarizes the One Day International (ODI) centuries scored at the site.

No.	Score	Player	Team	Balls	Inns.	Opposing team	Date	Result
1	107*	Richie Berrington	Scotland	90	1	United States	May 29, 2022	Won
2	108*	Kyle Coetzer	Scotland	142	2	United Arab Emirates	May 31, 2022	Won
3	102*	Vriitya Aravind	United Arab Emirates	108	2	United States	June 4, 2022	Won
4	111	Sushant Modani	United States	133	1	Oman	June 8, 2022	Won
5	130	Monank Patel	United States	101	1	Oman	June 8, 2022	Won
6	104*	Zeeshan Maqsood	Oman	126	1	Nepal	June 9, 2022	Won
7	114	Steven Taylor	United States	123	2	Nepal	June 11, 2022	Draw
8	103	Kashyap Prajapati	Oman	115	1	United States	June 12, 2022	Won

== International five-wicket hauls ==
The following table summarizes the international five-wicket hauls taken here at the site.

Five-wicket hauls in One Day International cricket at Moosa Stadium
No.	Bowler	Date	Team	Opposing Team	Inn	O	R	W	Result
1	Saurabh Netravalkar	May 28, 2022	United States	Scotland	2	10	45	5	Won
2	Ali Khan	June 8, 2022	United States	Oman	2	8.3	20	5	Won
3	Karan KC	June 9, 2022	Nepal	Oman	1	10	38	5	Lost
4	Karan KC	June 14, 2022	Nepal	Oman	1	9	33	5	Won
