= Sanjay Krishnamurthi =

American cricketer (born 2003)

Personal information
- Born: June 2, 2003 (age 23); Corvallis, Oregon, United States
- Batting: Right-handed
- Bowling: Slow left arm orthodox
- Role: All-rounder

International information
- National side: United States
- ODI debut (cap 35): September 13, 2021 v Nepal
- Last ODI: June 12, 2026 v Canada
- T20I debut (cap 45): February 20, 2025 v Oman
- Last T20I: February 15, 2026 v Namibia

Domestic team information
- Years: Team
- 2021–present: Bay Blazers (squad no. 57)
- 2023–present: San Francisco Unicorns (squad no. 69)

Career statistics
Competition	ODI	T20I	LA	T20
Matches	22	13	22	73
Runs scored	348	196	348	1,187
Batting average	23.20	32.66	23.20	23.27
100s/50s	0/2	0/1	0/2	0/5
Top score	61	68*	61	92
Balls bowled	124	30	124	48
Wickets	4	2	4	2
Bowling average	22.50	10.50	22.50	24.00
5 wickets in innings	0	0	0	0
10 wickets in match	0	0	0	0
Best bowling	3/10	2/13	3/10	2/13
Catches/stumpings	13/–	8/–	13/–	28/–
- Source: Cricinfo, September 25, 2026

Sanjay Prasad Krishnamurthi (born June 2, 2003) is an American cricketer who plays for the United States cricket team. In June 2021, he was selected to take part in the Minor League Cricket tournament in the United States following the players' draft. In September 2021, Krishnamurthi was named as a reserve player in the United States' One Day International (ODI) squad for the rescheduled tri-series in Oman. Following an injury to team-mate Aaron Jones, Krishnamurthi was added to the main ODI squad for the tour. He made his ODI debut on 13 September 2021, for the United States against Nepal.

On July 8, 2024, Krishnamurthi made his T20 debut playing for the San Francisco Unicorns against the Los Angeles Knight Riders. On July 22, 2024, Krishnamurthi played a match winning innings of 79* off 42 balls during a chase of 177 against the Washington Freedom.

He is currently attending San Jose State University, pursuing a degree in computer science.
