= Calvin Savage =

South African American cricketer

Personal information
- Full name: Calvin Peter Savage
- Born: 4 January 1993 (age 33); Durban, Natal Province, South Africa
- Nickname: Twigles
- Batting: Right-handed
- Bowling: Right-arm fast
- Role: All-rounder

Domestic team information
- Years: Team
- 2009/10–2011/12: KwaZulu-Natal Inland
- 2012/13–2019/20: KwaZulu-Natal
- 2012/13–2018/19: Dolphins
- 2018: Jozi Stars
- 2019/20: KwaZulu-Natal Inland
- 2020/21: Cape Cobras
- 2024–2025: Texas Super Kings

Career statistics
Competition	FC	LA	T20
Matches	69	52	39
Runs scored	2,343	1,114	372
Batting average	26.93	29.31	24.80
100s/50s	2/13	1/5	0/2
Top score	104*	108	53*
Balls bowled	8,507	1,955	383
Wickets	179	64	16
Bowling average	24.42	26.25	31.06
5 wickets in innings	5	0	0
10 wickets in match	0	0	0
Best bowling	5/38	4/23	4/33
Catches/stumpings	59/–	20/–	20/–
- Source: ESPNcricinfo, 15 July 2025

Calvin Peter Savage (born 4 January 1993) is a South African American cricketer who plays as an all-rounder for the Texas Super Kings in Major League Cricket. Born in South Africa, Savage moved to the United States in April 2021 on a three-year deal, where he played in the MLC feeder league, Minor League Cricket. He previously played for KwaZulu-Natal Inland and KwaZulu-Natal in the CSA 4-Day Domestic Series tournament.

As a child, Savage attended Westville Senior Primary School and Maritzburg College, where he played cricket for his college. In August 2017, he was named in Benoni Zalmi's squad for the first season of the now-cancelled T20 Global League. That same year, he was named the leading run-scorer in the 2017–18 CSA Provincial One-Day Challenge tournament for KwaZulu-Natal, with 263 runs in four matches.

In September 2018, he was named in KwaZulu-Natal's squad for the 2018 Africa T20 Cup. The following month, he was named in Jozi Stars' squad for the first edition of the Mzansi Super League T20 tournament. In September 2019, he was named as the captain of KwaZulu-Natal's squad for the 2019–20 CSA Provincial T20 Cup.

After moving to the U.S., Savage played for the Michigan Cricket Stars in Minor League Cricket's inaugural tournament. The following season, he captained the Chicago Tigers to the playoffs in the league's second year. In March 2023, Savage was drafted in Round 2 by the Texas Super Kings to play in the inaugural tournament of Major League Cricket.
