= Leo Magnus Cricket Complex =

Cricket ground

Sepulveda Basin Cricket Fields
- Woodley Cricket Fields
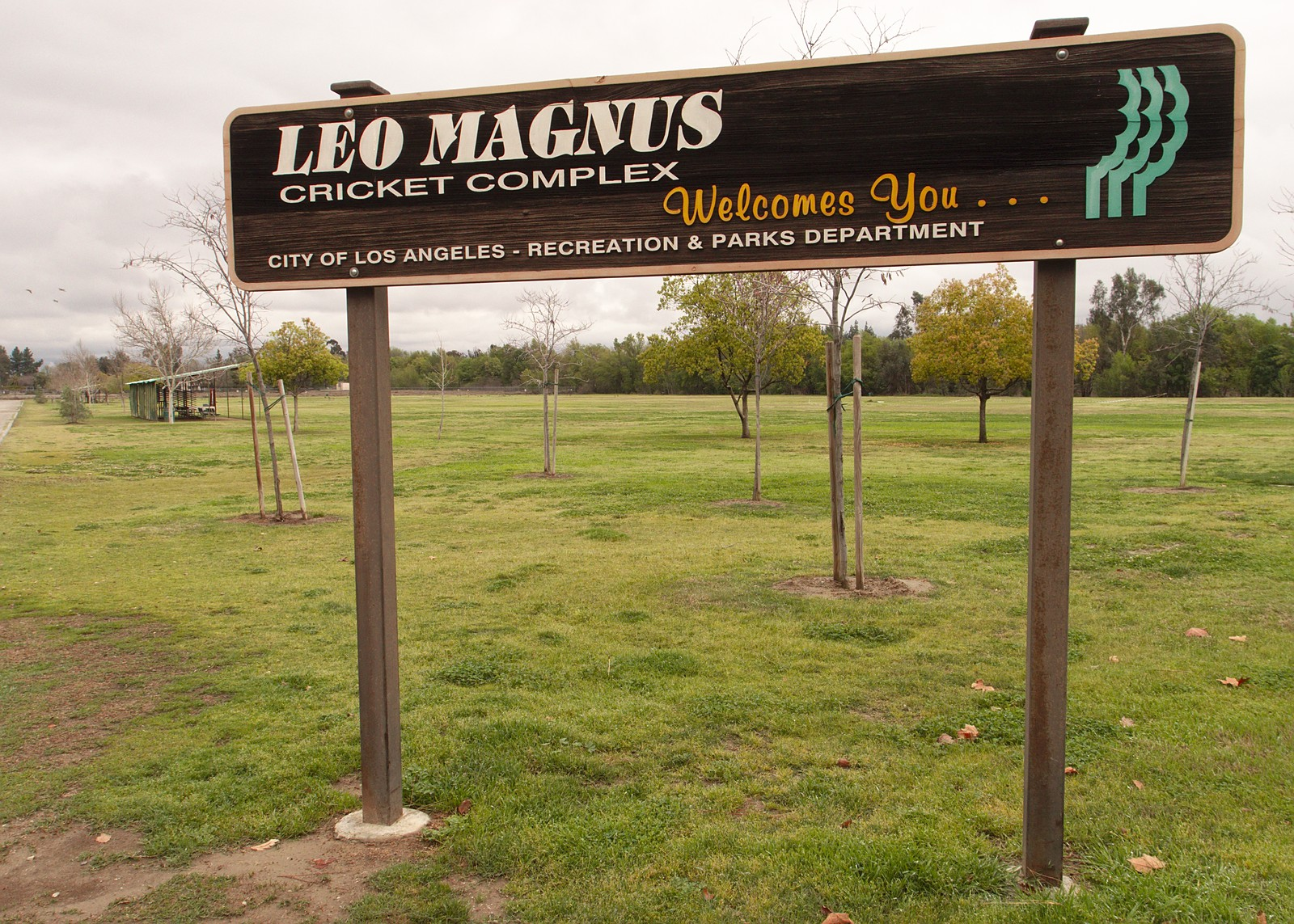
- Sepulveda Basin Cricket Fields (Woodley Park)
- Interactive map of Sepulveda Basin Cricket Fields

Ground information
- Location: Van Nuys, Los Angeles, California
- Country: United States
- Coordinates: 34°10′53.14″N 118°28′32.36″W
- Establishment: 1980; 46 years ago
- Capacity: 5,000
- Owner: Army Corps of Engineers
- Operator: City of Los Angeles Dept. of Recreation and Parks
- Tenants: Southern California Cricket Association, Los Angeles Lashings, Los Angeles Cricket
- End names
- North End; South End

International information
- First women's T20I: September 4 2023: United States v Argentina
- Last women's T20I: September 11 2023: United States v Canada

Team information
Southern California Cricket Association
Los Angeles Lashings
Los Angeles Cricket
- As of September 11, 2023; Source: Cricinfo

The Leo Magnus Cricket Complex (LMCC) or Sepulveda Basin Cricket Fields, aka Woodley Park, is a group of five cricket grounds located in the Van Nuys neighborhood of Los Angeles, California, United States. The facility is also called Woodley Cricket Field(s) or Woodley Cricket Complex due to its location in Woodley Park.

== History ==
The cricket complex is named after Leo "Jingles" Magnus, a Jamaican cricketer who also played for the University Cricket Club and coached the Compton Cricket Club (formerly the Los Angeles Krickets) and the Sheenaway Serendipity Cricket Club. It first opened in 1975.

In 1978, the Glendale Equestrian Center took over the Burbank-area Griffith Park Cricket Association grounds, which had been home to L.A. cricket via the Hollywood Cricket Club since 1933. An active West Indian cricket community obtained land in the Sepulveda Basin in 1977 and two fields at Woodley opened in 1980 (named the Clifford Severn and Ernie Wright grounds), with two more added in 1996 (the Jean Wong and John Marder grounds (now under Los Angeles Cricket's, a 501 (c)(3), guardianship), both named for former Southern California Cricket Association presidents). The complex has a small stand, which can seat 50, and a clubhouse with bathrooms.

In 1997, Woodley hosted the Jamaican team (featuring Jimmy Adams and Franklyn Rose) and in 1999 hosted a List A match between an India A side (with VVS Laxman) against an Australia A side (with Brett Lee, Adam Gilchrist, and Andrew Symonds), which attracted a crowd of 5,000. In the 2000s, Twenty20 cricket became popular and Southern California Cricket Association President Vehman Reddy helped bring the Trinidad and Tobago side and Punjabi Blues to L.A. for three annual tournaments. The complex is frequently used for United States of America Cricket Association trials. The first American College Cricket west-coast regional championship took place at Woodley in 2010. The American Cricket Federation hosted its first Twenty20 tournament at Woodley in 2012.

In 2016 the International Cricket Council (ICC) held the World Cricket League Division Four tournament at the LMCC. This was the first time an ICC WCL divisional event had been played in the United States. The U.S. won the tournament by beating Oman in the Final and both were promoted to Division Three. Mick Jagger of the Rolling Stones stopped by to watch one of the U.S. matches.
