= Shadley van Schalkwyk =

American cricketer (born 1988)

Personal information
- Full name: Shadley Claude van Schalkwyk
- Born: August 5, 1988 (age 38); Cape Town, Cape Province, South Africa
- Batting: Left-handed
- Bowling: Right-arm medium
- Role: All-rounder

International information
- National side: United States
- ODI debut (cap 46): 13 August 2024 v Canada
- Last ODI: 27 May 2025 v Oman
- T20I debut (cap 34): 7 April 2024 v Canada
- Last T20I: 15 February 2026 v Namibia

Domestic team information
- Years: Team
- 2007–2009: Western Province
- 2008–2019: Knights
- 2008–2020: Free State
- 2021–2023: Seattle Thunderbolts
- 2023–present: Los Angeles Knight Riders
- 2026: Dambulla Sixers

Career statistics
Competition	ODI	T20I	FC	LA
Matches	13	18	97	124
Runs scored	167	107	2,593	1,113
Batting average	20.87	21.40	23.15	17.95
100s/50s	0/1	0/0	0/12	0/1
Top score	58	18	86	58
Balls bowled	552	357	13,212	4,851
Wickets	17	28	239	161
Bowling average	32.35	18.32	28.06	26.33
5 wickets in innings	0	0	5	4
10 wickets in match	0	0	0	0
Best bowling	4/20	4/25	7/82	5/19
Catches/stumpings	6/–	5/–	63/–	49/–
- Source: Cricinfo, 15 February 2026

Shadley Claude van Schalkwyk (/vən ˈskɒlkveɪk/, vən SKOLK-vayk; born August 5, 1988) is a cricketer who plays for Major League Cricket franchise Los Angeles Knight Riders, and the United States national cricket team. He is a left-handed batsman and a right-arm medium-fast bowler and has played cricket for Seattle Thunderbolts and Free State. Born in South Africa, he represents the United States at international levels.

== Early life and education ==
Van Schalkwyk was born on August 5, 1988, in Cape Town, Cape Province, South Africa. He studied at Wynberg Boys' High School. His first cricketing appearances came for Wynberg Boys' High School in a tour of Pakistan at the beginning of the 2006–07 season, playing against various Pakistani schools.

== Domestic career ==
Van Schalkwyk made his List A debut in February 2008, scoring a steady 17 runs from the lower order, finishing not out. He made one further List A appearance during the season. He represented South Africa Academy at the Academy Cup competition of 2007–08, and made two List A appearances for Western Province.

Moving to The Knights for the 2008/2009, he has played 5 List A Matches for the amateur Free State side, and 1 First-class match for The Knights itself. He was included in the Free State cricket team squad for the 2015 Africa T20 Cup.

Shadley spent the English summer playing as a professional for St Annes Cricket Club in the Northern Premier Cricket League. With the bat he scored 676 runs at 33.8, but it was with the ball he shone. He took 62 wickets at an average of 13.26 with his best bowling figures of 7/42 coming in a 45 run local derby victory at Vernon Road on 11 June against Blackpool CC, after contributing 57 with the bat.

In August 2017, he was named in Nelson Mandela Bay Stars' squad for the first season of the T20 Global League. However, in October 2017, Cricket South Africa initially postponed the tournament until November 2018, with it being cancelled soon after.

In September 2018, he was named in Free State's squad for the 2018 Africa T20 Cup. In September 2019, he was named in Free State's squad for the 2019–20 CSA Provincial T20 Cup.

In June 2021, van Schalkwyk was named in the Minor League Cricket team for the Seattle Thunderbolts. In March 2023, he was drafted by Los Angeles Knight Riders to play in Major League Cricket.

== International career ==
In March 2024, he was named in the United States' squad for their Twenty20 International (T20I) series against Canada. He made his T20I debut for USA on April 7, 2024, against Canada.

In January 2026, van Schalkwyk was named in USA's squad for the 2026 T20 World Cup. He began the tournament with a breakthrough spell against India at the Wankhede Stadium, where he claimed four wickets for 25 runs. In the next match against Pakistan national team in Colombo, he recorded the same figures of 4/25 in 4 overs, emerging as one of the rising stars for USA.
