= Los Angeles Lashings =

Los Angeles-based Professional Cricket Organization

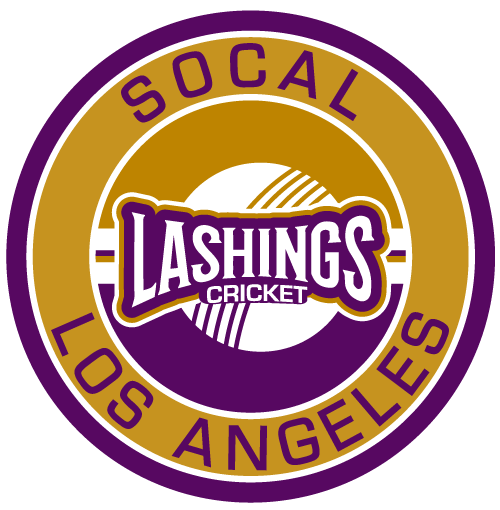
- League: Minor League Cricket
- Conference: Western Division (Pacific Conference)

Personnel
- Captain: Dale Phillips
- Owner: Abhimanyu Rajp; Deepak Gosain

Team information
- City: Los Angeles, California
- Colours: Purple, and Gold.
- Founded: 2020; 6 years ago
- Home ground: Leo Magnus Cricket Complex
- Capacity: 5,000

The Los Angeles Lashings (formerly the SoCal Lashings) are an American professional Twenty20 cricket team based in Los Angeles, California, that competes in Minor League Cricket (MiLC). Los Angeles Lashings was named in 2020 as part of the 24 original teams to compete in Minor League Cricket USA. The franchise is co-owned by Abhimanyu Rajp and Deepak Gosain.

The team's current home ground is the Leo Magnus Cricket Complex, located in the neighborhood of Van Nuys. Dale Phillips currently helms responsibility as captain, with Elmore Hutchinson standing by as vice-captain.

== Franchise history ==
=== Background ===
Talks of an American Twenty20 league started in November 2018 just before USA Cricket became the new governing body of cricket in the United States. In May 2021, USA Cricket announced they had accepted a bid by American Cricket Enterprises (ACE) for a US$1 billion investment covering the league and other investments benefitting the U.S. national teams.

In an Annual General Meeting on February 21, 2020, it was announced that USA Cricket was planning to launch Major League Cricket in 2021 and Minor League Cricket that summer, but it was delayed due to the COVID-19 pandemic and due to the lack of high-quality cricket stadiums in the USA. Major League Cricket was pushed to a summer-2023 launch and Minor League Cricket was pushed back to July 31, 2021.

USA Cricket CEO Iain Higgins also pointed out cities such as New York City, Houston and Los Angeles with a large cricket fanbase, and targeted them among others as launch cities for Minor League Cricket.

=== Exhibition league ===
In July 2020, the player registration for the Minor League Cricket exhibition league began. On August 15, 2020, USA Cricket announced the teams participating in the exhibition league matches, also listing the owners for each team. The draft for the exhibition league began on August 22, 2020, with the Lashings releasing their squad on August 24. Abhimanyu Rajp was later named as captain for the Los Angeles Lashings for the exhibition league.

=== Minor League Cricket ===
2021: After the conclusion of the exhibition league, USA Cricket announced that they were planning to launch the inaugural season of Minor League Cricket in spring 2021. Ahead of the official season, which was announced to kick off on July 31, the Lashings announced former USA National Team member Abhimanyu Rajp to continue his role as captain with Elmore Hutchinson helming vice-captain duties.

In their first match of the season, the Lashings defeated the Surf Riders by 4 wickets in a last-over thriller. They then went on to lose to the Blazers and to the Grizzlies, but came back to win against the Strikers by 4 wickets the following week. They then went on a 8-game losing streak, losing to the Strikers, the Grizzlies, the Blazers, the Thunderbolts twice, the Athletics, the Mustangs, and the Hurricanes before winning against the Surf Riders and the Master Blasters to end out the group stage. The Lashings finished out in 5th place, thus failing to qualify for the play-offs.

2022: Ahead of the 2022 season, Major League Cricket announced that the draft for that season would take place on May 12. Dale Phillips took over the Captain's responsibility in 2022 season, along with Katene Clarke signed as the overseas recruits for the year.

2023: Lashings finished one win away from qualifying for the playoffs in their third season.

== League structure ==
Teams in each division will play anywhere from 14 to 16 games in the league stage. Once the league stage is completed, the top two teams in each division will advance to the quarterfinals, wherein the top team in each division will face the second-placed team in the other division of their conference for a best-of-three series. The remaining games will be regular knockout matches, with the semifinals sending one team from each conference to the final. The official schedule and the venues of the playoffs was released on September 20, 2021, by Major League Cricket. The league structure was changed ahead of the 2023 season, with teams in each division now playing 10 games in the league stage. The top team of each division advances directly to the Super 8s, whereas the next two teams advance into the knockout stage. During the knockout stage, a total of 4 teams advance to the Super 8s, wherein the top two teams face each other in the finals.

== Media ==
Matches are streamed by Minor League Cricket on its YouTube channel and the streaming platform FanCode.

== Schedule ==
2024 Minor League Schedule - Los Angeles
Date	Day	Time	Event	Location
9/13/2024	Friday	2:30 PM	vs. Silicon Valley Strikers	Woodley Park - Wright
9/14/2024	Saturday	10:30 AM	vs. Golden State Grizzlies	Woodley Park - Wright
9/15/2024	Sunday	2:30 PM	vs. Silicon Valley Strikers	Woodley Park - Wright
9/16/2024	Monday	10:45 AM	vs. East Bay Blazers	Woodley Park - Wright
9/20/2024	Friday	2:45 PM	vs. Seattle Thunderbolts	Tollgate Farms - Seattle
9/21/2024	Saturday	10:45 AM	vs. Seattle Thunderbolts	Tollgate Farms - Seattle
9/27/2024	Friday	11:45 AM	vs. San Diego Surf Riders	Woodley Park - Wright
9/29/2024	Sunday	10:45 AM	vs. San Diego Surf Riders	Canyonside Park

== Current squad ==
- Players with international caps are listed in **bold**.

Name	Nationality	Batting style	Bowling style	Year signed	Notes
**Dale Phillips**	New Zealand	Right-handed	Right-arm off break	2022	Overseas
**Katene Clarke**	New Zealand	Right-handed	Right-arm off break	2022	Overseas
Shamsher Singh	Canada	Right-handed	Right-arm fast medium	2021	Overseas
**Shiva Vashishat**	United States	Right-handed	N/A	2021	
**Saif Badar**	United States	Right-handed	Right-arm off break	2025	
Harpreet Singh	United States	Left-handed	Right-arm off break	2021	
**Elmore Hutchinson**	United States	Right-handed	Left-arm fast medium	2021	
**Ravi Timbawala**	United States	Right-handed	N/A	2023	
**Mrunal Patel**	United States	Left-handed	Left-arm off spin	2023	
**Kirstan Kallicharan**	Canada	Right-handed	N/A	2021	Overseas
Ruben Clinton	New Zealand	Left-handed	Right-arm off break]	2021	Overseas
Pranav Pragyadala	United States	Right-handed	Right-arm leg break	2023	U17
Ayan Desai	United States	Left-handed	Left-arm fast medium]	2023	U21
Deepak Gosain	United States	Right-handed	N/A	2021	
