= Justin Dill =

South African cricketer (born 1994)

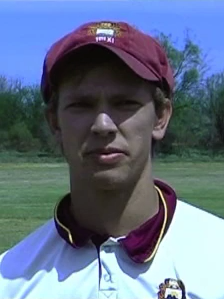
- Dill in 2012

Personal information
- Full name: Justin Greef Dill
- Born: 10 November 1994 (age 32); Port Elizabeth, Cape Province, South Africa
- Batting: Right-handed
- Bowling: Right-arm medium

Domestic team information
- Years: Team
- 2013–present: Boland

Career statistics
Competition	FC	LA	T20
Matches	35	28	10
Runs scored	1012	315	51
Batting average	32.64	28.63	17.00
100s/50s	1/4	0/0	0/0
Top score	131*	47	16*
Balls bowled	4952	1226	210
Wickets	100	33	12
Bowling average	22.48	25.90	21.66
5 wickets in innings	5	0	0
10 wickets in match	1	–	–
Best bowling	6/25	3/14	3/26
Catches/stumpings	12/–	9/–	0/–
- Source: ESPNcricinfo, 9 July 2024

Justin Dill (born 10 November 1994) is a South African cricketer. He was part of South Africa's squad for the 2014 ICC Under-19 Cricket World Cup. He was the leading wicket-taker for Western Province in the 2018–19 CSA 3-Day Provincial Cup, with 34 dismissals in ten matches. In September 2019, he was named in Western Province's squad for the 2019–20 CSA Provincial T20 Cup. In June 2021, he was selected to take part in the Minor League Cricket tournament in the United States following the players' draft.
