= Minor League Cricket =

Twenty20 cricket league in America

- Official logo of Minor League Cricket (MiLC)
- Countries: United States
- Administrator: USA Cricket
- Format: Twenty20
- First edition: 2021
- Latest edition: 2026
- Next edition: 2027
- Tournament format: Double round-robin and Playoffs
- Number of teams: 26
- Current champion: Chicago Kingsmen (2nd title)
- Most successful: Chicago Kingsmen (2 titles)
- Most runs: Unmukt Chand (1712)
- Most wickets: Phani Simhadri (85)
- TV: Willow TV; Sling TV
- Website: minorleaguecricket.com

Minor League Cricket (MiLC) is a semi-professional Twenty20 (T20) cricket league in the United States that serves as the developmental league for Major League Cricket (MLC). The league comprises 26 teams, divided between the Atlantic Conference and the Pacific Conference. Beginning play in 2021, the Silicon Valley Strikers won the inaugural tournament. Due to financial issues and general public disinterest, the 2024 season was shortened to eight matches per side, taking place in the fall, and was won by the Chicago Kingsmen. The league's title sponsor is YASH Technologies, having previously been Sunoco and Toyota.

== History ==
=== Formation ===
Talks of an American Twenty20 league started in November 2018, just before USA Cricket became the new governing body of cricket in the United States. In May 2021, USA Cricket announced they had accepted a bid by American Cricket Enterprises (ACE) for a $1 billion investment covering the league and other investments benefitting the U.S. national teams.

In an annual general meeting on February 21, 2020, it was announced that ACE was planning to launch its professional T20 league Major League Cricket in 2021, and a developmental league, Minor League Cricket that summer. USA Cricket CEO Iain Higgins stated that ACE had "demonstrated an understanding of the importance of addressing various fundamental issues within the domestic game in the United States", and listed a number of metropolitan areas that the developmental league planned to target for franchises.

Both leagues would be delayed due to the COVID-19 pandemic in the United States, with Minor League Cricket being delayed to 2021, and Major League Cricket provisionally postponed to 2022 (in May 2021, Major League Cricket would be further-delayed to 2023 due to both the pandemic, and the need to develop more facilities). Minor League Cricket would still soft launch in 2020 with an exhibition league; the draft for the exhibition league began on August 22, 2020, with the teams releasing their squads on August 24.

=== 2021 ===
After the conclusion of the exhibition league, USA Cricket announced that they were planning to launch the inaugural season of Minor League Cricket in the spring of 2021. The season launched on July 31, 2021, and ran until October 3, 2021, where the Silicon Valley Strikers won the finals against the New Jersey Stallions by six wickets to win the inaugural season title. The sanctioning body announced plans to establish women's leagues in the future.

In February 2021, MLC announced plans for a youth version of Minor and Major League Cricket, as part of a pathway to give young cricketers the opportunity to play for official domestic teams and the national team. In June 2022, MLC announced the inaugural season of the Minor League Cricket Youth Tournament (shortened to MiLC Youth), with UST tapped as title sponsor for the tournament. The inaugural season of MiLC Youth was announced to be contested between 11 teams at the Prairie View Cricket Complex in Houston starting July 25, 2022. The finals for the inaugural season took place on July 29 at between the Dallas Mustangs and the New Jersey Stallions, in which the Stallions beat the Mustangs by two wickets.

=== 2022 ===
In January 2022, USA Cricket announced that the 2022 Minor League Cricket season would start on June 25, and conclude with the final on August 28. The 2022 finals were won by the Seattle Thunderbolts, who beat the Atlanta Fire by ten runs to win their maiden MiLC title. It was also announced in June 2022 that the budget for the 2022 season was more than $5 million.

=== 2023 ===
Amid a dispute with USA Cricket, tournament directors pushed for a June 10 start to the 2023 season of Minor League Cricket. However, this was pushed back to August 4, a week ahead of the conclusion of the 2023 Major League Cricket season. The season saw the discontinuation of two franchises, as well as the renaming of two other teams amid managerial shakeups. The season concluded on October 1, with the Dallas Mustangs defeating the NJ Somerset Cavaliers by 44 runs. All matches played during the season were played on either real grass or hybrid wickets.

In June, MiLC signed a deal with Cricket Canada and Boundaries North to help grow the game in the country through the potential formation of around 4–6 teams based in the area. MiLC announced that they were looking into the British Columbia and Greater Toronto Areas for expansion as soon as the 2024 season.

=== 2024 ===
The 2024 season played following the conclusion of the 2024 Major League Cricket season, in August. The Chicago Kingsmen won the finals over the East Bay Blazers by four wickets in the final held at Grand Prairie Stadium.

=== 2025 ===
The 2025 season played following the conclusion of the 2025 Major League Cricket season in July. The Atlanta Fire won the finals over the defending champions, Chicago Kingsmen, by 5 wickets in the final held at Church Street Park.

=== 2026 ===
The 2026 season began play following the conclusion of the 2026 Major League Cricket season, in September and concluded on August 26.

== Current teams ==
Unlike Major League Cricket, Minor League Cricket uses privately owned franchises. American Cricket Enterprises (ACE) announced 24 teams and their owners on August 15, 2020. On June 3, 2021, ACE added three more teams. Additionally, the teams are part of two conferences, which are each split into two divisions. This consists of the Pacific Conference, split into the Western and Central divisions, and the Atlantic Conference, split into the Eastern and Southern divisions.

Conference	Division	Team	Base	Venue	Founded
Atlantic Conference	Northern	Empire State Titans	New York, NY	Idlewild Park, Queens, NY	2020
Atlantic Conference	Northern	Manhattan Yorkers	New York, NY	Mercer County Park, West Windsor, NJ	2020
Atlantic Conference	Northern	New England Eagles	Hartford, CT	Keney Park, Hartford, CT	2020
Atlantic Conference	Northern	New Jersey Somerset Cavaliers	Somerset, NJ	Howe Athletic Complex, Somerset, NJ	2020
Atlantic Conference	Northern	New Jersey Stallions	Somerset, NJ	Howe Athletic Complex, Somerset, NJ	2020
Atlantic Conference	Northern	The Philadelphians	Philadelphia, PA	Exton Park, Exton, PA	2020
Atlantic Conference	Southern	Atlanta Fire	Atlanta, GA	Atlanta Cricket Field, Cumming, GA	2020
Atlantic Conference	Southern	Atlanta Lightning	Atlanta, GA	Atlanta Cricket Field, Cumming, GA	2022
Atlantic Conference	Southern	Baltimore Royals	Baltimore, MD	Veterans Memorial Park, Woodbridge, VA	2020
Atlantic Conference	Southern	Ft. Lauderdale Lions	Ft. Lauderdale, FL	Broward County Stadium, Lauderhill, FL	2020
Atlantic Conference	Southern	Morrisville Raptors	Morrisville, NC	Church Street Park, Morrisville, NC	2020
Atlantic Conference	Southern	Orlando Galaxy	Orlando, FL	Silverstar Recreation Park, Orlando, FL	2020
Pacific Conference	Central	Chicago Kingsmen	Chicago, IL	Hanover Park, Hanover Park, IL	2020
Pacific Conference	Central	Chicago Tigers	Chicago, IL	Hanover Park, Hanover Park, IL	2022
Pacific Conference	Central	Kings XI Dallas	Dallas, TX	Grand Prairie Cricket Stadium, Grand Prairie, TX	2020
Pacific Conference	Central	Dallas Xforia Giants	Dallas, TX	Grand Prairie Cricket Stadium, Grand Prairie, TX	2023
Pacific Conference	Central	Metroplex Tracers	Dallas, TX	Grand Prairie Cricket Stadium, Grand Prairie, TX	2020
Pacific Conference	Central	Lone Star Athletics	Houston, TX	Moosa Stadium, Pearland, TX	2020
Pacific Conference	Central	Michigan Cricket Stars	Detroit, MI	Lyon Oaks Cricket Ground, Wixom, MI	2020
Pacific Conference	Central	St. Louis Americans	St. Louis, MO	ACAC Park, Wentzville, MO	2020
Pacific Conference	Western	East Bay Blazers	San Jose, CA	Morgan Hills Sports Complex, Morgan Hill, CA	2020
Pacific Conference	Western	Golden State Grizzlies	Sacramento, CA	Arroyo Park, Davis, CA	2020
Pacific Conference	Western	San Diego Surf Riders	San Diego, CA	Canyonside Park, San Diego, CA	2020
Pacific Conference	Western	Seattle Thunderbolts	Seattle, WA	Tollgate Farm Park, North Bend, WA	2020
Pacific Conference	Western	Silicon Valley Strikers	Silicon Valley, CA	Morgan Hills Sports Complex, Morgan Hill, CA	2020
Pacific Conference	Western	Los Angeles Lashings	Los Angeles, CA	Leo Magnus Cricket Complex, Los Angeles, CA	2020

Atlantic Conference: Eastern Division, Southern Division
Pacific Conference: Western Division, Central Division

== League structure ==
Teams in each division will play anywhere from 14 to 16 games in the league stage. Once the league stage is completed, the top two teams in each division will advance to the quarterfinals, wherein the top team in each division will face the second-placed team in the other division of their conference for a best-of-three series. The remaining games will be regular knockout matches, with the semifinals sending one team from each conference to the final. The official schedule and the venues of the playoffs was released on September 20, 2021, by Major League Cricket. The league structure was changed ahead of the 2023 season, with teams in each division now playing 10 games in the league stage. The top team of each division advances directly to the Super 8s, whereas the next two teams advance into the knockout stage. During the knockout stage, a total of 4 teams advance to the Super 8s, wherein the top two teams face each other in the finals.

The inaugural season of Minor League Cricket had a total prize pool of $250,000, the highest ever in American cricket. This was increased to $350,000 for the 2022 season, $150,000 of which went to the tournament champions, the Seattle Thunderbolts.

== Tournament season and results ==
MiLC season winners
Season	Venue	Final			Player of the series	No. of teams	Matches
Season	Venue	Winner	Result	Runners-up	Player of the series	No. of teams	Matches
2021	Church Street Park, Morrisville	Silicon Valley Strikers	Silicon Valley Strikers won by 6 wickets Scorecard	New Jersey Stallions	Hammad Azam	27	225
2022	Church Street Park, Morrisville	Seattle Thunderbolts	Seattle Thunderbolts won by 10 runs	Atlanta Fire	Phani Simhadri	26	197
2023	Grand Prairie Stadium, Texas	Dallas Mustangs	Dallas Mustangs won by 44 runs	NJ Somerset Cavaliers	Andries Gous	26	150
2024	Grand Prairie Stadium, Texas	Chicago Kingsmen	Chicago Kingsmen won by 4 wickets	East Bay Blazers		25	113
2025	Church Street Park, Morrisville	Atlanta Fire	Atlanta Fire won by 5 wickets	Chicago Kingsmen			
2026	Kingsmen Arena, Pearland	Chicago Kingsmen	Chicago Kingsmen won by 3 wickets	Baltimore Royals		26	62

== Venues ==
A complete list of ground venues, along with the 2024 season's schedule, was released on July 31.

Chicago Kingsmen	Chicago Tigers	Metroplex Tracers
Kingsmen Stadium	Tigers Park	Grand Prairie Stadium
Lone Star Athletics	Kings XI Dallas	Dallas Xforia Giants
Moosa Stadium	Grand Prairie Stadium	Grand Prairie Stadium
Michigan Cricket Stars	St. Louis Americans	Baltimore Royals
–	ACAC Park	–
Empire State Titans	New England Eagles	New Jersey Somerset Cavaliers
Glenville Cricket Complex	Mercer County Park	Mercer County Park
New Jersey Stallions	Philadelphians	Manhattan Yorkers
Mercer County Park	Hatfield Park	Mercer County Park
Atlanta Fire	Atlanta Lightning	Ft. Lauderdale Lions
Param Veers Cricket Field	Atlanta Cricket Field	Broward County Stadium
Morrisville Raptors	Orlando Galaxy	Bay Blazers
Church Street Park	–	Santa Clara Cricket Stadium
Hollywood Master Blasters	San Diego Surf Riders	Golden State Grizzlies
Leo Magnus Cricket Complex	Canyonside Park	Arroyo Park
Silicon Valley Strikers	SoCal Lashings	Seattle Thunderbolts
Morgan Hills Sports Complex	Leo Magnus Cricket Complex	Tollgate Farm Park
Minor League Cricket is located in the United States

- – Western Division (Pacific Conference)
- – Central Division (Pacific Conference)
- – Eastern Division (Atlantic Conference)
- – Southern Division (Atlantic Conference)

== Former teams ==
- Florida Beamers (2021)

== Media ==
Matches are streamed by Major League Cricket on its YouTube channel and the streaming platform FanCode.

== See also ==
- History of United States cricket
- Cricket in the United States
- Impact of the COVID-19 pandemic on cricket
