= Seattle Thunderbolts =

Seattle-based cricket team in Minor League Cricket

- League: Minor League Cricket
- Conference: Western Division (Pacific Conference)

Personnel
- Captain: Ian Dev Singh
- Coach: Paul Valthaty
- Owner: Vijay Beniwal; Phani Chitneni; Salman Taj
- Chief executive: Vijay Beniwal; Phani Chitneni

Team information
- City: Seattle, Washington
- Colours: Pink, and Blue.
- Founded: 2021; 5 years ago
- Home ground: Klahanie Park, Klahanie, Washington; Marymoor Park, Redmond, Washington

History
- MiLC wins: 1 (2022)
T20 kit

The Seattle Thunderbolts are an American professional Twenty20 cricket team based in the Seattle metropolitan area that competes in Minor League Cricket (MiLC). It was formed in 2021 as part of 3 new teams to compete in Minor League Cricket. The franchise is owned by Seattle Sports LLC, as part of its cricket development program, owned by Phani Chitneni, Vijay Beniwal, and Salman Taj.

The team's home ground is Klahanie Park and Marymoor Park, both located in the Eastside region of King County, Washington. They are coached by Paul Valthaty and captained by Ian Dev Singh.

The current leading run-scorer is Andries Gous, with the highest wicket-taker being Shadley van Schalkwyk.

== Franchise history ==
=== Background ===
Talks of an American Twenty20 league started in November 2018 just before USA Cricket became the new governing body of cricket in the United States. In May 2021, USA Cricket announced they had accepted a bid by American Cricket Enterprises (ACE) for a US$1 billion investment covering the league and other investments benefitting the U.S. national teams.

In an Annual General Meeting on February 21, 2020, it was announced that USA Cricket was planning to launch Major League Cricket in 2021 and Minor League Cricket that summer, but it was delayed due to the COVID-19 pandemic and due to the lack of high-quality cricket stadiums in the USA. Major League Cricket was pushed to a summer-2023 launch and Minor League Cricket was pushed back to July 31, 2021.

USA Cricket CEO Iain Higgins pointed out cities such as New York City, Houston and Los Angeles with a large cricket fanbase, and targeted them among others as launch cities for Minor League Cricket.

=== 2021 season ===
Before the season's drafting, USA Cricket and American Cricket Enterprises (ACE) announced 3 new teams for the 2021 season including the Seattle Thunderbolts, the Manhattan Yorkers, and the St. Louis Americans. Ahead of the official season, which was announced to kick off on July 31, they announced Harmeet Singh as captain and Andries Gous as vice-captain.

For their first four matches of the season, they lost by a margin of 7, 6, 2, and 7 wickets, before going on a 6-match winning streak. Their winning streak was ended due to a 46-run loss against the Michigan Cricket Stars. They then lost back-to-back matches against the Golden State Grizzlies and the East Bay Blazers, before winning by 7 wickets against the Silicon Valley Strikers in their last match of the season.

They ended off the group stage with 7 wins and 7 losses, ending up in 4th place in their division, thus not qualifying for the finals.

=== 2022 season ===
Ahead of the 2022 season, Major League Cricket announced that the draft for that season would take place on May 12.

== Current squad ==
- Players with international caps are listed in **bold**.

Name	Nationality	Birth date	Batting style	Bowling style	Year signed	Notes
Batsmen
**Andries Gous**	United States	24 November 1993 (age 32)	Right-handed	Right-arm off spin	2021	
Shreyas Chitneni	United States	9 September 1997 (age 29)	Right-handed	Right-arm medium	2021	
**Harmeet Singh**	United States	7 September 1992 (age 34)	Right-handed	Left-arm orthodox spin	2021	
**Ian Dev Singh**	India	1 March 1989 (age 37)	Right-handed	Right-arm off break	2024	Overseas Captain
Manu Jacob	United States	24 April 1984 (age 42)	Right-handed	Right-arm medium	2021	
Nital Vasavada	United States	15 July 2001 (age 25)	Right-handed	Right-arm medium	2021	
All-rounders
Abir Chippa	United States	13 February 1995 (age 31)	Right-handed	Right-arm medium	2021	
Damodhar Bhat	United States	17 December 1991 (age 34)	Right-handed	Right-arm off break	2021	
Jagroop Raina	United States	30 September 1998 (age 28)	Left-handed	Right-arm medium	2021	
Rishab Mohan	United States	10 June 2003 (age 23)	Right-handed	Right-arm medium	2021	
Sahil Kancherla	United States	25 April 2000 (age 26)	Right-handed	Right-arm off spin	2021	
**Shadley van Schalkwyk**	United States	5 August 1988 (age 38)	Left-handed	Left-arm fast	2021	Overseas
Ujjawal Patel	United States	19 July 1992 (age 34)	Right-handed	Right-arm fast medium	2021	
Varun Potlapally	United States	9 April 1997 (age 29)	Right-handed	Right-arm off break	2021	
Phani Simhadri	United States	13 May 2002 (age 24)	Right-handed	Right-arm medium fast	2021	
Wicket-keepers
Mudi Prajith	India	17 September 1989 (age 37)	Right-handed		2021	Overseas
Bowlers
Krish Katre	United States	8 March 1997 (age 29)	Right-handed	Right-arm medium fast	2021	
Manoj Panwar	United States	5 June 1998 (age 28)	Right-handed	Right-arm fast	2021	

== See also ==
- Minor League Cricket
- Major League Cricket
