= Vice-captain =

Vice-captain, alternate captain (ice hockey) or vice-skip (curling) may refer to a role in a number of sports immediately below the role of captain. The vice-captain may have a number of different roles, including substituting as captain when the regular captain is injured, substituted or unavailable, or becoming the new captain if the original captain can't actually be the captain anymore. In some instances, vice-captain can be a similar role to a co-captain, in which there are at least two people who equally share the responsibilities of being the vice-captain.

In sports involving goalkeepers a vice-captain can also act as a de facto outfield captain in case the goalkeeper of the team is the captain.

== See also ==
- Vice-captain (association football)
- Captain (Australian rules football)
- Captain (cricket)
- Captain (ice hockey)
- Vice (curling)
