= Silicon Valley Strikers =

Silicon Valley-based cricket team in Minor League Cricket

- League: Minor League Cricket
- Conference: Western Division (Pacific Conference)

Personnel
- Captain: Unmukt Chand
- Owner: Stanford Strikers LLC

Team information
- City: Silicon Valley, California
- Colours: Cyan, and Blue.
- Founded: 2020; 6 years ago
- Home ground: Morgan Hills Outdoor Sports Complex

History
- MiLC wins: 1 (2021)
T20 kit

The Silicon Valley Strikers are an American professional Twenty20 cricket team based in the San Francisco Bay Area that competes in Minor League Cricket (MiLC). It was formed in 2020 as part of 24 original teams to compete in Minor League Cricket. The franchise is owned by Stanford Strikers LLC.

The team's home ground is Morgan Hills Outdoor Sports Complex, located in Morgan Hill, California. Pranay Suri was named as captain for the 2023 Minor league season, replacing Unmukt Chand.

The current leading run-scorer is Unmukt Chand, with the highest wicket-taker being Pranay Suri.

== Franchise history ==
=== Background ===
Talks of an American Twenty20 league started in November 2018 just before USA Cricket became the new governing body of cricket in the United States. In May 2021, USA Cricket announced they had accepted a bid by American Cricket Enterprises (ACE) for a US$1 billion investment covering the league and other investments benefitting the U.S. national teams.

In an Annual General Meeting on February 21, 2020, it was announced that USA Cricket was planning to launch Major League Cricket in 2021 and Minor League Cricket that summer, but it was delayed due to the COVID-19 pandemic and due to the lack of high-quality cricket stadiums in the USA. Major League Cricket was pushed to a summer-2023 launch and Minor League Cricket was pushed back to July 31, 2021.

USA Cricket CEO Iain Higgins also pointed out cities such as New York City, Houston and Los Angeles with a large cricket fanbase, and targeted them among others as launch cities for Minor League Cricket.

=== Exhibition league ===
In July 2020, the player registration for the Minor League Cricket exhibition league began. On August 15, 2020, USA Cricket announced the teams participating in the exhibition league matches, also listing the owners for each team. The draft for the exhibition league began on August 22, 2020, with the Silicon Valley Strikers releasing their squad on August 24. Shadley van Schalkwyk was later named as captain for the Silicon Valley Strikers in the exhibition league.

=== 2021 season ===
After the conclusion of the exhibition league, USA Cricket announced that they were planning to launch the inaugural season of Minor League Cricket in spring 2021. Ahead of the official season, which was announced to kick off on July 31, they announced Unmukt Chand as captain and Pranay Suri as vice-captain (although originally Suri was captain, due to Chand not being called in the squad until the third week).

In their first match of the season, the Strikers defeated the Thunderbolts by 2 wickets. They then went on to win against the Master Blasters, the Surf Riders twice, the Blazers twice, the Lashings, the Grizzlies twice, and the Thunderbolts again. They additionally lost against the Lashings, the Master Blasters, and the Thunderbolts throughout the group stage. They placed 2nd in their group, thus qualifying the Strikers for the quarter-finals.

In the quarter-finals, the Strikers won against the Austin Athletics in a best-of-3 series 2–1, qualifying them for the semi-finals. During the semi-finals, the Strikers bowled out the Grizzlies for 135 to win by 33 runs and take them to the finals. In the finals, they won against the Stallions by 6 wickets to win their maiden MiLC title.

=== 2022 season ===
Ahead of the 2022 season, Major League Cricket announced that the draft for that season would take place on May 12.

== Current squad ==
- Players with international caps are listed in **bold**.

Name	Nationality	Birth date	Batting style	Bowling style	Year signed	Notes
Batsmen
Arsh Buch	United States	22 October 1994 (age 32)	Right-handed	Right-arm medium	2021	
**Narsingh Deonarine**	Guyana	16 August 1983 (age 43)	Left-handed	Right-arm off-break	2020	Overseas
Rohith Ramkumar	United States	18 January 1985 (age 41)	Right-handed	Right-arm medium	2021	
Roshon Primus	Barbados	14 August 1995 (age 31)	Right-handed	Left-arm medium	2021	Overseas
**Unmukt Chand**	India	26 March 1993 (age 33)	Right-handed	Right-arm off-break	2021	Overseas captain
All-rounders
Anoop Krishnan	United States	6 March 1987 (age 39)	Right-handed	Right-arm medium	2021	
Dev Thadani	United States	17 September 1998 (age 28)	Right-handed	Right-arm medium	2021	
Dilpreet Billing	United States	15 July 1991 (age 35)	Right-handed	Right-arm fast	2020	
Gary Graham	Jamaica	6 August 1982 (age 44)	Right-handed	Right-arm medium	2020	Overseas
Pranay Suri	United States	22 December 1992 (age 33)	Right-handed	Right-arm off-break	2020	Vice-captain
Rushil Ugarkar	United States	30 June 2003 (age 23)	Right-handed	Right-arm fast medium	2021	
**Shehan Jayasuriya**	Sri Lanka	12 September 1991 (age 35)	Left-handed	Right-arm off break	2021	Overseas
Srinivas Raghavan	United States	4 December 1992 (age 33)	Right-handed	Right-arm off break	2020	
Umang Parikh	United States	24 March 1993 (age 33)	Left-handed	Left-arm Spin	2021	
Bowlers
**Abhishek Paradkar**	United States	8 November 2000 (age 26)	Left-handed	Left-handed medium	2021	
Waqar Salamkheil	United States	2 October 2001 (age 25)	Right-handed	Left-arm medium	2025	
**Saurabh Netravalkar**	United States	16 October 1991 (age 35)	Right-handed	Left-arm medium	2021	
Wicket-keepers
Rahul Jariwala	United States	3 June 2004 (age 22)	Right-handed		2020	
