= USA Cricket =

Governing body of cricket in the U.S.

- Sport: Cricket
- Jurisdiction: United States
- Abbreviation: USAC
- Founded: 2017; 9 years ago
- Affiliation: International Cricket Council
- Affiliation date: 2019
- Regional affiliation: ICC Americas
- Headquarters: Dallas, Texas, U.S.
- Chairman: Venu Pisike
- Chairperson: Rohan Alexander
- CEO: Johnathan Atkeison
- Secretary: Aijaz Ali
- Sponsor: OM Group
- Replaced: United States of America Cricket Association

Official website
- usacricket.org
- (United States)

USA Cricket (USAC) is the governing body of cricket in the United States. USA Cricket operates all of the United States national representative cricket sides, including the men's and women's national teams and youth teams, as well as Major League Cricket (MLC), which is the highest level of domestic American Twenty20 cricket.

The body was unveiled on September 24, 2017, as a proposed successor to the United States of America Cricket Association, which had been expelled from the International Cricket Council (ICC) in June 2017 due to governance issues. In January 2019, it was approved as an associate member of the ICC. In September 2025, the ICC suspended USA Cricket's board amid governance issues of its own, coinciding with disputes between the organization and its commercial partner. It would file for chapter 11 bankruptcy in October 2025.

== History ==
=== Background ===
In June 2017, the ICC voted to expel the USACA from the ICC, due to issues with governance of the sport in the United States. Control of the United States national team was handed over to ICC Americas until a new board was formed.

=== Creation and first years ===
On September 24, 2017 (the anniversary of the 1844 Canada-United States cricket match, and on the heels of a U.S. victory in the Canada-U.S. K.A. Auty Cup), USA Cricket was announced as a new proposed sanctioning body, including a logo unveiled by Denver-based group Adrenalin (using a cricket bat as the main symbol, deeming it to have stronger symbolism with the sport among the U.S. audience than other common symbols, such as the stumps or ball). The new body stated that its goal was to help build popularity for the game among a "mainstream" audience (as opposed to predominantly expats from other regions), with project manager Eric Parthen describing it as a "fresh start" that would "celebrate the past and look to the future".

The first USA Cricket elections were conducted in 2018, in accordance with the new USAC Cricket Constitution. The Constitution was developed between 2016 and 2018 by the ICC appointed USA Cricket Sustainable Foundations Activity Group, with support from the ICC and USOC. USA Cricket selected its first independent board later in 2018 based on recommendations of the initial Nominations and Governance Committee as constitutionally required. In November 2018, USA Cricket put out a request for proposals surrounding the establishment of a domestic Twenty20 league by 2021, with goals to "engage existing fans and grow new ones to support the bullish vision this Board has for cricket in the US", and "support the sustainable development of cricketing infrastructure across the United States" (noting that Central Broward Regional Park was the only ICC-certified cricket ground in the country). In January 2019, USA Cricket was officially approved by the ICC as its 105th associate member.

In May 2019, USA Cricket announced that it had accepted a bid by American Cricket Enterprises (ACE) for a $1 billion investment in its proposed T20 league; ACE's partners include Satyan Gajwani and Vineet Jain of The Times Group, and Willow TV founders Sameer Mehta and Vijay Srinivasan. Per the agreement, ACE was to provide investments for the league (including developmental and professional circuits), facilities, and support of the U.S. national teams.

During its inaugural annual general meeting in February 2020, USA Cricket announced plans to launch its franchise-based T20 league Major League Cricket in 2021, stage the inaugural season of its development league Minor League Cricket in 2020, back proposals for cricket to be staged at the 2028 Summer Olympics in Los Angeles, and pursue bids to host a future ICC tournament in the country between 2023 and 2031. It was also stated that USA Cricket may attempt to pursue full member status with the ICC.

In October 2020, USA Cricket unveiled a "foundational plan" for 2020–23, including plans to promote youth and women's cricket, primarily focus on T20 (including the launch of Major League Cricket in 2022, delayed from 2021 due to COVID-19), and partner with Cricket West Indies on bids to host ICC events in the United States. The organization plans to initially target its activities towards markets where there is "already significant interest in and passion for the sport". USA Cricket also set long-term goals to reach ICC full member status by 2030. It aimed to qualify for the 2022 Under-19 Cricket World Cup (however, all qualification tournaments were cancelled due to COVID-19, and Canada thus qualified automatically based on previous performance), and to "develop a clear and balanced long-term international playing calendar for our national teams that includes more content, played more frequently against competitive opposition."

In November 2020, USA Cricket announced that ACE had leased AirHogs Stadium in Grand Prairie, Texas (which previously operated as the home of the recently folded Texas AirHogs baseball team), with plans to redevelop it as a cricket-specific stadium and as home field of a Texas-based franchise in Major League Cricket.

In November 2021, the ICC announced that Cricket West Indies and USA Cricket would co-host the 2024 Men's T20 World Cup, with matches expected to be played in both regions.

=== Financial and governance issues ===
In March 2021, two USA Cricket board members filed a lawsuit against CEO Iain Higgins and five other board members, alleging irregularities in its election process, including a referendum to immediately grant voting rights to members rather than requiring that they be members for 12 months (allegedly expanding the voting base to over 20,000 eligible members) that was implemented despite not meeting the required supermajority, and the organization having indefinitely delayed annual elections that were required to occur at the end of November. The election continued to be delayed as of February 2022. On November 15, 2021, it was reported that Higgins had stepped down as CEO, amid internal issues within the organization; the position remained vacant. The lawsuit was settled in May 2022, after board chairman Paraag Marathe announced his resignation, which allowed the elections to move forward and begin on July 8, 2022. Separately, ex-CEO Iain Higgins was given $300,000 as part of an agreement to avoid more legal action against USAC.

On October 3, 2022, it was reported that USA Cricket was seriously in debt, had failed to file annual financial reports, and failed to host an annual general meeting in 2020, leading the ICC to suspend funding payments. The curtailment of Ireland's December 2021 series against the United States due to COVID-19 outbreaks (causing only the T20 matches to be played) was reported to have resulted in six-figure losses for the sanctioning body.

It was concurrently reported that USA Cricket had been removed as an administrative co-host of the 2024 T20 World Cup due to these issues, but that Cricket West Indies would still host tournament matches in the United States. Ahead of the next annual general meeting on October 9, Srinivasan stated that ACE was concerned over USA Cricket's mounting debt, and concerns that players and board members were not being paid despite ACE's agreements and funding.

ACE had chosen not to fully back the Ireland series due to cost concerns related to its scheduling and COVID-19 protocols. The series, which cost $400,000 to host, was not part of USA Cricket's budget for 2021. Srinivasan explained that USAC "came in far, far below even what we thought they would come short of", and "the way this arrangement is meant to work is they find a Full Member or multiple Full Members to come and we would fund all of that. The exposure is meant to be ours and then we would monetize it, commercialize it and if there is a loss, that's our loss to bear. This was unique in the sense that we were not willing to do it given all the constraints. So we said if this is something you still want to go ahead, you do all of it. We'll front you the cash to pull it off, but you keep all the revenue. But the exposure is also yours."

On October 10 during the AGM, USA Cricket's new treasurer Kuljit Singh-Nijjar issued a report stating that it had amassed $650,000 in debt by the end of 2021, citing spending higher than budgeted projections, nearly $800,000 in "administrative expenses", and falling short of its projection of $1.1 million in sponsorship revenue. Due to these issues, the 2022 USA Cricket senior men's and junior national championships were cancelled. Interim board chairman Atul Rai stated that it had resolved its outstanding payments to the ICC, and was also evaluating candidates for its new CEO. On October 21, Vinay Bhimjiani was appointed as the new CEO of USA Cricket. Later that week, USAC's Nominating and Governance Committee (NGC) announced that they were accepting applications for 3 independent directors.

USA Cricket, in concordance with the NGC, then went on to announce their postponed 2021 elections on November 19, 2022. In their announcement, they released their member eligibility lists and also separately announced calls for 3 board directors.

In January 2023, USAC announced Patricia Whittaker, David Haubert, and Pintoo Shah replacing the former Paraag Marathe, Rohan Sajdeh, and Catherine Carlson as independent board directors. This sparked controversy as Whittaker served USA Cricket prior as a selector in 2021, going against USAC's constitution, stating that a person must not have held position in USAC, the ICC, or any national, local, or regional governing and administrative body within 3 years of the date of applicable election.

Shortly thereafter, an email co-signed by 21 people was sent to USA Cricket challenging the constitutionality of the NGC. The email protested and pointed out many instances of USAC constitution violations ahead of the 2021 USAC elections, threatening legal action if the problems weren't resolved. Following the email, USAC excluded email co-signers Sushil Nadkarni, Ajay Jhamb, and others from their final candidates and voter list for the 2021 elections. Additionally, USAC also approved many ineligible candidates for the elections, sparking further controversy.

Following many email co-signers' exclusion from the 2021 elections and USAC's inability to overhaul and "roll back any past improper actions" of the NGC, Nadkarni and Jhamb filed a joint-lawsuit against USA Cricket and members of the NGC. The lawsuit alleged "numerous" violations of USA Cricket's constitution by the NGC and requested that USA Cricket be forced to deconstruct its NGC, which they allege was formed unconstitutionally. The lawsuit additionally points out other numerous unconstitutional actions, including the appointment of Whittaker as an independent director, a lack of election candidates, and the approval of many ineligible election candidates and voters. As a result, a court hearing was scheduled for the third week of February. The court then imposed a restraining order on the 2021 elections which were set to be held on February 6.

In July 2024, the ICC issued a warning to USA Cricket over potential violations of its status as an associate member, including not having a "fit-for purpose administrative structure", and the organization not meeting governance standards set by the United States Olympic & Paralympic Committee (USOPC) for it to be recognized as a national governing body—a status required for cricket to be contested in the 2028 Summer Olympics. On February 15, 2025, USA Cricket announced changes to its structure to improve governance and increase player representation in compliance with USOPC standards, including removing Singh-Nijjar, Whittaker, and one other director, recommending the reappointment of Haubert as independent director, extending voting eligibility in elections to all registered individual members of USAC, and adding four Athlete Director positions and a USOPC Athlete’s Commission (the latter serving as a liaison for USAC's involvement in cricket at the Summer Olympics).

=== Disputes with ACE, ICC suspension ===
On July 10, 2025, the ICC issued a "roadmap" to USA Cricket to "restore regulatory compliance and functional integrity" to the organization to help achieve national governing body status, with its first step recommending the resignation of the entire USA Cricket executive board.

On August 21, 2025, USAC announced that it would terminate its commercial agreements with ACE, citing a failure to "fulfill its contractual and fiduciary obligations" related to activities such as "financial commitments, infrastructure development, organizational, structural, and governance responsibilities". ACE criticized the move, stating that it was unlawful and "undermines the hard work and dedication of all players, staff and team personnel involved in U.S. cricket, and the continued development of the sport in this country." On September 9, Cricbuzz quoted USAC sources that the decision had been reversed. However, on September 16, USAC suspended the agreements again. The next day, ACE filed a lawsuit against USAC for wrongful termination, describing the body's conduct as "chaotic and reckless", and arguing that its board members were prioritizing personal interests over player development.

On September 23, USA Cricket's board was suspended by the ICC, citing breaches of obligations including but not limited to a failure to create and maintain a "functional governance structure", insufficient progress on USOPC recognition, and "significant actions that have caused reputational damage to cricket in the United States and around the world." The ICC stated that it would manage the United States national teams, and that this will not affect its participation in upcoming events such as the 2026 Men's T20 World Cup. It will also handle sanctioning for competitions that were being sanctioned by USAC.

On October 1, shortly before a preliminary hearing with ACE, USA Cricket filed for Chapter 11 bankruptcy protection. In December 2025, it was reported that the ICC would work with the USOPC to ensure the welfare of U.S. national team players and staff, and ensure that the USAC suspension does not impact the ability to stage cricket at the 2028 Summer Olympics. The ICC also revealed that USAC had rejected an offer for a loan to cover the salaries of players and staff, and would work to pay them directly.

== Domestic tournaments ==
USA Cricket sponsors and sanctions the following national-level tournaments:

=== Men's domestic cricket ===
==== Leagues ====
- Major League Cricket
- Minor League Cricket
- United States Premier League
- American Premier League
- Global Cricket League

==== Cups ====
- Unity Cup
- DYCL Independence Cup, Dallas
- MLC Jr
- National Youth Cricket League, Maryland
- National Youth Cricket Tournament, Houston
- USAC Junior Pathway

==== Opens ====
- Atlanta Open
- Houston Open T20 Tournament

==== T10 ====
- Masters T10 Tournament

=== Women's domestic cricket ===
- St. Louis Women's Open
- St. Charles Women Cricket Festival
- National Women's Cricket League

== See also ==
- USA national cricket team
- USA women's national cricket team
- USA national under-19 cricket team
- USA women's national under-19 cricket team
- List of United States ODI cricketers
- List of United States Twenty20 International cricketers
