= 2022 Minor League Cricket season =

Twenty20 cricket tournament in America

- Dates: June 25, 2022 – August 28, 2022
- Administrator(s): USA Cricket; Major League Cricket
- Cricket format: Twenty20
- Tournament format(s): Round-robin and knockout
- Champions: Seattle Thunderbolts (1st title)
- Runners-up: Atlanta Fire
- Participants: 26
- Matches: 197
- Player of the series: Phani Simhadri
- Most runs: Unmukt Chand (SVS) (693)
- Most wickets: Phani Simhadri (ST) (43)
- Official website: minorleaguecricket.com

The 2022 Minor League Cricket season (branded as the 2022 Toyota Minor League Cricket championship presented by Sunoco for sponsorship reasons and sometimes shortened to 2022 MiLC) was the second season of Minor League Cricket, established by USA Cricket (USAC) and Major League Cricket (MLC) in 2019. Toyota returned from the previous season as title sponsor, with Sunoco tapped as the Official Fuel and Convenience Store of MiLC. The season was hosted over 20 venues across the United States, with matches being broadcast through Willow and Sling TV. It was played from June 25 to August 28, 2022.

The tournament was won by the Seattle Thunderbolts, who defeated the Atlanta Fire in the final played in Morrisville, North Carolina by 10 runs, with Phani Simhadri of the Seattle Thunderbolts winning the award for Most Valuable Player of the series. The Silicon Valley Strikers were the defending champions.

== Teams and venues ==
The complete list of ground venues was announced by Major League Cricket a day prior to the season opening.

For this season, the Chicago Catchers and the Atlanta Param Veers franchises were replaced by the Chicago Tigers and the Atlanta Lightning, while the Austin Athletics and the Irving Mustangs were renamed the Lone Star Athletics and the Dallas Mustangs respectively. It was also announced that the Florida Beamers were on hiatus for the 2022 season, and as such, would not return for this season.

In June 2022, it was also announced that the Morrisville Raptors would be replacing the recently discontinued Morrisville Cardinals.

=== Pacific Conference ===
Western Division

- Silicon Valley Strikers (Bay Peninsula) – Morgan Hills Sports Complex
- Bay Blazers (East Bay) – Morgan Hills Sports Complex
- Leo Magnus Cricket Complex
  - Hollywood Master Blasters – Los Angeles
  - SoCal Lashings – Los Angeles
- Golden State Grizzlies (Sacramento, California) – Arroyo Park
- San Diego Surf Riders (San Diego) – Canyonside Park
- Seattle Thunderbolts (Seattle) – Tollgate Farm Park

Central Division

- Lone Star Athletics (Austin, Texas) – Moosa Stadium
- Chicago
  - Chicago Blasters (Hanover Park)
  - Chicago Tigers (Hanover Park)
- Dallas Mustangs (Dallas) – Las Colinas Polo Ground
- Houston Hurricanes (Houston) – Prairie View Cricket Complex
- Michigan Cricket Stars (Michigan) – Lyon Oaks Cricket Ground
- St. Louis Americans (St. Louis) – ACAC Park

=== Atlantic Conference ===
Eastern Division

- New England Eagles (Boston) –Keney Park
- NJ Somerset Cavaliers (Somerset, New Jersey) – Howe Athletic Complex
- New Jersey Stallions (Jersey City, New Jersey) – Howe Athletic Complex
- Empire State Titans (New York City) – Idlewild Park
- Manhattan Yorkers (New York) – Mercer County Park
- The Philadelphians (Philadelphia) –Exton Park
- DC Hawks (Washington, D. C.) – Veterans Cricket Field

Southern Division

- Atlanta Cricket Field (Atlanta)
  - Atlanta Fire
  - Atlanta Lightning
- Ft. Lauderdale Lions (Fort Lauderdale, Florida) – Broward County Stadium
- Morrisville Raptors (Morrisville, North Carolina) – Church Street Park
- Orlando Galaxy (Orlando) – Silverstar Recreation Park
* – Western Division (Pacific Conference)
- – Central Division (Pacific Conference)
- – Eastern Division (Atlantic Conference)
- – Southern Division (Atlantic Conference)

== Squads ==
Each team released their squad on May 16, 2022.

Atlanta Fire

- Amila Aponso
- Gavaska Channer
- Corné Dry
- Evroy Dyer
- Aaron Jones
- Danush Kaveripakam
- Rishi Pandey
- Ridwan Palash
- Jay Pathak
- Nithil Reddy
- Salman Safi
- Zain Sayed
- Ateendra Subramanian
- Steven Taylor
- Viraj Vaghela
- Rahkeem Cornwall

Atlanta Lightning

- Sahil Charania
- Aran Chenchu
- Aman Hamidi
- Hanchard Hamilton
- Neive McNally
- Mark Parchment
- Sagar Patel
- Heer Patel
- Kyle Phillip
- Khary Pierre
- Amrut Pore
- Rajiv Redhi
- Heath Richards
- Aditya Sharma
- Shamar Springer

Ft. Lauderdale Lions

- Shamarie Brown
- Honey Gori
- Atul Iyer
- Herlando Johnson
- Sameer Khan
- Christopher Lamont
- Masood Mohammed
- Dean Morgan
- Adam Sanford
- Roy Silva
- Shuaib Syed
- Elton Tucker Jr.
- Kesrick Williams
- Kiran Vade
- Ujjwal Vinnakota

Morrisville Raptors

- Murali Ankaraju
- Colin Archibald
- Abhiram Bolisetty
- Siva Kumar
- Karthikeya Jagadish
- Vinothkumar Kandaswamy
- Chinmay Kushare
- Lahiru Milantha
- Aditya Padala
- Rohan Phadke
- Dane Piedt
- Obus Pienaar
- Kiran Saravanakumar
- Muhammad Shah
- Aryan Shah
- Sanjay Stanley

Orlando Galaxy

- Dimitri Adams
- Naseer Ahmed
- Tagenarine Chanderpaul
- Matthew Comerie
- Hardik Desai
- B Gnanasakthi
- Jermaine Harrison
- Adam Khan
- Isuru Kiruwitage
- Dunae Nathaniel
- Manav Patel
- Meetul Patel
- Visvas Patel
- Sumit Sehrawat
- Vasu Vegi

DC Hawks

- Pranto Ahmed
- Arsh Arora
- Aaryan Batra
- Ritwik Behera
- Rasesh Behera
- Franklin Clement
- Sahil Kapoor
- Jaskaran Malhotra
- Junaid Nadir
- Ishan Sharma
- Warisjot Sidhu
- Sunny Sohal
- Tallal Zia
- Bipul Sharma
- Sarabjit Ladda
- Warisjot Sidhu

Empire State Titans

- Usman Ashraf
- Tapash Baisya
- Adil Bhatti
- Jaladh Dua
- Tohidul Islam
- Sumeet Kumar
- Chaitanya Parwal
- Monank Patel
- Savan Patel
- Chintan Patel
- Kwame Patton Jr.
- Vidyut Rajagopal
- Vivek Ravichandran
- Gauranshu Sharma
- Adithya Venkatesh
- Adithya Bharadwaj

Manhattan Yorkers

- Raj Bhavsar
- Rajdeep Darbar
- Shawn Findlay
- Noman Iftikhar
- Advaith Jagannath
- Yasir Mohammad
- Smit Patel
- Danesh Patel
- Raj Patel
- Deveshwari Prashad
- Kevin Shah
- Gajanand Singh
- Surya Thurumella
- Raghavender Tirunahan
- Raghu Tirunahari
- Deep Joshi

New England Eagles

- Tahmid Ahmed
- Bruce Blackwood
- Apurva Maheshram
- Rizwan Mazhar
- Shrey Parmar
- Adil Sardar
- Azher Syed
- Manas Vyas
- Devendra Bishoo
- Marvin Darlington
- Andre McCarthy
- Azher Ali
- Archit Patel
- Bilal Imran
- Hemendra Ramdihal
- Saad Awan
- Kavin Nakkeeran
- Kumar Joseph

New Jersey Somerset Cavaliers

- Yashwant Balaji
- Imrul Hashib
- Chandrapaul Hemraj
- Ali Imran
- Salik Iqbal
- Damion Jacobs
- Ahmed Labib
- Xavier Marshall
- Gudakesh Motie
- Najaf Shah
- Abhishek Prabhu
- Pranav Rao
- Burhan Saeed
- Meet Shah
- Kulwinder Singh
- Taahaa Warraich

New Jersey Stallions

- Manoj Acharya
- Rohan Arvindh
- Derone Davis
- Sadique Henry
- Akshay Homraj
- Saiteja Mukkamalla
- Sachin Mylavarapu
- Paul Palmer
- Hiren Patel
- Karan Patel
- Raymond Ramrattan
- Preet Shah
- Dominique Rikhi
- Jasdeep Singh
- Stephen Wiig
- Rovman Powell

Philadelphians

- Abdullah Syed
- Chiranshu Bhatia
- Trinson Carmichael
- Juanoy Drysdale
- Karima Gore
- Anirudh Immanuel
- Soripul Islam
- Hayat Khan
- Yash Khangura
- Milind Kumar
- Varun Mantha
- Derick Narine
- Liam Plunkett
- Mario Rampersaud
- Syed Veqar
- Abdul Jabbar

Lone Star Athletics

- Ali Bangash
- Hamza Bangash
- Jay Desai
- Derval Green
- Hrrit Hinge
- Shayan Jahangir
- Arya Kannantha
- Hamza Khalid
- Jannisar Khan
- Nitish Kumar
- Shuja Naqvi
- Sidhesh Pathare
- Josh Saripella
- Kamran Shaikh
- Abhinav Sikharam
- Majjid Zubair

Chicago Blasters

- Ankush Agrawal
- Fahad Babar
- Abir Chippa
- S Charith Daggupati
- Shaheer Hassan
- Najam Iqbal
- Pankaj Kampli
- Ashhar Mehdi
- Mohit Patel
- Jay Patel
- Kevin Phillip
- Datta Prakash Y
- Shreyas Ramesh
- Arjun Reddy
- Awais Zia
- Mohammad Waqas

Chicago Tigers

- Ranadeep Aleti
- Saad Ali
- Sunny Bhatti
- Kushal Ganji
- Karan Kumar
- Prateer Mehta
- Rishi Mehta
- Pruthvish Patel
- Manan Patel
- Deepchand Pinnaka
- Ocarie Simms
- Sami Sohail
- Rohit Thete
- Tejas Visal
- Marques Ackerman
- Calvin Savage

Houston Hurricanes

- Huzefa Ahmed
- Gourav Bajaj
- Rayaan Bhagani
- Muneed Choudhary
- Karthik Gattepalli
- Saqlain Haider
- Ali Khan
- Ninad Nimbalkar
- Usman Rafiq
- Rameez Raja
- Hassan Rashid
- Ali Shafiq
- Matthew Tromp
- Tanaf Wasie
- Ashley Nurse
- Mohammad Ilyas
- Sohail Tanvir

Dallas Mustangs

- Corey Anderson
- Sachin Asoka
- Burt Cockley
- Rehman Dar
- Sujith Gowda
- Adnan Haroon
- Naseer Jamali
- Nosthush Kenjige
- Petson Matthews
- Sushant Modani
- Soorya Selvakumar
- Ali Shiekh
- Joshua Tromp
- Abhimanyu Poswal
- Saqib Malhotra
- Hussain Talat
- Sahibzada Farhan

Michigan Cricket Stars

- Arjun Ajbani
- Farhan Ali
- Nauman Anwar
- Theo Barnett
- Haladhara Das
- Umar Eman
- Matthew Forde
- Niaz Khan
- Zia Khan
- Zeeshan Maqsood
- Mohammad Mohsin
- Tirth Patel
- Ryan Scott
- Ezat Ullah
- Arjun Vajjalla
- Christopher van Tull

St. Louis Americans

- Murali Basupalli
- Ahmed Butt
- Sam Das
- Justin Dill
- Dhruv Duggal
- Arnav Jhamb
- Nikhil Kanchan
- Yashodhan Mahajan
- Paras Marwaha
- Bhavya Mehta
- Parth Patel
- Siddharth Saladi
- Luke Schofield
- Siddharth Saladi
- Siddhant Shah
- Ayaan Khan

Bay Blazers

- Arshdeep Brar
- David Bunn
- Saideep Ganesh
- Aarnav Iyer
- Gurbakash Khaira
- Nawaz Khan
- Sanjay Krishnamurthi
- Carmi le Roux
- Vikash Mohan
- Prumjot Panesar
- Abhishek Paradkar
- Angelo Perera
- Navanpreet Brar
- Rusty Theron
- David White
- Mark Deyal

Golden State Grizzlies

- Sami Aslam
- Hammad Azam
- Karan Chandel
- Nihal Desai
- Anish Deshpande
- Ruchir Joshi
- Junaid Malik
- Sheryar Khan
- Shivam Mishra
- Zia Shahzad
- Mohit Nataraj
- Abheyender Singh
- Anshul Singh
- Aditya Srinivas
- Vatsal Vaghela

Hollywood Master Blasters

- Ajay Immadi
- Kanishka Chaugai
- Cody Chetty
- Ayan Desai
- Andrew Dulwatte
- Evan Hewageegana
- Venukalyan Madireddy
- Mrunal Patel
- Timil Patel
- Nisarg Patel
- Dylan Ranatunga
- Basanta Regmi
- Brynley Richards
- Hammad Shahid
- Ravi Timbawala
- Prithu Baskota

San Diego Surf Riders

- Samson Bhatti
- Nikhil Dutta
- Adit Gorawara
- Greg Hay
- Vedant Jain
- Marty Kain
- Kakani Harish
- Sri Krishna
- Zubair Murad
- Abhinay Reddy
- Jaideep Reddy
- Sukhwant Sekhon
- Ajay Sharma
- Devam Shrivastava
- Adnesh Tondale
- Khalid Khan

Seattle Thunderbolts

- Daminda Ranaweera
- Rishi Bhardwaj
- Akhilesh Bodugum
- Aditya Chauhan
- Andries Gous
- Shair Kancherla
- Mudi Prajith
- Manoj Panwar
- Rohan Posanipally
- Jagroop Raina
- Shubham Ranjane
- Phani Simhadri
- Harmeet Singh
- Rahul Singh
- Shadley van Schalkwyk

Silicon Valley Strikers

- Arsh Buch
- Unmukt Chand
- Narsingh Deonarine
- Gary Graham
- Rahul Jariwala
- Shehan Jayasuriya
- Saurabh Netravalkar
- Roshon Primus
- Raymon Reifer
- Srinivas Raghavan
- Adil Shivakumar
- Kulvinder Singh
- Pranay Suri
- Dev Thadani
- Rushil Ugarkar
- Zahid Zakhail

SoCal Lashings

- Iftikhar Ahmed
- Muditha Fernando
- Deepak Gosain
- Elmore Hutchinson
- Taha Jamal
- Ripal Patel
- Abhimanyu Rajp (c)
- Akash Singh
- Harman Sandhir
- Sanchit Sandhu
- S Rohit Sharma
- Harpreet Singh
- Muhammad Zaid
- Jatinder Singh
- Zaid Tariq
- Katene Clarke
- Zohaib Ahmed

== Results ==
=== Atlantic Conference ===
Home \ Away	NEE	NJSC	NJS	EST	MY	TP	DCH	AF	AL	FLL	MR	OG
Eagles	—	0–1	0–2	0–2	1–1	0–2	1–1	0–1	–	–	–	1–0
Cavaliers	1–0	—	0–2	1–1	1–1	1–1	0–2	–	0–1	–	0–1	–
Stallions	2–0	2–0	—	2–0	0–2	2–0	2–0	1–0	–	1–0	–	–
Titans	2–0	1–1	0–2	—	0–2	0–2	2–0	–	–	1–0	–	0–1
Yorkers	1–1	1–1	2–0	2–0	—	1–1	2–0	–	1–0	–	0–1	–
Philadelphians	2–0	1–1	0–2	2–0	1–1	—	1–1	–	0–1	–	0–1	–
Hawks	1–1	2–0	0–2	0–2	0–2	1–1	—	0–1	–	1–0	–	–
Fire	1–0	–	0–1	–	–	–	1–0	—	1–1	2–1	1–1	3–0
Lightning	–	1–0	–	–	0–1	1–0	–	1–2	—	1–0	1–2	3–0
Lions	–	–	0–1	0–1	–	–	0–1	1–2	0–1	—	1–2	2–1
Raptors	–	1–0	–	–	1–0	1–0	–	1–1	2–1	2–1	—	1–1
Galaxy	0–1	–	–	1–0	–	–	–	0–3	0–3	1–2	1–1	—

Source: Minor League Cricket
Legend: Blue = home team win; Yellow = draw; Red = away team win.

=== Pacific Conference ===
Home \ Away	SVS	EBB	HMB	SCL	GSG	SDR	ST	LSA	CB	CT	DM	HH	MCS	SLA
Strikers	—	1–1	2–0	2–0	2–0	2–0	2–0	–	–	1–0	–	1–0	1–0	–
Blazers	1–1	—	2–0	1–0	2–0	2–0	1–1	1–0	1–0	–	0–1	–	–	–
Master Blasters	0–2	0–2	—	0–2	0–1	1–1	0–2	–	1–0	–	0–1	–	0–1	–
Lashings	0–2	0–1	2–0	—	0–2	2–0	0–2	0–1	–	1–0	–	0–1	–	–
Grizzlies	0–2	0–2	1–0	2–0	—	2–0	0–2	–	1–0	–	0–1	–	1–0	–
Riders	0–2	0–2	1–1	0–2	0–2	—	0–2	–	–	0–1	–	1–0	–	0–1
Thunderbolts	0–2	1–1	2–0	2–0	2–0	2–0	—	1–0	–	–	–	–	–	1–0
Athletics	–	0–1	–	1–0	–	–	0–1	—	0–0	1–1	0–2	0–2	0–1	0–2
Chicago Blasters	–	0–1	0–1	–	0–1	–	–	0–0	—	0–2	0–1	0–2	0–2	0–1
Tigers	0–1	–	–	0–1	–	1–0	–	1–1	2–0	—	1–1	1–0	1–0	1–1
Mustangs	–	1–0	1–0	–	1–0	–	–	2–0	1–0	1–1	—	2–0	1–1	2–0
Hurricanes	0–1	–	–	1–0	–	0–1	–	2–0	2–0	0–1	0–2	—	1–1	1–1
Stars	0–1	–	1–0	–	0–1	–	–	1–0	2–0	0–1	1–1	1–1	—	1–1
Americans	–	–	–	–	–	1–0	0–1	2–0	1–0	1–1	1–1	0–2	1–1	—

Source: Minor League Cricket
Legend: Blue = home team win; Yellow = draw; Red = away team win.

== League stage ==
The league stage ran from June 25 to August 14. The schedule and venues of the playoffs was announced on August 4 by Major League Cricket.

The season had a total prize pool of $350,000, with the winner taking home $150,000.

=== Atlantic Conference ===
==== Southern Division ====
Pos	Team	Pld	W	L	NR	Pts	NRR
1	Atlanta Fire	14	9	4	1	19	1.148
2	Morrisville Raptors	14	9	4	1	19	0.459
3	Atlanta Lightning	14	8	4	2	18	1.304
4	Ft. Lauderdale Lions	14	4	9	1	9	−1.764
5	Orlando Galaxy	14	3	10	1	7	−1.286

Updated to match(es) played on 8 July 2022. Source: Major League Cricket
- Top two teams advance to the Quarterfinals
- advances to Quarterfinals to play 2nd-place Eastern Division team
- advances to Quarterfinals to play 1st-place Eastern Division team
Division matches

25 June 2022
10:00 AM (EST)
Scorecard

Ft. Lauderdale Lions; 128/8 (20 overs)	v	Atlanta Fire; 131/4 (13.2 overs)
Kiran Vade 42 (25); Amila Aponso 3/21 (4 overs)		Aaron Jones 40* (28); Ujjwal Vinnakota 2/20 (3 overs)

Atlanta Fire won by 6 wickets (with 40 balls remaining)
Broward County Stadium, Florida
Umpires: David Maitland and Josef Baptiste
Player of the match: Rahkeem Cornwall

- Ft. Lauderdale Lions won the toss and elected to bat

25 June 2022
2:30 PM (EST)
Scorecard

Orlando Galaxy; 0/0 (0 overs)	v	Morrisville Raptors; 0/0 (0 overs)

Broward County Stadium, Florida
Umpires: Mark Ebanks and Max Diah
Player of the match: Play abandoned

- Match was washed out

26 June 2022
7:00 AM (EST)
Scorecard

Atlanta Fire; 207/6 (20 overs)	v	Orlando Galaxy; 115/6 (20 overs)
Rahkeem Cornwall 93 (41); Dimitri Adams 2/26 (3 overs)		Hardik Desai 39* (37); Evroy Dyer 2/24 (4 overs)

Atlanta Fire won by 92 runs
Broward County Stadium, Florida
Umpires: Alwin Salmon and David Maitland
Player of the match: Rahkeem Cornwall

- Orlando Galaxy won the toss and elected to bowl

26 June 2022
10:00 AM (EST)
Scorecard

Morrisville Raptors; 127/5 (14 overs)	v	Ft. Lauderdale Lions; 129/5 (13.3 overs)
Lahiru Milantha 49 (25); Roy Silva 2/20 (3 overs)		Roy Silva 67 (28); Siva Kumar 2/18 (3 overs)

Ft. Lauderdale Lions won by 5 wickets (with 3 balls remaining, D/L)
Broward County Stadium, Florida
Umpires: Mark Ebanks and Josef Baptiste
Player of the match: Roy Silva

- Morrisville Raptors won the toss and elected to bat
- Play reduced to 14 overs per side

1 July 2022
6:00 PM (EST)
Scorecard

NJ Somerset Cavaliers; 132/8 (20 overs)	v	Morrisville Raptors; 136/7 (20 overs)
Meet Shah 33 (22); Kiran Saravanakumar 4/28 (4 overs)		Lahiru Milantha 42 (34); Damion Jacobs 3/25 (4 overs)

Morrisville Raptors won by 3 wickets
Church Street Park, North Carolina
Umpires: Tarak Janapareddy and Vijaya Mallela
Player of the match: Kiran Saravanakumar

- Morrisville Raptors won the toss and elected to bowl

2 July 2022
11:30 AM (EST)
Scorecard

Empire State Titans; 164/4 (20 overs)	v	Ft. Lauderdale Lions; 127/8 (20 overs)
Ariful Haque 58* (27); Roy Silva 2/17 (4 overs)		Ujjwal Vinnakota 31 (25); Ariful Haque 3/16 (4 overs)

Empire State Titans won by 37 runs
Prairie View Cricket Complex, Houston
Umpires: Aveek Gangopadhyay and Colin Edwards
Player of the match: Ariful Haque

- Ft. Lauderdale Lions won the toss and elected to bowl

2 July 2022
1:00 PM (EST)
Scorecard

Atlanta Lightning; 202/4 (20 overs)	v	NJ Somerset Cavaliers; 135 (18.3 overs)
Shamar Springer 71* (31); Najaf Shah 1/30 (4 overs)		Xavier Marshall 61 (47); Kyle Phillip 3/12 (3 overs)

Atlanta Lightning won by 67 runs
Church Street Park, North Carolina
Umpires: Rahul Patwardhan and Vijaya Mallela
Player of the match: Shamar Springer

- NJ Somerset Cavaliers won the toss and elected to bowl

2 July 2022
2:30 PM (EST)
Scorecard

New Jersey Stallions; 167/7 (20 overs)	v	Atlanta Fire; 158/8 (20 overs)
Dominique Rikhi 43 (27); Rahkeem Cornwall 3/28 (4 overs)		Jahmar Hamilton 39 (21); Manoj Acharya 4/22 (4 overs)

New Jersey Stallions won by 9 runs
Prairie View Cricket Complex, Houston
Umpires: Matin Inamdar and Bryan Caine
Player of the match: Dominique Rikhi

- New Jersey Stallions won the toss and elected to bat

2 July 2022
5:30 PM (EST)
Scorecard

The Philadelphians; 145/6 (20 overs)	v	Morrisville Raptors; 145/5 (20 overs)
Liam Plunkett 41* (28); Siva Kumar 2/15 (4 overs)		Obus Pienaar 43* (34); Liam Plunkett 2/28 (4 overs)

Morrisville Raptors won in the Super Over tiebreaker by 10 runs
Church Street Park, North Carolina
Umpires: Tarak Janapareddy and Vijaya Mallela
Player of the match: Colin Archibald

- Morrisville Raptors won the toss and elected to bowl
- Super Over: Morrisville Raptors 14/0 (1.0), The Philadelphians 4/2 (0.5).

3 July 2022
10:00 AM (EST)
Scorecard

Ft. Lauderdale Lions; 86/8 (20 overs)	v	DC Hawks; 87/5 (15.4 overs)
Kiran Vade 23 (20); Shamy Ghotra 3/13 (4 overs)		Neil Narvekar 36 (33); Shamarie Brown 3/20 (3.4 overs)

DC Hawks won by 5 wickets (with 26 balls remaining)
Prairie View Cricket Complex, Houston
Umpires: Colin Edwards and Sadiq Khoja
Player of the match: Pranto Ahmed

- DC Hawks won the toss and elected to bowl

3 July 2022
11:30 AM (EST)
Scorecard

New England Eagles; 142/8 (20 overs)	v	Atlanta Fire; 143/6 (17.1 overs)
Saad Awan 50 (46); Corné Dry 3/32 (4 overs)		Rahkeem Cornwall 40 (21); Devendra Bishoo 2/32 (4 overs)

Atlanta Fire won by 4 wickets (with 17 balls remaining)
Prairie View Cricket Complex, Houston
Umpires: Rushane Samuels and Rakesh Jain
Player of the match: Corné Dry

- Atlanta Fire won the toss and elected to bowl

3 July 2022
1:30 PM (EST)
Scorecard

Empire State Titans; 109/9 (20 overs)	v	Orlando Galaxy; 110/6 (18.4 overs)
Savan Patel 32 (30); Sumit Sehrawat 3/15 (4 overs)		Rohit Dutchin 39 (24); Vivek Ravichandran 3/24 (3 overs)

Orlando Galaxy won by 4 wickets (with 10 balls remaining)
Prairie View Cricket Complex, Houston
Umpires: Colin Edwards and Partha Pattanaik
Player of the match: Sumit Sehrawat

- Empire State Titans won the toss and elected to bat

3 July 2022
2:30 PM (EST)
Scorecard

Manhattan Yorkers; 162/5 (20 overs)	v	Atlanta Lightning; 134 (18.3 overs)
Danesh Patel 54* (49); Khary Pierre 2/17 (4 overs)		Mark Parchment 29 (17); Bhaskar Yadram 4/28 (4 overs)

Manhattan Yorkers won by 28 runs
Church Street Park, North Carolina
Umpires: Alvin Burnett and Vijaya Mallela
Player of the match: Bhaskar Yadram

- Atlanta Lightning won the toss and elected to bowl

4 July 2022
10:00 AM (EST)
Scorecard

New Jersey Stallions; 187/5 (20 overs)	v	Ft. Lauderdale Lions; 109 (18.5 overs)
Anthony Bramble 57* (34); Elton Tucker Jr. 1/21 (4 overs)		Ujjwal Vinnakota 27 (26); Dominique Rikhi 3/17 (4 overs)

New Jersey Stallions won by 78 runs
Prairie View Cricket Complex, Houston
Umpires: Aveek Gangopadhyay and Sadiq Khoja
Player of the match: Dominique Rikhi

- New Jersey Stallions won the toss and elected to bat

4 July 2022
10:00 AM (EST)
Scorecard

Atlanta Lightning; 186/3 (20 overs)	v	The Philadelphians; 68/9 (13.4 overs)
Sagar Patel 82* (53); Milind Kumar 1/34 (4 overs)		Jonathan Foo 31 (16); Siddharth Matani 4/6 (4 overs)

Atlanta Lightning won by 118 runs
Church Street Park, North Carolina
Umpires: Tarak Janapareddy and Vijaya Mallela
Player of the match: Siddharth Matani

- The Philadelphians won the toss and elected to bowl

4 July 2022
2:30 PM (EST)
Scorecard

Atlanta Fire; 141/6 (20 overs)	v	DC Hawks; 136/9 (20 overs)
Jahmar Hamilton 74* (45); Sarabjit Ladda 4/19 (4 overs)		Neil Narvekar 38 (25); Ridwan Palash 2/7 (2 overs)

Atlanta Fire won by 5 runs
Prairie View Cricket Complex, Houston
Umpires: Falit Mehta and Aveek Gangopadhyay
Player of the match: Jahmar Hamilton

- Atlanta Fire won the toss and elected to bat

4 July 2022
3:30 PM (EST)
Scorecard

New England Eagles; 152/9 (20 overs)	v	Orlando Galaxy; 149/8 (20 overs)
Apurva Maheshram 27 (30); Dimitri Adams 4/27 (4 overs)		Manav Patel 44 (18); Marvin Darlington 3/18 (4 overs)

New England Eagles won by 3 runs
Prairie View Cricket Complex, Houston
Umpires: Colin Edwards and Partha Pattanaik
Player of the match: Marvin Darlington

- New England Eagles won the toss and elected to bat

4 July 2022
4:30 PM (EST)
Scorecard

Morrisville Raptors; 190/6 (20 overs)	v	Manhattan Yorkers; 183 (19.5 overs)
Vinothkumar Kandaswamy 61 (44); Raj Patel 2/15 (3 overs)		Bhaskar Yadram 44 (27); Obus Pienaar 3/26 (4 overs)

Morrisville Raptors won by 7 runs
Church Street Park, North Carolina
Umpires: Alvin Burnett and Vijaya Mallela
Player of the match: Obus Pienaar

- Morrisville Raptors won the toss and elected to bat

9 July 2022
11:30 AM (EST)
Scorecard

Orlando Galaxy; 141 (17.5 overs)	v	Ft. Lauderdale Lions; 117 (19.2 overs)
Tagenarine Chanderpaul 61 (42); Atul Iyer 4/14 (4 overs)		Herlando Johnson 29 (27); Manav Patel 2/12 (3.2 overs)

Orlando Galaxy won by 24 runs
Silverstar Recreation Center, Florida
Umpires: Mark Ebanks and David Maitland
Player of the match: Tagenarine Chanderpaul

- Orlando Galaxy won the toss and elected to bat

10 July 2022
11:30 AM (EST)
Scorecard

Ft. Lauderdale Lions; 218/5 (20 overs)	v	Orlando Galaxy; 188/9 (20 overs)
Javelle Glen 100 (40); Sumit Sehrawat 2/46 (4 overs)		Meetul Patel 52 (41); Masood Mohamed 3/25 (4 overs)

Ft. Lauderdale Lions won by 30 runs
Silverstar Recreation Center, Florida
Umpires: David Maitland and Josef Baptiste
Player of the match: Javelle Glen

- Ft. Lauderdale Lions won the toss and elected to bat

16 July 2022
10:00 AM (EST)
Scorecard

Atlanta Lightning; 130/9 (18 overs)	v	Ft. Lauderdale Lions; 124/5 (18 overs)
Khary Pierre 48 (35); Masood Mohamed 2/14 (3 overs)		Roy Silva 39 (25); Khary Pierre 2/9 (3 overs)

Atlanta Lightning won by 6 runs
Broward County Stadium, Florida
Umpires: Max Diah and Mark Ebanks
Player of the match: Khary Pierre

- Ft. Lauderdale Lions won the toss and elected to bowl
- Play was reduced to 18 overs per side

16 July 2022
2:30 PM (EST)
Scorecard

Atlanta Lightning; 155/6 (20 overs)	v	Orlando Galaxy; 100/7 (17 overs)
Sagar Patel 41 (37); Manav Patel 3/36 (4 overs)		Meetul Patel 34 (31); Siddarth Matani 2/14 (4 overs)

Atlanta Lightning won by 55 runs
Broward County Stadium, Florida
Umpires: Mark Ebanks and Josef Baptiste
Player of the match: Sagar Patel

- Atlanta Lightning won the toss and elected to bat
- Play reduced to 17 overs for the Orlando Galaxy

17 July 2022
7:30 AM (EST)
Scorecard

Ft. Lauderdale Lions; 147 (18 overs)	v	Orlando Galaxy; 138/3 (18 overs)
Javelle Glen 53 (34); Rohit Dutchin 5/9 (2 overs)		Meetul Patel 57 (45); Roy Silva 2/29 (4 overs)

Ft. Lauderdale Lions won by 9 runs
Broward County Stadium, Florida
Umpires: Max Diah and Mark Ebanks
Player of the match: Rohit Dutchin

- Ft. Lauderdale Lions won the toss and elected to bat
- Play reduced to 18 overs per side

17 July 2022
11:30 AM (EST)
Scorecard

Atlanta Lightning; 66/1 (10.5 overs)	v	Ft. Lauderdale Lions
Mark Parchment 37* (30); Roy Silva 1/10 (2 overs)

Play abandoned
Broward County Stadium, Florida
Umpires: Josef Baptiste and Max Diah

- Ft. Lauderdale Lions won the toss and elected to bowl
- Rain stopped play

23 July 2022
2:00 PM (EST)
Scorecard

Orlando Galaxy; 149/6 (20 overs)	v	Atlanta Lightning; 151/2 (18 overs)
Tagenarine Chanderpaul 53 (46); Khary Pierre 2/15 (3 overs)		Mark Parchment 72* (58); Sumit Sehrawat 1/23 (3 overs)

Atlanta Lightning won by 8 wickets (with 12 balls remaining)
Atlanta Cricket Fields, Georgia
Umpires: Sandip Gondhalekar and Conrad Rogers
Player of the match: Mark Parchment

- Orlando Galaxy won the toss and elected to bat

23 July 2022
5:30 PM (EST)

Morrisville Raptors; 0/0 (0 overs)	v	Ft. Lauderdale Lions; 0/0 (0 overs)

Play abandoned
Church Street Park, North Carolina
Umpires: Tarak Janapareddy and Vijaya Mallela

24 July 2022
10:00 AM (EST)
Scorecard

Atlanta Fire; 226/6 (20 overs)	v	Orlando Galaxy; 141 (19.1 overs)
Rahkeem Cornwall 83 (34); Matthew Comerie 2/29 (4 overs)		Tagenarine Chanderpaul 31 (30); Corné Dry 4/15 (3.1 overs)

Atlanta Fire won by 85 runs
Atlanta Cricket Fields, Georgia
Umpires: Rushane Samuels and Sandip Gondhalekar
Player of the match: Rahkeem Cornwall

- Atlanta Fire won the toss and elected to bat

24 July 2022
11:00 AM (EST)

Morrisville Raptors; 0/0 (0 overs)	v	Ft. Lauderdale Lions; 0/0 (0 overs)

Play abandoned
Church Street Park, North Carolina
Umpires: Rahul Patwardhan and Vijaya Mallela

30 July 2022
2:00 PM (EST)
Scorecard

Atlanta Fire; 164/9 (20 overs)	v	Atlanta Lightning; 145/3 (17 overs)
Steven Taylor 56 (36); Heath Richards 2/11 (2 overs)		Hanchard Hamilton 54 (48); Steven Taylor 1/18 (2 overs)

Atlanta Lightning won by 7 wickets
Atlanta Cricket Fields, Georgia
Umpires: Conrad Rogers and Nur Uddin
Player of the match: Hanchard Hamilton

- Atlanta Fire won the toss and elected to bat
- Play reduced to 17 overs for the Atlanta Lightning, revised target 139

30 July 2022
2:00 PM (EST)
Scorecard

Orlando Galaxy; 151/6 (20 overs)	v	Morrisville Raptors; 155/5 (17.5 overs)
Dimitri Adams 44* (38); Aditya Padala 3/38 (4 overs)		Lahiru Milantha 51 (39); Isuru Kuruwitage 3/32 (3.5 overs)

Morrisville Raptors won by 5 wickets (with 13 balls remaining)
Silverstar Recreation Center, Florida
Umpires: David Maitland and Josef Baptiste
Player of the match: Lahiru Milantha

- Orlando Galaxy won the toss and elected to bat

31 July 2022
10:30 AM (EST)
Scorecard

Orlando Galaxy; 124 (18.3 overs)	v	Morrisville Raptors; 119 (19.3 overs)
Rohit Dutchin 53 (29); Karthikeya Jagadish 5/21 (4 overs)		Obus Pienaar 30 (16); Rohit Dutchin 2/11 (3.3 overs)

Orlando Galaxy won by 5 runs
Silverstar Recreation Center, Florida
Umpires: David Maitland and Mark Ebanks
Player of the match: Rohit Dutchin

- Orlando Galaxy won the toss and elected to bat

31 July 2022
2:00 PM (EST)
Scorecard

Atlanta Lightning; 193/8 (20 overs)	v	Atlanta Fire; 196/4 (19.2 overs)
Mark Parchment 85 (51); Evroy Dyer 3/47 (4 overs)		Rahkeem Cornwall 59 (27); Heath Richards 3/36 (4 overs)

Atlanta Fire won by 6 wickets (with 4 balls remaining)
Atlanta Cricket Fields, Georgia
Umpires: Nur Uddin and Aditya Gajjar
Player of the match: Rahkeem Cornwall

- Atlanta Fire won the toss and elected to bowl

31 July 2022
3:00 PM (EST)
Scorecard

Morrisville Raptors; 225/8 (20 overs)	v	Ft. Lauderdale Lions; 117 (18.2 overs)
Obus Pienaar 100 (38); Shuaib Syed 4/34 (4 overs)		Danza Hyatt 68 (50); Karthikeya Jagadish 3/29 (4 overs)

Morrisville Raptors won by 108 runs
Silverstar Recreation Center, Florida
Umpires: David Maitland and Josef Baptiste
Player of the match: Obus Pienaar

- Morrisville Raptors won the toss and elected to bat

6 August 2022
10:00 AM (EST)
Scorecard

Atlanta Lightning; 188/7 (20 overs)	v	Morrisville Raptors; 190/8 (19.5 overs)
Hanchard Hamilton 72 (47); Obus Pienaar 3/32 (3.5 overs)		Dane Piedt 48* (34); Heath Richards 4/38 (4 overs)

Morrisville Raptors won by 2 wickets (with 1 ball remaining)
Atlanta Cricket Fields, Georgia
Umpires: Rushane Samuels and Aditya Gajjar
Player of the match: Dane Piedt

- Morrisville Raptors won the toss and elected to bowl

6 August 2022
2:00 PM (EST)
Scorecard

Orlando Galaxy; 105 (18.3 overs)	v	Atlanta Fire; 106/4 (12.4 overs)
Dimitri Adams 35* (40); Evroy Dyer 3/14 (3 overs)		Rahkeem Cornwall 37 (14); Adam Khan 1/7 (1.4 overs)

Atlanta Fire won by 6 wickets (with 44 balls remaining)
Atlanta Cricket Fields, Georgia
Umpires: Aditya Gajjar and Rushane Samuels
Player of the match: Rahkeem Cornwall

- Orlando Galaxy won the toss and elected to bat

7 August 2022
10:00 AM (EST)
Scorecard

Morrisville Raptors; 203/5 (20 overs)	v	Atlanta Fire; 176/9 (20 overs)
Lahiru Milantha 91 (47); Rahkeem Cornwall 3/25 (4 overs)		Jahmar Hamilton 31 (15); Rohan Phadke 2/20 (2 overs)

Morrisville Raptors won by 27 runs
Atlanta Cricket Fields, Georgia
Umpires: Nur Uddin and Rushane Samuels
Player of the match: Lahiru Milantha

- Atlanta Fire won the toss and elected to bowl

7 August 2022
2:00 PM (EST)
Scorecard

Orlando Galaxy; 127 (19 overs)	v	Atlanta Lightning; 128/2 (14.5 overs)
Rohit Dutchin 49 (37); Kyle Phillip 4/20 (4 overs)		Cassius Burton 53* (36); Hardik Desai 2/17 (2 overs)

Atlanta Lightning won by 8 wickets (with 31 balls remaining)
Atlanta Cricket Fields, Georgia
Umpires: Sandip Gondhalekar and Conrad Rogers
Player of the match: Kyle Phillip

- Orlando Galaxy won the toss and elected to bat

12 August 2022
2:00 PM (EST)
Scorecard

Morrisville Raptors; 0/0 (0 overs)	v	Ft. Lauderdale Lions; 0/0 (0 overs)

Morrisville Raptors won by forfeit
Church Street Park, North Carolina
Umpires: Rahul Patwardhan and Vijaya Mallela

12 August 2022
6:00 PM (EST)
Scorecard

Morrisville Raptors; 129 (17.5 overs)	v	Atlanta Fire; 132/5 (19.1 overs)
Lahiru Milantha 60 (51); Ateendra Subramanian 3/26 (2.5 overs)		Nasir Hossain 38 (33); Matthew Forde 2/28 (3.1 overs)

Atlanta Fire won by 5 wickets (with 5 balls remaining)
Church Street Park, North Carolina
Umpires: Rahul Patwardhan and Vijaya Mallela
Player of the match: Nasir Hossain

- Atlanta Fire won the toss and elected to bowl

13 August 2022
1:00 PM (EST)
Scorecard

Atlanta Fire; 161/9 (20 overs)	v	Ft. Lauderdale Lions; 167/4 (20 overs)
Rahkeem Cornwall 31 (19); Atul Iyer 3/19 (4 overs)		Javelle Glen 83* (48); Nasir Hossain 2/28 (4 overs)

Ft. Lauderdale Lions won by 6 wickets
Church Street Park, North Carolina
Umpires: Alvin Burnett and Vijaya Mallela
Player of the match: Javelle Glen

- Atlanta Fire won the toss and elected to bat

13 August 2022
5:30 PM (EST)
Scorecard

Atlanta Lightning; 178/5 (20 overs)	v	Morrisville Raptors; 179/3 (20 overs)
Hanchard Hamilton 74* (45); Matthew Forde 3/41 (4 overs)		Vinothkumar Kandaswamy 54 (44); Khary Pierre 1/21 (4 overs)

Morrisville Raptors won by 7 wickets
Church Street Park, North Carolina
Umpires: Rahul Patwardhan and Vijaya Mallela
Player of the match: Vinothkumar Kandaswamy

- Morrisville Raptors won the toss and elected to bowl

14 August 2022
10:00 AM (EST)
Scorecard

Atlanta Fire; 183/4 (20 overs)	v	Ft. Lauderdale Lions; 133/7 (20 overs)
Rahkeem Cornwall 86 (50); Shuaib Syed 3/24 (4 overs)		Ujjwal Vinnakota 50* (27); Nasir Hossain 1/2 (2 overs)

Atlanta Fire won by 50 runs
Church Street Park, North Carolina
Umpires: Alvin Burnett and Vijaya Mallela
Player of the match: Rahkeem Cornwall

- Ft. Lauderdale Lions won the toss and elected to bowl

14 August 2022
2:30 PM (EST)
Scorecard

Morrisville Raptors; 146/6 (20 overs)	v	Atlanta Lightning; 147/2 (15.1 overs)
Obus Pienaar 53 (32); Siddarth Matani 1/7 (2 overs)		Mark Parchment 68* (45); Murali Ankaraju 1/24 (3 overs)

Atlanta Lightning won by 8 wickets (with 29 balls remaining)
Church Street Park, North Carolina
Umpires: Rahul Patwardhan and Vijaya Mallela
Player of the match: Mark Parchment

- Morrisville Raptors won the toss and elected to bat

==== Eastern Division ====
Pos	Team	Pld	W	L	NR	Pts	NRR
1	New Jersey Stallions	14	12	2	0	24	0.794
2	Manhattan Yorkers	14	10	4	0	20	1.702
3	The Philadelphians	14	7	7	0	14	−0.177
4	Empire State Titans	14	6	8	0	12	−0.273
5	DC Hawks	14	5	9	0	10	−0.293
6	NJ Somerset Cavaliers	14	4	9	1	9	−0.969
7	New England Eagles	14	3	10	1	7	−0.887

Updated to match(es) played on 8 July 2022. Source: Major League Cricket
- Top two teams advance to the Quarterfinals
- advances to Quarterfinals to play 2nd-place Southern Division team
- advances to Quarterfinals to play 1st-place Southern Division team
Division matches

25 June 2022
1:30 PM (EST)
Scorecard

Empire State Titans; 164/5 (20 overs)	v	NJ Somerset Cavaliers; 98/9 (20 overs)
Jaladh Dua 47 (30); Navin Stewart 2/26 (4 overs)		Imrul Hashib 39* (26); Chintan Patel 3/11 (4 overs)

Empire State Titans won by 66 runs
Idlewild Park, New York
Umpires: Roan McFarlane and Bryan Caine
Player of the match: Tapash Baisya

- NJ Somerset Cavaliers won the toss and elected to bowl

25 June 2022
2:00 PM (EST)
Scorecard

New England Eagles; 131/9 (20 overs)	v	The Philadelphians; 133/5 (13.1 overs)
Apurva Maheshram 48 (43); Chiranshu Bhatia 5/21 (4 overs)		Abdullah Syed 59 (27); Devendra Bishoo 3/31 (4 overs)

The Philadelphians won by 5 wickets (with 41 balls remaining)
Exton Park, Pennsylvania
Umpires: Mihir Patel and Ritesh Patel
Player of the match: Chiranshu Bhatia

- The Philadelphians won the toss and elected to bowl.

25 June 2022
2:30 PM (EST)
Scorecard

New Jersey Stallions; 102/9 (20 overs)	v	Manhattan Yorkers; 103/3 (16.4 overs)
Paul Palmer 43 (39); Bhaskar Yadram 3/17 (4 overs)		Yasir Mohammad 52 (44); Sachin Mylavarapu 1/12 (4 overs)

Manhattan Yorkers won by 7 wickets (with 23 balls remaining)
Mercer County Park, New Jersey
Umpires: Colin Edwards and Dimapal Patel
Player of the match: Yasir Mohammad

- New Jersey Stallions won the toss and elected to bat

26 June 2022
7:30 AM (EST)
Scorecard

Manhattan Yorkers; 146/9 (20 overs)	v	Empire State Titans; 91/9 (20 overs)
Raj Bhavsar 35 (25); Ariful Haque 3/19 (4 overs)		Monank Patel 22 (16); Bhaskar Yadram 2/15 (4 overs)

Manhattan Yorkers won by 55 runs
Mercer County Park, New Jersey
Umpires: Mihir Patel and Colin Edwards
Player of the match: Raj Bhavsar

- Empire State Titans won the toss and elected to bowl

26 June 2022
10:30 AM (EST)
Scorecard

NJ Somerset Cavaliers; 163/5 (20 overs)	v	New Jersey Stallions; 165/7 (20 overs)
Richard Allen 60 (43); Sachin Mylavarapu 1/27 (4 overs)		Saiteja Mukkamalla 66* (51); Navin Stewart 4/33 (4 overs)

New Jersey Stallions won by 3 wickets
Mercer County Park, New Jersey
Umpires: Mihir Patel and Colin Edwards
Player of the match: Saiteja Mukkamalla

- New Jersey Stallions won the toss and elected to bowl

26 June 2022
1:00 PM (EST)
Scorecard

New England Eagles; 111/6 (20 overs)	v	DC Hawks; 82/9 (16.5 overs)
Hemendra Ramdihal 44 (43); Naseer Islam 2/13 (3 overs)		Bipul Sharma 34 (23); Hemendra Ramdihal 4/6 (4 overs)

New England Eagles won by 29 runs
Exton Park, Pennsylvania
Umpires: Ritesh Patel and Bryan Caine
Player of the match: Hemendra Ramdihal

- New England Eagles won the toss and elected to bat

2 July 2022
10:00 AM (EST)
Scorecard

DC Hawks; 136/8 (20 overs)	v	New England Eagles; 129/6 (20 overs)
Ritwik Behera 33 (36); Hemendra Ramdihal 2/14 (4 overs)		Andre McCarthy 49 (35); Sarabjit Ladda 2/17 (4 overs)

DC Hawks won by 7 runs
Prairie View Cricket Complex, Houston
Umpires: Matin Inamdar and Partha Pattanaik
Player of the match: Pranto Ahmed

- New England Eagles won the toss and elected to bowl

3 July 2022
1:00 PM (EST)
Scorecard

NJ Somerset Cavaliers; 142/8 (20 overs)	v	The Phildelphians; 143/6 (17.1 overs)
Richard Allen 67 (33); Milind Kumar 3/33 (4 overs)		Karima Gore 50 (38); Najaf Shah 2/27 (4 overs)

The Philadelphians won by 4 wickets (with 17 balls remaining)
Church Street Park, North Carolina
Umpires: Alvin Burnett and Vijaya Mallela
Player of the match: Karima Gore

- NJ Somerset Cavaliers won the toss and elected to bat

9 July 2022
11:00 AM (EST)
Scorecard

New Jersey Stallions; 161/4 (20 overs)	v	New England Eagles; 149/7 (20 overs)
Paul Palmer 63 (35); Marvin Darlington 1/26 (4 overs)		Andre McCarthy 33 (34); Raymond Ramrattan 2/28 (4 overs)

New Jersey Stallions won by 12 runs
Keney Park, Connecticut
Umpires: Mangesh Rane and Saravanakumar Venkatesan
Player of the match: Paul Palmer

- New Jersey Stallions won the toss and elected to bat

9 July 2022
11:00 AM (EST)
Scorecard

Empire State Titans; 189/6 (20 overs)	v	The Philadelphians; 190/5 (19 overs)
Savan Patel 46 (26); Liam Plunkett 2/25 (4 overs)		Chiranshu Bhatia 56 (27); Vivek Ravichandran 2/30 (3 overs)

The Philadelphians won by 5 wickets (with 6 balls remaining)
Idlewild Park, New York
Umpires: Roan McFarlane and Erfanullah Syed
Player of the match: Chiranshu Bhatia

- The Philadelphians won the toss and elected to bowl

9 July 2022
12:00 PM (EST)
Scorecard

NJ Somerset Cavaliers; 105/8 (20 overs)	v	Manhattan Yorkers; 107/0 (8.1 overs)
Meet Shah 26 (30); John Campbell 2/7 (4 overs)		John Campbell 85* (32); Umaid Asif 0/16 (2 overs)

Manhattan Yorkers won by 10 wickets (with 95 balls remaining)
Mercer County Park, New Jersey
Umpires: Mihir Patel and Colin Edwards
Player of the match: John Campbell

- Manhattan Yorkers won the toss and elected to bowl

10 July 2022
11:00 AM (EST)
Scorecard

New Jersey Stallions; 129/8 (20 overs)	v	New England Eagles; 116/4 (20 overs)
Paul Palmer 33 (28); Andre McCarthy 3/19 (4 overs)		Marvin Darlington 38* (28); Sachin Mylavarapu 2/23 (4 overs)

New Jersey Stallions won by 13 runs
Keney Park, Connecticut
Umpires: Mangesh Rane and Jatin Karvir
Player of the match: Raymond Ramrattan

- New England Eagles won the toss and elected to bowl

10 July 2022
2:30 PM (EST)
Scorecard

NJ Somerset Cavaliers; 233/4 (20 overs)	v	Empire State Titans; 160/9 (20 overs)
Chandrapaul Hemraj 130 (54); Ariful Haque 2/49 (4 overs)		Gauranshu Sharma 42 (25); Imrul Hashib 3/32 (4 overs)

NJ Somerset Cavaliers won by 73 runs
Howe Athletic Complex, New Jersey
Umpires: Mihir Patel and Ritesh Patel
Player of the match: Chandrapaul Hemraj

- NJ Somerset Cavaliers won the toss and elected to bat

16 July 2022
11:00 AM (EST)
Scorecard

New Jersey Stallions; 115 (18.2 overs)	v	Manhattan Yorkers; 119/9 (18.5 overs)
Jonathan Carter 25 (18); Noman Iftikhar 3/24 (4 overs)		Bhaskar Yadram 51 (33); Jonathan Carter 4/24 (4 overs)

Manhattan Yorkers won by 1 wicket (with 7 balls remaining)
Mercer County Park, New Jersey
Umpires: Mihir Patel and Dimpal Patel
Player of the match: Bhaskar Yadram

- Manhattan Yorkers won the toss and elected to bowl

16 July 2022
2:00 PM (EST)
Scorecard

Empire State Titans; 99 (19.2 overs)	v	DC Hawks; 80 (17 overs)
Ariful Haque 25 (19); Bipul Sharma 2/9 (4 overs)		Bipul Sharma 29 (25); Ariful Haque 3/14 (4 overs)

Empire State Titans won by 19 runs
Veterans Memorial Park, Virginia
Umpires: Aveek Gangopadhyay and Eshan Mulay
Player of the match: Ariful Haque

- DC Hawks won the toss and elected to bowl

16 July 2022
2:00 PM (EST)
Scorecard

The Philadelphians; 192/4 (20 overs)	v	NJ Somerset Cavaliers; 193/1 (18.2 overs)
Milind Kumar 83* (39); Vanditkumar Prajapati 2/33 (4 overs)		Chandrapaul Hemraj 101* (50); Milind Kumar 1/25 (3.2 overs)

NJ Somerset Cavaliers won by 9 wickets (with 10 balls remaining)
Howe Athletic Complex, New York
Umpires: Ritesh Patel and Bryan Caine
Player of the match: Chandrapaul Hemraj

- The Philadelphians won the toss and elected to bat

17 July 2022
11:00 AM (EST)
Scorecard

NJ Somerset Cavaliers; 128/9 (20 overs)	v	Manhattan Yorkers; 110 (18.4 overs)
Vanditkumar Prajapati 35 (40); Bhaskar Yadram 2/30 (4 overs)		Deveshwari Prashad 21 (22); Waleed Karimullah 4/19 (3.4 overs)

NJ Somerset Cavaliers won by 18 runs
Volunteer Park, Washington
Umpires: Mihir Patel and Ritesh Patel
Player of the match: Waleed Karimullah

- Manhattan Yorkers won the toss and elected to bowl

17 July 2022
11:00 AM (EST)
Scorecard

Empire State Titans; 107 (19.3 overs)	v	DC Hawks; 98/9 (20 overs)
Adil Bhatti 37 (30); Pranto Ahmed 3/19 (4 overs)		Neil Narvekar 24 (29); Adil Bhatti 3/28 (4 overs)

Empire State Titans won by 9 runs
Veterans Memorial Park, Virginia
Umpires: Aveek Gangopadhyay and Eshan Mulay
Player of the match: Adil Bhatti

- Empire State Titans won the toss and elected to bat

23 July 2022
11:00 AM (EST)
Scorecard

Empire State Titans; 122/9 (20 overs)	v	Manhattan Yorkers; 128/3 (12.4 overs)
Savan Patel 48 (40); Deveshwari Prashad 4/15 (4 overs)		John Campbell 58 (24); Ariful Haque 1/11 (2 overs)

Manhattan Yorkers won by 7 wickets (with 46 balls remaining)
Idlewild Park, New York
Umpires: Roan McFarlane and Bryan Caine
Player of the match: John Campbell

- Manhattan Yorkers won the toss and elected to bowl

23 July 2022
2:00 PM (EST)
Scorecard

DC Hawks; 96 (18.2 overs)	v	The Philadelphians; 97/9 (19.2 overs)
Jaskaran Malhotra 36 (37); Juanoy Drysdale 4/31 (4 overs)		Jonathan Foo 31* (29); Sarabjit Ladda 4/17 (4 overs)

The Philadelphians won by 1 wicket (with 4 balls remaining)
Veterans Memorial Park, Virginia
Umpires: Aveek Gangopadhyay and Eshan Mulay
Player of the match: Liam Plunkett

- DC Hawks won the toss and elected to bat

23 July 2022
2:30 PM (EST)
Scorecard

NJ Somerset Cavaliers; 151/9 (20 overs)	v	New England Eagles; 149 (20 overs)
Vanditkumar Prajapati 66 (44); Adil Sardar 4/35 (4 overs)		Apurva Maheshram 52 (39); Najaf Shah 3/19 (4 overs)

NJ Somerset Cavaliers won by 2 runs
Idlewild Park, New York
Umpires: Roan McFarlane and Erfanullah Syed
Player of the match: Vanditkumar Prajapati

- NJ Somerset Cavaliers won the toss and elected to bat

24 July 2022
10:00 AM (EST)
Scorecard

Manhattan Yorkers; 180/5 (20 overs)	v	New England Eagles; 183/5 (18.2 overs)
Danesh Patel 59 (48); Kristopher Ramsaran 2/33 (4 overs)		Azher Ali 60* (41); Bhaskar Yadram 2/35 (3.2 overs)

New England Eagles won by 5 wickets (with 10 balls remaining)
Idlewild Park, New York
Umpires: Roan McFarlane and Bryan Caine
Player of the match: Azher Ali

- Manhattan Yorkers won the toss and elected to bat

24 July 2022
11:00 AM (EST)
Scorecard

DC Hawks; 156/4 (20 overs)	v	The Philadelphians; 96/9 (19.1 overs)
Neil Narvekar 37 (41); Abdul Jabbar 1/18 (2 overs)		Liam Plunkett 37 (39); Pranto Ahmed 3/16 (3 overs)

DC Hawks won by 60 runs
Veterans Memorial Park, Virginia
Umpires: Aveek Gangopadhyay and Eshan Mulay
Player of the match: Junaid Nadir

- DC Hawks won the toss and elected to bat

24 July 2022
2:30 PM (EST)
Scorecard

Empire State Titans; 113 (20 overs)	v	New Jersey Stallions; 119/7 (19.4 overs)
Adil Bhatti 30 (33); Manoj Acharya 4/36 (4 overs)		Raymond Ramrattan 38* (23); Chintan Patel 2/14 (4 overs)

New Jersey Stallions won by 3 wickets (with 2 balls remaining)
Idlewild Park, New York
Umpires: Erfanullah Syed and Bryan Caine
Player of the match: Raymond Ramrattan

- New Jersey Stallions won the toss and elected to bowl

30 July 2022
10:00 AM (EST)
Scorecard

NJ Somerset Cavaliers; 124 (18.5 overs)	v	DC Hawks; 125/2 (17.4 overs)
Navin Stewart 30 (20); Pranto Ahmed 4/24 (3.5 overs)		Ritwik Behera 45 (40); Damion Jacobs 1/23 (4 overs)

DC Hawks won by 8 wickets (with 14 balls remaining)
Exton Park, Philadelphia
Umpires: Rushane Samuels and Mihir Patel
Player of the match: Pranto Ahmed

- NJ Somerset Cavaliers won the toss and elected to bat

30 July 2022
2:00 PM (EST)
Scorecard

Empire State Titans; 164/6 (20 overs)	v	New England Eagles; 116/9 (20 overs)
Savan Patel 48 (45); Devendra Bishoo 3/26 (4 overs)		Saad Awan 33 (25); Adil Bhatti 4/15 (4 overs)

Empire State Titans won by 48 runs
Keney Park, Connecticut
Umpires: Jatin Karvir and Saravanakumar Venkatesan
Player of the match: Adil Bhatti

- New England Eagles won the toss and elected to bowl

30 July 2022
2:30 PM (EST)
Scorecard

The Philadelphians; 140 (18.4 overs)	v	New Jersey Stallions; 144/7 (20 overs)
Liam Plunkett 48 (42); Nino Henry 3/42 (4 overs)		Anthony Bramble 41 (21); Trinson Carmichael 3/31 (3 overs)

New Jersey Stallions won by 3 wickets
Exton Park, Philadelphia
Umpires: Rushane Samuels and Ritesh Patel
Player of the match: Anthony Bramble

- New Jersey Stallions won the toss and elected to bowl

31 July 2022
10:00 AM (EST)
Scorecard

DC Hawks; 125/9 (20 overs)	v	New Jersey Stallions; 126/0 (12.3 overs)
Pranto Ahmed 43 (26); Nino Henry 3/27 (4 overs)		Anthony Bramble 80* (43); Naseer Islam 0/9 (3 overs)

New Jersey Stallions won by 10 wickets (with 45 balls remaining)
Exton Park, Philadelphia
Umpires: Mihir Patel and Bryan Caine
Player of the match: Anthony Bramble

- DC Hawks won the toss and elected to bat

31 July 2022
11:00 AM (EST)
Scorecard

New England Eagles; 104 (17.2 overs)	v	Empire State Titans; 105/6 (16 overs)
Rizwan Mazhar 29 (33); Ariful Haque 3/15 (3.2 overs)		Monank Patel 39 (31); Devendra Bishoo 2/24 (2 overs)

Empire State Titans won by 4 wickets (with 24 balls remaining)
Keney Park, Connecticut
Umpires: Jatin Karvir and Saravanakumar Venkatesan
Player of the match: Monank Patel

- Empire State Titans won the toss and elected to bowl

31 July 2022
2:30 PM (EST)
Scorecard

The Philadelphians; 187/4 (20 overs)	v	Manhattan Yorkers; 193/3 (15.4 overs)
Milind Kumar 104 (62); Bhaskar Yadram 1/31 (4 overs)		Danesh Patel 86* (41); Chiranshu Bhatia 2/21 (3 overs)

Manhattan Yorkers won by 7 wickets (with 26 balls remaining)
Exton Park, Philadelphia
Umpires: Rushane Samuels and Bryan Caine
Player of the match: Danesh Patel

- Manhattan Yorkers won the toss and elected to bowl

6 August 2022
10:00 AM (EST)
Scorecard

New England Eagles; 132/8 (16 overs)	v	Manhattan Yorkers; 135/3 (12.1 overs)
Azher Ali 41 (33); Deveshwari Prashad 2/14 (2 overs)		Shawn Findlay 52* (22); Shrey Parmar 2/40 (3 overs)

Manhattan Yorkers won by 7 wickets (with 23 balls remaining)
Mercer County Park, New Jersey
Umpires: Mihir Patel and Jatin Karvir
Player of the match: Shawn Findlay

- New England Eagles won the toss and elected to bowl

6 August 2022
2:00 PM (EST)
Scorecard

NJ Somerset Cavaliers; 128/7 (20 overs)	v	DC Hawks; 130/2 (14.3 overs)
Richard Allen 59 (32); Sarabjit Ladda 4/5 (4 overs)		Neil Narvekar 100* (48); Vanditkumar Prajapati 1/21 (3 overs)

DC Hawks won by 8 wickets (with 33 balls remaining)
Howe Athletic Complex, New Jersey
Umpires: Ritesh Patel and Deepak Katte
Player of the match: Neil Narvekar

- NJ Somerset Cavaliers won the toss and elected to bat

6 August 2022
2:00 PM (EST)
Scorecard

New Jersey Stallions; 185/4 (20 overs)	v	Empire State Titans; 158/7 (20 overs)
Anthony Bramble 58 (29); Tohidul Islam 2/30 (4 overs)		Christopher van Tull 46 (28); Samarth Tiwari 2/28 (4 overs)

New Jersey Stallions won by 27 runs
Idlewild Park, New York
Umpires: Bryan Caine and Roan McFarlane
Player of the match: Anthony Bramble

- Empire State Titans won the toss and elected to bowl

6 August 2022
2:30 PM (EST)
Scorecard

The Philadelphians; 176/5 (20 overs)	v	New England Eagles; 140 (20 overs)
Derick Narine 64 (38); Hemendra Ramdihal 3/23 (4 overs)		Andre McCarthy 52 (36); Trinson Carmichael 3/29 (4 overs)

The Philadelphians won by 36 runs
Mercer County Park, New Jersey
Umpires: Mihir Patel and Jatin Modi
Player of the match: Derick Narine

- The Philadelphians won the toss and elected to bat

7 August 2022
10:00 AM (EST)
Scorecard

New Jersey Stallions; 161/6 (20 overs)	v	DC Hawks; 146/7 (20 overs)
Dominique Rikhi 47 (37); Ameeq Khan 2/25 (4 overs)		Franklin Clement 52 (32); Stephen Wiig 3/23 (4 overs)

New Jersey Stallions won by 15 runs
Howe Athletic Complex, New Jersey
Umpires: Mihir Patel and Dimpal Patel
Player of the match: Derone Davis

- New Jersey Stallions won the toss and elected to bat

7 August 2022
2:00 PM (EST)
Scorecard

The Philadelphians; 162/5 (20 overs)	v	Manhattan Yorkers; 153/4 (20 overs)
Milind Kumar 71 (64); Raj Patel 2/15 (4 overs)		Christopher Barnwell 53* (40); Trinson Carmichael 1/20 (4 overs)

The Philadelphians won by 9 runs
Mercer County Park, New Jersey
Umpires: Ritesh Patel and Jatin Karvir
Player of the match: Milind Kumar

- Manhattan Yorkers won the toss and elected to bowl

7 August 2022
2:30 PM (EST)
Scorecard

NJ Somerset Cavaliers; 0/0 (0 overs)	v	New England Eagles; 0/0 (0 overs)

Play abandoned
Howe Athletic Complex, New Jersey
Umpires: Mihir Patel and Jatin Modi

13 August 2022
2:00 PM (EST)
Scorecard

DC Hawks; 90 (18.4 overs)	v	Manhattan Yorkers; 96/4 (10.2 overs)
Arsh Arora 23 (26); Surya Thurumella 3/12 (4 overs)		Rajdeep Darbar 40 (25); Sarabjit Ladda 3/14 (2.2 overs)

Manhattan Yorkers won by 6 wickets (with 58 balls remaining)
Hyatsville Cricket Ground, Maryland
Umpires: Anil Pap and Aveek Gangopadhyay
Player of the match: Surya Thurumella

- DC Hawks won the toss and elected to bat

13 August 2022
2:00 PM (EST)
Scorecard

The Philadelphians; 124/7 (20 overs)	v	New Jersey Stallions; 127/2 (18 overs)
Jonathan Foo 57 (47); Nino Henry 2/14 (4 overs)		Dominique Rikhi 62* (53); Trinson Carmichael 1/21 (4 overs)

New Jersey Stallions won by 8 wickets (with 12 balls remaining)
Howe Athletic Complex, New Jersey
Umpires: Mihir Patel and Colin Edwards
Player of the match: Dominique Rikhi

- The Philadelphians won the toss and elected to bat

13 August 2022
2:00 PM (EST)
Scorecard

Manhattan Yorkers; 159/6 (20 overs)	v	DC Hawks; 89/9 (20 overs)
Bhaskar Yadram 38 (22); Pranto Ahmed 3/30 (4 overs)		Aaryan Batra 23* (36); Surya Thurumella 3/4 (4 overs)

Manhattan Yorkers won by 70 runs
Hyatsville Cricket Ground, Maryland
Umpires: Anil Pap and Eshan Mulay
Player of the match: Surya Thurumella

- DC Hawks won the toss and elected to bowl

14 August 2022
2:00 PM (EST)
Scorecard

The Philadelphians; 176/5 (20 overs)	v	Empire State Titans; 150/6 (20 overs)
Milind Kumar 68 (40); Gauranshu Sharma 1/17 (4 overs)		Gauranshu Sharma 50* (26); Soripul Islam 2/19 (3 overs)

The Philadelphians won by 26 runs
Exton Park, Pennsylvania
Umpires: Mihir Patel and Deepak Katte
Player of the match: Milind Kumar

- Empire State Titans won the toss and elected to bowl

14 August 2022
2:00 PM (EST)
Scorecard

New Jersey Stallions; 130 (19.1 overs)	v	NJ Somerset Cavaliers; 63 (17 overs)
Dominique Rikhi 59 (44); Rameez Tirmizi 3/16 (3 overs)		Laxman Nyamagouda 38 (44); Sachin Mylavarapu 3/4 (4 overs)

New Jersey Stallions won by 67 runs
Howe Athletic Complex, New Jersey
Umpires: Colin Edwards and Jatin Modi
Player of the match: Sachin Mylavarapu

- NJ Somerset Cavaliers won the toss and elected to bowl

=== Pacific Conference ===
==== Central Division ====
Pos	Team	Pld	W	L	NR	Pts	NRR
1	Dallas Mustangs	14	12	2	0	24	0.298
2	Chicago Tigers	14	8	5	1	17	0.252
3	Michigan Cricket Stars	14	7	6	1	15	0.390
4	St. Louis Americans	14	7	6	1	15	0.106
5	Houston Hurricanes	14	7	7	0	14	0.076
6	Lone Star Athletics	14	2	10	2	6	−0.232
7	Chicago Blasters	14	0	11	3	3	−0.977

Updated to match(es) played on 8 July 2022. Source: Major League Cricket
- Top two teams advance to the Quarterfinals
- advances to Quarterfinals to play 2nd-place Western Division team
- advances to Quarterfinals to play 1st-place Western Division team
Division matches

25 June 2022
11:30 AM (EST)
Scorecard

Houston Hurricanes; 204/6 (20 overs)	v	Dallas Mustangs; 207/6 (19.1 overs)
Muneeb Riyasat 89* (59); Corey Anderson 2/19 (3 overs)		Sahibzada Farhan 62 (38); Usman Rafiq 3/28 (4 overs)

Dallas Mustangs won by 4 wickets (with 5 balls remaining)
Prairie View Cricket Complex, Houston
Umpires: Sameer Bandekar and Rakesh Jain
Player of the match: Sahib Malhotra

- Houston Hurricanes won the toss and elected to bat

25 June 2022
2:30 PM (EST)
Scorecard

Chicago Tigers; 181/6 (20 overs)	v	St. Louis Americans; 143 (19.4 overs)
Charan Sai Teja 44 (29); Ayaan Khan 5/17 (4 overs)		Justin Dill 66 (40); Ranadeep Aleti 3/30 (4 overs)

Chicago Tigers won by 38 runs
Hanover Park, Illinois
Umpires: Matin Inamdar and Farhan Hashmi
Player of the match: Pruthvish Patel

- St. Louis Americans won the toss and elected to bowl

26 June 2022
7:30 AM (EST)
Scorecard

St. Louis Americans; 151/8 (20 overs)	v	Chicago Blasters; 130/9 (20 overs)
Nikhil Kanchan 37 (22); Mohammad Waqas 3/25 (4 overs)		Fahad Babar 44 (30); Dwayne Smith 3/14 (4 overs)

St. Louis Americans won by 21 runs
Hanover Park, Illinois
Umpires: Mushir Laliwala and Chirag Vaswani
Player of the match: Dwayne Smith

- St. Louis Americans won the toss and elected to bat

26 June 2022
12:00 PM (EST)
Scorecard

Lone Star Athletics; 156/8 (20 overs)	v	Dallas Mustangs; 157/4 (18.2 overs)
Shayan Jahangir 57 (42); Ali Sheikh 3/25 (4 overs)		Sahibzada Farhan 76 (49); Derval Green 2/21 (4 overs)

Dallas Mustangs won by 6 wickets (with 10 balls remaining)
Prairie View Cricket Complex, Houston
Umpires: Sameer Bandekar and Partha Pattanaik
Player of the match: Sahibzada Farhan

- Dallas Mustangs won the toss and elected to bowl

1 July 2022
1:30 PM (EST)
Scorecard

Michigan Cricket Stars; 214/3 (20 overs)	v	Lone Star Athletics; 169/9 (20 overs)
Nauman Anwar 119* (63); Derval Green 2/40 (4 overs)		Shayan Jahangir 46 (38); Mohammad Mohsin 4/21 (4 overs)

Michigan Cricket Stars won by 45 runs
Moosa Stadium, Texas
Umpires: Saravanakmar Venkatesan and Bryan Caine
Player of the match: Nauman Anwar

- Lone Star Athletics won the toss and elected to bowl

1 July 2022
2:00 PM (EST)
Scorecard

Chicago Blasters; 130 (20 overs)	v	Houston Hurricanes; 131/5 (18 overs)
Mohammad Waqas 38 (28); Matthew Tromp 3/23 (4 overs)		Rameez Raja 36 (27); Zia-ul-Haq 1/17 (3 overs)

Houston Hurricanes won by 5 wickets (with 12 balls remaining)
Prairie View Cricket Complex, Houston
Umpires: Anil Pap and Rushane Samuels
Player of the match: Matthew Tromp

- Chicago Blasters won the toss and elected to bat

2 July 2022
10:00 AM (EST)
Scorecard

Dallas Mustangs; 148/5 (20 overs)	v	Bay Blazers; 54/4 (9 overs)
Hussain Talat 43* (27); Mark Deyal 2/23 (4 overs)		Mark Deyal 16 (13); Hussain Talat 2/11 (2 overs)

Dallas Mustangs won by 16 runs (D/L)
Moosa Stadium, Texas
Umpires: Rushane Samuels and Rakesh Jain
Player of the match: Hussain Talat

- Dallas Mustangs won the toss and elected to bat
- Play was reduced to 9 overs for the Bay Blazers, revised target of 71

2 July 2022
10:30 AM (EST)
Scorecard

Golden State Grizzlies; 194/3 (20 overs)	v	Michigan Cricket Stars; 188/8 (20 overs)
Shivam Mishra 83* (46); Nauman Anwar 1/23 (4.0 overs)		Zeeshan Maqsood 50 (30); Zia Shahzad 3/21 (4 overs)

Golden State Grizzlies won by 6 runs
Prairie View Cricket Complex, Houston
Umpires: Sameer Bandekar and Sadiq Khoja
Player of the match: Hammad Azam

- Michigan Cricket Stars won the toss and elected to bowl

2 July 2022
11:00 AM (EST)
Scorecard

Hollywood Master Blasters; 151/6 (20 overs)	v	Chicago Blasters; 146/8 (20 overs)
Ravi Timbawala 55 (50); Pankaj Kampli 3/25 (4 overs)		Awais Zia 49 (29); Hammad Shahid 3/24 (4 overs)

Hollywood Master Blasters won by 5 runs
Prairie View Cricket Complex, Houston
Umpires: Anil Pap and Bryan Caine
Player of the match: Ravi Timbawala

- Hollywood Master Blasters won the toss and elected to bat

2 July 2022
2:30 PM (EST)
Scorecard

Seattle Thunderbolts; 125/1 (15 overs)	v	Lone Star Athletics; 152/6 (15 overs)
Andries Gous 76* (49); Josh Saripella 1/28 (4 overs)		Shayan Jahangir 46 (24); Rahul Singh 2/24 (3 overs)

Seattle Thunderbolts won in the Super Over tiebreaker by 2 wickets (with 3 balls remaining)
Moosa Stadium, Texas
Umpires: Rakesh Jain and Mangesh Rane
Player of the match: Andries Gous

- Lone Star Athletics won the toss and elected to bowl
- Rain was reduced to 15 overs per side, revised target of 153
- Super Over: Lone Star Athletics 7/1 (1.0), Seattle Thunderbolts 11/0 (0.3).

2 July 2022
3:00 PM (EST)
Scorecard

Silicon Valley Strikers; 189/5 (20 overs)	v	Houston Hurricanes; 157/7 (20 overs)
Raymon Reifer 45* (26); Asad Shafiq 2/29 (4 overs)		Matthew Tromp 44* (28); Roshon Primus 2/15 (4 overs)

Silicon Valley Strikers won by 32 runs
Prairie View Cricket Complex, Houston
Umpires: Sameer Bandekar and Owen Brown
Player of the match: Raymon Reifer

- Silicon Valley Strikers won the toss and elected to bat

2 July 2022
3:30 PM (EST)
Scorecard

Chicago Tigers; 165/9 (20 overs)	v	SoCal Lashings; 166/5 (18.5 overs)
Marques Ackerman 73 (47); Sanchit Sandhu 4/24 (4 overs)		Zohaib Ahmed 38 (27); Marques Ackerman 2/20 (3 overs)

SoCal Lashings won by 5 wickets (with 7 balls remaining)
Prairie View Cricket Complex, Houston
Umpires: Bryan Caine and Altaf Mahesania
Player of the match: Sanchit Sandhu

- Chicago Tigers won the toss and elected to bat

2 July 2022
4:00 PM (EST)
Scorecard

St. Louis Americans; 178/4 (20 overs)	v	San Diego Surf Riders; 135/5 (20 overs)
Luke Schofield 75 (50); Kakani Harish 3/29 (4 overs)		Greg Hay 44 (36); Murali Basupalli 4/19 (4 overs)

St. Louis Americans won by 43 runs
Prairie View Cricket Complex, Houston
Umpires: Saravanakumar Venkatesan and Aveek Gangopadhyay
Player of the match: Luke Schofield

- St. Louis Americans won the toss and elected to bat

3 July 2022
10:30 AM (EST)
Scorecard

Lone Star Athletics; 156/6 (20 overs)	v	SoCal Lashings; 86 (17.3 overs)
Shayan Jahangir 77 (54); Akash Singh 3/18 (4 overs)		Dale Phillips 21 (27); Nitish Kumar 3/13 (4 overs)

Lone Star Athletics won by 70 runs
Moosa Stadium, Texas
Umpires: Sameer Bandekar and Colin Edwards
Player of the match: Shayan Jahangir

- Lone Star Athletics won the toss and elected to bat

3 July 2022
11:30 AM (EST)
Scorecard

San Diego Surf Riders; 147/6 (20 overs)	v	Houston Hurricanes; 143/7 (20 overs)
Nikhil Dutta 31 (22); Matthew Tromp 2/21 (4 overs)		Saqlain Haider 56* (38); Adnesh Tondale 3/32 (4 overs)

San Diego Surf Riders won by 4 runs
Prairie View Cricket Complex, Houston
Umpires: Anil Pap and Mangesh Rane
Player of the match: Adnesh Tondale

- Houston Hurricanes won the toss and elected to bowl

3 July 2022
12:30 PM (EST)
Scorecard

Dallas Mustangs; 178/7 (20 overs)	v	Golden State Grizzlies; 146/9 (20 overs)
Sachin Asokan 57 (37); Ehsan Adil 2/26 (4 overs)		Sami Aslam 26 (29); Naseer Jamali 2/23 (4 overs)

Dallas Mustangs won by 32 runs
Moosa Stadium, Texas
Umpires: Sameer Bandekar and Altaf Mahesania
Player of the match: Hussain Talat

- Dallas Mustangs won the toss and elected to bat

3 July 2022
1:00 PM (EST)
Scorecard

St. Louis Americans; 108/8 (20 overs)	v	Seattle Thunderbolts; 112/1 (15.4 overs)
Nikhil Kanchan 30 (35); Phani Simhadri 3/21 (4 overs)		Andries Gous 71* (49); Justin Dill 1/8 (3 overs)

Seattle Thunderbolts won by 9 wickets (with 26 balls remaining)
Prairie View Cricket Complex, Houston
Umpires: Anil Pap and Aveek Gangopadhyay
Player of the match: Andries Gous

- St. Louis Americans won the toss and elected to bat

3 July 2022
1:30 PM (EST)
Scorecard

Silicon Valley Strikers; 215/5 (20 overs)	v	Chicago Tigers; 175 (19.1 overs)
Shehan Jayasuriya 112* (60); Ranadeep Aleti 2/27 (4 overs)		Charan Sai Teja 54 (35); Raymon Reifer 3/37 (4 overs)

Silicon Valley Strikers won by 40 runs
Prairie View Cricket Complex, Houston
Umpires: Owen Brown and Saravanakumar Venkatesan
Player of the match: Shehan Jayasuriya

- Silicon Valley Strikers won the toss and elected to bat

3 July 2022
2:00 PM (EST)
Scorecard

Michigan Cricket Stars; 160/9 (20 overs)	v	Hollywood Master Blasters; 107 (17.3 overs)
Nauman Anwar 48 (43); Venukalyan Madireddy 5/29 (4 overs)		Cody Chetty 30 (28); Andrae Bryce 3/22 (4 overs)

Michigan Cricket Stars won by 53 runs
Prairie View Cricket Complex, Houston
Umpires: Rushane Samuels and Bryan Caine
Player of the match: Mohammad Mohsin

- Hollywood Master Blasters won the toss and elected to bowl

4 July 2022
9:30 AM (EST)
Scorecard

Hollywood Master Blasters; 66 (15.1 overs)	v	Dallas Mustangs; 71/3 (6.5 overs)
Ravi Timbawala 23 (32); Nosthush Kenjige 3/14 (3.3 overs)		Sahibzada Farhan 44* (22); Basanta Regmi 2/24 (2.5 overs)

Dallas Mustangs won by 7 wickets (with 99 balls remaining)
Moosa Stadium, Texas
Umpires: Altaf Mahesania and Bryan Caine
Player of the match: Nosthush Kenjige

- Hollywood Master Blasters won the toss and elected to bowl

4 July 2022
10:00 AM (EST)
Scorecard

Michigan Cricket Stars; 155/6 (20 overs)	v	Silicon Valley Strikers; 158/3 (17.4 overs)
Halhadar Das 37 (37); Srinivas Raghavan 1/17 (4 overs)		Shehan Jayasuriya 115* (65); Andrae Bryce 1/25 (4 overs)

Silicon Valley Strikers won by 3 wickets (with 14 balls remaining)
Prairie View Cricket Complex, Houston
Umpires: Anil Pap and Saravanakumar Venkatesan
Player of the match: Shehan Jayasuriya

- Michigan Cricket Stars won the toss and elected to bat

4 July 2022
11:00 AM (EST)
Scorecard

Chicago Blasters; 171/8 (20 overs)	v	Golden State Grizzlies; 174/4 (19.2 overs)
Fahad Babar 54 (34); Ehsan Adil 3/36 (4 overs)		Sami Aslam 56 (47); Awais Zia 2/30 (3 overs)

Golden State Grizzlies won by 6 wickets (with 4 balls remaining)
Prairie View Cricket Complex, Houston
Umpires: Mangesh Rane and Rakesh Jain
Player of the match: Sami Aslam

- Golden State Grizzlies won the toss and elected to bowl

4 July 2022
2:00 PM (EST)
Scorecard

Bay Blazers; 173/6 (20 overs)	v	Lone Star Athletics; 135 (18.5 overs)
Angelo Perera 58 (36); Majjid Zubair 3/38 (4 overs)		Shayan Jahangir 45 (33); Jahron Alfred 5/32 (4 overs)

Bay Blazers won by 38 runs
Moosa Stadium, Texas
Umpires: Bryan Caine and Owen Brown
Player of the match: Jahron Alfred

- Bay Blazers won the toss and elected to bat

4 July 2022
2:30 PM (EST)
Scorecard

Houston Hurricanes; 144 (19.2 overs)	v	SoCal Lashings; 130/5 (20 overs)
Muneeb Riyasat 46 (47); Elmore Hutchinson 4/42 (4 overs)		Dale Phillips 51* (50); Ashley Nurse 4/23 (4 overs)

Houston Hurricanes won by 14 runs
Prairie View Cricket Complex, Houston
Umpires: Rushane Samuels and Colin Edwards
Player of the match: Dale Phillips

- Houston Hurricanes won the toss and elected to bat

4 July 2022
2:30 PM (EST)
Scorecard

San Diego Surf Riders; 125/8 (20 overs)	v	Chicago Tigers; 126/6 (16.5 overs)
Nikhil Dutta 39 (41); Pruthvish Patel 4/31 (4 overs)		Saad Ali 49* (38); Zubair Murad 2/12 (2 overs)

Chicago Tigers won by 4 wickets (with 19 balls remaining)
Prairie View Cricket Complex, Houston
Umpires: Saravanakumar Venkatesan and Rakesh Jain
Player of the match: Pruthvish Patel

- San Diego Surf Riders won the toss and elected to bat

8 July 2022
7:00 PM (EST)
Scorecard

Chicago Tigers; 192/5 (20 overs)	v	Chicago Blasters; 183/8 (20 overs)
Karan Kumar 53 (56); Zia-ul-Haq 1/21 (4 overs)		Mohammad Waqas 45 (25); Calvin Savage 2/24 (4 overs)

Chicago Tigers won by 9 runs
Hanover Park, Illinois
Umpires: Ameya Redkar and Luckmal Panditharthna
Player of the match: Calvin Savage

- Chicago Tigers won the toss and elected to bat

9 July 2022
10:00 AM (EST)
Scorecard

Chicago Tigers; 181/8 (20 overs)	v	Dallas Mustangs; 158/5 (20 overs)
Charan Sai Teja 46 (33); Hussain Talat 3/37 (4 overs)		Sujith Gowda 51 (25); Sami Sohail 2/31 (4 overs)

Chicago Tigers won by 23 runs
Hanover Park, Illinois
Umpires: Chirag Vaswani and Matin Inamdar
Player of the match: Marques Ackerman

- Chicago Tigers won the toss and elected to bat

9 July 2022
12:30 PM (EST)
Scorecard

St. Louis Americans; 183/5 (20 overs)	v	Houston Hurricanes; 131 (19.1 overs)
Sherfane Rutherford 89 (45); Sohail Tanvir 1/13 (4 overs)		Ashley Nurse 48 (37); Baljinder Singh 3/20 (4 overs)

St. Louis Americans won by 52 runs
Hanover Park, Illinois
Umpires: Farhan Hashmi and Mushir Laliwala
Player of the match: Sherfane Rutherford

- St. Louis Americans won the toss and elected to bat

10 July 2022
10:00 AM (EST)
Scorecard

St. Louis Americans; 86 (18.1 overs)	v	Dallas Mustangs; 89/5 (17.2 overs)
Justin Dill 25 (28); Soorya Selvakumar 4/11 (4 overs)		Sachin Asokan 25 (31); Baljinder Singh 3/17 (4 overs)

Dallas Mustangs won by 5 wickets (with 16 balls remaining)
Hanover Park, Illinois
Umpires: Chirag Vaswani and Mushir Laliwala
Player of the match: Soorya Selvakumar

- St. Louis Americans won the toss and elected to bat

10 July 2022
2:30 PM (EST)
Scorecard

Houston Hurricanes; 101 (20 overs)	v	Chicago Tigers; 104/5 (15.2 overs)
Ashley Nurse 27 (20); Ranadeep Aleti 2/16 (4 overs)		Marques Ackerman 33 (23); Huzefa Ahmed 2/31 (3.2 overs)

Chicago Tigers won by 5 wickets (with 28 balls remaining)
Hanover Park, Illinois
Umpires: Matin Inamdar and Darpan Patel
Player of the match: Marques Ackerman

- Houston Hurricanes won the toss and elected to bat

16 July 2022
10:00 AM (EST)
Scorecard

Chicago Tigers; 153/4 (20 overs)	v	St. Louis Americans; 154/5 (18.2 overs)
Karan Kumar 71 (59); Paras Marwaha 2/18 (4 overs)		Luke Schofield 65 (41); Calvin Savage 4/9 (4 overs)

St. Louis Americans won by 5 wickets (with 10 balls remaining)
ACAC Park, Missouri
Umpires: Matin Inamdar and Srinivas Chirra
Player of the match: Calvin Savage

- St. Louis Americans won the toss and elected to bowl

16 July 2022
2:00 PM (EST)
Scorecard

Dallas Mustangs; 122/8 (20 overs)	v	Houston Hurricanes; 118/5 (20 overs)
Sujith Gowda 31 (28); Usman Rafiq 2/19 (4 overs)		Gaurav Bajaj 46 (42); Adnan Haroon 4/21 (4 overs)

Dallas Mustangs won by 4 runs
Prairie View Cricket Complex, Houston
Umpires: Anil Pap and Mangesh Rane
Player of the match: Nosthush Kenjige

- Dallas Mustangs won the toss and elected to bat

16 July 2022
2:30 PM (EST)
Scorecard

Michigan Cricket Stars; 227/6 (20 overs)	v	Chicago Blasters; 165/7 (20 overs)
Ryan Scott 90 (31); Mohit Patel 1/12 (2 overs)		Mohammad Waqas 63 (37); Mohammad Mohsin 3/24 (4 overs)

Michigan Cricket Stars won by 62 runs
ACAC Park, Missouri
Umpires: Matin Inamdar and Sandeep Pathuri
Player of the match: Ryan Scott

- Michigan Cricket Stars won the toss and elected to bat

17 July 2022
12:00 PM (EST)
Scorecard

Lone Star Athletics; 115/9 (20 overs)	v	Houston Hurricanes; 116/4 (16.3 overs)
Hamza Bangash 36 (39); Usman Rafiq 5/24 (4 overs)		Usman Rafiq 29 (27); Musud Haque 1/14 (3 overs)

Houston Hurricanes won by 6 wickets (with 21 balls remaining)
Prairie View Cricket Complex, Houston
Umpires: Rakesh Jain and Owen Brown
Player of the match: Usman Rafiq

- Houston Hurricanes won the toss and elected to bowl

17 July 2022
12:30 PM (EST)
Scorecard

Michigan Cricket Stars; 0/0 (0 overs)	v	Chicago Tigers; 0/0 (0 overs)

Play abandoned
ACAC Park, Missouri
Umpires: Matin Inamdar and Srinivas Chirra

17 July 2022
3:30 PM (EST)
Scorecard

Chicago Blasters; 0/0 (0 overs)	v	St. Louis Americans; 0/0 (0 overs)

Play abandoned
ACAC Park, Missouri
Umpires: Matin Inamdar and Abhishek Dwarki

23 July 2022
2:00 PM (EST)
Scorecard

Michigan Cricket Stars; 174/7 (20 overs)	v	Chicago Tigers; 175/6 (19 overs)
Nauman Anwar 52 (26); Sami Sohail 4/29 (4 overs)		Saad Ali 69 (46); Zia Khan 2/25 (4 overs)

Chicago Tigers won by 6 wickets (with 6 balls remaining)
Lyon Oaks Cricket Ground, Michigan
Umpires: Karthik Raghupathi and Victor Jebakumar
Player of the match: Saad Ali

- Chicago Tigers won the toss and elected to bowl

23 July 2022
2:00 PM (EST)
Scorecard

Dallas Mustangs; 152/8 (20 overs)	v	Lone Star Athletics; 139/8 (20 overs)
Nosthush Kenjige 40* (23); Majjid Zubair 3/35 (4 overs)		Shayan Jahangir 42 (35); Naseer Jamali 2/19 (4 overs)

Dallas Mustangs won by 13 runs
Moosa Stadium, Texas
Umpires: Cameron Best and Owen Brown
Player of the match: Nosthush Kenjige

- Dallas Mustangs won the toss and elected to bat

23 July 2022
2:30 PM (EST)
Scorecard

St. Louis Americans; 145 (19.5 overs)	v	Houston Hurricanes; 148/5 (18.1 overs)
Nikhil Kanchan 41 (39); Usman Rafiq 6/18 (3.5 overs)		Zeniffe Fowler 42 (27); Ayaan Khan 1/20 (4 overs)

Houston Hurricanes won by 5 wickets (with 11 balls remaining)
Prairie View Cricket Complex, Houston
Umpires: Rakesh Jain and Partha Pattanaik
Player of the match: Usman Rafiq

- Houston Hurricanes won the toss and elected to bowl

24 July 2022
10:30 AM (EST)
Scorecard

St. Louis Americans; 126/7 (20 overs)	v	Dallas Mustangs; 76/3 (9 overs)
Yashodhan Mahajan 39 (41); Hussain Talat 3/16 (4 overs)		Sushant Modani 22* (23); Paras Marwaha 2/31 (2 overs)

Dallas Mustangs won by 7 wickets (D/L)
Moosa Stadium, Texas
Umpires: Sadiq Khoja and Partha Pattanaik
Player of the match: Hussain Talat

- St. Louis Americans won the toss and elected to bat
- Play reduced to 9 overs for the Dallas Mustangs, revised target of 76

24 July 2022
11:00 AM (EST)
Scorecard

Chicago Blasters; 118/7 (15 overs)	v	Michigan Cricket Stars; 119/2 (13.4 overs)
Awais Zia 40 (30); Zeeshan Maqsood 2/22 (3 overs)		Nauman Anwar 77* (52); Awais Zia 1/12 (2 overs)

Michigan Cricket Stars won by 8 wickets (with 8 balls remaining)
Lyon Oaks Cricket Ground, Michigan
Umpires: Karthik Raghupathy and Onkar Akolkar
Player of the match: Nauman Anwar

- Michigan Cricket Stars won the toss and elected to bowl
- Play reduced to 15 overs per side

24 July 2022
2:30 PM (EST)
Scorecard

Lone Star Athletics; 141/3 (16 overs)	v	Houston Hurricanes; 145/7 (15.3 overs)
Kamran Shaikh 43* (23); Karthik Gattepalli 2/19 (3 overs)		Usman Rafiq 48* (17); Jannisar Khan 4/43 (4 overs)

Houston Hurricanes won by 3 wickets (with 3 balls remaining, D/L)
Moosa Stadium, Texas
Umpires: Sadiq Khoja and Owen Brown
Player of the match: Usman Rafiq

- Houston Hurricanes won the toss and elected to bowl
- Play reduced to 16 overs per side, revised target of 143

30 July 2022
2:00 PM (EST)
Scorecard

Michigan Cricket Stars; 175/5 (20 overs)	v	St. Louis Americans; 178/4 (19.2 overs)
Halhadar Das 63* (43); Vraj Patel 2/21 (4 overs)		Ayaan Khan 42 (24); Zeeshan Maqsood 3/36 (4 overs)

St. Louis Americans won by 6 wickets (with 4 balls remaining)
ACAC Park, Missouri
Umpires: Srinivas Chirra and Abhishek Dwarki
Player of the match: Ayaan Khan

- St. Louis Americans won the toss and elected to bowl

30 July 2022
2:30 PM (EST)
Scorecard

Dallas Mustangs; 149/9 (20 overs)	v	Chicago Tigers; 122 (19.1 overs)
Nosthush Kenjige 32 (21); Sami Sohail 6/33 (4 overs)		Saad Ali 30 (21); Nosthush Kenjige 6/10 (4 overs)

Dallas Mustangs won by 27 runs
Moosa Stadium, Texas
Umpires: Owen Brown and Shailendra Raj
Player of the match: Nosthush Kenjige

- Dallas Mustangs won the toss and elected to bat

30 July 2022
3:00 PM (EST)
Scorecard

Chicago Blasters; 113/7 (20 overs)	v	Houston Hurricanes; 114/1 (11.2 overs)
Umair Mir 37 (43); Usman Rafiq 2/21 (4 overs)		Rameez Raja 68* (35); Mohammad Waqas 0/15 (2 overs)

Houston Hurricanes won by 9 wickets (with 52 balls remaining)
Prairie View Cricket Complex, Houston
Umpires: Sameer Bandekar and Altaf Mahesania
Player of the match: Rameez Raja

- Houston Hurricanes won the toss and elected to bowl

31 July 2022
10:00 AM (EST)
Scorecard

Dallas Mustangs; 182/7 (20 overs)	v	Chicago Blasters; 123/6 (20 overs)
Sujith Gowda 83 (55); Chiranjeevi Akunuri 3/18 (4 overs)		Umair Mir 42 (39); Adnan Haroon 2/13 (3 overs)

Dallas Mustangs won by 59 runs
Moosa Stadium, Texas
Umpires: Owen Brown and Sameer Bandekar
Player of the match: Sujith Gowda

- Dallas Mustangs won the toss and elected to bat

31 July 2022
11:00 AM (EST)
Scorecard

Michigan Cricket Stars; 158/8 (20 overs)	v	St. Louis Americans; 120/9 (20 overs)
Halhadar Das 64 (49); Parth Patel 3/15 (3 overs)		Parth Patel 31 (22); Tirth Patel 4/20 (4 overs)

Michigan Cricket Stars won by 38 runs
ACAC Park, Missouri
Umpires: Srinivas Chirra and Sandeep Pathuri
Player of the match: Tirth Patel

- St. Louis Americans won the toss and elected to bowl

31 July 2022
2:30 PM (EST)
Scorecard

Lone Star Athletics; 166/6 (20 overs)	v	Chicago Tigers; 167/7 (20 overs)
Shayan Jahangir 60 (41); Calvin Savage 2/31 (4 overs)		Calvin Savage 45 (21); Khurram Manzoor 1/12 (4 overs)

Chicago Tigers won by 3 wickets
Moosa Stadium, Texas
Umpires: Owen Brown and Sadiq Khoja
Player of the match: Calvin Savage

- Lone Star Athletics won the toss and elected to bat

6 August 2022
11:00 AM (EST)
Scorecard

Lone Star Athletics; 104 (19.4 overs)	v	Chicago Tigers; 92 (17.4 overs)
Sidhesh Pathare 30 (28); Deepchand Pinnaka 3/14 (4 overs)		Sami Sohail 24 (23); Hamza Khalid 4/24 (4 overs)

Lone Star Athletics won by 12 runs
Hanover Park, Illinois
Umpires: Farhan Hashmi and Ameya Redkar
Player of the match: Sidhesh Pathare

- Chicago Tigers won the toss and elected to bowl

6 August 2022
2:00 PM (EST)
Scorecard

Michigan Cricket Stars; 151 (20 overs)	v	Houston Hurricanes; 103 (18 overs)
Nauman Anwar 45 (26); Hassan Rashid 3/55 (4 overs)		Saqlain Haider 26 (23); Tirth Patel 3/23 (3 overs)

Michigan Cricket Stars won by 48 runs
Lyon Oaks Cricket Ground, Michigan
Umpires: Phillip Allen and Onkar Akolkar
Player of the match: Nauman Anwar

- Michigan Cricket Stars won the toss and elected to bat

7 August 2022
10:00 AM (EST)
Scorecard

Chicago Blasters; 0/0 (0 overs)	v	Lone Star Athletics; 0/0 (0 overs)

Play abandoned
Hanover Park, Illinois
Umpires: Ameya Redkar and Darpan Patel

7 August 2022
10:00 AM (EST)
Scorecard

Michigan Cricket Stars; 84 (18.2 overs)	v	Houston Hurricanes; 86/7 (13 overs)
Halhadar Das 34 (35); Hassan Rashid 4/20 (4 overs)		Muneeb Choudhary 45 (33); Mohammad Mohsin 2/17 (4 overs)

Houston Hurricanes won by 3 wickets (with 42 balls remaining)
Lyon Oaks Cricket Ground, Michigan
Umpires: Karthik Raghupathy and Onkar Akolkar
Player of the match: Hassan Rashid

- Michigan Cricket Stars won the toss and elected to bat

7 August 2022
2:30 PM (EST)
Scorecard

Lone Star Athletics; 0/0 (0 overs)	v	Chicago Blasters; 0/0 (0 overs)

Play abandoned
Hanover Park, Illinois
Umpires: Mushir Laliwala and Luckmal Panditharna

12 August 2022
7:00 PM PM (EST)
Scorecard

Chicago Tigers; 149/8 (20 overs)	v	Chicago Blasters; 124/9 (20 overs)
Saad Ali 48 (25); Datta Prakash 4/24 (4 overs)		Abir Chippa 33 (27); Ranadeep Aleti 2/17 (4 overs)

Chicago Tigers won by 25 runs
Hanover Park, Illinois
Umpires: Darpan Patel and Chirag Vaswani
Player of the match: Saad Ali

- Chicago Tigers won the toss and elected to bat

13 August 2022
2:00 PM (EST)
Scorecard

Lone Star Athletics; 141/8 (20 overs)	v	St. Louis Americans; 142/4 (18.1 overs)
Shayan Jahangir 62 (49); Ayaan Khan 2/12 (4 overs)		Nikhil Kanchan 46 (39); Nitish Kumar 2/24 (4 overs)

St. Louis Americans won by 6 wickets (with 11 balls remaining)
ACAC Park, Missouri
Umpires: Srinivas Chirra and Farhan Bobat
Player of the match: Ayaan Khan

- Lone Star Athletics won the toss and elected to bat

13 August 2022
2:00 PM (EST)
Scorecard

Dallas Mustangs; 197/6 (20 overs)	v	Michigan Cricket Stars; 198/7 (19.3 overs)
Corey Anderson 94 (46); Ferhan Ali 1/28 (4 overs)		Ryan Scott 70 (33); Sujith Gowda 2/26 (4 overs)

Michigan Cricket Stars won by 3 wickets (with 3 balls remaining)
McKinney Cricket Ground, Texas
Umpires: Sameer Bandekar and Partha Pattanaik
Player of the match: Ryan Scott

- Michigan Cricket Stars won the toss and elected to bowl

14 August 2022
11:00 AM (EST)
Scorecard

St. Louis Americans; 173/8 (20 overs)	v	Lone Star Athletics; 115 (18.2 overs)
Bhavya Mehta 66 (53); Nitish Kumar 3/27 (4 overs)		Kamran Shaikh 44 (32); Parth Patel 3/2 (1.2 overs)

St. Louis Americans won by 58 runs
ACAC Park, Missouri
Umpires: Srinivas Chirra and Abhishek Dwarki
Player of the match: Bhavya Mehta

- St. Louis Americans won the toss and elected to bat

14 August 2022
11:00 AM (EST)
Scorecard

Michigan Cricket Stars; 119/7 (20 overs)	v	Dallas Mustangs; 121/2 (14.3 overs)
Muhammad Eman 33 (30); Burt Cockley 3/24 (4 overs)		Sujith Gowda 69* (36); Tirth Patel 1/11 (3 overs)

Dallas Mustangs won by 8 wickets (with 33 balls remaining)
McKinney Cricket Ground, Texas
Umpires: Sameer Bandekar and Partha Pattanaik
Player of the match: Sujith Gowda

- Dallas Mustangs won the toss and elected to bowl

==== Western Division ====
Pos	Team	Pld	W	L	NR	Pts	NRR
1	Silicon Valley Strikers	14	13	1	0	26	1.365
2	Seattle Thunderbolts	14	11	3	0	22	1.544
3	Bay Blazers	14	11	3	0	22	0.765
4	Golden State Grizzlies	14	7	7	0	14	−0.474
5	SoCal Lashings	14	4	10	0	8	−0.355
6	San Diego Surf Riders	14	3	11	0	6	−1.573
7	Hollywood Master Blasters	14	2	12	0	4	−1.920

Source: Major League Cricket
- Top two teams advance to the Quarterfinals
- advances to Quarterfinals to play 2nd-place Central Division team
- advances to Quarterfinals to play 1st-place Central Division team
Division matches

25 June 2022
10:00 AM (PST)
Scorecard

Silicon Valley Strikers; 180/4 (20 overs)	v	Hollywood Master Blasters; 117/9 (20 overs)
Unmukt Chand 94* (65); Nisarg Patel 1/23 (4 overs)		Mrunal Patel 34 (29); Saurabh Netravalkar 5/17 (4 overs)

Silicon Valley Strikers won by 63 runs
Leo Magnus Cricket Complex, California
Umpires: Vijaya Mallela and Ashwin Shah
Player of the match: Unmukt Chand

- Hollywood Master Blasters won the toss and elected to bowl

25 June 2022
2:00 PM (PST)
Scorecard

Seattle Thunderbolts; 178/6 (20 overs)	v	Bay Blazers; 184/6 (19 overs)
Harmeet Singh 35 (18); Nawaz Khan 2/41 (4 overs)		Mark Deyal 55 (19); Phani Simhadri 2/31 (4 overs)

Bay Blazers won by 4 wickets (with 6 balls remaining)
Klahanie Park, Washington
Umpires: Kali Vinayag and Raiyo Aspanidar
Player of the match: Mark Deyal

- Bay Blazers won the toss and elected to bowl

25 June 2022
2:00 PM (PST)
Scorecard

Golden State Grizzlies; 182/5 (20 overs)	v	SoCal Lashings; 164/8 (20 overs)
Sami Aslam 79 (55); Abhimanyu Rajp 3/25 (4 overs)		Katene Clarke 99 (70); Vatsal Vaghela 1/12 (4 overs)

Golden State Grizzlies won by 18 runs
Leo Magnus Cricket Complex, California
Umpires: Peshaan Wedanarachchi and Vijaya Mallela
Player of the match: Sami Aslam

- Golden State Grizzlies won the toss and elected to bat

26 June 2022
10:00 AM (PST)
Scorecard

Silicon Valley Strikers; 175/7 (20 overs)	v	SoCal Lashings; 132 (19.4 overs)
Unmukt Chand 53 (34); Muditha Fernando 2/26 (4 overs)		Dale Phillips 45 (33); Muhammad Irfan 3/34 (3.4 overs)

Silicon Valley Strikers won by 43 runs
Leo Magnus Cricket Complex, California
Umpires: Vijaya Mallela and Bandula Hettiarachchi
Player of the match: Unmukt Chand

- Silicon Valley Strikers won the toss and elected to bat

26 June 2022
11:00 AM (PST)
Scorecard

Bay Blazers; 181/6 (20 overs)	v	Seattle Thunderbolts; 182/5 (18.2 overs)
Vikash Mohan 46 (25); Phani Simhadri 2/32 (4 overs)		Rahul Singh 50 (25); Rusty Theron 2/29 (3 overs)

Seattle Thunderbolts won by 5 wickets (with 10 balls remaining)
Klahanie Park, Washington
Umpires: Rameshraju Addepalli and Raiyo Aspanidar
Player of the match: Rahul Singh

- Seattle Thunderbolts won the toss and elected to bowl

26 June 2022
2:30 PM (PST)
Scorecard

Golden State Grizzlies; 179/5 (20 overs)	v	San Diego Surf Riders; 81 (14 overs)
Karan Chandel 71 (47); Devam Shrivastava 2/15 (4 overs)		Nikhil Dutta 49* (32); Ehsan Adil 6/26 (4 overs)

Golden State Grizzlies won by 98 runs
Leo Magnus Cricket Complex, California
Umpires: Pravin David and Vijaya Mallela
Player of the match: Ehsan Adil

- Golden State Grizzlies won the toss and elected to bat

9 July 2022
10:00 AM (PST)
Scorecard

Golden State Grizzlies; 123 (20 overs)	v	Bay Blazers; 127/5 (19.4 overs)
Karan Chandel 40 (27); Sanjay Krishnamurthi 4/17 (4 overs)		David White 37 (28); Sohan Bhat 2/19 (4 overs)

Bay Blazers won by 5 wickets (with 2 balls remaining)
Morgan Hills Sports Complex, California
Umpires: Sameer Bandekar and Ravishankar Byrappagowda
Player of the match: Sanjay Krishnamurthi

- Bay Blazers won the toss and elected to bowl

9 July 2022
2:30 PM (PST)
Scorecard

Silicon Valley Strikers; 218/2 (20 overs)	v	San Diego Surf Riders; 184 (19.1 overs)
Unmukt Chand 104* (67); Zubair Murad 1/26 (3 overs)		Adnesh Tondale 35 (20); Srinivas Raghavan 2/18 (4 overs)

Silicon Valley Strikers won by 34 runs
Morgan Hills Sports Complex, California
Umpires: Sameer Bandekar and Sundaram Subramanian
Player of the match: Unmukt Chand

- Silicon Valley Strikers won the toss and elected to bat

10 July 2022
10:00 AM (PST)
Scorecard

San Diego Surf Riders; 141/9 (20 overs)	v	Golden State Grizzlies; 147/7 (18.2 overs)
Greg Hay 66 (45); Zia Shahzad 3/24 (4 overs)		Shivam Mishra 48 (35); Vedant Jain 2/24 (4 overs)

Golden State Grizzlies won by 3 wickets (with 10 balls remaining)
Morgan Hills Sports Complex, California
Umpires: Sameer Bandekar and Shailendra Raj
Player of the match: Zia Shahzad

- San Diego Surf Riders won the toss and elected to bat

10 July 2022
2:30 PM (PST)
Scorecard

Silicon Valley Strikers; 186/6 (20 overs)	v	Bay Blazers; 184 (20 overs)
Shehan Jayasuriya 86 (52); Mark Deyal 2/19 (4 overs)		Saideep Ganesh 56 (34); Raymon Reifer 3/35 (4 overs)

Silicon Valley Strikers won by 2 runs
Morgan Hills Sports Complex, California
Umpires: Sameer Bandekar and Ravishankar Byrappagowda
Player of the match: Raymon Reifer

- Silicon Valley Strikers won the toss and elected to bat

16 July 2022
10:00 AM (PST)
Scorecard

Hollywood Master Blasters; 161/6 (20 overs)	v	SoCal Lashings; 162/4 (18.5 overs)
Ravi Timbawala 53 (32); Elmore Hutchinson 2/28 (4 overs)		Zohaib Ahmed 70* (55); Basanta Regmi 1/10 (4 overs)

SoCal Lashings won by 6 wickets (with 7 balls remaining)
Leo Magnus Cricket Complex, California
Umpires: Azzam Haider and Madhukar Sood
Player of the match: Zohaib Ahmed

- SoCal Lashings won the toss and elected to bowl

16 July 2022
2:00 PM (PST)
Scorecard

Bay Blazers; 196/4 (20 overs)	v	San Diego Surf Riders; 191/3 (20 overs)
David White 88* (49); Kakani Harish 2/46 (4 overs)		Greg Hay 110* (60); Sanjay Krishnamurthi 1/20 (3 overs)

Bay Blazers won by 5 runs
Canyonside Park, California
Umpires: Daniel Meredith and Pankaj Chaudhari
Player of the match: David White

- Bay Blazers won the toss and elected to bat

16 July 2022
2:30 PM (PST)
Scorecard

Hollywood Master Blasters; 113/9 (20 overs)	v	Seattle Thunderbolts; 114/1 (12.3 overs)
Cody Chetty 38 (35); Harmeet Singh 3/20 (4 overs)		Rishi Bhardwaj 56* (40); Venukalyan Madireddy 1/24 (3 overs)

Seattle Thunderbolts won by 9 wickets (with 45 balls remaining)
Leo Magnus Cricket Complex, California
Umpires: Azzam Haider and Pravin David
Player of the match: Rishi Bhardwaj

- Hollywood Master Blasters won the toss and elected to bat

17 July 2022
10:00 AM (PST)
Scorecard

Seattle Thunderbolts; 182/5 (20 overs)	v	SoCal Lashings; 87 (16.4 overs)
Rishi Bhardwaj 61 (32); Sanchit Sandhu 3/24 (3 overs)		Elmore Hutchinson 24 (13); Akhilesh Bodugum 3/16 (4 overs)

Seattle Thunderbolts won by 95 runs
Leo Magnus Cricket Complex, California
Umpires: Ashwin Shah and Madhukar Sood
Player of the match: Rishi Bhardwaj

- SoCal Lashings won the toss and elected to bowl

17 July 2022
11:00 AM (PST)
Scorecard

San Diego Surf Riders; 88/8 (20 overs)	v	Bay Blazers; 89/1 (8.5 overs)
Greg Hay 45* (57); Sanjay Krishnamurthi 3/17 (4 overs)		Mark Deyal 52* (24); Ajay Sharma 1/22 (2 overs)

Bay Blazers won by 9 wickets (with 67 balls remaining)
Canyonside Park, California
Umpires: Pankaj Chaudhari and Daniel Meredith
Player of the match: Mark Deyal

- San Diego Surf Riders won the toss and elected to bat

17 July 2022
2:00 PM (PST)
Scorecard

Silicon Valley Strikers; 205/6 (20 overs)	v	Golden State Grizzlies; 165/9 (20 overs)
Zahid Zakhail 72 (41); Zia Shahzad 2/44 (4 overs)		Sami Aslam 67 (40); Pranay Suri 6/24 (4 overs)

Silicon Valley Strikers won by 40 runs
Morgan Hills Outdoor Complex, California
Umpires: Ravishankar Byrappagowda and Suyog Patil
Player of the match: Pranay Suri

- Golden State Grizzlies won the toss and elected to bowl

17 July 2022
2:00 PM (PST)
Scorecard

Seattle Thunderbolts; 148/7 (20 overs)	v	Hollywood Master Blasters; 111/9 (20 overs)
Andries Gous 48 (49); Kiran Viradiya 2/19 (3 overs)		Ravi Timbawala 30 (31); Akhilesh Bodugum 3/18 (4 overs)

Seattle Thunderbolts won by 37 runs
Leo Magnus Cricket Complex, California
Umpires: Ashwin Shah and Pravin David
Player of the match: Phani Simhadri

- Hollywood Master Blasters won the toss and elected to bowl

23 July 2022
2:00 PM (PST)
Scorecard

Silicon Valley Strikers; 130/8 (20 overs)	v	Seattle Thunderbolts; 105 (17.3 overs)
Pranay Suri 34 (28); Akhilesh Bodugum 2/22 (4 overs)		Andries Gous 36 (30); Pranay Suri 5/10 (4 overs)

Silicon Valley Strikers won by 25 runs
Tollgate Farm Park, Washington
Umpires: Kali Vinayag and Rameshraju Addepalli
Player of the match: Pranay Suri

- Seattle Thunderbolts won the toss and elected to bowl

23 July 2022
2:00 PM (PST)
Scorecard

Hollywood Master Blasters; 134/5 (20 overs)	v	San Diego Surf Riders; 130/7 (20 overs)
Karan Viradiya 41 (25); Kakani Harish 3/27 (4 overs)		Nikhil Dutta 37 (44); Timil Patel 2/21 (3 overs)

Hollywood Master Blasters won by 4 runs
Canyonside Park, California
Umpires: Pankaj Chaudhari and Bandula Hettiarachchi
Player of the match: Karan Viradiya

- San Diego Surf Riders won the toss and elected to bowl

24 July 2022
11:00 AM (PST)
Scorecard

Silicon Valley Strikers; 94 (19.5 overs)	v	Seattle Thunderbolts; 65/8 (20 overs)
Shehan Jayasuriya 46 (36); Phani Simhadri 4/14 (4 overs)		Adam Crosthwaite 21 (34); Raymon Reifer 3/7 (3 overs)

Silicon Valley Strikers won by 29 runs
Tollgate Farm Park, Washington
Umpires: Kali Vinayag and Raiyo Aspanidar
Player of the match: Shehan Jayasuriya

- Seattle Thunderbolts won the toss and elected to bowl

24 July 2022
1:00 PM (PST)
Scorecard

Golden State Grizzlies; 169/6 (20 overs)	v	Bay Blazers; 172/9 (19.5 overs)
Shivam Mishra 77 (53); Mark Deyal 2/8 (4 overs)		David White 66 (39); Vatsal Vaghela 3/43 (4 overs)

Bay Blazers won by 1 wicket (with 1 ball remaining)
Arroyo Park, California
Umpires: Ravishankar Byrappagowda and Sundaram Subramanian
Player of the match: David White

- Bay Blazers won the toss and elected to bowl

24 July 2022
2:00 PM (PST)
Scorecard

SoCal Lashings; 160/9 (20 overs)	v	San Diego Surf Riders; 163/5 (20 overs)
Dale Phillips 40 (18); Vedant Jain 3/18 (4 overs)		Marty Kain 53 (41); Elmore Hutchinson 1/23 (4 overs)

San Diego Surf Riders won by 5 wickets
Canyonside Park, California
Umpires: Bandula Hettiarachchi and Pankaj Chaudhari
Player of the match: Marty Kain

- SoCal Lashings won the toss and elected to bat

30 July 2022
10:00 AM (PST)
Scorecard

Hollywood Master Blasters; 138 (20 overs)	v	SoCal Lashings; 143/2 (15.5 overs)
Rohith Ramkumar 56 (47); Harpreet Singh 3/17 (4 overs)		Dale Phillips 84* (49); Basanta Regmi 1/13 (4 overs)

SoCal Lashings won by 8 wickets (with 25 balls remaining)
Leo Magnus Cricket Complex, California
Umpires: Madhukar Sood and Peshaan Wedanarachchi
Player of the match: Dale Phillips

- Hollywood Master Blasters won the toss and elected to bat

30 July 2022
2:00 PM (PST)
Scorecard

Golden State Grizzlies; 100 (17.1 overs)	v	Silicon Valley Strikers; 101/0 (10.3 overs)
Shivam Mishra 33 (29); Saurabh Netravalkar 4/13 (3.1 overs)		Unmukt Chand 64* (35); Vatsal Vaghela 0/11 (2 overs)

Silicon Valley Strikers won by 10 wickets (with 57 balls remaining)
Morgan Hills Outdoor Complex, California
Umpires: Sundaram Subramanian and Ravishankar Byrappagowda
Player of the match: Saurabh Netravalkar

- Golden State Grizzlies won the toss and elected to bat

30 July 2022
2:30 PM (PST)
Scorecard

Hollywood Master Blasters; 110 (18.5 overs)	v	San Diego Surf Riders; 114/7 (19.3 overs)
Abdulahad Malik 36 (21); Marty Kain 4/18 (3.5 overs)		Nikhil Dutta 36 (36); Karan Viradiya 3/16 (4 overs)

San Diego Surf Riders won by 3 wickets (with 3 balls remaining)
Leo Magnus Cricket Complex, California
Umpires: Madhukar Sood and Peshaan Wedanarachchi
Player of the match: Dale Phillips

- Hollywood Master Blasters won the toss and elected to bat

31 July 2022
2:00 PM (PST)
Scorecard

Silicon Valley Strikers; 166/8 (20 overs)	v	Bay Blazers; 167/6 (18.2 overs)
Shehan Jayasuriya 69 (46); Carmi le Roux 4/26 (4 overs)		Angelo Perera 53* (35); Saurabh Netravalkar 2/21 (4 overs)

Bay Blazers won by 4 wickets (with 10 balls remaining)
Morgan Hills Outdoor Complex, California
Umpires: Sundaram Subramanian and Suyog Patil
Player of the match: Angelo Perera

- Bay Blazers won the toss and elected to bowl

6 August 2022
10:00 AM (PST)
Scorecard

SoCal Lashings; 159/4 (20 overs)	v	Silicon Valley Strikers; 161/4 (18.5 overs)
Katene Clarke 60 (46); Srinivas Raghavan 1/29 (4 overs)		Unmukt Chand 73* (55); Abhimanyu Rajp 1/19 (4 overs)

Silicon Valley Strikers won by 6 wickets (with 7 balls remaining)
Morgan Hills Outdoor Complex, California
Umpires: Bandula Hettiarachchi and Suyog Patil
Player of the match: Unmukt Chand

- Silicon Valley Strikers won the toss and elected to bowl

6 August 2022
10:00 AM (PST)
Scorecard

San Diego Surf Riders; 97 (18.2 overs)	v	Seattle Thunderbolts; 102/4 (12.2 overs)
Greg Hay 34 (29); Shadley van Schalkwyk 2/9 (3 overs)		Shubham Ranjane 33 (21); Zubair Murad 3/22 (3 overs)

Seattle Thunderbolts won by 6 wickets (with 46 balls remaining)
Morgan Hills Outdoor Complex, California
Umpires: Sunil Singh and Ravishankar Byrappagowda
Player of the match: Shubham Ranjane

- Seattle Thunderbolts won the toss and elected to bowl

6 August 2022
2:30 PM (PST)
Scorecard

SoCal Lashings; 140 (19.5 overs)	v	Golden State Grizzlies; 143/3 (17.5 overs)
Rajveer Khosa 38 (42); Zia Shahzad 3/27 (3.5 overs)		Sami Aslam 72 (54); Elmore Hutchinson 2/15 (4 overs)

Golden State Grizzlies won by 7 wickets (with 13 balls remaining)
Morgan Hills Outdoor Complex, California
Umpires: Bandula Hettiarachchi and Sundaram Subramanian
Player of the match: Sami Aslam

- SoCal Lashings won the toss and elected to bat

6 August 2022
2:30 PM (PST)
Scorecard

Bay Blazers; 215/5 (20 overs)	v	Hollywood Master Blasters; 100/9 (20 overs)
Sanjay Krishnamurthi 75 (25); Basanta Regmi 1/34 (4 overs)		Ajay Immadi 20* (19); Carmi le Roux 4/14 (4 overs)

Bay Blazers won by 115 runs
Morgan Hills Outdoor Complex, California
Umpires: Madhukar Sood and Sunil Singh
Player of the match: Sanjay Krishnamurthi

- Bay Blazers won the toss and elected to bat

7 August 2022
10:00 AM (PST)
Scorecard

Golden State Grizzlies; 180/2 (20 overs)	v	Hollywood Master Blasters; 118/5 (20 overs)
Sami Aslam 104* (70); Ajay Immadi 1/22 (3 overs)		Karan Viradiya 34 (25); Zia Shahzad 1/12 (4 overs)

Golden State Grizzlies won by 62 runs
Morgan Hills Outdoor Complex, California
Umpires: Madhukar Sood and Ravishankar Byrappagowda
Player of the match: Sami Aslam

- Golden State Grizzlies won the toss and elected to bat

7 August 2022
10:00 AM (PST)
Scorecard

San Diego Surf Riders; 183/5 (20 overs)	v	Seattle Thunderbolts; 184/7 (20 overs)
Sri Krishna 71* (39); Phani Simhadri 1/31 (4 overs)		Andries Gous 83 (52); Adnesh Tondale 4/46 (4 overs)

Seattle Thunderbolts won by 3 wickets
Morgan Hills Outdoor Complex, California
Umpires: Sundaram Subramanian and Suyog Patil
Player of the match: Andries Gous

- Seattle Thunderbolts won the toss and elected to bowl

7 August 2022
2:30 PM (PST)
Scorecard

SoCal Lashings; 191/3 (20 overs)	v	Bay Blazers; 192/3 (17.5 overs)
Katene Clarke 117* (70); Angelo Perera 1/21 (4 overs)		David White 73 (54); Dale Phillips 2/20 (1.5 overs)

Bay Blazers won by 7 wickets (with 13 balls remaining)
Morgan Hills Outdoor Complex, California
Umpires: Madhukar Sood and Shailendra Raj
Player of the match: Katene Clarke

- SoCal Lashings won the toss and elected to bat

13 August 2022
2:00 PM (PST)
Scorecard

Hollywood Master Blasters; 108/8 (20 overs)	v	Bay Blazers; 109/1 (11.2 overs)
Cody Chetty 27 (26); Angelo Perera 4/12 (4 overs)		Saideep Ganesh 53 (30); Mrunal Patel 1/12 (2 overs)

Bay Blazers won by 9 wickets (with 52 balls remaining)
Santa Clara Cricket Field, California
Umpires: Sundaram Subramanian and Sunil Singh
Player of the match: Saideep Ganesh

- Hollywood Master Blasters won the toss and elected to bat

13 August 2022
2:00 PM (PST)
Scorecard

Golden State Grizzlies; 122 (17.3 overs)	v	Seattle Thunderbolts; 125/6 (11.3 overs)
Mohit Nataraj 39 (32); Phani Simhadri 3/8 (3 overs)		Rayyan Pathan 61 (32); Zia Shahzad 4/16 (3 overs)

Seattle Thunderbolts won by 4 wickets (with 51 balls remaining)
Klahanie Park, Washington
Umpires: Nitesh Deo and Rameshraju Addepalli
Player of the match: Rayyan Pathan

- Golden State Grizzlies won the toss and elected to bat

14 August 2022
11:00 AM (PST)
Scorecard

Golden State Grizzlies; 110/8 (20 overs)	v	Seattle Thunderbolts; 111/3 (7.1 overs)
Shivam Mishra 28 (29); Shubham Ranjane 3/12 (4 overs)		Harmeet Singh 45* (13); Zia Shahzad 1/26 (2.1 overs)

Seattle Thunderbolts won by 7 wickets (with 51 balls remaining)
Klahanie Park, Washington
Umpires: Kali Vinayag and Rameshraju Addepalli
Player of the match: Harmeet Singh

- Seattle Thunderbolts won the toss and elected to bowl

14 August 2022
2:00 PM (PST)
Scorecard

SoCal Lashings; 204/5 (20 overs)	v	San Diego Surf Riders; 107 (18.3 overs)
Katene Clarke 65 (42); Kakani Harish 2/36 (4 overs)		Greg Hay 23 (24); Chamkaur Khosa 3/17 (4 overs)

SoCal Lashings won by 97 runs
Leo Magnus Cricket Complex, California
Umpires: Azzam Haider and Bandula Hettiarachchi
Player of the match: Harpreet Singh

- SoCal Lashings won the toss and elected to bat

14 August 2022
2:00 PM (PST)
Scorecard

Hollywood Master Blasters; 132/9 (20 overs)	v	Silicon Valley Strikers; 136/3 (16.5 overs)
Cody Chetty 45 (36); Kulvinder Singh 4/24 (4 overs)		Unmukt Chand 63 (48); Ajay Immadi 2/21 (2.5 overs)

Silicon Valley Strikers won by 7 wickets
Santa Clara Cricket Field, California
Umpires: Shailendra Raj and Sunil Singh
Player of the match: Kulvinder Singh

- Silicon Valley Strikers won the toss and elected to bat

== Playoffs ==
Quarter-finals
20-21 August 2022 – Georgia
Atlanta Fire	1
Manhattan Yorkers	0
20-21 August 2022 – North Carolina
New Jersey Stallions	2
Morrisville Raptors	0
20-21 August 2022 – Texas
Dallas Mustangs	0
Seattle Thunderbolts	2
20-21 August 2022 – California
Silicon Valley Strikers	2
Chicago Tigers	1

Semi-finals
27 August 2022 – North Carolina
Atlanta Fire	210/6
New Jersey Stallions	114
27 August 2022 – North Carolina
Seattle Thunderbolts	155/7
Silicon Valley Strikers	149/8

Final
28 August 2022 – North Carolina
Seattle Thunderbolts	157/5
Atlanta Fire	147/9

=== Quarter-finals ===
20 August 2022
10:00 AM (EST)
Scorecard

Atlanta Fire; 198/7 (20 overs)	v	Manhattan Yorkers; 136/7 (15.2 overs)
Zain Sayed 75 (46); Christopher Barnwell 4/31 (4 overs)		Rajdeep Darbar 39 (22); Nasir Hossain 2/6 (2 overs)

Atlanta Fire won by 19 runs (D/L)
Atlanta Cricket Fields, Georgia
Umpires: Rushane Samuels and Colin Edwards
Player of the match: Zain Sayed

- Manhattan Yorkers won the toss and elected to bowl
- Rain stopped play

20 August 2022
10:00 AM (EST)
Scorecard

Chicago Tigers; 95 (19.1 overs)	v	Silicon Valley Strikers; 97/1 (9.3 overs)
Saad Ali 26 (19); Pranay Suri 3/23 (4 overs)		Lendl Simmons 52* (25); Sami Sohail 1/19 (2 overs)

Silicon Valley Strikers won by 9 wickets (with 63 balls remaining)
Morgan Hills Outdoor Complex, California
Umpires: Sameer Bandekar and Sundaram Subramanian
Player of the match: Pranay Suri

- Silicon Valley Strikers won the toss and elected to bowl

20 August 2022
10:00 AM (EST)
Scorecard

Dallas Mustangs; 0/0 (0 overs)	v	Seattle Thunderbolts; 0/0 (0 overs)

Play abandoned
Moosa Stadium, Texas
Umpires: Bryan Caine and Mihir Patel

20 August 2022
12:00 PM (EST)
Scorecard

New Jersey Stallions; 152/5 (20 overs)	v	Morrisville Raptors; 136/9 (20 overs)
Saiteja Mukkamalla 53* (41); Obus Pienaar 3/27 (4 overs)		Dane Piedt 53* (30); Derone Davis 2/13 (3 overs)

New Jersey Stallions won by 16 runs
Church Street Park, North Carolina
Umpires: Vijaya Mallela and Matin Inamdar
Player of the match: Derone Davis

- Morrisville Raptors won the toss and elected to bowl

20 August 2022
2:30 PM (EST)
Scorecard

Atlanta Fire; 0/0 (0 overs)	v	Manhattan Yorkers; 0/0 (0 overs)

Play abandoned
Atlanta Cricket Fields, Georgia
Umpires: Rushane Samuels and Colin Edwards

20 August 2022
2:30 PM (EST)
Scorecard

Chicago Tigers; 136/5 (20 overs)	v	Silicon Valley Strikers; 136/4 (20 overs)
Saad Ali 43 (37); Pranay Suri 3/12 (4 overs)		Unmukt Chand 45 (46); Deepchand Pinnaka 2/31 (4 overs)

Chicago Tigers won in the Super Over tiebreaker by 2 wickets
Morgan Hills Outdoor Complex, California
Umpires: Sameer Bandekar and Sundaram Subramanian
Player of the match: Calvin Savage

- Silicon Valley Strikers won the toss and elected to bowl
- Super Over: Silicon Valley Strikers 4/1 (1.0), Chicago Tigers 5/0 (0.2).

20 August 2022
12:00 PM (EST)
Scorecard

New Jersey Stallions; 167/6 (20 overs)	v	Morrisville Raptors; 166/8 (20 overs)
Anthony Bramble 75 (53); Aditya Padala 2/22 (3 overs)		Vinothkumar Kandaswamy 51 (36); Sachin Mylavarapu 2/20 (4 overs)

New Jersey Stallions won by 1 run
Church Street Park, North Carolina
Umpires: Vijaya Mallela and Matin Inamdar
Player of the match: Anthony Bramble

- Morrisville Raptors won the toss and elected to bowl

21 August 2022
11:00 AM (EST)
Scorecard

Chicago Tigers; 147/8 (20 overs)	v	Silicon Valley Strikers; 151/2 (16.3 overs)
Saad Ali 46 (43); Shehan Jayasuriya 3/21 (4 overs)		Unmukt Chand 71* (54); Marques Ackerman 1/26 (3 overs)

Silicon Valley Strikers won by 8 wickets (with 21 balls remaining)
Morgan Hills Outdoor Complex, California
Umpires: Sameer Bandekar and Sundaram Subramanian
Player of the match: Unmukt Chand

- Silicon Valley Strikers won the toss and elected to bowl

21 August 2022
12:45 PM (EST)
Scorecard

Dallas Mustangs; 205/5 (20 overs)	v	Seattle Thunderbolts; 97 (18.1 overs)
Andries Gous 79 (50); Ali Sheikh 2/42 (4 overs)		Sujith Gowda 19 (11); Phani Simhadri 5/9 (3.1 overs)

Seattle Thunderbolts won by 108 runs
Prairie View Cricket Complex, Houston
Umpires: Bryan Caine and Mihir Patel
Player of the match: Phani Simhadri

- Dallas Mustangs won the toss and elected to bowl

21 August 2022
4:00 PM (EST)
Scorecard

Dallas Mustangs; 182/5 (14 overs)	v	Seattle Thunderbolts; 149/4 (14 overs)
Rayyan Pathan 48 (21); Nosthush Kenjige 2/17 (3 overs)		Willem Ludick 52 (28); Phani Simhadri 3/29 (3 overs)

Seattle Thunderbolts won by 33 runs
Prairie View Cricket Complex, Houston
Umpires: Bryan Caine and Mihir Patel
Player of the match: Phani Simhadri

- Dallas Mustangs won the toss and elected to bowl
- Play reduced to 14 overs per side

=== Semi-finals ===
27 August 2022
1:00 PM (EST)
Scorecard

Seattle Thunderbolts; 155/7 (20 overs)	v	Silicon Valley Strikers; 149/8 (20 overs)
Rishi Bhardwaj 66* (47); Fidel Edwards 3/52 (4 overs)		Lendl Simmons 39 (32); Phani Simhadri 2/17 (4 overs)

Seattle Thunderbolts won by 6 runs
Church Street Park, North Carolina
Umpires: Sameer Bandekar and Rushane Samuels
Player of the match: Rishi Bhardwaj

- Seattle Thunderbolts won the toss and elected to bat

27 August 2022
5:30 PM (EST)
Scorecard

Atlanta Fire; 210/6 (20 overs)	v	New Jersey Stallions; 114 (17.1 overs)
Aaron Jones 76* (46); Manoj Acharya 2/32 (4 overs)		Saiteja Mukkamalla 34 (24); Evroy Dyer 4/13 (3.1 overs)

Atlanta Fire won by 96 runs
Church Street Park, North Carolina
Umpires: Sameer Bandekar and Rushane Samuels
Player of the match: Aaron Jones

- New Jersey Stallions won the toss and elected to bowl

=== Final ===
28 August 2022
5:00 PM (EST)
Scorecard

Seattle Thunderbolts; 157/5 (20 overs)	v	Atlanta Fire; 147/9 (20 overs)
Shubham Ranjane 51 (45); Steven Taylor 3/36 (4 overs)		Aaron Jones 64 (51); Shubham Ranjane 4/21 (4 overs)

Seattle Thunderbolts won by 10 runs
Church Street Park, North Carolina
Umpires: Jermaine Lindo and Rushane Samuels
Player of the match: Shubham Ranjane

- Seattle Thunderbolts won the toss and elected to bat
- The Seattle Thunderbolts (ST) won the 2022 Minor League Cricket championship as of this match.

== Statistics ==
=== Most runs ===
Player	Team	Mat	Inns	Runs	Ave	SR	HS	100	50	4s	6s
Unmukt Chand	Silicon Valley Strikers	18	18	693	53.31	130.26	104	1	6	67	28
Shehan Jayasuriya	Silicon Valley Strikers	18	17	692	49.43	137.23	115	2	3	70	26
Andries Gous	Seattle Thunderbolts	17	17	616	44.00	140.32	83	0	5	65	25
David White	Bay Blazers	14	14	607	55.18	145.91	88	0	5	51	37
Lahiru Milantha	Morrisville Raptors	14	14	534	38.14	148.33	91	0	5	57	19
Source: Minor League Cricket

=== Most wickets ===
Player	Team	Mat	Inns	Wkts	BBI	Avg	Econ	SR	4w	5w
Phani Simhadri	Seattle Thunderbolts	17	17	43	5/9	8.74	5.92	8.8	1	1
Sarabjit Ladda	DC Hawks	14	14	27	4/5	11.81	6.10	11.6	3	0
Nosthush Kenjige	Dallas Mustangs	14	13	26	6/10	8.65	4.95	10.5	0	1
Pranay Suri	Silicon Valley Strikers	18	17	26	6/24	13.23	6.37	12.5	0	2
Zia Shahzad	Golden State Grizzlies	14	14	25	4/16	14.00	6.73	12.5	1	0
Source: Minor League Cricket
