= Yasir Mohammad =

American cricketer (born 2002)

Personal information
- Full name: Yasir Saeed Mohammad
- Born: October 10, 2002 (age 24); Edison, New Jersey, United States
- Batting: Left-handed
- Bowling: Right-arm leg-break googly
- Role: Bowler

International information
- National side: United States
- ODI debut (cap 40): June 8, 2022 v Oman
- Last ODI: February 18, 2025 v Oman
- T20I debut (cap 22): December 22, 2021 v Ireland
- Last T20I: April 27, 2025 v Canada

Domestic team information
- Years: Team
- 2020–2022: New Jersey Somerset Cavaliers
- 2022: Manhattan Yorkers
- 2023-present: Washington Freedom

Career statistics
Competition	ODI	T20I	LA	T20
Matches	7	13	7	14
Runs scored	5	24	5	24
Batting average	2.50	6.00	2.50	6.00
100s/50s	0/0	0/0	0/0	0/0
Top score	3	16	3	16
Balls bowled	252	255	252	261
Wickets	7	20	7	20
Bowling average	34.57	15.30	34.57	16.30
5 wickets in innings	0	0	0	0
10 wickets in match	0	0	0	0
Best bowling	2/10	4/11	2/10	4/11
Catches/stumpings	1/–	5/–	1/–	7/–
- Source: Cricinfo, February 15, 2026

Yasir Saeed Mohammad (born October 10, 2002) is an American cricketer, who plays as a bowler for the United States national cricket team. He also plays for Washington Freedom in the MLC and for the Manhattan Yorkers in Minor League Cricket.

== Career ==
Mohammad was born in Edison, New Jersey to a Pakistani immigrant family on October 10, 2002. He lives in New Jersey.

Mohammad started playing cricket at the age of 12 in New Jersey. A right-arm leg-break and googly bowler, he made his Twenty20 International (T20I) debut against Ireland on December 22, 2021. He was selected to play for the New Jersey Somerset Cavaliers for the inaugural season of Minor League Cricket before transferring over to the Manhattan Yorkers for the 2022 season.

In May 2022, he was named in the USA's One Day International (ODI) squads for round 12 and round 13 of the 2019–2023 ICC Cricket World Cup League 2 tournament. He made his ODI debut on June 8, 2022, for the United States against Oman.

In May 2024, he was named a reserve player of the American squad for the 2024 ICC Men's T20 World Cup tournament.
