= Sagar Patel =

American cricketer (born 1997)

Personal information
- Born: April 28, 1997 (age 29); Memphis, Tennessee, United States

International information
- National side: United States
- Source: Cricinfo, September 9, 2019

Sagar Patel (born April 28, 1997) is an American cricketer. He played for the United States in the 2017 ICC World Cricket League Division Three tournament in May 2017.

In June 2019, he was named in a 30-man training squad for the United States cricket team, ahead of the Regional Finals of the 2018–19 ICC T20 World Cup Americas Qualifier tournament in Bermuda. The following month, he was one of twelve players to sign a three-month central contract with USA Cricket. In September 2019, he was named in United States's One Day International (ODI) squad for the 2019 United States Tri-Nation Series.

In November 2019, he was named in the United States' squad for the 2019–20 Regional Super50 tournament. He made his List A debut on November 11, 2019, for the United States in the 2019–20 Regional Super50 tournament. In June 2021, he was selected to take part in the Minor League Cricket tournament in the United States following the players' draft.
