= Dominique Rikhi =

American cricketer

Personal information
- Full name: Dominique Omelio Darren Rikhi
- Born: 20 March 1993 (age 33); Berbice, Guyana
- Batting: Right-handed
- Bowling: Right-arm medium
- Role: All-rounder

International information
- National side: United States (2021)
- ODI debut (cap 36): 20 September 2021 v Oman

Domestic team information
- Years: Team
- 2020: Nepali Rhinos
- 2021-: New Jersey Stallions

Career statistics
Competition	ODI	LA
Matches	2	2
Runs scored	3	3
Batting average	1.50	1.50
100s/50s	0/0	0/0
Top score	3	3
Balls bowled	–	–
Wickets	–	–
Bowling average	–	–
5 wickets in innings	–	–
10 wickets in match	–	–
Best bowling	–/–	–/–
Catches/stumpings	1/-	1/–
- Source: Cricinfo, 20 September 2021

Dominique Omelio Darren Rikhi (born 20 March 1993) is a Guyanese-born American cricketer. He made his debut for the American national side on 16 September 2021.

== Biography ==
Born in Berbice, Guyana, Rikhi immigrated to Richmond Hill, NY, and started playing club cricket in mid-2017 for the Richmond Hill Liberty Cricket Club. He continued playing T20 and List A cricket for the club until early 2020 when he got selected for a United States National Training Camp. After the training camp, in September 2020, Rikhi was selected to take part in the Minor League Cricket Exhibition series, in which he received a "Best Batter" award for his contributions.

Later, in January 2021, he was selected again to be part of another USA National Training Camp, set to take place in Houston, Texas, but the camp was cancelled due to the COVID-19 pandemic. Rikhi was then selected to play for the Nepali Rhinos in the LA Open 2021 Championship, in which they were the runner-up.

He was also selected to play for the New Jersey Stallions for the 2021 season of Minor League Cricket in June 2021. On his debut weekend, he scored 46 and 41, being top-scorer for the team. He and his team won both matches which were played by the New Jersey Stallions. He continued to play well throughout the series, managing to score 150 more runs and taking 6 wickets.

In August 2021, he was selected as part of the squad to play Papua New Guinea in a two-match ODI series. He was also selected as part of the squad for the 2021 Tri-Series in Oman taking placing from 13 to 20 September. He made his One Day International (ODI) debut for the United States on 16 September, against Oman.
