= Halhadar Das =

Indian cricketer (born 1986)

Personal information
- Full name: Halhadar Michu Das
- Born: 2 August 1986 (age 40); Dhenkanal, Orissa, India
- Batting: Right-handed
- Role: Wicket-keeper batsman

Domestic team information
- Years: Team
- 2005/06–2016/17: Odisha
- 2008: Deccan Chargers

Career statistics
Competition	FC	LA	T20
Matches	47	28	18
Runs scored	1,835	633	184
Batting average	27.80	28.77	18.40
100s/50s	2/10	0/4	0/1
Top score	144	88*	59*
Catches/stumpings	140/9	35/7	13/7
- Source: ESPNcricinfo

Halhadar Das (born 2 August 1986) is an Indian former cricketer. He played as a wicket-keeper batsman for Odisha. He also played for the East Zone in the Ranji Trophy, and the Deccan Chargers in the IPL. Now he represents the Michigan Cricket Stars in Minor League Cricket in the United States.
