= Shawn Findlay =

Jamaican cricketer (born 1984)

Personal information
- Full name: Shawn Eli Findlay
- Born: 3 March 1984 (age 42); Mandeville, Jamaica
- Batting: Left-handed
- Bowling: Right-arm medium

International information
- National side: West Indies
- ODI debut (cap 140): 4 July 2008 v Australia
- Last ODI: 13 January 2009 v New Zealand

Domestic team information
- Years: Team
- 2003/04—2011/12: Jamaica

Career statistics
Competition	ODI	T20I	FC	LA
Matches	9	2	11	20
Runs scored	146	32	295	352
Batting average	20.85	16.00	14.75	27.07
100s/50s	0/1	0/0	0/1	0/2
Top score	59*	19	70*	64*
Balls bowled	–	–	228	90
Wickets	–	–	1	2
Bowling average	–	–	104.00	41.00
5 wickets in innings	–	–	0	0
10 wickets in match	–	–	0	0
Best bowling	–	–	1/16	1/10
Catches/stumpings	5/–	1/–	8/–	10/–
- Source: CricketArchive, 4 May 2023

Shawn Eli Findlay (born 3 March 1984) is a Jamaican former cricketer who played for Jamaica and the West Indies cricket team.

== Career ==
Findlay never represented the West Indies in a youth international match. On 1 July 2008, Findlay was called up to the West Indies ODI squad for the last two matches of a five match series against Australia that the West Indies had already lost. After scoring 9 on his debut in the fourth ODI, Findlay went on to score 59* in a losing cause in the fifth and final match of the series; according to pundits, Findlay's performance was one of the few positives to come from the West Indies' 5–0 series loss to Australia.

In June 2021, he was selected to take part in the Minor League Cricket tournament in the United States following the players' draft.
