= Abdul Jabbar (Canadian cricketer) =

Canadian cricketer (born 1983)

Personal information
- Full name: Abdul Jabbar Chaudrey
- Born: 1 March 1983 (age 43); Rawalpindi, Punjab, Pakistan
- Batting: Right-handed
- Bowling: Right-arm medium

International information
- National side: Canada
- ODI debut (cap 48): 18 October 2007 v Kenya
- Last ODI: 20 October 2007 v Kenya

Career statistics
Competition	ODI	First-class
Matches	2	3
Runs scored	59	70
Batting average	29.50	11.66
100s/50s	0/0	0/0
Top score	44	49
Balls bowled	–	12
Wickets	–	0
Bowling average	–	–
5 wickets in innings	–	–
10 wickets in match	–	–
Best bowling	–	–
Catches/stumpings	1/–	1/–
- Source: ESPNcricinfo, 16 January 2011

Abdul Jabbar (born 1 March 1983) is a Canadian cricket player. He is a right-hand batsman and a right-arm medium pace bowler. He made his One-Day International debut for Canada on the tour to Kenya in October 2007. There, he appeared in two matches scoring 59 runs with a high score of 44 and averaging 29.50. He also was involved in two Intercontinental Cup matches against Kenya and Namibia scoring 70 runs with a high score of 49, averaging 17.50. His 49 came on his Intercontinental Cup debut against Kenya, contributing to Canada's first wicket partnership of 68.
