= Usman Rafiq =

American cricketer (born 1988)

Personal information
- Born: 13 August 1988 (age 38); Lahore, Pakistan
- Batting: Right-handed
- Bowling: Right-arm offbreak
- Role: Bowler

International information
- National side: United States
- ODI debut (cap 42): 26 June 2023 v Zimbabwe
- Last ODI: 30 June 2023 v Ireland
- Only T20I (cap 37): 13 April 2024 v Canada
- Source: Cricinfo, 13 April 2024

Usman Rafiq (born August 13, 1988) is a Pakistani-American cricketer. In January 2018, he was named in the United States squad for the 2017–18 Regional Super50 tournament in the West Indies. He made his List A debut for the United States against Guyana in the 2017–18 Regional Super50 on February 2, 2018. In June 2021, he was selected to take part in the Minor League Cricket tournament in the United States following the players' draft.
