= Umair Mir =

Pakistani cricketer (born 1990)

Personal information
- Born: 27 January 1990 (age 36); Islamabad, Pakistan
- Source: ESPNcricinfo, 28 September 2016

Umair Mir (born 27 January 1990) is a Pakistani first-class cricketer. He was part of Pakistan's squad for the 2008 Under-19 Cricket World Cup. He made his debut on 13–16 December 2007 at a Quetta vs Islamabad match played at Islamabad, with his last appearance being the Islamabad vs Karachi Blues match played at Islamabad on 31 January- 2 February 2013.
