= Bhaskar Yadram =

West Indian cricketer (born 1999)

Personal information
- Born: 18 September 1999 (age 27); Guyana
- Batting: Right-handed
- Bowling: Right-arm off break; Right-arm medium

Domestic team information
- Years: Team
- 2016/17–2017/18: Guyana
- 2019/20: Windward Islands

Career statistics
Competition	First-class	List A
Matches	3	15
Runs scored	55	184
Batting average	11.00	13.14
100s/50s	0/0	0/1
Top score	25	52
Balls bowled	42	403
Wickets	2	11
Bowling average	13.00	31.90
5 wickets in innings	0	0
10 wickets in match	0	n/a
Best bowling	2/23	4/22
Catches/stumpings	2/–	8/–
- Source: ESPNcricinfo, 10 October 2021

Bhaskar Yadram (born 18 September 1999) is a Guyanese cricketer. He made his List A debut for the West Indies Under-19s in the 2016–17 Regional Super50 on 25 January 2017. He made his first-class debut for Guyana in the 2016–17 Regional Four Day Competition on 21 April 2017.

In November 2017, he was named in the West Indies squad for the 2018 Under-19 Cricket World Cup. He was the leading wicket-taker for the West Indies in the tournament, with 11 wickets.

In October 2019, he was named in the Windward Islands' squad for the 2019–20 Regional Super50 tournament. In June 2021, he was selected to take part in the Minor League Cricket tournament in the United States following the players' draft.
