= Rajdeep Darbar =

Indian cricketer (born 1987)

Personal information
- Born: 14 September 1987 (age 39); Gadhada, India
- Source: ESPNcricinfo, 30 January 2017

Rajdeep Darbar (born 14 September 1987) is an Indian cricketer. He made his first-class debut for Gujarat in the 2010–11 Ranji Trophy on 1 November 2010. In June 2021, he was selected to take part in the Minor League Cricket tournament in the United States following the players' draft.
