= Adil Bhatti =

American cricketer (born 1989)

Personal information
- Born: October 28, 1989 (age 37); Punjab, Pakistan
- Batting: Right-handed
- Role: Bowler

International information
- National side: United States
- Source: Cricinfo, October 24, 2014

Adil Bhatti (born October 28, 1989) is an American cricketer who plays for the US national cricket team. He played in the 2014 ICC World Cricket League Division Three tournament. In January 2018, he was named in the squad for the 2017–18 Regional Super50 tournament in the West Indies. He made his List A debut for the United States in the 2017–18 Regional Super50 on 31 January 2018. In June 2021, he was selected for the Minor League Cricket tournament in the United States following the players' draft. He was in the Major League Cricket draft in 2024 and 2025.
