= Rishi Bhardwaj =

Indian cricketer (born 1986)

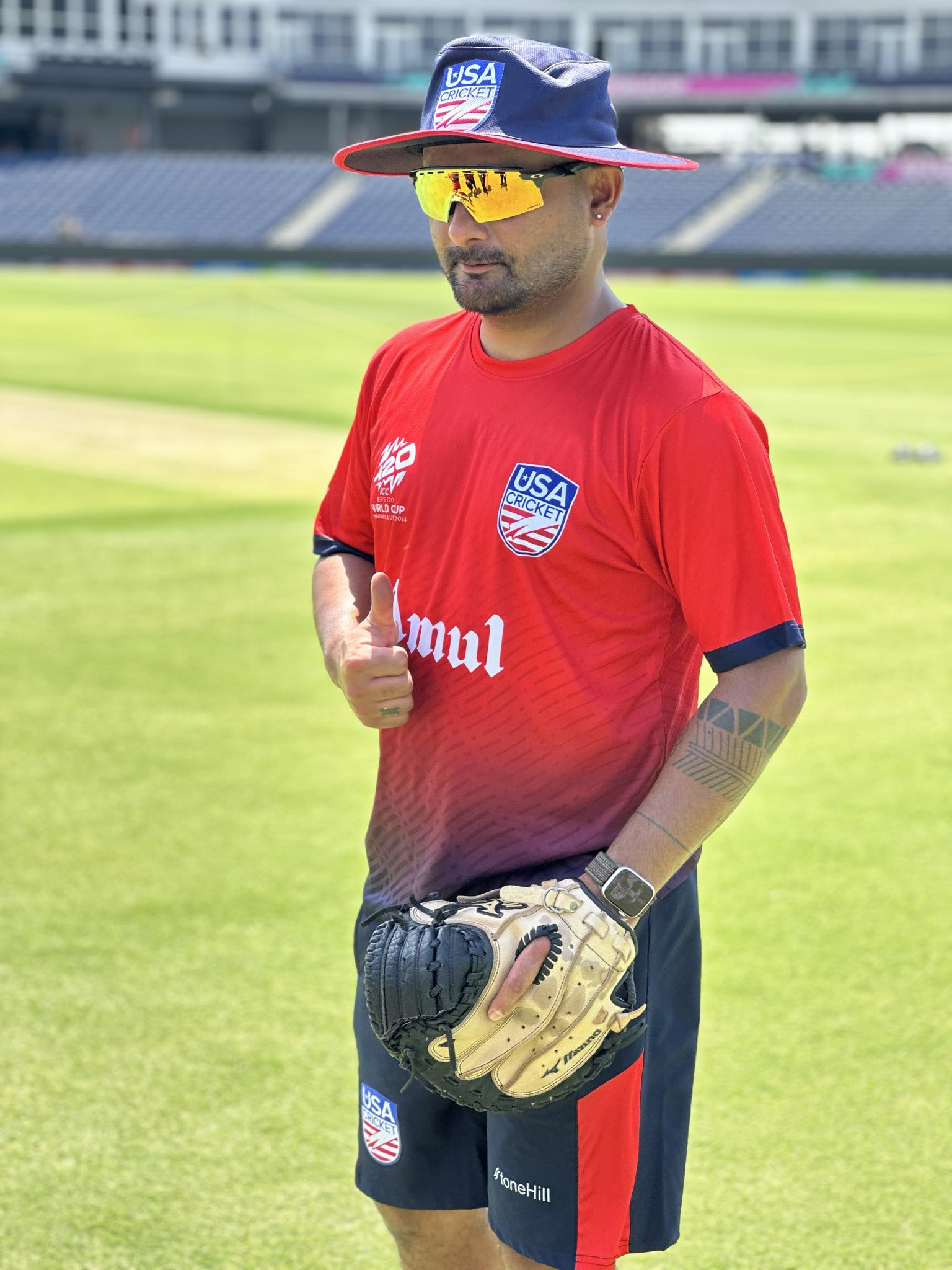

Personal information
- Born: 10 September 1986 (age 40)
- Source: Cricinfo, 5 March 2021

Rishi Bhardwaj (born 10 September 1986) is an Indian cricketer. He made his Twenty20 debut on 5 March 2021, for Kandy Customs Cricket Club in the 2020–21 SLC Twenty20 Tournament in Sri Lanka. Later in the year, he moved to the United States. In June 2021, Bhardwaj was selected to play for the Atlanta Fire in Minor League Cricket in the United States. In 2024, he was appointed as the assistant batting coach for the USA cricket team. Seattle Thunderbolts He has also worked as a coach for children who play cricket.
