= Ritwik Behera =

American cricketer (born 2003)

Personal information
- Full name: Ritwik Rasananda Behera
- Born: 10 November 2003 (age 23); Rockville, Maryland, United States
- Nickname: Chintu
- Height: 6 ft 0 in (1.83 m)
- Batting: Right-handed
- Bowling: Right Arm off break
- Role: All-rounder

International information
- National side: United States
- T20I debut (cap 22): 22 December 2021 v Ireland
- Last T20I: 23 December 2021 v Ireland
- Source: Cricinfo, December 29, 2021

Ritwik Rasananda Behera (born November 10, 2003) is an American cricketer who plays as an allrounder for the United States national cricket team.

== Career ==
Behera was born and raised in Maryland, United States with an Odia Indian immigrant family from the eastern Indian state of Cuttack, Odisha. Ritwik attended William B. Gibbs Jr. Elementary School, Roberto Clemente Middle School, and Poolesville High School in Montgomery County, Maryland before going on to study computer science at the University of Maryland.

Behera started playing cricket aged 12, coached by former India under-19 international Sunny Sohal. He made his Twenty20 International (T20I) debut on December 22, 2021, for the United States against Ireland.
