= 2023 Minor League Cricket season =

Twenty20 cricket tournament in America

- Dates: August 4, 2023 – October 7, 2023
- Administrator(s): USA Cricket; Major League Cricket
- Cricket format: Twenty20
- Tournament format(s): Round-robin and knockout
- Champions: Dallas Mustangs (1st title)
- Participants: 26
- Matches: 150
- Player of the series: Andries Gous
- Most runs: Andries Gous (DM) (516)
- Most wickets: Muditha Fernando (SDSF) (25)
- Official website: minorleaguecricket.com

The 2023 Minor League Cricket season (branded as the 2023 Sunoco Minor League Cricket championship for sponsorship reasons and sometimes shortened to 2023 MiLC) was the third season of Minor League Cricket, established by USA Cricket (USAC) and Major League Cricket (MLC) in 2019. Sunoco returned from the previous season as title sponsor, with Laxmi Foods and Bru Coffee also tapped as official sponsors. The season was hosted over 19 venues across the United States from August 4 to October 7.

The tournament was won by the Dallas Mustangs, who defeated the New Jersey Somerset Cavaliers in the finals by 44 runs, with Andries Gous of the Dallas Mustangs winning the award for the Most Valuable Player (MVP) of the tournament. The Seattle Thunderbolts were the defending champions.

== Teams and venues ==
Ahead of the 2023 season, the former Florida Beamers franchise collapsed and was discontinued, leading to the creation of the newly formed Dallas Xforia Giants. The Hollywood Master Blasters was also discontinued ahead of the season. Additionally, following a buyout by the Kingsmen Global Sports Group, the former Chicago Blasters underwent a name change to the Chicago Kingsmen, with the former DC Hawks also undergoing a name change to the Baltimore Royals.

A complete list of ground venues, along with the 2023 season's schedule, was released on July 31.

=== Pacific Conference ===
Western Division

- Silicon Valley Strikers (Bay Peninsula) – Morgan Hills Sports Complex
- Bay Blazers (East Bay) – Santa Clara Cricket Stadium
- SoCal Lashings (Los Angeles) – Leo Magnus Cricket Complex
- Golden State Grizzlies (Sacramento, California) – Arroyo Park
- San Diego Surf Riders (San Diego) – Canyonside Park
- Seattle Thunderbolts (Seattle) – Tollgate Farm Park

Central Division

- Chicago
  - Chicago Kingsmen – Kingsmen Stadium
  - Chicago Tigers – Tigers Park
- Grand Prairie Stadium (Dallas)
  - Dallas Mustangs
  - Dallas Xforia Giants
- Houston Hurricanes (Houston) – Prairie View Cricket Complex
- Lone Star Athletics (Austin) – Moosa Stadium
- Michigan Cricket Stars (Michigan) –
- St. Louis Americans (St. Louis) – ACAC Park

=== Atlantic Conference ===
Eastern Division

- Mercer County Park (Mercer County, New Jersey)
  - New England Eagles (Boston)
  - NJ Somerset Cavaliers (Somerset, New Jersey)
  - New Jersey Stallions (Jersey City, New Jersey)
  - Manhattan Yorkers (New York)
- Empire State Titans (New York City) – Glenville Cricket Complex
- The Philadelphians (Philadelphia) – Hatfield Park
- Baltimore Royals (Baltimore) –

Southern Division

- (Atlanta)
  - Atlanta Fire – Param Veers Cricket Field
  - Atlanta Lightning – Atlanta Cricket Field
- Orlando Galaxy (Orlando, Florida) –
- Morrisville Raptors (Morrisville, North Carolina) – Church Street Park
- Ft. Lauderdale Lions (Fort Lauderdale, Florida) – Broward County Stadium
* – Western Division (Pacific Conference)
- – Central Division (Pacific Conference)
- – Eastern Division (Atlantic Conference)
- – Southern Division (Atlantic Conference)

== Squads ==
A team could select a minimum of 14 players in their squad, going up to a maximum of 18 players. The teams released their squads shortly before the start of the season.

Atlanta Fire

- Corné Dry
- Nasir Hossain
- Aaron Jones
- Jahmar Hamilton
- Zain Sayed
- Amila Aponso
- Jay Pathak
- Viraj Vaghela
- Nasik Khan
- Ridwan Palash
- Venukalyan Madireddy
- Ishan Sharma
- Ateendra Subramanian
- Rishi Pandey
- Neeshad Singh

Atlanta Lightning

- Phani Simhadri
- Heath Richards
- Kyle Phillip
- Mark Parchment
- Hanchard Hamilton
- Sagar Patel
- Cassius Burton
- Neive McNally
- Aran Chenchu
- Akhil Posa
- Unmukt Chand
- Heer Patel
- Danush Kaveripakam
- Romario King
- Nitish Sudini

Ft. Lauderdale Lions

- Adam Khan
- Bryan Gayle
- Danza Hyatt
- Elton Tucker Jr.
- Herlando Johnson
- Isaiah Rajah
- Javelle Glenn
- Kesrick Williams
- Kevin Stoute
- Marvin Darlington
- Omari Williams
- Rohan Ebanks
- Shuaib Syed
- Tagenarine Chanderpaul
- Lenroy Whyte
- Zachary Sattaur
- Antonio Scott
- Ricky Nayar

Morrisville Raptors

- Abhiram Bolisetty
- Aditya Ghode
- Aditya Gupta
- Aditya Padala
- Ansh Rai
- Dane Piedt
- Evroy Dyer
- Franklin Clement
- Karthikeya Jagadish
- Muhammad Abdullah
- Rasesh Behera
- Rohan Phadke
- Ryan Wiggins
- Sanjay Stanley
- Sarnam Patel
- Trevon Griffith
- Utkarsh Srivastava
- Vinothkumar Kandaswamy

Orlando Galaxy

- Advait Varadarajan
- Bhaskaradipan Gnanasakthi
- Brynley Richards
- Devarshi Patel
- Dimitri Adams
- Dev Patel
- Hardik Desai
- Koushik Saha
- Manav Patel
- Matthew Comerie
- Meetul Patel
- Naseer Khan
- Rohit Dutchin
- Sumit Sehrawat
- William Trigar
- Hedo Leslie
- Kishun Balgobin

Baltimore Royals

- Sarabjit Ladda
- Jaskaran Malhotra
- Ravi Inder Singh
- Shamy Ghotra
- Keon Joseph
- Paul Palmer
- Sahil Kapoor
- Abdulahad Malik
- Neil Narvekar
- Pranto Ahmed
- Shrey Parmer
- Ritwik Behera
- Aaryan Batra
- Pargat Singh
- Bipul Sharma
- Aditya Venkatesh
- Derval Green
- Omkar Zope

Empire State Titans

- Adil Bhatti
- Aman Patel
- Chintan Patel
- Christopher van Tull
- Deepak Puttur
- Dev Salian
- Javon Searles
- Keval Patel
- Kwame Patton Jr.
- Mario Lobban
- Savan Patel
- Tohidul Islam
- Towker Khan
- Vansh Patel
- Vidyut Rajagopal

Manhattan Yorkers

- Abhyajit Khangura
- Danesh Patel
- Deep Joshi
- Deep Patel
- Dhruv Pawar
- Hiram Shallow
- Hiren Patel
- Manoj Acharya
- Miraaj Naidu
- Nisarg Desai
- Prannav Chettipalayam
- Preet Shah
- Rahul Mishra
- Santosh Sama
- Shiv Patel
- Surya Thurumella
- Vanditkumar Prajapati

New England Eagles

- Akshay Homraj
- Amit Patil
- Apurva Maheshram
- Azher Ali
- Burhan Saeed
- Christopher Barnwell
- Dinesh Gopi
- Gourav Grover
- Hemendra Ramdihal
- Jaladh Dua
- Rizwan Mazhar
- Samarth Tiwari
- Shaswat Ganisshan
- Sriram Velmurugan
- Sushant Modani

New Jersey Somerset Cavaliers

- Abdullah Ghazi
- Ahmed Labib
- Arya Garg
- Chandrapaul Hemraj
- Junaid Mahsood
- Karima Gore
- Noman Iftikhar
- Pranav Rao
- Richard Allen
- Saad Bin Zafar
- Shawn Findlay
- Steven Katwaroo
- Sunny Patel
- Abdullah Syed
- Waleed Karimullah
- Xavier Marshall
- Yasir Mohammad

New Jersey Stallions

- Arjun Vajjala
- Bhaskar Yadram
- Cameron Delport
- Derone Davis
- Dominique Rikhi
- Jasdeep Singh
- Karan Patel
- Monank Patel
- Raahil Amarshi
- Raymond Ramrattan
- Sachin Mylavarapu
- Saiteja Mukkamalla
- Shayaan Saad
- Siddarth Matani
- Stephen Wiig
- Varun Mantha

The Philadelphians

- Aaron Johnson
- Abdul Mohammed
- Aditya Sharma
- Anirudh Immanuel
- Chiranshu Bhatia
- Derick Narine
- Deveshwari Prashad
- Gauranshu Sharma
- Jonathan Foo
- Juanoy Drysdale
- Liam Plunkett
- Mario Rampersaud
- Raj Nannan
- Rajdeep Darbar
- Ryan Scott
- Sivaram Sharma
- Soripul Islam
- Trinson Carmichael

Lone Star Athletics

- Ali Nasir
- Arya Kannantha
- Gourav Bajaj
- Hamza Khalid
- Josh Saripella
- Laksh Parikh
- Milind Kumar
- Nitish Kumar
- Pawan Suyal
- Pranav Bhattad
- Shahiq Memon
- Shayan Jahangir
- Shreyan A
- Shubham Ranjane
- Sidhesh Pathare

Chicago Kingsmen

- Aayush Thakkar
- Ahsan Ahmed
- Ali Samad
- Anwar Ali
- Asif Mehmood
- Haseeb Azam
- Hassan Khan
- Kevin Phillip
- Manav Brahmbhatt
- Mir Hamza
- Najam Iqbal
- Shaheer Hasan
- Sharjeel Khan
- Saad Ali
- Tajinder Singh
- Zia-ul-Haq
- Fawad Alam

Chicago Tigers

- Calvin Savage
- Cody Chetty
- Datta Prakash
- Deepchand Pinnaka
- Ferhan Ali
- Jay Desai
- Jay Patel
- Karan Kumar
- Kumar Subramanian
- Manan Patel
- Mittansh Nithiyanandam
- Mohit Patel
- Mujeed Ahmed
- Pruthvish Patel
- Rahul Basu
- Shiv Shani
- Tirth Patel
- Vineet Sinha

Houston Hurricanes

- Ahsan Shah
- Ali Khan
- Arir Ali
- Asad Shafiq
- Hamza Bangash
- Hassan Rashid
- Huzefa Ahmed
- Joshua Tromp
- Karthik Gattepalli
- Matthew Tromp
- Mukhtar Ahmed
- Rayaan Bhagani
- Saif Badar
- Saqlain Haider
- Usman Ashraf
- Usman Rafiq

Dallas Mustangs

- Adnan Haroon
- Ali Shiekh
- Andries Gous
- Corey Anderson
- Ehsan Adil
- Hammad Azam
- Jannisar Khan
- Kosala Kulasekara
- Naseer Jamali
- Nauman Anwar
- Nosthush Kenjige
- Prathamesh Pawar
- Rishi Ramesh
- Rushil Ugarkar
- Salman Irshad
- Sujith Gowda

Dallas Xforia Giants

- Aakarshit Gomel
- Abhinav Choudhary
- Abhiram Valisammagari
- Advaith Jagannath
- Ajay Masand
- Akhilesh Bodugum
- Ankit Khera
- Chaitanya Bishnoi
- Harmeet Singh
- Pranav Narsetty
- Rameez Raja
- Rehman Dar
- Sachin Asokan
- Sankirth Batthula
- Smit Patel

Michigan Cricket Stars

- Abul Hasan
- Akhil Kumar
- Anas Mahmood
- Aryan Patel
- Kamran Shaikh
- Mohammad Mohsin
- Muhammad Kamal
- Mohammad Waqas
- Raj Vyas
- Rayyan Mohammed
- Rizwan Cheema
- Santhosh Ramasamy
- Mufassir Ali
- Zeeshan Maqsood
- Zia Khan

St. Louis Americans

- Adada Tarunsai
- Ahmed Ali Mir
- Angad Bhatia
- Arnav Jhamb
- Bhavya Mehta
- Justin Dill
- Kranthi Kumar
- Nikhil Kanchan
- Parth Mehta
- Sam Das
- Sandeep Sivaram
- Siddhant Shah
- Shaunak Manjure
- Sudhanshu Bajpai
- Ujjwal Vinnakota

Bay Blazers

- Aakash Sundraresan
- Abhi Singh
- Abhishek Paradkar
- Adithya Ganesh
- Amogh Arepally
- Angelo Perera
- Brody Couch
- Carmi le Roux
- David White
- Hamza Tariq
- Harikrishnan Nair
- Mohammad Katawazai
- Musadiq Ahmed
- Rudrik Suthar
- Rusty Theron
- Sanjay Krishnamurthi
- Srimantha Wijeyeratne
- Vikash Mohan

Golden State Grizzlies

- Anthony Bramble
- Asad Khan
- Dilpreet Billing
- Kakani Harish
- John Bangaru
- Karan Chandel
- Khalid Atrifi
- Mohit Nataraj
- Neeraj Goel
- Pranavh Pradeep
- Sadaf Hussain
- Sami Aslam
- Shivam Mishra
- Sohan Bhat
- Tejas Makineedi
- Varad Kane
- Vatsal Vaghela
- Zia Shahzad

San Diego Surf Riders

- Muhammad Abbas
- Abhinay Reddy
- Adit Gorawara
- Adnesh Tondale
- Burhan Bharmal
- Chad Breetzke
- Devam Shrivastava
- Muditha Fernando
- Greg Hay
- Jaideep Reddy
- Karthik Venuri
- Marty Kain
- Nikhil Dutta
- Nisarg Patel
- Pratik Desai
- Anantha Raju
- Vedant Jain

Seattle Thunderbolts

- Cinci Siegertsz
- Dev Singh
- Dilpreet Singh
- Harsh Thaker
- Jagroop Raina
- Mansingh Nigade
- Mehdi Hasan
- Nital Vasavada
- Mudi Prajith
- Rahul Nama
- Rishi Bhardwaj
- Sanat Mishra
- Shadley van Schalkwyk
- Shashwat Kohli

Silicon Valley Strikers

- Anshul Singh
- Arsh Buch
- Dev Thadani
- Gary Graham
- Kulvinder Singh
- Lahiru Milantha
- Mohak Buch
- Pankaj Kumar Rao
- Pranay Suri
- Rahul Jariwala
- Rounak Rao
- Ruchir Joshi
- Saurabh Netravalkar
- Shehan Jayasuriya
- Siddhant Senthil
- Srinivas Raghavan
- Umang Parikh

SoCal Lashings

- Abhimanyu Rajp
- Ayan Desai
- Daksh Prabhu
- Elmore Hutchinson
- Harpreet Singh
- James Seymour
- Jaykishan Plaha
- Mrunal Patel
- Pranay Pagydyala
- Rajveer Khosa
- Ravi Timbawala
- Rubal Raina
- Ruben Clinton
- Sanchit Sandhu
- Uzair Siddiqui
- Wais Quraishi
- Zaid Tariq
- Zohaib Ahmed

== Results ==
=== Atlantic Conference ===
Home \ Away	NEE	NJSC	NJS	EST	MY	TP	BR	AF	AL	FLL	MR	OG
Eagles	—	2–1	0–2	2–0	0–1	1–1	–	–	–	–	–	–
Cavaliers	1–2	—	2–1	1–1	2–0	1–1	–	1–0	1–0	–	–	–
Stallions	2–0	1–2	—	2–0	1–1	0–2	–	–	–	–	–	–
Titans	0–2	1–1	0–2	—	2–0	0–1	–	–	–	–	–	–
Yorkers	1–0	0–2	1–1	0–2	—	0–2	–	–	–	–	–	–
Philadelphians	1–1	2–1	2–0	1–0	2–0	—	–	0–1	0–1	–	–	–
Royals	–	–	–	–	–	–	—	0–1	0–2	1–1	1–1	2–0
Fire	–	0–1	–	–	–	1–0	1–0	—	0–2	2–1	2–0	2–0
Lightning	–	0–1	–	–	–	1–0	2–0	2–1	—	1–1	0–0	2–0
Lions	–	–	–	–	–	–	1–1	1–2	1–1	—	0–0	2–0
Raptors	–	–	–	–	–	–	1–1	0–2	0–0	0–0	—	1–1
Galaxy	–	–	–	–	–	–	0–2	0–2	0–2	0–2	1–1	—

Updated to match(es) played on September 30, 2023. Source: Minor League Cricket
Legend: Blue = home team win; Yellow = draw; Red = away team win.
For upcoming matches, an "a" indicates there is an article about the rivalry between the two participants.

=== Pacific Conference ===
Home \ Away	SVS	EBB	SCL	GSG	SDR	ST	LSA	CK	CT	DM	DXG	HH	MCS	SLA
Strikers	—	0–1	1–1	2–0	2–0	1–1	–	–	–	–	–	–	–	–
Blazers	1–0	—	2–0	2–0	2–0	1–1	–	–	–	–	–	–	–	–
Lashings	1–1	0–2	—	0–2	2–0	1–1	–	–	–	–	–	–	–	–
Grizzlies	0–2	0–2	2–0	—	1–1	1–1	–	–	–	–	–	–	–	–
Riders	0–2	0–2	0–2	1–1	—	2–0	–	–	–	–	–	–	–	–
Thunderbolts	1–1	1–1	1–1	1–1	0–2	—	–	–	–	–	–	–	–	–
Athletics	–	–	–	–	–	–	—	0–0	1–0	1–1	1–1	1–1	0–1	1–0
Kingsmen	–	–	–	–	–	–	0–0	—	0–1	1–0	0–1	1–0	0–1	2–0
Tigers	–	–	–	–	–	–	0–1	1–0	—	0–1	0–1	0–1	0–2	1–1
Mustangs	–	–	–	–	–	–	1–1	0–1	1–0	—	2–0	2–0	1–0	1–0
Giants	–	–	–	–	–	–	1–1	1–0	1–0	0–2	—	1–1	1–0	0–0
Hurricanes	–	–	–	–	–	–	1–1	0–1	1–0	0–2	1–1	—	0–1	1–0
Stars	–	–	–	–	–	–	1–0	1–0	2–0	0–1	1–0	0–1	—	1–1
Americans	–	–	–	–	–	–	0–1	0–2	1–1	0–1	0–0	0–1	1–1	—

Updated to match(es) played on August 11, 2023. Source: Minor League Cricket
Legend: Blue = home team win; Yellow = draw; Red = away team win.
For upcoming matches, an "a" indicates there is an article about the rivalry between the two participants.

== League stage ==
The league stage ran from August 5 to September 17.

=== Atlantic Conference ===
==== Southern Division ====
Pos	Team	Pld	W	L	NR	Pts	NRR
1	Atlanta Lightning	10	7	1	2	16	1.681
2	Atlanta Fire	10	6	3	1	13	1.272
3	Ft. Lauderdale Lions	10	5	3	2	12	−0.254
4	Baltimore Royals	10	4	5	1	9	0.425
5	Morrisville Raptors	10	2	4	4	8	−0.256
6	Orlando Galaxy	10	1	9	0	2	−2.478

Updated to match(es) played on September 17, 2023. Source: Minor League Cricket
- Top three teams move on
- advances to Super 8s
- advances to Knockout stage
Division matches

August 5, 2023
2:30 PM (EST)
Scorecard

Morrisville Raptors; 157/5 (20 overs)	v	Baltimore Royals; 160/4 (19.4 overs)
Trevon Griffith 52 (43); Sarabjit Ladda 3/32 (4 overs)		Abdulahad Malik 71 (50); Aditya Padala 2/20 (3.4 overs)

Baltimore Royals won by 6 wickets (with 2 balls remaining)
Church Street Park, Morrisville
Umpires: Tarak Janapareddy and Vijaya Mallela
Player of the match: Abdulahad Malik (BR)

- Baltimore Royals won the toss and elected to bowl

August 6, 2023
8:30 AM (EST)
Scorecard

Baltimore Royals; 160/6 (20 overs)	v	Morrisville Raptors; 161/5 (19 overs)
Ravi Inder Singh 46 (38); Aditya Padala 2/37 (4 overs)		Trevon Griffith 77* (47); Bipul Sharma 1/19 (4 overs)

Morrisville Raptors won by 5 wickets (with 6 balls remaining)
Church Street Park, Morrisville
Umpires: Vijaya Mallela and Alvin Burnett
Player of the match: Trevon Griffith (MR)

- Baltimore Royals won the toss and elected to bat

August 12, 2023
6:00 PM (EST)
Scorecard

Orlando Galaxy; 81 (16.5 overs)	v	Baltimore Royals; 82/3 (12 overs)
Jaskaran Malhotra 38 (33); Dimitri Adams 2/32 (4 overs)		Rohit Dutchin 32 (25); Bipul Sharma 3/5 (1.5 overs)

Baltimore Royals won by 7 wickets (with 48 balls remaining)
Church Street Park, Morrisville
Umpires: Vijaya Mallela and Rahul Patwardhan
Player of the match: Shamy Ghotra (BR)

- Baltimore Royals won the toss and elected to bowl

August 13, 2023
12:00 PM (EST)
Scorecard

Baltimore Royals; 140 (20 overs)	v	Orlando Galaxy; 64 (17.4 overs)
Naseer Ahmed 25 (24); Sarabjit Ladda 5/17 (4 overs)		Jaskaran Malhotra 52 (49); Sumit Sehrawat 5/20 (4 overs)

Baltimore Royals won by 76 runs
Church Street Park, Morrisville
Umpires: Alvin Burnett and Rahul Patwardhan
Player of the match: Sarabjit Ladda (BR)

- Orlando Galaxy won the toss and elected to bowl

August 19, 2023
10:45 AM (EST)
Scorecard

Atlanta Fire; 190/7 (20 overs)	v	Orlando Galaxy; 60 (16.3 overs)
Jahmar Hamilton 56* (32); Sumit Sehrawat 4/49 (4 overs)		Advait Varadarajan 19 (39); Amila Aponso 4/9 (4 overs)

Atlanta Fire won by 130 runs
Param Veers Cricket Field, Georgia
Umpires: Nur Uddin and Conrad Rogers
Player of the match: Amila Aponso (AF)

- Orlando Galaxy won the toss and elected to bowl

August 19, 2023
3:00 PM (EST)
Scorecard

Atlanta Lightning; 167/9 (20 overs)	v	Ft. Lauderdale Lions; 140/5 (20 overs)
Sagar Patel 32 (28); Vinit Tagarse 5/23 (4 overs)		Tagenarine Chanderpaul 60* (43); Pankaj Kumar Rao 1/22 (4 overs)

Atlanta Lightning won by 27 runs
Param Veers Cricket Field, Georgia
Umpires: Judson Edwards and Sandip Gondhalekar
Player of the match: Hussain Talat (AL)

- Atlanta Lightning won the toss and elected to bat

August 20, 2023
10:15 AM (EST)
Scorecard

Ft. Lauderdale Lions; 146/4 (20 overs)	v	Atlanta Lightning; 134/7 (20 overs)
Tagenarine Chanderpaul 46 (39); Cassius Burton 1/15 (3 overs)		Mark Parchment 37 (39); Kevin Stoute 5/16 (4 overs)

Ft. Lauderdale Lions won by 12 runs
Param Veers Cricket Field, Georgia
Umpires: Nur Uddin and Judson Edwards
Player of the match: Kevin Stoute (FLL)

- Atlanta Lightning won the toss and elected to bowl

August 20, 2023
2:15 PM (EST)
Scorecard

Orlando Galaxy; 83 (19 overs)	v	Atlanta Fire; 88/4 (12.1 overs)
Dimitri Adams 17 (21); Corné Dry 5/18 (4 overs)		Kennar Lewis 52 (33); Bhaskaradipan Gnanasakthi 3/13 (3 overs)

Atlanta Fire won by 6 wickets (with 47 balls remaining)
Param Veers Cricket Field, Georgia
Umpires: Judson Edwards and Conrad Rogers
Player of the match: Corné Dry (AF)

- Orlando Galaxy won the toss and elected to bat

August 26, 2023
2:15 PM (EST)
Scorecard

Atlanta Fire; 133/9 (20 overs)	v	Atlanta Lightning; 136/6 (18.3 overs)
Kennar Lewis 50 (30); Hussain Talat 3/17 (4 overs)		Jesse Bootan 39* (27); Nasir Hossain 2/18 (4 overs)

Atlanta Lightning won by 4 wickets (with 9 balls remaining)
Param Veers Cricket Field, Georgia
Umpires: Sandip Gondhalekar and Conrad Rogers
Player of the match: Junaid Siddiqui (AL)

- Atlanta Fire won the toss and elected to bat

August 26, 2023
6:30 PM (EST)
Scorecard

Orlando Galaxy; 121/7 (20 overs)	v	Ft. Lauderdale Lions; 125/4 (16.4 overs)
Advait Varadarajan 56 (48); Isaiah Rajah 2/18 (4 overs)		Kevin Stoute 37* (32); Dimitri Adams 2/25 (4 overs)

Ft. Lauderdale Lions won by 6 wickets (with 20 balls remaining)
Broward County Stadium, Florida
Umpires: Alwin Salmon and Max Diah
Player of the match: Kevin Stoute (FLL)

- Ft. Lauderdale Lions won the toss and elected to bowl

August 27, 2023
2:15 PM (EST)
Scorecard

Atlanta Lightning; 176/6 (20 overs)	v	Atlanta Fire; 158/9 (20 overs)
Sagar Patel 59* (48); Jeremy Gordon 3/23 (4 overs)		Corné Dry 41* (32); Hussain Talat 4/23 (4 overs)

Atlanta Lightning won by 18 runs
Param Veers Cricket Field, Georgia
Umpires: Conrad Rogers and Nur Uddin
Player of the match: Sagar Patel (AL)

- Atlanta Lightning won the toss and elected to bat

August 27, 2023
6:00 PM (EST)
Scorecard

Ft. Lauderdale Lions; 160 (20 overs)	v	Orlando Galaxy; 151/8 (20 overs)
Tagenarine Chanderpaul 77 (49); Hardik Desai 3/17 (3 overs)		Meetul Patel 42 (43); Kevin Stoute 4/31 (4 overs)

Ft. Lauderdale Lions won by 9 runs
Broward County Stadium, Florida
Umpires: Billy Taylor (ENG) and David Maitland (USA)
Player of the match: Tagenarine Chanderpaul (FLL)

- Orlando Galaxy won the toss and elected to bowl

September 1, 2023
10:30 AM (EST)
Scorecard

Atlanta Fire; 148/7 (20 overs)	v	Morrisville Raptors; 129/6 (20 overs)
Obus Pienaar 46 (30); Evroy Dyer 2/21 (4 overs)		Dane Piedt 36* (28); Amila Aponso 2/15 (4 overs)

Atlanta Fire won by 19 runs
Param Veers Cricket Field, Georgia
Umpires: Rushane Samuels and Conrad Rogers
Player of the match: Obus Pienaar (AF)

- Morrisville Raptors won the toss and elected to bowl

September 1, 2023
12:45 PM (EST)
Scorecard

Baltimore Royals; 178/6 (20 overs)	v	Ft. Lauderdale Lions; 107 (15 overs)
Abdulahad Malik 57* (36); Kevin Stoute 2/31 (4 overs)		Tagenarine Chanderpaul 30 (25); Sarabjit Ladda 4/16 (3 overs)

Baltimore Royals won by 71 runs
Param Veers Cricket Field, Georgia
Umpires: Nur Uddin and Judson Edwards
Player of the match: Abdulahad Malik (BR)

- Ft. Lauderdale Lions won the toss and elected to bowl

September 1, 2023
2:30 PM (EST)
Scorecard

Atlanta Lightning; 154/7 (20 overs)	v	Orlando Galaxy; 56 (16.1 overs)
Mark Parchment 52 (40); Praveen Borra 3/26 (3 overs)		Dimitri Adams 18 (24); Phani Simhadri 2/6 (3 overs)

Atlanta Lightning won by 98 runs
Param Veers Cricket Field, Georgia
Umpires: Rushane Samuels and Anvesh Achanta
Player of the match: Mark Parchment (AL)

- Orlando Galaxy won the toss and elected to bowl

September 2, 2023
10:30 AM (EST)
Scorecard

Ft. Lauderdale Lions; 98/8 (20 overs)	v	Atlanta Fire; 100/7 (17 overs)
Ashley Nurse 42* (36); Corné Dry 2/5 (3 overs)		Nasir Hossain 22* (42); Ashley Nurse 3/16 (4 overs)

Atlanta Fire won by 3 wickets (with 18 balls remaining)
Param Veers Cricket Field, Georgia
Umpires: Nur Uddin and Aditya Gajjar
Player of the match: Nasir Hossain (AF)

- Atlanta Fire won the toss and elected to bowl

September 2, 2023
12:45 PM (EST)
Scorecard

Baltimore Royals; 96/9 (20 overs)	v	Atlanta Lightning; 97/3 (10.5 overs)
Bipul Sharma 24* (19); Phani Simhadri 4/19 (4 overs)		Unmukt Chand 43* (27); Shamy Ghotra 1/9 (2 overs); Aaryan Batra 1/9 (2 overs)

Atlanta Lightning won by 7 wickets (with 57 balls remaining)
Param Veers Cricket Field, Georgia
Umpires: Rushane Samuels and Conrad Rogers
Player of the match: Phani Simhadri (AL)

- Atlanta Lightning won the toss and elected to bowl

September 2, 2023
2:30 PM (EST)
Scorecard

Orlando Galaxy; 119/7 (20 overs)	v	Morrisville Raptors; 120/4 (18.2 overs)
Rohit Dutchin 24 (23); Trevon Griffith 2/13 (3 overs)		Trevon Griffith 45 (44); Kishaun Balgobin 2/12 (4 overs)

Morrisville Raptors won by 6 wickets (with 10 balls remaining)
Param Veers Cricket Field, Georgia
Umpires: Judson Edwards and Nur Uddin
Player of the match: Trevon Griffith (MR)

- Orlando Galaxy won the toss and elected to bowl

September 3, 2023
10:30 AM (EST)
Scorecard

Baltimore Royals; 116/8 (20 overs)	v	Ft. Lauderdale Lions; 119/4 (18.3 overs)
Sahil Kapoor 35* (34); Achilles Browne 2/8 (3 overs)		Tagenarine Chanderpaul 40 (41); Derval Green 1/22 (4 overs)

Ft. Lauderdale Lions won by 6 wickets (with 9 balls remaining)
Param Veers Cricket Field, Georgia
Umpires: Rushane Samuels and Anvesh Achanta
Player of the match: Kevin Stoute (FLL)

- Ft. Lauderdale Lions won the toss and elected to bowl

September 3, 2023
12:30 PM (EST)
Scorecard

Orlando Galaxy; 107/8 (20 overs)	v	Atlanta Lightning; 110/2 (16.4 overs)
Advait Varadarajan 33 (38); Hussain Talat 1/7 (2 overs)		Unmukt Chand 57 (45); Hoyito Leslie 1/18 (4 overs)

Atlanta Lightning won by 8 wickets (with 20 balls remaining)
Param Veers Cricket Field, Georgia
Umpires: Conrad Rogers and Nur Uddin
Player of the match: Unmukt Chand (AL)

- Orlando Galaxy won the toss and elected to bat

September 3, 2023
2:30 PM (EST)
Scorecard

Morrisville Raptors; 144/5 (20 overs)	v	Atlanta Fire; 150/3 (18.2 overs)
Trevon Griffith 67 (54); Corné Dry 3/26 (4 overs)		Aaron Jones 58 (35); Rohan Phadke 2/27 (4 overs)

Atlanta Fire won by 7 wickets (with 10 balls remaining)
Param Veers Cricket Field, Georgia
Umpires: Anvesh Achanta and Rushane Samuels
Player of the match: Aaron Jones (AF)

- Morrisville Raptors won the toss and elected to bat

September 4, 2023
10:30 AM (EST)
Scorecard

Orlando Galaxy; 142/9 (20 overs)	v	Morrisville Raptors; 133 (19.3 overs)
Advait Varadarajan 27 (29); Dane Piedt 2/21 (4 overs)		Sanjay Stanley 43 (34); Sumit Sehrawat 3/23 (4 overs)

Orlando Galaxy won by 9 runs
Param Veers Cricket Field, Georgia
Umpires: Anvesh Achanta and Nur Uddin
Player of the match: Hardik Desai (OG)

- Morrisville Raptors won the toss and elected to bowl

September 4, 2023
12:45 PM (EST)
Scorecard

Atlanta Fire; 120/9 (20 overs)	v	Ft. Lauderdale Lions; 121/4 (17 overs)
Obus Pienaar 63 (50); Adam Khan 2/20 (4 overs)		Danza Hyatt 56 (36); Amila Aponso 2/14 (4 overs)

Ft. Lauderdale Lions won by 6 wickets (with 18 balls remaining)
Param Veers Cricket Field, Georgia
Umpires: Aditya Gajjar and Conrad Rogers
Player of the match: Danza Hyatt (FLL)

- Ft. Lauderdale Lions won the toss and elected to bowl

September 4, 2023
2:30 PM (EST)
Scorecard

Atlanta Lightning; 114 (19.2 overs)	v	Baltimore Royals; 83 (19.2 overs)
Hussain Talat 32 (34); Shamy Ghotra 3/28 (3 overs)		Jaskaran Malhotra 23 (38); Neive McNally 3/6 (4 overs)

Atlanta Lightning won by 31 runs
Param Veers Cricket Field, Georgia
Umpires: Anvesh Achanta and Nur Uddin
Player of the match: Neive McNally (AL)

- Atlanta Lightning won the toss and elected to bat

September 8, 2023
6:00 PM (EST)
Scorecard

Atlanta Fire; 110/6 (20 overs)	v	Baltimore Royals; 88 (19.1 overs)
Aaron Jones 29 (23); Jaskaran Malhotra 2/18 (4 overs)		Pargat Singh 17 (21); Jeremy Gordon 3/22 (4 overs)

Atlanta Fire won by 22 runs
Param Veers Cricket Field, Georgia
Umpires: Alvin Burnett and Tarak Janapareddy
Player of the match: Obus Pienaar (AF)

- Baltimore Royals won the toss and elected to bowl

September 9, 2023
1:00 PM (EST)
Scorecard

Atlanta Fire	v	Baltimore Royals

Play abandoned
Church Street Park, North Carolina
Umpires: Tarak Janapareddy and Rahul Patwardhan

- Atlanta Fire won the toss and elected to bat

September 9, 2023
6:00 PM (EST)
Scorecard

Morrisville Raptors	v	Atlanta Lightning

Play abandoned
Church Street Park, North Carolina
Umpires: Alvin Burnett and Rahul Patwardhan

- Morrisville Raptors won the toss and elected to bat

September 10, 2023
2:00 PM (EST)
Scorecard

Atlanta Lightning	v	Morrisville Raptors

Play abandoned
Church Street Park, North Carolina
Umpires: Alvin Burnett and Tarak Janapareddy

September 16, 2023
6:00 PM (EST)
Scorecard

Ft. Lauderdale Lions	v	Morrisville Raptors

Play abandoned
Broward County Stadium, Florida
Umpires: Alwin Salmon and Josef Baptiste

September 17, 2023
12:30 PM (EST)
Scorecard

Morrisville Raptors; 109/2 (14 overs)	v	Ft. Lauderdale Lions
Trevon Griffith 53* (38); Isaiah Rajah 1/5 (1 over)

Play abandoned
Broward County Stadium, Florida
Umpires: Josef Baptiste and Max Diah

- Morrisville Raptors won the toss and elected to bat

==== Eastern Division ====
Pos	Team	Pld	W	L	NR	Pts	NRR
1	The Philadelphians	10	6	2	2	14	0.774
2	New Jersey Stallions	10	6	4	0	12	0.474
3	NJ Somerset Cavaliers	10	5	4	1	11	0.299
4	New England Eagles	10	5	4	1	11	−0.092
5	Empire State Titans	10	3	6	1	7	−1.679
6	Manhattan Yorkers	10	2	7	1	5	−1.270

Updated to match(es) played on September 17, 2023. Source: Minor League Cricket
- Top three teams move on
- advances to Super 8s
- advances to Knockout stage
Division matches

August 4, 2023
10:30 AM (EST)
Scorecard

New Jersey Stallions; 94/8 (20 overs)	v	Manhattan Yorkers; 95/4 (19.1 overs)
Raymond Ramrattan 18 (28); Dhruv Pawar 2/6 (4 overs)		Hiren Patel 32 (42); Sachin Mylavarapu 1/16 (4 overs); Stephen Wiig 1/12 (3 overs)

Manhattan Yorkers won by 6 wickets (with 5 balls remaining)
Mercer County Park, New Jersey
Umpires: Ivy Mahabir and Mihir Patel
Player of the match: Dhruv Pawar (MY)

- Manhattan Yorkers won the toss and elected to bowl

August 5, 2023
9:30 AM (EST)
Scorecard

New Jersey Stallions; 100/6 (20 overs)	v	The Philadelphians; 101/5 (15.5 overs)
Cameron Delport 21 (27); Jonathan Foo 2/10 (4 overs)		Ryan Scott 51 (27); Derone Davis 3/26 (3.5 overs)

The Philadelphians won by 5 wickets (with 25 balls remaining)
Mercer County Park, New Jersey
Umpires: Colin Edwards and Ritesh Patel
Player of the match: Ryan Scott (TP)

- The Philadelphians won the toss and elected to bowl

August 6, 2023
11:00 AM (EST)
Scorecard

NJ Somerset Cavaliers; 133/5 (20 overs)	v	Manhattan Yorkers; 82/9 (20 overs)
Chandrapaul Hemraj 56 (50); Rahul Mishra 2/19 (2 overs)		Deep Joshi 23 (29); Junaid Mahsood 3/10 (4 overs)

NJ Somerset Cavaliers won by 51 runs
Mercer County Park, New Jersey
Umpires: Bryan Caine and Erfanullah Syed
Player of the match: Chandrapaul Hemraj (NJSC)

- Manhattan Yorkers won the toss and elected to bowl

August 7, 2023
11:00 AM (EST)
Scorecard

NJ Somerset Cavaliers	v	The Philadelphians

Play abandoned
Mercer County Park, New Jersey
Umpires: Bryan Caine and Mihir Patel

- The Philadelphians won the toss and elected to bat

August 12, 2023
2:30 PM (EST)
Scorecard

New England Eagles; 111/9 (20 overs)	v	NJ Somerset Cavaliers; 68 (16.3 overs)
Rizwan Mazhar 56 (40); Saad Bin Zafar 2/14 (4 overs); Sunny Patel 2/14 (4 overs)		Sunny Patel 19 (25); Samarth Tiwari 6/5 (3 overs)

New England Eagles won by 43 runs
Glenville Cricket Complex, New York
Umpires: Ragupathy Venkatachalam and Saravanakumar Venkatesan
Player of the match: Samarth Tiwari (NEE)

- NJ Somerset Cavaliers won the toss and elected to bowl

August 13, 2023
9:45 AM (EST)
Scorecard

NJ Somerset Cavaliers; 99/8 (20 overs)	v	Empire State Titans; 66/6 (11.5 overs)
Xavier Marshall 36 (41); Shan Tennakoon 3/11 (3 overs)		Javon Searles 20 (23); Saad Bin Zafar 2/4 (3 overs)

Empire State Titans won by 4 wickets (with 1 ball remaining, D/L)
Glenville Cricket Complex, New York
Umpires: Jatin Karvir and Ragupathy Venkatachalam
Player of the match: Shan Tennakoon (EST)

- NJ Somerset Cavaliers won the toss and elected to bat
- Revised target of 66 in 12 overs

August 13, 2023
2:00 PM (EST)
Scorecard

New Jersey Stallions; 127/5 (20 overs)	v	New England Eagles; 114/9 (20 overs)
Bhaskar Yadram 39 (28); Gourav Grover 4/16 (4 overs)		Akshay Homraj 22 (30); Derone Davis 3/16 (4 overs)

New Jersey Stallions won by 13 runs
Glenville Cricket Complex, New York
Umpires: Mangesh Rane and Jatin Karvir
Player of the match: Derone Davis (NJS)

- New England Eagles won the toss and elected to bowl

August 14, 2023
9:45 AM (EST)
Scorecard

Empire State Titans; 124/6 (20 overs)	v	New Jersey Stallions; 126/6 (19.1 overs)
Kwame Patton Jr. 52 (37); Jasdeep Singh 2/14 (4 overs)		Derone Davis 36 (23); Javon Searles 3/25 (4 overs)

New Jersey Stallions won by 4 wickets (with 5 balls remaining)
Glenville Cricket Complex, New York
Umpires: Jatin Karvir and Saravanakumar Venkatesan
Player of the match: Jasdeep Singh (NJS)

- New Jersey Stallions won the toss and elected to bowl

August 18, 2023
9:45 AM (EST)
Scorecard

The Philadelphians; 116/7 (20 overs)	v	Manhattan Yorkers; 87/7 (20 overs)
Jonathan Foo 42* (32); Chintan Patel 3/18 (4 overs)		Manoj Acharya 34 (16); Deveshwari Prashad 2/11 (4 overs)

The Philadelphians won by 29 runs
Mercer County Park, New Jersey
Umpires: Mihir Patel and Erfanullah Syed
Player of the match: Jonathan Foo (TP)

- Manhattan Yorkers won the toss and elected to bowl

August 19, 2023
10:30 AM (EST)
Scorecard

NJ Somerset Cavaliers; 81/9 (20 overs)	v	New Jersey Stallions; 85/5 (17.4 overs)
Sunny Patel 22 (8); Stephen Wiig 3/14 (4 overs)		Dominique Rikhi 21 (29); Saad Bin Zafar 3/4 (4 overs)

New Jersey Stallions won by 5 wickets (with 14 balls remaining)
Mercer County Park, New Jersey
Umpires: Mihir Patel and Dimpal Patel
Player of the match: Saad Bin Zafar (NJS)

- New Jersey Stallions won the toss and elected to bowl

August 19, 2023
2:30 PM (EST)
Scorecard

The Philadelphians; 51 (16.1 overs)	v	Manhattan Yorkers; 38 (15.2 overs)
Jonathan Foo 25 (35); Nisarg Desai 3/10 (4 overs)		Arslan Khan 9 (16); Jonathan Foo 4/1 (3 overs)

The Philadelphians won by 29 runs
Mercer County Park, New Jersey
Umpires: Mihir Patel and Deepak Katte
Player of the match: Jonathan Foo (TP)

- The Philadelphians won the toss and elected to bat

August 20, 2023
10:30 AM (EST)
Scorecard

NJ Somerset Cavaliers; 124/6 (20 overs)	v	New Jersey Stallions; 116/6 (20 overs)
Yasir Mohammad 24 (24); Siddarth Matani 2/10 (4 overs)		Dominique Rikhi 46 (34); Karima Gore 1/10 (4 overs)

NJ Somerset Cavaliers won by 8 runs
Mercer County Park, New Jersey
Umpires: Colin Edwards and Mihir Patel
Player of the match: Karima Gore (NJSC)

- New Jersey Stallions won the toss and elected to bowl

August 25, 2023
2:00 PM (EST)
Scorecard

New England Eagles; 93 (18 overs)	v	NJ Somerset Cavaliers; 90 (17.5 overs)
Apurva Maheshram 26 (34); Sunny Patel 4/25 (4 overs)		Karima Gore 28 (25); Hemendra Ramdihal 5/10 (3.5 overs)

New England Eagles won by 3 runs
Glenville Cricket Complex, New York
Umpires: Saravanakumar Venkatesan and Sundaresh R Iyer
Player of the match: Apurva Maheshram (NEE)

- NJ Somerset Cavaliers won the toss and elected to bowl

August 26, 2023
10:30 AM (EST)
Scorecard

New England Eagles; 106/4 (20 overs)	v	New Jersey Stallions; 107/5 (16.5 overs)
Apurva Maheshram 23 (28); Sachin Mylavarapu 1/11 (4 overs)		Derone Davis 39* (21); Salman Nazar 2/25 (3.5 overs)

New Jersey Stallions won by 5 wickets (with 19 balls remaining)
Glenville Cricket Complex, New York
Umpires: Jatin Karvir and Sundaresh R Iyer
Player of the match: Derone Davis (NJS)

- New England Eagles won the toss and elected to bat

August 26, 2023
2:30 PM (EST)
Scorecard

NJ Somerset Cavaliers; 124/8 (20 overs)	v	Empire State Titans; 115/8 (20 overs)
Sunny Patel 46 (45); Yannick Elliott 3/17 (4 overs)		Aman Patel 26 (24); Gajanand Singh 2/4 (2 overs)

NJ Somerset Cavaliers won by 9 runs
Glenville Cricket Complex, New York
Umpires: Saravanakumar Venkatesan and Jatin Karvir
Player of the match: Sunny Patel (NJSC)

- Empire State Titans won the toss and elected to bowl

August 27, 2023
10:30 AM (EST)
Scorecard

New Jersey Stallions; 148/5 (16 overs)	v	Empire State Titans; 102/6 (16 overs)
Derone Davis 50* (27); Javon Searles 2/16 (4 overs)		Nehal Tarimela 20 (18); Raymond Ramrattan 3/23 (3 overs)

New Jersey Stallions won by 46 runs (D/L)
Glenville Cricket Complex, New York
Umpires: Mangesh Rane and Ragupathy Venkatachalam
Player of the match: Derone Davis (NJS)

- Empire State Titans won the toss and elected to bowl
- Play reduced to 16 overs per side

September 1, 2023
10:15 AM (EST)
Scorecard

Empire State Titans; 156/5 (20 overs)	v	Manhattan Yorkers; 111/9 (20 overs)
Savan Patel 47 (33); Deep Joshi 2/13 (4 overs)		Nisarg Desai 25* (25); Aman Patel 3/18 (4 overs)

Empire State Titans won by 45 runs
Mercer County Park, New Jersey
Umpires: Colin Edwards and Bryan Caine
Player of the match: Aman Patel (EST)

- Empire State Titans won the toss and elected to bowl

September 2, 2023
10:15 AM (EST)
Scorecard

Empire State Titans; 107 (19 overs)	v	The Philadelphians; 108/2 (10.2 overs)
Savan Patel 22 (20); Soripul Islam 3/4 (2.3 overs)		Ryan Scott 58 (29); Nahid Sarkar 2/17 (3 overs)

The Philadelphians won by 8 wickets (with 58 balls remaining)
Hatfield Park, Pennsylvania
Umpires: Mihir Patel and Ratesh Patel
Player of the match: Ryan Scott (TP)

- The Philadelphians won the toss and elected to bowl

September 2, 2023
2:15 PM (EST)
Scorecard

The Philadelphians; 142/9 (20 overs)	v	New England Eagles; 123 (18.4 overs)
Jonathan Foo 40* (28); Christopher Barnwell 3/23 (4 overs)		Jaladh Dua 27 (32); Deveshwari Prashad 4/13 (3.4 overs)

The Philadelphians won by 19 runs
Hatfield Park, Pennsylvania
Umpires: Mihir Patel and Ritesh Patel
Player of the match: Deveshwari Prashad (TP)

- New England Eagles won the toss and elected to bowl

September 3, 2023
10:15 AM (EST)
Scorecard

New England Eagles; 64 (19.5 overs)	v	Manhattan Yorkers; 65/4 (17.2 overs)
Gourav Grover 18 (15); Ruchir Joshi 4/17 (3.5 overs)		Hiram Shallow 33* (35); Gourav Grover 1/3 (4 overs)

Manhattan Yorkers won by 6 wickets (with 16 balls remaining)
Mercer County Park, New Jersey
Umpires: Colin Edwards and Mihir Patel
Player of the match: Hiram Shallow (MY)

- New England Eagles won the toss and elected to bat

September 10, 2023
10:30 AM (EST)
Scorecard

Empire State Titans	v	The Philadelphians

Play abandoned
Mercer County Park, New Jersey
Umpires: Bryan Caine and Ritesh Patel

September 10, 2023
2:30 PM (EST)
Scorecard

Manhattan Yorkers	v	New England Eagles

Play abandoned
Mercer County Park, New Jersey
Umpires: Bryan Caine and Ivy Mahabir

September 11, 2023
10:00 AM (EST)
Scorecard

The Philadelphians; 63/8 (10 overs)	v	New England Eagles; 64/2 (8.5 overs)
Raj Nannan 31 (20); Gourav Grover 2/6 (2 overs)		Christopher Barnwell 29* (18); Raj Nannan 1/14 (2 overs)

New England Eagles won by 8 wickets (with 7 balls remaining)
Mercer County Park, New Jersey
Umpires: Erfanullah Syed and Deepak Katte
Player of the match: Christopher Barnwell (NEE)

- The Philadelphians won the toss and elected to bat
- Play reduced to 10 overs per side

September 11, 2023
2:30 PM (EST)
Scorecard

Empire State Titans; 128 (19.3 overs)	v	Manhattan Yorkers; 74 (17.1 overs)
Supreet Madaan 55 (29); Manoj Acharya 2/18 (3.3 overs)		Abhayjit Khangura 16 (15); Shan Tennakoon 3/12 (4 overs)

Empire State Titans won by 54 runs
Mercer County Park, New Jersey
Umpires: Deepak Katte and Dimpal Patel
Player of the match: Supreet Madaan (EST)

- Empire State Titans won the toss and elected to bat

September 16, 2023
10:15 AM (EST)
Scorecard

Manhattan Yorkers; 66/8 (20 overs)	v	NJ Somerset Cavaliers; 67/3 (16.4 overs)
Danesh Patel 12 (23); Karima Gore 4/10 (3.1 overs)		Sunny Patel 40* (43); Nisarg Desai 2/8 (4 overs)

NJ Somerset Cavaliers won by 7 wickets (with 20 balls remaining)
Mercer County Park, New Jersey
Umpires: Mihir Patel and Colin Edwards
Player of the match: Sunny Patel (NJSC)

- Manhattan Yorkers won the toss and elected to bat

September 16, 2023
2:15 PM (EST)
Scorecard

New Jersey Stallions; 111/9 (20 overs)	v	The Philadelphians; 112/4 (18.5 overs)
Bravish Shetty 31 (26); Soripul Islam 2/13 (4 overs)		Ryan Scott 31 (38); Sachin Mylavarapu 2/19 (4 overs)

The Philadelphians won by 6 wickets (with 7 balls remaining)
Mercer County Park, New Jersey
Umpires: Colin Edwards and Ritesh Patel
Player of the match: Jonathan Foo (TP)

- New Jersey Stallions won the toss and elected to bat

September 16, 2023
2:30 PM (EST)
Scorecard

Empire State Titans	v	New England Eagles

New England Eagles won by forfeit
Glenville Cricket Complex, New York
Umpires: Mangesh Rane and Jatin Karvir

September 17, 2023
10:15 AM (EST)
Scorecard

New Jersey Stallions; 128 (20 overs)	v	Manhattan Yorkers; 94/9 (20 overs)
Dominique Rikhi 43 (31); Dhruv Pawar 3/13 (4 overs)		Nisarg Desai 22* (15); Derone Davis 3/12 (4 overs)

New Jersey Stallions won by 34 runs
Mercer County Park, New Jersey
Umpires: Ivy Mahabir and Colin Edwards
Player of the match: Derone Davis (NJS)

- Manhattan Yorkers won the toss and elected to bowl

September 17, 2023
10:30 AM (EST)
Scorecard

New England Eagles	v	Empire State Titans

New England Eagles won by forfeit
Glenville Cricket Complex, New York
Umpires: Mangesh Rane and Jatin Karvir

September 17, 2023
2:15 PM (EST)
Scorecard

The Philadelphians; 86 (19 overs)	v	NJ Somerset Cavaliers; 87/3 (14.4 overs)
Deveshwari Prashad 31 (46); Sunny Patel 2/14 (4 overs)		Gajanand Singh 30* (35); Sivaram Swarna 1/10 (2 overs)

NJ Somerset Cavaliers won by 7 wickets (with 32 balls remaining)
Mercer County Park, New Jersey
Umpires: Colin Edwards and Mihir Patel
Player of the match: Karima Gore (NJSC)

- The Philadelphians won the toss and elected to bat

=== Pacific Conference ===
==== Central Division ====
Pos	Team	Pld	W	L	NR	Pts	NRR
1	Dallas Mustangs	10	8	2	0	16	1.395
2	Michigan Cricket Stars	10	6	3	1	13	0.987
3	Lone Star Athletics	10	5	4	1	11	0.185
4	Dallas Xforia Giants	10	5	4	1	11	−0.060
5	Chicago Kingsmen	10	4	3	3	11	0.369
6	Houston Hurricanes	10	4	6	0	8	−0.239
7	St. Louis Americans	10	2	7	1	5	−1.180
8	Chicago Tigers	10	2	7	1	5	−1.621

Updated to match(es) played on September 17, 2023. Source: Minor League Cricket
- Top three teams move on
- advances to Super 8s
- advances to Knockout stage
Division matches

August 4, 2023
2:00 PM (EST)
Scorecard

Chicago Kingsmen; 165/6 (20 overs)	v	Chicago Tigers; 170/5 (17.4 overs)
Hassan Khan 50* (26); Calvin Savage 3/32 (4 overs)		Cody Chetty 51* (44); Hassan Khan 2/23 (4 overs)

Chicago Tigers won by 5 wickets (with 14 balls remaining)
Tigers Park, Chicago
Umpires: Chirag Vaswani and Darpan Patel
Player of the match: Hassan Khan (CK)

- Chicago Kingsmen won the toss and elected to bat

August 5, 2023
11:00 AM (EST)
Scorecard

Chicago Kingsmen	v	Chicago Tigers

Play abandoned
Tigers Park, Chicago
Umpires: Mushir Laliwala and Matin Imamdar

- Chicago Kingsmen won the toss and elected to bat

August 11, 2023
11:00 AM (EST)
Scorecard

Dallas Mustangs; 148/7 (20 overs)	v	Houston Hurricanes; 148/7 (20 overs)
Hammad Azam 46 (31); Hassan Rashid 3/42 (4 overs)		Joshua Tromp 52 (38); Rushil Ugarkar 2/21 (4 overs)

Match tied (Dallas Mustangs won in the tie-breaker)
Prairie View Cricket Complex, Houston
Umpires: Myron James and Sadiq Khoja
Player of the match: Hammad Azam (DM)

- Dallas Mustangs won the toss and elected to bat
- Super Over: Mustangs 8/2, Hurricanes 10/0

August 12, 2023
10:00 AM (EST)
Scorecard

Lone Star Athletics; 186/2 (20 overs)	v	Dallas Mustangs; 176/7 (20 overs)
Shayan Jahangir 98* (58); Ali Sheikh 1/28 (3 overs)		Ali Sheikh 74 (42); Shubham Ranjane 3/43 (4 overs)

Lone Star Athletics won by 10 runs
Moosa Stadium, Houston
Umpires: Owen Brown and Altaf Mahesania
Player of the match: Shayan Jahangir (LSA)

- Dallas Mustangs won the toss and elected to bowl

August 12, 2023
1:00 PM (EST)
Scorecard

Dallas Xforia Giants; 165/8 (20 overs)	v	Houston Hurricanes; 167/2 (15.3 overs)
Udaybir Walia 44 (19); Usman Shinwari 2/28 (4 overs)		Joshua Tromp 78 (38); Harmeet Singh 1/43 (4 overs)

Houston Hurricanes won by 8 wickets (with 27 balls remaining)
Prairie View Cricket Complex, Houston
Umpires: Sadiq Khoja and Naveed Siddiqui
Player of the match: Joshua Tromp (HH)

- Houston Hurricanes won the toss and elected to bowl

August 12, 2023
2:00 PM (EST)
Scorecard

Michigan Cricket Stars; 110/5 (14 overs)	v	St. Louis Americans; 86/8 (14 overs)
Nicholas Kirton 53 (36); Ferisco Adams 2/26 (3 overs)		Ujjwal Vinnakota 25 (13); Akhil Kumar 3/16 (3 overs); Mohammad Mohsin 3/16 (3 overs)

Michigan Cricket Stars won by 14 runs (DLS)
ACAC Park, St. Louis
Umpires: Srinivas Chirra and Sandeep Pathuri
Player of the match: Nicholas Kirton (MCS)

- Michigan Cricket Stars won the toss and elected to bat
- Play reduced to 14 overs per side.

August 13, 2023
10:00 AM (EST)
Scorecard

Lone Star Athletics; 142/7 (20 overs)	v	Dallas Xforia Giants; 114 (18.4 overs)
Nitish Kumar 44 (33); Harmeet Singh 1/15 (4 overs)		Chaitanya Bishnoi 41 (34); Pawan Suyal 4/15 (3.4 overs)

Lone Star Athletics won by 28 runs
Moosa Stadium, Houston
Umpires: Cameron Best and Owen Brown
Player of the match: Pawan Suyal (LSA)

- Dallas Xforia Giants won the toss and elected to bowl

August 13, 2023
10:30 AM (EST)
Scorecard

Michigan Cricket Stars; 153/7 (20 overs)	v	St. Louis Americans; 156/4 (19 overs)
Nicholas Kirton 39 (36); Abhimanyu Lamba 2/23 (4 overs)		Justin Dill 54 (38); Zeeshan Maqsood 1/20 (3 overs)

St. Louis Americans won by 6 wickets (with 6 balls remaining)
ACAC Park, St. Louis
Umpires: Srinivas Chirra and Farhan Bobat
Player of the match: Justin Dill (SLA)

- St. Louis Americans won the toss and elected to bowl

August 18, 2023
9:45 AM (EST)
Scorecard

Michigan Cricket Stars; 189/6 (20 overs)	v	Chicago Tigers; 79 (15.2 overs)
Zeeshan Maqsood 44 (32); Shiv Shani 2/23 (4 overs)		Mittansh Nithiyanandam 21 (23); Praveen Kumar 3/24 (4 overs)

Michigan Cricket Stars won by 110 runs
Tigers Park, Chicago
Umpires: Chirag Vaswani and Mushir Laliwala
Player of the match: Zeeshan Maqsood (MCS)

- Chicago Tigers won the toss and elected to bowl

August 19, 2023
10:00 AM (EST)
Scorecard

Chicago Tigers; 163/5 (20 overs)	v	Michigan Cricket Stars; 165/3 (19.2 overs)
Pruthvish Patel 86 (52); Praveen Kumar 4/17 (4 overs)		Nicholas Kirton 77* (58); Pruthvish Patel 1/26 (4 overs)

Michigan Cricket Stars won by 7 wickets (with 4 balls remaining)
Tigers Park, Chicago
Umpires: Ameya Radkar and Darpan Patel
Player of the match: Nicholas Kirton (MCS)

- Chicago Tigers won the toss and elected to bat

August 19, 2023
3:00 PM (EST)
Scorecard

St. Louis Americans; 130/8 (20 overs)	v	Chicago Kingsmen; 131/4 (19.2 overs)
Justin Dill 61 (42); Mir Hamza 4/20 (4 overs)		Hassan Khan 45* (23); Justin Dill 1/22 (4 overs)

Chicago Kingsmen won by 6 wickets (with 4 balls remaining)
Tigers Park, Chicago
Umpires: Matin Inamdar and Karthik Raghupathy
Player of the match: Hassan Khan (CK)

- Chicago Kingsmen won the toss and elected to bowl

August 20, 2023
11:00 AM (EST)
Scorecard

St. Louis Americans; 61 (20 overs)	v	Chicago Kingsmen; 67/3 (10 overs)
Kranthi Kumar 11 (19); Mir Hamza 4/15 (4 overs)		Asif Mehmood 24* (16); Justin Dill 1/7 (3 overs)

Chicago Kingsmen won by 7 wickets (with 60 balls remaining)
Tigers Park, Chicago
Umpires: Darpan Patel and Karthik Raghupathy
Player of the match: Mir Hamza (CK)

- Chicago Kingsmen won the toss and elected to bowl

September 1, 2023
9:45 AM (EST)
Scorecard

Chicago Tigers; 105/7 (20 overs)	v	Lone Star Athletics; 106/2 (13.3 overs)
Kumar Subramanian 35 (35); Amir Hamza 2/13 (4 overs); Shubham Ranjane 2/13 (4 overs)		Milind Kumar 47* (32); Calvin Savage 1/16 (3 overs)

Lone Star Athletics won by 8 wickets (with 39 balls remaining)
Moosa Stadium, Texas
Umpires: Myron James and Sadiq Khoja
Player of the match: Shubham Ranjane (LSA)

- Lone Star Athletics won the toss and elected to bowl

September 1, 2023
10:00 AM (EST)
Scorecard

Chicago Kingsmen; 152/6 (20 overs)	v	Houston Hurricanes; 142 (20 overs)
Hassan Khan 54* (28); Usman Shinwari 2/25 (4 overs)		Mukhtar Ahmed 80 (57); Haseeb Azam 4/33 (4 overs)

Chicago Kingsmen won by 10 runs
Prairie View Cricket Complex, Texas
Umpires: Rakesh Jain and Brian Walters
Player of the match: Hassan Khan (CK)

- Houston Hurricanes won the toss and elected to bowl

September 1, 2023
1:45 PM (EST)
Scorecard

Michigan Cricket Stars; 144/8 (20 overs)	v	Dallas Xforia Giants; 146/1 (16 overs)
Nicholas Kirton 38* (29); Praneeth Raj 2/16 (4 overs)		Smit Patel 67* (52); Mohammad Mohsin 1/19 (3 overs)

Dallas Xforia Giants won by 9 wickets (with 24 balls remaining)
Moosa Stadium, Texas
Umpires: Myron James and Sadiq Khoja
Player of the match: Aakarshit Gomel (CK)

- Michigan Cricket Stars won the toss and elected to bat

September 1, 2023
2:00 PM (EST)
Scorecard

Dallas Mustangs; 162/8 (20 overs)	v	St. Louis Americans; 103 (16.4 overs)
Andries Gous 55 (43); Gerhard Erasmus 3/17 (4 overs)		Kranthi Kumar 34 (34); Nosthush Kenjige 4/16 (3.3 overs)

Dallas Mustangs won by 59 runs
Prairie View Cricket Complex, Texas
Umpires: Rakesh Jain and Brian Walters
Player of the match: Andries Gous (DM)

- Dallas Mustangs won the toss and elected to bat

September 2, 2023
9:45 AM (EST)
Scorecard

Dallas Mustangs; 214/5 (20 overs)	v	Chicago Tigers; 146 (19.4 overs)
Corey Anderson 95 (35); Mittansh Nithiyanandam 2/17 (2 overs)		Cody Chetty 34 (27); Ali Sheikh 2/14 (4 overs)

Dallas Mustangs won by 68 runs
Moosa Stadium, Texas
Umpires: Sadiq Khoja and Altaf Mahesania
Player of the match: Corey Anderson (DM)

- Chicago Tigers won the toss and elected to bowl

September 2, 2023
1:45 PM (EST)
Scorecard

Lone Star Athletics; 119/9 (20 overs)	v	Michigan Cricket Stars; 124/4 (17 overs)
Shubham Ranjane 31 (38); Muhammad Kamal 4/24 (4 overs)		Zeeshan Maqsood 43 (31); Imran Khan 1/9 (2 overs)

Michigan Cricket Stars won by 6 wickets (with 18 balls remaining)
Moosa Stadium, Texas
Umpires: Sadiq Khoja and Cameron Best
Player of the match: Zeeshan Maqsood (MCS)

- Michigan Cricket Stars won the toss and elected to bowl

September 2, 2023
2:00 PM (EST)
Scorecard

Houston Hurricanes; 125/4 (12 overs)	v	St. Louis Americans; 111/5 (12 overs)
Saif Badar 46 (18); Sam Das 2/35 (3 overs)		Zahid Zakhail 59 (27); Hamza Bangash 3/16 (2 overs)

Houston Hurricanes won by 14 runs
Prairie View Cricket Complex, Texas
Umpires: Owen Brown and Myron James
Player of the match: Saif Badar (HH)

- St. Louis Americans won the toss and elected to bowl

September 3, 2023
9:45 AM (EST)
Scorecard

Dallas Mustangs; 165/5 (20 overs)	v	Chicago Kingsmen; 168/3 (16.3 overs)
Corey Anderson 78* (39); Haseeb Azam 2/32 (4 overs)		Tajinder Singh 80 (35); Hammad Azam 2/19 (3 overs)

Chicago Kingsmen won by 7 wickets (with 21 balls remaining)
Moosa Stadium, Texas
Umpires: Cameron Best and Altaf Mahesania
Player of the match: Tajinder Singh (CK)

- Chicago Kingsmen won the toss and elected to bowl

September 3, 2023
10:00 AM (EST)
Scorecard

Chicago Tigers; 118/9 (20 overs)	v	Dallas Xforia Giants; 120/3 (15.5 overs)
Jay Desai 60 (44); Harmeet Singh 3/13 (4 overs)		Aakarshit Gomel 44 (30); Tirth Patel 2/24 (4 overs)

Dallas Xforia Giants won by 7 wickets (with 25 balls remaining)
Prairie View Cricket Complex, Texas
Umpires: Myron James and Owen Brown
Player of the match: Chaitanya Bishnoi (DXG)

- Dallas Xforia Giants won the toss and elected to bowl

September 3, 2023
1:45 PM (EST)
Scorecard

Lone Star Athletics; 192/2 (20 overs)	v	St. Louis Americans; 123/4 (14 overs)
Nitish Kumar 81 (49); Sam Das 1/36 (4 overs); Angad Singh 1/27 (3 overs)		Kranthi Kumar 51 (34); Pawan Suyal 1/9 (2 overs)

Lone Star Athletics won by 24 runs (D/L)
Moosa Stadium, Texas
Umpires: Sadiq Khoja and Altaf Mahesania
Player of the match: Nitish Kumar (LSA)

- Lone Star Athletics won the toss and elected to bat

September 3, 2023
2:00 PM (EST)
Scorecard

Michigan Cricket Stars; 169/6 (20 overs)	v	Houston Hurricanes; 119 (18.3 overs)
Zeeshan Maqsood 48 (34); Hassan Rashid 2/23 (4 overs)		Saif Badar 38 (28); Zeeshan Maqsood 5/10 (4 overs)

Michigan Cricket Stars won by 50 runs
Prairie View Cricket Complex, Texas
Umpires: Owen Brown and Myron James
Player of the match: Zeeshan Maqsood (MCS)

- Houston Hurricanes won the toss and elected to bowl

September 4, 2023
9:45 AM (EST)
Scorecard

Dallas Xforia Giants; 26/1 (4.1 overs)	v	St. Louis Americans
Zahid Zakhail 18* (13); Udaybir Walia 0/3 (1 over)

Play abandoned
Moosa Stadium, Texas
Umpires: Cameron Best and Sadiq Khoja

- St. Louis Americans won the toss and elected to bat

September 4, 2023
10:00 AM (EST)
Scorecard

Dallas Mustangs; 155/5 (20 overs)	v	Michigan Cricket Stars; 108 (15.4 overs)
Corey Anderson 83* (54); Muhammad Kamal 2/38 (4 overs)		Nicholas Kirton 40 (25); Nauman Anwar 2/13 (2.4 overs)

Dallas Mustangs won by 47 runs
Prairie View Cricket Complex, Texas
Umpires: Owen Brown and Naveed Siddiqui
Player of the match: Corey Anderson (DM)

- Michigan Cricket Stars won the toss and elected to bowl

September 4, 2023
1:30 PM (EST)
Scorecard

Houston Hurricanes; 178/2 (20 overs)	v	Chicago Tigers; 154/7 (20 overs)
Joshua Tromp 64* (47); Tirth Patel 1/35 (4 overs)		Cody Chetty 61 (38); Usman Shinwari 3/24 (4 overs)

Houston Hurricanes won by 24 runs
Prairie View Cricket Complex, Texas
Umpires: Owen Brown and Myron James
Player of the match: Joshua Tromp (HH)

- Chicago Tigers won the toss and elected to bowl

September 4, 2023
1:45 PM (EST)
Scorecard

Chicago Kingsmen	v	Lone Star Athletics

Play abandoned
Moosa Stadium, Texas
Umpires: Altaf Mahesania and Cameron Best

- Chicago Kingsmen won the toss and elected to bat

September 6, 2023
7:30 PM (EST)
Scorecard

Chicago Kingsmen; 161/6 (20 overs)	v	Dallas Xforia Giants; 166/5 (18.3 overs)
Hassan Khan 60 (32); Jaskaran Singh 3/41 (4 overs)		Aakarshit Gomel 75 (41); Hassan Khan 3/30 (4 overs)

Dallas Xforia Giants won by 5 wickets (with 9 balls remaining)
Grand Prairie Stadium, Texas
Umpires: Sameer Bandekar and Partha Pattanaik
Player of the match: Aakarshit Gomel (DXG)

- Dallas Xforia Giants won the toss and elected to bowl

September 8, 2023
7:30 PM (EST)
Scorecard

Houston Hurricanes; 163/4 (20 overs)	v	Dallas Xforia Giants; 87/3 (11 overs)
Matthew Tromp 37* (19); Harmeet Singh 1/22 (4 overs)		Aakarshit Gomel 26 (26); Usman Rafiq 1/10 (2 overs); Karthik Gattepalli 1/15 (3 overs)

Dallas Xforia Giants won by 7 wickets (D/L)
Grand Prairie Stadium, Texas
Umpires: Partha Pattanaik and Karthick Nachimuthu
Player of the match: Aakarshit Gomel (DXG)

- Dallas Xforia Giants won the toss and elected to bowl
- Revised target of 84

September 9, 2023
12:30 PM (EST)
Scorecard

Houston Hurricanes; 126/7 (20 overs)	v	Dallas Mustangs; 127/2 (14.4 overs)
Mukhtar Ahmed 46 (46); Nosthush Kenjige 3/26 (4 overs)		Nauman Anwar 64 (44); Karthik Gattepalli 1/24 (4 overs)

Dallas Mustangs won by 8 wickets (with 32 balls remaining)
Grand Prairie Stadium, Texas
Umpires: Sameer Bandekar and Partha Pattanaik
Player of the match: Nauman Anwar (DM)

- Dallas Mustangs won the toss and elected to bowl

September 9, 2023
1:30 PM (EST)
Scorecard

St. Louis Americans; 166/9 (20 overs)	v	Chicago Tigers; 130 (19.2 overs)
Angad Singh 41 (17); Calvin Savage 3/26 (4 overs)		Calvin Savage 43 (29); Angad Singh 4/18 (4 overs)

St. Louis Americans won by 36 runs
ACAC Park, Missouri
Umpires: Srinivas Chirra and Sandeep Pathuri
Player of the match: Angad Singh (SLA)

- St. Louis Americans won the toss and elected to bat

September 9, 2023
7:30 PM (EST)
Scorecard

Dallas Xforia Giants; 168/3 (20 overs)	v	Lone Star Athletics; 147/8 (20 overs)
Aakarshit Gomel 64* (38); Sidhesh Pathare 1/9 (2 overs)		Nitish Kumar 57 (44); Harmeet Singh 2/19 (4 overs)

Dallas Xforia Giants won by 21 runs
Grand Prairie Stadium, Texas
Umpires: Vishnu Pillai and Sameer Bandekar
Player of the match: Harmeet Singh (DXG)

- Lone Star Athletics won the toss and elected to bowl

September 10, 2023
10:00 AM (EST)
Scorecard

Chicago Tigers; 128/6 (20 overs	v	St. Louis Americans; 103 (16.4 overs)
Mittansh Nithiyanandam 51 (44); Sam Das 2/31 (4 overs)		Zahid Zakhail 28 (15); Mohit Patel 2/15 (4 overs)

Chicago Tigers won by 25 runs
ACAC Park, Missouri
Umpires: Srinivas Chirra and Ajoy Lal
Player of the match: Mittansh Nithiyanandam (CT)

- Chicago Tigers won the toss and elected to bat

September 10, 2023
12:30 PM (EST)
Scorecard

Dallas Mustangs; 167/7 (20 overs)	v	Lone Star Athletics; 126/7 (20 overs)
Corey Anderson 69 (29); Pawan Suyal 3/19 (4 overs)		Shubham Ranjane 58* (34); Rushil Ugarkar 2/41 (4 overs)

Dallas Mustangs won by 41 runs
Grand Prairie Stadium, Texas
Umpires: Sameer Bandekar and Partha Pattanaik
Player of the match: Corey Anderson (DM)

- Lone Star Athletics won the toss and elected to bowl

September 15, 2023
7:30 PM (EST)
Scorecard

Dallas Mustangs; 222/3 (20 overs)	v	Dallas Xforia Giants; 179/8 (20 overs)
Andries Gous 91 (52); Udaybir Walia 1/28 (3 overs)		Smit Patel 62 (40); Rumman Raees 2/24 (4 overs)

Dallas Mustangs won by 43 runs
Grand Prairie Stadium, Texas
Umpires: Sameer Bandekar and Partha Pattanaik
Player of the match: Andries Gous (DM)

- Dallas Xforia Giants won the toss and elected to bowl

September 16, 2023
2:00 PM (EST)
Scorecard

Michigan Cricket Stars; 146/6 (20 overs)	v	Chicago Kingsmen; 108 (19.2 overs)
Waqas Saleem 40 (30); Hassan Khan 2/15 (4 overs)		Ravi Bopara 33 (37); Zeeshan Maqsood 3/5 (1.2 overs)

Michigan Cricket Stars won by 38 runs
Tigers Park, Chicago
Umpires: Matin Inamdar and Onkar Akolkar
Player of the match: Zeeshan Maqsood (MCS)

- Chicago Kingsmen won the toss and elected to bowl

September 16, 2023
2:15 PM (EST)
Scorecard

Houston Hurricanes; 146/5 (20 overs)	v	Lone Star Athletics; 139/9 (20 overs)
Mukhtar Ahmed 46 (39); Imran Khan 2/17 (4 overs)		Milind Kumar 60 (39); Usman Rafiq 4/22 (3 overs)

Houston Hurricanes won by 7 runs
Moosa Stadium, Texas
Umpires: Owen Brown and Altaf Mahesania
Player of the match: Usman Rafiq (HH)

- Houston Hurricanes won the toss and elected to bat

September 16, 2023
7:15 PM (EST)
Scorecard

Dallas Xforia Giants; 123/9 (20 overs)	v	Dallas Mustangs; 124/5 (18.4 overs)
Jaskaran Singh 55 (32); Ehsan Adil 2/12 (3.5 overs)		Nauman Anwar 35 (32); Akhilesh Bodugum 2/29 (4 overs)

Dallas Mustangs won by 5 wickets (with 8 balls remaining)
Grand Prairie Stadium, Texas
Umpires: Sameer Bandekar and Vishnu Pillai
Player of the match: Nauman Anwar (DM)

- Dallas Mustangs won the toss and elected to bowl

September 17, 2023
10:00 AM (EST)
Scorecard

Chicago Kingsmen	v	Michigan Cricket Stars

Play abandoned
Tigers Park, Chicago
Umpires: Mushir Laliwala and Chirag Vaswani

- Chicago Kingsmen won the toss and elected to bowl

September 17, 2023
11:00 AM (EST)
Scorecard

Houston Hurricanes; 130/7 (20 overs)	v	Lone Star Athletics; 131/2 (17.5 overs)
Joshua Tromp 58 (52); Shubham Ranjane 3/14 (4 overs)		Nitish Kumar 39 (43); Karthik Gattepalli 1/17 (4 overs)

Lone Star Athletics won by 8 wickets (with 13 balls remaining)
Prairie View Cricket Complex, Texas
Umpires: Owen Brown and Sadiq Khoja
Player of the match: Shubham Ranjane (LSA)

- Lone Star Athletics won the toss and elected to bowl

==== Western Division ====
Pos	Team	Pld	W	L	NR	Pts	NRR
1	Bay Blazers	10	8	1	1	17	0.852
2	Silicon Valley Strikers	10	6	3	1	13	0.301
3	Golden State Grizzlies	10	4	6	0	8	0.090
4	Seattle Thunderbolts	10	4	6	0	8	−0.012
5	SoCal Lashings	10	4	6	0	8	−0.370
6	San Diego Surf Riders	10	3	7	0	6	−0.755

Updated to match(es) played on September 18, 2023. Source: Minor League Cricket
- Top three teams move on
- advances to Super 8s
- advances to Knockout stage
Division matches

August 4, 2023
12:00 PM (PST)
Scorecard

SoCal Lashings; 134/8 (20 overs)	v	San Diego Surf Riders; 124/8 (20 overs)
Abhimanyu Rajp 39* (18); Adnesh Tondale 2/16 (4 overs)		Marty Kain 46 (37); Abhimanyu Rajp 4/24 (4 overs)

SoCal Lashings won by 10 runs
Leo Magnus Cricket Complex, California
Umpires: Ashwin Shah and Pankaj Chuadhari
Player of the match: Abhimanyu Rajp (SCL)

- San Diego Surf Riders won the toss and elected to bowl

August 5, 2023
2:00 PM (PST)
Scorecard

Bay Blazers; 159/5 (20 overs)	v	SoCal Lashings; 152/7 (20 overs)
David White 68 (52); Mrunal Patel 1/25 (4 overs)		Ruben Clinton 45 (36); Mohammad Katawazai 2/24 (4 overs)

Bay Blazers won by 7 runs
Leo Magnus Cricket Complex, California
Umpires: Azzam Haider and Pravin David
Player of the match: David White (EBB)

- Bay Blazers won the toss and elected to bat

August 6, 2023
10:30 AM (PST)
Scorecard

Bay Blazers; 152/9 (20 overs)	v	San Diego Surf Riders; 127/8 (20 overs)
Vikash Mohan 37 (29); Muditha Fernando 4/21 (4 overs)		Chad Breetzke 32 (18); Musadiq Ahmed 3/11 (3 overs)

Bay Blazers won by 25 runs
Leo Magnus Cricket Complex, California
Umpires: Pankaj Chaudhari and Bandula Hettiarachchi
Player of the match: Musadiq Ahmed (EBB)

- San Diego Surf Riders won the toss and elected to bowl

August 6, 2023
3:00 PM (PST)
Scorecard

SoCal Lashings; 144/7 (20 overs)	v	Silicon Valley Strikers; 123/9 (20 overs)
Ruben Clinton 64 (55); Saurabh Netravalkar 2/19 (4 overs)		Shehan Jayasuriya 55 (38); Ayan Desai 2/15 (4 overs)

SoCal Lashings won by 21 runs
Leo Magnus Cricket Complex, California
Umpires: Daniel Meredith and Pankaj Chuadhari
Player of the match: Ruben Clinton (SCL)

- SoCal Lashings won the toss and elected to bat

August 7, 2023
10:30 AM (PST)
Scorecard

Silicon Valley Strikers; 174/7 (20 overs)	v	San Diego Surf Riders; 119 (19.3 overs)
Lahiru Milantha 71 (44); Muditha Fernando 4/21 (4 overs)		Nisarg Patel 29 (29); Srinivas Raghavan 3/26 (4 overs)

Silicon Valley Strikers won by 55 runs
Leo Magnus Cricket Complex, California
Umpires: Daniel Meredith and Ashwin Shah
Player of the match: Lahiru Milantha (SVS)

- Silicon Valley Strikers won the toss and elected to bat

August 12, 2023
2:30 PM (PST)
Scorecard

Seattle Thunderbolts; 131/6 (20 overs)	v	Silicon Valley Strikers; 82 (14.4 overs)
Mehdi Hasan 40* (34); Shehan Jayasuriya 3/11 (4 overs)		Pranay Suri 21 (13); Rahul Nama 3/19 (3.4 overs)

Seattle Thunderbolts won by 49 runs
Tollgate Farm Park, Washington
Umpires: Anthony Bonthu and Damodhar Bhat
Player of the match: Mehdi Hasan (ST)

- Seattle Thunderbolts won the toss and elected to bat

August 13, 2023
10:45 AM (PST)
Scorecard

Seattle Thunderbolts; 105 (18.2 overs)	v	Silicon Valley Strikers; 106/7 (18.2 overs)
Ian Dev Singh 46 (27); Shehan Jayasuriya 3/11 (4 overs)		Shehan Jayasuriya 48 (41); Rahul Nama 4/17 (4 overs)

Silicon Valley Strikers won by 3 wickets (with 10 balls remaining)
Tollgate Farm Park, Washington
Umpires: Damodhar Bhat
Player of the match: Shehan Jayasuriya (SVS)

- Seattle Thunderbolts won the toss and elected to bat

August 13, 2023
1:00 PM (PST)
Scorecard

Bay Blazers; 179/4 (20 overs)	v	Golden State Grizzlies; 160/8 (20 overs)
Sanjay Krishnamurthi 84 (52); Vatsal Vaghela 2/35 (3 overs)		Anthony Bramble 73 (42); Abhishek Paradkar 3/26 (4 overs)

Bay Blazers won by 19 runs
Arroyo Park, California
Umpires: Ravishankar Byrappagowda and Sundaram Subramanian
Player of the match: Sanjay Krishnamurthi (BB)

- Bay Blazers won the toss and elected to bat

August 19, 2023
11:00 AM (PST)
Scorecard

Golden State Grizzlies; 138/8 (20 overs)	v	Silicon Valley Strikers; 139/4 (18.2 overs)
Kakani Harish 34 (27); Saurabh Netravalkar 4/11 (4 overs)		Lahiru Milantha 63 (47); Vatsal Vaghela 2/2 (1 over)

Silicon Valley Strikers won by 6 wickets (with 10 balls remaining)
Arroyo Park, California
Umpires: Ravishankar Byrappagowda and Sundaram Subramanian
Player of the match: Lahiru Milantha (SVS)

- Golden State Grizzlies won the toss and elected to bat

August 20, 2023
11:00 AM (PST)
Scorecard

Golden State Grizzlies; 131/9 (20 overs)	v	Silicon Valley Strikers; 132/5 (20 overs)
Kakani Harish 22 (27); Srinivas Raghavan 4/32 (4 overs)		Rahul Jariwala 37 (32); Neeraj Goel 2/20 (4 overs)

Silicon Valley Strikers won by 5 wickets
Arroyo Park, California
Umpires: Shailendra Raj and Ravishankar Byrappagowda
Player of the match: Srinivas Raghavan (SVS)

- Silicon Valley Strikers won the toss and elected to bowl

August 25, 2023
3:00 PM (PST)
Scorecard

San Diego Surf Riders; 118/7 (20 overs)	v	SoCal Lashings; 119/5 (19.2 overs)
Adit Gorawara 37 (30); Ayan Desai 2/22 (4 overs)		Kirstan Kallicharan 43 (41); Muditha Fernando 2/24 (4 overs)

SoCal Lashings won by 5 wickets (with 4 balls remaining)
Leo Magnus Cricket Complex, California
Umpires: Ashwin Shah and Piyush Agram
Player of the match: Kirstan Kallicharan (SCL)

- San Diego Surf Riders won the toss and elected to bat

August 26, 2023
11:00 AM (PST)
Scorecard

Golden State Grizzlies; 150/8 (20 overs)	v	SoCal Lashings; 136/8 (20 overs)
Anthony Bramble 78 (52); Elmore Hutchinson 2/32 (4 overs)		Kirstan Kallicharan 44 (38); Vatsal Vaghela 3/20 (4 overs)

Golden State Grizzlies won by 14 runs
Leo Magnus Cricket Complex, California
Umpires: Piyush Agram and Pravin David
Player of the match: Anthony Bramble (GSG)

- SoCal Lashings won the toss and elected to bowl

August 26, 2023
3:00 PM (PST)
Scorecard

Seattle Thunderbolts; 135/8 (20 overs)	v	Bay Blazers; 125/9 (20 overs)
Shadley van Schalkwyk 35 (33); Sanjay Krishnamurthi 2/16 (4 overs)		Adithya Ganesh 51 (43); Siva Kumar 4/18 (4 overs)

Seattle Thunderbolts won by 10 runs
Tollgate Farm Park, Seattle
Umpires: Anthony Bonthu and Damodhar Bhat
Player of the match: Siva Kumar (ST)

- Seattle Thunderbolts won the toss and elected to bat

August 27, 2023
10:45 AM (PST)
Scorecard

Seattle Thunderbolts; 144/7 (20 overs)	v	Bay Blazers; 146/6 (20 overs)
Shadley van Schalkwyk 42 (33); Sanjay Krishnamurthi 3/17 (4 overs)		Adithya Ganesh 37 (30); Shadley van Schalkwyk 2/30 (4 overs)

Bay Blazers won by 4 wickets
Tollgate Farm Park, Seattle
Umpires: Anthony Bonthu and Damodhar Bhat
Player of the match: Sanjay Krishnamurthi (BB)

- Seattle Thunderbolts won the toss and elected to bat

September 1, 2023
3:00 PM (PST)
Scorecard

San Diego Surf Riders; 127/7 (20 overs)	v	Seattle Thunderbolts; 121 (19.4 overs)
Greg Hay 52 (54); Rahul Nama 3/16 (4 overs)		Ian Chauhan 53 (35); Nikhil Dutta 4/19 (4 overs)

San Diego Surf Riders won by 6 runs
Canyonside Park, California
Umpires: Piyush Agram and Pravin David
Player of the match: Nikhil Dutta (SDSF)

- Seattle Thunderbolts won the toss and elected to bowl

September 2, 2023
3:00 PM (PST)
Scorecard

San Diego Surf Riders; 130/9 (20 overs)	v	Seattle Thunderbolts; 129/7 (20 overs)
Marty Kain 36 (22); Harsh Thaker 3/21 (4 overs)		Shadley van Schalkwyk 72* (52); Muditha Fernando 3/16 (4 overs)

San Diego Surf Riders won by 1 run
Canyonside Park, California
Umpires: Pankaj Chaudhari and Piyush Agram
Player of the match: Muditha Fernando (SDSF)

- Seattle Thunderbolts won the toss and elected to bowl

September 3, 2023
11:00 AM (PST)
Scorecard

Seattle Thunderbolts; 184/2 (20 overs)	v	SoCal Lashings; 156/9 (20 overs)
Dilpreet Bajwa 91 (57); Rubal Raina 2/39 (4 overs)		Mrunal Patel 55 (36); Harsh Thaker 3/14 (4 overs)

Seattle Thunderbolts won by 28 runs
Canyonside Park, California
Umpires: Pravin David and Daniel Meredith
Player of the match: Dilpreet Bajwa (ST)

- Seattle Thunderbolts won the toss and elected to bat

September 3, 2023
3:00 PM (PST)
Scorecard

San Diego Surf Riders; 133/7 (20 overs)	v	Golden State Grizzlies; 137/5 (19.1 overs)
Nikhil Dutta 34 (24); Kakani Harish 3/15 (4 overs)		Sami Aslam 57* (45); Abhinay Reddy 2/23 (4 overs)

Golden State Grizzlies won by 5 wickets (with 5 balls remaining)
Canyonside Park, California
Umpires: Pravin David and Bandula Hettiarachchi
Player of the match: Sami Aslam (GSG)

- San Diego Surf Riders won the toss and elected to bat

September 4, 2023
11:00 AM (PST)
Scorecard

Seattle Thunderbolts; 144/5 (20 overs)	v	SoCal Lashings; 145/3 (16.3 overs)
Dilpreet Bajwa 38 (41); Elmore Hutchinson 3/28 (4 overs)		Kirstan Kallicharan 50 (45); Cinci Siegertsz 1/25 (3 overs)

SoCal Lashings won by 7 wickets (with 21 balls remaining)
Canyonside Park, California
Umpires: Daniel Meredith and Pankaj Chaudhari
Player of the match: Kirstan Kallicharan (SCL)

- Seattle Thunderbolts won the toss and elected to bat

September 9, 2023
10:15 AM (PST)
Scorecard

Bay Blazers; 157/6 (20 overs)	v	San Diego Surf Riders; 80/9 (20 overs)
David White 49 (42); Muditha Fernando 3/29 (4 overs)		Abhinay Reddy 28* (33); Angelo Perera 3/13 (4 overs)

Bay Blazers won by 77 runs
Morgan Hill Sports Complex, California
Umpires: Sundaram Subramanian and Ravishankar Byrappagowda
Player of the match: Saideep Ganesh (BB)

- Bay Blazers won the toss and elected to bat

September 9, 2023
2:15 PM (PST)
Scorecard

SoCal Lashings; 103/6 (20 overs)	v	Silicon Valley Strikers; 105/1 (13.3 overs)
Kirstan Kallicharan 27 (27); Pranay Suri 3/15 (4 overs)		Lahiru Milantha 71* (45); Ayan Desai 1/12 (3 overs)

Silicon Valley Strikers won by 9 wickets (with 39 balls remaining)
Morgan Hill Sports Complex, California
Umpires: Sundaram Subramanian and Pankaj Chaudhari
Player of the match: Pranay Suri (SVS)

- SoCal Lashings won the toss and elected to bat

September 10, 2023
10:15 AM (PST)
Scorecard

San Diego Surf Riders; 141/3 (20 overs)	v	Silicon Valley Strikers; 142/5 (19.3 overs)
Adit Gorawara 40* (26); Pranay Suri 2/29 (4 overs)		Ravindra Singh 38* (32); Muditha Fernando 2/29 (4 overs)

Silicon Valley Strikers won by 5 wickets (with 3 balls remaining)
Morgan Hill Sports Complex, California
Umpires: Sundaram Subramanian and Pankaj Chaudhari
Player of the match: Ravindra Singh (SVS)

- San Diego Surf Riders won the toss and elected to bat

September 10, 2023
2:15 PM (PST)
Scorecard

SoCal Lashings; 155/5 (20 overs)	v	Bay Blazers; 159/7 (20 overs)
Harpreet Singh 51 (37); Angelo Perera 3/18 (4 overs)		David White 42 (34); Ayan Desai 2/24 (4 overs)

Bay Blazers won by 3 wickets
Morgan Hill Sports Complex, California
Umpires: Pankaj Chaudhari and Ravishankar Byrappagowda
Player of the match: Angelo Perera (BB)

- SoCal Lashings won the toss and elected to bat

September 15, 2023
11:00 AM (PST)
Scorecard

Bay Blazers; 139/6 (20 overs)	v	Golden State Grizzlies; 117/8 (20 overs)
David White 28 (29); Vatsal Vaghela 3/32 (4 overs)		Shivam Mishra 43 (40); Carmi le Roux 3/16 (4 overs); Sanjay Krishnamurthi 3/16 (4 overs)

Bay Blazers won by 22 runs
Santa Clara Cricket Stadium, California
Umpires: Sundaram Subramanian and Ravishankar Byrappagowda
Player of the match: Carmi le Roux (BB)

- Bay Blazers won the toss and elected to bat

September 16, 2023
10:15 AM (PST)
Scorecard

Silicon Valley Strikers; 139/8 (20 overs)	v	Bay Blazers; 140/5 (19.1 overs)
Gary Graham 40 (32); Mohammad Katawazai 3/24 (4 overs)		Vikash Mohan 35* (28); Saurabh Netravalkar 1/25 (4 overs)

Bay Blazers won by 5 wickets (with 5 balls remaining)
Santa Clara Cricket Stadium, California
Umpires: Sundaram Subramanian and Shailendra Raj
Player of the match: Sanjay Krishnamurthi (BB)

- Bay Blazers won the toss and elected to bowl

September 16, 2023
2:15 PM (PST)
Scorecard

Seattle Thunderbolts; 108 (19.4 overs)	v	Golden State Grizzlies; 109/2 (12.4 overs)
Aaron Johnson 57 (46); Zia Shahzad 5/18 (4 overs)		Anthony Bramble 59 (36); Siva Kumar 1/20 (2.4 overs)

Golden State Grizzlies won by 8 wickets (with 46 balls remaining)
Santa Clara Cricket Stadium, California
Umpires: Shailendra Raj and Ravishankar Byrappagowda
Player of the match: Zia Shahzad (GSG)

- Seattle Thunderbolts won the toss and elected to bat

September 17, 2023
9:30 AM (PST)
Scorecard

Seattle Thunderbolts; 162/5 (20 overs)	v	Golden State Grizzlies; 154/5 (20 overs)
Aaron Johnson 52 (37); Kakani Harish 2/39 (4 overs)		Anthony Bramble 74 (50); Cinci Siegertsz 2/17 (4 overs)

Seattle Thunderbolts won by 8 runs
Santa Clara Cricket Stadium, California
Umpires: Sundaram Subramanian and Ravishankar Byrappagowda
Player of the match: Anthony Bramble (GSG)

- Golden State Grizzlies won the toss and elected to bowl

September 18, 2023
10:15 AM (PST)
Scorecard

Silicon Valley Strikers	v	Bay Blazers

Play abandoned
Santa Clara Cricket Stadium, California
Umpires: Sundaram Subramanian and Shailendra Raj

- Silicon Valley Strikers won the toss and elected to bat

== Playoffs ==
=== Knockouts ===
The knockout stage was played from September 23 to 25, 2023. It was played to determine the final 4 spots in the Super 8s. (Note: The Atlanta Lightning, the Philadelphians, the Dallas Mustangs, and the Bay Blazers automatically qualified for the Super 8s due to first-place finishes in their respective divisions.)

Team	Status
NJ Somerset Cavaliers	Qualified for Super 8s
Atlanta Fire	Qualified for Super 8s
Silicon Valley Strikers	Qualified for Super 8s
Lone Star Athletics	Qualified for Super 8s
New England Eagles	Eliminated
New Jersey Stallions	Eliminated
Ft. Lauderdale Lions	Eliminated
Michigan Cricket Stars	Eliminated
Dallas Xforia Giants	Eliminated
Golden State Grizzlies	Eliminated

==== Matches ====
September 22, 2023
1:30 PM (PST)
Scorecard

NJ Somerset Cavaliers; 139/7 (20 overs)	v	New England Eagles; 73 (17.2 overs)
Sunny Patel 35 (21); Burhan Saeed 2/19 (4 overs)		Gihan Senanayake 33 (33); Yasir Mohammad 3/11 (3 overs)

NJ Somerset Cavaliers won by 66 runs
Glenville Cricket Complex, New York
Umpires: Deepak Katte and Bryan Caine
Player of the match: Adil Bhatti (NJSC)

- New England Eagles won the toss and elected to bowl

September 23, 2023
10:15 AM (PST)
Scorecard

Golden State Grizzlies; 96 (19.3 overs)	v	Silicon Valley Strikers; 97/9 (20 overs)
Anthony Bramble 45 (38); Srinivas Raghavan 3/13 (4 overs)		Rahul Jariwala 25 (29); Zia Shahzad 3/14 (4 overs)

Silicon Valley Strikers won by 1 wicket
Santa Clara Cricket Stadium, California
Umpires: Sundaram Subramanian and Sunil Singh
Player of the match: Colin Archibald (SVS)

- Silicon Valley Strikers won the toss and elected to bowl
- The Silicon Valley Strikers qualified for the Super 8s as a result of this match.

September 23, 2023
10:30 AM (PST)
Scorecard

NJ Somerset Cavaliers; 119/7 (14 overs)	v	New Jersey Stallions; 119/9 (14 overs)
Kennar Lewis 65 (41); Stephen Wiig 3/10 (3 overs)		Bravish Shetty 29 (17); Abir Chippa 3/16 (3 overs)

NJ Somerset Cavaliers won in the Super Over tiebreaker by 2 wickets
Glenville Cricket Complex, New York
Umpires: Deepak Katte and Bryan Caine
Player of the match: Kennar Lewis (NJSC)

- New Jersey Stallions won the toss and elected to bowl
- Play reduced to 14 overs per side
- Super Over: 5/0 (NJS), 8/0 (NJSC)
- The NJ Somerset Cavaliers qualified for the Super 8s as a result of this match.

September 24, 2023
1:30 PM (PST)
Scorecard

Lone Star Athletics; 163/6 (20 overs)	v	Dallas Xforia Giants; 156/6 (20 overs)
Nitish Kumar 103* (55); Sankirth Bathula 2/28 (4 overs)		Aakarshit Gomel 59 (44); Milind Kumar 2/25 (4 overs)

Lone Star Athletics won by 7 runs
Moosa Stadium, Texas
Umpires: Owen Brown and Altaf Mahesania
Player of the match: Nitish Kumar (LSA)

- Lone Star Athletics won the toss and elected to bat

September 25, 2023
1:30 PM (PST)
Scorecard

Michigan Cricket Stars; 141/6 (20 overs)	v	Lone Star Athletics; 144/3 (17.5 overs)
Yuvraj Samra 38 (35); Shubham Ranjane 2/33 (4 overs)		Milind Kumar 72* (50); Muhammad Kamal 1/14 (2 overs)

Lone Star Athletics won by 7 wickets (with 13 balls remaining)
Moosa Stadium, Texas
Umpires: Sadiq Khoja and Myron James
Player of the match: Milind Kumar (LSA)

- Michigan Cricket Stars won the toss and elected to bat
- The Lone Star Athletics qualified for the Super 8s as a result of this match.

September 26, 2023
1:30 PM (PST)
Scorecard

Ft. Lauderdale Lions; 157/8 (20 overs)	v	Atlanta Fire; 148/7 (20 overs)
Lendl Simmons 45 (41); Kevin Stoute 2/26 (4 overs)		Ravendra Persaud 41 (19); Corné Dry 3/21 (4 overs)

Atlanta Fire won by 9 runs
Prairie View Cricket Complex, Texas
Umpires: Bryan Caine and Aditya Gajjar
Player of the match: Corné Dry (AF)

- Ft. Lauderdale Lions won the toss and elected to bowl
- The Atlanta Fire qualified for the Super 8s as a result of this match.

=== Super Eights ===
The Super 8s were played directly after the Knockout stage from September 27 to 29, 2023.

==== Atlantic Four ====
Pos	Team	Pld	W	L	NR	Pts	NRR
1	NJ Somerset Cavaliers	3	2	1	0	4	1.440
2	Atlanta Fire	3	2	1	0	4	0.233
3	The Philadelphians	3	1	2	0	2	−0.182
4	Atlanta Lightning	3	1	2	0	2	−0.980

Updated to match(es) played on September 30, 2023. Source: Minor League Cricket
- Atlantic champion moves on
- advances to Final
Atlantic 4 matches

September 27, 2023
2:00 PM (PST)
Scorecard

Atlanta Lightning; 126 (20 overs)	v	Atlanta Fire; 129/6 (17.5 overs)
Jesse Bootan 40 (32); Venukalyan Madireddy 4/32 (4 overs)		Obus Pienaar 44 (27); Phani Simhadri 2/11 (4 overs)

Atlanta Fire won by 4 wickets (with 13 balls remaining)
Prairie View Cricket Complex, Texas
Umpires: Colin Edwards and Sameer Bandekar
Player of the match: Obus Pienaar (AF)

- Atlanta Lightning won the toss and elected to bat

September 27, 2023
2:15 PM (PST)
Scorecard

The Philadelphians	v	NJ Somerset Cavaliers

The Philadelphians won by forfeit
Prairie View Cricket Complex, Texas
Umpires: Owen Brown and Aditya Gajjar

September 28, 2023
10:00 AM (PST)
Scorecard

Atlanta Lightning; 124/7 (20 overs)	v	NJ Somerset Cavaliers; 125/4 (14.3 overs)
Junaid Siddiqui 31 (24); Yasir Mohammad 3/27 (4 overs); Junaid Nadir 3/27 (4 overs)		Abdullah Syed 51 (38); Dexter Sween 2/24 (3 overs)

NJ Somerset Cavaliers won by 6 wickets (with 33 balls remaining)
Prairie View Cricket Complex, Texas
Umpires: Rushane Samuels and Sameer Bandekar
Player of the match: Yasir Mohammad (NJSC)

- NJ Somerset Cavaliers won the toss and elected to bowl

September 28, 2023
10:15 AM (PST)
Scorecard

The Philadelphians; 119 (20 overs)	v	Atlanta Fire; 120/6 (19.1 overs)
Raj Nannan 26 (38); Venukalyan Madireddy 3/26 (3 overs)		Steven Taylor 30 (24); Raj Nannan 2/19 (4 overs)

Atlanta Fire won by 4 wickets (with 5 balls remaining)
Prairie View Cricket Complex, Texas
Umpires: Billy Taylor (ENG) and Bryan Caine (USA)
Player of the match: Steven Taylor (AF)

- Atlanta Fire won the toss and elected to bowl

September 29, 2023
2:00 PM (PST)
Scorecard

NJ Somerset Cavaliers; 161/5 (20 overs)	v	Atlanta Fire; 150 (19.2 overs)
Gajanand Singh 72* (35); Ateendra Subramanian 2/38 (4 overs)		Obus Pienaar 41 (26); Junaid Nadir 4/22 (4 overs)

NJ Somerset Cavaliers won by 11 runs
Prairie View Cricket Complex, Texas
Umpires: Colin Edwards and Sameer Bandekar
Player of the match: Gajanand Singh (NJSC)

- NJ Somerset Cavaliers won the toss and elected to bat

September 29, 2023
2:15 PM (PST)
Scorecard

Atlanta Lightning; 128 (18.1 overs)	v	The Philadelphians; 127/9 (20 overs)
Cassius Burton 32 (28); Deveshwari Prashad 5/21 (3.1 overs)		Jonathan Foo 31 (24); Phani Simhadri 3/19 (4 overs)

Atlanta Lightning won by 1 run
Prairie View Cricket Complex, Texas
Umpires: Bryan Caine and Owen Brown
Player of the match: Deveshwari Prashad (TP)

- The Philadelphians won the toss and elected to bat

==== Pacific Four ====
Pos	Team	Pld	W	L	NR	Pts	NRR
1	Dallas Mustangs	3	3	0	0	6	2.261
2	Bay Blazers	3	2	1	0	4	0.017
3	Lone Star Athletics	3	1	2	0	2	−1.446
4	Silicon Valley Strikers	3	0	3	0	0	−0.825

Updated to match(es) played on September 30, 2023. Source: Minor League Cricket
- Pacific champion moves on
- advances to Final
Pacific 4 matches

September 27, 2023
10:00 AM (PST)
Scorecard

Dallas Mustangs; 182/4 (20 overs)	v	Lone Star Athletics; 110 (17.5 overs)
Sujith Gowda 70* (52); Hamza Khalid 2/31 (4 overs)		Shubham Ranjane 41 (32); Rushil Ugarkar 5/27 (3.5 overs)

Lone Star Athletics won by 72 runs
Prairie View Cricket Complex, Texas
Umpires: Billy Taylor (ENG) and Colin Edwards (USA)
Player of the match: Andries Gous (DM)

- Lone Star Athletics won the toss and elected to bowl

September 27, 2023
10:15 AM (PST)
Scorecard

Bay Blazers; 151/9 (20 overs)	v	Silicon Valley Strikers; 118 (19.3 overs)
David White 58 (32); Ishwarjot Sohi 3/23 (4 overs)		Ravindra Singh 33 (25); Rusty Theron 2/22 (4 overs)

Bay Blazers won by 33 runs
Prairie View Cricket Complex, Texas
Umpires: Owen Brown and Bryan Caine
Player of the match: David White (BB)

- Silicon Valley Strikers won the toss and elected to bowl

September 28, 2023
2:00 PM (PST)
Scorecard

Silicon Valley Strikers; 135/5 (20 overs)	v	Dallas Mustangs; 136/5 (18.4 overs)
Ravindra Singh 33* (30); Rushil Ugarkar 2/31 (4 overs)		Andries Gous 79* (51); Arsh Buch 2/32 (4 overs)

Dallas Mustangs won by 5 wickets (with 8 balls remaining)
Prairie View Cricket Complex, Texas
Umpires: Rushane Samuels and Colin Edwards
Player of the match: Andries Gous (DM)

- Silicon Valley Strikers won the toss and elected to bat

September 28, 2023
2:15 PM (PST)
Scorecard

Bay Blazers; 165/6 (20 overs)	v	Lone Star Athletics; 145 (19.5 overs)
Adithya Ganesh 59 (32); Pawan Suyal 2/34 (4 overs)		Shayan Jahangir 53 (39); Carmi le Roux 4/13 (4 overs)

Bay Blazers won by 20 runs
Prairie View Cricket Complex, Texas
Umpires: Billy Taylor (ENG) and Aditya Gajjar (USA)
Player of the match: Carmi le Roux (BB)

- Bay Blazers won the toss and elected to bat

September 29, 2023
10:00 AM (PST)
Scorecard

Silicon Valley Strikers; 147/8 (20 overs)	v	Lone Star Athletics; 150/8 (19.4 overs)
Shehan Jayasuriya 53 (37); Sidhesh Pathare 2/21 (4 overs)		Milind Kumar 67 (43); Shehan Jayasuriya 2/18 (3 overs); Pranay Suri 2/18 (3 overs)

Lone Star Athletics won by 2 wickets (with 2 balls remaining)
Prairie View Cricket Complex, Texas
Umpires: Aditya Gajjar and Colin Edwards
Player of the match: Milind Kumar (LSA)

- Silicon Valley Strikers won the toss and elected to bat

September 29, 2023
10:15 AM (PST)
Scorecard

Dallas Mustangs; 152/8 (20 overs)	v	Bay Blazers; 100 (15.4 overs)
Nauman Anwar 89 (61); Carmi le Roux 2/28 (4 overs); Rusty Theron 2/28 (4 overs)		CP Rizwan 31 (22); Rushil Ugarkar 3/63 (3 overs)

Dallas Mustangs won by 52 runs
Prairie View Cricket Complex, Texas
Umpires: Rushane Samuels and Bryan Caine
Player of the match: Nauman Anwar (DM)

- Bay Blazers won the toss and elected to bowl

=== Final ===
The finals were played on October 1, 2023, at Grand Prairie Stadium in Texas.

October 1, 2023
7:00 PM (PST)
Scorecard

Dallas Mustangs; 121/8 (20 overs)	v	NJ Somerset Cavaliers; 77 (18 overs)
Ali Sheikh 36 (25); Adil Bhatti 2/4 (4 overs)		Kennar Lewis 27 (18); Nosthush Kenjige 3/9 (4 overs)

Dallas Mustangs won by 44 runs
Grand Prairie Stadium, Texas
Umpires: Rushane Samuels (USA) and Billy Taylor (ENG)
Player of the match: Nosthush Kenjige (DM)

- Dallas Mustangs won the toss and elected to bat
- The Dallas Mustangs won the 2023 Minor League Cricket championship as a result of this match.

== Statistics ==
=== Most runs ===
Player	Team	Mat	Inns	Runs	Ave	SR	HS	100	50	4s	6s
Andries Gous	Dallas Mustangs	12	12	46.91	516	140.98	91	0	6	39	28
Nitish Kumar	Lone Star Athletics	14	14	36.46	474	132.40	103	1	3	37	24
Anthony Bramble	Golden State Grizzlies	11	11	36.73	404	142.76	78	0	4	26	26
Shayan Jahangir	Lone Star Athletics	14	14	30.23	393	120.92	98	0	3	43	12
Corey Anderson	Dallas Mustangs	8	8	75.20	376	187.06	95	0	4	22	34
Source: Minor League Cricket

=== Most wickets ===
Player	Team	Mat	Inns	Wkts	BBI	Avg	Econ	SR	4w	5w
Muditha Fernando	San Diego Surf Riders	10	10	25	4/21	8.84	6.00	8.00	2	0
Corné Dry	Atlanta Fire	13	13	25	5/18	12.08	6.36	11.4	0	1
Kevin Stoute	Ft. Lauderdale Lions	10	10	22	5/16	10.50	7.00	9.0	1	1
Srinivas Raghavan	Silicon Valley Strikers	13	13	21	4/32	14.10	5.79	14.6	1	0
Phani Simhadri	Atlanta Lightning	11	11	19	4/19	11.21	5.35	12.6	1	0
Source: Minor League Cricket

== See also ==
- 2023 Major League Cricket season
