= 2016 Caribbean Premier League squads =

This is a list of the squads of the teams that participated in the 2016 Caribbean Premier League.

== Barbados Tridents ==
No.	Player	Nat	Date of birth	Batting	Bowling style
	Kieron Pollard (c)	(Trinidad and Tobago)	12 May 1987 (aged 29)	Right	Right-arm medium
	Shoaib Malik	(Pakistan)	1 February 1982 (aged 34)	Right	Right-arm off break
	Ravi Rampaul	(Trinidad and Tobago)	15 October 1984 (aged 31)	Left	Right-arm fast-medium
	Navin Stewart	(Trinidad and Tobago)	13 June 1983 (aged 33)	Right	Right-arm fast-medium
	Akeal Hosein	(Trinidad and Tobago)	23 April 1993 (aged 23)	Left	Slow left-arm orthodox
	Ashley Nurse	(Barbados)	22 December 1988 (aged 27)	Right	Right-arm off break
	Robin Peterson	(South Africa)	4 August 1979 (aged 36)	Left	Slow left-arm orthodox
	Imran Khan	(Trinidad and Tobago)	6 July 1984 (aged 32)	Right	Right-arm Leg break
	Kyle Corbin	(Barbados)	15 May 1990 (aged 26)	Right
	Nicholas Pooran (wk)	(Trinidad and Tobago)	2 October 1995 (aged 20)	Left
	David Wiese	(South Africa)	18 May 1985 (aged 31)	Right	Right-arm medium-fast
	Raymon Reifer	(Barbados)	11 May 1991 (aged 25)	Left	Left-arm medium
	Kyle Hope	(Barbados)	20 November 1988 (aged 27)	Right	Right-arm off spin
	Steven Taylor	(United States)	9 November 1993 (aged 22)	Left	Right-arm off break
	AB de Villiers	(South Africa)	17 February 1984 (aged 32)	Right	Right-arm medium
	Wayne Parnell	(South Africa)	30 July 1989 (aged 26)	Left	Left-arm fast
	Jason Holder	(Barbados)	5 November 1991 (aged 24)	Right	Right-arm fast-medium
	Shamar Springer	(Barbados)	26 November 1997 (aged 18)	Right	Right-arm fast-medium

== Guyana Amazon Warriors ==
No.	Player	Nat	Date of birth	Batting	Bowling style
	Martin Guptill (c)	(New Zealand)	30 September 1986 (aged 29)	Right	Right-arm off break
	Christopher Barnwell	(Guyana)	6 January 1987 (aged 29)	Right	Right-arm medium-fast
	Veerasammy Permaul	(Guyana)	11 August 1989 (aged 26)	Right	Slow left-arm orthodox
	Assad Fudadin	(Guyana)	1 August 1985 (aged 30)	Left	Right-arm medium-fast
	Paul Wintz	(Guyana)	7 March 1986 (aged 30)	Right	Right-arm medium-fast
	Steven Jacobs	(Guyana)	7 March 1986 (aged 30)	Right	Right-arm medium-fast
	Dwayne Smith	(Barbados)	12 April 1983 (aged 33)	Right	Right-arm medium
	Rayad Emrit	(Trinidad and Tobago)	8 March 1981 (aged 35)	Right	Right-arm medium-fast
	Chris Lynn	(Australia)	10 April 1990 (aged 26)	Right	Slow left-arm orthodox
	Sohail Tanvir	(Pakistan)	12 December 1984 (aged 31)	Left	Left-arm medium-fast
	Orlando Peters	(Antigua and Barbuda)	10 May 1988 (aged 28)	Right	Right-arm medium
	Jason Mohammed	(Trinidad and Tobago)	23 September 1986 (aged 29)	Right	Right-arm off break
	Adam Zampa	(Australia)	31 March 1992 (aged 24)	Right	Right-arm Leg break
	Anthony Bramble (wk)	(Guyana)	11 December 1990 (aged 25)	Right
	Steven Katwaroo (wk)	(Trinidad and Tobago)	14 January 1993 (aged 23)	Right
	Ali Khan	(United States)	13 December 1990 (aged 25)	Right	Right-arm medium-fast
	Devendra Bishoo	(Guyana)	6 November 1985 (aged 30)	Left	Right-arm Leg break
	Shimron Hetmyer	(Guyana)	26 December 1996 (aged 19)	Left	Right-arm Leg break

== Jamaica Tallawahs ==
No.	Player	Nat	Date of birth	Batting	Bowling style
	Chris Gayle (c)	(Jamaica)	21 September 1979 (aged 36)	Left	Right-arm off break
	Andre Russell	(Jamaica)	29 April 1988 (aged 28)	Right	Right-arm fast
	Chadwick Walton (wk)	(Jamaica)	3 July 1985 (aged 31)	Right
	Nkrumah Bonner	(Jamaica)	23 January 1989 (aged 27)	Right	Leg break
	Garey Mathurin	(Saint Lucia)	23 September 1983 (aged 32)	Left	Slow left-arm orthodox
	Shakib Al Hasan	(Bangladesh)	24 March 1987 (aged 29)	Left	Slow left-arm orthodox
	Lasith Malinga	(Sri Lanka)	28 August 1983 (aged 32)	Right	Right-arm Fast
	Kumar Sangakkara	(Sri Lanka)	27 October 1977 (aged 38)	Left	Right-arm off break
	Imad Wasim	(Pakistan)	18 December 1988 (aged 27)	Left	Slow left-arm orthodox
	Rovman Powell	(Jamaica)	23 July 1993 (aged 22)	Right	Right-arm medium-fast
	Jon-Russ Jaggesar	(Trinidad and Tobago)	19 March 1986 (aged 30)	Right	Right-arm off spin
	Andre McCarthy	(Jamaica)	8 June 1987 (aged 29)	Right	Right-arm off break
	Jonathan Foo	(Guyana)	11 September 1990 (aged 25)	Right	Leg break googly
	Alex Ross	(Australia)	17 April 1992 (aged 24)	Right	Right-arm off break
	Kesrick Williams	(Saint Vincent and the Grenadines)	8 January 1990 (aged 26)	Right	Right-arm Fast
	Timroy Allen	(Jamaica)	22 January 1987 (aged 29)	Right	Right-arm medium-fast
	Oshane Thomas	(Jamaica)	18 February 1997 (aged 19)	Left	Right-arm medium-fast

== St Kitts and Nevis Patriots ==
No.	Player	Nat	Date of birth	Batting	Bowling style
	Lendl Simmons	(Trinidad and Tobago)	25 January 1985 (aged 31)	Right	Right-arm medium
	Brad Hodge	(Australia)	29 December 1974 (aged 41)	Right	Right-arm medium-fast
	Thisara Perera	(Sri Lanka)	3 April 1989 (aged 27)	Left	Right-arm medium-fast
	Evin Lewis	(Trinidad and Tobago)	27 December 1991 (aged 24)	Left
	Tabraiz Shamsi	(South Africa)	18 February 1990 (aged 26)	Right	Slow left-arm wrist-spin
	Nikhil Dutta	(Canada)	13 October 1994 (aged 21)	Right	Right-arm off break
	Devon Thomas (wk)	(Antigua and Barbuda)	12 November 1989 (aged 26)	Right	Right-arm medium
	Jonathan Carter	(Barbados)	16 November 1987 (aged 28)	Left	Right-arm medium
	Krishmar Santokie	(Jamaica)	20 December 1984 (aged 31)	Left	Left-arm medium-fast
	Tino Best	(Jamaica)	26 August 1981 (aged 33)	Right	Right-arm Fast
	Samuel Badree	(Trinidad and Tobago)	9 March 1981 (aged 35)	Right	Leg break
	Faf du Plessis	(South Africa)	13 July 1984 (aged 31)	Right	Right-armLeg break
	JJ Smuts	(South Africa)	21 August 1988 (aged 27)	Right	Slow left-arm orthodox
	Shamarh Brooks	(Barbados)	1 October 1988 (aged 27)	Right	Leg break
	Jeremiah Louis	(Saint Kitts and Nevis)	12 March 1996 (aged 20)	Right	Right-arm medium-fast
	Carlos Brathwaite	(Barbados)	18 July 1988 (aged 27)	Right	Right-arm fast-medium
	Kieran Powell	(Saint Kitts and Nevis)	6 March 1990 (aged 26)	Left	Right-arm medium
	Alzarri Joseph	(Antigua and Barbuda)	20 November 1996 (aged 19)	Right	Right-arm medium-fast

== St Lucia Zouks ==
No.	Player	Nat	Date of birth	Batting	Bowling style
	Darren Sammy (c)	(Saint Lucia)	20 December 1983 (aged 32)	Right	Right-arm medium-fast
	Shane Watson	(Australia)	17 June 1981 (aged 35)	Right	Right-arm Fast
	Johnson Charles (wk)	(Saint Lucia)	14 January 1989 (aged 27)	Right
	Andre Fletcher (wk)	(Grenada)	28 November 1987 (aged 28)	Right
	Eddie Leie	(South Africa)	16 November 1986 (aged 29)	Right	Leg break
	Denesh Ramdin (wk)	(Trinidad and Tobago)	13 March 1985 (aged 31)	Right
	Shane Shillingford	(Dominica)	22 February 1983 (aged 33)	Right	Right-arm off break
	Delorn Johnson	(Saint Vincent and the Grenadines)	15 September 1988 (aged 27)	Left	Left-arm Fast
	Kyle Mayers	(Barbados)	8 September 1992 (aged 23)	Left	Right-arm medium
	Keddy Lesporis	(Saint Lucia)	27 December 1988 (aged 27)	Right	Right-arm off break
	Derone Davis	(Barbados)	14 October 1992 (aged 23)	Left	Slow left-arm orthodox
	David Miller	(South Africa)	10 June 1989 (aged 27)	Left	Right-arm off break
	Morné Morkel	(South Africa)	6 October 1984 (aged 31)	Left	Right-arm Fast
	Michael Hussey	(Australia)	27 May 1975 (aged 41)	Left	Right-arm medium-Fast
	Nitish Kumar	(Canada)	21 May 1994 (aged 22)	Right	Right-arm Off break
	Kristopher Ramsaran	(Trinidad and Tobago)	1 February 1992 (aged 24)	Right	Slow left-arm wrist-spin
	Miguel Cummins	(Barbados)	5 September 1990 (aged 25)	Left	Right-arm fast
	Gidron Pope	(Saint Vincent and the Grenadines)	24 November 1996 (aged 19)	Left	Right-arm off break

== Trinbago Knight Riders ==
No.	Player	Nat	Date of birth	Batting	Bowling style
	Dwayne Bravo (c)	(Trinidad and Tobago)	7 October 1983 (aged 32)	Right	Right-arm medium-fast
	Kevon Cooper	(Trinidad and Tobago)	16 February 1989 (aged 27)	Right	Right-arm medium
	Sulieman Benn	(Barbados)	22 July 1981 (aged 34)	Left	Slow left-arm orthodox
	Javon Searles	(Barbados)	12 December 1986 (aged 29)	Right	Right-arm medium-fast
	William Perkins (wk)	(Barbados)	8 October 1986 (aged 29)	Right
	Sunil Narine	(Trinidad and Tobago)	26 May 1988 (aged 28)	Right	Right-arm off break
	Umar Akmal (wk)	(Pakistan)	26 May 1990 (aged 26)	Right	Right-arm Off spin
	Ronsford Beaton	(Guyana)	17 September 1992 (aged 23)	Right	Right-arm fast-medium
	Nikita Miller	(Jamaica)	16 May 1982 (aged 34)	Right	Slow left-arm orthodox
	Hamza Tariq (wk)	(Canada)	21 July 1990 (aged 25)	Right
	Brendon McCullum	(New Zealand)	27 September 1981 (aged 34)	Right	Right-arm fast-medium
	Hashim Amla	(South Africa)	31 March 1983 (aged 33)	Right	Right-arm fast-medium
	Colin Munro	(New Zealand)	12 March 1987 (aged 29)	Left	Right-arm fast-medium
	Anton Devcich	(New Zealand)	28 September 1985 (aged 30)	Left	Slow left-arm orthodox
	Ramnaresh Sarwan	(Guyana)	23 June 1980 (aged 36)	Right	Right-arm leg break
	Yannic Cariah	(Trinidad and Tobago)	21 June 1992 (aged 24)	Right	Slow left-arm orthodox
	Darren Bravo	(Trinidad and Tobago)	6 February 1989 (aged 27)	Left	Right-arm medium-fast
	Anderson Phillip	(Trinidad and Tobago)	22 August 1996 (aged 19)
