= 2017 Caribbean Premier League squads =

List of cricketers

The following players were selected for the 2017 Caribbean Premier League:

== Barbados Tridents ==
- Kieron Pollard
- Kane Williamson
- Shoaib Malik
- Dwayne Smith
- Nicholas Pooran
- Wayne Parnell
- Ravi Rampaul
- Wahab Riaz
- Raymon Reifer
- Christopher Barnwell
- Imran Khan
- Damion Jacobs
- Akeal Hosein
- Ryan Wiggins
- Tino Best
- Shamar Springer
- Akeem Dodson
- AB de Villiers
- Eoin Morgan

== Guyana Amazon Warriors ==
- Sohail Tanvir
- Martin Guptill
- Chadwick Walton
- ~~Chris Lynn~~
- Rayad Emrit
- Rashid Khan
- Jason Mohammed
- Steven Taylor
- Veerasammy Permaul
- Roshon Primus
- Gajanand Singh
- Assad Fudadin
- Keon Joseph
- Steven Jacobs
- Steven Katwaroo
- Shimron Hetmyer
- Ali Khan

Babar Azam replaced Chris Lynn, who was injured.

== Jamaica Tallawahs ==
- Lendl Simmons
- Kumar Sangakkara
- Shakib Al Hasan
- Imad Wasim
- Mohammad Sami
- Rovman Powell
- Gidron Pope
- Kesrick Williams
- Garey Mathurin
- Jon-Russ Jaggesar
- Krishmar Santokie
- Jonathan Foo
- Kennar Lewis
- Andre McCarthy
- Odean Smith
- Oshane Thomas
- Timroy Allen

== St Kitts and Nevis Patriots ==
- Chris Gayle
- Chris Morris
- ~~Ben Cutting~~
- Mohammad Nabi
- Evin Lewis
- Samuel Badree
- Jonathan Carter
- Tabraiz Shamsi
- Brandon King
- Devon Thomas
- Sheldon Cottrell
- ~~Kieran Powell~~
- Fabian Allen
- Shamarh Brooks
- Jeremiah Louis
- Alzarri Joseph
- Nikhil Dutta
- Carlos Brathwaite

Mohammad Hafeez and Hasan Ali replaced Ben Cutting and Kieran Powell respectively.

== St Lucia Stars ==
- David Miller
- Lasith Malinga
- Shane Watson
- Darren Sammy
- Johnson Charles
- Andre Fletcher
- Jerome Taylor
- Marlon Samuels
- Kamran Akmal
- Rahkeem Cornwall
- Kyle Mayers
- Shane Shillingford
- Eddie Leie
- Keddy Lesporis
- Sunil Ambris
- Obed McCoy
- Timil Patel

== Trinbago Knight Riders ==
- Dwayne Bravo
- Brendon McCullum
- Sunil Narine
- Hashim Amla
- Darren Bravo
- Denesh Ramdin
- Colin Munro
- Shadab Khan
- Khary Pierre
- Ronsford Beaton
- Javon Searles
- Nikita Miller
- William Perkins
- Kevon Cooper
- Anderson Phillip
- Hamza Tariq
- Mehedi Hasan Miraz
