= Kevin Stoute =

Barbadian cricketer

Personal information
- Full name: Kevin Andre Stoute
- Born: 12 November 1985 (age 41); Saint Michael Parish, Barbados
- Batting: Right-handed
- Bowling: Right-arm medium-fast
- Role: All-rounder

Domestic team information
- Years: Team
- 2007–2020: Barbados
- 2021–: Windward Islands
- FC debut: 4 January 2007 Barbados v Trinidad and Tobago
- LA debut: 9 January 2007 Barbados v Trinidad and Tobago

Career statistics
Competition	FC	LA	T20
Matches	76	53	8
Runs scored	2,929	1,185	84
Batting average	27.63	26.33	28.00
100s/50s	3/16	0/9	0/0
Top score	186	86	37*
Balls bowled	7,560	860	36
Wickets	154	30	1
Bowling average	21.76	26.23	62.00
5 wickets in innings	3	2	0
10 wickets in match	0	0	0
Best bowling	6/35	8/52	1/30
Catches/stumpings	39/–	15/–	1/–
- Source: , 8 February 2021

Kevin Andre Stoute (born 12 November 1985) is a Barbadian cricketer who played for the Barbadian national team in West Indian domestic cricket. He is a right-handed pace-bowling all-rounder.

Stoute was born in Black Rock, in Barbados' Saint Michael Parish. He made his first-class debut for Barbados during the 2006–07 Carib Beer Cup, aged 21. Stoute recorded his maiden first-class five-wicket haul towards the end of the following season, taking 6/64 in the second innings of a match against Trinidad and Tobago. During the 2008–09 Regional Four Day Competition, Stoute made 604 runs from nine matches, with only two Barbadians, Dwayne Smith and Ryan Hinds, scoring more. His season included two centuries – an even 100 against the Leeward Islands, followed by 186 against Guyana two games later.

In 2010, Stoute was selected to tour England and Ireland with the West Indies A team. In a one-off limited-overs fixture against Lancashire on the tour, he took figures of 8/52 from nine overs, although his performance was not enough to win his team the match. Stoute became only the third West Indian to take eight wickets in a List A innings, after Michael Holding and Keith Boyce, and only the tenth person overall. Before that match, he had only taken four wickets in his previous List A career. Despite also finishing as one of the leading run-scorers on the tour, with three half-centuries in six innings, Stoute has not made further appearances for West Indies A (or similar teams). For Barbados, he added another first-class century during the 2012–13 Regional Four Day Competition, 114 against the Leeward Islands, and also took 5/29 against Jamaica during the following season of the competition. Stoute made his captaincy debut for Barbados during the 2013–14 Regional Super50.

In June 2020, he was selected by the Windward Islands, in the players' draft hosted by Cricket West Indies ahead of the 2020–21 domestic season.
