= Trevon Griffith =

Jamaican cricketer

Personal information
- Full name: Trevon Abishai Griffith
- Born: 18 April 1991 (age 35); Jamaica
- Batting: Left-handed
- Bowling: Right-arm off spin

Domestic team information
- Years: Team
- 2012–2015: Guyana
- 2013–2015: Guyana Amazon Warriors (CPL)
- 2016-present: Jamaica

Career statistics
Competition	FC	LA	T20
Matches	12	22	14
Runs scored	378	371	208
Batting average	17.18	17.66	16.00
100s/50s	0/2	0/2	0/0
Top score	58	62	41
Catches/stumpings	13/0	7/0	5/0
- Source: CricketArchive, 7 May 2017

Trevon Abashai Griffith (born 18 April 1991) is a Jamaican cricketer who has played for both Guyana and Jamaica in West Indian domestic cricket, and also for the Guyana Amazon Warriors franchise in the Caribbean Premier League (CPL). He is a left-handed opening batsman.

Griffith played for the West Indies under-19s at the 2010 Under-19 World Cup in New Zealand, scoring 84 runs in a group-stage match against Pakistan. The previous year, he had also played at List A level for the team, when it appeared in the 2009–10 WICB President's Cup. Griffith made his senior debut for Guyana during the 2011–12 Regional Super50, and his first-class debut in the 2011–12 Regional Four Day Competition. He scored his maiden first-class half-century during the 2013–14 season, an innings of 58 against the Leeward Islands. Prior to the 2015–16 season, Griffith was drafted to Jamaica, eventually making his debut for the team in January 2016, in the 2015–16 Regional Super50. He signed with the Amazon Warriors for the inaugural 2013 Caribbean Premier League, but has only made sporadic appearances in that competition.

In June 2021, he was selected to take part in the Minor League Cricket tournament in the United States following the players' draft.
