= Abdulahad Malik =

Indian cricketer (born 1986)

Abdulahad Malik (born 9 August 1986) is an Indian former cricketer who played for Gujarat as a wicket-keeper.

Born in Hansot, Gujarat, Malik was signed by Rajasthan Royals but failed to make an appearance in the IPL due to the presence of first-choice wicket-keeper Naman Ojha.

In 2013, he along with Manpreet Juneja set the highest ever fourth wicket partnership in any form of T20 cricket (202).
