= Nicholas Kirton =

Barbadian-Canadian cricketer (born 1998)

Personal information
- Full name: Nicholas Rasheed Kirton
- Born: 6 May 1998 (age 28); Bridgetown, Barbados
- Batting: Left-handed
- Role: Middle-order batsman

International information
- National side: Canada (2018–2025)
- ODI debut (cap 88): 27 March 2023 v Jersey
- Last ODI: 26 September 2024 v Oman
- T20I debut (cap 52): 20 October 2019 v Jersey
- Last T20I: 3 October 2024 v Oman

Domestic team information
- Years: Team
- 2018: Combined Campuses and Colleges
- 2018: Montreal Tigers
- 2019–Present: Barbados
- 2020: Jamaica Tallawahs
- 2024-: Biratnagar Kings

Career statistics
| Competition | FC | LA | T20 |
|---|---|---|---|
| Matches | 4 | 56 | 28 |
| Runs scored | 81 | 1,328 | 590 |
| Batting average | 11.57 | 34.95 | 25.65 |
| 100s/50s | 0/0 | 1/10 | 0/2 |
| Top score | 47 | 108* | 69* |
| Balls bowled | 30 | 528 | 30 |
| Wickets | 0 | 7 | 1 |
| Bowling average | – | 50.85 | 73.00 |
| 5 wickets in innings | – | 0 | 0 |
| 10 wickets in match | – | 0 | 0 |
| Best bowling | – | 2/26 | 1/14 |
| Catches/stumpings | 5/0 | 31/0 | 8/0 |
- Source: Cricinfo, 31 October 2024

Nicholas Kirton (born 6 May 1998) is a Barbadian-born Canadian cricketer. He has played for the Canada national cricket team since 2018. He has also represented the Barbados national cricket team in West Indian domestic cricket and the Jamaica Tallawahs in the Caribbean Premier League. He plays as a left-handed middle-order batsman.

== Personal life ==
Kirton was born in Bridgetown, Barbados on 6 May 1998. His mother was born in Canada, making him eligible to play international cricket for both Canada and the West Indies.

In April 2025, Kirton was taken into custody by the Barbados Police Service after arriving at Grantley Adams International Airport on an Air Canada. It was subsequently reported that he had been arrested in connection with an investigation into the importation of 20 pounds (9.1 kg) of cannabis seized at the airport.

== Domestic career ==
In June 2018, Kirton was selected to play for the Montreal Tigers in the players' draft for the inaugural edition of the Global T20 Canada tournament. He made his first-class debut for Barbados in the 2018–19 Regional Four Day Competition on 17 January 2019. In October 2019, he was selected to play for Barbados in the 2019–20 Regional Super50 tournament. In July 2020, he was named in the Jamaica Tallawahs squad for the 2020 Caribbean Premier League.

== International career ==
Kirton made his List A debut for Canada in the 2018 ICC World Cricket League Division Two tournament on 8 February 2018.

In October 2019, he was named in Canada's squad for the 2019 ICC T20 World Cup Qualifier tournament in the United Arab Emirates. He made his Twenty20 International (T20I) debut for Canada, against Jersey, on 20 October 2019.

In March 2023, he was named in Canada's squad for the 2023 Cricket World Cup Qualifier Play-off. He made his One Day International (ODI) debut on 27 March 2023, for Canada, against Jersey in that tournament.

In May 2024, he was named in Canada's squad for the 2024 ICC Men's T20 World Cup tournament.
