= Ryan Scott (cricketer) =

American cricketer (born 1995)

Personal information
- Full name: Ryan Mark Scott
- Born: 25 September 1995 (age 31); Kingston, Jamaica
- Batting: Left-handed
- Role: Batsman

International information
- National side: United States
- T20I debut (cap 25): 22 December 2021 v Ireland
- Last T20I: 23 December 2021 v Ireland

Career statistics
Competition	T20I
Matches	2
Runs scored	19
Batting average	9.50
100s/50s	0/0
Top score	11
Catches/stumpings	0/–
- Source: Cricinfo, 11 January 2022

Ryan Mark Scott (born 25 September 1995) is an American cricketer of Jamaican background, who plays as a batsman for the United States national cricket team. He made his Twenty20 International (T20I) debut on 22 December 2021, for the United States against Ireland. He currently coaches for the Maryland branch of Joe Root’s Root Academy team, operating out of Columbia, Maryland.
