= Muditha Fernando =

Sri Lankan cricketer (born 1980)

Personal information
- Full name: Pallidora Hewage Muditha Gayan Fernando
- Born: 9 September 1980 (age 45)
- Source: Cricinfo, 22 April 2021

Muditha Fernando (born 9 September 1980) is a Sri Lankan former cricketer. He played in 62 first-class and 36 List A matches between 2000/01 and 2014/15. He made his Twenty20 debut on 17 August 2004, for Kurunegala Youth Cricket Club in the 2004 SLC Twenty20 Tournament.
