= Sunny Patel =

Indian cricketer (born 1987)

Sunny Patel (born 10 April 1987) is an Indian first-class and List A cricketer. He is a right-handed batsman and right-arm leg break bowler. He played for the Gujarat cricket team in domestic cricket making thirteen first-class and seventeen List A appearances. He made his entrance to Twenty20 cricket for the first time on 5 April 2007, against the Baroda, during the 2007 Inter State Twenty20 Tournament. He made his first-class debut on 3 November 2008, against the Saurashtra, during the second match of the 2008–09 Ranji Trophy. He shone on his debut match scoring 90 runs in the first innings, which helped Gujarat to secure 581 runs and have an emphatic win. Prior to his first-class debut, on 27 February 2008, he made his List A debut against the Maharashtra, during the 2007–08 Vijay Hazare Trophy.
