= Anthony Bramble =

Guyanese cricketer

Personal information
- Born: 11 December 1990 (age 35); Berbice, Guyana
- Batting: Right-handed
- Role: Wicket-keeper

Domestic team information
- Years: Team
- 2010–present: Guyana
- 2016–present: Guyana Amazon Warriors (squad no. 35)

Career statistics
Competition	FC	LA	T20
Matches	66	56	17
Runs scored	2742	803	106
Batting average	30.46	20.07	9.63
100s/50s	3/12	0/2	0/0
Top score	196*	69	27*
Catches/stumpings	224/28	57/12	13/2
- Source: Cricinfo, 8 October 2021

Anthony Bramble (born 11 December 1990) is a Guyanese cricketer who plays for the Guyanese national side in West Indian domestic cricket. He plays as a wicket-keeper.

== Early and domestic career ==
A former Guyana under-19s player, Bramble made his senior debut for Guyana during the 2010–11 WICB Cup, a limited-overs competition. His first-class debut came several years later, during the 2012–13 Regional Four Day Competition, when he replaced the out-of-form Derwin Christian in the team. Bramble scored his maiden first-class half-century during the 2013–14 season, an innings of 64 not out against the Combined Campuses and Colleges. On 30 June 2016 he made his Twenty20 debut in the 2016 Caribbean Premier League.

In December 2017, he scored his maiden first-class century, batting for Guyana against the Leeward Islands in the 2017–18 Regional Four Day Competition. In October 2019, he was named in Guyana's squad for the 2019–20 Regional Super50 tournament. In July 2020, he was named in the Guyana Amazon Warriors squad for the 2020 Caribbean Premier League.

== International career ==
In June 2018, he was named in the Cricket West Indies B Team squad for the inaugural edition of the Global T20 Canada tournament.

In July 2019, he was named in the West Indies' Twenty20 International (T20I) squad for their series against India.

Anthony Bramble played for the New Jersey Stallions in Minor League Cricket in 2022 helping them reach the Atlantic Conference finals. He had a Top 5 finish among the batsmen scoring 486 runs with a 34.71 average.
