= Kirstan Kallicharan =

Trinidadian cricketer (born 1999)

Personal information
- Full name: Kirstan Ajay Kallicharan
- Born: 29 December 1999 (age 26); Trinidad and Tobago
- Batting: Right-handed
- Bowling: Right-arm off break
- Role: All rounder
- Source: Cricinfo, 26 January 2017

Kirstan Kallicharan (born 29 December 1999) is a Trinidadian cricketer. He made his List A debut for the West Indies Under-19s in the 2016–17 Regional Super50 on 25 January 2017. Prior to his List A debut, he was named in the West Indies squad for the 2016 Under-19 Cricket World Cup squads. In November 2017, he was named as the vice captain of the West Indies squad for the 2018 Under-19 Cricket World Cup.

In June 2018, he was named the Best U19 Cricketer of the Year at the annual Cricket West Indies' Awards.
