= Steven Katwaroo =

West Indian cricketer (born 1993)

Personal information
- Born: 14 January 1993 (age 33); Trinidad
- Batting: Right-handed
- Role: Wicket-keeper

Domestic team information
- Years: Team
- 2011–present: Trinidad and Tobago

Career statistics
Competition	First-class	List A
Matches	38	20
Runs scored	1,225	75
Batting average	19.44	10.71
100s/50s	0/8	0/0
Top score	91	31
Balls bowled	0	0
Wickets	0	0
Bowling average	-	-
5 wickets in innings	-	-
10 wickets in match	-	-
Best bowling	-	-
Catches/stumpings	83/9	16/9
- Source: CricketArchive, 10 October 2021

Steven Katwaroo (born 25 April 1993) is a Trinidadian cricketer who plays for Trinidad and Tobago in West Indian domestic cricket. He plays as a wicket-keeper.

Katwaroo represented the West Indies under-19s at the 2012 Under-19 World Cup in Australia. He had made his senior debut for Trinidad and Tobago the previous season, aged 18, during the 2011–12 Regional Super50. Katwaroo made his first-class debut for Trinidad and Tobago during the 2012–13 Regional Four Day Competition, and scored 55 runs in his first innings, made against the Leeward Islands from ninth in the batting order. His highest first-class score to date also came against the Leeward Islands, an innings of 91 made during the 2013–14 season. He and Akeal Hosein (102 not out) put on 197 runs for the seventh wicket, a team record.

In November 2019, he was named in Trinidad and Tobago's squad for the 2019–20 Regional Super50 tournament.
