= Ryan Wiggins =

Barbadian cricketer (born 1984)

Personal information
- Full name: Ryan Alexander Wiggins
- Born: 30 January 1984 (age 42); Barbados

Domestic team information
- Years: Team
- 2007, 2016-present: Barbados
- 2010-2016: Combined Campuses and Colleges

Career statistics
Competition	FC	List A	T20
Matches	1	10	16
Runs scored	5	177	169
Batting average	2.50	25.28	15.36
100s/50s	0/0	0/2	0/0
Top score	4	52*	39*
Balls bowled	-	144	84
Wickets	-	2	3
Bowling average	-	62.50	41.33
5 wickets in innings	0	0	0
10 wickets in match	0	0	0
Best bowling	-/-	1/14	1/21
Catches/stumpings	0/0	1/0	4/0
- Source: Cricinfo, 5 May 2017

Ryan Wiggins (born 30 January 1984) is a Barbadian cricketer. He made his first-class debut for Barbados in the 2016–17 Regional Four Day Competition on 15 April 2017. In June 2021, he was selected to take part in the Minor League Cricket tournament in the United States following the players' draft.
