= Gajanand Singh =

American cricketer

Personal information
- Born: October 3, 1987 (age 39); Cumberland, East Berbice-Corentyne, Guyana
- Batting: Left-handed
- Bowling: Right-arm off-spin
- Role: Batsman

International information
- National side: United States
- ODI debut (cap 33): September 6, 2021 v PNG
- Last ODI: June 18, 2023 v West Indies
- T20I debut (cap 18): November 7, 2021 v Belize
- Last T20I: July 17, 2022 v PNG

Domestic team information
- Years: Team
- 2007/08–2010/11: Guyana
- 2017: Guyana Amazon Warriors (squad no. 46)

Career statistics
| Competition | ODI | T20I | FC |
|---|---|---|---|
| Matches | 27 | 11 | 10 |
| Runs scored | 835 | 163 | 376 |
| Batting average | 37.95 | 27.16 | 25.06 |
| 100s/50s | 1/5 | 0/2 | 0/2 |
| Top score | 101* | 65 | 66 |
| Balls bowled | 89 | – | 65 |
| Wickets | 6 | – | 1 |
| Bowling average | 10.00 | – | 25.00 |
| 5 wickets in innings | 0 | – | 0 |
| 10 wickets in match | 0 | – | 0 |
| Best bowling | 4/15 | – | 1/22 |
| Catches/stumpings | 13/– | 5/– | 2/– |
- Source: Cricinfo, June 18, 2023

Gajanand Singh (born October 3, 1987) is a Guyanese-American cricketer who plays for the United States national cricket team. He previously represented the West Indies under-19 cricket team at the 2006 U-19 Cricket World Cup in Sri Lanka and played first-class and List A cricket for Guyana.

Singh made his Twenty20 debut for Guyana Amazon Warriors in the 2017 Caribbean Premier League on August 6, 2017.

In January 2021, USA Cricket named Singh in a 44-man squad to begin training in Texas ahead of the 2021 Oman Tri-Nation Series. In June 2021, he was selected to take part in the Minor League Cricket tournament in the United States following the players' draft. In August 2021, Singh was named in the United States' One Day International (ODI) squad for the rescheduled tri-series in Oman and their matches against Papua New Guinea. He made his ODI debut on 6 September 2021, for the United States against Papua New Guinea.

In October 2021, he was named in the American Twenty20 International (T20I) squad for the 2021 ICC Men's T20 World Cup Americas Qualifier tournament in Antigua. He made his T20I debut on November 7, 2021, for the United States against Belize.

In May 2024, he was named a reserve player of the American squad for the 2024 ICC Men's T20 World Cup tournament.
