= Derone Davis =

West Indian cricketer (born 1992)

Personal information
- Full name: Derone Yohann Anthony Davis
- Born: October 14, 1992 (age 34); Trinidad
- Batting: Left-handed
- Bowling: Slow left-arm orthodox

Career statistics
Competition	List A	T20
Matches	3	5
Runs scored	38	21
Batting average	19	21
100s/50s	0/0	0/0
Top score	18	8*
Balls bowled	151	94
Wickets	6	6
Bowling average	18	15.16
5 wickets in innings	0	0
10 wickets in match	0	0
Best bowling	3/31	4/5
Catches/stumpings	1/–	5/–
- Source: ESPNcricinfo, 6 December 2022

Derone Davis (born 14 October 1992) is a West Indies cricketer. He was in the West Indies Under-19 squad for the 2012 ICC Under-19 Cricket World Cup. In June 2021, he was selected to take part in the Minor League Cricket tournament in the United States following the players' draft.
