= Christopher Barnwell =

West Indian cricketer

Personal information
- Full name: Christopher Dion Barnwell
- Born: 6 January 1987 (age 39); St. Cuthbert's Mission, Guyana
- Batting: Right-handed
- Bowling: Right-arm medium fast

International information
- National side: West Indies
- T20I debut (cap 42): 21 April 2011 v Pakistan
- Last T20I: 28 July 2013 v Pakistan
- T20I shirt no.: 90

Domestic team information
- Years: Team
- 2008–2021: Guyana (squad no. 90)
- 2013–2016: Guyana Amazon Warriors
- 2017: Barbados Tridents

Career statistics
Competition	T20I	FC	LA	T20
Matches	6	61	66	94
Runs scored	78	2,406	1,650	1,160
Batting average	19.50	24.80	29.46	18.12
100s/50s	0/0	2/12	1/10	0/2
Top score	34*	148	107	88
Balls bowled	36	5,118	1,286	660
Wickets	1	85	31	25
Bowling average	51.00	33.31	35.41	35.64
5 wickets in innings	0	3	0	0
10 wickets in match	0	0	0	0
Best bowling	1/24	6/78	4/31	2/4
Catches/stumpings	2/–	47/–	24/–	30/–
- Source: ESPNcricinfo, 9 October 2021

Christopher Dion Barnwell (born 6 January 1987) is a West Indian former cricketer who played first-class and List A cricket for Guyana. A Guyana-born all-rounder, Barnwell was better known for his clever bowling, but was also a useful pinch hitter in the limited overs format.

Barnwell made his T20I debut for West Indies on 21 April 2011 in the home series against Pakistan. He also played in the one-off T20 match against India on 4 June 2011, in which he scored an unbeaten 34 off just 16 deliveries and also took his maiden T20I wicket. He was also picked for the 2-match T20I series in England in September later that year.

Barnwell was picked up by Royal Challengers Bangalore in the player auction for IPL 2013. In the 2017 CPL Draft, he was selected as a 10th round pick by the Barbados Tridents. In October 2019, he was named in Guyana's squad for the 2019–20 Regional Super50 tournament. He was the leading run-scorer for Guyana in the tournament, with 351 runs in eight matches.
