= Javon Searles =

West Indian cricketer (born 1986)

Personal information
- Full name: Javon Philip Ramon Scantlebury-Searles
- Born: 21 December 1986 (age 39); Barbados
- Batting: Right-handed
- Bowling: Right-arm fast-medium

Domestic team information
- Years: Team
- Trinbago Knight Riders
- 2018: Kolkata Knight Riders (squad no. 86)

Career statistics
Competition	FC	LA	T20
Matches	9	15	37
Runs scored	102	107	188
Batting average	7.84	13.37	10.44
100s/50s	0/1	0/0	0/0
Top score	56*	22	29
Balls bowled	899	512	344
Wickets	26	19	22
Bowling average	20.80	21.36	21.09
5 wickets in innings	2	0	0
10 wickets in match	1	0	0
Best bowling	6/44	3/23	4/5
Catches/stumpings	8/0	4/0	19/0
- Source: ESPNcricinfo, 27 April 2018

Javon Ramon Searles (born 21 December 1986) played seven matches for West Indies at Under 19 level, including four matches in the 2006 U-19 Cricket World Cup in Sri Lanka. He has played in one List A match for Barbados in 2006–07, in which he scored nought and did not bowl. In January 2018, he was bought by the Kolkata Knight Riders in the 2018 IPL auction. In October 2019, he was selected to play for Barbados in the 2019–20 Regional Super50 tournament.
