= Jonathan Foo =

Guyanese cricketer

Personal information
- Full name: Jonathan Alexander Foo
- Born: 11 September 1990 (age 36); Port Mourant, Guyana
- Batting: Right-handed
- Bowling: Leg spin & googly
- Role: All rounder
- Source: CricInfo, 12 March 2017

Jonathan Alexander Foo (born 11 September 1990) is a Guyanese cricketer. An all-rounder, Foo is a leg spin bowler and lower order batsman for Guyana who made his national debut in the 2010 Caribbean Twenty20. He played a leading role in the final of that tournament, scoring 42 runs from 17 balls to help Guyana to victory over Barbados.

Born in Port Mourant in the Berbice region of Guyana, Foo is Chinese on his father's side and his mother is Indian. He started playing cricket after watching his uncles play for Albion Sports Club. When he was 12, he was chosen for the Guyana Under-15 team which competed in the WICB tournament in St Vincent in 2003. He also played in the Under-17 and Under 20 teams.

In 2010 he played for Guyana in the inaugural West Indies Cricket Board Caribbean T20 title. He played for Albion Cricket Club in the interim, and in 2015, he returned to the Guyana national team.

He was selected by the Jamaica Tallawahs for the 2016 CPL, and was selected by the same team in the player draft for the 2017 edition. He has taken part in both editions of the Hong Kong T20 Blitz, playing for the Hung Hom JD Jaguars.

In October 2019, he was named in Guyana's squad for the 2019–20 Regional Super50 tournament.

He signed for the Philadelphians, which play in the Minor League Cricket season.
