= 2013–14 Regional Four Day Competition =

Cricket tournament

- Dates: 28 February 2014 – 29 April 2014
- Administrator(s): WICB
- Cricket format: First-class (four-day)
- Tournament format(s): Round-robin, followed by Knock-out
- Champions: Jamaica
- Participants: 7
- Matches: 24
- Most runs: (Jamaica) Jermaine Blackwood (611)
- Most wickets: (British Windward Islands) Keon Peters (40)

The 2013–14 Regional Four Day Competition was the 48th edition of the Regional Four Day Competition, the domestic first-class cricket competition for the countries of the West Indies Cricket Board(WICB). The competition started on 28 February 2014 and Final finished on 29 April 2014.

== Points table ==
Teams	P	W	L	T	D	N/R	Pts
Barbados	6	4	1	0	1	0	82
Trinidad and Tobago	6	4	1	0	1	0	80
Windward Islands	6	3	2	0	1	0	65
Jamaica	6	3	3	0	0	0	59
(Cricket West Indies) Combined Campuses and Colleges	6	2	3	0	1	0	49
Leeward Islands	6	2	4	0	0	0	42
Guyana	6	0	4	0	2	0	29

Source: ESPNcricinfo.
