= 2026 Washington Freedom season =

Washington Freedom
2026 season
- Coach: Ricky Ponting
- Captain: Steve Smith
- Overseas player: Glenn Maxwell; Mark Chapman; Ben Dwarshuis; Rachin Ravindra; Mitchell Owen; Marco Jansen; Jack Edwards; Lockie Ferguson
- League stage: 3rd
- MLC finals: Runners-up
- Most runs: Andries Gous (543)

The 2026 Washington Freedom season was the fourth season of the Washington Freedom franchise in Major League Cricket (MLC). The team was captained by Steven Smith, who returned from an injury and international commitments, and coached by Ricky Ponting.

The first half of the tournament was a mixed bag overall for the Freedom, marked by a loss-win trend; in their season opener against Seattle in Dallas, an Ottneil Baartman 4-fer set up a 5-wicket loss, while a day later Mitchell Owen's record-breaking 155 delivered their first win of the season against New York. The pattern held as Jessy Singh's 5-fer handed the Freedom a crushing 88-run defeat to Seattle before a last-ball six by Nikhil Chaudhary capped off a thrilling win over Texas. The Freedom ended its Oakland leg and reached the tournament's halfway stage with a battering 8-wicket defeat to San Francisco, set up by Lhuan-dre Pretorius' 26-ball 66. Heading into the Pomona leg of the tournament, the Freedom maintained a 2–3 record, placing outside of the top four.

The second half of the tournament was dominant; the Freedom went 4–1 in their five remaining games. By routing Los Angeles by six wickets and overcoming San Francisco by five, the team snapped their loss-win trend and soared to the top of the table. Barring an 18-run loss in a rematch to Los Angeles, the Freedom won their next two games against Texas and New York by three and five wickets, clinching a third-place group stage finish and a playoff spot for the fourth year running. In their first eliminator game, Andries Gous' 132 and Smith's 110* led the Freedom to triumph in a record-breaking chase of 267, driving the team's rally into the challenger match, where Gous' 73 propelled the Freedom past San Francisco into the final for the third straight time. At the final, the Freedom were beat out narrowly by one run as Shadley van Schalkwyk held on, three wickets falling in the final over.

== Background ==
Ahead of the start of the season, the Freedom retained the core of their squad from the previous seasons, including Steven Smith, Glenn Maxwell, Marco Jansen, Rachin Ravindra, Lockie Ferguson, Jack Edwards, Mitchell Owen and Mark Chapman. The team also retained several domestic players such as Andries Gous, Saurabh Netravalkar, and Ian Holland. The team added overseas signings Ben Dwarshuis and Nikhil Chaudhary, replacing players amongst the like of Justin Dill and Glenn Phillips.

The Freedom began their season with a 5-wicket loss to Seattle a 30-runs win over New York – courtesy of Mitchell Owen smashed 155 the highest score in MLC history. a 88-run loss to Seattlea 1-wicket win over Texas a 8-wicket loss to San Francisco a 6-wicket win over Los Angeles a 5-wicket over San Francisco a 18-run defeat over Los Angeles a 3-wicket win over Texas a 5-wicket win over New York After shooting up to a 3rd-place group stage finish heading into the playoffs, in the Eliminator a 6-wicket win over New York — courtesy of Freedom smashed 270/4, recorded biggest run chase in T20 history. in the Challenger a 7-run win over San Francisco — Freedom made their third straight final in MLC Freedom recorded back-to-back victories against New York and San Francisco in the Eliminator and Challenger matches, respectively, to go to the finals, in the Final a 1-run defeat over Los Angeles — Freedom ultimately were downed by 1 runs in a last-ball thriller, providing Los Angeles with their first MLC championship.

== Squad ==
- Players with international caps are listed in **bold**.

Washington Freedom 2026
Name	Nat.	Date of Birth	Batting Style	Bowling Style	Year signed	Notes
Batters
**Steve Smith**	Australia	June 2, 1989 (age 37)	Right-handed	Right-arm leg spin	2024	Direct signing
**Mark Chapman**	New Zealand	June 27, 1994 (age 32)	Left-handed	Slow left-arm orthodox	2025	Direct signing
Jack Edwards	Australia	April 19, 2000 (age 26)	Right-handed	—N/a	2024	Direct signing
**Mukhtar Ahmed**	Pakistan	December 20, 1992 (age 33)	Right-handed	Right-arm leg break googly	2023	
All-rounders
**Mitchell Owen**	Australia	16 September 2001 (age 25)	Right-handed	Right-arm medium	2025	
**Glenn Maxwell**	Australia	October 14, 1988 (age 37)	Right-handed	Right-arm off break	2024	Direct signing
**Rachin Ravindra**	New Zealand	November 18, 1999 (age 26)	Left-handed	Slow left-arm orthodox	2024	Direct signing
Obus Pienaar	United States	December 12, 1989 (age 36)	Right-handed	Left-arm off spin	2023	
**Ian Holland**	United States	October 3, 1990 (age 35)	Right-handed	Right-arm medium	2024	
Wicket-keeper
**Andries Gous**	United States	November 24, 1993 (age 32)	Right-handed		2023	
Lahiru Milantha	Sri Lanka	May 28, 1994 (age 32)	Left-handed		2024	
Bowlers
**Saurabh Netravalkar**	United States	October 16, 1991 (age 34)	Right-handed	Left-arm medium fast	2023	
**Marco Jansen**	South Africa	1 May 2000	Right-handed	Left-arm fast	2023	Direct signing
**Lockie Ferguson**	New Zealand	June 13, 1991 (age 35)	Right-handed	Right-arm fast	2024	Direct signing
**Ben Dwarshuis**	Australia	23 June 1994	Left-handed	Left-arm fast-medium	2023	Direct signing
**Amila Aponso**	United States	June 23, 1993 (age 33)	Right-handed	Slow left-arm orthodox	2024	
**Yasir Mohammad**	United States	October 10, 2002 (age 23)	Left-handed	Legbreak Googly	2024	

== League stage ==
Match 3
June 19, 2026
19:30 (D/N)
Scorecard

Washington Freedom; 216 (20 overs)	v	Seattle Orcas; 219/5 (17.4 overs)
Mitchell Owen 61 (25); Ottneil Baartman 4/33 (4 overs)		Tim Seifert 78 (33); Ian Holland 2/20 (3.4 overs)

Seattle Orcas won by 5 wickets
Grand Prairie Stadium, Grand Prairie
Umpires: Vijaya Mallela (USA) and Leslie Reifer (WI)
Player of the match: Ottneil Baartman (Seattle Orcas)

- Seattle Orcas won the toss and elected to field.

Match 5
June 20, 2026
19:30 (D/N)
Scorecard

Washington Freedom; 245/5 (20 overs)	v	MI New York; 215/6 (20 overs)
Mitchell Owen 155 (68); Corey Anderson 1/27 (2 overs)		Kieron Pollard 100* (56); Glenn Maxwell 2/37 (4 overs)

Washington Freedom won by 30 runs
Grand Prairie Stadium, Grand Prairie
Umpires: Vijaya Mallela (UAS) and Rushane Samuels (WI)
Player of the match: Mitchell Owen (Washington Freedom)

- MI New York won the toss and elected to field.

== Standing ==
=== Points table ===
Pos	Team	Pld	W	L	NR	Pts	NRR	Qualification
1	San Francisco Unicorns (3rd)	10	6	4	0	12	0.487	Advanced to Qualifier
2	Los Angeles Knight Riders (C)	10	6	4	0	12	0.245	Advanced to Qualifier
3	Washington Freedom (R)	10	6	4	0	12	−0.399	Advanced to Eliminator
4	MI New York (4th)	10	5	5	0	10	−0.165	Advanced to Eliminator
5	Seattle Orcas	10	4	6	0	8	0.034	Eliminated
6	Texas Super Kings	10	3	7	0	6	−0.151	Eliminated

Source: ESPNCricinfo
(C) Champions; (R) Runners-up

=== Match summary ===
Team	Group matches										Playoffs		
Team	1	2	3	4	5	6	7	8	9	10	Q/E	C	F
Washington Freedom	0	2	2	4	4	6	8	8	10	12	W	W	L

Win	Loss	Tie	No Result

== Playoffs ==
Qualifier
July 15 – Oakland
1	Unicorns	180/4 (20 overs)
2	Knight Riders	187/3 (20 overs)
Eliminator
July 15 – Oakland
3	Washington Freedom	270/4 (18.4 overs)
4	MI New York	266/9 (20 overs)

Challenger
July 16 – Oakland
QL	Unicorns	231/6 (20 overs)
EW	Washington Freedom	238/6 (20 overs)

Final
July 18 – Oakland
QW	Knight Riders	164 (19.4 overs)
CW	Washington Freedom	163/9 (20 overs)

=== Eliminator ===
Eliminator
July 15, 2026
18:30 (D/N)
Scorecard

MI New York; 266/9 (20 overs)	v	Washington Freedom; 270/4 (18.4 overs)
Nicholas Pooran 106 (33); Rachin Ravindra 4/29 (4 overs)		Andries Gous 132 (51); Shakib Al Hasan 2/34 (4 overs)

Washington Freedom won by 6 wickets
Oakland Coliseum, Oakland
Umpires: Wayne Knights (NZ) and Jermaine Lindo (USA)
Player of the match: Andries Gous (Washington Freedom)

- Washington Freedom won the toss and elected to field.
- Andries Gous (Washington Freedom) became the first American cricketer to score a century in MLC.
- Nicholas Pooran (MI New York) became the first cricketer to score the fastest half-century (off 14 balls), breaking Rovman Powell's record (off 15 balls) and the fastest century (off 31 balls), breaking Finn Allen's record (off 34 balls) in MLC.

=== Challenger ===
Challenger
July 16, 2026
18:30 (D/N)
Scorecard

Washington Freedom; 238/6 (20 overs)	v	San Francisco Unicorns; 231/6 (20 overs)
Andries Gous 73 (40); Xavier Bartlett 3/36 (4 overs)		Matthew Short 121* (56); Ben Dwarshuis 2/44 (4 overs)

Washington Freedom won by 7 runs
Oakland Coliseum, Oakland
Umpires: Leslie Reifer (WI) and Rushane Samuels (WI)

- San Francisco Unicorns won the toss elected to field.

== Final ==
Final
July 18, 2026
16:30 (D/N)
Scorecard

Los Angeles Knight Riders; 164 (19.4 overs)	v	Washington Freedom; 163/9 (20 overs)
Andre Fletcher 47 (27); Ben Dwarshuis 3/31 (4 overs)		Obus Pienaar 53 (24); Sunil Narine 3/13 (4 overs)

Los Angeles Knight Riders won by 1 run
Oakland Coliseum, Oakland
Umpires: Gregory Brathwaite (WI) and Wayne Knights (NZ)
Player of the match: Sunil Narine (Los Angeles Knight Riders)

- Washington Freedom won the toss and elected to field.

== Administration and support staff ==
Washington Freedom staff
Position	Name
Head coach	(Australia) Ricky Ponting
General Manager	(Australia) Michael Klinger
Bowling coach	(South Africa) Dale Steyn
Assistant coach	(England) Samit Patel
Team manager	(England) Andrew Lynch
Strength and conditioning	(Pakistan) Umar Gul
High performance analyst	(Afghanistan) Zamir Khan
Physiotherapist	(Afghanistan) Noor Ali Zadran
