= 2025 Washington Freedom season =

Washington Freedom
2025 season
- Coach: Ricky Ponting
- Captain: Glenn Maxwell
- Overseas player: Glenn Maxwell; Mark Chapman; Ben Sears; Jason Behrendorff; Mitchell Owen; Glenn Phillips; Jack Edwards; Lockie Ferguson
- League stage: 1st place
- MLC finals: Runners-up
- Most runs: Mitchell Owen (313 runs)
- Most wickets: Jack Edwards (14); Mitchell Owen (14)

The 2025 Washington Freedom season was the third season of the Washington Freedom franchise in Major League Cricket (MLC). The team, which was without last year's captain Steven Smith due to injury, was captained by fellow Australian teammate Glenn Maxwell and coached by Ricky Ponting.

As defending champions, the Freedom began their season with a crushing 123-run loss to San Francisco – courtesy of Finn Allen's mammoth 151. They quickly recovered, going 4-0 with a 5-wicket win over Seattle, a heavy 113-run Maxwell-powered victory over Los Angeles, a thrilling last-over 2-wicket game against New York, and a high-scoring 7-wicket chase against Texas. The Freedom closed off their Dallas leg of the tournament strong by again defeating Los Angeles via a last-ball single and delivering San Francisco a 12-run defeat, their first of the season. Ensured of a playoff berth, Washington headed into Lauderhill with a 6-1 record, tied with San Francisco on points but lower on net run rate.

At Lauderhill, in a rain-affected game, the Freedom began poorly with a hefty 43-run defeat to Texas. However, in a play for a top-two finish, the Freedom steamrolled Seattle by 8 wickets and eased past New York by 6 wickets. After shooting up to a first-place group stage finish heading into the playoffs, the Freedom advanced on higher seeding to play New York in the final following a Qualifier 1 washout. They were ultimately downed by 5 runs in a last-over thriller, providing New York with their second MLC championship.

== Background ==
On January 10, 2025, ahead of the domestic platers' draft, MLC announced that the tournament's third season would begin play on June 13 in Oakland, and end with the final on July 13. In February, the Freedom released a list of retained overseas players', containing the likes of Maxwell, Smith, and Rachin Ravindra. They further retained domestic bulwarks Andries Gous, Saurabh Netravalkar, and Ian Holland, amongst others.

Prior to the season opener, the team signed a slew of overseas players–the likes of Mitchell Owen, Mark Chapman, and Glenn Phillips.

== Squad ==
- Players with international caps are listed in **bold**.

Washington Freedom roster
Name	Nat.	Date of Birth	Batting Style	Bowling Style	Year signed	Notes
Batters
**Steve Smith**	Australia	June 2, 1989 (age 37)	Right-handed	Right-arm leg spin	2024	Direct signing
**Travis Head**	Australia	December 29, 1993 (age 32)	Left-handed	Right-arm-off spin	2024	Direct signing
Jack Edwards	Australia	April 19, 2000 (age 26)	Right-handed	—N/a	2024	Direct signing
**Mukhtar Ahmed**	Pakistan	December 20, 1992 (age 33)	Right-handed	Right-arm leg break googly	2023	
All-rounders
**Mitchell Owen**	Australia	11 September 2001 (age 25)	Right-handed	Right-arm medium	2025	
**Glenn Maxwell**	Australia	October 14, 1988 (age 37)	Right-handed	Right-arm off break	2024	Direct signing
**Rachin Ravindra**	New Zealand	November 18, 1999 (age 26)	Left-handed	Slow left-arm orthodox	2024	Direct signing
**Glenn Phillips**	New Zealand	December 6, 1996 (age 29)	Right-handed	Right-arm off break	2025	Direct signing
Obus Pienaar	United States	December 12, 1989 (age 36)	Right-handed	Left-arm off spin	2023	
Justin Dill	United States	November 10, 1994 (age 31)	Right-handed	Right-arm medium fast	2023	
**Ian Holland**	United States	October 3, 1990 (age 36)	Right-handed	Right-arm medium	2024	
Wicket-keeper
**Andries Gous**	United States	November 24, 1993 (age 32)	Right-handed		2023	
Lahiru Milantha	Sri Lanka	May 28, 1994 (age 32)	Left-handed		2024	
Bowlers
**Saurabh Netravalkar**	United States	October 16, 1991 (age 34)	Right-handed	Left-arm medium fast	2023	
**Jason Behrendorff**	Australia	20 April 1990	Right-handed	Left-arm fast	2025	Direct signing
**Lockie Ferguson**	New Zealand	June 13, 1991 (age 35)	Right-handed	Right-arm fast	2024	Direct signing
Akhilesh Bodugum	United States	April 28, 2000 (age 26)	Right-handed	Right-arm off spin	2023	U23 player
**Amila Aponso**	United States	June 23, 1993 (age 33)	Right-handed	Slow left-arm orthodox	2024	
**Yasir Mohammad**	United States	October 10, 2002 (age 23)	Left-handed	Legbreak Googly	2024	

== League stage ==
Match 1
June 12, 2025
18:00 (D/N)
Scorecard

San Francisco Unicorns; 269/5 (20 overs)	v	Washington Freedom; 146 (13.1 overs)
Finn Allen 151 (51); Jack Edwards 2/39 (4 overs)		Rachin Ravindra 42 (17); Haris Rauf 3/30 (3.1 overs)

San Francisco Unicorns won by 123 runs
Oakland Coliseum, Oakland
Attendance: 5,126
Umpires: Leslie Reifer (WI) and Rushane Samuels (WI)
Player of the match: Finn Allen (San Francisco Unicorns)

- Washington Freedom won the toss and elected to field.
- Finn Allen (San Francisco Unicorns) scored the fastest century (off 34 balls) in Major League Cricket and also the second-fastest in any franchise T20 league, behind Chris Gayle's 30-ball century against Pune Warriors India in IPL 2013.
- Finn Allen scored the highest number of sixes (19) in innings breaking the record of Chris Gayle (18) in T20s.
- Finn Allen scored the fastest 150 (off 49 balls) in T20s, breaking the record of Dewald Brevis 150 (off 52 balls) against Knights.

Match 4
June 14, 2025
18:00 (D/N)
Scorecard

Seattle Orcas; 145/9 (20 overs)	v	Washington Freedom; 149/5 (13.3 overs)
David Warner 31 (17); Ian Holland 4/19 (4 overs)		Rachin Ravindra 44 (18); Waqar Salamkheil 2/27 (3.3 overs)

Washington Freedom won by 5 wickets
Oakland Coliseum, Oakland
Attendance: 7,361
Umpires: Jermaine Lindo (USA) and Vijaya Mallela (USA)
Player of the match: Ian Holland (Washington Freedom)

- Seattle Orcas won the toss and elected to bat.

Match 8
June 17, 2025
18:00 (D/N)
Scorecard

Washington Freedom; 208/5 (20 overs)	v	Los Angeles Knight Riders; 95 (16.3 overs)
Glenn Maxwell 106* (49); Corné Dry 2/33 (3 overs)		Saif Badar 32 (31); Jack Edwards 3/15 (3 overs)

Washington Freedom won by 113 runs
Oakland Coliseum, Oakland
Attendane: 1,985
Umpires: Wayne Knights (NZ) and Vijaya Mallela (USA)
Player of the match: Glenn Maxwell (Washington Freedom)

- Washington Freedom won the toss and elected to bat.

Match 11
June 21, 2025
19:00 (D/N)
Scorecard

MI New York; 188/4 (20 overs)	v	Washington Freedom; 189/8 (19.2 overs)
Quinton de Kock 55 (34); Ian Holland 1/6 (1 over)		Mitchell Owen 60 (26); Naveen-ul-Haq 2/28 (4 overs)

Washington Freedom won by 2 wickets
Grand Prairie Stadium, Grand Prairie
Umpires: Rushane Samuels (WI) and Wayne Knights (NZ)
Player of the match: Mitchell Owen (Washington Freedom)

- Washington Freedom won the toss and elected to field.

Match 13
June 22, 2025
19:00 (D/N)
Scorecard

Texas Super Kings; 220/6 (20 overs)	v	Washington Freedom; 223/3 (19.4 overs)
Faf du Plessis 69 (31); Mitchell Owen 3/33 (3 overs)		Mitchell Owen 89 (52); Adam Milne 3/42 (4 overs)

Washington Freedom won by 7 wickets
Grand Prairie Stadium, Grand Prairie
Umpires: Wayne Knights (NZ) and Vijaya Mallela (USA)
Player of the match: Mitchell Owen (Washington Freedom)

- Washington Freedom won the toss and elected to field.
- Andries Gous (Washington Freedom) played his 100th T20 match.

Match 17
June 26, 2025
19:00 (D/N)
Scorecard

Los Angeles Knight Riders; 213/4 (20 overs)	v	Washington Freedom; 214/5 (20 overs)
Andre Fletcher 104 (60); Ian Holland 2/25 (3 overs)		Mitchell Owen 43 (16); Tanveer Sangha 2/35 (4 overs)

Washington Freedom won by 5 wickets
Grand Prairie Stadium, Grand Prairie
Umpires: Wayne Knights (NZ) and Vijaya Mallela (USA)
Player of the match: Mitchell Owen (Washington Freedom)

- Washington Freedom won the toss and elected to field.
- Andre Fletcher and Sherfane Rutherford (Los Angeles Knight Riders) both scored their 8,000th and 3,000th run respectively in T20s.

Match 19
June 28, 2025
15:00
Scorecard

Washington Freedom; 169/6 (20 overs)	v	San Francisco Unicorns; 157/9 (20 overs)
Glenn Phillips 58 (39); Xavier Bartlett 4/32 (4 overs)		Matthew Short 67 (40); Mitchell Owen 5/17 (3 overs)

Washington Freedom won by 12 runs
Grand Prairie Stadium, Grand Prairie
Umpires: Wayne Knights (NZ) and Rushane Samuels (WI)
Player of the match: Mitchell Owen (Washington Freedom)

- Washington Freedom won the toss and elected to bat.
- Mitchell Owen (Washington Freedom) took his first five-wicket haul in T20s.

Match 23
July 2, 2025
19:00 (D/N)
Scorecard

Texas Super Kings; 87/2 (5 overs)	v	Washington Freedom; 44/4 (5 overs)
Shubham Ranjane 39* (14); Saurabh Netravalkar 1/30 (2 overs)		Glenn Phillips 18* (11); Nandre Burger 2/12 (1 over)

Texas Super Kings won by 43 runs
Broward County Stadium, Lauderhill
Umpires: Wayne Knights (NZ) and Rushane Samuels (WI)
Player of the match: Donovan Ferreira (Texas Super Kings)

- Washington Freedom won the toss and elected to field.
- The match was reduced to 5 overs per side due to rain.

Match 26
July 4, 2025
19:00 (D/N)
Scorecard

Seattle Orcas; 82 (17.4 overs)	v	Washington Freedom; 86/2 (9.2 overs)
Heinrich Klaasen 48 (39); Glenn Maxwell 3/12 (4 overs)		Mukhtar Ahmed 36* (21); Jessy Singh 1/11 (1 over)

Washington Freedom won by 8 wickets
Broward County Stadium, Lauderhill
Umpires: Jermaine Lindo (USA) and Vijaya Mallela (USA)
Player of the match: Glenn Maxwell (Washington Freedom)

- Washington Freedom won toss and elected to field.

Match 29
July 6, 2025
15:00
Scorecard

MI New York; 112/8 (18 overs)	v	Washington Freedom; 113/4 (15 overs)
Kunwarjeet Singh 33 (30); Glenn Maxwell 3/29 (4 overs)		Andries Gous 46* (34); Tristan Luus 2/39 (4 overs)

Washington Freedom won by 6 wickets
Broward County Stadium, Lauderhill
Umpires: Wayne Knights (NZ) and Billy Taylor (USA)
Player of the match: Glenn Maxwell (Washington Freedom)

- MI New York won the toss and elected to bat.
- The match was reduced to 18 overs per side due to rain.

== Standings ==
=== Points table ===
Pos	Team	Pld	W	L	T	NR	Pts	NRR	Qualification
1	Washington Freedom	10	8	2	0	0	16	0.954	Advanced to Qualifier
2	Texas Super Kings	10	7	3	0	0	14	1.603	Advanced to Qualifier
3	San Francisco Unicorns	10	7	3	0	0	14	1.330	Advanced to Eliminator
4	MI New York (C)	10	3	7	0	0	6	−0.518	Advanced to Eliminator
5	Seattle Orcas	10	3	7	0	0	6	−1.842	Eliminated
6	Los Angeles Knight Riders	10	2	8	0	0	4	−1.320	Eliminated

Source: ESPNCricinfo
(C) Champions

=== Match summary ===
Team	Group matches										Playoffs		
Team	1	2	3	4	5	6	7	8	9	10	Q/E	C	F
Washington Freedom	0	2	4	6	8	10	12	12	14	16	W		L

Win	Loss	Tie	No Result

=== Win–loss table ===
Team	League stage										Play-offs				Pos.
Team	1	2	3	4	5	6	7	8	9	10	Q	E	C	F	Pos.
Washington; Freedom	San Francisco; 123 runs	Seattle; 8 wickets	Los Angeles; 113 runs	New York; 2 wickets	Texas; 8 wickets	Los Angeles; 5 wickets	San Francisco; 12 runs	Texas; 43 runs	Seattle; 8 wickets	New York; 6 wickets	Texas; Higher seeding			New York; 5 runs	2nd

== Administration and support staff ==
Washington Freedom staff
Position	Name
Head coach	(Australia) Ricky Ponting
General Manager	(Australia) Michael Klinger
Bowling coach	(South Africa) Dale Steyn
Assistant coach	(England) Samit Patel
Team manager	(England) Andrew Lynch
Strength and conditioning	(Pakistan) Umar Gul
High performance analyst	(Afghanistan) Zamir Khan
Physiotherapist	(Afghanistan) Noor Ali Zadran
