= 2024 Washington Freedom season =

Washington Freedom
2024 season
- Coach: Ricky Ponting
- Captain: Steve Smith
- Overseas player: Steven Smith; Rachin Ravindra; Marco Jansen; Glenn Maxwell; Travis Head; Lockie Ferguson; Andrew Tye; Jack Edwards; Akeal Hosein
- Ground(s): Grand Prairie Stadium
- League stage: 1st
- MLC finals: Champions
- Most runs: Steve Smith (336)
- Most wickets: Saurabh Netravalkar (15)

The 2024 Washington Freedom season was the second season of the Washington Freedom franchise in Major League Cricket (MLC). The team was captained by Steve Smith and coached by Ricky Ponting.

Ahead of the 2024 season, previous head coach Greg Shipperd resigned and Ricky Ponting was appointed as the new head coach. Moises Henriques, who had captained the team in 2023, was not retained for the 2024 season, with Steve Smith appointed as the new captain.

Washington Freedom finished the league stage at the top of the table and qualified directly for the Qualifier. They defeated San Francisco Unicorns in the Qualifier to reach the final, where they defeated San Francisco Unicorns to win their first MLC title.

== Background ==
In December 2023, it was announced that the second season of the tournament would begin on July 5, 2024, four days after the conclusion of the 2024 ICC Men's T20 World Cup. The team entered the season following a third-place finish in the inaugural 2023 Major League Cricket season, where they were eliminated by Seattle Orcas in the Eliminator.

On February 15, 2024, Washington Freedom retained overseas players Marco Jansen and Akeal Hosein. On March 1, the Freedom retained several domestic players, including Mukhtar Ahmed, Akhilesh Bodugum, Justin Dill, Andries Gous, Saurabh Netravalkar and Obus Pienaar.

The Freedom made several overseas signings ahead of the 2024 season, including Rachin Ravindra, Steve Smith, Travis Head, Glenn Maxwell, Lockie Ferguson, Andrew Tye and Jack Edwards.

== Squad ==
- Players with international caps are listed in **bold**.

Washington Freedom 2024 roster
Name	Nat.	Date of Birth	Batting Style	Bowling Style	Year signed	Notes
Batters
**Steve Smith**	Australia	June 2, 1989 (age 37)	Right-handed	Right-arm leg spin	2024	Direct signing
**Travis Head**	Australia	December 29, 1993 (age 32)	Left-handed	Right-arm-off spin	2024	Direct signing
Jack Edwards	Australia	April 19, 2000 (age 26)	Right-handed	—N/a	2024	Direct signing
**Mukhtar Ahmed**	Pakistan	December 20, 1992 (age 33)	Right-handed	Right-arm leg break googly	2023	
All-rounders
**Mitchell Owen**	Australia	11 September 2001 (age 25)	Right-handed	Right-arm medium	2025	
**Glenn Maxwell**	Australia	October 14, 1988 (age 37)	Right-handed	Right-arm off break	2024	Direct signing
**Rachin Ravindra**	New Zealand	November 18, 1999 (age 26)	Left-handed	Slow left-arm orthodox	2024	Direct signing
**Glenn Phillips**	New Zealand	December 6, 1996 (age 29)	Right-handed	Right-arm off break	2025	Direct signing
Obus Pienaar	United States	December 12, 1989 (age 36)	Right-handed	Left-arm off spin	2023	
Justin Dill	United States	November 10, 1994 (age 31)	Right-handed	Right-arm medium fast	2023	
**Ian Holland**	United States	October 3, 1990 (age 35)	Right-handed	Right-arm medium	2024	
Wicket-keeper
**Andries Gous**	United States	November 24, 1993 (age 32)	Right-handed		2023	
Lahiru Milantha	Sri Lanka	May 28, 1994 (age 32)	Left-handed		2024	
Bowlers
**Saurabh Netravalkar**	United States	October 16, 1991 (age 34)	Right-handed	Left-arm medium fast	2023	
**Jason Behrendorff**	Australia	20 April 1990	Right-handed	Left-arm fast	2025	Direct signing
**Lockie Ferguson**	New Zealand	June 13, 1991 (age 35)	Right-handed	Right-arm fast	2024	Direct signing
Akhilesh Bodugum	United States	April 28, 2000 (age 26)	Right-handed	Right-arm off spin	2023	U23 player
**Amila Aponso**	United States	June 23, 1993 (age 33)	Right-handed	Slow left-arm orthodox	2024	
**Yasir Mohammad**	United States	October 10, 2002 (age 23)	Left-handed	Legbreak Googly	2024	

== Standing ==
=== Points table ===
Pos	Team	Pld	W	L	NR	Pts	NRR	Qualification
1	Washington Freedom (C)	7	5	1	1	11	1.891	Advanced to Qualifier
2	San Francisco Unicorns	7	5	1	1	11	0.588	Advanced to Qualifier
3	Texas Super Kings	7	3	2	2	8	0.604	Advanced to Eliminator
4	MI New York	7	2	4	1	5	−0.451	Advanced to Eliminator
5	Los Angeles Knight Riders	7	2	4	1	5	−0.710	
6	Seattle Orcas	7	1	6	0	2	−1.312	

Source: ESPNCricinfo
(C) Champions

=== Match summary ===
Team	Group matches										Playoffs		
Team	1	2	3	4	5	6	7	8	9	10	Q/E	C	F
Washington Freedom	0	2	4	6	8	10	12	12	14	16	W		L

Win	Loss	Tie	No Result

== Playoffs ==
Qualifier
July 25, 2024 – Dallas
1	Washington Freedom	149/3 (15.3 overs)
2	San Francisco Unicorns	145 (19 overs)
Eliminator
July 24, 2024 – Dallas
3	Texas Super Kings	167/1 (18.3 overs)
4	MI New York	163/8 (20 overs)

Challenger
July 26, 2024 – Dallas
QL	San Francisco Unicorns	200/6 (20 overs)
EW	Texas Super Kings	190/4 (20 overs)

Final
July 28, 2024 – Dallas
QW	Washington Freedom	207/5 (20 overs)
CW	San Francisco Unicorns	111 (16 overs)

=== Qualifier ===
July 25, 2024
7:30 PM (N)
Scorecard

San Francisco Unicorns; 145 (19 overs)	v	Washington Freedom; 149/3 (15.3 overs)
Hassan Khan 57 (36); Rachin Ravindra 4/11 (2.4 overs)		Travis Head 77* (44); Hassan Khan 2/32 (4 overs)

Washington Freedom won by 7 wickets
Grand Prairie Stadium, Dallas
Umpires: Gregory Brathwaite (WI) and Vijaya Mallela (USA)
Player of the match: Travis Head (Washington Freedom)

- Washington Freedom won the toss and elected to field.

== Final ==
July 28, 2024
7:30 PM (N)
Scorecard

Washington Freedom; 207/5 (20 overs)	v	San Francisco Unicorns; 111 (16 overs)
Steve Smith 88 (52); Pat Cummins 2/35 (4 overs)		Carmi le Roux 20* (19); Rachin Ravindra 3/23 (4 overs)

Washington Freedom won by 96 runs
Grand Prairie Stadium, Dallas
Umpires: Gregory Brathwaite (WI) and Marais Erasmus (SA)
Player of the match: Steve Smith (Washington Freedom)

- San Francisco Unicorns won the toss and elected to field.

== Administration and support staff ==
Washington Freedom staff
Position	Name
Head coach	(Australia) Ricky Ponting
General Manager	(Australia) Michael Klinger
Bowling coach	(South Africa) Dale Steyn
Assistant coach	(England) Samit Patel
Team manager	(England) Andrew Lynch
Strength and conditioning	(Pakistan) Umar Gul
High performance analyst	(Afghanistan) Zamir Khan
Physiotherapist	(Afghanistan) Noor Ali Zadran
