= 2023 Washington Freedom season =

Washington Freedom
2023 season
- Coach: Greg Shipperd
- Captain: Moises Henriques
- Overseas player: Anrich Nortje; Marco Jansen; Glenn Phillips; Adam Milne; Josh Philippe; Ben Dwarshuis; Akeal Hosein; Tanveer Sangha
- Ground(s): Grand Prairie Stadium
- League stage: 3rd
- MLC finals: Eliminator
- Most runs: Matthew Short (152)
- Most wickets: Saurabh Netravalkar (10)

The 2023 Washington Freedom season was the inaugural season of the Washington Freedom franchise in Major League Cricket (MLC). The team was one of six franchises that competed in the inaugural MLC season. The team was captained by Moises Henriques and coached by Greg Shipperd.

Steve Smith joined Washington Freedom as the team's brand ambassador.

Washington Freedom began their inaugural MLC campaign with a five-wicket defeat to the Seattle Orcas. The team subsequently recorded victories over the Texas Super Kings, Los Angeles Knight Riders and San Francisco Unicorns, finishing the league stage with a 3–3 record.

The Freedom qualified for the playoffs, where they faced MI New York in the Eliminator on July 27. Washington Freedom scored 126 runs in their allotted overs in pursuit of New York's 141/7 and lost by 16 runs, ending their inaugural season.

== Background ==
The Freedom's 2023 squad included international players such as Anrich Nortje, Marco Jansen, Glenn Phillips, Adam Milne, Josh Philippe, Ben Dwarshuis, Akeal Hosein and Matthew Short, alongside United States and domestic players including Saurabh Netravalkar, Andries Gous, Mukhtar Ahmed and Obus Pienaar.

Tanveer Sangha has signed as a replacement for Wanindu Hasaranga.

== Squad ==
- Players with international caps are listed in **bold**.

Washington Freedom 2023 roster
Name	Nat.	Date of Birth	Batting Style	Bowling Style	Year signed	Notes
Batters
**Matthew Short**	Australia	August 8, 1995 (age 31)	Right-handed	Right-arm off break	2023	Injury replacement
**Mukhtar Ahmed**	Pakistan	December 20, 1992 (age 33)	Right-handed	Right-arm leg break googly	2023	Draft selection
Saad Ali	Pakistan	October 1, 1993 (age 33)	Left-handed	Right-arm medium	2023	Draft selection
Sujith Gowda	United States	April 25, 1999 (age 27)	Right-handed	Right-arm off break	2023	Draft selection
All-rounders
**Moises Henriques**	Australia	February 1, 1987 (age 39)	Right-handed	Right-arm medium	2023	Direct signing; captain
Obus Pienaar	United States	December 12, 1989 (age 36)	Right-handed	Left-arm off spin	2023	Draft selection
**Marco Jansen**	South Africa	May 1, 2000 (age 26)	Left-handed	Left-arm fast-medium	2023	Direct signing
**Glenn Phillips**	New Zealand	December 6, 1996 (age 29)	Right-handed	Right-arm off break	2023	Direct signing
**Akeal Hosein**	West Indies	April 25, 1993 (age 33)	Left-handed	Slow left-arm orthodox	2023	Direct signing
Justin Dill	United States	November 10, 1994 (age 31)	Right-handed	Right-arm medium-fast	2023	Draft selection
Wicket-keepers
Andries Gous	United States	November 24, 1993 (age 32)	Right-handed		2023	Draft selection
**Josh Philippe**	Australia	June 1, 1997 (age 29)	Right-handed		2023	Direct signing
Bowlers
**Saurabh Netravalkar**	United States	October 16, 1991 (age 35)	Right-handed	Left-arm medium-fast	2023	Draft selection
**Anrich Nortje**	South Africa	November 16, 1993 (age 32)	Right-handed	Right-arm fast	2023	Direct signing
**Adam Milne**	New Zealand	April 13, 1992 (age 34)	Right-handed	Right-arm fast	2023	Direct signing
**Ben Dwarshuis**	Australia	June 23, 1994 (age 32)	Left-handed	Left-arm fast-medium	2023	Direct signing
Dane Piedt	United States	October 6, 1990 (age 36)	Right-handed	Right-arm off break	2023	Draft selection
**Tanveer Sangha**	Australia	November 26, 2001 (age 24)	Right-handed	Right-arm leg break	2023	Replacement for Wanindu Hasaranga
Akhilesh Bodugum	United States	April 28, 2000 (age 26)	Right-handed	Right-arm off break	2023	U23 player
Usman Rafiq	United States	August 24, 1990 (age 36)	Right-handed	Right-arm off break	2023	
**Wanindu Hasaranga**	Sri Lanka	July 29, 1997 (age 29)	Right-handed	Right-arm leg break	2023	Withdrew

== League stage ==
Match 3
July 14, 2023
19:30 (N)
Scorecard

Washington Freedom; 144/7 (20 overs)	v	Seattle Orcas; 148/5 (19.4 overs)
Akeal Hosein 33* (22); Harmeet Singh 2/24 (4 overs)		Nauman Anwar 48 (37); Moises Henriques 1/8 (2 overs)

Seattle Orcas won by 5 wickets
Grand Prairie Stadium, Texas
Umpires: Wayne Knights (NZ) and Rushane Samuels (WI)
Player of the match: Imad Wasim (Seattle Orcas)

- Seattle Orcas won the toss and elected to field.

Match 5
July 16, 2023
15:30 (D/N)
Scorecard

Washington Freedom; 163/5 (20 overs)	v	Texas Super Kings; 157/7 (20 overs)
Matthew Short 80 (50); Gerald Coetzee 2/26 (4 overs)		Dwayne Bravo 76* (39); Akeal Hosein 2/25 (4 overs)

Washington Freedom won by 6 runs
Grand Prairie Stadium, Texas
Umpires: Jermaine Lindo (USA) and Paul Wilson (Aus)
Player of the match: Matthew Short (Washington Freedom)

- Washington Freedom won the toss and elected to bat.

Match 9
July 20, 2023
17:30 (D/N)
Scorecard

Los Angeles Knight Riders; 175/7 (20 overs)	v	Washington Freedom; 177/4 (18.1 overs)
Andre Russell 70* (37); Moises Henriques 3/26 (3 overs)		Matthew Short 43 (35); Sunil Narine 1/20 (4 overs)

Washington Freedom won by 6 wickets
Church Street Park, Morrisville
Umpires: Billy Taylor (Eng) and Paul Wilson (Aus)
Player of the match: Andre Russell (Los Angeles Knight Riders)

- Washington Freedom won the toss elected to field.
- Los Angeles Knight Riders were eliminated as a result of this match.

Match 11
July 22, 2023
17:30 (D/N)
Scorecard

Washington Freedom; 133/8 (20 overs)	v	San Francisco Unicorns; 103 (19.5 overs)
Moises Henriques 30 (27); Haris Rauf 3/20 (4 overs)		Corey Anderson 34 (34); Saurabh Netravalkar 6/9 (3.5 overs)

Washington Freedom won by 30 runs
Church Street Park, Morrisville
Umpires: Rushane Samuels (WI) and Paul Wilson (Aus)
Player of the match: Saurabh Netravalkar (Washington Freedom)

- San Francisco Unicorns won the toss and elected to field.
- Washington Freedom qualified for the play-offs as a result of this match.

Match 13
July 23, 2023
17:30 (D/N)
Scorecard

Washington Freedom; 160/6 (20 overs)	v	MI New York; 161/2 (15.3 overs)
Glenn Phillips 47 (35); Kieron Pollard 2/33 (4 overs)		Nicholas Pooran 62* (33); Akeal Hosein 1/9 (2 overs)

MI New York won by 8 wickets
Church Street Park, Morrisville
Umpires: Aleem Dar (Pak) and Paul Wilson (Aus)
Player of the match: Nicholas Pooran (MI New York)

- MI New York won the toss and elected to field.

== Standing ==
=== Points table ===
Pos	Team	Pld	W	L	NR	Pts	NRR	Qualification
1	Seattle Orcas	5	4	1	0	8	0.725	Advanced to Qualifier
2	Texas Super Kings	5	3	2	0	6	0.570	Advanced to Qualifier
3	Washington Freedom	5	3	2	0	6	0.097	Advanced to Eliminator
4	MI New York (C)	5	2	3	0	4	1.004	Advanced to Eliminator
5	San Francisco Unicorns	5	2	3	0	4	−0.303	
6	Los Angeles Knight Riders	5	1	4	0	2	−2.028	

Source: ESPNcricinfo
(C) Champions

=== Match summary ===
Team	Group matches					Playoffs		
Team	1	2	3	4	5	Q/E	C	F
Washington Freedom	0	2	4	6	6	L		

Win	Loss	Tie	No Result

== Playoffs ==
Eliminator
July 27, 2023
15:30 (D/N)
Scorecard

MI New York; 141/7 (20 overs)	v	Washington Freedom; 125/9 (20 overs)
Dewald Brevis 57 (41); Saurabh Netravalkar 2/25 (4 overs)		Marco Jansen 28 (18); Trent Boult 4/20 (4 overs)

MI New York won by 16 runs
Grand Prairie Stadium, Texas
Umpires: Aleem Dar (Pak) and Rushane Samuels (WI)
Player of the match: Dewald Brevis (MI New York)

- Washington Freedom won the toss and elected to field.

== Administration and support staff ==
Washington Freedom staff
Position	Name
Head coach	(Australia) Greg Shipperd
Bowling coach	(South Africa) Dale Steyn
