= 2026 Major League Cricket final =

Cricket match

- Event: 2026 Major League Cricket
Los Angeles Knight Riders	Washington Freedom
164	163/9
19.4 overs	20 overs
- Los Angeles Knight Riders won by 1 run
- Date: July 18, 2026
- Venue: Oakland Coliseum, Oakland
- Player of the match: Sunil Narine (Los Angeles Knight Riders)
- Umpires: Gregory Brathwaite (WI) and Wayne Knights (NZ)
- Attendance: 11,000

The 2026 Major League Cricket final was a day/night 20-over cricket match that was played on July 18, 2026, at Oakland Coliseum in Oakland between the Los Angeles Knight Riders and the Washington Freedom to determine the winner of the fourth season of Major League Cricket.

In the final, Los Angeles Knight Riders defeated Washington Freedom by 1 run to win their first Major League Cricket title, with Sunil Narine named both player of the match and player of the tournament for the 2026 season.

== Background ==
The complete schedule for the tournament's fourth season was unveiled on March 20, 2026. The competition retained the format used during the 2025 season, consisting of a 30-match double round-robin stage followed by four playoff fixtures to total 34 matches.

The tournament introduced a new venue, the Knight Riders Cricket Field situated at Fairplex in Pomona, California, which took the place of Broward County Stadium in Lauderhill, Florida. The tournament concluded at the Oakland Coliseum, which hosted the championship final on July 18, 2026.

== Road to the final ==
All the top three teams San Francisco Unicorns, Los Angeles Knight Riders, Washington Freedom finished the league stage with 6 wins, 4 losses equal on 12 points.

Los Angeles Knight Riders finished second due to inferior run rate than San Francisco Unicorns. In Qualifier, Los Angeles Knight Riders beat San Francisco Unicorns and progressed to the final.

Washington Freedom had the worst run rate of the top three teams and finished third. In Eliminator, they beat MI New York and in the Challenger they beat San Francisco Unicorns and progressed to the final.

Los Angeles Knight Riders			Matches	Washington Freedom
League Stage
Opponent	Date	Result	Titles	Opponent	Date	Result
San Francisco Unicorns	June 19, 2026	Won	Match 1	Seattle Orcas	June 19, 2026	Lost
Seattle Orcas	June 21, 2026	Won	Match 2	MI New York	June 20, 2026	Won
MI New York	June 27, 2026	Lost	Match 3	Seattle Orcas	June 25, 2026	Lost
Seattle Orcas	June 28, 2026	Lost	Match 4	Texas Super Kings	June 27, 2026	Won
Washington Freedom	July 1, 2026	Lost	Match 5	San Francisco Unicorns	June 28, 2026	Lost
Texas Super Kings	July 3, 2026	Won	Match 6	Los Angeles Knight Riders	July 1, 2026	Won
MI New York	July 4, 2026	Lost	Match 7	San Francisco Unicorns	July 4, 2026	Won
Washington Freedom	July 9, 2026	Won	Match 8	Los Angeles Knight Riders	July 9, 2026	Lost
San Francisco Unicorns	July 10, 2026	Won	Match 9	Texas Super Kings	July 11, 2026	Won
Texas Super Kings	July 12, 2026	Won	Match 10	MI New York	July 12, 2026	Won
Playoff stage
Qualifier				Eliminator
Opponent	Date	Result	Titles	Opponent	Date	Result
San Francisco Unicorns	July 15, 2026	Won	Match 11	MI New York	July 15, 2026	Won
				Challenger
			Titles	Opponent	Date	Result
			Match 12	San Francisco Unicorns	July 16, 2026	Won
2026 Major Cricket League final

== Match ==
=== Match officials ===
- On-field umpires: Gregory Brathwaite (WI) and Wayne Knights (NZ)
- Third umpire: Paul Wilson (Aus)
- Reserve umpire: Rushane Samuels (WI)
- Match referee: Simon Taufel (Aus)
- Toss: Washington Freedom won the toss and elected to field.

=== Scorecard ===
Final
July 18, 2026
16:30 (D/N)
Scorecard

Los Angeles Knight Riders; 164 (19.4 overs)	v	Washington Freedom; 163/9 (20 overs)
Andre Fletcher 47 (27); Ben Dwarshuis 3/31 (4 overs)		Obus Pienaar 53 (24); Sunil Narine 3/13 (4 overs)

Los Angeles Knight Riders won by 1 run
Oakland Coliseum, Oakland
Attendance: 11,000
Umpires: Gregory Brathwaite (WI) and Wayne Knights (NZ)
Player of the match: Sunil Narine (Los Angeles Knight Riders)

- Washington Freedom won the toss and elected to field.
- Los Angeles Knight Riders won their maiden title after 4 years.
