= 2024 Major League Cricket final =

Cricket match

- Event: 2024 Major League Cricket season
Washington Freedom	San Francisco Unicorns
207/5	111
20 overs	16 overs
- Washington Freedom won by 96 runs
- Date: July 28, 2024
- Venue: Grand Prairie Stadium, Grand Prairie
- Player of the match: Steve Smith (Washington Freedom)
- Umpires: Gregory Brathwaite (West Indies); Marais Erasmus (South Africa)

The 2024 Major League Cricket final was a day/night 20-over cricket match that was played on July 28, 2024, at Grand Prairie Stadium in Grand Prairie, Texas between the Washington Freedom and the San Francisco Unicorns to determine the winner of the second season of Major League Cricket. The Washington Freedom won the match and the title by defeating the San Francisco Unicorns by 96 runs. Washington Freedom captain, Steve Smith, was named man of the match for his 52-ball 88.

== Background ==
On May 7, 2024, the schedule for the 2024 season of Major League Cricket was released. 2 venues, Grand Prairie Stadium in Grand Prairie, Texas and Church Street Park in Morrisville, North Carolina were scheduled to host the games. The play-off schedule was announced on the same day, with Grand Prairie due to host all play-off matches. Later that month, MLC announced that they had obtained official List A status for all tournament fixtures, becoming the second Associate-run league to have it alongside the ILT20.

== Road to the final ==
Washington Freedom			Matches	San Francisco Unicorns
League Stage
Opponent	Scorecard	Result	Titles	Opponent	Scorecard	Result
MI New York	July 6, 2024	Won (D/L)	Match 1	Los Angeles Knight Riders	July 7, 2024	Won
Texas Super Kings	July 8, 2024	N/R	Match 2	Texas Super Kings	July 10, 2024	Lost
Seattle Orcas	July 11, 2024	Won	Match 3	Los Angeles Knight Riders	July 13, 2024	N/R
Los Angeles Knight Riders	July 14, 2024	Won	Match 4	Seattle Orcas	July 15, 2024	Won
MI New York	July 16, 2024	Won	Match 5	MI New York	July 18, 2024	Won
Texas Super Kings	July 19, 2024	Won	Match 6	Seattle Orcas	July 20, 2024	Won
San Francisco Unicorns	July 22, 2024	Lost (D/L)	Match 7	Washington Freedom	July 22, 2024	Won (D/L)
Playoff stage
Eliminator
Opponent	Scorecard	Result	Titles	Opponent	Scorecard	Result
			Match 8
Qualifier
Opponent	Scorecard	Result	Titles	Opponent	Scorecard	Result
San Francisco Unicorns	July 25, 2024	Won	Match 9	Washington Freedom	July 25, 2024	Lost
Challenger
Opponent	Scorecard	Result	Titles	Opponent	Scorecard	Result
			Match 10	Texas Super Kings	July 26, 2024	Won
2024 Major League Cricket final

=== Playoffs ===
Eliminator
July 24, 2024
19:30 (N)
Scorecard

MI New York; 163/8 (20 overs)	v	Texas Super Kings (H); 167/1 (18.3 overs)
Rashid Khan 55 (30); Marcus Stoinis 2/18 (4 overs)		Faf du Plessis 72 (47); Nosthush Kenjige 1/24 (3 overs)

Texas Super Kings won by 9 wickets
Grand Prairie Stadium, Dallas
Umpires: Marais Erasmus (SA) and Rushane Samuels (WI)
Player of the match: Faf du Plessis (Texas Super Kings)

- Texas Super Kings won the toss and elected to field.

Qualifier
July 25, 2024
19:30 (N)
Scorecard

San Francisco Unicorns; 145 (19 overs)	v	Washington Freedom; 149/3 (15.3 overs)
Hassan Khan 57 (36); Rachin Ravindra 4/11 (2.4 overs)		Travis Head 77* (44); Hassan Khan 2/32 (4 overs)

Washington Freedom won by 7 wickets
Grand Prairie Stadium, Dallas
Umpires: Gregory Brathwaite (WI) and Vijaya Mallela (USA)
Player of the match: Travis Head (Washington Freedom)

- Washington Freedom won the toss and elected to field.

Challenger
July 26, 2024
19:30 (N)
Scorecard

San Francisco Unicorns; 200/6 (20 overs)	v	Texas Super Kings (H); 190/4 (20 overs)
Finn Allen 101 (53); Noor Ahmad 3/27 (4 overs)		Devon Conway 62* (38); Juanoy Drysdale 2/33 4 overs)

San Francisco Unicorns won by 10 runs
Grand Prairie Stadium, Dallas
Umpires: Marais Erasmus (SA) and Billy Taylor (USA)
Player of the match: Finn Allen (San Francisco Unicorns)

- Texas Super Kings won the toss and elected to field.

== Match ==
=== Match officials ===
- On-field umpires: Gregory Brathwaite (WI) and Marais Erasmus (SA)
- Third umpire: Paul Wilson (Aus)
- Reserve umpire: Rushane Samuels (WI)
- Match referee: Simon Taufel (Aus)
- Toss: San Francisco Unicorns won the toss and elected to field.

=== Scorecard ===
Final
July 28, 2024
19:30 (N)
Scorecard

Washington Freedom; 207/5 (20 overs)	v	San Francisco Unicorns; 111 (16 overs)
Steve Smith 88 (52); Pat Cummins 2/35 (4 overs)		Carmi le Roux 20* (19); Rachin Ravindra 3/23 (4 overs)

Washington Freedom won by 96 runs
Grand Prairie Stadium, Texas
Umpires: Gregory Brathwaite (WI) and Marais Erasmus (SA)
Player of the match: Steve Smith (Washington Freedom)

- San Francisco Unicorns won the toss and elected to field.
