= 2025 Major League Cricket final =

Cricket match

- Event: 2025 Major League Cricket season
Washington Freedom	MI New York
175/5	180/7
20 overs	20 overs
- MI New York won by 5 runs
- Date: July 13, 2025
- Venue: Grand Prairie Stadium, Grand Prairie
- Player of the match: Rushil Ugarkar (MI New York)
- Umpires: Wayne Knights (New Zealand); Leslie Reifer (West Indies)

The 2025 Major League Cricket final was a day/night 20-over cricket match that played on July 13, 2025, at Grand Prairie Stadium in Grand Prairie, Texas between the Washington Freedom and the MI New York to determine the winner of the third season of Major League Cricket.

== Background ==
In May 2024, MLC announced plans to expand its season from 19 games to 34 by its third season. By January 2025, amidst concerns that the league's schedule would overlap with other T20 leagues like The Hundred, MLC announced that their season would run from mid-June to July, thereby avoiding conflict. A full schedule would be released in March, following the season's annual domestic draft.

The domestic draft, which was held in February 2025, saw a number of top players released by teams – key amongst them being Pat Cummins and Travis Head.

== Road to the final ==
Washington Freedom ranked first in the league stage with 8 wins, 2 losses allocating a total of 16 points. Their match against Texas Super kings in Qualifier washed out due to rain and qualified for the final.

MI New York ranked fourth in the league stage with 3 wins, 7 losses allocating just 6 points. MI New York and Seattle Orcas both have 6 points each in the league stage as MI New York qualified for the play-offs due to superior run-rate. They won their San Francisco Unicorns in the eliminator by 2 wickets and in the challenger against Texas Super Kings by 7 wickets booking their place in the final.

== Match ==
=== Match officials ===
- On-field umpires: Wayne Knights (NZ) and Leslie Reifer (WI)
- Third umpire: Paul Wilson (Aus)
- Reserve umpire: Jermaine Lindo (USA)
- Match referee: Simon Taufel (Aus)
- Toss: Washington Freedom won the toss and elected to field.

=== Scorecard ===
Final
July 13, 2025
19:00 (D/N)
Scorecard

MI New York; 180/7 (20 overs)	v	Washington Freedom; 175/5 (20 overs)
Quinton de Kock 77 (46); Lockie Ferguson 3/21 (4 overs)		Rachin Ravindra 70 (41); Trent Boult 2/32 (4 overs); Rushil Ugarkar 2/32 (4 overs)

MI New York won by 5 runs
Grand Prairie Stadium, Grand Prairie
Player of the match: Rushil Ugarkar (MI New York)
