= Washington Freedom =

Washington Freedom may refer to:

- Washington Freedom (cricket)
- Washington Freedom (soccer)
