= The Hundred (cricket) =

British professional cricket league

- Tournament logo
- Countries: England and Wales
- Administrator: England and Wales Cricket Board
- Format: 100-ball cricket / T20
- First edition: 2021
- Latest edition: 2026
- Next edition: 2027
- Tournament format: Round-robin league and Play-offs
- Number of teams: Women: 8 Men: 8
- Current champion: Women: Trent Rockets (1st title); Men: Manchester Super Giants (1st title)
- Most successful: Women: MI London (2 titles); Men: MI London (3 titles)
- TV: BBC Sport; Sky Sports
- Website: www.thehundred.com

The Hundred is a professional cricket league in England and Wales. It is the only cricket league in the world that uses the 100-ball cricket format. It is organised by the England and Wales Cricket Board (ECB) and played during July and August each year. The competition is one of the four cricket tournaments organised by the ECB, alongside the County Championship, the One-Day Cup and the T20 Blast. The Hundred comprises eight teams, with seven based in England and one in Wales.

The format was invented with the expectation that each match will last around two-and-a-half hours. The BBC shows free-to-air broadcasts of some of the competition, while all of the women's matches and some of the men's matches were available to stream for free on Sky Sports' YouTube channel.

Almost all matches take place as back-to-back double-headers at the same venue on the same day. One ticket gives access to both the men's and women's games. The men's salaries are four times higher than the women's, but the tournament prize money is equal. For statistical purposes The Hundred is designated as a Twenty20 competition.

== History ==
A new city-based cricket Twenty20 competition was first proposed by the England and Wales Cricket Board (ECB) in September 2016. Following early discussions between the 18 first-class counties, the Professional Cricketers' Association (PCA) and the Marylebone Cricket Club (MCC), those bodies voted 16–3 in favour of developing the competition. On 26 April 2017, members of the ECB voted by 38–3 to push ahead with the new competition.

The idea of switching the competition from the established Twenty20 format to an entirely new type of cricket was first proposed by Sanjay Patel, the ECB's chief commercial officer, in a private October 2017 meeting with senior cricket officials. He argued that the hundred-ball format would be simpler to understand for new audiences that the competition wants to attract.

Former England player and Northern Superchargers head coach Dani Hazell stated that the tournament would help with investment into the women's regional structure and the tournament would be an important learning experience for domestic players.

The tournament was delayed by a year due to the COVID-19 pandemic.

The profitability of The Hundred has been a subject of debate. In 2016, a report produced by Deloitte had predicted the tournament would make about £27m profit per year. The ECB reported in 2022 that The Hundred had made an £11.8m profit. A report produced in 2023 by Fanos Hira, a chartered accountant, and assisted by ECB chairman Richard Thompson, showed a loss of £9m in its first two years. These figures do not include the £24.7m promised to the counties and MCC. The ECB's chief executive Richard Gould said he expected the tournament was "here to stay" beyond the current deal with Sky Sports, which runs until 2028.

For the third season of The Hundred, it was announced that the 100-ball cricket competition would be collaborating with Marvel Comics. A selection of Marvel's characters, such as Hulk, Iron Man and Black Panther featured in digital content with players from across all eight teams to introduce the competition to new audiences.

=== Investment and possible future match format change ===
In 2024, the ECB secured support from county cricket clubs to transfer ownership of the eight franchises away from the ECB, with the host counties (or MCC for London Spirit) given 51% of their franchise, and the ECB retaining 49%, which they would make available to private investors.

The proceeds from the sale of the ECB's 49% stake would see 90% split equally between the 18 counties and the MCC, with 10% going to the recreational game. Any host selling part or all of their 51% stake would see proceeds split in the following way: 80% for the host county, 10% split between the 18 counties and MCC, and 10% for the recreational game.

In September 2024, it was reported the ECB had turned down a £400m offer for 75% of the competition, from Bridgepoint Group, a London-listed buyout firm. In October, MCC held a vote in which its members voted in favour of accepting the ECB's offer.

The process of courting potential investors culminated in the final stage taking place in January 2025. A 49% share in Birmingham Phoenix was sold for approximately £40m to Knighthead Capital, a US investment group including retired NFL quarterback Tom Brady who also own Birmingham City F.C.. On the same day, Oval Invincibles announced that the Ambani family, owners of the Mumbai Indians, had acquired a 49% stake for around £60m.

Sanjay Govil's Washington Freedom bought a 50% stake in Welsh Fire and a consortium of tech billionaires led by Nikesh Arora acquired 49% of London Spirit for £145m.

Lancashire became the first host county to sell part of their stake in their franchise, with 70% of the Manchester Originals going to the RP-Sanjiv Goenka Group, owners of the Mohun Bagan Super Giant and Lucknow Super Giants, for approximately £81m. This transaction established RPSG as the principal stakeholder in the Manchester-based team, with Lancashire County Cricket Club retaining the remaining 30% ownership.

Yorkshire then sold their entire stake in the Northern Superchargers to Sun Group, the owners of Sunrisers Hyderabad, for around £100m. On 11 February 2025, Chelsea co-owner Todd Boehly's Cain agreed to buy a 49% share in Trent Rockets for close to £40m. On February 12, GMR Group, owner of Hampshire Cricket Club, agreed a £48m deal for the ECB's 49% stake in Southern Brave. The sales were finalised in the second half of 2025 leading to Northern Superchargers and Oval Invincibles being rebranded as Sunrisers Leeds and MI London respectively. In August 2025, The Guardian reported that the new IPL-affiliated investors were keen to change the format of The Hundred from 100 ball cricket into a franchise T20 tournament to align with other franchise leagues. Months earlier, in April of the same year, the England and Wales Cricket Board had admitted it was "open to discussions" about changing the format of The Hundred into a franchise T20 cricket tournament. It has been noted by sources such as ESPN that any attempted change of format to The Hundred before 2028 could face objections from BBC Sport and Sky Sports, which are the contracted broadcasters for the tournament.

Ownership structure and team valuations
Team	Established as	Host (equity stake)	Investor (equity stake)	Valuation (£ million)
Birmingham Phoenix		Warwickshire Cricket Club (51%)	Knighthead Capital (49%)	81.63
London Spirit		Marylebone Cricket Club (51%)	Tech Titans (49%)	295.92
Manchester Super Giants	Manchester Originals	Lancashire Cricket Club (30%)	RP-Sanjiv Goenka Group (70%)	115.71
Sunrisers Leeds	Northern Superchargers	Yorkshire Cricket Club (—)	Sun Group (100%)	100.00
MI London	Oval Invincibles	Surrey Cricket Club (51%)	Reliance Industries (49%)	122.45
Southern Brave		Hampshire Cricket Club (51%)	GMR Group (49%)	97.96
Trent Rockets		Nottinghamshire Cricket Club (51%)	Cain & Ares (49%)	81.63
Welsh Fire		Glamorgan Cricket Club (50%)	Washington Freedom (50%)	67.50

== Format ==
One-hundred-ball cricket is a form of limited overs cricket, played by two teams each playing a single innings made up of 100 balls. Games last approximately two and a half hours.

The Laws of Cricket apply in The Hundred, with some major exceptions:

- Law 11 (Intervals):
  - there are two innings, each normally lasting 65 minutes separated by a 15-minute interval
  - if the first innings is completed before the scheduled time of the interval, the interval takes place immediately
  - if the first innings is delayed or interrupted, the interval is shortened to 10 minutes
- Law 12 (Start of play; cessation of play):
  - each team shall bat for 20 overs unless all out earlier
  - the fielding team is entitled to take one 90 second strategic time-out (but not during the first 25 balls of the innings)
- Law 13 (Innings):
  - a match consists of one innings per side, each limited to a maximum of 20 overs with 5 ball overs, but the captain can decide to let them bowl another 5 balls. This, however, counts as 2 overs
  - no bowler may bowl more than four overs in an innings
- Law 17 (The over):
  - an over consists of five balls
  - two overs shall be bowled from each end alternately. Batters shall not change ends between overs
  - a bowler shall be allowed to change ends as often as desired
  - a bowler shall not be allowed to bowl more than 2 consecutive overs
- Law 21 (No ball):
  - the penalty for a no ball is two runs
  - the delivery following a no ball shall be a free hit
- Law 28 (The fielder):
  - there shall not be more than 5 fielders on the leg side
  - for the first five (powerplay) overs, no more than two fielders are permitted to be outside the 30-yard circle
- Law 40 (Timed out):
  - an incoming batter must be ready to receive the next ball within 60 seconds after the dismissal or retirement of the preceding batter
  - in the event of the above requirement not being met, the umpire shall issue one warning
  - if the above requirement is not met for a subsequent time in the same innings, five penalty runs shall be awarded to the fielding team
  - if the batter is not ready within 80 seconds, they will be timed out

== Tournament structure ==
Eight city-based teams compete during the school summer holidays. All men's and women's matches are held on the same day at the same grounds. In total, there are 32 matches in the league stage of the tournament. Each team plays four matches at home and four matches away. This includes one match against every other team and then a second bonus match against their nearest regional rivals.

The team that finishes top of the league progresses straight into the final. The teams finishing second and third compete in the Eliminator (or semi-final), with the winner progressing into the final.

== Trophies ==
The Hundred trophies for both the men's and women's tournaments were designed and made by London-based goldsmiths and silversmiths Thomas Lyte. Originally commissioned in 2019, the two identical trophies were produced simultaneously. They stand at a height of 56 cm and weigh 13 kg. The identical nature of the trophies is symbolic of the ECB's drive for equality in the sport of cricket, with the prize fund for the competition split equally between the men's and women's tournaments.

== Teams ==
Teams in The Hundred
London teams in The Hundred

The naming process of the teams went through several reported changes; the tournament was described by the ECB as the City T20 into 2017, but by 2018 there were rumours the teams would not be named after cities, counties or venues.

In May 2019, six team names were announced, revealing a mix of city and non-city names: Birmingham Phoenix, Leeds Superchargers, London Spirit, Southern Brave, Trent Rockets and Welsh Fire. During the summer, it was announced that the team based at Old Trafford would be the Manchester Originals, the second London team would be known as the Oval Invincibles and Leeds Superchargers had changed their name to Northern Superchargers.

In 2025, the investment from the IPL brought name changes. In August, it was reported that the Originals would become the Manchester Super Giants. In November, it was formally announced that the Superchargers had changed their name to Sunrisers Leeds. In December, the Invincibles became MI London.

Team name	Home ground	Location	Linked counties	Men's captain	Women's captain
Birmingham Phoenix	Edgbaston	Birmingham, West Midlands	Warwickshire, Worcestershire	Donovan Ferreira	Ellyse Perry
London Spirit	Lord's	St John's Wood, London	Essex, Middlesex, Northamptonshire	Liam Livingstone	Charlie Dean
Manchester Super Giants	Old Trafford	Stretford, Greater Manchester	Lancashire	Aiden Markram	Meg Lanning
MI London	The Oval	Kennington, London	Kent, Surrey	Sam Curran	Hollie Armitage
Southern Brave	Rose Bowl	Southampton, Hampshire	Hampshire, Sussex	Chris Jordan	Sophie Molineux
Sunrisers Leeds	Headingley	Leeds, West Yorkshire	Durham, Yorkshire	Zak Crawley	Dani Gibson
Trent Rockets	Trent Bridge	West Bridgford, Nottingham	Derbyshire, Leicestershire, Nottinghamshire	Sam Billings	Ashleigh Gardner
Welsh Fire	Sophia Gardens	Cardiff	Glamorgan, Gloucestershire, Somerset	Phil Salt	Sophie Devine

== Finals ==
Women's finals
Season	Date	Winner	Winning margin	Runner-up	Venue
2021	21 August	Oval Invincibles	48 runs Scorecard	Southern Brave	Lord's, London
2022	3 September	Oval Invincibles	5 wickets Scorecard	Southern Brave	Lord's, London
2023	27 August	Southern Brave	34 runs Scorecard	Northern Superchargers	Lord's, London
2024	18 August	London Spirit	4 wickets Scorecard	Welsh Fire	Lord's, London
2025	31 August	Northern Superchargers	7 wickets Scorecard	Southern Brave	Lord's, London
2026	16 August	Trent Rockets	8 wickets Scorecard	Sunrisers Leeds	Lord's, London

Men's finals
Season	Date	Winner	Winning margin	Runner-up	Venue
2021	21 August	Southern Brave	32 runs Scorecard	Birmingham Phoenix	Lord's, London
2022	3 September	Trent Rockets	2 wickets Scorecard	Manchester Originals	Lord's, London
2023	27 August	Oval Invincibles	14 runs Scorecard	Manchester Originals	Lord's, London
2024	18 August	Oval Invincibles	17 runs Scorecard	Southern Brave	Lord's, London
2025	31 August	Oval Invincibles	26 runs Scorecard	Trent Rockets	Lord's, London
2026	16 August	Manchester Super Giants	5 wickets Scorecard	Trent Rockets	Lord's, London

== Broadcasting ==
All games are televised by Sky Sports, with the BBC also showing 10 men's and 8 women's games free-to-air. In Germany, Sky Sport streamed the initial tournament on their website. They used the signal from Sky Sports UK.

== Records and statistics ==
=== Team records ===
==== Highest totals ====
As of 4 August 2026

Women's matches
Score	Team	Opponent	Date
214/5 (100 balls)	Northern Superchargers	London Spirit	30 August 2025
181/3 (100 balls)	Welsh Fire	Trent Rockets	14 August 2023
177/4 (100 balls)	Welsh Fire	MI London	25 July 2026
176/5 (100 balls)	London Spirit	Oval Invincibles	5 August 2025
174/5 (100 balls)	Oval Invincibles	Birmingham Phoenix	12 August 2025

- Source: CricInfo

Men's matches
Score	Team	Opponent	Date
241/2 (100 balls)	Sunrisers Leeds	London Spirit	4 August 2026
226/4 (100 balls)	Oval Invincibles	Welsh Fire	16 August 2025
214/4 (100 balls)	Birmingham Phoenix	Trent Rockets	24 July 2026
208/5 (100 balls)	Manchester Originals	Northern Superchargers	21 August 2022
204/6 (100 balls)	London Spirit	Sunrisers Leeds	4 August 2026
204/7 (100 balls)	Trent Rockets	Birmingham Phoenix	24 July 2026

- Source: CricInfo

==== Lowest totals ====
These totals only include completed innings. They also exclude innings where the number of balls to be bowled is reduced, usually because of rain. Successful low scoring run-chases are also excluded.

As of 4 August 2026

Women's matches
Score	Team	Opponent	Date
54 (86 balls)	Birmingham Phoenix	Northern Superchargers	6 August 2024
64 (66 balls)	Oval Invincibles	Northern Superchargers	2 August 2024
64 (95 balls)	Birmingham Phoenix	Trent Rockets	24 July 2026
72 (83 balls)	Oval Invincibles	Southern Brave	18 August 2025
73 (98 balls)	Southern Brave	Oval Invincibles	21 August 2021 (Note: Score made during the 2021 final)

- Source: CricInfo

Men's matches
Score	Team	Opponent	Date
75 (74 balls)	Birmingham Phoenix	Manchester Originals	28 August 2022
80 (94 balls)	London Spirit	Oval Invincibles	5 August 2025
83 (96 balls)	Northern Superchargers	Birmingham Phoenix	6 August 2024
83 (76 balls)	Northern Superchargers	Manchester Originals	20 August 2023
86/8 (100 balls)	Manchester Originals	Welsh Fire	25 July 2024

- Source: CricInfo

=== Batting ===
==== Most runs ====
Women
Runs	Player	Team
1,324	Sophia Dunkley	Trent Rockets (2026); Welsh Fire (2023–2025); Southern Brave (2021–2022)
1,317	Nat Sciver-Brunt	Trent Rockets
1,239	Danni Wyatt-Hodge	MI London (2026); Southern Brave (2021–2025)
1,197	Laura Wolvaardt	Southern Brave (2025–2026); Manchester Originals (2023–2024); Northern Superchargers (2021–2022)
893	Marizanne Kapp	London Spirit (2026); Oval Invincibles (2021–2025)

As of 5 August 2026

- Source: CricInfo

Men
Runs	Player	Team
1,294	Phil Salt	Welsh Fire (2026); Manchester Originals (2021–2025)
1,276	Ben Duckett	Trent Rockets (2026); Birmingham Phoenix (2023–2025); Welsh Fire (2021–2022)
1,260	Will Jacks	Oval Invincibles / MI London
1,221	James Vince	MI London (2026); Southern Brave (2021–2025)
1,192	Jos Buttler	Manchester Originals / Manchester Super Giants

As of 5 August 2026

- Source: CricInfo

==== List of centuries ====
Score	Player	Team	Opposition	Venue	Date	Ref.
101*	Will Smeed	Birmingham Phoenix	Southern Brave	Edgbaston	10 August 2022	
108*	Will Jacks	Oval Invincibles	Southern Brave	The Oval	14 August 2022	
118	Tammy Beaumont	Welsh Fire	Trent Rockets	Sophia Gardens	14 August 2023	
105*	Harry Brook	Northern Superchargers	Welsh Fire	Headingley	22 August 2023	
101	Davina Perrin	Northern Superchargers	London Spirit	The Oval	30 August 2025	

- Source: CricInfo

=== Bowling ===
==== Most wickets ====
Women
Wickets	Player	Team
65	Lauren Bell	Southern Brave
55	Marizanne Kapp	London Spirit (2026); Oval Invincibles (2021–2025)
52	Amanda-Jade Wellington	Oval Invincibles (2024-2025); Manchester Originals (2023); Southern Brave (2021–2022)
50	Kate Cross	Northern Superchargers / Sunrisers Leeds (2023–2026); Manchester Originals (2021–2022)
47	Emily Arlott	Welsh Fire (2026); Birmingham Phoenix (2021–2025)
47	Hayley Matthews	MI London (2026); Welsh Fire (2021–2025)

As of 4 August 2026

- Source: CricInfo

Men
Wickets	Player	Team
53	Adil Rashid	Southern Brave (2026); Northern Superchargers (2021–2025)
51	Tymal Mills	London Spirit (2026); Southern Brave (2021–2025)
49	Sam Curran	Oval Invincibles / MI London
46	Tom Curran	Oval Invincibles / MI London
43	Rashid Khan	Oval Invincibles / MI London (2025–2026); Trent Rockets (2021–2022, 2024)

As of 4 August 2026

- Source: CricInfo

==== List of hat-tricks ====
Bowler	Team	Opponent	Figures	Venue	Date	Ref.
Imran Tahir	Birmingham Phoenix	Welsh Fire	5/25	Edgbaston	9 August 2021	
Alana King	Trent Rockets	Manchester Originals	4/15	Old Trafford	13 August 2022	
Shabnim Ismail	Welsh Fire	Birmingham Phoenix	3/31	Edgbaston	10 August 2023	
Tymal Mills	Southern Brave	Welsh Fire	4/13	Sophia Gardens	12 August 2023	
Sam Curran	Oval Invincibles	London Spirit	5/16	Lord’s	4 August 2024	
Kathryn Bryce	Manchester Originals	Northern Superchargers	5/12	Old Trafford	11 August 2024	
Sonny Baker	Manchester Originals	Northern Superchargers	3/21	Old Trafford	17 August 2025	

== Salary cap ==
Salary caps per side (2021–2026)
Year	Men's salary cap	Women's salary cap	Notes & references
2021	£800,000	£120,000	(Note: Inaugural season; salaries were reduced due to the COVID-19 pandemic.)
2022	£1,000,000	£250,000	(Note: Women's salary cap increased significantly, more than doubling from the previous season.)
2023	£1,000,000	£250,000	(Note: Salary caps for both competitions remained unchanged from 2022.)
2024	£1,000,000	£350,000	(Note: Men's salary cap remained frozen; the women's competition received a league-wide pay rise.)
2025	£1,403,000	£430,000	(Note: Transitional season ahead of the introduction of a full auction-based salary system.)
2026	£2,050,000	£880,000	(Note: First full player auction; introduction of salary bands ("salary collars") regulating minimum and maximum contract values.)

== Reaction ==
The decision to create an entirely new format of cricket, with teams based in just seven major cities, has split opinion amongst cricket fans. England's test captain at the time, Joe Root, welcomed the ECB's plans, believing it would attract a completely new audience to the game. ODI and T20 captain Eoin Morgan expressed a similar opinion. Former T20 captain Stuart Broad was hugely optimistic about the new format. Michael Vaughan echoed Broad's comments, believing that it would be an appealing concept to broadcasters, and Michael Atherton stated that while a T20 match is rarely completed in a three-hour window, this can be achieved with The Hundred.

However, former MCC chief Keith Bradshaw said he hoped the 100-ball tournament would not be "innovation for innovation's sake", and voiced his concern that the new format would mean that the ECB could not exploit the T20 boom. The England and Wales Professional Cricketers' Association announced that overall players were "open-minded" about the tournament. Former Indian captain Virat Kohli cited concerns about the commercialisation and was not entirely in favour of the new version.

After the teams and branding were announced, anti-obesity groups criticised the sponsorship from snack food company KP Snacks. Social media reaction has also been split. During the player draft on 20 October 2019, the Twitter hashtag "#OpposeThe100" began trending, with a vocal section of cricket fans dismayed at the format of the competition, particularly whose home grounds are not among the eight used by city franchises. Women's cricketers have been particularly enthusiastic about the new format and the decision to run both competitions in parallel, with the same prize money, allowing many to turn professional for the first time. At the conclusion of the inaugural season, it was revealed that 55% of tickets were bought by people who had never bought one before, and that several records were set with regards to television viewing and match attendance figures. Former England women's captain Charlotte Edwards said that the tournament had "single-handedly changed women's cricket in this country". At the conclusion of the second season, it was announced that ticket sales had remained relatively stable at 500,000 but that viewing figures from broadcast had dropped from just over 16 million to 14 million.

== See also ==
- T20 Blast
