= Mukhtar Ahmed =

Mukhtar Ahmed may refer to:

== People ==
- Mukhtar Ahmed (cricketer) (born 1992), Pakistani cricketer for Sialkot
- Mukhtar Ahmed (politician) (born 1967), Nigerian politician
- Mukhtar Ahmed Ansari (1880–1936), Indian politician
- Mukhtiar Ahmad Junejo (1930–2017), Pakistani judge
- Mukhtar Ahmed Malik, Pakistani politician
- Mukhtar Ahmed Waza (born 1966), Kashmiri separatist leader
