= Washington Freedom (cricket) =

Washington-based cricket franchise

- League: Major League Cricket

Personnel
- Captain: Steve Smith
- Coach: Ricky Ponting
- Owner: Sanjay Govil
- Chief executive: Dhiraj Malhotra
- Manager: Craig Afonso

Team information
- Colours: Red, White, and Blue
- Founded: 2023; 3 years ago

History
- Major League Cricket wins: 1 (2024)
- Official website: washingtonfreedom.com
T20 kit

Season
- 2023 • 2024 • 2025 • 2026 • 2027

The Washington Freedom is an American professional Twenty20 franchise cricket team based in Washington, D.C., United States. that competes in Major League Cricket (MLC).

The team was announced in 2023 as one of six inaugural franchises to play in the league. The Freedom are owned by Indian American entrepreneur Sanjay Govil. The team is coached by Ricky Ponting and is captained by Steve Smith.

== History ==
=== Team creation ===
In May 2022, Major League Cricket announced that it had secured $120 million from various investors across the United States. One of these investors was Sanjay Govil, who was later announced to be the lead investor and owner of the Washington DC–based franchise team. Alongside MLC, Govil partnered up with George Mason University to launch a feasibility study into a 12,000-seat hybrid cricket/baseball stadium later that year in December. The proposed stadium would host both cricket and baseball games and support up to 12,000 spectators upon its completion in summer 2025. George Mason University announced in March 2024 that it would not proceed with the stadium.

In February 2023, Major League Cricket announced that Govil had entered a partnership with Cricket New South Wales to help accelerate the growth of the DC-based franchise. The agreement included initiatives to further player development opportunities, as well as cricket content, within the U.S., an exchange program of coaches and support staff, and opportunities for NSW-based players to play in MLC. Cricket NSW chief executive Lee Germon stated that "... he [Govil] was very keen to not have an IPL partner... [and wanted to] partner with someone outside who could really bring what we wanted to the table."

In March 2023, the team's name, Washington Freedom, and logo were officially unveiled to the public. Upon the unveiling of the team name and logo, Govil said that, "the team's mark and colors are a perfect for a team from the nation's capital to compete on the global stage."

==== 2023: Inaugural season ====
The Freedom, in the second overall 2023 draft, picked Seattle-based Andries Gous. Dane Piedt, Mukhtar Ahmed, and Saad Ali were also all picked up by the team, with South African quick Anrich Nortje announced as a direct signing during the draft. Further signings were made throughout May and June, consisting of the likes of Marco Jansen, Akeal Hosein, and New Zealander Glenn Phillips.

Ahead of the inaugural season opener, the team announced it would be led by Australian Moises Henriques and coached by Greg Shipperd. Tanveer Sangha was brought on in early July as a replacement for Wanindu Hasaranga, who dropped out, while Matthew Short was added to the squad as an injury replacement for Josh Philippe.

On July 12, 2023, Steve Smith joined Washington Freedom as the team's brand ambassador.

During the group stage, the Freedom were narrowly defeated by Seattle before a six-run defense against Texas marked the team's first victory in the tournament. They would then proceed to prevail in a run chase of 176 against Los Angeles and demolish San Francisco by 30 runs, ensuring a playoff berth. A defeat at the hands of New York, however, would see them confined to a third-place group stage finish heading into the finals. New York would again defeat the Freedom in the Eliminator, taking them out of finals contention and ending their tournament.

=== Dominance under Smith, Maxwell ===
From 2024 through to 2026, the Freedom were considered to be one of the strongest and most dominant teams in the league. During this period, the team reached three consecutive MLC finals and clinched their first title win in 2024.

==== 2024: Maiden MLC title ====
The captain of the Washington Freedom, Steven Smith, posing for a picture with the 2024 Major League Cricket trophy after winning the championship against San Francisco.

Following a good inaugural season, the team retained much of its overseas and domestic core, including Akeal Hosein and U.S. bulwarks Andries Gous and Saurabh Netravalkar. Ahead of the 2024 season opener, the team signed, amongst others, domestics Ian Holland, Yasir Mohammad and future captains Steve Smith and Glenn Maxwell.

With Smith appointed the team's captain and Ricky Ponting replacing Shipperd as head coach, he led the Freedom through a dominant tournament – with Maxwell and fellow Australian teammate Travis Head firing with the bat and Netravalkar and New Zealander Rachin Ravindra topping the league's bowling charts. In the group stage, they went top of the table by first recording a 3-0-1 record in Morrisville. Barring one washout game against Texas, the Freedom defeated New York by 4 runs in a rain-affected endeavor, cruised past Seattle by 5 wickets, and crushed Los Angeles by 8 wickets. In Grand Prairie, the team continued their undefeated streak by again defeating Los Angeles, steamrolling New York by 94 runs, and clinching a heavy 42-run victory over Texas. Their only defeat of the season came at the hands of San Francisco, as they were downed by 6 wickets. In the finals, the Freedom defeated the Unicorns by 96 runs to win their first title.

==== 2025–2026: Continued form, strong title runs ====
The following year in February, ahead of the Freedom's third season, the team once again retained much of its overseas and domestic cadre, but had to let go of Head due to an overlapping Australian tour of the West Indies. In the four-month leadup to the season opener, the Freedom made a slew of signings to fill up its remaining team spots, including Mitchell Owen and Glenn Phillips. Amidst concern that Smith would not be able to play for the Freedom due to international commitments, the Freedom confirmed that they were eyeing a 2-match stint for him. Ultimately, due to an injury, he dropped out of the tournament as Maxwell took over captaincy duties.

As defending champions, the Freedom began their season with a crushing 123-run loss to San Francisco – courtesy of Finn Allen's mammoth 151. They quickly recovered, going 4–0 with a 5-wicket win over Seattle, a heavy 113-run Maxwell-powered victory over Los Angeles, a thrilling last-over 2-wicket game against New York, and a high-scoring 7-wicket chase against Texas. The Freedom closed off their Dallas leg of the tournament strong by again defeating Los Angeles via a last-ball single and delivering San Francisco a 12-run defeat, their first of the season. Ensured of a playoff berth, Washington headed into Lauderhill with a 6–1 record, tied with San Francisco on points but lower on net run rate.

At Lauderhill, in a rain-affected game, the Freedom began poorly with a hefty 43-run defeat to Texas. However, in a play for a top-two finish, the Freedom steamrolled Seattle by 8 wickets and eased past New York by 6 wickets. After shooting up to a first-place group stage finish heading into the playoffs, the Freedom advanced on higher seeding to play New York in the final following a Qualifier 1 washout. The Freedom ultimately were downed by 5 runs in a last-over thriller, providing New York with their second MLC championship.

Smith returned to captain the team ahead of the 2026 season; a series of players, including Glenn Phillips and domestic Justin Dill, were let go in favor of Australian cricketers Ben Dwarshuis and Nikhil Chaudhary while South Africa's Marco Jansen was brought back in an attempt to bolster the team's bowling attack.

The first half of the tournament was a mixed bag overall for the Freedom, marked by a loss-win trend; in their season opener against Seattle in Dallas, an Ottneil Baartman 4-fer set up a 5-wicket loss, while a day later Mitchell Owen's record-breaking 155 delivered their first win of the season against New York. The pattern held as Jessy Singh's 5-fer handed the Freedom a crushing 88-run defeat to Seattle before a last-ball six by Nikhil Chaudhary capped off a thrilling win over Texas. The Freedom ended its Oakland leg and reached the tournament's halfway stage with a battering 8-wicket defeat to San Francisco, set up by Lhuan-dre Pretorius' 26-ball 66. Heading into the Pomona leg of the tournament, the Freedom maintained a 2–3 record, placing outside of the top four.

The second half of the tournament was dominant; the Freedom went 4–1 in their five remaining games. By routing Los Angeles by six wickets and overcoming San Francisco by five, the team snapped their loss-win trend and soared to the top of the table. Barring an 18-run loss in a rematch to Los Angeles, the Freedom won their next two games against Texas and New York by three and five wickets, clinching a third-place group stage finish and a playoff spot for the fourth year running. In their first eliminator game, Andries Gous' 132 and Smith's 110* led the Freedom to triumph in a record-breaking chase of 267, driving the team's rally into the challenger match, where Gous' 73 propelled the Freedom past San Francisco into the final for the third straight time. At the final, the Freedom were beat out narrowly by one run as Shadley van Schalkwyk held on, three wickets falling in the final over.

== Home stadium ==
After previously eyeing George Mason University for a potential home stadium, the Freedom's plans were scrapped in early March 2024. Its construction had faced opposition from both students and university neighbors, hence the proposal's rejection. Thus, looking elsewhere, Freedom co-owner Sanjay Govil "lobbied top [D.C.] officials" for a cricket stadium on the defunct RFK Stadium's campus. The stadium, which was initially envisioned to be a temporary 4,000-seater stadium, evolved into a 10,000-seater proposal in the wake of the New Stadium at RFK Campus deal.

The team is also pushing for a potential stadium, which is described as a cricket park in a well-preserved green environment along the Monocacy River in Frederick, Maryland, situated in the D.C. metro area. Called "Frederick Gateway", the facility would host a maximum of 10,000 spectators and currently requires rezoning of some land. The rezoning proposal unanimously cleared the Frederick Planning Commission on July 14, 2025. Over the next several months, the proposal underwent several revisions under the guidance of the City Council, and was cleared for approval on August 6, 2026. Construction on the site broke ground on October 16, 2026. The Freedom hope to complete construction and host matches at the site by the start of the 2027 season.

== Current squad ==
- Players with international caps are listed in **bold**.

Washington Freedom roster
Name	Nat.	Date of Birth	Batting Style	Bowling Style	Year signed	Notes
Batters
**Steve Smith**	Australia	June 2, 1989 (age 37)	Right-handed	Right-arm leg spin	2024	Direct signing
**Mark Chapman**	New Zealand	June 27, 1994 (age 32)	Left-handed	Slow left-arm orthodox	2025	Direct signing
Jack Edwards	Australia	April 19, 2000 (age 26)	Right-handed	—N/a	2024	Direct signing
**Mukhtar Ahmed**	Pakistan	December 20, 1992 (age 33)	Right-handed	Right-arm leg break googly	2023	
All-rounders
**Mitchell Owen**	Australia	16 September 2001 (age 25)	Right-handed	Right-arm medium	2025	
**Glenn Maxwell**	Australia	October 14, 1988 (age 38)	Right-handed	Right-arm off break	2024	Direct signing
**Rachin Ravindra**	New Zealand	November 18, 1999 (age 26)	Left-handed	Slow left-arm orthodox	2024	Direct signing
Obus Pienaar	United States	December 12, 1989 (age 36)	Right-handed	Left-arm off spin	2023	
**Ian Holland**	United States	October 3, 1990 (age 36)	Right-handed	Right-arm medium	2024	
Wicket-keeper
**Andries Gous**	United States	November 24, 1993 (age 32)	Right-handed		2023	
Lahiru Milantha	Sri Lanka	May 28, 1994 (age 32)	Left-handed		2024	
Bowlers
**Saurabh Netravalkar**	United States	October 16, 1991 (age 35)	Right-handed	Left-arm medium fast	2023	
**Marco Jansen**	South Africa	1 May 2000	Right-handed	Left-arm fast	2023	Direct signing
**Lockie Ferguson**	New Zealand	June 13, 1991 (age 35)	Right-handed	Right-arm fast	2024	Direct signing
**Ben Dwarshuis**	Australia	23 June 1994	Left-handed	Left-arm fast-medium	2023	Direct signing
**Amila Aponso**	United States	June 23, 1993 (age 33)	Right-handed	Slow left-arm orthodox	2024	
**Yasir Mohammad**	United States	October 10, 2002 (age 24)	Left-handed	Legbreak Googly	2024	

== Administration and support staff ==
Washington Freedom staff
Position	Name
General Manager	(Australia) Michael Klinger
Head Coach	(Australia) Ricky Ponting
Assistant Coach	(Australia) James Hopes
Assistant Coach	(Australia) Shawn Bradstreet
Bowling coach	(South Africa) Dale Steyn

=== Coaching history ===
Name	Years	Position	ref
(Australia) Greg Shipperd	2023	Head coach	
(Australia) Ricky Ponting	2024–	Head Coach	

== Seasons ==
=== Summaries ===
Season	W–L	Pos.	Finals	Coach	Captain	Most Runs	Most Wickets	Refs
2023	3-3	3rd	SF	Greg Shipperd	Moises Henriques	Matthew Short (152)	Saurabh Netravalkar (10)	
2024	7-1	1st	C	Ricky Ponting	Steve Smith	Steve Smith (336)	Saurabh Netravalkar (15)	
2025	8–2	1st	R	Ricky Ponting	Glenn Maxwell	Mitchell Owen (313)	Jack Edwards (14); Mitchell Owen (14)	
2026	6-4	3rd	R	Ricky Ponting	Steve Smith	Andries Gous (543)	Ben Dwarshuis (16)	
2027

=== Tournament finishes ===
Year	League standing	Final standing
2023	3rd out of 6	Semifinals
2024	1st out of 6	Champions
2025	2nd out of 6	Runners-up
2026	3rd out of 6	Runners-up
2027

- C: champions
- RU: runner-up
- SF team qualified for the semi-final stage of the competition

=== Statistics ===
Year	Played	Wins	Losses	Tied/NR (Note: NR indicates "no result"; abandoned matches are indicated as no result.)
2023	6	3	3	0
2024	9	7	1	1
2025	12	8	3	1
2026	13	8	5	0
2027
Source: ESPNCricinfo

== Records and statistics ==
As of July 20, 2026

=== Results summary ===
Opposition	M	Won	Lost	Tied (W)	NR	W–L%
Los Angeles Knight Riders	6	4	2	0	0	80.00
MI New York	8	7	1	0	0	87.50
San Francisco Unicorns	8	5	3	0	0	62.50
Seattle Orcas	5	3	2	0	0	60.00
Texas Super Kings	7	4	1	0	0	80.00
Overall	40	27	11	0	2	72.97

=== Team Records ===
==== Highest totals ====
Score (Overs)	RR	Inns	Opposition	Venue	Tournament	Date	Ref
270/4 (18.4)	14.46	2	MI New York	Oakland	2026 Major League Cricket	July 15, 2026	
245/5 (20)	12.25	1	MI New York	Dallas	2026 Major League Cricket	June 20, 2026	
238/6 (20)	11.90	1	San Francisco Unicorns	Oakland	2026 Major League Cricket	July 16, 2026	
223/3 (19.4)	11.33	2	Texas Super Kings	Dallas	2025 Major League Cricket	June 22, 2025	
216 (20)	10.80	1	Seattle Orcas	Dallas	2026 Major League Cricket	June 19, 2026	

==== Lowest totals ====
Score (Overs)	RR	Inns	Opposition	Venue	Tournament	Date	Ref
139 (16.2)	8.51	2	Seattle Orcas	Oakland	2026 Major League Cricket	June 25, 2026	
146 (13.1)	11.08	2	San Francisco Unicorns	Oakland	2025 Major League Cricket	June 12, 2025	

=== Batting records ===
==== Most career runs ====
Batter	Span	Mat	Inns	Runs
Andries Gous	2024–2026	32	30	876
Mitchell Owen	2025–2026	24	23	731
Steve Smith	2024–2026	21	21	727
Rachin Ravindra	2024–2026	24	23	484
Glenn Maxwell	2024–2026	26	21	444
Travis Head	2024	9	9	336
Mark Chapman	2025–2026	10	10	273

==== Highest individual score ====
Batter	Runs	Balls	Opposition	Venue	Tournament	Date
Mitchell Owen	155	68	MI New York	Dallas	2026 Major League Cricket	June 20, 2026
Andries Gous	132	51	MI New York	Oakland	2026 Major League Cricket	July 15, 2026
Steve Smith	110*	48	MI New York	Oakland	2026 Major League Cricket	July 15, 2026
Glenn Maxwell	106*	49	Los Angeles Knight Riders	Oakland	2025 Major League Cricket	June 17, 2025

==== Highest averages ====
Batter	Span	Mat	Inns	Ave
Glenn Phillips	2025	10	8	62.00
Travis Head	2024	9	9	48.00
Steve Smith	2024–2026	21	21	45.43
Andries Gous	2024–2026	32	30	38.08
Mitchell Owen	2025–2026	24	23	31.78

==== Strike rates ====
Batter	Span	SR
Mitchell Owen	2025–2026	198.10
Glenn Maxwell	2024–2026	167.54
Rachin Ravindra	2024–2026	166.32
Andries Gous	2024–2026	151.29
Steve Smith	2024–2026	141.43

=== Bowling records ===
==== Most wickets ====
Bowler	Span	Inn	Wickets
Saurabh Netravalkar	2024–2026	29	38
Rachin Ravindra	2024–2026	16	25
Mitchell Owen	2025–2026	21	24
Glenn Maxwell	2024–2026	18	23
Ian Holland	2024–2026	23	23

==== Best bowling figures ====
Bowler	Figure	Overs	Econ	Opposition	Venue	Tournament	Date	Ref
Mitchell Owen	5/17	3.0	5.66	San Francisco Unicorns	Dallas	2025 Major League Cricket	June 28, 2025	
Rachin Ravindra	4/11	2.4	4.12	San Francisco Unicorns	Dallas	2024 Major League Cricket	July 25, 2024	
Jack Edwards	4/13	3.3	3.71	San Francisco Unicorns	Pomona	2026 Major League Cricket	July 4, 2026	
Rachin Ravindra	4/16	3.5	4.17	Texas Super Kings	Dallas	2024 Major League Cricket	July 19, 2024	

=== Partnership records ===
==== Highest partnership by runs ====
Runs	First batter	Second batter	Opposition	Wicket	Venue	Date
241	Steve Smith	Andries Gous	MI New York	3rd	Oakland	July 15, 2026
134	Steve Smith	Mitchell Owen	MI New York	1st	Dallas	June 20, 2026
119	Mitchell Owen	Andries Gous	Texas Super Kings	2nd	Dallas	June 22, 2025
116*	Obus Pienaar	Glenn Maxwell	Los Angeles Knight Riders	6th	Oakland	June 17, 2025

==== Highest partnership by wicket ====
Wicket	Runs	First batter	Second batter	Opposition	Venue	Date
1st	134	Steve Smith	Mitchell Owen	MI New York	Dallas	June 20, 2026
2nd	119	Mitchell Owen	Andries Gous	Texas Super Kings	Dallas	June 22, 2025
3rd	241	Steve Smith	Andries Gous	MI New York	Oakland	July 15, 2026
4th	85*	Glenn Maxwell	Travis Head	San Francisco Unicorns	Dallas	July 25, 2024
5th	71	Glenn Phillips	Jack Edwards	San Francisco Unicorns	Dallas	June 28, 2025
6th	116*	Obus Pienaar	Glenn Maxwell	Los Angeles Knight Riders	Oakland	June 17, 2025

=== Fielding records ===
==== Most catches ====
Player	Span	Mat	Ct
Glenn Maxwell	2024–2026	26	19
Obus Pienaar	2024–2026	33	16
Steve Smith	2024–2026	21	14
Mitchell Owen	2025–2026	24	12

=== Wicketkeeping records ===
==== Most dismissals ====
Player	Span	Mat	Dismissals
Andries Gous	2024–2026	32	19
BKEL Milantha	2024–2026	7	1

== Captains ==
List of Washington Freedom captains
Captain	Span	Mat	Won	Lost	Tied	NR	W–L%
Steve Smith	2024–2026	21	15	5	0	1	75.00
Glenn Maxwell	2025	12	8	3	0	1	72.72
