= Mukhtar Ahmed (politician) =

Nigerian politician

Mukhtar Ahmed Monrovia

Member of the House of Representatives
- Incumbent
- Assumed office 2019
- Constituency: Kaduna South Federal Constituency

Personal details
- Born: 1967 (age 58–59) Kaduna State, Nigeria
- Party: All Progressives Congress (APC)
- Occupation: Politician

Mukhtar Ahmed Monrovia is a Nigerian politician who served as a member representing Kaduna South Federal Constituency in the House of Representatives. Born in 1967, he hails from Kaduna State. He was elected into the House of Assembly in 2019 under the All Progressives Congress (APC). He organized a digital training program for girls, distributing 55 laptops as well as cash gifts to his constituents.
