= Sanjay Govil =

Indian-American businessman

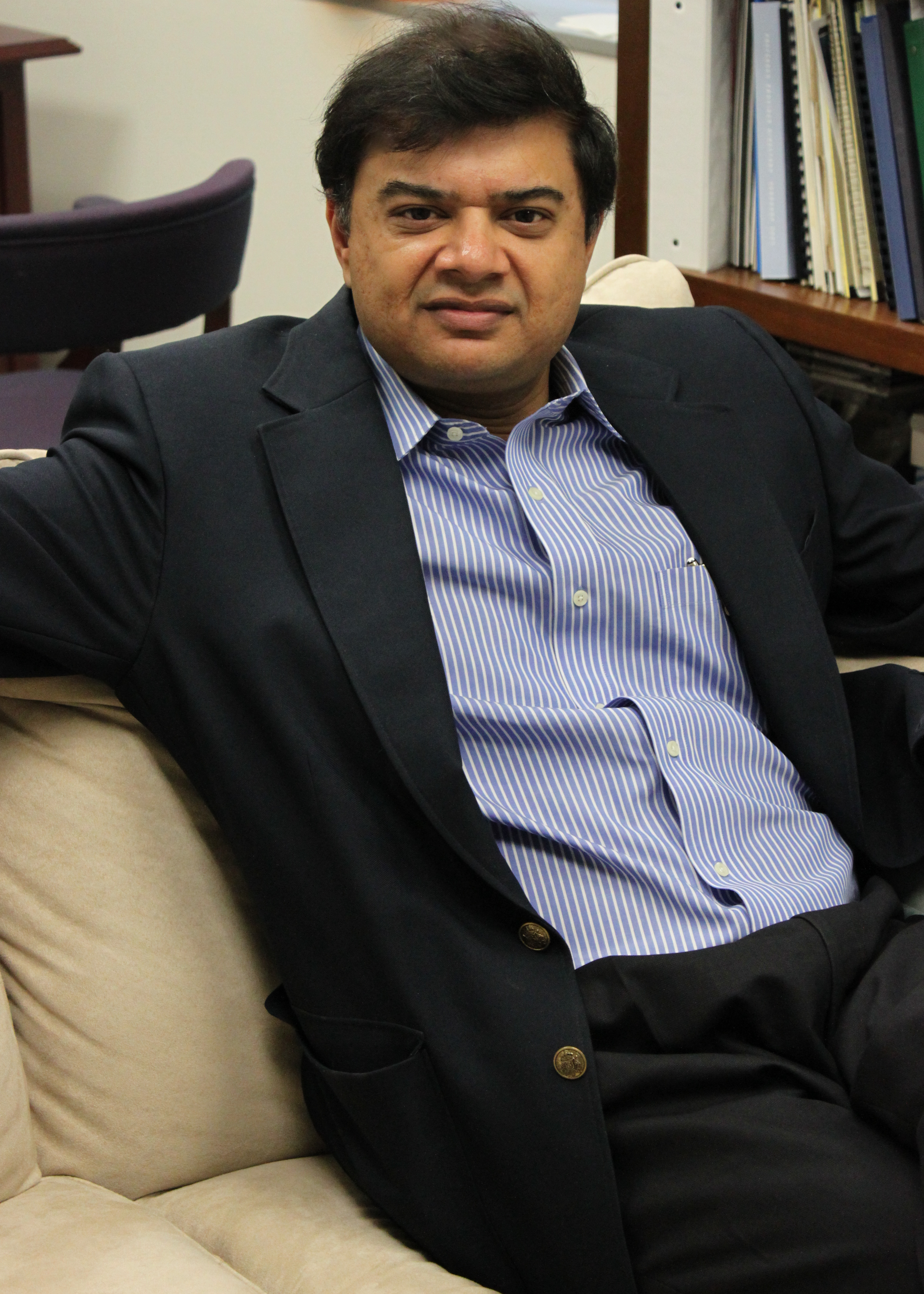
- Education: B.A., Auburn University; M.A., Syracuse University, Wharton School of Business
- Occupation: Businessman

Sanjay Govil is an Indian-American businessman. He is the owner of the Washington Freedom cricket team, a co-owner of the Welsh Fire cricket team, and the founder and chairman of Infinite Computer Solutions.

== Early life and education ==
Govil graduated from Auburn University with a degree in electrical engineering. He also has advanced degrees from Syracuse University and Wharton School of Business. His father was a professor of mathematics at Auburn University.

== Career ==
Govil began his career at IBM. In 1999, Govil founded Infinite Computers, a global technology platform provider. The company went private in 2018; as of 2023, Govil sits on the Board of Directors of the company. Govil is the founder and CEO of Zyter.

Govil also owned the Delhi Acers badminton team before a sellout to the Dalmia Group ahead of the 2017-18 Premier Badminton League season.

Govil is a founding investor in Major League Cricket and the lead team investor and owner of the Washington Freedom cricket team. Govil and the team partnered with George Mason University to attempt to build a combined cricket and baseball stadium in Fairfax, Virginia. In March 2024, the project was scrapped, but efforts to build a stadium at a different site in the D.C., Virginia, and Maryland area have continued.

In 2025, Govil secured a 50% stake in the Cardiff-based cricket team Welsh Fire for approximately $50 million.
