= Sharad Lumba =

Indian cricketer (born 1989)

Personal information
- Born: 10 September 1989 (age 37); Amritsar, Punjab, India
- Batting: Right-handed
- Role: Batsman

Domestic team information
- Years: Team
- 2013/14–2019/20: Punjab
- 2018: Mumbai Indians
- 2025: MI New York
- Source: Cricinfo, 29 January 2017

Sharad Lumba (born 10 September 1989) is an Indian cricketer. He made his Twenty20 debut for Punjab in the 2013–14 Syed Mushtaq Ali Trophy on 1 April 2014. In January 2018, he was bought by the Mumbai Indians in the 2018 IPL auction. He made his List A debut for Punjab in the 2018–19 Vijay Hazare Trophy on 23 September 2018. He made his first-class debut on 9 December 2019, for Punjab in the 2019–20 Ranji Trophy.
