= Mitchell Owen =

Australian cricketer (born 2001)

Personal information
- Full name: Mitchell James Owen
- Born: 16 September 2001 (age 25); Hobart, Tasmania, Australia
- Height: 194 cm (6 ft 4 in)
- Batting: Right-handed
- Bowling: Right-arm medium
- Role: All-rounder

International information
- National side: Australia (2025–present)
- ODI debut (cap 250): 19 October 2025 v India
- Last ODI: 25 October 2025 v India
- T20I debut (cap 112): 20 July 2025 v West Indies
- Last T20I: 1 February 2026 v Pakistan
- T20I shirt no.: 61

Domestic team information
- Years: Team
- 2020/21–: Hobart Hurricanes (squad no. 16)
- 2020/21–: Tasmania
- 2025: Paarl Royals
- 2025: Peshawar Zalmi
- 2025–: Punjab Kings
- 2025–: Washington Freedom
- 2026: Birmingham Phoenix

Career statistics
Competition	ODI	T20I	FC	LA
Matches	3	15	17	33
Runs scored	37	179	587	617
Batting average	18.50	17.90	23.48	22.03
100s/50s	0/0	0/1	0/5	1/1
Top score	36	50	83	149
Balls bowled	36	30	1,408	649
Wickets	2	2	22	22
Bowling average	21.00	29.50	43.36	33.90
5 wickets in innings	0	0	0	0
10 wickets in match	0	0	0	0
Best bowling	2/20	1/14	4/58	4/57
Catches/stumpings	0/–	4/–	9/–	14/–
- Source: ESPNcricinfo, 25 October 2026

Mitchell James Owen (born 16 September 2001) is an Australian cricketer. He made his Twenty20 debut on 12 January 2021, for the Hobart Hurricanes, in the 2020–21 Big Bash League season. He made his international debut in 2025 against the West Indies. In 2026, he recorded the highest individual Major League Cricket score, scoring 155 of 68 balls for Washington Freedom, breaking the record of 151 by Finn Allen.

== Domestic career ==
He made his List A debut on 22 February 2021, for Tasmania in the 2020–21 Marsh One-Day Cup. He made his First-class cricket debut for Tasmania on 3 October 2023 against South Australia, in the 2023–24 Sheffield Shield season.

On 21 December 2024, Owen made 101 not out to lead the Hobart Hurricanes to an eight-wicket win over the Perth Scorchers. His 101 came off 64 balls, including five sixes and nine fours.

On 27 January 2025, Owen equalled the record for the fastest BBL century in the final of the 2024–25 season against the Sydney Thunder, eventually recording 108 runs off 42 balls and leading the Hobart Hurricanes to their maiden title.

In June 2026, Owen hit 155 off 68 balls while playing for Washington Freedom against MI New York in the 5th match, breaking the record for the highest score in Major League Cricket history.

== International career ==
In June 2025, Owen earned his maiden international call up; being named Australian T20I squad for the tour of the West Indies in July.
