= Jack Edwards (cricketer, born 2000) =

Australian cricketer (born 2000)

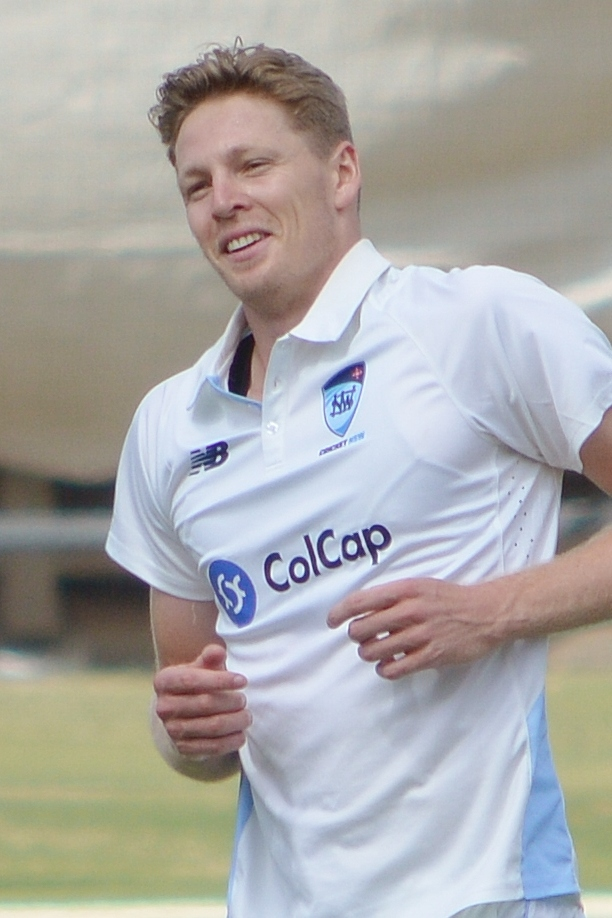
- Edwards in 2025

Personal information
- Full name: Jack Richard Edwards
- Born: 19 April 2000 (age 26); Allambie Heights, New South Wales, Australia
- Height: 1.94 m (6 ft 4 in)
- Batting: Right-handed
- Bowling: Right-arm medium
- Role: All-rounder
- Relatives: Mickey Edwards (brother)

International information
- National side: Australia (2026)
- ODI debut: 24 September 2026 v South Africa
- Last ODI: 27 September 2026 v South Africa
- ODI shirt no.: 254
- Only T20I (cap 115): 29 January 2026 v Pakistan

Domestic team information
- Years: Team
- 2018/19–present: New South Wales
- 2018/19–present: Sydney Sixers
- 2024: Washington Freedom

Career statistics
| Competition | ODI | T20I | FC | LA |
|---|---|---|---|---|
| Matches | 5 | 2 | 51 | 42 |
| Runs scored | 78 | 30 | 2,480 | 1,005 |
| Batting average | 19.50 | 30.00 | 32.63 | 27.16 |
| 100s/50s | 0/0 | 0/0 | 4/7 | 2/5 |
| Top score | 31 | 25* | 138 | 116 |
| Balls bowled | 231 | 30 | 5,477 | 1,178 |
| Wickets | 9 | 2 | 93 | 34 |
| Bowling average | 26.33 | 26.00 | 27.37 | 29.67 |
| 5 wickets in innings | 1 | 0 | 3 | 1 |
| 10 wickets in match | 0 | 0 | 1 | 0 |
| Best bowling | 5/67 | 2/27 | 6/36 | 5/67 |
| Catches/stumpings | 4/– | 1/– | 60/– | 27/– |
- Source: ESPNcricinfo, 22 November 2026

Jack Richard Edwards (born 19 April 2000) is an Australian cricketer who plays as a batting all-rounder. He represents New South Wales in domestic cricket, Sydney Sixers in the Big Bash League, Washington Freedom in the MLC and Sunrisers Hyderabad in the Indian Premier League.

== Career ==
In 2018, he held a rookie contract for New South Wales. In December 2017, he was named in Australia's squad for the 2018 Under-19 Cricket World Cup.

He made his first-class debut for New South Wales in the 2018–19 Sheffield Shield season on 16 October 2018. He made his Twenty20 debut for Sydney Sixers in the 2018–19 Big Bash League season on 22 December 2018.

In February 2025, Edwards signed for Hampshire County Cricket Club for the first two months of the season.

== International cricket ==
In January 2026, Edwards made his T20 International debut against Pakistan.

Edwards made his ODI debut in September 2026, during a tour of South Africa. In his second match, Edwards took a 5 wicket haul, his first in List A cricket.
