= Ian Holland =

American cricketer

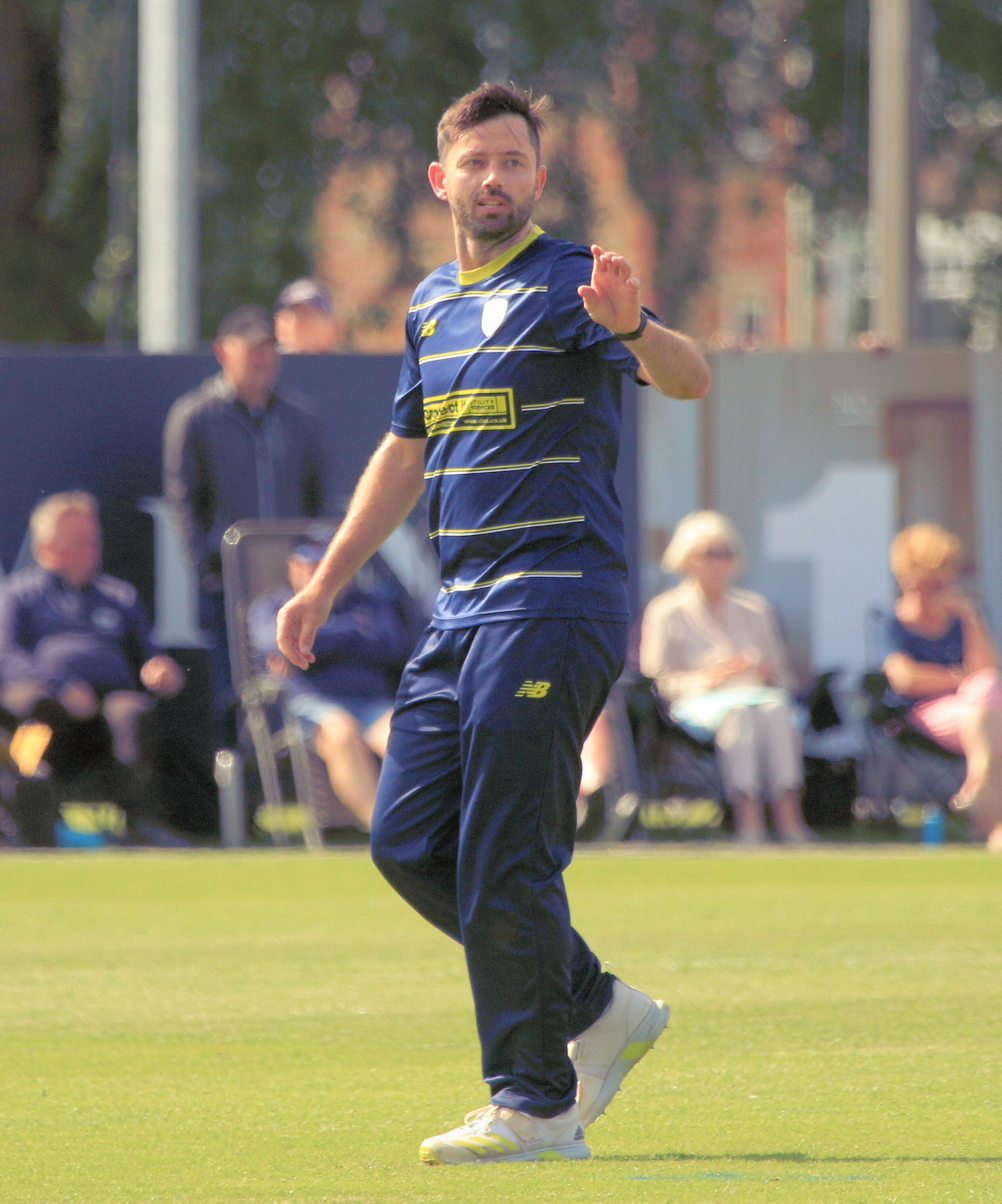
- Holland in 2023

Personal information
- Full name: Ian Gabriel Holland
- Born: 3 October 1990 (age 36); Stevens Point, Wisconsin, US
- Nickname: Dutchy
- Height: 1.83 m (6 ft 0 in)
- Batting: Right-handed
- Bowling: Right-arm medium
- Role: All-rounder

International information
- National side: United States
- ODI debut (cap 30): 8 December 2019 v UAE
- Last ODI: 26 November 2022 v Namibia
- T20I debut (cap 17): 7 November 2021 v Belize
- Last T20I: 13 November 2021 v Bahamas

Domestic team information
- Years: Team
- 2015/16: Victoria (squad no. 30)
- 2017–2024: Hampshire (squad no. 22)
- 2019: → Northamptonshire (on loan)
- 2024: → Leicestershire (on loan)
- 2024–Present: Washington Freedom
- 2025–2026: Leicestershire (squad no. 22)

Career statistics
Competition	ODI	T20I	FC	LA
Matches	15	6	100	73
Runs scored	368	47	3,724	1,189
Batting average	26.28	23.50	25.50	23.31
100s/50s	0/2	0/0	5/19	0/6
Top score	75	39*	146*	77
Balls bowled	628	138	11,143	3,314
Wickets	19	10	185	98
Bowling average	24.52	8.90	27.24	26.71
5 wickets in innings	0	0	4	2
10 wickets in match	0	0	0	0
Best bowling	3/11	2/3	6/38	5/35
Catches/stumpings	6/–	1/–	52/–	29/–
- Source: Cricinfo, 26 September 2026

Ian Gabriel Holland (born 3 October 1990) is an American cricketer who plays for the United States cricket team and for Leicestershire County Cricket Club in England. He has also played domestic cricket in Australia. He plays for Washington Freedom in the MLC

== Early life ==
Holland was born in Wisconsin to an American mother and British-born Australian father. They moved to Australia when he was two years old, and he grew up in Melbourne. In 2012, when he was 21, he won the Australian cricket-based reality television series Cricket Superstar.

== Domestic career ==
Holland earned his first contract with Victoria after winning Cricket Superstar. He made his first-class debut for Victoria on 3 February 2016 in the 2015–16 Sheffield Shield.

He made his List A debut for the English side Hampshire in the 2017 Royal London One-Day Cup on 27 April 2017. He made his Twenty20 cricket debut, also for Hampshire, in the 2017 NatWest t20 Blast on 3 August 2017.

In August 2020, in the third round of matches in the 2020 Bob Willis Trophy, Holland took his maiden five-wicket haul in first-class cricket.

== International career ==
In December 2019, he was named in the United States' One Day International (ODI) squad for the 2019 United Arab Emirates Tri-Nation Series. He made his ODI debut for the United States, against the United Arab Emirates on 8 December 2019.

In October 2021, he was named in the American Twenty20 International (T20I) squad for the 2021 ICC Men's T20 World Cup Americas Qualifier tournament in Antigua. He made his T20I debut on 7 November 2021, for the United States against Belize.

In June 2019, he was named in a 30-man training squad for the United States cricket team, ahead of the Regional Finals of the 2018–19 ICC T20 World Cup Americas Qualifier tournament in Bermuda. The following month, he was one of twelve players to sign a three-month central contract with USA Cricket. In November 2019, he was named in the United States' squad for the 2019–20 Regional Super50 tournament. On 11 November 2019, he made his debut for the United States, against Guyana.

Ian Holland later left international cricket because he frequently missed USA international cricket commitment. He focused on English county cricket and scheduling conflicts with his county cricket duties for Hampshire. but he has been praised as a key talent for USA with a strong "change-of-pace" skillset.
