= Andries Gous =

South African-American cricketer (born 1993)

Personal information
- Full name: Andries Gustav Stephanus Gous
- Born: November 24, 1993 (age 32); Welkom, South Africa
- Batting: Right-handed
- Role: Wicket-keeper

International information
- National side: United States (2024–present)
- ODI debut (cap 48): September 18, 2024 v UAE
- Last ODI: October 28, 2025 v UAE
- ODI shirt no.: 68
- T20I debut (cap 31): April 7, 2024 v Canada
- Last T20I: February 10, 2026 v Pakistan
- T20I shirt no.: 68

Domestic team information
- Years: Team
- 2011–2020: Free State
- 2016–2021: Knights
- 2021-2022: Seattle Thunderbolts
- 2023–present: Dallas Mustangs
- 2023–present: Washington Freedom
- 2024: Trinbago Knight Riders
- 2024: Pokhara Avengers
- 2025-present: Islamabad United
- 2025: Antigua & Barbuda Falcons
- 2026: Edinburgh Castle Rockers

Career statistics
Competition	ODI	T20I	FC	LA
Matches	14	27	60	71
Runs scored	405	770	3746	2,266
Batting average	31.15	30.80	41.62	36.54
100s/50s	0/4	0/6	7/21	3/14
Top score	83	81	256*	163*
Balls bowled	–	–	6	18
Wickets	–	–	0	2
Bowling average	–	–	–	4.50
5 wickets in innings	–	–	–	0
10 wickets in match	–	–	–	0
Best bowling	–	–	–	2/9
Catches/stumpings	3/0	7/1	136/5	53/4
- Source: Cricinfo, February 15, 2026

Andries Gustav Stephanus Gous (/ˈɑndrəs ˈɦəʊs/, AHN-drəs HAUS; born November 24, 1993) is a South African-American cricketer who plays for the Washington Freedom and the United States national cricket team.

== Early life ==
Gous was born on 24 November 1993 in Welkom, South Africa and grew up in Bloemfontein.

== Career ==
=== Domestic and T20 Career ===
Gous was included in the original Free State cricket team for the 2015 Africa T20 Cup. In August 2017, he was named in Jo'burg Giants' squad for the first season of the T20 Global League. The following month, he scored a century for Free State in the semi-final of the 2017 Africa T20 Cup against Namibia.

In September 2018, Gous was named in Free State's squad for the 2018 Africa T20 Cup. He was the joint-leading run-scorer for Free State in the tournament, with 155 runs in four matches. In September 2019, he was named in Free State's squad for the 2019–20 CSA Provincial T20 Cup.

In April 2021, Gous moved to the United States after signing a three-year deal to play cricket. In June 2021, he was selected to take part in the Minor League Cricket tournament in the United States following the players' draft.

In 2024, Gous was signed by Pokhara Avengers for 2024 Nepal Premier League. In December 2024, He became the first player to score century in the history of Nepal Premier League.

On 16 July 2026 During the MLC, Gous hit 132 runs off just 51 balls, making it the first century by an American player in the tournaments history, as well as Gous's personal highest score in all T20s. Along with Steve Smith in a T20 franchise record 241 run partnership, he helped the Freedom chase down the highest T20 score ever of 267 set by MI New York.

=== International career ===
In March 2024, Gous was named in USA's squad for their series against Canada. He made his Twenty20 International (T20I) debut for USA on April 7, 2024, against Canada. He started his International Twenty20 International (T20I) career with two back-to-back half centuries.

In January 2026, Gous was named in USA's squad for the 2026 T20 World Cup.
