= Mukhtar Ahmed (cricketer) =

Pakistani cricketer

Personal information
- Full name: Mukhtar Ahmed
- Born: 20 December 1992 (age 33); Sialkot, Punjab, Pakistan
- Batting: Right-handed
- Bowling: Legbreak Googly
- Role: Opening batsman

International information
- National side: Pakistan (2015)
- T20I debut (cap 61): 24 April 2015 v Bangladesh
- Last T20I: 1 August 2015 v Sri Lanka

Domestic team information
- Years: Team
- 2014: State Bank of Pakistan
- 2019–2023: Southern Punjab
- 2023-present: Washington Freedom

Career statistics
| Competition | T20I | FC | LA |
|---|---|---|---|
| Matches | 6 | 33 | 50 |
| Runs scored | 192 | 1,449 | 1,957 |
| Batting average | 32.00 | 24.55 | 41.63 |
| 100s/50s | 0/2 | 3/5 | 5/8 |
| Top score | 83 | 144 | 161 |
| Balls bowled | – | 634 | 512 |
| Wickets | – | 5 | 15 |
| Bowling average | – | 74.40 | 32.86 |
| 5 wickets in innings | – | 0 | 0 |
| 10 wickets in match | – | 0 | 0 |
| Best bowling | – | 1/3 | 3/40 |
| Catches/stumpings | 2/– | 23/– | 12/– |
- Source: Cricinfo, 14 April 2022

Mukhtar Ahmed (born 20 December 1992) is a Pakistani-born cricketer who played for the Pakistan national cricket team in 2015 before retiring in 2023 to join Washington Freedom in Major League Cricket.

== Domestic career ==
He was the leading run-scorer for Rawalpindi in the 2018–19 Quaid-e-Azam One Day Cup, with 434 runs in seven matches.

== International career ==
He made his Twenty20 International debut for Pakistan against Bangladesh on 24 April 2015. His first T20 international fifty came in his second match against Zimbabwe in Lahore on 22 May 2015. For this innings he was named man of the match. Two days later in the second match of two in the series, he once again scored a fifty and was again named man of the match, and finally won the player of the series award as well.
