= Obus Pienaar =

South African cricketer (born 1989)

Personal information
- Full name: Abraham Jacobus Pienaar
- Born: 12 December 1989 (age 36); Bloemfontein, South Africa

Domestic team information
- Years: Team
- 2026: Washington Freedom
- Source: Cricinfo, 5 November 2015

Abraham Jacobus Pienaar (born 12 December 1989) is a South African-born American cricketer who plays for the Washington Freedom. He was the leading run-scorer in the 2017–18 Sunfoil 3-Day Cup for South Western Districts, with 909 runs in ten matches. He was also the leading run-scorer in the 2018–19 CSA 3-Day Provincial Cup, with 957 runs in ten matches, and the leading run-scorer for South Western Districts in the 2018–19 CSA Provincial One-Day Challenge, with 505 runs in nine matches.

In September 2019, Pienaar was named in Northern Cape's squad for the 2019–20 CSA Provincial T20 Cup. In June 2021, he was selected to take part in the Minor League Cricket tournament in the United States following the players' draft.
