= Texas Super Kings =

Texas-based cricket franchise

- League: Major League Cricket

Personnel
- Captain: Faf du Plessis
- Coach: Stephen Fleming
- Owner: Chennai Super Kings Cricket; Anurag Jain; Ross Perot Jr.
- Manager: Russell Radhakrishnan

Team information
- City: Dallas, Texas, United States
- Colours: Yellow
- Founded: 2023; 3 years ago
- Home ground: Grand Prairie Stadium
- Capacity: 7,200 (expandable to 15,000)
- Official website: texassuperkings.com
T20 kit

The Texas Super Kings are an American professional Twenty20 cricket team based in the Dallas–Fort Worth metroplex that competes in Major League Cricket (MLC). The team's home ground is Grand Prairie Stadium. The stadium has a capacity of 7,200; it can be expanded to seat 15,000 for major events.

The team was announced in 2023 as one of six inaugural teams to play in the league. The team has two minor league affiliates – the Dallas Mustangs and the Dallas Xforia Giants, which both compete in Minor League Cricket (MiLC) alongside 24 other teams. The franchise is co-owned by Chennai Super Kings Cricket, Ross Perot Jr., and Anurag Jain.

The team is coached by Stephen Fleming and is captained by South African Faf du Plessis.

== History ==
=== Background ===
In November 2020, USA Cricket announced that ACE had acquired a 15-year lease for a former Minor League Baseball stadium to be renovated into a fully-fledged cricket stadium, which would host the Dallas franchise Major League Cricket team. Plans were reaffirmed two years later in December 2022, where MLC officially announced its 2023 season and the name of the Texas franchise home ground, Grand Prairie Stadium.

In May 2022, it was formally announced during a Series A and A1 fundraising round for Major League Cricket that Anurag Jain and Ross Perot Jr. – who were among many big-name investors such as Satya Nadella and Sanjay Parthasarathy – would co-own the Texas franchise cricket team.

In the buildup to the 2023 draft – which was held on March 19, the Texas franchise announced its partnership with the Chennai Super Kings. Following the draft, the team held a press conference wherein co-owner Anurag Jain, amongst Stephen Fleming and K.S. Viswanathan, publicly announced their team name – the Texas Super Kings, logo and coach for the first time. However, it was announced in late April that they had revamped their logo for it to look similar to the logos of the Chennai and Joburg Super Kings.

=== 2023 season ===
Prior to the launch of the official season, it was announced the MLC's inaugural domestic draft would take place on March 19, 2023. The Super Kings had the final pick of the first round draft and selected Rusty Theron, before adding Sami Aslam, Calvin Savage, and Milind Kumar with later selections. In June 2023, the Super Kings announced seven of their nine overseas signings, including Ambati Rayudu, Devon Conway, and Dwayne Bravo. In addition, they announced their full support staff lineup, including Albie Morkel and Eric Simons, among others. They subsequently announced that former South African skipper, Faf du Plessis, would captain the team and on July 5, selected Mohammad Mohsin as their domestic wildcard pick.

Rayudu withdrew from the tournament following the Board of Control of Cricket in India's proposal of a year-long "cooling-off period" for recently retired players and his place taken by Imran Tahir.

In the opening match of the tournament on July 13, the Super Kings recorded a 69-run win over the Los Angeles Knight Riders. This was followed by a 6-run defeat to the Washington Freedom in their second match, a 17-run victory over MI New York and an 8-wicket defeat to the Seattle Orcas.

A three-wicket win over the San Francisco Unicorns ensured a top-two finish going into the playoffs, but losses to both Seattle and New York saw the team eliminated.

=== 2024 season ===
Ahead of the start of the 2024 season on July 5, on February 15, 2024, the Super Kings released a list of retentions for overseas players, including captain Faf du Plessis, Devon Conway and Mitchell Santner. During the domestic players' draft, the Texas Super Kings selected Joshua Tromp and Raj Nannan. Outside of the draft, the team announced a series of overseas signings from New Zealander Daryl Mitchell to Australian Marcus Stoinis. Mitchell however, following an injury, was ruled out of the season and was replaced by Afghan cricketer Noor Ahmad. The Super Kings reached the playoffs for the second time in a row after winning three of the seven group stage matches.

== Current squad ==
- Players with international caps are listed in **bold**.

No.	Name	Nationality	Birth date	Batting style	Bowling style	Notes
Batters
	**Faf du Plessis**	South Africa	13 July 1984 (age 42)	Right-handed	Right arm leg-break	Captain
	**Rilee Rossouw**	South Africa	9 October 1989 (age 36)	Left-handed	Right arm off break	
	**Milind Kumar**	United States	15 February 1991 (age 35)	Right-handed	Right-arm off break	
	**Saiteja Mukkamalla**	United States	9 April 2004 (age 22)	Right-handed	Right-arm off break	
Wicket-keepers
	**Smit Patel**	United States	16 May 1993 (age 33)	Right-handed	—N/a	
	**Donovan Ferreira**	South Africa	21 July 1998 (age 28)	Right-handed	Right arm off break	
All-rounders
	Calvin Savage	United States	4 January 1993 (age 33)	Right-handed	Right-arm fast	
	**Shubham Ranjane**	United States	26 March 1994 (age 32)	Right-handed	Right-arm medium	
	**Akeal Hosein**	West Indies	25 April 1993 (age 33)	Left-handed	Slow left-arm orthodox	
	**Wiaan Mulder**	South Africa	19 February 1998 (age 28)	Right-handed	Right-arm medium	
	Joshua Tromp	United States	1 April 2001 (age 25)	Right-handed	Right-arm medium	
	Amshi de Silva	United States	11 November 2001 (age 24)	Right-handed	Right-arm medium	
Bowlers
	**Hardus Viljoen**	South Africa	6 March 1989 (age 37)	Right-handed	Right arm fast	
	**Keshav Maharaj**	South Africa	7 February 1990 (age 36)	Right-handed	Slow left-arm orthodox	
	**Adam Milne**	New Zealand	13 April 1992 (age 34)	Right-handed	Right arm fast	
	**Nandre Burger**	South Africa	11 August 1995 (age 30)	Left-handed	Left arm fast-medium	
	Abhimanyu Lamba	United States	31 October 1995 (age 30)	Right-handed	Right-arm medium	
	**Mohammad Mohsin**	United States	15 April 1996 (age 30)	Left-handed	Right-arm leg spin	

== Administration and support staff ==
Texas Super Kings staff
Position	Name
Head Coach	Stephen Fleming
Assistant coach	Albie Morkel
Bowling Coach	Sridharan Sriram
Physiotherapist	Tommy Simsek
Strength and Conditioning Coach	Jade Roberts
Team Manager	Russell Radhakrishnan

== Seasons ==
=== Standings ===
Year	League standing	Final standing
2023	2nd	Challenger
2024	3rd	Challenger
2025	2nd	Challenger

- C: champions
- RU: runner-up
- CH: team eliminated in the Challenger stage of the play-offs

=== Season summary (Note: Play-offs/Knockout matches are not included) ===
Year	Played	Won	Lost	NR (Note: NR indicates "no result", while abandoned matches are also indicated as "no result".)
2023	7	3	4	0
2024	7	3	2	2
2025	10	7	3	0
Total	24	13	9	2
Source: ESPNCricinfo

== See also ==
- Chennai Super Kings
- Joburg Super Kings
