= San Francisco Unicorns =

San Francisco-based cricket franchise

- League: Major League Cricket

Personnel
- Captain: Matthew Short
- Coach: Cameron White
- Owner: Anand Rajaraman; Venky Harinarayan
- Manager: David Mann

Team information
- City: San Francisco, California, United States
- Colours: Orange and Blue
- Founded: 2023; 3 years ago
- Home ground: Oakland Coliseum
- Capacity: 12,000
- Official website: www.sfunicorns.com
T20 kit

The San Francisco Unicorns are an American professional Twenty20 cricket team based in the San Francisco Bay Area that competes in Major League Cricket (MLC). The team's home ground is the Oakland Coliseum.

In 2023, it was announced as one of the six teams to participate in the league's inaugural season. The team is owned by Anand Rajaraman and Venky Harinarayan, co-founders of Cambrian ventures. In March 2023, Cricket Victoria announced their partnership with the Unicorns for the opening season.

== History ==
Cricket has been growing steadily in San Jose, thanks to cricket clubs like the Northern California Cricket Alliance. Looking at these growing numbers, the county supervisors have been planning to build a stadium in the Santa Clara Fairgrounds. The Unicorns' minor league affiliate are the Bay Blazers, which competes in MLC's developmental league Minor League Cricket.

In March 2023, the team ownership, name, and logo was unveiled prior to the inaugural MLC domestic draft. The team is owned by Anand Rajaraman and Venky Harinarayan, and the team partnered with the Australia's Cricket Victoria for the first season. Justin Gaele, MLC tournament director emphasizing about the Unicorns, told that the Bay Area could serve as the launchpad for cricket in the United States.

=== 2023 season ===
The Unicorns signed the first overseas player signed in the inaugural MLC — Australian international Aaron Finch. He was subsequently announced as the captain. Corey Anderson, Liam Plunkett, Tajinder Singh and Smit Patel were prominent names picked in the domestic round of the draft; Marcus Stoinis was also announced as another overseas signing by the Unicorns. In May 2023, the team announced direct signing of South African pacer, Lungi Ngidi. On June 20, 2023, Unicorns announced former Australian all-rounder Shane Watson as their head coach for the 2023 season.

The team finished fifth in the tournament, winning just two of their five league matches. They were tied on points with the MI New York, but could not advance to the play-offs due to their negative net run rate.

=== 2024 season ===
In December 2023, it was announced that the second season of the tournament would begin on July 4, 2024, four days after the conclusion of the 2024 ICC Men's T20 World Cup. The date was later moved to July 5.

On February 15, 2024, the overseas players Harris Rauf and Finn Allen were retained. On March 1, 2024, the domestic player retention list was announced. Corey Anderson, Liam Plunkett, Carmi le Roux, Brody Couch, and Sanjay Krishnamurthi were among the domestic players that were retained.

The domestic players' draft was virtually held on March 21, 2024, with a total of 20 players being picked by the teams over 10 rounds. An additional draft is scheduled for June 16 in order for teams to complete their squads.

Hassan Khan, Tajinder Singh, Karima Gore, and Jahmar Hamilton were prominent names picked in the domestic round of the draft.

Matthew Short, Jake Fraser-McGurk, Matt Henry, and Josh Inglis were also announced as direct overseas signing by the Unicorns for their second season.

In June 2024, the team announced direct signing of Australia Test and ODI skipper Pat Cummins. After signing a four-year contract with the team, Cummins is expected to fill in the leadership vacuum at the Unicorns after Aaron Finch's retirement. He was subsequently announced as the captain.

Pat Cummins has signed a four-year contract with San Francisco Unicorns, becoming one of the highest-profile players on the roster of a Major League Cricket (MLC) franchise.

=== 2026 season ===
Ahead of the 2026 season, the Unicorns retained captain Matthew Short, Finn Allen, Haris Rauf, Cooper Connolly, Xavier Bartlett, Hassan Khan and other key players, while adding Aakarshit Gomel, Zia-ul-Haq, Muhammad Ilyas, Saideep Ganesh and Anirudh Imanuel through the Major League Cricket draft.

The Unicorns also signed Aaron Hardie, Oliver Peake and Lhuan-dre Pretorius ahead of the tournament. After Cooper Connolly was ruled out through injury, Connor Esterhuizen joined the squad as his replacement.

The Unicorns began their campaign with a victory over Los Angeles Knight Riders, followed by wins against Texas Super Kings, MI New York and Washington Freedom to extend their unbeaten start. They later defeated Seattle Orcas and continued their impressive run at the top of the standings before suffering their first defeat of the season against Los Angeles Knight Riders. They quickly bounced back with victories over MI New York and Seattle Orcas, the latter confirming a top-of-the-table finish at the end of the league stage.

Having finished first in the league stage, the Unicorns advanced directly to the Qualifier, where they were defeated by Los Angeles Knight Riders, forcing them into the Challenger. There, despite an unbeaten century from Matthew Short, they suffered a narrow seven-run defeat to Washington Freedom, ending their campaign one win short of reaching the final.

== Current squad ==
- Players with international caps are listed in **bold**.

San Francisco Unicorns 2026
Name	Nat.	Date of Birth	Batting Style	Bowling Style	Year signed	Notes
Batters
**Matthew Short** (c)	Australia	November 8, 1995 (age 31)	Right-handed	Right-arm off break	2024	Direct signing
**Finn Allen**	New Zealand	April 22, 1999 (age 27)	Right-handed	Right-arm off break	2023	Direct signing
Oliver Peake	Australia	February 6, 2006 (age 20)	Left-handed		2026	Direct signing
All-rounders
**Aaron Hardie**	Australia	January 7, 1999 (age 27)	Right-handed	Right-arm medium-fast	2026	Direct signing
**Ravichandran Ashwin**	India	September 17, 1986 (age 40)	Right-handed	Right-arm off break	2026	Direct signing
**Hassan Khan**	United States	September 5, 1998 (age 28)	Left-handed	Slow left-arm orthodox	2023	
Sanjay Krishnamurthi	United States	June 2, 2003 (age 23)	Right-handed	Right-arm off break	2023	
**Hammad Azam**	Pakistan	March 16, 1991 (age 35)	Right-handed	Right-arm medium-fast	2023	
Aakarshit Gomel	United States		Left-handed	Right-arm off break	2026	Draft
Anirudh Immanuel	United States				2026	Draft
Wicket-keepers
**Lhuan-dré Pretorius**	South Africa	March 27, 2006 (age 20)	Left-handed		2026	Direct signing
Saideep Ganesh	United States		Right-handed		2026	Draft
Bowlers
**Haris Rauf**	Pakistan	November 7, 1993 (age 33)	Right-handed	Right-arm fast	2023	Direct signing
**Xavier Bartlett**	Australia	December 17, 1998 (age 27)	Right-handed	Right-arm fast-medium	2024	Direct signing
Brody Couch	Australia	December 5, 1999 (age 26)	Right-handed	Right-arm fast-medium	2023	
Juanoy Drysdale	West Indies	September 8, 2000 (age 26)	Right-handed	Right-arm medium-fast	2023	
**Zia-ul-Haq**	Pakistan	November 3, 1994 (age 32)	Left-handed	Left-arm fast-medium	2026	Draft
Mohammad Ilyas	United States	July 19, 1999 (age 27)	Right-handed	Right-arm fast-medium	2026	Draft

== Administration and support staff ==
San Francisco Unicorns staff
Position	Name
Head coach	Cameron White
Assistant coach	Ashwell Prince
Assistant coach	Chamu Chibhabha
Team manager	David Mann
Strength and conditioning	Saeed Ajmal
Physiotherapist	Jacob Oram

== Seasons ==
=== Seasons ===
Year	League standing	Final standing
2023	5th out of 6	League stage
2024	2nd out of 6	Runners up
2025	3 out of 6	SF
2026	1st out of 6	SF

- C: champions
- RU: runner-up
- SF team qualified for the semi-final stage of the competition

=== Season summary ===
Year	Played	Wins	Losses	Ties/NR
2023	5	2	3	0
2024	10	6	3	1
2025
2026	12	6	6	0
Source: ESPNCricinfo

Note:

- NR indicates No result.
- Abandoned matches are indicated as no result.
