= Seattle Orcas =

Seattle-based cricket franchise

- League: Major League Cricket

Personnel
- Captain: Marcus Stoinis
- Coach: Sourav Ganguly
- Owner: GMR Group; Ashok Krishnamurthi; Satya Nadella; Sanjay Parthasarathy Samir Bodas
- Manager: Bala Nagarajan

Team information
- Colours: Black, White, Light Green, and Orange
- Founded: 2023; 3 years ago
- Official website: Seattle Orcas
T20 kit

The Seattle Orcas are an American professional Twenty20 cricket team based in the Seattle metropolitan area that competes in Major League Cricket (MLC).

The franchise was announced in 2023 as one of six inaugural franchises to play in the league. The team is owned by an investor group including Satya Nadella, Soma Somasegar, Samir Bodas, Ashok Krishnamurthi, and Sanjay Parthasarathy—and the GMR Group. The Orcas have a minor league affiliate called the Seattle Thunderbolts, who play in Minor League Cricket and were the 2022 champions. The team is coached by former Indian cricketer Pravin Amre.

== History ==
=== Background ===
In November 2021, the Bellevue City Council passed a resolution to support further research into the cost and feasibility for a cricket facility in Bellevue or on county-owned land at Marymoor Park. This was followed by a similar resolution that the Redmond City Council adopted in January 2022. A motion of support to develop a cricket facility in Marymoor Park was then passed by King County in February 2022. In May 2022, Major League Cricket announced that Somasegar and Microsoft CEO Satya Nadella were among some of the lead investors launching Major League Cricket in the U.S.

In March 2023, MLC unveiled the team ownership, name, and logo prior to the inaugural MLC domestic draft. It was also announced that the team would partner with the GMR Group, who co-owns the Delhi Capitals of the Indian Premier League. Co-owner Somasegar stated that the Orcas name and colors "pay tribute to our local community [of Seattle] that has helped build that spirit of support". On May 27, 2023, it was revealed that the Orcas had revamped their logo to emphasize its focus on cricket.

=== 2023 season ===
Prior to the launch of the official season, it was announced the MLC's inaugural domestic draft would take place on March 19, 2023. The Orcas had the first pick of the draft and selected Thunderbolts captain Harmeet Singh as their first overall draft pick, before adding the likes of Shehan Jayasuriya, Shubham Ranjane, and Angelo Perera in later draft selections. In addition, Shimron Hetmyer and Quinton de Kock were announced as some of the team's overseas signings during the draft. Over the following months, several more overseas signings occurred, including the signings of Dasun Shanaka, Wayne Parnell, Andrew Tye, Dwaine Pretorius, Imad Wasim, and Heinrich Klaasen—amongst others.

The team also announced their lineup of support staff, with Johan Botha coming on board as the team's bowling coach, Ross Taylor as the team's batting coach, Pravin Amre as the team's head coach, and Jarrod Harkness as the team analyst. Prior to the start of the season, Shimron Hetmyer and Sikandar Raza—who were both included in the Orcas squad—withdrew from MLC due to it clashing with other tournaments such as the Ashes and the Zim Afro T10.

In the start to their inaugural campaign, the Orcas' went top of the table by recording a 5-wicket win over the Washington Freedom, a 35-run win over the San Francisco Unicorns, and an 8-wicket win over the Texas Super Kings. The Orcas' winning streak was snapped, however, during a 2-wicket defeat to the Los Angeles Knight Riders. A 2-wicket win over MI New York assured the Orcas' a first-place finish going into the finals nevertheless.

After a 9-wicket win over the Texas Super Kings in the qualifier, the Orcas suffered a 7-wicket loss in the 2023 MLC final to MI New York.

=== 2024 season ===
In December 2023, it was announced that the second season of the tournament would begin on July 4, 2024, four days after the conclusion of the 2024 ICC Men's T20 World Cup. This was later pushed back a day to July 5.

Ahead of the start of the season, on February 15, 2024, the team released a list of retained overseas players which included the likes of Quinton de Kock, Imad Wasim, Heinrich Klaasen, and captain Wayne Parnell. On March 1, 2024, the team released a list of retained domestic players which included the likes of Harmeet Singh, Shubham Ranjane, Cameron Gannon, Shehan Jayasuriya, and Nauman Anwar. During the season's domestic players' draft on March 21, 2024, a total of 3 players were picked by the team over 10 rounds. Following the draft, the team announced a slew of overseas signings from New Zealander Michael Bracewell to Vincentian cricketer Obed McCoy. Even South African Ryan Rickelton and Nandre Burger played that season, alongside Pakistani Zaman Khan.

In the season opener, the Orcas were routed by New York in a six-wicket drubbing, before a commanding nine-wicket win led by Ryan Rickelton's unbeaten century over Los Angeles. Seattle's victory over Los Angeles would be the team's only win of the season, with the Orcas going 0–4 in a comprehensive 5-wicket defeat to Washington, a 23-run loss to San Francisco despite Shehan Jayasuriya's half-century, a 4-wicket loss set up by Unmukt Chand's 62 to Los Angeles, and another 6-wicket drubbing to Washington, all but ensuring the team's elimination. In the final match of their campaign, the Orcas closed out with a fifth straight loss to Texas as Ottniel Baartman's 3-fer and Calvin Savage's unbeaten 45 enshrined Seattle's last-place finish.

=== 2025 season ===
Amidst the team's last-place finish in 2024, the Orcas underwent a massive squad shift as they retained just 6 players ahead of the season's draft. At the draft, the team signed domestic bulwarks Jessy Singh, Shayan Jahangir, Sujit Nayak, Rahul Jariwala, and Steven Taylor. They also signed Caribbean all-rounder Kyle Mayers and Shimron Hetmyer. 2 more signings were added in March and they were Afghani Fazalhaq Farooqi and Zimbabwean Sikandar Raza. In April, the team signed Afghani Gulbadin Naib and Afghan spin wizard Waqar Salamkheil. They also signed former Australian cricketer David Warner. One of the last signing was West Indies pacer Obed McCoy.

=== 2026 season ===
Ahead of the start of the season, the Seattle Orcas made several changes to their squad. The team signed Australian all-rounder Marcus Stoinis as a signing for the 2026 season. They also added overseas players including Ottniel Baartman, Tim Seifert, Matthew Breetzke, Tim Robinson, Tanveer Sangha, and Lungi Ngidi to strengthen the squad. The team also appointed Marcus Stoinis as their team captain.

Seattle began their campaign with a 7-wicket defeat to Texas. They then won their second match by 5 wickets against Washington. After that, they lost by 81 runs to Los Angeles and they won their next match against Washington by 88 runs. Then, they had a really close match against San Francisco and they beat Seattle by 2 wickets. After that, they gained their revenge against Los Angeles by defeating them by 20 runs. The next match was another close one and they lost to MI New York by 5 runs. Then, they got their revenge against TSK by defeating them by 9 runs.

== Current squad ==
- Players with international caps are listed in **bold**.

Seattle Orcas 2026
Name	Nat.	Date of Birth	Batting Style	Bowling Style	Year signed	Notes
Batters
**Marcus Stoinis** (c)	Australia	August 16, 1989 (age 37)	Right-handed	Right-arm medium	2026	Direct signing
**Tim Seifert**	New Zealand	December 14, 1994 (age 31)	Right-handed		2024	Direct signing
**Shimron Hetmyer**	West Indies	December 26, 1996 (age 29)	Left-handed	Right-arm leg break	2026	Direct signing
**Matthew Breetzke**	South Africa	November 3, 1998 (age 27)	Right-handed	Right-arm medium	2026	Direct signing
**Tim Robinson**	New Zealand	July 5, 2002 (age 24)	Right-handed		2026	Direct signing
Sharad Lumba	United States		Right-handed		2023	
All-rounders
**Dasun Shanaka**	Sri Lanka	September 9, 1991 (age 35)	Right-handed	Right-arm medium-fast	2026	Direct signing
**Harmeet Singh**	United States	September 7, 1992 (age 34)	Left-handed	Slow left-arm orthodox	2023	
Shehan Jayasuriya	United States	January 12, 1992 (age 34)	Left-handed	Slow left-arm orthodox	2023	
Ali Sheikh	United States	October 7, 2002 (age 24)	Left-handed	Slow left-arm orthodox	2023	
Wicket-keepers
Rahul Jariwala	United States		Right-handed		2023	
**Shayan Jahangir**	United States	December 24, 1994 (age 31)	Right-handed		2024	
Bowlers
**Lungi Ngidi**	South Africa	March 29, 1996 (age 30)	Right-handed	Right-arm fast	2026	Direct signing
**Ottniel Baartman**	South Africa	March 18, 1993 (age 33)	Right-handed	Right-arm fast-medium	2026	Direct signing
**Tanveer Sangha**	Australia	November 26, 2001 (age 24)	Right-handed	Right-arm leg break	2026	Direct signing
Ayan Desai	United States		Right-handed	Right-arm medium-fast	2024	
Jessy Singh	United States	March 11, 1993 (age 33)	Right-handed	Right-arm fast-medium	2023	
Cameron Gannon	United States	January 23, 1989 (age 37)	Right-handed	Right-arm fast-medium	2024	
Sujit Nayak	United States		Right-handed	Right-arm medium	2023	

== Administration and support staff ==
Seattle Orcas staff
Position	Name
Head Coach	Vacant
Bowling Coach	Vacant
Batting Coach	Parthiv Patel
Fielding Coach	Ramakrishnan Sridhar
Team Manager	Sanjay Stanley
Strength and Conditioning Coach	Vacant
Physiotherapist	Tom O’Malley
Team Analyst	James Maby
Assistant Coach	Vacant

== Seasons ==
=== Seasons ===
Year	League standing	Final standing
2023	1st	Runners-up
2024	6th	League stage
2025	5th	League stage
2026	5th	League stage

- C: champions
- RU: runner-up
- SF team qualified for the semi-final stage of the competition

=== Season summary ===
Year	Played	Wins	Losses	Tied/NR (Note: NR indicates "no result", while abandoned matches are also indicated as "no result".)
2023	7	5	2	0
2024	7	1	6	0
2025	10	3	7	0
2026	10	4	6	0
Source: ESPNCricinfo
