= MI New York =

New York-based cricket franchise

- Nickname: MINY
- League: Major League Cricket

Personnel
- Captain: Nicholas Pooran
- Coach: Mark Boucher
- Owner: Reliance Industries

Team information
- Colours: Blue and Gold
- Founded: 2023; 3 years ago

History
- Major League Cricket wins: 2 (2023, 2025)
- Official website: MI New York
T20I kit

MI New York is an American professional Twenty20 cricket team based in New York City that competes in Major League Cricket (MLC). The team was established in June 2023 as one of six inaugural teams.

MI New York is owned by Indiawin Sports, who also owns teams that compete in the IPL, SA20, and ILT20. It has a minor league affiliate, the Manhattan Yorkers, that competes in Minor League Cricket (MiLC). During the 2023 season, the team defeated the Seattle Orcas in the finals to take home the inaugural title. The team is coached by former South African spinner Robin Peterson.

== History ==
=== Background ===
In March 2023, it was reported that the Mukesh Ambani-owned Indiawin Sports would be the primary owner of Major League Cricket's New York franchise, called MI New York. Nita Ambani later remarked in a press release that she was "thrilled" about the establishment of the team and the opportunity to introduce cricket to New York.

=== 2023 season ===
MLC's inaugural domestic players' draft was held on March 19, 2023, at NASA's Johnson Space Center in Houston, ahead of the start of the season on July 4. The team picked, amongst others, American mainstays Steven Taylor and Monank Patel.

MI New York's full squad was released on June 14, with Afghanistan's Rashid Khan, New Zealand's Trent Boult, and South Africa's Kagiso Rabada all in the mix. The team also appointed West Indies' Kieron Pollard as their team captain.

During the season, New York began their campaign with a 22-run defeat to San Francisco. This was followed by a 105-run win over Los Angeles in their second game, a 17-run loss to Texas in their third, and a 8-wicket win over Washington in their fourth. In their final group stage game, they lost to table-toppers Seattle by 2 wickets. Despite the loss, they nevertheless still qualified for the play-offs. In the play-offs, New York recorded back-to-back victories against Washington and Texas in the Eliminator and Challenger matches, respectively, to go to the finals, where they defeated Seattle to claim the inaugural title.

== Current squad ==
- Players with international caps are listed in **bold**.

Position	Name	Nationality	Date of birth (age)	Batting style	Bowling style	Year signed	Notes
Batters	**Monank Patel**	United States	March 1, 1993 (age 33)	Right-handed		2023	
Batters	Agni Chopra	United States	November 4, 1998 (age 28)	Left-handed	Right-arm off-spin	2025	Draft Signing
Batters	Sharad Lumba	United States	September 10, 1989 (age 37)	Right-handed	Right-arm off-spin	2025	Draft Signing
All-rounders	**Kieron Pollard**	West Indies	May 12, 1987 (age 39)	Right-handed	Right-arm medium-fast	2023	
All-rounders	**Nosthush Kenjige**	United States	March 2, 1991 (age 35)	Right-handed	Slow left-arm orthodox	2023	
All-rounders	**Rashid Khan**	Afghanistan	September 20, 1998 (age 28)	Right-handed	Right-arm leg break	2023	
All-rounders	Heath Richards	United States	March 1, 2001 (age 25)	Right-handed	Right-arm fast	2024	
All-rounders	Sunny Patel	United States	April 10, 1987 (age 39)	Right-handed	Right-arm wrist spin	2024	
All-rounders	Kunwarjeet Singh	United States	February 21, 2000 (age 26)	Left-handed	Right-arm medium	2025	Draft Signing
All-rounders	Tajinder Singh	United States	May 25, 1992 (age 34)	Right-handed	Right-arm off-spin	2025	Draft Signing
All-rounders	**Michael Bracewell**	New Zealand	February 14, 1991 (age 35)	Left-handed	Right-arm off-spin	2025	Direct Signing
All-rounders	**Azmatullah Omarzai**	Afghanistan	March 24, 2000 (age 26)	Right-handed	Right-arm medium fast	2025	Direct Signing
All-rounders	**George Linde**	South Africa	December 4, 1991 (age 34)	Left-handed	Left-arm orthodox	2025	Direct Signing
Bowlers	**Ehsan Adil**	United States	March 15, 1993 (age 33)	Right-handed	Right-arm fast-medium	2023	
Bowlers	**Trent Boult**	New Zealand	July 22, 1989 (age 37)	Right-handed	Left-arm fast-medium	2023	
Bowlers	Rushil Ugarkar	United States	June 30, 2003 (age 23)	Right-handed	Right-arm fast	2024	
Bowlers	**Naveen ul-Haq**	Afghanistan	September 23, 1999 (age 27)	Right-handed	Right-arm fast medium	2025	Direct Signing
Wicket-keepers	**Nicholas Pooran**	West Indies	October 2, 1995 (age 31)	Left-handed		2023	Captain
Wicket-keepers	**Quinton de Kock**	South Africa	December 17, 1992 (age 33)	Left-handed		2025	Direct Signing

== Administration and support staff ==
MI New York staff
Position	Name
Head Coach	Mark Boucher
Bowling Coach	Mitchell McClenaghan
Batting Coach	J Arun Kumar
Fielding Coach	Carl Hopkinson
Director of Cricket	Rahul Sanghvi
Strength & Conditioning Coach	Pratik Kadam
Physiotherapist	Jason Pilgrim
Sports Massage Therapist	Robert Gibson
Asst. Massage Therapist	Zep Nicholas
Data Performance Manager	L Varun
Team Manager	Prashant Jangam
General Manager	Anand Tummala

== Performance ==
=== Standings ===
Year	League standing	Final standing
2023	4th	C
2024	4th	SF
2025	4th	C

- C: champions
- RU: runner-up
- SF: team qualified for the semi-final stage of the competition

=== Season summary ===
Year	Played	Wins	Losses	Tied/NR (Note: NR indicates "no result", while abandoned matches are also indicated as "no result".)
2023	8	5	3	0
2024	8	2	5	1
2025	13	6	7	0
Source: ESPNCricinfo

== Affiliated teams ==
- Mumbai Indians
- Mumbai Indians (WPL)
- MI Cape Town
- MI Emirates
- MI London
