= 2024 Major League Cricket season =

Second season of Major League Cricket

2024 Major League Cricket
- Dates: July 5 – 28, 2024
- Administrator(s): American Cricket Enterprises; USA Cricket
- Cricket format: Twenty20
- Tournament format(s): Round-robin and playoffs
- Champions: Washington Freedom (1st title)
- Runners-up: San Francisco Unicorns
- Participants: 6
- Matches: 25
- Player of the series: Travis Head (Washington Freedom)
- Most runs: Faf du Plessis (Texas Super Kings) (420)
- Most wickets: Saurabh Netravalkar (Washington Freedom) (15)
- Official website: Major League Cricket

The 2024 Major League Cricket (also known as MLC 2024, or for sponsorship reasons as 2024 Cognizant Major League Cricket) was the second season of Major League Cricket, a franchise Twenty20 cricket league established in 2019 by American Cricket Enterprises (ACE) in the United States. The season was hosted, as was the case the previous season, at two venues: Grand Prairie Stadium in Grand Prairie, Texas and Church Street Park in Morrisville, North Carolina. The season was played from July 5 to 28, 2024, with the Washington Freedom defeating the San Francisco Unicorns by 96 runs to win the tournament.

MI New York were the defending champions.

== Background ==
In December 2023, it was announced that the second season of the tournament would begin on July 5, 2024, four days after the conclusion of the 2024 ICC Men's T20 World Cup. This was later moved back a day to July 5. It was also reported that matches would be played at Grand Prairie Stadium, alongside other venues. By March 2024, MLC had announced that they had signed Cognizant to serve as the season's title sponsor.

On February 15, 2024, the overseas players' retention lists were announced, with the number of overseas slots having been upped to nine. In the following months, teams would go on to select further overseas players, including Australian cricketers Steven Smith and Travis Head. The domestic players' draft was virtually held on March 21, 2024, with a total of 20 players being picked by teams over 10 rounds. An additional draft was scheduled for June 16 for teams to complete their squads.

The season schedule was released by MLC on May 7, with defending champions MI New York facing the Seattle Orcas in the season opener, and the final set for July 28 at Grand Prairie Stadium. Later that month, MLC announced that they had obtained official List A status for all tournament fixtures, becoming the second Associate-run league to have it alongside the ILT20.

== Teams ==
All the six teams from the previous season took part this season.

Teams in the 2024 Major League Cricket
Franchise	Captain	Head coach
Los Angeles Knight Riders	Sunil Narine	Phil Simmons
MI New York	Kieron Pollard	Robin Peterson
San Francisco Unicorns	Corey Anderson	Shane Watson
Seattle Orcas	Wayne Parnell	Pravin Amre
Texas Super Kings	Faf du Plessis	Stephen Fleming
Washington Freedom	Steve Smith	Ricky Ponting

== Squads ==
A minimum of 16 and a maximum of 19 players can be selected by teams with a cap of nine overseas players. The teams also can retain any domestic players during the retention window, which was open until February 29, 2024. Teams were allowed to select any remaining domestic players during MLC's domestic draft, which was held on March 21, 2024, and a supplementary draft, which was held on June 16.

Los Angeles Knight Riders	MI New York	San Francisco Unicorns	Seattle Orcas	Texas Super Kings	Washington Freedom
Sunil Narine (c); Saif Badar; Unmukt Chand; Derone Davis; Corné Dry; Adithya Ganesh; Spencer Johnson; Ali Khan; Nitish Kumar; Jason Roy; Andre Russell; Matthew Tromp; Shadley van Schalkwyk; Adam Zampa; Shakib Al Hasan; David Miller; Joshua Little; Waqar Salamkheil; Alex Carey; Chaitanya Bishnoi	Kieron Pollard (c); Ehsan Adil; Trent Boult; Dewald Brevis; Ruben Clinton; Tim David; Shayan Jahangir; Nosthush Kenjige; Rashid Khan; Anrich Nortje; Monank Patel; Nicholas Pooran; Kagiso Rabada; Heath Richards; Romario Shepherd; Steven Taylor; Rushil Ugarkar; Sunny Patel	Corey Anderson (c); Pat Cummins; Finn Allen; Brody Couch; Karima Gore; Jahmar Hamilton; Hassan Khan; Sanjay Krishnamurthi; Carmi le Roux; Liam Plunkett; Haris Rauf; Matthew Short; Tajinder Singh; Josh Inglis; Matt Henry; Jake Fraser-McGurk; Sherfane Rutherford; Abrar Ahmed	Wayne Parnell (c); Nauman Anwar; Hammad Azam; Michael Bracewell; Nandre Burger; Quinton de Kock; Ayan Desai; Cameron Gannon; Shehan Jayasuriya; Heinrich Klaasen; Shubham Ranjane; Ali Sheikh; Harmeet Singh; ~~Nathan Ellis~~; Imad Wasim; Ryan Rickelton; ~~Lance Morris~~; ~~Obed McCoy~~; Aaron Jones; Zaman Khan	Faf du Plessis (c); Dwayne Bravo; Devon Conway; Aaron Hardie; Milind Kumar; Aiden Markram; ~~Daryl Mitchell~~ (Note: Unavailable due to injury); Noor Ahmad (Note: Replacement player); Saiteja Mukkamalla; Mohammad Mohsin; Raj Nannan; Mitchell Santner; Calvin Savage; Zia Shahzad; Cameron Stevenson; Joshua Tromp; Zia-ul-Haq; Naveen ul-Haq; Marcus Stoinis; ~~Gerald Coetzee~~; Ottniel Baartman	Steve Smith (c); Travis Head; Glenn Maxwell; Andries Gous; Lockie Ferguson; Andrew Tye; Jack Edwards; Saurabh Netravalkar; Obus Pienaar; Rachin Ravindra; Mukhtar Ahmed; Amila Aponso; Akhilesh Bodugum; Justin Dill; Ian Holland; Akeal Hosein; Marco Jansen; Lahiru Milantha; Yasir Mohammad

== Venues ==
Matches were held at two venues, Grand Prairie Stadium with a capacity of 7,200 located in Grand Prairie, Texas, and Church Street Park with a capacity of 3,500, located in Morrisville, North Carolina.

== Points table ==
Pos	Team	Pld	W	L	NR	Pts	NRR	Qualification
1	Washington Freedom (C)	7	5	1	1	11	1.891	Advanced to Qualifier
2	San Francisco Unicorns	7	5	1	1	11	0.588	Advanced to Qualifier
3	Texas Super Kings	7	3	2	2	8	0.604	Advanced to Eliminator
4	MI New York	7	2	4	1	5	−0.451	Advanced to Eliminator
5	Los Angeles Knight Riders	7	2	4	1	5	−0.710	
6	Seattle Orcas	7	1	6	0	2	−1.312	

Source: ESPNCricinfo
(C) Champions

== League stage ==
Match 1
July 5, 2024
3:30 PM (D/N)
Scorecard

Seattle Orcas; 108 (19.1 overs)	v	MI New York; 111/4 (14.2 overs)
Shubham Ranjane 35 (31); Rashid Khan 3/22 (4 overs)		Nicholas Pooran 62* (37); Cameron Gannon 2/40 (3 overs)

MI New York won by 6 wickets
Church Street Park, Morrisville
Umpires: Marais Erasmus (SA) and Rushane Samuels (WI)
Player of the match: Nicholas Pooran (MI New York)

- MI New York won the toss and elected to field.
- Ruben Clinton (MI New York) made his T20 debut.

Match 2
July 5, 2024
7:30 PM (N)
Scorecard

Los Angeles Knight Riders; 162/7 (20 overs)	v	Texas Super Kings (H); 150/8 (20 overs)
Unmukt Chand 68 (45); Zia-ul-Haq 2/16 (3 overs)		Devon Conway 53 (39); Ali Khan 4/33 (4 overs)

Los Angeles Knight Riders won by 12 runs
Grand Prairie Stadium, Dallas
Umpires: Gregory Brathwaite (WI) and Jermaine Lindo (USA)
Player of the match: Ali Khan (Los Angeles Knight Riders)

- Texas Super Kings won the toss and elected to field.
- Joshua Tromp (Texas Super Kings) made his T20 debut.

Match 3
July 6, 2024
3:00 PM
Scorecard

MI New York; 154/9 (20 overs)	v	Washington Freedom; 55/1 (7.4 overs)
Nicholas Pooran 44 (30); Saurabh Netravalkar 3/24 (4 overs)		Steve Smith 46* (28); Ehsan Adil 1/14 (2 overs)

Washington Freedom won by 4 runs (DLS method)
Church Street Park, Morrisville
Umpires: Marais Erasmus (SA) and Rushane Samuels (WI)
Player of the match: Saurabh Netravalkar (Washington Freedom)

- Washington Freedom won the toss and elected to field.
- Rain prevented any further play.
- Washington Freedom were 4 runs ahead of the DLS par score of 51 runs from 7.4 overs.

Match 4
July 7, 2024
7:30 PM (N)
Scorecard

Los Angeles Knight Riders; 165/6 (20 overs)	v	San Francisco Unicorns; 166/4 (15.2 overs)
Andre Russell 40* (25); Brody Couch 2/24 (4 overs)		Finn Allen 63 (37); Spencer Johnson 3/36 (4 overs)

San Francisco Unicorns won by 6 wickets
Grand Prairie Stadium, Dallas
Umpires: Gregory Brathwaite (WI) and Billy Taylor (USA)
Player of the match: Finn Allen (San Francisco Unicorns)

- San Francisco Unicorns won the toss and elected to field.
- Sanjay Krishnamurthi (San Francisco Unicorns) made his T20 debut.

Match 5
July 8, 2024
3:30 PM (D/N)
Scorecard

Texas Super Kings; 203/5 (20 overs)	v	Washington Freedom; 62/0 (4 overs)
Faf du Plessis 100 (58); Saurabh Netravalkar 2/33 (4 overs)		Travis Head 32* (12)

No result
Church Street Park, Morrisville
Umpires: Marais Erasmus (SA) and Vijaya Mallela (USA)

- Washington Freedom won the toss and elected to field.
- Rain prevented any further play.

Match 6
July 9, 2024
7:30 PM (N)
Scorecard

Los Angeles Knight Riders; 168/5 (20 overs)	v	Seattle Orcas; 169/1 (19.5 overs)
Jason Roy 69 (52); Zaman Khan 2/24 (4 overs)		Ryan Rickelton 103* (66); Spencer Johnson 1/28 (4 overs)

Seattle Orcas won by 9 wickets
Grand Prairie Stadium, Dallas
Umpires: Gregory Brathwaite (WI) and Jermaine Lindo (USA)
Player of the match: Ryan Rickelton (Seattle Orcas)

- Seattle Orcas won the toss and elected to field.
- Ryan Rickelton (Seattle Orcas) scored his first century in T20s.

Match 7
July 10, 2024
3:00 PM
Scorecard

San Francisco Unicorns; 127 (17.5 overs)	v	Texas Super Kings; 128/3 (12.5 overs)
Matthew Short 33 (15); Mohammad Mohsin 4/13 (3.5 overs)		Faf du Plessis 34 (17); Hassan Khan 2/16 (2 overs)

Texas Super Kings won by 7 wickets
Church Street Park, Morrisville
Umpires: Marais Erasmus (SA) and Vijaya Mallela (USA)
Player of the match: Mohammad Mohsin (Texas Super Kings)

- Texas Super Kings won the toss and elected to field.

Match 8
July 11, 2024
7:30 PM (N)
Scorecard

Seattle Orcas; 124 (19.4 overs)	v	Washington Freedom; 127/5 (18.2 overs)
Heinrich Klaasen 51 (30); Lockie Ferguson 4/26 (4 overs)		Lahiru Milantha 33* (30); Nandre Burger 2/27 (4 overs)

Washington Freedom won by 5 wickets
Grand Prairie Stadium, Dallas
Umpires: Gregory Brathwaite (WI) and Billy Taylor (USA)
Player of the match: Lockie Ferguson (Washington Freedom)

- Washington Freedom won the toss and elected to field.

Match 9
July 12, 2024
3:00 PM
Scorecard

MI New York	v	Texas Super Kings

Match abandoned
Church Street Park, Morrisville
Umpires: Marais Erasmus (SA) and Rushane Samuels (WI)

- Texas Super Kings won the toss and elected to field.
- No play was possible due to rain.

Match 10
July 13, 2024
3:00 PM
Scorecard

Los Angeles Knight Riders	v	San Francisco Unicorns

Match abandoned
Church Street Park, Morrisville
Umpires: Owen Brown (USA) and Marais Erasmus (SA)

- San Francisco Unicorns won the toss and elected to field.
- No play was possible due to rain.

Match 11
July 14, 2024
3:30 PM (D/N)
Scorecard

Los Angeles Knight Riders; 129 (18.4 overs)	v	Washington Freedom; 130/2 (16 overs)
Saif Badar 35 (28); Saurabh Netravalkar 4/35 (3.4 overs)		Travis Head 54 (32); Shadley van Schalkwyk 1/17 (2 overs)

Washington Freedom won by 8 wickets
Church Street Park, Morrisville
Umpires: Gregory Brathwaite (WI) and Jermaine Lindo (USA)
Player of the match: Glenn Maxwell (Washington Freedom)

- Washington Freedom won the toss and elected to field.

Match 12
July 14, 2024
7:30 PM (N)
Scorecard

(H) Texas Super Kings; 176/6 (20 overs)	v	MI New York; 161/7 (20 overs)
Faf du Plessis 61 (38); Trent Boult 2/48 (4 overs)		Monank Patel 61 (45); Marcus Stoinis 4/50 (4 overs)

Texas Super Kings won by 15 runs
Grand Prairie Stadium, Dallas
Umpires: Marais Erasmus (SA) and Vijaya Mallela (USA)
Player of the match: Rashid Khan (MI New York)

- MI New York won the toss and elected to field.

Match 13
July 15, 2024
3:30 PM (D/N)
Scorecard

San Francisco Unicorns; 165/7 (20 overs)	v	Seattle Orcas; 142/6 (20 overs)
Matthew Short 56 (32); Cameron Gannon 3/26 (4 overs)		Shehan Jayasuriya 54 (37); Liam Plunkett 3/26 (4 overs)

San Francisco Unicorns won by 23 runs
Church Street Park, Morrisville
Umpires: Gregory Brathwaite (WI) and Aditya Gajjar (USA)
Player of the match: Liam Plunkett (San Francisco Unicorns)

- Seattle Orcas won the toss and elected to field.

Match 14
July 16, 2024
7:30 PM (N)
Scorecard

Washington Freedom; 182/5 (20 overs)	v	MI New York; 88 (13.3 overs)
Andries Gous 59 (48); Kieron Pollard 2/14 (2 overs)		Romario Shepherd 25 (14); Jessy Singh 3/14 (3 overs)

Washington Freedom won by 94 runs
Grand Prairie Stadium, Dallas
Umpires: Marais Erasmus (SA) and Rushane Samuels (WI)
Player of the match: Jessy Singh (Washington Freedom)

- MI New York won the toss and elected to field.

Match 15
July 17, 2024
3:00 PM
Scorecard

Seattle Orcas; 142/6 (20 overs)	v	Los Angeles Knight Riders; 143/6 (19.1 overs)
Ryan Rickelton 89 (52); Corné Dry 1/8 (2 overs)		Unmukt Chand 62 (47); Harmeet Singh 2/27 (4 overs)

Los Angeles Knight Riders won by 4 wickets
Church Street Park, Morrisville
Umpires: Gregory Brathwaite (WI) and Billy Taylor (USA)
Player of the match: Ryan Rickelton (Seattle Orcas)

- Seattle Orcas won the toss and elected to bat.
- Ali Sheikh (Seattle Orcas) made his T20 debut.

Match 16
July 18, 2024
7:30 PM (N)
Scorecard

San Francisco Unicorns; 148/7 (20 overs)	v	MI New York; 145/7 (20 overs)
Corey Anderson 59* (37); Nosthush Kenjige 2/13 (4 overs)		Dewald Brevis 56 (36); Matthew Short 3/27 (4 overs)

San Francisco Unicorns won by 3 runs
Grand Prairie Stadium, Dallas
Umpires: Marais Erasmus (SA) and Rushane Samuels (WI)
Player of the match: Corey Anderson (San Francisco Unicorns)

- San Francisco Unicorns won the toss and elected to bat.

Match 17
July 19, 2024
7:30 PM (N)
Scorecard

Washington Freedom; 206/5 (20 overs)	v	Texas Super Kings (H); 164 (19.5 overs)
Steve Smith 57 (40); Noor Ahmad 3/38 (4 overs)		Faf du Plessis 55 (32); Rachin Ravindra 4/16 (3.5 overs)

Washington Freedom won by 42 runs
Grand Prairie Stadium, Dallas
Umpires: Jermaine Lindo (USA) and Billy Taylor (USA)
Player of the match: Jessy Singh (Washington Freedom)

- Texas Super Kings won the toss and elected to field.
- Noor Ahmad (Texas Super Kings) took his 100th wicket in T20s.

Match 18
July 20, 2024
7:30 PM PM (N)
Scorecard

Seattle Orcas; 152/7 (20 overs)	v	San Francisco Unicorns; 156/4 (14.2 overs)
Quinton de Kock 62 (33); Hassan Khan 3/5 (2 overs)		Finn Allen 77 (30); Harmeet Singh 2/39 (3.2 overs)

San Francisco Unicorns 6 wickets
Grand Prairie Stadium, Dallas
Umpires: Marais Erasmus (SA) and Vijaya Mallela (USA)
Player of the match: Finn Allen (San Francisco Unicorns)

- San Francisco Unicorns won the toss and elected to field.
- Quinton de Kock (Seattle Orcas) scored his 10,000th run in T20s.

Match 19
July 21, 2024
7:30 PM (N)
Scorecard

Los Angeles Knight Riders; 130 (19.1 overs)	v	MI New York; 134/6 (17 overs)
Andre Russell 35 (21); Rashid Khan 3/22 (4 overs)		Nicholas Pooran 35 (28); Sunil Narine 2/24 (4 overs)

MI New York won by 4 wickets
Grand Prairie Stadium, Dallas
Umpires: Gregory Brathwaite (WI) and Jermaine Lindo (USA)
Player of the match: Rashid Khan (MI New York)

- MI New York won the toss and elected to field.
- Rushil Ugarkar (MI New York) made his T20 debut.

Match 20
July 22, 2024
7:30 PM (N)
Scorecard

Washington Freedom; 174/3 (15.3 overs)	v	San Francisco Unicorns; 177/4 (13.4 overs)
Steve Smith 56 (31); Corey Anderson 2/20 (2 overs)		Sanjay Krishnamurthi 79* (42); Andrew Tye 3/41 (3 overs)

San Francisco Unicorns won by 6 wickets (DLS method)
Grand Prairie Stadium, Dallas
Umpires: Marais Erasmus (SA) and Billy Taylor (USA)
Player of the match: Sanjay Krishnamurthi (San Francisco Unicorns)

- San Francisco Unicorns won the toss and elected to field.
- Washington Freedom innings was reduced to 15.3 overs due to rain.
- San Francisco Unicorns were set a revised target of 177 runs from 14 overs due to rain.
- Juanoy Drysdale (San Francisco Unicorns) made his T20 debut.

Match 21
July 23, 2024
7:30 PM (N)
Scorecard

(H) Texas Super Kings; 177/8 (20 overs)	v	Seattle Orcas; 140/9 (20 overs)
Calvin Savage 45* (27); Keemo Paul 2/18 (3 overs)		Quinton de Kock 26 (19); Ottniel Baartman 3/20 (4 overs)

Texas Super Kings won by 37 runs
Grand Prairie Stadium, Dallas
Umpires: Gregory Brathwaite (WI) and Jermaine Lindo (USA)
Player of the match: Calvin Savage (Texas Super Kings)

- Seattle Orcas won the toss and elected to field.
- Ayan Desai (Seattle Orcas) and Zia Shahzad (Texas Super Kings) both made their T20 debut.

== Play-offs ==
Qualifier
July 25, 2024 – Dallas
1	Washington Freedom	149/3 (15.3 overs)
2	San Francisco Unicorns	145 (19 overs)
Eliminator
July 24, 2024 – Dallas
3	Texas Super Kings	167/1 (18.3 overs)
4	MI New York	163/8 (20 overs)

Challenger
July 26, 2024 – Dallas
QL	San Francisco Unicorns	200/6 (20 overs)
EW	Texas Super Kings	190/4 (20 overs)

Final
July 28, 2024 – Dallas
QW	Washington Freedom	207/5 (20 overs)
CW	San Francisco Unicorns	111 (16 overs)

=== Eliminator ===
July 24, 2024
7:30 PM (N)
Scorecard

MI New York; 163/8 (20 overs)	v	Texas Super Kings (H); 167/1 (18.3 overs)
Rashid Khan 55 (30); Marcus Stoinis 2/18 (4 overs)		Faf du Plessis 72 (47); Nosthush Kenjige 1/24 (3 overs)

Texas Super Kings won by 9 wickets
Grand Prairie Stadium, Dallas
Umpires: Marais Erasmus (SA) and Rushane Samuels (WI)
Player of the match: Faf du Plessis (Texas Super Kings)

- Texas Super Kings won the toss and elected to field.

=== Qualifier ===
July 25, 2024
7:30 PM (N)
Scorecard

San Francisco Unicorns; 145 (19 overs)	v	Washington Freedom; 149/3 (15.3 overs)
Hassan Khan 57 (36); Rachin Ravindra 4/11 (2.4 overs)		Travis Head 77* (44); Hassan Khan 2/32 (4 overs)

Washington Freedom won by 7 wickets
Grand Prairie Stadium, Dallas
Umpires: Gregory Brathwaite (WI) and Vijaya Mallela (USA)
Player of the match: Travis Head (Washington Freedom)

- Washington Freedom won the toss and elected to field.

=== Challenger ===
July 26, 2024
7:30 PM (N)
Scorecard

San Francisco Unicorns; 200/6 (20 overs)	v	Texas Super Kings (H); 190/4 (20 overs)
Finn Allen 101 (53); Noor Ahmad 3/27 (4 overs)		Devon Conway 62* (38); Juanoy Drysdale 2/33 4 overs)

San Francisco Unicorns won by 10 runs
Grand Prairie Stadium, Dallas
Umpires: Marais Erasmus (SA) and Billy Taylor (USA)
Player of the match: Finn Allen (San Francisco Unicorns)

- Texas Super Kings won the toss and elected to field.

=== Final ===
July 28, 2024
7:30 PM (N)
Scorecard

Washington Freedom; 207/5 (20 overs)	v	San Francisco Unicorns; 111 (16 overs)
Steve Smith 88 (52); Pat Cummins 2/35 (4 overs)		Carmi le Roux 20* (19); Rachin Ravindra 3/23 (4 overs)

Washington Freedom won by 96 runs
Grand Prairie Stadium, Dallas
Umpires: Gregory Brathwaite (WI) and Marais Erasmus (SA)
Player of the match: Steve Smith (Washington Freedom)

- San Francisco Unicorns won the toss and elected to field.

== Statistics ==
=== Most runs ===
Runs	Player	Team	Inns	HS	SR	Ave
420	Faf du Plessis	Texas Super Kings	8	100	171.42	52.50
336	Steve Smith	Washington Freedom	9	88	148.67	56.00
336	Travis Head	Washington Freedom	9	77*	173.19	48.00
306	Finn Allen	San Francisco Unicorns	9	101	187.73	34.00
293	Devon Conway	Texas Super Kings	8	62*	143.62	58.60
Source: ESPNCricinfo

=== Most wickets ===
Wkts	Player	Team	Inns	Ovs	BBI	Eco
15	Saurabh Netravalkar	Washington Freedom	7	26.2	4/35	7.67
12	Rachin Ravindra	Washington Freedom	6	15.1	4/11	4.81
11	Cameron Gannon	Seattle Orcas	7	23.0	3/26	9.21
11	Marco Jansen	Washington Freedom	8	31.0	3/28	8.61
10	Hassan Khan	San Francisco Unicorns	7	22.0	3/5	7.09
10	Rashid Khan	MI New York	7	26	3/22	6.15
10	Glenn Maxwell	Washington Freedom	8	25.3	3/15	6.66
10	Lockie Ferguson	Washington Freedom	7	25.2	4/26	7.26
Source: ESPNCricinfo

== Awards ==
On July 29, 2024, a list of end of season awards was announced.

Awards in the 2024 Major League Cricket
Name	Team	Award
Travis Head	Washington Freedom	Most Valuable Player
Faf du Plessis	Texas Super Kings	Leading run scorer
Saurabh Netravalkar	Washington Freedom	Leading wicket taker
Hassan Khan	San Francisco Unicorns	Domestic Player of the Series

== See also ==
- 2024 Minor League Cricket season
