= 2024 Minor League Cricket season =

Twenty20 cricket tournament in America

- Dates: August 30, 2024 – October 6, 2024
- Administrator(s): USA Cricket; Major League Cricket
- Cricket format: Twenty20
- Tournament format(s): Round-robin and knockout
- Champions: Chicago Kingsmen (1st title)
- Runners-up: East Bay Blazers
- Participants: 25
- Matches: 113
- Player of the series: Saad Ali
- Most runs: Sujith Gowda (446)
- Most wickets: Sankirth Batthula (20)
- Official website: minorleaguecricket.com

The 2024 Minor League Cricket season (branded as the 2024 Minor League Cricket championship presented by YASH Technologies for sponsorship reasons and sometimes shortened to 2024 MiLC) was the fourth season of Minor League Cricket, established by USA Cricket (USAC) and Major League Cricket (MLC) in 2019. The league tapped YASH Technologies as title sponsor, replacing previous sponsor Sunoco, with IRA Sportswear tapped as the league's official apparel partner. The season was hosted over 19 venues across the United States from August 30 to October 6, 2024.

The tournament was won by the Chicago Kingsmen, who defeated the Bay Blazers in the finals by 4 wickets, with Saad Ali of the Kingsmen winning the award for the Most Valuable Player (MVP) of the tournament. The now-defunct Dallas Mustangs were the defending champions.

== Teams and venues ==
A complete list of ground venues, along with the 2024 season's schedule, was released on July 31. Ahead of the 2024 season, the Empire State Titans underwent a name change to the New York City Titans, while the Dallas Mustangs were discontinued.

=== Pacific Conference ===
Western Division

- Silicon Valley Strikers (Bay Peninsula) – Morgan Hills Sports Complex
- Bay Blazers (East Bay) – Santa Clara Cricket Stadium
- SoCal Lashings (Los Angeles) – Leo Magnus Cricket Complex
- Golden State Grizzlies (Sacramento, California) – Arroyo Park
- San Diego Surf Riders (San Diego) – Canyonside Park
- Seattle Thunderbolts (Seattle) – Tollgate Farm Park

Central Division

- Lone Star Athletics (Austin, Texas) – Moosa Stadium
- Chicago
  - Chicago Kingsmen – Kingsmen Stadium
  - Chicago Tigers – Tigers Park
- Dallas Xforia Giants – Grand Prairie Stadium
- Houston Hurricanes (Houston) – Prairie View Cricket Complex
- Michigan Cricket Stars (Michigan) – ACAC Park
- St. Louis Americans (St. Louis)

=== Atlantic Conference ===
Eastern Division

- Mercer County Park
  - Manhattan Yorkers (New York)
  - New England Eagles (Boston)
  - NJ Somerset Cavaliers (Somerset, New Jersey)
  - New Jersey Stallions (Jersey City, New Jersey)
- New York City Titans (New York City) – Glenville Cricket Complex
- The Philadelphians (Philadelphia) – Hatfield Park

Southern Division

- Atlanta
  - Atlanta Fire – Param Veers Cricket Field
  - Atlanta Lightning – Atlanta Cricket Field
- Morrisville Raptors (Morrisville, North Carolina) – Church Street Park
- Orlando Galaxy (Orlando)
- Ft. Lauderdale Lions (Fort Lauderdale, Florida) – Broward County Stadium
- Baltimore Royals (Baltimore)
– Western Division (Pacific Conference)
- – Central Division (Pacific Conference)
- – Eastern Division (Atlantic Conference)
- – Southern Division (Atlantic Conference)

== Squads ==
A team could select a minimum of 14 players in their squad, going up to a maximum of 18 players. The teams released their squads shortly before the start of the season.

Atlanta Fire

- Corné Dry
- Aksh Dave
- Ateendra Subramanian
- Ansh Patel
- Benjamin Calitz
- Steven Taylor
- Hanchard Hamilton
- Amila Aponso
- Jay Pathak
- Viraj Vaghela
- Jagroop Raina
- Ridwan Palash
- Venukalyan Madireddy
- Paul Palmer
- Ateendra Subramanian
- Rishi Pandey
- Vansh Patel
- Zia Shahzad

Atlanta Lightning

- Akhil Posa
- Amrut Pore
- Aran Chenchu
- Chaithanya Chava
- Dawood Azeem
- Javelle Glen
- Jesse Bootan
- Junaid Siddiqui
- Mark Parchment
- Neive McNally
- Nitish Sudini
- Phani Simhadri
- Prasad Murthy
- Sagar Patel
- Soaeb Tai
- Subash Sankar
- Sunny Patel
- Unmukt Chand
- Vasu Vegi

Baltimore Royals

- Aaryan Batra
- Abdulahad Malek
- Amandeep Singh
- Derone Davis
- Obus Pienaar
- Jaskaran Buttar
- Kunwarjeet Singh
- Mohammad Mohsin
- Muhammad Alam
- Neil Narvekar
- Raunaq Sharma
- Ravi Inder Singh
- Rishi Ramesh
- Sarabjit Ladda
- Sharad Lumba
- Shubham Gaur
- Shuja Khan
- Yevin Goonatilake
- Yuvraj Samra

Ft. Lauderdale Lions

- Achilles Browne
- Adam Khan
- Bryan Gayle
- Clinton Pestano
- Danza Hyatt
- Dino Chooweenam
- Elton Tucker Jr.
- Gauranshu Sharma
- Isaiah Rajah
- Kevin Stoute
- Mario Rampersaud
- Mohib Siddiqui
- Rajesh Ragoo
- Ravendra Persaud
- Ryan Persaud
- Tagenarine Chanderpaul
- Vinit Tagarse
- Zachary Sattaur

Morrisville Raptors

- Aaron Jones
- Abhiram Bolisetty
- Aditya Gupta
- Aditya Padala
- Ansh Rai
- Atul Iyer
- Christopher Barnwell
- George Baldwin
- John Campbell
- Karthikeya Jagadish
- Keon Joseph
- Liam Doherty
- Raj Nannan
- Ritvik Appidi
- Rohan Phadke
- Ryan Wiggins
- Saharsh Shwethan
- Sanjay Stanley
- Trevon Griffith

Orlando Galaxy

- Adavit Varadarajan
- Akeem Dodson
- Anirudh Bolisetty
- Antonico Scott
- Bhaskar Ghanasakthi
- Bhavin Patel
- Dimitri Adams
- Dunae Nathaniel
- Hardik Desai
- Manav Patel
- Meetul Patel
- Naseer Khan
- Parth Patel
- Romario King
- Shuaib Syed
- Siddhant Shah
- Sumit Sehrawat
- Vijay Balagopala

New England Eagles

- Amit Patil
- Apurva Maheshram
- Burhan Saeed
- Derick Narine
- Earl Henningham
- Irfan Nasim
- Joshua Dhanai
- Karan Parikh
- Sohrawordi Shuvo
- Noman Iftikhar
- Pranav Rao
- Rishikesh Bodugum
- Rizwan Mazhar
- Samarth Tiwari
- Talha Mumtaz
- Usman Ashraf
- Vandit Prajapati
- Vasudeva Reddy Mallepally

NJ Somerset Cavaliers

- Abdullah Ghazi
- Adil Bhatti
- Ahmed Labib
- Ali Imran
- Ayush Patel
- Chandrapaul Hemraj
- Gajanand Singh
- Junaid Nadir
- Kennar Lewis
- Muhammad Saeed
- Rishi Shimpi
- Salman Nazar
- Steven Katwaroo
- Abdullah Syed
- Najaf Syed
- Zohaib Syed
- Vraj Tarak Desai
- Waleed Karimullah

Manhattan Yorkers

- Abhayjit Khangura
- Arya Garg
- Danesh Patel
- Deep Joshi
- Deep Patel
- Dhruv Pawar
- Ishan Sharma
- Jaykishan Parwani
- Manoj Acharya
- Nil Patel
- Nimish Bachu
- Nirmith Shashidhar
- Pranav Chettipalayam
- Preet Shah
- Raj Bhavsar
- Ruchir Joshi
- Shapnil Roy
- Siddarth Kappa
- Yasir Mohammad

New Jersey Stallions

- Aman Patel
- Anirudh Immanuel
- Arjun Vajjalla
- Devansh Sheth
- Dominique Rikhi
- Hiren Patel
- Jessy Singh
- Jaydev Patel
- Karan Patel
- Farhad Reza
- Raymond Ramrattan
- Rohan Mustafa
- Rushik Patel
- Sachin Mylavarapu
- Saiteja Mukkamalla
- Siddarth Matani
- Steohen Wiig
- Supreet Madaan
- Vaibhav Suresh

The Philadelphians

- Abdul Jabbar
- Arsh Arora
- Ashish Vattem
- Bhaskar Yadram
- Christopher van Tull
- Deveshwari Prashad
- Javein Thomas
- Jonathan Foo
- Juanoy Drysdale
- Liam Plunkett
- Nitish Mahesh
- Ryan Scott
- Sivaram Chowdary
- Soripul Islam
- Taahaa Warraich
- Varun Mantha
- Yashwant Balaji

New York City Titans

- Aashish Katipally
- Abdur Rehman
- Alex Algoo
- Aryan Singh
- Emanuel Seecharran
- Gaurav Jayaswal
- Keshav Raval
- Kwane Ratton Jr.
- Mario Lovvan
- Omkar Zope
- Raj Mohabe
- Ravish Khanchi
- Ryan Shun
- Satvik Addala
- Shashank Krishnamurthi
- Siddhant Pillai
- Viral Parekh
- Wasiq Ali Faiz

Lone Star Athletics

- Aarin Nadkarni
- Aarnav Patel
- Arun Nag
- Arya Kannantha
- Aryan Satheesh
- Awais Zia
- Imran Khan Jr.
- Kamran Sheikh
- Karan Patel
- Krish Patel
- Laksh Parikh
- Muhammad Usman
- Naqqash Basharat
- Shatrughan Rambhran
- Shreyan Satheesh
- Sidhesh Pathare

Chicago Kingsmen

- Abhimanyu Poswal
- Ammad Alam
- Anshul Bisht
- Anwar Ali Khan
- Asif Mehmood
- Ehsan Adil
- Faraz Ali
- Hammad Azam
- Haseeb Azam
- Hassan Khan
- Hassan Mohsin
- Kevin Philip
- Najam Iqbal
- Rameez Raja
- Shaheer Hassan
- Saad Ali
- Tajinder Singh
- Zia-ul-Haq

Chicago Tigers

- Ali Nadeem
- Aryan Patel
- Azeem Ghumman
- Calvin Savage
- Deepchand Pinnaka
- Jay Desai
- Justin Dill
- Mittansh Nithiyanandam
- Mohit Patel
- Pruthvish Patel
- Rahul Basu
- Raj Vyas
- Sai Daggupati
- Shiv Shani
- Soumen Das
- Tirth Patel
- Vineet Sinha
- Yash Patel

Houston Hurricanes

- Akhilesh Bodugum
- Ali Sheikh
- Ansh Bhoje
- Arir Ali
- Hamza Khalid
- Hassan Rashid
- Joshua Tromp
- Karan Narang
- Karthik Gattepalli
- Lahiru Milantha
- Matthew Tromp
- Mukhtar Ahmed
- Rayaan Bhagani
- Saif Badar
- Sanchit Sandhu
- Sharv Saraykar
- Usman Rafiq
- Usman Shinwari

Dallas Xforia Giants

- Aakarshit Gomel
- Abhinav Choudhary
- Andries Gous
- Arjun Mahesh
- Chaitanya Bishnoi
- Corey Anderson
- Gaurav Bajaj
- Gaurav Patwal
- Harish Kakani
- Harmeet Singh
- Nausah Shaikh
- Prathamesh Pawal
- Rehman Dar
- Sankirth Batthula
- Saurabh Patwal
- Shaik Noorbasha
- Shubham Ranjane
- Siddantham Praneeth

Michigan Cricket Stars

- Abhimanya Mithun
- Abhinav Sikharam
- Ahmed Butt
- Akhilesh Balan
- Danush Kaveripakam
- Kuzefa Ahmed
- Kiran Kumar Reddy
- Muned Ahmed
- Naren Dharma
- Nikhil Kanchan
- Ritwik Behera
- Saad Humayun
- Sushant Modani
- Tanaf Wasie
- Umar Farooq
- Waqas Saleem
- Yash Verma

St. Louis Americans

- Abhimanyu Lamba
- Adnit Jhamb
- Angad Singh
- Arnav Jhamb
- Deepak Alagesan
- Hamid Safi
- Joshua Kind
- Karan Anand
- Maaez Veqar
- Muhammad Ilyas
- Munir Kakar
- Naseer Jamali
- Nauman Anwar
- Nisarulhaq Wahdat
- Rayaan Taj
- Ujjwal Vinnakota
- Venkatesh Naidu
- Zahid Zakhail

Bay Blazers

- Aarnav Iyer
- Abhishek Paradkar
- Adithya Ganesh
- Carmi le Roux
- Hamza Tariq
- Harikrishnan Nair
- Kristopher Ramsaran
- Nawaz Khan
- Pankaj Kumar
- Rushil Ugarkar
- Sabrish Prasad
- Saideep Ganesh
- Sanjay Krishnamurthi
- Sujith Gowda
- Suliman Arabzai
- Supransh Kumar
- Surya Kiran
- Usman Ghani
- Vikash Mohan

Silicon Valley Strikers

- Adit Gorawara
- Amirhamza Hotak
- Anthony Bramble
- Anthony Wadsworth
- Faisal Ahmadzai
- Gary Graham
- Ishwarjot Sohi
- Khush Bhalala
- Naman Patil
- Narsingh Deonarine
- Nithin Kanduri
- Pranay Suri
- Sai Anurag
- Saurabh Netravalkar
- Shehan Jayasuriya
- Shivam Mishra
- Siddhant Senthil
- Tejas Nataraj

Golden State Grizzlies

- Adnesh Tondale
- Ajay Immadi
- Ali Raza
- Amogh Arepally
- Mayank Arora
- Mohit Nataraj
- Parnavh Pradeep
- Rahul Jariwala
- Sahil Garg
- Sohan Bhat
- Suhwant Sekhon
- Surya Narayan
- Tarun Adada
- Vatsal Vaghela
- Vraj Patel

Los Angeles Lashings

- Abhimanyu Rajp
- Akmal Hajizada
- Aksha Shah
- Arjav Patel
- Arqam Qureshi
- Ayan Desai
- Cody Chetty
- Daksh Prabhu
- Devaansh Mehra
- Elmore Hutchinson
- Gantavviya Motwani
- Harkaran Gujral
- Harpreet Singh
- Kirstan Kallicharan
- Neeraj Goel
- Rubal Raina
- Suraj Kumar
- Vedant Jain

San Diego Surf Riders

- Aayush Khandelwal
- Abheyender Singh
- Abhinay Vanipally
- Ajay Sharma
- Chad Breetzke
- Devam Shrivastava
- Muditha Fernando
- Jaideep Reddy
- Javed Zadran
- Kunj Bhagat
- Muhammad Faisal
- Nikhil Dutta
- Pratik Desai
- Ruvindu Gunasekera
- Sahaj Patel
- Saurabh Nalavade
- Skanda Rohit Sharma
- Umar Akmal

San Diego Surf Riders

- Abhijai Mansingh
- Abinav Sudershanum
- Atif Attarwala
- Banty Dhounchak
- Cinci Siegertsz
- Honest Ziwira
- Ian Chauhan
- Kairav Sharma
- Krirsh Katre
- Rahul Nama
- Rishab Mohan
- Ruben Clinton
- Sanat Misra
- Shadley van Schalkwyk
- Shaswat Kohli
- Shivam Sharma
- Shreyas Chitneni
- Sujit Nayak

== Results ==
=== Atlantic Conference ===
Home \ Away	NEE	NJSC	NJS	EST	MY	TP	BR	AF	AL	FLL	MR	OG
Eagles	—						–	–	–	–	–	–
Cavaliers		—					–			–	–	–
Stallions			—				–	–	–	–	–	–
Titans				—			–	–	–	–	–	–
Yorkers					—		–	–	–	–	–	–
Philadelphians						—	–			–	–	–
Royals	–	–	–	–	–	–	—					
Fire	–		–	–	–			—				
Lightning	–		–	–	–				—			
Lions	–	–	–	–	–	–				—		
Raptors	–	–	–	–	–	–					—	
Galaxy	–	–	–	–	–	–					1–1	—

Updated to match(es) played on August 30, 2024. Source: Minor League Cricket
Legend: Blue = home team win; Yellow = draw; Red = away team win.
For upcoming matches, an "a" indicates there is an article about the rivalry between the two participants.

=== Pacific Conference ===
Home \ Away	SVS	EBB	SCL	GSG	SDR	ST	LSA	CK	CT	DM	DXG	HH	MCS	SLA
Strikers	—	–	–	–	–	–	–	–	–	–	–	–	–	–
Blazers	–	—	–	–	–	–	–	–	–	–	–	–	–	–
Lashings	–	–	—	–	–	–	–	–	–	–	–	–	–	–
Grizzlies	–	–	–	—	–	–	–	–	–	–	–	–	–	–
Riders	–	–	–	–	—	–	–	–	–	–	–	–	–	–
Thunderbolts	–	–	–	–	–	—	–	–	–	–	–	–	–	–
Athletics	–	–	–	–	–	–	—	–	–	–	–	–	–	–
Kingsmen	–	–	–	–	–	–	–	—	–	–	–	–	–	–
Tigers	–	–	–	–	–	–	–	–	—	–	–	–	–	–
Mustangs	–	–	–	–	–	–	–	–	–	—	–	–	–	–
Giants	–	–	–	–	–	–	–	–	–	–	—	–	–	–
Hurricanes	–	–	–	–	–	–	–	–	–	–	–	—	–	–
Stars	–	–	–	–	–	–	–	–	–	–	–	–	—	–
Americans	–	–	–	–	–	–	–	–	–	–	–	–		—

Updated to match(es) played on August 30, 2024. Source: Minor League Cricket
Legend: Blue = home team win; Yellow = draw; Red = away team win.
For upcoming matches, an "a" indicates there is an article about the rivalry between the two participants.

== League stage ==
=== Atlantic Conference ===
==== Southern Division ====
Pos	Team	Pld	W	L	NR	Pts	NRR
1	Baltimore Royals	8	4	1	3	11	0.908
2	Morrisville Raptors	8	4	1	3	11	0.725
3	Atlanta Fire	8	5	3	0	10	1.248
4	Atlanta Lightning	8	4	4	0	8	−0.233
5	Ft. Lauderdale Lions	8	1	5	2	4	−0.922
6	Orlando Galaxy	8	0	4	4	4	−2.692

Updated to match(es) played on January 30, 2025. Source: Minor League Cricket
- Top three teams move on
- advances to Super 8s
- advances to Knockout stage
Division matches

August 30, 2024
3:00 PM (EST)
Scorecard

Atlanta Lightning; 113 (19.2 overs)	v	Morrisville Raptors; 114/8 (19.4 overs)
Sunny Patel 25 (16); Christopher Barnwell 4/18 (3.2 overs)		Ryan Wiggins 24 (17); Soaeb Tai 3/22 (4 overs)

Morrisville Raptors won by 2 wickets (2 balls left)
Param Veers Cricket Field, Atlanta
Umpires: Aditya Gajjar and Nur Uddin
Player of the match: Christopher Barnwell (MR)

- Morrisville Raptors won the toss and elected to bowl

August 31, 2024
10:15 AM (EST)
Scorecard

Morrisville Raptors; 52/6 (8 overs)	v	Atlanta Fire; 58/5 (7.4 overs)
Ryan Wiggins 19 (9); Ansh Patel 2/15 (2 overs)		Rajdeep Darbar 21 (18); Raj Nannan 2/8 (2 overs)

Atlanta Fire won by 5 wickets (2 balls left, D/L)
Param Veers Cricket Field, Atlanta
Umpires: Conrad Rogers and Ravikumar Balasubramaniam
Player of the match: Hanchard Hamilton (AF)

- Atlanta Fire won the toss and elected to bowl
- Match was reduced to 8 overs per side

August 31, 2024
2:15 PM (EST)
Scorecard

Baltimore Royals; 103/6 (20 overs)	v	Atlanta Lightning; 104/7 (19.3 overs)
Ravi Inder Singh 49 (51); Phani Simhadri 2/22 (4 overs)		Sagar Patel 28 (52); Sarabjit Ladda 2/16 (4 overs)

Atlanta Lightning won by 3 wickets (3 balls left)
Param Veers Cricket Field, Atlanta
Umpires: Aditya Gajjar and Sandip Gondhalekar
Player of the match: Mark Parchment (AL)

- Baltimore Royals won the toss and elected to bat

September 1, 2024
10:15 AM (EST)
Scorecard

Morrisville Raptors; 118/6 (12 overs)	v	Atlanta Lightning; 80/8 (12 overs)
Trevon Griffith 50 (24); Phani Simhadri 3/22 (3 overs)		Sunny Patel 16 (11); Christopher Barnwell 3/15 (2 overs)

Morrisville Raptors won by 38 runs
Param Veers Cricket Field, Atlanta
Umpires: Vijay Shah and Nur Uddin
Player of the match: Trevon Griffith (MR)

- Atlanta Lightning won the toss and elected to bowl
- Match was reduced to 12 overs per side

September 1, 2024
2:15 PM (EST)
Scorecard

Atlanta Fire; 139 (20 overs)	v	Baltimore Royals; 142/5 (18.2 overs)
Aksh Dave 41 (30); Muhammad Alam 3/21 (4 overs)		Abdulahad Malik 41 (36); Ansh Patel 2/17 (4 overs)

Baltimore Royals won by 5 wickets (10 balls left)
Param Veers Cricket Field, Atlanta
Umpires: Aditya Gajjar and Sandip Gondhalekar
Player of the match: Muhammad Alam (BR)

- Atlanta Fire won the toss and elected to bat

==== Eastern Division ====
Pos	Team	Pld	W	L	NR	Pts	NRR
1	NJ Somerset Cavaliers	8	6	2	0	12	1.919
2	New Jersey Stallions	8	6	2	0	12	1.062
3	The Philadelphians	8	5	3	0	10	0.684
4	Manhattan Yorkers	8	3	5	0	6	−0.622
5	New England Eagles	8	2	6	0	4	−1.458
6	New York City Titans	8	2	6	0	4	−1.551

Updated to match(es) played on January 30, 2025. Source: Minor League Cricket
- Top three teams move on
- advances to Super 8s
- advances to Knockout stage
Division matches

=== Pacific Conference ===
==== Central Division ====
Pos	Team	Pld	W	L	NR	Pts	NRR
1	Chicago Kingsmen	8	7	0	1	15	2.030
2	Dallas Xforia Giants	8	5	2	1	11	0.955
3	St. Louis Americans	8	5	2	1	11	0.589
4	Houston Hurricanes	8	4	3	1	9	0.209
5	Lone Star Athletics	8	2	4	2	6	−0.728
6	Chicago Tigers	8	1	6	1	3	−1.374
7	Michigan Cricket Stars	8	0	7	1	1	−1.742

Updated to match(es) played on January 30, 2025. Source: Minor League Cricket
- Top three teams move on
- advances to Super 8s
- advances to Knockout stage
Division matches

==== Western Division ====
Pos	Team	Pld	W	L	NR	Pts	NRR
1	East Bay Blazers	8	6	2	0	12	1.473
2	Seattle Thunderbolts	8	6	2	0	12	0.525
3	Silicon Valley Strikers	8	4	4	0	8	0.528
4	San Diego Surf Riders	8	4	4	0	8	0.165
5	Los Angeles Lashings	8	2	6	0	4	−0.738
6	Golden State Grizzlies	8	2	6	0	4	−2.001

Updated to match(es) played on January 30, 2025. Source: Minor League Cricket
- Top three teams move on
- advances to Super 8s
- advances to Knockout stage
Division matches

== Playoffs ==
=== Group 1 ===
Pos	Team	Pld	W	L	NR	Pts	NRR
1	East Bay Blazers	3	2	1	0	4	0.734
2	New Jersey Somerset Cavaliers	3	2	1	0	4	−0.003
3	Morrisville Raptors	3	1	2	0	2	−0.279
4	Dallas Xforia Giants	3	1	2	0	2	−0.462

Updated to match(es) played on January 30, 2025. Source: Minor League Cricket
- Atlantic champion moves on
- advances to Final

=== Group 2 ===
Pos	Team	Pld	W	L	NR	Pts	NRR
1	Chicago Kingsmen	3	3	0	0	6	2.183
2	Baltimore Royals	3	2	1	0	4	1.744
3	Seattle Thunderbolts	3	1	2	0	2	0.471
4	New Jersey Stallions	3	0	3	0	0	−4.481

Updated to match(es) played on January 30, 2025. Source: Minor League Cricket
- Atlantic champion moves on
- advances to Final

=== Final ===
6 October 2024
6:00 PM
Scorecard

East Bay Blazers; 172/5 (20 overs)	v	Chicago Kingsmen; 173/6 (18.1 overs)
Usman Ghani 35 (16); Anwar Ali Khan 2/26 (4)		Hammad Azam 53 (23); Carmi Le Roux 2/41 (3.1)

Chicago Kingsmen won by 4 Wickets
Grand Prairie Stadium, Texas
Umpires: Bryan Caine and Harshvardhan Uppaluru
Player of the match: Hammad Azam (Chicago Kingsmen)

- Chicago Kingsmen won the toss and elected to bowl

== Statistics ==
=== Most runs ===
Player	Team	Mat	Inns	Runs	Ave	SR	HS	100	50	4s	6s
Sujith Gowda	East Bay Blazers	12	12	446	37.17	131.18	94	0	4	45	20
Syed Saad Ali	Chicago Kingsmen	11	11	423	47	137.79	80	0	5	36	19
Tajinder Singh	Chicago Kingsmen	11	9	395	65.83	146.30	80	0	4	33	14
Ruben Clinton	Seattle Thunderbolts	9	9	380	47.50	121.02	92	0	3	37	13
Sujit Nayak	Seattle Thunderbolts	11	9	354	59	150.64	84	0	3	20	15
Source: Minor League Cricket

=== Most wickets ===
Player	Team	Mat	Inns	Wkts	BBI	Avg	Econ	SR	4w	5w
Sankirth Batthula	Dallas Xforia Giants	10	10	20	3/14	12.20	6.42	11.4	0	0
Rushil Ugarkar	East Bay Blazers	12	12	19	3/13	16	6.76	14.2	0	0
Vikash Mohan	East Bay Blazers	12	11	18	3/16	10.22	5.47	11.2	0	0
Mario Lobban	NYC Titans	8	8	18	4/10	10.39	5.94	10.5	1	0
Hammad Azam	Chicago Kingsmen	11	11	18	3/1	13.67	5.41	13.3	0	0
Source: Minor League Cricket

== See also ==
- 2024 Major League Cricket season
