= 2023 Major League Cricket season =

First season of Major League Cricket

2023 Major League Cricket
- Dates: 13 – 30 July 2023
- Administrator(s): American Cricket Enterprises; USA Cricket
- Cricket format: Twenty20
- Tournament format(s): Round-robin and playoffs
- Champions: MI New York (1st title)
- Runners-up: Seattle Orcas
- Participants: 6
- Matches: 19
- Attendance: 1,000 (53 per match)
- Player of the series: Nicholas Pooran (MI New York)
- Most runs: Nicholas Pooran (MI New York) (388)
- Most wickets: Trent Boult (MI New York) (22)
- Official website: Major League Cricket

The 2023 Major League Cricket (also known as MLC 2023) was the inaugural season of Major League Cricket, a franchise Twenty20 cricket league established in 2019 by American Cricket Enterprises (ACE) in the United States. The season was hosted at two venues, Grand Prairie Stadium in Grand Prairie, Texas and Church Street Park in Morrisville, North Carolina. The season was played from 13 to 30 July 2023, with MI New York defeating the Seattle Orcas by seven wickets to win the inaugural title.

The tournament surpassed expectations financially, generating a reported $8 million in revenue. The tournament also garnered positive and optimistic outlooks on the future of cricket in the United States.

== Background ==
Major League Cricket announced in November 2022 that its inaugural season would be played at Grand Prairie Stadium starting July 13 and concluding July 30. MLC also revealed that the tournament would be played in a single round-robin format with fifteen league matches played among six franchises before a four-match play-off phase.

In March 2023, the teams for the tournament were announced ahead of the league's inaugural draft—called the Texas Super Kings, the Seattle Orcas, the Los Angeles Knight Riders, the Washington Freedom, the MI New York and the San Francisco Unicorns, respectively. The draft for the season was then held on March 19, with Harmeet Singh being picked first overall and Aaron Finch and Ahona Ahmed Arthee among others highlighting the draft. In the buildup to the season opener, teams signed multiple other players including Jason Roy, Adam Zampa and Moises Henriques.

In April, USA Cricket—the governing body of cricket in the United States—officially sanctioned the tournament following a dispute with tournament organizers, American Cricket Enterprises, that threatened to delay the launch of MLC. Tournament fixtures were announced on June 12—nearly two months later. In addition, it also revealed that the tournament would be held at two venues, Grand Prairie Stadium and Church Street Park for the group stage, while all play-off matches and the final would be held at Grand Prairie Stadium. Tickets for the matches were also made available on the same day.

== Teams ==
Teams were announced by MLC in March 2023, with team coaches and captains being announced in the months following.

Teams in the 2023 Major League Cricket
Franchise	Head coach	Captain
Los Angeles Knight Riders	Phil Simmons	Sunil Narine
MI New York	Robin Peterson	Kieron Pollard
San Francisco Unicorns	Shane Watson	Aaron Finch
Seattle Orcas	Pravin Amre	Wayne Parnell
Texas Super Kings	Stephen Fleming	Faf du Plessis
Washington Freedom	Greg Shipperd	Moises Henriques

== Squads ==
A minimum of 16 players and a maximum of 19 players could be selected by the teams with a maximum of nine overseas players. The teams could select nine local players in the draft and another one as a wildcard. All teams released their squads ahead of the start of the season.

Los Angeles Knight Riders	MI New York	San Francisco Unicorns	Seattle Orcas	Texas Super Kings	Washington Freedom
Sunil Narine (c); Ali Khan; Unmukt Chand; Jaskaran Malhotra (wk); Nitish Kumar; Corne Dry; Ali Sheikh; Saif Badar; Shadley van Schalkwyk; Bhaskar Yadram; Andre Russell; Jason Roy; Lockie Ferguson; Martin Guptill; Adam Zampa; Rilee Rossouw; Spencer Johnson; Gajanand Singh	Kieron Pollard (c); Steven Taylor; Hammad Azam; Ehsan Adil; Nosthush Kenjige; Monank Patel (wk); Sarabjit Ladda; Shayan Jahangir (wk); Kyle Phillip; Saideep Ganesh; Trent Boult; Rashid Khan; Tim David; Dewald Brevis; David Wiese; Kagiso Rabada; Nicholas Pooran; Jason Behrendorff; Jasdeep Singh; Tristan Stubbs	Aaron Finch (c); Corey Anderson; Liam Plunkett; Tajinder Singh; Chaitanya Bishnoi; Carmi Le Roux; Brody Couch; David White; Smit Patel (wk); Sanjay Krishnamurthi; Marcus Stoinis; Lungi Ngidi; Matthew Wade (wk); Qais Ahmad; Finn Allen; Mackenzie Harvey; Haris Rauf; Shadab Khan; Amila Aponso	Wayne Parnell (c); Harmeet Singh; Shehan Jayasuriya; Shubham Ranjane; Cameron Gannon; Aaron Jones; Nauman Anwar; Phani Simhadri; Angelo Perera; Matthew Tromp; ~~Mitchell Marsh~~; Quinton de Kock (wk); Dasun Shanaka; ~~Sikandar Raza~~; Andrew Tye; Heinrich Klaasen; ~~Izharulhaq Naveed~~; Dwaine Pretorius; Nisarg Patel; Shimron Hetmyer; Imad Wasim; Hayden Walsh Jr	Faf du Plessis (c); Rusty Theron; Calvin Savage; Lahiru Milantha; Milind Kumar; Sami Aslam; Cameron Stevenson; Cody Chetty; Zia Shahzad; Saiteja Mukkamalla; Devon Conway; Mitchell Santner; Daniel Sams; David Miller; Gerald Coetzee; Dwayne Bravo; ~~Ambati Rayudu~~; Mohammad Mohsin; Imran Tahir	Moises Henriques (c); Andries Gous; Mukhtar Ahmed; Obus Pienaar; Saurabh Netravalkar; Saad Ali; Dane Piedt; Sujith Gowda; Justin Dill; Akhilesh Bodugum; ~~Wanindu Hasaranga~~; Anrich Nortje; Marco Jansen; Glenn Phillips; Adam Milne; Josh Philippe; Ben Dwarshuis; Akeal Hosein; Usman Rafiq; Tanveer Sangha; Matthew Short

- Ambati Rayudu withdrew from Major League Cricket amid a proposal made by the BCCI to enact a year-long "cooling-off" period for recently retired players. Rayudu was replaced by former CSK teammate Imran Tahir.
- Wanindu Hasaranga withdrew from Major League Cricket due to both not receiving a NOC (no-objection-certificate) from Sri Lanka Cricket and due to Hasaranga wanting to "manage his workloads". He was replaced in the squad by Tanveer Sangha.
- Mitchell Marsh was pulled out of the tournament by Cricket Australia in order to manage his workload ahead of Australia's build-up for the 2023 Cricket World Cup and due to the tournament clashing with the Ashes series.
- Sikandar Raza withdrew from Major League Cricket due to it clashing with the 2023 Zim Afro T10.

== Venues ==
Matches were held at two venues: Grand Prairie's Grand Prairie Stadium, with a capacity of 7,000 (expandable to 15,000) and Morrisville, North Carolina's Church Street Park, with a capacity of 3,500.

== Points table ==
Pos	Team	Pld	W	L	NR	Pts	NRR	Qualification
1	Seattle Orcas	5	4	1	0	8	0.725	Advanced to Qualifier
2	Texas Super Kings	5	3	2	0	6	0.570	Advanced to Qualifier
3	Washington Freedom	5	3	2	0	6	0.097	Advanced to Eliminator
4	MI New York (C)	5	2	3	0	4	1.004	Advanced to Eliminator
5	San Francisco Unicorns	5	2	3	0	4	−0.303	
6	Los Angeles Knight Riders	5	1	4	0	2	−2.028	

Source: ESPNcricinfo
(C) Champions

== League stage ==
Match 1
July 13, 2023
19:30 (N)
Scorecard

Texas Super Kings; 181/6 (20 overs)	v	Los Angeles Knight Riders; 112 (14 overs)
David Miller 61 (42); Lockie Ferguson 2/23 (4 overs)		Andre Russell 55 (34); Mohammad Mohsin 4/8 (3 overs)

Texas Super Kings won by 69 runs
Grand Prairie Stadium, Texas
Umpires: Jermaine Lindo (USA) and Paul Wilson (Aus)
Player of the match: David Miller (Texas Super Kings)

- Los Angeles Knight Riders won the toss and elected to field.

Match 2
July 14, 2023
15:30 (D/N)
Scorecard

San Francisco Unicorns; 215/5 (20 overs)	v	MI New York; 193/5 (20 overs)
Corey Anderson 91 (52); Kagiso Rabada 2/32 (4 overs)		Tim David 53* (28); Liam Plunkett 2/30 (4 overs)

San Francisco Unicorns won by 22 runs
Grand Prairie Stadium, Texas
Umpires: Aleem Dar (Pak) and Vijaya Mallela (USA)
Player of the match: Corey Anderson (San Francisco Unicorns)

- San Francisco Unicorns won the toss and elected to bat.

Match 3
July 14, 2023
19:30 (N)
Scorecard

Washington Freedom; 144/7 (20 overs)	v	Seattle Orcas; 148/5 (19.4 overs)
Akeal Hosein 33* (22); Harmeet Singh 2/24 (4 overs)		Nauman Anwar 48 (37); Moises Henriques 1/8 (2 overs)

Seattle Orcas won by 5 wickets
Grand Prairie Stadium, Texas
Umpires: Wayne Knights (NZ) and Rushane Samuels (WI)
Player of the match: Imad Wasim (Seattle Orcas)

- Seattle Orcas won the toss and elected to field.

Match 4
July 15, 2023
19:30 (N)
Scorecard

Seattle Orcas; 177/4 (20 overs)	v	San Francisco Unicorns; 142 (17.5 overs)
Heinrich Klaasen 53 (31); Liam Plunkett 2/36 (4 overs)		Shadab Khan 36 (23); Cameron Gannon 4/23 (3.5 overs)

Seattle Orcas won by 35 runs
Grand Prairie Stadium, Texas
Umpires: Aleem Dar (Pak) and Billy Taylor (Eng)
Player of the match: Heinrich Klaasen (Seattle Orcas)

- Seattle Orcas won the toss and elected to bat.

Match 5
July 16, 2023
15:30 (D/N)
Scorecard

Washington Freedom; 163/5 (20 overs)	v	Texas Super Kings; 157/7 (20 overs)
Matthew Short 80 (50); Gerald Coetzee 2/26 (4 overs)		Dwayne Bravo 76* (39); Akeal Hosein 2/25 (4 overs)

Washington Freedom won by 6 runs
Grand Prairie Stadium, Texas
Umpires: Jermaine Lindo (USA) and Paul Wilson (Aus)
Player of the match: Matthew Short (Washington Freedom)

- Washington Freedom won the toss and elected to bat.

Match 6
July 16, 2023
19:30 (N)
Scorecard

MI New York; 155/8 (20 overs)	v	Los Angeles Knight Riders; 50 (13.5 overs)
Tim David 48* (21); Corné Dry 2/10 (4 overs)		Unmukt Chand 26 (26); Nosthush Kenjige 2/7 (3 overs)

MI New York won by 105 runs
Grand Prairie Stadium, Texas
Umpires: Aleem Dar (Pak) and Billy Taylor (Eng)
Player of the match: Tim David (MI New York)

- MI New York won the toss and elected to bat.

Match 7
July 17, 2023
19:30 (N)
Scorecard

Texas Super Kings; 154/7 (20 overs)	v	MI New York; 137/8 (20 overs)
Devon Conway 74 (55); Trent Boult 2/29 (4 overs)		Shayan Jahangir 41 (38); Daniel Sams 2/15 (4 overs)

Texas Super Kings won by 17 runs
Grand Prairie Stadium, Texas
Umpires: Wayne Knights (NZ) and Jermaine Lindo (USA)
Player of the match: Devon Conway (Texas Super Kings)

- Texas Super Kings won the toss and elected to bat.

Match 8
July 18, 2023
19:30 (N)
Socrecard

San Francisco Unicorns; 212/7 (20 overs)	v	Los Angeles Knight Riders; 191/5 (20 overs)
Matthew Wade 78 (41); Adam Zampa 3/41 (4 overs)		Jason Roy 45 (21); Shadab Khan 2/26 (4 overs)

San Francisco Unicorns won by 21 runs
Grand Prairie Stadium, Texas
Umpires: Aleem Dar (Pak) and Rushane Samuels (WI)
Player of the match: Matthew Wade (San Francisco Unicorns)

- San Francisco Unicorns won the toss and elected to bat.

Match 9
July 20, 2023
17:30 (D/N)
Scorecard

Los Angeles Knight Riders; 175/7 (20 overs)	v	Washington Freedom; 177/4 (18.1 overs)
Andre Russell 70* (37); Moises Henriques 3/26 (3 overs)		Matthew Short 43 (35); Sunil Narine 1/20 (4 overs)

Washington Freedom won by 6 wickets
Church Street Park, Morrisville
Umpires: Billy Taylor (Eng) and Paul Wilson (Aus)
Player of the match: Andre Russell (Los Angeles Knight Riders)

- Washington Freedom won the toss elected to field.
- Los Angeles Knight Riders were eliminated as a result of this match.

Match 10
July 21, 2023
17:30 (D/N)
Scorecard

Texas Super Kings; 127 (20 overs)	v	Seattle Orcas; 128/2 (16 overs)
Dwayne Bravo 39 (39); Wayne Parnell 5/20 (4 overs)		Quinton de Kock 53 (36); Mitchell Santner 1/15 (3 overs)

Seattle Orcas won by 8 wickets
Church Street Park, Morrisville
Umpires: Wayne Knights (NZ) and Vijaya Mallela (USA)
Player of the match: Wayne Parnell (Seattle Orcas)

- Seattle Orcas won the toss and elected to field.
- Seattle Orcas qualified for the play-offs as a result of this match.

Match 11
July 22, 2023
17:30 (D/N)
Scorecard

Washington Freedom; 133/8 (20 overs)	v	San Francisco Unicorns; 103 (19.5 overs)
Moises Henriques 30 (27); Haris Rauf 3/20 (4 overs)		Corey Anderson 34 (34); Saurabh Netravalkar 6/9 (3.5 overs)

Washington Freedom won by 30 runs
Church Street Park, Morrisville
Umpires: Rushane Samuels (WI) and Paul Wilson (Aus)
Player of the match: Saurabh Netravalkar (Washington Freedom)

- San Francisco Unicorns won the toss and elected to field.
- Washington Freedom qualified for the play-offs as a result of this match.

Match 12
July 23, 2023
13:30
Scorecard

Seattle Orcas; 170/6 (20 overs)	v	Los Angeles Knight Riders; 175/8 (19.1 overs)
Shehan Jayasuriya 60* (45); Adam Zampa 2/26 (4 overs)		Rilee Rossouw 78* (38); Cameron Gannon 3/13 (4 overs)

Los Angeles Knight Riders won by 2 wickets
Church Street Park, Morrisville
Umpires: Reon King (WI) and Billy Taylor (Eng)
Player of the match: Rilee Rossouw (Los Angeles Knight Riders)

- Los Angeles Knight Riders won the toss and elected to field.

Match 13
July 23, 2023
17:30 (D/N)
Scorecard

Washington Freedom; 160/6 (20 overs)	v	MI New York; 161/2 (15.3 overs)
Glenn Phillips 47 (35); Kieron Pollard 2/33 (4 overs)		Nicholas Pooran 62* (33); Akeal Hosein 1/9 (2 overs)

MI New York won by 8 wickets
Church Street Park, Morrisville
Umpires: Aleem Dar (Pak) and Paul Wilson (Aus)
Player of the match: Nicholas Pooran (MI New York)

- MI New York won the toss and elected to field.

Match 14
July 24, 2023
17:30 (D/N)
Scorecard

San Francisco Unicorns; 171/8 (20 overs)	v	Texas Super Kings; 172/7 (19.1 overs)
Matthew Wade 49 (30); Gerald Coetzee 4/31 (4 overs)		Milind Kumar 52 (42); Haris Rauf 2/32 (4 overs)

Texas Super Kings won by 3 wickets
Church Street Park, Morrisville
Umpires: Jermaine Lindo (USA) and Rushane Samuels (WI)
Player of the match: Daniel Sams (Texas Super Kings)

- San Francisco Unicorns won the toss and elected to bat.
- Texas Super Kings qualified for the play-offs as a result of this match.

Match 15
July 25, 2023
17:30 (D/N)
Scorecard

MI New York; 194/8 (20 overs)	v	Seattle Orcas; 195/8 (19.2 overs)
Nicholas Pooran 68 (34); Harmeet Singh 2/21 (3 overs)		Heinrich Klassen 110* (44); Trent Boult 4/31 (4 overs)

Seattle Orcas won by 2 wickets
Church Street Park, Morrisville
Umpires: Vijaya Mallela (USA), Wayne Knights (NZ)
Player of the match: Heinrich Klassen (Seattle Orcas)

- Seattle Orcas won the toss and elected to field.
- MI New York qualified for the play-offs and San Francisco Unicorns were eliminated as a result of this match.

== Play-offs ==
Qualifier / Eliminator
July 27, 2023 – Texas 19:30 CDT
1	Seattle Orcas	127/1 (15 overs)
2	Texas Super Kings	126/9 (20 overs)
July 27, 2023 – Texas, 15:30 CDT
3	Washington Freedom	125/9 (20 overs)
4	MI New York	141/7 (20 overs)

Challenger
July 28, 2023 – Texas, 19:30 CDT
QL	Texas Super Kings	158 (20 overs)
EW	MI New York	162/4 (19 overs)

Final
July 30, 2023 – Texas, 19:30 CDT
QW	Seattle Orcas	183/9 (20 overs)
CW	MI New York	184/3 (16 overs)

Eliminator
July 27, 2023
15:30 (D/N)
Scorecard

MI New York; 141/7 (20 overs)	v	Washington Freedom; 125/9 (20 overs)
Dewald Brevis 57 (41); Saurabh Netravalkar 2/25 (4 overs)		Marco Jansen 28 (18); Trent Boult 4/20 (4 overs)

MI New York won by 16 runs
Grand Prairie Stadium, Texas
Umpires: Aleem Dar (Pak) and Rushane Samuels (WI)
Player of the match: Dewald Brevis (MI New York)

- Washington Freedom won the toss and elected to field.

Qualifier
July 27, 2023
19:30 (N)
Scorecard

Texas Super Kings; 126/9 (20 overs)	v	Seattle Orcas; 127/1 (15 overs)
Daniel Sams 26* (25); Andrew Tye 3/32 (4 overs)		Quinton de Kock 88* (50); Rusty Theron 1/20 (3 overs)

Seattle Orcas won by 9 wickets
Grand Prairie Stadium, Texas
Umpires: Vijay Mallela (USA) and Billy Taylor (Eng)
Player of the match: Quinton de Kock (Seattle Orcas)

- Texas Super Kings won the toss and elected to bat.

Challenger
July 28, 2023
19:30 (N)
Scorecard

Texas Super Kings; 158 (20 overs)	v	MI New York; 162/4 (19 overs)
Devon Conway 38 (35); Trent Boult 4/24 (4 overs)		Dewald Brevis 41* (33); Rusty Theron 1/12 (2 overs)

MI New York won by 6 wickets
Grand Prairie Stadium, Texas
Umpires: Jermaine Lindo (USA) and Paul Wilson (Aus)
Player of the match: Trent Boult (MI New York)

- MI New York won the toss and elected to field.

=== Final ===
July 30, 2023
19:30 (N)
Scorecard

Seattle Orcas; 183/9 (20 overs)	v	MI New York; 184/3 (16 overs)
Quinton de Kock 87 (52); Rashid Khan 3/9 (4 overs)		Nicholas Pooran 137* (55); Imad Wasim 1/14 (2 overs)

MI New York won by 7 wickets
Grand Prairie Stadium, Texas
Umpires: Wayne Knights (NZ) and Paul Wilson (Aus)
Player of the match: Nicholas Pooran (MI New York)

- MI New York won the toss and elected to field.
- The MI New York won the inaugural Major League Cricket tournament as a result of this match.

== Statistics ==
=== Most runs ===
Most runs in the 2023 Major League Cricket
Player	Team	Innings	Runs	High score
Nicholas Pooran	MI New York	8	388	137*
Quinton de Kock	Seattle Orcas	7	264	88*
Heinrich Klaasen	Seattle Orcas	6	235	110*
Devon Conway	Texas Super Kings	7	221	74
Tim David	MI New York	7	209	53*

=== Most wickets ===
Most wickets in the 2023 Major League Cricket
Player	Team	Matches	Wickets	Best bowling
Trent Boult	MI New York	8	22	4/20
Cameron Gannon	Seattle Orcas	7	11	4/23
Andrew Tye	Seattle Orcas	7	11	3/32
Imad Wasim	Seattle Orcas	7	10	2/23
Saurabh Netravalkar	Washington Freedom	6	10	6/9

== Awards ==
On July 28, 2023, a list of end of season awards was announced.

Awards in the 2023 Major League Cricket
Name	Team	Award
Nicholas Pooran	MI New York	Most Valuable Player
Nicholas Pooran	MI New York	Leading run scorer
Trent Boult	MI New York	Leading wicket taker
Cameron Gannon	Seattle Orcas	Domestic Player of the Series

== Broadcasting ==
In July 2023, Major League Cricket (MLC) announced that its inaugural season will be broadcast live in major cricketing nations.

Broadcast rights for the 2023 Major League Cricket
Country	Television channel	Internet streaming applications
India	Sports18	JioCinema
United States & Canada	Willow TV; Sling TV (Select matches); CBS Sports (Select matches)	
Australia	Fox Cricket	
Pakistan	A Sports	

== See also ==
- 2023 Minor League Cricket season
