= 2023 Major League Cricket final =

Cricket match

- Event: 2023 Major League Cricket season
Seattle Orcas	MI New York
183/9	184/3
20 overs	16 overs
- MI New York won by 7 wickets
- Date: July 30, 2023
- Venue: Grand Prairie Stadium, Grand Prairie
- Player of the match: Nicholas Pooran (MI New York)
- Umpires: Wayne Knights (New Zealand); Paul Wilson (Australia)
- Attendance: 8,000

The 2023 Major League Cricket final was a day/night 20-over cricket match played on July 30, 2023, at Grand Prairie Stadium in Grand Prairie, Texas between the Seattle Orcas and the MI New York to determine the winner of the inaugural season of Major League Cricket. The MI New York won the match and the title by defeating the Seattle Orcas by 6 wickets. MI New York player, Nicholas Pooran, was named man of the match for his 55-ball 137*.

== Background ==
On June 13, 2023, the schedule for the 2023 season of Major League Cricket was released. 2 venues, Grand Prairie Stadium in Grand Prairie, Texas and Church Street Park in Morrisville, North Carolina were scheduled to host the games. The play-off schedule was announced on the same day, with Grand Prairie due to host all play-off matches. The final was played between Seattle and New York on July 30, with the latter winning the title by 7 wickets.

== Road to the final ==
Seattle Orcas				MI New York
League Stage
Opponent	Scorecard	Result	Titles	Opponent	Scorecard	Result
Washington Freedom	July 14, 2023	Won	Match 1	San Francisco Unicorns	July 14, 2023	Lost
San Francisco Unicorns	July 15, 2023	Won	Match 2	Los Angeles Knight Riders	July 16, 2023	Won
Texas Super Kings	July 21, 2023	Won	Match 3	Texas Super Kings	July 17, 2023	Lost
Los Angeles Knight Riders	July 23, 2023	Lost	Match 4	Washington Freedom	July 23, 2023	Won
MI New York	July 24, 2023	Won	Match 5	Seattle Orcas	July 24, 2023	Lost
Playoff stage
Qualifier
Opponent	Scorecard	Result	Titles	Opponent	Scorecard	Result
Texas Super Kings	July 27, 2023	Won	Match 6
Eliminator
Opponent	Scorecard	Result	Titles
			Match 7	Washington Freedom	July 27, 2023	Won
Challenger
Opponent	Scorecard	Result	Titles
			Match 8	Texas Super Kings	July 28, 2023	Won
2023 Major League Cricket final

=== Group stage ===
In the start to their inaugural campaign, the Orcas went top of the table by recording a 5-wicket win over the Washington Freedom, a 35-run win over the San Francisco Unicorns, and an 8-wicket win over the Texas Super Kings. The Orcas' winning streak was snapped, however, during a 2-wicket defeat to the Los Angeles Knight Riders. A 2-wicket win over MI New York assured the Orcas' a first-place finish going into the finals nevertheless.

In contrast, New York began their campaign with a 22-run defeat to San Francisco. This was followed by a 105-run win over Los Angeles in their second game, a 17-run loss to Texas in their third, and a 8-wicket win over Washington in their fourth. In their final group stage game, they lost to table-toppers Seattle by 2 wickets. Despite the loss, they nevertheless still qualified for the play-offs.

=== Playoffs ===
The playoffs were played in a similar fashion to the Big Bash League, with Seattle defeating Texas by 9 wickets in the Qualifier and New York recording back-to-back victories against Washington and Texas in the Eliminator and Challenger matches, respectively, to go to the finals.

Eliminator
July 27, 2023
15:30 (D/N)
Scorecard

MI New York; 141/7 (20 overs)	v	Washington Freedom; 125/9 (20 overs)
Dewald Brevis 57 (41); Saurabh Netravalkar 2/25 (4 overs)		Marco Jansen 28 (18); Trent Boult 4/20 (4 overs)

MI New York won by 16 runs
Grand Prairie Stadium, Texas
Umpires: Aleem Dar (Pak) and Rushane Samuels (WI)
Player of the match: Dewald Brevis (MI New York)

- Washington Freedom won the toss and elected to field.

Qualifier
July 27, 2023
19:30 (N)
Scorecard

Texas Super Kings; 126/9 (20 overs)	v	Seattle Orcas; 127/1 (15 overs)
Daniel Sams 26* (25); Andrew Tye 3/32 (4 overs)		Quinton de Kock 88* (50); Rusty Theron 1/20 (3 overs)

Seattle Orcas won by 9 wickets
Grand Prairie Stadium, Texas
Umpires: Vijay Mallela (USA) and Billy Taylor (Eng)
Player of the match: Quinton de Kock (Seattle Orcas)

- Texas Super Kings won the toss and elected to bat.

Challenger
July 28, 2023
19:30 (N)
Scorecard

Texas Super Kings; 158 (20 overs)	v	MI New York; 162/4 (19 overs)
Devon Conway 38 (35); Trent Boult 4/24 (4 overs)		Dewald Brevis 41* (33); Rusty Theron 1/12 (2 overs)

MI New York won by 6 wickets
Grand Prairie Stadium, Texas
Umpires: Jermaine Lindo (USA) and Paul Wilson (Aus)
Player of the match: Trent Boult (MI New York)

- MI New York won the toss and elected to field.

== Match ==
=== Match officials ===
- On-field umpires: Wayne Knights (NZ) and Paul Wilson (AUS)
- Third umpire: Billy Taylor (ENG)
- Reserve umpire: Jermaine Lindo (USA)
- Match referee: Simon Taufel (AUS)
- Toss: MI New York won the toss and elected to field.

=== Summary ===
Following New York's decision to field first, Quinton de Kock played a brilliant knock of 87 runs off 56 deliveries, with Shubham Ranjane's 29 off 16 and Dwaine Pretorius's cameo of 21 runs off 7 taking Seattle to 183 runs for the loss of 9 wickets. With the ball for New York, Rashid Khan and Trent Boult both picked up 3 wickets a piece, with Steven Taylor and David Wiese taking a wicket each. In the chase, Imad Wasim and Wayne Parnell got some early breakthroughs for Seattle but couldn't stop Nicholas Pooran's stunning knock of 137* off 55 deliveries taking New York to a maiden MLC title.

=== Seattle Orcas innings ===
Seattle got off to a slow start, with New York's Trent Boult and spinners keeping Quinton de Kock and Nauman Anwar in check. Anwar eventually fell in the fourth over to Rashid Khan, trying to loft a back-of-a-length delivery over leg. de Kock and Shehan Jayasuriya steadied the innings, accumulating 41 runs for the second wicket, before Jayasuriya was out caught and bowled by Steven Taylor. Hienrich Klaasen, too, fell for 4 off Rashid's bowling in the twelfth over. Thunderbolts' player Shubham Ranjane then came in a played a cameo of 29 as de Kock fell for 87 to Trent Boult. Imad Wasim and Andrew Tye fell for relatively low scores in the death before Pretorius's cameo of 21 in the final over powered Seattle to 183 for 9.

=== MI New York innings ===
In response to Seattle's 183 for 9, New York's Steven Taylor was bowled by Wasim early into the innings, trying to loft a shot for a maximum. Even as Nicholas Pooran was unleashing a blistering assault at the other end, Shayan Jahangir failed to pick up the pace and was eventually caught by Tye off Parnell for 10. Dewald Brevis then came into the mix, with him rotating the strike back to Pooran, who was single-handedly winning the game for New York. Seattle's bowlers were unable to find a response against Pooran, before they finally found a breakthrough after Brevis was run out for 20. With the score 137/3 after 12.2, Pooran and Tim David steered the chase and won the game for New York by 7 wickets.

Final
July 30, 2023
19:30 (N)
Scorecard

Seattle Orcas; 183/9 (20 overs)	v	MI New York; 184/3 (16 overs)
Quinton de Kock 87 (52); Rashid Khan 3/9 (4 overs)		Nicholas Pooran 137* (55); Imad Wasim 1/14 (2 overs)

MI New York won by 7 wickets
Grand Prairie Stadium, Texas
Umpires: Wayne Knights (NZ) and Paul Wilson (Aus)
Player of the match: Nicholas Pooran (MI New York)

- MI New York won the toss and elected to field.
- The MI New York won the inaugural Major League Cricket tournament as a result of this match.

=== Scorecard ===
Seattle Orcas innings
Player	Status	Runs	Balls	4s	6s	Strike rate
Quinton de Kock†	b Boult	87	52	9	4	167.30
Nauman Anwar	st †Pooran b Rashid Khan	9	13	1	0	69.23
Shehan Jayasuriya	c & b Taylor	16	15	1	1	106.66
Heinrich Klaasen	c Boult b Rashid Khan	4	7	0	0	57.14
Shubham Ranjane	c Kenjige b Boult	29	16	5	0	181.25
Imad Wasim	c Wiese b Rashid Khan	7	6	1	0	116.66
Dwaine Pretorius	c David b Wiese	21	7	3	1	300.00
Andrew Tye	c Jasdeep Singh b Boult	1	2	0	0	50.00
Wayne Parnell (c)	run out (Brevis/Wiese/†Pooran)	2	1	0	0	200.00
Harmeet Singh	not out	2	1	0	0	200.00
Cameron Gannon	did not bat					
Extras 5 ( lb 1, wd 4); Total 183/9 (20 overs)				20	6	9.15 RR

Fall of wickets: 25/1 (Nauman Anwar, 4.1 ov.), 66/2 (Shehan Jayasuriya, 9.1 ov.), 91/3 (Heinrich Klaasen, 12.1 ov.), 142/4 (Quinton de Kock†, 16.1 ov.), 157/5 (Imad Wasim, 17.6 ov.), 157/6 (Shubham Ranjane, 18.1 ov.), 163/7 (Andrew Tye, 18.5 ov.), 181/8 (Dwaine Pretorius, 19.5 ov.), 183/9 (Wayne Parnell, 19.6 ov.)

MI New York bowling
Bowler	Overs	Maidens	Runs	Wickets	Econ	Wides	NBs
Trent Boult	4	0	34	3	8.50	1	0
Jasdeep Singh	2	0	33	0	16.50	0	0
Rashid Khan	4	0	9	3	2.25	0	0
Steven Taylor	4	0	25	1	6.25	0	0
David Wiese	4	0	65	1	16.25	3	0
Nosthush Kenjige	1	0	8	0	8.00	0	0
Tim David	1	0	8	0	8.00	0	0

MI New York innings
Player	Status	Runs	Balls	4s	6s	Strike rate
Steven Taylor	b Imad Wasim	0	3	0	0	0.00
Shayan Jahangir	c Tye b Parnell	10	11	0	1	90.90
Nicholas Pooran†	not out	137	55	10	13	249.09
Dewald Brevis	run out (Harmeet Singh)	20	18	2	1	111.11
Tim David	not out	10	9	1	0	111.11
Hammad Azam	did not bat					
David Wiese	did not bat					
Rashid Khan	did not bat					
Nosthush Kenjige	did not bat					
Trent Boult	did not bat					
Jasdeep Singh	did not bat					
Extras 7 (lb 1, wd 6); Total 184/3 (16 overs)				13	15	11.50 RR

Fall of wickets: 0/1 (Steven Taylor, 0.3 ov.), 62/2 (Shayan Jahangir, 4.6 ov.), 137/3 (Dewald Brevis, 12.2 ov.)

Seattle Orcas bowling
Bowler	Overs	Maidens	Runs	Wickets	Econ	Wides	NBs
Imad Wasim	2	0	14	1	7.00	0	0
Cameron Gannon	4	0	36	0	9.00	0	0
Dwaine Pretorius	3	0	47	0	15.66	1	0
Wayne Parnell	2	0	22	1	11.00	1	0
Andrew Tye	2	0	27	0	13.50	0	0
Harmeet Singh	3	0	37	0	12.33	3	0
