= James Taylor (cricketer, born 1974) =

English cricketer

Personal information
- Full name: James Lee Taylor
- Born: 2 November 1974 (age 52); Southampton, Hampshire, England
- Batting: Right-handed
- Bowling: Right-arm medium
- Relatives: Billy Taylor (brother)

Domestic team information
- Years: Team
- 1996–2002: Wiltshire

Career statistics
Competition	List A
Matches	5
Runs scored	117
Batting average	29.25
100s/50s	0/0
Top score	49
Balls bowled	12
Wickets	1
Bowling average	19.00
5 wickets in innings	0
10 wickets in match	0
Best bowling	1/19
Catches/stumpings	3/–
- Source: Cricinfo, 10 October 2010

James Lee Taylor (born 2 November 1974) is a former English cricketer who played for Wiltshire County Cricket Club. He was born at Southampton in Hampshire.

Taylor made his Minor Counties Championship debut for Wiltshire in 1996 against Oxfordshire. From 1996 to 2001, he represented the county in 35 Minor Counties Championship matches, the last of which came against Wales Minor Counties, and in 15 MCCA Knockout Trophy matches.

Taylor also played five times for Wiltshire in List-A cricket between 1999 and 2002, making his List A debut against Northamptonshire Cricket Board in the 1999 NatWest Trophy.

Taylor has played for Totton and Eling Cricket Club in the Southern Premier Cricket League. His brother Billy is a first-class umpire who played first-class cricket for Hampshire and Sussex as well as Minor Counties cricket for Wiltshire.
