= Rushil Ugarkar =

American cricketer

Personal information
- Full name: Rushil Jayraj Ugarkar
- Born: 30 June 2003 (age 23); St. Louis, Missouri, United States
- Batting: Right-handed
- Bowling: Right-arm fast medium
- Role: Bowler

International information
- National side: United States (2025-present)
- ODI debut (cap 51): 26 October 2025 v Nepal
- Last ODI: 28 October 2025 v United Arab Emirates

Domestic team information
- Years: Team
- 2021: Silicon Valley Strikers
- 2023: Dallas Mustangs
- 2024-present: Bay Blazers
- 2024-present: MI New York

Career statistics
Competition	Twenty20
Matches	10
Runs scored	0
Batting average	0.00
100s/50s	0/0
Top score	0*
Balls bowled	190
Wickets	11
Bowling average	24.45
5 wickets in innings	0
10 wickets in match	0
Best bowling	3/19
Catches/stumpings	0/–
- Source: ESPNcricinfo, 4 August 2025

Rushil Jayraj Ugarkar (born June 30, 2003) is an American cricketer who plays for MI New York in Major League Cricket (MLC). Born in Missouri, Ugarkar moved to Bengaluru in India with his family at an early age, attending the Ebenezer International School there. During his time in Bengaluru, Ugarkar picked up cricket and began to attend academy training sessions alongside fellow American Sanjay Krishnamurthi. However, following the COVID-19 pandemic, Krishnamurthi and he both moved back, aiming to play for the national team.

Upon returning, Ugarkar had a brief stint with Minor League Cricket's Silicon Valley Strikers in 2021, before his selection by the Dallas Mustangs for the 2023 season. His performance during the tournament earned him a spot as a U21 player on MI New York's squad in 2024. Retained for the 2025 season, Ugarkar took a bigger role in the team as he began to bowl quicker and take wickets.
