= Billy Taylor (cricketer, born 1977) =

English cricketer and umpire (born 1977)

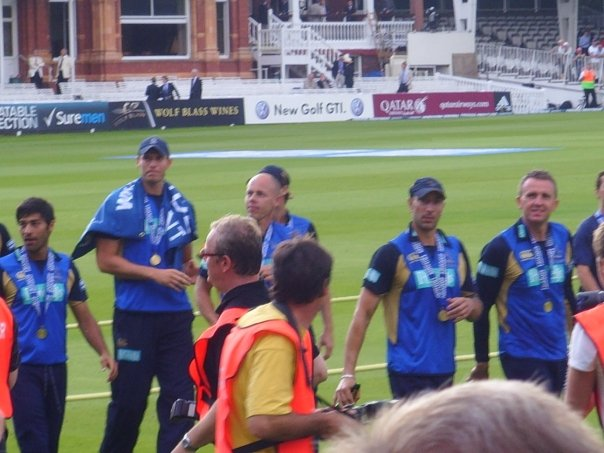
- Taylor, middle of image

Personal information
- Full name: Billy Victor Taylor
- Born: 11 January 1977 (age 49); Southampton, Hampshire, England
- Height: 6 ft 2 in (1.88 m)
- Batting: Left-handed
- Bowling: Right-arm medium-fast
- Relatives: James Taylor (brother)

Domestic team information
- Years: Team
- 1997–1999: Wiltshire
- 1999–2003: Sussex (squad no. 22)
- 2004–2009: Hampshire (squad no. 45)

Umpiring information
- WTests umpired: 1 (2014)
- WODIs umpired: 1 (2011)
- FC umpired: 85 (2012–2023)
- LA umpired: 41 (2011–2022)
- T20 umpired: 100 (2011–2025)

Career statistics
Competition	FC	LA	T20
Matches	54	142	37
Runs scored	431	191	22
Batting average	10.26	6.36	22.00
100s/50s	0/0	0/0	0/0
Top score	40	21*	12*
Balls bowled	8,412	6,311	713
Wickets	136	182	30
Bowling average	33.34	25.81	29.43
5 wickets in innings	4	1	0
10 wickets in match	0	0	0
Best bowling	6/32	5/28	2/9
Catches/stumpings	6/–	26/–	3/0
- Source: ESPNcricinfo, 27 August 2009

Billy Victor Taylor (born 11 January 1977) is an English former cricketer who played first-class cricket for both Hampshire and Sussex. He played for Sussex from 1999 to 2003, and was a member of the Sussex team that won their first ever County Championship in 2003. After struggling to establish himself at Sussex, Taylor joined Hampshire ahead of the 2004 season. He would play for Hampshire until 2009, after which he became an umpire and was appointed to the ECB Full Umpires List in 2016.

== Early life ==
Taylor was born in January 1977 in Southampton, where he was educated at Bitterne Park School. He began playing club cricket in Winchester alongside his brothers, James and Martin. A right-arm medium-fast bowler, he initially trialled with Hampshire, but was rejected in 1997. Instead, he began playing minor counties cricket for Wiltshire, having debuted for the county against Shropshire in the 1996 Minor Counties Championship. He had a pre-season trial with Sussex in 1998, impressing enough for them to sign him. Whilst awaiting his Sussex first team debut, Taylor continued to play minor counties cricket for Wiltshire; it was for Wiltshire that he made his debut in List A one-day cricket against the Northamptonshire Cricket Board in the first round of the 1999 NatWest Trophy.

== Cricket career ==
=== Sussex ===
Two months later, he made his senior Sussex debut in a one-day match against Middlesex at Arundel in the National League; Taylor made ten one-day appearances for Sussex in 1999, but featured in just one first-class match against Derbyshire in the County Championship. He featured five times in the 2000 County Championship, but took just 6 wickets at an expensive average of 67.50. At the time, Sussex under the captaincy of Chris Adams, operated a football-style rotation system to help keep their bowlers fit throughout the season, with Taylor coming into the Sussex team to cover their main strike bowlers. In one-day cricket during the 2000 season, Taylor made thirteen appearances and took 18 wickets at an average of 21.61; he put in a man-of-the-match display in the third round of the NatWest Trophy against the Middlesex Cricket Board, taking 4 for 26. Prior to the start of the 2001 season, Taylor required surgery for a stress-fracture on his heel which he had suffered while playing club cricket in New Zealand, meaning he missed Sussex's pre-season tour of Grenada. He subsequently missed the first two weeks of the season, having broken a finger. His eleven one-day appearances in 2001 yielded him 15 wickets at an average of 21.60, with his four first-class appearances bringing him 8 wickets.

Taylor made ten first-class appearances during the 2002 season, largely due to the absences of Paul Hutchison, James Kirtley and Jason Lewry at various points throughout the season. In his ten appearances, he enjoyed success with 32 wickets at an average of 32.53. The highlight of his first-class season was his maiden five wicket haul (5 for 90), taken against Warwickshire. He featured extensively in one-day cricket during the 2002 season, with 27 appearances. Against Middlesex in the Benson & Hedges Cup, he claimed his maiden five wicket haul (5 for 28) in one-day cricket, whilst the following day against Surrey, he took a hat-trick. He would finish the season as Sussex's leading one-day wicket-taker. Despite his success in 2002, Taylor described himself as feeling "disillusioned" when Sussex failed to offer him an extension to his contract, which was due to expire at the end of the 2003 season.

Taylor found himself an infrequent member of Sussex's 2003 County Championship winning side, but did come into the side for the injured Kirtley in final matches of the season. He played in their victory against Leicestershire, which secured Sussex their first-ever County Championship title. In seven first-class appearances that season, he took 23 wickets at an average of 29.60. In one-day cricket, he made fifteen appearances, taking 20 wickets at an average of 31.95. Following the season, Taylor was offered a new contract, but he rejected this after he could not be guaranteed regular opportunities in the County Championship. He was subsequently released, alongside fellow bowler Shaun Rashid. In 28 first-class matches for Sussex, he took 71 wickets at an average of 35.11, In 76 one-day appearances, he took 109 wickets at an average of 22.89.

=== Hampshire ===
In October 2003, Taylor signed a three-year contract with Hampshire. He made his Hampshire debut against Durham at the Rose Bowl in the 2004 County Championship. He made eleven first-class appearances during his maiden season at Hampshire, taking 33 wickets at an average of 31.48; his best figures of the season, 5 for 73, contributed to Hampshire's 114 runs victory against Essex. Alongside twelve one-day appearance in 2004, Taylor also made his Twenty20 debut against Essex in the Twenty20 Cup, featuring in six matches in the competition. Taylor featured infrequently for Hampshire during the 2005 season, with eight first-class and seven one-day appearances. Against Gloucestershire that season in the County Championship, he claimed career-best figures of 6 for 45 and helped Hampshire claim what had looked like an unlikely victory.

In the first match of the 2006 County Championship against Middlesex, Taylor took the first ever hat-trick at the Rose Bowl, on the way to career best figures of 6 for 32. In six first-class appearances that season, he took 12 wickets at an average of 30.33. He featured more in one-day matches in 2006, making fifteen appearances in which he took 15 wickets at an average of 27.20. Having not featured in Twenty20 matches in 2005, Taylor made eight appearances in the 2006 Twenty20 Cup, taking 8 wickets. Taylor was awarded his county cap in 2006. Following the 2006 season, Taylor was utilised as a one-day specialist. He made just one further first-class appearance in the 2009 County Championship. Having appeared in seven one-day matches in 2007, Taylor featured in fourteen and ten matches in 2008 and 2009 respectively, taking 16 and 18 wickets respectively. In 23 Twenty20 appearances between 2007 and 2009, he took a total of 18 wickets. On 27 August 2009, Rod Bransgrove announced that the club had released Taylor, ending his five-year tenure at the club.

== Umpiring career ==
In 2011, he was added to the England and Wales Cricket Board list of reserve umpires, alongside Russell Evans and Alex Wharf. In July 2011, he stood in a Women's One Day International between England and Australia at Lord's; three years later in August 2014, he would stand in a Women's Test match between England and India at Wormsley. Having first stood as umpire in senior men's domestic cricket in 2011, Taylor was appointed to the ECB Full Umpires List in January 2016, following the retirement of Mark Benson. As of 2026, he has stood in 85 first-class, 41 one-day, and 100 Twenty20 matches. In 2024, he officiated in the Major League Cricket season and returned for the 2025 Major League Cricket season.
