= Zia Shahzad =

Pakistani cricketer (born 1996)

Personal information
- Full name: Zia Mohammad Shahzad
- Born: 18 June 1996 (age 30)
- Batting: Right-handed
- Bowling: Right-arm leg break
- Role: All-rounder

Domestic team information
- Years: Team
- 2023-present: Texas Super Kings

Career statistics
Competition	FC	T20
Matches	2
Runs scored	12
Batting average	4.00
100s/50s	0/0
Top score	6
Balls bowled	108
Wickets	1
Bowling average	78.0
5 wickets in innings	0
10 wickets in match	0
Best bowling	1/37
Catches/stumpings	1/-
- Source: Cricinfo, 24 July 2024

Zia Shahzad (born 18 June 1996) is a Pakistani-born cricketer who plays for Golden State Grizzlies.

== Career ==
Zia made his List A debut for Lahore Blues in the 2018–19 Quaid-e-Azam One Day Cup on 22 September 2018. He made his first-class debut for Lahore Blues in the 2018–19 Quaid-e-Azam Trophy on 13 November 2018.

In June 2023, Shahzad was drafted in Round 8 by the Texas Super Kings to play in the inaugural season of Major League Cricket in one of the 9 available domestic player slots.
