= Cameron Gannon =

Australian-American cricketer

Personal information
- Full name: Cameron John Gannon
- Born: 23 January 1989 (age 37); Baulkham Hills, New South Wales, Australia
- Batting: Right-handed
- Bowling: Right-arm fast-medium
- Role: Bowling all-rounder

International information
- National side: United States
- T20I debut (cap 13): 18 August 2019 v Bermuda
- Last T20I: 22 August 2019 v Bermuda
- T20I shirt no.: 21

Domestic team information
- Years: Team
- 2010/11–2019/20, 2026/27–present: Queensland (squad no. 21)
- 2012/13–2014/15: Brisbane Heat (squad no. 42)
- 2015/16: Melbourne Renegades (squad no. 21)
- 2016/17: Melbourne Stars (squad no. 21)
- 2017/18: Brisbane Heat (squad no. 21)
- 2020/21–2025/26: Western Australia
- 2023–present: Seattle Orcas
- 2024/25–: Hobart Hurricanes (squad no. 5)

Career statistics
Competition	T20I	FC	LA	T20
Matches	4	70	26	54
Runs scored	12	1,070	124	185
Batting average	12.00	13.20	15.50	10.88
100s/50s	0/0	0/2	0/0	0/0
Top score	7*	58	28	23
Balls bowled	54	13,953	1,396	1,034
Wickets	3	250	38	56
Bowling average	22.33	25.87	28.57	28.12
5 wickets in innings	0	8	1	0
10 wickets in match	0	0	0	0
Best bowling	2/21	6/53	5/38	4/10
Catches/stumpings	2/–	61/–	10/–	19/–
- Source: ESPNcricinfo, 23 October 2026

Cameron John Gannon (born 23 January 1989) is an Australian-American cricketer who plays international cricket for United States and Australian domestic cricket for Queensland.

== Domestic career ==
Born in Baulkham Hills, New South Wales, Gannon is one of the Ipswich Grammar School Old Boys. He began playing cricket as a junior with Ipswich Brothers and Ipswich Grammar School. Aged 19 he played for a season in Reading, England, for the Sonning Club.

Gannon made his first-class debut in a Sheffield Shield match against Tasmania in October 2010. Gannon signed with the Brisbane Heat in 2012 and made his Twenty20 debut in the 2012–13 Big Bash League season.

From 2015 to 2017 he had stints with both the Melbourne Renegades and the Melbourne Stars.

In June 2020, Gannon joined Western Australia on a three-year deal. In 2024 he was one of Western Australia's best players in their Sheffield Shield win over Tasmania.

Gannon was named as a replacement player for the Hobart Hurricanes in January 2025. He played the last three games of the 2024–25 Big Bash League season, including the final.

Following a career-best 42 wickets in the 2025–26 Sheffield Shield with Western Australia, Gannon returned to Queensland for the 2026–27 season.

== International career ==
In August 2019, he was named in the United States' squad for the Regional Finals of the 2018–19 ICC T20 World Cup Americas Qualifier tournament. He made his Twenty20 International (T20I) debut for the United States against Bermuda on 18 August 2019. He is qualified through his mother, who is American.

In January 2021, USA Cricket named Gannon in a 44-man squad to begin training in Texas ahead of the 2021 Oman Tri-Nation Series.

Gannon was not selected for the United States team for the 2024 T20 World Cup, as he didn't play in their selection tournament. This was due to him playing first class cricket for Western Australia at the time.
