= Corné Dry =

South African cricketer (born 1993)

Personal information
- Born: 4 February 1993 (age 33); Cape Town, South Africa
- Batting: Right handed
- Bowling: Right arm Medium fast
- Role: Allrounder

Domestic team information
- Years: Team
- 2023-present: Los Angeles Knight Riders
- Source: Cricinfo, 5 November 2015

Corné Dry (born 4 February 1993) is a South African-American cricketer who played for the Knights cricket team. He was the joint-leading wicket-taker in the 2017–18 CSA Provincial One-Day Challenge tournament for Free State, with 13 dismissals in eight matches. He was also the leading wicket-taker in the 2017–18 Sunfoil 3-Day Cup for Free State, with 26 dismissals in ten matches.

In September 2018, Dry was named in Free State's squad for the 2018 Africa T20 Cup. In June 2021, Dry was selected in the players' draft ahead of the Minor League Cricket tournament in the United States.
