= Wayne Parnell =

South African cricketer (born 1989)

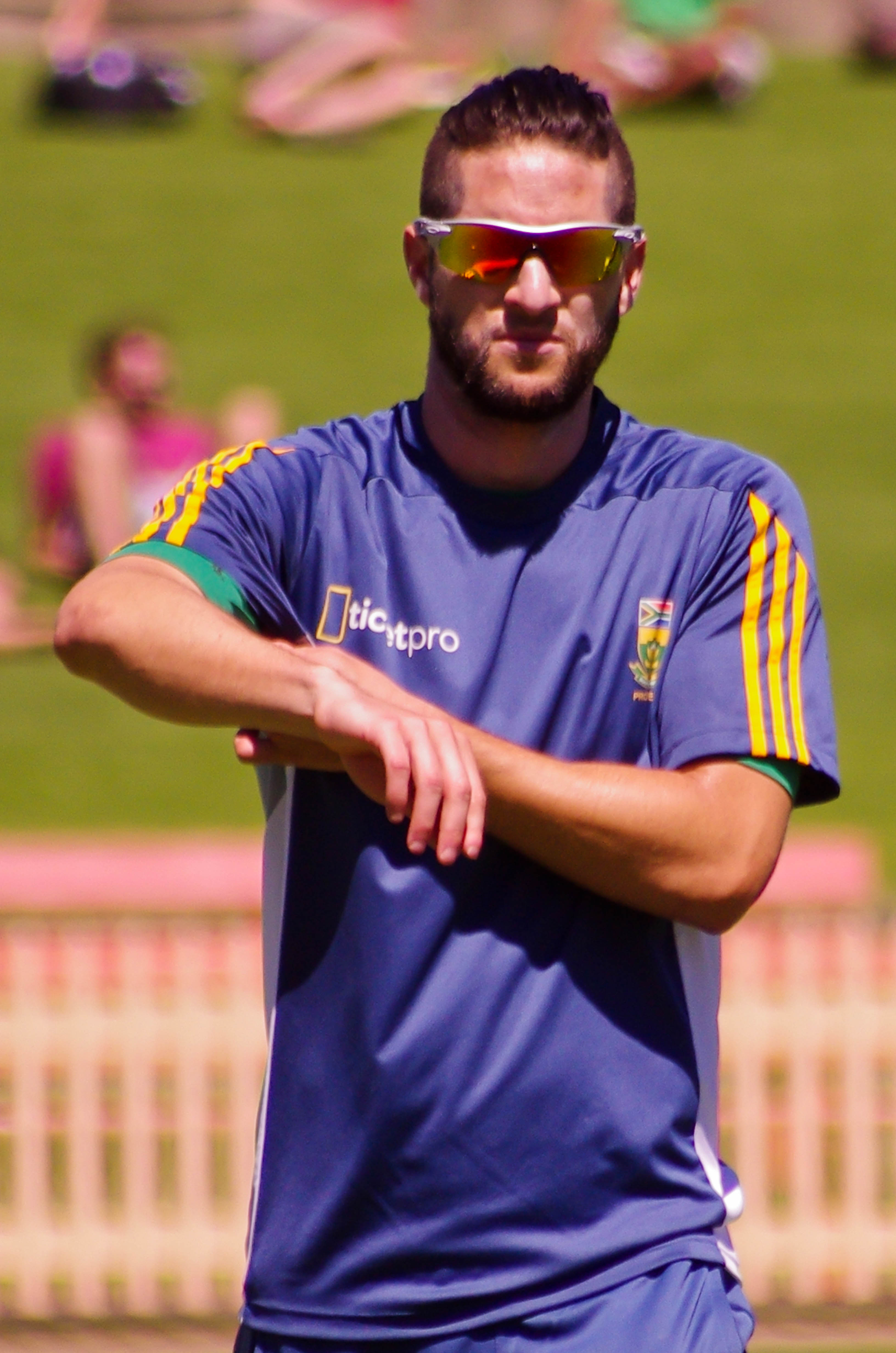
- Parnell in 2010

Personal information
- Full name: Wayne Dillon Parnell
- Born: 30 July 1989 (age 37); Port Elizabeth, Cape Province, South Africa
- Nickname: Pigeon
- Height: 6 ft 2 in (1.88 m)
- Batting: Left-handed
- Bowling: Left-arm medium-fast
- Role: Bowler

International information
- National side: South Africa (2009–2023)
- Test debut (cap 307): 14 January 2010 v England
- Last Test: 6 October 2017 v Bangladesh
- ODI debut (cap 94): 30 January 2009 v Australia
- Last ODI: 21 March 2023 v West Indies
- ODI shirt no.: 7
- T20I debut (cap 39): 13 January 2009 v Australia
- Last T20I: 28 March 2023 v West Indies

Domestic team information
- Years: Team
- 2006/07–2010/11 (Note: Not every team that Parnell has played for is listed here. Only teams he played for in more than one season are included.): Eastern Province
- 2008/09–2017/18: Warriors
- 2009; 2017: Kent
- 2011–2013: Pune Warriors
- 2010; 2014: Delhi Daredevils
- 2015/16–2017/18: Cape Cobras
- 2015/16–present: Western Province
- 2016–2017: Barbados Tridents
- 2018–2019: Worcestershire
- 2022–2023: Northern Superchargers
- 2022/23–2023/24: Pretoria Capitals

Career statistics
Competition	Test	ODI	FC	LA
Matches	6	73	84	187
Runs scored	67	574	2,728	2,267
Batting average	16.75	20.50	27.55	23.61
100s/50s	0/0	0/1	2/17	2/6
Top score	23	56	111*	129
Balls bowled	556	3,224	12,635	8,296
Wickets	15	99	242	248
Bowling average	27.60	30.40	29.91	30.22
5 wickets in innings	0	2	9	5
10 wickets in match	0	0	2	0
Best bowling	4/51	5/48	7/51	6/51
Catches/stumpings	3/–	13/–	25/–	35/–
- Source: ESPNcricinfo, 27 May 2024

Wayne Dillon Parnell (born 30 July 1989) is a South African professional cricketer who has played Test, One Day International and Twenty20 International cricket for the South Africa national cricket team. At domestic level he played for Cape Cobras, Warriors and Eastern Province in South Africa and for a range of teams in competitions around the world.

== Early life and education ==
Parnell was born in Port Elizabeth in 1989. He attended Grey High School in his home town, leaving in 2007. He studied Human Resource Management at Nelson Mandela Metropolitan University in Port Elizabeth.

== Domestic cricket ==
Parnell made his first-class cricket debut for Eastern Province in October 2006, at the age of seventeen, against South Western Districts scoring 17 and taking one wicket. In his second first-class match, he recorded figures of four for seven, and, in only his fifth first-class match, he took a hat-trick against Western Province: all three batsman were bowled. He was described as "the most talked about cricketer to hit the first-class scene for some time."

In 2008 Parnell was awarded the under-19 Player of the Tournament and the CSA U19 Cricketer of the Year awards while representing Eastern Province.

In February 2022, Parnell was named as the captain of Western Province for the 2021–22 CSA T20 Challenge.

=== County cricket ===
At the start of the 2009 season Parnell was signed as an overseas player by Kent County Cricket Club on a six-week contract, serving as a replacement for Stuart Clark. On his county debut against Essex he took 4/78 in the first innings and top scored with 69 in the second, his maiden first-class fifty, going on to better this score in Kent's next County championship match, against Glamorgan with an innings of 90. Parnell left Kent to join up with South Africa ahead of the 2009 World Twenty20 but after the tournament he returned for a further five weeks. Though returning to South Africa after his second spell ended, Parnell was cleared by Cricket South Africa to return to Kent and played for the county on the competition's finals day.

In 2011 Parnell played for Sussex County Cricket Club for the second half of the season although "he struggled for fitness and form" during his spell with the county. In 2015 he played for Glamorgan in eight matches in the 2015 NatWest t20 Blast group stages before joining South Africa on their tour of Bangladesh. Parnell missed the first two matches of his planned ten with Glamorgan due to a groin injury.

Parnell joined Kent again in April 2017 for the first part of the 2017 season. He was available for the first weeks of the 2017 County Championship and 2017 Royal London One-Day Cup matches until South Africa began their tour of England in May.

In September 2018, Parnell signed a Kolpak deal with Worcestershire, making him unavailable to play international cricket. He was released by Worcestershire at the end of the 2020 season following the abolition of Kolpak status. He was picked up by Northamptonshire for the 2021 season as an overseas player and took ten wickets in his second match for the team against Yorkshire. In April 2021, he was named in Western Province's squad, ahead of the 2021–22 cricket season in South Africa.

== Franchise Twenty20 cricket ==
Parnell was bought the Delhi Daredevils in auction for the 2010 Indian Premier League (IPL), after they outbid the Deccan Chargers for his services. He was signed for a price that far exceeded his reserve price set at the start of the auction, becoming the third highest paid South African cricketer in the tournament but did not appear in any matches for Delhi during the season.

Parnell went on to play for Pune Warriors in the IPL from 2011 to 2013 before returning to Delhi to play for the Daredevils during the 2014 season. Whilst a Pune player he was one of 90 people detained by police after a rave party he was attending in a Mumbai suburb was raided in 2012. Parnell subsequently appeared in court and was bailed on drugs related charges. A further procedural court appearance took place whilst Parnell was in the South African squad for the 2014 World T20 competition which took place in Bangladesh. Parnell claimed he was innocent of any drug taking.

During the 2016 Caribbean Premier League Parnell played for Barbados Tridents. In June 2018, he was selected to play for Edmonton Royals in the players' draft for the inaugural edition of the Global T20 Canada tournament. He was the joint-leading wicket-taker in the tournament for the Edmonton Royals, with six dismissals in six matches.

In September 2018, Parnell was named in Kabul's squad in the first edition of the Afghanistan Premier League tournament. He was the leading wicket-taker for the team in the tournament, with 13 dismissals in ten matches.

In April 2023 Royal Challengers Bangalore signed Parnell as a replacement for Reece Topley in the 2023 Indian Premier League.

== International cricket ==
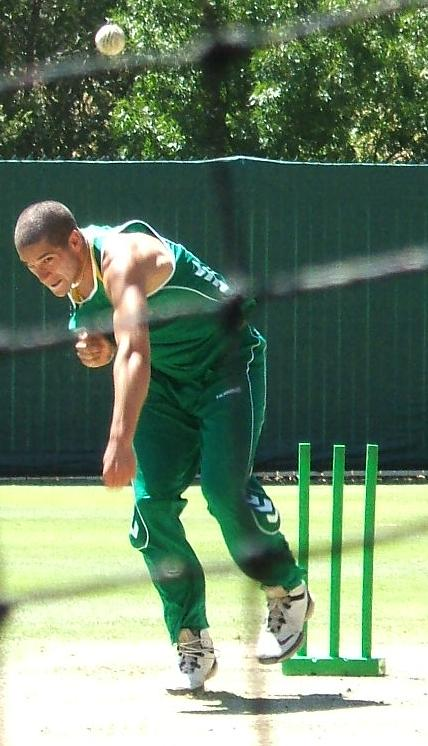
Parnell bowling in the Adelaide Oval nets, January 2009

Parnell was selected as captain of the South Africa team for the 2008 U/19 Cricket World Cup having also played for the team in 2006 U/19 Cricket World Cup. He finished the 2008 tournament as the leading wicket-taker with 18 wickets at 8.38. In the quarter-final against Bangladesh he took six for eight as well as top-scoring with 57.

Parnell was selected in the ODI and T20 squads for South Africa's tour of Australia in 2008–09, and made his international debut in the second Twenty20 International at Brisbane on 13 January 2009. He was expensive with the ball and put down a crucial catch, but it was later suggested that this was the result of a green laser light beamed into his eyes by a member of the crowd. He thus became the youngest player to be handed a national contract by Cricket South Africa (CSA).

Parnell was included in South Africa's squad for the third and final Test against Australia in Cape Town and although he was not part of the team was named in the squad for the Twenty20 and ODI series which followed. Sharing the new ball with Dale Steyn, he played a key role in South Africa's seven-wicket win in the second ODI at Centurion by taking four for 25.

In May 2009 Parnell was selected in the South African squad for the ICC World Twenty20 in England. He had an excellent tournament, taking nine wickets at 13.22 with an economy rate of less than six. Against the hosts he took figures of 3/14, which included an opening two overs for two runs and a wicket. In the following match against the West Indies he was named man-of-the-match after taking 4/13. His performances earned him a place in the World team of the tournament. Parnell won the golden ball for being the leading wicket taker in the 2009 ICC Champions Trophy with 11 wickets. He was named in the 'Team of the Tournament' by ESPNcricinfo for the 2009 T20I World Cup.

== Personal life ==
On 30 July 2011, Parnell announced that he had converted to Islam in January 2011 after a period of personal study. Parnell confirmed that his teammates Hashim Amla and Imran Tahir, along with team manager Mohammad Moosajee, had no influence over his decision. He considered taking the name Waleed, meaning 'Newborn Son', but continues to be known as Wayne.

Parnell has appeared in advertisements in support of PETA.
