= Carmi le Roux =

South African cricketer

Personal information
- Born: 30 March 1993 (age 33); Johannesburg, South Africa
- Batting: Right-handed
- Bowling: Left-arm fast-medium
- Role: Bowler

Domestic team information
- Years: Team
- 2014/15–2018/19: Gauteng
- 2015/16–2016/17: Lions
- 2018: Nelson Mandela Bay Giants
- 2022–present: Bay Blazers (squad no. 83)
- 2023–present: San Francisco Unicorns (squad no. 83)

Career statistics
Competition	FC	LA	Twenty20
Matches	2	29	26
Runs scored	9	92	65
Batting average	9.00	9.20	13.00
100s/50s	0/0	0/0	0/0
Top score	9	17	23
Balls bowled	319	1,450	482
Wickets	8	43	27
Bowling average	24.75	25.86	21.77
5 wickets in innings	0	1	0
10 wickets in match	0	0	0
Best bowling	2/46	5/28	4/23
Catches/stumpings	0/–	8/–	7/–
- Source: ESPNcricinfo, 13 June 2025

Carmi le Roux (born 30 March 1993) is a South African-American cricketer. He was included in Gauteng's squad for the 2016 Africa T20 Cup. In August 2017, he was named in Benoni Zalmi's squad for the first season of the T20 Global League. However, in October 2017, Cricket South Africa initially postponed the tournament until November 2018, with it being cancelled soon after. In 2023 he joined the new Major League Cricket league joining the San Francisco Unicorns.

He made his first-class debut for Gauteng in the 2017–18 Sunfoil 3-Day Cup on 12 October 2017. In September 2018, he was named in Gauteng's squad for the 2018 Africa T20 Cup. The following month, he was named in Nelson Mandela Bay Giants' squad for the first edition of the Mzansi Super League T20 tournament. In September 2019, he was named in Gauteng's squad for the 2019–20 CSA Provincial T20 Cup.

In June 2021, he was selected to take part in the Major League Cricket tournament in the United States following the players' draft.
