= Mohammad Mohsin (American cricketer) =

American cricketer

Personal information
- Born: 15 April 1996 (age 30); Mingora, Khyber Pakhtunkhwa, Pakistan
- Height: 6 ft 3 in (191 cm)
- Batting: Left-handed
- Bowling: Right-arm leg spin
- Role: All-rounder

International information
- National side: United States (2026–present)
- T20I debut (cap 51): 7 February 2026 v India
- Last T20I: 15 February 2026 v Namibia

Domestic team information
- Years: Team
- 2015–present: Peshawar
- 2020: Peshawar Zalmi (squad no. 9)
- 2023–present: Texas Super Kings
- 2024: Janakpur Bolts

Career statistics
Competition	T20I	FC	LA	T20
Matches	4	7	7	37
Runs scored	9	351	70	204
Batting average	4.50	31.90	17.50	12.00
100s/50s	0/0	1/1	0/1	0/0
Top score	8	140	53	35*
Balls bowled	72	335	170	662
Wickets	4	8	8	28
Bowling average	18.00	25.62	17.62	32.07
5 wickets in innings	0	0	0	0
10 wickets in match	0	0	0	0
Best bowling	2/19	3/34	4/30	4/13
Catches/stumpings	2/–	5/–	3/–	10/–
- Source: Cricinfo, 15 February 2026

Mohammad Mohsin (born 15 April 1996) is a cricketer who plays for the United States national cricket team and Texas Super Kings in the Major League Cricket.

== Early life and education ==
Born in Mingora, Khyber Pakhtunkhwa, Mohsin received his secondary education in Sargodha, Punjab, where his father was posted. Later, he attended the University of Engineering & Technology, Peshawar, where he completed a bachelor's degree in computer science.

== Domestic career ==
Mohsin made his first-class debut for Peshawar in the 2015–16 Quaid-e-Azam Trophy on 2 November 2015. He made his List A debut for Peshawar in the 2018–19 Quaid-e-Azam One Day Cup on 8 October 2018. He made his Twenty20 debut for Peshawar in the 2018–19 National T20 Cup on 11 December 2018. In November 2019, he was named in Pakistan's squad for the 2019 ACC Emerging Teams Asia Cup in Bangladesh.

In December 2019, he was drafted by the Pakistan Super League (PSL) franchise Peshawar Zalmi in the Silver category during the 2020 PSL draft. He made his debut for the team against Karachi Kings in the 2020 Pakistan Super League.

In January 2021, he was named in Khyber Pakhtunkhwa's squad for the 2020–21 Pakistan Cup.

== International career ==
In January 2026, Mohsin was named in USA's squad for the 2026 T20 World Cup.
