= Grand Prairie Stadium =

Sports stadium in Grand Prairie, Texas, US

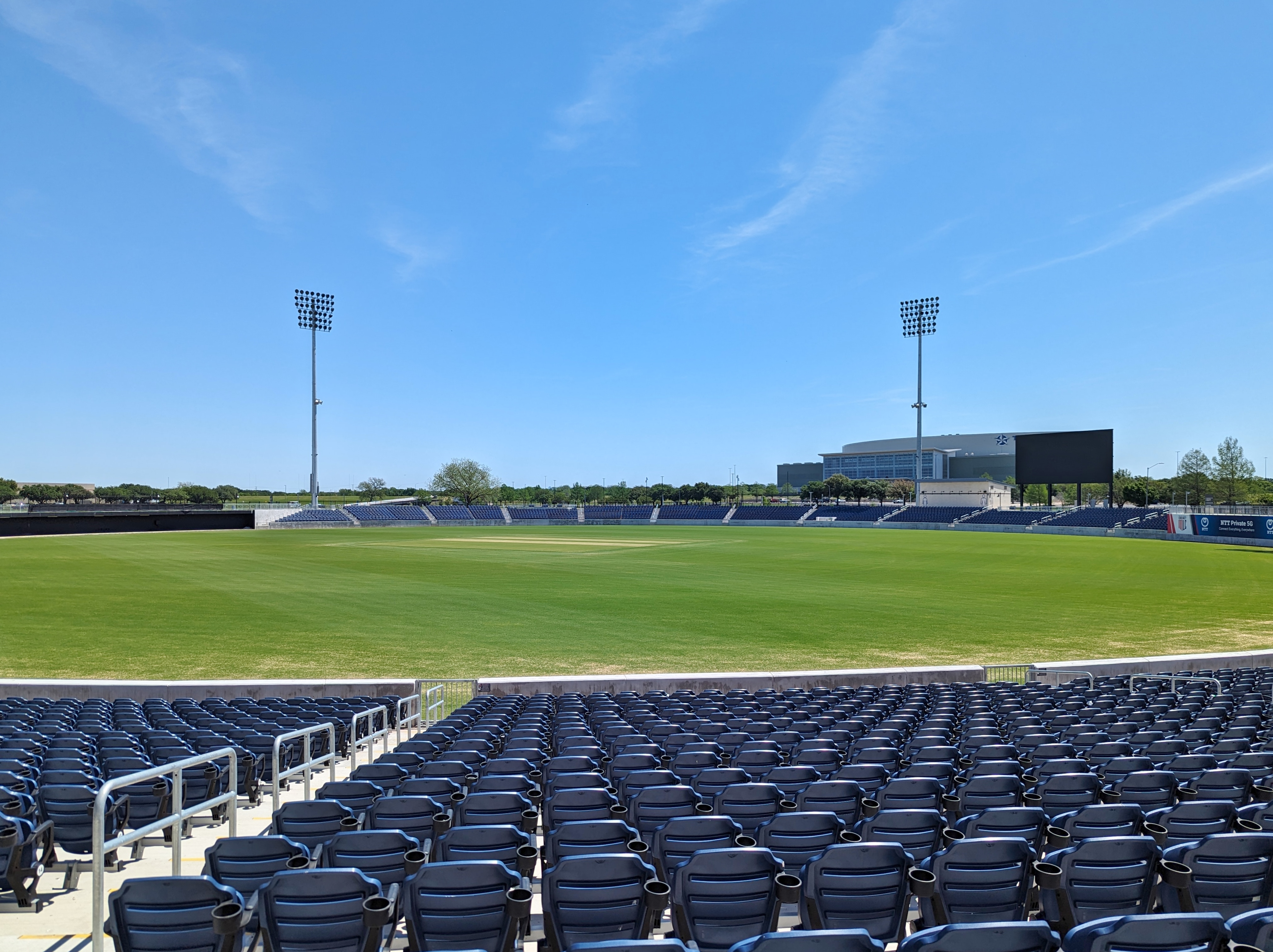
- Interactive map of Grand Prairie Stadium
- Former names: QuikTrip Park (2008–2014); AirHogs Stadium (2015–2019)
- Location: 1600 Lone Star Pkwy; Grand Prairie, Texas, United States
- Coordinates: 32°46′05″N 96°59′11″W
- Owner: City of Grand Prairie
- Operator: American Cricket Enterprises
- Capacity: 7,200 (expandable up to 15,000)
- Surface: Grass
- Field size: Left Field - 330 ft (100.58 m); Center Field - 397 ft (121.0 m); Right Field - 330 ft (100.58 m)

Construction
- Groundbreaking: 2007; 19 years ago
- Opened: 2008; 18 years ago
- Cost: $20 million
- Architect: HKS

Tenants
- Texas Super Kings (MLC) 2023–present Grand Prairie/Texas AirHogs (AA) 2008–2019; Dallas Desire (LFL) 2009; Texas United (USL2) 2017–2019

Ground information

International information
- First men's ODI: 25 October 2024: United States v Scotland
- Last men's ODI: 4 November 2024: Nepal v Scotland
- First men's T20I: 1 June 2024: United States v Canada
- Last men's T20I: 20 October 2024: United States v Nepal
- First women's ODI: 1 May 2025: United States v Zimbabwe
- Last women's ODI: 3 May 2025: United States v Zimbabwe
- First women's T20I: 25 April 2025: United States v Zimbabwe
- Last women's T20I: 29 April 2025: United States v Zimbabwe
- As of 3 May 2025; Source: Cricinfo

Grand Prairie Stadium (formerly QuikTrip Park and AirHogs Stadium) is a cricket ground and former ballpark in Grand Prairie, Texas. Opened in May 2008, it served as the home stadium of the Texas AirHogs of the American Association of Professional Baseball from 2008 through 2019, and of the USL League Two soccer team Texas United from 2017 to 2019.

After the AirHogs folded in October 2020, it was announced that American Cricket Enterprises—the commercial partner of USA Cricket—had acquired the lease to AirHogs Stadium, and planned to redevelop the ballpark as a cricket ground. The $20 million redevelopment began in April 2022, and the stadium reopened in July 2023 for the inaugural season of the Twenty20 league Major League Cricket—during which it hosted most matches.

The stadium also serves as a home and training facility for the United States national team, and was one of three U.S. host stadiums during the group stage of the 2024 ICC Men's T20 World Cup.

== History ==
The ballpark was constructed for the newly formed Texas AirHogs baseball team; Tulsa-based convenience store chain QuikTrip funded and acquired the naming rights to the stadium, considering it a part of the company's 50th anniversary.

In 2013, its natural grass surface was replaced with Matrix artificial turf.

By 2016, after the expiration of QuikTrip's naming rights, the park was later referred to as The Ballpark in Grand Prairie or AirHogs Stadium.

In 2017, the AirHogs' ownership group Neltex Sports Group established a new Premier Development League (PDL) soccer team, Texas United, which would play home matches at AirHogs Stadium.

In 2020, the Texas AirHogs opted out of the American Association season due to the COVID-19 pandemic in Texas, and then terminated their membership in the league in October of that year.

=== Conversion to a cricket stadium ===
On November 17, 2020, it was announced that American Cricket Enterprises had signed a long-term lease for the stadium, which would undergo redevelopment to convert it into a facility that can host domestic and international cricket matches, and a Dallas-area team for its upcoming Twenty20 cricket league Major League Cricket. USA Cricket, the US governing body, also announced that the facility would be used as a high-performance training center.

In May 2021, USA Cricket announced that Major League Cricket had been pushed back from 2022 to a 2023 launch due to a "lack of high-quality cricket stadiums" in the United States. It was also announced that the stadium renovations were set to begin the same month, and would last from mid-2022 to summer 2023. With the acquisition of the stadium, Texas United began playing most of their home matches on the campus of the University of Texas at Dallas beginning in the 2021 season.

The renovations include refurbishment and enhancement of the stadium's 13 luxury suites and Hall of Fame and Officer Club Rooms, installation of "premium seating experiences" around the field, and the renovation and reopening of the stadium's sports bar facility. Other cricket amenities such as training nets, batting lanes, and outside turf fields are planned to be added in "subsequent renovation phases". Dallas-based architect HKS was retained by ACE for this stadium, with the Manhattan Construction Company tapped to act as Construction Manager.

In March 2022, ACE stated that it expected to complete the project by March 2023, with the stadium being part of a $110 million investment into new and refurbished cricket-specific stadiums for MLC, and other ventures such as the 2024 ICC Men's T20 World Cup. Ground broke in April 2022, and construction started that July. The project has reportedly costed an excess of $20 million. The stadium was rededicated by the city on July 11, 2023, and it hosted most matches during the inaugural season of MLC that began on July 13.

Following the season, the stadium hosted local Minor League Cricket team, the Dallas Mustangs, for their 2023 campaign. It also hosted the finals of that season, where it saw the Mustangs emerge victorious over the New Jersey Somerset Cavaliers.

The stadium hosted matches during the group stage of the 2024 Men's T20 World Cup, including the opening match between the United States and Canada; temporary bleachers were installed to double the capacity of the stadium for the tournament. On June 6, 2024, in their second match at the stadium, the U.S. team notably upset Pakistan in a Super Over.

== 2024 ICC Men's T20 World Cup matches ==
1 June 2024
19:30 UTC−5 (N)
Scorecard

Canada; 194/5 (20 overs)	v	United States; 197/3 (17.4 overs)
Navneet Dhaliwal 61 (44); Harmeet Singh 1/27 (4 overs)		Aaron Jones 94* (40); Dillon Heyliger 1/19 (3 overs)

United States won by 7 wickets
Grand Prairie Stadium, Dallas, Texas
Umpires: Richard Illingworth (Eng) and Sharfuddoula (Ban)
Player of the match: Aaron Jones (USA)

- United States won the toss and elected to field.
- Both United States and Canada made their T20 World Cup debut.
- This was the first World Cup match victory for the United States across all formats.

4 June 2024
10:30 UTC−5
Scorecard

Nepal; 106 (19.2 overs)	v	Netherlands; 109/4 (18.4 overs)
Rohit Paudel 35 (37); Logan van Beek 3/18 (3.2 overs)		Max O'Dowd 54* (48); Dipendra Singh Airee 1/6 (2 overs)

Netherlands won by 6 wickets
Grand Prairie Stadium, Dallas, Texas
Umpires: Langton Rusere (Zim) and Rod Tucker (Aus)
Player of the match: Tim Pringle (Ned)

- Netherlands won the toss and elected to field.

6 June 2024
10:30 UTC−5
Scorecard

Pakistan; 159/7 (20 overs)	v	United States; 159/3 (20 overs)
Babar Azam 44 (43); Nosthush Kenjige 3/30 (4 overs)		Monank Patel 50 (38); Mohammad Amir 1/25 (4 overs)

Match tied (United States won the Super Over)
Grand Prairie Stadium, Dallas, Texas
Umpires: Michael Gough (Eng) and Allahudien Palekar (SA)

- United States won the toss and elected to field.
- Babar Azam (Pak) became the highest run-scorer in T20Is, surpassing Virat Kohli.
- Super Over: United States 18/1, Pakistan 13/1

7 June 2024
19:30 UTC−5 (N)
Scorecard

Sri Lanka; 124/9 (20 overs)	v	Bangladesh; 125/8 (19 overs)
Pathum Nissanka 47 (28); Mustafizur Rahman 3/17 (4 overs)		Towhid Hridoy 40 (20); Nuwan Thushara 4/18 (4 overs)

Bangladesh won by 2 wickets
Grand Prairie Stadium, Dallas, Texas
Umpires: Michael Gough (Eng) and Paul Reiffel (Aus)
Player of the match: Rishad Hossain (Ban)

- Bangladesh won the toss and elected to field.
- This was Bangladesh's first win against Sri Lanka in a T20 World Cup.

== List of centuries ==
=== Domestic T20 centuries ===
The following table summarises the domestic Twenty20 centuries scored at the site.

No.	Score	Player	Team	Balls	Opposing team	Date	Result
1	137*	Nicholas Pooran	MI New York	55	Seattle Orcas	July 30, 2023	Won
2	104	Tim Seifert	Seattle Orcas	66	Texas Super Kings	June 18, 2026	Lost
3	113*	Faf du Plessis	Texas Super Kings	52	Seattle Orcas	June 18, 2026	Won
4	155	Mitchell Owen	Washington Freedom	68	MI New York	June 20, 2026	Won
5	100	Kieron Pollard	MI New York	56	Washington Freedom	June 20, 2026	Lost

== Tenants ==
=== United States national cricket team ===
Grand Prairie Stadium became one of the five established US facilities for cricket, with it set to host the 2024 T20 World Cup in June and July.

=== Texas Super Kings ===
The stadium is currently the home stadium for the MLC team the Texas Super Kings.

=== Texas AirHogs ===
The park was built for the Texas AirHogs of the American Association in 2007. They began play (as the Grand Prairie AirHogs) in May 2008 and finished their inaugural season with a final record of 56–40, also winning the Southern Division title before falling to the Sioux Falls Canaries in the finals. A few years later, they would win the 2011 American Association championship by winning a decisive game five at QuikTrip Park. The AirHogs folded in October 2020.

The AirHogs hosted the American Association All-Star Game on July 21, 2009.

=== Dallas Desire ===
The Dallas Desire were one of two teams that were introduced to the women's Lingerie Football League (now Legends Football League) in 2004. They played two home games of their 2009 season in Grand Prairie. The team then moved to the Cotton Bowl for the 2010 season.

=== Texas United ===
In 2017, new Premier Development League (PDL) soccer team Texas United announced that they would play their inaugural season at Airhogs Stadium.

=== Southern Arkansas University Muleriders ===
The Mulerider baseball team used Airhog Stadium to host their Airhog DII Classic from 2015 to 2018. This event has featured several of the top teams in NCAA DII College Baseball.

=== Other ===
- NJCAA Region V Baseball Tournament: 2013
- WAC baseball tournament: 2013
- NCAA Division II College World Series: 2017

== Gallery ==
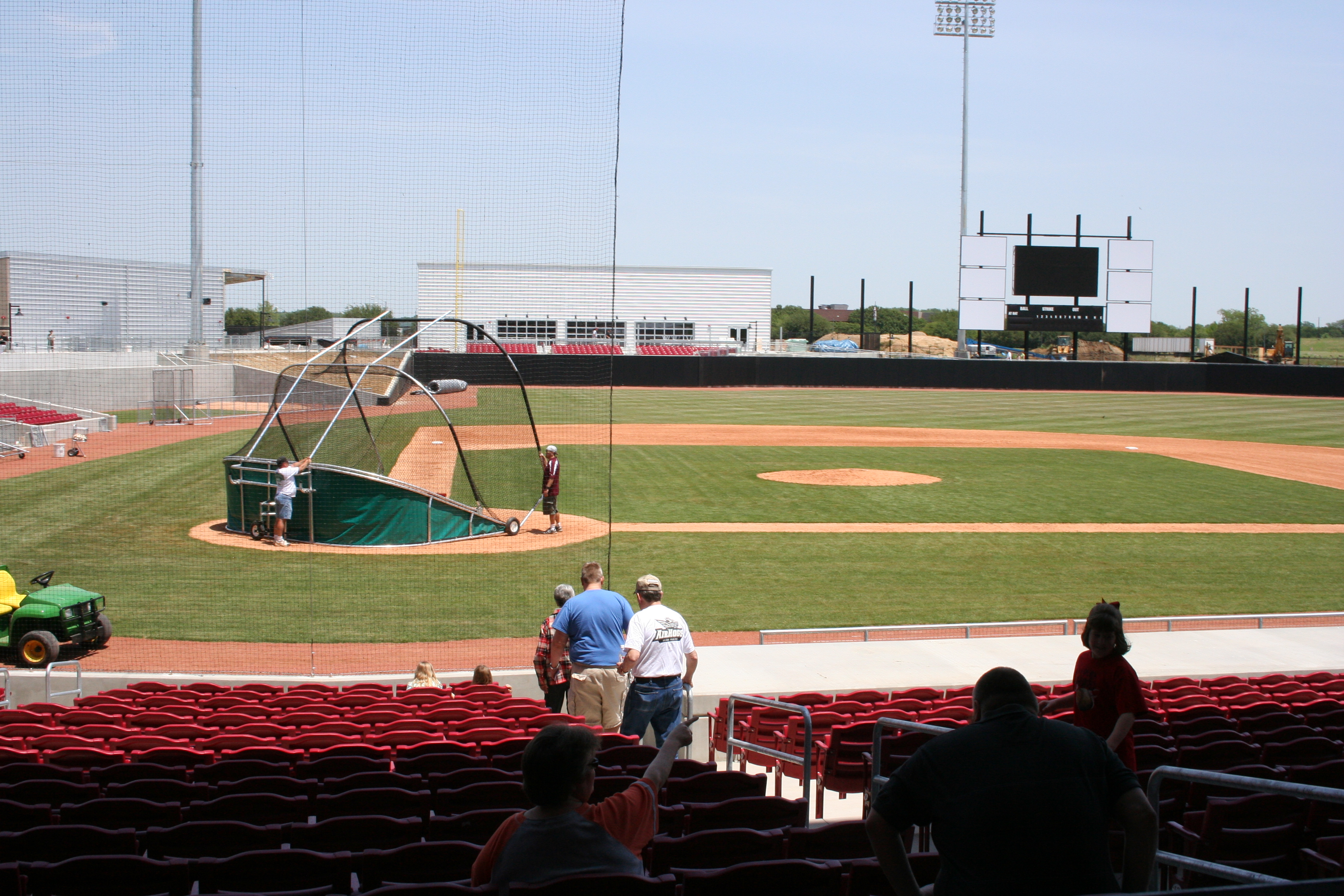
Picture of the first base side two weeks before opening day 2008

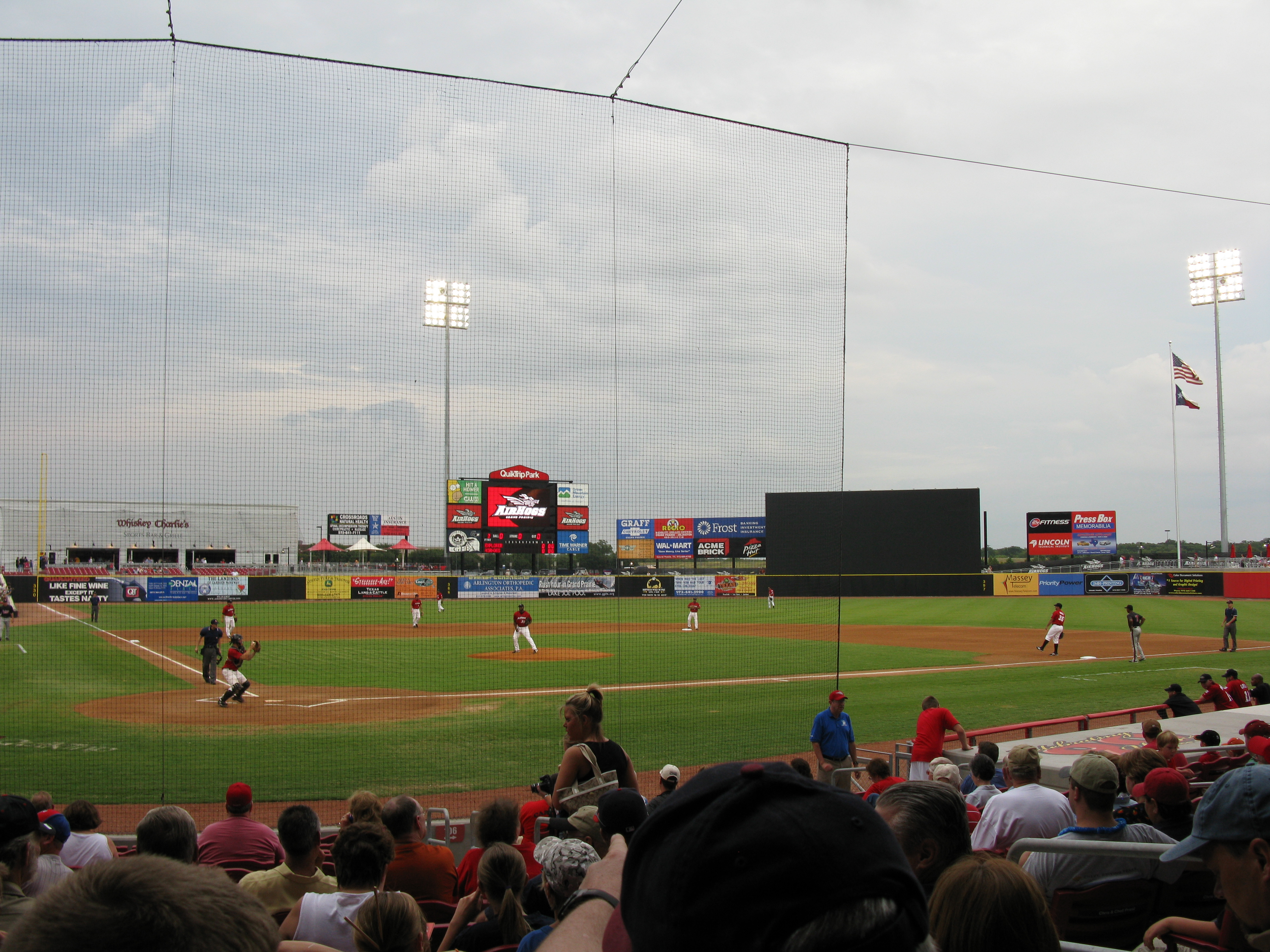
Picture of action during an AirHogs game on Aug 16, 2008

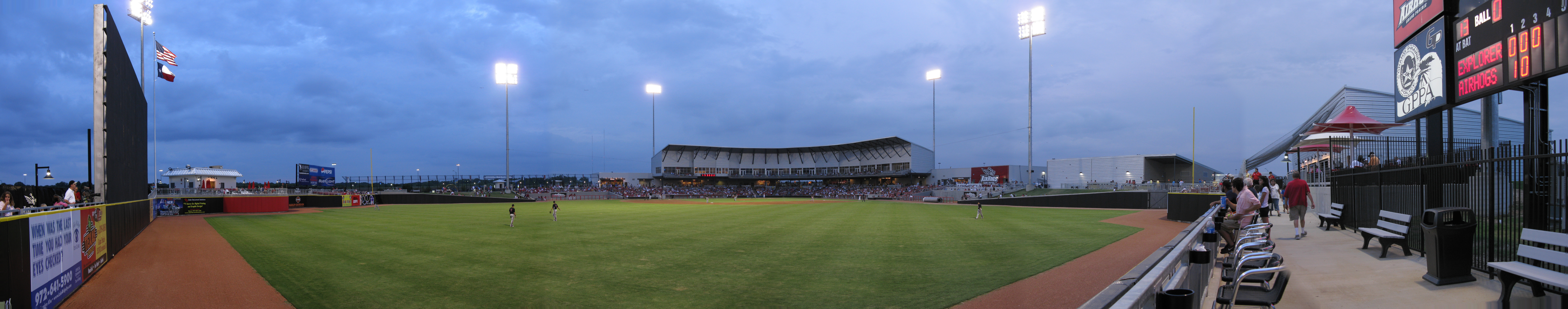
Panoramic picture taken from center field.

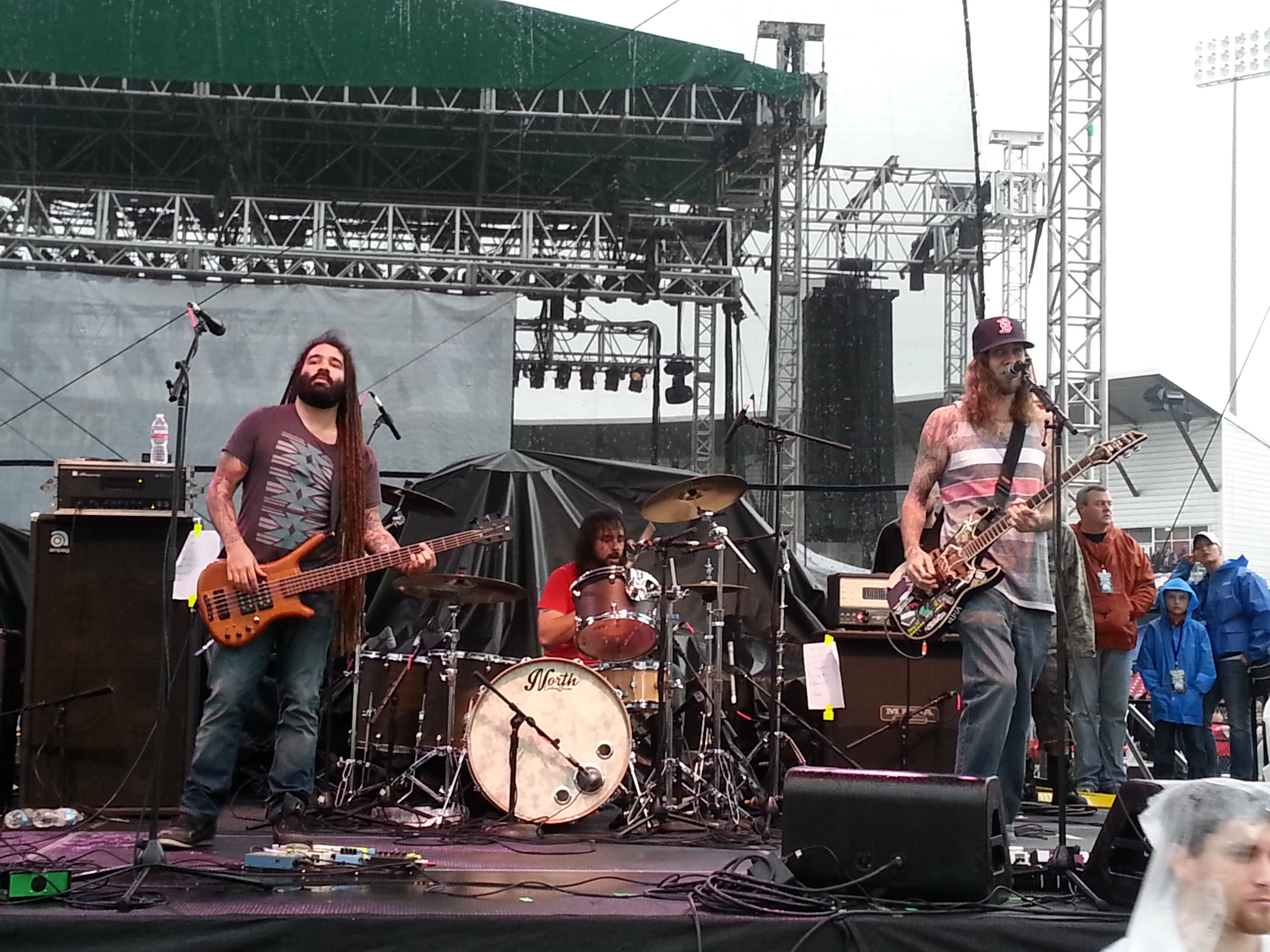
Smile Empty Soul performing at South by So What?! music festival in March 2014

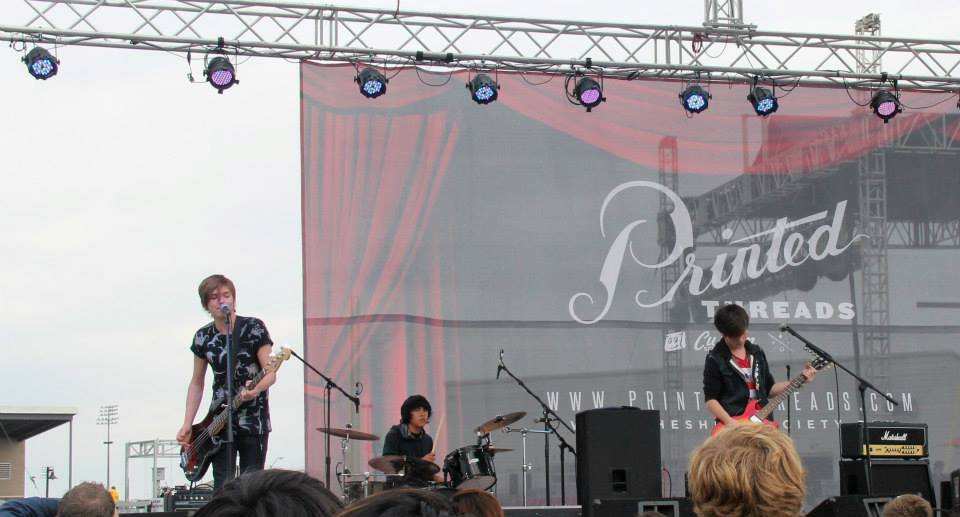
Dallas alternative rock ensemble One Soul performing at South by So What?! on October 26, 2013

Events and tenants
Preceded by Midway Stadium	Host of the AAB All-Star Game; QuikTrip Park; 2009	Succeeded by Lawrence-Dumont Stadium
