= Church Street Park =

Cricket ground

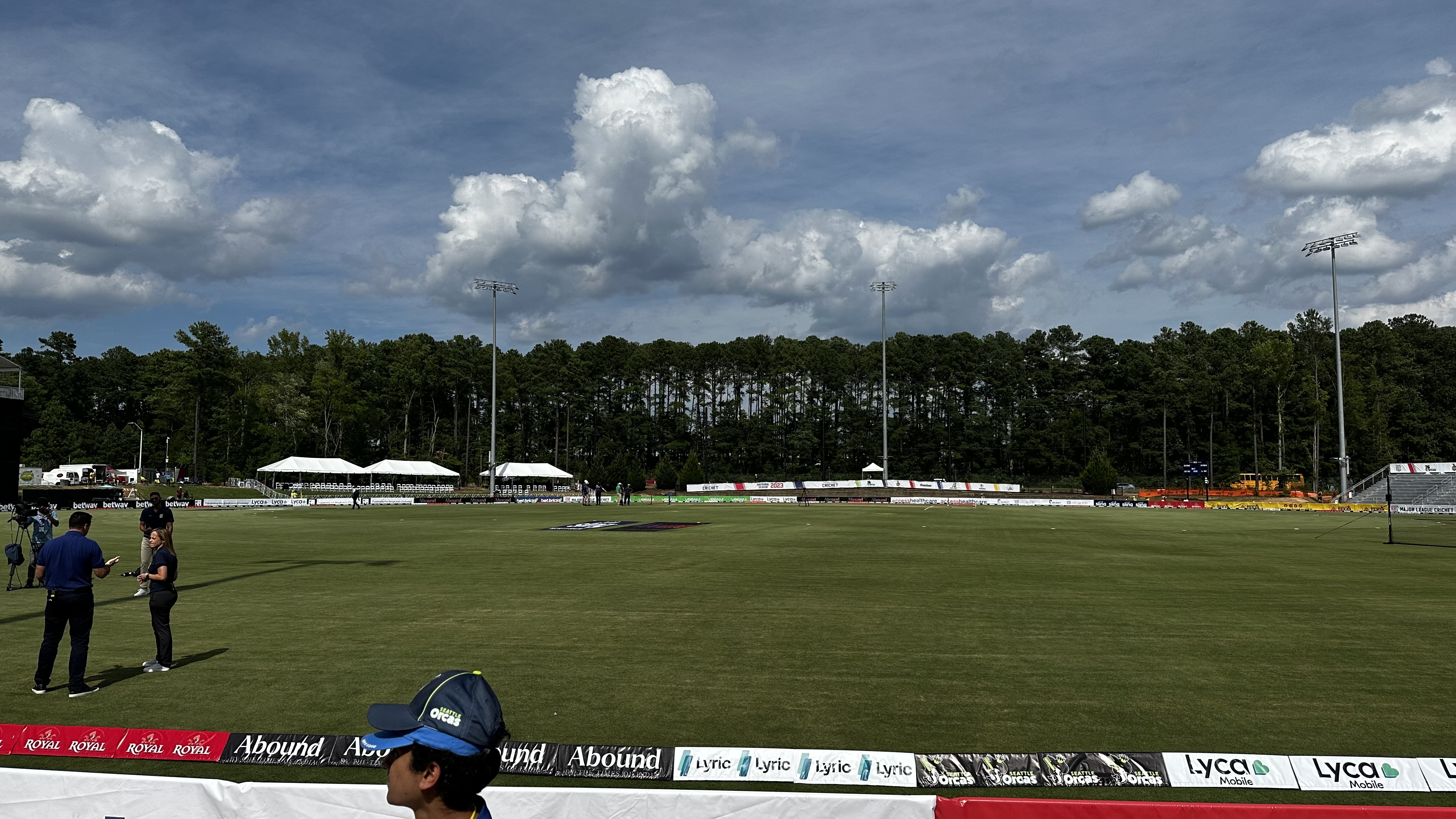

Ground information
- Location: Morrisville, North Carolina, United States
- Coordinates: 35°50′43.3″N 78°50′36.7″W
- Establishment: 2018; 7 years ago
- Capacity: 3,500
- Owner: Town of Morrisville
- End names
- Shiloh Grove North End; South End

Team information
United States national cricket team	(2024-present)
- As of May 10, 2019; Source: Cricinfo

Church Street Park is a cricket ground in Morrisville, North Carolina, United States. In September 2018, it hosted the matches in the Northern sub-region group of the 2018–19 ICC T20 World Cup Americas Qualifier tournament. In May 2019, the International Cricket Council (ICC) stated that the ground would host six One Day International (ODI) matches in the 2019 United States Tri-Nation Series. However, in July 2019, it was announced that either a new venue in Morgan Hill, California, or the Leo Magnus Cricket Complex in Woodley Park in Los Angeles would host the tournament.

In February 2022, Major League Cricket announced plans for Church Street Park to undergo a renovation as part of a public-private partnership with the town of Morrisville; the additions will include an expansion of permanent seating capacity to more than 3,500, increased parking, broadcast facilities, and LED-lit practice areas. These renovations come as part of a $110 million investment into eight renovated or newly constructed cricket facilities ahead of the launch of the domestic Twenty20 league in 2023, and the possibility of hosting matches during the 2024 ICC Men's T20 World Cup.

== See also ==
- List of cricket grounds in the United States
