= 2014 Washington Kastles season =

World TeamTennis champions

Eastern Conference champions
- Conference: 1st Eastern

Record
- 2014 record: 10 wins, 4 losses
- Home record: 6 wins, 1 loss
- Road record: 4 wins, 3 losses
- Games won–lost: 303–213

Team info
- Owner(s): Mark Ein
- General manager: Kevin Wynne
- Coach: Murphy Jensen
- Stadium: Kastles Stadium at the Charles E. Smith Center (capacity: 3,212)

The 2014 Washington Kastles season was the seventh season of the franchise in World TeamTennis (WTT).

The Kastles won their fourth consecutive King Trophy when they defeated the Springfield Lasers in the WTT Championship Match. The Kastles were led by Martina Hingis who was named WTT Final Most Valuable Player.

== Season recap ==
=== Drafts ===
With the Kastles winning the WTT championship in 2013, they had the last pick in each round of both WTT drafts. In the marquee player draft, the Kastles chose Martina Hingis and Venus Williams both of whom they had protected. The Kastles protected Leander Paes, Bobby Reynolds and Anastasia Rodionova from their 2013 squad in the roster draft. With Hingis committed to playing full-time, the Kastles knew they did not need all four of their picks in the roster draft. So, they traded their first round pick to the Springfield Lasers in exchange for the Lasers' third round pick and financial consideration. The Lasers used the pick they acquired from the Kastles to select Anna-Lena Grönefeld. The Kastles passed on the third round pick (20th overall) that they acquired in the trade with the Lasers.

=== New home venue ===
In May 2014, the Kastles announced they were moving to Kastles Stadium at the Charles E. Smith Center an indoor venue on the campus of George Washington University in the Foggy Bottom neighborhood of Washington, D.C. The stadium has a seating capacity of 3,212 for Kastles matches.

=== Other player transactions ===
On July 6, 2014, the Kastles announced the signings of Jarmila Gajdošová as a substitute player and Kevin Anderson as a wildcard player. On July 18, 2014, the Kastles signed Shelby Rogers as a substitute player. On July 22, the Kastles signed Sloane Stephens as a wildcard player.

Before the Eastern Conference Championship Match, Bobby Reynolds announced that he would retire from professional tennis at the end of the 2014 WTT season.

=== Season opener ===
On July 7, 2014, the Kastles opened their season with a dominant 24–16 overtime win on the road against the Boston Lobsters. The Kastles won the first four sets of the match led by Leander Paes and Bobby Reynolds (5–4 in men's doubles), Jarmila Gajdošová and Anastasia Rodionova (5–2 in women's doubles), Reynolds (5–3 in men's singles) and Rodionova (5–1 in women's singles) to build a 20–10 lead. After losing the fifth set of mixed doubles, Gajdošová and Paes won the second game of overtime to seal the match. The win was the Kastles' 13th straight victory going back to the 2013 season.

=== Home opener at new stadium ===
On July 9, 2014, in their first-ever match at the new Kastles Stadium at the Charles E. Smith Center, the Kastles hosted the Boston Lobsters and won all five sets to cruise to their 15th straight win by a score of 25–8. The Kastles got set wins from Martina Hingis and Leander Paes (5–1 in mixed doubles), Hingis (5–0 in women's singles), Kevin Anderson (5–1 in men's singles), Hingis and Anastasia Rodionova (5–2 in women's doubles) and Bobby Reynolds and Paes (5–4 in men's doubles). The victory improved the Kastles' record to 3 wins and 0 losses.

=== Dominant set-winning streak ===
On July 13, 2014, the Kastles' incredible 20-set winning streak came to an end when Leander Paes and Bobby Reynolds dropped the third set of men's doubles in the season's sixth match against the Philadelphia Freedoms. The streak began when Jarmila Gajdošová and Paes won the third set of the second match of the season. Even though they dropped a set, the Kastles got set wins Bobby Reynolds (5–1 in men's singles), Martina Hingis and Anastasia Rodionova (5–3 in women's doubles), Hingis (5–1 in women's singles) and Hingis and Paes (5–4 in mixed doubles) to earn a 23–14 victory, improve their record to 6 wins and 0 losses and extend their winning streak to 18 consecutive matches.

=== Winning streak snapped ===
On July 14, 2014, the Kastles saw their 18-match winning streak come to an end when the dropped four of five sets at home against the San Diego Aviators and fell by a score of 22–18.

=== Playoff berth ===
On July 18, 2014, despite losing their second straight match and third of the last four to fall to a record of 7 wins and 3 losses, the Kastles clinched their fourth consecutive playoff berth when the Philadelphia Freedoms defeated the Boston Lobsters, 25–14. The Kastles' 24–10 road loss to the Springfield Lasers was the worst defeat in franchise history.

=== Kastles clinch home-court advantage ===
On July 22, 2014, the Kastles won their third straight match and improved their record to 10 wins and 3 losses with a 23–15 victory over the Springfield Lasers to clinch home-court advantage for the Eastern Conference Championship Match. The Kastles got set wins from Sloane Stephens (5–2 in women's singles), Leander Paes and Bobby Reynolds (5–4 in men's doubles), Martina Hingis and Anastasia Rodionova (5—2 in women's doubles) and Hingis and Paes (5–2 in mixed doubles).

=== Eastern Conference Championship ===
On July 24, 2014, the Kastles won their fourth consecutive Eastern Conference Championship with a 21–16 overtime victory at home against the Philadelphia Freedoms. Bobby Reynolds got the Kastles started winning the first 10 point of the match on his way to a 5–3 set win in men's singles over Frank Dancevic. Taylor Townsend's 5–2 win over Martina Hingis in women's singles gave the Freedoms an 8–7 lead. Hingis bounced back in mixed doubles teaming with Leander Paes for a 5–2 set win over Liezel Huber and Marcelo Melo to put the Kastles back in front, 12–10. In a bizarre scene during the fourth set of women's doubles, Huber was struck in the back of the head by a Townsend forehand shot. Huber was unable to continue. She was diagnosed with a concussion, taken to the hospital and later released. With no substitute available, Townsend was left to finish the set alone. Playing two against one, Townsend was not permitted to return serves on Huber's side and dropped the set, 5–1, to give the Kastles a commanding 17–11 lead. Dancevic and Melo took the final set of men's doubles, 5–3, from Paes and Reynolds to cut the Kastles' lead to 20–16 and send the match to overtime. Paes and Reynolds won the first game of overtime to close out the match.

=== King Trophy ===
On July 27, 2014, the Kastles won their fourth consecutive King Trophy as World TeamTennis Champions with a dominant 25–13 victory over the Springfield Lasers in Springfield, Missouri. Although WTT predetermined that the Western Conference champion would host the WTT Final, the Kastles, as the higher seed, were treated as the "home" team in determining order of play. The Kastles won all five sets en route to the title, They were led by Martina Hingis who was named WTT Finals Most Valuable Player after earning a 5–2 win over Olga Govortsova in the second set of women's singles, teaming with Anastasia Rodionova for a 5–1 win over Govortsova and Līga Dekmeijere in the fourth set of women's doubles and closing out the match with Leander Paes with a 5–4 mixed doubles win over Govortsova and Ross Hutchins. Bobby Reynolds, playing the final professional tennis match of his career, got the Kastles started with a 5–4 men's singles win over Michael Russell in the first set before teaming with Paes for a 5–2 men's doubles win over Hutchins and Russell in the fourth set. The Kastles' fourth consecutive championship matched the WTT record set by the Sacramento Capitals who won four straight from 1997 to 2000.

== Event chronology ==
- February 11, 2014: The Kastles selected Martina Hingis and Venus Williams, both of whom they had protected, in the WTT Marquee Player Draft.
- March 11, 2014: The Kastles selected Leander Paes, Bobby Reynolds and Anastasia Rodionova, all of whom they had protected, in the WTT Roster Player Draft.
- July 6, 2014: The Kastles signed Jarmila Gajdošová as a substitute player and Kevin Anderson as a wildcard player.
- July 9, 2014: The Kastles played their first match at their new home venue, Kastles Stadium at the Charles E. Smith Center, and defeated the Boston Lobsters, 25–8.
- July 18, 2014: The Kastles signed Shelby Rogers as a substitute player.
- July 18, 2014: Despite suffering their worst loss in franchise history, a 24–10 road drubbing at the hands of the Springfield Lasers, the Kastles clinched their fourth consecutive playoff berth with a record of 7 wins and 3 losses when the Philadelphia Freedoms defeated the Boston Lobsters.
- July 22, 2014: The Kastles signed Sloane Stephens as a wildcard player.
- July 22, 2014: The Kastles won their third straight match and improved their record to 10 wins and 3 losses with a 23–15 victory over the Springfield Lasers to clinch home-court advantage for the Eastern Conference Championship Match.
- July 24, 2014: The Kastles defeated the Philadelphia Freedoms 21–16 in overtime to win their fourth consecutive Eastern Conference Championship.
- July 27, 2014: The Kastles defeated the Springfield Lasers 25–13 to win their fourth consecutive King Trophy as World TeamTennis Champions. Martina Hingis was named WTT Finals Most Valuable Player.

== Draft picks ==
Since the Kastles won the WTT Championship in 2013, they had the last selection in each round of both WTT drafts.

=== Marquee player draft ===
The Kastles protected both Martina Hingis and Venus Williams from their 2013 team. The selections made by the Kastles are shown in the table below.

Round	No.	Overall	Player chosen	Prot?
1	8	8	Martina Hingis	Y
2	8	16	Venus Williams	Y

Martina Hingis committed to playing full-time for the Kastles for the 2014 season.

=== Roster player draft ===
With Hingis committed to playing full-time, the Kastles knew they would not need all four of their draft choices. The Springfield Lasers had their eyes on an unprotected player and were willing to deal for the Kastles' top pick. The Kastles traded the seventh selection in the first round to the Lasers in exchange for the sixth selection in the third round (20th overall) and financial consideration. With the pick they acquired from the Kastles, the Lasers selected Anna-Lena Grönefeld. The selections made by the Kastles are shown in the table below.

Round	No.	Overall	Player chosen	Prot?
2	7	14	Leander Paes	Y
3	6	20	Pass	–
3	7	21	Bobby Reynolds	Y
4	7	28	Anastasia Rodionova	Y

== Match log ==
=== Regular season ===
Legend
Kastles Win	Kastles Loss
Home team in CAPS

Match	Date	Venue and location	Result and details	Record
1	July 7	Boston Lobsters Tennis Center at the Manchester Athletic Club; Manchester-by-the-Sea, Massachusetts	Washington Kastles 24, BOSTON LOBSTERS 16 (overtime) * MD: Leander Paes/Bobby Reynolds (Kastles) 5, Eric Butorac/Rik de Voest (Lobsters) 4 * WD: Jarmila Gajdošová/Anastasia Rodionova (Kastles) 5, Megan Moulton-Levy/Caitlin Whoriskey (Lobsters) 2 * MS: Bobby Reynolds (Kastles) 5, Rik de Voest (Lobsters) 3 * WS: Anastasia Rodionova (Kastles) 5, Caitlin Whoriskey (Lobsters) 1 * XD: Megan Moulton-Levy/Eric Butorac (Lobsters) 5, Jarmila Gajdošová/Leander Paes (Kastles) 3 * OT – XD: Jarmila Gajdošová/Leander Paes (Kastles) 1, Megan Moulon-Levy/Eric Butorac (Lobsters) 1	1–0
2	July 8	Four Seasons Resort and Club Dallas at Las Colinas; Irving, Texas	Washington Kastles 24, TEXAS WILD 15 * MS: Bobby Reynolds (Kastles) 5, Alex Bogomolov, Jr. (Wild) 2 * WS: Anabel Medina Garrigues (Wild) 5, Jarmila Gajdošová (Kastles) 4 * XD: Jarmila Gajdošová/Leander Paes (Kastles) 5, Anabel Medina Garrigues/Aisam Qureshi (Wild) 4 * WD: Jarmila Gajdošová/Anastasia Rodionova (Kastles) 5, Darija Jurak/Anabel Medina Garrigues (Wild) 1 * MD: Leander Paes/Bobby Reynolds (Kastles) 5, Alex Bogomolov, Jr./Aisam Qureshi (Wild) 3	2–0
3	July 9	Kastles Stadium at the Charles E. Smith Center; Washington, District of Columbia	WASHINGTON KASTLES 25, Boston Lobsters 8 * XD: Martina Hingis/Leander Paes (Kastles) 5, Megan Moulton-Levy/Eric Butorac (Lobsters) 1 * WS: Martina Hingis (Kastles) 5, Caitlin Whoriskey (Lobsters) 0 * MS: Kevin Anderson (Kastles) 5, Rik de Voest (Lobsters) 1 * WD: Martina Hingis/Anastasia Rodionova (Kastles) 5, Megan Moulton-Levy/Caitlin Whoriskey (Lobsters) 2 * MD: Bobby Reynolds/Leander Paes (Kastles) 5, Eric Butorac/Rik de Voest (Lobsters) 4; ***Bobby Reynolds substituted for Kevin Anderson at 0–1	3–0
4	July 10	Kastles Stadium at the Charles E. Smith Center; Washington, District of Columbia	WASHINGTON KASTLES 25, Philadelphia Freedoms 10 * MS: Kevin Anderson (Kastles) 5, Frank Dancevic (Freedoms) 2 * WD: Martina Hingis/Anastasia Rodionova (Kastles) 5, Liezel Huber/Taylor Townsend (Freedoms) 2 * MD: Leander Paes/Bobby Reynolds (Kastles) 5, Frank Dancevic/Marcelo Melo (Freedoms) 3 * WS: Martina Hingis (Kastles) 5, Taylor Townsend (Freedoms) 0 * XD: Martina Hingis/Leander Paes (Kastles) 5, Liezel Huber/Marcelo Melo (Freedoms) 3 *** Leander Paes substituted for Kevin Anderson at 1–0	4–0
5	July 11	Cedar Park Center; Cedar Park, Texas	Washington Kastles 25, AUSTIN ACES 10 * MS: Bobby Reynolds (Kastles) 5, Andy Roddick (Aces) 3 * MD: Leander Paes/Bobby Reynolds (Kastles) 5, Treat Huey/Andy Roddick (Aces) 4 * XD: Martina Hingis/Leander Paes (Kastles) 5, Vera Zvonareva/Treat Huey (Aces) 1 * WD: Martina Hingis/Anastasia Rodionova (Kastles) 5, Eva Hrdinova/Vera Zvonareva (Aces) 1 * WS: Martina Hingis (Kastles) 5, Vera Zvonareva (Aces) 1	5–0
6	July 13	Kastles Stadium at the Charles E. Smith Center; Washington, District of Columbia	WASHINGTON KASTLES 23, Philadelphia Freedoms 14 * MS: Bobby Reynolds (Kastles) 5, Frank Dancevic (Freedoms) 1 * WD: Martina Hingis/Anastasia Rodionova (Kastles) 5, Liezel Huber/Taylor Townsend (Freedoms) 3 * MD: Frank Dancevic/Marcelo Melo (Freedoms) 5, Leander Paes/Bobby Reynolds (Kastles) 3 * WS: Martina Hingis (Kastles) 5, Taylor Townsend (Freedoms) 1 * XD: Martina Hingis/Leander Paes (Kastles) 5, Liezel Huber/Marcelo Melo (Freedoms) 4	6–0
7	July 14	Kastles Stadium at the Charles E. Smith Center; Washington, District of Columbia	San Diego Aviators 22, WASHINGTON KASTLES 18 * MS: Somdev Devvarman (Aviators) 5, Bobby Reynolds (Kastles) 4 * WD: Daniela Hantuchová/Květa Peschke (Aviators) 5, Anastasia Rodionova/Martina Hingis (Kastles) 3 * XD: Martina Hingis/Leander Paes (Kastles) 5, Květa Peschke/Raven Klaasen (Aviators) 2 * WS: Daniela Hantuchová (Aviators) 5, Martina Hingis (Kastles) 2 * MD: Somdev Devvarman/Raven Klaasen (Aviators) 5, Bobby Reynolds/Leander Paes (Kastles) 4	6–1
8	July 16	Kastles Stadium at the Charles E. Smith Center; Washington, District of Columbia	WASHINGTON KASTLES 23, Texas Wild 18 * MS: Bobby Reynolds (Kastles) 5, Tim Smyczek (Wild) 4 * WD: Martina Hingis/Venus Williams (Kastles) 5, Anabel Medina Garrigues/Darija Jurak (Wild) 2 * XD: Anabel Medina Garrigues/Aisam Qureshi (Wild) 5, Martina Hingis/Leander Paes (Kastles) 4; ***Anabel Medina Garrigues substituted for Darija Jurak at 1–2 * WS: Anabel Medina Garrigues (Wild) 5, Venus Williams (Kastles) 4 * MD: Bobby Reynolds/Leander Paes (Kastles) 5, Aisam Qureshi/Tim Smyczek (Wild) 2	7–1
9	July 17	The Pavilion; Radnor Township, Pennsylvania	PHILADELPHIA FREEDOMS 22, Washington Kastles 15 (overtime) * XD: Liezel Huber/Marcelo Melo (Freedoms) 5, Venus Williams/Leander Paes (Kastles) 3 * WS: Taylor Townsend (Freedoms) 5, Anastasia Rodionova (Kastles) 0 *** Anastasia Rodionova substituted for Venus Williams at 0–3 * MS: Frank Dancevic (Freedoms) 5, Bobby Reynolds (Kastles) 2 * WD: Anastasia Rodionova/Venus Williams (Kastles) 5, Liezel Huber/Taylor Townsend (Freedoms) 3 * MD: Leander Paes/Bobby Reynolds (Kastles) 5, Frank Dancevic/Marcelo Melo (Freedoms) 3 * OT – MD: Frank Dancevic/Marcelo Melo (Freedoms) 1, Leander Paes/Bobby Reynolds (Kastles) 0	7–2
10	July 18	Mediacom Stadium at Cooper Tennis Complex; Springfield, Missouri	SPRINGFIELD LASERS 24, Washington Kastles 10 * MD: Ross Hutchins/Michael Russell (Lasers) 5, Leander Paes/Bobby Reynolds (Kastles) 2 * WD: Raquel Kops-Jones/Olga Govortsova (Lasers) 5, Anastasia Rodionova/Shelby Rogers (Kastles) 1 * XD: Olga Govortsova/Ross Hutchins (Lasers) 5, Anastasia Rodionova/Leander Paes (Kastles) 1 * WS: Anastasia Rodionova (Kastles) 5, Olga Govortsova (Lasers) 4; *MS: 'Michael Russell (Lasers) 5, Bobby Reynolds (Kastles) 1	7–3
11	July 19	Boston Lobsters Tennis Center at the Manchester Athletic Club; Manchester-by-the-Sea, Massachusetts	Washington Kastles 23, BOSTON LOBSTERS 9 * MS: Bobby Reynolds (Kastles) 5, Rik de Voest (Lobsters) 1 * WS: Anastasia Rodionova (Kastles) 5, Sharon Fichman (Lobsters) 1 * MD: Rik de Voest/Scott Lipsky (Lobsters) 5, Leander Paes/Bobby Reynolds (Kastles) 3 * WD: Anastasia Rodionova/Shelby Rogers (Kastles) 5, Sharon Fichman/Megan Moulton-Levy (Lobsters) 1 * XD: Anastasia Rodionova/Leander Paes (Kastles) 5, Sharon Fichman/Scott Lipsky (Lobsters) 1	8–3
12	July 21	Kastles Stadium at the Charles E. Smith Center; Washington, District of Columbia	WASHINGTON KASTLES 25, Boston Lobsters 9 * MS: Bobby Reynolds (Kastles) 5, Rik de Voest (Lobsters) 1 * WS: Martina Hingis (Kastles) 5, Megan Moulton-Levy (Lobsters) 4 * MD: Leander Paes/Bobby Reynolds (Kastles) 5, James Cerretani/Rik de Voest (Lobsters) 0 * WD: Martina Hingis/Anastasia Rodionova (Kastles) 5, Sharon Fichman/Megan Moulton-Levy (Lobsters) 0 (forfeit) *** Sharon Fichman suffered an injury to her left knee during pre-match warm-ups and was unable to play. With no female substitute player available, the Lobsters were forced to forfeit the women's doubles set. * XD: Martina Hingis/Leander Paes (Kastles) 5, Megan Moulton-Levy/James Cerretani (Lobsters) 4	9–3
13	July 22	Kastles Stadium at the Charles E. Smith Center; Washington, District of Columbia	WASHINGTON KASTLES 23, Springfield Lasers 15 * MS: Michael Russell (Lasers) 5, Bobby Reynolds (Kastles) 3 * WS: Sloane Stephens (Kastles) 5, Olga Govortsova (Lasers) 2 * MD: Leander Paes/Bobby Reynolds (Kastles) 5, Michael Russell/Fritz Wolmarans (Lasers) 4 * WD: Martina Hingis/Anastasia Rodionova (Kastles) 5, Olga Govortsova/Abigail Spears (Lasers) 2 * XD: Martina Hingis/Leander Paes (Kastles) 5, Abigail Spears/Fritz Wolmarans (Lasers) 2	10–3
14	July 23	The Pavilion; Radnor Township, Pennsylvania	PHILADELPHIA FREEDOMS 21, Washington Kastles 20 (super tiebreaker, 7–4) * MS:Bobby Reynolds (Kastles) 5, Frank Dancevic (Freedoms) 3 * WS: Martina Hingis (Kastles) 5, Taylor Townsend (Freedoms) 2 * MD: Frank Dancevic/Marcelo Melo (Freedoms) 5, Leander Paes/Bobby Reynolds (Kastles) 3 * WD: Martina Hingis/Anastasia Rodionova (Kastles) 5, Liezel Huber/Taylor Townsend (Freedoms) 3 * XD: Liezel Huber/Marcelo Melo (Freedoms) 5, Martina Hingis/Leander Paes (Kastles) 2 * OT – XD: Liezel Huber/Marcelo Melo (Freedoms) 2, Martina Hingis/Leander Paes (Kastles) 0 * STB – XD: Liezel Huber/Marcelo Melo (Freedoms) 7, Martina Hingis/Leander Paes (Kastles) 4	10–4

=== Playoffs ===
Legend
Kastles Win	Kastles Loss
Home team in CAPS

Eastern Conference Championship Match

Date	Venue and location	Result and details
July 24	Kastles Stadium at the Charles E. Smith Center; Washington, District of Columbia	WASHINGTON KASTLES 21, Philadelphia Freedoms 16 (overtime) * MS: Bobby Reynolds (Kastles) 5, Frank Dancevic (Freedoms) 3 * WS: Taylor Townsend (Freedoms) 5, Martina Hingis (Kastles) 2 * XD: Martina Hingis/Leander Paes (Kastles) 5, Liezel Huber/Marcelo Melo (Freedoms) 2 * WD: Martina Hingis/Anastasia Rodionova (Kastles) 5, Liezel Huber/Taylor Townsend (Freedoms) 1 * MD: Frank Dancevic/Marcelo Melo (Freedoms) 5, Leander Paes/Bobby Reynolds (Kastles) 3 * OT – MD: Leander Paes/Bobby Reynolds (Kastles) 1, Frank Dancevic/Marcelo Melo (Freedoms) 0

World TeamTennis Championship Match

Date	Venue and location	Result and details
July 27	Mediacom Stadium at Cooper Tennis Complex; Springfield, Missouri	WASHINGTON KASTLES (Note: Prior to the start of the season, WTT determined that the World TeamTennis Championship Match would be played on the home court of the Western Conference champion. The Kastles, as the higher seed, were treated as the "home" team under WTT rules for determining order of play.) 25, Springfield Lasers 13 * MS: Bobby Reynolds (Kastles) 5, Michael Russell (Lasers) 4 * WS: Martina Hingis (Kastles) 5, Olga Govortsova (Lasers) 2 * MD: Leander Paes/Bobby Reynolds (Kastles) 5, Michael Russell/Ross Hutchins (Lasers) 2 * WD: Martina Hingis/Anastasia Rodionova (Kastles) 5, Olga Govortsova/Līga Dekmeijere (Lasers) 1 * XD: Martina Hingis/Leander Paes (Kastles) 5, Olga Govortsova/Ross Hutchins (Lasers) 4

== Team personnel ==
=== On-court personnel ===
- (United States) Murphy Jensen, Coach
- (South Africa) Kevin Anderson
- (Australia) Jarmila Gajdošová (Note: Player appeared in fewer than three matches during the season as a substitute player and was not eligible to be protected in the following year's draft.)
- (Switzerland) Martina Hingis
- (India) Leander Paes
- (United States) Bobby Reynolds
- (Australia) Anastasia Rodionova
- (United States) Shelby Rogers
- (United States) Sloane Stephens
- (United States) Venus Williams

=== Front office ===
- Mark Ein, Owner
- Kevin Wynne, General Manager

== Statistics ==
Players are listed in order of their game-winning percentage provided they played in at least 40% of the Kastles' games in that event, which is the WTT minimum for qualification for league leaders in individual statistical categories.

Men's singles – regular season

Player	GP	GW	GL	PCT	A	DF	BPW	BPP	BP%	3APW	3APP	3AP%
Bobby Reynolds	88	50	38	.568	16	10	19	37	.514	12	24	.500
Kevin Anderson	13	10	3	.769	8	4	4	8	.500	4	5	.800
Total	101	60	41	.594	24	14	23	45	.511	16	29	.552

Women's singles – regular season

Player	GP	GW	GL	PCT	A	DF	BPW	BPP	BP%	3APW	3APP	3AP%
Martina Hingis	45	32	13	.711	5	2	12	23	.522	5	10	.500
Sloane Stephens	7	5	2	.714	2	2	2	8	.250	3	5	.600
Anastasia Rodionova	23	15	8	.652	3	3	4	9	.444	5	7	.714
Jarmila Gajdošová	9	4	5	.444	3	3	0	1	.000	0	1	.000
Venus Williams	12	4	8	.333	0	4	2	4	.500	1	1	1.000
Total	96	60	36	.625	13	14	20	45	.444	14	24	.583

Men's doubles – regular season

Player	GP	GW	GL	PCT	A	DF	BPW	BPP	BP%	3APW	3APP	3AP%
Leander Paes	113	60	53	.531	2	5	11	29	.379	15	30	.500
Bobby Reynolds	112	59	53	.527	10	4	11	29	.379	14	29	.483
Kevin Anderson	1	1	0	1.000	1	1	0	0	–	1	1	1.000
Total	113	60	53	.531	13	10	11	29	.379	15	30	.500

Women's doubles – regular season

Player	GP	GW	GL	PCT	A	DF	BPW	BPP	BP%	3APW	3APP	3AP%
Martina Hingis	63	43	20	.683	1	7	16	26	.615	13	19	.684
Anastasia Rodionova	87	58	29	.667	7	8	21	32	.656	15	23	.652
Jarmila Gajdošová	13	10	3	.769	0	0	3	4	.750	3	4	.750
Venus Williams	15	10	5	.667	1	0	4	8	.500	2	3	.667
Shelby Rogers	12	6	6	.500	1	3	3	5	.600	0	3	.000
Sloane Stephens	2	1	1	.500	1	1	1	3	.333	1	2	.500
Total	96	64	32	.667	11	19	24	39	.615	17	27	.630

Mixed doubles – regular season

Player	GP	GW	GL	PCT	A	DF	BPW	BPP	BP%	3APW	3APP	3AP%
Martina Hingis	71	41	30	.577	4	4	13	27	.481	11	20	.550
Leander Paes	109	58	51	.532	7	6	19	45	.422	15	30	.500
Kevin Anderson	1	1	0	1.000	3	0	0	0	–	0	0	–
Anastasia Rodionova	12	6	6	.500	0	1	3	8	.375	2	4	.500
Jarmila Gajdošová	19	9	10	.474	0	2	2	6	.333	2	5	.400
Venus Williams	8	3	5	.375	0	0	1	4	.250	0	1	.000
Total	110	59	51	.536	14	13	19	45	.422	15	30	.500

Team totals – regular season

Event	GP	GW	GL	PCT	A	DF	BPW	BPP	BP%	3APW	3APP	3AP%
Men's singles	101	60	41	.594	24	14	23	45	.511	16	29	.552
Women's singles	96	60	36	.625	13	14	20	45	.444	14	24	.583
Men's doubles	113	60	53	.531	13	10	11	29	.379	15	30	.500
Women's doubles	96	64	32	.667	11	19	24	39	.615	17	27	.630
Mixed doubles	110	59	51	.536	14	13	19	45	.422	15	30	.500
Total	516	303	213	.587	75	70	97	203	.478	77	140	.550

Men's singles – playoffs

Player	GP	GW	GL	PCT	A	DF	BPW	BPP	BP%	3APW	3APP	3AP%
Bobby Reynolds	17	10	7	.588	2	1	3	5	.600	2	4	.500
Total	17	10	7	.588	2	1	3	5	.600	2	4	.500

Women's singles – playoffs

Player	GP	GW	GL	PCT	A	DF	BPW	BPP	BP%	3APW	3APP	3AP%
Martina Hingis	14	7	7	.500	3	2	3	10	.300	4	8	.500
Total	14	7	7	.500	3	2	3	10	.300	4	8	.500

Men's doubles – playoffs

Player	GP	GW	GL	PCT	A	DF	BPW	BPP	BP%	3APW	3APP	3AP%
Leander Paes	16	9	7	.563	1	0	1	5	.200	1	2	.500
Bobby Reynolds	16	9	7	.563	2	0	1	5	.200	1	2	.500
Total	16	9	7	.563	3	0	1	5	.200	1	2	.500

Women's doubles – playoffs

Player	GP	GW	GL	PCT	A	DF	BPW	BPP	BP%	3APW	3APP	3AP%
Martina Hingis	12	10	2	.833	2	0	4	6	.667	1	1	1.000
Anastasia Rodionova	12	10	2	.833	3	2	4	6	.667	1	1	1.000
Total	12	10	2	.833	5	2	4	6	.667	1	1	1.000

Mixed doubles – playoffs

Player	GP	GW	GL	PCT	A	DF	BPW	BPP	BP%	3APW	3APP	3AP%
Martina Hingis	16	10	6	.625	0	0	2	4	.500	3	4	.750
Leander Paes	16	10	6	.625	1	2	2	4	.500	3	4	.750
Total	16	10	6	.625	1	2	2	4	.500	3	4	.750

Team totals – playoffs

Event	GP	GW	GL	PCT	A	DF	BPW	BPP	BP%	3APW	3APP	3AP%
Men's singles	17	10	7	.588	2	1	3	5	.600	2	4	.500
Women's singles	14	7	7	.500	3	2	3	10	.300	4	8	.500
Men's doubles	16	9	7	.563	3	0	1	5	.200	1	2	.500
Women's doubles	12	10	2	.833	5	2	4	6	.667	1	1	1.000
Mixed doubles	16	10	6	.625	1	2	2	4	.500	3	4	.750
Total	75	46	29	.613	14	7	13	30	.433	11	19	.579

Men's singles – all matches

Player	GP	GW	GL	PCT	A	DF	BPW	BPP	BP%	3APW	3APP	3AP%
Bobby Reynolds	105	60	45	.571	18	11	22	42	.524	14	28	.500
Kevin Anderson	13	10	3	.769	8	4	4	8	.500	4	5	.800
Total	118	70	48	.593	26	15	26	50	.520	18	33	.545

Women's singles – all matches

Player	GP	GW	GL	PCT	A	DF	BPW	BPP	BP%	3APW	3APP	3AP%
Martina Hingis	59	39	20	.661	8	4	15	33	.455	9	18	.500
Sloane Stephens	7	5	2	.714	2	2	2	8	.250	3	5	.600
Anastasia Rodionova	23	15	8	.652	3	3	4	9	.444	5	7	.714
Jarmila Gajdošová	9	4	5	.444	3	3	0	1	.000	0	1	.000
Venus Williams	12	4	8	.333	0	4	2	4	.500	1	1	1.000
Total	110	67	43	.609	16	16	23	55	.418	18	32	.563

Men's doubles – all matches

Player	GP	GW	GL	PCT	A	DF	BPW	BPP	BP%	3APW	3APP	3AP%
Leander Paes	129	69	60	.535	3	5	12	34	.353	16	32	.500
Bobby Reynolds	128	68	60	.531	12	4	12	34	.353	15	31	.484
Kevin Anderson	1	1	0	1.000	1	1	0	0	–	1	1	1.000
Total	129	69	60	.535	16	10	12	34	.353	16	32	.500

Women's doubles – all matches

Player	GP	GW	GL	PCT	A	DF	BPW	BPP	BP%	3APW	3APP	3AP%
Martina Hingis	75	53	22	.707	3	7	20	32	.625	14	20	.700
Anastasia Rodionova	99	68	31	.687	10	10	25	38	.658	16	24	.667
Jarmila Gajdošová	13	10	3	.769	0	0	3	4	.750	3	4	.750
Venus Williams	15	10	5	.667	1	0	4	8	.500	2	3	.667
Shelby Rogers	12	6	6	.500	1	3	3	5	.600	0	3	.000
Sloane Stephens	2	1	1	.500	1	1	1	3	.333	1	2	.500
Total	108	74	34	.685	16	21	28	45	.622	18	28	.643

Mixed doubles – all matches

Player	GP	GW	GL	PCT	A	DF	BPW	BPP	BP%	3APW	3APP	3AP%
Martina Hingis	87	51	36	.586	4	4	15	31	.484	14	24	.583
Leander Paes	125	68	57	.544	8	8	21	49	.429	18	34	.529
Kevin Anderson	1	1	0	1.000	3	0	0	0	–	0	0	–
Anastasia Rodionova	12	6	6	.500	0	1	3	8	.375	2	4	.500
Jarmila Gajdošová	19	9	10	.474	0	2	2	6	.333	2	5	.400
Venus Williams	8	3	5	.375	0	0	1	4	.250	0	1	.000
Total	126	69	57	.548	15	15	21	49	.429	18	34	.529

Team totals – all matches

Event	GP	GW	GL	PCT	A	DF	BPW	BPP	BP%	3APW	3APP	3AP%
Men's singles	118	70	48	.593	26	15	26	50	.520	18	33	.545
Women's singles	110	67	43	.609	16	16	23	55	.418	18	32	.563
Men's doubles	129	69	60	.535	16	10	12	34	.353	16	32	.500
Women's doubles	108	74	34	.685	16	21	28	45	.622	18	28	.643
Mixed doubles	126	69	57	.548	15	15	21	49	.429	18	34	.529
Total	591	349	242	.591	89	77	110	233	.472	88	159	.553

== Transactions ==
- March 11, 2014: The Kastles traded the seventh pick of the first round of the WTT roster draft to the Springfield Lasers in exchange for the sixth pick in the third round (number 20 overall) and financial consideration. The Lasers used the selection they acquired in the trade to draft Anna-Lena Grönefeld. The Kastles passed on using the selection they acquired in the trade.
- July 6, 2014: The Kastles signed Jarmila Gajdošová as a substitute player and Kevin Anderson as a wildcard player.
- July 18, 2014: The Kastles signed Shelby Rogers as a substitute player.
- July 22, 2014: The Kastles signed Sloane Stephens as a wildcard player.

== Individual honors and achievements ==
Martina Hingis was named WTT Final Most Valuable Player.

Hingis led WTT in winning percentage in both women's singles and doubles and was third in mixed doubles during the regular season.

Anastasia Rodionova was second (behind Hingis) in winning percentage in women's doubles during the regular season.

Leander Paes was fourth in winning percentage in men's doubles and sixth in mixed doubles during the regular season.

Bobby Reynolds was fifth in winning percentage in men's doubles during the regular season.

== Charitable support ==
During each night of the 2014 season, the WTT team with the most aces received US$1,000 toward a local charity of the team's choice as part of a program called Mylan Aces. In the case of a tie, the award was split accordingly. The Kastles earned $4,500 for the Boys & Girls Club of Greater Washington - Clubhouse #2 through the program.

== See also ==
- 2014 World TeamTennis season
- Sports in Washington, D.C.
