= Washington football =

Washington football most often refers to:

- Washington Commanders, an American football team member of the National Football League based in the Washington, D.C. metropolitan area (formerly named the Washington Redskins and Washington Football Team)
- Washington Huskies football, a college football team based in the US state of Washington

Washington football may also refer to:

- Washington Commandos, a former indoor American football team and founding member of the Arena Football League based in Washington, D.C.
- Washington Valor, a former indoor American football team of the Arena Football League based in Washington, D.C.
- Washington F.C., an association football team based in Washington, Tyne and Wear, England
- Washington Spirit, a women's association football team based in Washington, D.C.
- Washington State Cougars football, a college football team based in the US state of Washington
- Washington University Bears football, a college football team based in the US state of Missouri
- Washington College Shoremen football, a former college football team based in the US state of Maryland
- D.C. United, an association football team member of Major League Soccer based in Washington, D.C.
- DC Defenders, an American football team member of the UFL based in Washington, D.C.

== See also ==
- Sports in Washington (state)
- Sports in Washington, D.C.
