= Michael Rees =

Michael Rees may refer to:

- Michael Rees (artist)
- Michael Rees (businessman)

== See also ==
- Michael Reese (disambiguation)
