= Sports in Washington, D.C. =

Nationals Park, home of the Washington Nationals (MLB)

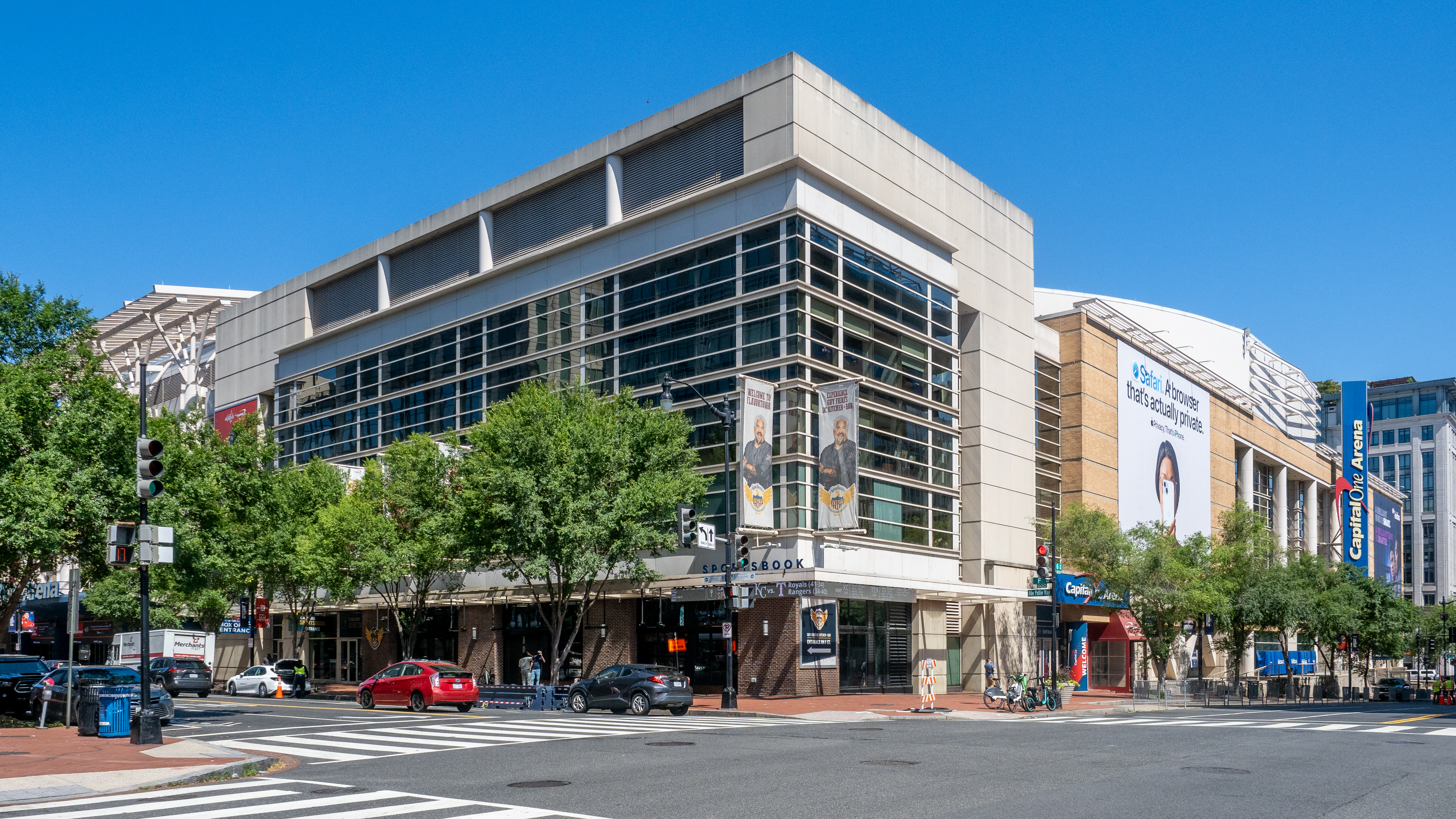
Capital One Arena, home of the Washington Wizards (NBA), Washington Capitals (NHL), and the Georgetown Hoyas men's basketball team (NCAA)

Washington, D.C., the capital city of the United States, is home to several professional and amateur sports teams. The city is one of eleven in the US to host teams from all five major professional sports leagues in the United States and Canada.

This includes the Washington Nationals of Major League Baseball (MLB), the Washington Wizards of the National Basketball Association (NBA), the Washington Commanders of the National Football League (NFL), the Washington Capitals of the National Hockey League (NHL), and D.C. United of Major League Soccer (MLS). In women's major sports leagues, the city hosts the Washington Mystics of the Women's National Basketball Association (WNBA) and the Washington Spirit of the National Women's Soccer League (NWSL).

Additionally, Washington, D.C. is home to four universities which compete in the National Collegiate Athletic Association's (NCAA) Division I. This includes the Georgetown Hoyas, Howard Bison, George Washington Revolutionaries, and the American Eagles.

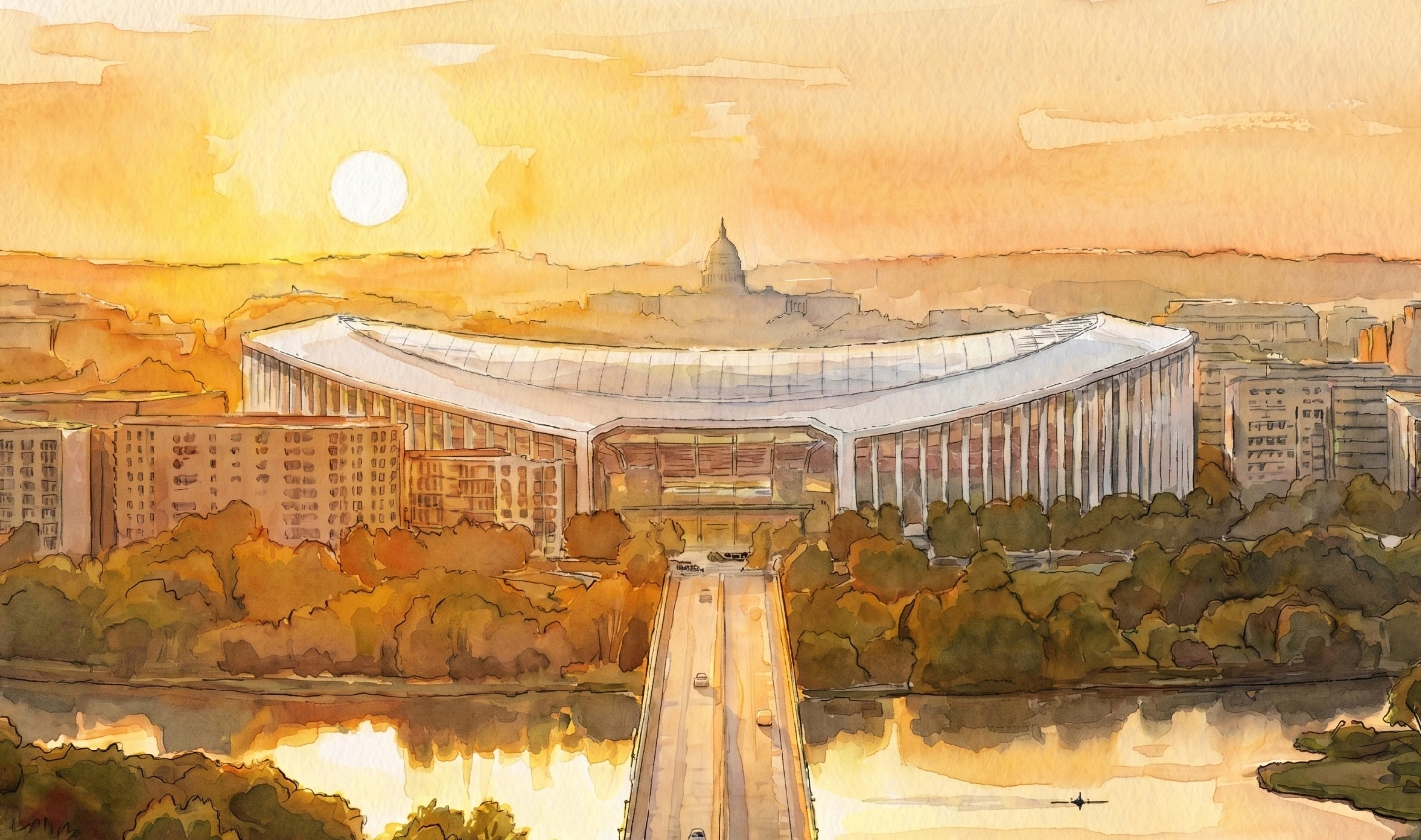
A rendering of "New Stadium at RFK Campus", future home of the Washington Commanders (NFL)

The Commanders were among the most successful professional sports teams in North America throughout the 1980s and early 1990s, making four Super Bowl appearances and winning three in a ten-year period ending in 1992. The sports of this region would then fall into a period of irrelevance; after the Capitals reached the 1998 Stanley Cup Final, none of the "Big Four" teams in the area would reach its league's semifinal round for several years. The Commanders and Wizards often struggled in their respective regular seasons, while the Capitals and Nationals were known for having spectacular regular seasons followed by demoralizing playoff losses. However, D.C. United would win several league championships during the late 1990s and early 2000s, including the inaugural season of the league in 1996. In 2018, the Big Four drought was broken when the Capitals defeated the Vegas Golden Knights in the 2018 Stanley Cup Final. The following year, the Nationals defeated the Houston Astros in the 2019 World Series. Outside of the Big Four, the Mystics defeated the Connecticut Sun in the 2019 WNBA Finals, and the Spirit won their first NWSL championship when they defeated the Chicago Red Stars in 2021.

Major sports venues in Washington, D.C. include Nationals Park, Capital One Arena, and Audi Field. In 2030, "New Stadium at RFK Campus" is expected to open on the site of the former RFK Stadium.

== Professional sports ==
The following table shows the major league sports teams in the Washington area sorted by attendance.

| Club | Sport | League | Founded | Venue | Attendance | Major honors |
|---|---|---|---|---|---|---|
| Washington Nationals | Baseball | MLB | 2005 (Note: Year team moved to Washington area) | Nationals Park | 24,287 | World Series champions: 2019 |
| Washington Wizards | Men's basketball | NBA | 1973 | Capital One Arena | 16,898 | NBA champions: 1978 |
| Washington Commanders | American football | NFL | 1937 | Northwest Stadium | 63,950 | Pre-1966 NFL champions: 1937, 1942; Super Bowl champions: 1982, 1987, 1991 |
| Washington Capitals | Ice hockey | NHL | 1974 | Capital One Arena | 18,573 | Stanley Cup champions: 2018; Presidents' Trophy: 2010, 2016, 2017 |
| D.C. United | Men's soccer | MLS | 1996 | Audi Field | 16,256 | MLS Cup champions: 1996, 1997, 1999, 2004; Supporters' Shield: 1997, 1999, 2006, 2007; CONCACAF Champions Cup: 1998 (Note: Other D.C. United honors include the Copa Interamericana: 1998; and Lamar Hunt U.S. Open Cup: 1996, 2008, 2013.) |
| DC Defenders | American football | UFL | 2018 | Audi Field | 14,269 | UFL champions: 2025 |
| Washington Spirit | Women's soccer | NWSL | 2011 (Note: Founded as D.C. United Women; rebranded as Washington Spirit in 2012 and started NWSL play in 2013.) | Audi Field | 10,876 | NWSL champions: 2021 |
| Washington Mystics | Women's basketball | WNBA | 1998 | CareFirst Arena | 3,983 | WNBA champions: 2019 |
| Capital City Go-Go | Men's basketball | NBA G League | 2018 | CareFirst Arena | 1,076 | None |
| Old Glory DC | Rugby union | Major League Rugby | 2018 | George Mason Stadium | N/A | None |
| DC Breeze | Ultimate | Ultimate Frisbee Association | 2013 | Carlini Field | Unknown | None |
| Washington Freedom | Cricket | MLC | 2023 | Revolving | N/A | MLC Champions: 2024 |
| DC Flight | Women's volleyball | Major League Volleyball | 2026 | The Anthem | N/A | None |

=== Map of major league teams and sports stadiums in Washington, D.C. ===
Current location of major league teams in Washington, D.C. (the Commanders play in Landover, Maryland and the Old Glory plays in Fairfax, Virginia
Location of current (green dot), former (red dot), and future (blue dot) professional sports stadiums in Washington, D.C. Note that the new Commanders stadium will be on the same location as RFK Stadium, which has since been demolished

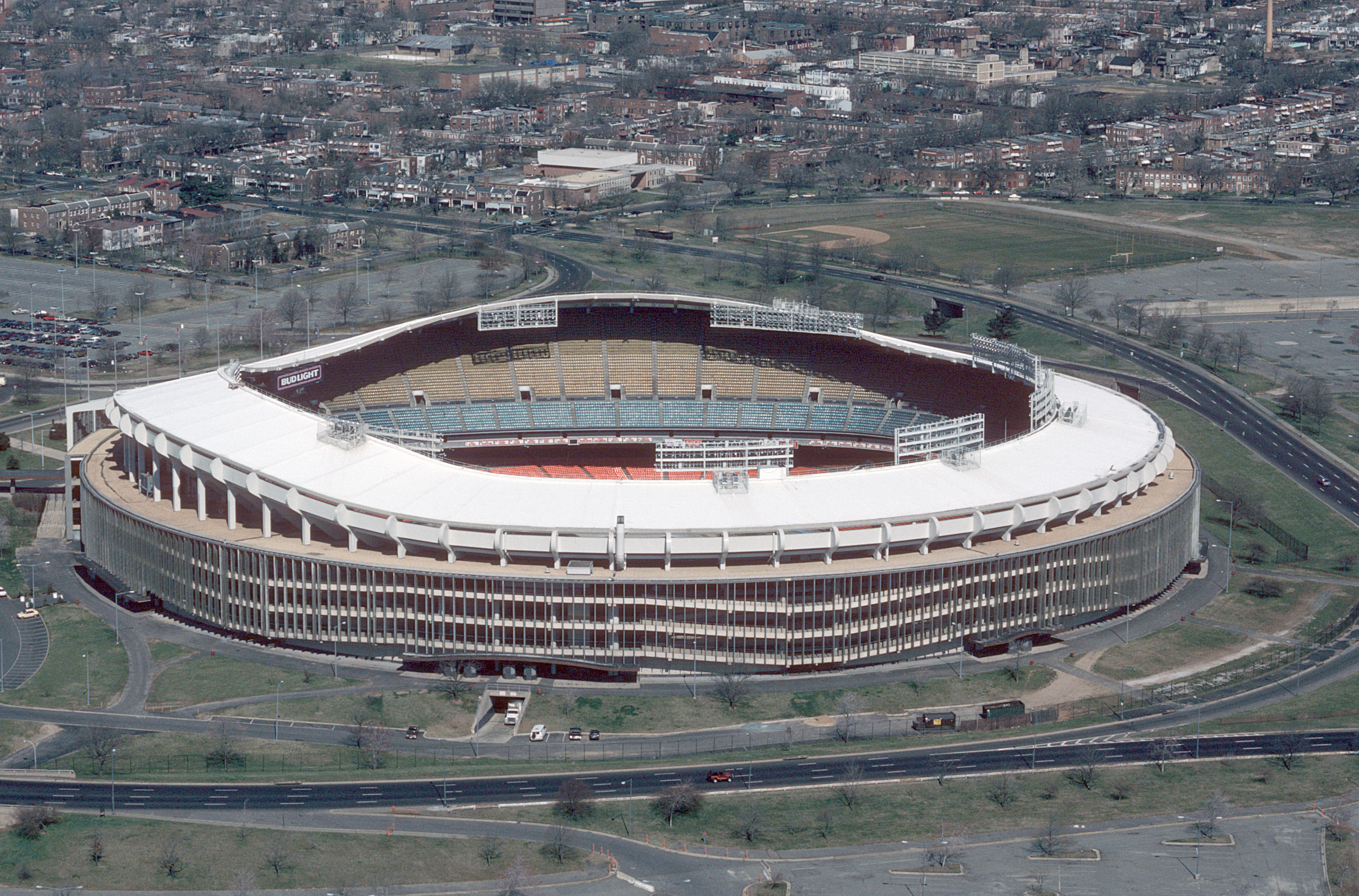
RFK Stadium was home to at least 10 professional teams.

Washington, D.C. is one of twelve U.S. cities with teams in all four major sports leagues (MLB, NBA, NFL, and NHL), and is one of eleven with teams in all those sports plus MLS. It is one of only five cities with teams in all of those five leagues plus the WNBA, the professional league for women's basketball, and one of only four that has teams in all of those leagues plus the NWSL, the professional league for women's soccer.

=== Soccer ===
==== Historic teams ====
Washington has had several professional soccer teams over the years. The Washington Whips played in the United Soccer Association between 1967 and 1968, playing their games at RFK Stadium, when it was known as D.C. Stadium. The Washington Darts played in the North American Soccer League (NASL) in 1970 and 1971. The Washington Diplomats played in the NASL from 1974 to 1981, and had a record attendance of 53,351 in a match against the New York Cosmos in 1980. Team America played in the NASL for one season in 1983, playing their home games at RFK Stadium.

Washington also has a history of women's professional soccer. The Washington Freedom were a professional women's team playing in the Washington area from 2001 until 2011. The team first played in the now-defunct Women's United Soccer Association (WUSA) between 2001 and 2003. The Freedom played at RFK for the three years of the league's existence and won the league championship in 2003, the WUSA's final year. Following the WUSA's demise, the team continued as an associate member of the W-League, playing their home games at the Maryland SoccerPlex in Germantown. In 2009, the team joined the Women's Professional Soccer (WPS) league. In 2011, the franchise relocated to Boca Raton, Florida.

==== Current teams ====
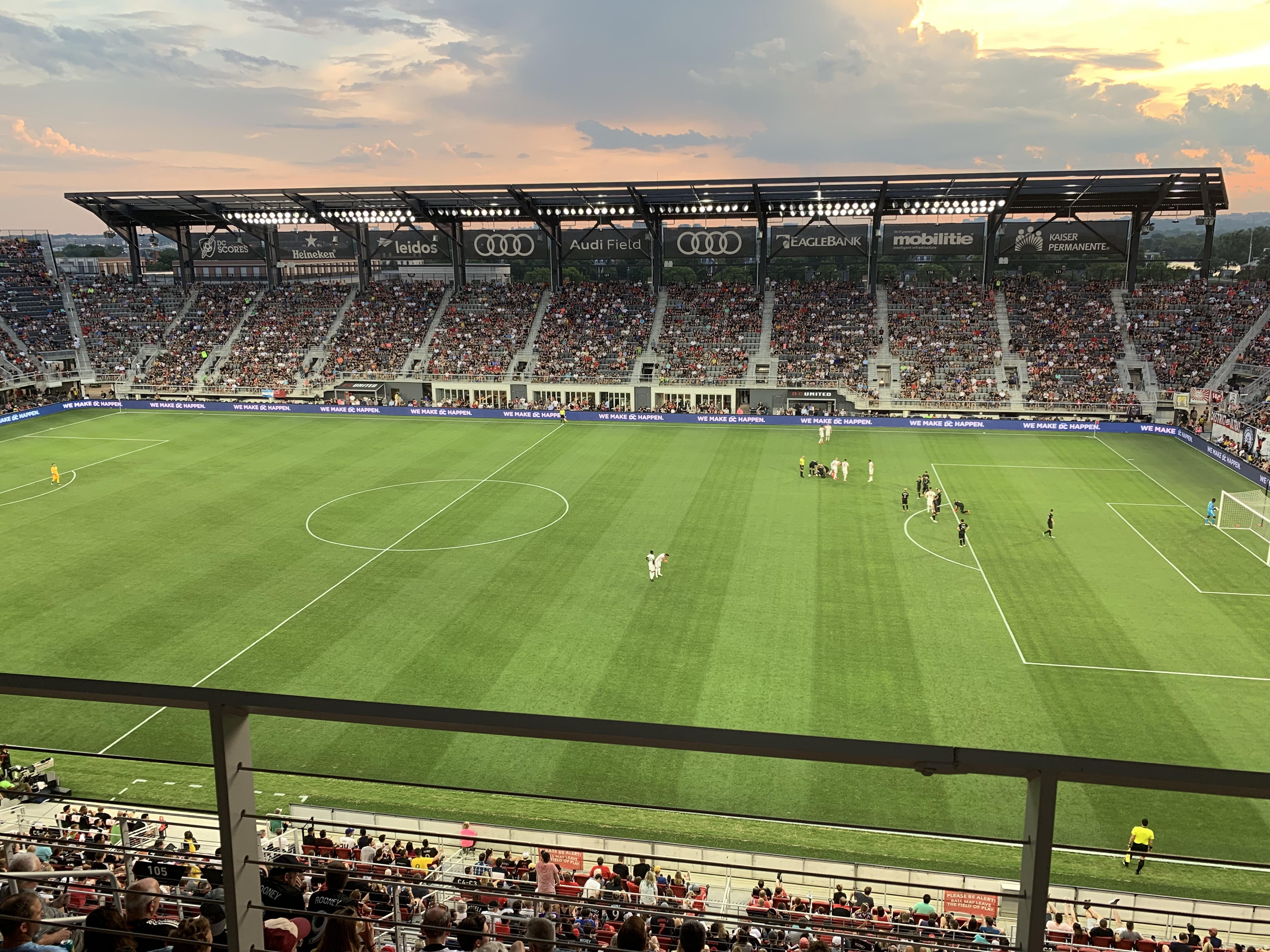
D.C. United match at Audi Field in 2019

Washington is home to an original Major League Soccer (MLS) club, D.C. United, which began play at RFK Stadium in 1996. One of the most successful MLS teams (with twelve major trophies, won domestically and at an international level), United has won four MLS Cups, including three of the first four played. They also won the U.S. Open Cup in their first year, in 2008, and again in 2013. In addition, United have captured four MLS Supporters Shields, the most out of any MLS club in the region. D.C. United's 1997 MLS Cup victory at RFK Stadium was the only time a Washington team has won a championship within the District. United is also the first American team to win the continental CONCACAF Champions Cup, which they won in 1998. United moved to their new home, Audi Field, in 2018.

The Washington Spirit began play as a women's professional soccer team in 2011 under the name D.C. United Women. In December 2012, the franchise rebranded as the Washington Spirit. During its early years, the team played at the Maryland SoccerPlex, but in 2019 it moved select games to Audi Field. In 2020, the Spirit began transitioning away from the SoccerPlex, playing four home games at each of three venues: the SoccerPlex, Audi Field, and Segra Field in Leesburg, Virginia. Then in 2021, the team left the SoccerPlex entirely, splitting home games between Audi Field and Segra Field. Beginning in 2023, the team moved all of its home games to Audi Field. The team is one of the eight charter members of the National Women's Soccer League (NWSL), a professional league launched by the United States Soccer Federation in 2013. The Spirit won the 2021 NWSL Championship.

Since 2019, the area has been represented in the second tier of U.S. men's soccer, the USL Championship, by Loudoun United FC, owned and operated by D.C. United as their official reserve side. Loudoun United started play at Audi Field, moving to their permanent home of Segra Field during their first season.

==== Other information ====
RFK Stadium has hosted two more MLS Cup championships. In 2000, the Kansas City Wizards (now known as Sporting Kansas City) won their first championship with a 1–0 win over the Chicago Fire. In the 2007 MLS Cup, the Houston Dynamo defeated the New England Revolution 2–1. RFK Memorial Stadium also served as a soccer venue in the 1994 FIFA World Cup and the 1996 Summer Olympics. RFK also hosted games during the 2003 FIFA Women's World Cup. Northwest Stadium has also hosted several prominent soccer games, including six matches in the 1999 FIFA Women's World Cup. In July 2011, a match between Manchester United and Barcelona at Northwest Stadium (then called FedExField) drew a crowd of 81,807, a record soccer attendance for the D.C. metropolitan area.

On October 29, 2022, Audi Field hosted the 2022 NWSL Championship game between the Portland Thorns FC and the Kansas City Current.

DC United has hosted three MLS All-Star Games. It hosted the 2002 and 2004 games at RFK Stadium. The team hosted the 2023 MLS All-Star Game at Audi Field on July 19, 2023.

On December 5, 2025, the draw for the 2026 FIFA World Cup was held at the Kennedy Center in the city's Foggy Bottom neighborhood. During the World Cup, a portion of the National Mall was converted into a Fan Zone with a large screen from which viewers could watch live games.

=== American football ===
==== Historic teams ====
In the early years of professional football, teams were focused mostly in the northeast of the US, with Philadelphia typically being the southern end of the highest professional circuit. However, Washington, D.C. had a very successful professional football team in the city during the early 1900s. The Washington Vigilants dominated the mid-Atlantic professional football landscape. From 1907 until 1914, they were an independent football team and were not affiliated with any league. During their existence, they played against several semi-professional and amateur football teams from Washington, D.C., including the Washington Potomacs, Washington Engineers, and Washington All-Stars. In the 1915 season, they were affiliated with the Ohio League, though the only team from that league they played against were the Youngstown Patricians. The team folded after the 1915 season.

The first professional football team in Washington, D.C. to compete in a country-wide football league were the Washington Senators. The team was founded in 1921, and played the 1921 season in the American Professional Football Association (APFA), which was renamed the National Football League (NFL) the next year. Following that one season, the team left the APFA and continued playing as an independent professional football team until 1941, when they folded. The team was also known as the Washington Pros and Washington Presidents during its existence. They practiced and played their home games at American League Park.

==== Current team ====
Sammy Baugh was among the NFL's early pioneers and among football's greatest ever players.

The NFL's Washington Commanders (known as the Washington Redskins until 2020 and the Washington Football Team from 2020 to 2021) have played professional football in the Washington, D.C. area since 1937, when the team moved from Boston, where it was founded in 1932. Believing the team would find greater financial success in the nation's capital, the team's owner, George Preston Marshall moved the team to Washington, where they played at Griffith Stadium until 1960. Upon arriving in Washington, the team found immediate success, winning the 1937 NFL Championship over the Chicago Bears, with a final score of 28-21. The Redskins were led by Sammy Baugh, who is widely considered to be one of the best and most important football players in the early years of the NFL. Baugh played multiple positions, including quarterback, defensive back, and punter. He was the first quarterback to popularize the forward pass, and threw the ball down field with greater success than any quarterback before. The Redskins lost the 1940 NFL Championship game 73-0 to the Bears, in what remains the most lopsided final score in NFL history. It is believed that the team performed so poorly in that game as a form of protest against the team's ownership. Sammy Baugh led the Redskins to their second championship in 1942 as well, defeating the Bears 14-6 in the championship game, which was played at Griffith Stadium in Washington. The Redskins lost the 1943 NFL Championship 41-21 to the Chicago Bears and lost the 1945 NFL Championship by a score of 15-14 to the Cleveland Rams.

From that final NFL Championship game appearance in 1945 to the 1970s, the Redskins were perennially among the worst teams in the league, even when Sonny Jurgensen took over as the team's quarterback in the 1960s. Jurgensen was widely considered to be among the greatest quarterbacks in NFL history during his time. Legendary NFL coach Vince Lombardi coached the Redskins for one season in 1969, before dying of cancer. That was the first season the Redskins finished with a winning record since 1955. George Allen coached the team to Super Bowl VII in 1972, where they lost to the undefeated Miami Dolphins, 14-7.

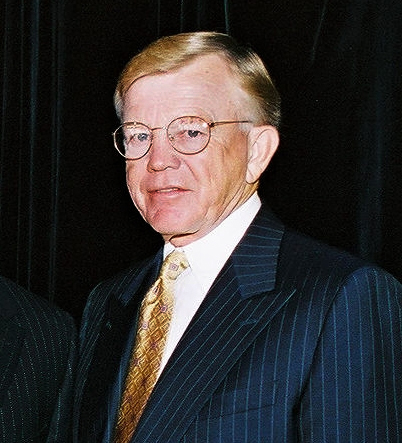
Joe Gibbs coached Washington to four Super Bowl appearances and three victories in a span of nine years from 1982 to 1991. He is the only NFL head coach to win Super Bowls with three different quarterbacks.

In 1981, the team's owner Jack Kent Cooke hired Joe Gibbs to be the new head coach. Gibbs led the Redskins to four Super Bowl appearances and three victories. The team won Super Bowl XVII in 1982, lost Super Bowl XVIII in 1983, won Super Bowl XXII in 1987, and won Super Bowl XXVI in 1991. Gibbs is considered to be among the greatest coaches in the history of professional football, and is the only coach to win Super Bowls with three different starting quarterbacks. The 1982 Super Bowl was won with Joe Theismann, the 1987 Super Bowl was won with Doug Williams—who became the first Black quarterback to start in and win a Super Bowl—and the 1991 Super Bowl was won with Mark Rypien as quarterback.

The success of the Redskins in the 1980s and early 1990s vaulted the team to become one of the most important and widely supported sports franchises in the country. In the D.C. area, the Redskins were perhaps the most important cultural entity, as stores would close and people would return to their homes or go to bars to watch Redskins games. The team's valuation increased to being the second highest valued sports team in the world by the time Daniel Snyder purchased the team in 1999.

In 1997, the team moved to a new stadium in Landover, Maryland, an eastern suburb of Washington. This marked the first time the team played its home games outside the District of Columbia since moving there in 1937. From 1961 through 1997, the team played their home games at RFK Stadium, which had become among the country's most iconic sports and football venues.

In the years since Gibbs' retirement in 1993, the team's move to what is now known as Northwest Stadium in Landover, and Snyder's purchase of the team, the glory years have faded and the team's success has dried up. Although Gibbs returned to coach the team from 2004 to 2007, the success of his earlier stint as head coach was not re-lived.

In 2020, following decades of controversy regarding the team's Native American name, and decisions by several of the team's largest sponsors to stop financing the team until they changed their name, the organization announced that they were dropping the name Redskins, using the temporary name of Washington Football Team until rebranding as the Washington Commanders in 2022.

In 2023, Daniel Snyder, whose ownership of the team had been mired in controversy amid a lack of on-field success since buying it in 1999, sold the team to an investment group led by Josh Harris, owner of the Philadelphia 76ers and New Jersey Devils, for $6.05 billion. In addition to Harris, the group has 20 limited partners worth a combined $100 billion, including Danaher founder and art collector Mitchell Rales, Basketball Hall of Famer Magic Johnson, 76ers and Devils co-owner David Blitzer, venture capitalist and Washington Kastles owner Mark Ein, Maverick Capital founder Lee Ainslie, Blue Owl Capital founders Marc Lipschultz and Doug Ostrover, financier Alejandro Santo Domingo and his family, ProShares founder Michael Sapir, former Google CEO Eric Schmidt, and Cambridge Information Group CEO Andy Snyder. The deal was the highest price ever paid for a sports team.

In 2024, the second year of Harris’ ownership, the team won their first playoff game since 2005 and made their first NFC Championship Game appearance since 1991, before losing to division rival and the eventual Super Bowl LIX champion Philadelphia Eagles, marking a turnaround in the team’s success in recent years.

==== Other teams ====
Two other professional football leagues to have had teams in Washington include the indoor Arena Football League (AFL) and XFL, which merged with the USFL to form the United Football League (UFL).

The Washington Commandos competed in the Arena League in 1987, 1989, and 1990. In 1987 and 1989, the team played their home games at the Capital Centre in the suburb of Landover, Maryland. In 1989, the team was known as the Maryland Commandos. In 1990, they played their home games at the Patriot Center in Fairfax, Virginia, and returned to being called the Washington Commandos.

The Washington Valor competed in the AFL from 2017 to 2019. As an indoor football league that competes on a smaller playing surface than traditional football, the team played their home games in Capital One Arena. Although the team finished with an overall regular season record of 12-26 and an overall postseason record of 2-3, they won ArenaBowl XXXI in 2018 by a score of 69-55 against the Baltimore Brigade. Following the 2019 season, the AFL was suspended indefinitely, and the Valor have not played since.

The DC Defenders competed in the XFL from 2020 until 2023. They play their home games at Audi Field. In the 2023 season, the Defenders finished with a league-best record of 9-1 in the regular season and were the heavy favorites going into the playoffs. However, they lost the 2023 XFL Championship Game to the Arlington Renegades, 35-26. Following the 2023 XFL and USFL merger, the Defenders became part of the UFL, where they currently compete. The Defenders won the 2025 UFL championship, beating the Michigan Panthers 58-34 at the Dome at America's Center in Saint Louis, Missouri.

The D.C. Divas of the Women's Football Alliance are a women's tackle football team based in the Washington area. They've competed since 2000, and won the championship in 2006, 2015, and 2016.

==== Other information ====
The headquarters of the National Football League Players Association (NFLPA), which is the labor union representing the players of the NFL, is located in the Upshaw Place building on 20th Street in Northwest Washington.

The 1941 NFL draft was held at the Willard Hotel in Washington and the 2027 NFL draft will be held on the National Mall in downtown Washington.

Audi Field hosted the 2026 UFL championship game on June 13, 2026.

The Commanders are scheduled to move to the New Stadium at RFK Campus at the site of the former RFK Stadium in 2030.

=== Baseball ===
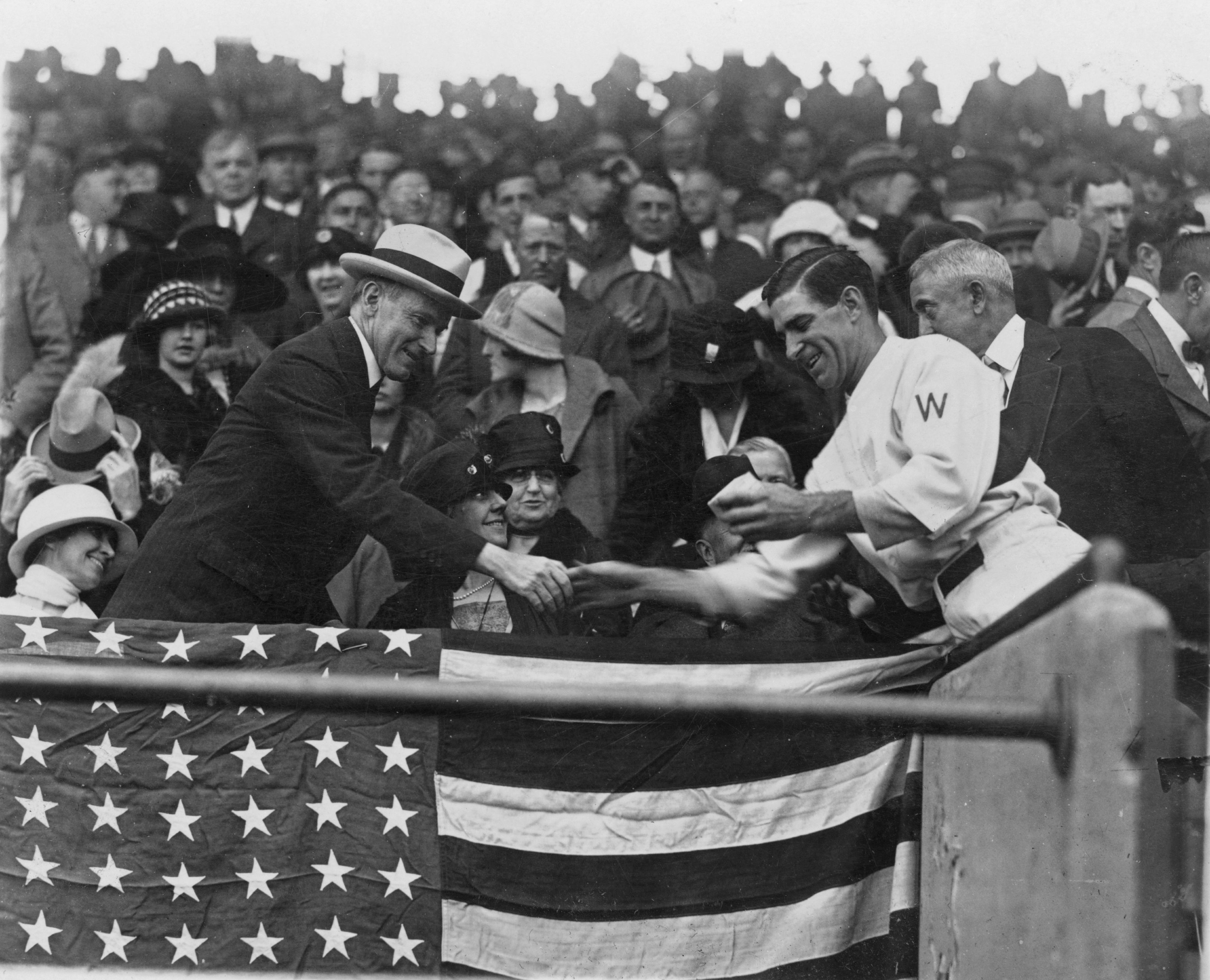
Washington Senators manager Bucky Harris presents President Calvin Coolidge with the ball used to open the 1924 World Series.

==== Historic teams ====
Washington's first professional baseball team was the Washington Olympics, which played in Washington, D.C. in 1871 and 1872. A new team known as the Washington Senators played in the American Association in 1891, after which it played in the National League (NL) for the duration of its existence. After this Senators franchise folded in 1899, another Washington Senators team was founded in 1901 and played in the American League (AL). This franchise was officially called the Washington Nationals from 1905 to 1955, but was commonly called the "Senators" during its time in Washington. The team played from 1911 onwards at Griffith Stadium in Northwest Washington. The Senators won the 1924 World Series in seven games against the New York Giants, with game seven at Griffith Stadium ending in the bottom of the 12th inning. The team also won the 1925 and 1933 AL Pennants. This team left for Minnesota in 1960 and became the Minnesota Twins. The very next season, an expansion Washington Senators franchise was founded in the city, and played in Washington from 1961 to 1971. Following the 1971 season, the team moved to Dallas and became the Texas Rangers.

The ceremonial first pitch, which is now common across baseball, began in Washington in 1910 when President William Howard Taft threw out the first pitch at the Senators' Opening Day game.

Several Negro league baseball teams played in Washington including the Black Senators and the Elite Giants. The longest lasting was the Homestead Grays, which played some home games in Washington from 1940 to 1950. Though officially based in the Pittsburgh area, the Grays played a number of home games at their "home away from home", Griffith Stadium in Washington, and were often referred to as the Washington Grays. The Grays won the Negro League World Series in 1943, 1944, and 1948.

==== Current team ====
Nationals Park is the current home of the Washington Nationals.

Washington was without a professional baseball team for over three decades until Major League Baseball relocated the Montreal Expos to the city for the 2005 season, becoming the Washington Nationals. In the interim, the Baltimore Orioles served as Washington's home team. Orioles ownership marketed the team heavily to Washington baseball fans, even removing "Baltimore" from the team's uniform (however, since the return of baseball to the D.C. area, "Baltimore" is now on the uniform again). The Orioles' reliance on the Washington market became a hindrance to Washington's efforts to gain their own baseball team as Orioles ownership lobbied Major League Baseball to keep a professional team out of Washington. Eventually, baseball's owners, burdened with a poorly performing Montreal franchise, were convinced to move the team to Washington with the promise of a brand new stadium fully financed by the D.C. government. Orioles' owner Peter Angelos cast the lone dissenting vote in the 28–1 decision. After spending their first three seasons at RFK Stadium, the Nationals began playing at Nationals Park in the Navy Yard neighborhood in 2008. The Nationals won their first-ever World Series pennant in 2019, beating the Houston Astros in seven games.

==== Other information ====
Washington, D.C. has hosted five Major League Baseball All-Star Games. The Washington Senators hosted the 1937 and 1956 All-Star Games at Griffith Stadium. The 1962 and 1969 Games were hosted by the next Washington Senators franchise and were played at RFK Stadium. The 2018 All-Star Game was hosted by the Nationals at Nationals Park.

=== Basketball ===
==== Historic teams ====
Washington's first professional basketball team was the Washington Capitols, which played in the inaugural season of the Basketball Association of America (BAA) (the precursor to the National Basketball Association (NBA)). The team played their home games at Uline Arena. In 1946, their first year, the Capitols had a .817 winning percentage, and had a 17-game winning streak at one point during the season. The team began the 1948–49 season with a 15-game winning streak. The Capitols continued playing in the BAA until halting operations on January 9, 1951.

There were no professional basketball teams in Washington until the Oakland Oaks moved to Washington in 1969 and formed the Washington Caps. The Caps played as part of the American Basketball Association (ABA). They played their home games in Uline Arena, which was then known as the Washington Coliseum. The team only played two seasons in Washington, before moving to Norfolk, Virginia in 1970 to become the Virginia Squires.

==== Current teams ====
On December 2, 1973, the NBA's Baltimore Bullets moved to the Washington area and played their first home game at the newly built Capital Centre in Landover, Maryland. The team changed their name to the Capital Bullets during their first year in the Washington area. Their second year, they changed their city designation and became the Washington Bullets. Despite the name change, the team continued to play many of their home games in Baltimore at the Baltimore Civic Center. The Bullets went to the NBA Finals in 1975, where they were swept in four games by the Golden State Warriors.

The Bullets' next appearance in the NBA Finals happened in 1978, when they beat the heavily favored Seattle SuperSonics in seven games. To date, this is the franchise's only league title. The two teams met again in the 1979 NBA Finals, with the Sonics winning 4 games to 1.

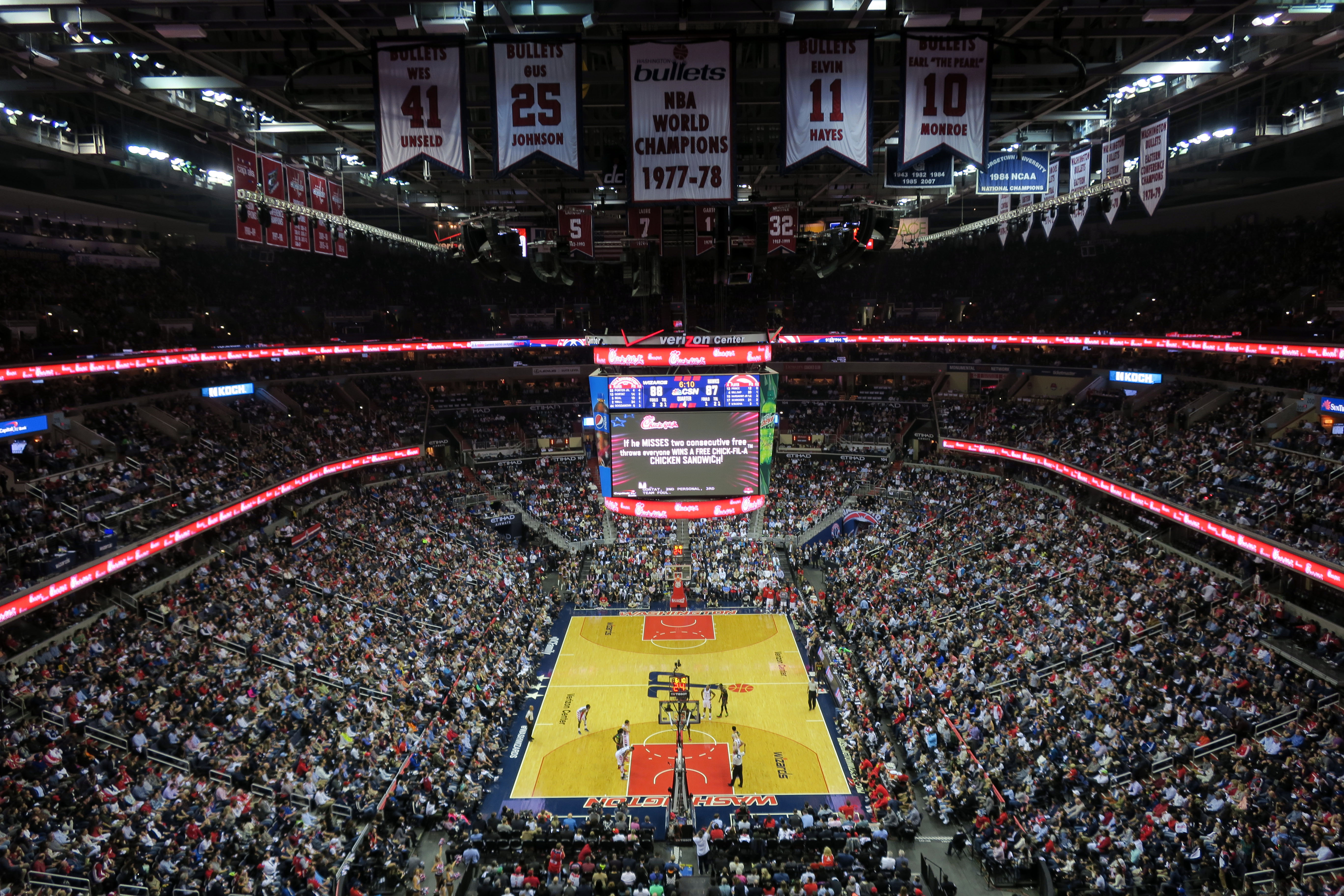
The NBA's Washington Wizards play at Capital One Arena.

In 1995, team owner Abe Pollin announced the Bullets would change their name out of sensitivity to the high rate of gun violence in Washington, D.C. Following a fan vote, the team became known as the Washington Wizards on May 15, 1997. Later that year, the Wizards moved to D.C. to play in the newly constructed MCI Center, now known as Capital One Arena. This new arena was constructed by Pollin. Since the 1980s, the team has suffered from many losing seasons, and did not win a playoff series for 23 years until 2005. They followed up this season by making the playoffs the next four years under the leadership of star point guard, Gilbert Arenas.

Following the departure of star players like Arenas, Antawn Jamison, and Caron Butler, the Wizards finished with the 5th worst record in the 2009-10 NBA season. The team subsequently won the 2010 Draft Lottery and selected Kentucky point guard John Wall with the first pick, whom new owner Ted Leonsis and team president Ernie Grunfeld would build the team around in the years to come. Despite this, success remained mediocre, and attendance has flat-lined as the team continues to struggle perennially.

Women's basketball has also played an important part in Washington's basketball history. In 1998, soon after the opening of the new MCI Center, an expansion team in the Women's National Basketball Association (WNBA), the Washington Mystics, began playing their home games there. Despite having only two winning seasons and a mere four playoff wins in their early years, the Mystics led the league in attendance from 1998 through 2000 and again from 2002 through 2004. The team hung six banners in their home arena, touting themselves as "Attendance Champions". These banners were frequently criticized and in 2010 the new owner of the team and arena, Ted Leonsis, ordered them removed.

The Mystics moved to the newly constructed CareFirst Arena in Southeast D.C. in 2019. The arena hosts the Wizards' practice facility as well. Their first season in the new arena saw the Mystics claim their first WNBA title, with the team's star player, Elena Delle Donne, being named season MVP on the strength of the first 50–40–90 season in league history, and Emma Meesseman earning Finals MVP honors.

The 2018–19 season marked the debut of the Capital City Go-Go, a team owned by the Wizards that plays in the NBA's official minor league, the NBA G League. The Go-Go play at CareFirst Arena.

==== Other information ====
Washington, D.C. hosted the NBA All-Star Game once at the MCI Center (now Capital One Arena) in 2001. The same arena has hosted two WNBA All-Star Games, one in 2002 and another in 2007.

The city often hosts games where the Harlem Globetrotters play against the Washington Generals, a team named in honor of President Dwight D. Eisenhower.

=== Ice hockey ===
==== Historic teams ====
From 1939 through 1942, the Washington Eagles were a minor league hockey team playing in the Eastern Hockey League, which was a minor league made up of teams focused mostly on the eastern United States. They won the league championship in 1940-41. The next season, the team competed for fans with the newly established Washington Lions of the American Hockey League, which was another minor league. Ultimately, the Lions succeeded in getting a larger fanbase than the Eagles, leading the Eagles to stop operations in 1942. The Lions played initially in Washington from 1941 to 1943 and then again from 1947 to 1949. They played their homes games at Uline Ice Arena in Northeast D.C. In 1949, the team moved to Cincinnati and became the Cincinnati Mohawks. The team returned to Washington in 1951, again with the name Washington Lions. This time, however, the team was a part of the Eastern Hockey League. In an effort to rebrand and increase its fanbase, the team changed its name in 1957 to the Washington Presidents. Despite its attempt to rebrand, the team was financially unstable and ended up folding in 1960.

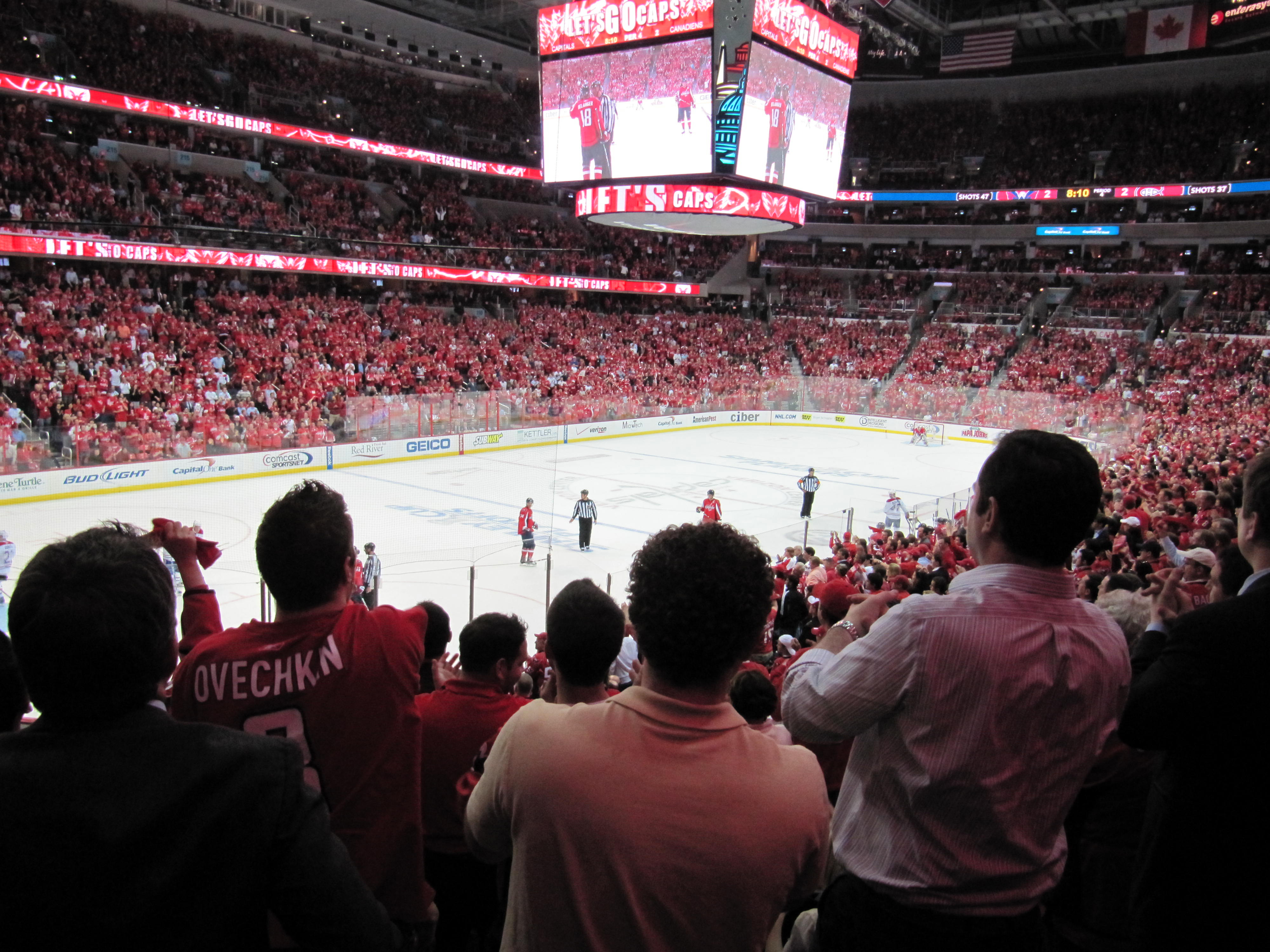
The NHL's Washington Capitals play their homes games at Capital One Arena.

==== Current team ====
Following many years without professional ice hockey in Washington, businessman and sports team owner Abe Pollin decided to purchase an expansion team in the National Hockey League (NHL) for Washington, D.C. The new hockey team for Washington was created as part of the NHL's 1974 expansion. Pollin offered fans the opportunity to send in suggestions for the team's new name. Ultimately, he chose to call the new hockey team the Washington Capitals, often shortened to Caps.

Their first season, the Capitals only won eight games, which earned them an NHL-record low .131 winning percentage. The team found greater success through the 1980s and 1990s. From the 1982-83 season through the 1995-96 season, the Caps made the playoffs every year and won the division in 1988-89.

After spending their first 23 seasons playing in the Capital Centre in Landover, Maryland, the Caps moved into D.C. to play in the newly constructed MCI Center (now known as Capital One Arena) located in Chinatown in 1997. A competitive high point for the team came in their first season in the new arena, when they defeated the Buffalo Sabres in the Eastern Conference Finals, earning a trip to the Stanley Cup Final, where they were swept in four games by the Detroit Red Wings. In 1999, the team was purchased by local businessman Ted Leonsis.

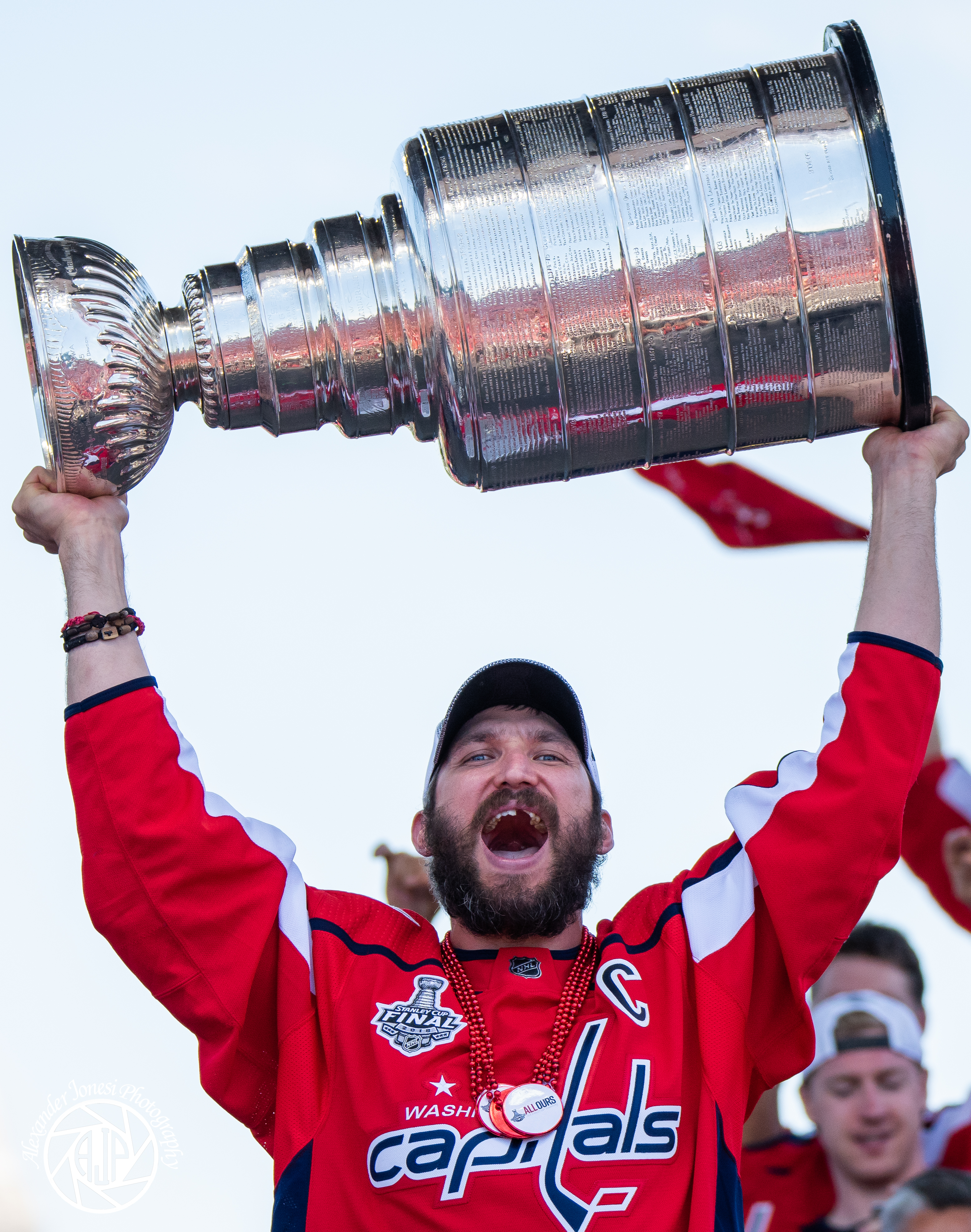
Alexander Ovechkin celebrating the Capitals' 2018 Stanley Cup championship

For many years after the Cup Final appearance, the team struggled mightily on the ice. In 2004, the Capitals drafted Russian winger Alexander Ovechkin with the first overall draft pick. The team made the playoffs in 2007-08, which was the beginning of a long stretch during which the team was consistently among the best in the league. Despite the many regular season successes during this time, including seven division titles and three Presidents' Trophy wins between 2007 and 2017, the team struggled to achieve playoff success, and failed to make it past the second round.

This playoff disappointment ended when Evgeny Kuznetsov lifted the Capitals over the rival Pittsburgh Penguins in overtime of Game 6 in the second round of the 2018 Stanley Cup playoffs to advance to the Eastern Conference Finals for the first time in 20 years. Led by their captain Alexander Ovechkin, the Capitals went on to defeat the Tampa Bay Lightning in seven games to claim the title as 2017–18 Eastern Conference champions, the second title in franchise history. On June 7, 2018, the Capitals defeated the Vegas Golden Knights in five games to win their first Stanley Cup in franchise history. Among the most important members of this team were Ovechkin, Kuznetsov, goalie Braden Holtby, defensman John Carlson, and center Nicklas Backstrom. The team was coached by Barry Trotz.

In addition to their Stanley Cup championship and two Eastern Conference championships, the Capitals have won three Presidents' Trophies for having the best regular season record and have claimed 13 division titles. The team won four straight division championships as members of the Southeast Division between the 2007 and 2010 seasons, and five straight in the current Metropolitan Division, between 2015 and 2020. Four Capitals players have been inducted into the Hockey Hall of Fame: Mike Gartner, Rod Langway, Larry Murphy, and Scott Stevens. Ovechkin is widely considered to be among the greatest NHL players in history and holds the record for most regular-season goals in NHL history.

==== Other information ====
The Capitals hosted the 1982 NHL All-Star Game at the Capital Centre in Landover, Maryland.

=== Tennis ===
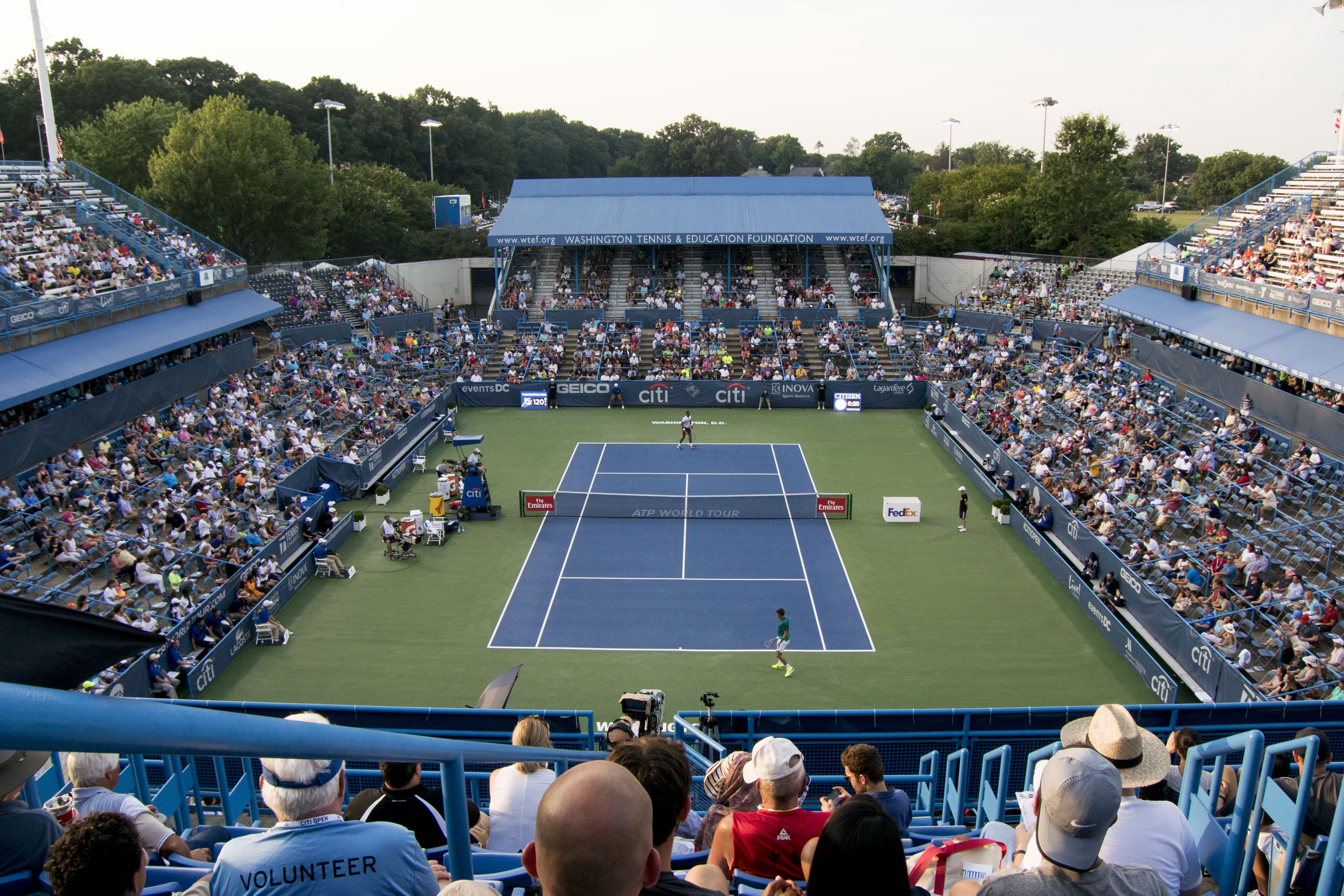
The Washington Open, which began in 1969, is the world's only joint ATP 500 and WTA 500 event

In late July and early August, Washington hosts an annual joint ATP Tour men's tennis and WTA Tour women's tennis event: the Washington Open at the William H.G. FitzGerald Tennis Center in Rock Creek Park. The tournament has been held at the same venue since its founding in 1969. It is an ATP 500 and WTA 500 event, and serves as a popular tune-up tournament prior to the US Open. It is the first tennis tournament in history to be both an ATP 500 and WTA 500 event, and is one of the few tournaments in the world to host both men and women. The tournament's sponsorship name is currently the Mubadala DC Open.

From 1972 until 1991, Washington hosted the Virginia Slims of Washington, a WTA Tour women's tennis tournament. It was played on indoor carpet courts from 1972 to 1975 and then again from 1978 to 1990. It was played on indoor hard courts from 1976 to 1977, and was played on outdoor hard courts during its final year in 1991. The most successful champion at the tournament was Martina Navratilova, who won the singles title nine times.

In July 2008, the Washington Kastles, a World TeamTennis (WTT) team founded by Mark Ein, played their first season in a temporary stadium in downtown Washington, D.C. finishing with a 6–8 record. In 2009, despite losing their first four matches, the Kastles won the WTT championship. The Kastles were 8–6 and just missed the playoffs in 2010. In 2011, the Kastles moved to Kastles Stadium at the Wharf at 800 Water Street, SW in Washington right off Maine Avenue. The Kastles played the 2011, 2012 and 2013 seasons there. In 2011, the Kastles posted a perfect season of 16–0 and won the WTT Championship. The 2011 season was the 36th for World Team Tennis, and the Kastles became the first team to accomplish the feat of a perfect season. They posted a second perfect season of 16–0 in 2012, and won another WTT Championship, becoming the only professional sports team to have back-to-back undefeated seasons. In 2013, the Kastles won their first match of the season to post a record of 33 straight wins, equaling the 33 games winning streak of the 1971–72 Los Angeles Lakers of the NBA. The Kastles won the second match of the season to set a new record of 34 straight wins by a top-tier professional sports team. Even though the Kastles lost the third and fourth matches of the 2013 season, they went undefeated for the remainder of the season to finish with a 14–2 record and won their third consecutive WTT Championship. In 2014, the Kastles moved to Kastles Stadium at the Charles E. Smith Center on the campus of George Washington University and won their fourth consecutive WTT Championship with an overall record of 12–4. In the first seven years of the franchise, the Kastles won five WTT titles.

=== Golf ===
The wider Washington region has hosted multiple professional golf tournaments, including men's and women's majors. The 1921 U.S. Open was played at Columbia Country Club in Chevy Chase, Maryland, just north of the city's borders. The 1964, 1997, and 2011 U.S. Opens were played at Congressional Country Club in Bethesda, Maryland. Congressional also served as the location for the 1976 PGA Championship. The 1994 U.S. Women's Open was played at the Prince George's Golf and Country Club in Landover, Maryland. Congressional hosted the 2022 Women's PGA Championship. The 2027 Women's PGA Championship and 2031 Men's PGA Championship are scheduled to be played at Congressional.

Congressional also served as the home for the PGA Tour's Kemper Open from 1980 through 1986, and again in 2005. The course also hosted The National, which was Tiger Woods' tournament, from 2007 to 2009, again from 2012 to 2014, and one final time in 2016. Woods' tournament was played at the Robert Trent Jones Golf Club in the D.C. suburb of Gainesville, Virginia in 2015 and at TPC Potomac at Avenel Farm in suburban Potomac, Maryland in 2017 and 2018. TPC Potomac also hosted the tournament originally known as the Kemper Open from 1987 to 2004 and again in 2006. It also hosted the Wells Fargo Championship in 2022.

=== Racing ===
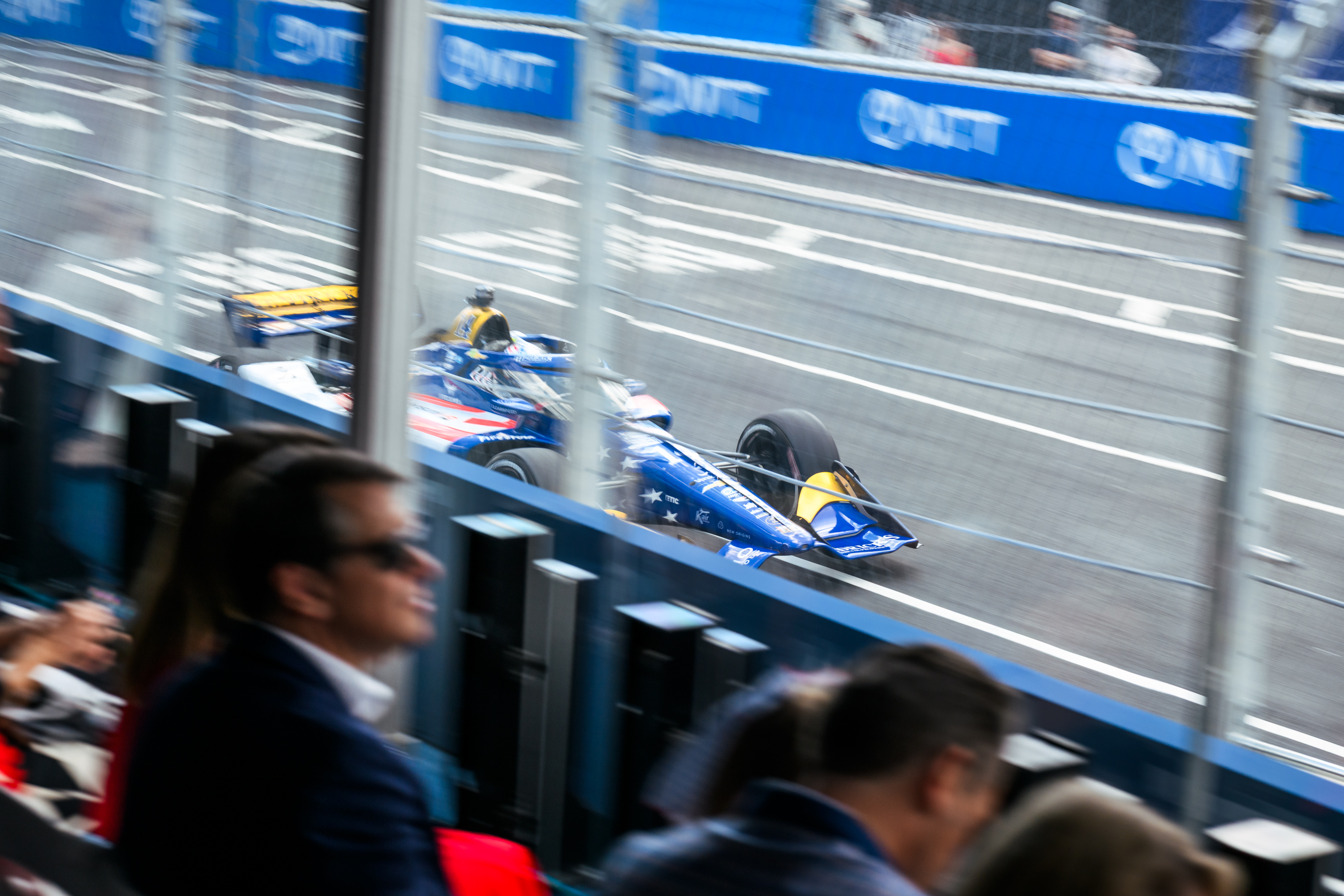
Freedom 250 Grand Prix was an IndyCar streetrace run along the National Mall in August 2026

The Preakness Stakes, which is second leg of the prestigious Triple Crown of Thoroughbred horse races, occurs annually in May in nearby Baltimore at Pimlico Race Course.

Washington hosted an American Le Mans Series car race in 2002 around the RFK Stadium grounds, known as the Grand Prix of Washington D.C.

Washington hosted the Freedom 250 Grand Prix on the Washington Street Circuit around the National Mall and Downtown Washington in August 2026, with the start-finish line being in front of the U.S. Capitol. The 250-mile race was an IndyCar series race, and was held in honor of the country's 250th anniversary.

Richmond Raceway in nearby Richmond, Virginia hosts multiple NASCAR races each year, and has previously held IndyCar races as well.

=== Fighting, boxing, and wrestling ===
Washington has hosted numerous WWE events, as well as the final four editions of WCW's Starrcade. Capital One Arena has hosted Backlash in 2000, SummerSlam in 2005, Cyber Sunday in 2007, Survivor Series in 2009, Capitol Punishment in 2011, and Battleground in 2016. The arena frequently hosts Raw and SmackDown shows as well.

Capital One Arena was also home to Mike Tyson's final fight (Mike Tyson vs. Kevin McBride) on June 11, 2005. On October 1, 2011, UFC Live: Cruz vs. Johnson was held at the arena.

On December 7, 2019, UFC on ESPN: Overeem vs. Rozenstruik was held at Capital One Arena.

On October 2, 2019, Capital One Arena hosted AEW Dynamite, the first televised professional wrestling event by All Elite Wrestling. It was broadcast on TNT in the United States of America and on ITV4 in the United Kingdom.

=== Cricket ===
In 2023, a new Twenty20 Cricket league called Major League Cricket formed and gave Washington, D.C. one of 6 teams to start the league's inaugural season. They're called the Washington Freedom and they became the 2024 MLC champions by winning the 2024 Major League Cricket final over the San Francisco Unicorns by a 96 run deficit.

== Collegiate sports ==
The following universities with sports programs are located in the Washington, D.C. metropolitan area:

| School | Nickname | Conference | Division |
|---|---|---|---|
| American University | Eagles | Patriot League | NCAA Division I |
| The George Washington University | Revolutionaries | Atlantic 10 | NCAA Division I |
| Georgetown University | Hoyas | Big East; Patriot League (football) | NCAA Division I |
| George Mason University (Fairfax, Virginia) | Patriots | Atlantic 10 | NCAA Division I |
| Howard University | Bison | MEAC | NCAA Division I |
| University of Maryland (College Park, Maryland) | Terrapins | Big Ten | NCAA Division I |
| Mount St. Mary's University (Emmitsburg, Maryland) | Mountaineers | Northeast | NCAA Division I |
| Bowie State University (Bowie, Maryland) | Bulldogs | CIAA | NCAA Division II |
| University of the District of Columbia | Firebirds | Independent; ECC (tennis) | NCAA Division II |
| Shepherd University (Shepherdstown, West Virginia) | Rams | PSAC | NCAA Division II |
| The Catholic University of America | Cardinals | Landmark; NEWMAC (football) | NCAA Division III |
| Gallaudet University | Bison | NEAC; ECFC (football) | NCAA Division III |
| Hood College (Frederick, Maryland) | Blazers | MAC Commonwealth (Note: The Middle Atlantic Conferences is an umbrella organization that operates three separate leagues. All MAC schools are members of either the MAC Commonwealth or MAC Freedom, leagues that sponsor competition in the same set of 14 sports, including men's and women's basketball, but not football. The MAC sponsors 13 additional sports, including football, through its Middle Atlantic Conference (singular).) | NCAA Division III |
| University of Mary Washington (Fredericksburg, Virginia) | Eagles | CAC | NCAA Division III |
| Marymount University (Arlington, Virginia) | Saints | Atlantic East | NCAA Division III |
| Trinity Washington University | Tigers | Independent | NCAA Division III |

On December 20, 2008, Washington hosted its first college bowl game, the EagleBank Bowl, at RFK Stadium. The first match-up saw Wake Forest defeat Navy, 29–19. After the sponsorship deal between the bowl organizers and EagleBank expired following the 2009 edition, the game was renamed the Military Bowl, thanks to a new sponsorship deal with a major defense contractor. The game left the Washington metropolitan area after its 2012 edition; it has since been played at Navy–Marine Corps Memorial Stadium in Annapolis, Maryland, which lies within the Baltimore metropolitan area.

=== Georgetown basketball ===
Georgetown University began fielding a basketball team in 1907. The Georgetown Hoyas compete in the Big East Conference. They have won eight Big East tournament championships and ten Big East regular season championships. They have appeared the NCAA Final Four five times, winning the national championship in 1984; that team was coached by John Thompson. Several NBA players got their start playing for Georgetown including Patrick Ewing, Allen Iverson, Alonzo Mourning, Dikembe Mutombo, and Reggie Williams. The Hoyas play their home games at Capital One Arena.

=== Maryland basketball ===
The University of Maryland men's basketball team, which plays at the Xfinity Center in College Park, Maryland just northeast of the city's border, won the 2001 NCAA men's basketball tournament and made the Final Four in 2001 and 2002. They qualified for the Elite Eight in 1973, 1975, 2001, and 2002. The 2001 championship team was coached by Gary Williams.

=== Hosting collegiate sporting events ===
Capital One Arena has hosted games in the NCAA Division I men's basketball tournament numerous times over the years. The city hosted first and second round games in 1998, 2002, 2008, and 2011, and hosted the regional finals (sweet sixteen and elite eight) in 2006, 2013, 2019, and 2026. The 2005–06 George Mason Patriots men's basketball team from neighboring Fairfax, Virginia advanced to the Final Four in the Washington, D.C. region of the NCAA bracket, and played their sweet sixteen and elite eight games at Capital One Arena in 2006. The arena also hosted the Atlantic 10 men's basketball tournament in 2018, 2022, and 2025. It hosted the ACC men's basketball tournament in 2005, 2016, and 2024. In 2017, the arena hosted the Big Ten Men's basketball tournament.

Capital One Arena also hosted the 2009 "Frozen Four," the final two rounds of the 2009 NCAA Division I Men's Ice Hockey Tournament.

Jones-Hill House in College Park, Maryland (the former home of the Maryland Terrapins men's and women's basketball teams), hosted the first and second rounds of the NCAA men's basketball tournament in 1968 and 1991, and the sweet sixteen and elite eight in 1962, 1963, 1965, 1967, 1969, and 1977. And the Capital Centre in Landover, Maryland hosted the first and second rounds in 1994.

Northwest Stadium in Landover, Maryland has served as a neutral site for numerous college football games over the years. Among the most prominent were the 112th Army–Navy Game, played in 2011, and 125th game, played in 2024.

== Other sports ==
=== Flag football ===
Washington, D.C. is home to 22 flag football teams that play under the DC Gay Flag Football League which is part of the National Gay Flag Football League. In 1994, the DC League formed as an organized unit. The DCGFFL won the Gay Bowl in 2003 and 2004. In September 2010, DCGFFL premiered in its first season as an official league as part of the NGFFL. Washington, D.C. hosted the Gay Bowl in 2016 on the National Mall.

=== Lacrosse ===
Fairfax, Virginia in the Washington suburbs was home to the Washington Bayhawks of Major League Lacrosse (MLL). The Bayhawks moved to George Mason Stadium, after playing one season at Georgetown University and six seasons in Baltimore. The Bayhawks are one of Major League Lacrosse's original six teams, created in 2001 the same year the league started. The Bayhawks have twice won championships in the MLL in 2002 and 2005. The Bayhawks began playing their home games at Navy–Marine Corps Memorial Stadium in Annapolis, Maryland, which is in the federally defined Baltimore Metropolitan Area, for the 2009 season and changed their name to the Chesapeake Bayhawks in 2010. The Washington Power were a member of the National Lacrosse League (NLL), which is a box lacrosse league, during the 2001 and 2002 seasons. After the inaugural championship in 1987 in Baltimore (as the Thunder) through 1999 and an unsuccessful stint in Pittsburgh (as the CrosseFire), the franchise moved to Washington, D.C. in 2001. They played their first season at the MCI Center (now Capital One Arena), and their second season at the Capital Centre in Landover, Maryland. After two seasons of low attendance in Washington, the franchise moved, this time to Denver, Colorado, and became the Colorado Mammoth. In Colorado they have seen success both on and off the field, culminating in 2006, when they had the highest attendance in the league, and also won the Champion's Cup.

=== Rugby union ===
The Washington, D.C. area has been home to numerous rugby union teams, including men's, women's, college and high school. Prominent club teams include the Washington Rugby Football Club, Washington Irish R.F.C., Potomac Athletic Club and the Maryland Exiles. The latter two clubs merged in 2014 as the Potomac Exiles Rugby Club. The Maryland Terrapins rugby team plays in the Atlantic Coast Rugby League against its traditional ACC rivals. At the high school level, Gonzaga fields one of the strongest programs in the country, and Pride rugby (formerly Hyde rugby) gained national attention as the first rugby program at a predominantly African-American school.

In 2018, it was announced that Paul Sheehy, owner and director of used operations for Sheehy Auto Stores, and Chris Dunlavey, president and co-founder of Brailsford & Dunlavey, have secured the right to launch a D.C.-based Major League Rugby (MLR) team, named Old Glory DC. The Scottish Rugby Union has a part ownership of the team. The team is coached by Nate Osborne in an interim capacity after former head coach Andrew Douglas departed the club halfway through the 2022 season. Old Glory played an abbreviated schedule of exhibition games in 2019 and began regular-season MLR play in 2020.

=== Rugby league ===
The only rugby league team representing Washington DC are the Washington DC Cavalry who play in the USA Rugby League. Past teams include the Washington DC Slayers and the Northern Virginia Eagles.

=== Australian rules football ===
The Baltimore Washington Eagles played in the United States Australian Football League (USAFL) from 1998 until 2017. That year, the team split into two separate franchises. The DC Eagles became the team representing Washington and the Baltimore Dockers began representing Baltimore.

=== Running ===
Washington is home to two annual marathon races: the Marine Corps Marathon which is held every autumn and the Rock 'n' Roll USA Marathon held in the spring. The Marine Corps Marathon begun in 1976 is sometimes called "The People's Marathon" because it is the largest marathon without prize money. The Cherry Blossom 10-Mile Run is another annual race that began in 1973 and is conducted as part of the National Cherry Blossom Festival. The Army Ten-Miler, started in 1985, is the country's largest ten-mile race with over 26,000 participants; it is held each October and its course runs through Washington, D.C. and finishes at the Pentagon.

=== Volleyball ===
Washington, DC will be represented by a new professional women's volleyball team as part of Major League Volleyball beginning in 2027. The team name and home field for the team have yet to be announced.

=== Esports ===
The Washington Justice competed in the Overwatch League (OWL) as part of the West region. The team was founded in 2018 and ceased operation after the 2023 season.

The Washington Wizards host the Wizards District Gaming esports team as part of the NBA 2K League. Wizards District Gaming won the 5v5 championship in 2020 and 2021.

=== Quadball ===
The Washington Admirals has founded and joined in the league of Major League Quadball in 2015.

=== Ultimate ===
DC Shadow is a PUL professional women's ultimate team based in Washington, D.C. They joined the PUL as part of the 2020 expansion, but as a result of the league's decision to cancel the 2020 season due to the COVID-19 pandemic they did not compete in a full season until 2022. The team won back-to-back championships in 2025 and 2026.

== Sports media ==
The Washington, D.C. area's regional sports television network, Monumental Sports Network, is based in Washington. The Capitals and Wizards air their games on this network. The network also has shows focused on the Commanders.

The Commanders have a partnership with the classic rock radio station BIG 100.3.

Local sports talk radio stations include 106.7 The Fan, The Team 980, and ESPN 630 D.C. The Sports Junkies are among the most popular shows on The Fan, and they have covered local sports and culture in the D.C. area since 1996.

For decades, the primary print news source for local sports coverage was The Washington Post, whose sports section has been written by numerous award-winning journalists over the years, including Michael Wilbon, Tony Kornheiser, and John Feinstein. In 2026, the Post eliminated its sports section.

Washington, D.C. is also home to nationally televised sports shows, including the midnight edition of ESPN's SportsCenter, hosted by Scott Van Pelt, as well as ESPN's Pardon the Interruption, hosted by former Washington Post columnists Michael Wilbon and Tony Kornheiser. Previously, the city was home to ESPN's Around the Horn.

== Rivalries ==
=== New York City ===
The rivalry with the longest history between teams in each city is the rivalry between the New York Giants and the Washington Commanders in the National Football League (NFL). Both teams play in the Eastern division of the National Football Conference (known as the NFC East). The two teams therefore play against each other twice every regular season. Both teams are among the oldest and most successful in professional football, with the rivalry dating back to 1932. This matchup has included some of the game's greatest players and coaches throughout the decades.

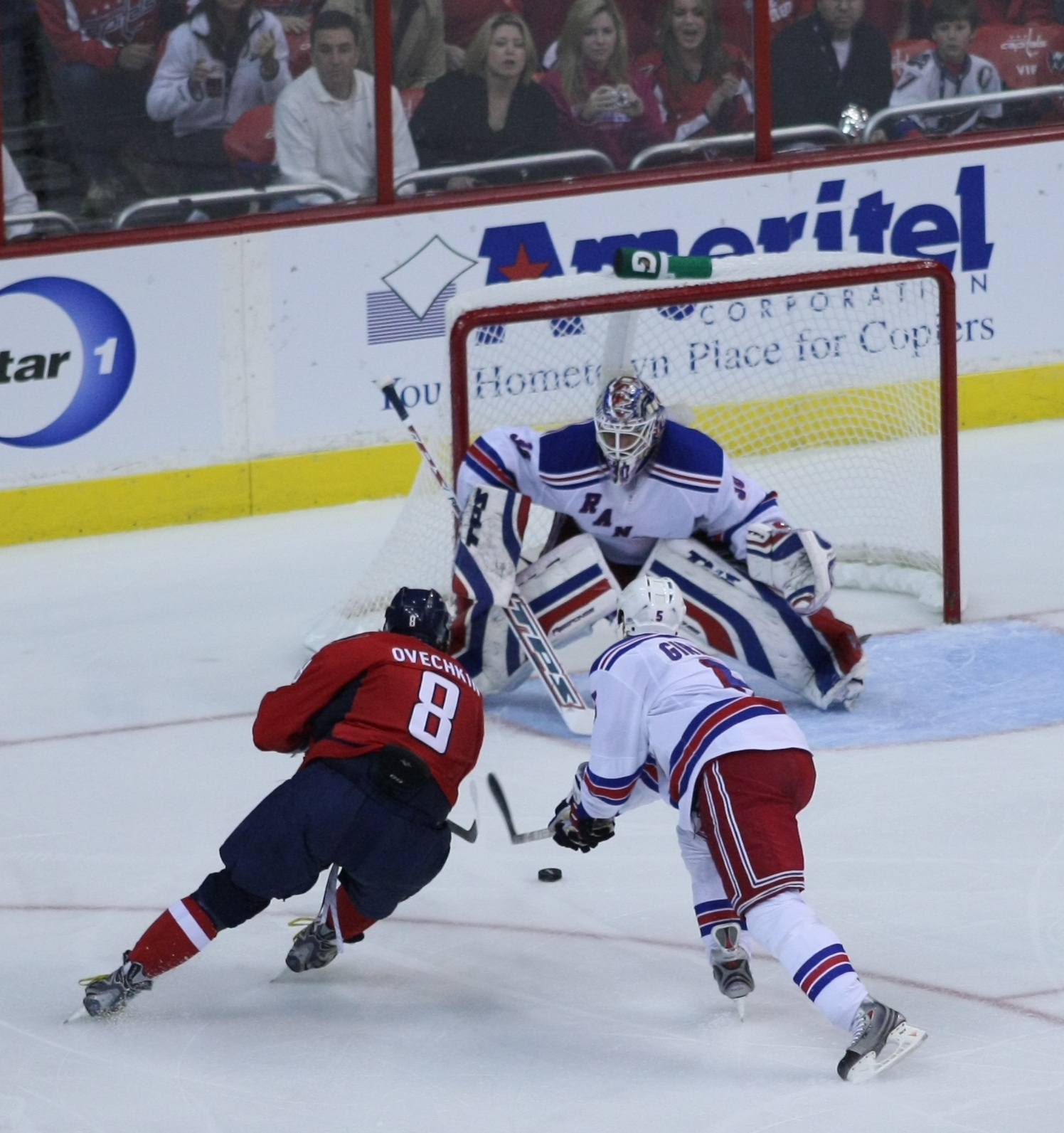
The Capitals playing against the New York Rangers in the 2009 Stanley Cup playoffs

In the National Hockey League (NHL), strong rivalries exist between the Washington Capitals and the New York Rangers, as well as the Capitals and the New York Islanders. All three compete in the Metropolitan Division of the Eastern Conference. Both the Capitals–Rangers rivalry and Capitals–Islanders rivalry have increased in intensity over the decades as a result of highly competitive playoff matchups, in addition to regular season encounters. Though not as historic and intense as the ones with the two New York-based teams, the New Jersey Devils also play in the Metropolitan Division and are therefore a division rival for the Capitals.

There is also a rivalry between the New York Red Bulls and D.C. United of Major League Soccer (MLS). The teams are among the oldest and most historic teams in the league. This rivalry dates back to 1996, the league's inaugural season. Both teams play in the Eastern Conference and have competed against each other in critical playoff matches over the years. Their rivalry is known as the Atlantic Cup, which is also the name of the trophy awarded to the team that wins the matchup.

The Washington Nationals and New York Mets of Major League Baseball (MLB) also share a rivalry. Though this rivalry has not existed for as long as the others between teams based in New York and Washington, the two compete in the NL East. This has helped a rivalry develop between the two teams in the years since the Nationals moved to Washington, D.C. in 2005.

=== Philadelphia ===
The rivalry between teams in Philadelphia and Washington, D.C. has been aided by the fact that the two cities have teams in the same division in the NFL, NHL, MLB, and MLS.

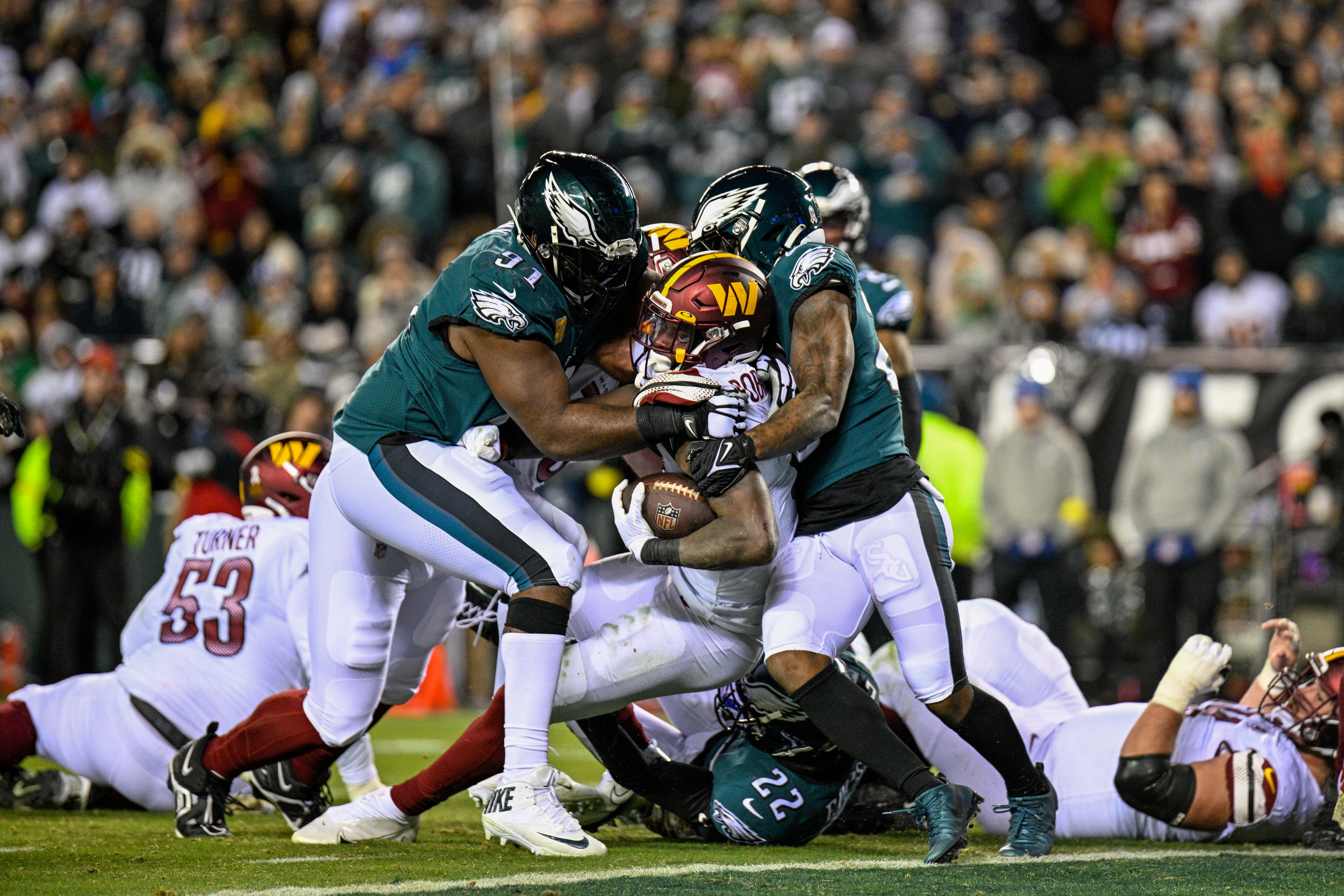
The Commanders and Eagles playing against each other in 2022

The Philadelphia Eagles and the Washington Commanders of the NFL have a long and historic rivalry, having (almost always) competed in the same division since 1933. Currently, both teams play in the NFC East and therefore play each other twice every regular season.

The Philadelphia Flyers and the Washington Capitals of the NHL both played in the Patrick Division during the 1980s and early 1990s, during which time the rivalry was extremely intense. Since 2013, both play in the Metropolitan Division of the Eastern Conference. The Capitals–Flyers rivalry has been intense both during the regular season as well as during the playoffs. The teams have met five times in the NHL playoffs. This rivalry dates back to 1974, when the Capitals joined the league.

Since the Nationals moved to Washington, D.C. in 2005, they have had a rivalry with the Philadelphia Phillies, as both compete in the NL East of the MLB. The Philadelphia Union of the MLS have developed an intraconference rivalry with D.C. United. The Washington Wizards and the Philadelphia 76ers both play in the NBA's Eastern Conference, and the two teams met in the NBA playoffs five times, most recently in 2021. They also met in 1971, when the current Washington franchise was based in Baltimore.

=== Baltimore ===
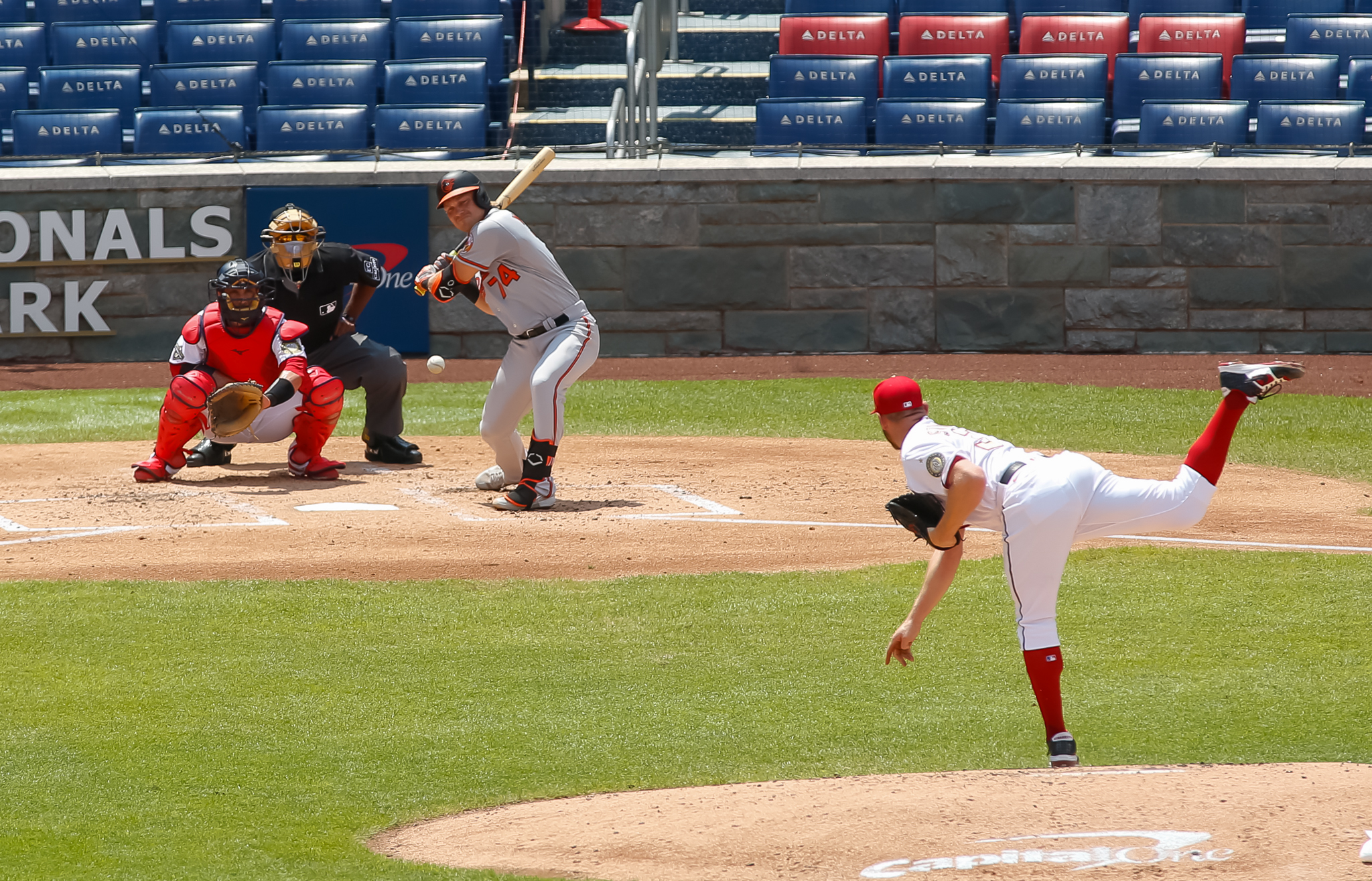
The Orioles and Nationals playing against each other in 2020

Due to the two cities' proximity to one another, historic and contemporary rivalries have existed between teams from both cities.

From 1972 to 2004, Washington did not have a baseball team; as a result, many baseball fans in the Washington area supported the nearby Baltimore Orioles, making them the de facto baseball team for Washington. When Washington was looking for a team, the ownership of the Orioles disapproved of the effort for fear that they would lose the Washington market to the new team. They were the only team to vote against moving the Montreal Expos to Washington. Therefore, when the Nationals began play in 2005, a natural rivalry was born between the new Washington team and the team that had historic support in the Washington region. This rivalry is known as the Beltway Series, or Battle of the Beltways, taken from the beltway highways, the Baltimore Beltway (I-695) and the Capital Beltway (I-495), that serve Baltimore and Washington, D.C., respectively. Given that the two teams play in different leagues (the Nationals play in the National League and the Orioles play in the American League), it is a rare interleague rivalry.

The Commanders and Baltimore Ravens of the NFL have a slight rivalry. Though because the two teams play in different conferences (the Commanders play in the National Football Conference and the Ravens play in the American Football Conference), they rarely play against each other in the regular season. However, there generally is a matchup between these two teams every preseason.

== See also ==
- Washington DC Sports Hall of Fame
- District of Columbia Interscholastic Athletic Association
- U.S. cities with teams from four major sports
