= Mike Reese =

Michael Reese or Mike Reese may refer to:

- Mike Reese (Pennsylvania politician) (1978–2021), American politician and member of the Pennsylvania House of Representatives
- Mike Reese (Louisiana politician), American politician and businessman from Louisiana
- Mike Reese (sheriff), American law enforcement officer and sheriff of Multnomah County, Oregon

== See also ==
- Michael Rees (disambiguation)
- Michael Reese Hospital
