= President's Export Council =

American government organization

The President's Export Council (PEC) is an American government organization that serves as the principal national advisory committee on international trade. The Council advises the president of the United States on policies and programs that affect U.S. trade performance; promotes export expansion; and provides a forum for discussing and resolving trade-related problems among the business, industrial, agricultural, labor, and government sectors. The Council reports to the president through the secretary of commerce. The under secretary of commerce for international trade serves as the Council's executive director. The current chairman is Mark Ein, who was appointed by Joe Biden in 2023.

The President's Export Council was created by executive order on December 20, 1973. The 28 private-sector members of the Council are appointed by the president. They serve with no set term of office. Five United States senators and five members of the House of Representatives are appointed to the Council by the president of the Senate and the speaker of the House, respectively. The secretaries of commerce, labor, agriculture, treasury, state, and homeland security; the chairman of the Export-Import Bank of the United States; the U.S. Trade Representative; and the administrator of the Small Business Administration are also members of the Council.

== See also ==
- United States Department of Commerce
