= Michael Rees (businessman) =

American private equity businessman

- Born: 1974 or 1975 (age 51–52); Pittsburgh, Pennsylvania, US
- Education: University of Pittsburgh; Massachusetts Institute of Technology
- Occupations: Businessman, Private Equity
- Title: Co-founder and co-president of Blue Owl Capital
- Spouse: Allison Rees
- Children: 2

Michael Rees (born 1974 or 1975) is an American billionaire private equity businessman, and a co-founder and co-president of Blue Owl Capital.

Rees was born in Pittsburgh, Pennsylvania. Rees earned a bachelor's degree in engineering from the University of Pittsburgh, and a master's degree from the Massachusetts Institute of Technology. He was a member of the Sigma Chi fraternity.

He joined Lehman Brothers in 2001. Rees founded Dyal Capital, based on the names of his children, Dylan and Alexia. He became a billionaire in 2021.

As of September 2024, Forbes estimated his net worth at US$1.8 billion.

Rees is married to Allison, they have two children, and live in New Canaan, Connecticut. In 2023, they donated $3 million to the New Canaan Library, and the Children's Room was renamed The Rees Family Children's Library. In 2026, they donated $25 million to establish the Vanderbilt Undergraduate Center for Finance.
