= Blue Owl Capital =

American alternative asset management firm

Blue Owl Capital Inc.
- Type: Public
- Traded as: NYSE: OWL (Class A); Russell 1000 component
- Industry: Financial services
- Founded: May 19, 2021; 5 years ago
- Founders: Doug Ostrover; Marc Lipschultz; Michael Rees; Craig Packer
- Headquarters: 399 Park Avenue, New York City, United States
- Products: Private equity; Private equity real estate; Private credit
- Revenue: ▲US$2.9 billion (2025)
- Net income: ▼US$78.8 million (2025)
- AUM: ▲US$307.5 billion (2025)
- Total assets: ▲US$12.5 billion (2025)
- Total equity: ▲US$15.2 billion (2025)
- Number of employees: 1,365 (2025)
- Website: blueowl.com
- Footnotes; Financials as of December 31, 2025.

Blue Owl Capital Inc. is an American alternative investment asset management company that is listed on the New York Stock Exchange under the ticker symbol: "OWL". Headquartered in New York City, it has additional offices around the world, including London, Dubai, and Hong Kong.

== History ==
Dyal Capital was formed in 2011 by Michael Rees. It provided financing to hedge funds and private equity firms by acquiring minority interests in them.

Owl Rock Capital Group was founded in 2016. It was a middle market private credit direct lending firm that dealt with credit investments.

In December 2020, it was announced there would be a merger between Dyal Capital Partners and Owl Rock. The two firms combined with a special-purpose acquisition company, Altimar Acquisition Corp to form Blue Owl.

In May 2021, the transaction was completed, and Blue Owl was listed on the New York Stock Exchange (NYSE). The deal was valued at $12.2 billion which included a $1.5 billion commitment from investors such as ICONIQ Capital, Federated Hermes and Liberty Mutual.

In October 2021, Blue Owl acquired Oak Street, a private equity real estate firm for $950 million.

In December 2021, Blue Owl acquired Ascentium Group, a business development office based in Hong Kong. This was done as part of its plans to expand in Asia.

In October 2022, Bloomberg reported that Blue Owl intended to expand its offices in Greenwich, Connecticut and had opened an office in New Jersey.

In July 2024, the firm agreed to purchase a private credit firm, Atalaya Capital Management.

In October 2025, Meta Platforms, Inc formed a $27 Billion joint venture with Blue Owl for the development of a Hyperion data center for AI in Richland Parish, Louisiana.

In November 2025, Blue Owl announced an agreement for merging its private fund Blue Owl Capital Corporation II ("OBDC II") but later called off the merger after facing revolt from investors and falling stock price.

In February 2026, Blue Owl announced it would permanently restrict investor withdrawals from its primary private retail debt fund, Blue Owl Capital Corp II. At the same time, the firm sold $1.4 billion in credit assets, representing 30% of its credit assets, to maintain liquidity for its investors.
