= Mark Ein =

American businessman (born 1964)

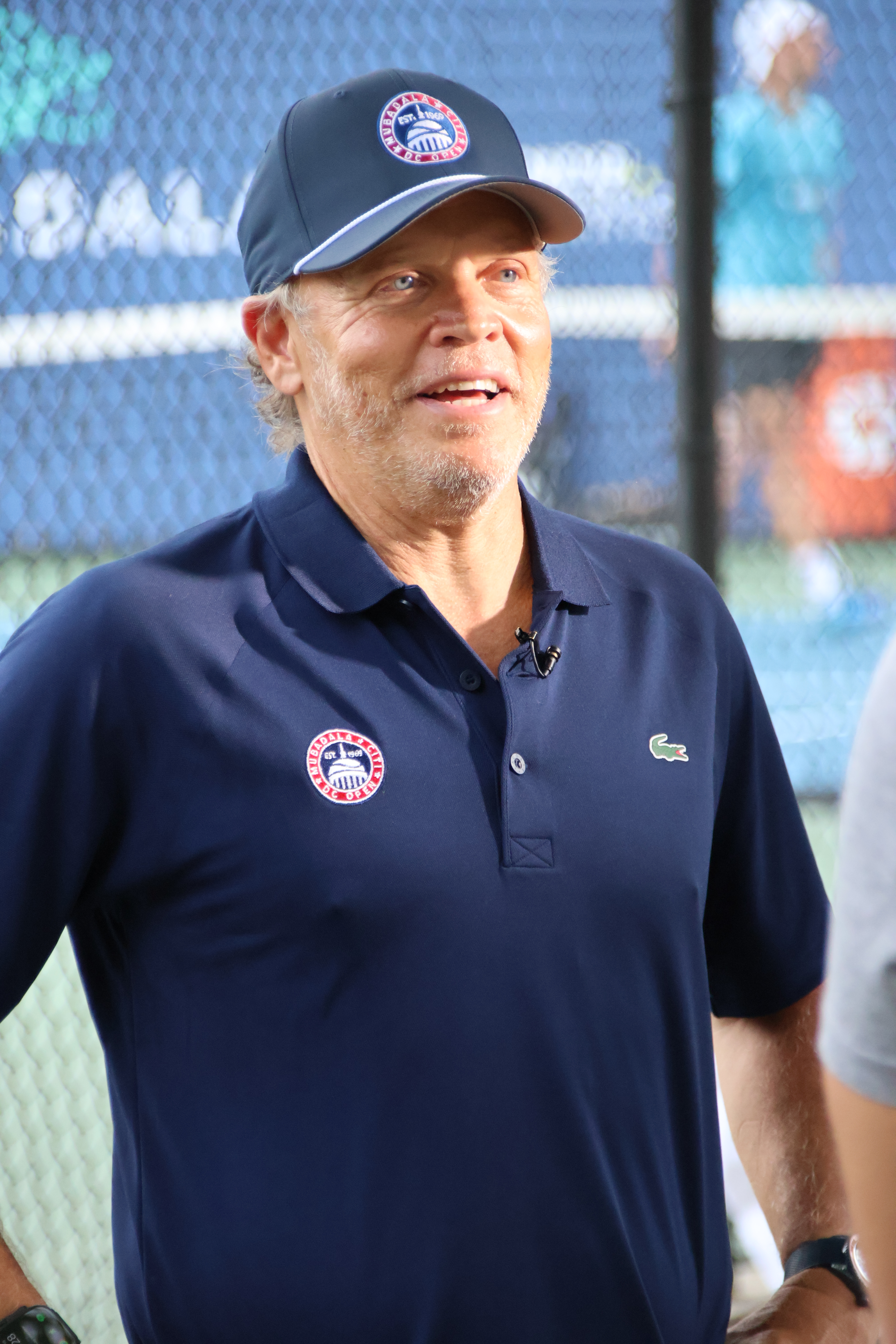
- Ein at the 2025 DC Open
- Born: Mark David Ein; December 31, 1964 (age 61); Chevy Chase, Maryland, U.S.
- Education: University of Pennsylvania (BS); Harvard University (MBA)
- Occupations: Venture capitalist; sports entrepreneur
- Organizations: Federal City Council; World Economic Forum; Gridiron Club; President's Export Council
- Title: Owner; Washington Kastles (WTT); Washington City Paper; CEO; Venturehouse Group; Capitol Investment; DC Open; Limited partner; Washington Commanders (NFL)
- Board member of: Kastle Systems; United States Tennis Association (USTA)
- Spouse: Sally Stiebel (m. 2013)
- Awards: Key to D.C.; Mid-Atlantic Tennis Hall of Fame; Outstanding Public Service in Professional Sports; Washington Business Hall of Fame

Mark David Ein (born December 31, 1964) is an American venture capitalist and sports entrepreneur. He is a limited partner of the National Football League (NFL) team Washington Commanders and is an investment partner in the English football club Leeds United and the Major League Baseball (MLB) team Baltimore Orioles. Ein founded the World TeamTennis (WTT) team Washington Kastles in 2008 and has chaired the DC Open tournament since 2019. He also owns the Washington City Paper, serves as chairman of the President's Export Council, and is a member of the Federal City Council, World Economic Forum, and Gridiron Club.

== Early life ==
Ein was born on December 31, 1964, in Chevy Chase, Maryland. He earned a degree in economics from the Wharton School in 1987 and an MBA from Harvard Business School in 1992. Ein is a member of the Phi Delta Theta fraternity.

== Career ==
Ein worked for The Carlyle Group, Brentwood Associates, and Goldman Sachs before founding Venturehouse Group in 1999. A lifelong enthusiast of tennis, Ein founded the Washington Kastles of World TeamTennis (WTT) in 2008 and is a board member of the United States Tennis Association (USTA). He earned an ATP ranking of 1098 at age 46 after playing in a few ATP doubles tennis tournaments. Ein bought the Washington City Paper in 2017 and became chairman and CEO of the DC Open tennis tournament in 2019. He is the chairman of the board for Kastle Systems, a security company, and CEO of Capitol Investment Corp. Ein founded the Washington Justice of the esports Overwatch League in 2018. Ein became a Washington Business Hall of Fame laureate in 2018.

In 2023, president Joe Biden appointed Ein to chair the President's Export Council, a group within the International Trade Administration that serves as a national trade advisory committee. He is also a member of the Federal City Council, World Economic Forum, and the Gridiron Club. The same year, he was a part of an investment group led by Josh Harris that bought the Washington Commanders of the National Football League (NFL) for $6.05 billion. He and Harris have been close friends since elementary school; they attended Wharton and Harvard Business School together and shared beach houses during their time on Wall Street. Ein became an investment partner in the English football club Leeds United in May 2024 and the Baltimore Orioles of Major League Baseball (MLB) in September 2025.

Notable properties owned
Team	Notes
Washington Kastles	World TeamTennis team
Washington City Paper	Alternative newspaper
Washington Justice	Overwatch League team; league folded in 2023
DC Open	Tennis tournament; chairman and CEO
Washington Commanders	National Football League team; limited partner

== Personal life ==
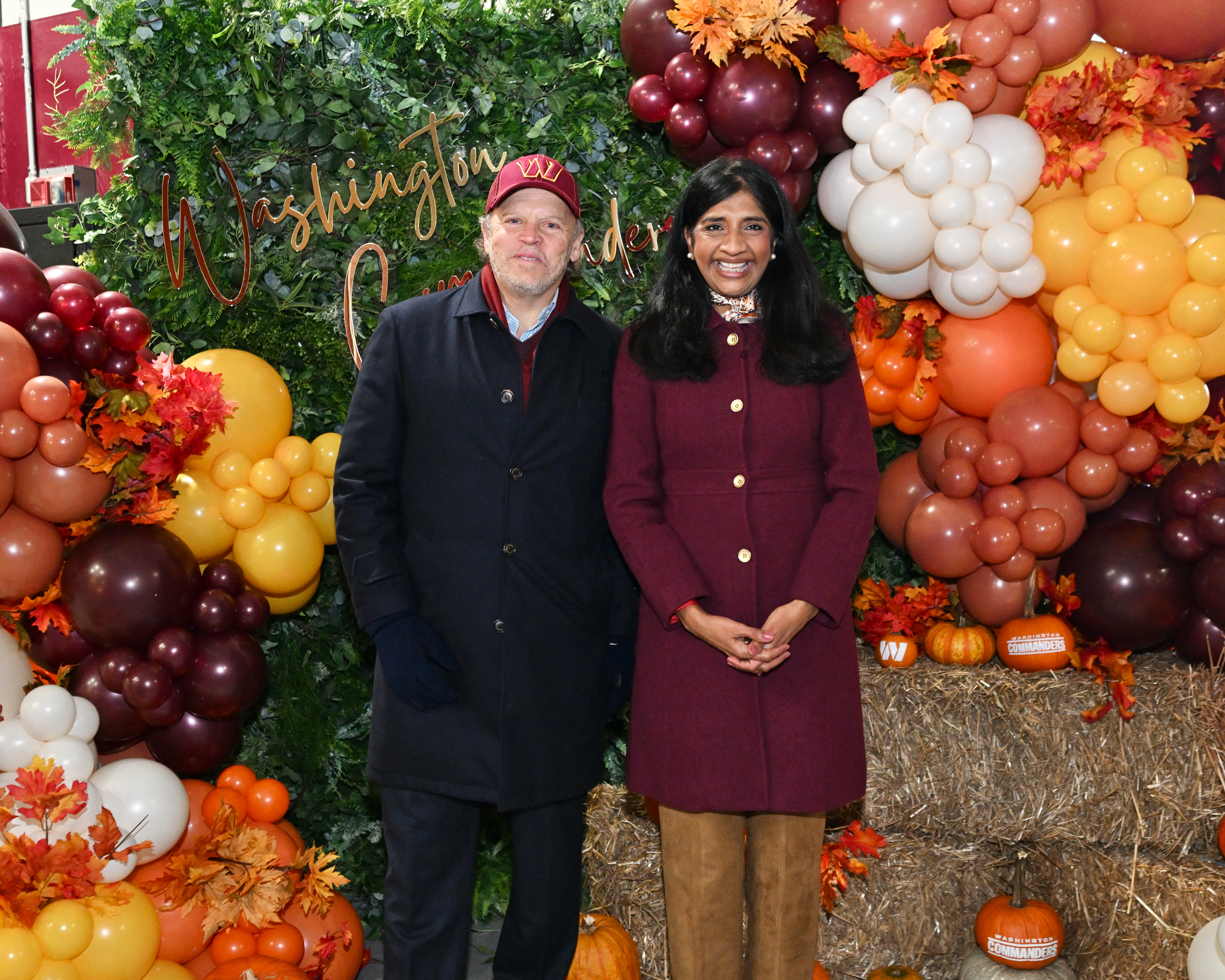
Ein with Maryland lieutenant governor Aruna Miller at a Washington Commanders charity event for Thanksgiving, 2023

Ein is Jewish; his mother is a Holocaust survivor. He was an executive producer of the 2008 documentary film Kicking It. In 2001, he purchased the home of Katharine Graham in the Georgetown district of Washington, D.C. for $8 million following her death. He never resided in it and put up for sale in 2024.

Ein married Sally Stiebel in September 2013. The wedding included a live performance of Y.M.C.A. by the Village People and was attended by over 350 guests, including Mark Warner, Ted Leonsis, Raul Fernandez, Vernon Jordan, Valerie Jarrett, Debra Lee, Gene Sperling, Larry Summers, David Bradley, Adrian Fenty, Jack Evans, Murphy Jensen, Sam Kass, and Mitchell Rales. They spent their honeymoon at Lake Como in Italy and reside in Georgetown.

In 2009, D.C. mayor Adrian Fenty presented Ein with the key to the city for his success with the Washington Kastles. He was inducted into the USTA Mid-Atlantic Tennis Hall of Fame in 2012 and received the "Outstanding Public Service in Professional Sports" award by the Jefferson Awards Foundation in 2013.
