= 2026 Major League Cricket season =

Fourth season of Major League Cricket

2026 Major League Cricket
- Tournament logo
- Dates: June 18 – July 18, 2026
- Administrator(s): American Cricket Enterprises; USA Cricket
- Cricket format: Twenty20
- Tournament format(s): Double round-robin and playoffs
- Champions: Los Angeles Knight Riders (1st title)
- Runners-up: Washington Freedom
- Participants: 6
- Matches: 34
- Player of the series: Sunil Narine (Los Angeles Knight Riders)
- Most runs: Andries Gous (Washington Freedom) (547)
- Most wickets: Sunil Narine (Los Angeles Knight Riders) (18); Ottniel Baartman (Seattle Orcas) (18); Andre Russell (Los Angeles Knight Riders) (18)
- Official website: Major League Cricket

The 2026 Major League Cricket (also known as MLC 2026, or for sponsorship reasons as 2026 Cognizant Major League Cricket) was the fourth season of Major League Cricket, a franchise Twenty20 cricket league established in 2019 by American Cricket Enterprises (ACE) in the United States. The tournament was played from June 18 to July 18, 2026.

MI New York were the defending champions and were beaten in the playoffs by Washington Freedom, who went on to reach the final. The Los Angeles Knight Riders won their first Major League Cricket title, defeating Washington Freedom by 1 run in the final, with Sunil Narine named both player of the match and player of the tournament for the 2026 season.

== Background ==
American Cricket Enterprises confirmed the fourth season ran from June 18 to July 18, 2026. Season 3 set new records for ticket sales (up 53% year-on-year), broadcast reach (global carriage to 90+ countries), and digital engagement, with 84% of ticket purchasers being first-time buyers at MLC games.

The full schedule for the fourth season was announced on March 20, 2026. The season again featured a double round-robin league format of 30 matches, followed by four playoff matches, for a total of 34 matches — matching the 2025 season's total.

A new venue, the Knight Riders Cricket Field at Fairplex in Pomona, California, was added to the tournament for the first time, replacing Broward County Stadium in Lauderhill, Florida. The Oakland Coliseum hosted the championship final on July 18, 2026.

== Teams ==
All six teams from the previous season took part this season.

Teams in the 2026 Major League Cricket
Franchise	Captain	Head coach
Los Angeles Knight Riders	Jason Holder	Dwayne Bravo
MI New York	Nicholas Pooran	Mark Boucher
San Francisco Unicorns	Matthew Short	Cameron White
Seattle Orcas	Marcus Stoinis	Adam Voges
Texas Super Kings	Faf du Plessis	Stephen Fleming
Washington Freedom	Steve Smith	Ricky Ponting

== Squads ==
Each team was allowed to select their domestic players.

Los Angeles Knight Riders	MI New York	San Francisco Unicorns	Seattle Orcas	Texas Super Kings	Washington Freedom
Jason Holder (c); Alex Hales; Andre Fletcher; Rovman Powell; Colin Munro; Andre Russell; Sunil Narine; Lloyd Pope; Shadley van Schalkwyk; Unmukt Chand; Ali Khan; Saif Badar; Kartikh Gatepalli; Matthew Tromp; Carmi le Roux; Jahmar Hamilton; Nitish Kumar; Kristopher Ramsaran	Nicholas Pooran (c); Kieron Pollard; Quinton de Kock; Ryan Rickelton; Shakib Al Hasan; Trent Boult; Corbin Bosch; Romario Shepherd; Tristan Luus; Allah Ghazanfar; Corey Anderson; Monank Patel; Tajinder Singh; Ehsan Adil; Nosthush Kenjige; Agni Chopra; Rushil Ugarkar; Kunwarjeet Singh; Sunny Patel; Faisal Ahmadzai	Matthew Short (c); Finn Allen; ~~Cooper Connolly~~; Aaron Hardie; Lhuan-dre Pretorius; Xavier Bartlett; Haris Rauf; Oliver Peake; Ravichandran Ashwin; Hassan Khan; Brody Couch; Sanjay Krishnamurthi; Hammad Azam; Juanoy Drysdale; Aakarshit Gomel; Zia Ul-Haq; Mohammad Ilyas; Anirudh Immanuel; Saideep Ganesh	Marcus Stoinis (c); Tim Seifert; Shimron Hetmyer; Dasun Shanaka; Matthew Breetzke; Tim Robinson; Lungi Ngidi; Ottniel Baartman; Tanveer Sangha; ~~Jason Behrendorff~~; Harmeet Singh; Ayan Desai; Rahul Jariwala; Shayan Jahangir; Jessy Singh; Ali Sheikh; Cameron Gannon; ~~Raymon Reifer~~; Sujit Nayak; Shehan Jayasuriya; Sharad Lumba	Faf du Plessis (c); Donovan Ferreira; Wiaan Mulder; Rilee Rossouw; Adam Milne; Nandre Burger; Keshav Maharaj; Akeal Hosein; Hardus Viljoen; Shubham Ranjane; Joshua Tromp; Milind Kumar; Saiteja Mukkamalla; Mohammad Mohsin; Calvin Savage; Smit Patel; Amshi de Silva; Abhimanyu Lamba	Steve Smith (c); Glenn Maxwell; Mitchell Owen; Lockie Ferguson; Marco Jansen; Jack Edwards; Rachin Ravindra; Mark Chapman; Ben Dwarshuis; Andries Gous; Saurabh Netravalkar; Obus Pienaar; Nikhil Chaudhary; Mukhtar Ahmed; Ian Holland; Lahiru Milantha; Amila Aponso; Abhishek Paradkar; Yasir Mohammad; Asif Mehmood

== Venues ==
Matches were held at three venues: Grand Prairie's Grand Prairie Stadium, Oakland's Oakland Coliseum, and Pomona's Knight Riders Cricket Ground at Fairplex. This was the first tournament in which games were held at the Knight Riders Cricket Ground at Fairplex; the Oakland Coliseum also hosted the playoff matches and the championship final for the first time.

A map of the United States with pin-points on 2026 Major League Cricket venues
Grand Prairie	Oakland	Pomona
Grand Prairie Stadium	Oakland Coliseum	Knight Riders Cricket Ground
Capacity: 7,200	Capacity: 12,000	Capacity: 5,000
Matches: 15	Matches: 12	Matches: 7
Grand Prairie Stadium in 2024	Oakland Coliseum in 2024	Knight Riders Cricket Ground in 2026

== Points table ==
Pos	Team	Pld	W	L	NR	Pts	NRR	Qualification
1	San Francisco Unicorns (3rd)	10	6	4	0	12	0.487	Advanced to Qualifier
2	Los Angeles Knight Riders (C)	10	6	4	0	12	0.245	Advanced to Qualifier
3	Washington Freedom (R)	10	6	4	0	12	−0.399	Advanced to Eliminator
4	MI New York (4th)	10	5	5	0	10	−0.165	Advanced to Eliminator
5	Seattle Orcas	10	4	6	0	8	0.034	Eliminated
6	Texas Super Kings	10	3	7	0	6	−0.151	Eliminated

Source: ESPNCricinfo
(C) Champions; (R) Runners-up

=== Match summary ===
Team	Group matches										Playoffs		
Team	1	2	3	4	5	6	7	8	9	10	Q/E	C	F
Los Angeles Knight Riders	2	4	4	4	4	6	6	8	10	12	W		W
MI New York	0	2	2	4	6	8	8	8	10	10	L		
San Francisco Unicorns	0	2	2	4	6	6	8	10	10	12	L	L	
Seattle Orcas	0	2	2	4	4	6	6	8	8	8			
Texas Super Kings	2	2	2	4	6	6	6	6	6	6			
Washington Freedom	0	2	2	4	4	6	8	8	10	12	W	W	L

Win	Loss	No result

- Note: The total points at the end of each group match are listed.
- Note: Click on the points (group matches) or W/L (playoffs) to see the match summary.

Visitor team →	LAKR	MINY	SFU	SO	TSK	WF
Home team ↓	LAKR	MINY	SFU	SO	TSK	WF
Los Angeles Knight Riders		New York; 6 wickets	Los Angeles; 7 wickets	Seattle; 20 runs	Los Angeles; 6 wickets	Washington; 6 wickets
MI New York	New York; 41 runs		San Francisco; 9 wickets	New York; 17 runs	Texas; 6 wickets	Washington; 5 wickets
San Francisco Unicorns	Los Angeles; 11 runs	San Francisco; 5 wickets		San Francisco; 2 wickets	Texas; 22 runs	San Francisco; 8 wickets
Seattle Orcas	Los Angeles; 81 runs	New York; 5 runs	San Francisco; 6 wickets		Seattle; 9 runs	Seattle; 5 wickets
Texas Super Kings	Los Angeles; 6 wickets	New York; 8 wickets	San Francisco; 7 wickets	Texas; 6 wickets		Washington; 3 wickets
Washington Freedom	Los Angeles; 18 runs	Washington; 30 runs	Washington; 5 wickets	Seattle; 88 runs	Washington; 1 wicket	

Home team won	Visitor team won

- Note: Results listed are according to the home (horizontal) and visitor (vertical) teams.
- Note: Click on a result to see a summary of the match.

== League stage ==
=== Round 1 (Grand Prairie) ===
Match 1
June 18, 2026
19:30 (D/N)
Scorecard

Seattle Orcas; 220/2 (20 Overs)	v	Texas Super Kings; 221/4 (18.3 overs)
Tim Seifert 104 (66); Adam Milne 1/41 (4 overs)		Faf du Plessis 113* (52); Marcus Stoinis 1/15 (1.5 overs)

Texas Super Kings won by 6 wickets
Grand Prairie Stadium, Grand Prairie
Umpires: Leslie Reifer (WI) and Rushane Samuels (WI)
Player of the match: Faf du Plessis (Texas Super Kings)

- Texas Super Kings won the toss elected to field.
- Faf du Plessis (Texas Super Kings) became the first batter to scored 1,000 runs in the MLC.
- This was Texas Super Kings' highest successful run chase in the MLC.

Match 2
June 19, 2026
15:30
Scorecard

San Francisco Unicorns; 150/7 (14 overs)	v	Los Angeles Knight Riders; 154/3 (13.4 overs)
Lhuan-dre Pretorius 54 (28); Sunil Narine 2/33 (3 overs)		Colin Munro 64* (40); Peter Siddle 2/27 (3 overs)

Los Angeles Knight Riders won by 7 wickets
Grand Prairie Stadium, Grand Prairie
Umpires: Gregory Brathwaite (WI) and Christopher Taylor (WI)
Player of the match: Colin Munro (Los Angeles Knight Riders)

- Los Angeles Knight Riders won the toss elected to field.
- The match was reduced to 14 overs per side due to rain.

Match 3
June 19, 2026
19:30 (D/N)
Scorecard

Washington Freedom; 216 (20 overs)	v	Seattle Orcas; 219/5 (17.4 overs)
Mitchell Owen 61 (25); Ottneil Baartman 4/33 (4 overs)		Tim Seifert 78 (33); Ian Holland 2/20 (3.4 overs)

Seattle Orcas won by 5 wickets
Grand Prairie Stadium, Grand Prairie
Umpires: Vijaya Mallela (USA) and Leslie Reifer (WI)
Player of the match: Ottneil Baartman (Seattle Orcas)

- Seattle Orcas won the toss and elected to field.

Match 4
June 20, 2026
15:30
Scorecard

Texas Super Kings; 152/9 (20 overs)	v	San Francisco Unicorns; 153/3 (17.5 overs)
Rilee Rossouw 36 (29); Peter Siddle 3/36 (4 overs)		Lhuan-dre Pretorius 69* (55); Nandre Burger 1/13 (2 overs)

San Francisco Unicorns won by 7 wickets
Grand Prairie Stadium, Grand Prairie
Umpires: Gregory Brathwaite (WI) and Jermaine Lindo (USA)
Player of the match: Lhuan-dre Pretorius (San Francisco Unicorns)

- San Francisco Unicorns won the toss and elected to field.

Match 5
June 20, 2026
19:30 (D/N)
Scorecard

Washington Freedom; 245/5 (20 overs)	v	MI New York; 215/6 (20 overs)
Mitchell Owen 155 (68); Corey Anderson 1/27 (2 overs)		Kieron Pollard 100* (56); Glenn Maxwell 2/37 (4 overs)

Washington Freedom won by 30 runs
Grand Prairie Stadium, Grand Prairie
Umpires: Vijaya Mallela (USA) and Rushane Samuels (WI)
Player of the match: Mitchell Owen (Washington Freedom)

- MI New York won the toss and elected to field.

Match 6
June 21, 2026
15:30
Scorecard

Los Angeles Knight Riders; 196 (20 overs)	v	Seattle Orcas; 115 (15.3 overs)
Andre Fletcher 40 (27); Jessy Singh 3/29 (4 overs)		Harmeet Singh 25 (17); Andre Russell 3/8 (1.3 overs)

Los Angeles Knight Riders won by 81 runs
Grand Prairie Stadium, Grand Prairie
Umpires: Jermaine Lindo (USA) and Christopher Taylor (WI)
Player of the match: Shadley van Schalkwyk (Los Angeles Knight Riders)

- Seattle Orcas won the toss and elected to field.

Match 7
June 21, 2026
19:30 (D/N)
Scorecard

Texas Super Kings; 158 (19.2 overs)	v	MI New York; 162/2 (17.4 overs)
Shubham Ranjane 49 (36); Corbin Bosch 4/29 (4 overs)		Nicholas Pooran 68* (46); Amshi de Silva 1/29 (3 overs)

MI New York won by 8 wickets
Grand Prairie Stadium, Grand Prairie
Umpires: Leslie Reifer (WI) and Rushane Samuels (WI)
Player of the match: Corbin Bosch (MI New York)

- MI New York won the toss and elected to field.

=== Round 2 (Oakland) ===
Match 8
June 24, 2026
18:30 (D/N)
Scorecard

Texas Super Kings; 161/8 (20 overs)	v	San Francisco Unicorns; 139 (17.4 overs)
Donovan Ferreira 45 (28); Ghulam Mudassar 2/30 (4 overs)		Matthew Short 28 (16); Amshi de Silva 4/28 (4 overs)

Texas Super Kings won by 22 runs
Oakland Coliseum, Oakland
Umpires: Gregory Brathwaite (WI) and Christopher Taylor (WI)
Player of the match: Amshi de Silva (Texas Super Kings)

- San Francisco Unicorns won the toss and elected to field.

Match 9
June 25, 2026
18:30 (D/N)
Scorecard

Seattle Orcas; 227/6 (20 overs)	v	Washington Freedom; 139 (16.2 overs)
Shimron Hetmyer 79* (33); Marco Jansen 3/33 (4 overs)		Amila Aponso 31* (13); Jessy Singh 5/24 (4 overs)

Seattle Orcas won by 88 runs
Oakland Coliseum, Oakland
Umpires: Vijaya Mallela (USA) and Leslie Reifer (WI)
Player of the match: Jessy Singh (Seattle Orcas)

- Washington Freedom won the toss and elected to field.
- Jessy Singh (Seattle Orcas) took his maiden five-wicket haul in T20s.

Match 10
June 26, 2026
14:30
Scorecard

MI New York; 127/9 (20 overs)	v	Texas Super Kings; 132/4 (19 overs)
Sunny Patel 26* (24); Donovan Ferreira 3/14 (4 overs)		Saiteja Mukkamalla 38 (37); Rushil Ugarkar 2/16 (4 overs)

Texas Super Kings won by 6 wickets
Oakland Coliseum, Oakland
Umpires: Gregory Brathwaite (WI) and Jermaine Lindo (USA)
Player of the match: Donovan Ferreira (Texas Super Kings)

- Texas Super Kings won the toss and elected to field.

Match 11
June 26, 2026
18:30 (D/N)
Scorecard

Seattle Orcas; 191 (19.2 overs)	v	San Francisco Unicorns; 192/8 (19.4 overs)
Shayan Jahangir 62 (25); Brody Couch 3/41 (4 overs)		Lhuan-dre Pretorius 87 (39); Marcus Stoinis 2/29 (4 overs)

San Francisco Unicorns won by 2 wickets
Oakland Coliseum, Oakland
Umpires: Vijaya Mallela (USA) and Rushane Samuels (WI)
Player of the match: Brody Couch (San Francisco Unicorns)

- Seattle Orcas won the toss and elected to bat.

Match 12
June 27, 2026
14:30
Scorecard

MI New York; 144/6 (20 overs)	v	Los Angeles Knight Riders; 103 (17.5 overs)
Nicholas Pooran 70* (58); Andre Russell 4/35 (4 overs)		Andre Fletcher 44 (40); Nosthush Kenjige 3/21 (4 overs)

MI New York won by 41 runs
Oakland Coliseum, Oakland
Umpires: Jermaine Lindo (USA) and Christopher Taylor (WI)
Player of the match: Nicholas Pooran (MI New York)

- Los Angeles Knight Riders won the toss and elected to field.

Match 13
June 27, 2026
18:30 (D/N)
Scorecard

Texas Super Kings; 185/4 (20 overs)	v	Washington Freedom; 187/9 (20 overs)
Donovan Ferreira 44* (20); Nikhil Chaudhary 2/29 (4 overs)		Mitchell Owen 77 (35); Akeal Hosein 4/36 (4 overs)

Washington Freedom won by 1 wicket
Oakland Coliseum, Oakland
Umpires: Leslie Reifer (WI) and Rushane Samuels (WI)
Player of the match: Nikhil Chaudhary (Washington Freedom)

- Texas Super Kings won the toss and elected to bat.
- Akeal Hosein (Texas Super Kings) became the first bowler to take a hat-trick in MLC.

Match 14
June 28, 2026
14:30
Scorecard

Seattle Orcas; 154/7 (20 overs)	v	Los Angeles Knight Riders; 134/8 (20 overs)
Dasun Shanaka 58* (23); Sunil Narine 2/17 (4 overs)		Colin Munro 33 (36); Marcus Stoinis 3/28 (4 overs)

Seattle won by 20 runs
Oakland Coliseum, Oakland
Umpires: Gregory Brathwaite (WI) and Christopher Taylor (WI)
Player of the match: Dasun Shanaka (Seattle Orcas)

- Seattle Orcas won the toss and elected to bat.

Match 15
June 28, 2026
18:30 (D/N)
Scorecard

Washington Freedom; 190/4 (20 overs)	v	San Francisco Unicorns; 193/2 (20 overs)
Andries Gous 83* (50); Matthew Short 1/12 (2 overs)		Lhuan-dre Pretorius 66 (26); Nikhil Chaudhary 1/29 (4 overs)

San Francisco Unicorns won by 8 wickets
Oakland Coliseum, Oakland
Umpires: Vijaya Mallela (USA) and Leslie Reifer (WI)
Player of the match: Lhuan-dre Pretorius (San Francisco Unicorns)

- Washington Freedom won the toss and elected to bat.

=== Round 3 (Pomona) ===
Match 16
July 1, 2026
18:30 (D/N)
Scorecard

Los Angeles Knight Riders; 108 (17.5 overs)	v	Washington Freedom; 110/4 (17.1 overs)
Rovman Powell 30 (19); Saurabh Netravalkar 3/16 (4 overs)		Steve Smith 40* (44); Sunil Narine 2/25 (4 overs)

Washington Freedom won by 6 wickets
Knight Riders Cricket Ground, Pomona
Umpires: Gregory Brathwaite (WI) and Rushane Samuels (WI)
Player of the match: Saurabh Netravalkar (Washington Freedom)

- Los Angeles Knight Riders won the toss and elected to bat.
- This was the first MLC match to be played at the Knight Riders Cricket Ground at Fairplex, Pomona.

Match 17
July 2, 2026
18:30 (D/N)
Scorecard

MI New York; 132/8 (20 overs)	v	Seattle Orcas; 127/9 (20 overs)
Quinton de Kock 61 (46); Marcus Stoinis 3/14 (4 overs)		Marcus Stoinis 36 (31); Romario Shepherd 3/16 (4 overs)

MI New York won by 5 runs
Knight Riders Cricket Ground, Pomona
Umpires: Wayne Knights (NZ) and Jermaine Lindo (USA)
Player of the match: Romario Shepherd (MI New York)

- Seattle Orcas won the toss and elected to field.

Match 18
July 3, 2026
18:30 (D/N)
Scorecard

Texas Super Kings; 173/5 (20 overs)	v	Los Angeles Knight Riders; 175/4 (18.4 overs)
Saiteja Mukkamalla 80 (55); Sunil Narine 2/22 (4 overs)		Rovman Powell 73 (27); Donovan Ferreira 1/18 (3 overs)

Los Angeles Knight Riders won by 6 wickets
Knight Riders Cricket Ground, Pomona
Umpires: Gregory Brathwaite (WI) and Christopher Taylor (WI)
Player of the match: Rovman Powell (Los Angeles Knight Riders)

- Los Angeles Knight Riders won the toss and elected to field.

Match 19
July 4, 2026
14:30
Scorecard

San Francisco Unicorns; 126 (19.3 overs)	v	Washington Freedom; 129/5 (18.1 overs)
Matthew Short 39 (34); Jack Edwards 4/13 (3.3 overs)		Steve Smith 56 (49); Brody Couch 2/24 (4 overs)

Washington Freedom won by 5 wickets
Knight Riders Cricket Ground, Pomona
Umpires: Jermaine Lindo (USA) and Vijaya Mallela (USA)
Player of the match: Jack Edwards (Washington Freedom)

- Washington Freedom won the toss and elected to field.
- Anirudh Immanuel (San Francisco Unicorns) made his T20 debut.

Match 20
July 4, 2026
18:30 (D/N)
Scorecard

Los Angeles Knight Riders; 165/6 (20 overs)	v	MI New York; 168/4 (19.5 overs)
Matthew Tromp 44 (36); Corbin Bosch 3/19 (4 overs)		Kieron Pollard 63* (35); Carmi le Roux 2/39 (3.5 overs)

MI New York won by 6 wickets
Knight Riders Cricket Ground, Pomona
Umpires: Rushane Samuels (WI) and Christopher Taylor (WI)
Player of the match: Kieron Pollard (MI New York)

- MI New York won the toss and elected to field.

Match 21
July 5, 2026
14:30
Scorecard

Seattle Orcas; 121/9 (20 overs)	v	Texas Super Kings; 112/9 (20 overs)
Cameron Gannon 20 (21); Amshi de Silva 3/15 (4 overs)		Shubham Ranjane 40* (44); Dasun Shanaka 4/26 (4 overs)

Seattle Orcas won by 9 runs
Knight Riders Cricket Ground, Pomona
Umpires: Wayne Knights (NZ) and Vijaya Mallela (USA)
Player of the match: Dasun Shanaka (Seattle Orcas)

- Texas Super Kings won the toss and elected to field.
- Dasun Shanaka (Seattle Orcas) became the first bowler to take a double hat-trick in MLC.

Match 22
July 5, 2026
18:30 (D/N)
Scorecard

MI New York; 104 (20 overs)	v	San Francisco Unicorns; 105/5 (16.5 overs)
Corbin Bosch 21 (22); Matthew Short 4/17 (4 overs)		Sanjay Krishnamurthi 48* (45); Tristan Luus 2/21 (4 overs)

San Francisco Unicorns won by 5 wickets
Knight Riders Cricket Ground, Pomona
Umpires: Gregory Brathwaite (WI) and Rushane Samuels (WI)
Player of the match: Matthew Short (San Francisco Unicorns)

- San Francisco Unicorns won the toss and elected to field.

=== Round 4 (Grand Prairie) ===
Match 23
July 8, 2026
19:30 (D/N)
Scorecard

MI New York; 143/9 (20 overs)	v	San Francisco Unicorns; 146/1 (15.4 overs)
Ryan Rickelton 35 (21); Matthew Short 3/24 (4 overs)		Lhuan-dre Pretorius 102* (52); Romario Shepherd 1/17 (4 overs)

San Francisco Unicorns won by 9 wickets
Grand Prairie Stadium, Grand Prairie
Umpires: Wayne Knights (NZ) and Jermaine Lindo (USA)
Player of the match: Lhuan-dre Pretorius (San Francisco Unicorns)

- San Francisco Unicorns won the toss and elected to field.

Match 24
July 9, 2026
19:30 (D/N)
Scorecard

Los Angeles Knight Riders; 192/8 (20 overs)	v	Washington Freedom; 174/8 (20 overs)
Andre Fletcher 59 (40); Saurabh Netravalkar 3/33 (4 overs)		Lahiru Milantha 40 (25); Andre Russell 3/34 (4 overs)

Los Angeles Knight Riders won by 18 runs
Grand Prairie Stadium, Grand Prairie
Umpires: Gregory Brathwaite (WI) and Christopher Taylor (WI)
Player of the match: Sunil Narine (Los Angeles Knight Riders)

- Washington Freedom won the toss and elected to field.

Match 25
July 10, 2026
15:30
Scorecard

MI New York; 179/8 (20 overs)	v	Seattle Orcas; 162/6 (20 overs)
Tajinder Singh 66* (27); Marcus Stoinis 5/46 (4 overs)		Tim Seifert 88 (61); Kieron Pollard 2/9 (1.5 overs)

MI New York won by 17 runs
Grand Prairie Stadium, Grand Prairie
Umpires: Gregory Brathwaite (WI) and Christopher Taylor (WI)
Player of the match: Tajinder Singh (MI New York)

- Seattle Orcas won the toss and elected to field.

Match 26
July 10, 2026
19:30 (D/N)
Scorecard

Los Angeles Knight Riders; 184/7 (20 overs)	v	San Francisco Unicorns; 173 (19.1 overs)
Colin Munro 52 (43); Haris Rauf 3/25 (3 overs)		Hassan Khan 45 (33); Jason Holder 4/40 (4 overs)

Los Angeles Knight Riders won by 11 runs
Grand Prairie Stadium, Grand Prairie
Umpires: Jermaine Lindo (USA) and Vijaya Mallela (USA)
Player of the match: Jason Holder (Los Angeles Knight Riders)

- Los Angeles Knight Riders won the toss and elected to bat.

Match 27
July 11, 2026
15:30
Scorecard

Texas Super Kings; 165 (20 overs)	v	Washington Freedom; 166/7 (19.4 overs)
Faf du Plessis 61 (41); Mitchell Owen 2/19 (3 overs)		Steve Smith 46 (29); Akeal Hosein 2/26 (4 overs)

Washington Freedom won by 3 wickets
Grand Prairie Stadium, Grand Prairie
Umpires: Rushane Samuels (WI) and Christopher Taylor (WI)
Player of the match: Ben Dwarshuis (Washington Freedom)

- Washington Freedom won the toss and elected to field.

Match 28
July 11, 2026
19:30 (D/N)
Scorecard

Seattle Orcas; 190/7 (20 overs)	v	San Francisco Unicorns; 194/4 (19 overs)
Matthew Breetzke 55 (29); Xavier Bartlett 2/36 (4 overs)		Finn Allen 65 (31); Cameron Gannon 1/25 (2 overs)

San Francisco Unicorns won by 6 wickets
Grand Prairie Stadium, Grand Prairie
Umpires: Wayne Knights (NZ) and Vijaya Mallela (USA)
Player of the match: Finn Allen (San Francisco Unicorns)

- San Francisco Unicorns won the toss and elected to field.

Match 29
July 12, 2026
15:30
Scorecard

MI New York; 187/8 (20 overs)	v	Washington Freedom; 190/5 (18.3 overs)
Nicholas Pooran 86 (44); Rachin Ravindra 2/6 (1 over)		Andries Gous 96 (54); Trent Boult 2/33 (4 overs)

Washington Freedom won by 5 wickets
Grand Prairie Stadium, Grand Prairie
Umpires: Gregory Brathwaite (WI) and Rushane Samuels (WI)
Player of the match: Andries Gous (Washington Freedom)

- Washington Freedom won the toss and elected to field.

Match 30
July 12, 2026
19:30 (D/N)
Scorecard

Texas Super Kings; 171/9 (20 overs)	v	Los Angeles Knight Riders; 172/4 (19.1 overs)
Shubham Ranjane 51* (34); Jason Holder 3/33 (4 over)		Colin Munro 62 (36); Hardus Viljoen 2/42 (4 overs)

Los Angeles Knight Riders won by 6 wickets
Grand Prairie Stadium, Grand Prairie
Umpires: Wayne Knights (NZ) and Jermaine Lindo (USA)
Player of the match: Matthew Tromp (Los Angeles Knight Riders)

- Los Angeles Knight Riders won the toss and elected to field.

== Play-offs ==
Qualifier
July 15, 2026 – Oakland
1	San Francisco Unicorns	180/4 (20 overs)
2	Los Angeles Knight Riders	187/3 (20 overs)
Eliminator
July 15, 2026 – Oakland
3	Washington Freedom	270/4 (18.4 overs)
4	MI New York	266/9 (20 overs)

Challenger
July 16, 2026 – Oakland
QL	San Francisco Unicorns	231/6 (20 overs)
EW	Washington Freedom	238/6 (20 overs)

Final
July 18, 2026 – Oakland
QW	Los Angeles Knight Riders	164 (19.4 overs)
CW	Washington Freedom	163/9 (20 overs)

=== Qualifier ===
Qualifier
July 15, 2026
14:30
Scorecard

Los Angeles Knight Riders; 187/3 (20 overs)	v	San Francisco Unicorns; 180/4 (20 overs)
Andre Russell 62* (50); Ghulam Mudassar 2/42 (4 overs)		Matthew Short 94* (62); Sunil Narine 2/28 (4 overs)

Los Angeles Knight Riders won by 7 runs
Oakland Coliseum, Oakland
Attendance: 1,907
Umpires: Gregory Brathwaite (WI) and Christopher Taylor (WI)
Player of the match: Rovman Powell (Los Angeles Knight Riders)

- San Francisco Unicorns won the toss elected to field.

=== Eliminator ===
Eliminator
July 15, 2026
18:30 (D/N)
Scorecard

MI New York; 266/9 (20 overs)	v	Washington Freedom; 270/4 (18.4 overs)
Nicholas Pooran 106 (33); Rachin Ravindra 4/29 (4 overs)		Andries Gous 132 (51); Shakib Al Hasan 2/34 (4 overs)

Washington Freedom won by 6 wickets
Oakland Coliseum, Oakland
Attendance: 1,907
Umpires: Wayne Knights (NZ) and Jermaine Lindo (USA)
Player of the match: Andries Gous (Washington Freedom)

- Washington Freedom won the toss and elected to field.
- Andries Gous (Washington Freedom) became the first American cricketer to score a century in MLC.
- Nicholas Pooran (MI New York) scored the fastest half-century (off 14 balls), breaking Rovman Powell's record (off 15 balls) and the fastest century (off 31 balls), breaking Finn Allen's record (off 34 balls) in MLC.

=== Challenger ===
Challenger
July 16, 2026
18:30 (D/N)
Scorecard

Washington Freedom; 238/6 (20 overs)	v	San Francisco Unicorns; 231/6 (20 overs)
Andries Gous 73 (40); Xavier Bartlett 3/36 (4 overs)		Matthew Short 121* (56); Ben Dwarshuis 2/44 (4 overs)

Washington Freedom won by 7 runs
Oakland Coliseum, Oakland
Attendance: 2,163
Umpires: Leslie Reifer (WI) and Rushane Samuels (WI)
Player of the match: Andries Gous (Washington Freedom)

- San Francisco Unicorns won the toss elected to field.

=== Final ===
Final
July 18, 2026
16:30 (D/N)
Scorecard

Los Angeles Knight Riders; 164 (19.4 overs)	v	Washington Freedom; 163/9 (20 overs)
Andre Fletcher 47 (27); Ben Dwarshuis 3/31 (4 overs)		Obus Pienaar 53 (24); Sunil Narine 3/13 (4 overs)

Los Angeles Knight Riders won by 1 run
Oakland Coliseum, Oakland
Attendance: 11,000
Umpires: Gregory Brathwaite (WI) and Wayne Knights (NZ)
Player of the match: Sunil Narine (Los Angeles Knight Riders)

- Washington Freedom won the toss and elected to field.
- Los Angeles Knight Riders won their maiden title after 4 years.

== Season statistics ==
Most runs
Runs	Player	Team	Inns	HS	Ave	SR
547	(United States) Andries Gous	Washington Freedom	13	132	45.58	165.25
513	(Australia) Matthew Short	San Francisco Unicorns	12	121*	64.12	146.15
465	(South Africa) Lhuan-dre Pretorius	San Francisco Unicorns	12	102*	46.50	176.13
438	(New Zealand) Colin Munro	Los Angeles Knight Riders	11	64*	48.66	126.58
427	(Australia) Mitchell Owen	Washington Freedom	13	155	32.84	197.68

- Source: ESPNcricinfo

Most wickets
Wkts	Player	Team	Inns	Ovs	BBI	Eco
18	(Cricket West Indies) Sunil Narine	Los Angeles Knight Riders	11	43.0	3/13	4.74
18	(South Africa) Ottniel Baartman	Seattle Orcas	9	33.0	4/33	7.48
18	(Cricket West Indies) Andre Russell	Los Angeles Knight Riders	11	38.3	4/35	9.27
17	(Australia) Matthew Short	San Francisco Unicorns	10	27.0	4/17	7.14
16	(Australia) Marcus Stoinis	Seattle Orcas	9		5/46	

- Source: ESPNcricinfo

== Awards ==
On July 20, 2026, a list of end of season awards was announced.

Awards in the 2026 Major League Cricket
Name	Team	Award
Sunil Narine	Los Angeles Knight Riders	Most Valuable Player
Andries Gous	Washington Freedom	Leading run scorer
Sunil Narine	Los Angeles Knight Riders	Leading wicket taker
Andries Gous	Washington Freedom	Domestic Player of the Series
Matthew Tromp	Los Angeles Knight Riders	U23 player of the tournament

== Broadcasting ==
Broadcasters for the tournament
Country/Sub-region	Rights holder(s)
United States & Canada	Willow
Caribbean	ESPN
United Kingdom	Sky Sports
Middle East & North Africa	Cricbuzz
Sub-Saharan Africa	ESPN
India	Star Sports, JioHotstar
Australia	Seven
New Zealand	Sky NZ
Rest of world	MLC Network YouTube
