= 2026 San Francisco Unicorns season =

San Francisco Unicorns
2026 season
- Coach: Cameron White
- Captain: Matthew Short
- Overseas player: Finn Allen; Haris Rauf; Xavier Bartlett; Aaron Hardie; Oliver Peake; Lhuan-dre Pretorius
- MLC: 3rd-place
- GSL: Runners-up

The 2026 San Francisco Unicorns season was the fourth season of the franchise in Major League Cricket (MLC). The team was captained by Matthew Short and coached by Cameron White.

== Background ==
Ahead of the 2026 season, the Unicorns retained captain Matthew Short, Finn Allen, Haris Rauf, Cooper Connolly, Xavier Bartlett, Hassan Khan and other key players, while adding Aakarshit Gomel, Zia-ul-Haq, Muhammad Ilyas, Saideep Ganesh and Anirudh Imanuel through the Major League Cricket draft.

The Unicorns also signed Aaron Hardie, Oliver Peake and Lhuan-dre Pretorius ahead of the tournament. After Cooper Connolly was ruled out through injury, Connor Esterhuizen joined the squad as his replacement.

== Current squad ==
- Players with international caps are listed in **bold**.

San Francisco Unicorns 2026
Name	Nat.	Date of Birth	Batting Style	Bowling Style	Year signed	Notes
Batters
**Matthew Short** (c)	Australia	November 8, 1995 (age 31)	Right-handed	Right-arm off break	2024	Direct signing
**Finn Allen**	New Zealand	April 22, 1999 (age 27)	Right-handed	Right-arm off break	2023	Direct signing
Oliver Peake	Australia	February 6, 2006 (age 20)	Right-handed		2026	Direct signing
All-rounders
**Aaron Hardie**	Australia	January 7, 1999 (age 27)	Right-handed	Right-arm medium-fast	2026	Direct signing
**Ravichandran Ashwin**	India	September 17, 1986 (age 40)	Right-handed	Right-arm off break	2026	Direct signing
**Hassan Khan**	United States	September 5, 1998 (age 28)	Left-handed	Slow left-arm orthodox	2023	
Sanjay Krishnamurthi	United States	June 2, 2003 (age 23)	Right-handed	Right-arm off break	2023	
**Hammad Azam**	Pakistan	March 16, 1991 (age 35)	Right-handed	Right-arm medium-fast	2023	
Aakarshit Gomel	United States		Left-handed	Right-arm off break	2026	Draft
Anirudh Immanuel	United States				2026	Draft
Wicket-keepers
**Lhuan-dre Pretorius**	South Africa	March 27, 2006 (age 20)	Left-handed		2026	Direct signing
Saideep Ganesh	United States		Right-handed		2026	Draft
Bowlers
**Haris Rauf**	Pakistan	November 7, 1993 (age 33)	Right-handed	Right-arm fast	2023	Direct signing
**Xavier Bartlett**	Australia	December 17, 1998 (age 27)	Right-handed	Right-arm fast-medium	2024	Direct signing
Brody Couch	Australia	January 20, 1998 (age 28)	Right-handed	Right-arm fast-medium	2023	
Juanoy Drysdale	United States	September 8, 2000 (age 26)	Right-handed	Right-arm medium-fast	2023	
**Zia-ul-Haq**	Pakistan	November 3, 1994 (age 32)	Left-handed	Left-arm fast-medium	2026	Draft
Mohammad Ilyas	United States	July 19, 1999 (age 27)	Right-handed	Right-arm fast-medium	2026	Draft

== Standing ==
=== Points table ===
Pos	Team	Pld	W	L	NR	Pts	NRR	Qualification
1	San Francisco Unicorns (3rd)	10	6	4	0	12	0.487	Advanced to Qualifier
2	Los Angeles Knight Riders (C)	10	6	4	0	12	0.245	Advanced to Qualifier
3	Washington Freedom (R)	10	6	4	0	12	−0.399	Advanced to Eliminator
4	MI New York (4th)	10	5	5	0	10	−0.165	Advanced to Eliminator
5	Seattle Orcas	10	4	6	0	8	0.034	Eliminated
6	Texas Super Kings	10	3	7	0	6	−0.151	Eliminated

Source: ESPNCricinfo
(C) Champions; (R) Runners-up

=== Match summary ===
Team	Group matches										Playoffs		
Team	1	2	3	4	5	6	7	8	9	10	Q/E	C	F
Unicorns	0	2	2	4	4	6	8	8	10	12	W	L	—N/a

Win	Loss	Tie	No Result

== Play-offs ==
Qualifier
July 15 – Oakland
1	Unicorns	180/4 (20 overs)
2	Knight Riders	187/3 (20 overs)
Eliminator
July 15 – Oakland
3	Washington Freedom	270/4 (18.4 overs)
4	MI New York	266/9 (20 overs)

Challenger
July 16 – Oakland
QL	Unicorns	231/6 (20 overs)
EW	Washington Freedom	238/6 (20 overs)

Final
July 18 – Oakland
QW	Knight Riders	164 (19.4 overs)
CW	Washington Freedom	163/9 (20 overs)

== Administration and support staff ==
San Francisco Unicorns staff
Position	Name
Head coach	Cameron White
Assistant coach	Ashwell Prince
Assistant coach	Chamu Chibhabha
Team manager	David Mann
Strength and conditioning	Saeed Ajmal
Physiotherapist	Jacob Oram
