= 2025 Major League Cricket season =

Third season of Major League Cricket

2025 Major League Cricket
- Dates: June 12 – July 13, 2025
- Administrator(s): American Cricket Enterprises; USA Cricket
- Cricket format: Twenty20
- Tournament format(s): Double round-robin and playoffs
- Champions: MI New York (2nd title)
- Runners-up: Washington Freedom
- Participants: 6
- Matches: 34
- Player of the series: Mitchell Owen (Washington Freedom)
- Most runs: Monank Patel (MI New York) (478)
- Most wickets: Xavier Bartlett (San Francisco Unicorns) (18)
- Official website: Major League Cricket

The 2025 Major League Cricket (also known as MLC 2025, or for sponsorship reasons as 2025 Cognizant Major League Cricket) was the third season of Major League Cricket, a franchise Twenty20 cricket league established in 2019 by American Cricket Enterprises (ACE) in the United States. The tournament was played from June 12 to July 13, 2025.

In the final, MI New York defeated defending champions the Washington Freedom by 5 runs in a last-over thriller to win their second title.

== Background ==
In May 2024, MLC announced plans to expand its season from 19 games to 34 by its third season. By January 2025, amidst concerns that the league's schedule would overlap with other T20 leagues like The Hundred, MLC announced that their season would run from mid-June to July, thereby avoiding conflict. A full schedule would be released in March, following the season's annual domestic draft.

The domestic draft, which was held in February 2025, saw a number of top players released by teams – key amongst them being Pat Cummins and Travis Head.

== Teams ==
All six teams from the previous season will take part this season.

Teams in the 2025 Major League Cricket
Franchise	Captain	Head coach
Los Angeles Knight Riders	Sunil Narine	Dwayne Bravo
MI New York	Nicholas Pooran	Mark Boucher
San Francisco Unicorns	Corey Anderson (Note: Replaced by Matthew Short midseason due to injury)	Shane Watson
Seattle Orcas	Sikandar Raza (Note: Heinrich Klaasen stepped down as captain mid season)	TBD (Note: Matthew Mott parted ways as coach mid season)
Texas Super Kings	Faf du Plessis	Stephen Fleming
Washington Freedom	Glenn Maxwell (Note: Steve Smith will captain the side in the two games he plays)	Ricky Ponting

== Squads ==
Initially, ahead of the season opener, the appearance of Afghan players in the tournament was in doubt due to U.S. President Donald Trump's travel ban on twelve countries, including Afghanistan. Trump's proclamation, however, allowed travel for players participating in a "major sporting event"; MLC was classified as such an event, thus Afghan players were allowed to participate.

Los Angeles Knight Riders	MI New York	San Francisco Unicorns	Seattle Orcas	Texas Super Kings	Washington Freedom
Sunil Narine (c); Andre Russell; Jason Holder; Unmukt Chand; Corné Dry; Adithya Ganesh; Ali Khan; Nitish Kumar; Shadley van Schalkwyk; Matthew Tromp; Karthik Gattepalli; Anrich Nortje; Alex Hales; Rovman Powell; Sherfane Rutherford; Andre Fletcher; Tanveer Sangha	Nicholas Pooran (c); Dewald Brevis; Kieron Pollard; Ehsan Adil; Trent Boult; Nosthush Kenjige; Monank Patel; Sunny Patel; Heath Richards; Rushil Ugarkar; Agni Chopra; Tajinder Singh; Kunwarjit Singh; Sharad Lumba; George Linde; Quinton de Kock; Michael Bracewell; Naveen-ul-Haq; Fabian Allen; Delano Potgieter; Tristan Luus	Corey Anderson (c); Finn Allen; Brody Couch; Juanoy Drysdale; Jake Fraser-McGurk; Karima Gore; Hassan Khan; Sanjay Krishnamurthi; Carmi le Roux; Liam Plunkett; Haris Rauf; Matthew Short; Hammad Azam; Achilles Browne; Romario Shepherd; Xavier Bartlett; Tim Seifert; Callum Stow; Cooper Connolly	Sikandar Raza(c); Heinrich Klaasen; Ayan Desai; Cameron Gannon; Aaron Jones; David Warner; Ali Sheikh; Harmeet Singh; Jessy Singh; Sujit Nayak; Steven Taylor; Shayan Jahangir; Rahul Jariwala; Obed McCoy; Fazalhaq Farooqi; Shimron Hetmyer; Gulbadin Naib; Kyle Mayers; Waqar Salamkheil	Faf du Plessis (c); Noor Ahmad; Devon Conway; Milind Kumar; Mohammad Mohsin; Saiteja Mukkamalla; Calvin Savage; Marcus Stoinis; Joshua Tromp; Zia-ul-Haq; Shubham Ranjane; Stephen Wiig; Adam Khan; Daryl Mitchell; Nandre Burger; Adam Milne; Mitchell Marsh; Donovan Ferreira; Smit Patel	Glenn Maxwell (c); Mukhtar Ahmed; Amila Aponso; Justin Dill; Jack Edwards; Lockie Ferguson; Andries Gous; Ian Holland; Lahiru Milantha; Yasir Mohammad; Saurabh Netravalkar; Obus Pienaar; Rachin Ravindra; Abhishek Paradkar; Mark Chapman; Ben Sears; Steve Smith; Jason Behrendorff; Mitchell Owen; Glenn Phillips

== Venues ==
Matches were held at three venues: Grand Prairie's Grand Prairie Stadium, Lauderhill's Broward County Stadium, and Oakland's Oakland Coliseum. This was the first tournament in which games were held at Oakland and Lauderhill; Morrisville's Church Street Park hosted games the previous two tournaments.

A map of the United States with pin-points on 2025 Major League Cricket venues
Oakland	Grand Prairie	Lauderhill
Oakland Coliseum	Grand Prairie Stadium	Broward County Stadium
Capacity: 12,000	Capacity: 7,200	Capacity: 20,000
Matches: 9	Matches: 16	Matches: 9
Grand Prairie Stadium in 2024	The Oakland Coliseum in 2024	Central Broward Park in 2008

== Points table ==
Pos	Team	Pld	W	L	T	NR	Pts	NRR	Qualification
1	Washington Freedom	10	8	2	0	0	16	0.954	Advanced to Qualifier
2	Texas Super Kings	10	7	3	0	0	14	1.603	Advanced to Qualifier
3	San Francisco Unicorns	10	7	3	0	0	14	1.330	Advanced to Eliminator
4	MI New York (C)	10	3	7	0	0	6	−0.518	Advanced to Eliminator
5	Seattle Orcas	10	3	7	0	0	6	−1.842	Eliminated
6	Los Angeles Knight Riders	10	2	8	0	0	4	−1.320	Eliminated

Source: ESPNCricinfo
(C) Champions

=== Match summary ===
Team	Group matches										Playoffs		
Team	1	2	3	4	5	6	7	8	9	10	Q/E	C	F
Los Angeles Knight Riders	0	0	0	2	2	2	2	2	2	4			
MI New York	0	0	2	2	2	2	2	4	6	6	W	W	W
San Francisco Unicorns	2	4	6	8	10	12	12	12	14	14	L		
Seattle Orcas	0	0	0	0	0	2	4	6	6	6			
Texas Super Kings	2	4	6	6	6	8	10	12	12	14	L	L	
Washington Freedom	0	2	4	6	8	10	12	12	14	16	W		L

Win	Loss	No result

- Note: The total points at the end of each group match are listed.
- Note: Click on the points (group matches) or W/L (playoffs) to see the match summary.

Visitor team →	LAKR	MINY	SFU	SO	TSK	WF
Home team ↓	LAKR	MINY	SFU	SO	TSK	WF
Los Angeles Knight Riders		New York; 8 wickets	Los Angeles; 11 runs (DLS)	Seattle; 5 wickets	Texas; 57 runs	Washington; 5 wickets
MI New York	New York; 6 runs		San Francisco; 47 runs	New York; 7 wickets	Texas; 3 runs	Washington; 2 wickets
San Francisco Unicorns	San Francisco; 32 runs	San Francisco; 3 wickets		Seattle; 4 wickets	San Francisco; 1 run	San Francisco; 123 runs
Seattle Orcas	Los Angeles; 6 wickets	Seattle; 3 wickets	San Francisco; 32 runs		Texas; 51 runs	Washington; 5 wickets
Texas Super Kings	Texas; 52 runs	Texas; 39 runs	San Francisco; 7 wickets	Texas; 93 runs		Texas; 43 runs
Washington Freedom	Washington; 113 runs	Washington; 6 wickets	Washington; 12 runs	Washington; 8 wickets	Washington; 7 wickets	

Home team won	Visitor team won

- Note: Results listed are according to the home (horizontal) and visitor (vertical) teams.
- Note: Click on a result to see a summary of the match.

== League stage ==
Match 1
June 12, 2025
18:00 (D/N)
Scorecard

San Francisco Unicorns; 269/5 (20 overs)	v	Washington Freedom; 146 (13.1 overs)
Finn Allen 151 (51); Jack Edwards 2/39 (4 overs)		Rachin Ravindra 42 (17); Haris Rauf 3/30 (3.1 overs)

San Francisco Unicorns won by 123 runs
Oakland Coliseum, Oakland
Attendance: 5,126
Umpires: Leslie Reifer (WI) and Rushane Samuels (WI)
Player of the match: Finn Allen (San Francisco Unicorns)

- Washington Freedom won the toss and elected to field.
- Finn Allen (San Francisco Unicorns) scored the fastest century (off 34 balls) in Major League Cricket and also the second-fastest in any franchise T20 league, behind Chris Gayle's 30-ball century against Pune Warriors India in IPL 2013.
- Finn Allen scored the highest number of sixes (19) in innings breaking the record of Chris Gayle (18) in T20s.
- Finn Allen scored the fastest 150 (off 49 balls) in T20s, breaking the record of Dewald Brevis 150 (off 52 balls) against Knights.

Match 2
June 13, 2025
18:00 (D/N)
Scorecard

Texas Super Kings; 185/6 (20 overs)	v	MI New York; 182/8 (20 overs)
Devon Conway 65 (44); Michael Bracewell 2/34 (4 overs)		Monank Patel 62 (44); Adam Milne 3/22 (4 overs)

Texas Super Kings won by 3 runs
Oakland Coliseum, Oakland
Attendance: 6,356
Umpires: Wayne Knights (NZ) and Jermaine Lindo (USA)
Player of the match: Calvin Savage (Texas Super Kings)

- MI New York won the toss and elected to field.
- Adam Milne (Texas Super Kings) played his 200th T20 match.

Match 3
June 14, 2025
14:00
Scorecard

San Francisco Unicorns; 219/8 (20 overs)	v	Los Angeles Knight Riders; 187 (19.5 overs)
Jake Fraser-McGurk 88 (38); Shadley van Schalkwyk 3/50 (4 overs)		Unmukt Chand 53 (32); Xavier Bartlett 4/28 (3.5 overs)

San Francisco Unicorns won by 32 runs
Oakland Coliseum, Oakland
Attendance: 7,361
Umpires: Leslie Reifer (WI) and Billy Taylor (USA)
Player of the match: Jake Fraser-McGurk (San Francisco Unicorns)

- Los Angeles Knight Riders won the toss and elected to field.
- Matthew Tromp (Los Angeles Knight Riders) made his T20 debut.

Match 4
June 14, 2025
18:00 (D/N)
Scorecard

Seattle Orcas; 145/9 (20 overs)	v	Washington Freedom; 149/5 (13.3 overs)
David Warner 31 (17); Ian Holland 4/19 (4 overs)		Rachin Ravindra 44 (18); Waqar Salamkheil 2/27 (3.3 overs)

Washington Freedom won by 5 wickets
Oakland Coliseum, Oakland
Attendance: 7,361
Umpires: Jermaine Lindo (USA) and Vijaya Mallela (USA)
Player of the match: Ian Holland (Washington Freedom)

- Seattle Orcas won the toss and elected to bat.

Match 5
June 15, 2025
14:00
Scorecard

Texas Super Kings; 181/4 (20 overs)	v	Los Angeles Knight Riders; 124 (17.1 overs)
Daryl Mitchell 36* (33); Tanveer Sangha 2/32 (4 overs)		Shadley van Schalkwyk 27 (21); Noor Ahmad 4/25 (4 overs)

Texas Super Kings won by 57 runs
Oakland Coliseum, Oakland
Attendance: 6,450
Umpires: Rushane Samuels (WI) and Billy Taylor (USA)
Player of the match: Noor Ahmad (Texas Super Kings)

- Los Angeles Knight Riders won the toss and elected to field.

Match 6
June 15, 2025
18:00 (D/N)
Scorecard

MI New York; 182/7 (20 overs)	v	San Francisco Unicorns; 188/7 (19.1 overs)
Quinton de Kock 63 (38); Haris Rauf 2/24 (4 overs)		Xavier Bartlett 59* (25); Naveen-ul-Haq 2/28 (4 overs)

San Francisco Unicorns won by 3 wickets
Oakland Coliseum, Oakland
Attendance: 6,450
Umpires: Wayne Knights (NZ) and Jermaine Lindo (USA)
Player of the match: Xavier Bartlett (San Francisco Unicorns)

- San Francisco Unicorns won the toss and elected to field.
- Nicholas Pooran (MI New York) played his 400th match in T20s.

Match 7
June 16, 2025
18:00 (D/N)
Scorecard

Texas Super Kings; 153/6 (20 overs)	v	Seattle Orcas; 60 (13.5 overs)
Saiteja Mukkamalla 30 (23); Harmeet Singh Baddhan 2/24 (4 overs)		Aaron Jones 17 (17); Zia-ul-Haq 3/16 (3 overs)

Texas Super Kings won by 93 runs
Oakland Coliseum, Oakland
Attendance: 2,136
Umpires: Billy Taylor (USA) and Leslie Reifer (WI)
Player of the match: Zia-ul-Haq (Texas Super Kings)

- Seattle Orcas won the toss and elected to field.

Match 8
June 17, 2025
18:00 (D/N)
Scorecard

Washington Freedom; 208/5 (20 overs)	v	Los Angeles Knight Riders; 95 (16.3 overs)
Glenn Maxwell 106* (49); Corné Dry 2/33 (3 overs)		Saif Badar 32 (31); Jack Edwards 3/15 (3 overs)

Washington Freedom won by 113 runs
Oakland Coliseum, Oakland
Attendane: 1,985
Umpires: Wayne Knights (NZ) and Vijaya Mallela (USA)
Player of the match: Glenn Maxwell (Washington Freedom)

- Washington Freedom won the toss and elected to bat.

Match 9
June 18, 2025
18:00 (D/N)
Scorecard

Seattle Orcas; 200/5 (20 overs)	v	MI New York; 203/3 (19 overs)
Kyle Mayers 88 (46); Naveen-ul-Haq 2/64 (4 overs)		Monank Patel 93 (50); Sikandar Raza 2/37 (4 overs)

MI New York won by 7 wickets
Oakland Coliseum, Oakland
Attendance: 4,297
Umpires: Rushane Samuels (WI) and Leslie Reifer (WI)
Player of the match: Monank Patel (MI New York)

- Seattle Orcas won the toss and elected to bat.

Match 10
June 20, 2025
19:00 (D/N)
Scorecard

Texas Super Kings; 198/5 (20 overs)	v	San Francisco Unicorns; 202/3 (16.1 overs)
Faf du Plessis 100 (51); Xavier Bartlett 2/31 (4 overs)		Finn Allen 78 (35); Adam Milne 1/24 (3 overs)

San Francisco Unicorns won by 7 wickets
Grand Prairie Stadium, Grand Prairie
Umpires: Wayne Knights (NZ) and Jermaine Lindo (USA)
Player of the match: Matthew Short (San Francisco Unicorns)

- San Francisco Unicorns won the toss and elected to field.

Match 11
June 21, 2025
19:00 (D/N)
Scorecard

MI New York; 188/4 (20 overs)	v	Washington Freedom; 189/8 (19.2 overs)
Quinton de Kock 55 (34); Ian Holland 1/6 (1 over)		Mitchell Owen 60 (26); Naveen-ul-Haq 2/28 (4 overs)

Washington Freedom won by 2 wickets
Grand Prairie Stadium, Grand Prairie
Umpires: Rushane Samuels (WI) and Wayne Knights (NZ)
Player of the match: Mitchell Owen (Washington Freedom)

- Washington Freedom won the toss and elected to field.

Match 12
June 22, 2025
15:00
Scorecard

Seattle Orcas; 177/6 (20 overs)	v	Los Angeles Knight Riders; 178/4 (18.2 overs)
Aaron Jones 44 (36); Andre Russell 3/30 (4 overs)		Unmukt Chand 86* (58); Sikandar Raza 1/27 (3 overs)

Los Angeles Knight Riders won by 6 wickets
Grand Prairie Stadium, Grand Prairie
Umpires: Leslie Reifer (WI) and Billy Taylor (USA)
Player of the match: Unmukt Chand (Seattle Orcas)

- Seattle Orcas won the toss and elected to bat.

Match 13
June 22, 2025
19:00 (D/N)
Scorecard

Texas Super Kings; 220/6 (20 overs)	v	Washington Freedom; 223/3 (19.4 overs)
Faf du Plessis 69 (31); Mitchell Owen 3/33 (3 overs)		Mitchell Owen 89 (52); Adam Milne 3/42 (4 overs)

Washington Freedom won by 7 wickets
Grand Prairie Stadium, Grand Prairie
Umpires: Wayne Knights (NZ) and Vijaya Mallela (USA)
Player of the match: Mitchell Owen (Washington Freedom)

- Washington Freedom won the toss and elected to field.
- Andries Gous (Washington Freedom) played his 100th T20 match.

Match 14
June 23, 2025
19:00 (D/N)
Scorecard

San Francisco Unicorns; 246/4 (20 overs)	v	MI New York; 199/6 (20 overs)
Matthew Short 91 (43); Kieron Pollard 2/31 (3 overs)		Quinton de Kock 70 (46); Romario Shepherd 2/30 (4 overs)

San Francisco Unicorns won by 47 runs
Grand Prairie Stadium, Grand Prairie
Umpires: Jermaine Lindo (USA) and Leslie Reifer (WI)
Player of the match: Matthew Short (San Francisco Unicorns)

- MI New York won the toss and elected to field.
- Kieron Pollard (MI New York) played his 700th match in T20s.

Match 15
June 24, 2025
19:00 (D/N)
Scorecard

Texas Super Kings; 196/8 (20 overs)	v	Los Angeles Knight Riders; 144/7 (20 overs)
Shubham Ranjane 70 (45); Andre Russell 3/37 (4 overs)		Unmukt Chand 30 (30); Akeal Hosein 2/10 (3 overs)

Texas Super Kings won by 52 runs
Grand Prairie Stadium, Grand Prairie
Umpires: Rushane Samuels (WI) and Wayne Knights (NZ)
Player of the match: Donovan Ferreira (Texas Super Kings)

- Los Angeles Knight Riders won the toss and elected to field.

Match 16
June 25, 2025
19:00 (D/N)
Scorecard

San Francisco Unicorns; 176/8 (20 overs)	v	Seattle Orcas; 144 (18.2 overs)
Romario Shepherd 56 (31); Harmeet Singh Baddhan 3/22 (4 overs)		Shayan Jahangir 40 (22); Haris Rauf 4/32 (4 overs)

San Francisco Unicorns won by 32 runs
Grand Prairie Stadium, Grand Prairie
Umpires: Jermaine Lindo (USA) and Billy Taylor (USA)
Player of the match: Romario Shepherd (San Francisco Unicorns)

- Seattle Orcas won the toss and elected to field.

Match 17
June 26, 2025
19:00 (D/N)
Scorecard

Los Angeles Knight Riders; 213/4 (20 overs)	v	Washington Freedom; 214/5 (20 overs)
Andre Fletcher 104 (60); Ian Holland 2/25 (3 overs)		Mitchell Owen 43 (16); Tanveer Sangha 2/35 (4 overs)

Washington Freedom won by 5 wickets
Grand Prairie Stadium, Grand Prairie
Umpires: Wayne Knights (NZ) and Vijaya Mallela (USA)
Player of the match: Mitchell Owen (Washington Freedom)

- Washington Freedom won the toss and elected to field.
- Andre Fletcher and Sherfane Rutherford (Los Angeles Knight Riders) both scored their 8,000th and 3,000th run respectively in T20s.

Match 18
June 27, 2025
19:00 (D/N)
Scorecard

MI New York; 237/4 (20 overs)	v	Seattle Orcas; 238/7 (20 overs)
Nicholas Pooran 108* (60); Kyle Mayers 2/34 (4 overs)		Shimron Hetmyer 97* (40); Trent Boult 3/31 (4 overs)

Seattle Orcas won by 3 wickets
Grand Prairie Stadium, Grand Prairie
Umpires: Jermaine Lindo (USA) and Billy Taylor (USA)
Player of the match: Shimron Hetmyer (Seattle Orcas)

- Seattle Orcas won the toss and elected to field.

Match 19
June 28, 2025
15:00
Scorecard

Washington Freedom; 169/6 (20 overs)	v	San Francisco Unicorns; 157/9 (20 overs)
Glenn Phillips 58 (39); Xavier Bartlett 4/32 (4 overs)		Matthew Short 67 (40); Mitchell Owen 5/17 (3 overs)

Washington Freedom won by 12 runs
Grand Prairie Stadium, Grand Prairie
Umpires: Wayne Knights (NZ) and Rushane Samuels (WI)
Player of the match: Mitchell Owen (Washington Freedom)

- Washington Freedom won the toss and elected to bat.
- Mitchell Owen (Washington Freedom) took his first five-wicket haul in T20s.

Match 20
June 28, 2025
19:00 (D/N)
Scorecard

Los Angeles Knight Riders; 202/4 (20 overs)	v	Seattle Orcas; 206/5 (19.5 overs)
Andre Russell 65* (39); Waqar Salamkheil 2/29 (4 overs)		Aaron Jones 73 (38); Jason Holder 2/36 (4 overs)

Seattle Orcas won by 5 wickets
Grand Prairie Stadium, Grand Prairie
Umpires: Leslie Reifer (WI) and Billy Taylor (USA)
Player of the match: Shimron Hetmyer (Seattle Orcas)

- Seattle Orcas won the toss and elected to field.

Match 21
June 29, 2025
19:00 (D/N)
Scorecard

Texas Super Kings; 223/4 (20 overs)	v	MI New York; 184/8 (20 overs)
Faf du Plessis 103* (53); George Linde 2/42 (4 overs)		Kieron Pollard 70 (39); Akeal Hosein 3/15 (4 overs)

Texas Super Kings won by 39 runs
Grand Prairie Stadium, Grand Prairie
Umpires: Vijaya Mallela (USA) and Wayne Knights (NZ)
Player of the match: Akeal Hosein (Texas Super Kings)

- MI New York won the toss and elected to field.

Match 22
July 1, 2025
19:00 (D/N)
Scorecard

San Francisco Unicorns; 168/5 (20 overs)	v	Seattle Orcas; 169/6 (19.3 overs)
Sanjay Krishnamurthi 41 (28); Ayan Desai 2/32 (3 overs)		Shimron Hetmyer 78* (37); Xavier Bartlett 2/24 (4 overs)

Seattle Orcas won by 4 wickets
Broward County Stadium, Lauderhill
Umpires: Vijaya Mallela (USA) and Leslie Reifer (WI)
Player of the match: Shimron Hetmyer (Seattle Orcas)

- Seattle Orcas won the toss and elected to field.

Match 23
July 2, 2025
19:00 (D/N)
Scorecard

Texas Super Kings; 87/2 (5 overs)	v	Washington Freedom; 44/4 (5 overs)
Shubham Ranjane 39* (14); Saurabh Netravalkar 1/30 (2 overs)		Glenn Phillips 18* (11); Nandre Burger 2/12 (1 over)

Texas Super Kings won by 43 runs
Broward County Stadium, Lauderhill
Umpires: Wayne Knights (NZ) and Rushane Samuels (WI)
Player of the match: Donovan Ferreira (Texas Super Kings)

- Washington Freedom won the toss and elected to field.
- The match was reduced to 5 overs per side due to rain.

Match 24
July 3, 2025
19:00 (D/N)
Scorecard

Los Angeles Knight Riders; 154/8 (20 overs)	v	MI New York; 155/2 (17.5 overs)
Sherfane Rutherford 86 (44); Trent Boult 4/17 (4 overs)		Nicholas Pooran 62* (47); Sunil Narine 1/26 (4 overs)

MI New York won by 8 wickets
Broward County Stadium, Lauderhill
Umpires: Jermaine Lindo (USA) and Vijaya Mallela (USA)
Player of the match: Trent Boult (MI New York)

- MI New York won the toss and elected to field.

Match 25
July 4, 2025
15:00
Scorecard

San Francisco Unicorns; 148/6 (20 overs)	v	Texas Super Kings; 147/7 (20 overs)
Matthew Short 80 (63); Marcus Stoinis 3/32 (4 overs)		Donovan Ferreira 39 (20); Romario Shepherd 2/26 (3 overs)

San Francisco Unicorns won by 1 run
Broward County Stadium, Lauderhill
Umpires: Rushane Samuels (WI) and Billy Taylor (USA)
Player of the match: Matthew Short (San Francisco Unicorns)

- Texas Super Kings won the toss and elected to field.
- Akeal Hosein (Texas Super Kings) took his 200th wicket in T20s.

Match 26
July 4, 2025
19:00 (D/N)
Scorecard

Seattle Orcas; 82 (17.4 overs)	v	Washington Freedom; 86/2 (9.2 overs)
Heinrich Klaasen 48 (39); Glenn Maxwell 3/12 (4 overs)		Mukhtar Ahmed 36* (21); Jessy Singh 1/11 (1 over)

Washington Freedom won by 8 wickets
Broward County Stadium, Lauderhill
Umpires: Jermaine Lindo (USA) and Vijaya Mallela (USA)
Player of the match: Glenn Maxwell (Washington Freedom)

- Washington Freedom won toss and elected to field.

Match 27
July 5, 2025
15:00
Scorecard

MI New York; 142/9 (20 overs)	v	Los Angeles Knight Riders; 135/4 (20 overs)
Kieron Pollard 50 (36); Shadley van Schalkwyk 3/24 (3 overs)		Unmukt Chand 59 (48); Kieron Pollard 1/12 (2 overs)

MI New York won by 6 runs
Broward County Stadium, Lauderhill
Umpires: Rushane Samuels (WI) and Billy Taylor (USA)
Player of the match: Kieron Pollard (MI New York)

- Los Angeles Knight Riders won the toss and elected to field.

Match 28
July 5, 2025
19:00 (D/N)
Scorecard

Texas Super Kings; 188/4 (20 overs)	v	Seattle Orcas; 137 (18.4 overs)
Faf du Plessis 91 (52); Cameron Gannon 1/35 (3 overs)		Kyle Mayers 35 (28); Adam Milne 5/23 (3.4 overs)

Texas Super Kings won by 51 runs
Broward County Stadium, Lauderhill
Umpires: Jermaine Lindo (USA) and Leslie Reifer (WI)
Player of the match: Faf du Plessis (Texas Super Kings)

- Seattle Orcas won the toss and elected to field.

Match 29
July 6, 2025
15:00
Scorecard

MI New York; 112/8 (18 overs)	v	Washington Freedom; 113/4 (15 overs)
Kunwarjeet Singh 33 (30); Glenn Maxwell 3/29 (4 overs)		Andries Gous 46* (34); Tristan Luus 2/39 (4 overs)

Washington Freedom won by 6 wickets
Broward County Stadium, Lauderhill
Umpires: Wayne Knights (NZ) and Billy Taylor (USA)
Player of the match: Glenn Maxwell (Washington Freedom)

- MI New York won the toss and elected to bat.
- The match was reduced to 18 overs per side due to rain.

Match 30
July 6, 2025
19:00 (D/N)
Scorecard

Los Angeles Knight Riders; 243/3 (19 overs)	v	San Francisco Unicorns; 233 (18.5 overs)
Andre Fletcher 118 (58); Karima Gore 1/22 (2 overs)		Sanjay Krishnamurthi 92 (40); Karthik Gattepalli 3/31 (4 overs)

Los Angeles Knight Riders won by 11 runs (DLS method)
Broward County Stadium, Lauderhill
Umpires: Vijaya Mallela (USA) and Leslie Reifer (WI)
Player of the match: Andre Fletcher (Los Angeles Knight Riders)

- San Francisco Unicorns won the toss and elected to field.
- The match was reduced to 19 overs per side due to rain.
- Adithya Ganesh and Karthik Gattepalli (Los Angeles Knight Riders) both made their T20 debuts.
- San Francisco Unicorns were set a revised target of 245 runs off 19 overs due to rain.

== Play-offs ==
Qualifier
July 8, 2025 – Grand Prairie
1	Washington Freedom	Rainout (NR)
2	Texas Super Kings	Rainout (NR)
Eliminator
July 9, 2025 – Grand Prairie
3	San Francisco Unicorns	131 (19.1 overs)
4	MI New York	132/8 (19.3 overs)

Challenger
July 11, 2025 – Grand Prairie
QL	Texas Super Kings	166/5 (20 overs)
EW	MI New York	172/3 (19 overs)

Final
July 13, 2025 – Grand Prairie
QW	Washington Freedom	175/5 (20 overs)
CW	MI New York	180/7 (20 overs)

=== Qualifier ===
Qualifier
July 8, 2025
19:00 (D/N)
Scorecard

Texas Super Kings	v	Washington Freedom

Match abandoned without a ball bowled
Grand Prairie Stadium, Grand Prairie
Umpires: Wayne Knights (NZ) and Rushane Samuels (WI)

- Washington Freedom won the toss and elected to field.
- No play was possible due to rain.
- Washington Freedom advanced to the final as they finished above Texas Super Kings in the points table.

=== Eliminator ===
Eliminator
July 9, 2025
19:00 (D/N)
Scorecard

San Francisco Unicorns; 131 (19.1 overs)	v	MI New York; 132/8 (19.3 overs)
Xavier Bartlett 44 (24); Rushil Ugarkar 3/19 (3.1 overs)		Quinton de Kock 33 (24); Hasan Khan 4/30 (4 overs)

MI New York won by 2 wickets
Grand Prairie Stadium, Grand Prairie
Umpires: Leslie Reifer (WI) and Billy Taylor (USA)
Player of the match: Trent Boult (MI New York)

- MI New York won the toss and elected to field.

=== Challenger ===
Challenger
July 11, 2025
19:00 (D/N)
Scorecard

Texas Super Kings; 166/5 (20 overs)	v	MI New York; 172/3 (19 overs)
Faf du Plessis 59 (42); Tristan Luus 3/35 (4 overs)		Nicholas Pooran 52* (36); Akeal Hosein 1/11 (3 overs)

MI New York won by 7 wickets
Grand Prairie Stadium, Grand Prairie
Umpires: Jermaine Lindo (USA) and Rushane Samuels (WI)
Player of the match: Kieron Pollard (MI New York)

- MI New York won the toss and elected to field.

=== Final ===
Final
July 13, 2025
19:00 (D/N)
Scorecard

MI New York; 180/7 (20 overs)	v	Washington Freedom; 175/5 (20 overs)
Quinton de Kock 77 (46); Lockie Ferguson 3/21 (4 overs)		Rachin Ravindra 70 (41); Trent Boult 2/32 (4 overs); Rushil Ugarkar 2/32 (4 overs)

MI New York won by 5 runs
Grand Prairie Stadium, Grand Prairie
Umpires: Wayne Knights (NZ) and Leslie Reifer (WI)
Player of the match: Rushil Ugarkar (MI New York)

- Washington Freedom won the toss and elected to field.

== Season statistics and awards ==
=== Most runs ===
Runs	Player	Team	Inns	HS	SR	Ave
478	Monank Patel	MI New York	13	93	142.26	36.76
468	Faf du Plessis	Texas Super Kings	10	103*	170.18	52.00
373	Quinton de Kock	MI New York	12	77	142.91	31.08
369	Matthew Short	San Francisco Unicorns	8	91	164.38	45.00
360	Nicholas Pooran	MI New York	13	108*	134.83	36.00

- Source: ESPNcricinfo

=== Most wickets ===
Wkts	Player	Team	Inns	Ovs	BBI	Eco
18	Xavier Bartlett	San Francisco Unicorns	11	40.1	4/28	8.86
17	Haris Rauf	San Francisco Unicorns	8	28.1	4/32	9.08
15	Trent Boult	MI New York	12	48.0	4/17	8.00
15	Noor Ahmad	Texas Super Kings	11	42.0	4/25	8.04
14	Adam Milne	Texas Super Kings	6	20.5	5/23	7.10

- Source: ESPNcricinfo

=== End of season awards ===
- Highest Wicket Taker of the Tournament: Xavier Bartlett
- Most Valuable Player of the Tournament: Mitchell Owen
- Domestic Player of the Tournament: Monank Patel
- Most Valuable Player and the Best U23 Player of the Tournament: Rushil Ugarkar

== Broadcasting ==
Broadcasters for the tournament
Country/Sub-region	Rights holder(s)
North America	Willow
Northern California	NBC Sports Bay Area, NBC Sports California (SFU matches only)
Caribbean	ESPN
United Kingdom	Premier Sports
Middle East	Cricbuzz
North Africa	Cricbuzz
Sub-Saharan Africa	ESPN
India	Star Sports, JioHotstar
Pakistan	A Sports
Australia	Seven
New Zealand	Sky NZ
