= Clinton Peake =

Australian cricketer (born 1977)

Personal information
- Full name: Clinton John Peake
- Born: 25 March 1977 (age 49); Geelong, Victoria, Australia
- Batting: Left-handed
- Bowling: Slow left-arm orthodox
- Role: Batsman
- Relatives: Oliver Peake (son)

Domestic team information
- Years: Team
- 1995/96–2000/01: Victoria
- First-class debut: 24 November 1995 Victoria v Pakistan
- Last First-class: 4 January 2001 Victoria v Western Australia
- List A debut: 10 December 1995 Victoria v Tasmania
- Last List A: 16 January 2001 Victoria v Western Australia

Career statistics
Competition	First-class	List A
Matches	9	5
Runs scored	303	24
Batting average	20.20	6.00
100s/50s	0/0	0/0
Top score	46	14
Balls bowled	157	30
Wickets	2	0
Bowling average	53.00	–
5 wickets in innings	0	–
10 wickets in match	0	–
Best bowling	1/11	–
Catches/stumpings	7/0	2/0
- Source: CricketArchive, 5 November 2011

Clinton John Peake (born 25 March 1977 in Geelong, Victoria) is a former Australian first-class cricketer.

In his early career, Peake, a batsman, was selected as part of the Australian under-19s cricket team, which he captained in the 1994/95 season at 17 years of age. He scored 304 against Indian Youth in a match in Melbourne that season, the highest score in a U19 international match.

In the 1995/96 season, Peake made his first-class debut with the Victorian Bushrangers at just 18 years of age. He played six matches (and one List A match) but did not live up to the potential of his under-19s performances and was soon dropped. He did not play a Sheffield Shield match in 1996/97, with only one List A performance to his name.

Peake then spent three seasons in the wilderness before returning to the Bushrangers in the 1999/2000 season, still only 22 years of age. He played one first-class match that season, where he again failed, making scores of 1 and 4. He was retained for 2000/01, but again struggled, averaging 6.33 with the bat over three one-day matches, and 17.66 in four first-class innings.

These performances effectively ended his first-class career, and he headed back to his hometown of Geelong to play for the Geelong Cricket Club in Victorian Premier Cricket.

== Personal life ==
Peake works in Geelong as a taxation adviser, specialising in assisting farmers and family businesses. His son Oliver Peake made his debut as a cricketer for Victoria in 2024-25.
