= Matthew Tromp =

American cricketer (born 2005)

Personal information
- Full name: Matthew Warren Tromp
- Born: April 1, 2005 (age 21); South Africa
- Batting: Right-handed
- Bowling: Right-arm medium-fast
- Role: All-rounder

Domestic team information
- Years: Team
- 2022: Gujranwala Giants
- 2025: Seattle Orcas
- 2025–2026: Los Angeles Knight Riders
- 2026: Trinbago Knight Riders
- Abu Dhabi Knight Riders

Career statistics
| Competition | T20 |
|---|---|
| Matches | 22 |
| Runs scored | 400 |
| Batting average | 26.66 |
| 100s/50s | 0/2 |
| Top score | 58* |
| Balls bowled | 6 |
| Wickets | 0 |
| Bowling average | – |
| 5 wickets in innings | 0 |
| 10 wickets in match | 0 |
| Best bowling | 0/19 |
| Catches/stumpings | 9/– |
- Source: Windies Cricket, October 28, 2026

Matthew Warren Tromp (born April 1, 2005) is an American professional cricketer. Born in South Africa, he represents the United States in domestic and franchise cricket. He is a right-handed batter and right-arm medium-fast bowler who plays as an all-rounder.

Tromp represented the Gujranwala Giants in the 2022 Pakistan Junior League. He has also played for teams including the Seattle Orcas and Los Angeles Knight Riders in Major League Cricket. In 2026, he was part of the Los Angeles Knight Riders team that won the Major League Cricket championship.

== Early life ==
Matthew Tromp and his twin brother, Joshua, grew up in South Africa and represented Gauteng at under-16 level. Their family moved from Johannesburg to Austin, Texas, in the United States, in 2022 after their father, Brett Tromp, accepted a job there.

Growing up, Tromp participated in several sports, including cricket, golf, field hockey and tennis. He and his brother developed their cricket skills in South Africa before continuing their careers in the United States. Tromp also became the number one varsity tennis player at his school in Austin.

In October 2025, Tromp moved to Christchurch, New Zealand, with his brother to play club cricket and further develop their skills. Tromp joined Sydenham Cricket Club, while his brother played for Old Boys Collegians. The move provided Tromp with an opportunity to gain experience in different formats of the game and compete in a more sustained cricket environment.
