= Tajinder Singh =

Indian cricketer (born 1992)

Personal information
- Full name: Tajinder Singh Dhillon
- Born: 25 May 1992 (age 34); Dholpur, Rajasthan, India
- Batting: Right handed
- Bowling: Right arm off-break
- Role: All-rounder

Domestic team information
- Years: Team
- 2016–17: Rajasthan
- 2023-2024: San Francisco Unicorns
- 2025-present: MI New York
- 2026-present: Antigua & Barbuda Falcons

Career statistics
Competition	FC	LA	T20
Matches	11	16	52
Runs scored	515	296	816
Batting average	32.18	22.76	22.66
100s/50s	1/0	0/2	0/4
Top score	134	60*	95
Balls bowled	1,034	492	390
Wickets	11	11	19
Bowling average	51.63	36.18	24.47
5 wickets in innings	0	0	0
10 wickets in match	0	0	0
Best bowling	2/38	3/45	4/25
Catches/stumpings	4/0	7/0	21/0
- Source: ESPNcricinfo, 7 August 2026

Tajinder Singh (born 25 May 1992) is an Indian-born Canadian cricketer.

== Career ==
Tajinder made his Twenty20 debut for Rajasthan in the 2016–17 Inter State Twenty-20 Tournament on 30 January 2017. He made his List A debut for Rajasthan in the 2016–17 Vijay Hazare Trophy on 25 February 2017.

Tajinder made his first-class debut for Rajasthan in the 2017–18 Ranji Trophy on 6 October 2017. In his next match, on 14 October 2017 against Jharkhand, he scored his maiden first-class century.

In January 2018, Tajinder was bought by the Mumbai Indians in the 2018 IPL auction. In the 2020 IPL auction, he was bought by the Kings XI Punjab ahead of the 2020 Indian Premier League.

In June 2025, Tajinder hit a T20 career best of 95 runs off just 35 balls for MI New York against the Seattle Orcas during the 2025 MLC. This included a 158 run, 68 ball partnership with Nicholas Pooran.

In July 2026 during the 2026 MLC, Tajinder hit an unbeaten 66* from just 27 deliveries, as his lower-order finishing took MI New York to a par total of 179, which they comfortably defended by 17 runs against the Seattle Orcas. He won player of the match for this innings.
