= Knight Riders Cricket Ground =

Cricket ground at Fairplex in Pomona, California, US

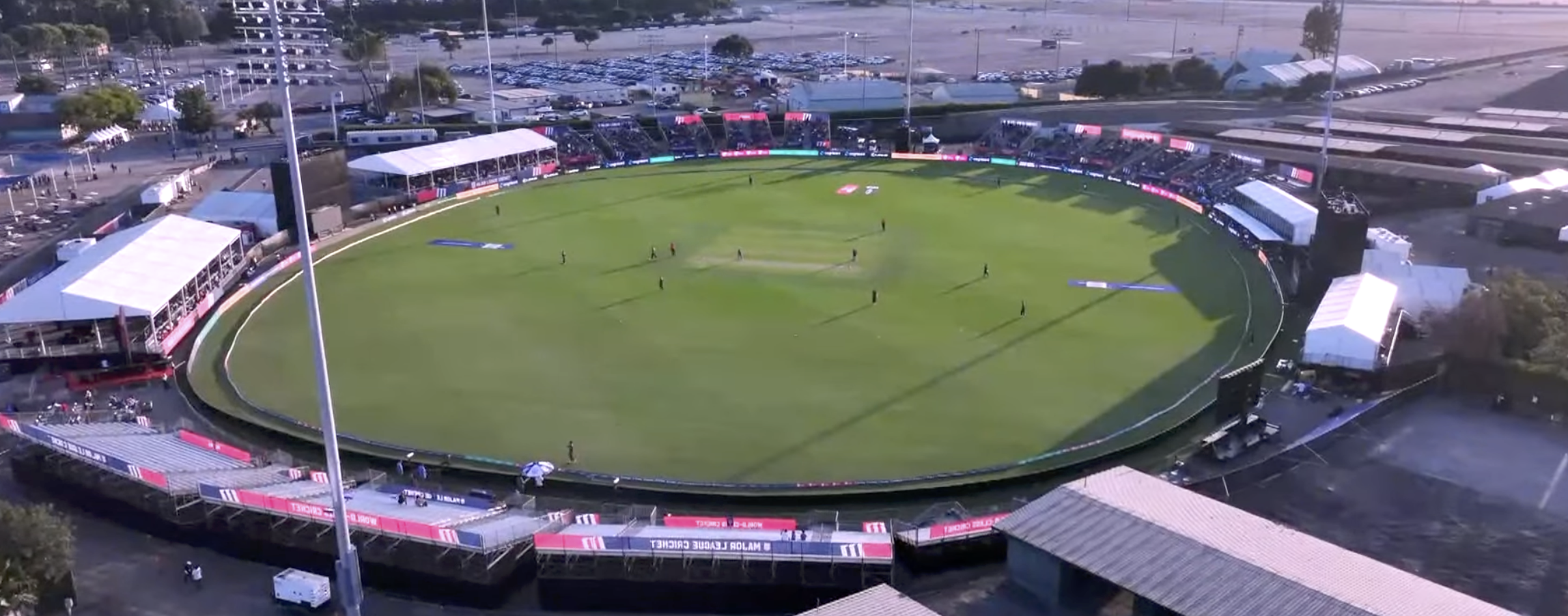
- Interactive map of Knight Riders Cricket Ground
- Location: Fairplex, 1101 W McKinley Ave; Pomona, California, United States
- Coordinates: 34°05′11″N 117°45′59″W
- Owner: Los Angeles County Fair Association (Fairplex)
- Operator: Knight Riders Group
- Surface: Grass

Construction
- Opened: July 1, 2026

Tenant
- Los Angeles Knight Riders (MLC) (2026–present)

Knight Riders Group

Current Teams
- Kolkata Knight Riders (2008–present); Trinbago Knight Riders (2015–present); Trinbago Knight Riders Women (2022–present); Abu Dhabi Knight Riders (2023–present); Los Angeles Knight Riders (2023–present)

Stadium
- Knight Riders Cricket Ground (2026–present)

Knight Riders Cricket Ground is a cricket ground at the Fairplex in Pomona, California. Opened in July 2026, it is expected to host the Twenty20 cricket tournaments during the 2028 Summer Olympics in Los Angeles, and serves as one of the host stadiums of the T20 league Major League Cricket.

== History ==
=== Initial plans, cricket at the Olympics ===
In November 2020, the Knight Riders Group—led by Bollywood actor Shah Rukh Khan—made an investment in the then-upcoming U.S. Twenty20 (T20) league Major League Cricket (MLC), and was granted ownership rights to the Los Angeles franchise that would become the Los Angeles Knight Riders. Khan stated that he was "closely watching the potential" for T20 in the United States as part of his efforts to grow the Knight Riders brand globally.

In March 2022, MLC parent company American Cricket Enterprises (ACE) announced plans to invest US$110 million into new and existing U.S. cricket grounds to serve as home stadiums for MLC teams in the future. The Knight Riders proposed the construction of a 10,000-seat stadium at the Great Park sports complex in Irvine, California, which was reported to have an estimated cost of $30 million. The stadium was proposed as a site for international cricket events such as ICC tournaments (including the then-upcoming 2024 Men's T20 World Cup co-hosted with the West Indies), as well as a proposal for cricket to be contested at the 2028 Summer Olympics in Los Angeles.

In the meantime, MLC launched with a neutral-site model, with most matches played at the Grand Prairie Stadium—a former baseball stadium in Grand Prairie, Texas that had been purchased by ACE and converted to a cricket-specific facility; the stadium is intended as the home stadium of the Texas Super Kings. The league has occasionally played matches outside of Grand Prairie, including at Church Street Park, Central Broward Park, and the Oakland Coliseum.

In October 2023, the International Olympic Committee (IOC) approved the addition of T20 cricket and four other sports to the 2028 Summer Olympics' program, marking the first time cricket will be contested as an Olympic event since 1900. After initially considering plans to build the

In April 2025, the Los Angeles Organizing Committee for the 2028 Olympic and Paralympic Games (LAOCOG) announced that cricket would take place at a temporary cricket ground constructed at the Fairplex, similar to the Nassau County International Cricket Stadium constructed near New York City for the 2024 Men's T20 World Cup.

=== Construction and opening ===
In August 2025, it was reported that the Fairplex was in discussions with the Knight Riders Group over funding a permanent facility instead, which could be used by the Los Angeles Knight Riders, and expanded with temporary seating for the Olympics. On March 19, 2026, the Knight Riders Group announced that they had leased land at the Fairplex to construct a cricket stadium known as the Knight Riders Cricket Ground, which would serve as both the Los Angeles Knight Riders' home stadium, and the cricket venue during the 2028 Summer Olympics.

Construction of the $21 million stadium began with a groundbreaking ceremony on April 26, 2026, attended by Pomona mayor Tim Sandoval, Fairplex president and CEO Walter Marquez, Knight Riders Sports CEO Venky Mysore, LAOCOG vice president of sports Niccolò Campriani, and ICC CEO Sanjog Gupta among other figures. It was anticipated to be completed by July 2026, being scheduled to host seven matches (including three Knight Riders matches) as part of the 2026 MLC season. Upon its completion, it will become the second cricket stadium developed for MLC behind Grand Prairie Stadium. The stadium will initially seat up to 5,000 spectators, but will be expanded to 12,000 seats by 2027, and then 15,000 by 2028 for the Olympics.

Khan stated that the project aims to "create not just a cricket ground, but a space of energy, community, and belonging." ICC president Jay Shah stated that the grounds were "an important milestone in cricket's return to the Olympics and is a proud moment for all ICC members and stakeholders worldwide. We're confident this venue will take center stage during the Games and leave a legacy for cricket in the USA."

The stadium opened on July 1, 2026, with the Knight Riders playing its inaugural match in front of around 2,000 spectators.

== Tenants ==
=== Los Angeles Knight Riders ===
The Los Angeles Knight Riders hosted the stadium's inaugural match on July 1, 2026, losing to the Washington Freedom by 6 wickets.

== See also ==
- Venues of the 2028 Summer Olympics and Paralympics
