= Fairplex =

Fairgrounds for Los Angeles County in Pomona, California, U.S.

Coordinates: 34.088919°N 117.767816°W

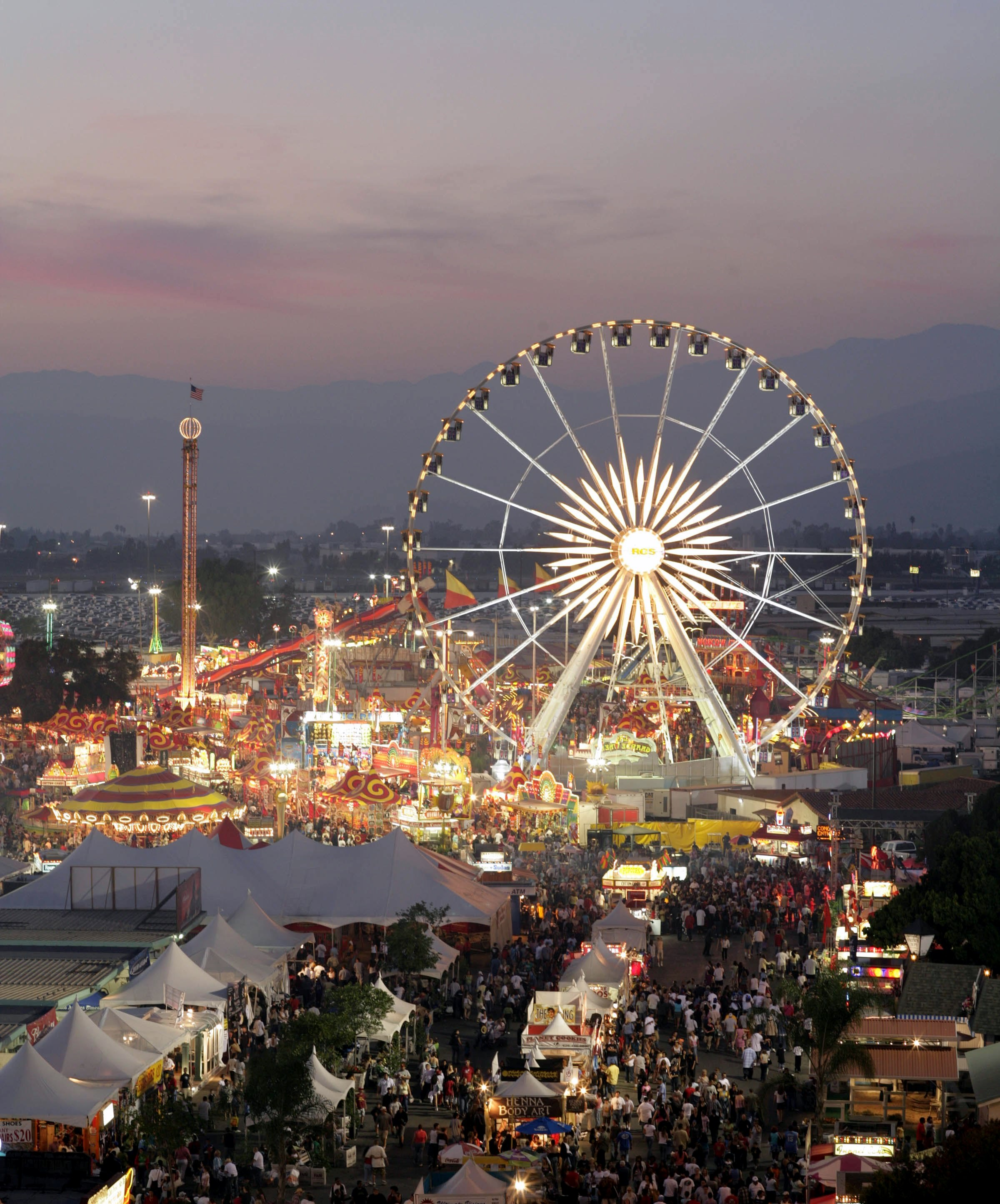
L.A. County Fair at dusk, 2008

The Fairplex in Pomona, California, has been the home of the Los Angeles County Fair since 1922. Known until 1984 as the Los Angeles County Fairgrounds, the 543-acre (2.2 km^{2}) facility hosts the Fair in May and year-round for trade and consumer shows, conventions, sporting events, and more.

The Fairplex is owned by Los Angeles County, but is leased to and is governed by an independent, self-supporting non-profit organization, the Los Angeles County Fair Association, which manages and produces the county fair and spends surplus revenue to maintain and develop the facility.

== Facilities ==
Having begun in 1922 with 43 acres (170,000 m^{2}) donated by the City of Pomona, the Fairplex grounds now cover 543 acres (2.2 km^{2}) and include nearly 325,000 square feet (30,200 m^{2}) of indoor exhibit space. Slightly less than half of the grounds are given over to paved parking areas to accommodate 30,000 vehicles. Among other features of the Fairplex are various scenic parks, plazas and picnic areas, a historic train exhibit, and 12 acres (49,000 m^{2}) of carnival grounds.

=== Railways ===
The RailGiants Train Museum is owned and maintained by the Southern California Chapter of the Railway & Locomotive Historical Society. The museum operates the volunteer-maintained Fairplex Garden Railway, a G scale model railroad. It is generally operated for the public on the second Sunday of the month from November through July, during the L.A. County Fair, and at Christmastime.

=== Barretts OTB, sales, and closed race facilities ===
There is a large off-track betting (OTB) horse wagering racebook at the Fairplex, located on White Avenue, about a mile north from McKinley Avenue in Pomona. The OTB accepts racing signals from the United States, Canada, and Australia. There is also a restaurant and Sports Bar called The Derby Room. Next to the OTB is Barretts Sales and Racing, a horse facility with a (now closed) 5/8 mile racetrack and a grandstand seating 10,000. Barrett's provided equine training facilities, horse show facilities, and the Barrett's Equine Limited horse auction complex. The grandstand facility is also used to host concerts and special events accommodating up to 15,000 patrons. Barrett's and the Los Angeles County Fair Association reached an agreement in February 2013 for naming rights, and the race meet was referred to as the "Barrett's Race Meet at Fairplex." In addition to horse races, the track hosted the final round of the American Flat Track motorcycle racing series in 2009 and from 2011 to 2014.

The Fairplex is home to a large dragstrip known as the In-N-Out Burger Pomona Dragstrip, which hosts both the opening and closing rounds of the NHRA drag racing series. The Fairplex is also the location of the Wally Parks NHRA Motor Sports Museum, presented by the Automobile Club of Southern California.

The Fairplex is the site of the Millard Sheets Center for the Arts at Fairplex, a year-round education and exhibit space affiliated with The Smithsonian Institution. The center is located in the historic Fine Arts building, a 12,000-square-foot (1,100 m^{2}) facility designed by architect Claud Beelman and erected by the WPA in 1937. In 1994 the building was renamed in honor of artist Millard Sheets, a Pomona native who was the director of the county fair's art programs from 1930 to 1956.

=== RV park ===
From 2015 through 2017, the Fairplex became the subject of news and investigation by the Los Angeles Times for the improper collection of taxes from Fairplex RV Park residents, as well as its neglect of the RV park grounds, which resulted in issues with bed bugs and roaches as well as infrastructure problems that include damaged roads and walkways, bathrooms in disrepair, inadequate plumbing and electrical fixtures. In 2017, in a separate article written by the Los Angeles Times, the Los Angeles Fair Association agreed to a $325,000 settlement with the residents of the Fairplex RV Park. The settlement agreement allowed at least 475 people to be reimbursed for improper collection of taxes. Unfortunately, due to the law that provides a legal right to recover improperly collected taxes, residents were only able to file for reimbursement as far back as four years prior to the 2015 lawsuit, leaving some residents unable to request reimbursement for taxes collected prior to that date. Within the aforementioned article, it has also been reported that the Association has spent $250,000 on renovations of public bathrooms and showers, and calls for more transparency of the Los Angeles Fair Association by the public and the City of Pomona.

=== Knight Riders Cricket Ground ===
The Los Angeles Knight Riders play at a cricket ground in Fairplex, the Knight Riders Cricket Ground as of the 2026 Major League Cricket season. In April 2025, the Fairplex was announced as the venue for Cricket at the 2028 Summer Olympics. The stadium opened on July 1, 2026.

== Pomona Assembly Center ==
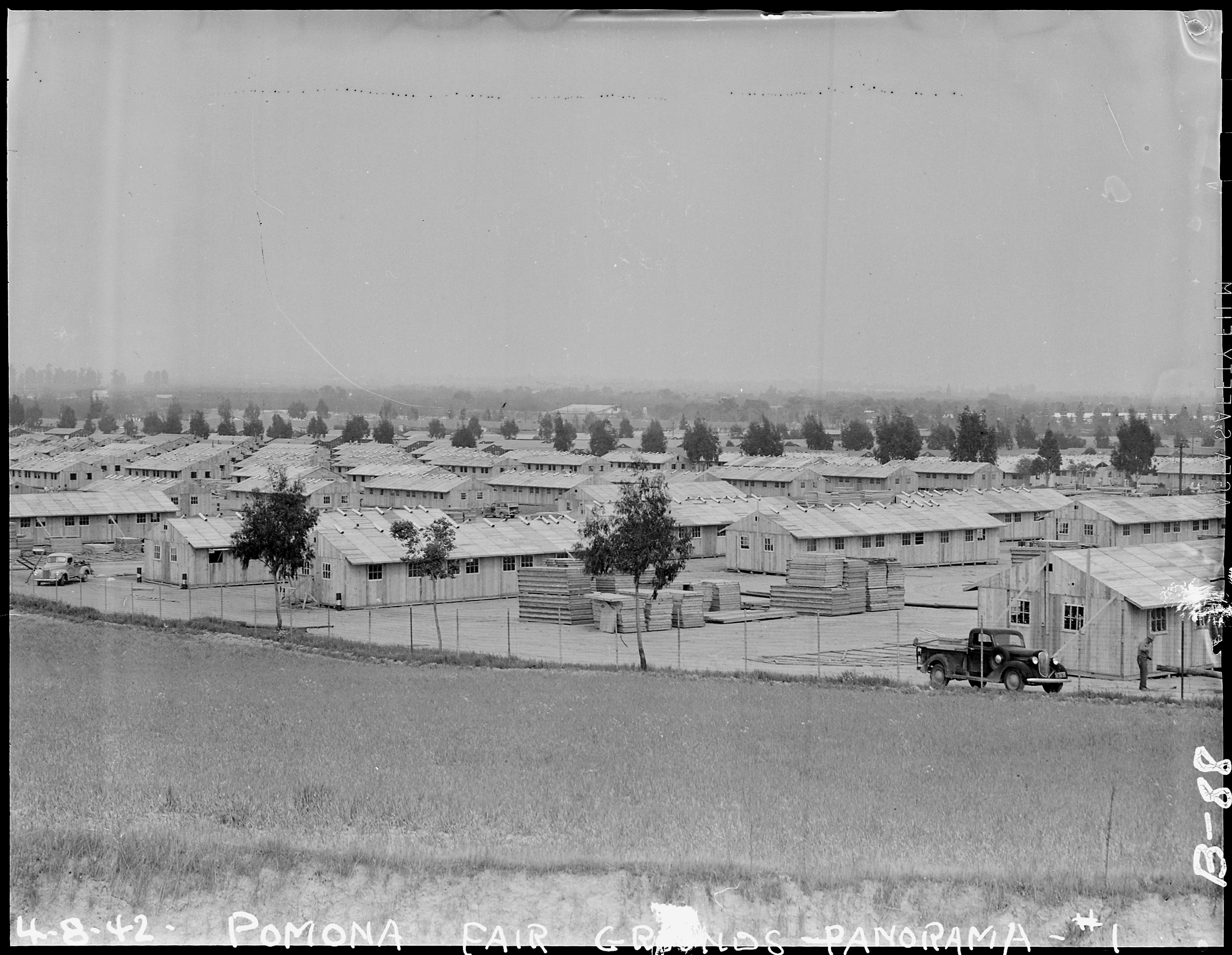
Construction of the Pomona Assembly Center.

During World War II, the Los Angeles County Fairgrounds was the site of one of several temporary detention camps (also known as assembly centers) located throughout the West. The first phase of the mass incarceration of 97,785 Californians of Japanese ancestry during the war. Most internees were U.S. citizens. Pursuant to Executive Order 9066, signed by President Franklin D. Roosevelt on February 19, 1942, fifteen makeshift detention facilities were constructed at various California racetracks, fairgrounds and labor camps. These facilities confined Japanese American citizens until permanent location centers such as those in Manzanar and Tule Lake in California could be built in more isolated areas of the country. Beginning on March 30, 1942, native-born American citizens and long-time legal residents of Japanese ancestry living in California were ordered to surrender themselves for detention.

Construction on the Pomona assembly center began on March 21, 1942, and the camp officially opened on May 7, 1942. The Pomona Facility consisted of 309 barracks, 8 mess halls, and 36 shower and latrine facilities. The first group of 72 Japanese American citizens arrived on May 9. By May 15, 1942, the Pomona site was operating near capacity, with 4,270 internees. Pomona reached a peak population of 5,434 before its closing on August 24, 1942. Most internees there were transferred to Heart Mountain in Wyoming. The site remained in use for the duration of the war, first housing U.S. troops, and then German and Italian prisoners of war. Today, the site serves as the Fairplex parking lot.

On August 24, 2016, a plaque was erected to recognize the former assembly center, POW camp.

== Location ==
It is located at 1101 W. McKinley Ave., Pomona, California, approximately 30 miles (48 km) east of downtown Los Angeles.

== Transportation ==
The facility features a Metrolink platform on the north side of the property, where San Bernardino Line trains provide passenger services on fair days.

Preceding station	Metrolink	Following station
Covina toward L.A. Union Station	San Bernardino Line (fair days)	Pomona–North toward San Bernardino or Redlands

Los Angeles County operates a free Park and Ride facility for commuters adjacent to the grounds at 1810 Gillette Road with 553 spaces available. Weekday connections to/from downtown Los Angeles are available via the Foothill Transit route 699 bus. The Foothill Transit route 197 bus connects the facility to the Montclair Transit Center and Pomona–Downtown station.

The Los Angeles Metro Rail La Verne/Fairplex station on the Foothill Extension services the Fairplex. The station opened on September 19, 2025. The project will include a pedestrian overpass connecting the Metro Rail station with both the Metrolink station and the Fairplex.

== In popular culture ==
- The rodeo scenes in Pee-wee's Big Adventure were shot at the Fairplex in 1985.
- 2 songs, "The Loco-Motion" and "The little Red Caboose", from the 1994 Kidsongs video: Boppin' with the Biggles were shot at the Railroad museum where three locomotives on the Union Pacific Railroad; a 4–12–2 #9000, a Centennial Built Diesel 6915, and a Big Boy 4014, are featured throughout the two songs as well as a Southern Pacific 4–10–2 #5021 and an Atchison, Topeka and Santa Fe Caboose #1314 was re-identified to "The Biggle Express" For the 2 Songs.
- In the 2003 film Seabiscuit, the Fairplex racetrack was used to represent the defunct Agua Caliente Racetrack in Tijuana.
- In the Robert Altman movie California Split the racetrack scenes were filmed at Fairplex Park.
