= Andre Russell =

Jamaican cricketer (born 1988)

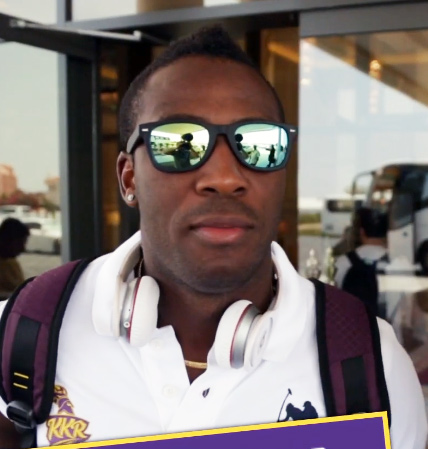
- Andre Russell during IPL season 2014

Personal information
- Full name: Andre Dwayne Russell
- Born: 29 April 1988 (age 38); Jamaica
- Nickname: Dre Russ
- Height: 6 ft 1 in (1.85 m)
- Batting: Right-handed
- Bowling: Right-arm fast
- Role: All-rounder
- Website: DreRuss.com

International information
- National side: West Indies (2010–2025)
- Only Test (cap 288): 15 November 2010 v Sri Lanka
- ODI debut (cap 156): 11 March 2011 v Ireland
- Last ODI: 17 June 2019 v Bangladesh
- ODI shirt no.: 12
- T20I debut (cap 46): 21 April 2011 v Pakistan
- Last T20I: 22 July 2025 v Australia
- T20I shirt no.: 12

Domestic team information
- Years: Team
- 2006/07–2017/18: Jamaica (Note: Only teams which Russell has played for in more than one season are included in this list.)
- 2012–2013: Delhi Daredevils
- 2013–2021: Jamaica Tallawahs
- 2014–2025: Kolkata Knight Riders
- 2014/15, 2022/23: Melbourne Renegades
- 2014/15–2015/16: Knights
- 2015/16–2016/17: Sydney Thunder
- 2016, 2018: Islamabad United
- 2016, 2019: Dhaka Dynamites
- 2023, 2024: Comilla Victorians
- 2022–present: Trinbago Knight Riders
- 2025: Rangpur Riders
- 2023–present: Los Angeles Knight Riders
- 2026-present: Biratnagar Kings

Career statistics
| Competition | ODI | T20I | LA | T20 |
|---|---|---|---|---|
| Matches | 56 | 86 | 93 | 563 |
| Runs scored | 1,034 | 1,122 | 1,953 | 9,360 |
| Batting average | 27.21 | 22.00 | 32.55 | 26.36 |
| 100s/50s | 0/4 | 0/3 | 2/8 | 2/33 |
| Top score | 92* | 71 | 132* | 121* |
| Balls bowled | 2,290 | 1,221 | 3,777 | 8,543 |
| Wickets | 70 | 61 | 131 | 485 |
| Bowling average | 31.84 | 31.45 | 26.09 | 25.86 |
| 5 wickets in innings | 0 | 0 | 4 | 1 |
| 10 wickets in match | 0 | 0 | 0 | 0 |
| Best bowling | 4/35 | 3/19 | 6/28 | 5/15 |
| Catches/stumpings | 11/– | 21/– | 22/– | 230/– |
Medal record
Men's Cricket
Representing West Indies
ICC Men's T20 World Cup
| Winner | 2012 Sri Lanka |
| Winner | 2016 India |
- Source: ESPNcricinfo, 22 July 2025

Andre Dwayne Russell (born 29 April 1988), nicknamed Dre Russ, is a Jamaican former international cricketer who has played international cricket for the West Indies and for Jamaica in domestic cricket as an all-rounder. He currently plays in various T20 leagues around the world and periodically represented the West Indies in T20is. Russell was part of the 2012 and 2016 ICC World T20 winning West Indies teams. Russell is considered as one of the greatest cricketers in the T20 format, notable for his powerful hitting, and capability to bowl at speeds consistently above 140 km/h.

== Domestic career ==
In 2010 Russell played at Barnards Green Cricket Club in Worcestershire, England, helping them secure promotion from Worcestershire Cricket League into Birmingham League cricket.

== International career ==
A fast bowling all-rounder, Russell made his Test cricket debut against Sri Lanka in November 2010. This is the only Test match of his career.

He made his One Day International (ODI) debut in the 2011 Cricket World Cup match against Ireland at Mohali. After a poor home series against Pakistan, he made his mark in the ODI series against India. After being dropped from the first two ODIs, he scored 92 not out off 64 balls in the 3rd ODI after coming to the crease at 96/7. In the 5th ODI at Sabina Park in Kingston, he was named the Player of the Match as he took 4/35 (from 8.3 overs) to dismiss India for 251 in 47.1 overs.

He was named in the 'Team of the Tournament' for the 2016 T20 World Cup by the ICC, ESPNcricinfo and Cricbuzz.

In April 2019, he was named in the West Indies' squad for the 2019 Cricket World Cup. In the West Indies match against Australia, Russell became the quickest batsman, in terms of balls faced, to score 1,000 runs in ODIs, facing only 767 deliveries. However, on 24 June 2019, Russell was ruled out of the rest of the tournament, due to a knee injury, and was replaced by Sunil Ambris.

On 9 July 2021, during the first T20I against Australia, Russell scored his maiden T20I half-century. He scored 51 off 28 balls and helped West Indies post 145 before being dismissed by Josh Hazlewood.

In September 2021, Russell was named in the West Indies' squad for the 2021 ICC Men's T20 World Cup.

On 13 December 2023, Russell made a comeback into the West Indies team after a two-year hiatus against England in the T20I series at home, getting the man of the match performance in his comeback match.

On 13 February, in the 3rd T20I against Australia, he scored his highest score in t20i's, 71(29) as he and Sherfane Rutherford kept the scoreboard ticking and had a partnership of 139 for the sixth wicket.

In May 2024, he was named in the West Indies squad for the 2024 ICC Men's T20 World Cup tournament. On 17 July 2025, he announced his retirement from all forms of international cricket.

== T20 franchise career ==
Russell has played in over 300 T20 matches and appeared for teams in a number of franchise leagues. He was also named in the T20 XI of the years 2016 and 2018 by ESPNcricinfo.

=== Indian Premier League ===
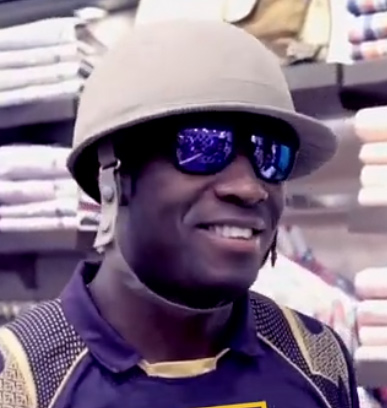
Andre Russell in India in 2015

During the 2012 Indian Premier League Players Auction, he was bought by the Delhi Daredevils for a sum of $450,000. Ahead of the 2014 season he was bought by Kolkata Knight Riders and has been seen as a key batsman for the team in the later overs of matches. For his performances in 2015, he was named in the ESPNcricinfo IPL XI for the season. He was on course to win the IPL Super Striker award in 2018, awarded for having the highest strike rate in the tournament, before being pipped by his teammate Sunil Narine. He eventually won it next year in the 2019 IPL, where he had a record IPL season strike rate of over 205, and was also announced as the Player of the Tournament. In an otherwise unsuccessful season, he emerged as both the highest run scorer and the highest wicket taker for his team, while also being the third-highest run-scorer in the tournament. He hit 52 sixes in the tournament; only Chris Gayle and Vaibhav Sooryavanshi have hit more sixes in any single season of the IPL. For his performances in the 2019 IPL season, he was named in the ESPNcricinfo IPL XI.

On 13 April 2021, he took figures of 5/15 off just two overs in a match against Mumbai Indians during the 2021 Indian Premier League. With the bat, he scored 9 runs off 15 balls as Kolkata lost the game by 10 runs.

Having played for the Knight Riders from IPL 2014 to IPL 2025, Russell announced his retirement from IPL cricket on 30 November 2025.

=== Other T20 leagues ===
On 16 August 2016 Russell scored the fastest Caribbean Premier League century, completing his 100 in 42 balls. He broke his own CPL record in 2018 with a century in 40 balls.

In May 2018, he was named as one of the ten marquee players for the first edition of the Global T20 Canada cricket tournament. He was selected to play for the Vancouver Knights.

In September 2018, he was named as the Icon Player for Nangarhar's squad in the first edition of the Afghanistan Premier League tournament. The following month, he was named in the squad for the Dhaka Dynamites in the 2018–19 Bangladesh Premier League. In June 2019, he was selected to play for the Vancouver Knights franchise team in the 2019 Global T20 Canada tournament.

In July 2020, he was named in the Jamaica Tallawahs squad for the 2020 Caribbean Premier League. In October 2020, he was drafted by the Colombo Kings for the inaugural edition of the Lanka Premier League. In April 2021, he was signed by Quetta Gladiators to play in the rescheduled matches in the 2021 Pakistan Super League.

Russell was picked by Southern Brave for the 2021 edition of The Hundred before he withdrew due to international commitments. In April 2022, he was bought by the Manchester Originals for the next season of The Hundred.

He plays for the Trinbago Knight Riders in the 2023 Republic bank Caribbean Premier League. He garnered a strike rate of 167.05 and contributed 11 wickets over 9 appearances to the Knight Riders making it to the finals. He was signed by Los Angeles Knight Riders for the inaugural edition of Major League Cricket.

On 3 February 2025, in the 11th edition of the BPL, Andre Russell joined Rangpur to play a playoff match. However, neither he nor his team performed well in that match resulting in Rangpur Riders elimination from the tournament.

He signed to the Biratnagar Kings of the Nepal Premier League in October 2026.

== Doping ==
According to the Jamaica Anti-Doping Commission (JADCO), in 2016 Russell committed an "anti-doping whereabouts" violation after missing three doping tests in a 12-month period. On 31 January 2017, Russell was banned from cricket for one year.

== Personal life ==
Russell was born on April 29, 1988 in Jamaica. Russell married American model Jassym Lora in 2016; the couple have a daughter.

== Outside cricket ==
In 2014, Russell began a second career as a recording artist under the name 'Dre Russ', with two singles released in November, one a collaboration with Beenie Man.
