= Amshi de Silva =

USA cricketer (born 2001)

Personal information
- Born: 11 November 2001 (age 25); Galle, Sri Lanka
- Batting: Right-handed
- Bowling: Right-arm medium fast

Domestic team information
- Years: Team
- 2021/22: Colombo Cricket Club
- 2022–2023: Nondescripts Cricket Club
- 2026–present: Texas Super Kings (squad no. 33)
- 2026: Trinbago Knight Riders
- Only List A: 27 October 2021 CCC v Burgher Recreation Club
- Source: Cricinfo, 27 October 2021

Amshi de Silva (born 11 November 2001) is a Sri Lankan cricketer. He made his List A debut on 27 October 2021, for Colombo Cricket Club in the 2021–22 Major Clubs Limited Over Tournament. Prior to his List A debut, he was named in Sri Lanka's squad for the 2020 Under-19 Cricket World Cup.

In April 2022, Sri Lanka Cricket (SLC) named him in the Sri Lanka Emerging Team's squad for their tour to England. On 25 May 2022, during the tour of England, he made his Twenty20 debut, against Surrey. In June 2022, he was named in the Sri Lanka A squad for their matches against Australia A during Australia's tour of Sri Lanka. He is a coach at All Stars Cricket Academy.

== Early life ==
He started his cricket career at the age of 10 when he was at Richmond College. He represented the under-13, under-15, under-17, and under-19 teams respectively, and captained the college's first xi team in 2021.
