= Oliver Peake =

Australian cricketer (born 2006)

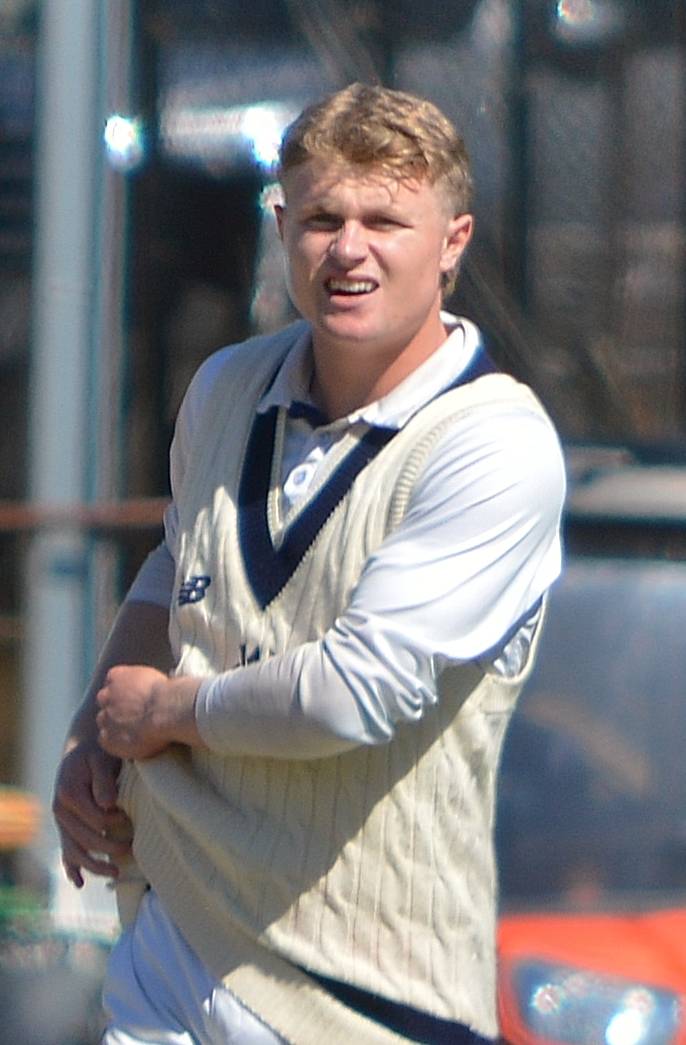
- Peake in 2026

Personal information
- Full name: Oliver John Peake
- Born: 11 September 2006 (age 20); Geelong, Victoria, Australia
- Batting: Left-handed
- Bowling: Right arm off spin
- Relatives: Clinton Peake (father)

International information
- National side: Australia (2026–present)
- ODI debut (cap 252): 30 May 2026 v Pakistan
- Last ODI: 18 September 2026 v Zimbabwe
- ODI shirt no.: 11

Domestic team information
- Years: Team
- 2024/25–present: Victoria
- 2024/25–present: Melbourne Renegades
- 2026: San Francisco Unicorns

Career statistics
Competition	ODI	FC	LA	T20
Matches	8	15	16	14
Runs scored	210	605	439	323
Batting average	30.00	25.20	33.76	26.91
100s/50s	0/0	0/5	0/3	0/1
Top score	48	92	73	57
Balls bowled	54	138	78	1
Wickets	1	0	2	0
Bowling average	48.00	–	38.50	–
5 wickets in innings	0	–	0	–
10 wickets in match	0	–	0	–
Best bowling	1/29	–	1/9	–
Catches/stumpings	0/–	8/–	2/–	6/–
- Source: Cricinfo, 25 October 2026

Oliver John Peake (born 11 September 2006) is a professional Australian cricketer who has represented Australia in One Day International cricket, and plays Australian domestic cricket for Victoria and the Melbourne Renegades. He is a left-handed batsman and right-arm off-break bowler.

== Early life ==
Born in Geelong in Victoria, Peake attended St Joseph's College and later Geelong Grammar School on a sporting scholarship. His father is former Victorian cricketer Clinton Peake.

Peake also played Australian rules football as a junior, playing junior football for St Mary's Sporting Club, and also played 2 matches for the Geelong Falcons at under-16 level in the Talent League before focusing on cricket.

== Domestic career ==
Peake played with South Barwon Cricket Club, playing for two seasons with his father, before going on to play for Geelong Cricket Club in Victorian Premier Cricket. He was named the Australian Cricket Society Male Young Cricketer of the Year in October 2024.

In November 2024, he was selected to play second XI cricket for Victoria. On 18 January 2025, he made his Big Bash League debut for Melbourne Renegades against Brisbane Heat. Peake also made his first-class debut in that same season, playing Victoria's final Sheffield Shield match of the 2024-25 season, against Western Australia at the WACA Ground. Peake top scored for Victoria in the first innings, with a contribution of 52. He was awarded a rookie state contract in May 2025. The following month, he signed his first full BBL contract with the Melbourne Renegades.

On 15 December 2025, Peake scored his first BBL half century in his second match, against Brisbane Heat, scoring 57 from 29 balls.

Peake joined the San Francisco Unicorns for the 2026 Major League Cricket season, his first overseas franchise T20 deal. He also played for the franchise in the 2026 Global Super League, an invitational Twenty20 competition held annually in Guyana.

== International career ==
Peake was a member of the Australia national under-19 cricket team that won the 2024 Under-19 Cricket World Cup in South Africa. Initially named as a non-travelling reserve for the World Cup, he was promoted into the squad when Corey Wasley broke a finger in the opening match. Peake became the youngest member of the winning team and contributed 49 runs against Pakistan in the semi final before playing in the final in which he scored 46 not out against India.

Peake, as an 18-year old who was yet to make his first-class debut, was invited to join Australia's 2025 test tour of Sri Lanka in February to gain experience around the team and in subcontinent conditions. Later that year in July, he was a part of the Australia A squad to play 3 List A and 2 First Class matches against Sri Lanka A in Darwin. He scored an unbeaten 55 from 38 balls in his first outing for the team, the first List A match of the series.

In December 2025, Peake was chosen to captain the Australian team in the 2026 Under-19 Men's Cricket World Cup in Namibia and Zimbabwe in January and February 2026. In May 2026, he was again included with the senior Australia squad for a T20 tour of Bangladesh.

Peake was called up to his first international squad for Australia's 3-match One Day International tour of Pakistan in May–June 2026. Peake's selection for the first match of the series saw him become the youngest specialist batsman, and fourth youngest cricketer, to ever play ODI cricket for Australia, at the age of 19 years and 261 days. Peake made 7 off 15 balls on debut at Rawalpindi Cricket Stadium, as Australia lost to Pakistan by 5 wickets.
