= Los Angeles Knight Riders =

Los Angeles-based cricket franchise

- Nickname: Knights/LAKR
- League: Major League Cricket

Personnel
- Captain: Jason Holder
- Coach: Dwayne Bravo
- Owner: Knight Riders Group
- Manager: Wayne Bentley

Team information
- Colours: Purple and Gold
- Founded: 2020; 6 years ago
- Home ground: Knight Riders Cricket Ground, Pomona, California

History
- MLC wins: 1 (2026)
- Official website: https://www.lakriders.us/
T20 kit

Knight Riders Group

Current Teams
- Kolkata Knight Riders (2008–present) 🏆×3 (2012, 2014, 2024); Trinbago Knight Riders (2015–present) 🏆×5 (2015, 2017, 2018, 2020, 2025); Trinbago Knight Riders Women (2022–present) 🏆×1 (2022); Abu Dhabi Knight Riders (2023–present); Los Angeles Knight Riders (2023–present) 🏆×1 (2026)

Stadium
- Knight Riders Cricket Ground (2026–present)

Defunct Teams
- Cape Town Knight Riders (2017)

The Los Angeles Knight Riders are an American professional Twenty20 cricket team based in the Greater Los Angeles area that competes in Major League Cricket (MLC). The team's home ground as of the 2026 season is the Knight Riders Cricket Ground at Fairplex in Pomona, California. They won their first MLC title in 2026.

The franchise is owned by the Knight Riders Group, a sporting subsidiary alliance between Red Chillies Entertainment and the Mehta Group. The Knight Riders' minor league affiliate—the Los Angeles Lashings compete in Minor League Cricket.

== History ==
=== Background ===
In December 2020, it was announced by Major League Cricket that the Knight Riders Group had bought a stake in their league, and as a result, was given ownership rights to the LA Knight Riders. Plans for the team were reaffirmed in April 2021 with CEO Venky Mysore stating that the team would even have their own stadium. More plans on this stadium would be revealed nearly a year later in April 2022, with plans for a 10,000-seat cricket stadium costing $30 million.

In July 2022, Mysore reaffirmed once again his intent of starting a brand in L.A. stating that, "we [the Knight Riders Group] also made a big investment in... MLC where we were involved from the inception of the idea. We'll be setting up [the] LA Knight Riders and we're also building a stadium [there]...". In November later that year, the 2023 season of MLC was officially announced. Shortly thereafter, in March 2023, more information about the LA Knight Riders was revealed, including the unveiling of its team logo.

On July 1, 2026, the Knight Riders opened their home cricket ground, the Knight Riders Cricket Ground in Pomona, California.

=== 2023 season ===
Prior to the launch of the official season, it was announced the MLC's inaugural domestic draft would take place on March 19, 2023. The Knight Riders had the final pick of the draft and selected the Hurricanes' Ali Khan as their first draft pick. Over the course of the draft, the Knight Riders selected various players including the likes of Unmukt Chand, Corné Dry, and Saif Badar. The Knight Riders announced their full squad on June 13, with England's Jason Roy, Australia's Adam Zampa, West Indies' Sunil Narine and New Zealand's Lockie Ferguson all in the mix. Mysore, upon the squad's unveiling, stated that, "we have assembled a strong and talented team for the debut season of MLC, who can compete at the highest level and bring joy to cricket fans around the world". On July 10, team management announced that Narine would lead the team as the captain and that Phil Simmons would be the team's head coach. Alongside Simmons, Bharat Arun and Ryan ten Doeschate were subsequently announced as the team's bowling and batting coaches, respectively.

=== 2024 season ===
Ahead of the 2024 season opener on July 5, the Knight Riders retained a vast majority of their squad, including Roy, Narine, and Chand. The team also signed various overseas and domestic players, consisting of the likes of Bangladeshi Shakib al Hasan and local boy Matthew Tromp.

=== 2026 season ===
The 2026 MLC season saw the opening of Knight Riders Cricket Ground, the first permanent home for the team. The venue hosted the third round of play from July 1 to July 5, totaling seven matches. The Knight Riders finished the season second in the table, defeating the San Francisco Unicorns in the qualifier, and the Washington Freedom in the final to claim the team's first MLC championship.

== Current squad ==
- Players with international caps are listed in **bold**.
- Direct signings are players that have been bought by the team for undisclosed prices overseas.

Los Angeles Knight Riders roster
Position	Name	Nationality	Date of birth (age)	Batting style	Bowling style	Year signed	Notes
Batters	**Alex Hales**	England	January 3, 1989 (age 37)	Right-handed	Right-arm medium	2025	Direct signing
Batters	**Sherfane Rutherford**	West Indies	15 August 1998 (age 28)	Left-handed	Right-arm fast medium	2025	Direct Signing
Batters	**Nitish Kumar**	United States	May 21, 1994 (age 32)	Right-handed	Right-arm off-break	2023	
Batters	Saif Badar	Pakistan	July 3, 1998 (age 28)	Right-handed	Right-arm legbreak	2023	
Batters	Unmukt Chand	United States	March 26, 1993 (age 33)	Right-handed	Right-arm off-break	2023	
Batters	**Rovman Powell**	West Indies	July 23, 1993 (age 33)	Right-handed	Right-arm medium-fast	2025	Direct Signing
Batters	**Andre Fletcher**	West Indies	November 28, 1987 (age 38)	Right-handed	Right-arm medium-fast	2025	Direct Signing
All-Rounders	**Andre Russell**	West Indies	April 29, 1988 (age 38)	Right-handed	Right-arm fast	2023	
All-Rounders	**Shadley van Schalkwyk**	United States	August 5, 1988 (age 38)	Left-handed	Right-arm medium	2023	
All-Rounders	**Sunil Narine**	West Indies	May 26, 1988 (age 38)	Left-handed	Right-arm off-break	2023	Vice-captain
All-Rounders	Matthew Tromp	United States	April 1, 2005 (age 21)	Right-handed	Right-arm medium-fast	2024	
All-Rounders	**Jason Holder**	West Indies	November 5, 1991 (age 34)	Right-handed	Right-arm medium-fast	2025	Captain
All-Rounders	Karthik Gattepalli	United States	April 25, 2000 (age 26)	Left hand Bat	Slow Left arm Orthodox	2025	Draft Signing
Wicket-Keepers	Aditya Ganesh	United States	October 9, 1991 (age 35)	Left-handed		2024	
Bowlers	**Tanveer Sangha**	Australia	November 26, 2001 (age 24)	Right-handed	Right-arm legbreak	2025	Direct signing
Bowlers	**Ali Khan**	United States	December 13, 1990 (age 35)	Right-handed	Right-arm fast-medium	2023	
Bowlers	Corne Dry	South Africa	February 4, 1993 (age 33)	Right-handed	Right-arm fast-medium	2024	
Bowlers	**Spencer Johnson**	Australia	December 16, 1995 (age 30)	Left-handed	Left-arm fast	2023	
Bowlers	**Anrich Nortje**	South Africa	November 16, 1993 (age 32)	Right-handed	Right-arm fast	2025	Direct Signing

== Administration and support staff ==
Position	Name
Head coach	Dwayne Bravo
Assistant coach	Carl Crowe
Bowling coach	Ottis Gibson
Fielding coach	Gibran Mohammed
Mentor	Shane Watson
Team Manager	Wayne Bentley
Analyst	Lokesh Vijay
Physiotherapists	Prasanth Panchada; Ruel Rigsby
Strength and conditioning coach	Sagar VM

== Performance ==
=== Standings and season summary ===
Year	Played	Wins	Losses	NR	League standing	Final standing
2023	5	1	4	0	6th	League stage
2024	7	2	4	1	5th	League Stage
2025	10	2	8	0	6th	League Stage
2026	12	8	4	0	2nd	Champions

=== Team statistics ===
Opponents	Period	Played	Wins	Losses	NR
MI New York	2023–	5	0	5	0
San Francisco Unicorns	2023–	6	2	3	1
Seattle Orcas	2023–	7	4	3	0
Texas Super Kings	2023–	5	2	3	0
Washington Freedom	2023–	6	1	5	0

== Ground ==
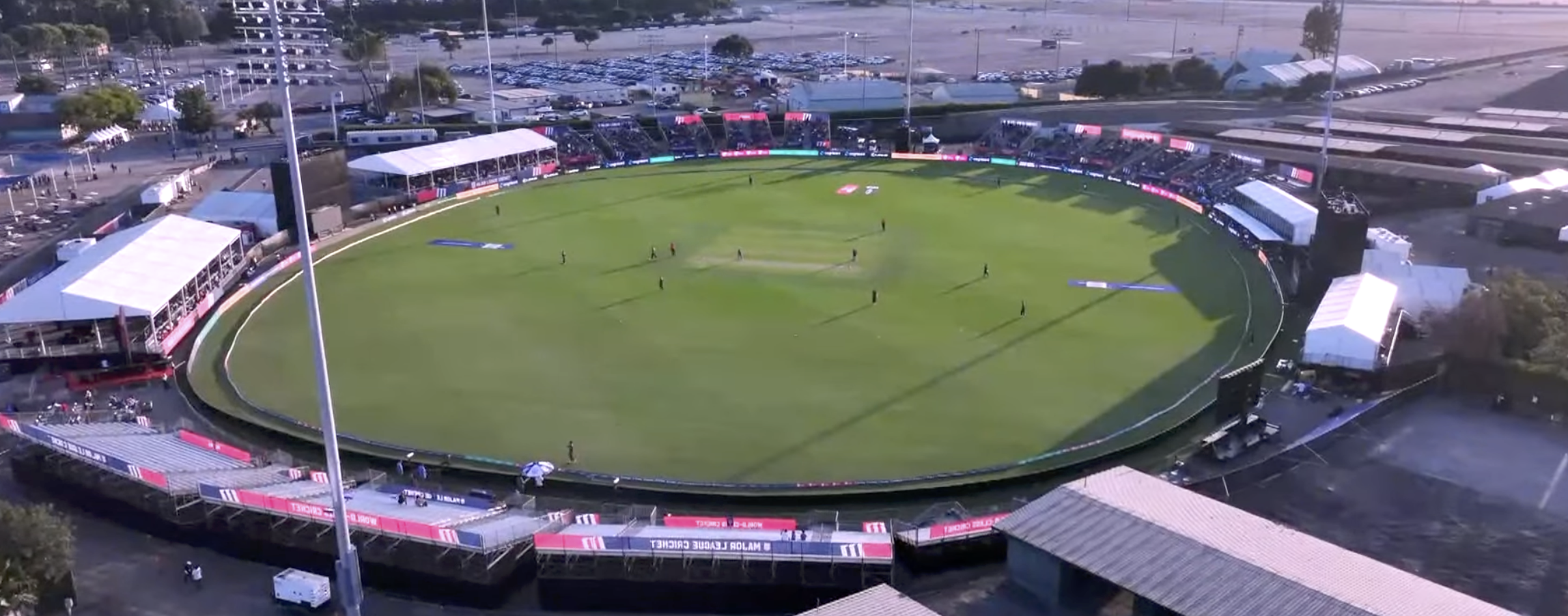
An aerial view of the Knight Riders Cricket Field, the home ground of the Los Angeles Knight riders

The Los Angeles Knight Riders host games at Knight Riders Cricket Ground, built at the Fairplex in Pomona, California. Opened in 2026, the venue has a current capacity of 5,000, though the venue is designed to be expandable up to 20,000 ahead of the 2028 Summer Olympics.

== Knight Riders Group ==
- Kolkata Knight Riders
- Trinbago Knight Riders (Men's)
- Trinbago Knight Riders (Women's)
- Abu Dhabi Knight Riders
