= Sujit Nayak =

Indian cricketer (born 1989)

Personal information
- Full name: Sujit Surendra Nayak
- Born: 23 June 1989 (age 37); Bombay, Maharashtra, India
- Batting: Left-handed
- Bowling: Slow left-arm orthodox

Domestic team information
- Years: Team
- 2012: Mumbai Indians
- 2013-: Delhi Daredevils
- Source: ESPNcricinfo, 8 July 2013

Sujit Nayak (born 23 June 1989, full name Sujit Surendra Nayak) is an Indian cricketer who plays for Mumbai in the C.K Nayudu Trophy. He was born in Bombay (now Mumbai). He was bought by Mumbai Indians for the 2012 Indian Premier League (IPL) and the Delhi Daredevils for the 2013 IPL. He made his List A debut on 27 February 2014, for Mumbai in the 2013–14 Vijay Hazare Trophy.
