= Major League Cricket =

American professional cricket league

- Countries: United States
- Administrator: American Cricket Enterprises
- Format: Twenty20
- First edition: 2023
- Latest edition: 2026
- Next edition: 2027
- Tournament format: Double Round-robin and playoffs
- Number of teams: 6
- Current champion: Los Angeles Knight Riders (1st title)
- Most successful: MI New York (2 titles)
- Most runs: Nicholas Pooran (1,352)
- Most wickets: Trent Boult (54)
- TV: List of broadcasters
- Website: majorleaguecricket.com

Major League Cricket (MLC), also known as Cognizant Major League Cricket for sponsorship reasons, is a professional Twenty20 (T20) cricket league in the United States. It is organized by American Cricket Enterprises (ACE) and sanctioned by USA Cricket. Founded in 2023, the league operates as a single entity consisting of six city-based franchises, each run by individual investor groups.

The inaugural season took place over three weeks at Grand Prairie Stadium in Grand Prairie, Texas, and Church Street Park in Morrisville, North Carolina, concluding on July 30, 2023. In 2025, it was announced that MLC would expand its host venues to include the Oakland Coliseum (former home of MLB’s Oakland A’s and the NFL’s Oakland Raiders) in Oakland, California, and Central Broward Park in Lauderhill, Florida. Church Street Park did not return for the 2025 season.

As of 2026, MLC has completed four seasons. The Los Angeles Knight Riders are the current defending champions, having defeated the Washington Freedom in the 2026 final. MLC also oversees a developmental league, Minor League Cricket (MiLC), which launched in 2021 ahead of MLC’s debut.

== History ==
There have been various attempts to hold a Twenty20 (T20) cricket league in the United States, such as the short-lived Pro Cricket (which played a single season in 2004), and the American Premier League, a proposed league in partnership between the United States of America Cricket Association (USACA) and New Zealand Cricket.

=== Formation: 2018–2021 ===
In November 2018, USA Cricket announced that it was seeking partners to establish a domestic T20 league in the country by 2021, with goals to "engage existing fans and grow new ones", and spur "sustainable development of cricketing infrastructure across the United States". In May 2019, USA Cricket accepted a bid by American Cricket Enterprises (ACE) for a US$1 billion investment, covering the league and other investments benefitting the US national teams. Its partners include Satyan Gajwani and Vineet Jain of the Times Group and Willow TV founders Sameer Mehta and Vijay Srinivasan. As part of the agreement, ACE also handles commercial activities for T20I and ODI matches hosted by the United States.

In January 2019, USA Cricket was approved as the new governing board for cricket in USA, replacing the USACA, which had been expelled from the International Cricket Council in September 2017 due to governance issues. The new body set a goal for cricket to reach wider, mainstream popularity in the country, where it has typically been considered a niche international sport.

In an annual general meeting on February 21, 2020, it was stated that USA Cricket planned to launch Major League Cricket in 2021, and a 22-team development league known as Minor League Cricket that summer as a prelude. Minor League Cricket was officially announced the following week, with plans to host a nine-week, 170-game season beginning July 4; however, it was postponed to 2021 due to the COVID-19 pandemic in the United States.

In October 2020 USA Cricket reaffirmed plans to launch Major League Cricket in 2022 as part of its "foundational plan" for 2020–23. On December 1, 2020, it was announced that the IPL's Kolkata Knight Riders (co-owned by Bollywood actor Shah Rukh Khan) would invest in ACE.

In February 2021 MLC announced plans for Minor League Cricket Youth and Major League Cricket Youth leagues, which would, alongside a MLC Jr. Championship and player development program, serve as a development system for younger players to progress towards Major League Cricket and the national team. In May 2021, the launch of Major League Cricket was delayed to 2023 due to COVID-19 and to provide additional time to develop facilities.

=== Launch: 2022–2023 ===
In May 2022 Major League Cricket announced it had acquired funds of US$120 million as part of its Series A and A1 fundraising rounds. Investors committing to MLC featured the likes of Microsoft CEO Satya Nadella, Ross Perot Jr., Anand Rajaraman, Shantanu Narayen and more. MLC plans to use these funds to mainly build stadiums and first-class facilities in the hopes of accelerating cricket's development across the United States.

In June 2022 MLC announced the inaugural season of Minor League Cricket Youth (MiLC Youth). The inaugural season of MiLC Youth was announced to be contested between eleven teams at the Prairie View Cricket Complex in Houston starting July 25, 2022. The finals for the inaugural season took place on July 29 at between the Dallas Mustangs and the New Jersey Stallions, in which the Stallions beat the Mustangs by two wickets.

In November 2022, it was announced the first season of MLC will be staged from July 13–30, 2023, at Grand Prairie Stadium in Grand Prairie, Dallas, USA. The tournament will be played in a single round-robin format with 15 league matches played among six franchises before a four-match play-off phase. MLC also hopes to play matches in a to-be-constructed stadium in Los Angeles, and Church Street Park in Morrisville, North Carolina.

In February 2023, it was announced that the player draft for the league's inaugural season would be held on March 19, 2023.

The inaugural player draft was held on March 19, 2023, at the NASA Johnson Space Center in Houston. The draft was conducted over 9 rounds via a serpentine system, where the team order is reversed every round. Out of the 9 rounds, 8 were general draft picks, with the final round being exclusively for U-23 players. Each of the six teams had a purse of over $1 million, with $800,000 for overseas players and $300,000 for US-based players. The draft had a fixed salary cap with a maximum of $75,000 (first round) and a minimum of $2,500 (ninth round). Overseas signings were directly signed and were not part of the draft. Each franchise must have a minimum of fifteen players, with the maximum being eighteen. Out of these eighteen players, a maximum of nine can be overseas players.

Following the draft, it was reported that USAC had not yet sanctioned either Major or Minor League Cricket for the 2023 season, with the ICC stating that its members should not issue No Objection Certificates (NOCs) to release players to participate at this time. Interim chairman of the board Atul Rai citing unspecified concerns and outstanding issues over how ACE is administering the competitions, including wanting to seek a more "favorable" short-term agreement. MLC director Justin Geale stated that the sanctioning applications were with USA Cricket", and that "the recent staffing changes at USA Cricket may have contributed to any delays. In April 2023, the league was officially sanctioned by the ICC, removing a significant obstacle to the league launching in July. Play began on July 13, 2023.

=== Growth: 2024–present ===
In December 2023, four days after the conclusion of the 2024 ICC Men's T20 World Cup, it was announced that MLC's season would begin on July 5, 2024. It was also reported that the matches would be played in Grand Prairie Stadium, along with other venues. In March, Cognizant was named as the title sponsor for the league from the 2024 season.

In May 2024, the ICC granted the tournament official List A status, resulting in the official recognition of the tournament as a "T20 league" and tournament playing records now being counted as official format statistics. Vijay Srinivasan, MLC's chief executive, later emphasized ambitions to expand the tournament to 10 teams and to increase the number of matches played and provide the prediction tips. Srinivasan stepped down from his role in January 2025, with former Cricket West Indies CEO Johnny Grave appointed as his successor.

MLC announced in April 2025 that it would move its headquarters from San Francisco to Grand Prairie. The announcement came a day after the unveiling of a partnership between the league and New Zealand Cricket to form a new team by 2027, and a month after a deal to host matches at the Oakland Coliseum. The 2025 season expanded from a 19-game season to 34, and moved its opening day to early-June to reduce overlap with other leagues, particularly The Hundred.

== Teams ==
Current Major League Cricket teams

MLC began with six teams and uses a single-entity structure under which all teams are owned by ACE, with investor-operator assigned to each team. It plans to expand to ten teams in the future.

USA Cricket's CEO Iain Higgins identified Atlanta, Chicago, Los Angeles, New Jersey, New York City, and San Francisco as markets where the sport was most popular. The league's six inaugural teams are assigned to Dallas, Los Angeles, New York, San Francisco, Seattle, and Washington, D.C.

=== List of current teams ===
Team	City	Stadium	Capacity	Founded	Captain	Coach	Owners
Los Angeles Knight Riders	Pomona, California	Knight Riders Cricket Ground	5,000	2023	Jason Holder	Dwayne Bravo	Knight Riders Group
MI New York		Travel team		2023	Nicholas Pooran	Mark Boucher	Indiawin Sports
San Francisco Unicorns	Oakland, California	Oakland Coliseum	12,000	2023	Matthew Short	Cameron White	Anand Rajaraman; Venky Harinarayan
Seattle Orcas		Travel team		2023	Marcus Stoinis	Adam Voges	GMR Group; S. Somasegar; Satya Nadella (Note: Although there are numerous other investors backing the team (such as Soma Somasegar and Sanjay Parthasarathy), Nadella and the GMR Group are the team's main stakeholders and investors.)
Texas Super Kings	Grand Prairie, Texas	Grand Prairie Stadium	15,000	2023	Faf du Plessis	Stephen Fleming	Chennai Super Kings; Anurag Jain; Ross Perot Jr.
Washington Freedom		Travel team		2023	Steven Smith	Ricky Ponting	Sanjay Govil (Note: Although Govil has launched a strategic partnership with Cricket NSW, it is understood that there is no ownership element in the deal.)

== Tournament season and results ==
MLC season winner
Season	Final			
Season	Winner	Result	Runners-up	Venue
2023	MI New York; 184/3 (16 overs)	MI New York won by 7 wickets Scorecard	Seattle Orcas; 183/9 (20 overs)	Grand Prairie Stadium, Texas
2024	Washington Freedom; 207/5 (20 overs)	Washington Freedom won by 96 runs Scorecard	San Francisco Unicorns; 111 (16 overs)	Grand Prairie Stadium, Texas
2025	MI New York; 180/7 (20 overs)	MI New York won by 5 runs Scorecard	Washington Freedom; 175/5 (20 overs)	Grand Prairie Stadium, Texas
2026	Los Angeles Knight Riders; 164 (19.4 overs)	Los Angeles Knight Riders won by 1 run Scorecard	Washington Freedom; 163/9 (20 overs)	Oakland Coliseum, California

== Teams' performances ==
Seasons Teams	2023	2024	2025	2026
Los Angeles Knight Riders	6th	5th	6th	1st
MI New York	1st	4th	1st	4th
San Francisco Unicorns	5th	2nd	4th	3rd
Seattle Orcas	2nd	6th	5th	5th
Texas Super Kings	3rd	3rd	3rd	6th
Washington Freedom	4th	1st	2nd	2nd

== Venues ==
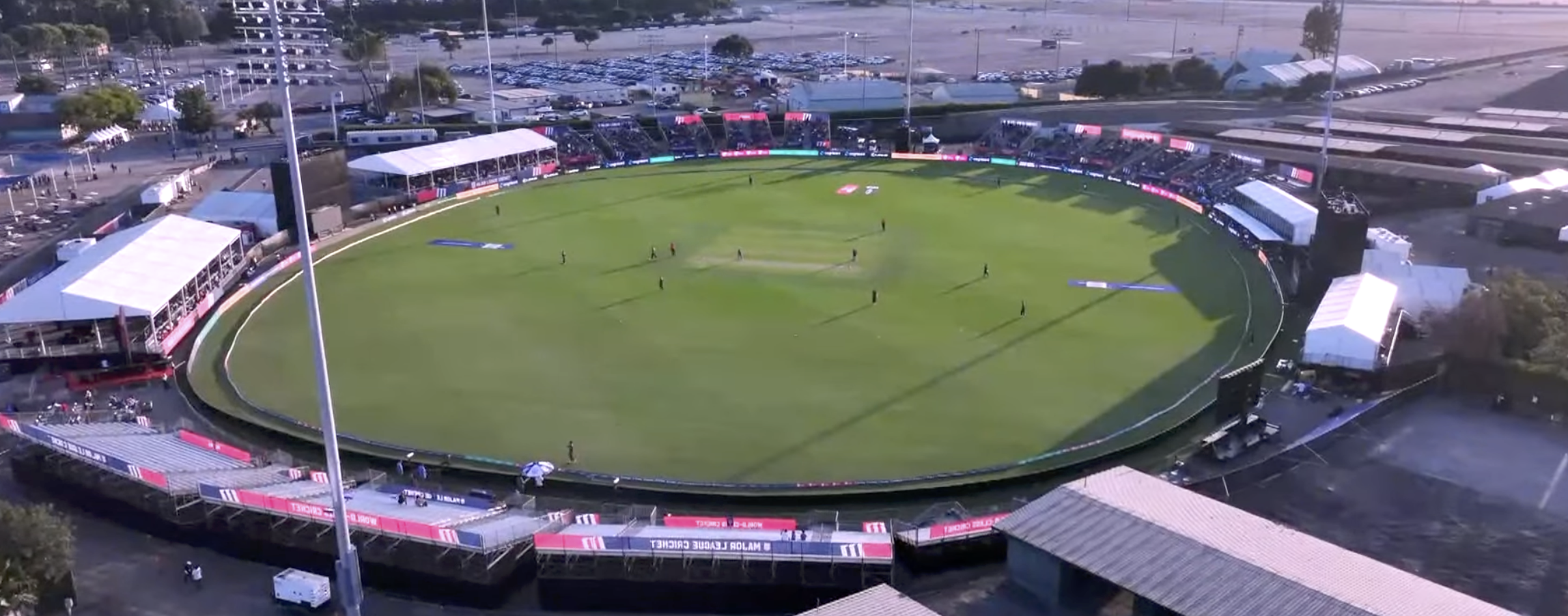
Opened in 2026, the Knight Riders Cricket Ground in Los Angeles is the home of the Los Angeles Knight Riders.

On November 18, 2020, it was announced that ACE would lease AirHogs Stadium in Grand Prairie, Texas—home of the former Texas AirHogs independent baseball team—and convert it to a cricket-specific facility that will host a Grand Prairie-based team in Major League Cricket.

In March 2022, ACE discussed plans to invest $110 million in eight newly constructed or renovated venues for the league and possible hosting of matches during the 2024 ICC Men's T20 World Cup (which the United States co-hosted with the West Indies), including the aforementioned Grand Prairie Stadium, Church Street Park in Morrisville, Moosa Stadium in Pearland, Prairie View Cricket Complex in Prairie View, and new sites at Great Park in Irvine, California (Knight Riders), the Santa Clara County Fairgrounds (Unicorns), and Marymoor Park in Redmond, Washington (Orcas). The renovated venues have a budget of approximately $3 million each, while the three new west coast venues have a budget of $30 million each; ACE stated that the west coast venues would be completed by 2024, and will have a projected capacity of 10,000–20,000. As of November 2022, it was reported that work on the other proposed pitches had not yet commenced.

In February 2023, it was reported that most of the 2023 matches were set to be played in Grand Prairie, with Church Street Park set to be used as a secondary venue. Due to the summer heat in Texas, it was reported by Cricinfo that most matches would be scheduled in the evening, rather than scheduled in the daytime hours to attract audiences in markets such as India. With the announcement of the 2023 schedule, it was confirmed that a portion of the group stage would be played at Church Street Park; due to a curfew on the use of floodlights, these matches will begin in the early evening. This was true for the 2024 season as well, with matches again being played in Grand Prairie and Morrisville.

For the 2025 season, MLC split its matches between Grand Prairie and, for the first time, Central Broward Park (which had long-been the United States' only major cricket stadium) and the Oakland Coliseum (former home stadium of the Athletics of Major League Baseball).

In March 2026, the Knight Riders Group announced that it would construct the Knight Riders Cricket Ground at the Fairplex in Pomona, California, with construction beginning the following month. The stadium opened on July 1, 2026 and it is scheduled to host cricket at the 2028 Summer Olympics in Los Angeles. It is expected to host seven matches during the 2026 season.

MLC venues
Season	Venue 1	Venue 2	Venue 3	No. of venues
2023	Grand Prairie Stadium	Church Street Park	–	2
2024	Grand Prairie Stadium	Church Street Park	–	2
2025	Grand Prairie Stadium	Oakland Coliseum	Central Broward Park	3
2026	Grand Prairie Stadium	Oakland Coliseum	Knight Riders Cricket Ground	3

== Broadcasters ==
In the United States, MLC matches are broadcast by Willow. In the inaugural season, selected matches were sub-licensed to CBS Sports Network. Internet based television service Sling TV also streamed matches as part of its sponsorship agreement with the league.

Beginning in the 2024 season, MLC began to sub-license team-oriented packages of matches to regional sports networks, beginning with YES Network (MI New York) and Monumental Sports Network (Washington Freedom). In 2025, a similar agreement was reached with NBC Sports Bay Area and California for San Francisco Unicorns matches.

International providers include Sky Sports (Previously Premier Sports and TNT Sports)in the UK and Ireland, ARY in Pakistan, and Prime Video in Australia and New Zealand.

=== List of broadcasters (2026 season) ===
Territory	Outlets
Unsold markets	YouTube
United States	Willow TV, YES Network (MI New York matches), Monumental Sports Network (Washington Freedom matches), NBC Sports Bay Area/California (San Francisco Unicorns matches)
Canada	Willow TV
Australia	7plus, 7mate (Final only)
Middle East and North Africa and Southeast Asia	Cricbuzz
Sub-Saharan Africa	ESPN
United Kingdom and Ireland	Sky Sports
India	Star Sport (Television), JioHotstar (OTT)

== Records and statistics ==
Major League Cricket records
Category	Statistic	Record holder	Value
Batting records	Most runs	Faf du Plessis	1,128
Batting records	Highest score	Mitchell Owen	155
Bowling records	Most wickets	Trent Boult	52
Fielding	Most dismissals (wicket-keeper)	Quinton de Kock	26
Fielding	Most catches (fielder)	Glenn Maxwell	17
Team records	Highest total	Washington	270/4, vs MI New York
Team records	Lowest total	Los Angeles	50, vs MI New York
Team records	Highest run chase	Washington	270/4, vs MI New York

== Minor League Cricket ==
Minor League Cricket is a developmental league for Major League Cricket that completed its inaugural season in 2021. It consists of 26 franchise-based teams in four regional divisions.
