= 2014 Cricket World Cup Qualifier =

Cricket tournament

2014 ICC Cricket World Cup Qualifier
- Dates: 13 January – 1 February 2014
- Administrator: International Cricket Council
- Cricket format: One Day International List A cricket
- Tournament format(s): Round-robin and Knockout
- Host: New Zealand
- Champions: Scotland (2nd title)
- Runners-up: United Arab Emirates
- Participants: 10
- Matches: 34
- Player of the series: (Scotland) Preston Mommsen
- Most runs: (United Arab Emirates) Khurram Khan (581)
- Most wickets: (Hong Kong) Haseeb Amjad (20)
- Official website: www.icc-cricket.com

The 2014 ICC Cricket World Cup Qualifier was a cricket tournament that formed the final part of the qualification process for the 2015 World Cup. The top two teams qualified for the World Cup, joining Ireland and for the first time Afghanistan, both of whom had already qualified through the 2011–13 ICC World Cricket League Championship and maintained their ODI status. The World Cup Qualifier was the final event of the 2009–14 World Cricket League. Scotland was originally scheduled to host the tournament in July and August 2013. It was staged in New Zealand, from 13 January to 1 February 2014 after Scotland relinquished the right to host it.

The tournament saw Scotland, who won the final against the UAE, qualifying for their 3rd World Cup and retaining their ODI status/ As runners-up, the UAE also qualified for the World Cup, their second time at the event, and gained ODI status. Despite not qualifying for the World Cup, Hong Kong and Papua New Guinea gained ODI status for the first time by finishing the tournament in 3rd and 4th places, respectively.

The tournament also saw leading associate countries Kenya, the Netherlands and Canada fail to qualify for the World Cup and lose their ODI status till 2018, although the Netherlands did qualify for the 2014 ICC World Twenty20 instead of Scotland.

== Format ==
According to ICC "the 10 teams were to be equally divided into two groups with the top three sides from each group progressing to the Super Six stage. The top two sides from the Super Six stage would not only reach the final but would also qualify for the ICC Cricket World Cup 2015 to complete the 14-team tally. Top 4 team would get ODI status where as 5th, 6th, 7th & 8th placed teams would remain or be relegated to Division 2"

== Teams ==
The tournament followed the conclusion of the 2011–13 ICC World Cricket League Championship. The top two teams from this tournament, Ireland and Afghanistan, qualified for the 2015 World Cup, with the remaining six teams entering the World Cup Qualifier. They were joined by the third and fourth-placed teams from 2011 ICC World Cricket League Division Two and the top two teams from 2013 ICC World Cricket League Division Three.

Team	Qualification
United Arab Emirates	3rd in 2011–13 ICC World Cricket League Championship
Netherlands	4th in 2011–13 ICC World Cricket League Championship
Scotland	5th in 2011–13 ICC World Cricket League Championship
Kenya	6th in 2011–13 ICC World Cricket League Championship
Namibia	7th in 2011–13 ICC World Cricket League Championship
Canada	8th in 2011–13 ICC World Cricket League Championship
Papua New Guinea	3rd in 2011 ICC World Cricket League Division Two, UAE
Hong Kong	4th in 2011 ICC World Cricket League Division Two, UAE
Nepal	1st in 2013 ICC World Cricket League Division Three, Bermuda
Uganda	2nd in 2013 ICC World Cricket League Division Three, Bermuda

== Venues ==
Christchurch	Lincoln	Mount Maunganui	2014 Cricket World Cup Qualifier is located in New Zealand
Hagley Oval	Bert Sutcliffe Oval	Bay Oval	2014 Cricket World Cup Qualifier is located in New Zealand
Capacity: 20,000	Capacity: N/A	Capacity: 10,000	2014 Cricket World Cup Qualifier is located in New Zealand
New Plymouth	Rangiora	Queenstown	2014 Cricket World Cup Qualifier is located in New Zealand
Pukekura Park	Rangiora Recreation Ground	Queenstown Events Centre	2014 Cricket World Cup Qualifier is located in New Zealand
Capacity: N/A	Capacity: N/A	Capacity: 19,000	2014 Cricket World Cup Qualifier is located in New Zealand

== Match officials ==
Officiating the tournament were three match referees and in all during the tournament, there were 14 umpires who would officiate, including Marais Erasmus of the Emirates Elite Panel of ICC Umpires while the remaining 13 representatives were from the Emirates International Panel of ICC Umpires and the ICC Associates and Affiliates Umpires' Panel.

Umpires

- (Pakistan) Ahsan Raza
- (New Zealand) Billy Bowden
- (South Africa) Johan Cloete
- (South Africa) Marais Erasmus
- (New Zealand) Chris Gaffaney
- (South Africa) Shaun George
- (England) Michael Gough
- (India) Vineet Kulkarni
- (Australia) Mick Martell
- (Bangladesh) Enamul Haque
- (Cricket West Indies) Peter Nero
- (England) Tim Robinson
- (Cricket West Indies) Joel Wilson
- (Sri Lanka) Ruchira Palliyaguru

Match referees

- (New Zealand) Jeff Crowe
- (Sri Lanka) Roshan Mahanama
- (South Africa) Dev Govindjee

== Players ==
Canada	Hong Kong	Nepal	Scotland	United Arab Emirates
Jimmy Hansra (c); Harvir Baidwan; Trevin Bastiampillai; Khurram Chohan; Parth Desai; Nikhil Dutta; Jeremy Gordon; Ruvindu Gunasekera; Nitish Kumar; Usman Limbada; Cecil Pervez; Raza-ur-Rehman; Junaid Siddiqui; Zeeshan Siddiqi; Hamza Tariq	Jamie Atkinson (c); Tanwir Afzal; Irfan Ahmed; Nadeem Ahmed; Haseeb Amjad; Waqas Barkat; Mark Chapman; Mark Ferguson; Babar Hayat; Aizaz Khan; Nizakat Khan; Courtney Kruger; Ankur Sharma; Mark Wright	Paras Khadka (c); Pradeep Airee; Prithu Baskota; Binod Bhandari; Mahesh Chhetri; Shakti Gauchan; Sompal Kami; Avinash Karn; Subash Khakurel; Gyanendra Malla; Anil Mandal; Jitendra Mukhiya; Sagar Pun; Basanta Regmi; Sharad Vesawkar	Kyle Coetzer (c); Richie Berrington; Freddie Coleman; Matthew Cross; Gordon Drummond; Gordon Goudie; Majid Haq; Moneeb Iqbal; Michael Leask; Matt Machan; Calum MacLeod; Preston Mommsen; Safyaan Sharif; Robert Taylor; Iain Wardlaw	Khurram Khan (c); Amjad Ali; Shaiman Anwar; Nasir Aziz; Salman Faris; Manjula Guruge; Amjad Javed; Rohan Mustafa; Muhammad Naveed; Swapnil Patil; Ahmed Raza; Kamran Shahzad; Vikrant Shetty; Shadeep Silva; Chirag Suri
Kenya	Namibia	Netherlands	Papua New Guinea	Uganda
Rakep Patel (c); Ragheb Aga; Duncan Allan; Irfan Karim; Shem Ngoche; Alex Obanda; Collins Obuya; Nehemiah Odhiambo; Nelson Odhiambo; Thomas Odoyo; Lameck Onyango; Elijah Otieno; Morris Ouma; Steve Tikolo; Hiren Varaiya	Sarel Burger (c); Stephan Baard; Jason Davidson; Gerhard Erasmus; Shalako Groenewald; Louis Klazinga; Jaen Kotze; Xander Pitchers; Bernard Scholtz; Nicolaas Scholtz; JJ Smit; Gerrie Snyman; Christi Viljoen; Louis van der Westhuizen; Craig Williams	Peter Borren (c); Wesley Barresi; Mudassar Bukhari; Daan van Bunge; Atse Buurman; Ben Cooper; Tim Gruijters; Vivian Kingma; Ahsan Malik; Paul van Meekeren; Stephan Myburgh; Michael Rippon; Pieter Seelaar; Michael Swart; Eric Szwarczynski	Chris Amini (c); Charles Amini; Mahuru Dai; Willie Gavera; Raymond Haoda; Geraint Jones; Chris Kent; Vani Vagi Morea; Kila Pala; Pipi Raho; Lega Siaka; Tony Ura; Assad Vala; Norman Vanua; Jack Vare	Davis Arinaitwe (c); Brian Masaba; Deusdedit Muhumuza; Roger Mukasa; Phillimon Selowa; Benjamin Musoke; Abram Mutyagaba; Frank Nsubuga; Patrick Ochan; Faruk Ochimi; Richard Okia; Raymond Otim; Hamza Almuzahim; Lawrence Sematimba; Charles Waiswa

== Warm-up matches ==
10 non ODI warmup games were played before the tournament started.

== Group stage ==
=== Group A ===
==== Points table ====
Pos	Team	Pld	W	L	NR	Pts	NRR	
1	Scotland	4	3	1	0	6	1.663	Advanced to the Super Six stage
2	Hong Kong	4	3	1	0	6	1.069	Advanced to the Super Six stage
3	United Arab Emirates	4	3	1	0	6	0.848	Advanced to the Super Six stage
4	Canada	4	1	3	0	2	−2.066	Qualified for the 7th and 9th place playoffs and automatically relegated
5	Nepal	4	0	4	0	0	−1.567	Qualified for the 7th and 9th place playoffs and automatically relegated

==== Fixtures / Results ====
13 January
10:30
Scorecard

United Arab Emirates; 297/8 (50 overs)	v	Nepal; 195 (48.1 overs)
Shaiman Anwar 109 (96); Basanta Regmi 3/43 (10 overs)		Sharad Vesawkar 54 (87); Kamran Shazad 3/46 (10 overs)

United Arab Emirates won by 102 runs
Rangiora Oval, Rangiora
Umpires: Marais Erasmus (SA) and Mick Martell (Aus)
Player of the match: Shaiman Anwar (UAE)

- Nepal won the toss and elected to field.

13 January
10:30
Scorecard

Hong Kong; 263/7 (50 overs)	v	Scotland; 246 (48.4 overs)
Irfan Ahmed 75 (123); Iain Wardlaw 3/57 (10 overs)		Preston Mommsen 118 (109); Nadeem Ahmed 4/37 (9.4 overs)

Hong Kong won by 17 runs
Queenstown Events Centre, Queenstown
Umpires: Johan Cloete (SA) and Tim Robinson (Eng)
Player of the match: Preston Mommsen (Scot)

- Scotland won the toss and elected to field.

15 January
10:30
Scorecard

United Arab Emirates; 286/6 (50 overs)	v	Canada; 206/6 (50 overs)
Amjad Ali 91 (118); Khurram Chohan 3/65 (10 overs)		Jimmy Hansra 100* (119); Khurram Khan 2/35 (9 overs)

United Arab Emirates won by 80 runs
Rangiora Oval, Rangiora
Umpires: Enamul Haque (Ban) and Peter Nero (WI)
Player of the match: Khurram Khan (UAE)

- United Arab Emirates won the toss and elected to bat.

16 January
10:30
Scorecard

Scotland; 249/7 (50 overs)	v	Nepal; 159 (46.1 overs)
Freddie Coleman 64* (67); Sompal Kami 3/35 (8 overs)		Gyanendra Malla 34 (61); Iain Wardlaw 3/32 (8.1 overs)

Scotland won by 90 runs
Queenstown Events Centre, Queenstown
Umpires: Johan Cloete (SA) and Vineet Kulkarni (India)
Player of the match: Freddie Coleman (Scot)

- Nepal won the toss and elected to field.

17 January
10:30
Scorecard

Canada; 171 (48 overs)	v	Hong Kong; 173/1 (25.2 overs)
Trevin Bastiampillai 29 (51); Haseeb Amjad 3/42 (9 overs)		Irfan Ahmed 100* (85); Jeremy Gordon 1/26 (7 overs)

Hong Kong won by 9 wickets
Queenstown Events Centre, Queenstown
Umpires: Enamul Haque (Ban) and Marais Erasmus (SA)
Player of the match: Irfan Ahmed (HK)

- Canada won the toss and elected to bat.

19 January
10:30
Scorecard

Nepal; 150 (49.3 overs)	v	Hong Kong; 154/0 (33.2 overs)
Basanta Regmi 45 (79); Haseeb Amjad 4/40 (9.3 overs)		Irfan Ahmed 86* (97)

Hong Kong won by 10 wickets
Rangiora Oval, Rangiora
Umpires: Mick Martell (Aus) and Peter Nero (WI)
Player of the match: Irfan Ahmed (HK)

- Hong Kong won the toss and elected to field.

19 January
10:30
Scorecard

Scotland; 265/6 (28 overs)	v	United Arab Emirates; 212 (26.5 overs)
Calum MacLeod 113 (62); Mohammad Naveed 3/44 (6 overs)		Khurram Khan 87 (54); Iain Wardlaw 3/35 (6 overs)

Scotland won by 53 runs
Queenstown Events Centre, Queenstown
Umpires: Vineet Kulkarni (India) and Tim Robinson (Eng)
Player of the match: Calum MacLeod (Scot)

- Scotland won the toss and elected to bat.
- Match reduced to 28 overs per side.

21 January
10:30
Scorecard

Canada; 255/9 (41 overs)	v	Nepal; 243/8 (41 overs)
Raza-ur-Rehman 89 (87); Sompal Kami 3/64 (8 overs)		Gyanendra Malla 86 (97); Khurram Chohan 4/59 (9 overs)

Canada won by 12 runs
Hagley Oval, Christchurch
Umpires: Enamul Haque (Ban) and Mick Martell (Aus)
Player of the match: Raza-ur-Rehman (Can)

- Canada won the toss and elected to bat.

23 January
10:30
Scorecard

Scotland; 341/9 (50 overs)	v	Canada; 171 (39.2 overs)
Calum MacLeod 175 (141); Khurram Chohan 5/68 (10 overs)		Hamza Tariq 71 (70); Safyaan Sharif 2/23 (8.2 overs)

Scotland won by 170 runs
Hagley Oval, Christchurch
Umpires: Marais Erasmus (SA) and Peter Nero (WI)
Player of the match: Calum MacLeod (Scot)

- Canada won the toss and elected to field.

23 January
10:30
Scorecard

United Arab Emirates; 249 (48.1 overs)	v	Hong Kong; 227 (49.4 overs)
Khurram Khan 78 (68); Haseeb Amjad 3/33 (9.1 overs)		Mark Chapman 59 (68); Manjula Guruge 4/39 (10 overs)

United Arab Emirates won by 22 runs
Queenstown Events Centre, Queenstown
Umpires: Johan Cloete (SA) and Tim Robinson (Eng)
Player of the match: Khurram Khan (UAE)

- United Arab Emirates won the toss and elected to bat.

=== Group B ===
==== Points table ====
Pos	Team	Pld	W	L	NR	Pts	NRR	
1	Papua New Guinea	4	3	1	0	6	1.095	Advanced to the Super Six stage
2	Namibia	4	3	1	0	6	0.574	Advanced to the Super Six stage
3	Kenya	4	2	2	0	4	0.401	Advanced to the Super Six stage
4	Netherlands	4	2	2	0	4	0.370	Qualified for the 7th and 9th place playoffs and automatically relegated
5	Uganda	4	0	4	0	0	−2.259	Qualified for the 7th and 9th place playoffs and automatically relegated

==== Fixtures / Results ====
13 January
10:30
Scorecard

Uganda; 152 (46.1 overs)	v	Netherlands; 155/3 (30.1 overs)
Roger Mukasa 44 (56); Michael Rippon 4/15 (10 overs)		Wesley Barresi 61* (70); Davis Arinaitwe 1/26 (6 overs)

Netherlands won by 7 wickets
Bay Oval, Mount Maunganui
Umpires: Ahsan Raza (Pak) and Michael Gough (Eng)
Player of the match: Michael Rippon (Neth)

- Uganda won the toss and elected to bat.

13 January
10:30
Scorecard

Kenya; 249/9 (50 overs)	v	Papua New Guinea; 250/2 (42.5 overs)
Collins Obuya 106 (120); Raymond Haoda 4/50 (9 overs)		Assad Vala 105* (109); Nehemiah Odhiambo 1/43 (10 overs)

Papua New Guinea won by 8 wickets
Pukekura Park, New Plymouth
Umpires: Shaun George (SA) and Ruchira Palliyaguru (SL)
Player of the match: Assad Vala (PNG)

- Papua New Guinea won the toss and elected to field.

15 January
10:30
Scorecard

Namibia; 253/6 (50 overs)	v	Netherlands; 162 (36.5 overs)
Gerrie Snyman 74 (74); Mudassar Bukhari 3/40 (10 overs)		Michael Rippon 44* (73); Christi Viljoen 4/33 (6.5 overs)

Namibia won by 91 runs
Bay Oval 2, Mount Maunganui
Umpires: Michael Gough (Eng) and Joel Wilson (WI)
Player of the match: Gerrie Snyman (Nam)

- Netherlands won the toss and elected to field.

16 January
10:30
Scorecard

Uganda; 105 (35.5 overs)	v	Papua New Guinea; 107/1 (17 overs)
Roger Mukasa 33 (39); Charles Amini 6/19 (10 overs)		Lega Siaka 65* (55); Patrick Ochan 1/26 (4 overs)

Papua New Guinea won by 9 wickets
Pukekura Park, New Plymouth
Umpires: Billy Bowden (NZ) and Shaun George (SA)
Player of the match: Charles Amini (PNG)

- Papua New Guinea won the toss and elected to field.

17 January
10:30
Scorecard

Kenya; 186/8 (50 overs)	v	Namibia; 187/8 (48.5 overs)
Steve Tikolo 47 (82); JJ Smit 3/23 (10 overs)		Sarel Burger 45 (97); Lameck Onyango 2/29 (9 overs)

Namibia won by 2 wickets
Bay Oval, Mount Maunganui
Umpires: Ahsan Raza (Pak) and Joel Wilson (WI)
Player of the match: JJ Smit (Nam)

- Kenya won the toss and elected to bat.

19 January
10:30
Scorecard

Kenya; 253/5 (50 overs)	v	Uganda; 206/8 (50 overs)
Alex Obanda 80 (103); Patrick Ochan 2/56 (10 overs)		Abram Mutyagaba 61 (93); Nelson Odhiambo 2/46 (8 overs)

Kenya won by 47 runs
Bay Oval 2, Mount Maunganui
Umpires: Ahsan Raza (Pak) and Michael Gough (Eng)
Player of the match: Steve Tikolo (Kenya)

- Kenya won the toss and elected to bat.

19 January
10:30
Scorecard

Netherlands; 323/4 (50 overs)	v	Papua New Guinea; 193 (37.2 overs)
Eric Szwarczynski 129* (155); Willie Gavera 2/49 (8 overs)		Jack Vare 96 (59); Mudassar Bukhari 3/15 (9 overs)

Netherlands won by 130 runs
Pukekura Park, New Plymouth
Umpires: Billy Bowden (NZ) and Ruchira Palliyaguruge (SL)
Player of the match: Eric Szwarczynski (Neth)

- Netherlands won the toss and elected to bat.

21 January
10:30
Scorecard

Namibia; 161/9 (36 overs)	v	Uganda; 61 (17.5 overs)
Louis van der Westhuizen 52 (71); Charles Waiswa 4/30 (8 overs)		Phillimon Selowa 23* (41); Louis Klazinga 4/27 (5.5 overs)

Namibia won by 100 runs
Bay Oval, Mount Maunganui
Umpires: Michael Gough (Eng) and Joel Wilson (WI)
Player of the match: Louis van der Westhuizen (Nam)

- Uganda won the toss and elected to field.

23 January
10:30
Scorecard

Namibia; 163 (48.4 overs)	v	Papua New Guinea; 164/2 (25 overs)
Gerrie Snyman 54 (94); Mahuru Dai 3/34 (10 overs)		Lega Siaka 112* (82); Christi Viljoen 1/24 (5 overs)

Papua New Guinea won by 8 wickets
Bay Oval 2, Mount Maunganui
Umpires: Shaun George (SA) and Ruchira Palliyaguruge (SL)
Player of the match: Lega Siaka (PNG)

- Namibia won the toss and elected to bat.

23 January
10:30
Scorecard

Netherlands; 265/6 (50 overs)	v	Kenya; 266/6 (35.4 overs)
Wesley Barresi 137* (150); Lameck Onyango 2/50 (10 overs)		Irfan Karim 108 (84); Ahsan Malik 3/54 (8.4 overs)

Kenya won by 4 wickets
Bert Sutcliffe Oval, Lincoln
Umpires: Vineet Kulkarni (India) and Mick Martell (Aus)
Player of the match: Irfan Karim (Ken)

- Kenya won the toss and elected to field.

== Playoffs ==
Playoff 1
26 January
10:30
Scorecard

Nepal; 171/9 (50 overs)	v	Netherlands; 172/3 (31.5 overs)
Sharad Vesawkar 42 (90); Ahsan Malik 3/21 (4 overs)		Eric Szwarczynski 56 (73); Basanta Regmi 2/50 (10 overs)

Netherlands won by 7 wickets
Bay Oval, Mount Maunganui
Umpires: Shaun George (SA) and Tim Robinson (Eng)
Player of the match: Eric Szwarczynski (Neth)

- Netherlands won the toss and elected to field.

Playoff 2
26 January
10:30
Scorecard

Uganda; 149 (49.5 overs)	v	Canada; 119/1 (29 overs)
Hamza Almuzahim 33 (63); Parth Desai 4/29 (10 overs)		Ruvindu Gunasekera 52* (79); Charles Waiswa 1/21 (4 overs)

Canada won by 59 runs (D/L)
Bay Oval 2, Mount Maunganui
Umpires: Ahsan Raza (Pak) and Ruchira Palliyaguruge (SL)
Player of the match: Parth Desai (Can)

- Canada won the toss and elected to field.
- Rain stopped play after 29 overs in Canada's innings. Their par score was 60 runs.

9th place playoff
28 January
10:30
Scorecard

Nepal; 240 (49.4 overs)	v	Uganda; 80 (36.3 overs)
Prithu Baskota 59* (51); Charles Waiswa 3/55 (10 overs)		Richard Okia 19 (36); Sagar Pun 3/18 (8.3 overs)

Nepal won by 160 runs
Bay Oval 2, Mount Maunganui
Umpires: Ahsan Raza (Pak) and Shaun George (SA)
Player of the match: Prithu Baskota (Nep)

- Nepal won the toss and elected to bat.

7th place playoff
28 January
10:30
Scorecard

Canada; 210 (50 overs)	v	Netherlands; 212/2 (36.4 overs)
Raza-ur-Rehman 88 (105); Michael Rippon 4/37 (10 overs)		Eric Szwarczynski 75* (116); Parth Desai 1/34 (10 overs)

Netherlands won by 8 wickets
Bay Oval, Mount Maunganui
Umpires: Ruchira Palliyaguruge (SL) and Tim Robinson (Eng)
Player of the match: Michael Rippon (Neth)

- Canada won the toss and elected to bat.

== Super Six ==
=== Points table ===
Results of matches between qualified teams were carried over from the group stage.

Pos	Team	Pld	W	L	NR	Pts	NRR	
1	United Arab Emirates	5	4	1	0	8	0.737	Qualified for the Final, 2015 World Cup and gained ODI status until 2018
2	Scotland	5	4	1	0	8	0.495	Qualified for the Final, 2015 World Cup and gained ODI status until 2018
3	Hong Kong	5	3	2	0	6	0.568	Gained ODI status until 2018
4	Papua New Guinea	5	2	3	0	4	−0.495	Gained ODI status until 2018
5	Kenya	5	1	4	0	2	−0.201	Does not have ODI status until 2018
6	Namibia	5	1	4	0	2	−1.035	Does not have ODI status until 2018

=== Fixtures / Results ===
26 January
10:30
Scorecard

Hong Kong; 254/8 (50 overs)	v	Kenya; 223/4 (45.2 overs)
Jamie Atkinson 85 (103); Lameck Onyango 4/29 (10 overs)		Irfan Karim 82 (98); Irfan Ahmed 2/50 (8 overs)

Kenya won by 10 runs (D/L)
Rangiora Oval, Rangiora
Umpires: Johan Cloete (SA) and Vineet Kulkarni (India)
Player of the match: Lameck Onyango (Kenya)

- Kenya won the toss and elected to field.
- Rain stopped play after 45.2 overs in Kenya's innings. Their par score was 213 runs.

26 January
10:30
Scorecard

United Arab Emirates; 280 (48.3 overs)	v	Papua New Guinea; 130 (28.3 overs)
Khurram Khan 138 (145); Willie Gavera 3/39 (9.3 overs)		Charles Amini 49 (44); Amjad Javed 4/26 (9.3 overs)

United Arab Emirates won by 150 runs
Hagley Oval, Christchurch
Umpires: Chris Gaffaney (NZ) and Michael Gough (Eng)
Player of the match: Khurram Khan (UAE)

- Papua New Guinea won the toss and elected to field.

26–27 January
10:30
Scorecard

Scotland; 279/9 (50 overs)	v	Namibia; 258/9 (50 overs)
Matt Machan 78 (61); Bernard Scholtz 3/55 (10 overs)		Craig Williams 57 (91); Safyaan Sharif 4/55 (10 overs)

Scotland won by 21 runs
Bert Sutcliffe Oval, Lincoln
Umpires: Marais Erasmus (SA) and Joel Wilson (WI)
Player of the match: Matt Machan (Scot)

- Scotland won the toss and elected to bat.
- Rain stopped play at 12.1 overs in Namibia's innings and the reserve day was used to complete the match.

28 January
10:30
Scorecard

Hong Kong; 283/9 (50 overs)	v	Namibia; 207 (43.3 overs)
Nizakat Khan 85 (114); Louis Klazinga 4/65 (10 overs)		Craig Williams 59 (91); Haseeb Amjad 4/33 (8 overs)

Hong Kong won by 79 runs
Rangiora Oval, Rangiora
Umpires: Michael Gough (Eng) and Peter Nero (WI)
Player of the match: Nizakat Khan (HK)

- Hong Kong won the toss and elected to bat.

28 January
10:30
Scorecard

United Arab Emirates; 246/8 (50 overs)	v	Kenya; 233 (49.3 overs)
Khurram Khan 85 (125); Nehemiah Odhiambo 4/54 (10 overs)		Maurice Ouma 42 (51); Mohammad Naveed 3/40 (10 overs)

United Arab Emirates won by 13 runs
Hagley Oval, Christchurch
Umpires: Joel Wilson (WI) and Enamul Haque (Ban)
Player of the match: Amjad Javed (UAE)

- Kenya won the toss and elected to field.

28 January
10:30
Scorecard

Scotland; 288/9 (50 overs)	v	Papua New Guinea; 236 (45.1 overs)
Preston Mommsen 94 (105); Raymond Haoda 2/48 (7 overs)		Vani Morea 57 (76); Rob Taylor 3/45 (9.1 overs)

Scotland won by 52 runs
Bert Sutcliffe Oval, Lincoln
Umpires: Marais Erasmus (SA) and Mick Martell (Aus)
Player of the match: Preston Mommsen (Sco)

- Scotland won the toss and elected to bat.

30 January
10:30
Scorecard

United Arab Emirates; 263 (49.5 overs)	v	Namibia; 227/9 (50 overs)
Khurram Khan 49 (82); Louis Klazinga 5/36 (8.5 overs)		Sarel Burger 54 (102); Amjad Javed 3/35 (10 overs)

United Arab Emirates won by 36 runs
Rangiora Oval, Rangiora
Umpires: Johannes Cloete (SA) and Enamul Haque (Ban)
Player of the match: Khurram Khan (UAE)

- United Arab Emirates won the toss and elected to bat.

30 January
10:30
Scorecard

Kenya; 260 (50 overs)	v	Scotland; 261/7 (49.3 overs)
Alex Obanda 89 (101); Safyaan Sharif 2/65 (10 overs)		Preston Mommsen 78 (97); Thomas Odoyo 3/53 (9.3 overs)

Scotland won by 3 wickets
Hagley Oval, Christchurch
Umpires: Peter Nero (WI) and Vineet Kulkarni (Ind)
Player of the match: Preston Mommsen (Sco)

- Kenya won the toss and elected to bat.

30 January
10:30
Scorecard

Papua New Guinea; 255/8 (50 overs)	v	Hong Kong; 259/7 (36.1 overs)
Geraint Jones 82 (91); Haseeb Amjad 3/70 (10 overs)		Irfan Ahmed 90 (82); Willie Gavera 3/53 (8 overs)

Hong Kong won by 3 wickets
Bert Sutcliffe Oval, Lincoln
Umpires: Chris Gaffaney (NZ) and Mick Martell (Aus)
Player of the match: Irfan Ahmed (HK)

- Papua New Guinea won the toss and elected to bat.

== Final ==
Final
1 February
10:30
Scorecard

Scotland; 285/5 (50 overs)	v	United Arab Emirates; 244/9 (50 overs)
Preston Mommsen 139* (149); Manjula Guruge 3/67 (10 overs)		Swapnil Patil 99* (99); Safyaan Sharif 3/41 (10 overs)

Scotland won by 41 runs
Bert Sutcliffe Oval, Lincoln
Umpires: Michael Gough (Eng) and Joel Wilson (WI)
Player of the match: Preston Mommsen (Sco)

- Scotland won the toss and elected to bat.

== Final standings ==
Position	Team	Status
1st	Scotland	Qualified for the 2015 World Cup and gained ODI status until 2018.
2nd	United Arab Emirates	Qualified for the 2015 World Cup and gained ODI status until 2018.
3rd	Hong Kong	Gained ODI status until 2018.
4th	Papua New Guinea	Gained ODI status until 2018.
5th	Kenya	Does not have ODI status until 2018 and remain in Division Two.
6th	Namibia	Does not have ODI status until 2018 and remain in Division Two.
7th	Netherlands	Does not have ODI status until 2018 and remain in Division Two.
8th	Canada	Does not have ODI status until 2018 and remain in Division Two.
9th	Nepal	Does not have ODI status until 2018 and relegated to Division Three.
10th	Uganda	Does not have ODI status until 2018 and relegated to Division Three.

== Statistics ==
=== Most runs ===
Player	Team	Matches	Innings	Runs	Average	HS	100s	50s
Khurram Khan	United Arab Emirates	8	8	581	72.62	138	1	4
Preston Mommsen	Scotland	8	8	520	86.66	139*	2	2
Calum MacLeod	Scotland	8	8	401	57.12	175	2	–
Swapnil Patil	United Arab Emirates	8	8	364	52.00	99*	–	2
Irfan Ahmed	Hong Kong	7	7	363	72.60	100*	1	3
Wesley Barresi	Netherlands	6	6	318	79.50	137*	1	2
Eric Szwarczynski	Netherlands	4	4	317	158.50	129*	1	3

=== Most wickets ===
Player	Team	Matches	Overs	Wickets	Average	BB	4W	Econ
Haseeb Amjad	Hong Kong	7	63	20	15.40	4/33	2	4.88
Louis Klazinga	Namibia	7	50.4	18	14.88	5/36	3	5.28
Manjula Guruge	United Arab Emirates	8	65	16	18.31	4/39	1	4.50
Iain Wardlaw	Scotland	8	70.1	16	23.37	3/32	–	5.33
Christi Viljoen	Namibia	7	53.5	14	19.00	4/33	1	4.94
Khurram Chohan	Canada	6	47.5	14	20.64	5/68	2	6.04
Safyaan Sharif	Scotland	8	72.2	14	23.92	4/55	1	4.63

== See also ==
- ICC World Cricket League
- 2015 World Cup
