= 2011–2013 ICC World Cricket League Championship =

2011–13 ICC World Cricket League Championship
- Administrator: International Cricket Council
- Cricket format: List A and One Day International
- Tournament format: Round-robin
- Champions: Ireland
- Participants: 8
- Matches: 56

The 2011–13 ICC World Cricket League Championship (originally named the Intercontinental Cup One-Day) was the first edition of the ICC World Cricket League Championship, though the competition had been previously run under the name ICC World Cricket League Division One. It ran from June 2011 until October 2013, in parallel with the first-class 2011–13 ICC Intercontinental Cup, and was contested by the same eight associate and affiliate member teams.

== Format ==
The eight qualifiers were the six teams from 2010 ICC World Cricket League Division One:

- Afghanistan
- Canada
- Ireland
- Kenya
- Netherlands
- Scotland

and the top two teams from 2011 ICC World Cricket League Division Two:

- Namibia
- United Arab Emirates

The tournament comprised a round robin format. Matches between teams from Division One had full One-Day International status, while matches featuring one or both of the Division Two teams had List A status.

The top two teams qualified for the 2015 Cricket World Cup, with the remaining six teams entering a further World Cup qualifying tournament to decide the final two World Cup places.

== Fixtures ==
The breakdown of fixtures was as follows: During each round, each team played against their opponent twice.

Round	Window	Home team	Away team	Match status	Result
1	June – July 2011	Ireland	Namibia	List A	2–0
1	June – July 2011	Scotland	Netherlands	ODI	2–0
1	June – July 2011	Kenya	United Arab Emirates	List A	1–1
1	June – July 2011	Canada	Afghanistan	ODI	0–2
2	September – October 2011	Ireland	Canada	ODI	2–0
2	September – October 2011	Namibia	Scotland	List A	0–2
2	September – October 2011	Netherlands	Kenya	ODI	2–0
2	September – October 2011	Afghanistan	United Arab Emirates	List A	0–2
3	March – April 2012	Afghanistan	Netherlands	ODI	1–1
3	March – April 2012	United Arab Emirates	Scotland	List A	2–0
3	March – April 2012	Kenya	Ireland	ODI	1–1
3	March – April 2012	Namibia	Canada	List A	1–1
4	June – July 2012	Ireland	Afghanistan	ODI	1–0
4	June – July 2012	Kenya	Namibia	List A	1–1
4	June – July 2012	Scotland	Canada	ODI	1–0
4	June – July 2012	Netherlands	United Arab Emirates	List A	2–0
5	March – April 2013	Kenya	Canada	ODI	2–0
5	March – April 2013	Namibia	Netherlands	List A	0–2
5	March – April 2013	United Arab Emirates	Ireland	List A	0–2
5	March – April 2013	Afghanistan	Scotland	ODI	2–0
6	July – August 2013	Canada	United Arab Emirates	List A	0–2
6	July – August 2013	Scotland	Kenya	ODI	2–0
6	July – August 2013	Netherlands	Ireland	ODI	0–1
6	July – August 2013	Namibia	Afghanistan	List A	0–2
7	September – October 2013	Ireland	Scotland	ODI	2–0
7	September – October 2013	Afghanistan	Kenya	ODI	2–0
7	September – October 2013	Canada	Netherlands	ODI	0–1
7	September – October 2013	United Arab Emirates	Namibia	List A	2–0

== Points table ==
Pos	Team	Pld	W	L	T	NR	Pts	NRR	Progress to
1	Ireland	14	11	1	1	1	24	0.985	2015 Cricket World Cup
2	Afghanistan	14	9	4	0	1	19	0.765	2015 Cricket World Cup
3	United Arab Emirates	14	9	5	0	0	18	0.359	2014 Cricket World Cup Qualifier
4	Netherlands	14	8	4	1	1	18	0.621	2014 Cricket World Cup Qualifier
5	Scotland	14	7	6	0	1	15	−0.117	2014 Cricket World Cup Qualifier
6	Kenya	14	5	9	0	0	10	−0.461	2014 Cricket World Cup Qualifier
7	Namibia	14	2	12	0	0	4	−1.162	2014 Cricket World Cup Qualifier
8	Canada	14	1	11	0	2	4	−0.963	2014 Cricket World Cup Qualifier

Source: ESPNcricinfo

== Matches ==
=== Round 1 ===
28 June 2011
Scorecard

Scotland; 255/7 (50 overs)	v	Netherlands; 240 (49 overs)
Kyle Coetzer 64 (92); Peter Borren 3/52 (10 overs)		Tom Cooper 75 (103); Majid Haq 4/33 (10 overs)

Scotland won by 15 runs
Mannofield Park, Aberdeen, Scotland
Umpires: Niels Bagh (Den) and Peter Nero (WI)

- Scotland won the toss and elected to bat.
- Points: Scotland 2, Netherlands 0.

29 June 2011
Scorecard

Netherlands; 180/9 (50 overs)	v	Scotland; 162/5 (39.1 overs)
Peter Borren 71* (107); Safyaan Sharif 4/27 (8 overs)		Kyle Coetzer 89* (99); Mudassar Bukhari 3/21 (9 overs)

Scotland won by 5 wickets (D/L)
Mannofield Park, Aberdeen, Scotland
Umpires: Niels Bagh (Den) and Peter Nero (WI)

- Scotland won the toss and elected to field.
- Rain stopped play after 17 overs in Scotland's innings, revising the target to 162 runs from 41 overs via the Duckworth–Lewis method.
- Points: Scotland 2, Netherlands 0.

4 July 2011
Scorecard

Ireland; 241 (49.5 overs)	v	Namibia; 215 (48.4 overs)
John Mooney 86 (73); Christi Viljoen 3/38 (10 overs)		Gerrie Snyman 60 (100); Alex Cusack 3/29 (7.4 overs)

Ireland won by 26 runs
Civil Service Cricket Club, Stormont, Belfast, Northern Ireland
Umpires: Johan Cloete (SA) and Richard Smith (Ire)

- Ireland won the toss and elected to bat.
- Points: Ireland 2, Namibia 0.

5 July 2011
Scorecard

Namibia; 175 (36 overs)	v	Ireland; 176/2 (30.2 overs)
Nicholaas Scholtz 35* (29); John Mooney 3/31 (7 overs)		Alex Cusack 59* (55); Christi Viljoen 1/29 (8 overs)

Ireland won by 8 wickets
Civil Service Cricket Club, Stormont, Belfast, Northern Ireland
Umpires: Johan Cloete (SA) and Richard Smith (Ire)

- Namibia won the toss and elected to bat.
- Points: Ireland 2, Namibia 0.

25 July 2011
Scorecard

Kenya; 210 (49.3 overs)	v	United Arab Emirates; 119/8 (35 overs)
Tanmay Mishra 66 (92); Shoaib Sarwar 5/23 (10 overs)		Amjad Ali 30 (31); Rajesh Bhudia 5/21 (7 overs)

Kenya won by 66 runs (D/L)
Gymkhana Club Ground, Nairobi, Kenya
Umpires: Shaun George (SA) and Russell Tiffin (Zim)

- Kenya won the toss and elected to bat.
- Rain stopped play after 35 overs in the United Arab Emirates' innings, revising the target to 186 runs from 35 overs via the Duckworth–Lewis method.
- Points: Kenya 2, United Arab Emirates 0.

26 July 2011
Scorecard

Kenya; 230/9 (50 overs)	v	United Arab Emirates; 233/6 (46.4 overs)
Rakep Patel 124 (154); Saqib Ali 3/28 (8 overs)		Khurram Khan 65* (60); Lucas Oluoch 2/46 (7.4 overs)

United Arab Emirates won by 4 wickets
Gymkhana Club Ground, Nairobi, Kenya
Umpires: Shaun George (SA) and Russell Tiffin (Zim)

- United Arab Emirates won the toss and elected to field.
- Points: Kenya 0, United Arab Emirates 2.

7 August 2011
Scorecard

Canada; 230 (44.5 overs)	v	Afghanistan; 213/8 (41.1 overs)
Hiral Patel 62 (85); Mohammad Nabi 4/31 (9.5 overs)		Shabir Noori 94 (109); Hiral Patel 4/28 (6.1 overs)

Afghanistan won by 2 wickets (D/L)
Maple Leaf Cricket Club, King City, Ontario, Canada
Umpires: Gregory Brathwaite (WI) and Chris Gaffaney (NZ)

- Afghanistan won the toss and elected to field
- Rain stopped play after 22 overs in Afghanistan's innings, revising the target to 213 runs from 43 overs via the Duckworth–Lewis method.
- Points: Canada 0, Afghanistan 2.

9 August 2011
Scorecard

Afghanistan; 150 (18.3 overs)	v	Canada; 133/9 (20 overs)
Mohammad Nabi 47 (31); Harvir Baidwan 3/19 (3.3 overs)		Hiral Patel 45 (39); Samiullah Shenwari 3/16 (3 overs)

Afghanistan won by 17 runs
Toronto Cricket, Skating and Curling Club, Toronto, Ontario, Canada
Umpires: Gregory Brathwaite (WI) and Chris Gaffaney (NZ)
Player of the match: Mohammad Nabi (AFG)

- Afghanistan won the toss and elected to bat first.
- Rain reduced match to 20 overs per side.
- Points: Canada 0, Afghanistan 2.

=== Round 2 ===
12 September 2011
Scorecard

Kenya; 208/8 (50 overs)	v	Netherlands; 198/8 (42 overs)
Seren Waters 71 (100); Ahsan Malik 3/38 (10 overs)		Peter Borren 40 (42); Lameck Onyango 3/30 (8 overs)

Netherlands won by 2 wickets (D/L)
Sportpark Westvliet, Voorburg, Netherlands
Umpires: Johan Cloete (SA) and Ian Ramage (Sco)

- Kenya won the toss and elected to bat
- Rain stopped play after Kenya's innings, revising the target to 196 runs from 43 overs via the Duckworth–Lewis method.
- Points: Netherlands 2, Kenya 0.

13 September 2011
Scorecard

Kenya; 184/8 (50 overs)	v	Netherlands; 187/6 (45 overs)
Collins Obuya 54 (99); Mudassar Bukhari 3/50 (10 overs)		Wesley Barresi 67 (86); Dominic Wesonga 2/28 (7 overs)

Netherlands won by 4 wickets
Sportpark Westvliet, Voorburg, Netherlands
Umpires: Johan Cloete (SA) and Ian Ramage (Sco)

- Kenya won the toss and elected to bat
- Points: Netherlands 2, Kenya 0

19 September 2011
Scorecard

Ireland; 328/6 (50 overs)	v	Canada; 195 (48.4 overs)
Ed Joyce 88 (98); Khurram Chohan 3/65 (10 overs)		Usman Limbada 50 (81); John Mooney 4/27 (8.4 overs)

Ireland won by 133 runs
Clontarf Cricket Club Ground, Dublin, Ireland
Umpires: Niels Bagh(Den) and Mark Hawthorne(Ire)

- Canada won the toss and elected to field.
- Points: Ireland 2, Canada 0

20 September 2011
Scorecard

Ireland; 249/7 (50 overs)	v	Canada; 193 (46.3 overs)
William Porterfield 53 (65); Harvir Baidwan 2/62 (10 overs)		Jimmy Hansra 38 (62); Alex Cusack 2/11 (1.1 overs)

Ireland won by 56 runs
Clontarf Cricket Club Ground, Dublin, Ireland
Umpires: Niels Bagh(Den) and Mark Hawthorne(Ire)

- Ireland won the toss and elected to bat
- Points: Ireland 2, Canada 0

28 September 2011
Scorecard

Namibia; 257 (50 overs)	v	Scotland; 137/2 (26 overs)
Christi Viljoen 78 (92); Majid Haq 3/66 (10 overs)		Calum MacLeod 46 (48); Christi Viljoen 1/11 (3 overs)

Scotland won by 34 runs (D/L)
Wanderers Cricket Ground, Windhoek, Namibia
Umpires: Jeff Luck (Nam) and Ranmore Martinesz (Sri)

- Namibia won the toss and elected to bat
- Rain stopped play after 26 overs in the Scotland's innings, revising the target to 104 runs from 26 overs via the Duckworth–Lewis method.
- Points: Namibia 0, Scotland 2.

29 September 2011
Scorecard

Namibia; 266/8 (50 overs)	v	Scotland; 247/7 (44.5 overs)
Craig Williams 116 (117); Gordon Goudie 4/55 (10 overs)		Kyle Coetzer 98 (107); Gerrie Snyman 2/39 (5.5 overs)

Scotland won by 3 wickets (D/L)
Wanderers Cricket Ground, Windhoek, Namibia
Umpires: Wynand Louw (Nam) and Ranmore Martinesz (Sri)

- Namibia won the toss and elected to bat
- Rain stopped play after 24 overs in the Scotland's innings, revising the target to 247 runs from 45 overs via the Duckworth–Lewis method.
- Points: Namibia 0, Scotland 2.

10 October 2011
Scorecard

United Arab Emirates; 198 (44.3 overs)	v	Afghanistan; 183 (48.3 overs)
Khurram Khan 53 (48); Dawlat Zadran 3/24 (7 overs)		Gulbodin Naib 43 (55); Khurram Khan 4/25 (9.3 overs)

United Arab Emirates won by 15 runs
Sharjah Cricket Association Stadium, Sharjah, UAE
Umpires: Ahsan Raza (Pak) and Buddhi Pradhan (Nep)

- United Arab Emirates won the toss and elected to bat
- Points: Afghanistan 0, United Arab Emirates 2.

12 October 2011
Scorecard

United Arab Emirates; 221/8 (50 overs)	v	Afghanistan; 152 (44.4 overs)
Khurram Khan 43 (49); Hamza Hotak 3/43 (8 overs)		Asghar Stanikzai 33 (69); Khurram Khan 3/29 (9 overs)

United Arab Emirates won by 69 runs
Sharjah Cricket Association Stadium, Sharjah, UAE
Umpires: Ahsan Raza (Pak) and Buddhi Pradhan (Nep)

- United Arab Emirates won the toss and elected to bat
- Points: Afghanistan 0, United Arab Emirates 2.

=== Round 3 ===
18 February 2012
Scorecard

Ireland; 200 (47.3 overs)	v	Kenya; 201/3 (42.4 overs)
Paul Stirling 46 (44); Collins Obuya 3/24 (6 overs)		Tanmay Mishra 70* (76); John Mooney 1/27 (7 overs)

Kenya won by 7 wickets
Mombasa Sports Club, Mombasa, Kenya
Umpires: David Odhiambo (Ken) and Russell Tiffin (Zim)
Player of the match: Tanmay Mishra (Ken)

- Ireland won the toss and elected to bat.
- Points: Kenya 2, Ireland 0.

20 February
Scorecard

Ireland; 237/9 (50 overs)	v	Kenya; 120 (35.1 overs)
Ed Joyce 88 (125); Hiren Varaiya 3/46 (10 overs)		Shem Ngoche 28 (37); Alex Cusack 2/13 (5 overs)

Ireland won by 117 runs
Mombasa Sports Club, Mombasa, Kenya
Umpires: Shaun George (SA) and Russell Tiffin (Zim)
Player of the match: Ed Joyce (Ire)

- Ireland won the toss and elected to bat.
- Points: Kenya 0, Ireland 2.

7 March 2012
Scorecard

Scotland; 167 (48.5 overs)	v	United Arab Emirates; 171/6 (47.5 overs)
Craig Wallace 40 (74); Khurram Khan 3/29 (8.5 overs)		Shaiman Anwar 58 (115); Richie Berrington 2/15 (5 overs)

United Arab Emirates won by 4 wickets
Sharjah Cricket Association Stadium, Sharjah, UAE
Umpires: Buddhi Pradhan (Nep) and Joel Wilson (WI)

- United Arab Emirates won the toss and elected to field.
- Points: United Arab Emirates 2, Scotland 0.

9 March 2012
Scorecard

Scotland; 205/9 (50 overs)	v	United Arab Emirates; 209/8 (49.5 overs)
Kyle Coetzer 73 (106); Arshad Ali 3/35 (8 overs)		Shaiman Anwar 77* (107); Preston Mommsen 2/23 (8 overs)

United Arab Emirates won by 2 wickets
Sharjah Cricket Association Stadium, Sharjah, UAE
Umpires: Buddhi Pradhan (Nep) and Joel Wilson (WI)

- Scotland won the toss and elected to bat.
- Points: United Arab Emirates 2, Scotland 0.

29 March 2012
Scorecard

Afghanistan; 153 (39.2 overs)	v	Netherlands; 156/1 (26.2 overs)
Mohammad Nabi 41 (63); Peter Borren 4/32 (10 overs)		Alexei Kervezee 83* (63); Izatullah Dawlatzai 1/19 (5 overs)

Netherlands won by 9 wickets
Sharjah Cricket Association Stadium, Sharjah, UAE
Umpires: Chris Gaffaney (NZ) and Sarika Prasad (Sin)

- Afghanistan won the toss and elected to bat.
- Points: Afghanistan 0, Netherlands 2.

31 March 2012
Scorecard

Netherlands; 256/9 (50 overs)	v	Afghanistan; 259/5 (46.2 overs)
Michael Swart 52 (57); Izatullah Dawlatzai 4/38 (9 overs)		Karim Sadiq 100 (74); Timm van der Gugten 2/35 (7 overs)

Afghanistan won by 5 wickets
Sharjah Cricket Association Stadium, Sharjah, UAE
Umpires: Chris Gaffaney (NZ) and Sarika Prasad (Sin)

- Afghanistan won the toss and elected to field.
- Points: Afghanistan 2, Netherlands 0.

10 April 2012
Scorecard

Namibia; 183 (47.1 overs)	v	Canada; 184/8 (48.5 overs)
Raymond van Schoor 90 (121); Durand Soraine 3/25 (8 overs)		Jimmy Hansra 49 (87); Louis Klazinga 2/26 (8 overs)

Canada won by 2 wickets
Wanderers Cricket Ground, Windhoek, Namibia
Umpires: Owen Chirombe (Zim) and Jeff Luck (Nam)

- Canada won the toss and elected to field.
- Points: Namibia 0, Canada 2.

12 April 2012
Scorecard

Namibia; 154 (45.5 overs)	v	Canada; 133 (46.5 overs)
Christi Viljoen 50* (88); Rizwan Cheema 6/34 (8.5 overs)		Tyson Gordon 38 (96); Sarel Burger 3/18 (8.5 overs)

Namibia won by 21 runs
Wanderers Cricket Ground, Windhoek, Namibia
Umpires: Owen Chirombe (Zim) and Jeff Luck (Nam)

- Namibia won the toss and elected to bat.
- Points: Namibia 2, Canada 0.

=== Round 4 ===
3 July 2012
Scorecard

Ireland	v	Afghanistan

Match abandoned without a ball bowled
Clontarf Cricket Club Ground, Dublin, Ireland
Umpires: Shaun George (SA) and Richard Smith (Ire)

- No play on 3 and 4 July due to rain.
- Points: Ireland 1, Afghanistan 1

5 July 2012
Scorecard

Ireland; 163 (47 overs)	v	Afghanistan; 104 (33.1 overs)
Ed Joyce 67* (124); Shapoor Zadran 3/20 (8 overs)		Najibullah Zadran 23 (32); Alex Cusack 3/17 (8 overs)

Ireland won by 59 runs
Clontarf Cricket Club Ground, Dublin, Ireland
Umpires: Shaun George (SA) and Richard Smith (Ire)

- Afghanistan won the toss and elected to field.
- Points: Ireland 2, Afghanistan 0

9 July 2012
Scorecard

Scotland	v	Canada

Match abandoned without a ball bowled
Cambusdoon New Ground, Ayr, Scotland
Umpires: Mark Hawthorne (Ire) and Ian Ramage (Sco)

- Match shifted from Mannofield Park, Aberdeen due to rain.
- No play on 9 and 10 July due to rain.
- Points: Scotland 1, Canada 1

12 July 2012
Scorecard

Canada; 176 (49.1 overs)	v	Scotland; 177/6 (42.1 overs)
Ruvindu Gunasekera 53 (75); Majid Haq 2/19 (10 overs)		Calum MacLeod 99* (127); Durand Soraine 2/57 (10 overs)

Scotland won by 4 wickets
Cambusdoon New Ground, Ayr, Scotland
Umpires: Mark Hawthorne (Ire) and Ian Ramage (Sco)

- Scotland won the toss and elected to field.
- Match shifted from Mannofield Park, Aberdeen due to rain.
- No play on 11 July due to rain.
- Points: Scotland 2, Canada 0

21 July 2012
Scorecard

United Arab Emirates; 96 (31.2 overs)	v	Netherlands; 97/3 (21.4 overs)
Rohan Mustafa 41 (81); Mudassar Bukhari 4/32 (10 overs)		Tom Cooper 37 (35); Ahmed Raza 2/22 (3.4 overs)

Netherlands won by 7 wickets
Hazelaarweg, Rotterdam, Netherlands
Umpires: Vineet Kulkarni (Ind) and Buddhi Pradhan (Nep)

- Netherlands won the toss and elected to field.
- Points: Netherlands 2, United Arab Emirates 0

23 July 2012
Scorecard

United Arab Emirates; 221/9 (50 overs)	v	Netherlands; 222/7 (48.4 overs)
Khurram Khan 71 (85); Pieter Seelaar 4/32 (10 overs)		Michael Swart 48 (50); Manjula Guruge 2/34 (10 overs)

Netherlands won by 3 wickets
Sportpark Het Schootsveld, Deventer, Netherlands
Umpires: Vineet Kulkarni (Ind) and Buddhi Pradhan (Nep)

- Netherlands won the toss and elected to field.
- Match shifted from Hazelaarweg, Rotterdam due to rain.
- Points: Netherlands 2, United Arab Emirates 0

4 October 2012
Scorecard

Namibia; 129 (43.1 overs)	v	Kenya; 132/4 (30.5 overs)
Raymond van Schoor 22 (40); Nelson Odhiambo 3/31 (10 overs)		Tanmay Mishra 34* (49); Christi Viljoen 1/18 (7.5 overs)

Kenya won by 6 wickets
Wanderers Cricket Ground, Windhoek, Namibia
Umpires: David Odhiambo (Ken) and Russell Tiffin (Zim)

- Kenya won the toss and elected to field
- Match was originally scheduled for 11 June, but was pushed back due to security reasons.
- Match moved from Gymkhana Club Ground, Nairobi, Kenya due to security reasons.
- Points: Kenya 2, Namibia 0

6 October 2012
Scorecard

Kenya; 187 (42.1 overs)	v	Namibia; 188/3 (42.0 overs)
Alex Obanda 71 (67); Christi Viljoen 3/40 (10 overs)		Craig Williams 59* (60); Collins Obuya 1/23 (4 overs)

Namibia won by 7 wickets
Wanderers Cricket Ground, Windhoek, Namibia
Umpires: David Odhiambo (Ken) and Russell Tiffin (Zim)

- Namibia won the toss and elected to field
- Match was originally scheduled for 13 June, but was pushed back due to security reasons.
- Match moved from Gymkhana Club Ground, Nairobi, Kenya due to security reasons.
- Points: Namibia 2, Kenya 0

=== Round 5 ===
6 March 2013
Scorecard

Scotland; 199/8 (50 overs)	v	Afghanistan; 203/3 (33.5 overs)
Richie Berrington 51 (86); Gulbodin Naib 4/30 (9 overs)		Nawroz Mangal 112* (96); Iain Wardlaw 2/52 (10 overs)

Afghanistan won by 7 wickets
Sharjah Cricket Association Stadium, Sharjah, UAE
Umpires: Ruchira Palliyaguru (Sri) and Sarika Prasad (Sin)
Player of the match: Nawroz Mangal (Afg)

- Scotland won the toss and elected to bat
- Points: Afghanistan 2, Scotland 0

8 March 2013
Scorecard

Scotland; 259/9 (50 overs)	v	Afghanistan; 261/5 (48.4 overs)
Kyle Coetzer 133 (136); Samiullah Shenwari 3/42 (9 overs)		Mohammad Nabi 51 (44); Gordon Drummond 1/27 (5 overs)

Afghanistan won by 5 wickets
Sharjah Cricket Association Stadium, Sharjah, UAE
Umpires: Ruchira Palliyaguru (Sri) and Sarika Prasad (Sin)
Player of the match: Samiullah Shenwari (Afg)

- Afghanistan won the toss and elected to field
- Points: Afghanistan 2, Scotland 0

11 March 2013
10:00
Scorecard

Canada; 227/8 (50 overs)	v	Kenya; 228/4 (47.3 overs)
Ruvindu Gunasekera 72 (112); Elijah Otieno 4/33 (10 overs)		Irfan Karim 65 (108); Henry Osinde 2/34 (8 overs)

Kenya won by 6 wickets
ICC Global Cricket Academy, Dubai, UAE
Umpires: Rob Bailey (Eng) and David Odhiambo (Ken)
Player of the match: Elijah Otieno (Ken)

- Canada won the toss and elected to bat.
- Points: Kenya 2, Canada 0

13 March 2013
Scorecard

Canada; 253/9 (50 overs)	v	Kenya; 254/4 (48 overs)
Rizwan Cheema 55 (66); Collins Obuya 2/15 (5 overs)		Irfan Karim 112 (137); Rayyan Pathan 2/50 (6 overs)

Kenya won by 6 wickets
ICC Global Cricket Academy, Dubai, UAE
Umpires: Rob Bailey (Eng) and David Odhiambo (Ken\)
Player of the match: Irfan Karim (Ken)

- Canada won the toss and elected to bat.
- Points: Kenya 2, Canada 0
Canada are eliminated from direct qualification to the 2015 Cricket World Cup.

18 March 2013
Scorecard

United Arab Emirates; 165 (46.4 overs)	v	Ireland; 169/5 (42 overs)
Swapnil Patil 65 (91); Alex Cusack 3/21 (10 overs)		Gary Wilson 72* (102); Nasir Aziz 3/26 (10 overs)

Ireland won by 5 wickets
Sharjah Cricket Association Stadium, Sharjah, UAE
Umpires: Rob Bailey (Eng) and Vineet Kulkarni (Ind)
Player of the match: Gary Wilson (Ire)

- Ireland won the toss and elected to field
- Points: Ireland 2, United Arab Emirates 0

20 March 2013
Scorecard

United Arab Emirates; 196 (49.4 overs)	v	Ireland; 199/4 (47.4 overs)
Shaiman Anwar 39 (62); Trent Johnston 4/25 (9 overs)		William Porterfield 77 (104); Mohammad Azam 1/28 (8.2 overs)

Ireland won by 6 wickets
Sharjah Cricket Association Stadium, Sharjah, UAE
Umpires: Rob Bailey (Eng) and Vineet Kulkarni (Ind)
Player of the match: Trent Johnston (Ire)

- Ireland won the toss and elected to field
- Points: Ireland 2, United Arab Emirates 0

16 April 2013
Scorecard

Netherlands; 269/9 (50 overs)	v	Namibia; 237 (48.5 overs)
Wesley Barresi 60 (59); Louis Klazinga 3/48 (10 overs)		Craig Williams 116 (121); Timm van der Gugten 3/37 (9.5 overs)

Netherlands won by 31 runs
Wanderers Cricket Ground, Windhoek, Namibia
Umpires: Shaun George (SA) and Wynand Louw (Nam)

- Namibia won the toss and elected to field
- Points: Netherlands 2, Namibia 0

18 April 2013
Scorecard

Namibia; 236/5 (50 overs)	v	Netherlands; 240/9 (48 overs)
Raymond van Schoor 93* (130); Peter Borren 2/34 (8 overs)		Daan van Bunge 60 (83); Christi Viljoen 3/43 (10 overs)

Netherlands won by 1 wicket
Wanderers Cricket Ground, Windhoek, Namibia
Umpires: Shaun George (SA) and Wynand Louw (Nam)

- Netherlands won the toss and elected to field
- Points: Netherlands 2, Namibia 0
Namibia are eliminated from direct qualification to the 2015 Cricket World Cup.

=== Round 6 ===
30 June 2013
Scorecard

Scotland; 242/4 (50 overs)	v	Kenya; 230 (49.1 overs)
Matt Machan 114 (111); Nelson Odhiambo 3/48 (10 overs)		Tanmay Mishra 61 (56); Iain Wardlaw 4/45 (10 overs)

Scotland won by 12 runs
Mannofield Park, Aberdeen, Scotland
Umpires: Gregory Brathwaite (WI) and Ian Ramage (SCO)

- Kenya won the toss and elected to field.
- Points: Scotland 2, Kenya 0
- Freddie Coleman (Scotland) made his ODI debut.

2–3 July 2013
Scorecard

Kenya; 183 (46.3 overs)	v	Scotland; 139/6 (33.4/35 overs)
Tanmay Mishra 59 (82); Neil Carter 3/27 (10 overs)		Kyle Coetzer 57 (80); Ragheb Aga 2/32 (5 overs)

Scotland won by 4 wickets (D/L)
Mannofield Park, Aberdeen, Scotland
Umpires: Gregory Brathwaite (WI) and Ian Ramage (SCO)

- Scotland won the toss and elected to field.
- Rain halted Scotland's innings on the first day after 6.3 overs and reduced Scotland's innings to 35 overs on the second day.
- Points: Scotland 2, Kenya 0
Kenya are eliminated from direct qualification to the 2015 Cricket World Cup.

7 July 2013
Scorecard

Ireland; 236 (49.5 overs)	v	Netherlands; 148 (36 overs)
William Porterfield 79 (118); Mudassar Bukhari 3/41 (10 overs)		Wesley Barresi 55 (67); Kevin O'Brien 4/13 (7 overs)

Ireland won by 88 runs
VRA Cricket Ground, Amstelveen, Netherlands
Umpires: Chris Gaffaney (NZ) and Mark Hawthorne (IRE)

- Ireland won the toss and elected to bat.
- Points: Ireland 2, Netherlands 0
- Michael Rippon (Netherland) made his ODI debut for the Netherlands.

9 July 2013
Scorecard

Ireland; 268/5 (50 overs)	v	Netherlands; 268/9 (50 overs)
Ed Joyce 96* (113); Mudassar Bukhari 2/63 (10 overs)		Wesley Barresi 46 (67); Kevin O'Brien 3/52 (10 overs)

Match tied
VRA Cricket Ground, Amstelveen, Netherlands
Umpires: Chris Gaffaney (NZ) and Mark Hawthorne (IRE)

- Ireland won the toss and elected to bat.
- Points: Ireland 1, Netherlands 1
Ireland have qualified for the 2015 Cricket World Cup

6 August 2013
Scorecard

United Arab Emirates; 269/4 (50 overs)	v	Canada; 223 (46.5 overs)
Shaiman Anwar 102* (109); Harvir Baidwan 2/51 (10 overs)		Usman Limbada 58 (86); Nasir Aziz 4/33 (10 overs)

United Arab Emirates won by 46 runs
Maple Leaf Cricket Club, King City, Ontario, Canada
Umpires: Sameer Bandekar (USA) and Simon Fry (Aus)

- Canada won the toss and elected to field.
- Points: United Arab Emirates 2, Canada 0
- Cecil Pervez (Canada) made his List A debut.

8 August 2013
Scorecard

Canada; 179/9 (50 overs)	v	United Arab Emirates; 183/8 (48.5 overs)
Hiral Patel 53 (50); Nasir Aziz 4/20 (10 overs)		Shaiman Anwar 57 (93); Rizwan Cheema 4/16 (7.5 overs)

United Arab Emirates won by 2 wickets
Maple Leaf Cricket Club, King City, Ontario, Canada
Umpires: Sameer Bandekar (USA) and Simon Fry (Aus)
Player of the match: Nasir Aziz (UAE)

- United Arab Emirates won the toss and elected to field.
- Points: United Arab Emirates 2, Canada 0

9 August 2013
Scorecard

Afghanistan; 289/4 (50 overs)	v	Namibia; 99 all out (32.1 overs)
Mohammad Shahzad 113 (130); Jason Davidson 1/48 (8 overs)		Stephan Baard 30 (35); Mohammad Nabi 5/12 (8.1 overs)

Afghanistan won by 190 runs
Wanderers Cricket Ground, Windhoek, Namibia
Umpires: Adrian Holdstock (SA) and Wynand Louw (Nam)

- Namibia won the toss and elected to field.
- Points: Afghanistan 2, Namibia 0

11 August 2013
Scorecard

Namibia; 193 all out (46.2 overs)	v	Afghanistan; 199/5 (31.4 overs)
Stephan Baard 67 (89); Hamid Hassan 4/32		Mohammad Shahzad 62 (64); Louis van der Westhuizen 2/45

Afghanistan won by 5 wickets
Wanderers Cricket Ground, Windhoek, Namibia
Umpires: Adrian Holdstock (SA) and Wynand Louw (Nam)

- Namibia, who chose to bat
- Points: Afghanistan 2, Namibia 0

=== Round 7 ===
27–28 August 2013
Scorecard

Netherlands; 143 (27.5 overs)	v	Canada; 62/1 (10 overs)
Ben Cooper 74 (59); Kenneth Kamyuka 4/38 (5.5 overs)		Hiral Patel 34* (35); Timm van der Gugten 1/10 (2 overs)

No result
Maple Leaf Cricket Club, King City, Ontario, Canada
Umpires: Gregory Brathwaite (WI) and Peter Nero (WI)

- Canada won the toss and elected to field
- Canada 1, Netherlands 1
Kenneth Kamyuka (Canada) and Ben Cooper (Netherlands) made their ODI debuts.

29 August 2013
Scorecard

Canada; 67 (24.4 overs)	v	Netherlands; 70/1 (10.4 overs)
Damodar Daesrath 31 (55); Timm van der Gugten 5/24 (9 overs)		Stephan Myburgh 52* (33); Jeremy Gordon 1/25 (4 overs)

Netherlands won by 9 wickets
Maple Leaf Cricket Club, King City, Ontario, Canada
Umpires: Gregory Brathwaite (WI) and Peter Nero (WI)

- Netherlands won the toss and elected to field
- Netherlands 2, Canada 0

6 September 2013
Scorecard

Scotland; 223/9 (50 overs)	v	Ireland; 225/9 (49.5 overs)
Preston Mommsen 91* (122); George Dockrell 4/24 (10 overs)		William Porterfield 62 (64); Majid Haq 3/26 (10 overs)

Ireland won by 1 wicket
Civil Service Cricket Club, Belfast, Northern Ireland
Umpires: Johan Cloete (SA) and Richard Smith (Ire)

- Scotland won the toss and elected to bat
- Ireland 2, Scotland 0
  • Scotland are eliminated from direct qualification to the 2015 Cricket World Cup.

8 September 2013
Scorecard

Scotland; 165 (49.3 overs)	v	Ireland; 166/3 (33 overs)
Calum MacLeod 39 (81); Kevin O'Brien 3/31 (10 overs)		Niall O'Brien 65* (70); Iain Wardlaw 2/60 (10 overs)

Ireland won by 7 wickets
Civil Service Cricket Club, Belfast, Northern Ireland
Umpires: Johan Cloete (SA) & Richard Smith (Ire)

- Scotland won the toss and elected to bat
- Ireland 2, Scotland 0

27 September 2013
Scorecard

United Arab Emirates; 197 (46.1 overs)	v	Namibia; 39 (24.4 overs)
Shaiman Anwar 54 (69); Louis van der Westhuizen 3/31 (7.1 overs)		Xander Pitchers 13 (33); Khurram Khan 3/2 (4.4 overs)

United Arab Emirates won by 158 runs
Sharjah Cricket Association Stadium, Sharjah, UAE
Umpires: Enamul Haque (Ban) & Sarika Prasad (Sin)

- Namibia won the toss and elected to field
- Points: United Arab Emirates 2, Namibia 0

29 September 2013
Scorecard

United Arab Emirates; 215 (50 overs)	v	Namibia; 80 (31.3 overs)
Shaiman Anwar 57 (75); Christi Viljoen 4/40 (10 overs)		Xander Pitchers 29 (47); Rohan Mustafa 3/8 (7 overs)

United Arab Emirates won by 135 runs
Sharjah Cricket Association Stadium, Sharjah, UAE
Umpires: Enamul Haque (Ban) & Sarika Prasad (Sin)

- Namibia won the toss and elected to field
- Points: United Arab Emirates 2, Namibia 0
  • Netherlands are eliminated from direct qualification to the 2015 Cricket World Cup.

2 October 2013
Scorecard

Kenya; 89 (37.5 ov)	v	Afghanistan; 95/2 (17.5 ov)
Morris Ouma 24 (48); Hamid Hassan 4/19 (10 overs)		Nawroz Mangal 57* (60); Hiren Varaiya 2/12 (1.5 overs)

Afghanistan won by 8 wickets
Sharjah Cricket Association Stadium, Sharjah, UAE
Umpires: Ruchira Palliyaguru (Sri) and Buddhi Pradhan (Nep)

- Kenya won the toss and elected to bat
- Points: Afghanistan 2, Kenya 0

4 October 2013
Scorecard

Afghanistan; 96/3 (20.5 overs)	v	Kenya; 93 (43.3 overs)
Mohammad Nabi 46* (42); Shem Ngoche 2/30 (4.5 overs)		Morris Ouma 39 (60); Hamza Hotak 3/19 (10 overs)

Afghanistan won by 7 wickets
Sharjah Cricket Association Stadium, Sharjah, UAE
Umpires: Ruchira Palliyaguru (Sri) and Buddhi Pradhan (Nep)

- Afghanistan won the toss and elected to field
- Points: Afghanistan 2, Kenya 0
  • United Arab Emirates are eliminated from direct qualification to the 2015 Cricket World Cup
  • Afghanistan have qualified for the 2015 Cricket World Cup

== Statistics ==
=== Most runs ===
The top five highest run scorers (total runs) are included in this table.

Player	Team	Runs	Inns	Avg	S/R	HS	100s	50s
Shaiman Anwar	United Arab Emirates	625	14	52.08	69.59	102*	1	5
Kyle Coetzer	Scotland	595	11	59.50	81.84	133	1	5
William Porterfield	Ireland	475	13	36.53	74.68	79	0	5
Ed Joyce	Ireland	462	11	51.33	73.10	96*	0	4
Mohammad Nabi	Afghanistan	423	11	52.87	101.92	81*	0	3

=== Most wickets ===
The following table contains the five leading wicket-takers in the tournament.

Player	Team	Wkts	Mts	Ave	S/R	Econ	BBI
Christi Viljoen	Namibia	23	14	21.78	30.7	4.25	4/40
George Dockrell	Ireland	21	13	17.00	30.2	3.28	4/24
Mudassar Bukhari	Netherlands	21	14	23.80	31.8	4.49	4/32
Mohammad Nabi	Afghanistan	20	13	18.35	30.9	3.56	5/12
Khurram Khan	United Arab Emirates	19	14	14.36	24.80	3.47	4/25
