= Hong Kong at the Men's T20 World Cup =

Tournament Performance

The Hong Kong national cricket team is one of the associate members of the International Cricket Council (ICC). They qualified for their maiden T20 World Cup in 2014 after finishing sixth in the 2013 qualifier. They managed to qualify for the next edition in 2016, but have not reached the global stage since then. They managed to defeat a full-member team, Bangladesh in their debut campaign.

Hong Kong did not make it past the first round in both of their appearances. They have an overall win–loss record of 1–5 from 6 matches.

== T20 World Cup record ==
Men's T20 World Cup record										Qualification record (Note: WCL Division One served as the qualifier for the 2007 edition. For subsequent events, only the final qualification event is considered.)				
Year	Round	Position	Pld	W	L	T	NR	Ab (Note: Abandoned matches are not counted in the official records.)	Captain	Pld	W	L	T	NR
(South Africa) 2007	Did not qualify									Did not participate				
(England) 2009	Did not qualify									Did not participate				
(Cricket West Indies) 2010	Did not qualify									Did not participate				
(Sri Lanka) 2012	Did not qualify									15	8	7	0	0
(Bangladesh) 2014	First stage	15/16	3	1	2	0	0	0	Jamie Atkinson	14	9	5	0	0
(India) 2016	First stage	16/16	3	0	3	0	0	0	Tanwir Afzal	8	4	3	0	1
(United Arab Emirates) (Oman) 2021	Did not qualify									7	3	4	0	0
(Australia) 2022	Did not qualify									5	2	3	0	0
(United States) (Cricket West Indies) 2024	Did not qualify									3	1	2	0	0
(India) (Sri Lanka) 2026	Did not qualify									6	4	1	0	1
Total	0 Titles	2/10	6	1	5	0	0	0	—N/a	58	31	25	0	2

=== Record by opponents ===
Opponent	M	W	L	T+W	T+L	NR	Ab	Win %	First played
Afghanistan	2	0	2	0	0	0	0	0.00	2014
Bangladesh	1	1	0	0	0	0	0	100	2014
Nepal	1	0	1	0	0	0	0	0.00	2014
Scotland	1	0	1	0	0	0	0	0.00	2016
Zimbabwe	1	0	1	0	0	0	0	0.00	2016
Total	6	1	5	0	0	0	0	16.67	—
Source: Last Updated: 12 March 2016

== Tournament results ==
=== Bangladesh 2014 ===
Squad and kit

- Jamie Atkinson (c)
- Waqas Barkat (vc)
- Mark Chapman
- Irfan Ahmed
- Nadeem Ahmed
- Haseeb Amjad
- Tanwir Afzal
- Babar Hayat
- Nizakat Khan
- Aizaz Khan
- Najeeb Amar
- Munir Dar
- Ehsan Nawaz
- Roy Lamsam
- Kinchit Shah

2014 kit

Results

First round (Group A)				Super 10		Semifinal	Final	Overall Result
Opposition Result	Opposition Result	Opposition Result	Rank	Opposition Result	Rank	Opposition Result	Opposition Result	Overall Result
Nepal; Lost by 80 runs	Afghanistan; Lost by 7 wickets	Bangladesh; Won by 2 wickets	4	Did not advance				First round
Source: Cricinfo

Scorecards

First stage (Group A)

16 March
Scorecard

Nepal; 149/8 (20 overs)	v	Hong Kong; 69 (17 overs)
Gyanendra Malla 48 (41); Haseeb Amjad 3/25 (4 overs)		Babar Hayat 20 (25); Shakti Gauchan 3/9 (4 overs)

Nepal won by 80 runs
Zohur Ahmed Chowdhury Stadium, Chittagong

18 March
Scorecard

Hong Kong; 153/8 (20 overs)	v	Afghanistan; 154/3 (18 overs)
Mark Chapman 38 (43); Shapoor Zadran 2/27 (4 overs); Mohammad Nabi 2/27 (4 overs)		Mohammad Shahzad 68 (53); Tanwir Afzal 1/19 (3 overs)

Afghanistan won by 7 wickets
Zohur Ahmed Chowdhury Stadium, Chittagong

20 March
Scorecard

Bangladesh; 108 (16.3 overs)	v	Hong Kong; 114/8 (19.4 overs)
Shakib Al Hasan 34 (27); Nadeem Ahmed 4/21 (3.3 overs)		Munir Dar 36 (27); Shakib Al Hasan 3/9 (4 overs)

Hong Kong won by 2 wickets
Zohur Ahmed Chowdhury Stadium, Chittagong

=== India 2016 ===
Squad and kit

- Tanwir Afzal (c)
- Mark Chapman (vc)
- Ryan Campbell
- Babar Hayat
- Aizaz Khan
- Nadeem Ahmed
- Nizakat Khan
- Waqas Barkat
- Kinchit Shah
- Haseeb Amjad
- Jamie Atkinson (wk)
- Waqas Khan
- Nadeem Ahmed
- Anshuman Rath
- Christopher Carter

2016 kit

Results

First round (Group B)				Super 10		Semifinal	Final	Overall Result
Opposition Result	Opposition Result	Opposition Result	Rank	Opposition Result	Rank	Opposition Result	Opposition Result	Overall Result
Zimbabwe; Lost by 14 runs	Afghanistan; Lost by 6 wickets	Scotland; Lost by 8 wickets (DLS)	4	Did not advance				First round
Source: Cricinfo

Scorecards

First stage (Group B)

8 March
15:00 (D/N)
Scorecard

Zimbabwe; 158/8 (20 overs)	v	Hong Kong; 144/6 (20 overs)
Vusi Sibanda 59 (46); Tanwir Afzal 2/19 (4 overs)		Jamie Atkinson 53 (44); Donald Tiripano 2/27 (4 overs)

Zimbabwe won by 14 runs
Vidarbha Cricket Association Stadium, Nagpur
Umpires: Aleem Dar (Pak) and Ian Gould (Eng)
Player of the match: Vusi Sibanda (Zim)

- Hong Kong won the toss and elected to field.
- Ryan Campbell (HK) became the oldest player to make his T20I debut (44 years and 30 days).

10 March
19:30 (D/N)
Scorecard

Hong Kong; 116/6 (20 overs)	v	Afghanistan; 119/4 (18 overs)
Anshuman Rath 28 (31); Mohammad Nabi 4/20 (4 overs)		Mohammad Shahzad 41 (40); Ryan Campbell 2/28 (4 overs)

Afghanistan won by 6 wickets
Vidarbha Cricket Association Stadium, Nagpur
Umpires: Ian Gould (Eng) and Richard Illingworth (Eng)
Player of the match: Mohammad Nabi (Afg)

- Hong Kong won the toss and elected to bat.
- Hong Kong were eliminated as a result of this match.

12 March
19:30 (D/N)
Scorecard

Hong Kong; 127/7 (20 overs)	v	Scotland; 78/2 (8 overs)
Mark Chapman 40 (41); Matt Machan 2/26 (4 overs)		Matthew Cross 22 (14); Aizaz Khan 1/11 (1 over)

Scotland won by 8 wickets (DLS method)
Vidarbha Cricket Association Stadium, Nagpur
Umpires: Marais Erasmus (SA) and Ian Gould (Eng)
Player of the match: Matt Machan (Sco)

- Hong Kong won the toss and elected to bat.
- Rain reduced Scotland's innings to 10 overs with a target of 76 runs.

== Records and statistics ==
=== Team records ===
Highest innings totals

Score	Opponent	Venue	Season
153/8 (20 overs)	Afghanistan	Chittagong	2014
144/6 (20 overs)	Zimbabwe	Nagpur	2016
127/7 (20 overs)	Scotland	Nagpur	2016
116/6 (20 overs)	Afghanistan	Nagpur	2016
114/8 (19.4 overs)	Bangladesh	Chittagong	2014
Last updated: 12 March 2016

=== Most appearances ===
This list consists players with most number of matches at the T20 World Cup.

Matches	Player	Period
6	Jamie Atkinson	2014-2016
6	Babar Hayat	2014-2016
6	Mark Chapman	2014-2016
6	Nadeem Ahmed	2014-2016
6	Nizakat Khan	2014-2016
6	Tanwir Afzal	2014-2016
Last updated: 12 March 2016

=== Batting statistics ===
Most runs

Runs	Player	Mat	Inn	HS	Avg	100s	50s	Period
126	Jamie Atkinson	6	6	53	21.00	—N/a	1	2014–2016
123	Mark Chapman	6	6	40	20.50	—N/a	—N/a	2014–2016
62	Anshuman Rath	3	3	28*	31.00	—N/a	—N/a	2016–2016
50	Waqas Barkat	3	3	32	16.66	—N/a	—N/a	2014–2014
50	Babar Hayat	6	6	20	8.33	—N/a	—N/a	2014–2016
Last updated: 12 March 2016

Highest partnerships

Runs	Players	Opposition	Venue	Season
60 (3rd wicket)	Waqas Barkat (23) & Mark Chapman (30)	v Afghanistan	Chittagong	2014
49 (4th wicket)	Mark Chapman (26) & Anshuman Rath (21)	v Scotland	Nagpur	2016
42 (2nd wicket)	Waqas Barkat (9) & Jamie Atkinson (31)	v Afghanistan	Chittagong	2014
40 (1st wicket)	Ryan Campbell (27) & Jamie Atkinson (7)	v Afghanistan	Nagpur	2016
34 (2nd wicket)	Irfan Ahmed (26) & Jamie Atkinson (7)	v Bangladesh	Chittagong	2014
Last updated: 12 March 2016

=== Bowling statistics ===
Most wickets

Wickets	Player	Matches	Avg.	Econ.	BBI	4W	5W	Period
9	Nadeem Ahmed	6	15.44	6.78	4/21	1	0	2014–2016
5	Tanwir Afzal	6	21.80	6.41	2/19	0	0	2014–2016
4	Aizaz Khan	5	29.75	7.93	2/33	0	0	2014–2016
4	Haseeb Amjad	5	34.25	9.13	3/25	0	0	2014–2016
3	Nizakat Khan	6	14.00	7.00	3/19	0	0	2014–2016
Last updated: 12 March 2016
