= Sharif Asadullah =

Pakistani cricketer

Personal information
- Born: 14 December 1984 (age 41); Karachi, Sindh, Pakistan
- Batting: Right-handed
- Bowling: Right-arm fast-medium

International information
- National side: United Arab Emirates (2011–2014)
- Only T20I (cap 13): 19 March 2014 v Ireland

Domestic team information
- Years: Team
- 2002: Karachi Blues
- 2003: Karachi
- 2004: Karachi Whites
- Source: CricketArchive, 2 February 2016

Sharif Asadullah (Urdu: شریف اسدالله; born 14 December 1984) is a Pakistani-born cricketer who played for the United Arab Emirates national cricket team. He made his debut for the United Arab Emirates national team in September 2011. He was born in Pakistan, and playing first-class cricket there before relocating to the UAE.

Asadullah was born in Karachi. He made his first-class debut in November 2002, playing for the Karachi Blues in a Quaid-i-Azam Trophy match against Peshawar. Following a reorganisation of the competition, the team Asadullah played for during the 2003–04 season was known simply as Karachi. However, the previous team names were restored for the following season, during which he represented the Karachi Whites. Although Asadullah played his last first-class match in Pakistan in November 2004, he continued to play at lower levels for several more seasons.

After relocating to the UAE, Asadullah made his debut for the national team in September 2011, against Afghanistan in a series that also featured the West Indies High Performance Centre and the West Indies senior team. The following month, he represented the UAE in two World Cricket League matches against Afghanistan, both played at the Sharjah Cricket Association Stadium. Asadullah's first-class debut for the UAE came in February 2012, in an Intercontinental Cup game against Scotland. He played another Intercontinental Cup match later in the year, against the Netherlands. Asadullah was selected in the UAE's squad for the 2014 World Twenty20, but played only a single match at the tournament, against Ireland. In the match, which held Twenty20 International status, he took 2/21 from his three overs.
