= Jeremy Gordon =

Canadian cricketer (born 1987)

Personal information
- Born: 20 January 1987 (age 39); New Amsterdam, Guyana
- Batting: Right-handed
- Bowling: Right-arm fast
- Role: Bowler

International information
- National side: Canada (2012–2024)
- ODI debut (cap 79): 11 July 2012 v Scotland
- Last ODI: 13 August 2024 v United States
- T20I debut (cap 41): 16 November 2013 v Ireland
- Last T20I: 24 August 2024 v United States

Domestic team information
- Years: Team
- 2006/07–2007/08: Guyana
- 2018–2014: Vancouver Knights
- 2019: Toronto Nationals
- 2023: Brampton Wolves

Career statistics
Competition	ODI	T20I	FC	LA
Matches	12	17	5	28
Runs scored	23	4	25	35
Batting average	4.60	4	12.50	5.00
100s/50s	0/0	0/0	0/0	0/0
Top score	7*	2*	16*	7*
Balls bowled	548	326	809	1,172
Wickets	19	20	23	36
Bowling average	25.52	20.35	21.08	25.27
5 wickets in innings	1	0	1	1
10 wickets in match	0	0	0	0
Best bowling	6/43	3/6	6/43	6/43
Catches/stumpings	1/–	3/–	1/–	1/–
- Source: Cricinfo, 31 October 2024

Jeremy Gordon (born 20 January 1987) is a Guyanese-born international cricketer. He has played for the Canada national cricket team since 2012 as a right-arm fast bowler.

Gordon was born in Guyana and represented the Guyana national cricket team before immigrating to Canada. He works professionally as a senior support analyst at Scotiabank.

== Early life ==
Gordon was born on 20 January 1987 in New Amsterdam, Guyana. He immigrated to Canada in 2006 but returned regularly to Guyana.

== International career ==
Gordon played at the under-19 level for Guyana in 2005 and 2006. He made his senior first-class debut for Guyana in January 2007 against Leeward Islands and went on to play two further senior matches for Guyana.

Gordon made his One Day International (ODI) debut for Canada against Scotland during the 2011–2013 ICC World Cricket League Championship and his Twenty20 International (T20I) debut against Ireland in the 2013 ICC World Twenty20 Qualifier. He played for Canada in the 2014 Cricket World Cup Qualifier. He took a break from international cricket between 2016 and 2018 for personal reasons.

He was a member of Canada's squad for the 2019 ICC T20 World Cup Qualifier tournament in the United Arab Emirates.

In March 2023, he was named in Canada's squad for the 2023 Cricket World Cup Qualifier Play-off. On 5 April 2023, he took his maiden five-wicket haul in ODIs, helping his team defeat Papua New Guinea by 90 runs.

In May 2024, he was named in Canada's squad for the 2024 ICC Men's T20 World Cup tournament.

== Franchise career ==
On 3 June 2018, he was selected to play for the Vancouver Knights in the players' draft for the inaugural edition of the Global T20 Canada tournament. In June 2019, he was selected to play for the Toronto Nationals franchise team in the 2019 Global T20 Canada tournament.
