= Salman Faris =

Emirati cricketer (born 1985)

Personal information
- Born: 18 November 1985 (age 40); Sri Lanka
- Batting: Left-handed

Domestic team information
- Years: Team
- United Arab Emirates
- Source: Cricinfo, 23 March 2014

Salman Faris (born 18 November 1985) is a Sri Lankan-born cricketer who played three One Day Internationals for the United Arab Emirates national cricket team. He played for the United Arab Emirates in the 2014 Cricket World Cup Qualifier tournament.
