= 2014 World Twenty20 =

Fifth edition of the ICC Men's T20 World Cup

2014 ICC World Twenty20
- Dates: 16 March – 6 April 2014
- Administrator: International Cricket Council
- Cricket format: Twenty20 International
- Tournament format(s): Group stage and Knockout
- Host: Bangladesh
- Champions: Sri Lanka (1st title)
- Runners-up: India
- Participants: 16
- Matches: 35
- Attendance: 667,543 (19,073 per match)
- Player of the series: (India) Virat Kohli
- Most runs: (India) Virat Kohli (319)
- Most wickets: (South Africa) Imran Tahir (12) (Netherlands) Ahsan Malik (12)
- Official website: www.icc-cricket.com

The 2014 ICC World Twenty20 was the fifth edition of the Men's T20 World Cup, formerly known as the ICC World Twenty20, an international Twenty20 cricket tournament, that took place in Bangladesh from 16 March to 6 April 2014. It was played in three cities — Dhaka, Chittagong and Sylhet. The International Cricket Council announced Bangladesh as host in 2010. This was the first Men's T20 World Cup where the use of Decision Review System (DRS) was implemented. It was the second consecutive time that an Asian country hosted the event, with Sri Lanka hosting the previous tournament in 2012. Sri Lanka won the title, beating India by 6 wickets in the final at Mirpur.

== Format ==
During the group stage, points were awarded to the teams as follows:

Results	Points
Win	2 points
No result/Tie	1 point
Loss	0 points

In the event of teams finishing on equal points in their group, the following tie-breakers were applied to determine their order in the table in the following order of priority: most wins, higher NRR(Net Run Rate), head-to-head record in matches involving the tied teams.

== Teams ==
For the first time, the tournament featured 16 teams. All ten full members of the ICC qualified automatically, joined by the six associate members that qualified through the 2013 World Twenty20 Qualifier. The qualifying teams were Ireland, Afghanistan, Netherlands and making their World Twenty20 debut the UAE, Nepal and Hong Kong.

The first round consisted of 8 teams and 2 teams moved to next round. The second round was the Super 10 stage which consisted of 2 groups of 5 teams each. The top eight full member nations in the ICC T20I Championship rankings as of 8 October 2012 automatically progressed to the Super 10 stage of 2014 ICC World Twenty20.

Joining the eight full members in the super 10 stage was host nation Bangladesh (also a full member) and associate nation The Netherlands who topped their first round group by net run rate ahead of Test playing nation Zimbabwe and Ireland.

Qualification	Country
Host	Bangladesh
Full Members	Australia
Full Members	England
Full Members	India
Full Members	New Zealand
Full Members	Pakistan
Full Members	South Africa
Full Members	Sri Lanka
Full Members	West Indies
Full Members	Zimbabwe
Qualifier	Ireland
Qualifier	Afghanistan
Qualifier	Nepal
Qualifier	United Arab Emirates
Qualifier	Netherlands
Qualifier	Hong Kong

== Match officials ==
The match referees' responsibilities throughout the tournament were shared between four members of the Elite Panel of ICC Referees:

- (Australia) David Boon
- (Sri Lanka) Ranjan Madugalle
- (Sri Lanka) Roshan Mahanama
- (India) Javagal Srinath

The on-field responsibilities for officiating the tournament were shared by all 11 of the Elite Panel of ICC Umpires and 3 umpires from the International Panel of Umpires and Referees:

- (New Zealand) Billy Bowden
- (Pakistan) Aleem Dar
- (Australia) Steve Davis
- (Sri Lanka) Kumar Dharmasena
- (South Africa) Marais Erasmus
- (England) Ian Gould
- (England) Richard Illingworth
- (England) Richard Kettleborough
- (England) Nigel Llong
- (Sri Lanka) Ranmore Martinesz
- (Australia) Bruce Oxenford
- (India) Sundaram Ravi
- (Australia) Paul Reiffel
- (Australia) Rod Tucker

== Venues ==
Thirty-one matches were played at three venues in Dhaka, Chittagong and Sylhet.

Venues of 2014 ICC World T20 in Bangladesh

Chittagong	Dhaka	Sylhet
Zahur Ahmed Chowdhury Stadium	Sher-e-Bangla National Cricket Stadium	Sylhet International Cricket Stadium
Capacity: 20,000	Capacity: 26,000	Capacity: 18,500
|	Sher-e-Bangla National Cricket Stadium	Sylhet International Cricket Stadium
Matches: 15	Matches: 14 (SF-1), (SF-2) & (Final)	Matches: 6

== Warm-up matches ==
16 warm-up matches were played between 12 and 19 March featuring all 16 teams.

Fixtures

12 March
15:30
Scorecard

Afghanistan; 150/7 (20 overs)	v	Netherlands; 86 (12.3 overs)
Mohammad Nabi 40 (25); Ahsan Malik 3/28 (4 overs)		Michael Swart 21 (15); Aftab Alam 4/25 (3 overs)

Afghanistan won by 35 runs (D/L method)
Zohur Ahmed Chowdhury Stadium, Chittagong
Umpires: S. Ravi (Ind) and Rod Tucker (Aus)

- Afghanistan won the toss and elected to bat
- A floodlight problem at the start of the Netherlands' innings reduced their target to 122 runs from 15 overs according to the Duckworth-Lewis method.

12 March
15:30
Scorecard

United Arab Emirates; 142/7 (20 overs)	v	Bangladesh; 146/6 (18.5 overs)
Khurram Khan 44 (35); Farhad Reza 2/25 (2 overs)		Tamim Iqbal 43 (30); Manjula Guruge 2/25 (4 overs); Amjad Javed 2/25 (4 overs)

Bangladesh won by 4 wickets
Shaheed Ria Gope Cricket Stadium, Fatullah
Umpires: Billy Bowden (NZ) and Steve Davis (Aus)

- United Arab Emirates won the toss and elected to bat

12 March
19:30 (D/N)
Scorecard

Zimbabwe; 153/7 (20 overs)	v	Hong Kong; 159/6 (20 overs)
Elton Chigumbura 45* (28); Irfan Ahmed 3/25 (4 overs)		Mark Chapman 53* (33); Prosper Utseya 3/19 (4 overs)

Hong Kong won by 4 wickets
Zohur Ahmed Chowdhury Stadium, Chittagong
Umpires: Aleem Dar (Pak) and Paul Reiffel (Aus)

- Hong Kong won the toss and elected to field

12 March
19:30
Scorecard

Nepal; 137/7 (20 overs)	v	Ireland; 141/5 (19.1 overs)
Gyanendra Malla 47 (35); Andrew McBrine 2/22 (4 overs)		William Porterfield 38 (35); Jitendra Mukhiya 3/24 (3.1 overs)

Ireland won by 5 wickets
Shaheed Ria Gope Cricket Stadium, Fatullah
Umpires: Marais Erasmus (SA) and Ian Gould (Eng)

- Ireland won the toss and elected to field

14 March
09:30
Scorecard

Afghanistan; 168/6 (20 overs)	v	Zimbabwe; 173/3 (19.3 overs)
Shafiqullah 31 (19); Natsai M'Shangwe 2/19 (3 overs)		Hamilton Masakadza 93 (52); Hamza Hotak 1/28 (4 overs)

Zimbabwe won by 7 wickets
M. A. Aziz Stadium, Chittagong
Umpires: Paul Reiffel (Aus) and Rod Tucker (Aus)

- Zimbabwe won the toss and chose to field

14 March
09:30
Scorecard

Nepal; 95 (20 overs)	v	United Arab Emirates; 99/4 (18.5 overs)
Subash Khakurel 28 (33); Sharif Asadullah 3/15 (4 overs)		Swapnil Patil 33 (41); Sompal Kami 1/17 (4 overs); Shakti Gauchan 1/17 (4 overs)

United Arab Emirates won by 6 wickets
Shaheed Ria Gope Cricket Stadium, Fatullah
Umpires: Nigel Llong (Eng) and Bruce Oxenford (Aus)

- United Arab Emirates won the toss and chose to field

14 March
13:30
Scorecard

Hong Kong; 127 (19.5 overs)	v	Netherlands; 100 (16.5 overs)
Mark Chapman 50 (40); Timm van der Gugten 3/17 (4 overs)		Stephan Myburgh 52 (38); Haseeb Amjad 6/21 (3.5 overs)

Hong Kong won by 27 runs
M. A. Aziz Stadium, Chittagong
Umpires: Aleem Dar (Pak) and S. Ravi (Ind)

- Netherlands won the toss and chose to field

14 March
13:30
Scorecard

Bangladesh; 179/3 (20 overs)	v	Ireland; 135/8 (20 overs)
Mushfiqur Rahim 59* (30); Paul Stirling 1/18 (4 overs)		William Porterfield 44 (44); Shakib Al Hasan 2/13 (3 overs)

Bangladesh won by 44 runs
Shaheed Ria Gope Cricket Stadium, Fatullah
Umpires: Richard Illingworth (Eng) and Richard Kettleborough (Eng)

- Bangladesh won the toss and chose to bat

17 March
15:30
Scorecard

New Zealand; 145/9 (20 overs)	v	Pakistan; 149/3 (19.5 overs)
Brendon McCullum 59 (45); Umar Gul 3/16 (4 overs)		Mohammad Hafeez 55 (39); Nathan McCullum 2/21 (4 overs)

Pakistan won by 7 wickets
Sher-e-Bangla National Cricket Stadium, Dhaka
Umpires: Kumar Dharmasena (SL) and Richard Kettleborough (Eng)

- New Zealand won the toss and elected to bat

17 March
19:30 (D/N)
Scorecard

Sri Lanka; 153/6 (20 overs)	v	India; 148 (20 overs)
Mahela Jayawardene 30 (20); Ravichandran Ashwin 3/22 (4 overs)		Suresh Raina 41 (31); Lasith Malinga 4/30 (4 overs)

Sri Lanka won by 5 runs
Sher-e-Bangla National Cricket Stadium, Dhaka
Umpires: Richard Illingworth (Eng) and Nigel Llong (Eng)

- India won the toss and elected to field

18 March
15:30
Scorecard

England; 131/7 (20 overs)	v	West Indies; 132/3 (16.1 overs)
Eoin Morgan 43* (42); Krishmar Santokie 3/24 (4 overs)		Chris Gayle 58* (38); Stephen Parry 1/15 (2.1 overs)

West Indies won by 7 wickets
Shaheed Ria Gope Cricket Stadium, Fatullah
Umpires: Anisur Rahman (Ban) and Enamul Haque (Ban)

- England won the toss and elected to bat

18 March
19:30 (D/N)
Scorecard

Bangladesh A 116 (18.4 overs)	v	South Africa; 122/5 (18.3 overs)
Muktar Ali 35* (20); Dale Steyn 2/10 (2.2 overs)		Farhaan Behardien 36* (31); Taijul Islam 3/12 (4 overs)

South Africa won by 5 wickets
Shaheed Ria Gope Cricket Stadium, Fatullah
Umpires: Anisur Rahman (Ban) and Enamul Haque (Ban)

- Bangladesh A won the toss and elected to bat

19 March
14:30
Scorecard

Australia; 200/7 (20 overs)	v	New Zealand; 197/9 (20 overs)
David Warner 65 (26); Kyle Mills 2/21 (4 overs)		Martin Guptill 62 (34); Mitchell Starc 2/21 (3 overs)

Australia won by 3 runs
Shaheed Ria Gope Cricket Stadium, Fatullah
Umpires: Enamul Haque (Ban) and Sharfuddoula (Ban)

- Australia won the toss and elected to bat

19 March
15:30
Scorecard

West Indies; 172/5 (20 overs)	v	Sri Lanka; 139 (19.2 overs)
Dwayne Smith 60 (45); Rangana Herath 2/20 (4 overs)		Tillakaratne Dilshan 43 (36); Sunil Narine 4/24 (4 overs)

West Indies won by 33 runs
Sher-e-Bangla National Cricket Stadium, Dhaka
Umpires: Kumar Dharmasena (SL) and Nigel Llong (Eng)

- Sri Lanka won the toss and elected to field

19 March
19:30 (D/N)
Scorecard

India; 178/4 (20 overs)	v	England; 158/6 (20 overs)
Virat Kohli 74* (48); Ravi Bopara 1/25 (2 overs)		Moeen Ali 46 (38); Ravindra Jadeja 2/23 (3 overs)

India won by 20 runs
Sher-e-Bangla National Cricket Stadium, Dhaka
Umpires: Richard Illingworth (Eng) and Richard Kettleborough (Eng)

- England won the toss and elected to field

19 March
19:30 (D/N)
Scorecard

Pakistan; 71 (17.3 overs)	v	South Africa; 72/2 (14 overs)
Umar Akmal 17 (24); Wayne Parnell 2/2 (1.3 overs)		Hashim Amla 24 (20); Shahid Afridi 1/8 (3 overs)

South Africa won by 8 wickets
Shaheed Ria Gope Cricket Stadium, Fatullah
Umpires: Enamul Haque (Ban) and Sharfuddoula (Ban)

- Pakistan won the toss and elected to bat

== First stage ==
Play in the Group stage of the 2014 ICC World Twenty20 took place from 16 March to 21 March 2014.

=== Group A ===
Pos	Team	Pld	W	L	NR	Pts	NRR
1	Bangladesh	3	2	1	0	4	1.466
2	Nepal	3	2	1	0	4	0.933
3	Afghanistan	3	1	2	0	2	−0.981
4	Hong Kong	3	1	2	0	2	−1.455

Source: ESPN Cricinfo

==== Matches ====
16 March
15:30
Scorecard

Afghanistan; 72 (17.1 overs)	v	Bangladesh; 78/1 (12 overs)
Gulbodin Naib 21 (22); Shakib Al Hasan 3/8 (3.1 overs)		Anamul Haque 44* (33); Samiullah Shenwari 1/14 (3 overs)

Bangladesh won by 9 wickets
Sher-e-Bangla National Cricket Stadium, Dhaka
Umpires: Nigel Llong (Eng) and Richard Illingworth (Eng)
Player of the match: Shakib Al Hasan (Ban)

- Bangladesh won the toss and elected to field.
- Najeeb Tarakai (Afg) made his T20I debut.
- 72 all out is the lowest total for Afghanistan in T20Is and is the lowest total against Bangladesh in T20Is by any team.
- Victory by 9 Wickets with 48 balls remaining is the largest victory for Bangladesh in T20Is for both the "by wickets" and "by balls" remaining margins.
- Losing by 9 Wickets with 48 balls remaining is the largest loss for Afghanistan in T20Is for both the "by wickets" and "by balls" remaining margins.

16 March
19:30 (D/N)
Scorecard

Nepal; 149/8 (20 overs)	v	Hong Kong; 69 (17 overs)
Gyanendra Malla 48 (41); Haseeb Amjad 3/25 (4 overs)		Babar Hayat 20 (25); Shakti Gauchan 3/9 (4 overs)

Nepal won by 80 runs
Zohur Ahmed Chowdhury Stadium, Chittagong
Umpires: Aleem Dar (Pak) and Rod Tucker (Aus)
Player of the match: Shakti Gauchan (Nep)

- Hong Kong won the toss and elected to field.
- 1st T20I for both Nepal and Hong Kong
- Najeeb Amar is the oldest debutant in T20I.
- Paras Khadka got a wicket in his 1st ball in T20I
- 69 all out is the second lowest total in ICC World Twenty20 history and the 5th lowest total in Twenty20 International history.

18 March
15:30
Scorecard

Hong Kong; 153/8 (20 overs)	v	Afghanistan; 154/3 (18 overs)
Mark Chapman 38 (43); Zadran, Nabi 2/27 (4 overs)		Mohammad Shahzad 68 (53); Tanwir Afzal 1/19 (3 overs)

Afghanistan won by 7 wickets
Zohur Ahmed Chowdhury Stadium, Chittagong
Umpires: Sundaram Ravi (Ind) and Paul Reiffel (Aus)
Player of the match: Mohammad Shahzad (Afg)

- Hong Kong won the toss and elected to bat.
- Hong Kong were eliminated as a result of this match

18 March
19:30 (D/N)
Scorecard

Nepal; 126/5 (20 overs)	v	Bangladesh; 132/2 (15.3 overs)
Paras Khadka 41 (35); Al-Amin Hossain 2/17 (4 overs)		Anamul Haque 42 (33); Basanta Regmi 1/14 (3 overs)

Bangladesh won by 8 wickets
Zohur Ahmed Chowdhury Stadium, Chittagong
Umpires: Rod Tucker (Aus) and Aleem Dar (Pak)
Player of the match: Al-Amin Hossain (Ban)

- Bangladesh won the toss and elected to field.

20 March
15:30
Scorecard

Nepal; 141/5 (20 overs)	v	Afghanistan; 132/8 (20 overs)
Subash Khakurel 56 (53); Shapoor Zadran 2/19 (4 overs)		Asghar Stanikzai 49 (36); Jitendra Mukhiya 3/18 (4 overs)

Nepal won by 9 runs
Zohur Ahmed Chowdhury Stadium, Chittagong
Umpires: Sundaram Ravi (Ind) and Aleem Dar (Pak)
Player of the match: Jitendra Mukhiya (Nep)

- Afghanistan won the toss and elected to field.
- Afghanistan were eliminated as a result of this match

20 March
19:30 (D/N)
Scorecard

Bangladesh; 108 (16.3 overs)	v	Hong Kong; 114/8 (19.4 overs)
Shakib Al Hasan 34 (27); Nadeem Ahmed 4/21 (3.3 overs)		Munir Dar 36 (27); Shakib Al Hasan 3/9 (4 overs)

Hong Kong won by 2 wickets
Zohur Ahmed Chowdhury Stadium, Chittagong
Umpires: Rod Tucker (Aus) and Paul Reiffel (Aus)
Player of the match: Nadeem Ahmed (HK)

- Hong Kong won the toss and elected to field.
- Bangladesh qualified for the Super Ten and Nepal were eliminated as a result of this match.
- 1st victory in International cricket for Hong Kong.

=== Group B ===
Pos	Team	Pld	W	L	NR	Pts	NRR
1	Netherlands	3	2	1	0	4	1.109
2	Zimbabwe	3	2	1	0	4	0.957
3	Ireland	3	2	1	0	4	−0.701
4	United Arab Emirates	3	0	3	0	0	−1.541

Source: ESPN Cricinfo

==== Matches ====
17 March
15:30
Scorecard

Zimbabwe; 163/5 (20 overs)	v	Ireland; 164/7 (20 overs)
Brendan Taylor 59 (46); George Dockrell 2/18 (4 overs)		Paul Stirling 60 (34); Tinashe Panyangara 4/37 (4 overs)

Ireland won by 3 wickets
Sylhet International Cricket Stadium, Sylhet
Umpires: Steve Davis (Aus) and Marais Erasmus (SA)
Player of the match: Paul Stirling (Ire)

- Ireland won the toss and chose to field.
- 1st T20I between the two teams
- Closest victory for Ireland in terms of wickets and balls remaining in all T20I
- Closest defeat for Zimbabwe in terms of wickets and balls remaining in all T20I

17 March
19:30 (D/N)
Scorecard

United Arab Emirates; 151 (19.5 overs)	v	Netherlands; 152/4 (18.5 overs)
Shaiman Anwar 32 (19); Ahsan Malik 3/16 (3.5 overs)		Stephan Myburgh 55 (36); Kamran Shazad 2/19 (4 overs)

Netherlands won by 6 wickets
Sylhet International Cricket Stadium, Sylhet
Umpires: Billy Bowden (NZ) and Ian Gould (Eng)
Player of the match: Tom Cooper (Ned)

- United Arab Emirates won the toss and elected to bat.
- 1st T20I for United Arab Emirates

19 March
15:30
Scorecard

Netherlands; 140/5 (20 overs)	v	Zimbabwe; 146/5 (20 overs)
Tom Cooper 72 (58); Prosper Utseya 2/24 (4 overs)		Brendan Taylor 49 (39); Pieter Seelaar 2/9 (2 overs)

Zimbabwe won by 5 wickets
Sylhet International Cricket Stadium, Sylhet
Umpires: Steve Davis (Aus) and Bruce Oxenford (Aus)
Player of the match: Brendan Taylor (Zim)

- Netherlands won the toss and elected to bat.

19 March
19:30 (D/N)
Scorecard

United Arab Emirates; 123/6 (20 overs)	v	Ireland; 103/3 (14.2 overs)
Shaiman Anwar 30 (28); Paul Stirling 2/12 (3 overs)		Ed Joyce 43 (38); Sharif Asadullah 2/21 (3 overs)

Ireland won by 21 runs (D/L method)
Sylhet International Cricket Stadium, Sylhet
Umpires: Marais Erasmus (SA) and Ian Gould (Eng)
Player of the match: Ed Joyce (Ire)

- Ireland won the toss and elected to field
- Play was interrupted by floodlight failure and eventually stopped by rain after 14.2 overs during Ireland's innings. Their par score was 82 runs according to the Duckworth–Lewis method.
- United Arab Emirates were eliminated as a result of this match

21 March
11:30
Scorecard

United Arab Emirates; 116/9 (20 overs)	v	Zimbabwe; 118/5 (13.4 overs)
Swapnil Patil 30 (26); Sean Williams 3/15 (4 overs)		Elton Chigumbura 53* (21); Manjula Guruge 2/18 (4 overs)

Zimbabwe won by 5 wickets
Sylhet International Cricket Stadium, Sylhet
Umpires: Billy Bowden (NZ) and Bruce Oxenford (Aus)
Player of the match: Elton Chigumbura (Zim)

- Zimbabwe won the toss and elected to field

21 March
15:30
Scorecard

Ireland; 189/4 (20 overs)	v	Netherlands; 193/4 (13.5 overs)
Andrew Poynter 57 (38); Ahsan Malik 2/26 (4 overs)		Stephan Myburgh 63 (23); Kevin O'Brien 2/29 (3 overs)

Netherlands won by 6 wickets
Sylhet International Cricket Stadium, Sylhet
Umpires: Steve Davis (Aus) and Ian Gould (Eng)
Player of the match: Stephan Myburgh (Ned)

- Netherlands won the toss and elected to field
- To qualify for the Super Ten, Netherlands had to win in 14.2 overs or less.
- Netherlands qualified for the Super Ten and Zimbabwe and Ireland were eliminated as a result of this match

== Super 10 ==
Play in the Super 10s stage of the 2014 ICC World Twenty20 took place from 21 March to 1 April 2014. The top eight Full Member nations in the ICC T20I Championship rankings as of 8 October 2012 automatically progressed to the Super 10 stage of 2014 ICC World Twenty20.

Qualification	Super 10	
Qualification	Group 1	Group 2
Rankings	England	Australia
Rankings	New Zealand	India
Rankings	South Africa	Pakistan
Rankings	Sri Lanka	West Indies
Advanced from First Stage	Netherlands	Bangladesh

=== Group 1 ===
Pos	Team	Pld	W	L	NR	Pts	NRR
1	Sri Lanka	4	3	1	0	6	2.233
2	South Africa	4	3	1	0	6	0.075
3	New Zealand	4	2	2	0	4	−0.678
4	England	4	1	3	0	2	−0.776
5	Netherlands	4	1	3	0	2	−0.866

Source: ESPN Cricinfo

==== Matches ====
22 March
15:30
Scorecard

Sri Lanka; 165/7 (20 overs)	v	South Africa; 160/8 (20 overs)
Kusal Perera 61 (40); Imran Tahir 3/26 (4 overs)		JP Duminy 39 (30); Sachithra Senanayake 2/22 (4 overs)

Sri Lanka won by 5 runs
Zohur Ahmed Chowdhury Stadium, Chittagong
Umpires: Sundaram Ravi (Ind) and Rod Tucker (Aus)
Player of the match: Kusal Perera (SL)

- Sri Lanka won the toss and elected to bat.

22 March
19:30 (D/N)
Scorecard

England; 172/6 (20 overs)	v	New Zealand; 52/1 (5.2 overs)
Moeen Ali 36 (23); Corey Anderson 2/32 (4 overs)		Kane Williamson 24* (17); Jade Dernbach 1/13 (2 overs)

New Zealand won by 9 runs (D/L method)
Zohur Ahmed Chowdhury Stadium, Chittagong
Umpires: Aleem Dar (Pak) and Paul Reiffel (Aus)
Player of the match: Corey Anderson (NZ)

- New Zealand won the toss and elected to field.
- Rain stopped play after 5.2 overs during New Zealand's innings. Their par score was 43 runs according to the Duckworth-Lewis method.
- England captain Stuart Broad was fined 15% of his match fee for criticism of the umpire's decision to play during a thunderstorm.

24 March
15:30
Scorecard

South Africa; 170/6 (20 overs)	v	New Zealand; 168/8 (20 overs)
JP Duminy 86* (43); Corey Anderson 2/28 (3 overs)		Ross Taylor 62 (37); Dale Steyn 4/17 (4 overs)

South Africa won by 2 runs
Zohur Ahmed Chowdhury Stadium, Chittagong
Umpires: Aleem Dar (Pak) and Sundaram Ravi (Ind)
Player of the match: JP Duminy (SA)

- New Zealand won the toss and elected to field.
- Due to slow over rate South African captain Faf du Plessis was fined 40% of his match fees and rest of the team 20%

24 March
19:30 (D/N)
Scorecard

Netherlands; 39 (10.3 overs)	v	Sri Lanka; 40/1 (5 overs)
Tom Cooper 16 (18); Ajantha Mendis 3/12 (2.3 overs)		Kusal Perera 14 (10); Ahsan Malik 1/18 (2 overs)

Sri Lanka won by 9 wickets
Zohur Ahmed Chowdhury Stadium, Chittagong
Umpires: Paul Reiffel (Aus) and Rod Tucker (Aus)
Player of the match: Angelo Mathews (SL)

- Sri Lanka won the toss and elected to field.
- The Netherlands total is the lowest by any team in a T20I match.
- Biggest victory in terms of balls remaining in all T20I.

27 March
15:30
Scorecard

South Africa; 145/9 (20 overs)	v	Netherlands; 139 (18.4 overs)
Hashim Amla 43 (22); Ahsan Malik 5/19 (4 overs)		Stephan Myburgh 51 (28); Imran Tahir 4/21 (4 overs)

South Africa won by 6 runs
Zohur Ahmed Chowdhury Stadium, Chittagong
Umpires: Steve Davis (Aus) and Bruce Oxenford (Aus)
Player of the match: Imran Tahir (SA)

- Netherlands won the toss and elected to field.
- Due to a slow over rate South African captain Faf du Plessis was banned from the next match and fined 20% of his match fees

27 March
19:30 (D/N)
Scorecard

Sri Lanka; 189/4 (20 overs)	v	England; 190/4 (19.2 overs)
Mahela Jayawardene 89 (51); Chris Jordan 2/28 (4 overs)		Alex Hales 116* (64); Nuwan Kulasekara 4/31 (4 overs)

England won by 6 wickets
Zohur Ahmed Chowdhury Stadium, Chittagong
Umpires: Aleem Dar (Pak) and Rod Tucker (Aus)
Player of the match: Alex Hales (Eng)

- England won the toss and elected to field.
- Alex Hales' 116* is the highest score by an England player in T20Is.
- Due to a slow over rate Sri Lankan captain Dinesh Chandimal was banned from the next match and fined 20% of his match fees

29 March
15:30
Scorecard

Netherlands; 151/4 (20 overs)	v	New Zealand; 152/4 (19 overs)
Peter Borren 49 (35); Nathan McCullum 1/20 (4 overs)		Brendon McCullum 65 (45); Timm van der Gugten 3/30 (4 overs)

New Zealand won by 6 wickets.
Zohur Ahmed Chowdhury Stadium, Chittagong
Umpires: Aleem Dar (Pak) and Bruce Oxenford (Aus)
Player of the match: Brendon McCullum (NZ)

- New Zealand won the toss and elected to field.
- Netherlands were eliminated as a result of this match
- Brendon McCullum became the first batsman to reach 2000 runs in Twenty20 Internationals.

29 March
19:30 (D/N)
Scorecard

South Africa; 196/5 (20 overs)	v	England; 193/7 (20 overs)
AB de Villiers 69* (28); James Tredwell 1/25 (3 overs)		Alex Hales 38 (22); Wayne Parnell 3/31 (4 overs)

South Africa won by 3 runs
Zohur Ahmed Chowdhury Stadium, Chittagong
Umpires: Steve Davis (Aus) and Rod Tucker (Aus)
Player of the match: AB de Villiers (SA)

- England won the toss and elected to field.
- AB de Villiers scored the fastest T20I fifty for South Africa
- With this result England were eliminated and South Africa qualified for the Semi-finals.

31 March
15:30
Scorecard

Netherlands; 133/5 (20 overs)	v	England; 88 (17.4 overs)
Wesley Barresi 48 (45); Stuart Broad 3/24 (4 overs)		Ravi Bopara 18 (20); Mudassar Bukhari 3/12 (3.4 overs)

Netherlands won by 45 runs
Zohur Ahmed Chowdhury Stadium, Chittagong
Umpires: Steve Davis (Aus) and Bruce Oxenford (Aus)
Player of the match: Mudassar Bukhari (Ned)

- England won the toss and elected to field.
- 88 is the lowest total of a Full Member Nation against an associate nation.

31 March
19:30 (D/N)
Scorecard

Sri Lanka; 119 (19.2 overs)	v	New Zealand; 60 (15.3 overs)
Mahela Jayawardene 25 (32); Trent Boult 3/20 (4 overs)		Kane Williamson 42 (43); Rangana Herath 5/3 (3.3 overs)

Sri Lanka won by 59 runs
Zohur Ahmed Chowdhury Stadium, Chittagong
Umpires: Aleem Dar (Pak) and Rod Tucker (Aus)
Player of the match: Rangana Herath (SL)

- New Zealand won the toss and elected to field.
- With this result New Zealand were eliminated and Sri Lanka qualified for the Semi-finals.
- New Zealand 60 all out is the lowest score by a test playing nation in Twenty20 Internationals
- Kane Williamson scoring 42 out the total of 60 - his 70% was the highest percentage contribution to a team's total in a Twenty20 Internationals

=== Group 2 ===
Pos	Team	Pld	W	L	NR	Pts	NRR
1	India	4	4	0	0	8	1.280
2	West Indies	4	3	1	0	6	1.971
3	Pakistan	4	2	2	0	4	−0.384
4	Australia	4	1	3	0	2	−0.875
5	Bangladesh	4	0	4	0	0	−2.072

Source: ESPN Cricinfo

==== Matches ====
21 March
19:30 (D/N)
Scorecard

Pakistan; 130/7 (20 overs)	v	India; 131/3 (18.3 overs)
Umar Akmal 33 (30); Amit Mishra 2/22 (4 overs)		Virat Kohli 36* (32); Bilawal Bhatti 1/17 (2 overs)

India won by 7 wickets
Sher-e-Bangla National Cricket Stadium, Dhaka
Umpires: Kumar Dharmasena (SL) and Richard Kettleborough (Eng)
Player of the match: Amit Mishra (Ind)

- India won the toss and elected to field.
- Mohammed Shami (India) made his T20I debut.

23 March
15:30
Scorecard

Pakistan; 191/5 (20 overs)	v	Australia; 175 (20 overs)
Umar Akmal 94 (54); Nathan Coulter-Nile 2/36 (4 overs)		Glenn Maxwell 74 (33); Zulfiqar Babar 2/26 (4 overs)

Pakistan won by 16 runs
Sher-e-Bangla National Cricket Stadium, Dhaka
Umpires: Richard Kettleborough (Eng) and Nigel Llong (Eng)
Player of the match: Umar Akmal (Pak)

- Australia won the toss and elected to field.
- Glenn Maxwell scored the 3rd-fastest half century in Twenty20 Internationals.

23 March
19:30 (D/N)
Scorecard

West Indies; 129/7 (20 overs)	v	India; 130/3 (19.4 overs)
Chris Gayle 34 (33); Ravindra Jadeja 3/48 (4 overs)		Rohit Sharma 62* (55); Andre Russell 1/12 (2 overs)

India won by 7 wickets
Sher-e-Bangla National Cricket Stadium, Dhaka
Umpires: Kumar Dharmasena (SL) and Richard Illingworth (Eng)
Player of the match: Amit Mishra (Ind)

- India won the toss and elected to field.
- This was India's first victory against West Indies in ICC World Twenty20.

25 March
19:30 (D/N)
Scorecard

West Indies; 171/7 (20 overs)	v	Bangladesh; 98 (19.1 overs)
Dwayne Smith 72 (43); Al-Amin Hossain 3/21 (4 overs)		Mushfiqur Rahim 22 (22); Samuel Badree 4/15 (4 overs)

West Indies won by 73 runs
Sher-e-Bangla National Cricket Stadium, Dhaka
Umpires: Richard Kettleborough (Eng) and Nigel Llong (Eng)
Player of the match: Dwayne Smith (WI)

- Bangladesh won the toss and elected to field.

28 March
15:30
Scorecard

Australia; 178/8 (20 overs)	v	West Indies; 179/4 (19.4 overs)
Glenn Maxwell 45 (22); Sunil Narine 2/19 (4 overs)		Chris Gayle 53 (35); Mitchell Starc 2/50 (4 overs)

West Indies won by 6 wickets
Sher-e-Bangla National Cricket Stadium, Dhaka
Umpires: Marais Erasmus (SA) and Ian Gould (Eng)
Player of the match: Darren Sammy (WI)

- Australia won the toss and elected to bat.

28 March
19:30 (D/N)
Scorecard

Bangladesh; 138/7 (20 overs)	v	India; 141/2 (18.3 overs)
Anamul Haque 44 (43); Amit Mishra 3/26 (4 overs)		Virat Kohli 57* (50); Mashrafe Mortaza 1/23 (4 overs)

India won by 8 wickets
Sher-e-Bangla National Cricket Stadium, Dhaka
Umpires: Kumar Dharmasena (SL) and Richard Kettleborough (Eng)
Player of the match: Ravichandran Ashwin (Ind)

- India won the toss and elected to field.
- India qualified for the Semi-finals as a result of this match.

30 March
15:30
Scorecard

Pakistan; 190/5 (20 overs)	v	Bangladesh; 140/7 (20 overs)
Ahmed Shehzad 111*(62); Abdur Razzak 2/20 (4 overs)		Shakib Al Hasan 38 (32); Umar Gul 3/30 (4 overs)

Pakistan won by 50 runs
Sher-e-Bangla National Cricket Stadium, Dhaka
Umpires: Ian Gould (Eng) and Richard Kettleborough (Eng)
Player of the match: Ahmed Shehzad (Pak)

- Pakistan won the toss and elected to bat.
- Australia and Bangladesh were eliminated as a result of this match.
- Ahmed Shehzad became the first Pakistani batsmen to score a century in Twenty20 Internationals.

30 March
19:30 (D/N)
Scorecard

India; 159/7 (20 overs)	v	Australia; 86 (16.2 overs)
Yuvraj Singh 60 (43); Glenn Maxwell 1/20 (4 overs)		Glenn Maxwell 23 (12); Ravichandran Ashwin 4/11 (3.2 overs)

India won by 73 runs
Sher-e-Bangla National Cricket Stadium, Dhaka
Umpires: Kumar Dharmasena (SL) and Marais Erasmus (SA)
Player of the match: Ravichandran Ashwin (Ind)

- Australia won the toss and elected to field.
- Mohit Sharma (India) made his Twenty20 International debut.

1 April
15:30
Scorecard

Bangladesh; 153/5 (20 overs)	v	Australia; 158/3 (17.3 overs)
Shakib Al Hasan 66 (52); Nathan Coulter-Nile 2/17 (3 overs)		Aaron Finch 71 (45); Al-Amin Hossain 2/30 (3.3 overs)

Australia won by 7 wickets
Sher-e-Bangla National Cricket Stadium, Dhaka
Umpires: Kumar Dharmasena (SL) and Marais Erasmus (SA)
Player of the match: Aaron Finch (Aus)

- Bangladesh won the toss and elected to bat.
- Taskin Ahmed (Bangladesh) made his Twenty20 International debut.

1 April
19:30 (D/N)
Scorecard

West Indies; 166/6 (20 overs)	v	Pakistan; 82 (17.5 overs)
Dwayne Bravo 46 (26); Mohammad Hafeez 1/15 (2 overs)		Mohammad Hafeez 19 (32); Samuel Badree 3/10 (4 overs)

West Indies won by 84 runs
Sher-e-Bangla National Cricket Stadium, Dhaka
Umpires: Ian Gould (Eng) and Richard Kettleborough (Eng)
Player of the match: Dwayne Bravo (WI)

- West Indies won the toss and elected to bat.
- Pakistan was eliminated, while West Indies qualified for the Semi-finals as a result of this match.

== Knockout stage ==
Semifinals
①1	Sri Lanka	160/6 (20 overs) (D/L)
②2	West Indies	80/4 (13.5 overs)
②1	India	176/4 (19.1 overs)
①2	South Africa	172/4 (20 overs)

Final
①1	Sri Lanka	134/4 (17.5 overs)
②1	India	130/4 (20 overs)

=== Semi-finals ===
3 April 2014
Scorecard

Sri Lanka; 160/6 (20 overs)	v	West Indies; 80/4 (13.5 overs)
Lahiru Thirimanne 44 (35); Krishmar Santokie 2/46 (4 overs)		Dwayne Bravo 30 (19); Lasith Malinga 2/5 (2 overs)

Sri Lanka won by 27 runs (D/L method)
Sher-e-Bangla National Cricket Stadium, Dhaka
Umpires: Richard Kettleborough (Eng) and Rod Tucker (Aus)
Player of the match: Angelo Mathews (SL)

- Sri Lanka won the toss and elected to bat.
- West Indies innings curtailed at 13.5 overs due to rain; DLS par score was 108.
- Sri Lanka qualified for their third World Twenty20 final after 2009 and 2012.

4 April 2014
Scorecard

South Africa; 172/4 (20 overs)	v	India; 176/4 (19.1 overs)
Faf du Plessis 58 (41); Ravichandran Ashwin 3/22 (4 overs)		Virat Kohli 72* (44); Beuran Hendricks 2/31 (4 overs)

India won by 6 wickets
Sher-e-Bangla National Cricket Stadium, Dhaka
Umpires: Kumar Dharmasena (SL) and Ian Gould (Eng)
Player of the match: Virat Kohli (Ind)

- South Africa won the toss and elected to bat.
- India qualified for their second World Twenty20 final after 2007.

=== Final ===
6 April 2014
19:00
Scorecard

India; 130/4 (20 overs)	v	Sri Lanka; 134/4 (17.5 overs)
Virat Kohli 77 (58); Rangana Herath 1/23 (4 overs)		Kumar Sangakkara 52* (35); Mohit Sharma 1/18 (2 overs)

Sri Lanka won by 6 wickets
Sher-e-Bangla National Cricket Stadium, Dhaka
Attendance : 26,000
Umpires: Ian Gould (Eng) and Richard Kettleborough (Eng)
Player of the match: Kumar Sangakkara (SL)

- Sri Lanka won the toss and elected to field.
- Kumar Sangakkara and Mahela Jayawardene (SL) played in their last T20I.
- Mahela Jayawardene (SL) became the first batsman to reach 1000 runs in ICC World Twenty20.

== Statistics ==
=== Most runs ===
Source: ESPNCricinfo

Player	Matches	Innings	Runs	Average	SR	HS	100	50	4s	6s
(India) Virat Kohli	6	6	319	106.33	129.14	77	-	4	24	10
(Netherlands) Tom Cooper	7	7	231	57.75	137.50	72*	0	1	22	10
(Netherlands) Stephan Myburgh	7	7	224	32.00	154.48	63	0	3	26	13
(India) Rohit Sharma	6	6	200	40.00	123.45	62*	0	2	19	6
(South Africa) JP Duminy	5	5	187	62.33	140.60	86*	0	1	14	8

=== Most wickets ===
Source: ESPNCricinfo

Player	Matches	Innings	Wickets	Econ.	Ave.	BBI	S/R	4WI	5WI
(South Africa) Imran Tahir	5	5	12	6.55	10.91	4/21	10.0	1	0
(Netherlands) Ahsan Malik	7	7	12	6.68	13.83	5/19	12.4	0	1
(Cricket West Indies) Samuel Badree	5	5	11	5.65	10.27	4/21	10.9	1	0
(India) Ravichandran Ashwin	6	6	11	5.35	11.27	4/11	12.6	1	0
(India) Amit Mishra	6	6	10	6.68	14.70	3/21	15.3	0	0

== Team of the tournament ==
Player	Role
(India) Rohit Sharma	Batsman
(Netherlands) Stephan Myburgh	Batsman
(India) Virat Kohli	Batsman
(South Africa) JP Duminy	All-rounder
(Australia) Glenn Maxwell	All-rounder
(India) MS Dhoni	Batsman / Wicket-keeper (Captain)
(Cricket West Indies) Darren Sammy	All-rounder
(India) Ravichandran Ashwin	Bowling all-rounder
(South Africa) Dale Steyn	Bowler
(Cricket West Indies) Samuel Badree	Bowler
(Sri Lanka) Lasith Malinga	Bowler
(Cricket West Indies) Krishmar Santokie	Bowler / 12th man

== Media ==
=== Logo ===
On 6 April 2013, ICC unveiled the logo of the tournament at a gala event in Dhaka. The overall look of the logo design is primarily inspired by the unique Bangladesh decoration art style. The logo uses the colours of the Bangladeshi flag with splashes of blue representing the country's rivers (also as being the ICC's own colour). The logo is also inspired by the rickshaws. The T is made up of cricket stumps and the '0' in the T20 represents the cricket ball complete with a green seam.

=== Theme song ===
Char Chokka Hoi Hoi (Bengali: চার ছক্কা হৈ হৈ; English: Fours, Sixes, Fun and Games) was the official theme song of the 2014 ICC World Twenty20. It was released worldwide on 20 February 2014. Most of the song is in Bengali while some phrases in the opening lines are in English. The song is composed by famous Bangladeshi composer and artist Fuad al Muqtadir and has been sung by an ensemble of young vocalists, namely Dilshad Nahar Kona, Elita Karim, Pantha Kanai, Johan Alamgir, Sanvir Huda, Badhon Sarkar Puja and Kaushik Hossain Taposh. The song is notable for its playful use of "Banglish".

The song received a mixed reaction in Bangladesh. It was widely criticized on the grounds that the lyrics and the subsequent music video in particular, did not adequately capture the essence of Bangladeshi culture and heritage. Despite this, the song became hugely popular in a short while due to its catchy tune and energetic beat. A competition held by the ICC, which invited university students from the three host cities (Dhaka, Chittagong and Sylhet) to create and submit their own dance videos, helped to further popularise the song. The competition gave rise to flashmobs and performances in a number of major cities in Bangladesh. Eventually, the trend continued in other cities and even spread abroad to New York City, London, China and Russia well after the deadline for the competition had passed. Due to its now-global appeal and signature dance moves, Char Chokka Hoi Hoi has been compared to other dance trends such as 'Gangnam Style' and 'Harlem Shake'.

=== Broadcasting ===
Country/Territory	TV	Radio	Internet
Afghanistan	Lemar TV	Salaam Wantadar	
Africa – sub-Sahara	SuperSport		www.supersport.com
Australia	Fox Sports; Nine Network (Australia matches & finals only)		foxsports.com.au
Brunei and Malaysia	Astro		
Bangladesh	Bangladesh Television; Maasranga TV; Gazi TV	Bangladesh Betar; Radio Bhumi	starsports.com
Canada	Sportsnet World, Sportsnet One (finals)		Sportsnet World Online
Caribbean, Central America, South America and United States	ESPN; ESPN2 (Finals)	CMC	ESPN3
Europe (excluding the United Kingdom and Ireland)	Eurosport		
India	STAR Sports; Doordarshan (India matches, Semifinals and Final)	All India Radio	starsports.com
Indian subcontinent	STAR Sports		starsports.com
Ireland and United Kingdom	Sky Sports	BBC	skysports.com
Hong Kong, Philippines, Papua New Guinea and Singapore	STAR Sports; Star Cricket		starsports.com
Middle East and North Africa	OSN Sports Cricket	89.1 Radio4	
Nepal	Nepal Television		
New Zealand	Sky TV	Radio Sport	
Norway	NRK		
Pacific Islands	Fiji TV		
Pakistan	PTV Home & Personal TV (Terrestrial); PTV Sports (Cable); TEN Sports (Cable and IP TV)	PBC; Hum FM; Hot FM (Pakistan matches)	starsports.com sports.ptv.com.pk
South Africa	SuperSport; SABC 3	SABC Radio 2000	www.supersport.com
Sri Lanka	CSN	Siyatha FM	www.csn.lk

== See also ==
- 2014 ICC Women's World Twenty20
