= Xander Pitchers =

Namibian cricketer (born 1994)

Personal information
- Full name: Russell Alexander Hugh Pitchers IV
- Born: 20 February 1994 (age 32); Kimberley, Cape Province, South Africa
- Batting: Right-handed
- Bowling: Right-arm off spin
- Role: Batsman

International information
- National side: Namibia (2012–2015)

Career statistics
Competition	FC	LA
Matches	26	16
Runs scored	1,047	284
Batting average	21.81	17.75
100s/50s	3/2	0/1
Top score	118	57
Balls bowled	530	12
Wickets	7	0
Bowling average	42.14	n/a
5 wickets in innings	0	0
10 wickets in match	0	n/a
Best bowling	1/10	0/8
Catches/stumpings	9/–	6/–
- Source: CricketArchive, 25 May 2015

Russell Alexander Hugh Pitchers (born 20 February 1994) is a Namibian cricketer who made his senior debut for the Namibian national side in March 2013, aged 19.

Born in Kimberley, South Africa, Pitchers attended the city's Hoërskool Noord-Kaap (Northern Cape High School), playing cricket for the school team. He played several seasons for underage Griqualand West teams, and made his debut for the Griqualand West under-19s in October 2010, at the age of 16. Pitchers, a right-handed batsman, later moved to Namibia, going on to qualify for the Namibian national under-19 side. He was named in the Namibian squad for the 2012 Under-19 World Cup, but played in only two warm-up matches, against the West Indies and Zimbabwe.

Pitchers' final matches for a South African domestic side came in December 2012, when he played in a third consecutive national under-19 championships for Griqualand West. In March 2013, he made his first-class debut for the Namibian senior side in the South African Three-Day Provincial Competition. On debut against KwaZulu-Natal, he opened the batting with Pikky Ya France, scoring a duck in the first innings and six runs in the second innings as Namibia lost by an innings and 114 runs within two days. In the following match, against South Western Districts, Pitchers scored a maiden first-class century, 114 runs from 228 balls.

For the Namibian under-19s, Pitchers was the leading runscorer at the 2013 Africa Under-19 Championship in Uganda, with 228 runs from three innings. Against Zambia, he was the top scorer with 161 from 143 balls, helping Namibia to a 244-run win. Namibia won the final against Kenya to qualify for the 2014 Under-19 World Cup in the United Arab Emirates. Pitchers made his under-19 One Day International (ODI) debut at the World Cup, and scored 131 runs from four matches, behind only Gerhard Erasmus for Namibia. His highest score came against Zimbabwe, 78 runs from 116 balls.

Outside of his under-19 appearances, Smit has become a regular for the Namibian senior side in both South African domestic tournaments and international competitions, featuring at the 2013 Intercontinental Cup, the 2013 WCL Championship, and the 2014 World Cup Qualifier. A second first-class century, 118 from 266 balls, came against KwaZulu-Natal Inland in the 2013–14 South African season. In May 2015, against Hong Kong in Namibia's first Intercontinental Cup fixture of the 2015–17 cycle, Pitchers scored a maiden international century in the second innings, 105* opening with Stephan Baard.
