= Manjula Guruge =

Emirati cricketer (born 1981)

Personal information
- Full name: Manjula Asanka Guruge
- Born: 14 February 1981 (age 45); Ambalangoda, Sri Lanka
- Batting: Right-handed
- Bowling: Left-arm fast-medium
- Role: Bowler

International information
- National side: United Arab Emirates
- ODI debut (cap 42): 1 February 2014 v Scotland
- Last ODI: 15 March 2015 v West Indies
- T20I debut (cap 4): 17 March 2014 v Netherlands
- Last T20I: 22 November 2015 v Oman

Career statistics
Competition	ODI	T20I
Matches	7	5
Runs scored	16	3
Batting average	–	3.00
100s/50s	0/0	0/0
Top score	10*	1*
Balls bowled	351	96
Wickets	12	5
Bowling average	28.08	25.00
5 wickets in innings	0	0
10 wickets in match	0	0
Best bowling	4/56	2/18
Catches/stumpings	1/–	1/–
- Source: Cricinfo, 8 October 2021

Manjula Guruge (born 14 February 1981) is a Sri Lankan-born cricketer who played for the United Arab Emirates national cricket team. He played for the United Arab Emirates in the 2014 Cricket World Cup Qualifier tournament.

He played his first One Day International (ODI) at Bert Sutcliffe Oval in the 2014 ICC Cricket World Cup Qualifier final against Scotland where he took 3/67 in a 41-run defeat. He was selected for 2014 ICC World Twenty20 in Bangladesh. He made his Twenty20 International (T20I) debut against Netherlands at Sylhet Stadium.
