= Nelson Odhiambo =

Kenyan cricketer (born 1989)

Personal information
- Full name: Nelson Mandela Odhiambo
- Born: 21 March 1989 (age 37); Nairobi, Kenya
- Batting: Right-handed
- Bowling: Right-arm medium-fast
- Role: Bowler
- Relatives: Thomas Odoyo (uncle)

International information
- National side: Kenya (2010–present)
- ODI debut (cap 40): 16 February 2010 v Netherlands
- Last ODI: 4 October 2013 v Afghanistan
- T20I debut (cap 29): 4 February 2010 v Scotland
- Last T20I: 12 July 2024 v Nigeria

Career statistics
| Competition | ODI | T20I | FC | LA |
|---|---|---|---|---|
| Matches | 8 | 64 | 7 | 46 |
| Runs scored | 56 | 538 | 117 | 510 |
| Batting average | 9.33 | 15.82 | 11.70 | 13.42 |
| 100s/50s | 0/0 | 0/2 | 0/0 | 0/1 |
| Top score | 29 | 67 | 35* | 54 |
| Balls bowled | 318 | 462 | 808 | 1,628 |
| Wickets | 8 | 22 | 12 | 55 |
| Bowling average | 32.00 | 28.72 | 38.00 | 24.92 |
| 5 wickets in innings | 0 | 0 | 0 | – |
| 10 wickets in match | 0 | 0 | 0 | – |
| Best bowling | 3/48 | 3/30 | 3/93 | 4/46 |
| Catches/stumpings | 1/0 | 6/0 | 2/– | 11/– |
- Source: Cricinfo, 4 May 2025

Nelson Odhiambo (born 21 March 1989) is a Kenyan cricketer. He played for Kenya in the 2014 Cricket World Cup Qualifier tournament.

In January 2018, he was named in Kenya's squad for the 2018 ICC World Cricket League Division Two tournament. In September 2018, he was named in Kenya's squad for the 2018 Africa T20 Cup. The following month, he was named in Kenya's squad for the 2018 ICC World Cricket League Division Three tournament in Oman. He was the leading run-scorer for Kenya in the tournament, with 158 runs in five matches.

In May 2019, he was named in Kenya's squad for the Regional Finals of the 2018–19 ICC T20 World Cup Africa Qualifier tournament in Uganda. In September 2019, he was named in Kenya's squad for the 2019 ICC T20 World Cup Qualifier tournament in the United Arab Emirates.
