= Raza-ur-Rehman =

Raza Ur Rehman
Personal information
- Full name: Raza Ur Rehman
- Born: 5 November 1985 (age 41); Bulawayo, Matabeleland, Zimbabwe
- Nickname: Raz
- Batting: Right-handed
- Bowling: Left-arm medium-fast
- Role: All-rounder

International information
- National side: Canada (2012–2014)
- ODI debut (cap 83): 11 March 2013 v Kenya
- Last ODI: 28 January 2014 v Netherlands
- T20I debut (cap 34): 13 March 2012 v Netherlands
- Last T20I: 26 November 2013 v Kenya

Career statistics
| Competition | ODI | T20I | FC | LA |
|---|---|---|---|---|
| Matches | 6 | 5 | 2 | 10 |
| Runs scored | 255 | 25 | 68 | 385 |
| Batting average | 45.00 | 6.25 | 22.66 | 48.12 |
| 100s/50s | 0/3 | 0/0 | 0/1 | 0/4 |
| Top score | 88 | 10 | 68 | 89 |
| Balls bowled | 122 | 54 | 195 | 218 |
| Wickets | 1 | 2 | 7 | 1 |
| Bowling average | 128.00 | 29.00 | 14.85 | 222.00 |
| 5 wickets in innings | 0 | 0 | 0 | 0 |
| 10 wickets in match | 0 | 0 | 0 | 0 |
| Best bowling | 1/59 | 2/16 | 4/8 | 1/59 |
| Catches/stumpings | 4/– | 2/– | 2/– | 6/– |
- Source: ESPNcricinfo, 28 April 2020

Raza Ur Rehman (born 5 November 1985) is an international cricketer who plays for the Canada national cricket team. Raza bats right-handed and bowls left-arm medium-fast.

== Career ==
Raza made his One Day International debut against Kenya on 11 May 2013. On debut he scored 70 runs from 83 balls. Raza played his maiden first-class match against Kenya on 28 March 2013.
