= Christi Viljoen =

Cricket player

Personal information
- Full name: Christoffel Viljoen
- Born: 28 September 1987 (age 39); Pretoria, Transvaal, South Africa
- Batting: Right-handed
- Bowling: Right-arm medium
- Role: All-rounder

International information
- National side: Namibia (2019)
- ODI debut (cap 24): 27 April 2019 v Oman
- Last ODI: 17 September 2019 v United States
- T20I debut (cap 11): 20 May 2019 v Ghana
- Last T20I: 2 November 2019 v Ireland

Domestic team information
- Years: Team
- 2015/16–2018/19: Otago

Career statistics
Competition	ODI	T20I	FC	LA
Matches	2	12	80	89
Runs scored	19	68	2,788	1,209
Batting average	19.00	17.00	22.12	21.21
100s/50s	0/0	0/0	1/12	0/6
Top score	17*	33	182*	87*
Balls bowled	30	223	12,313	3,882
Wickets	2	20	225	102
Bowling average	7.00	11.80	26.98	30.98
5 wickets in innings	0	1	8	1
10 wickets in match	0	0	0	0
Best bowling	2/6	5/9	7/61	5/27
Catches/stumpings	2/–	5/–	37/–	29/–
- Source: Cricinfo, 6 July 2020

Christoffel "Christi" Viljoen (born 28 September 1987) is a former cricketer who played for the Namibia national team. He played as a right-handed batsman who bowled right-arm medium-fast. He also played for Otago in New Zealand domestic cricket.

== Career ==
Viljoen made his first-class debut for Namibia in the CSA Provincial Three-Day Challenge competition held in South Africa on 21 January 2010 against KwaZulu-Natal. He also made his T20 debut (along with 9 other players in Namibia) against Zimbabwe on 13 February 2010. Opening the bowling with Louis Klazinga, Viljoen took a single wicket (that of Sikandar Raza) for seven runs. He played six matches in the tournament, scoring 61 runs from three innings with a highest of 41, and took six wickets at an average of 16.83.

After experimenting with a two-division format the International Cricket Council decided that the 2011–2013 ICC Intercontinental Cup would feature eight teams, including Namibia who were previously in the Shield competition, playing first-class cricket. Namibia played their opening fixture of the Cup in September. Batting at number three Viljoen scored a four-ball duck in the first innings but in the second managed 87 from 136 balls, in the process passing 500 first-class runs in his career and beating his previous highest score in the format.

A team made up of some of the leading players from Associate and Affiliate teams was put together to face England in Dubai in January 2012. The three-day match was part of England's preparation for a series against Pakistan later that month. Along with Craig Williams, Viljoen was one of two Namibia players included in the 12-man squad. Coming in to bat at 90/6, Viljoen top-scored with 98 runs from 189 balls against a bowling line-up including James Anderson, Stuart Broad, Steven Finn, and Graeme Swann.

The UAE hosted the 2012 World Twenty20 Qualifier in March. Namibia progressed to the preliminary finals where they lost to Ireland. With 14 wickets from 9 matches, Viljoen was Namibia's leading wicket-taker in the tournament (equal fourth overall), and scored 48 runs from 5 innings. Shortly after the tournament concluded, Namibia hosted Canada in the Intercontinental Cup. Namibia won by eight wickets and in the second innings Viljoen finished with career-best bowling figures of 7/61.

In January 2018, he was named in Namibia's squad for the 2018 ICC World Cricket League Division Two tournament.

He was the joint-leading wicket-taker for Otago in the 2018–19 Super Smash, with thirteen dismissals in seven matches.

In March 2019, he was named in Namibia's squad for the 2019 ICC World Cricket League Division Two tournament. Namibia finished in the top four places in the tournament, therefore gaining One Day International (ODI) status. Viljoen made his ODI debut for Namibia on 27 April 2019, against Oman, in the tournament's final.

In May 2019, he was named in Namibia's squad for the Regional Finals of the 2018–19 ICC T20 World Cup Africa Qualifier tournament in Uganda. He made his Twenty20 International (T20I) debut for Namibia against Ghana on 20 May 2019. In Namibia's third match of the tournament, against Botswana, Viljoen took his first five-wicket haul in a T20I match, finishing with figures of five wickets for nine runs from his four overs. He finished as the leading wicket-taker in the Regional Finals, with nine dismissals in three matches. However, following the conclusion of the tournament, the International Cricket Council (ICC) suspended Viljoen for four matches, after he breached the ICC's Anti-Racism Code during the match against Uganda.

In June 2019, he was one of twenty-five cricketers to be named in Cricket Namibia's Elite Men's Squad ahead of the 2019–20 international season. In September 2019, he was named in Namibia's squad for the 2019 ICC T20 World Cup Qualifier tournament in the United Arab Emirates. Ahead of the tournament, the International Cricket Council (ICC) named him as the player to watch in Namibia's squad.
