= Irfan Ahmed =

Hong Kong cricketer (born 1989)

Personal information
- Full name: Irfan Ahmed
- Born: 20 November 1989 (age 36); Multan, Punjab, Pakistan
- Batting: Right-handed
- Bowling: Right-arm fast-medium
- Role: All-rounder
- Relatives: Nadeem Ahmed (brother)

International information
- National side: Hong Kong
- ODI debut (cap 16): 24 June 2008 v Pakistan
- Last ODI: 4 May 2014 v UAE

Career statistics
| Competition | ODI | First-class |
|---|---|---|
| Matches | 6 | 2 |
| Runs scored | 99 | 24 |
| Batting average | 16.50 | 6.00 |
| 100s/50s | 0/0 | 0/0 |
| Top score | 37 | 13 |
| Balls bowled | 290 | 133 |
| Wickets | 8 | 3 |
| Bowling average | 37.37 | 31.66 |
| 5 wickets in innings | 0 | 0 |
| 10 wickets in match | 0 | 0 |
| Best bowling | 3/51 | 2/29 |
| Catches/stumpings | 2/– | 0/– |
- Source: Cricinfo, 2 February 2023

Irfan Ahmed (born 20 November 1989) is a Pakistani-born international cricketer who has played six One Day Internationals for Hong Kong. Playing as an all-rounder, he made his debut against Pakistan on 24 June 2008.

== Career ==
In January 2016, Ahmed was provisionally suspended by the International Cricket Council after a breach of their Anti-Corruption Code. In April the same year, the ICC suspended him for two years and six months, following his admission to the charge. In October 2018, he was charged with a further nine offences under the ICC Anti-Corruption Code, along with his brother and team-mate Nadeem Ahmed and Haseeb Amjad, another teammate, for match- or spot-fixing. In August 2019, the ICC banned him and Nadeem Ahmed for life from all forms of cricket. Haseeb was banned from all cricket for five years. The majority of the offences related to matches played by Hong Kong against Canada and Scotland during the 2014 Cricket World Cup Qualifier tournament in New Zealand.

== See also ==
- List of cricketers banned for corruption
