= Iain Wardlaw =

English cricketer

Personal information
- Full name: Iain Wardlaw
- Born: 29 June 1985 (age 41); Dewsbury, Yorkshire, England
- Height: 6 ft 2 in (1.88 m)
- Batting: Right-handed
- Bowling: Right-arm medium
- Role: Bowler
- Relatives: Helen Wardlaw (sister)

International information
- National side: Scotland (2013–2015)
- ODI debut (cap 50): 6 March 2013 v Afghanistan
- Last ODI: 14 March 2015 v Australia
- ODI shirt no.: 8
- T20I debut (cap 32): 3 March 2013 v Afghanistan
- Last T20I: 19 November 2013 v Kenya

Domestic team information
- Years: Team
- 2011–2013: Yorkshire

Career statistics
Competition	ODI	T20I	FC	LA
Matches	22	4	6	47
Runs scored	21	1	66	87
Batting average	3.50	1.00	16.50	6.69
100s/50s	0/0	0/0	0/0	0/0
Top score	7*	1	33*	18
Balls bowled	1,108	96	810	2,155
Wickets	36	9	8	72
Bowling average	28.77	16.11	70.00	29.73
5 wickets in innings	0	0	0	0
10 wickets in match	0	0	0	0
Best bowling	4/22	3/40	3/101	4/22
Catches/stumpings	1/–	0/–	2/–	5/–
- Source: CricketArchive, 28 August 2016

Iain Wardlaw (born 29 June 1985) is a retired English-born first-class cricketer who played international cricket for Scotland. A right-arm medium pacer and right-handed batsman, Wardlaw was contracted to Yorkshire County Cricket Club to the end of the 2012 season, and for whom he played four Twenty20 games, and one County Championship match in 2011.

Wardlaw joined Yorkshire in 2011, having played for Cleckheaton C.C. in the Bradford League. He has played for the Yorkshire Second XI in the Second XI Championship, as well as appearing in his debut Twenty20 match for Yorkshire against Nottinghamshire in July 2011, when he took two wickets for 17 runs off 3.1 overs. Wardlaw has since played three more Twenty20 matches for Yorkshire, although has yet to take another wicket, but his overall economy rate is 5.82 per over.

He made his first-class debut against Lancashire, in the Roses Match in July 2011, taking one wicket for 68 runs. Wardlaw was replaced in the Yorkshire side later in the match, when Tim Bresnan returned early from potential international duty.

In May 2015, Wardlaw announced that he would retire from international cricket to focus on a career in design.
