= Khurram Chohan =

Canadian cricketer (born 1980)

Personal information
- Born: 22 February 1980 (age 46); Lahore, Punjab, Pakistan
- Batting: Right-handed
- Bowling: Right-arm fast-medium

International information
- National side: Canada (2009–2014)
- ODI debut (cap 63): 6 April 2009 v Ireland
- Last ODI: 28 January 2014 v Netherlands
- T20I debut (cap 24): 3 February 2010 v Ireland
- Last T20I: 10 February 2010 v Kenya
- Source: Cricinfo, 29 April 2020

Khurram Chohan (born 22 February 1980) is a Pakistani-Canadian cricketer who represented the Canada national cricket team. Chohan had a career in Pakistan's domestic cricket league before he emigrated to Canada. He played for the Lahore cricket teams and also represented Pakistan at under-19 level.

Chohan was included in Canada's squad for the World Cup Qualifiers in South Africa in early 2009 and proved one of their more consistent bowlers, taking 15 wickets in the course of the tournament. He is mainly known for his fast-medium seamers. khuram has 4 kid’s shamaim khuram Hareem Khuram Hannan Khuram and Momina khuram are the names registered
