= Nadeem Ahmed =

Hong Kong cricketer (born 1987)

Personal information
- Full name: Nadeem Ahmed
- Born: 28 September 1987 (age 39); Multan, Punjab, Pakistan
- Batting: Right-handed
- Bowling: Slow left-arm orthodox
- Role: Bowler
- Relatives: Irfan Ahmed (brother)

International information
- National side: Hong Kong (2004–2018)
- ODI debut (cap 12): 18 July 2004 v Pakistan
- Last ODI: 18 September 2018 v India
- T20I debut (cap 7): 16 March 2014 v Nepal
- Last T20I: 18 January 2017 v Netherlands

Career statistics
| Competition | ODI | T20I | FC | LA |
|---|---|---|---|---|
| Matches | 25 | 24 | 7 | 45 |
| Runs scored | 67 | 34 | 94 | 163 |
| Batting average | 5.58 | 6.80 | 8.54 | 8.57 |
| 100s/50s | 0/0 | 0/0 | 0/0 | 0/0 |
| Top score | 14 | 10 | 29 | 24* |
| Balls bowled | 1,327 | 495 | 1,557 | 2,334 |
| Wickets | 38 | 25 | 31 | 63 |
| Bowling average | 24.52 | 21.84 | 24.25 | 26.33 |
| 5 wickets in innings | 0 | 0 | 1 | 0 |
| 10 wickets in match | 0 | 0 | 0 | 0 |
| Best bowling | 4/26 | 4/21 | 5/72 | 4/26 |
| Catches/stumpings | 12/– | 12/– | 1/– | 17/– |
- Source: ESPNcricinfo, 28 September 2021

Nadeem Ahmed (born 28 September 1987) is a Pakistani-born Hong Kong cricketer who appeared in one One Day International against Pakistan in 2004; he bowled 10 overs without taking a wicket and scored 1. He also appeared in two first-class matches in the 2005 ICC Intercontinental Cup, taking three wickets.

In December 2017, he finished as the joint-leading wicket-taker in the 2015–17 ICC World Cricket League Championship, with 24 wickets in 11 matches.

In August 2018, he was named in Hong Kong's squad for the 2018 Asia Cup Qualifier tournament. Hong Kong won the qualifier tournament, and he was then named in Hong Kong's squad for the 2018 Asia Cup.

In October 2018, he was charged with five offences under the ICC Anti-Corruption Code. In August 2019, the ICC banned him and his brother and fellow Hong Kong cricketer Irfan Ahmed for life from all forms of cricket, on charges related to match-fixing. The majority of the offences related to matches played by Hong Kong against Canada and Scotland during the 2014 Cricket World Cup Qualifier tournament in New Zealand.

== See also ==
- List of cricketers banned for corruption
