= Haseeb Amjad =

Hong Kong cricketer (born 1987)

Personal information
- Full name: Haseeb Amjad
- Born: 11 November 1987 (age 39); Rawalpindi, Pakistan
- Batting: Right-handed
- Bowling: Right-arm medium-fast
- Role: Bowler

International information
- National side: Hong Kong (2013–2018)
- ODI debut (cap 24): 1 May 2014 v Afghanistan
- Last ODI: 26 January 2016 v Scotland
- T20I debut (cap 5): 16 March 2014 v Nepal
- Last T20I: 12 March 2016 v Scotland

Career statistics
Competition	ODI	T20I	FC	LA
Matches	7	18	2	16
Runs scored	112	45	75	184
Batting average	22.40	11.25	18.75	20.44
100s/50s	0/0	0/0	0/0	0/0
Top score	42	12*	41	42
Balls bowled	342	368	368	828
Wickets	11	24	10	34
Bowling average	26.18	18.87	13.00	19.32
5 wickets in innings	0	0	1	0
10 wickets in match	0	0	0	0
Best bowling	3/49	4/16	5/49	4/33
Catches/stumpings	4/–	2/–	1/–	5/–
- Source: CricketArchive, 25 March 2016

Haseeb Amjad (born 11 November 1987) is a Hong Kong cricketer. He played for Hong Kong in the 2014 ICC World Twenty20 tournament. He made his One Day International (ODI) debut against Afghanistan in the 2014 ACC Premier League on 1 May 2014. Amjad played seven ODIs and 18 Twenty20 Internationals for the national side.

In October 2018, he was charged with five offences under the ICC Anti-Corruption Code. In August 2019, the ICC banned him for five years from all forms of cricket for spot fixing. The majority of the offences related to matches played by Hong Kong against Canada and Scotland during the 2014 Cricket World Cup Qualifier tournament in New Zealand.

== See also ==
- List of cricketers banned for corruption
