= Louis Klazinga =

Namibian cricketer (born 1985)

Personal information
- Born: 4 December 1985 (age 40); Pretoria, South Africa
- Batting: Right-handed
- Bowling: Right-arm fast-medium

Domestic team information
- Years: Team
- 2006/07–2015: Namibia

Career statistics
Competition	FC	LA	T20
Matches	73	94	40
Runs scored	1,123	456	142
Batting average	15.81	11.69	23.66
100s/50s	0/1	0/1	0/0
Top score	51	64	25*
Balls bowled	9,486	4,016	695
Wickets	226	148	39
Bowling average	24.07	24.01	21.61
5 wickets in innings	11	2	0
10 wickets in match	1	0	0
Best bowling	6/70	5/36	4/9
Catches/stumpings	45/–	24/–	17/–
- Source: CricketArchive, 27 January 2025

Louis Klazinga (born 4 December 1985) is a Namibian former cricketer.

After playing for Eldoraigne High School in Centurion, Gauteng, he first played for Namibia in October 2006 as a pace bowler and tail-end batsman, in the South African Airways Three-Day Challenge, making his debut against Limpopo. He took the wickets of Sammy Letsoalo, Jacques Pretorius and Sipho Mashele, but did not bat during the match, following captain Louis Burger's declaration after scoring a century. In his second match for Namibia, he took four wickets. Since then, he has been Namibia's regular opening bowler. After failing to qualify for the ICC World Twenty20 2016, at the age of 29, Klazinga announced his retirement from cricket, leaving a big hole in the weak and inexperienced Namibia Cricket Team.

He was named in the team of the tournament after the ICC Intercontinental Cup in 2007–08.
