= International cricket in 2015 =

International cricket season

The 2015 international cricket season was from May 2015 to September 2015.

== Season overview ==
Men's international tours
| Start date | Home team | Away team | Results [Matches] | | |
| Start date | Home team | Away team | Test | ODI | T20I |
|---|---|---|---|---|---|
| 8 May 2015 | Ireland | England | — | 0–0 [1] | — |
| 21 May 2015 | England | New Zealand | 1–1 [2] | 3–2 [5] | 1–0 [1] |
| 22 May 2015 | Pakistan | Zimbabwe | — | 2–0 [3] | 2–0 [2] |
| 3 June 2015 | West Indies | Australia | 0–2 [2] | — | — |
| 7 June 2015 | Bangladesh | India | 0–0 [1] | 2–1 [3] | — |
| 11 June 2015 | Sri Lanka | Pakistan | 1–2 [3] | 2–3 [5] | 0–2 [2] |
| 18 June 2015 | Ireland | Scotland | — | — | 0–2 [4] |
| 30 June 2015 | Netherlands | Nepal | — | — | 3–1 [4] |
| 5 July 2015 | Bangladesh | South Africa | 0–0 [2] | 2–1 [3] | 0–2 [2] |
| 8 July 2015 | England | Australia | 3–2 [5] | 2-3 [5] | 1–0 [1] |
| 10 July 2015 | Zimbabwe | India | — | 0–3 [3] | 1–1 [2] |
| 2 August 2015 | Zimbabwe | New Zealand | — | 1–2 [3] | 0–1 [1] |
| 12 August 2015 | Sri Lanka | India | 1–2 [3] | — | — |
| 14 August 2015 | South Africa | New Zealand | — | 2–1 [3] | 1–1 [2] |
| 27 August 2015 | Ireland | Australia | — | 0–1 [1] | — |
| 27 September 2015 | Zimbabwe | Pakistan | — | 1–2 [3] | 0–2 [2] |
Men's minor tours
| Start date | Home team | Away team | Results [Matches] | | |
| Start date | Home team | Away team | FC | LA | T20 |
| 10 May 2015 | Namibia | Hong Kong | 1–0 [1] | 1–1 [2] | 1–1 [2] |
| 2 June 2015 | Ireland | UAE | 1–0 [1] | — | — |
| 2 June 2015 | Scotland | Afghanistan | 0–0 [1] | — | — |
| 16 June 2015 | Netherlands | PNG | 0–1 [1] | 2–0 [2] | — |
| 25 June 2015 | Kenya | UAE | — | 1–1 [2] | — |
| 29 July 2015 | Scotland | Nepal | — | 2–0 [2] | — |
| 8 September 2015 | Netherlands | Scotland | 1–0 [1] | 0–0 [2] | — |
Women's tours
| Start date | Home team | Away team | Results [Matches] | | |
| Start date | Home team | Away team | WTest | WODI | WT20I |
| 13 May 2015 | Sri Lanka | West Indies | — | 1–3 [4] | 1–2 [3] |
| 28 June 2015 | India | New Zealand | — | 3–2 [5] | 1–2 [3] |
| 21 July 2015 | England | Australia | 0–1 [1] | 1–2 [3] | 2–1 [3] |
| 19 August 2015 | Ireland | Australia | — | — | 0–3 [3] |
| 30 September 2015 | Pakistan | Bangladesh | — | 2–0 [2] | 2–0 [2] |
Men's minor tournaments
| Start date | Tournament | | | Winners | |
| 3 May 2015 | (United States) 2015 ICC Americas Twenty20 Division One | | | Canada | |
| 9 May 2015 | (Jersey) 2015 ICC Europe Division One | | | Jersey | |
| 9 July 2015 | (Republic of Ireland) (Scotland) 2015 ICC World Twenty20 Qualifier | | | Scotland; Netherlands | |
| 14 July 2015 | (Papua New Guinea) 2015 Pacific Games – Men's | | | Vanuatu | |
| 7 September 2015 | (England) 2015 ICC World Cricket League Division Six | | | Suriname | |
Women's minor tournaments
| Start date | Tournament | | | Winners | |
| 6 July 2015 | (Papua New Guinea) 2015 Pacific Games – Women's | | | Samoa | |

== Rankings ==
The following are the rankings at the beginning of the season.

ICC Test Championship 12 May 2015
| Rank | Team | Matches | Points | Rating |
|---|---|---|---|---|
| 1 | South Africa | 21 | 2738 | 130 |
| 2 | Australia | 23 | 2492 | 108 |
| 3 | New Zealand | 26 | 2584 | 99 |
| 4 | India | 22 | 2183 | 99 |
| 5 | England | 27 | 2623 | 97 |
| 6 | Pakistan | 20 | 1935 | 97 |
| 7 | Sri Lanka | 21 | 2019 | 96 |
| 8 | West Indies | 23 | 1927 | 84 |
| 9 | Bangladesh | 18 | 704 | 39 |
| 10 | Zimbabwe | 10 | 53 | 5 |

ICC ODI Championship 1 May 2015
| Rank | Team | Matches | Points | Rating |
|---|---|---|---|---|
| 1 | Australia | 38 | 4889 | 129 |
| 2 | India | 45 | 5278 | 117 |
| 3 | New Zealand | 37 | 4284 | 116 |
| 4 | South Africa | 46 | 5131 | 112 |
| 5 | Sri Lanka | 55 | 5811 | 106 |
| 6 | England | 42 | 3968 | 98 |
| 7 | Bangladesh | 35 | 3094 | 96 |
| 8 | West Indies | 28 | 2471 | 88 |
| 9 | Pakistan | 43 | 3721 | 87 |
| 10 | Ireland | 11 | 549 | 50 |
| 11 | Zimbabwe | 28 | 1250 | 45 |
| 12 | Afghanistan | 15 | 618 | 41 |

ICC T20I Championship 1 May 2015
| Rank | Team | Matches | Points | Rating |
|---|---|---|---|---|
| 1 | Sri Lanka | 13 | 1760 | 135 |
| 2 | India | 10 | 1244 | 124 |
| 3 | Australia | 16 | 1953 | 122 |
| 4 | West Indies | 17 | 1994 | 117 |
| 5 | Pakistan | 18 | 2031 | 113 |
| 6 | New Zealand | 15 | 1656 | 110 |
| 7 | South Africa | 19 | 2084 | 110 |
| 8 | England | 15 | 1493 | 100 |
| 9 | Bangladesh | 8 | 612 | 77 |
| 10 | Afghanistan | 6 | 373 | 62 |
| 11 | Netherlands | 6 | 357 | 60 |
| 12 | Zimbabwe | 5 | 254 | 51 |
| 13 | Scotland | 4 | 176 | 44 |
Insufficient matches
| | Ireland | 4 | 334 | 84 |
| | Hong Kong | 3 | 90 | 63 |
| | Nepal | 3 | 63 | 30 |
| | UAE | 2 | 0 | 0 |

== May ==
=== 2015 ICC Americas Twenty20 Division One ===
==== Points table ====
2015 ICC Americas Twenty20 Division One
- Dates: 3 – 10 May 2015
- Administrator: ICC Americas
- Cricket format: 20-over
- Tournament format: Double round-robin
- Host: United States
- Champions: Canada (1st title)
- Participants: 4
- Matches: 12
- Player of the series: (United States) Fahad Babar
- Most runs: (United States) Fahad Babar (242)
- Most wickets: (United States) Timil Patel (15)

The 2015 ICC Americas Twenty20 Division One was a cricket tournament held in the United States from 3–10 May 2015. All matches were played at the World Sports Park in Indianapolis, Indiana.

The top two teams at the tournament, Canada and the United States, progressed to the 2015 World Twenty20 Qualifier in Ireland and Scotland, where the top six teams will qualify for the 2016 ICC World Twenty20 in India. The tournament was organised by ICC Americas, and featured the top four associate members in that region – Bermuda, Canada, Suriname, and the United States. The West Indies cricket team is a full member of the International Cricket Council (ICC), and thus qualifies directly for the World Twenty20.

== Teams and qualification ==
| Team | Mode of qualification |
|---|---|
| Canada | 12th place at 2013 World Twenty20 Qualifier |
| Bermuda | Champion of 2013 Division One; 14th place at 2013 World Twenty20 Qualifier |
| United States | Runner-up in 2013 Division One; 15th place at 2013 World Twenty20 Qualifier |
| Suriname | Champion of 2014 Division Two |

== Squads ==
| Bermuda Coach: Arnold Manders | Canada Coach: Mukesh Narula | Suriname Coaches: Kumar Rampat and Ravindra Seeram | United States Coach: Nasir Javed |
|---|---|---|---|
| Janeiro Tucker (c); OJ Pitcher (vc); ~~Jason Anderson*~~; Christian Burgess (wk); James Celestine; ~~Fiqre Crockwell~~; Jordan DeSilva; Joshua Gilbert; David Hemp; ~~Malachi Jones~~; Stefan Kelly; Tre Manders; Mishael Paynter* (wk); Justin Pitcher; Delray Rawlins; Jacobi Robinson*; Dion Stovell | Rizwan Cheema (c); Hamza Tariq (vc, wk); Khurram Chohan; Navneet Dhaliwal; Satsimranjit Dhindsa; Nikhil Dutta; Ruvindu Gunasekera; Jimmy Hansra; Nitish Kumar; Farhan Malik; Cecil Pervez; Junaid Siddiqui; Srimantha Wijeratne; Saad Bin Zafar | Mohindra Boodram (c); Kayamat Ally; Wasim Akram; Carlton Baker; Sauid Drepaul; Troy Dudnath; Arun Gokoel; Giovani Gokoel; Wasim Haslim; Khemraj Jaikaran (wk); Muneshwar Patandin; Shazam Ramjohn; Vishwar Shaw; Gavin Singh | Muhammad Ghous (c); Steven Taylor (vc, wk); Danial Ahmed; Barrington Bartley; Adil Bhatti; Akeem Dodson (wk); Fahad Babar; Karan Ganesh; Hammid Shahid; Jasdeep Singh; ~~Japen Patel~~; Mrunal Patel*; ~~Nisarg Patel~~; Timil Patel; Nicholas Standford |

- Japen Patel was initially named in the U.S. squad for the tournament, but withdrew in late April, and was replaced by Mrunal Patel.
- Fiqre Crockwell and Malachi Jones were initially named in Bermuda's squad for the tournament, but withdrew in late April (Jones due to injury and Crockwell for unnamed reasons), and were replaced by Jason Anderson and Jacobi Robinson. Anderson himself was withdrawn from the squad before the start of the tournament, and replaced by Mishael Paynter.
- Nisarg Patel was declared by the ICC to be ineligible to play in the tournament.

== Preparation ==
The Americas Twenty20 is the first international tournament to be held at the Indianapolis World Sports Park, with the two previous editions having been held at the Central Broward Regional Park in Lauderhill, Florida. Bermuda, coached by former national player Arnold Manders (assisted by a former teammate, Clay Smith), prepared for the tournament with a training camp in Jamaica. There, they played three matches against Jamaican club sides, winning all three. As part of its preparation for the tournament, Suriname played several Twenty20 matches against a touring Marylebone Cricket Club (MCC) side in March 2015. Canada played three warm-up matches against an invitational XI in Houston, Texas.

== Points table ==
| Pos | Team | Pld | W | L | Pts | NRR |
|---|---|---|---|---|---|---|
| 1 | Canada | 6 | 6 | 0 | 12 | 1.519 |
| 2 | United States | 6 | 4 | 2 | 8 | 0.679 |
| 3 | Bermuda | 6 | 1 | 5 | 2 | −0.262 |
| 4 | Suriname | 6 | 1 | 5 | 2 | −1.812 |

Source: ESPNcricinfo

== Fixtures ==
3 May
Scorecard

| Canada; 121/8 (20 overs) | v | Suriname; 59/9 (20 overs) |
| Rizwan Cheema 34 (31); Troy Dudnath 2/29 (4 overs) | | Wasim Akram 19 (35); Nikhil Dutta 4/8 (4 overs) |

Canada won by 62 runs
Indianapolis World Sports Park
Umpires: Sameer Bandekar (USA) and Ravishankar Byrappagowda (USA)
Player of the match: Nikhil Dutta (Can)

- Suriname won the toss and elected to field.

3 May
Scorecard

| Bermuda; 123/7 (20 overs) | v | United States; 125/5 (19 overs) |
| Christian Burgess 43 (31); Karan Ganesh 2/23 (4 overs) | | Fahad Babar 78* (54); Janeiro Tucker 2/22 (2 overs) |

United States won by 5 wickets
Indianapolis World Sports Park
Umpires: Harry Grewal (Can) and Courtney Young (Cay)
Player of the match: Fahad Babar (USA)

- Bermuda won the toss and elected to bat.

4 May
Scorecard

| Canada; 143/8 (20 overs) | v | Bermuda; 70/8 (13 overs) |
| Ruvindu Gunasekera 62 (54); Jacobi Robinson 3/13 (3 overs) | | Janeiro Tucker 20 (13); Cecil Pervez 2/5 (3 overs) |

Canada won by 38 runs (D/L)
Indianapolis World Sports Park
Umpires: Sameer Bandekar (USA) and Harry Grewal (Can)
Player of the match: Ruvindu Gunasekera (Can)

- Canada won the toss and elected to bat.
- Bermuda's target was set to 105 off 13 overs due to rain.

4 May
Scorecard

| Suriname; 106/8 (20 overs) | v | United States; 107/2 (13.5 overs) |
| Shazam Ramjohn 24 (30); Karan Ganesh 3/17 (4 overs) | | Nicholas Standford 64* (49); Carlton Baker 1/12 (2 overs) |

United States won by 8 wickets
Indianapolis World Sports Park
Umpires: Ravishankar Byrappagowda (USA) and Courtney Young (Cay)
Player of the match: Nicholas Standford (USA)

- Suriname won the toss and elected to bat.

5 May
Scorecard

| United States; 127/9 (20 overs) | v | Canada; 131/4 (18.4 overs) |
| Steven Taylor 46 (50); Cecil Pervez 3/9 (3 overs) | | Ruvindu Gunasekera 51 (48); Barrington Bartley 1/16 (2 overs) |

Canada won by 6 wickets
Indianapolis World Sports Park
Umpires: Sameer Bandekar (USA) and Courtney Young (Cay)
Player of the match: Cecil Pervez (Can)

- United States won the toss and elected to bat.

5 May
Scorecard

| Bermuda; 142/2 (20 overs) | v | Suriname; 55 (18.1 overs) |
| David Hemp 72* (57); Troy Dudnath 1/23 (3 overs) | | Gavin Singh 15 (21); Joshua Gilbert 2/4 (1.1 overs) |

Bermuda won by 87 runs
Indianapolis World Sports Park
Umpires: Ravishankar Byrappagowda (USA) and Harry Grewal (Can)
Player of the match: David Hemp (Ber)

- Bermuda won the toss and elected to bat.

7 May
10:00
Scorecard

| Bermuda; 97/5 (20 overs) | v | United States; 101/2 (12.1 overs) |
| OJ Pitcher 24† (37); Timil Patel 3/22 (4 overs) | | Steven Taylor 60 (39); Jacobi Robinson 1/27 (4 overs) |

United States won by 8 wickets
Indianapolis World Sports Park
Umpires: Harry Grewal (Can) and Courtney Young (Cay)
Player of the match: Steven Taylor (USA)

- Bermuda won the toss and elected to bat.

7 May
14:10
Scorecard

| Canada; 157/8 (20.0 overs) | v | Suriname; 133/6 (20.0 overs) |
| Rizwan Cheema 46 (35); Muneshwar Patandin 6/22 (4 overs) | | Muneshwar Patandin 36 (35); Saad Bin Zafar 2/17 (3 overs) |

Canada won by 24 runs
Indianapolis World Sports Park
Umpires: Sameer Bandekar (USA) and Ravishankar Byrappagowda (USA)
Player of the match: Muneshwar Patandin (Sur)

- Canada won the toss and elected to bat.
- Canada qualified for the World Twenty20 Qualifier as result of this match.

8 May
Scorecard

| Suriname; 106 (20 overs) | v | United States; 107/2 (18.2 overs) |
| Wasim Haslim 21 (17); Timil Patel 4/13 (4 overs) | | Fahad Babar 43* (46); Muneshwar Patandin 1/14 (2.2 overs) |

United States won by 8 wickets
Indianapolis World Sports Park
Umpires: Ravishankar Byrappagowda (USA) and Courtney Young (Cay)
Player of the match: Timil Patel (USA)

- United States won the toss and elected to field.
- United States qualified for the World Twenty20 Qualifier as result of this match.

8 May
Scorecard

| Bermuda; 114/7 (20 overs) | v | Canada; 118/3 (18.2 overs) |
| Janeiro Tucker 34 (46); Cecil Pervez 3/17 (4 overs) | | Jimmy Hansra 68* (59); Jordan DeSilva 1/11 (3 overs) |

Canada won by 7 wickets
Indianapolis World Sports Park
Umpires: Sameer Bandekar (USA) and Harry Grewal (Can)
Player of the match: Jimmy Hansra (Can)

- Bermuda won the toss and elected to bat.

9 May
Scorecard

| Bermuda; 99/7 (20 overs) | v | Suriname; 103/3 (19 overs) |
| David Hemp 28 (30); Wasim Haslim 3/15 (4 overs) | | Wasim Haslim 39 (46); Janeiro Tucker 2/21 (4 overs) |

Suriname won by 7 wickets
Indianapolis World Sports Park
Umpires: Ravishankar Byrappagowda (USA) and Harry Grewal (Can)
Player of the match: Wasim Haslim (Sur)

- Bermuda won the toss and elected to bat.

9 May
Scorecard

| Canada; 127/6 (20 overs) | v | United States; 104/8 (20 overs) |
| Ruvindu Gunasekera 54 (48); Timil Patel 3/20 (4 overs) | | Fahad Babar 33 (37); Jimmy Hansra 2/15 (4 overs) |

Canada won by 23 runs
Indianapolis World Sports Park
Umpires: Sameer Bandekar (USA) and Courtney Young (Cay)
Player of the match: Ruvindu Gunasekera (Can)

- United States won the toss and elected to field.

== Statistics ==
=== Most runs ===
The top five run scorers (total runs) are included in this table.

| Player | Team | Runs | Inns | Avg | S/R | Highest | 100s | 50s |
|---|---|---|---|---|---|---|---|---|
| Fahad Babar | United States | 242 | 6 | 121.00 | 110.00 | 78* | 0 | 1 |
| Ruvindu Gunasekera | Canada | 196 | 6 | 32.67 | 101.55 | 62 | 0 | 3 |
| Steven Taylor | United States | 167 | 6 | 27.83 | 109.15 | 60 | 0 | 1 |
| David Hemp | Bermuda | 156 | 6 | 31.20 | 92.86 | 72* | 0 | 1 |
| Jimmy Hansra | Canada | 143 | 6 | 35.75 | 104.38 | 68* | 0 | 1 |

Source: CricHQ

=== Most wickets ===
The top five wicket takers (total wickets) are listed in this table, ranked by wickets taken and then by bowling average.

| Player | Team | Overs | Wkts | Ave | SR | Econ | BBI |
|---|---|---|---|---|---|---|---|
| Timil Patel | United States | 24.0 | 15 | 7.67 | 9.60 | 4.79 | 4/13 |
| Nikhil Dutta | Canada | 23.0 | 12 | 9.42 | 11.50 | 4.91 | 4/8 |
| Muneshwar Patandin | Suriname | 19.2 | 10 | 10.60 | 11.60 | 5.48 | 6/22 |
| Cecil Pervez | Canada | 18.0 | 9 | 8.67 | 12.00 | 4.33 | 3/9 |
| Karan Ganesh | United States | 18.0 | 7 | 15.57 | 15.43 | 6.06 | 3/17 |

Source: CricHQ

== Final standing ==
| Position | Team | Status |
|---|---|---|
| 1 | Canada | Qualified for 2015 ICC World Twenty20 Qualifier |
| 2 | United States | Qualified for 2015 ICC World Twenty20 Qualifier |
| 3 | Bermuda | |
| 4 | Suriname | Relegated to ICC Americas Division Two |

Round Robin Matches
| No. | Date | Team 1 | Captain 1 | Team 2 | Captain 2 | Venue | Result |
|---|---|---|---|---|---|---|---|
| Match 1 | 3 May | Canada | Rizwan Cheema | Suriname | Mohindra Boodram | Indianapolis World Sports Park, Indianapolis | Canada by 62 runs |
| Match 2 | 3 May | USA | Muhammad Ghous | Bermuda | Janeiro Tucker | Indianapolis World Sports Park, Indianapolis | USA by 5 wickets |
| Match 3 | 4 May | Canada | Rizwan Cheema | Bermuda | Janeiro Tucker | Indianapolis World Sports Park, Indianapolis | Canada by 38 runs (DLS) |
| Match 4 | 4 May | USA | Muhammad Ghous | Suriname | Mohindra Boodram | Indianapolis World Sports Park, Indianapolis | USA by 8 wickets |
| Match 5 | 5 May | Canada | Rizwan Cheema | USA | Muhammad Ghous | Indianapolis World Sports Park, Indianapolis | Canada by 6 wickets |
| Match 6 | 5 May | Bermuda | Janeiro Tucker | Suriname | Mohindra Boodram | Indianapolis World Sports Park, Indianapolis | Bermuda by 87 runs |
| Match 7 | 7 May | USA | Muhammad Ghous | Bermuda | Janeiro Tucker | Indianapolis World Sports Park, Indianapolis | USA by 8 wickets |
| Match 8 | 7 May | Canada | Rizwan Cheema | Suriname | Mohindra Boodram | Indianapolis World Sports Park, Indianapolis | Canada by 24 runs |
| Match 9 | 8 May | USA | Muhammad Ghous | Suriname | Mohindra Boodram | Indianapolis World Sports Park, Indianapolis | USA by 8 wickets |
| Match 10 | 8 May | Canada | Rizwan Cheema | Bermuda | Janeiro Tucker | Indianapolis World Sports Park, Indianapolis | Canada by 7 wickets |
| Match 11 | 9 May | Bermuda | Janeiro Tucker | Suriname | Mohindra Boodram | Indianapolis World Sports Park, Indianapolis | Suriname by 7 wickets |
| Match 12 | 9 May | USA | Muhammad Ghous | Canada | Rizwan Cheema | Indianapolis World Sports Park, Indianapolis | Canada by 23 runs |

| Pos | Team | Status |
|---|---|---|
| 1 | Canada | Qualified for 2015 ICC World Twenty20 Qualifier |
| 2 | United States of America | Qualified for 2015 ICC World Twenty20 Qualifier |
| 3 | Bermuda | |
| 4 | Suriname | Relegated to ICC Americas Division Two |

ODI series
| No. | Date | Home captain | Away captain | Venue | Result |
|---|---|---|---|---|---|
| ODI 3650 | 8 May | William Porterfield | James Taylor | The Village, Dublin | No result |

| Pos | Team | Pld | W | L | T | NR | Pts | NRR |
|---|---|---|---|---|---|---|---|---|
| 1 | Jersey | 5 | 4 | 1 | 0 | 0 | 8 | 1.556 |
| 2 | Denmark | 5 | 4 | 1 | 0 | 0 | 8 | 0.779 |
| 3 | Italy | 5 | 3 | 2 | 0 | 0 | 6 | 1.502 |
| 4 | Guernsey | 5 | 3 | 2 | 0 | 0 | 6 | −0.040 |
| 5 | Norway | 5 | 1 | 4 | 0 | 0 | 2 | −2.599 |
| 6 | France | 5 | 0 | 5 | 0 | 0 | 0 | −1.090 |

Round Robin Matches
| No. | Date | Team 1 | Captain 1 | Team 2 | Captain 2 | Venue | Result |
|---|---|---|---|---|---|---|---|
| Match 1 | 9 May | Jersey | Peter Gough | Norway | Sufyan Saleem | Farmers Cricket Ground, Saint Martin | Jersey by 108 runs |
| Match 2 | 9 May | Denmark | Michael Pedersen | Guernsey | James Nussbaumer | Grainville Cricket Ground, Saint Savoir | Guernsey by 21 runs |
| Match 3 | 9 May | France | Arun Ayyavooraju | Italy | Damian Crowley | FB Playing Fields, Saint Clement | Italy by 6 wickets |
| Match 4 | 9 May | Jersey | Peter Gough | Italy | Damian Crowley | Farmers Cricket Ground, Saint Martin | Jersey by 4 wickets |
| Match 5 | 9 May | Guernsey | James Nussbaumer | Norway | Sufyan Saleem | Grainville Cricket Ground, Saint Savoir | Guernsey by 23 runs |
| Match 6 | 9 May | Denmark | Michael Pedersen | France | Arun Ayyavooraju | FB Playing Fields, Saint Clement | Denmark by 8 wickets |
| Match 7 | 11 May | Italy | Damian Crowley | Norway | Sufyan Saleem | Farmers Cricket Ground, Saint Martin | Italy by 140 runs |
| Match 8 | 11 May | Jersey | Peter Gough | Denmark | Michael Pedersen | Grainville Cricket Ground, Saint Savoir | Denmark by 7 wickets |
| Match 9 | 11 May | France | Arun Ayyavooraju | Guernsey | James Nussbaumer | FB Playing Fields, Saint Clement | Guernsey by 5 wickets |
| Match 10 | 11 May | Guernsey | James Nussbaumer | Italy | Damian Crowley | Farmers Cricket Ground, Saint Martin | Italy by 5 wickets |
| Match 11 | 11 May | Jersey | Peter Gough | France | Arun Ayyavooraju | Grainville Cricket Ground, Saint Savoir | Jersey by 19 runs |
| Match 12 | 11 May | Denmark | Michael Pedersen | Norway | Sufyan Saleem | FB Playing Fields, Saint Clement | Denmark by 3 wickets |
| Match 13 | 13 May | Jersey | Peter Gough | Guernsey | James Nussbaumer | Farmers Cricket Ground, Saint Martin | Jersey by 4 wickets |
| Match 14 | 13 May | Denmark | Michael Pedersen | Italy | Damian Crowley | Grainville Cricket Ground, Saint Savoir | Denmark by 16 runs |
| Match 15 | 13 May | France | Arun Ayyavooraju | Norway | Sufyan Saleem | FB Playing Fields, Saint Clement | Norway by 15 runs |
2015 ICC World Cricket League Division Six Qualifier
| No. | Date | Team 1 | Captain 1 | Team 2 | Captain 2 | Venue | Result |
| [ Only Match] | 15 May | France | Arun Ayyavooraju | Norway | Sufyan Saleem | FB Playing Fields, Saint Clement | Norway by 97 runs |

| Pos | Team | Status |
|---|---|---|
| 1 | Jersey | Qualified for 2015 ICC World Twenty20 Qualifier |
| 2 | Denmark | |
| 3 | Italy | |
| 4 | Guernsey | |
| 5 | Norway | |
| 6 | France | |

2015–17 ICC Intercontinental Cup - FC series
| No. | Date | Home captain | Away captain | Venue | Result |
|---|---|---|---|---|---|
| First-class | 10–13 May | Nicolaas Scholtz | James Atkinson | Wanderers Cricket Ground, Windhoek | Namibia by 114 runs |
2015–17 ICC World Cricket League Championship - LA series
| No. | Date | Home captain | Away captain | Venue | Result |
| List A | 15 May | Nicolaas Scholtz | James Atkinson | Wanderers Cricket Ground, Windhoek | Namibia by 1 wicket |
| List A | 17 May | Nicolaas Scholtz | James Atkinson | Wanderers Cricket Ground, Windhoek | Hong Kong by 8 wickets |
T20 series
| No. | Date | Home captain | Away captain | Venue | Result |
| T20 | 18 May | Nicolaas Scholtz | Tanwir Afzal | Wanderers Cricket Ground, Windhoek | Hong Kong by 59 runs |
| T20 | 19 May | Nicolaas Scholtz | Tanwir Afzal | Wanderers Cricket Ground, Windhoek | Namibia by 2 runs |

2014–16 ICC Women's Championship - WODI series
| No. | Date | Home captain | Away captain | Venue | Result |
|---|---|---|---|---|---|
| WODI 945 | 13 May | Prasadani Weerakkody | Merissa Aguilleira | R Premadasa Stadium, Colombo | West Indies by 5 wickets |
| WODI 946 | 15 May | Prasadani Weerakkody | Merissa Aguilleira | R Premadasa Stadium, Colombo | Sri Lanka by 6 wickets |
| WODI 947 | 18 May | Chamari Athapaththu | Merissa Aguilleira | R Premadasa Stadium, Colombo | West Indies by 18 runs (DLS) |
| WODI 948 | 20 May | Chamari Athapaththu | Merissa Aguilleira | R Premadasa Stadium, Colombo | West Indies by 31 runs |
WT20I series
| No. | Date | Home captain | Away captain | Venue | Result |
| WT20I 304 | 23 May | Chamari Athapaththu | Merissa Aguilleira | R Premadasa Stadium, Colombo | Sri Lanka by 5 runs (DLS) |
| WT20I 305 | 25 May | Chamari Athapaththu | Merissa Aguilleira | R Premadasa Stadium, Colombo | West Indies by 8 wickets |
| WT20I 306 | 26 May | Chamari Athapaththu | Merissa Aguilleira | R Premadasa Stadium, Colombo | West Indies by 9 wickets |

Test series
| No. | Date | Home captain | Away captain | Venue | Result |
|---|---|---|---|---|---|
| Test 2162 | 21–25 May | Alastair Cook | Brendon McCullum | Lord's, London | England by 124 runs |
| Test 2163 | 29 May–2 June | Alastair Cook | Brendon McCullum | Headingley, Leeds | New Zealand by 199 runs |
ODI series
| No. | Date | Home captain | Away captain | Venue | Result |
| ODI 3654 | 9 June | Eoin Morgan | Brendon McCullum | Edgbaston, Birmingham | England by 210 runs |
| ODI 3655 | 12 June | Eoin Morgan | Brendon McCullum | The Oval, London | New Zealand by 13 runs (DLS) |
| ODI 3656 | 14 June | Eoin Morgan | Brendon McCullum | Rose Bowl, Southampton | New Zealand by 3 wickets |
| ODI 3657 | 17 June | Eoin Morgan | Brendon McCullum | Trent Bridge, Nottingham | England by 7 wickets |
| ODI 3659 | 20 June | Eoin Morgan | Brendon McCullum | Riverside Ground, Chester-le-Street | England by 3 wickets (DLS) |
T20I series
| No. | Date | Home captain | Away captain | Venue | Result |
| T20I 423 | 23 June | Eoin Morgan | Brendon McCullum | Old Trafford, Manchester | England by 56 runs |

T20I series
| No. | Date | Home captain | Away captain | Venue | Result |
|---|---|---|---|---|---|
| T20I 417 | 22 May | Shahid Afridi | Elton Chigumbura | Gaddafi Stadium, Lahore | Pakistan by 5 wickets |
| T20I 418 | 24 May | Shahid Afridi | Elton Chigumbura | Gaddafi Stadium, Lahore | Pakistan by 2 wickets |
ODI series
| No. | Date | Home captain | Away captain | Venue | Result |
| ODI 3651 | 26 May | Azhar Ali | Elton Chigumbura | Gaddafi Stadium, Lahore | Pakistan by 41 runs |
| ODI 3652 | 29 May | Azhar Ali | Hamilton Masakadza | Gaddafi Stadium, Lahore | Pakistan by 6 wickets |
| ODI 3653 | 31 May | Azhar Ali | Hamilton Masakadza | Gaddafi Stadium, Lahore | No result |

== June ==
=== United Arab Emirates in Ireland ===
2015–17 ICC Intercontinental Cup - FC series
| No. | Date | Home captain | Away captain | Venue | Result |
|---|---|---|---|---|---|
| First-class | 2–5 June | William Porterfield | Mohammad Tauqir | Malahide Cricket Club Ground, Malahide | Ireland by an innings and 26 runs |

=== Afghanistan in Scotland ===
2015–17 ICC Intercontinental Cup - FC series
| No. | Date | Home captain | Away captain | Venue | Result |
|---|---|---|---|---|---|
| First-class | 2–5 June | Preston Mommsen | Asghar Stanikzai | New Williamfield, Stirling | Match drawn |

=== Australia in West Indies ===
2015 Frank Worrell Trophy - Test series
| No. | Date | Home captain | Away captain | Venue | Result |
|---|---|---|---|---|---|
| Test 2164 | 3−5 June | Denesh Ramdin | Michael Clarke | Windsor Park, Roseau, Dominica | Australia by 9 wickets |
| Test 2166 | 11−15 June | Denesh Ramdin | Michael Clarke | Sabina Park, Kingston, Jamaica | Australia by 227 runs |

=== India in Bangladesh ===
Test series
| No. | Date | Home captain | Away captain | Venue | Result |
|---|---|---|---|---|---|
| Test 2165 | 10–14 June | Mushfiqur Rahim | Virat Kohli | Fatullah Osmani Stadium, Fatullah | Match drawn |
ODI series
| No. | Date | Home captain | Away captain | Venue | Result |
| ODI 3658 | 18 June | Mashrafe Mortaza | MS Dhoni | Sher-e-Bangla National Cricket Stadium, Dhaka | Bangladesh by 79 runs |
| ODI 3660 | 21 June | Mashrafe Mortaza | MS Dhoni | Sher-e-Bangla National Cricket Stadium, Dhaka | Bangladesh by 6 wickets (DLS) |
| ODI 3661 | 24 June | Mashrafe Mortaza | MS Dhoni | Sher-e-Bangla National Cricket Stadium, Dhaka | India by 77 runs |

=== Papua New Guinea in Netherlands ===
2015–17 ICC Intercontinental Cup - FC series
| No. | Date | Home captain | Away captain | Venue | Result |
|---|---|---|---|---|---|
| First-class | 16–19 June | Peter Borren | Jack Vare | VRA Cricket Ground, Amstelveen | Papua New Guinea by 5 wickets |
2015–17 ICC World Cricket League Championship - LA series
| No. | Date | Home captain | Away captain | Venue | Result |
| List A | 22 June | Peter Borren | Jack Vare | Hazelaarweg Stadion, Rotterdam | Netherlands by 5 wickets (DLS) |
| List A | 24 June | Peter Borren | Jack Vare | VRA Cricket Ground, Amstelveen | Netherlands by 85 runs |

=== Pakistan in Sri Lanka ===
Test series
| No. | Date | Home captain | Away captain | Venue | Result |
|---|---|---|---|---|---|
| Test 2167 | 17–21 June | Angelo Mathews | Misbah-ul-Haq | Galle International Stadium, Galle | Pakistan by 10 wickets |
| Test 2168 | 25–29 June | Angelo Mathews | Misbah-ul-Haq | Paikiasothy Saravanamuttu Stadium, Colombo | Sri Lanka by 7 wickets |
| Test 2169 | 3–7 July | Angelo Mathews | Misbah-ul-Haq | Pallekele International Cricket Stadium, Kandy | Pakistan by 7 wickets |
ODI series
| No. | Date | Home captain | Away captain | Venue | Result |
| ODI 3664 | 11 July | Angelo Mathews | Azhar Ali | Rangiri Dambulla International Stadium, Dambulla | Pakistan by 6 wickets |
| ODI 3669 | 15 July | Angelo Mathews | Azhar Ali | Pallekele International Cricket Stadium, Kandy | Sri Lanka by 2 wickets |
| ODI 3670 | 19 July | Angelo Mathews | Azhar Ali | R Premadasa Stadium, Colombo | Pakistan by 135 runs |
| ODI 3671 | 22 July | Angelo Mathews | Azhar Ali | R Premadasa Stadium, Colombo | Pakistan by 7 wickets |
| ODI 3672 | 26 July | Angelo Mathews | Azhar Ali | Mahinda Rajapaksa International Cricket Stadium, Hambantota | Sri Lanka by 165 runs |
T20I series
| No. | Date | Home captain | Away captain | Venue | Result |
| T20I 448 | 30 July | Lasith Malinga | Shahid Afridi | R Premadasa Stadium, Colombo | Pakistan by 29 runs |
| T20I 449 | 1 August | Lasith Malinga | Shahid Afridi | R Premadasa Stadium, Colombo | Pakistan by 1 wicket |

=== Scotland in Ireland ===
T20I series
| No. | Date | Home captain | Away captain | Venue | Result |
|---|---|---|---|---|---|
| T20I 419 | 18 June | Kevin O'Brien | Preston Mommsen | Bready Cricket Club Ground, Magheramason | Scotland by 6 wickets |
| T20I 420 | 19 June | Kevin O'Brien | Preston Mommsen | Bready Cricket Club Ground, Magheramason | No result |
| T20I 421 | 20 June | Kevin O'Brien | Preston Mommsen | Bready Cricket Club Ground, Magheramason | Scotland by 6 wickets |
| T20I 422 | 21 June | Kevin O'Brien | Preston Mommsen | Bready Cricket Club Ground, Magheramason | No result |

=== United Arab Emirates vs. Kenya in England ===
2015–17 ICC World Cricket League Championship - LA series
| No. | Date | Home captain | Away captain | Venue | Result |
|---|---|---|---|---|---|
| List A | 25 June | Mohammad Tauqir | Rakep Patel | Rose Bowl, Southampton | United Arab Emirates by 5 wickets |
| List A | 27 June | Mohammad Tauqir | Rakep Patel | Rose Bowl, Southampton | Kenya by 65 runs |

=== New Zealand Women in India ===
2014–16 ICC Women's Championship - WODI series
| No. | Date | Home captain | Away captain | Venue | Result |
|---|---|---|---|---|---|
| WODI 949 | 28 June | Mithali Raj | Suzie Bates | M. Chinnaswamy Stadium, Bangalore | India by 17 runs |
| WODI 950 | 1 July | Mithali Raj | Suzie Bates | M. Chinnaswamy Stadium, Bangalore | New Zealand by 3 wickets |
| WODI 951 | 3 July | Mithali Raj | Suzie Bates | M. Chinnaswamy Stadium, Bangalore | New Zealand by 6 wickets |
| WODI 952 | 6 July | Mithali Raj | Suzie Bates | M. Chinnaswamy Stadium, Bangalore | India by 8 wickets |
| WODI 953 | 8 July | Mithali Raj | Suzie Bates | M. Chinnaswamy Stadium, Bangalore | India by 9 wickets |
WT20I series
| No. | Date | Home captain | Away captain | Venue | Result |
| WT20I 307 | 11 July | Mithali Raj | Suzie Bates | M. Chinnaswamy Stadium, Bangalore | New Zealand by 8 wickets |
| WT20I 308 | 13 July | Mithali Raj | Suzie Bates | M. Chinnaswamy Stadium, Bangalore | New Zealand by 6 wickets |
| WT20I 309 | 15 July | Mithali Raj | Suzie Bates | M. Chinnaswamy Stadium, Bangalore | India by 3 wickets |

=== Nepal in Netherlands ===
T20I series
| No. | Date | Home captain | Away captain | Venue | Result |
|---|---|---|---|---|---|
| T20I 424 | 30 June | Peter Borren | Paras Khadka | VRA Cricket Ground, Amstelveen | Netherlands by 18 runs |
| T20I 425 | 1 July | Peter Borren | Paras Khadka | VRA Cricket Ground, Amstelveen | Netherlands by 103 runs |
| T20I 426 | 2 July | Peter Borren | Paras Khadka | Hazelaarweg Stadion, Rotterdam | Netherlands by 18 runs |
| T20I 427 | 3 July | Peter Borren | Paras Khadka | Hazelaarweg Stadion, Rotterdam | Nepal by 3 wickets |

== July ==
=== South Africa in Bangladesh ===
T20I series
| No. | Date | Home captain | Away captain | Venue | Result |
|---|---|---|---|---|---|
| T20I 428 | 5 July | Mashrafe Mortaza | Faf du Plessis | Sher-e-Bangla National Cricket Stadium, Dhaka | South Africa by 52 runs |
| T20I 429 | 7 July | Mashrafe Mortaza | Faf du Plessis | Sher-e-Bangla National Cricket Stadium, Dhaka | South Africa by 31 runs |
ODI series
| No. | Date | Home captain | Away captain | Venue | Result |
| ODI 3663 | 10 July | Mashrafe Mortaza | Hashim Amla | Sher-e-Bangla National Cricket Stadium, Dhaka | South Africa by 8 wickets |
| ODI 3666 | 12 July | Mashrafe Mortaza | Hashim Amla | Sher-e-Bangla National Cricket Stadium, Dhaka | Bangladesh by 7 wickets |
| ODI 3668 | 15 July | Mashrafe Mortaza | Hashim Amla | Zohur Ahmed Chowdhury Stadium, Chittagong | Bangladesh by 9 wickets (DLS) |
Test series
| No. | Date | Home captain | Away captain | Venue | Result |
| Test 2172 | 21–25 July | Mushfiqur Rahim | Hashim Amla | Zohur Ahmed Chowdhury Stadium, Chittagong | Match drawn |
| Test 2174 | 30 July–3 August | Mushfiqur Rahim | Hashim Amla | Sher-e-Bangla National Cricket Stadium, Dhaka | Match drawn |

=== 2015 Pacific Games – Women's ===
==== Points table ====
| Pos | Team | Pld | W | L | T | NR | Pts | NRR |
|---|---|---|---|---|---|---|---|---|
| 1 | Papua New Guinea | 5 | 5 | 0 | 0 | 0 | 15 | 4.100 |
| 2 | Samoa | 5 | 4 | 1 | 0 | 0 | 12 | 4.019 |
| 3 | Vanuatu | 5 | 3 | 2 | 0 | 0 | 9 | −0.020 |
| 4 | Fiji | 5 | 2 | 3 | 0 | 0 | 6 | −0.169 |
| 5 | Cook Islands | 5 | 1 | 4 | 0 | 0 | 3 | −2.227 |
| 6 | New Caledonia | 5 | 0 | 5 | 0 | 0 | 0 | −5.176 |

Group stage
| No. | Date | Team 1 | Captain 1 | Team 2 | Captain 2 | Venue | Result |

=== Australia in England ===
2015 Ashes - Test series
| No. | Date | Home captain | Away captain | Venue | Result |
|---|---|---|---|---|---|
| Test 2170 | 8–12 July | Alastair Cook | Michael Clarke | Sophia Gardens, Cardiff | England by 169 runs |
| Test 2171 | 16–20 July | Alastair Cook | Michael Clarke | Lord's, London | Australia by 405 runs |
| Test 2173 | 29 July–2 August | Alastair Cook | Michael Clarke | Edgbaston, Birmingham | England by 8 wickets |
| Test 2175 | 6–10 August | Alastair Cook | Michael Clarke | Trent Bridge, Nottingham | England by an innings and 78 runs |
| Test 2178 | 20–24 August | Alastair Cook | Michael Clarke | The Oval, London | Australia by an innings and 46 runs |
T20I series
| No. | Date | Home captain | Away captain | Venue | Result |
| T20I 453 | 31 August | Eoin Morgan | Steve Smith | Sophia Gardens, Cardiff | England by 5 runs |
ODI series
| No. | Date | Home captain | Away captain | Venue | Result |
| ODI 3680 | 3 September | Eoin Morgan | Steve Smith | Rose Bowl, Southampton | Australia by 59 runs |
| ODI 3681 | 5 September | Eoin Morgan | Steve Smith | Lord's, London | Australia by 64 runs |
| ODI 3682 | 8 September | Eoin Morgan | Steve Smith | Old Trafford, Manchester | England by 93 runs |
| ODI 3683 | 11 September | Eoin Morgan | Steve Smith | Headingley, Leeds | England by 3 wickets |
| ODI 3684 | 13 September | Eoin Morgan | Steve Smith | Old Trafford, Manchester | Australia by 8 wickets |

=== 2015 ICC World Twenty20 Qualifier ===
| Pos | Team | Pld | W | L | T | NR | Pts | NRR |
|---|---|---|---|---|---|---|---|---|
| 1 | Ireland | 6 | 4 | 2 | 0 | 0 | 8 | 1.356 |
| 2 | Hong Kong | 6 | 3 | 2 | 0 | 1 | 7 | 0.614 |
| 3 | Namibia | 6 | 3 | 2 | 0 | 1 | 7 | 0.314 |
| 4 | Papua New Guinea | 6 | 3 | 2 | 0 | 1 | 7 | 0.113 |
| 5 | United States | 6 | 3 | 3 | 0 | 0 | 6 | −0.321 |
| 6 | Jersey | 6 | 2 | 4 | 0 | 0 | 4 | −0.523 |
| 7 | Nepal | 6 | 1 | 4 | 0 | 1 | 3 | −1.499 |

Advanced to 2016 World Twenty20 and Semifinal 2.
Advanced to Playoffs.

| Pos | Team | Pld | W | L | T | NR | Pts | NRR |
|---|---|---|---|---|---|---|---|---|
| 1 | Scotland | 6 | 4 | 2 | 0 | 0 | 8 | 1.205 |
| 2 | Netherlands | 6 | 4 | 2 | 0 | 0 | 8 | 1.151 |
| 3 | Afghanistan | 6 | 3 | 1 | 0 | 2 | 8 | 0.690 |
| 4 | Oman | 6 | 3 | 2 | 0 | 1 | 7 | 0.374 |
| 5 | Kenya | 6 | 3 | 2 | 0 | 1 | 7 | −0.645 |
| 6 | United Arab Emirates | 6 | 1 | 4 | 0 | 1 | 3 | −1.688 |
| 7 | Canada | 6 | 0 | 5 | 0 | 1 | 1 | −1.295 |

Advanced to 2016 World Twenty20 and Semifinal 1.
Advanced to Playoffs.

Group matches
| No. | Date | Team 1 | Captain 1 | Team 2 | Captain 2 | Venue | Result |
|---|---|---|---|---|---|---|---|
| T20I 430 | 9 July | Scotland | Preston Mommsen | UAE | Mohammad Tauqir | Grange Cricket Club Ground, Edinburgh | Scotland by 9 wickets |
| T20I 431 | 9 July | Netherlands | Peter Borren | Afghanistan | Asghar Stanikzai | Grange Cricket Club Ground, Edinburgh | Afghanistan by 32 runs |
| T20 | 10 July | Ireland | William Porterfield | Namibia | Nicolaas Scholtz | Stormont, Belfast | Ireland by 7 wickets |
| T20 | 10 July | Canada | Rizwan Cheema | Kenya | Rakep Patel | Myreside Cricket Ground, Edinburgh | Kenya by 7 wickets |
| T20 | 10 July | Nepal | Paras Khadka | USA | Muhammad Ghous | Stormont, Belfast | Nepal by 6 wickets |
| T20I 432 | 10 July | UAE | Mohammad Tauqir | Afghanistan | Asghar Stanikzai | Grange Cricket Club Ground, Edinburgh | Afghanistan by 8 wickets |
| T20 | 11 July | Hong Kong | Tanwir Afzal | Jersey | Peter Gough | Bready Cricket Club Ground, Magheramason | Jersey by 9 wickets |
| T20I 433 | 11 July | Scotland | Preston Mommsen | Netherlands | Peter Borren | Grange Cricket Club Ground, Edinburgh | Netherlands by 32 runs |
| T20 | 11 July | Kenya | Rakep Patel | Oman | Sultan Ahmed | Myreside Cricket Ground, Edinburgh | Kenya by 7 runs |
| T20 | 11 July | Namibia | Nicolaas Scholtz | Nepal | Paras Khadka | Stormont, Belfast | No result |
| T20 | 12 July | Ireland | William Porterfield | USA | Muhammad Ghous | Stormont, Belfast | Ireland by 46 runs |
| T20 | 12 July | Jersey | Peter Gough | PNG | Jack Vare | Bready Cricket Club Ground, Magheramason | PNG by 24 runs |
| T20I 434 | 12 July | UAE | Mohammad Tauqir | Netherlands | Peter Borren | Grange Cricket Club Ground, Edinburgh | Netherlands by 7 wickets |
| T20 | 12 July | Canada | Rizwan Cheema | Oman | Sultan Ahmed | New Williamfield, Stirling | Oman by 7 wickets (DLS) |
| T20I 435 | 12 July | Scotland | Preston Mommsen | Afghanistan | Asghar Stanikzai | Grange Cricket Club Ground, Edinburgh | Afghanistan by 37 runs |
| T20 | 13 July | Namibia | Nicolaas Scholtz | USA | Muhammad Ghous | Stormont, Belfast | Namibia by 7 wickets |
| T20I 435a | 13 July | Hong Kong | Tanwir Afzal | PNG | Jack Vare | Bready Cricket Club Ground, Magheramason | Match abandoned |
| T20I 436 | 13 July | Ireland | William Porterfield | Nepal | Paras Khadka | Stormont, Belfast | Ireland by 8 wickets |
| T20 | 13 July | Afghanistan | Asghar Stanikzai | Kenya | Rakep Patel | New Williamfield, Stirling | Match abandoned |
| T20 | 14 July | Netherlands | Peter Borren | Oman | Sultan Ahmed | Myreside Cricket Ground, Edinburgh | Oman by 6 wickets |
| T20 | 14 July | UAE | Mohammad Tauqir | Canada | Rizwan Cheema | New Williamfield, Stirling | UAE by 5 wickets |
| T20 | 14 July | Scotland | Preston Mommsen | Kenya | Rakep Patel | Grange Cricket Club Ground, Edinburgh | Scotland by 7 wickets |
| T20I 437 | 15 July | Ireland | William Porterfield | PNG | Jack Vare | Stormont, Belfast | PNG by 2 wickets |
| T20 | 15 July | USA | Muhammad Ghous | Jersey | Peter Gough | Bready Cricket Club Ground, Magheramason | USA by 5 wickets |
| T20 | 15 July | Afghanistan | Asghar Stanikzai | Oman | Sultan Ahmed | Goldenacre, Edinburgh | Oman by 40 runs |
| T20I 438 | 15 July | Nepal | Paras Khadka | Hong Kong | Tanwir Afzal | Stormont, Belfast | Hong Kong by 5 wickets |
| T20 | 15 July | UAE | Mohammad Tauqir | Kenya | Rakep Patel | Goldenacre Sports Ground, Edinburgh | Kenya by 42 runs |
| T20 | 16 July | Scotland | Preston Mommsen | Canada | Rizwan Cheema | Goldenacre Sports Ground, Edinburgh | Scotland by 8 wickets |
| T20I 439 | 17 July | Nepal | Paras Khadka | PNG | Jack Vare | Malahide Cricket Club Ground, Malahide | PNG by 8 wickets |
| T20 | 17 July | Namibia | Nicolaas Scholtz | Jersey | Peter Gough | Clontarf Cricket Club Ground, Dublin | Namibia by 9 wickets |
| T20 | 17 July | Netherlands | Peter Borren | Canada | Rizwan Cheema | Goldenacre Sports Ground, Edinburgh | Netherlands by 6 wickets |
| T20 | 17 July | UAE | Mohammad Tauqir | Oman | Sultan Ahmed | New Williamfield, Stirling | Match abandoned |
| T20I 441 | 17 July | Ireland | William Porterfield | Hong Kong | Tanwir Afzal | Malahide Cricket Club Ground, Malahide | Hong Kong by 5 runs |
| T20 | 18 July | Nepal | Paras Khadka | Jersey | Peter Gough | Malahide Cricket Club Ground, Malahide | Jersey by 7 wickets |
| T20 | 18 July | Scotland | Preston Mommsen | Oman | Sultan Ahmed | Goldenacre Sports Ground, Edinburgh | Scotland by 23 runs |
| T20 | 18 July | Afghanistan | Asghar Stanikzai | Canada | Rizwan Cheema | New Williamfield, Stirling | Match abandoned |
| T20 | 18 July | PNG | Jack Vare | Namibia | Nicolaas Scholtz | Malahide Cricket Club Ground, Malahide | Namibia by 49 runs |
| T20 | 18 July | Hong Kong | Tanwir Afzal | USA | Muhammad Ghous | Clontarf Cricket Club Ground, Dublin | USA by 7 wickets |
| T20 | 18 July | Netherlands | Peter Borren | Kenya | Rakep Patel | Myreside Cricket Ground, Edinburgh | Netherlands by 4 wickets |
| T20 | 19 July | Ireland | William Porterfield | Jersey | Peter Gough | Malahide Cricket Club Ground, Malahide | Ireland by 7 wickets |
| T20 | 19 July | PNG | Jack Vare | USA | Muhammad Ghous | Malahide Cricket Club Ground, Malahide | USA by 18 runs |
| T20 | 19 July | Hong Kong | Tanwir Afzal | Namibia | Nicolaas Scholtz | Clontarf Cricket Club Ground, Dublin | Hong Kong by 83 runs |
Playoffs
| No. | Date | Team 1 | Captain 1 | Team 2 | Captain 2 | Venue | Result |
| T20I 443 | 21 July | Hong Kong | Tanwir Afzal | Afghanistan | Asghar Stanikzai | Malahide Cricket Club Ground, Malahide | Hong Kong by 5 wickets |
| T20 | 21 July | Namibia | Nicolaas Scholtz | Netherlands | Peter Borren | Malahide Cricket Club Ground, Malahide | Netherlands by 4 wickets |
| T20I 444 | 23 July | PNG | Jack Vare | Afghanistan | Asghar Stanikzai | Malahide Cricket Club Ground, Malahide | Afghanistan by 6 wickets |
| T20 | 23 July | Oman | Sultan Ahmed | Namibia | Nicolaas Scholtz | Malahide Cricket Club Ground, Malahide | Oman by 5 wickets |
| T20I 445 | 25 July | Scotland | Preston Mommsen | Hong Kong | Tanwir Afzal | Malahide Cricket Club Ground, Malahide | Scotland by 5 wickets |
| T20I 446 | 25 July | Afghanistan | Asghar Stanikzai | Oman | Sultan Ahmed | Clontarf Cricket Club Ground, Dublin | Afghanistan by 5 wickets |
| T20I 447 | 25 July | Ireland | William Porterfield | Netherlands | Peter Borren | Malahide Cricket Club Ground, Malahide | Netherlands by 5 wickets |
| T20I 447a | 26 July | Hong Kong | Tanwir Afzal | Ireland | William Porterfield | Malahide Cricket Club Ground, Malahide | Match abandoned |
Final
| No. | Date | Team 1 | Captain 1 | Team 2 | Captain 2 | Venue | Result |
| T20I 447b | 26 July | Scotland | Preston Mommsen | Netherlands | Peter Borren | Malahide Cricket Club Ground, Malahide | Match abandoned |

==== Final Placings ====
| Pos | Team | Status |
|---|---|---|
| 1st | Scotland | Qualified for the 2016 ICC World Twenty20 and 2019 ICC T20 World Cup Qualifier. |
| 1st | Netherlands | Qualified for the 2016 ICC World Twenty20 and 2019 ICC T20 World Cup Qualifier. |
| 3rd | Ireland | Qualified for the 2016 ICC World Twenty20 and 2019 ICC T20 World Cup Qualifier. |
| 4th | Hong Kong | Qualified for the 2016 ICC World Twenty20 and 2019 ICC T20 World Cup Qualifier. |
| 5th | Afghanistan | Qualified for the 2016 ICC World Twenty20 and 2019 ICC T20 World Cup Qualifier. |
| 6th | Oman | Qualified for the 2016 ICC World Twenty20 and 2019 ICC T20 World Cup Qualifier. |
| 7th | Namibia | |
| 8th | Papua New Guinea | |
| 9th | Kenya | |
| 10th | United States of America | |
| 11th | Jersey | |
| 12th | Nepal | |
| 13th | United Arab Emirates | |
| 14th | Canada | |

=== India in Zimbabwe ===
ODI series
| No. | Date | Home captain | Away captain | Venue | Result |
|---|---|---|---|---|---|
| ODI 3662 | 10 July | Elton Chigumbura | Ajinkya Rahane | Harare Sports Club, Harare | India by 4 runs |
| ODI 3665 | 12 July | Elton Chigumbura | Ajinkya Rahane | Harare Sports Club, Harare | India by 62 runs |
| ODI 3667 | 14 July | Elton Chigumbura | Ajinkya Rahane | Harare Sports Club, Harare | India by 83 runs |
T20I series
| No. | Date | Home captain | Away captain | Venue | Result |
| T20I 440 | 17 July | Elton Chigumbura | Ajinkya Rahane | Harare Sports Club, Harare | India by 54 runs |
| T20I 442 | 19 July | Sikandar Raza | Ajinkya Rahane | Harare Sports Club, Harare | Zimbabwe by 10 runs |

=== Australia Women in England ===
2014–16 ICC Women's Championship - WODI series
| No. | Date | Home captain | Away captain | Venue | Result |
|---|---|---|---|---|---|
| WODI 954 | 21 July | Charlotte Edwards | Meg Lanning | County Ground, Taunton | England by 4 wickets |
| WODI 955 | 23 July | Charlotte Edwards | Meg Lanning | Bristol County Ground, Bristol | Australia by 63 runs |
| WODI 956 | 27 July | Charlotte Edwards | Meg Lanning | New Road, Worcester | Australia by 89 runs |
Women's Test series
| No. | Date | Home captain | Away captain | Venue | Result |
| WTest 138 | 11–14 August | Charlotte Edwards | Meg Lanning | St Lawrence Ground, Canterbury | Australia by 161 runs |
WT20I series
| No. | Date | Home captain | Away captain | Venue | Result |
| WT20I 313 | 26 August | Charlotte Edwards | Meg Lanning | County Cricket Ground, Chelmsford | England by 7 wickets |
| WT20I 314 | 28 August | Charlotte Edwards | Meg Lanning | County Cricket Ground, Hove | Australia by 20 runs |
| WT20I 315 | 31 August | Charlotte Edwards | Meg Lanning | Sophia Gardens, Cardiff | England by 5 wickets |

=== Nepal in Scotland ===
2015–17 ICC World Cricket League Championship - LA series
| No. | Date | Home captain | Away captain | Venue | Result |
|---|---|---|---|---|---|
| List A | 29 July | Preston Mommsen | Paras Khadka | Cambusdoon New Ground, Ayr | Scotland by 3 runs |
| List A | 31 July–1 August | Preston Mommsen | Paras Khadka | Cambusdoon New Ground, Ayr | Scotland by 9 wickets (DLS) |

== August ==
=== New Zealand in Zimbabwe ===
ODI series
| No. | Date | Home captain | Away captain | Venue | Result |
|---|---|---|---|---|---|
| ODI 3673 | 2 August | Elton Chigumbura | Kane Williamson | Harare Sports Club, Harare | Zimbabwe by 7 wickets |
| ODI 3674 | 4 August | Elton Chigumbura | Kane Williamson | Harare Sports Club, Harare | New Zealand by 10 wickets |
| ODI 3675 | 7 August | Elton Chigumbura | Kane Williamson | Harare Sports Club, Harare | New Zealand by 38 runs |
T20I series
| No. | Date | Home captain | Away captain | Venue | Result |
| T20I 450 | 9 August | Elton Chigumbura | Kane Williamson | Harare Sports Club, Harare | New Zealand by 80 runs |

=== India in Sri Lanka ===
Test series
| No. | Date | Home captain | Away captain | Venue | Result |
|---|---|---|---|---|---|
| Test 2176 | 12–16 August | Angelo Mathews | Virat Kohli | Galle International Stadium, Galle | Sri Lanka by 63 runs |
| Test 2177 | 20–24 August | Angelo Mathews | Virat Kohli | Paikiasothy Saravanamuttu Stadium, Colombo | India by 278 runs |
| Test 2179 | 28 August–1 September | Angelo Mathews | Virat Kohli | Sinhalese Sports Club Ground, Colombo | India by 117 runs |

=== New Zealand in South Africa ===
T20I series
| No. | Date | Home captain | Away captain | Venue | Result |
|---|---|---|---|---|---|
| T20I 451 | 14 August | AB de Villiers | Kane Williamson | Kingsmead Cricket Ground, Durban | South Africa by 6 wickets |
| T20I 452 | 16 August | AB de Villiers | Kane Williamson | Centurion Park, Centurion | New Zealand by 32 runs |
ODI series
| No. | Date | Home captain | Away captain | Venue | Result |
| ODI 3676 | 19 August | AB de Villiers | Kane Williamson | Centurion Park, Centurion | South Africa by 20 runs |
| ODI 3677 | 23 August | AB de Villiers | Kane Williamson | Senwes Park, Potchefstroom | New Zealand by 8 wickets |
| ODI 3678 | 26 August | AB de Villiers | Kane Williamson | Kingsmead Cricket Ground, Durban | South Africa by 62 runs |

=== Australia Women in Ireland ===
WT20I series
| No. | Date | Home captain | Away captain | Venue | Result |
|---|---|---|---|---|---|
| WT20I 310 | 19 August | Isobel Joyce | Meg Lanning | Claremont Road Cricket Ground, Dublin | Australia by 25 runs |
| WT20I 311 | 21 August | Isobel Joyce | Meg Lanning | Claremont Road Cricket Ground, Dublin | Australia by 55 runs |
| WT20I 312 | 22 August | Isobel Joyce | Meg Lanning | Claremont Road Cricket Ground, Dublin | Australia by 99 runs |

=== Australia in Ireland ===
ODI series
| No. | Date | Home captain | Away captain | Venue | Result |
|---|---|---|---|---|---|
| ODI 3679 | 27 August | William Porterfield | Steve Smith | Stormont, Belfast | Australia by 23 runs (DLS) |

== September ==
=== 2015 ICC World Cricket League Division Six ===
| Team | Pld | W | L | T | NR | Pts | NRR |
|---|---|---|---|---|---|---|---|
| Guernsey | 3 | 3 | 0 | 0 | 0 | 6 | +2.553 |
| Suriname | 3 | 2 | 1 | 0 | 0 | 4 | –0.041 |
| Botswana | 3 | 1 | 2 | 0 | 0 | 2 | –1.224 |
| Fiji | 3 | 0 | 3 | 0 | 0 | 0 | –1.340 |

| Team | Pld | W | L | T | NR | Pts | NRR |
|---|---|---|---|---|---|---|---|
| Vanuatu | 2 | 2 | 0 | 0 | 0 | 4 | +0.667 |
| Norway | 2 | 1 | 1 | 0 | 0 | 2 | –0.140 |
| Cayman Islands | 2 | 0 | 2 | 0 | 0 | 0 | –0.598 |
| Saudi Arabia | 0 | 0 | 0 | 0 | 0 | 0 | 0 |

Group stage
| No. | Date | Team 1 | Captain 1 | Team 2 | Captain 2 | Venue | Result |
|---|---|---|---|---|---|---|---|
| Match 1 | 7 September | Botswana | Karabo Motlhanka | Suriname | Mohindra Boodram | Kelvedon | Suriname by 5 wickets |
| Match 2 | 7 September | Guernsey | Jamie Nussbaumer | Fiji | Josefa Rika | Castle Park Cricket Ground, Colchester | Guernsey by 188 runs |
| Match 3 | 7 September | Cayman Islands | Chris Palmer | Vanuatu | Andrew Mansale | Frinton-on-Sea | Vanuatu by 4 wickets |
| Match 4 | 7 September | Norway | Raza Iqbal | Saudi Arabia | Shoaib Ali | Coggeshall | Match cancelled |
| Match 5 | 8 September | Cayman Islands | Chris Palmer | Saudi Arabia | Shoaib Ali | Kelvedon | Match cancelled |
| Match 6 | 8 September | Vanuatu | Andrew Mansale | Norway | Raza Iqbal | West Mersea | Vanuatu by 4 wickets |
| Match 7 | 8 September | Fiji | Josefa Rika | Suriname | Mohindra Boodram | Castle Park Cricket Ground, Colchester | Suriname by 6 wickets |
| Match 8 | 8 September | Guernsey | Jamie Nussbaumer | Botswana | Karabo Motlhanka | Frinton-on-Sea | Guernsey by 151 runs |
| Match 9 | 10 September | Fiji | Josefa Rika | Botswana | Karabo Motlhanka | Coggeshall | Botswana by 2 wickets |
| Match 10 | 10 September | Guernsey | Jamie Nussbaumer | Suriname | Mohindra Boodram | Halstead | Guernsey by 44 runs |
| Match 11 | 10 September | Cayman Islands | Chris Palmer | Norway | Raza Iqbal | Kelvedon | Norway by 8 runs |
| Match 12 | 10 September | Vanuatu | Andrew Mansale | Saudi Arabia | Shoaib Ali | Castle Park Cricket Ground, Colchester | Match cancelled |
Playoffs
| Match 13 | 11 September | Botswana | Karabo Motlhanka | Saudi Arabia | Shoaib Ali | Feering, Essex | Match cancelled |
| Match 14 | 11 September | Cayman Islands | Chris Palmer | Fiji | Josefa Rika | Maldon, Essex | Fiji by 90 runs |
| Match 15 | 11 September | Guernsey | Jamie Nussbaumer | Norway | Raza Iqbal | Frinton-on-Sea, Essex | Guernsey by 22 runs |
| Match 16 | 11 September | Vanuatu | Andrew Mansale | Suriname | Mohindra Boodram | Coggeshall, Essex | Suriname by 4 wickets |
| Match 17 | 13 September | Cayman Islands | Chris Palmer | Saudi Arabia | Shoaib Ali | Bishop's Stortford, Hertfordshire | Match cancelled |
| Match 18 | 13 September | Fiji | Josefa Rika | Botswana | Karabo Motlhanka | Bishop's Stortford, Hertfordshire | Fiji by 133 runs |
| Match 19 | 13 September | Vanuatu | Andrew Mansale | Norway | Raza Iqbal | Castle Park Cricket Ground, Colchester, Essex | Vanuatu by 91 runs (DLS) |
| Match 20 | 13 September | Guernsey | Jamie Nussbaumer | Suriname | Mohindra Boodram | County Ground, Chelmsford, Essex | Suriname by 6 wickets |

==== Final Placings ====
| Pos | Team | Status |
|---|---|---|
| 1 | Suriname (Note: Suriname withdrew from Division Five and Vanuatu was invited to replace them.) | Promoted to 2016 ICC World Cricket League Division Five |
| 2 | Guernsey | Promoted to 2016 ICC World Cricket League Division Five |
| 3 | Vanuatu (Note: Invited to Division Five) | |
| 4 | Norway | |
| 5 | Fiji | |
| 6 | Botswana | |
| 7 | Cayman Islands | |
| 8 | Saudi Arabia | |

=== Scotland in Netherlands ===
2015–17 ICC Intercontinental Cup - FC series
| No. | Date | Home captain | Away captain | Venue | Result |
|---|---|---|---|---|---|
| First-class | 8–11 September | Peter Borren | Preston Mommsen | Sportpark Westvliet, Voorburg | Netherlands by 44 runs |
2015–17 ICC World Cricket League Championship - LA series
| No. | Date | Home captain | Away captain | Venue | Result |
| List A | 14 September | Peter Borren | Preston Mommsen | VRA Cricket Ground, Amstelveen | No result |
| List A | 16 September | Peter Borren | Preston Mommsen | VRA Cricket Ground, Amstelveen | Match abandoned |

=== Pakistan in Zimbabwe ===
T20I series
| No. | Date | Home captain | Away captain | Venue | Result |
|---|---|---|---|---|---|
| T20I 454 | 27 September | Elton Chigumbura | Shahid Afridi | Harare Sports Club, Harare | Pakistan by 13 runs |
| T20I 455 | 29 September | Elton Chigumbura | Shahid Afridi | Harare Sports Club, Harare | Pakistan by 15 runs |
ODI series
| No. | Date | Home captain | Away captain | Venue | Result |
| ODI 3685 | 1 October | Elton Chigumbura | Azhar Ali | Harare Sports Club, Harare | Pakistan by 131 runs |
| ODI 3686 | 3 October | Elton Chigumbura | Azhar Ali | Harare Sports Club, Harare | Zimbabwe by 5 runs (DLS) |
| ODI 3687 | 5 October | Elton Chigumbura | Sarfaraz Ahmed | Harare Sports Club, Harare | Pakistan by 7 wickets |

=== Bangladesh Women in Pakistan ===
WT20I series
| No. | Date | Home captain | Away captain | Venue | Result |
|---|---|---|---|---|---|
| WT20I 316 | 30 September | Sana Mir | Salma Khatun | Southend Club Cricket Stadium, Karachi | Pakistan by 29 runs |
| WT20I 317 | 1 October | Sana Mir | Salma Khatun | Southend Club Cricket Stadium, Karachi | Pakistan by 34 runs |
WODI series
| No. | Date | Home captain | Away captain | Venue | Result |
| WODI 957 | 4 October | Sana Mir | Salma Khatun | Southend Club Cricket Stadium, Karachi | Pakistan by 20 runs |
| WODI 958 | 6 October | Sana Mir | Salma Khatun | Southend Club Cricket Stadium, Karachi | Pakistan by 6 wickets |
