= 2015 Americas Twenty20 Division One =

2015 ICC Americas Twenty20 Division One
- Dates: 3 – 10 May 2015
- Administrator: ICC Americas
- Cricket format: 20-over
- Tournament format: Double round-robin
- Host: United States
- Champions: Canada (1st title)
- Participants: 4
- Matches: 12
- Player of the series: (United States) Fahad Babar
- Most runs: (United States) Fahad Babar (242)
- Most wickets: (United States) Timil Patel (15)

The 2015 ICC Americas Twenty20 Division One was a cricket tournament held in the United States from 3–10 May 2015. All matches were played at the World Sports Park in Indianapolis, Indiana.

The top two teams at the tournament, Canada and the United States, progressed to the 2015 World Twenty20 Qualifier in Ireland and Scotland, where the top six teams will qualify for the 2016 ICC World Twenty20 in India. The tournament was organised by ICC Americas, and featured the top four associate members in that region – Bermuda, Canada, Suriname, and the United States. The West Indies cricket team is a full member of the International Cricket Council (ICC), and thus qualifies directly for the World Twenty20.

== Teams and qualification ==
Team	Mode of qualification
Canada	12th place at 2013 World Twenty20 Qualifier
Bermuda	Champion of 2013 Division One; 14th place at 2013 World Twenty20 Qualifier
United States	Runner-up in 2013 Division One; 15th place at 2013 World Twenty20 Qualifier
Suriname	Champion of 2014 Division Two

== Squads ==
Bermuda Coach: Arnold Manders	Canada Coach: Mukesh Narula	Suriname Coaches: Kumar Rampat and Ravindra Seeram	United States Coach: Nasir Javed
Janeiro Tucker (c); OJ Pitcher (vc); ~~Jason Anderson*~~; Christian Burgess (wk); James Celestine; ~~Fiqre Crockwell~~; Jordan DeSilva; Joshua Gilbert; David Hemp; ~~Malachi Jones~~; Stefan Kelly; Tre Manders; Mishael Paynter* (wk); Justin Pitcher; Delray Rawlins; Jacobi Robinson*; Dion Stovell	Rizwan Cheema (c); Hamza Tariq (vc, wk); Khurram Chohan; Navneet Dhaliwal; Satsimranjit Dhindsa; Nikhil Dutta; Ruvindu Gunasekera; Jimmy Hansra; Nitish Kumar; Farhan Malik; Cecil Pervez; Junaid Siddiqui; Srimantha Wijeratne; Saad Bin Zafar	Mohindra Boodram (c); Kayamat Ally; Wasim Akram; Carlton Baker; Sauid Drepaul; Troy Dudnath; Arun Gokoel; Giovani Gokoel; Wasim Haslim; Khemraj Jaikaran (wk); Muneshwar Patandin; Shazam Ramjohn; Vishwar Shaw; Gavin Singh	Muhammad Ghous (c); Steven Taylor (vc, wk); Danial Ahmed; Barrington Bartley; Adil Bhatti; Akeem Dodson (wk); Fahad Babar; Karan Ganesh; Hammid Shahid; Jasdeep Singh; ~~Japen Patel~~; Mrunal Patel*; ~~Nisarg Patel~~; Timil Patel; Nicholas Standford

- Japen Patel was initially named in the U.S. squad for the tournament, but withdrew in late April, and was replaced by Mrunal Patel.
- Fiqre Crockwell and Malachi Jones were initially named in Bermuda's squad for the tournament, but withdrew in late April (Jones due to injury and Crockwell for unnamed reasons), and were replaced by Jason Anderson and Jacobi Robinson. Anderson himself was withdrawn from the squad before the start of the tournament, and replaced by Mishael Paynter.
- Nisarg Patel was declared by the ICC to be ineligible to play in the tournament.

== Preparation ==
The Americas Twenty20 is the first international tournament to be held at the Indianapolis World Sports Park, with the two previous editions having been held at the Central Broward Regional Park in Lauderhill, Florida. Bermuda, coached by former national player Arnold Manders (assisted by a former teammate, Clay Smith), prepared for the tournament with a training camp in Jamaica. There, they played three matches against Jamaican club sides, winning all three. As part of its preparation for the tournament, Suriname played several Twenty20 matches against a touring Marylebone Cricket Club (MCC) side in March 2015. Canada played three warm-up matches against an invitational XI in Houston, Texas.

== Points table ==
Pos	Team	Pld	W	L	Pts	NRR
1	Canada	6	6	0	12	1.519
2	United States	6	4	2	8	0.679
3	Bermuda	6	1	5	2	−0.262
4	Suriname	6	1	5	2	−1.812

Source: ESPNcricinfo

== Fixtures ==
3 May
Scorecard

Canada; 121/8 (20 overs)	v	Suriname; 59/9 (20 overs)
Rizwan Cheema 34 (31); Troy Dudnath 2/29 (4 overs)		Wasim Akram 19 (35); Nikhil Dutta 4/8 (4 overs)

Canada won by 62 runs
Indianapolis World Sports Park
Umpires: Sameer Bandekar (USA) and Ravishankar Byrappagowda (USA)
Player of the match: Nikhil Dutta (Can)

- Suriname won the toss and elected to field.

3 May
Scorecard

Bermuda; 123/7 (20 overs)	v	United States; 125/5 (19 overs)
Christian Burgess 43 (31); Karan Ganesh 2/23 (4 overs)		Fahad Babar 78* (54); Janeiro Tucker 2/22 (2 overs)

United States won by 5 wickets
Indianapolis World Sports Park
Umpires: Harry Grewal (Can) and Courtney Young (Cay)
Player of the match: Fahad Babar (USA)

- Bermuda won the toss and elected to bat.

4 May
Scorecard

Canada; 143/8 (20 overs)	v	Bermuda; 70/8 (13 overs)
Ruvindu Gunasekera 62 (54); Jacobi Robinson 3/13 (3 overs)		Janeiro Tucker 20 (13); Cecil Pervez 2/5 (3 overs)

Canada won by 38 runs (D/L)
Indianapolis World Sports Park
Umpires: Sameer Bandekar (USA) and Harry Grewal (Can)
Player of the match: Ruvindu Gunasekera (Can)

- Canada won the toss and elected to bat.
- Bermuda's target was set to 105 off 13 overs due to rain.

4 May
Scorecard

Suriname; 106/8 (20 overs)	v	United States; 107/2 (13.5 overs)
Shazam Ramjohn 24 (30); Karan Ganesh 3/17 (4 overs)		Nicholas Standford 64* (49); Carlton Baker 1/12 (2 overs)

United States won by 8 wickets
Indianapolis World Sports Park
Umpires: Ravishankar Byrappagowda (USA) and Courtney Young (Cay)
Player of the match: Nicholas Standford (USA)

- Suriname won the toss and elected to bat.

5 May
Scorecard

United States; 127/9 (20 overs)	v	Canada; 131/4 (18.4 overs)
Steven Taylor 46 (50); Cecil Pervez 3/9 (3 overs)		Ruvindu Gunasekera 51 (48); Barrington Bartley 1/16 (2 overs)

Canada won by 6 wickets
Indianapolis World Sports Park
Umpires: Sameer Bandekar (USA) and Courtney Young (Cay)
Player of the match: Cecil Pervez (Can)

- United States won the toss and elected to bat.

5 May
Scorecard

Bermuda; 142/2 (20 overs)	v	Suriname; 55 (18.1 overs)
David Hemp 72* (57); Troy Dudnath 1/23 (3 overs)		Gavin Singh 15 (21); Joshua Gilbert 2/4 (1.1 overs)

Bermuda won by 87 runs
Indianapolis World Sports Park
Umpires: Ravishankar Byrappagowda (USA) and Harry Grewal (Can)
Player of the match: David Hemp (Ber)

- Bermuda won the toss and elected to bat.

7 May
10:00
Scorecard

Bermuda; 97/5 (20 overs)	v	United States; 101/2 (12.1 overs)
OJ Pitcher 24† (37); Timil Patel 3/22 (4 overs)		Steven Taylor 60 (39); Jacobi Robinson 1/27 (4 overs)

United States won by 8 wickets
Indianapolis World Sports Park
Umpires: Harry Grewal (Can) and Courtney Young (Cay)
Player of the match: Steven Taylor (USA)

- Bermuda won the toss and elected to bat.

7 May
14:10
Scorecard

Canada; 157/8 (20.0 overs)	v	Suriname; 133/6 (20.0 overs)
Rizwan Cheema 46 (35); Muneshwar Patandin 6/22 (4 overs)		Muneshwar Patandin 36 (35); Saad Bin Zafar 2/17 (3 overs)

Canada won by 24 runs
Indianapolis World Sports Park
Umpires: Sameer Bandekar (USA) and Ravishankar Byrappagowda (USA)
Player of the match: Muneshwar Patandin (Sur)

- Canada won the toss and elected to bat.
- Canada qualified for the World Twenty20 Qualifier as result of this match.

8 May
Scorecard

Suriname; 106 (20 overs)	v	United States; 107/2 (18.2 overs)
Wasim Haslim 21 (17); Timil Patel 4/13 (4 overs)		Fahad Babar 43* (46); Muneshwar Patandin 1/14 (2.2 overs)

United States won by 8 wickets
Indianapolis World Sports Park
Umpires: Ravishankar Byrappagowda (USA) and Courtney Young (Cay)
Player of the match: Timil Patel (USA)

- United States won the toss and elected to field.
- United States qualified for the World Twenty20 Qualifier as result of this match.

8 May
Scorecard

Bermuda; 114/7 (20 overs)	v	Canada; 118/3 (18.2 overs)
Janeiro Tucker 34 (46); Cecil Pervez 3/17 (4 overs)		Jimmy Hansra 68* (59); Jordan DeSilva 1/11 (3 overs)

Canada won by 7 wickets
Indianapolis World Sports Park
Umpires: Sameer Bandekar (USA) and Harry Grewal (Can)
Player of the match: Jimmy Hansra (Can)

- Bermuda won the toss and elected to bat.

9 May
Scorecard

Bermuda; 99/7 (20 overs)	v	Suriname; 103/3 (19 overs)
David Hemp 28 (30); Wasim Haslim 3/15 (4 overs)		Wasim Haslim 39 (46); Janeiro Tucker 2/21 (4 overs)

Suriname won by 7 wickets
Indianapolis World Sports Park
Umpires: Ravishankar Byrappagowda (USA) and Harry Grewal (Can)
Player of the match: Wasim Haslim (Sur)

- Bermuda won the toss and elected to bat.

9 May
Scorecard

Canada; 127/6 (20 overs)	v	United States; 104/8 (20 overs)
Ruvindu Gunasekera 54 (48); Timil Patel 3/20 (4 overs)		Fahad Babar 33 (37); Jimmy Hansra 2/15 (4 overs)

Canada won by 23 runs
Indianapolis World Sports Park
Umpires: Sameer Bandekar (USA) and Courtney Young (Cay)
Player of the match: Ruvindu Gunasekera (Can)

- United States won the toss and elected to field.

== Statistics ==
=== Most runs ===
The top five run scorers (total runs) are included in this table.

Player	Team	Runs	Inns	Avg	S/R	Highest	100s	50s
Fahad Babar	United States	242	6	121.00	110.00	78*	0	1
Ruvindu Gunasekera	Canada	196	6	32.67	101.55	62	0	3
Steven Taylor	United States	167	6	27.83	109.15	60	0	1
David Hemp	Bermuda	156	6	31.20	92.86	72*	0	1
Jimmy Hansra	Canada	143	6	35.75	104.38	68*	0	1

Source: CricHQ

=== Most wickets ===
The top five wicket takers (total wickets) are listed in this table, ranked by wickets taken and then by bowling average.

Player	Team	Overs	Wkts	Ave	SR	Econ	BBI
Timil Patel	United States	24.0	15	7.67	9.60	4.79	4/13
Nikhil Dutta	Canada	23.0	12	9.42	11.50	4.91	4/8
Muneshwar Patandin	Suriname	19.2	10	10.60	11.60	5.48	6/22
Cecil Pervez	Canada	18.0	9	8.67	12.00	4.33	3/9
Karan Ganesh	United States	18.0	7	15.57	15.43	6.06	3/17

Source: CricHQ

== Final standing ==
Position	Team	Status
1	Canada	Qualified for 2015 ICC World Twenty20 Qualifier
2	United States	Qualified for 2015 ICC World Twenty20 Qualifier
3	Bermuda	
4	Suriname	Relegated to ICC Americas Division Two
