= List of international cricket grounds in the United States =

This is a list of cricket grounds in the United States. As of April 2013 The only ICC-certified cricket stadium in North America is Central Broward Regional Park in Lauderhill, Florida. The Leo Magnus Cricket Complex in Los Angeles is an established cricket ground with four fields, while the Indianapolis World Sports Park opened in 2014, and hosted its first major competition the following year, the 2015 Americas Twenty20 Division One.

Official name (known as)	City or town	Capacity	Notes	Ref
Grand Prairie Stadium	Grand Prairie, Texas	7,200 (expandable to 15,000)	Grand Prairie Stadium became one of the five established US facilities for cricket, with it set to host the 2024 T20 World Cup in June.	
Central Broward Regional Park	Lauderhill, Florida	20,000	Hosted four Twenty20 Internationals since 2010, and several ICC Americas regional tournaments.	
Nassau County International Cricket Stadium	East Meadow, New York	34,000	The Nassau County International Cricket Stadium is an upcoming modular cricket stadium proposed to be built in the city of East Meadow in Nassau County, New York, on Long Island. The stadium will be used for the 2024 T20 World Cup games in June.	
Leo Magnus Cricket Complex	Los Angeles	n/a	Hosted five list-A matches between India A and Australia A in 1999.	
Indianapolis World Sports Park	Indianapolis	8,000	Hosted the 2015 Americas Twenty20 Division One tournament.	
Smart Choice Moosa Stadium	Pearland, Texas	2500	Owned by a former sponsor of the U.S. national team. Hosted three warm-up matches for Canada ahead of the 2015 Americas T20 Division One tournament. Hosting ODI matches since 28 May 2022.	
