= Jason Anderson =

Jason Anderson may refer to:

- Jason Anderson (American football) (born 1980), American football player
- Jason Anderson (baseball) (born 1979), Major League Baseball player
- Jason Anderson (cricketer) (born 1979), Bermudian cricketer
- Jason D. Anderson, American video game designer
- Jason Anderson (wrestler) (born 1965), Canadian wrestler
- Jason Anderson (motorcyclist) (born 1993), American professional motocross racer
- Jason Anderson (film critic), see Toronto Film Critics Association
- Jason C. Anderson (1975–2010), American oil rigger died in the Deepwater Horizon explosion
