= Standford (surname) =

Standford is a surname. Notable people with the surname include:

- Nicholas Standford (born 1987), Barbadian-born American cricketer
- Patric Standford (1939–2014), British composer
