= Nicolaas Scholtz =

Nicolaas Scholtz may refer to:

- Nicolaas Scholtz (cricketer)
- Nicolaas Scholtz (tennis)
