= ICC Men's T20I Team Rankings =

International cricket T20I team rankings

- Administrator: International Cricket Council
- Creation: 2011; 15 years ago
- Number of teams: 111 (Currently 101)
- Current top ranking: England (269 rating)
- Longest cumulative top ranking: India (1,829 days)
- Longest continuous top ranking: India (1,601 days)
- Highest rating: Pakistan (286 rating)
- Last updated on: 9 October 2026.

The ICC Men's T20I Team Rankings is an international Twenty20 cricket rankings system of the International Cricket Council. After every Twenty20 International (T20I) match, the two teams involved receive points based on a mathematical formula. The total of each team's points total is divided by the total number of matches to give a rating, and all teams are ranked on a table in order of rating. Teams need to have played at least eight T20I matches in the previous three to four years to remain in the rankings table.

== Current rankings ==
ICC Men's T20I Team Rankings
Team	Matches	Points	Rating
England	42	11,231	267
India	76	20,268	267
Australia	39	10,187	261
New Zealand	55	13,638	248
South Africa	53	12,881	243
Pakistan	62	14,883	241
West Indies	60	14,155	236
Bangladesh	55	12,220	222
Sri Lanka	52	11,489	221
Afghanistan	44	9,679	220
Ireland	29	5,942	205
Zimbabwe	62	12,417	200
United States	20	3,650	183
Nepal	44	7,968	181
Netherlands	24	4,311	180
Namibia	41	7,358	179
Scotland	23	4,116	179
United Arab Emirates	57	9,961	175
Oman	44	6,698	152
Canada	26	3,864	149
Uganda	52	7,331	141
Papua New Guinea	20	2,743	137
Italy	15	1,988	133
Hong Kong	55	7,154	130
Malaysia	59	7,409	126
Kuwait	35	4,360	125
Spain	16	1,961	123
Qatar	41	4,925	120
Jersey	21	2,484	118
Bahrain	71	8,393	118
Saudi Arabia	31	3,551	115
Bermuda	24	2,713	113
Kenya	50	5,434	109
Tanzania	30	2,967	99
Portugal	28	2,525	90
Guernsey	24	2,028	85
Denmark	20	1,682	84
Germany	30	2,488	83
Cayman Islands	28	2,295	82
Nigeria	52	4,187	81
Japan	40	2,931	73
Singapore	36	2,555	71
Austria	66	4,293	65
Sweden	36	2,151	60
Belgium	33	1,923	58
Finland	29	1,623	56
Norway	36	2,006	56
Argentina	14	728	54
France	35	1,753	50
Romania	43	2,134	50
Switzerland	26	1,260	48
Cook Islands	14	649	46
Rwanda	72	3,264	45
Botswana	40	1,778	44
Samoa	21	933	44
Malawi	41	1,807	44
Isle of Man	12	511	43
Philippines	29	1,191	41
Thailand	41	1,635	40
Cambodia	29	1,435	38
Bahamas	20	762	38
Cyprus	26	892	34
Czech Republic	21	716	34
Malta	39	1,326	34
Indonesia	87	2,943	34
Vanuatu	15	491	33
Eswatini	22	713	32
Zambia	21	677	32
South Korea	21	636	30
Ghana	19	571	30
Hungary	35	1,014	29
Panama	15	371	25
Estonia	21	513	24
Cameroon	10	213	21
Falkland Islands	11	223	20
Bhutan	32	642	20
Belize	7	139	20
Mexico	25	445	18
Luxembourg	24	410	17
Brazil	21	353	17
Gibraltar	25	412	16
Mozambique	22	347	16
Israel	12	160	13
Sierra Leone	38	452	12
Maldives	17	167	10
Suriname	10	82	8
Bulgaria	25	202	8
Gambia	8	57	7
Croatia	24	169	7
Seychelles	7	46	7
Serbia	27	112	4
Lesotho	21	80	4
Turkey	17	63	4
Costa Rica	20	55	3
Fiji	9	19	2
Myanmar	29	50	2
Timor-Leste	8	0	0
Ivory Coast	9	0	0
Mongolia	12	0	0
Saint Helena	7	0	0
Slovenia	17	0	0
Mali	10	0	0
Greece	6	0	0
China	13	0	0
Source: ICC Men's T20I Team Rankings, 21 November 2026 See points calculations for more details.

== Points calculations ==
=== Time period ===
Each team scores points based on the results of their matches over the last 3−4 years − the matches played in the 12–24 months since the May before last, plus the matches played in the 24 months before that, for which the matches played and points earned both count half. For example:

	May 2010	May 2011	May 2012	May 2013	May 2014	May 2015
Between May 2013 and April 2014:		Results that were achieved during this period have 50% weighting		Results that were achieved during this period have 100% weighting		
Between May 2014 and April 2015:			Results that were achieved during this period have 50% weighting		Results that were achieved during this period have 100% weighting	

Each May, the matches and points earned between 3 and 4 years ago are removed, and the matches and points earned between 1 and 2 years ago switch from 100% weighting to 50% weighting. For example, on 1 May 2014, the matches played between May 2010 and April 2011 were removed, and the matches played between May 2012 and April 2013 switched to 50% weighting (the matches from May 2011 to April 2012 would have already been at 50% following the previous rerating). This happens overnight, so can result in teams changing positions in the ranking table despite no one playing.

=== Find the points earned from a match ===
Each time two teams play another match, the rankings table is updated as follows, based on the ratings of the teams immediately before they played. To determine the teams' new ratings after a particular match, first calculate the points earned from the match:

If the gap between the ratings of the two teams before the match was less than 40 points, then points will be as follows:

Match result	Points earned
Win	Opponent's rating + 50
Tie	Opponent's rating
Lose	Opponent's rating − 50

If the gap between the ratings of the two teams before the match was at least 40 points, then points will be as follows:

Match result	Points earned
Stronger team wins	Own rating + 10
Weaker team loses	Own rating − 10
Stronger team ties	Own rating − 40
Weaker team ties	Own rating + 40
Stronger team loses	Own rating − 90
Weaker team wins	Own rating + 90

==== Example ====
Suppose Team A, with an initial rating of 100, plays Team B. The table shows the points awarded to the two teams for 9 different initial ratings for B (ranging from 20 to 160), and the three possible match results.

Initial ratings		Scenario	Team A wins & Team B loses. Points earned:				Match tied. Points earned:				Team A loses & Team B wins. Points earned:				Total initial ratings	Total points earned (All 3 results)
Team A	Team B	Scenario	Team A		Team B		Team A		Team B		Team A		Team B		Total initial ratings	Total points earned (All 3 results)
100	20	Initial ratings at least 40 points apart	Stronger team wins: Own rating + 10	110	Weaker team loses: Own rating − 10	10	Stronger team ties: Own rating − 40	60	Weaker team ties: Own rating + 40	60	Stronger team loses: Own rating − 90	10	Weaker team wins: Own rating + 90	110	120	120
100	40	Initial ratings at least 40 points apart	Stronger team wins: Own rating + 10	110	Weaker team loses: Own rating − 10	30	Stronger team ties: Own rating − 40	60	Weaker team ties: Own rating + 40	80	Stronger team loses: Own rating − 90	10	Weaker team wins: Own rating + 90	130	140	140
100	60	Initial ratings at least 40 points apart	Stronger team wins: Own rating + 10	110	Weaker team loses: Own rating − 10	50	Stronger team ties: Own rating − 40	60	Weaker team ties: Own rating + 40	100	Stronger team loses: Own rating − 90	10	Weaker team wins: Own rating + 90	150	160	160
100	70	Initial ratings less than 40 points apart	Win: Opponent's rating + 50	120	Lose: Opponent's rating − 50	50	Tie: Opponent's rating	70	Tie: Opponent's rating	100	Lose: Opponent's rating − 50	20	Win: Opponent's rating + 50	150	170	170
100	90	Initial ratings less than 40 points apart	Win: Opponent's rating + 50	140	Lose: Opponent's rating − 50	50	Tie: Opponent's rating	90	Tie: Opponent's rating	100	Lose: Opponent's rating − 50	40	Win: Opponent's rating + 50	150	190	190
100	110	Initial ratings less than 40 points apart	Win: Opponent's rating + 50	160	Lose: Opponent's rating − 50	50	Tie: Opponent's rating	110	Tie: Opponent's rating	100	Lose: Opponent's rating − 50	60	Win: Opponent's rating + 50	150	210	210
100	130	Initial ratings less than 40 points apart	Win: Opponent's rating + 50	180	Lose: Opponent's rating − 50	50	Tie: Opponent's rating	130	Tie: Opponent's rating	100	Lose: Opponent's rating − 50	80	Win: Opponent's rating + 50	150	230	230
100	140	Initial ratings at least 40 points apart	Weaker team wins: Own rating + 90	190	Stronger team loses: Own rating − 90	50	Weaker team ties: Own rating + 40	140	Stronger team ties: Own rating − 40	100	Weaker team loses: Own rating − 10	90	Stronger team wins: Own rating + 10	150	240	240
100	160	Initial ratings at least 40 points apart	Weaker team wins: Own rating + 90	190	Stronger team loses: Own rating − 90	70	Weaker team ties: Own rating + 40	140	Stronger team ties: Own rating − 40	120	Weaker team loses: Own rating − 10	90	Stronger team wins: Own rating + 10	170	260	260

This illustrates that:

- The winning team earns more points than the losing team. (Unless the ratings are more than 180 apart and the weaker team wins − highly unlikely.)
- Winning always earns a team 100 points more than losing, and 50 more than tying.
- The total points earned by the two teams is always the same as the total initial ratings of the two teams.
- The points earned by a winning team increases as the initial rating (quality) of the opposition increases, within the constraints of earning at least its own initial rating + 10, and no more than its own initial rating + 90. A winning team therefore always earns more points than its initial rating, increasing its overall average rating.
- The points earned by a losing team increases as the initial rating (quality) of the opposition increases, within the constraints of earning at least its own initial rating − 90, and no more than its own initial rating − 10. A losing team therefore always earns fewer points than its initial rating, decreasing its overall average rating.
- In a tie, the weaker team usually earns more points than the stronger team (unless the initial ratings are at least 80 apart), reflecting the fact that a tie is a better result for the weaker team than the stronger team. Also, the stronger team will earn fewer points than its initial rating, decreasing its average, and the weaker team more points that its initial rating, increasing its average.
- For a given result, the rule of how the two teams' points are calculated changes as the initial ratings change, from being based on teams' own ratings when one team is far stronger, to being based on the opponent's ratings when the teams are closely matched, back to being based on own ratings when the other team is far stronger. However, despite these sudden changes in the rule, the number of points awarded for each result changes smoothly as the initial ratings change.

=== Find the new ratings ===
- Each team's rating is equal to its total points scored divided by the total matches played. (Series are not significant in these calculations).
- Add the match points scored to the points already scored (in previous matches as reflected by the table), add one to the number of matches played, and determine the new rating.
- Points earned by teams depend on the opponent's ratings, therefore this system needed to assign base ratings to teams when it started.

== Historical rankings ==
ICC Men's T20I Team Rankings Leaders

This table lists the teams that have historically held the highest rating since the T20I rankings was introduced. In April 2018, the ICC decided to grant full T20I status to all its members. As a result, ratings of leading teams since 2018 have been considerably higher, and cannot be directly compared to those before that date.

Country	Start	End	Duration	Cumulative Days	Highest Rating
England	24 October 2011	7 August 2012	289	289	140
South Africa	8 August 2012	11 September 2012	35	35	137
England	12 September 2012	21 September 2012	10	299	130
South Africa	22 September 2012	28 September 2012	7	42	134
Sri Lanka	29 September 2012	27 March 2014	545	545	134
India	28 March 2014	2 April 2014	6	6	130
Sri Lanka	3 April 2014	3 April 2014	1	546	131
India	4 April 2014	5 April 2014	2	8	132
Sri Lanka	6 April 2014	30 April 2014	25	571	133
India	1 May 2014	6 September 2014	129	137	131
Sri Lanka	7 September 2014	9 January 2016	490	1,061	135
West Indies	10 January 2016	30 January 2016	21	21	118
India	31 January 2016	8 February 2016	9	146	120
Sri Lanka	9 February 2016	11 February 2016	3	1,064	121
India	12 February 2016	3 May 2016	82	228	127
New Zealand	4 May 2016	31 October 2017	546	546	132
Pakistan	1 November 2017	3 November 2017	3	3	124
New Zealand	4 November 2017	6 November 2017	3	549	124
Pakistan	7 November 2017	2 January 2018	57	60	124
New Zealand	3 January 2018	27 January 2018	25	574	128
Pakistan	28 January 2018	30 April 2020	824	884	286
Australia	1 May 2020	5 September 2020	128	128	278
England	6 September 2020	7 September 2020	2	301	273
Australia	8 September 2020	30 November 2020	84	212	275
England	1 December 2020	20 February 2022	447	748	278
India	21 February 2022	10 July 2026	1,601	1,829	275
England	11 July 2026	24 July 2026	14	762	268
India	25 July 2026	18 September 2026	56	1,885	268
England	19 September 2026	21 September 2026	3	765	268
India	22 September 2026	8 October 2026	17	1,902	270
England	9 October 2026	Present	43	808	269
Last updated 21 November 2026

== Summary ==
The summary of teams that have held the highest rating by days, are:

Team	Total Days	Highest Rating
India	1,902	275
Sri Lanka	1,064	135
Pakistan	884	286
England	808	278
New Zealand	574	132
Australia	212	278
South Africa	42	137
West Indies	21	118

== Top ranked teams in the ICC Annual Rankings every year ==
Year	Top team
2011	England
2012	England
2013	Sri Lanka
2014	Sri Lanka
2015	Sri Lanka
2016	New Zealand
2017	New Zealand
2018	Pakistan
2019	Pakistan
2020	Australia
2021	England
2022	India
2023	India
2024	India
2025	India
2026	India

== See also ==
- ICC men's ODI team rankings
- ICC men's Test team rankings
- ICC women's ODI and T20I rankings
- List of Twenty20 international records
- International cricket
- ICC player rankings
