= Jamie Nussbaumer =

Guernsey cricketer

Personal information
- Born: 27 June 1987 (age 39)

International information
- National side: Guernsey
- Source: Cricinfo, 19 July 2015

James A.J. Nussbaumer, also known as Jamie Nussbaumer, (born 27 June 1987) is a cricketer who plays for the Guernsey cricket team. He played in the 2014 ICC World Cricket League Division Five tournament. He played in the 2016 ICC World Cricket League Division Five tournament.

== Personal life and club career ==
Jamie Nussbaumer is the son of David Nussbaumer and grandson of Austrian Toni Nussbaumer, who became a hotelier and businessman in Guernsey. He attended school at Elizabeth College, Guernsey. During his time at school, he represented them in cricket, scoring a maiden century in his first match after being called up to replace a player who had gone to watch England against Australia at the Rose Bowl in Southampton. He also played club cricket for Cobo Cricket Club. In 2009, he was invited to join Sussex County Cricket Club on a pre-season training camp in South Africa. In 2010, he played for Sussex's academy in a one-day tournament. In 2012 during the 2012 Summer Olympics in London, he expressed a comment that "Dressage is just not a sport" after Sark born Carl Hester had won gold in the team dressage event.

=== International career ===
Nussbaumer was called up to the Guernsey under-19s team in 2006. In 2013, he was named as the captain of Guernsey and led a call for more players to participate in cricket following a decline in numbers of people playing it in Guernsey. Nussbaumer captained them for four World Cricket League tournaments. He continued as Guernsey captain until 2017 when he stepped down due to wishing to spend more time with his family and due to concerns he would be rested too much to be an effective captain.
