= Jack Vare =

Papua New Guinean cricketer (born 1986)

Personal information
- Full name: Jack Nomani Tiki Vare
- Born: 14 February 1986 (age 40); Hanuabada, Papua New Guinea
- Nickname: JV
- Height: 1.75 m (5 ft 9 in)
- Batting: Right-handed
- Role: Wicket-keeper

International information
- National side: Papua New Guinea
- ODI debut (cap 11): 8 November 2014 v Hong Kong
- Last ODI: 8 March 2018 v West Indies
- T20I debut (cap 11): 15 July 2015 v Ireland
- Last T20I: 14 April 2017 v UAE

Career statistics
Competition	ODI	T20I	FC	LA
Matches	9	8	6	28
Runs scored	81	68	180	417
Batting average	10.12	9.71	18.00	18.95
100s/50s	0/0	0/0	0/0	0/2
Top score	28	38	42	96
Catches/stumpings	6/3	4/2	8/3	26/6
- Source: Cricinfo, 18 March 2018

Jack Nomani Tiki Vare (born 14 February 1986) is a Papua New Guinean cricketer. Vare plays as a right-handed batsman and wicket-keeper.

Having played age group cricket for Papua New Guinea Under-19s in the 2004 Under-19 World Cup, he was selected as a part of the Papua New Guinea squad for the 2011 World Cricket League Division Three, where he played 6 matches, helping them earn promotion to 2011 World Cricket League Division Two. It was in this competition that he made his List A debut against Bermuda. He played a further 5 List A matches in the competition, the last coming against Hong Kong. In his 6 matches in the competition, he scored 81 runs at a batting average of 13.50, with a high score of 28. Behind the stumps he took 9 catches. In the ICC Cricket World Cup Qualifier, he scored a brisk 96 off 59 balls (7x4, 7x6) against Netherlands at Pukekura Park in New Plymouth.

== International career ==
Vare made his One Day International debut for Papua New Guinea on 8 November 2014 against Hong Kong in Australia. He made his Twenty20 International debut for Papua New Guinea against Ireland in the 2015 ICC World Twenty20 Qualifier tournament on 15 July 2015.
