= Barrington Bartley =

Jamaican-born American cricketer

Personal information
- Full name: Barrington Sylvester Bartley
- Born: 19 October 1980 (age 46); Jamaica
- Batting: Right-handed
- Bowling: Slow left-arm orthodox
- Role: All-rounder

International information
- National side: United States (2005–2015)

Career statistics
Competition	List A	T20
Matches	9	5
Runs scored	166	37
Batting average	20.75	7.40
100s/50s	0/1	0/0
Top score	52	15
Balls bowled	354	72
Wickets	5	2
Bowling average	62.80	68.00
5 wickets in innings	0	0
10 wickets in match	0	0
Best bowling	2/55	2/48
Catches/stumpings	3/–	0/–
- Source: CricketArchive, 9 April 2015

Barrington Sylvester Bartley (born 19 October 1980) is an American cricketer of Jamaican birth. He made his debut for the American national team at the 2005 ICC Trophy, and has since played for the side in a number of international tournaments. Bartley is a left-arm orthodox spinner, although he bats with the opposite hand, and has been noted as "one of the best fielders in the country".

Before moving to New York City, Bartley represented Jamaica at the 1998 and 1999 West Indian under-19 championships, where his teammates included future West Indies players Chris Gayle, Jermaine Lawson, Ricardo Powell, and Marlon Samuels. Bartley and Lawson went to school together, and Lawson moved to New York after the conclusion of his West Indies career, like Bartley going on to represent the American national team. Bartley made his debut for the U.S. national team at the 2005 ICC Trophy in Ireland, with no previous experience in international matches. He featured in all six of the team's games, and, despite making a duck on debut against the United Arab Emirates, featured in both the U.S.'s top five runscorers and top five wicket takers. Against Bermuda, he topscored with 52 from 35 balls, hitting two sixes before being bowled by Saleem Mukuddem. That innings remained his highest score in list-A matches – his only other games in that format came for the U.S. in the 2008–09 season of the WICB Cup (the West Indian domestic one-day tournament), where he played three matches.

After the WICB Cup, Bartley did not again appear for the United States until the 2012–13 season, when he featured in the annual Auty Cup fixture against Canada. He remained very active in American domestic cricket, however, playing club cricket in New York and also captaining a new side, the Bedessee New York Destroyers, in a national Twenty20 tournament. In 2008, Bartley and several other Jamaican-born players in the United States were profiled in a Sports Illustrated piece on American cricket. At the 2013 Americas Twenty20 Division One tournament in Florida, Bartley made his first appearance in an ICC tournament since 2005, with his eight games yielding 36 runs (with only one dismissal, for an average of 36.00) and six wickets. He bowled more overs than any other American player, with his best figures, 2/9, coming against the Bahamas.

In a friendly match against Bermuda after the end of the tournament, Bartley hit 111 not out from 65 balls, an innings which included nine sixes. Despite this, Bermuda chased down the U.S.'s target of 284 with two balls to spare, with David Hemp (who hit 103 from 114 balls) named man of the match in preference to Bartley. The U.S. qualified for the 2013 World Twenty20 Qualifier in the UAE by virtue of their performance at the Americas regional tournament. Bartley featured in five matches at the tournament, which had full Twenty20 status, but had little success with his left-arm spin – his economy rate of 11.33 runs an over was the worst of any American who bowled more than six balls. Against Hong Kong, his three overs went for 48 runs, although he did claim the wickets of James Atkinson and Nizakat Khan (his only wickets of the tournament). Bartley is a member of the U.S. squad for the 2015 Americas Twenty20 Championship, to be played in Indiana in May 2015.
