= Mrunal Patel =

Indian-born American cricketer

Personal information
- Full name: Mrunal Ketan Patel
- Born: October 28, 1986 (age 40); Gandhinagar, Gujarat, India
- Batting: Left-handed
- Bowling: Left-arm orthodox

International information
- National side: Gujrat (2015)
- Source: CricketArchive, July 11, 2015

Mrunal Ketan Patel (born October 28, 1986) is an Indian-born American cricketer who made his debut for the U. S. national side in July 2015. A left-handed batsman and left-arm orthodox bowler, he earlier played for the U.S. under-19 side at the 2006 Under-19 World Cup.

Born in Gandhinagar, Gujarat, Patel played underage cricket for Gujarat representative sides before emigrating to the United States, including at under-19 level during the 2002–03 season (when he was only 16). In early 2006, he was selected in the U.S. squad for the 2006 Under-19 World Cup in Sri Lanka, and participated in the team's warm-up tour of India, hosted by the Hyderabad Cricket Association. At the World Cup, Patel played in all five possible matches for his team, all of which had under-19 One Day International (ODI) status. He took four wickets, with of a best of 2/23 against the West Indies, and only three American players scored more runs at the tournament. Playing his club cricket in the Southern California Cricket Association, Patel did not again make a national squad until 2015, when he was a replacement for Japen Patel at the 2015 Americas Twenty20 Championship. He retained his place in the U.S. squad for the 2015 World Twenty20 Qualifier in Ireland and Scotland, and went on to make his Twenty20 debut in the opening match of the tournament, against Nepal.

In January 2018, he was named in the United States squad for the 2017–18 Regional Super50 tournament in the West Indies. He made his List A debut for the United States in the 2017–18 Regional Super50 on 31 January 2018. In June 2021, he was selected to take part in the Minor League Cricket tournament in the United States following the players' draft.
