= Nicholas Standford =

Barbadian-born American cricketer

Personal information
- Full name: Nicholas Ian Standford
- Born: June 4, 1987 (age 39); Bridgetown, Barbados
- Batting: Right-handed
- Bowling: Right-arm medium

International information
- National side: United States (2012–2016)
- Source: CricketArchive, November 24, 2016

Nicholas Standford (born June 4, 1987) is an American cricketer of Barbadian origin who made his debut for the U.S. national team in November 2012. He is a right-handed top-order batsman and occasional right-arm medium bowler.

Standford was born in Bridgetown, and attended Queen's College and The Lodge School, playing cricket for the school teams. He went on to represent Barbados at the 2004 West Indian under-19 tournament, playing alongside several future Barbados national team players. Standford emigrated to the United States the following year, settling in New York City and taking up club cricket there. He was first selected for the U.S. national team in the annual Auty Cup series against Canada in 2012. This followed a club season that had included a double century, 201 not out, in a 40-over match in Long Island. Standford was retained in the national side for the 2013 Americas Twenty20 Championship the following year, and featured in all eight matches, placing fourth in the batting aggregates (behind Steven Taylor, Akeem Dodson, and Orlando Baker).

Later in 2013, Standford again featured in the Auty Cup series, but he did not again make a national squad until 2015, when he was selected for the 2015 ICC Americas Twenty20 Championship. There, he was behind only Fahad Babar and Steven Taylor for runs scored, playing in every match. Against Suriname, he recorded his first half-century in U.S. colours, scoring 64 not out from 49 balls to be named man of the match. Standford retained his place in the squad for the 2015 World Twenty20 Qualifier in Ireland and Scotland, and went on to make his full Twenty20 debut in the second match of the tournament, against Ireland.

He made his List A debut for ICC Americas in the 2016–17 Regional Super50 on 26 January 2017.
