= Courtney Young =

Caymanian cricket umpire

Personal information
- Born: 11 February 1955 (age 71); Jamaica

Umpiring information
- T20Is umpired: 4 (2022–2025)
- FC umpired: 4 (2004–2007)
- Source: Cricinfo, 18 April 2022

Courtney Young (born 11 February 1955) is a Caymanian cricket umpire who sits on the ICC Associates and Affiliates Umpire Panel. He made his first-class umpiring debut in 2004, and has since regularly umpired in International Cricket Council (ICC) tournaments.

== Biography ==
Young was born in Jamaica in 1955. One of twelve siblings, he grew up in Clarendon, and went on to attend Glenmuir High School, subsequently studying surveying at the College of Arts, Science and Technology (now the University of Technology). His work as a land surveyor first brought him to the Cayman Islands in 1984, to work on the Cayman Brac airport, and he emigrated permanently in 1987, taking up a surveying job with the Caymanian government. Although he had played club cricket in both Jamaica and the Cayman Islands, Young later concentrated on umpiring, and in 1995 became the inaugural president of the Cayman Islands Cricket Umpires Association (CICUA). He relinquished the position in 2012.

Having previously only umpired domestically, Young made his umpiring debut at an international tournament in 2000, standing in the inaugural edition of the Americas Championship. He officiated in the 2004 edition of the same tournament, held in July 2004, and later in the month was selected to make his first-class umpiring debut, standing alongside another Caymanian, Hubert Smythe, in the 2004 Intercontinental Cup fixture between Bermuda and the United States. The pair also umpired in the Bermuda–Canada fixture in Toronto the following month. Young went on to umpire two more first-class matches, both of which were Intercontinental Cup home matches for Canada – against Kenya in July 2006 and against the United Arab Emirates in July 2007. He has umpired in at least one international tournament in every year since, regularly standing in ICC Americas tournaments, and also umpired at the 2012 Under-19 World Cup in Australia. Young has served on the 11-member ICC Associates and Affiliates Umpire Panel since 2011, and was most recently re-appointed in January 2015, as one of two representatives from the Americas region (alongside American umpire Sameer Bandekar).

In October 2016 he was selected as one of the eight umpires to stand in matches in the 2016 ICC World Cricket League Division Four tournament.

In April 2022, Young stood in his first Twenty20 International (T20I) fixture as an on-field umpire, in the third match between the Cayman Islands and the Bahamas.

== See also ==
- List of Twenty20 International cricket umpires
