= Indianapolis World Sports Park =

Municipal park in Indianapolis, Indiana, US

- Location within Indianapolis
- Type: Urban park
- Location: 1313 South Post Road; Indianapolis, Indiana, United States
- Coordinates: 39°45′08″N 86°00′14″W
- Area: 46 acres (19 ha)
- Created: 2014
- Operator: Indy Parks and Recreation
- Open: All year
- Website: Official website

Indianapolis World Sports Park is an American sporting complex in Indianapolis, Indiana. The site covers 46 acres (19 ha) at the former Post Road Community Park and consists of three multi-use fields for the sports of cricket, lacrosse, hurling, rugby, Australian rules football, and Gaelic football. The $5.1 million facility was completed in 2014.

== History ==
Announced in 2013 as an initiative of Mayor Greg Ballard, the facility was slated to host the U.S. cricket men's national championship in August 2014 as its inaugural event, but city officials canceled a three-year hosting contract with the national cricketing group in May of that year, citing "deteriorated" communication about sponsorships, publicity, and other event planning details. The city said the breakdown between the groups began after U.S. cricket director Darren Beazley stepped down in March.

Despite losing the national cricket tournament, city officials completed the project, scaling back the number of fields from five to three and eliminating plans for a concession pavilion, maintenance building, and additional parking, which helped the project come in about $1 million under budget. With the changes, one of the three fields was not built to "international standards for professional play", according to the Indianapolis Business Journal. At the complex's first major cricket tournament, only one field was approved for international play, as it had a natural-turf oval; the secondary field is synthetic. Unlike larger U.S. facilities such as Central Broward Regional Park, the facility lacks floodlights, a pavilion, a clubhouse or changing rooms for players, a media area, concession stands, and bleachers for fans.

The project was controversial in Indianapolis. The facility's funding came from the city's "RebuildIndy" initiative, which was intended to fund infrastructure improvements. Indianapolis City-County Council members criticized the mayor and the project, saying the money would be better spent on roadwork and sidewalks. Also, the project was seen as an extravagant expense for a city which at the time was facing a $40 million budget deficit and a crime wave with an understaffed police department.

The complex is located in a residential area on the east side of the city with several houses on the north boundary within a batsman's striking range. During construction, irrigation pumping at the park was alleged to have depleted several nearby water wells. The city lowered some residential pumps and replaced at least one well, costing about $15,000.

== Events ==
The first event held at the park was a local Gaelic games tournament in August 2014, with local and regional cricket matches also held that year. In May 2015, the park hosted its first international cricket event, the 2015 ICC Americas Twenty20 Division One tournament in which Bermuda, Canada, Suriname and the United States participated. Canada and the U.S. advanced to the 2015 World Twenty20 Qualifier, a feeder tournament for the 2016 ICC World Twenty20. Bermuda was relegated to ICC Americas Twenty20 Division Two. Total attendance for the 24-match tournament was fewer than 1,000 people, with 60 spectators reported at one game.

The main cricket field was hailed as being of Test-match quality, according to the groundsman who worked at the facility during the event. "It's a full sand carpet outfield which is pretty much the world's best standard practice for building outfields. The drainage is phenomenal," he said. Cricketers David Hemp and Nicholas Standford respectively praised the outfield as "magnificent" and the facility as "excellent". Despite the praise, writer Peter Della Penna noted that "most other aspects outside the ropes were makeshift accommodations that would only be suitable at amateur level", citing the lack of standard amenities for players, fans, and media.

Indianapolis hosted the inaugural ICC Americas Combine in September 2015. After the International Cricket Council approved six Caribbean Premier League matches to be played in the U.S. in 2016, the venue was mentioned as a possible host. However, the games were slated for Central Broward Regional Park in Florida, the only American venue approved for one day international matches by the International Cricket Council.

When the ICC Americas cricket office was relocated from Toronto in 2016, Indianapolis was reported to be "a particularly strong contender", though Colorado Springs, Colorado was ultimately selected.

== See also ==
- List of parks in Indianapolis
- List of cricket grounds in the United States
