= Nisarg Patel =

American cricketer

Personal information
- Full name: Nisarg Ketankumar Patel
- Born: April 20, 1988 (age 38); Ahmedabad, Gujarat, India
- Bowling: Slow left-arm orthodox
- Role: Bowler

International information
- National side: United States (2019–present)
- ODI debut (cap 26): September 13, 2019 v PNG
- Last ODI: July 6, 2023 v UAE
- ODI shirt no.: 7
- T20I debut (cap 14): August 18, 2019 v Bermuda
- Last T20I: May 25, 2024 v Bangladesh
- Source: ESPNcricinfo, 29 November 2022

Nisarg Patel (born April 20, 1988) is an Indian-born American cricketer who plays for the United States national cricket team as a left-arm orthodox spin bowler.

== Personal life ==
Patel was born in Ahmedabad, Gujarat. He attended school in India before moving to the United States as a teenager in 2003, where his family settled in Southern California.

Patel holds a master's degree in pharmaceutical science. He worked in England for several years at the local branch of an American pharmaceutical company, obtaining British citizenship. He later transferred back to Los Angeles in a project management role.

== Junior career ==
Patel represented the United States national under-19 cricket team at the 2006 Under-19 Cricket World Cup in Sri Lanka.

== International career ==
Patel was chosen in the U.S. squad for the 2015 ICC Americas Twenty20 Division One, but was subsequently ruled ineligible for the tournament by the ICC on the grounds he had not demonstrated the residency requirements for non-citizens.

Patel made his senior debut for the United States against Canada in the 2017 Auty Cup fixture. In January 2018, he was named in the United States squad for the 2017–18 Regional Super50 tournament in the West Indies. He made his List A debut for the United States against the Leeward Islands in the 2017–18 Regional Super50 on January 31, 2018.

In November 2018, he was added to the United States' squad for the 2018 ICC World Cricket League Division Three tournament in Oman. In June 2019, he was named in a 30-man training squad for the United States cricket team, ahead of the Regional Finals of the 2018–19 ICC T20 World Cup Americas Qualifier tournament in Bermuda. The following month, he was one of twelve players to sign a three-month central contract with USA Cricket.

In August 2019, he was named in the United States' squad for the Regional Finals of the 2018–19 ICC T20 World Cup Americas Qualifier tournament. He made his Twenty20 International (T20I) debut for the United States against Bermuda on August 18, 2019. In September 2019, he was named in United States' One Day International (ODI) squad for the 2019 United States Tri-Nation Series. He made his ODI debut for the United States, against Papua New Guinea, on September 13, 2019.

In November 2019, he was named in the United States' squad for the 2019–20 Regional Super50 tournament. In November 2020, Patel's bowling action was deemed to be illegal by the International Cricket Council (ICC). In February 2021, he was cleared by the ICC to resume bowling in international matches. In June 2021, he was selected to take part in the Minor League Cricket tournament in the United States following the players' draft.

In October 2021, he was named in the American squad for the 2021 ICC Men's T20 World Cup Americas Qualifier tournament in Antigua.
