= Karan Ganesh =

American cricketer (born 1986)

Personal information
- Born: October 24, 1986 (age 40); Berbice, Guyana
- Batting: Right-handed

International information
- National side: United States
- Source: Cricinfo, October 24, 2014

Karan Ganesh (born October 24, 1986) is an American cricketer. He played in the 2014 ICC World Cricket League Division Three tournament.
