= Christian Burgess (cricketer) =

Bermudian cricketer (born 1994)

Personal information
- Born: 24 April 1994 (age 32); Bermuda
- Batting: Left-handed
- Role: Wicket-keeper

International information
- National side: Bermuda

Career statistics
Competition	FC	LA	T20
Matches	1	2	2
Runs scored	0	25	4
Batting average	–	12.50	–
100s/50s	0/0	0/0	0/0
Top score	0*	16	4*
Catches/stumpings	0/0	2/0	0/0
- Source: Cricinfo, 31 March 2013

Christian Burgess (born 24 April 1994) is a Bermudian cricketer who plays for the national cricket team. Burgess is a left-handed batsman who plays as a wicket-keeper.

Burgess made his debut for Bermuda in 2010 in a first-class match in the Intercontinental Shield against the United Arab Emirates at the National Stadium, Hamilton. He batted twice in the match, ending each innings not out without scoring, with Bermuda losing the match by 9 wickets. Immediately following this match, he made his debut in List A cricket, playing two matches in that format against the United Arab Emirates, scoring 25 runs with a high score of 16. He then played in two Twenty20 matches against the same opposition.
