= Ruvindu Gunasekera =

Sri Lankan-born cricketer (born 1991)

Personal information
- Full name: Ruvindu Gunasekera
- Born: 20 July 1991 (age 35); Colombo, Sri Lanka
- Batting: Left-handed
- Bowling: Right-arm leg-break
- Role: Batsman

International information
- National side: Canada (2008–2014)
- ODI debut (cap 57): 1 July 2008 v Bermuda
- Last ODI: 28 January 2014 v Netherlands
- ODI shirt no.: 57
- T20I debut (cap 30): 13 March 2012 v Netherlands
- Last T20I: 26 November 2013 v Kenya
- T20I shirt no.: 57

Career statistics
Competition	ODI	T20I	FC	LA
Matches	19	8	21	47
Runs scored	455	202	896	1,184
Batting average	23.94	25.25	24.88	25.73
100s/50s	0/6	0/1	1/6	0/12
Top score	72	65	150	87
Balls bowled	–	–	626	161
Wickets	–	–	13	9
Bowling average	–	–	29.53	16.22
5 wickets in innings	–	–	0	0
10 wickets in match	–	–	0	0
Best bowling	–	–	4/34	4/37
Catches/stumpings	7/–	0/–	13/–	19/–
- Source: ESPNcricinfo, 12 February 2018

Ruvindu Gunasekera (born 20 July 1991) is a Sri Lankan-born cricketer who played One Day International cricket for Canada and under-19 cricket for Sri Lanka.

== Early life ==
Gunasekara was born in Colombo, Sri Lanka, where he began playing cricket at an early age, under the influence of his father, who was a player on the Sri Lanka A cricket team. Gunasekara immigrated to Toronto, Canada in 2006. He enrolled at the Scarborough campus at the University of Toronto in 2010, pursuing a degree in management.

== Career ==
=== Sri Lanka ===
Gunasekera was a member of the Sri Lanka team for the ICC Under 19 World Cup in New Zealand.

In March 2018, he was the leading run-scorer in the 2017–18 SLC Twenty20 Tournament in Sri Lanka, with 272 runs in five matches, batting for Saracens Sports Club. The following month, he was also named in Dambulla's squad for the 2018 Super Provincial One Day Tournament.

In August 2018, he was named in Dambulla's squad the 2018 SLC T20 League. In February 2019, Sri Lanka Cricket named him as the Best Batsman in the 2017–18 SLC Twenty20 Tournament.

=== Canada ===
In January 2018, he was named in Canada's squad for the 2018 ICC World Cricket League Division Two tournament. On 3 June 2018, he was selected to play for the Vancouver Knights in the players' draft for the inaugural edition of the Global T20 Canada tournament. In April 2019, he was named in Canada's squad for the 2019 ICC World Cricket League Division Two tournament in Namibia.

In June 2021, he was selected to take part in the Minor League Cricket tournament in the United States following the players' draft.
