= Sameer Bandekar =

Indian cricket umpire (born 1964)

Personal information
- Born: 29 October 1964 (age 62); India
- Role: Umpire

Umpiring information
- ODIs umpired: 9 (2002–2022)
- T20Is umpired: 8 (2021–2024)
- WODIs umpired: 4 (1997–2010)
- WT20Is umpired: 8 (2019–2021)
- Source: ESPNcricinfo, 15 June 2022

Sameer Bandekar (born 29 October 1964) is an Indian cricket umpire who currently represents the United States. The first international match that Bandekar officiated in was a women's One Day International (ODI) in 1997. He stood in his first men's ODI match in 2002. He later emigrated to the United States, and was elected to the ICC Associates and Affiliates Umpire Panel in 2015. He stood in matches in the 2015 ICC Americas Twenty20 Division One tournament. He umpired in his first men's Twenty20 International (T20I) on 22 December 2021, between United States and Ireland.

In January 2022, Bandekar was named as one of the on-field umpires for the 2022 ICC Under-19 Cricket World Cup in the West Indies.

== See also ==
- List of One Day International cricket umpires
- List of Twenty20 International cricket umpires
