= Joshua Gilbert (cricketer) =

Personal information
- Born: 23 September 1993 (age 33); Bermuda
- Batting: Right-handed
- Bowling: Right-arm off break

International information
- National side: Bermuda

Career statistics
Competition	FC	LA	T20
Matches	1	1	1
Runs scored	7	4	0
Batting average	3.50	4.00	–
100s/50s	0/0	0/0	0/0
Top score	5	4	0*
Balls bowled	162	60	24
Wickets	3	4	1
Bowling average	32.33	11.75	37.00
5 wickets in innings	0	0	0
10 wickets in match	0	0	0
Best bowling	3/85	4/47	1/37
Catches/stumpings	0/–	0/–	0/–
- Source: Cricinfo, 20 February 2012

Joshua Gilbert (born 23 September 1993) is a Bermudian cricketer. Gilbert is a right-handed batsman who bowls right-arm off break. He was born in Bermuda.

In 2010, Gilbert made his debut for Bermuda in a first-class match against the United Arab Emirates in the 2009-10 Intercontinental Shield at the National Stadium, Hamilton. He scored seven runs in this match, as well as taking three wickets, those of Arshad Ali, Khurram Khan and Saqib Ali, for the cost of 85 runs from 23 overs in the United Arab Emirates first-innings. Following the match he made his List A debut against the same opponents, taking figures of 4/47 in the match, as well as making his Twenty20 debut against the same opposition following this match.

He was selected as part of Bermuda's squad for the World Twenty20 Qualifier.
