= Jordan DeSilva =

Bermudian cricketer (born 1990)

Personal information
- Full name: Jordan Anthony DeSilva
- Born: 4 May 1990 (age 36); Bermuda
- Batting: Left-handed
- Bowling: Left-arm fast-medium

International information
- National side: Bermuda

Career statistics
Competition	FC	LA	T20
Matches	1	3	2
Runs scored	22	47	28
Batting average	11.00	15.66	14.00
100s/50s	0/0	0/0	0/0
Top score	16	20	18
Balls bowled	153	168	48
Wickets	–	5	2
Bowling average	–	25.60	30.50
5 wickets in innings	–	0	0
10 wickets in match	–	0	0
Best bowling	–	4/40	2/33
Catches/stumpings	1/–	1/–	0/–
- Source: Cricinfo, 31 March 2013

Jordan Anthony DeSilva (born 4 May 1990) is a Bermudian cricketer who plays for the national cricket team. DeSilva is a left-handed batsman who bowls left-arm fast-medium.

DeSilva was selected in Bermuda Under-19s sixteen-man squad for the 2008 Under-19 Cricket World Cup, making his Youth One Day International (YODI) debut against Bangladesh Under-19s, with him making a further four YODIs in the tournament. He later made his senior debut for Bermuda in a List A match against Uganda in 2009 at the National Stadium, Hamilton. The following year he made a second List A appearance against Namibia during Bermuda's tour of Namibia in April 2010. In July 2010, he made his first-class debut against the United Arab Emirates at Hamilton in the Intercontinental Shield. He followed this up immediately after that fixture making a single List A appearance against the same opposition, as well as playing two Twenty20 matches.
