= Akeem Dodson =

American cricketer

Personal information
- Full name: Akeem Levar Dodson
- Born: September 6, 1987 (age 39); Queens, New York, U.S.
- Nickname: "Spoogy"
- Batting: Left-handed
- Role: Wicket-keeper

International information
- National side: United States (2008–2015)

Career statistics
Competition	LA	T20
Matches	3	12
Runs scored	35	252
Batting average	17.50	21.00
100s/50s	0/0	0/0
Top score	31*	49
Catches/stumpings	3/3	8/5
- Source: CricketArchive, September 22, 2015

Akeem Levar Dodson (born September 6, 1987) is an American professional cricketer. From New York City, he made his senior debut for the United States national team in 2008, having earlier played for the national under-19 side at the 2006 Under-19 World Cup. A left-handed wicket-keeper/batsman, Dodson represented the United States at the 2013 and 2015 World Twenty20 Qualifiers. He last represented the national team in 2017, and continues to play semi-professionally.

== Junior career ==
Dodson was born in Queens, New York, to a Guyanese father. His early childhood was spent in Guyana and rural Pennsylvania, but after his family returned to New York City he attended Darul Uloom New York, an Islamic school, where he gained the title hafiz for his memorization of the Quran. Aged only 15, Dodson made his international under-19 debut at the 2003 Americas Under-19 Championship, played in King City, Ontario. The United States won only a single match at the tournament, finishing fourth behind Canada, Bermuda, and the Cayman Islands. Dodson scored 89 runs from his four matches, the second-most for his team, and also recorded six dismissals while keeping wicket. He retained his place in the side for the 2005 edition of the tournament, again played in Ontario. The United States won all four of its matches at the tournament to qualify for the 2006 Under-19 World Cup in Sri Lanka, although Dodson's four innings yielded only 48 runs.

At the 2006 World Cup, Dodson was the only wicket-keeper chosen in the American squad, and consequently played in all five of the team's matches, which were accorded under-19 One Day International (ODI) status. His 84 runs at the tournament put him amongst the team's three best batsmen, with his highest score being 43 against the West Indies. Placed in a group with three ICC full members (Australia, South Africa, and the West Indies), the U.S. lost all three of its group-stage matches, but did win a game against Namibia in the plate competition (for teams eliminated in the group stages). Dodson's underage career continued at state level in the United States, where he captained New York to victory at the 2007 National Under-19 Championships.

== Senior career ==
Dodson was first selected for the U.S. senior squad at the 2006 Americas Championship Division One tournament in Canada, but played no matches at the tournament. His debut for the senior team came in November 2008, during the 2008–09 season of the WICB Cup, where the United States were competing as an invitational team. As the West Indian domestic limited-overs competition, matches at the tournament had List A status. Dodson played in three out of a possible four games for the U.S., with the other match, against Jamaica, abandoned due to rain. After a duck on debut against Barbados, he scored 31 not out against Trinidad and Tobago, coming in seventh in the batting order. The captain of the U.S. team at the tournament was Jamaican-born Orlando Baker, who played for the same New York City club as Dodson, and encourage him to pursue wicket-keeping.

Dodson made only a single appearance for the U.S. team at its next major tournament, the 2008 Americas Division One tournament in Fort Lauderdale. He did not bat in that match, against Argentina, with Carl Wright preferred as wicket-keeper in the other matches. Dodson spent the 2009 season playing club cricket in England. He spent the season with Waresley, which plays in the county leagues in both Bedfordshire and Huntingdonshire, and hit three centuries, including a score of 190. Dodson did not appear again for the U.S. national team until July 2011, when he was selected to keep wicket for the side at the 2011 Americas Twenty20 Division One tournament in Florida. There, he scored only 28 runs from his three innings, with the U.S. finishing second behind Canada. Both teams proceeded to the 2012 World Twenty20 Qualifier, but Steven Taylor and Nauman Mustafa were selected ahead of Dodson as wicket-keepers in the American squad for that tournament.

At the next major competition for the United States, the 2012 World Cricket League Division Four tournament in Malaysia, Dodson made the initial squad, but Steven Taylor was preferred as wicket-keeper for all but one game, against Singapore. At the 2013 Americas Division One Twenty20, Dodson played in seven of an eight possible matches, and was second only to Taylor in runs scored. Against Suriname in the opening game, he was named man of the match after hitting 54* from 40 balls. The U.S. won that tournament to qualify for the 2013 World Twenty20 Qualifier in the United Arab Emirates, where matches had full Twenty20 status. Playing six of a possible seven games, Dodson topscored in two matches, with 27 against Ireland and 41 against Denmark (from only 26 balls), but finished with only 87 runs from six innings as the U.S. lost all but one of its group-stage matches.

In November 2014, Dodson was one of at least six national squad players to publicly criticise the leadership of the USA Cricket Association (USACA), along with Orlando Baker and Timroy Allen. Dodson cited the organisation's "constant refusal to invest in proper team preparation and management", and threatened to withdraw from any USACA-selected teams. USACA responded by stating that it would consider changes to its constitution at the 2014 AGM, with the intention of satisfying player demands. Dodson was recalled to the national squad in April 2015, for the 2015 Americas Division One Twenty20 tournament the following month. He was one of only four American-born players in the team, the others being Steven Taylor, Hammad Shahid, and Jasdeep Singh. At the tournament, Dodson scored only one run from his three matches, with ducks against both Bermuda and Suriname. He kept wicket only against Bermuda, in the other games playing exclusively as a batsman, as part of a middle order that one writer suggested would "come under the microscope from selectors".

In June 2021, he was selected to take part in the Minor League Cricket tournament in the United States following the players' draft.
