= Nicolaas Scholtz (cricketer) =

Namibian cricketer

Personal information
- Full name: Nicolaas Reimert Petrus Scholtz
- Born: 5 November 1986 (age 40); Keetmanshoop, South West Africa
- Batting: Left-handed
- Bowling: Leg break
- Relatives: Bernard Scholtz (brother)

International information
- National side: Namibia (2006/07–2017/18)

Career statistics
Competition	FC	LA	T20
Matches	88	103	55
Runs scored	3,321	1,788	588
Batting average	25.54	24.16	15.89
100s/50s	3/16	0/9	0/1
Top score	150*	99*	52*
Balls bowled	3,296	1,885	338
Wickets	50	42	15
Bowling average	39.24	37.21	28.86
5 wickets in innings	1	0	1
10 wickets in match	0	0	0
Best bowling	5/103	4/38	5/13
Catches/stumpings	45/–	31/–	12/–
- Source: ESPNcricinfo, 19 April 2025

Nicolaas Reimert Petrus Scholtz (born November 5, 1986) is a Namibian cricketer. He is a left-handed batsman and a leg-break bowler. He represented the Namibian cricket team in five Youth One-Day Internationals during the Under-19s World Cup of 2006.

Scholtz tends to occupy a mid-range position in the batting lineup. In 2007, he hit a career-best 64 in the ICC Continental Cup against Canada.
