= Muhammad Ghous =

American cricketer of Pakistani origin

Muhammad Asad Ghous (born April 14, 1990) is an American cricketer of Pakistani origin who plays for the United States national cricket team. Ghous was part of the US team at the 2012 ICC World Twenty20 Qualifier in the UAE in March 2012. In June 2021, he was selected for the Minor League Cricket tournament in the United States following the players' draft.
