= List of Suriname Twenty20 International cricketers =

This is a list of Suriname Twenty20 International cricketers.

In April 2018, the ICC decided to grant full Twenty20 International (T20I) status to all its members. Therefore, all Twenty20 matches played between Suriname and other ICC members after 1 January 2019 will have T20I status.

This list will comprise all members of the Suriname cricket team who have played at least one T20I match. It is initially arranged in the order in which each player won his first Twenty20 cap. Where more than one player will win his first Twenty20 cap in the same match, those players will be listed alphabetically by surname (according to the name format used by Cricinfo).

Suriname played their first match with T20I status on 6 December 2024 against Panama during the 2024 Men's T20 World Cup Americas Sub-regional Qualifier.

== Key ==
General

- ‡ – Captain
- † – Wicket-keeper
- First – Year of debut
- Last – Year of latest game
- Mat – Number of matches played

Batting

- Runs – Runs scored in career
- HS – Highest score
- Avg – Runs scored per dismissal
- * – Batsman remained not out
- 50 – Half-centuries scored
- 100 – Centuries scored

Bowling

- Balls – Balls bowled in career
- Wkt – Wickets taken in career
- BBI – Best bowling in an innings
- Ave – Average runs per wicket

Fielding

- Ca – Catches taken
- St – Stumpings affected

== Players ==
Statistics are correct as of 15 March 2026.

Cap	Name	First	Last	Mat	Batting					Bowling				Fielding		Ref(s)
Cap	Name	First	Last	Mat	Runs	HS	Avg	50	100	Balls	Wkt	BBI	Ave	Ca	St	Ref(s)
1	Abdul Bhikari	2024	2026	6	2	1	1.00	0	0	28	3	1/12	17.66	0	0	
2	Yuvraj Dayal	2024	2026	14	136	37*	13.60	0	0	246	9	4/19	31.44	3	0	
3	Troy Dudnath	2024	2026	7	57	18	9.50	0	0	84	5	2/9	17.20	0	0	
4	Arun Gokoel‡	2024	2026	13	66	34*	8.25	0	0	263	15	3/14	18.00	6	0	
5	Vejai Hirlal†	2024	2026	14	130	26	10.83	0	0	–	–	–	–	3	1	
6	Khemraj Jaikaran	2024	2026	14	88	25*	8.00	0	0	84	7	3/22	13.85	3	0	
7	Taarkheswar Ramautar	2024	2024	5	6	2	2.00	0	0	–	–	–	–	0	0	
8	Vishwar Shaw	2024	2026	13	109	26	9.90	0	0	43	3	1/4	13.66	1	0	
9	Gavin Singh	2024	2026	13	219	51*	24.33	1	0	248	11	2/13	20.90	3	0	
10	Vishaul Singh	2024	2024	8	70	30	10.00	0	0	30	2	1/16	21.00	3	0	
11	Xaviee Smith	2024	2026	14	190	57*	19.00	1	0	288	20	4/18	11.50	4	0	
12	Kemraj Hardat	2024	2024	7	50	26	8.33	0	0	–	–	–	–	1	2	
13	Giovani Gokoel	2024	2024	5	11	9	11.00	0	0	24	0	–	–	2	0	
14	Romario Ramjiawan	2024	2024	2	4	4	4.00	0	0	–	–	–	–	1	0	
15	Somnath Bharatt	2026	2026	6	62	28	12.40	0	0	–	–	–	–	3	0	
16	Joseph Perry†	2026	2026	6	19	18	9.50	0	0	12	0	–	–	2	2	
17	Kishan Singh	2026	2026	5	10	10*	–	0	0	60	2	1/19	39.00	0	0	
18	Kishan Singh	2026	2026	2	–	–	–	–	–	–	–	–	–	0	0	
