= Muneshwar Patandin =

Guyanese cricketer (born 1989)

Personal information
- Born: 24 January 1989 (age 37); Georgetown, Guyana

International information
- National side: Suriname
- Source: Cricinfo, 7 September 2015

Muneshwar Patandin (born 24 January 1989) is a Guyanese cricketer who represented Suriname at the international level. He played in the 2015 ICC World Cricket League Division Six tournament, which Suriname won, with Patandin finishing as the leading wicket-taker. Suriname were promoted to 2016 ICC World Cricket League Division Five, but later withdrew due to an ICC investigation into the eligibility of some of the players, Patandin being one of the players in question.
