= Mukesh Narula =

Indian cricketer (born 1962)

Personal information
- Full name: Mukesh Shamsunder Narula
- Born: 2 September 1962 (age 64); Delhi, India
- Batting: Right-handed
- Bowling: Right-arm medium
- Role: All-rounder

Domestic team information
- Years: Team
- 1985–1996: Baroda
- 1989–1994: West Zone

Head coaching information
- Years: Team
- 2014–2015: Canada

Career statistics
Competition	FC	LA
Matches	57	19
Runs scored	2,373	138
Batting average	33.42	17.25
100s/50s	5/9	0/0
Top score	176	27*
Balls bowled	6,944	910
Wickets	104	27
Bowling average	32.47	25.07
5 wickets in innings	6	0
10 wickets in match	0	0
Best bowling	6/80	3/37
Catches/stumpings	32/-	3/-
- Source: CricketArchive, 25 April 2015

Mukesh Shamsunder Narula (born 2 September 1962) is an Indian cricket coach and former player. His domestic career as an all-rounder for Baroda spanned from 1985 to 1996, and included a number of matches for West Zone in the Duleep and Deodhar Trophies. He was the head coach of Canada from 2014 to 2015.

== Playing career ==
Although born in Delhi, Narula was raised in Vadodara, and played all his representative cricket for Baroda teams. During his time at the University of Baroda, where he graduated in 1984, he played regularly in inter-university matches. Narula made his Ranji Trophy debut for Baroda's senior side during the 1985–86 season, and in his fourth and final match, against Saurashtra in January 1986, scored a maiden first-class century, an even 100 not out. Coming in seventh in the batting order, he put on 161 runs for the sixth wicket with Sanjay Hazare, which as of April 2015 remains a record for Baroda–Saurashtra matches. Narula scored another century, 105, in the following season's Ranji Trophy fixture against Saurashtra, and his 209-run fifth-wicket partnership with Tushar Arothe set another record for Baroda–Saurashtra matches. That was his only century of the 1986–87 season, and he similarly scored just a single century during the 1987–88 season, 102 against Gujarat.

A right-arm medium pacer, Narula rarely bowled early in his career, taking only five wickets in his first four Ranji Trophy seasons (and two wickets in an innings only once). However, during the 1989–90 season Narula's six Ranji matches yielded 15 wickets, taken at an average of 27.26. He was Baroda's leading wicket-taker, with only Shaukat Dukanwala, a future United Arab Emirates ODI player, bowling more overs. Against Bombay, Narula took a maiden five-wicket haul, 5/75, opening the bowling with ex-Test player Rashid Patel. Although in the same match he was out for a duck, in the previous game against Maharashtra he had made what was to be the highest score of his career, an innings of 176 runs made over exactly six hours at the crease. At the time, Narula's innings was the highest by a Baroda number-six batsman, though it was surpassed by Kiran More's 180 during the 1996–97 season.

Narula's Ranji Trophy performances during the 1989–90 season secured a maiden Duleep Trophy appearance. Appearing for West Zone against South Zone at Bangalore's M. Chinnaswamy Stadium, he made little impact on the game, which saw South Zone compile 665 and West Zone all out for 465. Narula again appeared for West Zone the following season, though in the limited-overs Deodhar Trophy rather than in the Duleep Trophy. He began the tournament with 3/37 from nine overs in the quarter-final against Central Zone, took another wicket in the semi-final against North Zone, and then finished with 3/57 in the final against East Zone, including the final wicket of the match to secure West Zone's victory. His most notable wicket in the final was that of future India captain Sourav Ganguly, who he had caught for 125, while his West Zone teammates had included Ravi Shastri, Sanjay Manjrekar, Dilip Vengsarkar, Sachin Tendulkar, and Vinod Kambli.

Narula was one of Baroda's strongest bowlers during the early 1990s, with 20 wickets during the 1992–93 season and 17 during both the 1991–92 and 1993–94 seasons. His most notable bowling performance during this time was 5/48 for West Zone in the final of the 1991–92 Duleep Trophy, though this was not enough to prevent his team losing the game by 236 runs. Later seasons saw returns of 6/92 (against Saurashtra in 1992–93), 6/101 (against Maharashtra in 1993–94), and 6/80 (against Saurashtra in 1994–95), with the last performance being a career best. Narula's 1993–94 season yielded 320 runs from a combined eight Ranji and Duleep Trophy matches. Although he averaged 40.00 for the season, his only score over 50 came in the Ranji quarter-final against Punjab, an innings of 131 from 343 balls that was made from eighth in the batting order and lasted almost seven hours. Narula's final first-class appearance was a one-off game for Baroda during the 1996–97 season, by which time he was 34. He finished his career with 2,373 runs and 104 wickets from 57 first-class games. During the Indian off-season, Narula had played several seasons of club cricket in Northern Ireland, appearing as a professional for the Drummond Cricket Club.

In February 2020, he was named in Canada's squad for the Over-50s Cricket World Cup in South Africa. However, the tournament was cancelled during the third round of matches due to the coronavirus pandemic.

== Coaching career ==
Having worked in management positions with Indian Petrochemicals Corporation Limited (IPCL) outside of cricket, Narula's first major coaching role came when he was appointed coach of the Baroda under-19 side for the 2007–08 season. Baroda won the Cooch Behar Trophy (the under-19 equivalent of the Ranji Trophy) for the first time during that season, and he subsequently secured a role as batting consultant with the Mumbai Indians for the 2009 IPL season. Following the resignation of Paras Mhambrey in January 2010, Narula (previously an assistant to Mhambrey) was appointed senior coach of Baroda for the remainder of the 2009–10 season. He was re-appointed senior coach for the 2010–11 season, also coaching West Zone during the same season, and led Baroda to the final against Rajasthan, its best finish since the 2001–02 season. Despite his team's performance, Narula resigned as coach at the end of the season to take up a position at a Toronto cricket academy. The coach of the Canadian under-19 team at the 2011 Under-19 World Cup Qualifier in Ireland, Narula was appointed head coach of the senior Canadian national team in August 2014. He was the first full-time coach since the resignation of Gus Logie in December 2013.

Sporting positions
Preceded by Gus Logie	Coach of Canada; August 2014 –	Incumbent
