= Arnold Manders =

Bermudian cricketer (born 1959)

Personal information
- Full name: Willard Arnold E Manders
- Born: 26 April 1959 (age 67); Bermuda
- Batting: Right-handed
- Bowling: Right-arm off break

International information
- National side: Bermuda

Domestic team information
- Years: Team
- 1996/97: Bermuda

Career statistics
Competition	List A
Matches	6
Runs scored	45
Batting average	9.00
100s/50s	–/–
Top score	23
Balls bowled	293
Wickets	3
Bowling average	74.66
5 wickets in innings	–
10 wickets in match	–
Best bowling	2/34
Catches/stumpings	–/–
- Source: CricketArchive, 13 October 2011

Willard Arnold E Manders (born 26 April 1959 in Bermuda and usually known as Arnold) is a former Bermudian cricketer. He was a right-handed batsman and a right-arm off-break bowler. He played six List A matches for Bermuda as part of the 1996 Red Stripe Bowl and also played in four ICC Trophy tournaments.
