= Fahad Babar =

American cricketer (born 1992)

Personal information
- Born: 19 February 1992 (age 34); Karachi, Pakistan
- Batting: Right-handed
- Bowling: Right-arm off break
- Role: Batsman
- Source: Cricinfo, 27 July 2020

Fahad Babar (born 19 February 1992 in Karachi, Pakistan) is an American cricketer. Babar has played two Twenty20s for the USA cricket team after qualifying to play for the United States because of the International Cricket Council's (ICC) seven-year residency rule. He briefly succeeded Steve Massiah as USA captain in 2013.

He made his List A debut for ICC Americas in the 2016–17 Regional Super50 on 30 January 2017. In June 2021, he was selected to play in the Minor League Cricket tournament in the United States following the players' draft.
