= Jason Anderson (cricketer) =

Bermudian cricketer

Personal information
- Full name: Jason Anderson
- Born: 17 February 1979 (age 47); Bermuda
- Batting: Right-handed
- Role: Wicket-keeper

International information
- National side: Bermuda (2010–2013)

Career statistics
Competition	LA	T20
Matches	5	9
Runs scored	176	1
Batting average	44.00	0.33
100s/50s	1/0	0/0
Top score	106*	1*
Catches/stumpings	4/1	2/1
- Source: Cricinfo, 19 February 2012

Jason Anderson (born 17 February 1979) is a former Bermudian cricketer. A right-handed wicket-keeper/batsman, Anderson represented the Bermudian national side between 2010 and 2013, most notably at the 2011 World Cricket League Division Two tournament and the 2012 World Twenty20 Qualifier.

Having earlier played for the national under-19 team, Anderson made his senior debut for Bermuda in September 2010, at a cricket festival in Canada. He went on to make his list-A debut in April 2011, against Papua New Guinea at the WCL Division Two tournament in the United Arab Emirates. Anderson finished the tournament with 176 runs from his five matches, made at an average of 44.00, which was behind only Dion Stovell and Lionel Cann for Bermuda. His highest score of the tournament was an innings of 106 not out against Hong Kong, which earned him the man of the match award.

In March 2012, Anderson was selected as the only wicket-keeper in Bermuda's squad for the 2012 World Twenty20 Qualifier. He went on to play every match of the tournament, but scored only a single run from his five innings, consequently finishing his Twenty20 career with an average of only 0.33. Anderson's final international tournament was the 2013 WCL Division Three event, which Bermuda hosted. Aged 34 at the time of his last international, he continued to play club cricket for several more seasons, representing Cleveland County Cricket Club. However, in September 2015, Anderson was involved in an on-field altercation that resulted in him being banned for life from Bermudian cricket. Playing in a league final against Willow Cuts Cricket Club, he struck an opposing batsman, George O'Brien, in the head, which provoked a brawl featuring both teams and several spectators. The Bermuda Cricket Board subsequently found Anderson guilty of a level-four violation of the code of conduct for players, with a life ban being the consequence.
