= List of VFL debuts in 1922 =

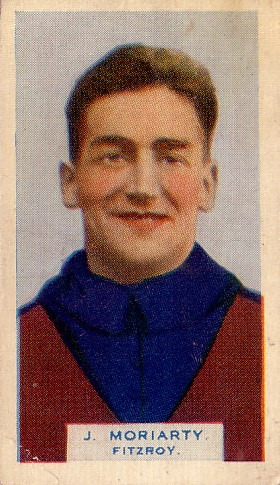
Jack Moriarty made his VFL debut in 1922

The 1922 Victorian Football League (VFL) season was the 26th season of the VFL. The season saw 95 Australian rules footballers make their senior VFL debut and a further 12 players transfer to new clubs having previously played in the VFL.

== Summary ==
Summary of debuts in 1922
Club	VFL debuts	Change of club
Carlton	11	1
Collingwood	13	2
Essendon	8	3
Fitzroy	9	-
Geelong	9	1
Melbourne	8	1
Richmond	11	1
South Melbourne	14	2
St Kilda	12	1
Total	95	12

== Debuts by clubs ==
Name	Club	Age at debut	Round debuted	Games	Goals	Notes
Johnny Davies	Carlton	22 years, 140 days	8	32	7	
Jimmy Goonan	Carlton	25 years, 128 days	7	22	1	
Frank Pritchard	Carlton	22 years, 362 days	5	20	11	
George Bolt	Carlton	22 years, 278 days	1	18	1	
Joe Russell	Carlton	24 years, 120 days	10	16	2	
Leo Credlin	Carlton	19 years, 64 days	14	16	18	
Jim Fraser	Carlton	25 years, 136 days	1	14	13	
Alec Farrow	Carlton	28 years, 122 days	6	14	14	Previously played for Melbourne.
Ernie Dingwall	Carlton	23 years, 257 days	2	8	1	
Eric Humphrey	Carlton	21 years, 195 days	5	4	1	
Charlie Greenhill	Carlton	20 years, 65 days	4	3	0	
Graham Kemp	Carlton	27 years, 89 days	12	1	0	
Syd Coventry	Collingwood	22 years, 327 days	1	227	62	Brother of Gordon Coventry and father of Hugh and Syd Coventry, Jr.
Harry Chesswas	Collingwood	21 years, 62 days	14	154	45	
Leo Wescott	Collingwood	21 years, 302 days	1	143	3	
Reg Baker	Collingwood	22 years, 314 days	12	60	60	
Edward Baker	Collingwood	21 years, 105 days	1	43	33	Previously played for Carlton.
Eric Cock	Collingwood	19 years, 324 days	3	36	40	
Rupe Hannah	Collingwood	21 years, 336 days	9	14	0	
Hector Lingwood-Smith	Collingwood	22 years, 61 days	11	13	1	
Bill Glynn	Collingwood	21 years, 301 days	1	9	4	
Clyde Smith	Collingwood	21 years, 98 days	1	6	0	
Fred Keays	Collingwood	23 years, 305 days	2	3	0	Previously played for Fitzroy.
George Tory	Collingwood	22 years, 337 days	1	2	1	
Clem Splatt	Collingwood	22 years, 238 days	2	2	0	
Frank Plant	Collingwood	21 years, 234 days	1	1	0	
Charles Wall	Collingwood	26 years, 319 days	1	1	0	
Rowley Watt	Essendon	23 years, 307 days	3	141	41	
Charlie May	Essendon	23 years, 78 days	1	84	3	
Justin McCarthy	Essendon	27 years, 247 days	4	56	60	Previously played for Carlton.
Ken Adam	Essendon	21 years, 268 days	1	31	0	
Joe Callahan	Essendon	24 years, 153 days	11	27	11	
Jack Moriarty	Essendon	21 years, 6 days	1	13	36	Son of Geoff Moriarty.
Roy Kemp	Essendon	26 years, 183 days	1	12	4	
Clarrie Clowe	Essendon	29 years, 166 days	10	5	1	Previously played for Carlton.
Ralph Raisbeck	Essendon	23 years, 209 days	11	3	0	
Gilbert Wardley	Essendon	27 years, 27 days	3	1	0	
Enos Thomas	Essendon	29 years, 9 days	12	1	0	Previously played for Melbourne.
Norm Cockram	Fitzroy	22 years, 252 days	1	120	82	
Tommy Corrigan	Fitzroy	19 years, 71 days	1	107	13	
Goldie Collins	Fitzroy	20 years, 239 days	2	64	9	Brother of Harry and Norm Collins.
Les Warren	Fitzroy	25 years, 282 days	9	40	0	
Steve Donnellan	Fitzroy	21 years, 175 days	1	27	12	
Hector McNeil	Fitzroy	20 years, 179 days	1	7	2	
John Hamilton	Fitzroy	31 years, 163 days	9	7	3	
Percy Chalmers	Fitzroy	26 years, 58 days	2	1	0	
Alwin Dalitz	Fitzroy	28 years, 121 days	18	1	0	
George Todd	Geelong	19 years, 158 days	7	232	54	
Arthur Coghlan	Geelong	19 years, 270 days	2	145	10	
Eric Fleming	Geelong	19 years, 58 days	2	105	112	
Edward Stevenson	Geelong	21 years, 46 days	4	105	30	
Syd Hall	Geelong	20 years, 93 days	17	85	18	
Charlie Plane	Geelong	26 years, 54 days	2	42	5	
Bill Hudd	Geelong	20 years, 285 days	17	28	5	
Val Marchesi	Geelong	22 years, 75 days	3	15	4	
Alby Bendle	Geelong	28 years, 195 days	2	13	1	
Harry Smith	Geelong	29 years, 70 days	6	3	2	Previously played for Fitzroy.
Richard Taylor	Melbourne	20 years, 292 days	18	164	100	
Hugh Dunbar	Melbourne	18 years, 313 days	1	97	48	Brother of Edgar and Harold Dunbar.
Edgar Dunbar	Melbourne	20 years, 24 days	1	28	5	Brother of Harold and Hugh Dunbar.
Vern Moore	Melbourne	27 years, 72 days	11	14	8	
Eric Peck	Melbourne	22 years, 327 days	8	6	0	Previously played for Geelong.
Harold Dunbar	Melbourne	22 years, 117 days	1	5	2	Brother of Edgar and Hugh Dunbar.
Alf Oldham	Melbourne	22 years, 202 days	1	3	2	
Artie Cambridge	Melbourne	20 years, 181 days	8	2	0	
John Corby	Melbourne	23 years, 164 days	6	1	1	
Doug Hayes	Richmond	25 years, 267 days	6	82	62	
George Rudolph	Richmond	21 years, 28 days	3	80	61	
Angus MacIsaac	Richmond	22 years, 70 days	8	59	20	
Dave Lynch	Richmond	20 years, 110 days	9	20	77	
Matt Connors	Richmond	24 years, 248 days	6	6	3	Previously played for Melbourne.
Arthur Birtles	Richmond	22 years, 331 days	7	5	5	
Rupert Gibb	Richmond	22 years, 1 days	15	4	0	
Billy Wright	Richmond	22 years, 18 days	16	3	0	
Rob Brady	Richmond	21 years, 45 days	9	2	0	
George Clark	Richmond	24 years, 14 days	18	1	0	
Ray Ross	Richmond	19 years, 145 days	18	1	1	
Bob Stewart	Richmond	19 years, 108 days	18	1	0	
Horrie Mason	St Kilda	19 years, 20 days	3	137	76	
Cyril Gambetta	St Kilda	22 years, 278 days	1	129	75	
Ed Sanneman	St Kilda	19 years, 346 days	5	72	25	
Wal Gunnyon	St Kilda	27 years, 25 days	6	63	21	
Aubrey MacKenzie	St Kilda	27 years, 195 days	1	35	8	Previously played for Melbourne.
Les Reynolds	St Kilda	23 years, 42 days	10	30	11	Uncle of Dick Reynolds.
Horrie Bannister	St Kilda	21 years, 350 days	3	17	4	
Bill Tymms	St Kilda	18 years, 263 days	1	8	5	
Les Morrison	St Kilda	27 years, 115 days	3	8	0	
Bill Ward	St Kilda	21 years, 72 days	6	7	4	
Orville Lamplough	St Kilda	25 years, 173 days	16	7	6	
Bert Officer	St Kilda	22 years, 221 days	8	6	10	
Stan Cooper	St Kilda	25 years, 190 days	3	2	0	
Harold Alexander	South Melbourne	20 years, 29 days	3	70	40	
Arthur Hando	South Melbourne	30 years, 362 days	5	45	0	
Jack O'Connell	South Melbourne	19 years, 336 days	7	42	4	
Frank Ross	South Melbourne	21 years, 308 days	1	32	2	
Wal Matthews	South Melbourne	28 years, 8 days	3	22	7	
Roy Bence	South Melbourne	22 years, 42 days	2	15	6	
Bill Gunn	South Melbourne	22 years, 359 days	1	10	1	
Basil Smith	South Melbourne	20 years, 157 days	4	6	5	Previously played for Collingwood.
Sid Conlon	South Melbourne	23 years, 209 days	1	4	3	
Billy Gambetta	South Melbourne	25 years, 30 days	1	4	7	
Bill Peters	South Melbourne	24 years, 41 days	1	4	0	
Tommy Law	South Melbourne	27 years, 59 days	1	2	1	
Jim Cullum	South Melbourne	24 years, 48 days	4	2	0	
Maurie Connell	South Melbourne	20 years, 65 days	2	1	0	
Clarrie Woodfield	South Melbourne	21 years, 34 days	2	1	0	Previously played for Essendon.
Don Templeton	South Melbourne	20 years, 313 days	8	1	0	
