= Lamplough =

Lamplough is a surname. Notable people with the surname include:

- Augustus Osborne Lamplough (1877–1930), English painter and illustrator
- Giacomo Lamplough (born 1997), Hong Kong cricketer
- Orville Lamplough (1897–1968), Australian rules footballer
- Robert Lamplough (born 1940), English aviator and racing driver
- Walter Lamplough (1866–1918), South African cricketer
- William Lamplough (1914–1996), English teacher and archaeologist

== See also ==
- Lamplough, Victoria
