= Charles Wall =

Charles Wall may refer to:

- Charles Wall (historian) (1903–1995), American historian and preservationist
- Charles Wall (footballer) (1895–1965), Australian rules footballer
- Charles Wall (US official), American government official, deputy director of U.S. Immigration and Customs Enforcement
- Charles Baring Wall (1795–1853), British member of parliament
- Charlie Wall (1880–1955), American businessman, mobster, and political figure
