= Les Warren =

Les Warren may refer to:

- Les Warren (footballer)
- Les Warren (politician)
