= 2015 World Twenty20 Qualifier =

Cricket tournament

2015 ICC World Twenty20 Qualifier
- Dates: 6 July 2015 – 26 July 2015
- Administrator: International Cricket Council
- Cricket format: Twenty20 International, Twenty20
- Tournament format(s): Round-robin, Playoffs
- Host(s): Ireland; Scotland
- Champions: Netherlands (2nd title); Scotland (1st title) (shared)
- Participants: 14
- Matches: 51
- Player of the series: (Namibia) Bernard Scholtz
- Most runs: (Namibia) Stephan Baard (309)
- Most wickets: (Ireland) John Mooney (14) (Namibia) Bernard Scholtz (14) (Scotland) Alasdair Evans (14)

The 2015 ICC World Twenty20 Qualifier, for the 2016 World Twenty20, was held from 6 to 26 July 2015. The tournament was hosted by both Ireland and Scotland. 51 matches were played among 14 nations, down from 72 matches among 16 nations in the previous edition. The tournament formed part of the ICC World Twenty20 Qualifier series, with the top six teams going forward to the qualifying round of the 2016 ICC World Twenty20 tournament.

Matches where both teams had T20I status were recorded as a Twenty20 International match. The teams in this tournament with this status were Scotland, Ireland, Netherlands, Afghanistan, United Arab Emirates, Hong Kong, Nepal and Papua New Guinea. Matches which featured one or two teams without T20I status were recorded as a Twenty20 match.

Scotland were the first team to qualify for the 2016 ICC World Twenty20 tournament by finishing top of Group B. Co-hosts Ireland joined them by finishing top of Group A. Joining the two group winners through the qualifier matches were the Netherlands, Afghanistan Hong Kong, and Oman. It was the first time that Oman qualified for a major ICC event and with their win over Namibia, they gained T20I status. The UAE and Nepal who made their debut in the 2014 ICC World Twenty20 did not qualify, however the UAE did play in the 2016 Asia Cup which for the first time was played in a Twenty20 format.

Scotland and the Netherlands shared the trophy after the final was abandoned without a ball being bowled due to rain. The Netherlands were the only associate nation to advance past the group stage in the 2014 ICC World Twenty20 tournament.

== Teams ==
Team	Qualification tournament	Standing	Region
Ireland	2013 ICC World Twenty20 Qualifier; Tournament co-host	Winner	Europe
Afghanistan	2013 ICC World Twenty20 Qualifier	Runner-up	Asia
Nepal	2013 ICC World Twenty20 Qualifier	Third	Asia
UAE	2013 ICC World Twenty20 Qualifier	Fourth	Asia
Netherlands	2013 ICC World Twenty20 Qualifier	Fifth	Europe
Hong Kong	2013 ICC World Twenty20 Qualifier	Sixth	Asia
Scotland	Tournament co-host		Europe
Namibia	2015 ICC Africa Twenty20 Championship	Winner	Africa
Kenya	2015 ICC Africa Twenty20 Championship	Runner-up	Africa
Canada	2015 ICC Americas Twenty20 Division One	Winner	Americas
USA	2015 ICC Americas Twenty20 Division One	Runner-up	Americas
Oman	2015 ACC Twenty20 Cup	Winner	Asia
PNG	2014 ICC East Asia-Pacific Men's Championship	Winner	East Asia Pacific
Jersey	2015 ICC Europe Division One	Winner	Europe

== Format ==
From the 14 teams, the top 6 qualifiers will progress to the first (qualifying) round of the 2016 ICC World Twenty20, where they will meet the ninth and tenth-ranked full members (Bangladesh and Zimbabwe) in the ICC T20I Championship table as on 30 April 2014. The teams for the two groups along with the fixtures were announced on 14 May.

== Squads ==
Afghanistan	Canada	Hong Kong	Ireland	Jersey
Asghar Stanikzai (c); Javed Ahmadi; Aftab Alam; Mirwais Ashraf; Sharafuddin Ashraf; Hameed Hassan; Nawroz Mangal; Mohammad Nabi; Gulbadin Naib; Shafiqullah; Mohammad Shahzad; Samiullah Shinwari; Dawlat Zadran; Najibullah Zadran; Shapoor Zadran	Rizwan Cheema (c); Navneet Dhaliwal; Satsimranjit Dhindsa; ~~Nikhil Dutta~~; Jeremy Gordon; Ruvindu Gunasekera; Hamza Tariq; Jimmy Hansra; Junaid Siddiqui; Shaheed Keshvani; Khurram Chohan; Nitish Kumar; Hiral Patel; Cecil Pervez; Saad Bin Zafar; Srimantha Wijeratne	Tanwir Afzal (c); Mark Chapman (vc); Aizaz Khan; Anas Khan; Anshuman Rath; Babar Hayat; Ehsan Nawaz; Haseeb Amjad; Irfan Ahmed; James Atkinson; Kinchit Shah; Nadeem Ahmed; Nizakat Khan; ~~Waqas Barkat~~; Waqas Khan; Giacomo Lamplough	William Porterfield (c); Andrew Balbirnie; Alex Cusack; George Dockrell; Tyrone Kane; Andrew McBrine; Graeme McCarter; John Mooney; Niall O'Brien; Kevin O'Brien; Stuart Poynter; Paul Stirling; Stuart Thompson; Gary Wilson; Craig Young	Peter Gough (c); Corey Bisson; Dominic Blampied; Corne Bodenstein; Paul Connolly; Edward Farley; Anthony Hawkins-Kay; Jonty Jenner; Ben Kynman; Tom Minty; Charles Perchard; Rhys Palmer; Callum Rabet; Ben Stevens; Nat Watkins
Kenya	Namibia	Nepal	Netherlands	Oman
Rakep Patel (c); Gurdeep Singh; Narendra Kalyan; Irfan Karim; Karan Kaul; Lucas Ndandason; James Ngoche; Shem Ngoche; Collins Obuya; Eugene Ochieng; Nelson Odhiambo; Nehemiah Odhiambo; Elijah Otieno; Morris Ouma; Emmanuel Bundi	Nicolaas Scholtz (c); Stephan Baard; Sarel Burger; Christopher Coombe; Jason Davidson; Michau du Preez; Gerhard Erasmus; ~~Zhivago Groenewald~~; Louis Klazinga; JP Kotze; Bernard Scholtz; JJ Smit; Christiaan Snyman; Gerrie Snyman; Raymond van Schoor; Craig Williams	Paras Khadka (c); Gyanendra Malla (vc); Pradeep Airee; Binod Bhandari; Shakti Gauchan; Sompal Kami; Karan KC; Subash Khakurel; Siddhant Lohani; Anil Mandal; Jitendra Mukhiya; Rajesh Pulami; Sagar Pun; Basanta Regmi; Sharad Vesawkar	Peter Borren (c); Wesley Barresi (vc); Rahil Ahmed; Mudassar Bukhari; Ben Cooper; Ahsan Malik; ~~Vivian Kingma~~; Stephan Myburgh; Max O'Dowd; Michael Rippon; Pieter Seelaar; Michael Swart; Timm van der Gugten; Paul van Meekeren; Roelof van der Merwe; Thijs van Schelven	Sultan Ahmed (c); Aamir Kaleem; Aamer Ali; Munis Ansari; Jatinder Singh; ~~Khawar Ali~~; Ajay Lalcheta; Mehran Khan; Mohammad Nadeem; Arun Poulose; Rajesh Ranpura; Sufyan Mehmood; Vaibhav Wategaonkar; Yousuf Mahmood; Zeeshan Maqsood; Zeeshan Siddiqui
Papua New Guinea	Scotland	United Arab Emirates	United States	
Jack Vare (c); Charles Amini; Sese Bau; Mahuru Dai; Willie Gavera; Vani Morea; Loa Nou; Kila Pala; Pipi Raho; John Reva; Lega Siaka; Chad Soper; Tony Ura; Assad Vala; Norman Vanua	Preston Mommsen (c); Richie Berrington; Kyle Coetzer; ~~Freddie Coleman~~; Matthew Cross; Josh Davey; Con de Lange; Alasdair Evans; Michael Leask; Calum MacLeod; Gavin Main; George Munsey; Safyaan Sharif; Robert Taylor; Craig Wallace; Mark Watt	Mohammad Tauqir (c); Abdul Shakoor; Ahmed Raza; Amjad Ali; Amjad Javed; Faizan Asif; Fayyaz Ahmed; Manjula Guruge; Mohammad Naveed; Mohammad Shahzad; Nasir Aziz; Swapnil Patil; Saqib Ali; Shaiman Anwar; Umair Ali	Muhammad Ghous (c); Alex Amsterdam; Fahad Babar; Adil Bhatti; Akeem Dodson; Karan Ganesh; Naseer Jamali; Japen Patel; Mrunal Patel; Timil Patel; Hammad Shahid; Jasdeep Singh; Nicholas Standford; Timothy Surujbally; ~~Steven Taylor~~; Shiva Vashishat	

Scotland's Kyle Coetzer was not originally included in the 15-man squad, but was added on 10 June after Freddie Coleman withdrew due to personal circumstances. America's Steven Taylor withdrew from the squad on 22 June after securing a contract with Barbados Tridents in the Caribbean Premier League (CPL). He was replaced by Timothy Surujbally. On 2 July Hong Kong's Waqas Barkat was replaced by Giacomo Lamplough after Barkat was ruled out due to visa issues. Canada's Nikhil Dutta chose to stay with the St Kitts and Nevis Patriots in the CPL and was replaced by Hiral Patel. South African born Roelof van der Merwe obtained a Dutch passport a month before the tournament started and was selected over Vivian Kingma. Namibia's Zhivago Groenewald was replaced by Michau du Preez. Oman's Khawar Ali returned home for personal reasons midway through the tournament, and was replaced by Arun Poulose in their squad. However, Ali returned for the 5th place play-off match against Afghanistan, and in turn made his T20I debut.

Dutch bowler Ahsan Malik was reported for bowling with an illegal action following the Netherlands win over Scotland on 11 July. He was not allowed to take any further part in the tournament, until an independent assessment has taken place. Kenyan bowler James Ngoche was also suspended for bowling with an illegal action. This was following Kenya's match with Oman on 11 July. Along with Malik, Ngoche undertook an independent assessment. Hong Kong spin bowler Nizakat Khan was suspended for bowling with an illegal action, following Hong Kong's match against Nepal on 15 July. He too underwent an independent assessment. On 23 July Namibia's Jason Davidson was suspended for using an illegal action in their match against the Netherlands. He also underwent an assessment on his bowling.

== Venues ==
Venues in the island of Ireland. This includes the Republic of Ireland and Northern Ireland	Venues in Scotland

Venue	City	Country (Note: The term country, in this instance is used to mean the governing body that administers the sport of cricket in that location and is a member of the International Cricket Council. The Irish cricket team, which is administered by Cricket Ireland, represents the whole of the island of Ireland, which includes both the Republic of Ireland and Northern Ireland. Both Stormont and Bready Cricket Club Ground, while geographically located in Northern Ireland, fall under the auspices of Cricket Ireland. In addition, while Scotland is not its own country as it is a constituent country of the United Kingdom, Scotland does have its own team, which is administered by Cricket Scotland.)	Capacity	Matches
Stormont	Belfast	Ireland	7,000	8
Bready Cricket Club Ground	Magheramason	Ireland	Unknown	4
Malahide Cricket Club Ground	Dublin	Ireland	11,500	14 (Note: This figure includes all the qualifiers, both semi-finals, the 3rd place playoff, and the final.)
Clontarf Cricket Club Ground	Dublin	Ireland	3,200	4 (Note: This figure includes 5th place playoff.)
Grange Cricket Club Ground	Edinburgh	Scotland	3,000	7
Myreside Cricket Ground	Edinburgh	Scotland	Unknown	4
New Williamfield	Stirling	Scotland	Unknown	5
Goldenacre	Edinburgh	Scotland	Unknown	5

== Warm-up matches ==
Warm-up matches

6 July
10:00
Scorecard

Oman; 115/4 (16.3 overs)	v	Nepal; 6/0 (0.3 overs)
Zeeshan Maqsood 44 (31); Gyanendra Malla 1/8 (1.3 overs)		Subash Khakurel 5* (2)

No result
Stormont, Belfast
Umpires: Anil Chaudhary (Ind) and Mark Hawthorne (Ire)

- Nepal won the toss and elected to field.

6 July
10:00
Scorecard

Kenya; 141/8 (20 overs)	v	Papua New Guinea; 45/2 (5 overs)
Shem Ngoche 24 (19); Mahuru Dai 2/23 (3 overs)		Lega Siaka 18 (13); Shem Ngoche 1/8 (1 over)

Papua New Guinea won by 10 runs (DLS method)
Bready Cricket Club Ground, County Tyrone
Umpires: Ruchira Palliyaguruge (SL) and Paul Wilson (Aus)

- Papua New Guinea won the toss and elected to field.

6 July
10:00
Scorecard

Namibia; 127/8 (19.3 overs)	v	Scotland; 130/4 (16.2 overs)
Raymond van Schoor 42 (34); Gavin Main 2/9 (2 overs)		Richie Berrington 61 (35); Louis Klazinga 2/23 (2.2 overs)

Scotland won by 6 wickets
Grange Cricket Club Ground, Edinburgh
Umpires: Gregory Brathwaite (WI) and Ian Ramage (Sco)

- Namibia won the toss and elected to bat.

6 July
10:00
Scorecard

Hong Kong; 113/9 (20 overs)	v	Netherlands; 104 (19.2 overs)
Babar Hayat 42 (35); Ahsan Malik 3/24 (4 overs)		Peter Borren 22 (27); Anas Khan 3/11 (4 overs)

Hong Kong won by 9 runs
Myreside Cricket Ground, Edinburgh
Umpires: Nigel Llong (Eng) and David Odhiambo (Ken)

- Hong Kong won the toss and elected to bat.

6 July
14:15
Scorecard

Ireland	v	United Arab Emirates

Match abandoned
Stormont, Belfast
Umpires: Anil Chaudhary (Ind) and Tim Robinson (Eng)

- No toss.
- Match abandoned without a ball bowled.

6 July
14:15
Scorecard

North West Warriors; 119/9 (15 overs)	v	United States; 120/5 (15 overs)
Oraine Williams 47 (35); Timil Patel 4/19 (3 overs)		Shiva Vashishat 30 (35); Ross Allen 2/19 (3 overs)

United States of America won by 5 wickets
Bready Cricket Club Ground, County Tyrone
Umpires: Johan Cloete (SA) and Ruchira Palliyaguruge (SL)

- United States of America won the toss and elected to field.
- Match reduced to 15 overs per side.

6 July
14:15
Scorecard

Canada; 146 (20 overs)	v	Western Districts Cricket Union; 147/2 (18.3 overs)
Nitish Kumar 68 (38); Sudesh Fernando 4/25 (3 overs)		Bradley Williams 53* (38); Junaid Siddiqui 1/16 (4 overs)

Western Districts Cricket Union won by 8 wickets
Grange Cricket Club Ground, Edinburgh
Umpires: Ahsan Raza (Pak) and Gregory Brathwaite (WI)

- Canada won the toss and elected to bat.

6 July
14:15
Scorecard

Jersey; 46 (10.2 overs)	v	Afghanistan; 47/2 (7.3 overs)
Peter Gough 12 (12); Mohammad Nabi 3/10 (2 overs)		Nawroz Mangal 16* (18); Anthony Kay 1/12 (2 overs)

Afghanistan won by 8 wickets
Myreside Cricket Ground, Edinburgh
Umpires: Shaun George (SA) and Vineet Kulkarni (Ind)

- Jersey won the toss and elected to bat.

7 July
10:00
Scorecard

Nepal; 85/7 (18 overs)	v	United Arab Emirates; 81/2 (14 overs)
Sharad Vesawkar 38* (37); Manjula Guruge 3/12 (4 overs)		Faizan Asif 24 (21); Jitendra Mukhiya 1/5 (2 overs)

United Arab Emirates won by 20 runs (DLS method)
Stormont, Belfast
Umpires: Mark Hawthorne (Sco) and Tim Robinson (Eng)

- Nepal won the toss and elected to bat.

7 July
10:00
Scorecard

North West Warriors	v	Papua New Guinea

Match abandoned
Bready Cricket Club Ground, County Tyrone
Umpires: Johan Cloete (SA) and Paul Wilson (Aus)

- No toss.
- Match abandoned without a ball bowled.

7 July
10:00
Scorecard

Scotland; 199/5 (20 overs)	v	Jersey; 93/9 (15 overs)
George Munsey 75 (44); Cornelis Bodenstein 1/8 (1 over)		Cornelis Bodenstein 22 (15); Safyaan Sharif 3/20 (3 overs)

Scotland won by 69 runs (DLS method)
Goldenacre, Edinburgh
Umpires: Nigel Llong (Eng) and Ian Ramage (Sco)

- Jersey won the toss and elected to field.

7 July
10:00
Scorecard

Western Districts Cricket Union	v	Netherlands

Match abandoned
New Williamfield, Stirling
Umpires: Shaun George (SA) and David Odhiambo (Ken)

- No toss.
- Match abandoned without a ball bowled.

7 July
14:15
Scorecard

Oman; 91 (18.5 overs)	v	Ireland
Vaibhav Wategaonkar 26 (31); Alex Cusack 3/20 (3.5 overs)

No result
Stormont, Belfast
Umpires: Anil Chaudhary (Ind) and Tim Robinson (Eng)

- Ireland won the toss and elected to field.

7 July
14:15
Scorecard

Kenya	v	United States

Match abandoned
Bready Cricket Club Ground, County Tyrone
Umpires: Ruchira Palliyaguruge (SL) and Paul Wilson (Aus)

- No toss.
- Match abandoned without a ball bowled.

7 July
14:15
Scorecard

Canada; 149/3 (13 overs)	v	Namibia; 75 (11.4 overs)
Rizwan Cheema 98 (36); Jason Davidson 1/28 (3 overs)		Gerrie Snyman 11 (10); Saad Bin Zafar 4/16 (3 overs)

Canada won by 74 runs
Goldenacre, Edinburgh
Umpires: Ahsan Raza (Pak) and Ian Ramage (Sco)

- Canada won the toss and elected to bat.

7 July
14:15
Scorecard

Afghanistan	v	Hong Kong

Match abandoned
New Williamfield, Stirling
Umpires: Vineet Kulkarni (Ind) and David Odhiambo (Ken)

- No toss.
- Match abandoned without a ball bowled.

== Fixtures ==
=== Group A ===
Pos	Team	Pld	W	L	T	NR	Pts	NRR
1	Ireland	6	4	2	0	0	8	1.356
2	Hong Kong	6	3	2	0	1	7	0.614
3	Namibia	6	3	2	0	1	7	0.314
4	Papua New Guinea	6	3	2	0	1	7	0.113
5	United States	6	3	3	0	0	6	−0.321
6	Jersey	6	2	4	0	0	4	−0.523
7	Nepal	6	1	4	0	1	3	−1.499

Advanced to 2016 World Twenty20 and Semifinal 2.
Advanced to Playoffs.

10 July
10:00
Scorecard

Namibia; 124/8 (20 overs)	v	Ireland; 128/3 (17.2 overs)
JJ Smit 21 (16); John Mooney 3/33 (4 overs)		William Porterfield 56* (44); Sarel Burger 1/13 (3 overs)

Ireland won by 7 wickets
Stormont, Belfast
Umpires: Anil Chaudhary (Ind) and Paul Wilson (WI)
Player of the match: John Mooney (Ire)

- Ireland won the toss and elected to field.

10 July
14:15
Scorecard

United States; 121 (20 overs)	v	Nepal; 122/4 (19.4 overs)
Akeem Dodson 39 (33); Shakti Gauchan 3/16 (4 overs)		Gyanendra Malla 52 (43); Jasdeep Singh 2/23 (4 overs)

Nepal won by 6 wickets
Stormont, Belfast
Umpires: Mark Hawthorne (Ire) and Tim Robinson (Eng)
Player of the match: Shakti Gauchan (Nep)

- United States of America won the toss and elected to bat.
- Shiva Vashishat, Hammad Shahid, Jasdeep Singh, Mrunal Patel and Timil Patel (all USA) made their T20 debuts.

11 July
10:00
Scorecard

Hong Kong; 153/6 (20 overs)	v	Jersey; 154/1 (17.2 overs)
Anshuman Rath 43 (44); Ben Stevens 2/22 (3 overs)		Peter Gough 81* (60); Irfan Ahmed 1/26 (4 overs)

Jersey won by 9 wickets
Bready Cricket Club Ground, County Tyrone
Umpires: Johan Cloete (SA) and Mark Hawthorne (Ire)
Player of the match: Peter Gough (Jer)

- Jersey won the toss and elected to field.
- Match start delayed due to rain.
- Corey Bisson, Corne Bodenstein, Edward Farley, Peter Gough, Jonty Jenner, Anthony Hawkins-Kay, Ben Kynman, Rhys Palmer, Charles Perchard, Ben Stevens, Nat Watkins (all Jer) and Anshuman Rath (HK) all made their T20 debuts.
- This was Jersey's first appearance in an ICC World Twenty20 Qualifier tournament and their debut win.

11 July
14:15
Scorecard

Namibia; 61/1 (7.4 overs)	v	Nepal
Stephan Baard 39* (26); Paras Khadka 1/8 (2 overs)

No result
Stormont, Belfast
Umpires: Tim Robinson (Eng) and Paul Wilson (WI)

- Nepal won the toss and elected to field.
- Match was interrupted by rain after 7.0 overs of the 1st innings. (Nam: 54/1); then reduced to 17 overs per side. The game was started, but the match was abandoned after 7.4 overs of play.

12 July
10:00
Scorecard

Ireland; 146/6 (20 overs)	v	United States; 100 (16.3 overs)
Andrew Balbirnie 44 (34); Timil Patel 3/13 (4 overs)		Nicholas Standford 19 (18); John Mooney 2/17 (3 overs)

Ireland won by 46 runs
Stormont, Belfast
Umpires: Anil Chaudhary (Ind) and Tim Robinson (Eng)

- United States of America won the toss and elected to field.
- Alex Amsterdam and Nicholas Standford (both USA) made their T20 debuts.

12 July
10:00
Scorecard

Papua New Guinea; 145/9 (20 overs)	v	Jersey; 121 (19.4 overs)
Assad Vala 29 (27); Anthony Hawkins-Kay 3/24 (4 overs); Ben Stevens 3/24 (4 overs)		Jonty Jenner 44 (29); Norman Vanua 3/19 (4 overs)

Papua New Guinea won by 24 runs
Bready Cricket Club Ground, County Tyrone
Umpires: Mark Hawthorne (Ire) and Ruchira Palliyaguruge (SL)

- Jersey won the toss and elected to field.
- Start delayed due a wet outfield.
- Lega Siaka and Chad Soper (both PNG) made their T20 debuts.

13 July
10:00
Scorecard

United States; 113/8 (20 overs)	v	Namibia; 116/3 (12.5 overs)
Akeem Dodson 49 (41); Bernard Scholtz 2/13 (4 overs)		Gerrie Snyman 62 (35); Timil Patel 2/36 (3.5 overs)

Namibia won by 7 wickets
Stormont, Belfast
Umpires: Johan Cloete (SA) and Ruchira Palliyaguruge (SL)
Player of the match: Gerrie Snyman (Nam)

- Namibia won the toss and elected to field.
- Start delayed due to a wet outfield.
- Naseer Jamali and Timothy Surujbally (both USA) made their T20 debuts.

13 July
10:00
Scorecard

Hong Kong	v	Papua New Guinea

Match abandoned
Bready Cricket Club Ground, County Tyrone
Umpires: Tim Robinson (Eng) and Paul Wilson (Aus)

- No toss.
- Match abandoned without a ball bowled.

13 July
14:15
Scorecard

Nepal; 53 (14.3 overs)	v	Ireland; 54/2 (8 overs)
Sagar Pun 20 (18); Kevin O'Brien 3/8 (4 overs)		Paul Stirling 29 (21); Sompal Kami 2/28 (3 overs)

Ireland won by 8 wickets
Stormont, Belfast
Umpires: Anil Chaudhary (Ind) and Johan Cloete (SA)
Player of the match: Kevin O'Brien (Ire)

- Ireland won the toss and elected to field.
- This is Nepal's lowest total in a T20 match.

15 July
10:00
Scorecard

Ireland; 123/9 (20 overs)	v	Papua New Guinea; 124/8 (18.5 overs)
William Porterfield 57* (58); Willie Gavera 3/17 (4 overs)		Assad Vala 32 (32); Tyrone Kane 3/19 (3 overs)

Papua New Guinea won by 2 wickets
Stormont, Belfast
Umpires: Anil Chaudhary (Ind) and Ruchira Palliyaguruge (SL)
Player of the match: Norman Vanua (PNG)

- Ireland won the toss and elected to bat.
- Charles Amini, Mahuru Dai, Willie Gavera, Loa Nou, Kila Pala, John Reva, Lega Siaka, Tony Ura, Assad Vala, Norman Vanua and Jack Vare (all PNG) made their T20I debuts.
- This defeat for Ireland ended a streak of 21 consecutive wins in ICC World Twenty20 Qualifier matches.

15 July
10:00
Scorecard

Jersey; 87 (17.3 overs)	v	United States; 88/5 (15.4 overs)
Anthony Hawkins-Kay 18 (17); Charles Perchard 18 (17); Naseer Jamali 3/12 (4 overs)		Akeem Dodson 31 (31); Nathaniel Watkins 3/15 (3.4 overs)

United States of America won by 5 wickets
Bready Cricket Club Ground, County Tyrone
Umpires: Mark Hawthorne (Ire) and Paul Wilson (WI)
Player of the match: Akeem Dodson (USA)

- United States of America won the toss and elected to field.
- Naseer Jamali (USA) made his T20 debut.

15 July
14:15
Scorecard

Nepal; 109 (20 overs)	v	Hong Kong; 110/5 (19.1 overs)
Sharad Vesawkar 27 (24); Haseeb Amjad 4/16 (4 overs)		Nizakat Khan 25 (18); Basanta Regmi 4/16 (4 overs)

Hong Kong won by 5 wickets
Stormont, Belfast
Umpires: Johan Cloete (SA) and Ruchira Palliyaguruge (SL)
Player of the match: Haseeb Amjad (HK)

- Hong Kong won the toss and elected to field.
- Anshuman Rath (HK) made his T20I debut.

17 July
10:00
Scorecard

Nepal; 93 (19.4 overs)	v	Papua New Guinea; 99/2 (14.1 overs)
Pradeep Airee 29 (28); Assad Vala 2/7 (2.4 overs)		Assad Vala 34* (44); Sompal Kami 1/14 (3 overs)

Papua New Guinea won by 8 wickets
Malahide Cricket Club Ground, Dublin
Umpires: Johan Cloete (SA) and Tim Robinson (Eng)
Player of the match: Assad Vala (PNG)

- Papua New Guinea won the toss and elected to field.
- Papua New Guinea advanced to the playoffs with this win.

17 July
10:00
Scorecard

Jersey; 161/4 (20 overs)	v	Namibia; 164/1 (16.3 overs)
Jonty Jenner 90* (52); Bernard Scholtz 2/21 (4 overs)		Gerrie Snyman 82 (43); Anthony Hawkins-Kay 1/25 (3 overs)

Namibia won by 9 wickets
Clontarf Cricket Club Ground, Dublin
Umpires: Anil Chaudhary (Ind) and Nigel Llong (Eng)
Player of the match: Gerrie Snyman (Nam)

- Namibia won the toss and elected to field.

17 July
14:15
Scorecard

Hong Kong; 129/8 (20 overs)	v	Ireland; 124/8 (20 overs)
Mark Chapman 30 (24); Kevin O'Brien 3/32 (4 overs)		Paul Stirling 34 (40); Irfan Ahmed 3/11 (4 overs)

Hong Kong won by 5 runs
Malahide Cricket Club Ground, Dublin
Umpires: Ruchira Palliyaguruge (SL) and Paul Wilson (Aus)
Player of the match: Irfan Ahmed (HK)

- Ireland won the toss and elected to field.

18 July
10:00
Scorecard

Nepal; 105/8 (20 overs)	v	Jersey; 107/3 (16.1 overs)
Siddhant Lohani 27 (16); Nathaniel Watkins 3/20 (4 overs)		Jonty Jenner 30 (26); Paras Khadka 1/6 (2 overs)

Jersey won by 7 wickets
Malahide Cricket Club Ground, Dublin
Umpires: Mark Hawthorne (Ire) and Nigel Llong (Eng)
Player of the match: Nathaniel Watkins (Jer)

- Jersey won the toss and elected to field.
- Siddhant Lohani (Nep) made his T20 debut.

18 July
14:15
Scorecard

Namibia; 181/5 (20 overs)	v	Papua New Guinea; 132 (19.2 overs)
Stephan Baard 87 (54); Willie Gavera 2/33 (4 overs)		Tony Ura 34 (21); Bernard Scholtz 4/11 (4 overs)

Namibia won by 49 runs
Malahide Cricket Club Ground, Dublin
Umpires: Anil Chaudhary (Ind) and Ruchira Palliyaguruge (SL)
Player of the match: Bernard Scholtz (Nam)

- Papua New Guinea won the toss and elected to field.

18 July
14:15
Scorecard

Hong Kong; 125/9 (20 overs)	v	United States; 128/3 (18.1 overs)
James Atkinson 34 (23); Japen Patel 3/28 (3 overs)		Alex Amsterdam 43* (39); Tanwir Afzal 1/20 (4 overs)

United States of America won by 7 wickets
Clontarf Cricket Club Ground, Dublin
Umpires: Johan Cloete (SA) and Paul Wilson (Aus)
Player of the match: Nicholas Standford (USA)

- United States of America won the toss and elected to field.
- Giacomo Lamplough (HK) made his T20 debut.

19 July
10:00
Scorecard

Jersey; 122 (19.5 overs)	v	Ireland; 123/3 (16.4 overs)
Peter Gough 42 (44); Paul Stirling 3/16 (4 overs)		Paul Stirling 55 (38); Ben Stevens 2/20 (3 overs)

Ireland won by 7 wickets
Malahide Cricket Club Ground, Dublin
Umpires: Johan Cloete (SA) and Nigel Llong (Eng)
Player of the match: Paul Stirling (Ire)

- Ireland won the toss and elected to field.
- John Mooney (Ire) took a hat-trick.

19 July
14:15
Scorecard

United States; 147/6 (20 overs)	v	Papua New Guinea; 129/9 (20 overs)
Nicholas Standford 40* (17); Charles Amini 2/20 (2 overs)		Sese Bau 26 (31); Muhammad Ghous 2/27 (4 overs)

United States of America won by 18 runs
Malahide Cricket Club Ground, Dublin
Umpires: Tim Robinson (Eng) and Paul Wilson (Aus)
Player of the match: Nicholas Standford (USA)

- Papua New Guinea won the toss and elected to field.
- Sese Bau (PNG) made his T20 debut.

19 July
14:15
Scorecard

Hong Kong; 197/8 (20 overs)	v	Namibia; 114 (15.1 overs)
Irfan Ahmed 98 (55); Gerrie Snyman 4/30 (4 overs)		Sarel Burger 28 (26); Nadeem Ahmed 5/12 (3.1 overs)

Hong Kong won by 83 runs
Clontarf Cricket Club Ground, Dublin
Umpires: Mark Hawthorne (Ire) and Ruchira Palliyaguruge (SL)
Player of the match: Irfan Ahmed (HK)

- Namibia won the toss and elected to field.

=== Group B ===
Pos	Team	Pld	W	L	T	NR	Pts	NRR
1	Scotland	6	4	2	0	0	8	1.205
2	Netherlands	6	4	2	0	0	8	1.151
3	Afghanistan	6	3	1	0	2	8	0.690
4	Oman	6	3	2	0	1	7	0.374
5	Kenya	6	3	2	0	1	7	−0.645
6	United Arab Emirates	6	1	4	0	1	3	−1.688
7	Canada	6	0	5	0	1	1	−1.295

Advanced to 2016 World Twenty20 and Semifinal 1.
Advanced to Playoffs.

9 July
10:00
Scorecard

United Arab Emirates; 109 (18.1 overs)	v	Scotland; 110/1 (10 overs)
Mohammad Naveed 19* (17); Michael Leask 3/20 (4 overs)		George Munsey 62*(36); Mohammad Naveed 1/26 (4 overs)

Scotland won by 9 wickets
Grange Cricket Club Ground, Edinburgh
Umpires: Ahsan Raza (Pak) and Shaun George (SA)
Player of the match: George Munsey (Sco)

- Scotland won the toss and elected to field
- Mohammad Shahzad, Umair Ali, Abdul Shakoor, Mohammad Tauqir and Mohammad Naveed (all UAE) made their T20I debuts.

9 July
14:15
Scorecard

Afghanistan; 162/7 (20 overs)	v	Netherlands; 130 (19.4 overs)
Samiullah Shinwari 44 (42); Ahsan Malik 3/36 (4 overs)		Ben Cooper 36 (23); Sharafuddin Ashraf 3/27 (4 overs)

Afghanistan won by 32 runs
Grange Cricket Club Ground, Edinburgh
Umpires: Gregory Brathwaite (WI) and David Odhiambo (Ken)
Player of the match: Sharafuddin Ashraf (Afg)

- Netherlands won the toss and elected to field.
- Sharafuddin Ashraf (Afg) made his T20I debut.

10 July
10:00
Scorecard

Canada; 143/5 (20 overs)	v	Kenya; 146/3 (18.3 overs)
Ruvindu Gunasekera 51 (38); Nelson Odhiambo 2/22 (4 overs)		Irfan Karim 74* (54); Jeremy Gordon 2/23 (3.3 overs)

Kenya won by 7 wickets
Myreside Cricket Ground, Edinburgh
Umpires: Gregory Brathwaite (WI) and Shaun George (SA)
Player of the match: Irfan Karim (Ken)

- Kenya won the toss and elected to field.
- Start was delayed by rain.
- Navneet Dhaliwal and Satsimranjit Dhindsa (Can) and Narendra Kalyan (Ken) made their T20 debuts.

10 July
14:15
Scorecard

United Arab Emirates; 164/6 (20 overs)	v	Afghanistan; 168/2 (17.2 overs)
Mohammad Shahzad 43 (28); Mirwais Ashraf 2/21 (4 overs)		Mohammad Shahzad 74 (37); Umair Ali 1/13 (2 overs)

Afghanistan won by 8 wickets
Grange Cricket Club Ground, Edinburgh
Umpires: Nigel Llong (Eng) and Ian Ramage (Sco)
Player of the match: Mohammad Shahzad (Afg)

- United Arab Emirates won the toss and elected to bat.

11 July
10:00
Scorecard

Netherlands; 191/6 (20 overs)	v	Scotland; 159 (19.5 overs)
Wesley Barresi 75 (40); Alasdair Evans 5/24 (4 overs)		Preston Mommsen 68* (44); Mudassar Bukhari 3/22 (2.5 overs)

Netherlands won by 32 runs
Grange Cricket Club Ground, Edinburgh
Umpires: Vineet Kulkarni (Ind) and David Odhiambo (Ken)
Player of the match: Alasdair Evans (Sco)

- Netherlands won the toss and elected to bat.

11 July
10:00
Scorecard

Kenya; 143/7 (20 overs)	v	Oman; 136/7 (20 overs)
Collins Obuya 50 (37); Rajesh Ranpura 2/17 (4 overs)		Jatinder Singh 31 (34); Shem Ngoche 3/25 (4 overs)

Kenya won by 7 runs
Myreside Cricket Ground, Edinburgh
Umpires: Ahsan Raza (Pak) and Ian Ramage (Sco)
Player of the match: Collins Obuya (Ken)

- Oman won the toss and elected to field.
- Munis Ansari, Khawar Ali, Mehran Khan and Zeeshan Maqsood (all Oman) made their T20 debuts.

12 July
10:00
Scorecard

United Arab Emirates; 119/7 (20 overs)	v	Netherlands; 125/3 (17.1 overs)
Swapnil Patil 34 (33); Roelof van der Merwe 2/10 (4 overs)		Ben Cooper 50* (38); Mohammad Naveed 1/10 (2 overs)

Netherlands won by 7 wickets
Grange Cricket Club Ground, Edinburgh
Umpires: Vineet Kulkarni (Ind) and Nigel Llong (Eng)
Player of the match: Roelof van der Merwe (Ned)

- Netherlands won the toss and elected to field.
- Fayyaz Ahmed and Nasir Aziz (both UAE) made their T20I debuts.

12 July
10:00
Scorecard

Canada; 133/3 (13 overs)	v	Oman; 135/3 (11.2 overs)
Nitish Kumar 52 (25); Aamir Kaleem 1/6 (1 over)		Zeeshan Maqsood 86* (41); Nitish Kumar 1/12 (1 over)

Oman won by 7 wickets (DLS method)
New Williamfield, Stirling
Umpires: Shaun George (SA) and Ian Ramage (Sco)

- Oman won the toss and elected to field.
- Match reduced to 13 overs per side.
- Mohammad Nadeem (Oman) made his T20 debut.

12 July
14:15
Scorecard

Afghanistan; 210/5 (20 overs)	v	Scotland; 173 (19.2 overs)
Mohammad Shahzad 75 (36); Michael Leask 2/24 (4 overs)		Preston Mommsen 44 (20); Mohammad Nabi 3/25 (4 overs)

Afghanistan won by 37 runs
Grange Cricket Club Ground, Edinburgh
Umpires: Ahsan Raza (Pak) and Gregory Brathwaite (WI)
Player of the match: Mohammad Shahzad (Afg)

- Afghanistan won the toss and elected to bat.
- Afghanistan's total of 210 runs is their highest in T20 cricket.

13 July
14:15
Scorecard

Afghanistan	v	Kenya

Match abandoned
New Williamfield, Stirling
Umpires: Vineet Kulkarni (Ind) and Nigel Llong (Eng)

- No toss.
- Match abandoned without a ball bowled.

14 July
10:00
Scorecard

Netherlands; 135 (19.4 overs)	v	Oman; 138/4 (19 overs)
Stephan Myburgh 41 (43); Munis Ansari 4/15 (4 overs)		Jatinder Singh 65* (56); Michael Rippon 1/19 (3 overs)

Oman won by 6 wickets
Myreside Cricket Ground, Edinburgh
Umpires: Nigel Llong (Eng) and David Odhiambo (Ken)
Player of the match: Jatinder Singh (Oman)

- Oman won the toss and elected to field.

14 July
10:00
Scorecard

Canada; 132/9 (20 overs)	v	United Arab Emirates; 136/5 (19.1 overs)
Hiral Patel 45 (27); Rohan Mustafa 2/15 (4 overs)		Mohammad Shahzad 56 (53); Cecil Pervez 2/32 (4 overs)

United Arab Emirates won by 5 wickets
New Williamfield, Stirling
Umpires: Gregory Brathwaite (WI) and Ian Ramage (Sco)
Player of the match: Mohammad Shahzad (UAE)

- United Arab Emirates won the toss and elected to field.
- Srimantha Wijeratne (Can) made his T20 debut.

14 July
14:15
Scorecard

Kenya; 141/5 (20 overs)	v	Scotland; 142/3 (14.5 overs)
Irfan Karim 46 (26); Michael Leask 2/12 (3 overs)		Matthew Cross 45* (34); Elijah Otieno 1/24 (2.5 overs)

Scotland won by 7 wickets
Grange Cricket Club Ground, Edinburgh
Umpires: Ahsan Raza (Pak) and Shaun George (SA)
Player of the match: Richie Berrington (Sco)

- Kenya won the toss and elected to bat.

15 July
10:00
Scorecard

Oman; 144/7 (20 overs)	v	Afghanistan; 104 (17.5 overs)
Jatinder Singh 40 (48); Mohammad Nabi 3/28 (4 overs)		Mohammad Shahzad 28 (19); Zeeshan Maqsood 4/23 (2.5 overs)

Oman won by 40 runs
Goldenacre, Edinburgh
Umpires: Vineet Kulkarni (Ind) and Ian Ramage (Sco)
Player of the match: Mehran Khan (Oman)

- Afghanistan won the toss and elected to field.

15 July
14:15
Scorecard

Kenya; 147/5 (20 overs)	v	United Arab Emirates; 105 (17.2 overs)
Rakep Patel 50 (27); Umair Ali 2/24 (4 overs)		Shaiman Anwar 25 (13); Narendra Kalyan 4/16 (4 overs)

Kenya won by 42 runs
Goldenacre, Edinburgh
Umpires: Shaun George (SA) and Vineet Kulkarni (Ind)
Player of the match: Narendra Kalyan (Ken)

- Kenya won the toss and elected to bat.
- Eugene Ochieng (Ken) made his T20 debut.

16 July
10:00
Scorecard

Canada; 135/8 (20 overs)	v	Scotland; 139/2 (14.4 overs)
Navneet Dhaliwal 34 (37); Josh Davey 3/36 (4 overs)		Kyle Coetzer 51* (41); Satsimranjit Dhindsa 2/27 (3 overs)

Scotland won by 8 wickets
Goldenacre, Edinburgh
Umpires: Ahsan Raza (Pak) and David Odhiambo (Ken)
Player of the match: Kyle Coetzer (Sco)

- Scotland won the toss and elected to field.

17 July
10:00
Scorecard

Canada; 172/8 (20 overs)	v	Netherlands; 174/4 (17.3 overs)
Ruvindu Gunasekera 51 (44); Michael Swart 2/24 (4 overs)		Stephan Myburgh 67 (30); Cecil Pervez 2/26 (2.3 overs)

Netherlands won by 6 wickets
Goldenacre, Edinburgh
Umpires: Gregory Brathwaite (WI) and Ian Ramage (Sco)
Player of the match: Stephan Myburgh (Ned)

- Netherlands won the toss and elected to field.
- Match delayed by a wet outfield.

17 July
10:00
Scorecard

United Arab Emirates	v	Oman

Match abandoned
New Williamfield, Stirling
Umpires: Shaun George (SA) and David Odhiambo (Ken)

- No toss.
- Match delayed by a wet outfield.
- Match abandoned without a ball bowled.

18 July
10:00
Scorecard

Scotland; 173/5 (20 overs)	v	Oman; 150/7 (20 overs)
Kyle Coetzer 63 (38); Zeeshan Maqsood 3/29 (4 overs)		Aamir Kaleem 59 (47); Safyaan Sharif 3/27 (4 overs)

Scotland won by 23 runs
Goldenacre, Edinburgh
Umpires: Shaun George (SA) and David Odhiambo (Ken)
Player of the match: Kyle Coetzer (Sco)

- Oman won the toss and elected to field.

18 July
10:00
Scorecard

Afghanistan	v	Canada

Match abandoned
New Williamfield, Stirling
Umpires: Gregory Brathwaite (WI) and Ian Ramage (Sco)

- No toss.
- Match delayed by a wet outfield.
- Match abandoned without a ball bowled.

18 July
14:15
Scorecard

Kenya; 97 (20 overs)	v	Netherlands; 98/6 (8.3 overs)
Collins Obuya 33 (44); Timm van der Gugten 3/13 (4 overs)		Ben Cooper 59 (24); Shem Ngoche 3/19 (2.3 overs)

Netherlands won by 4 wickets
Myreside Cricket Ground, Edinburgh
Umpires: Ahsan Raza (Pak) and Vineet Kulkarni (Ind)
Player of the match: Timm van der Gugten (Ned)

- Netherlands won the toss and elected to field.

== Playoffs ==
=== Bracket ===
Qualifiers
A2	Hong Kong	162/5
B3	Afghanistan	161/7
A3	Namibia	135/6
B2	Netherlands	137/6

Semi-finals†
B1	Scotland	117/5
A2	Hong Kong	116
A1	Ireland	128
B2	Netherlands	129/5

Final
B1	Scotland	abd.
B2	Netherlands	abd.
3rd place play-off
A2	Hong Kong	abd.
A1	Ireland	abd.

Qualifiers
A4	Papua New Guinea	127/6
B3	Afghanistan	128/4
B4	Oman	150/5
A3	Namibia	148/9

5th place play-off†
B3	Afghanistan	130/5
B4	Oman	127/9

- * Team entered by losing in the playoff qualifiers.
- ^{†} Teams qualified for the 2016 ICC World Twenty20 upon reaching this stage.

=== Qualifier 1 ===
21 July
10:00
Scorecard

Afghanistan; 161/7 (20 overs)	v	Hong Kong; 162/5 (20 overs)
Nawroz Mangal 53 (36); Haseeb Amjad 3/28 (4 overs)		James Atkinson 47 (47); Shapoor Zadran 2/31 (4 overs)

Hong Kong won by 5 wickets
Malahide Cricket Club Ground, Dublin
Umpires: Shaun George (SA) and Nigel Llong (Eng)
Player of the match: Nawroz Mangal (Afg)

- Afghanistan won the toss and elected to bat.
- Winner qualifies for 2016 ICC World Twenty20 and play Semifinal 1 and loser will play in Qualifier 3.

=== Qualifier 2 ===
21 July
14:15
Scorecard

Namibia; 135/6 (20 overs)	v	Netherlands; 137/6 (19.2 overs)
Craig Williams 43 (32); Timm van der Gugten 2/22 (4 overs)		Stephan Myburgh 31 (18); Bernard Scholtz 3/15 (4 overs)

Netherlands won by 4 wickets
Malahide Cricket Club Ground, Dublin
Umpires: Johan Cloete (SA) and Vineet Kulkarni (Ind)
Player of the match: Bernard Scholtz (Nam)

- Namibia won the toss and elected to bat.
- Winner qualifies for 2016 ICC World Twenty20 and play Semifinal 2 and loser will play in Qualifier 4.

=== Qualifier 3 ===
23 July
10:00
Scorecard

Papua New Guinea; 127/6 (20 overs)	v	Afghanistan; 128/4 (18.2 overs)
Charles Amini 37* (37); Shapoor Zadran 2/9 (4 overs)		Nawroz Mangal 65* (56); Norman Vanua 2/19 (3.2 overs)

Afghanistan won by 6 wickets
Malahide Cricket Club Ground, Dublin
Umpires: Gregory Brathwaite (WI) and Anil Chaudhary (Ind)
Player of the match: Nawroz Mangal (Afg)

- Papua New Guinea won the toss and elected to bat.
- Winner qualifies for 2016 ICC World Twenty20 and play 5th Place Playoff.
- Vani Morea and Chad Soper (both PNG) made their T20I debuts.

=== Qualifier 4 ===
23 July
14:15
Scorecard

Namibia; 148/9 (20 overs)	v	Oman; 150/5 (19 overs)
Stephan Baard 62 (52); Munis Ansari 3/23 (4 overs)		Zeeshan Siddiqui 51* (32); Gerrie Snyman 1/23 (3 overs)

Oman won by 5 wickets
Malahide Cricket Club Ground, Dublin
Umpires: Ruchira Palliyaguruge (SL) and Ian Ramage (Sco)
Player of the match: Zeeshan Siddiqui (Oman)

- Oman won the toss and elected to field.
- Winner qualifies for 2016 ICC World Twenty20 and play 5th Place Playoff.
- Aamer Ali (Oman) made his T20 debut.

=== Semifinal 1 ===
25 July
10:00
Scorecard

Hong Kong; 116 (19.4 overs)	v	Scotland; 117/5 (12.2 overs)
Aizaz Khan 31 (21); Alasdair Evans 3/17 (4 overs); Robert Taylor 3/17 (4 overs)		Matthew Cross 39 (15); Irfan Ahmed 2/26 (3 overs)

Scotland won by 5 wickets
Malahide Cricket Club Ground, Dublin
Umpires: Shaun George (SA) and Ruchira Palliyaguruge (SL)
Player of the match: Robert Taylor (Sco)

- Scotland won the toss and elected to field.
- Winner qualifies for Final and loser will play in 3rd Place Playoff.

=== 5th Place Playoff ===
25 July
10:00
Scorecard

Oman; 127/9 (20 overs)	v	Afghanistan; 130/5 (18.5 overs)
Khawar Ali 21 (26); Dawlat Zadran 2/21 (4 overs)		Najibullah Zadran 44 (34); Rajesh Ranpura 2/17 (4 overs)

Afghanistan won by 5 wickets
Clontarf Cricket Club Ground, Dublin
Umpires: Gregory Brathwaite (WI) and Anil Chaudhary (Ind)
Player of the match: Najibullah Zadran (Afg)

- Afghanistan won the toss and elected to field.
- After securing a top-six finish with their win over Namibia in the qualifiers, this became Oman's first T20I match.
- Aamir Kaleem, Aamer Ali, Munis Ansari, Jatinder Singh, Khawar Ali, Mehran Khan, Mohammad Nadeem, Rajesh Ranpura, Sultan Ahmed, Zeeshan Maqsood and Zeeshan Siddiqui (all Oman) made their T20I debuts.

=== Semifinal 2 ===
25 July
14:15
Scorecard

Ireland; 128 (19.5 overs)	v	Netherlands; 129/5 (18.1 overs)
Kevin O'Brien 33 (18); Mudassar Bukhari 4/28 (4 overs)		Ben Cooper 43 (40); Kevin O'Brien 3/26 (4 overs)

Netherlands win by 5 wickets
Malahide Cricket Club Ground, Dublin
Umpires: Johan Cloete (SA) and Vineet Kulkarni (Ind)
Player of the match: Mudassar Bukhari (Ned)

- Netherlands won the toss and elected to field.
- Winner qualifies for Final and loser will play in 3rd Place Playoff.

=== 3rd Place Playoff ===
26 July
10:00
Scorecard

Hong Kong	v	Ireland

Match abandoned
Malahide Cricket Club Ground, Dublin
Umpires: Vineet Kulkarni (Ind) and Ruchira Palliyaguruge (SL)

- No toss.
- Match abandoned without a ball bowled.
- With no play possible, Ireland finished in third place due to finishing top of their group.

=== Final ===
26 July
14:15
Scorecard

Scotland	v	Netherlands

Match abandoned
Malahide Cricket Club Ground, Dublin
Umpires: Johan Cloete (SA) and Shaun George (SA)

- No toss.
- Match abandoned without a ball bowled.
- With the match being abandoned, the Netherlands and Scotland shared the trophy.

== Final standings ==
Position	Team
1st	Scotland
1st	Netherlands
3rd	Ireland
4th	Hong Kong
5th	Afghanistan
6th	Oman
7th	Namibia
8th	Papua New Guinea
9th	Kenya
10th	United States
11th	Jersey
12th	Nepal
13th	United Arab Emirates
14th	Canada

1st to 6th Qualified for the 2016 ICC World Twenty20 and 2019 ICC T20 World Cup Qualifier.
