= Japen Patel =

Indian-born American cricketer

Personal information
- Full name: Japen Patel
- Born: 1 October 1987 (age 39); Baroda, Gujarat, India
- Height: 5 ft 10 in (178 cm)
- Batting: Right-handed
- Bowling: Right-arm medium
- Role: All-rounder

International information
- National side: United States (2011–2015)

Career statistics
Competition	T20
Matches	15
Runs scored	119
Batting average	9.15
100s/50s	0/0
Top score	30
Balls bowled	60
Wickets	6
Bowling average	17.00
5 wickets in innings	0
10 wickets in match	0
Best bowling	3/28
Catches/stumpings	2/–
- Source: CricketArchive, 8 May 2022

Japen Hitesh Patel (born 1 October 1987) is an Indian-born American cricketer. A right-handed all-rounder, he made his debut for the American national side in July 2011, and has since played regularly at international level.

Born in Baroda, Gujarat, Patel's debut tournament for the U.S. national team was the 2011 Americas Twenty20 Championship, played in Florida. Although he had only played two games at the tournament, he was retained in the American squad for the subsequent 2012 World Twenty20 Qualifier in the United Arab Emirates, where matches had full Twenty20 status. On debut against Oman, Patel took 3/29 from his four overs. He was retained in the side for the final two group-stage matches, against Kenya and Scotland, and also played in the 11th-place playoff against Hong Kong, where he was one of four Americans bowled out by Aizaz Khan (who finished with 5/25).

Patel's next major tournament for the U.S. was the 2013 Americas Twenty20 Championship, although he had featured in the annual Auty Cup fixture against Canada late in the previous year, in the absence of several senior players. In the Americas Twenty20 tournament, Patel played little part – he was required to bat only three times in his eight matches (for 77 runs) and bowled only 10 overs (for three wickets). His highest score, 176 from 105 balls, came against the Bahamas, after he was promoted to third in the batting order behind Steven Taylor and Timothy Surujbally. The following month, Patel played in the 2013 WCL Division Three tournament in Bermuda, his first 50-over international tournament. Japen is known as one of the best all rounders to represent USA. He also attended the Rajasthan Royals IPL Camp back in 2011 with Shane Warne, Shane Watson, Rahul Dravid, and Ajinkya Rahane.

At the 2013 World Twenty20 Qualifier in the UAE, Patel played in six out of a possible seven matches for the U.S., including all but one of the group stage games. He had little success, however, scoring only 66 runs for the tournament from six innings and not being called upon to bowl. His best score, 30 from 20 balls, came in the 15th-place playoff against Denmark, and included two sixes. Patel is yet to play any further 50-over tournaments for the U.S. national side – he was selected in the U.S. squad for the 2015 Americas Twenty20 Championship, but withdrew the month before the tournament. Recently Japen Patel has been busy pursuing his acting career, with a notable appearance in the hit Netflix show Outer Banks.
