= Umair Ali =

Emirati cricketer (born 1986)

Personal information
- Full name: Umair Ali Khan
- Born: 3 March 1986 (age 40); Karachi, Pakistan
- Batting: Right-handed
- Bowling: Right-arm medium
- Role: Batsman

International information
- National side: United Arab Emirates
- ODI debut (cap 61): 16 November 2015 v Hong Kong
- Last ODI: 18 November 2015 v Hong Kong
- T20I debut (cap 18): 9 July 2015 v Scotland
- Last T20I: 12 July 2015 v Netherlands
- Source: ESPNcricinfo, 27 July 2020

Umair Ali (born 3 March 1986) is a Pakistani-born cricketer who played for the United Arab Emirates national cricket team. He made his Twenty20 International debut against Scotland in the 2015 ICC World Twenty20 Qualifier tournament on 9 July 2015. His One Day International debut was against Hong Kong in the 2015–17 ICC World Cricket League Championship on 16 November 2015. In July 2020, he was targeting a return to the national team, after a gap of five years. He has not again played for the UAE after November 2015.
