= Myreside Cricket Ground =

Cricket ground in Edinburgh, Scotland

Coordinates: 55°55′39″N 03°13′33″W

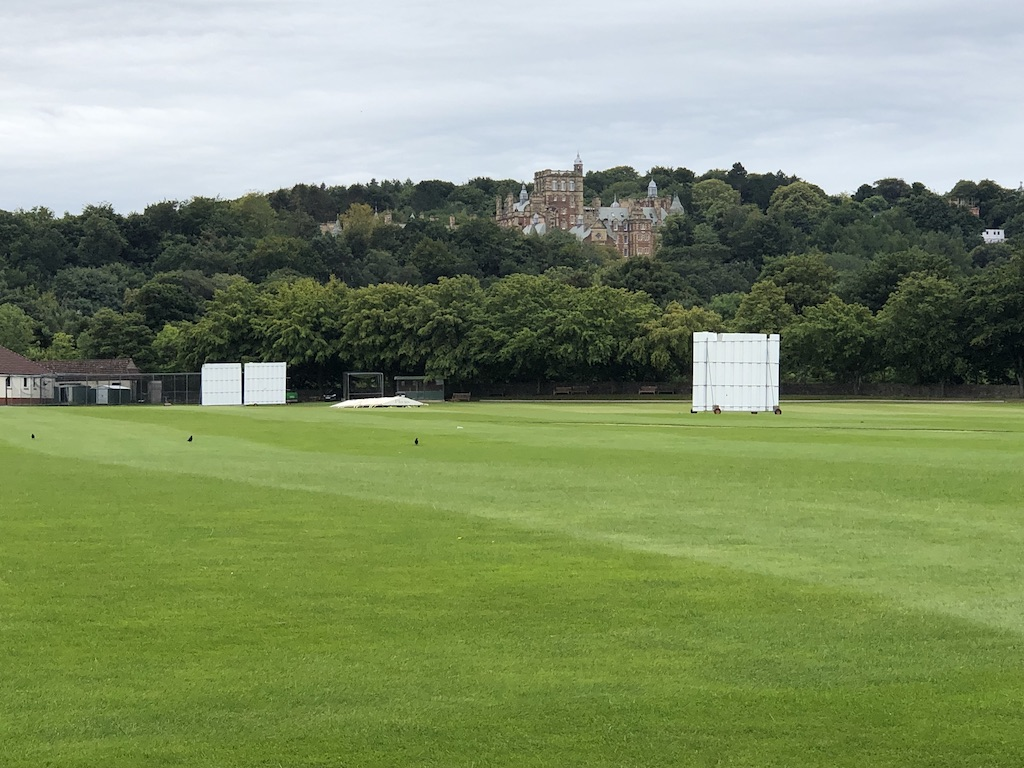
- Interactive map of Myreside Cricket Ground

Ground information
- Location: Edinburgh, Scotland
- Country: Scotland
- Establishment: 1901 (first recorded match)

Team information
| Scotland | (1982–1993) |
- As of 19 October 2011; Source: Ground profile

Myreside Cricket Ground is a cricket ground in Edinburgh, Scotland. The first recorded match held on the ground came in 1901 when George Watson's College played Blair Lodge School. The ground held its first first-class match when Scotland played Ireland in 1982, while in 1990 it held a second first-class fixture between the sides. The ground held its first List A match when Scotland played Glamorgan in the 1985 NatWest Trophy. Five further List A matches were played there, the last of which saw Scotland play Worcestershire in the 1993 NatWest Trophy.

The ground is still in use today by Watsonians Cricket Club.

It was selected as a venue to host matches in the 2015 ICC World Twenty20 Qualifier tournament.
