= Alex Amsterdam =

Guyanese-born American cricketer

Personal information
- Full name: Alex Adrian Anthony Amsterdam
- Born: June 8, 1991 (age 35); Guyana
- Batting: Left-handed
- Bowling: Right off spin

International information
- National side: United States (2015–2016)

Domestic team information
- Years: Team
- 2016: ICC Americas
- Source: CricketArchive, 29 December 2015

Alex Adrian Anthony Amsterdam (born June 8, 1991) is an American cricketer of Guyanese origin. He made his debut for the American national side in July 2015.

Originally from Skeldon, in Guyana's East Berbice-Corentyne region, Amsterdam played for the Guyana under-19s before emigrating to the United States. He continued playing cricket after moving to Brooklyn, New York, and after good performances at club and regional level was selected in the U.S. squad for the 2015 World Twenty20 Qualifier. At that tournament, Amsterdam played in five of his team's six matches, all of which held Twenty20 status. His best batting performance was 43 not out against Hong Kong, while his only wicket of the tournament came against Namibia. Later in 2015, Amsterdam was selected in the ICC Americas squad for the 2015–16 Regional Super50, a West Indian List A competition in which the region had been invited to compete as a guest. In the first match, against Barbados, he scored 73 from 87 balls.

In October 2018, he was named in the United States' squads for the 2018–19 Regional Super50 tournament in the West Indies and for the 2018 ICC World Cricket League Division Three tournament in Oman.
