= 2016 World Twenty20 =

Sixth edition of the ICC Men's T20 World Cup

2016 ICC World Twenty20
- Tournament logo
- Dates: 8 March – 3 April 2016
- Administrator: International Cricket Council
- Cricket format: Twenty20 International
- Tournament format(s): Group stage and knockout
- Host: India
- Champions: West Indies (2nd title)
- Runners-up: England
- Participants: 16
- Matches: 35
- Attendance: 768,902 (21,969 per match)
- Player of the series: (India) Virat Kohli
- Most runs: (Bangladesh) Tamim Iqbal (295)
- Most wickets: (Afghanistan) Mohammad Nabi (12)
- Official website: www.icc-cricket.com

The 2016 ICC World Twenty20 was the sixth edition of the Men's T20 World Cup, formerly known as the ICC World Twenty20, a Twenty20 International cricket tournament that was held in India from 8 March to 3 April 2016, and was the first edition to be hosted by India.

Seven cities hosted matches in the tournament – Bangalore, Dharamshala, Kolkata, Mohali, Mumbai, Nagpur, and New Delhi. For the second time, there were 16 participating teams, 10 of which qualified automatically due to their status as full members of the International Cricket Council (ICC), and another six qualifying through the 2015 World Twenty20 Qualifier. The tournament was divided into three stages. In the first stage, the eight lowest-ranked teams played off, with the top two joining the eight highest-ranked teams in the Super 10 stage. Finally, the top four teams overall contested the knockout stage. In the final, played at Eden Gardens, Kolkata, the West Indies defeated England by four wickets. Indian batsman Virat Kohli was named the player of the tournament, while Bangladesh's Tamim Iqbal and Afghanistan's Mohammad Nabi led the tournament in runs and wickets, respectively.

== Teams ==
For the second time, the tournament featured 16 teams. All ten full members qualified automatically, joined by the six associate members: Ireland, Scotland, Netherlands, Afghanistan, Hong Kong and Oman who all qualified through the 2015 ICC World Twenty20 Qualifier, played in Ireland and Scotland between 6 and 26 July 2015. Oman made its debut in the tournament.

The top eight Full Member nations in the ICC T20I Championship rankings as of 30 April 2014 automatically progressed to the Super 10 stage, with the remaining eight teams competing in the group stage. From the group stage, Bangladesh and associate nation Afghanistan advanced to the Super 10 stage. Test playing nation Zimbabwe and Ireland failed to advance to the Super 10 stage for the second time.

In October 2015 Shahryar Khan, chairman of the Pakistan Cricket Board (PCB), said that Pakistan would consider pulling out of the tournament if the series against India did not go ahead. Although the series was ultimately cancelled, Pakistan received government clearance in February 2016 to visit India to compete in the tournament. In early March, Pakistan sent a delegation to assess the security arrangements ahead of the tournament. Following the visit, the match between India and Pakistan was moved from Dharamsala to Eden Gardens in Kolkata, at the request of the PCB, and on 11 March, Pakistan confirmed their participation in the tournament.

Qualification	Country
Host	India
Full Members	Australia
Full Members	England
Full Members	New Zealand
Full Members	Pakistan
Full Members	South Africa
Full Members	Sri Lanka
Full Members	West Indies
Full Members	Bangladesh
Full Members	Zimbabwe
Qualifier	Scotland
Qualifier	Netherlands
Qualifier	Ireland
Qualifier	Hong Kong
Qualifier	Afghanistan
Qualifier	Oman

== Match officials ==
The match referees’ responsibilities throughout the men's tournament were shared between six members of the Elite Panel of ICC Referees :

- (Australia) David Boon
- (England) Chris Broad
- (New Zealand) Jeff Crowe
- (Sri Lanka) Ranjan Madugalle
- (Zimbabwe) Andy Pycroft
- (India) Javagal Srinath

The on-field responsibilities for officiating the men's tournament were shared by all 12 of the Elite Panel of ICC Umpires and 3 umpires from the International Panel of ICC Umpires :

- (South Africa) Johan Cloete
- (Pakistan) Aleem Dar
- (Sri Lanka) Kumar Dharmasena
- (South Africa) Marais Erasmus
- (New Zealand) Chris Gaffaney
- (England) Michael Gough
- (England) Ian Gould
- (England) Richard Illingworth
- (England) Richard Kettleborough
- (England) Nigel Llong
- (Australia) Bruce Oxenford
- (India) Sundaram Ravi
- (Australia) Paul Reiffel
- (Australia) Rod Tucker
- (Cricket West Indies) Joel Wilson

== Squads ==
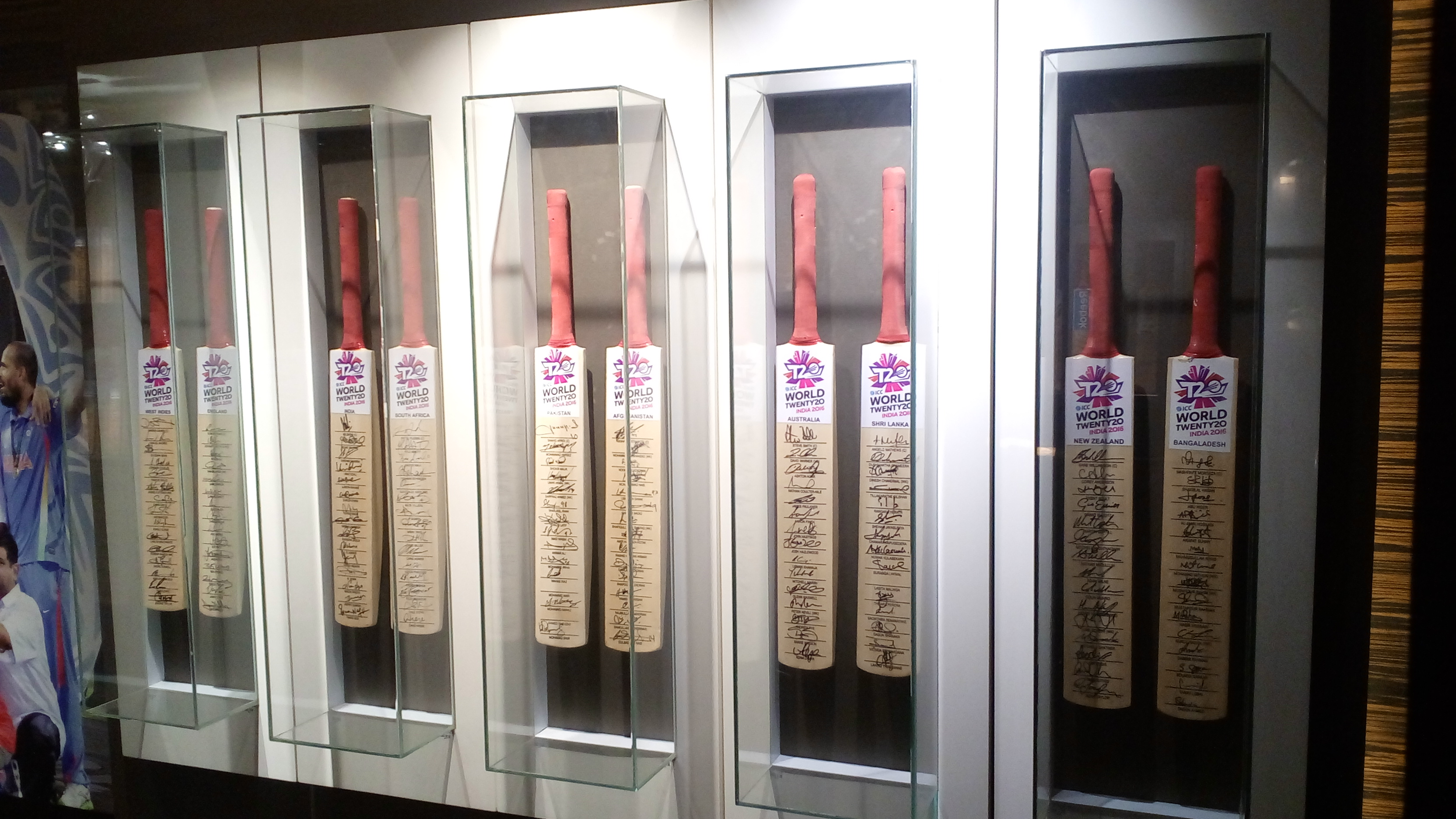
Autographed bats of teams that participated in the 2016 T20 World Cup at Blades of Glory Museum, Pune, India.

Prior to the tournament, each team selected a squad of 15 players.

== Venues ==
On 21 July 2015, the Indian cricket board announced the name of the cities which will be hosting the matches. Bangalore, Chennai, Dharamshala, Mohali, Mumbai, Nagpur and New Delhi were the venues along with Kolkata, which also hosted the final of the event. Chennai could not host a match due to legal issues regarding the construction of three stands at the M. A. Chidambaram Stadium. VCA Stadium, Nagpur hosted all Group B games and HPCA Stadium, Dharamshala hosted all Group A matches. The India vs Pakistan match, was scheduled to be played at HPCA Stadium. With the announcement that HPCA authority could not provide the required security for Pakistani team, the match was moved to Eden Gardens, Kolkata.

There were some initial concerns about the Feroz Shah Kotla stadium in Delhi hosting the first semi-final, due to one of the block of stands needing a clearance certificate from the South Delhi Municipal Corporation (SDMC). If the clearance was not approved, the ICC and BCCI were planning an alternative venue to host the match. However, on 23 March, the Delhi & District Cricket Association were granted clearance from the SDMC to use the block at the Feroz Shah Kotla.

Venues for the 2016 ICC World Twenty20.

Bangalore	Dharamshala	Mohali
M. Chinnaswamy Stadium	HPCA Stadium	I. S. Bindra Stadium
Capacity: 40,000	Capacity: 23,000	Capacity: 26,950
Matches: 3	Matches: 7	Matches: 3
Kolkata
Eden Gardens
Capacity: 66,349
Matches: 5 (final)
Mumbai	Nagpur	New Delhi
Wankhede Stadium	Vidarbha Cricket Association Stadium	Feroz Shah Kotla
Capacity: 33,808	Capacity: 45,000	Capacity: 40,715
Matches: 4 (semi-final)	Matches: 9	Matches: 4 (semi-final)

== Prize money ==
The 2016 ICC World Twenty20 declared a total prize money pool of $10 million for the tournament, 33% more than the 2014 edition. The prize money was distributed according to the performance of the teams as follows:

Stage	Prize money (US$)
Winners	$1.6 million
Runner-up	$800,000
Losing semi-finalists	$400,000 each
Bonus for winning every "Super 10 round" match	$50,000
Guaranteed Participation Bonus for all 16 teams	$300,000
Total	$10 million

== Warm-up matches ==
The following warm-up matches for the 2016 ICC World Twenty20 were played between 3 March and 15 March between all participants.

Matches

3 March 2016
15:00
Scorecard

Zimbabwe; 112/7 (20 overs)	v	Himachal Pradesh Cricket Association XI; 113/3 (14 overs)
Richmond Mutumbami 50* (51); Shresth Nirmohi 2/11 (4 overs)		Prashant Chopra 41 (25); Donald Tiripano 2/34 (4 overs)

Himachal Pradesh Cricket Association XI won by 7 wickets
Himachal Pradesh Cricket Association Stadium, Dharamshala
Umpires: Aleem Dar (Pak) and Richard Illingworth (Eng)
Player of the match: Donald Tiripano (Zim)

- Zimbabwe won the toss and elected to bat.

3 March 2016
19:30 (D/N)
Scorecard

Hong Kong; 120/7 (20 overs)	v	Ireland; 122/0 (12.2 overs)
Mark Chapman 64* (53); Tim Murtagh 2/21 (4 overs)		William Porterfield 75* (36)

Ireland won by 10 wickets
Himachal Pradesh Cricket Association Stadium, Dharamshala
Umpires: Marais Erasmus (SA) and Ian Gould (Eng)
Player of the match: William Porterfield (Ire)

- Hong Kong won the toss and elected to bat.

4 March 2016
15:00
Scorecard

Afghanistan; 152/9 (20 overs)	v	Netherlands; 136/4 (20 overs)
Samiullah Shenwari 42 (39); Vivian Kingma 2/30 (3 overs)		Tom Cooper 50* (37); Rashid Khan 1/7 (3 overs)

Afghanistan won by 16 runs
Punjab Cricket Association IS Bindra Stadium, Mohali
Umpires: Nigel Llong (Eng) and Sundaram Ravi (Ind)

- Afghanistan won the toss and elected to bat.

4 March 2016
19:30 (D/N)
Scorecard

Oman; 161/6 (20 overs)	v	Scotland; 147/7 (20 overs)
Zeeshan Maqsood 58 (42); Mark Watt 3/22 (4 overs)		George Munsey 48* (30); Ajay Lalcheta 3/26 (4 overs)

Oman won by 14 runs
Punjab Cricket Association IS Bindra Stadium, Mohali
Umpires: Chris Gaffaney (NZ) and Rod Tucker (Aus)

- Scotland won the toss and elected to field.

5 March 2016
15:00
Scorecard

Ireland; 155/8 (20 overs)	v	Zimbabwe; 160/4 (17.5 overs)
Gary Wilson 38 (35); Tendai Chatara 2/33 (4 overs)		Hamilton Masakadza 68* (49); Craig Young 1/18 (3 overs)

Zimbabwe won by 6 wickets
Himachal Pradesh Cricket Association Stadium, Dharamshala
Umpires: Ian Gould (Eng) and Richard Illingworth (Eng)
Player of the match: Hamilton Masakadza (Zim)

- Zimbabwe won the toss and elected to field.

5 March 2016
19:30 (D/N)
Scorecard

Himachal Pradesh Cricket Association XI; 105 (18.5 overs)	v	Hong Kong; 109/9 (20 overs)
Ankush Bains 31 (14); Nadeem Ahmed 3/15 (3.5 overs)		Ryan Campbell 46 (42); Sumeet Verma 3/5 (2 overs)

Hong Kong won by 1 wicket
Himachal Pradesh Cricket Association Stadium, Dharamshala
Umpires: Aleem Dar (Pak) and Marais Erasmus (SA)

- Hong Kong won the toss and elected to field.

6 March 2016
19:30 (D/N)
Scorecard

Netherlands; 133/3 (15.1 overs)	v	Scotland
Stephan Myburgh 58 (43); Safyaan Sharif 2/30 (3 overs)

No result
Punjab Cricket Association IS Bindra Stadium, Mohali
Umpires: Nigel Llong (Eng) and Rod Tucker (Aus)

- Scotland won the toss and elected to field.
- Rain stopped play in the 16th over of the Netherlands innings and no further play was possible.

6 March 2016
19:30 (D/N)
Scorecard

Afghanistan	v	Oman

Match abandoned without a ball bowled
Punjab Cricket Association IS Bindra Stadium, Mohali
Umpires: Chris Gaffaney (NZ) and Sundaram Ravi (Ind)

- No toss.
- Rain prevented any play from taking place.

10 March 2016
19:30 (D/N)
Scorecard

New Zealand; 226/4 (20 overs)	v	Sri Lanka; 152/7 (20 overs)
Colin Munro 67 (34); Dasun Shanaka 2/48 (4 overs)		Lahiru Thirimanne 41 (29); Adam Milne 3/26 (4 overs)

New Zealand won by 74 runs
Wankhede Stadium, Mumbai
Umpires: Michael Gough (Eng) and Vineet Kulkarni (Ind)

- New Zealand won the toss and elected to bat.

10 March 2016
19:30 (D/N)
Scorecard

India; 185/5 (20 overs)	v	West Indies; 140 (19.2 overs)
Rohit Sharma 98* (57); Jerome Taylor 2/26 (4 overs)		Chris Gayle 20 (11); Pawan Negi 2/15 (4 overs)

India won by 45 runs
Eden Gardens, Kolkata
Umpires: Richard Kettleborough (Eng) and Paul Reiffel (Aus)

- No toss. India batted first by mutual agreement.

12 March 2016
15:00
Scorecard

New Zealand; 169/8 (20 overs)	v	England; 170/4 (19.2 overs)
Kane Williamson 63 (39); Adil Rashid 3/15 (4 overs)		Jason Roy 55 (36); Mitchell Santner 2/24 (4 overs)

England won by 6 wickets
Wankhede Stadium, Mumbai
Umpires: Kumar Dharmasena (SL) and Ruchira Palliyaguruge (SL)

- New Zealand won the toss and elected to bat.

12 March 2016
15:00
Scorecard

Bengal	v	Pakistan

Match cancelled
Eden Gardens, Kolkata

12 March 2016
19:30 (D/N)
Scorecard

South Africa; 196/8 (20 overs)	v	India; 192/3 (20 overs)
Jean-Paul Duminy 67 (44); Hardik Pandya 3/36 (4 overs)		Shikhar Dhawan 73 (53); Imran Tahir 1/25 (3 overs)

South Africa won by 4 runs
Wankhede Stadium, Mumbai
Umpires: Kumar Dharmasena (SL) and Michael Gough (Eng)

- South Africa won the toss and elected to bat.

13 March 2016
15:00
Scorecard

Australia; 161/9 (20 overs)	v	West Indies; 162/7 (19.5 overs)
Shane Watson 60 (39); Dwayne Bravo 4/21 (4 overs)		Darren Sammy 50* (28); Josh Hazlewood 3/13 (4 overs)

West Indies won by 3 wickets
Eden Gardens, Kolkata
Umpires: Richard Kettleborough (Eng) and Bruce Oxenford (Aus)

- Australia won the toss and elected to bat.
- Josh Hazlewood (Aus) took a hat-trick with the wickets of Jason Holder, Marlon Samuels and Dwayne Bravo.

14 March 2016
15:00
Scorecard

England; 177/8 (20 overs)	v	Mumbai Cricket Association XI; 163/6 (20 overs)
Joe Root 48 (34); David Willey 3/35 (4 overs)		Jay Bista 51 (37); Reece Topley 2/26 (4 overs)

England won by 14 runs
Brabourne Stadium, Mumbai
Umpires: Vineet Kulkarni (Ind) and Pashchim Pathak (Ind)

- No toss. England batted first by mutual agreement.
- David Willey (playing for Mumbai) took a hat-trick with the wickets of Joe Root, Moeen Ali and Chris Jordan.

14 March 2016
15:00
Scorecard

Pakistan; 157/5 (20 overs)	v	Sri Lanka; 142/9 (20 overs)
Mohammad Hafeez 70* (49); Thisara Perera 2/21 (2 overs)		Lahiru Thirimanne 45 (37); Imad Wasim 4/25 (4 overs)

Pakistan won by 15 runs
Eden Gardens, Kolkata
Umpires: Bruce Oxenford (Aus) and Paul Reiffel (Aus)

- Pakistan won the toss and elected to bat.

15 March 2016
15:00
Scorecard

Mumbai Cricket Association XI; 188/4 (20 overs)	v	South Africa; 190/2 (17 overs)
Akhil Herwadkar 61 (45); Rilee Rossouw 1/13 (1 overs)		Faf du Plessis 65 (46); Shardul Thakur 1/19 (2 overs)

South Africa won by 8 wickets
Brabourne Stadium, Mumbai
Umpires: Anil Dandekar (Ind) and Vineet Kulkarni (Ind)

- South Africa won the toss and elected to field.

== First round ==
All times listed below are in Indian Standard Time (UTC+05:30).

Qualification	Teams
Full Members	Bangladesh
Full Members	Zimbabwe
Advanced from Qualifier	Afghanistan
Advanced from Qualifier	Hong Kong
Advanced from Qualifier	Ireland
Advanced from Qualifier	Netherlands
Advanced from Qualifier	Oman
Advanced from Qualifier	Scotland

=== Group A ===
Pos	Team	Pld	W	L	NR	Pts	NRR
1	Bangladesh	3	2	0	1	5	1.938
2	Netherlands	3	1	1	1	3	0.154
3	Oman	3	1	1	1	3	−0.685
4	Ireland	3	0	2	1	1	−0.685

Source: ESPN Cricinfo

Advance to Group 2

9 March
15:00 (D/N)
Scorecard

Bangladesh; 153/7 (20 overs)	v	Netherlands; 145/7 (20 overs)
Tamim Iqbal 83* (58); Timm van der Gugten 3/21 (4 overs)		Peter Borren 29 (28); Al-Amin Hossain 2/24 (3 overs)

Bangladesh won by 8 runs
Himachal Pradesh Cricket Association Stadium, Dharamshala
Umpires: Sundaram Ravi (Ind) and Rod Tucker (Aus)
Player of the match: Tamim Iqbal (Ban)

- Netherlands won the toss and elected to field.

9 March
19:30 (D/N)
Scorecard

Ireland; 154/5 (20 overs)	v	Oman; 157/8 (19.4 overs)
Gary Wilson 38 (34); Munis Ansari 3/37 (4 overs)		Zeeshan Maqsood 38 (33); Andy McBrine 2/15 (3 overs)

Oman won by 2 wickets
Himachal Pradesh Cricket Association Stadium, Dharamshala
Umpires: Chris Gaffaney (NZ) and Nigel Llong (Eng)
Player of the match: Amir Ali (Oma)

- Ireland won the toss and elected to bat.
- This was Oman's first victory in an ICC World T20 tournament.

11 March
15:00 (D/N)
Scorecard

Netherlands	v	Oman

No result
Himachal Pradesh Cricket Association Stadium, Dharamshala
Umpires: Chris Gaffaney (NZ) and Sundaram Ravi (Ind)

- Oman won the toss and elected to field.
- No play was possible due to rain.
- Netherlands were eliminated as a result of this match.

11 March
19:30 (D/N)
Scorecard

Bangladesh; 94/2 (8 overs)	v	Ireland
Tamim Iqbal 47 (26); George Dockrell 1/18 (2 overs)

No result
Himachal Pradesh Cricket Association Stadium, Dharamshala
Umpires: Nigel Llong (Eng) and Rod Tucker (Aus)

- Ireland won the toss and elected to field.
- The match was reduced to 12 overs per side due to rain.
- Rain stopped play in Bangladesh's innings and no further play was possible.
- Ireland were eliminated as a result of this match.

13 March
15:00 (D/N)
Scorecard

Netherlands; 59/5 (6 overs)	v	Ireland; 47/7 (6 overs)
Stephan Myburgh 27 (18); George Dockrell 3/7 (2 overs)		Paul Stirling 15 (7); Paul van Meekeren 4/11 (2 overs)

Netherlands won by 12 runs
Himachal Pradesh Cricket Association Stadium, Dharamshala
Umpires: Nigel Llong (Eng) and Sundaram Ravi (Ind)
Player of the match: Paul van Meekeren (Ned)

- Ireland won the toss and elected to field.
- The match was reduced to six overs per side due to rain.

13 March
19:30 (D/N)
Scorecard

Bangladesh; 180/2 (20 overs)	v	Oman; 65/9 (12 overs)
Tamim Iqbal 103* (63); Khawar Ali 1/24 (3 overs)		Jatinder Singh 25 (20); Shakib Al Hasan 4/15 (3 overs)

Bangladesh won by 54 runs (DLS method)
Himachal Pradesh Cricket Association Stadium, Dharamshala
Umpires: Chris Gaffaney (NZ) and Rod Tucker (Aus)
Player of the match: Tamim Iqbal (Ban)

- Oman won the toss and elected to field.
- Rain reduced Oman's innings to 12 overs with a target of 120 runs.
- Bangladesh qualified for the Super 10 stage of the tournament as a result of this match, while Oman were eliminated.
- Tamim Iqbal became the first player for Bangladesh and 18th overall to score a century in a T20I match. He also became the first player for Bangladesh and 25th overall to pass 1,000 runs in T20Is.

=== Group B ===
Pos	Team	Pld	W	L	NR	Pts	NRR
1	Afghanistan	3	3	0	0	6	1.540
2	Zimbabwe	3	2	1	0	4	−0.567
3	Scotland	3	1	2	0	2	−0.132
4	Hong Kong	3	0	3	0	0	−1.017

Source: ESPN Cricinfo

Advance to Group 1

8 March
15:00 (D/N)
Scorecard

Zimbabwe; 158/8 (20 overs)	v	Hong Kong; 144/6 (20 overs)
Vusi Sibanda 59 (46); Tanwir Afzal 2/19 (4 overs)		Jamie Atkinson 53 (44); Donald Tiripano 2/27 (4 overs)

Zimbabwe won by 14 runs
Vidarbha Cricket Association Stadium, Nagpur
Umpires: Aleem Dar (Pak) and Ian Gould (Eng)
Player of the match: Vusi Sibanda (Zim)

- Hong Kong won the toss and elected to field.
- Ryan Campbell (HK) became the oldest player to make his T20I debut (44 years and 30 days).

8 March
19:30 (D/N)
Scorecard

Afghanistan; 170/5 (20 overs)	v	Scotland; 156/5 (20 overs)
Mohammad Shahzad 61 (39); Alasdair Evans 1/24 (4 overs)		George Munsey 41 (29); Rashid Khan 2/28 (4 overs)

Afghanistan won by 14 runs
Vidarbha Cricket Association Stadium, Nagpur
Umpires: Marais Erasmus (SA) and Richard Illingworth (Eng)
Player of the match: Mohammad Shahzad (Afg)

- Afghanistan won the toss and elected to bat.

10 March
15:00 (D/N)
Scorecard

Zimbabwe; 147/7 (20 overs)	v	Scotland; 136 (19.4 overs)
Sean Williams 53 (36); Mark Watt 2/21 (4 overs)		Richie Berrington 36 (39); Wellington Masakadza 4/28 (4 overs)

Zimbabwe won by 11 runs
Vidarbha Cricket Association Stadium, Nagpur
Umpires: Aleem Dar (Pak) and Marais Erasmus (SA)
Player of the match: Wellington Masakadza (Zim)

- Zimbabwe won the toss and elected to bat.
- Scotland were eliminated as a result of this match.

10 March
19:30 (D/N)
Scorecard

Hong Kong; 116/6 (20 overs)	v	Afghanistan; 119/4 (18 overs)
Anshuman Rath 28 (31); Mohammad Nabi 4/20 (4 overs)		Mohammad Shahzad 41 (40); Ryan Campbell 2/28 (4 overs)

Afghanistan won by 6 wickets
Vidarbha Cricket Association Stadium, Nagpur
Umpires: Ian Gould (Eng) and Richard Illingworth (Eng)
Player of the match: Mohammad Nabi (Afg)

- Hong Kong won the toss and elected to bat.
- Hong Kong were eliminated as a result of this match.

12 March
15:00 (D/N)
Scorecard

Afghanistan; 186/6 (20 overs)	v	Zimbabwe; 127 (19.4 overs)
Mohammad Nabi 52 (32); Tinashe Panyangara 3/32 (4 overs)		Tinashe Panyangara 17* (7); Rashid Khan 3/11 (4 overs)

Afghanistan won by 59 runs
Vidarbha Cricket Association Stadium, Nagpur
Umpires: Aleem Dar (Pak) and Richard Illingworth (Eng)
Player of the match: Mohammad Nabi (Afg)

- Afghanistan won the toss and elected to bat.
- Afghanistan qualified for the Super 10 stage of the tournament as a result of this match, while Zimbabwe were eliminated.
- Afghanistan progressed to the second phase of a World Twenty20 tournament for the first time.

12 March
19:30 (D/N)
Scorecard

Hong Kong; 127/7 (20 overs)	v	Scotland; 78/2 (8 overs)
Mark Chapman 40 (41); Matt Machan 2/26 (4 overs)		Matthew Cross 22 (14); Aizaz Khan 1/11 (1 over)

Scotland won by 8 wickets (DLS method)
Vidarbha Cricket Association Stadium, Nagpur
Umpires: Marais Erasmus (SA) and Ian Gould (Eng)
Player of the match: Matt Machan (Sco)

- Hong Kong won the toss and elected to bat.
- Rain reduced Scotland's innings to 10 overs with a target of 76 runs.
- This was Scotland's first victory in an ICC tournament.

== Super 10 ==
Qualification	Super 10	
Qualification	Group 1	Group 2
Full Members	England	Australia
Full Members	South Africa	India
Full Members	Sri Lanka	New Zealand
Full Members	West Indies	Pakistan
Advanced from first round	Afghanistan	Bangladesh

=== Group 1 ===
Pos	Team	Pld	W	L	NR	Pts	NRR
1	West Indies	4	3	1	0	6	0.359
2	England	4	3	1	0	6	0.145
3	South Africa	4	2	2	0	4	0.651
4	Sri Lanka	4	1	3	0	2	−0.461
5	Afghanistan	4	1	3	0	2	−0.715

Source: ESPN Cricinfo

Advance to Knockout stage

16 March
19:30 (D/N)
Scorecard

England; 182/6 (20 overs)	v	West Indies; 183/4 (18.1 overs)
Joe Root 48 (36); Andre Russell 2/36 (4 overs)		Chris Gayle 100* (48); Adil Rashid 1/20 (2 overs)

West Indies won by 6 wickets
Wankhede Stadium, Mumbai
Umpires: Chris Gaffaney (NZ) and Rod Tucker (Aus)
Player of the match: Chris Gayle (WI)

- West Indies won the toss and elected to field.
- Chris Gayle (WI) scored the fastest century in a World Twenty20 match (47 balls).
- Chris Gayle became the second player to score two centuries in T20Is and first player to score two centuries in World Twenty20 tournaments. His eleven sixes is the most in an innings at the World Twenty20.
- Chris Gayle scored the most sixes in T20I matches (98) and the most sixes in World Twenty20 matches (60).

17 March
19:30 (D/N)
Scorecard

Afghanistan; 153/7 (20 overs)	v	Sri Lanka; 155/4 (18.5 overs)
Asghar Stanikzai 62 (47); Thisara Perera 3/33 (4 overs)		Tillakaratne Dilshan 83* (56); Mohammad Nabi 1/25 (4 overs)

Sri Lanka won by 6 wickets
Eden Gardens, Kolkata
Umpires: Bruce Oxenford (Aus) and Joel Wilson (WI)
Player of the match: Tillakaratne Dilshan (SL)

- Afghanistan won the toss and elected to bat.

18 March
19:30 (D/N)
Scorecard

South Africa; 229/4 (20 overs)	v	England; 230/8 (19.4 overs)
Hashim Amla 58 (31); Moeen Ali 2/34 (4 overs)		Joe Root 83 (44); Kyle Abbott 3/41 (3.4 overs)

England won by 2 wickets
Wankhede Stadium, Mumbai
Umpires: Sundaram Ravi (Ind) and Paul Reiffel (Aus)
Player of the match: Joe Root (Eng)

- England won the toss and elected to field.
- This was the highest successful run chase in a World Twenty20 match and the second highest in all T20I matches.
- England scored their first fifty runs from 17 balls, the joint second fastest in T20Is.
- Hashim Amla (SA) scored the most runs between dismissals in T20Is (224).
- Quinton de Kock equalled the record for the fastest fifty in T20Is for a South Africa player (21 balls).

20 March
15:00 (D/N)
Scorecard

South Africa; 209/5 (20 overs)	v	Afghanistan; 172 (20 overs)
AB de Villiers 64 (29); Amir Hamza 1/25 (3 overs)		Mohammad Shahzad 44 (19); Chris Morris 4/27 (4 overs)

South Africa won by 37 runs
Wankhede Stadium, Mumbai
Umpires: Chris Gaffaney (NZ) and Paul Reiffel (Aus)
Player of the match: Chris Morris (SA)

- South Africa won the toss and elected to bat.
- AB de Villiers (SA) scored the joint-second highest number of runs in one over in a World Twenty20 match (29).

20 March
19:30 (D/N)
Scorecard

Sri Lanka; 122/9 (20 overs)	v	West Indies; 127/3 (18.2 overs)
Thisara Perera 40 (29); Samuel Badree 3/12 (4 overs)		Andre Fletcher 84* (64); Milinda Siriwardana 2/33 (4 overs)

West Indies won by 7 wickets
M. Chinnaswamy Stadium, Bangalore
Umpires: Aleem Dar (Pak) and Johan Cloete (SA)
Player of the match: Andre Fletcher (WI)

- West Indies won the toss and elected to field.

23 March
15:00 (D/N)
Scorecard

England; 142/7 (20 overs)	v	Afghanistan; 127/9 (20 overs)
Moeen Ali 41* (33); Mohammad Nabi 2/17 (4 overs); Rashid Khan 2/17 (4 overs)		Shafiqullah 35* (20); Adil Rashid 2/18 (3 overs)

England won by 15 runs
Feroz Shah Kotla Ground, Delhi
Umpires: Sundaram Ravi (Ind) and Rod Tucker (Aus)
Player of the match: Moeen Ali (Eng)

- England won the toss and elected to bat.
- Afghanistan were eliminated as a result of this match.
- This was the first T20I match to be played at the Feroz Shah Kotla ground.

25 March
19:30 (D/N)
Scorecard

South Africa; 122/8 (20 overs)	v	West Indies; 123/7 (19.4 overs)
Quinton de Kock 47 (46); Chris Gayle 2/17 (3 overs)		Marlon Samuels 43 (44); Imran Tahir 2/13 (4 overs)

West Indies won by 3 wickets
Vidarbha Cricket Association Stadium, Nagpur
Umpires: Ian Gould (Eng) and Richard Kettleborough (Eng)
Player of the match: Marlon Samuels (WI)

- West Indies won the toss and elected to field.
- West Indies qualified for the semi-finals as a result of this match.
- Marlon Samuels became the second player for the West Indies to pass 1,000 runs in T20Is.
- Dwayne Bravo became the third player for the West Indies to pass 1,000 runs in T20Is.

26 March
19:30 (D/N)
Scorecard

England; 171/4 (20 overs)	v	Sri Lanka; 161/8 (20 overs)
Jos Buttler 66* (37); Jeffrey Vandersay 2/26 (4 overs)		Angelo Mathews 73* (54); Chris Jordan 4/28 (4 overs)

England won by 10 runs
Feroz Shah Kotla Ground, Delhi
Umpires: Paul Reiffel (Aus) and Rod Tucker (Aus)
Player of the match: Jos Buttler (Eng)

- Sri Lanka won the toss and elected to field.
- England qualified for the semi-finals as a result of this match, while Sri Lanka and South Africa were eliminated.

27 March
15:00 (D/N)
Scorecard

Afghanistan; 123/7 (20 overs)	v	West Indies; 117/8 (20 overs)
Najibullah Zadran 48 (40); Samuel Badree 3/14 (4 overs)		Dwayne Bravo 28 (29); Rashid Khan 2/26 (4 overs); Mohammad Nabi 2/26 (4 overs)

Afghanistan won by 6 runs
Vidarbha Cricket Association Stadium, Nagpur
Umpires: Aleem Dar (Pak) and Bruce Oxenford (Aus)
Player of the match: Najibullah Zadran (Afg)

- West Indies won the toss and elected to field.
- Evin Lewis (WI) made his T20I debut.
- Afghanistan's score was the second-lowest total successfully defended in a World Twenty20 match.
- It was the first time Afghanistan and West Indies played each other in an international fixture.

28 March
19:30 (D/N)
Scorecard

Sri Lanka; 120 (19.3 overs)	v	South Africa; 122/2 (17.4 overs)
Tillakaratne Dilshan 36 (40); Kyle Abbott 2/14 (3.3 overs)		Hashim Amla 56* (52); Suranga Lakmal 1/28 (3.4 overs)

South Africa won by 8 wickets
Feroz Shah Kotla Ground, Delhi
Umpires: Sundaram Ravi (Ind) and Rod Tucker (Aus)
Player of the match: Aaron Phangiso (SA)

- South Africa won the toss and elected to field.
- Tillakaratne Dilshan (SL) played in the most World Twenty20 matches (35).
- Hashim Amla became the fourth player for South Africa to pass 1,000 runs in T20Is.

=== Group 2 ===
Pos	Team	Pld	W	L	NR	Pts	NRR
1	New Zealand	4	4	0	0	8	1.900
2	India	4	3	1	0	6	−0.305
3	Australia	4	2	2	0	4	0.233
4	Pakistan	4	1	3	0	2	−0.093
5	Bangladesh	4	0	4	0	0	−1.805

Source: ESPN Cricinfo

Advance to Knockout stage

15 March
19:30 (D/N)
Scorecard

New Zealand; 126/7 (20 overs)	v	India; 79 (18.1 overs)
Corey Anderson 34 (42); Jasprit Bumrah 1/15 (4 overs)		MS Dhoni 30 (30); Mitchell Santner 4/11 (4 overs)

New Zealand won by 47 runs
Vidarbha Cricket Association Stadium, Nagpur
Umpires: Kumar Dharmasena (SL) and Richard Illingworth (Eng)
Player of the match: Mitchell Santner (NZ)

- New Zealand won the toss and elected to bat.
- Mitchell Santner recorded the best figures for a New Zealand spin bowler in T20Is.

16 March
15:00 (D/N)
Scorecard

Pakistan; 201/5 (20 overs)	v	Bangladesh; 146/6 (20 overs)
Mohammad Hafeez 64 (42); Taskin Ahmed 2/32 (4 overs)		Shakib Al Hasan 50* (40); Shahid Afridi 2/27 (4 overs)

Pakistan won by 55 runs
Eden Gardens, Kolkata
Umpires: Ian Gould (Eng) and Richard Kettleborough (Eng)
Player of the match: Shahid Afridi (Pak)

- Pakistan won the toss and elected to bat.
- Shakib Al Hasan became the second player for Bangladesh to pass 1,000 runs in T20Is.
- Shakib Al Hasan also became the second all-rounder to score 1,000 runs and take 50 wickets in T20Is.

18 March
15:00 (D/N)
Scorecard

New Zealand; 142/8 (20 overs)	v	Australia; 134/9 (20 overs)
Martin Guptill 39 (27); James Faulkner 2/18 (3 overs); Glenn Maxwell 2/18 (3 overs)		Usman Khawaja 38 (27); Mitchell McClenaghan 3/17 (3 overs)

New Zealand won by 8 runs
Himachal Pradesh Cricket Association Stadium, Dharamshala
Umpires: Marais Erasmus (SA) and Nigel Llong (Eng)
Player of the match: Mitchell McClenaghan (NZ)

- New Zealand won the toss and elected to bat.

19 March
19:30 (D/N)
Scorecard

Pakistan; 118/5 (18 overs)	v	India; 119/4 (15.5 overs)
Shoaib Malik 26 (16); Suresh Raina 1/4 (1 over)		Virat Kohli 55* (37); Mohammad Sami 2/17 (2 overs)

India won by 6 wickets
Eden Gardens, Kolkata
Umpires: Ian Gould (Eng) and Richard Kettleborough (Eng)
Player of the match: Virat Kohli (Ind)

- India won the toss and elected to field.
- The match was reduced to 18 overs per side due to rain.
- This was India's eleventh victory against Pakistan in ICC World Cup matches across both ODI and T20I formats.
- Ahmed Shehzad became the fifth player for Pakistan to pass 1,000 runs in T20Is.

21 March
19:30 (D/N)
Scorecard

Bangladesh; 156/5 (20 overs)	v	Australia; 157/7 (18.3 overs)
Mahmudullah 49* (29); Adam Zampa 3/23 (4 overs)		Usman Khawaja 58 (45); Shakib Al Hasan 3/27 (4 overs)

Australia won by 3 wickets
M. Chinnaswamy Stadium, Bengaluru
Umpires: Ian Gould (Eng) and Richard Kettleborough (Eng)
Player of the match: Adam Zampa (Aus)

- Australia won the toss and elected to field.
- Saqlain Sajib (Ban) made his T20I debut.
- David Warner (Aus) became the fourth player to score more than 6,000 runs in T20 cricket.

22 March
19:30 (D/N)
Scorecard

New Zealand; 180/5 (20 overs)	v	Pakistan; 158/5 (20 overs)
Martin Guptill 80 (48); Mohammad Sami 2/23 (4 overs)		Sharjeel Khan 47 (25); Adam Milne 2/25 (4 overs)

New Zealand won by 22 runs
I. S. Bindra Stadium, Mohali
Umpires: Richard Illingworth (Eng) and Nigel Llong (Eng)
Player of the match: Martin Guptill (NZ)

- New Zealand won the toss and elected to bat.
- New Zealand qualified for the semi-finals as a result of this match.
- Shahid Afridi (Pak) became the leading wicket-taker in World Twenty20 matches (39).

23 March
19:30 (D/N)
Scorecard

India; 146/7 (20 overs)	v	Bangladesh; 145/9 (20 overs)
Suresh Raina 30 (23); Mustafizur Rahman 2/34 (4 overs)		Tamim Iqbal 35 (32); Ravichandran Ashwin 2/20 (4 overs)

India won by 1 run
M. Chinnaswamy Stadium, Bengaluru
Umpires: Aleem Dar (Pak) and Bruce Oxenford (Aus)
Player of the match: Ravichandran Ashwin (Ind)

- Bangladesh won the toss and elected to field.
- Bangladesh were eliminated as a result of this match.
- This was the fourth one-run win in a World Twenty20 match.
- This was the first time three wickets fell from the last three balls for a chasing side in a T20I match.
- MS Dhoni became the fifth player for India to pass 1,000 runs in T20Is.

25 March
15:00 (D/N)
Scorecard

Australia; 193/4 (20 overs)	v	Pakistan; 172/8 (20 overs)
Steve Smith 61* (43); Imad Wasim 2/31 (4 overs)		Khalid Latif 46 (41); James Faulkner 5/28 (4 overs)

Australia won by 21 runs
I. S. Bindra Stadium, Mohali
Umpires: Kumar Dharmasena (SL) and Marais Erasmus (SA)
Player of the match: James Faulkner (Aus)

- Australia won the toss and elected to bat.
- Pakistan were eliminated as a result of this match.
- James Faulkner became the first bowler for Australia and 15th player overall to take a five-wicket haul in a T20I match.
- The 21-run victory was Australia's sixth smallest margin of victory in a T20I match by runs.

26 March
15:00 (D/N)
Scorecard

New Zealand; 145/8 (20 overs)	v	Bangladesh; 70 (15.4 overs)
Kane Williamson 42 (32); Mustafizur Rahman 5/22 (4 overs)		Shuvagata Hom 16* (17); Grant Elliott 3/12 (4 overs)

New Zealand won by 75 runs
Eden Gardens, Kolkata
Umpires: Johan Cloete (SA) and Michael Gough (Eng)
Player of the match: Kane Williamson (NZ)

- New Zealand won the toss and elected to bat.
- Henry Nicholls (NZ) made his T20I debut.
- Mustafizur Rahman became the second bowler for Bangladesh and 16th player overall to take a five-wicket haul in a T20I match.
- Bangladesh's total is their lowest total in a T20I match.
- Ten dismissals in this match were bowled, the most in a T20I match.

27 March
19:30 (D/N)
Scorecard

Australia; 160/6 (20 overs)	v	India; 161/4 (19.1 overs)
Aaron Finch 43 (34); Hardik Pandya 2/36 (4 overs)		Virat Kohli 82* (51); Shane Watson 2/23 (4 overs)

India won by 6 wickets
I. S. Bindra Stadium, Mohali
Umpires: Kumar Dharmasena (SL) and Marais Erasmus (SA)
Player of the match: Virat Kohli (Ind)

- Australia won the toss and elected to bat.
- India qualified for the semi-finals as a result of this match, while Australia were eliminated.
- Shane Watson (Aus) played in his last international match.
- Virat Kohli (Ind) reached 1,500 runs in T20Is in the fewest innings (39).
- Ravichandran Ashwin became first player for India to take 50 T20I wickets.
- MS Dhoni (Ind) took the most dismissals by a wicket-keeper in World Twenty20 matches (32).

== Knockout stage ==
Due to security concerns, the ICC stated that if Pakistan finished second in Group 2, the two semi final venues would be switched.

Semi-finals
②1	New Zealand	153/8 (20 overs)
①2	England	159/3 (17.1 overs)
①1	West Indies	196/3 (19.4 overs)
②2	India	192/2 (20 overs)

Final
①2	England	155/9 (20 overs)
①1	West Indies	161/6 (19.4 overs)

=== Semi-finals ===
30 March
19:00 (D/N)
Scorecard

New Zealand; 153/8 (20 overs)	v	England; 159/3 (17.1 overs)
Colin Munro 46 (32); Ben Stokes 3/26 (4 overs)		Jason Roy 78 (44); Ish Sodhi 2/42 (4 overs)

England won by 7 wickets
Feroz Shah Kotla, Delhi
Umpires: Kumar Dharmasena (SL) and Rod Tucker (Aus)
Player of the match: Jason Roy (Eng)

- England won the toss and elected to field.
- Jason Roy scored the second-fastest 50 for an England player in a World Twenty20 match (26 balls).
- Martin Guptill and Kane Williamson (NZ) became the second pair to add 1,000 runs in a partnership in T20Is.

31 March
19:00 (D/N)
Scorecard

India; 192/2 (20 overs)	v	West Indies; 196/3 (19.4 overs)
Virat Kohli 89* (47); Samuel Badree 1/26 (4 overs)		Lendl Simmons 82* (51); Virat Kohli 1/15 (1.4 overs)

West Indies won by 7 wickets
Wankhede Stadium, Mumbai
Umpires: Ian Gould (Eng) and Richard Kettleborough (Eng)
Player of the match: Lendl Simmons (WI)

- West Indies won the toss and elected to field.
- West Indies made the highest successful run chase in a knockout match of a World Twenty20 tournament.

=== Final ===
England and the West Indies were both contesting the tournament final for a second time, having won one previous tournament each (in 2010 and 2012, respectively). West Indian captain Darren Sammy won the toss and elected to bowl, as he had done throughout the tournament. England posted a total of 155/9 from their 20 overs, with Joe Root top-scoring with 54 runs from 36 balls. For the West Indies, Carlos Brathwaite took 3/23 and Samuel Badree took 2/16, including a maiden. The West Indies subsequently reached their target with just two balls to spare. They required 19 runs from the final over, bowled by Ben Stokes, which Brathwaite reached by hitting four consecutive sixes. Marlon Samuels scored 85 not out from 66 balls – the highest score in World T20 final history – and was named the final's Man of the Match for the second time. The match was played to a near-capacity crowd, with 66,000 people in attendance.

3 April
19:00 (D/N)
Scorecard

England; 155/9 (20 overs)	v	West Indies; 161/6 (19.4 overs)
Joe Root 54 (36); Carlos Brathwaite 3/23 (4 overs)		Marlon Samuels 85* (66); David Willey 3/20 (4 overs)

West Indies won by 4 wickets
Eden Gardens, Kolkata
Umpires: Kumar Dharmasena (SL) and Rod Tucker (Aus)
Player of the match: Marlon Samuels (WI)

- West Indies won the toss and elected to field.
- Marlon Samuels (WI) made the highest score in a World T20 final.
- West Indies became the first team to win both the men's and women's World Twenty20s on the same day, with the women defeating Australia by 8 wickets.
- Sulieman Benn played his final T20 game.

== Statistics ==
The leading run-scorer in the tournament was Tamim Iqbal, with 295, and the highest wicket-taker Mohammad Nabi with 12. The top-five in each category are:

=== Most runs ===
Player	Matches	Innings	Runs	Average	SR	HS	100	50	4s	6s
(Bangladesh) Tamim Iqbal	6	6	295	73.75	142.51	103*	1	1	24	14
(India) Virat Kohli	5	5	273	136.50	146.77	89*	0	3	29	5
(England) Joe Root	6	6	249	49.80	146.47	83	0	2	24	7
(Afghanistan) Mohammad Shahzad	7	7	222	31.71	140.50	61	0	1	23	12
(England) Jos Buttler	6	6	191	47.75	159.16	66*	0	1	13	12
Source: Cricinfo

=== Most wickets ===
Player	Matches	Innings	Wickets	Overs	Econ.	Ave.	BBI	S/R	4WI	5WI
(Afghanistan) Mohammad Nabi	7	7	12	27	6.07	13.66	4/20	13.4	1	0
(Afghanistan) Rashid Khan	7	7	11	28	6.53	16.63	3/11	15.2	0	0
(New Zealand) Mitchell Santner	5	5	10	18.1	6.27	11.40	4/11	10.9	1	0
(New Zealand) Ish Sodhi	5	5	10	19.4	6.10	12.00	3/18	11.8	0	0
(England) David Willey	6	6	10	21	7.57	15.90	3/20	12.6	0	0
Source: Cricinfo

== Team of the tournament ==
Player	Role
(Bangladesh) Tamim Iqbal	Batsman
(South Africa) Quinton de Kock	Batsman / Wicket-keeper
(India) Virat Kohli	Batsman / Captain
(England) Joe Root	Batsman
(England) Jos Buttler	Batsman
(Australia) Shane Watson	All-rounder
(Cricket West Indies) Andre Russell	All-rounder
(New Zealand) Mitchell Santner	Bowling all-rounder
(England) David Willey	Bowling all-rounder
(Cricket West Indies) Samuel Badree	Bowler
(India) Ashish Nehra	Bowler
(Bangladesh) Mustafizur Rahman	Bowler / 12th man
