= Charlie Plane =

Australian rules footballer

Personal information
- Full name: Charles Eric Plane
- Born: 20 March 1896; Rochester, Victoria
- Died: 7 February 1975 (aged 78); Toorak, Victoria
- Height: 183 cm (6 ft 0 in)
- Weight: 86 kg (190 lb)

Playing career^{1}
Years	Club	Games (Goals)
1922–25	Geelong	42 (5)
- ^{1} Playing statistics correct to the end of 1925.

Charles Eric Plane (20 March 1896 – 7 February 1975) was an Australian rules footballer who played with Geelong in the Victorian Football League (VFL).
