= Giacomo Lamplough =

Hong Kong cricketer

Personal information
- Full name: Giacomo Luigi Buonocore Lamplough
- Born: 11 November 1997 (age 29); Hong Kong
- Batting: Right-handed
- Bowling: Right-arm medium

International information
- National side: Hong Kong (2015)
- Source: CricketArchive, 29 January 2016

Giacomo Luigi Buonocore ('Guac') Lamplough (born 11 November 1997) is an international cricketer from Hong Kong who made his debut for the Hong Kong national team in 2015.

== Biography ==
Lamplough was born in Hong Kong to George Lamplough, a New Zealand-born lawyer, and his Italian wife. He was educated at South Island School, and plays domestically for the Hong Kong Cricket Club. Lamplough made his debut for Hong Kong in July 2015, playing a single match (against the United States) at the 2015 World Twenty20 Qualifier. Aged 17 at the time of his debut, he had only been called into the squad after another player, Waqas Barkat, a former vice-captain, had to withdraw from the team due to visa issues.
