= Harry Collins (footballer) =

Australian rules footballer

- Born: Harold Collins; 3 August 1892; Fitzroy, Victoria, Australia
- Died: 10 August 1918 (aged 26); Villers-Bretonneux, France
- Burial place: Heath Cemetery, Harbonnieres, France
- Relatives: Goldie Collins (brother); Norm Collins (brother)
- Military career
- Allegiance: Australia
- Branch: Australian Imperial Force
- Service years: 1915–1918
- Rank: Lieutenant
- Unit: 6th Battalion
- Conflicts: First World War; Western Front; Battle of Pozières; Battle of Passchendaele; Battle of the Menin Road Ridge; Hundred Days Offensive
- Awards: Distinguished Conduct Medal
Australian rules football career
Personal information
- Original team: Fitzroy Juniors
Playing career^{1}
Years	Club	Games (Goals)
1912, 1915	Fitzroy	6 (0)
- ^{1} Playing statistics correct to the end of 1915.

Harold Collins (3 August 1892 – 10 August 1918) was an Australian rules footballer who played with Fitzroy in the Victorian Football League. He was killed in action during the First World War.

== Family ==
His brothers, Goldie and Norm, both played for Fitzroy.

== Military service ==
Collins was awarded the Distinguished Conduct Medal for bravery, before being killed in action on 10 August 1918 in the First World War.

== See also ==
- List of Victorian Football League players who died on active service
