= Maurie Connell =

Australian rules footballer, born 1902

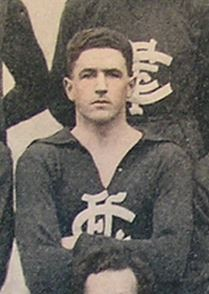
- Connell in 1928

Personal information
- Full name: Maurice Patrick Joseph Connell
- Born: 9 March 1902; Yarrawonga, Victoria
- Died: 4 February 1975 (aged 72); Wangaratta, Victoria
- Original team: St Pat's / University Blues
- Height: 183 cm (6 ft 0 in)
- Weight: 86 kg (190 lb)

Playing career^{1}
Years	Club	Games (Goals)
1922	South Melbourne	1 (0)
1925–29	Carlton	51 (18)
Total		52 (18)
- ^{1} Playing statistics correct to the end of 1929.

Maurice Patrick Joseph Connell (9 March 1902 – 4 February 1975) was an Australian rules footballer who played with Carlton and South Melbourne in the Victorian Football League (VFL).
