= Eric Peck =

Australian rules footballer

Personal information
- Full name: Eric Roy Peck
- Born: 1 August 1899; Avoca, Victoria
- Died: 18 July 1948 (aged 48); Brighton, Victoria
- Height: 175 cm (5 ft 9 in)
- Weight: 63 kg (139 lb)
- Position: Wing/Forward

Playing career^{1}
Years	Club	Games (Goals)
1917–21	Geelong	50 (9)
1922–23	Melbourne	6 (0)
1924	St Kilda	2 (0)
Total		58 (9)
- ^{1} Playing statistics correct to the end of 1924.

Eric Roy Peck (1 August 1899 – 18 July 1948) was an Australian rules footballer who played with Geelong, Melbourne and St Kilda in the Victorian Football League (VFL).
