= Harold Dunbar =

Australian rules footballer, born 1900

Personal information
- Full name: Harold Duncan Dunbar
- Born: 1 October 1900; Traralgon, Victoria
- Died: 12 June 1975 (aged 74); Kyneton, Victoria
- Original team: Carlsruhe

Playing career^{1}
Years	Club	Games (Goals)
1922	Melbourne	5 (2)
- ^{1} Playing statistics correct to the end of 1922.

Harold Duncan Dunbar (1 October 1900 – 12 June 1975) was an Australian rules footballer who played with Melbourne in the Victorian Football League (VFL).
