= Artie Cambridge =

Australian rules footballer, born 1901

Personal information
- Full name: Arthur Hill Cambridge
- Born: 25 December 1901; Bendigo, Victoria
- Died: 30 July 1955 (aged 53)
- Original team: South Bendigo

Playing career^{1}
Years	Club	Games (Goals)
1922	Melbourne	2 (0)
- ^{1} Playing statistics correct to the end of 1922.

Arthur Hill Cambridge (25 December 1901 – 30 July 1955) was an Australian rules footballer who played for the Melbourne Football Club in the Victorian Football League (VFL).
