= Goldie Collins =

Australian rules footballer, born 1901

Personal information
- Full name: Goldsmith Collins
- Born: 16 September 1901; Malvern, Victoria
- Died: 27 April 1982 (aged 80); Panton Hill, Victoria
- Original team: Fitzroy Juniors
- Height: 183 cm (6 ft 0 in)
- Weight: 86 kg (190 lb)

Playing career^{1}
| Years | Club | Games (Goals) |
| 1922–1928 | Fitzroy | 64 (9) |
- ^{1} Playing statistics correct to the end of 1928.

Career highlights
- VFL premiership: 1922; Fitzroy Club Champion: 1923

Goldsmith Collins (16 September 1901 – 27 April 1982) was an Australian rules footballer who played with Fitzroy in the VFL.

He made his debut with Fitzroy in 1922 and the following season was the club's best and fairest. His brothers, Harry and Norm both played for Fitzroy.

== Clashes with the law ==
=== Vexatious litigant ===
On 27 March 1953, on the basis of his having "instituted 40 litigations in the last five years", Collins was declared a vexatious litigant.

=== Contempt of court ===
Later that year, was jailed for four months, by the Supreme Court, for contempt of court, when he assaulted a detective who was attempting "to take him into custody to serve a term of one month imposed for an earlier contempt in writing insulting letters to judges of the court".

=== Violent behaviour ===
In April 1954, already in Pentridge Gaol, serving the earlier sentence, and, once again, charged with contempt of court, he put on such an extraordinary display (shouting insults at the judge, etc.) that the judge collapsed. Once the judge had recovered enough to be removed from the court, the Chief Justice, Sir Edmund Herring, was called to the court. Herring adjourned the hearing indefinitely and ordered that Collins be returned to Pentridge. Collins, then, "fought violently with two warders and a court policeman and was hand cuffed by Detective-Sergeant W. W. Mooney, who had joined in to help them".
