= Edgar Dunbar =

Australian rules footballer

Personal information
- Full name: Edgar John Dunbar
- Born: 12 April 1902; Traralgon, Victoria
- Died: 5 July 1985 (aged 83); Ballarat, Victoria
- Original team: Carlsruhe

Playing career^{1}
Years	Club	Games (Goals)
1922, 1924	Melbourne	28 (5)
- ^{1} Playing statistics correct to the end of 1924.

Edgar John Dunbar (12 April 1902 – 5 July 1985) was an Australian rules footballer who played with Melbourne in the Victorian Football League (VFL).
