= Tommy Law (Australian footballer) =

Australian rules footballer

Personal information
- Full name: Thomas Law
- Born: 8 March 1895; Shepparton, Victoria
- Died: 3 June 1937 (aged 42); Mooroopna, Victoria
- Original team: Shepparton (GVFL)
- Height: 173 cm (5 ft 8 in)

Playing career^{1}
Years	Club	Games (Goals)
1922	South Melbourne	2 (1)
- ^{1} Playing statistics correct to the end of 1922.

Thomas Law (8 March 1895 – 3 June 1937) was an Australian rules footballer who played with South Melbourne in the Victorian Football League (VFL).

Law, originally from Shepparton, made two appearances in the 1922 VFL season, as a half forward and wingman. He was one of six debutantes for South Melbourne in their opening round loss to Melbourne at Lake Oval and also played the following week, in a six-point win over Collingwood at Victoria Park. In 1923 he was granted a permit to Bendigo East.

On 3 June 1937, Law was traveling on the road between Dookie and Shepparton when his car struck a culvert, overturned and crashed into a fence. He suffered head injuries and died in Mooroopna Hospital, just minutes after being admitted.
