= Norm Collins =

Australian rules footballer

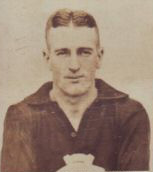

Personal information
- Full name: Norman Charles Collins
- Born: 7 May 1904; Malvern
- Died: 29 August 1933 (aged 29); Glen Iris, Victoria
- Original team: Fitzroy Juniors
- Height: 173 cm (5 ft 8 in)
- Weight: 68 kg (150 lb)

Playing career^{1}
Years	Club	Games (Goals)
1924–25	Fitzroy	4 (1)
1926–27, 1929–31	Carlton	57 (14)
1931–33	Hawthorn	31 (0)
Total		92 (15)
- ^{1} Playing statistics correct to the end of 1933.

Norman Charles Collins (7 May 1904 – 29 August 1933) was an Australian rules footballer who played with Fitzroy, Carlton and Hawthorn in the Victorian Football League (VFL).

== Football ==
=== Fitzroy (VFL) ===
Born in Malvern, Collins played his junior football for Fitzroy and in 1924 made his VFL debut, alongside his elder brother Goldie. Another brother, Harry, had also played at Fitzroy but was killed in 1918 while fighting in France.

Fitzroy had won a premiership in 1922.

=== Carlton (VFL) ===
As Collins found it difficult to break into the team, he transferred to Carlton after two seasons.

He was used initially at Carlton as a centreman but after sitting out of the 1928 VFL season the position had been taken up by new recruit Colin Martyn, he left and was captain coach of Daylesford in 1928.

When he returned in 1929, the former Fitzroy player was tried as a half forward flanker, rover and defender. He played finals that year, kicking two goals in Carlton's losing Preliminary Final team. However, he soon found himself out of favour and missed selection in the 1930 finals series and played only once in 1931.

=== Hawthorn (VFL) ===
Collins crossed to Hawthorn during the 1931 season where he played as a defender. He filled in as Hawthorn's captain on occasions.

== Death ==
In less than two months after his final game against Collingwood, where he sustained a career-ending injury, Collins died by suicide.
