= Hector Lingwood-Smith =

Australian rules footballer

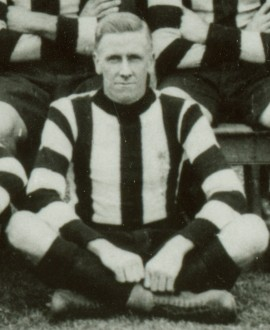
- Lingwood-Smith in 1922

Personal information
- Full name: Hector William Powell Lingwood-Smith
- Born: 22 May 1900; Adelaide, South Australia
- Died: 19 October 1972 (aged 72); Sandringham, Victoria
- Original team: Draper Memorial
- Height: 178 cm (5 ft 10 in)
- Weight: 66 kg (146 lb)

Playing career^{1}
Years	Club	Games (Goals)
1919–1920, 1926–1928	South Adelaide (SANFL)	56 (2)
1921	Sturt (SANFL)	7 (0)
1922–1923	Collingwood	13 (0)
- ^{1} Playing statistics correct to the end of 1928.

Hector William Powell Lingwood-Smith (22 May 1900 – 19 October 1972) was an Australian rules footballer who played with Collingwood in the Victorian Football League (VFL).

He also played and coached in Tasmania during the 1920s, being with Lefroy in 1924 and New Town in 1925.

Lingwood-Smith represented the TFL versus a South Australian combined side in Adelaide in 1925.
