= Ernie Dingwall =

Australian rules footballer

Personal information
- Full name: Ernest George Dingwall
- Born: 29 August 1898; Albert Park, Victoria
- Died: 7 October 1963 (aged 65); Castlemaine, Victoria
- Original team: Prahran
- Height: 173 cm (5 ft 8 in)
- Weight: 76 kg (168 lb)

Playing career^{1}
Years	Club	Games (Goals)
1922	Carlton	8 (1)
- ^{1} Playing statistics correct to the end of 1922.

Ernest George Dingwall (29 August 1898 – 7 October 1963) was an Australian rules footballer who played with Carlton in the Victorian Football League (VFL).
