= Ralph Raisbeck =

Australian rules footballer

Personal information
- Full name: Ralph Lumsden Raisbeck
- Born: 25 December 1898; Cheltenham, Victoria
- Died: 5 April 1958 (aged 59); Sorrento, Victoria
- Height: 183 cm (6 ft 0 in)
- Weight: 85 kg (187 lb)

Playing career^{1}
Years	Club	Games (Goals)
1922–23	Essendon	3 (0)
- ^{1} Playing statistics correct to the end of 1923.

Ralph Lumsden Raisbeck (25 December 1898 – 5 April 1958) was an Australian rules footballer who played with Essendon in the Victorian Football League (VFL).
