= Rupe Hannah =

Australian rules footballer, born 1900

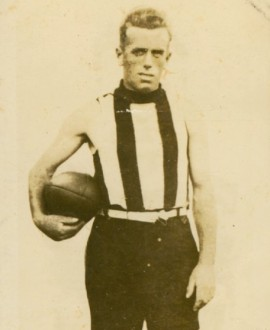
- Hannah during his Collingwood career

Personal information
- Full name: Rupert David Hannah
- Born: 30 July 1900; Carlton North, Victoria
- Died: 19 July 1983 (aged 82); Cheltenham, Victoria
- Original team: Ivanhoe
- Height: 180 cm (5 ft 11 in)
- Weight: 79 kg (174 lb)

Playing career^{1}
Years	Club	Games (Goals)
1922–24	Collingwood	14 (0)
- ^{1} Playing statistics correct to the end of 1924.

Rupert David Hannah (30 July 1900 – 19 July 1983) was an Australian rules footballer who played with Collingwood in the Victorian Football League (VFL).
