= Bill Peters (footballer) =

Australian rules footballer

Personal information
- Full name: Bill Peters
- Born: 26 March 1898
- Died: 6 December 1957 (aged 59)

Playing career^{1}
Years	Club	Games (Goals)
1922	South Melbourne	4 (0)
- ^{1} Playing statistics correct to the end of 1922.

Bill Peters (26 March 1898 – 6 December 1957) was an Australian rules footballer who played with South Melbourne in the Victorian Football League (VFL).
