= Sid Conlon =

Australian rules footballer

Personal information
- Full name: Sydney Vincent Conlon
- Born: 9 October 1898; South Melbourne, Victoria
- Died: 22 May 1950 (aged 51); Heidelberg, Victoria
- Original team: South Melbourne CYMS (CYMSFA)

Playing career^{1}
Years	Club	Games (Goals)
1922	South Melbourne	4 (3)
- ^{1} Playing statistics correct to the end of 1922.

Sydney Vincent Conlon (9 October 1898 – 22 May 1950) was an Australian rules footballer who played with South Melbourne in the Victorian Football League (VFL).
