= Timothy Surujbally =

Trinidadian-born American cricketer

Personal information
- Full name: Timothy Nicholas Surujbally
- Born: May 25, 1984 (age 42); San Fernando, Trinidad and Tobago
- Batting: Right-handed
- Bowling: Right-arm off spin

International information
- National side: United States (2012–2015)

Career statistics
Competition	T20
Matches	1
Runs scored	3
Batting average	3.00
100s/50s	0/0
Top score	3
Catches/stumpings	0/–
- Source: CricketArchive, July 13, 2015

Timothy Nicholas Surujbally (born May 25, 1984) is an American cricketer of Trinidadian origin who made his debut for the U. S. national side in November 2012. He is a right-handed batsman and occasional right-arm off spin bowler.

Born in San Fernando, Trinidad, Surujbally emigrated to the United States in 2007, settling in Florida. His club cricket has been played in Miami, for teams in the South Florida Cricket Alliance and the Florida Southeast Cricket League. In November 2012, Surujbally made his international debut for the U.S. in the annual Auty Cup series against Canada. He was retained in the side for the 2013 Americas Twenty20 Championship the following year, and featured in five of a possible eight matches, with a best of 44 against Suriname. Surujbally also featured in the 2013 Auty Cup series, but was not again selected in a national squad until 22015, when he replaced Steven Taylor (a late withdrawal) in the squad for the 2015 World Twenty20 Qualifier in Ireland and Scotland. He went on to make his full Twenty20 debut in the third match of the tournament, against Namibia.

In June 2021, he was selected to take part in the Minor League Cricket tournament in the United States following the players' draft.
