= George Tory =

Australian rules footballer

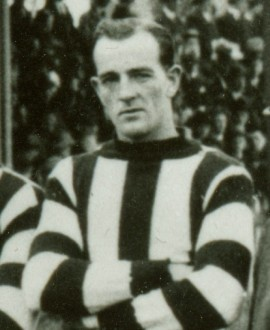
- Tory in 1922

Personal information
- Full name: George Patrick Tory
- Born: 3 June 1899; Omeo, Victoria
- Died: 29 March 1952 (aged 52); Barham, New South Wales
- Original team: Collingwood District
- Height: 177 cm (5 ft 10 in)
- Weight: 71 kg (157 lb)

Playing career^{1}
Years	Club	Games (Goals)
1922	Collingwood	2 (1)
- ^{1} Playing statistics correct to the end of 1922.

George Patrick Tory (3 June 1899 – 29 March 1952) was an Australian rules footballer who played with Collingwood in the Victorian Football League (VFL).

He later played for Hawthorn in the Victorian Football Association (VFA).
