= Stan Cooper (footballer) =

Australian rules footballer

Personal information
- Full name: William Stanley Cooper
- Born: 8 April 1899; Malvern, Victoria
- Died: 14 February 1984 (aged 84); Yea, Victoria
- Original team: Swan Hill

Playing career^{1}
Years	Club	Games (Goals)
1922	St Kilda	2 (0)
- ^{1} Playing statistics correct to the end of 1922.

William Stanley Cooper (8 April 1899 – 14 February 1984) was an Australian rules footballer who played with St Kilda in the Victorian Football League (VFL).
