= Matt Connors =

Australian rules footballer

Personal information
- Full name: Matthew Thomas Connors
- Born: 23 October 1894; Lancefield, Victoria
- Died: 16 December 1948 (aged 54); Heidelberg, Victoria
- Original team: Shepparton
- Height: 180 cm (5 ft 11 in)

Playing career^{1}
Years	Club	Games (Goals)
1919	Melbourne	3 (0)
1922–23	Richmond	6 (3)
Total		9 (3)
- ^{1} Playing statistics correct to the end of 1923.

Matthew Thomas Connors (23 October 1894 – 16 December 1948) was an Australian rules footballer who played with Melbourne and Richmond in the Victorian Football League (VFL). He later returned to original team, Shepparton, and won a premiership with them in 1927.
