= Orville Lamplough =

Australian rules footballer

Personal information
- Full name: Orville Lamplough
- Born: 13 March 1897; Donald, Victoria
- Died: 19 July 1968 (aged 71); Heidelberg, Victoria
- Original team: Elsternwick

Playing career^{1}
Years	Club	Games (Goals)
1922–23	St Kilda	7 (6)
- ^{1} Playing statistics correct to the end of 1923.

Orville Lamplough DFC (13 March 1897 – 19 July 1968) was an Australian rules footballer who played with St Kilda in the Victorian Football League (VFL).

He served with the Australian Flying Corps in the First World War, earning the Distinguished Flying Cross in 1919 Birthday Honours.
