= Les Warren (footballer) =

Australian rules footballer

Personal information
- Full name: Les Warren
- Born: 22 September 1896
- Died: 9 October 1972 (aged 76)
- Original team: Preston Juniors
- Height: 175 cm (5 ft 9 in)
- Weight: 72 kg (159 lb)

Playing career^{1}
Years	Club	Games (Goals)
1922–27	Fitzroy	40 (0)
- ^{1} Playing statistics correct to the end of 1927.

Les Warren (22 September 1896 – 9 October 1972) was an Australian rules footballer who played with Fitzroy in the Victorian Football League (VFL).
