= Charles Wall (footballer) =

Australian rules footballer

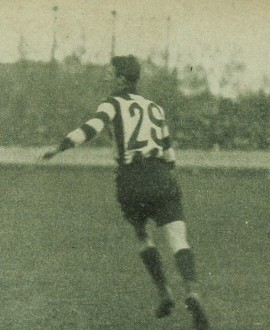
- Wall in 1922

Personal information
- Full name: Charles Walter Wall
- Born: 21 June 1895; Heidelberg, Victoria
- Died: 25 August 1965 (aged 70); Heidelberg West, Victoria
- Original team: Ivanhoe
- Height: 183 cm (6 ft 0 in)
- Weight: 77 kg (170 lb)

Playing career^{1}
Years	Club	Games (Goals)
1922	Collingwood	1 (0)
- ^{1} Playing statistics correct to the end of 1922.

Charles Walter Wall (21 June 1895 – 25 August 1965) was an Australian rules footballer who played with Collingwood in the Victorian Football League (VFL).
