= 2013 Americas Twenty20 Division One =

2013 ICC World Cricket League Americas Region Twenty20 Division One
- Administrator: International Cricket Council
- Cricket format: Twenty20
- Tournament format: Round-robin
- Host: United States
- Champions: United States
- Participants: 5
- Matches: 20
- Player of the series: (Bermuda) Janeiro Tucker
- Most runs: (United States) Steven Taylor (413)
- Most wickets: (Bermuda) Malachi Jones (13)
- Official website: ICC Americas Region

The 2013 ICC Americas Twenty20 Division One is a cricket tournament that took place between 18 and 24 March 2013. The United States hosted the event, with all matches played at the Central Broward Regional Park in Lauderhill, Florida.

== Teams ==
Teams that qualified are as follows:

- Bahamas
- Bermuda
- Cayman Islands
- Suriname
- United States

== Squads ==
Bahamas	Bermuda	Cayman Islands	Suriname	United States
Gregory Taylor (c); Whitcliff Atkinson (wk); Jonathan Barry; Turan Brown; Narendra Ekanayake; Rudolph Fox; Dereck Gittens; Jagnauth Jagroo; Julio Jemison (wk); Andrew Nash; Albert Peters; Ryan Tappin; Marc Taylor; Dwight Weakley	Steven Outerbridge (c); Jason Anderson (wk); Lionel Cann; Jekon Edness (wk); David Hemp; Malachi Jones; Kamau Leverock; Tre Manders; Greg Maybury; Jacobi Robinson; Sam Robinson; Dion Stovell; Rodney Trott; Janeiro Tucker	Abali Hoilett (c); Kevin Bazil; Marlon Bryan; Kervin Ebanks; Ronald Ebanks; Vincent Ebanks; Jalon Linton; Zachary McLaughlin; Alessandro Morris; Ian Rotsey; Ramon Sealy; Troy Taylor; Omar Willis (wk); Conroy Wright	Mohindra Boodram (c); Charles Douglas; Sauid Drepaul; Troy Dudnath; Arun Gokoel; Giovani Gokoel; Kemraj Hardat (wk); Tariq Islam; Radjeev Jagroep; Sanjeev Mangroo; Andre Percival; Shazam Ramjohn; Deoraj Sewanan; Vishwar Shaw	Orlando Baker (c); Danial Ahmed; Barrington Bartley; Ryan Corns; Akeem Dodson (wk); Naseer Jamali; Karan Ganesh; Elmore Hutchinson; Japen Patel; Abhimanyu Rajp; Saqib Saleem; Nicholas Standford; Timothy Surujbally; Steven Taylor (wk)

== Fixtures ==
=== Points Table ===
Teams that qualified for 2013 ICC World Twenty20 Qualifier
Team relegated to 2014 Americas Division Two

Team	P	W	L	T	NR	Pts	NRR
United States	8	8	0	0	0	16	+2.874
Bermuda	8	5	3	0	0	10	+0.948
Suriname	8	4	4	0	0	8	-0.423
Bahamas	8	2	6	0	0	4	-1.782
Cayman Islands	8	1	7	0	0	2	-1.836

=== Matches ===
18 March
10:00 AM
Scorecard

United States; 185/4 (20 overs)	v	Cayman Islands; 85/5 (20 overs)
Steven Taylor 95 (58); Kervin Ebanks 2/26 (4 overs)		Conroy Wright 36* (42); Japen Patel 2/7 (2 overs)

United States of America won by 100 runs
Central Broward Regional Park, Lauderhill, Florida
Umpires: Sameer Bandekar (Ind) and Roger Dill (Ber)
Player of the match: Steven Taylor (USA)

- United States of America won the toss and elected to bat.

18 March
10:00 AM
Scorecard

Bermuda; 192/4 (20 overs)	v	Bahamas; 65 (17.4 overs)
Dion Stovell 71* (56); Albert Peters 3/26 (4 overs)		Narendra Ekanayake 14 (22); Malachi Jones 3/6 (3 overs)

Bermuda won by 127 runs
Brian Piccolo Park, Fort Lauderdale, Florida
Umpires: Hubert Smythe (Cay) and Umar Babary (Can)
Player of the match: Dion Stovell (Ber)

- Bermuda won the toss and elected to field.

18 March
3:00 PM
Scorecard

United States; 171/4 (20 overs)	v	Suriname; 92/7 (20 overs)
Akeem Dodson 54* (40); Arun Gokoel 2/38 (4 overs)		Sauid Drepaul 31 (29); Danial Ahmed 2/12 (4 overs)

United States of America won by 79 runs
Central Broward Regional Park, Lauderhill, Florida
Umpires: Richard Austin (Ber) and Sameer Bandekar (Ind)
Player of the match: Akeem Dodson (USA)

- United States of America won the toss and elected to bat.

18 March
3:00 PM
Scorecard

Bahamas; 97 (19.3 overs)	v	Cayman Islands; 45/2 (8 overs)
Marc Taylor 23 (22); Alessandro Morris 6/13 (3.3 overs)		Ramon Sealy 36* (29); Jonathan Barry 2/20 (4 overs)

Cayman Islands won by 10 runs (D/L)
Brian Piccolo Park, Fort Lauderdale, Florida
Umpires: Hubert Smythe (Cay) and Umar Babary (Can)
Player of the match: Alessandro Morris (Cay)

- Cayman Islands won the toss and elected to field.
- Rain stopped play after 8 overs in Cayman Islands' innings, revising the target to 36 runs from 8 overs via the Duckworth–Lewis method.

19 March
10:00 AM
Scorecard

Suriname; 138/8 (20 overs)	v	Bermuda; 142/4 (18.4 overs)
Shazam Ramjohn 42 (25); Rodney Trott 3/17 (4 overs)		Janeiro Tucker 65* (30); Troy Dudnath 2/27 (3 overs)

Bermuda won by 6 wickets
Central Broward Regional Park, Lauderhill, Florida
Umpires: Sameer Bandekar (Ind) and Hubert Smythe (Cay)
Player of the match: Janeiro Tucker (Ber)

- Suriname won the toss and elected to bat.

19 March
3:00 PM
Scorecard

Bahamas; 113/7 (20 overs)	v	United States; 114/2 (14.3 overs)
Turan Brown 31 (16); Barrington Bartley 2/9 (3 overs)		Ryan Corns 61* (43); Dereck Gittens 1/30 (4 overs)

United States of America won by 8 wickets
Central Broward Regional Park, Lauderhill, Florida
Umpires: Richard Austin (Ber) and Roger Dill (Ber)
Player of the match: Ryan Corns (USA)

- Bahamas won the toss and elected to bat.

20 March
10:00 AM
Scorecard

Bermuda; 169/3 (20 overs)	v	Cayman Islands; 123/9 (20 overs)
Steven Outerbridge 59 (47); Alessandro Morris 1/20 (4 overs)		Ian Rotsey 32 (39); Janeiro Tucker 3/22 (4 overs)

Bermuda won by 46 runs
Central Broward Regional Park, Lauderhill, Florida
Umpires: Sameer Bandekar (Ind) and Umar Babary (Can)
Player of the match: Janeiro Tucker (Ber)

- Cayman Islands won the toss and elected to field.

20 March
10:00 AM
Scorecard

Suriname; 121/9 (20 overs)	v	Bahamas; 101/8 (20 overs)
Shazam Ramjohn 32 (30); Narendra Ekanayake 3/18 (4 overs)		Marc Taylor 43 (44); Sauid Drepaul 4/29 (4 overs)

Suriname won by 20 runs
Brian Piccolo Park, Fort Lauderdale, Florida
Umpires: Richard Austin (Ber) and Roger Dill (Ber)
Player of the match: Sauid Drepaul (Sur)

- Suriname won the toss and elected to bat.

20 March
3:00 PM
Scorecard

Bermuda; 133/8 (20 overs)	v	United States; 134/7 (18.1 overs)
Janeiro Tucker 36 (31); Danial Ahmed 3/26 (4 overs)		Nicholas Standford 36 (27); Malachi Jones 3/22 (4 overs)

United States of America won by 3 wickets
Central Broward Regional Park, Lauderhill, Florida
Umpires: Sameer Bandekar (Ind) and Umar Babary (Can)
Player of the match: Malachi Jones (Ber)

- Bermuda won the toss and elected to bat.

20 March
3:00 PM
Scorecard

Suriname; 120/8 (20 overs)	v	Cayman Islands; 96/4 (17 overs)
Arun Gokoel 47 (51); Kervin Ebanks 2/21 (4 overs)		Ramon Sealy 38 (39); Mohindra Boodram 3/26 (4 overs)

Suriname won by 7 runs (D/L)
Brian Piccolo Park, Fort Lauderdale, Florida
Umpires: Roger Dill (Ber) and Hubert Smythe (Cay)
Player of the match: Sauid Drepaul (Sur)

- Suriname won the toss and elected to bat.
- Rain stopped play after 7.3 overs in Cayman Islands' innings, revising the target to 104 runs from 17 overs via the Duckworth–Lewis method.

21 March
10:00 AM
Scorecard

Cayman Islands; 122/9 (20 overs)	v	Bahamas; 123/1 (16.1 overs)
Ronald Ebanks 45 (35); Marc Taylor 2/5 (1 over)		Marc Taylor 89* (61); Zachary McLaughlin 1/9 (2 overs)

Bahamas won by 9 wickets
Central Broward Regional Park, Lauderhill, Florida
Umpires: Richard Austin (Ber) and Umar Babary (Can)
Player of the match: Marc Taylor (Bah)

- Bahamas won the toss and elected to field.

21 March
3:00 PM
Scorecard

Suriname; 110/6 (20 overs)	v	United States; 111/4 (18.5 overs)
Charles Douglas 23 (27); Ryan Corns 1/23 (4 overs)		Japen Patel 27* (25); Arun Gokoel 1/19 (3 overs)

United States of America won by 6 wickets
Central Broward Regional Park, Lauderhill, Florida
Umpires: Roger Dill (Ber) and Hubert Smythe (Cay)
Player of the match: Japen Patel (USA)

- Suriname won the toss and elected to bat.

22 March
10:00 AM
Scorecard

United States; 187/6 (20 overs)	v	Bahamas; 115/8 (20 overs)
Orlando Baker 32 (30); Dereck Gittens 2/53 (4 overs)		Julio Jemison 52* (54); Steven Taylor 2/0 (1 over)

United States of America won by 72 runs
Central Broward Regional Park, Lauderhill, Florida
Umpires: Sylvan Taylor (USA) and Umar Babary (Can)
Player of the match: Barrington Bartley (USA)

- United States of America won the toss and elected to bat.

22 March
10:00 AM
Scorecard

Cayman Islands; 118/6 (20 overs)	v	Bermuda; 119/5 (19.2 overs)
Omar Willis 28 (22); Janeiro Tucker 3/19 (4 overs)		Lionel Cann 44 (28); Kervin Ebanks 2/28 (4 overs)

Bermuda won by 5 wickets
Brian Piccolo Park, Fort Lauderdale, Florida
Umpires: Sameer Bandekar (Ind) and Hubert Smythe (Cay)
Player of the match: Lionel Cann (Ber)

- Bermuda won the toss and elected to field.

22 March
3:00 PM
Scorecard

Suriname; 147/6 (20 overs)	v	Bahamas; 151/4 (19.2 overs)
Charles Douglas 52* (54); Albert Peters 2/18 (4 overs)		Ryan Tappin 55 (51); Shazam Ramjohn 2/31 (4 overs)

Bahamas won by 6 wickets
Central Broward Regional Park, Lauderhill, Florida
Umpires: Richard Austin (Ber) and Sylvan Taylor (USA)
Player of the match: Ryan Tappin (Bah)

- Bahamas won the toss and elected to field.

22 March
3:00 PM
Scorecard

United States; 184/4 (20 overs)	v	Bermuda; 113/8 (17 overs)
Steven Taylor 101 (62); Malachi Jones 2/43 (4 overs)		Janeiro Tucker 27 (24); Abhimanyu Rajp 3/17 (3 overs)

United States of America won by 48 runs (D/L)
Brian Piccolo Park, Fort Lauderdale, Florida
Umpires: Sameer Bandekar (Ind) and Roger Dill (Ber)
Player of the match: Steven Taylor (USA)

- United States of America won the toss and elected to bat.
- Rain stopped play after United States of America's innings, revising the target to 162 runs from 17 overs via the Duckworth–Lewis method.

23 March
10:00 AM
Scorecard

Bermuda; 168/3 (20 overs)	v	Bahamas; 145/7 (20 overs)
Janeiro Tucker 79* (48); Albert Peters 2/18 (4 overs)		Jonathan Barry 43 (30); Malachi Jones 2/20 (4 overs)

Bermuda won by 23 runs
Central Broward Regional Park, Lauderhill, Florida
Umpires: Richard Austin (Ber) and Sylvan Taylor (USA)
Player of the match: Janeiro Tucker (Ber)

- Bahamas won the toss and elected to field.

23 March
3:00 PM
Scorecard

Suriname; 137/6 (20 overs)	v	Cayman Islands; 127/8 (20 overs)
Troy Dudnath 60* (31); Alessandro Morris 3/18 (4 overs)		Ronald Ebanks 33 (25); Mohindra Boodram 3/17 (4 overs)

Suriname won by 10 runs
Central Broward Regional Park, Lauderhill, Florida
Umpires: Roger Dill (Ber) and Sylvan Taylor (USA)
Player of the match: Troy Dudnath (Sur)

- Suriname won the toss and elected to bat.

24 March
10:00 AM
Scorecard

United States; 198/1 (20 overs)	v	Cayman Islands; 121/6 (20 overs)
Steven Taylor 127* (62); Kervin Ebanks 1/36 (4 overs)		Zachary McLaughlin 35 (34); Ryan Corns 3/12 (3 overs)

United States of America won by 77 runs
Central Broward Regional Park, Lauderhill, Florida
Umpires: Richard Austin (Ber) and Umar Babary (Can)
Player of the match: Steven Taylor (USA)

- United States of America won the toss and elected to bat.
- United States of America won the 2013 ICC World Cricket League Americas Region Twenty20 Division One as a result of this match.

24 March
3:00 PM
Scorecard

Bermuda; 144/4 (20 overs)	v	Suriname; 148/5 (19.4 overs)
David Hemp 51* (47); Sauid Drepaul 3/37 (4 overs)		Sauid Drepaul 42 (40); Janeiro Tucker 2/27 (4 overs)

Suriname won by 5 wickets
Central Broward Regional Park, Lauderhill, Florida
Umpires: Hubert Smythe (Cay) and Sylvan Taylor (USA)
Player of the match: Sauid Drepaul (Sur)

- Bermuda won the toss and elected to bat.

== Statistics ==
=== Most Runs ===
The top five run scorers (total runs) are included in this table.

Player	Team	Runs	Inns	Avg	S/R	HS	100s	50s
Steven Taylor	United States	413	8	59.00	160.70	127*	2	1
Janeiro Tucker	Bermuda	304	8	60.80	171.75	79*	0	2
Marc Taylor	Bahamas	233	8	33.28	118.27	89*	0	1
David Hemp	Bermuda	229	8	45.80	97.86	66	0	3
Sauid Drepaul	Suriname	203	8	26.87	108.58	42	0	0

=== Most Wickets ===
The top five wicket takers (total wickets) are listed in this table.

Player	Team	Wkts	Mts	Ave	S/R	Econ	BBI
Malachi Jones	Bermuda	13	8	12.76	14.3	5.35	3/6
Janeiro Tucker	Bermuda	13	8	13.07	13.8	5.66	3/19
Sauid Drepaul	Suriname	13	8	15.15	13.9	6.53	4/29
Alessandro Morris	Cayman Islands	12	8	16.33	13.7	7.12	6/13
Ryan Corns	United States	10	7	12.80	12.6	6.09	3/12

== See also ==
- 2013 ICC World Twenty20 Qualifier
