= Danial Ahmed =

Pakistani-born American cricketer

Danial Asif Ahmed (born 27 January 1985) is a Pakistani-American cricketer. He made his debut for the American national side in November 2012, and has since played regularly at international level.

Born in Lahore, Ahmed first played for the United States in the annual Auty Cup match against Canada in November 2012. His first international tournament for the team was the 2013 Americas Twenty20 Division One tournament, played in Florida in March 2013, where he took nine wickets in seven matches (behind only Ryan Corns for the U.S.) bowling left-arm orthodox spin. He then played a single match, the third-place playoff against Bermuda, in the 2013 WCL Division Three tournament in Bermuda, but went wicketless. At the 2013 ICC World Twenty20 Qualifier in the United Arab Emirates, Ahmed led the U.S.'s bowling with ten wickets, despite only featuring in four of a possible eight games. His best performance came in the 15th-place playoff against Denmark, where he took 5/18 from his four overs to bowl the U.S. to victory. Matches at that tournament had formal Twenty20 status. Ahmed has since also appeared for the U.S. in the 2014 WCL Division Three tournament, and has been selected in the U.S. squad for the 2015 Americas Twenty20 Championship.
