= Andrew Hicks =

Andrew Hicks may refer to:

- Andrew Hicks (cricketer)
- Andrew Hicks (politician)
- Andy Hicks, English snooker player
