= 2013 World Twenty20 Qualifier =

2013 ICC World Twenty20 Qualifier
- Tournament logo
- Dates: 15 November 2013 – 30 November 2013
- Administrator: International Cricket Council
- Cricket format: Twenty20 International, Twenty20
- Tournament format(s): Round-robin and playoffs
- Host: United Arab Emirates
- Champions: Ireland (3rd title)
- Participants: 16
- Matches: 72
- Player of the series: (Afghanistan) Samiullah Shenwari
- Most runs: (Scotland) Matt Machan (364)
- Most wickets: (Netherlands) Ahsan Malik (21)
- Official website: Official website

The 2013 ICC World Twenty20 Qualifier was played in November 2013 in the United Arab Emirates and is a part of the ICC World Twenty20 Qualifier series. This edition of the qualifier for the 2014 ICC World Twenty20 was an expanded version comprising ten qualifiers from regional Twenty20 tournaments in addition to the top six finishers of the previous edition. The groups were announced by the ICC on 7 August 2013.

Ireland met Afghanistan in the final for the third time with Ireland winning their 2nd title against Afghanistan and 3rd title overall. The top 6 nations (previously 2) qualified for the 2014 ICC World Twenty20: Ireland, Afghanistan, Netherlands and making their World Twenty20 debut the UAE, Nepal and Hong Kong.

== Format ==
The tournament runs for 16 days with 72 fixtures amongst 16 teams, divided into two groups of eight. Each group plays a round-robin tournament. The bottom three teams of each group are immediately eliminated from contention for the top six positions but will play matches to determine which teams finish in positions 11 to 16. The top three teams from each group compete in the first place playoffs to determine the teams finishing in the top four positions. The other two teams are relegated to the fifth place playoffs where they compete with the fourth- and fifth-ranked teams from each group for the positions of five to ten. Both the first and fifth place playoffs are played in a six-team, single-elimination format. The bottom four teams play in the quarter-finals. The winners of the quarter-finals compete with the top two teams in the semi-finals. Playoffs follow to determine the finishing positions of the teams. The top six teams qualify for the 2014 ICC World Twenty20. They will join the hosts Bangladesh and Zimbabwe in the preliminary group stage, from which only two teams will advance.

== Qualification ==
=== Regional qualification ===
Team	Qualification	Region	Group
Ireland	2012 ICC World Twenty20 Qualifier	Europe	A
Scotland	2012 ICC World Twenty20 Qualifier	Europe	B
Netherlands	2012 ICC World Twenty20 Qualifier	Europe	B
Afghanistan	2012 ICC World Twenty20 Qualifier	Asia	B
Canada	2012 ICC World Twenty20 Qualifier	Americas	A
Namibia	2012 ICC World Twenty20 Qualifier	Africa	A
United Arab Emirates	Tournament host	Asia	A
Papua New Guinea	2013 ICC East Asia-Pacific Men's Championship	East Asia Pacific	B
United States	2013 ICC World Cricket League Americas Region Twenty20 Division One	Americas	A
Bermuda	2013 ICC World Cricket League Americas Region Twenty20 Division One	Americas	B
Kenya	2013 ICC World Cricket League Africa Region Twenty20 Division One	Africa	B
Uganda	2013 ICC World Cricket League Africa Region Twenty20 Division One	Africa	A
Hong Kong	2013 ACC Twenty20 Cup	Asia	A
Nepal	2013 ACC Twenty20 Cup	Asia	B
Italy	2013 ICC European T20 Championship Division One	Europe	A
Denmark	2013 ICC European T20 Championship Division One	Europe	B

== Squads ==
The following squads were named ahead of the tournament:

Afghanistan	Bermuda	Canada	Denmark	Hong Kong	Ireland	Italy	Kenya
Mohammad Nabi; Afsar Zazai; Amir Hamza; Asghar Afghan; Dawlat Zadran; Gulbadin Naib; Izatullah Dawlatzai; Karim Sadiq; Mirwais Ashraf; Mohammad Shahzad; Najibullah Zadran; Nawroz Mangal; Samiullah Shenwari; Shafiqullah; Shapoor Zadran; Hamid Hassan; Noor Ali Zadran	Janeiro Tucker; Kamal Bashir; Derrick Brangman; Christian Burgess; Lionel Cann; Allan Douglas; Chris Douglas; Terryn Fray; David Hemp; Malachi Jones; Kamau Leverock; Tre Manders; Jacobi Robinson; Dion Stovell; Kwame Tucker	Ashish Bagai; Jimmy Hansra; Harvir Baidwan; Damodar Daesrath; Abzal Dean; Jeremy Gordon; Ruvindu Gunasekera; Hamza Tariq; Junaid Siddiqui; Kenneth Kamyuka; Henry Osinde; Hiral Patel; Raza-ur-Rehman; Rizwan Cheema; Usman Limbada	Michael Pedersen; Aftab Ahmed; Bashir Shah; Christo Botma; Jakob Rubin; Kasper Rubin; Basit Raja; Kamran Mahmood; Freddie Klokker; Pawan Kumar; Carsten Pedersen; Rizwan Mahmood; Hamid Shah; Taha Ahmed; Yasir Iqbal	Jamie Atkinson; Waqas Barkat; Aizaz Khan; Ankur Vasishta; Babar Hayat; Mark Chapman; Daljeet Singh; Haseeb Amjad; Irfan Ahmed; Roy Lamsam; Munir Dar; Nadeem Ahmed; Nizakat Khan; Kinchit Shah; Tanwir Afzal; Skhawat Ali	William Porterfield; Alex Cusack; George Dockrell; Trent Johnston; Ed Joyce; Andy McBrine; John Mooney; Tim Murtagh; Kevin O'Brien; Niall O'Brien; James Shannon; Max Sorensen; Paul Stirling; Stuart Thompson; Gary Wilson	Damian Crowley; Gayashan Munasinghe; Dilan Fernando; Gareth Berg; Alessandro Bonora; Madupa Fernando; Tharindu Fernando; Dinidu Marage; Andy Northcote; Vince Pennazza; Joy Perera; Peter Petricola; Michael Raso; Sujith Rillegodage; Carl Sandri	Collins Obuya; Ragheb Aga; Duncan Allan; Dhiren Gondaria; Irfan Karim; Shem Ngoche; Alex Obanda; Nelson Odhiambo; Nehemiah Odhiambo; Thomas Odoyo; Elijah Otieno; Morris Ouma; Rakep Patel; Steve Tikolo; Hiren Varaiya
Namibia	Nepal	Netherlands	Papua New Guinea	Scotland	Uganda	United Arab Emirates	United States
Sarel Burger; Raymond van Schoor; Stephan Baard; Gerhard Erasmus; Shalako Groenewald; Louis Klazinga; JP Kotze; Bernard Scholtz; Nicolaas Scholtz; JJ Smit; Louis van der Westhuizen; Tobias Verwey; Christi Viljoen; Craig Williams; Pikky Ya France	Paras Khadka; Pradeep Airee; Binod Bhandari; Amrit Bhattarai; Mahesh Chhetri; Shakti Gauchan; Avinash Karn; Subash Khakurel; Gyanendra Malla; Anil Mandal; Jitendra Mukhiya; Basant Regmi; Sagar Pun; Sharad Vesawkar; Rahul Vishwakarma	Peter Borren; Ahsan Malik; Wesley Barresi; Mudassar Bukhari; Atse Buurman; Ben Cooper; Tim Gruijters; Vivian Kingma; Stephan Myburgh; Michael Rippon; Pieter Seelaar; Michael Swart; Eric Szwarczynski; Daan van Bunge; Paul van Meekeren	Chris Amini; Jack Vare; Charles Amini; Mahuru Dai; Willie Gavera; Andrew Hicks; Geraint Jones; Christopher Kent; Vani Morea; Kila Pala; Pipi Raho; John Reva; Tony Ura; Assad Vala; Norman Vanua	Kyle Coetzer; Craig Wallace; Richie Berrington; Neil Carter; Matthew Cross; Gordon Goudie; Majid Haq; Moneeb Iqbal; Michael Leask; Matt Machan; Calum MacLeod; David Murphy; Safyaan Sharif; Rob Taylor; Iain Wardlaw; Preston Mommsen	Davis Karashani; Hamza Almuzahim; Arthur Kyobe; Brian Masaba; Roger Mukasa; Frank Nsubuga; Patrick Ochan; Richard Okia; Raymond Otim; Phillimon Selowa; Jonathan Ssebanja; Henry Ssenyondo; Charles Waiswa; Arthur Ziraba	Khurram Khan; Abdul Shakoor; Ahmed Raza; Amjad Javed; Manjula Guruge; Kamran Shazad; Mohammad Azam; Mohammad Naveed; Mohammad Shafiq; Nasir Aziz; Swapnil Patil; Rohan Mustafa; Saqib Ali; Shaiman Anwar; Shadeep Silva; Asim Khurshid	Neil McGarrell; Timroy Allen; Orlando Baker; Barrington Bartley; Danial Ahmed; Akeem Dodson; Fahad Babar; Karan Ganesh; Elmore Hutchinson; Imran Awan; Muhammad Ghous; Japen Patel; Adam Sanford; Srini Santhanam; Steven Taylor; Steve Massiah

== Match officials ==
Officiating the tournament were three regional match referees and 17 umpires, one of whom was from the Elite Panel and three were on the ICC Associate and Affiliate Panel of Umpires.

Umpires

- (Australia) Steve Davis
- (Australia) John Ward
- (Bangladesh) Sharfuddoula
- (England) Michael Gough
- (India) Chettithody Shamshuddin
- (India) S. Ravi
- (Ireland) Mark Hawthorne
- (Nepal) Buddhi Pradhan
- (New Zealand) Chris Gaffaney
- (New Zealand) Derek Walker
- (Pakistan) Shozab Raza
- (Scotland) Ian Ramage
- (Singapore) Sarika Prasad
- (South Africa) Adrian Holdstock
- (Sri Lanka) Ranmore Martinesz
- (Cricket West Indies) Gregory Brathwaite
- (Cricket West Indies) Joel Wilson

Match referees

- (England) David Jukes
- (South Africa) Dev Govindjee
- (Sri Lanka) Graeme Labrooy

== Warm-up matches ==
Warm-up matches

12 November
10:00
Scorecard

Italy; 128/6 (20 overs)	v	Bermuda; 126/7 (20 overs)
Carl Sandri 42 (27); Jacobi Robinson 2/18 (4 overs)		Dion Stovell 33 (17); Carl Sandri 2/22 (4 overs)

Italy won by 2 runs
Sheikh Zayed Stadium Nursery 2, Abu Dhabi
Umpires: Derek Walker (NZ) and Ranmore Martinesz (SL)

- Italy won the toss and elected to bat.

12 November
10:00
Scorecard

Netherlands; 139/5 (20 overs)	v	Ireland; 143/4 (19.4 overs)
Wesley Barresi 50 (46); Alex Cusack 2/16 (4 overs)		William Porterfield 75* (58); Mudassar Bukhari 2/25 (4 overs)

Ireland won by 6 wickets
Sheikh Zayed Stadium, Abu Dhabi
Umpires: Chettithody Shamsuddin (Ind) and Ian Ramage (Sco)

- Ireland won the toss and elected to field.

12 November
10:00
Scorecard

Uganda; 114/5 (20 overs)	v	Papua New Guinea; 118/4 (18.4 overs)
Hamza Almuzahim 42* (41); Charles Amini 2/20 (4 overs)		Geraint Jones 38 (39); Roger Musaka 2/26 (4 overs)

Papua New Guinea won by 6 wickets
Sheikh Zayed Stadium Nursery 1, Abu Dhabi
Umpires: Gregory Brathwaite (WI) and Michael Gough (Eng)

- Papua New Guinea won the toss and elected to field.

12 November
10:00
Scorecard

United States; 133/6 (20 overs)	v	Scotland; 134/3 (18.5 overs)
Steven Taylor 55 (51); Iain Wardlaw 3/25 (4 overs)		Calum MacLeod 46 (43); Timroy Allen 1/10 (3 overs)

Scotland won by 7 wickets
ICC Academy, Dubai
Umpires: Sarika Prasad (Sin) and Mark Hawthorne (Ire)

- Scotland won the toss and elected to field.

12 November
10:00
Scorecard

United Arab Emirates; 138/7 (20 overs)	v	Nepal; 142/5 (19.3 overs)
Khurram Khan 55 (40); Jitendra Mukhiya 3/30 (3 overs)		Paras Khadka 85* (62); Nasir Aziz 3/44 (4 overs)

Nepal won by 5 wickets
ICC Academy Ground No 2, Dubai
Umpires: Joel Wilson (WI) and Adrian Holdstock (SA)

- Nepal won the toss and elected to field.

12 November
14:00
Scorecard

Afghanistan; 128/5 (20 overs)	v	Canada; 129/3 (19.3 overs)
Najibullah Zadran 48* (33); Raza-ur-Rehman 2/26 (4 overs)		Ashish Bagai 53* (45); Hamza Hotak 2/18 (3.3 overs)

Canada won by 7 wickets
Sheikh Zayed Stadium, Abu Dhabi
Umpires: Ian Ramage (Sco) and Chettithody Shamsuddin (Ind)

- Afghanistan won the toss and elected to bat.

12 November
14:00
Scorecard

Hong Kong; 200/4 (20 overs)	v	Denmark; 60 (14.2 overs)
Babar Hayat 69* (37); Hamid Shah 2/15 (4 overs)		Aftab Ahmed 16 (12); Aizaz Khan 3/2 (1.2 overs)

Hong Kong won by 140 runs
Sharjah Cricket Stadium, Sharjah
Umpires: Sharfuddoula (Ban) and John Ward (Aus)

- Hong Kong won the toss and elected to bat.

12 November
14:00
Scorecard

Kenya; 160/5 (20 overs)	v	Namibia; 123 (18.3 overs)
Rakep Patel 52 (27); Bernard Scholtz 3/14 (4 overs)		Sarel Burger 30 (30); Shem Ngoche 3/12 (3.3 overs)

Kenya won by 37 runs
ICC Academy Ground No 2, Dubai
Umpires: S. Ravi (Ind) and Joel Wilson (WI)

- Kenya won the toss and elected to bat.

13 November
10:00
Scorecard

Papua New Guinea; 161/8 (20 overs)	v	Ireland; 143/7 (20 overs)
Geraint Jones 39 (26); Kevin O'Brien 3/31 (4 overs)		Gary Wilson 36 (24); John Reva 3/25 (4 overs)

Papua New Guinea won by 18 runs
ICC Academy, Dubai
Umpires: Chris Gaffaney (NZ) and John Ward (Aus)

- Papua New Guinea won the toss and elected to bat.

13 November
10:00
Scorecard

Nepal; 129/7 (20 overs)	v	United States; 130/5 (19.4 overs)
Gyanendra Malla 36 (38); Muhammad Ghous 2/29 (4 overs)		Elmore Hutchinson 33 (32); Sagar Pun 2/25 (4 overs)

United States won by 5 wickets
Sheikh Zayed Stadium Nursery 2, Abu Dhabi
Umpires: Michael Gough (Eng) and Derek Walker (NZ)

- Nepal won the toss and elected to bat.

13 November
14:00
Scorecard

Uganda; 76/9 (20 overs)	v	Afghanistan; 78/4 (12.2 overs)
Raymond Otim 16* (23); Mohammad Nabi 3/6 (4 overs)		Gulbadin Naib 25* (18); Patrick Ochan 1/12 (2 overs)

Afghanistan won by 6 wickets
Sharjah Cricket Stadium, Sharjah
Umpires: Sarika Prasad (Sin) and Adrian Holdstock (SA)

- Uganda won the toss and elected to bat.

13 November
14:00
Scorecard

Canada; 182/5 (20 overs)	v	Bermuda; 186/7 (20 overs)
Hiral Patel 64 (50); Malachi Jones 2/28 (3 overs)		Dion Stovell 55 (44); Jeremy Gordon 2/20 (4 overs)

Bermuda won by 3 wickets
ICC Academy Ground No 2, Dubai
Umpires: Buddhi Pradhan (Nep) and Mark Hawthorne (Ire)

- Canada won the toss and elected to bat.

13 November
14:00
Scorecard

Hong Kong; 99 (20 overs)	v	Kenya; 103/7 (19.5 overs)
Irfan Ahmed 23* (16); Steve Tikolo 3/13 (4 overs)		Irfan Karim 37 (37); Munir Dar 3/15 (3.5 overs)

Kenya won by 3 wickets
Sheikh Zayed Stadium Nursery 2, Abu Dhabi
Umpires: Derek Walker (NZ) and Michael Gough (Eng)

- Hong Kong won the toss and elected to bat.

13 November
14:00
Scorecard

Italy; 145/7 (20 overs)	v	Netherlands; 147/4 (16.3 overs)
Damian Crowley 70 (52); Tim Gruijters 1/16 (3 overs)		Eric Szwarczynski 59* (43); Damian Crowley 2/18 (3 overs)

Netherlands won by 6 wickets
ICC Academy, Dubai
Umpires: Chris Gaffaney (NZ) and Joel Wilson (WI)

- Italy won the toss and elected to bat.

13 November
14:00
Scorecard

Namibia; 116/6 (20 overs)	v	Scotland; 119/1 (12.2 overs)
Christi Viljoen 47 (43); Neil Carter 2/23 (4 overs)		Calum MacLeod 62* (43); Nicolaas Scholtz 1/13 (2 overs)

Scotland won by 9 wickets
Sheikh Zayed Stadium, Abu Dhabi
Umpires: Chettithody Shamsuddin (Ind) and Gregory Brathwaite (WI)

- Namibia won the toss and elected to bat.

13 November
14:00
Scorecard

Denmark; 90/7 (20 overs)	v	United Arab Emirates; 91/4 (12.5 overs)
Kamran Mahmood 24 (27); Amjad Javed 3/7 (4 overs)		Mohammad Azam 30 (24); Aftab Ahmed 1/10 (3 overs)

United Arab Emirates won by 6 wickets
Sheikh Zayed Stadium Nursery 1, Abu Dhabi
Umpires: Ranmore Martinesz (SL) and Ian Ramage (Sco)

- United Arab Emirates won the toss and elected to field.

== Fixtures and results ==
=== Group A ===
==== Points table ====
Pos	Team	Pld	W	L	T	NR	Pts	NRR	Qualification
1	Ireland	7	6	0	0	1	13	2.058	Advanced to 1st place playoffs.
2	Hong Kong	7	5	2	0	0	10	0.440	Advanced to 1st place playoffs.
3	United Arab Emirates	7	5	2	0	0	10	0.269	Advanced to 1st place playoffs.
4	Namibia	7	4	3	0	0	8	0.197	Advanced to 5th place playoffs.
5	Italy	7	2	4	0	1	5	0.457	Advanced to 5th place playoffs.
6	Canada	7	2	5	0	0	4	−0.359	Advanced to consolation playoffs.
7	Uganda	7	1	5	0	1	3	−1.494	Advanced to consolation playoffs.
8	United States	7	1	5	0	1	3	−1.646	Advanced to consolation playoffs.

==== Results ====
15 November
10:00
Scorecard

Ireland; 166/5 (20 overs)	v	Namibia; 134/7 (20 overs)
Paul Stirling 52 (36); Sarel Burger 1/23 (4 overs)		Raymond van Schoor 48* (45); Alex Cusack 2/22 (4 overs)

Ireland won by 32 runs
Sheikh Zayed Stadium, Abu Dhabi
Umpires: Gregory Brathwaite (WI) and Steve Davis (Aus)
Player of the match: Paul Stirling (Ire)

- Namibia won the toss and elected to field.

15 November
10:00
Scorecard

Uganda; 88/8 (20 overs)	v	United Arab Emirates; 89/2 (14.2 overs)
Phillimon Selowa 22 (27); Nasir Aziz 2/14 (4 overs)		Shaiman Anwar 54 (38); Brian Masaba 2/15 (3 overs)

United Arab Emirates won by 8 wickets
Sheikh Zayed Stadium Nursery 1, Abu Dhabi
Umpires: Ranmore Martinesz (SL) and Ian Ramage (Sco)
Player of the match: Shaiman Anwar (UAE)

- United Arab Emirates won the toss and elected to field.

15 November
14:00
Scorecard

Canada; 137/6 (20 overs)	v	United States; 138/5 (19.5 overs)
Jimmy Hansra 39 (34); Adam Sanford 2/28 (3 overs)		Timroy Allen 50* (31); Junaid Siddiqui 2/16 (4 overs)

United States won by 5 wickets
Sheikh Zayed Stadium, Abu Dhabi
Umpires: Gregory Brathwaite (WI) and Derek Walker (NZ)
Player of the match: Timroy Allen (USA)

- United States won the toss and elected to field.

15 November
14:00
Scorecard

Italy; 110/8 (20 overs)	v	Hong Kong; 111/3 (18.4 overs)
Carl Sandri 41 (41); Haseeb Amjad 5/12 (4 overs)		Waqas Barkat 51* (60); Carl Sandri 1/14 (4 overs)

Hong Kong won by 7 wickets
Sheikh Zayed Stadium Nursery 1, Abu Dhabi
Umpires: Michael Gough (Eng) and Chettithody Shamsuddin (Ind)
Player of the match: Haseeb Amjad (HK)

- Hong Kong won the toss and elected to field.

16 November
10:00
Scorecard

Namibia; 120/9 (20 overs)	v	United Arab Emirates; 121/5 (19 overs)
Christi Viljoen 35 (30); Rohan Mustafa 3/14 (4 overs)		Mohammad Azam 51 (56); Bernard Scholtz 2/25 (4 overs)

United Arab Emirates won by 5 wickets
Sheikh Zayed Stadium, Abu Dhabi
Umpires: Ian Ramage (Sco) and Chettithody Shamsuddin (Ind)
Player of the match: Rohan Mustafa (UAE)

- United Arab Emirates won the toss and elected to field.

16 November
14:00
Scorecard

Ireland; 168/5 (20 overs)	v	Canada; 166/3 (20 overs)
Trent Johnston 39* (24); Jimmy Hansra 2/24 (3 overs)		Ashish Bagai 67* (55); Max Sorensen 2/23 (3 overs)

Ireland won by 2 runs
Sheikh Zayed Stadium, Abu Dhabi
Umpires: Michael Gough (Eng) and Ranmore Martinesz (SL)
Player of the match: Ashish Bagai (Can)

- Canada won the toss and elected to field.
- T20I debuts: Damodar Daesrath and Jeremy Gordon (Canada)

16 November
14:00
Scorecard

Uganda; 105 (20 overs)	v	Hong Kong; 105/6 (18.1 overs)
Richard Okia 31 (29); Tanwir Afzal 3/12 (4 overs)		Irfan Ahmed 27 (29); Roger Mukasa 4/23 (4 overs)

Hong Kong won by 4 wickets
Sheikh Zayed Stadium Nursery 1, Abu Dhabi
Umpires: Steve Davis (Aus) and Ahsan Raza (Pak)
Player of the match: Haseeb Amjad (HK)

- Uganda won the toss and elected to bat.

16 November
14:00
Scorecard

United States; 160/5 (20 overs)	v	Italy; 163/4 (19.2 overs)
Steven Taylor 91 (56); Shan Munasinghe 2/26 (4 overs)		Gareth Berg 90 (47); Karan Ganesh 2/32 (4 overs)

Italy won by 6 wickets
Sheikh Zayed Stadium Nursery 2, Abu Dhabi
Umpires: Gregory Brathwaite (WI) and Derek Walker (NZ)
Player of the match: Gareth Berg (Italy)

- United States won the toss and elected to bat.

17 November
14:00
Scorecard

Namibia; 163/4 (20 overs)	v	United States; 128/8 (20 overs)
Sarel Burger 43 (36); Karan Ganesh 2/14 (4 overs)		Steven Taylor 44 (34); Bernard Scholtz 2/18 (4 overs)

Namibia won by 35 runs
Sheikh Zayed Stadium Nursery 1, Abu Dhabi
Umpires: Ahsan Raza (Pak) and Gregory Brathwaite (WI)
Player of the match: Sarel Burger (Nam)

- United States won the toss and elected to field.

17 November
14:00
Scorecard

Ireland; 138/5 (20 overs)	v	United Arab Emirates; 133 (19.5 overs)
Gary Wilson 53* (44); Shadeep Silva 2/23 (4 overs)		Khurram Khan 35 (28); Max Sorensen 2/17 (4 overs)

Ireland won by 5 runs
Sheikh Zayed Stadium Nursery 2, Abu Dhabi
Umpires: Chettithody Shamshuddin (Ind) and Derek Walker (NZ)
Player of the match: Kevin O'Brien (Ire)

- Ireland won the toss and elected to bat.

18 November
10:00
Scorecard

Italy; 148/4 (20 overs)	v	Uganda; 151/9 (19.5 overs)
Gareth Berg 62 (34); Frank Nsubuga 2/22 (4 overs)		Arthur Kyobe 36 (15); Vincenzo Pennazza 2/20 (4 overs)

Uganda won by 1 wicket
Sheikh Zayed Stadium, Abu Dhabi
Umpires: Steve Davis (Aus) and Ian Ramage (Sco)
Player of the match: Richard Okia (Uga)

- Uganda won the toss and elected to field.

18 November
14:00
Scorecard

Hong Kong; 168/5 (20 overs)	v	Canada; 115/8 (20 oovers)
Irfan Ahmed 100 (53); Hiral Patel 2/33 (3 overs)		Jimmy Hansra 26 (21); Munir Dar 4/17 (4 overs)

Hong Kong won by 53 runs
Sheikh Zayed Stadium Nursery 1, Abu Dhabi
Umpires: Gregory Brathwaite (WI) and Ranmore Martinesz (SL)
Player of the match: Irfan Ahmed (HK)

- Canada won the toss and elected to field.

19 November
10:00
Scorecard

Italy; 121/6 (20 overs)	v	Namibia; 122/7 (20 overs)
Michael Raso 35* (27); JJ Smit 2/23 (4 overs)		Craig Williams 57 (51); Sandri, Munasinghe 2/23 (4 overs)

Namibia won by 3 wickets
Sheikh Zayed Stadium Nursery 1, Abu Dhabi
Umpires: Steve Davis (Aus) and Chettithody Shamsuddin (Ind)
Player of the match: Craig Williams (Nam)

- Italy won the toss and elected to bat.

19 November
14:00
Scorecard

Hong Kong; 138/8 (20 overs)	v	United Arab Emirates; 142/3 (18.4 overs)
James Atkinson 42 (34); Manjula Guruge 3/19 (4 overs)		Khurram Khan 67* (42); Tanwir Afzal 2/16 (4 overs)

United Arab Emirates won by 7 wickets
Sheikh Zayed Stadium, Abu Dhabi
Umpires: Ranmore Martinesz (SL) and Derek Walker (NZ)
Player of the match: Khurram Khan (UAE)

- United Arab Emirates won the toss and elected to field.

19 November
14:00
Scorecard

Canada; 137/7 (20 overs)	v	Uganda; 93 (17.2 overs)
Jimmy Hansra 58* (41); Davis Arinaitwe 2/25 (4 overs)		Davis Arinaitwe 28 (30); Jeremy Gordon 2/9 (3 overs)

Canada won by 44 runs
Sheikh Zayed Stadium Nursery 1, Abu Dhabi
Umpires: Ahsan Raza (Pak) and Michael Gough (Eng)
Player of the match: Jimmy Hansra (Can)

- Canada won the toss and elected to bat.

20 November
10:00
Scorecard

Ireland; 216/3 (20 overs)	v	United States; 141 (19.3 overs)
William Porterfield 127* (69); Danial Ahmed 2/30 (4 overs)		Akeem Dodson 27 (25); Paul Stirling 3/25 (4 overs)

Ireland won by 75 runs
Sheikh Zayed Stadium, Abu Dhabi
Umpires: Michael Gough (Eng) and Ian Ramage (Sco)
Player of the match: William Porterfield (Ire)

- United States won the toss and elected to field.

20 November
14:00
Scorecard

Namibia; 111/9 (20 overs)	v	Hong Kong; 114/2 (18.2 overs)
Louis van der Westhuizen 22 (22); Nadeem Ahmed 3/18 (4 overs)		James Atkinson 50 (43); Louis van der Westhuizen 1/14 (4 overs)

Hong Kong won by 8 wickets
Sheikh Zayed Stadium Nursery 2, Abu Dhabi
Umpires: Chettithody Shamsuddin (Ind) and Derek Walker (NZ)
Player of the match: James Atkinson (HK)

- Namibia won the toss and elected to bat.

21 November
10:00
Scorecard

Ireland	v	Italy

Match abandoned without a ball bowled
Sheikh Zayed Stadium Nursery 1, Abu Dhabi
Umpires: Gregory Brathwaite (WI) and Ranmore Martinesz (SL)

- Match abandoned due to rain.

21 November
14:00
Scorecard

Uganda	v	United States

Match abandoned without a ball bowled
Sheikh Zayed Stadium Nursery 2, Abu Dhabi
Umpires: Steve Davis (Aus) and Michael Gough (Eng)

- Match abandoned due to rain.

22 November
10:00
Scorecard

United Arab Emirates; 159/8 (20 overs)	v	Canada; 123 (19.5 overs)
Mohammad Azam 36 (27); Harvir Baidwan 4/23 (4 overs)		Ashish Bagai 43 (41); Nasir Aziz 3/25 (4 overs)

United Arab Emirates won by 36 runs
Sheikh Zayed Stadium, Abu Dhabi
Umpires: Steve Davis (Aus) and Shozab Raza (Pak)
Player of the match: Harvir Baidwan (Can)

- Canada won the toss and elected to field.

22 November
14:00
Scorecard

Ireland; 147/4 (20 overs)	v	Uganda; 99/7 (20 overs)
Gary Wilson 40 (27); Frank Nsubuga 1/17 (4 overs)		Hamza Almuzahim 21 (29); George Dockrell 2/12 (4 overs)

Ireland won by 48 runs
Sheikh Zayed Stadium, Abu Dhabi
Umpires: Ranmore Martinesz (SL) and Derek Walker (NZ)
Player of the match: Gary Wilson (Ire)

- Ireland won the toss and elected to bat.

22 November
14:00
Scorecard

Hong Kong; 169/4 (20 overs)	v	United States; 102 (19.1 overs)
James Atkinson 74 (52); Barrington Bartley 2/48 (3 overs)		Karan Ganesh 29 (23); Munir Dar 4/17 (3.1 overs)

Hong Kong won by 67 runs
Sheikh Zayed Stadium Nursery 2, Abu Dhabi
Umpires: Ian Ramage (Sco) and Chettithody Shamsuddin (Ind)
Player of the match: Munir Dar (HK)

- United States won the toss and elected to field.

23 November
10:00
Scorecard

Canada; 117 (20 overs)	v	Namibia; 120/3 (19.3 overs)
Ruvindu Gunasekera 25 (25); Nicolaas Scholtz 5/13 (3 overs)		Raymond van Schoor 58 (55); Jeremy Gordon 1/22 (4 overs)

Namibia won by 7 wickets
Sheikh Zayed Stadium Nursery 1, Abu Dhabi
Umpires: Gregory Brathwaite (WI) and Ian Ramage (Sco)
Player of the match: Nicolaas Scholtz (Nam)

- Namibia won the toss and elected to field.

23 November
14:00
Scorecard

Italy; 158/5 (20 overs)	v	United Arab Emirates; 91 (16.2 overs)
Damian Crowley 59 (48); Amjad Javed 1/6 (1 over)		Mohammad Shafiq 25 (26); Gayashan Munasinghe 3/19 (3 overs)

Italy won by 67 runs
Sheikh Zayed Stadium Nursery 2, Abu Dhabi
Umpires: Michael Gough (Eng) and Shozab Raza (Pak)
Player of the match: Damian Crowley (Ita)

- United Arab Emirates won the toss and elected to field.

24 November
10:00
Scorecard

Italy; 104/6 (20 overs)	v	Canada; 105/5 (19.2 overs)
Damian Crowley 61* (59); Jeremy Gordon 3/15 (4 overs)		Rizwan Cheema 34 (47); Gayashan Munasinghe 3/18 (3.2 overs)

Canada won by 5 wickets
Sheikh Zayed Stadium, Abu Dhabi
Umpires: Steve Davis (Aus) and Chettithody Shamsuddin (Ind)
Player of the match: Jeremy Gordon (Can)

- Italy won the toss and elected to bat.

24 November
10:00
Scorecard

Namibia; 125/7 (20 overs)	v	Uganda; 87/9 (20 overs)
Nicolaas Scholtz 38 (26); Charles Waiswa 2/26 (4 overs)		Phillimon Selowa 35 (37); Louis van der Westhuizen 3/12 (4 overs)

Namibia won by 38 runs
Sheikh Zayed Stadium Nursery 1, Abu Dhabi
Umpires: Ranmore Martinesz (SL) and Shozab Raza (Pak)
Player of the match: Nicolaas Scholtz (Nam)

- Namibia won the toss and elected to bat.

24 November
14:00
Scorecard

Ireland; 207/4 (20 overs)	v	Hong Kong; 122 (17.1 overs)
Paul Stirling 77 (46); Nizakat Khan 2/26 (4 overs)		Jamie Atkinson 48 (38); Paul Stirling 4/10 (4 overs)

Ireland won by 85 runs
Sheikh Zayed Stadium, Abu Dhabi
Umpires: Gregory Brathwaite (WI) and Derek Walker (NZ)
Player of the match: Paul Stirling (Ire)

- Ireland won the toss and elected to bat.

24 November
14:00
Scorecard

United Arab Emirates; 151/5 (20 overs)	v	United States; 137/7 (20 overs)
Khurram Khan 61* (42); Karan Ganesh 2/21 (4 overs)		Steven Taylor 42 (46); Khurram Khan 3/30 (4 overs)

United Arab Emirates won by 14 runs
Sheikh Zayed Stadium Nursery 1, Abu Dhabi
Umpires: Michael Gough (Eng) and Ian Ramage (Sco)
Player of the match: Khurram Khan (UAE)

- United Arab Emirates won the toss and elected to bat.

=== Group B ===
==== Points table ====
Pos	Team	Pld	W	L	T	NR	Pts	NRR	Qualification
1	Afghanistan	7	6	1	0	0	12	1.207	Advanced to 1st place playoffs.
2	Netherlands	7	5	2	0	0	10	1.087	Advanced to 1st place playoffs.
3	Nepal	7	4	3	0	0	8	0.379	Advanced to 1st place playoffs.
4	Scotland	7	4	3	0	0	8	0.379	Advanced to 5th place playoffs.
5	Papua New Guinea	7	3	3	0	1	7	−0.053	Advanced to 5th place playoffs.
6	Kenya	7	3	4	0	0	6	1.071	Advanced to consolation playoffs.
7	Bermuda	7	2	5	0	0	4	−1.255	Advanced to consolation playoffs.
8	Denmark	7	0	6	0	1	1	−3.216	Advanced to consolation playoffs.

==== Results ====
15 November
10:00
Scorecard

Denmark; 79 (19.4 overs)	v	Nepal; 80/5 (13.1 overs)
Hamid Shah 18 (24); Sagar Pun 3/12 (3 overs)		Paras Khadka 48 (34); Kamran Mahmood 2/4 (1.1 overs)

Nepal won by 5 wickets
ICC Academy Ground No 2, Dubai
Umpires: Chris Gaffaney (NZ) and Sarika Prasad (Sin)
Player of the match: Paras Khadka (Nep)

- Denmark won the toss and elected to bat.

15 November
10:00
Scorecard

Bermuda; 149/7 (20 overs)	v	Scotland; 131 (19.5 overs)
Dion Stovell 29 (20); Gordon Goudie 2/16 (3 overs)		Kyle Coetzer 37 (39); Jacobi Robinson 3/8 (2 overs)

Bermuda won by 18 runs
Sharjah Cricket Stadium, Sharjah
Umpires: Buddhi Pradhan (Nep) and John Ward (Aus)
Player of the match: Dion Stovell (Ber)

- Bermuda won the toss and elected to bat.

15 November
14:00
Scorecard

Afghanistan; 90 (19.1 overs)	v	Netherlands; 92/3 (12.5 overs)
Mohammad Shahzad 20 (25); Mudassar Bukhari 2/7 (3.1 overs)		Peter Borren 38* (15); Mohammad Nabi 2/18 (2 overs)

Netherlands won by 7 wickets
Sharjah Cricket Stadium, Sharjah
Umpires: Mark Hawthorne (Ire) and S. Ravi (Ind)
Player of the match: Peter Borren (Ned)

- Afghanistan won the toss and elected to bat.
- T20I debut: Ben Cooper (Netherlands)

15 November
14:00
Scorecard

Kenya; 176/5 (20 overs)	v	Papua New Guinea; 177/6 (17.4 overs)
Collins Obuya 53* (40); Chris Amini 2/31 (4 overs)		Kila Pala 46 (30); Elijah Otieno 2/19 (2.4 overs)

Papua New Guinea won by 4 wickets
ICC Academy Ground No 2, Dubai
Umpires: Adrian Holdstock (SA) and Joel Wilson (WI)
Player of the match: Geraint Jones (PNG)

- Kenya won the toss and elected to bat.

16 November
10:00
Scorecard

Denmark; 111/8 (20 overs)	v	Bermuda; 112/1 (16.2 overs)
Hamid Shah 31 (30); Derrick Brangman 3/29 (4 overs)		Tre Manders 45* (48); Bashir Shah 0/5 (2 overs)

Bermuda won by 9 wickets
ICC Academy, Dubai
Umpires: Sarika Prasad (Sin) and S. Ravi (Ind)
Player of the match: Tre Manders (Ber)

- Denmark won the toss and elected to bat.

16 November
14:00
Scorecard

Afghanistan; 171/6 (20 overs)	v	Scotland; 154/6 (20 overs)
Mohammad Nabi 46 (29); Iain Wardlaw 3/40 (4 overs)		Calum MacLeod 56 (47); Shapoor Zadran 2/30 (4 overs)

Afghanistan won by 17 runs
Sharjah Cricket Stadium, Sharjah
Umpires: Chris Gaffaney (NZ) and Adrian Holdstock (SA)
Player of the match: Dawlat Zadran (Afg)

- Afghanistan won the toss and elected to bat.
- T20I debut: Rob Taylor (Scotland)

16 November
14:00
Scorecard

Papua New Guinea; 193/3 (20 overs)	v	Netherlands; 141/9 (20 overs)
Tony Ura 100 (60); Bukhari, Borren 1/29 (4 overs)		Michael Rippon 50* (40); Norman Vanua 3/12 (3 overs)

Papua New Guinea won by 52 runs
ICC Academy, Dubai
Umpires: Joel Wilson (WI) and Buddhi Pradhan (Nep)
Player of the match: Tony Ura (PNG)

- Netherlands won the toss and elected to field.

16 November
14:00
Scorecard

Kenya; 182/7 (20 overs)	v	Nepal; 186/4 (19.4 overs)
Rakep Patel 103 (45); Jitendra Mukhiya 2/31 (4 overs)		Paras Khadka 54* (31); Hiren Varaiya 1/26 (3 overs)

Nepal won by 6 wickets
ICC Academy Ground No 2, Dubai
Umpires: John Ward (Aus) and Mark Hawthorne (Ire)
Player of the match: Rakep Patel (Ken)

- Nepal won the toss and elected to field.

17 November
14:00
Scorecard

Bermuda; 144/8 (20 overs)	v	Netherlands; 145/2 (16 overs)
Janeiro Tucker 51* (25); Ahsan Malik 2/15 (4 overs)		Stephan Myburgh 78* (53); Jacobi Robinson 2/27 (4 overs)

Netherland won by 8 wickets
ICC Academy, Dubai
Umpires: Adrian Holdstock (SA) and John Ward (Aus)
Player of the match: Stephan Myburgh (Ned)

- Bermuda won the toss and elected to bat.

17 November
14:00
Scorecard

Papua New Guinea; 167/6 (20 overs)	v	Afghanistan; 72/4 (7 overs)
Tony Ura 56 (49); Samiullah Shenwari 3/23 (4 overs)		Mohammad Nabi 36* (22); Norman Vanua 1/5 (1 over)

Afghanistan won by 6 wickets (D/L)
Sharjah Cricket Stadium, Sharjah
Umpires: Mark Hawthorne (Ire) and Sarika Prasad (Sin)
Player of the match: Samiullah Shenwari (Afg)

- Papua New Guinea won the toss and elected to bat.
- Afghanistan's target was revised to 69 runs from 7 overs according to the Duckworth–Lewis method.

18 November
10:00
Scorecard

Denmark; 84/8 (20 overs)	v	Kenya; 85/2 (9.1 overs)
Michael Pedersen 21 (38); Nehemiah Odhiambo 3/15 (4 overs)		Steve Tikolo 48* (30); Kamran Mahmood 1/5 (1.1 overs)

Kenya won by 8 wickets
ICC Academy, Dubai
Umpires: Chris Gaffaney (NZ) and Buddhi Pradhan (Nep)
Player of the match: Nehemiah Odhiambo (Ken)

- Denmark won the toss and elected to bat.

18 November
14:00
Scorecard

Nepal; 137/7 (20 overs)	v	Scotland; 138/2 (19.2 overs)
Binod Bhandari 28 (25); Safyaan Sharif 3/19 (4 overs)		Calum MacLeod 82* (63); Paras Khadka 1/23 (4 overs)

Scotland won by 8 wickets
ICC Academy Ground No 2, Dubai
Umpires: S. Ravi (Ind) and Joel Wilson (WI)
Player of the match: Calum MacLeod

- Scotland won the toss and elected to field.

19 November
10:00
Scorecard

Denmark; 109/8 (20 overs)	v	Netherlands; 110/3 (10.4 overs)
Kamran Mahmood 41 (31); Ahsan Malik 4/10 (4 overs)		Stephan Myburgh 54* (32); Michael Pedersen 1/18 (2 overs)

Netherlands won by 7 wickets
ICC Academy Ground No 2, Dubai
Umpires: John Ward (Aus) and Joel Wilson (WI)
Player of the match: Ahsan Malik (Ned)

- Denmark won the toss and elected to bat.

19 November
14:00
Scorecard

Kenya; 183/7 (20 overs)	v	Scotland; 91 (13.2 overs)
Ragheb Aga 52* (25); Majid Haq 2/21 (4 overs)		David Murphy 20 (21); Steve Tikolo 4/2 (1.2 overs)

Kenya won by 92 runs
ICC Academy, Dubai
Umpires: Adrian Holdstock (SA) and S. Ravi (Ind)
Player of the match: Ragheb Aga (Ken)

- Kenya won the toss and elected to bat.

19 November
14:00
Scorecard

Papua New Guinea; 140/6 (20 overs)	v	Nepal; 141/3 (18.2 overs)
Geraint Jones 55 (53); Paras Khadka 3/22 (4 overs)		Binod Bhandari 51* (23); Chris Amini 1/30 (3.2 overs)

Nepal won by 7 wickets
Sharjah Cricket Stadium, Sharjah
Umpires: Chris Gaffaney (NZ) and Sarika Prasad (Sin)
Player of the match: Binod Bhandari (Nep)

- Papua New Guinea won the toss and elected to bat.

20 November
10:00
Scorecard

Bermuda; 101 (18.1 overs)	v	Afghanistan; 104/2 (9.5 overs)
Lionel Cann 28 (23); Samiullah Shenwari 3/20 (4 overs)		Mohammad Shahzad 60* (36); Janeiro Tucker 1/16 (1.5 overs)

Afghanistan won by 8 wickets
ICC Academy, Dubai
Umpires: Mark Hawthorne (Ire) and Sharfuddoula (Ban)
Player of the match: Mohammad Shahzad (Afg)

- Afghanistan won the toss and elected to field.

20 November
14:00
Scorecard

Nepal; 107/6 (20 overs)	v	Netherlands; 110/5 (16.2 overs)
Gyanendra Malla 44 (55); Mudassar Bukhari 3/15 (4 overs)		Stephan Myburgh 31 (20); Basanta Regmi 3/12 (4 overs)

Netherlands won by 5 wickets
Sharjah Cricket Stadium, Sharjah
Umpires: Adrian Holdstock (SA) and Sarika Prasad (Sin)
Player of the match: Mudassar Bukhari (Ned)

- Netherlands won the toss and elected to field.

21 November
10:00
Scorecard

Scotland; 181/5 (20 overs)	v	Papua New Guinea; 97/9 (20 overs)
Calum MacLeod 58 (40); Willie Gavera 2/24 (4 overs)		Jack Vare 22 (17); Gordon Goudie 3/15 (3 overs)

Scotland won by 84 runs
ICC Academy, Dubai
Umpires: S. Ravi (Ind) and Joel Wilson (WI)
Player of the match: Rob Taylor (Scotland)

- Papua New Guinea won the toss and elected to field.

21 November
10:00
Scorecard

Denmark; 145/3 (20 overs)	v	Afghanistan; 146/8 (15.3 overs)
Carsten Pedersen 36 (35); Samiullah Shenwari 1/19 (4 overs)		Najibullah Zadran 61 (34); Bashir Shah 3/34 (4 overs)

Afghanistan won by 2 wickets
ICC Academy Ground No 2, Dubai
Umpires: Buddhi Pradhan (Nep) and John Ward (Aus)
Player of the match: Najibullah Zadran (Afg)

- Afghanistan won the toss and elected to field.

21 November
14:00
Scorecard

Bermuda; 124/7 (18 overs)	v	Kenya; 125/3 (11.2 overs)
David Hemp 30* (33); Shem Ngoche 2/6 (4 overs)		Steve Tikolo 54* (36); Jacobi Robinson 1/13 (2 overs)

Kenya won by 7 wickets
ICC Academy Ground No 2, Dubai
Umpires: Adrian Holdstock (SA) and Sharfuddoula (Ban)
Player of the match: Steve Tikolo (Kenya)

- Kenya won the toss and elected to field
- Rain reduced the match to 18 overs per side.

22 November
10:00
Scorecard

Scotland; 165/4 (20 overs)	v	Netherlands; 150/6 (20 overs)
Matt Machan 67* (46); Michael Swart 1/19 (4 overs)		Wesley Barresi 70* (49); Majid Haq 3/20 (4 overs)

Scotland won by 15 runs
ICC Academy, Dubai
Umpires: Mark Hawthorne (Ire) and S. Ravi (Ind)
Player of the match: Rob Taylor (Sco)

- Netherlands won the toss and elected to field.

22 November
10:00
Scorecard

Denmark	v	Papua New Guinea

Match abandoned without a ball bowled
Sharjah Cricket Stadium, Sharjah
Umpires: Buddhi Pradhan (Nep) and Sharfuddoula (Ban)

- Match abandoned due to rain.

22 November
14:00
Scorecard

Nepal; 73/3 (7 overs)	v	Afghanistan; 78/1 (6.2 overs)
Gyanendra Malla 23* (9); Mirwais Ashraf 2/13 (2 overs)		Mohammad Shahzad 43* (22); Paras Khadka 1/9 (1 over)

Afghanistan won by 9 wickets
Sharjah Cricket Stadium, Sharjah
Umpires: John Ward (Aus) and Joel Wilson (WI)
Player of the match: Mohammad Shahzad (Afg)

- Afghanistan won the toss and elected to field.
- Rain reduced the match to 7 overs per side.

23 November
10:00
Scorecard

Netherlands; 130/7 (20 overs)	v	Kenya; 101/9 (20 overs)
Michael Swart 44 (37); Thomas Odoyo 3/17 (4 overs)		Shem Ngoche 38 (28); Mudassar Bukhari 3/14 (4 overs)

Netherlands won by 29 runs
ICC Academy, Dubai
Umpires: Adrian Holdstock (SA) and Sarika Prasad (Sin)
Player of the match: Mudassar Bukhari (Ned)

- Netherlands won the toss and elected to bat.

23 November
14:00
Scorecard

Nepal; 148/8 (20 overs)	v	Bermuda; 127 (19.2 overs)
Gyanendra Malla 39 (22); Kamal Bashir 2/16 (2 overs)		Janeiro Tucker 48 (31); Jitendra Mukhiya 3/25 (3.2 overs)

Nepal won by 21 runs
ICC Academy, Dubai
Umpires: Adrian Holdstock (SA) and S. Ravi (Ind)
Player of the match: Jitendra Mukhiya (Nep)

- Bermuda won the toss and elected to field.

24 November
10:00
Scorecard

Scotland; 205/3 (20 overs)	v	Denmark; 130/6 (20 overs)
Matt Machan 90* (55); Bashir Shah 1/28 (4 overs)		Carsten Pedersen 43 (48); Neil Carter 1/9 (4 overs)

Scotland won by 75 runs
ICC Academy Ground No 2, Dubai
Umpires: Adrian Holdstock (SA) and S. Ravi (Ind)
Player of the match: Matt Machan (Sco)

- Scotland won the toss and elected to bat.

24 November
14:00
Scorecard

Afghanistan; 148/9 (20 overs)	v	Kenya; 114 (18.2 overs)
Noor Ali Zadran 50 (48); Duncan Allan 2/8 (2 overs)		Rakep Patel 52 (38); Samiullah Shenwari 5/13 (4 overs)

Afghanistan won by 34 runs
Sharjah Cricket Stadium, Sharjah
Umpires: Buddhi Pradhan (Nep) and Sarika Prasad (Sin)
Player of the match: Samiullah Shenwari (Afg)

- Afghanistan won the toss and elected to bat.

24 November
14:00
Scorecard

Papua New Guinea; 168/5 (20 overs)	v	Bermuda; 143/9 (20 overs)
Mahuru Dai 64* (42); Malachi Jones 2/28 (4 overs)		David Hemp 64 (49); Willie Gavera 3/17 (4 overs)

Papua New Guinea won by 25 runs
ICC Academy Ground No 2, Dubai
Umpires: Mark Hawthorne (Ire) and Joel Wilson (WI)
Player of the match: Mahuru Dai (PNG)

- Papua New Guinea won the toss and elected to bat.

=== Consolation playoffs ===
==== Results ====
15th place play-off
26 November
10:00
Scorecard

United States; 145/7 (20 overs)	v	Denmark; 124/9 (20 overs)
Akeem Dodson 41 (26); Hamid Shah 3/20 (4 overs)		Carsten Pedersen 42* (50); Danial Ahmed 5/18 (4 overs)

United States won by 21 runs
Sharjah Cricket Stadium, Sharjah
Umpires: Mark Hawthorne (Ire) and Derek Walker (NZ)
Player of the match: Danial Ahmed (USA)

- Denmark won the toss and elected to field

13th place play-off
26 November
10:00
Scorecard

Uganda; 134/7 (20 overs)	v	Bermuda; 123/4 (20 overs)
Hamza Almuzahim 45 (45); Kamau Leverock 2/24 (4 overs)		David Hemp 53 (55); Brian Masaba 2/34 (3 overs)

Uganda won by 11 runs
ICC Academy Ground No 2, Dubai
Umpires: Sharfuddoula (Ban) and Shozab Raza (Pak)
Player of the match: Hamza Almuzahim (Uga)

- Uganda won the toss and elected to bat

11th place play-off
26 November
14:00
Scorecard

Kenya; 146/7 (20 overs)	v	Canada; 125 (19.2 overs)
Steve Tikolo 40 (23); Raza Rehman 2/16 (4 overs)		Ashish Bagai 48 (46); Steve Tikolo 3/14 (4 overs)

Kenya won by 21 runs
Sharjah Cricket Stadium, Sharjah
Umpires: Sarika Prasad (Sin) and Derek Walker (NZ)
Player of the match: Steve Tikolo (Ken)

- Kenya won the toss and elected to bat.

=== 5th place playoffs ===
==== Bracket ====
Quarter-finals
A4	Namibia	120
B5	Papua New Guinea	145/4
B4	Scotland	126/3
A5	Italy	125/8

Semi-finals
A2	Hong Kong*	137/9
B5	Papua New Guinea	108
B2	Netherlands*	149/2
B4	Scotland	147/6

5th place play-off^{†}
A2	Hong Kong	121/7
B2	Netherlands	124/3
7th place play-off
B5	Papua New Guinea	143/5
B4	Scotland	146/5

- * Team entered by being eliminated in the 1st place playoffs quarter-finals.
- ^{†} Teams qualified for the 2014 ICC World Twenty20 upon reaching this stage.

==== Results ====
Quarter-finals

27 November
10:00
Scorecard

Papua New Guinea; 145/4 (20 overs)	v	Namibia; 120 (18.1 overs)
Geraint Jones 36 (33); Bernard Scholtz 2/22 (4 overs)		Craig Williams 42 (37); Pipi Raho 3/10 (3 overs)

Papua New Guinea won by 25 runs
Sheikh Zayed Stadium Nursery 1, Abu Dhabi
Umpires: Ian Ramage (Sco) and S. Ravi (Ind)
Player of the match: Pipi Raho (PNG)

- Namibia won the toss and elected to field.

27 November
10:00
Scorecard

Italy; 125/8 (20 overs)	v	Scotland; 126/3 (17.3 overs)
Andy Northcote 46* (54); Safyaan Sharif 2/19 (3 overs)		Calum MacLeod 56 (45); Carl Sandri 2/30 (4 overs)

Scotland won by 7 wickets
Sheikh Zayed Stadium Nursery 2, Abu Dhabi
Umpires: Adrian Holdstock (SA) and John Ward (Aus)
Player of the match: Calum MacLeod (Sco)

- Italy won the toss and elected to bat.

Semi-finals

28 November
10:00
Scorecard

Hong Kong; 137/9 (20 overs)	v	Papua New Guinea; 108 (19.1 overs)
Babar Hayat 48 (47); Pipi Raho 3/22 (4 overs)		Charles Amini 30 (24); Munir Dar 3/26 (3.1 overs)

Hong Kong won by 29 runs
Sheikh Zayed Stadium, Abu Dhabi
Umpires: Michael Gough (Eng) and S. Ravi (Ind)
Player of the match: Babar Hayat (HK)

- Hong Kong won the toss and elected to bat.

28 November
14:00
Scorecard

Scotland; 147/6 (20 overs)	v	Netherlands; 149/2 (17.5 overs)
Matt Machan 61 (53); Ahsan Malik 2/24 (4 overs)		Wesley Barresi 75* (47); Neil Carter 1/19 (3 overs)

Netherlands won by 8 wickets
Sheikh Zayed Stadium, Abu Dhabi
Umpires: Steve Davis (Aus) and Ranmore Martinesz (SL)
Player of the match: Wesley Barresi (Ned)

- Scotland won the toss and elected to bat.

Final

9th place play-off
28 November
10:00
Scorecard

Italy; 130/9 (20 overs)	v	Namibia; 105 (19.4 overs)
Carl Sandri 34 (35); Bernard Scholtz 2/14 (4 overs)		Gerhard Erasmus 28* (33); Gareth Berg 3/12 (3.4 overs)

Italy won by 25 runs
Sheikh Zayed Stadium Nursery 2, Abu Dhabi
Umpires: Gregory Brathwaite (WI) and Chettithody Shamsuddin (Ind)
Player of the match: Carl Sandri (Ita)

- Italy won the toss and elected to bat.

7th place play-off
29 November
10:00
Scorecard

Papua New Guinea; 143/5 (20 overs)	v	Scotland; 146/5 (20 overs)
Jack Vare 35* (24); Majid Haq 3/25 (4 overs)		Richie Berrington 70* (55); Norman Vanua 2/25 (4 overs)

Scotland won by 5 wickets
Sheikh Zayed Stadium Nursery 1, Abu Dhabi
Umpires: Gregory Brathwaite (WI) and John Ward (Aus)
Player of the match: Richie Berrington (Sco)

- Papua New Guinea won the toss and elected to bat.

5th place play-off
29 November
14:00
Scorecard

Hong Kong; 121/7 (20 overs)	v	Netherlands; 124/3 (18.4 overs)
Babar Hayat 46 (36); Vivian Kingma 3/22 (4 overs)		Ben Cooper 42 (22); Nizakat Khan 3/10 (3 overs)

Netherlands won by 7 wickets
Sheikh Zayed Stadium Nursery 1, Abu Dhabi
Umpires: Adrian Holdstock (SA) and Ian Ramage (Sco)
Player of the match: Ben Cooper

- Hong Kong won the toss and elected to bat.

=== 1st place playoffs ===
==== Bracket ====
Quarter-finals
A2	Hong Kong	143/8
B3	Nepal	144/5
B2	Netherlands	107/9
A3	United Arab Emirates	117/8

Semi-finals^{†}
B1	Afghanistan	96/3
B3	Nepal	90/8
A1	Ireland	147/8
A3	United Arab Emirates	85

Final
B1	Afghanistan	157
A1	Ireland	225/7
3rd place play-off
B3	Nepal	133/5
A3	United Arab Emirates	131/5

^{†} Teams qualified for the 2014 ICC World Twenty20 upon reaching this stage.

==== Results ====
Quarter-finals

27 November
10:00
Scorecard

Hong Kong; 143/8 (20 overs)	v	Nepal; 144/5 (20 overs)
Tanwir Afzal 25 (14); Jitendra Mukhiya 3/32 (4 overs)		Paras Khadka 46 (39); Aizaz Khan 1/14 (2 overs)

Nepal won by 5 wickets
Sheikh Zayed Stadium, Abu Dhabi
Umpires: Steve Davis (Aus) and Joel Wilson (WI)
Player of the match: Paras Khadka (Nep)

- Nepal won the toss and elected to field.

27 November
14:00
Scorecard

United Arab Emirates; 117/8 (20 overs)	v	Netherlands; 107/9 (20 overs)
Khurram Khan 32 (24); Ahsan Malik 4/17 (4 overs)		Eric Szwarczynski 23 (22); Nasir Aziz 3/21 (4 overs)

United Arab Emirates won by 10 runs
Sheikh Zayed Stadium, Abu Dhabi
Umpires: Michael Gough (Eng) and Ranmore Martinesz (SL)
Player of the match: Shadeep Silva (UAE)

- United Arab Emirates won the toss and elected to bat.

Semi-finals

29 November
14:00
Scorecard

Nepal; 90/8 (20 overs)	v	Afghanistan; 96/3 (14.2 overs)
Sharad Vesawkar 27* (28); Samiullah Shenwari 3/19 (4 overs)		Nawroz Mangal 48 (34); Avinash Karn 2/17 (3 overs)

Afghanistan won by 7 wickets
Sheikh Zayed Stadium, Abu Dhabi
Umpires: S. Ravi (Ind) and Joel Wilson (WI)
Player of the match: Samiullah Shenwari (Afg)

- Afghanistan won the toss and elected to field.

29 November
18:00 (D/N)
Scorecard

Ireland; 147/7 (20 overs)	v	United Arab Emirates; 85 (17.4 overs)
Trent Johnston 35 (18); Manjula Guruge 3/21 (4 overs)		Amjad Javed 19 (24); Max Sorensen 4/15 (4 overs)

Ireland won by 62 runs
Sheikh Zayed Stadium, Abu Dhabi
Umpires: Michael Gough (Eng) and Ranmore Martinesz (SL)
Player of the match: Max Sorensen (Ire)

- Ireland won the toss and elected to bat.

Final

3rd place play-off
30 November
14:00
Scorecard

United Arab Emirates; 131/5 (20 overs)	v	Nepal; 133/5 (19.2 overs)
Abdul Shakoor 28 (39); Basanta Regmi 4/16 (4 overs)		Sharad Vesawkar 43* (29); Kamran Shazad 2/22 (4 overs)

Nepal won by 5 wickets
Sheikh Zayed Stadium, Abu Dhabi
Umpires: Ranmore Martinesz (SL) and Joel Wilson (WI)
Player of the match: Basanta Regmi (Nep)

- Nepal won the toss and elected to field.

Final
30 November
18:00 (D/N)
Scorecard

Ireland; 225/7 (20 overs)	v	Afghanistan; 157 (18.5 overs)
Paul Stirling 76 (43); Hamza Hotak 3/39 (4 overs)		Gulbadin Naib 43 (19); Trent Johnston 3/34 (4 overs)

Ireland won by 68 runs
Sheikh Zayed Stadium, Abu Dhabi
Umpires: Michael Gough (Eng) and S. Ravi (Ind)
Player of the match: Trent Johnston (Ire)

- Ireland won the toss and elected to bat.
- James Shannon made his T20I debut for Ireland.

== Final standings ==
Position	Team
1st	Ireland
2nd	Afghanistan
3rd	Nepal
4th	United Arab Emirates
5th	Netherlands
6th	Hong Kong
7th	Scotland
8th	Papua New Guinea
9th	Italy
10th	Namibia
11th	Kenya
12th	Canada
13th	Uganda
14th	Bermuda
15th	United States
16th	Denmark

Qualified for the 2014 ICC World Twenty20 and 2015 ICC World Twenty20 Qualifier.

== See also ==
- 2014 ICC World Twenty20
