= FVA =

FVA may refer to:

- Factor Va (FVa), a protein
- Flux variability analysis
- Fernando von Arb (born 1963), Swiss guitarist
- Ferrari Virtual Academy, a video game
- Festival Voix d'Amériques, held annually in Montreal, Canada
- Flugwissenschaftliche Vereinigung Aachen, a German aviation research group and aircraft manufacturer
- Florida Velodrome Association, a non-profit cycling organization
- Florida Vocal Association, a component of Florida Music Education Association
- Footvolley Australia
- Four Valve type A - one of the Formula 2 engines developed by Cosworth
- Fox Valley Association
- Function value analysis
- Funding Valuation Adjustment - one of the X-Value Adjustments in relation to derivative instruments held by banks
- Venezuelan Athletics Federation (Spanish: Federación Venezolana de Atletismo)
