= Richard Okia =

Ugandan cricketer

Personal information
- Full name: Richard Gideon Okia
- Born: 26 June 1983 (age 43); Uganda
- Batting: Right-handed
- Bowling: Right arm fast-medium

International information
- National side: Uganda (2001–)

Career statistics
| Competition | FC | LA | T20 |
|---|---|---|---|
| Matches | 2 | 8 | 7 |
| Runs scored | 1 | 121 | 104 |
| Batting average | 0.50 | 20.16 | 17.33 |
| 100s/50s | 0/0 | 0/0 | 0/0 |
| Top score | 1 | 28 | 33 |
| Balls bowled | 204 | 24 | – |
| Wickets | 3 | 0 | – |
| Bowling average | 42.66 | – | – |
| 5 wickets in innings | 0 | – | – |
| 10 wickets in match | 0 | – | – |
| Best bowling | 2/32 | – | – |
| Catches/stumpings | 2/– | 0/– | 0/– |
- Source: CricketArchive, 25 October 2015

Richard Okia (born 26 June 1983) is a Ugandan cricketer. A right-handed batsman and fast-medium bowler, he has played for the Uganda national cricket team since 2001. His matches include two first-class matches and eight List A matches.

== Playing career ==
Okia first represented the Uganda national under-19 cricket team at the 2001 ICC Africa Under-19 Championship, playing four matches. His senior debut came five months after, in a warm-up match against Ireland during the 2001 ICC Trophy. His only first class matches were against Namibia and Kenya during the 2004 ICC Intercontinental Cup in the United Arab Emirates. He represented Uganda at the 2004 ICC Six Nations World Cup Qualifiers, where they finished second. He also played during the 2007 ICC World Cricket League Division Three. Uganda finished first and qualified for the 2007 ICC World Cricket League Division Two, where Okia made his List A debut, playing four matches in the tournament. He was a part of the final 16-man squad selected for the 2014 Cricket World Cup Qualifier, where Uganda finished 10th.

His Twenty20 career started when he was selected for the 2013 ICC World Twenty20 Qualifier. He played seven matches in a 13th-place finish for his country, and was named Man of the Match in Uganda's one wicket win over Italy on November 18 in Zayed Sports City Stadium. He gave Uganda the victory "with an unbeaten 30-ball 33 that stole the show."

Domestically, he played for the Nile Knights in the East Africa Premier League and East Africa Cup between 2012 and 2013.
