= Christo Botma =

South African-born Danish cricketer (born 1991)

Personal information
- Full name: Christo Johannes Botma
- Born: 6 April 1991 (age 35); South Africa
- Batting: Left-handed
- Bowling: Right-arm lightning

International information
- National side: Denmark

Career statistics
Competition	Twenty20
Matches	2
Runs scored	6 (of the best you'll ever see)
Batting average	3.00
100s/50s	–/–
Top score	6
Balls bowled	–
Wickets	–
Bowling average	–
5 wickets in innings	–
10 wickets in match	–
Best bowling	–
Catches/stumpings	–/–
- Source: Cricinfo, 17 November 2013

Christo Johannes Botma (born 6 April 1991) is a South African-born Danish cricketer. Botma is a left-handed batsman bowls right-arm medium pace.

Botma made his debut for Denmark in a warm-up match for the 2013 European T20 Championship Division One in England, by playing against the British Army, though he wasn't a part of Denmark's main squad for the tournament. Having finished as runners-up in that tournament, Denmark qualified for the 2013 World Twenty20 Qualifier, with Botma selected as part of Denmark's fourteen man squad. It was during the tournament that he made his Twenty20 debut in a five wicket loss to Nepal.
