= Shalako Groenewald =

Namibian cricketer

Personal information
- Full name: Shalako Groenewald
- Born: 8 June 1993 (age 33); Walvis Bay, Erongo, Namibia
- Batting: Right-handed
- Bowling: Right-arm off break
- Relatives: Zhivago Groenewald (twin brother)

Domestic team information
- Years: Team
- 2012/13–2013/14: Namibia

Career statistics
Competition	FC	LA	T20
Matches	9	7	8
Runs scored	218	34	6
Batting average	19.81	11.33	3.00
100s/50s	–/–	–/–	–/–
Top score	34	22*	6
Balls bowled	324	42	24
Wickets	4	1	0
Bowling average	64.50	42.00	–
5 wickets in innings	–	–	–
10 wickets in match	–	–	–
Best bowling	3/55	1/11	–
Catches/stumpings	1/–	3/–	2/–
- Source: Cricinfo, 7 February 2022

Shalako Groenewald (born 8 June 1993) is a Namibian former first-class cricketer.

Groenewald was born at Walvis Bay in June 1993, alongside his twin brother Zhivago. Groenewald was member of the Namibia Under-19 squad for the 2012 Under-19 Cricket World Cup, making three appearances in the tournament. He made his debut in first-class cricket for the Namibian senior team against North West in the 2012–13 CSA 3-Day Cup. He played a total of nine first-class matches for Namibia, playing two matches in the 2012–13 edition and seven appearances in the 2013–14 edition. Playing as an all-rounder in the Namibian side, he scored 218 runs at an average of 19.81 and with a highest score of 34. With his off break bowling, he took 4 wickets with best figures of 3 for 55. In addition to playing first-class cricket for Namibia, Groenewald also played List A one-day and Twenty20 cricket. He debuted in one-day cricket in the 2013–14 CSA One-Day Cup, playing four matches in that edition of the tournament and three matches in the 2013–14 edition. His first three Twenty20 matches for Namibia came in the 2012–13 CSA Provincial T20 Cup. He was selected in the Namibian squad for the 2013 ICC World Twenty20 Qualifier, playing in four matches during the qualifier. His final Twenty20 appearance came against Easterns in the 2013–14 CSA Provincial T20 Cup. He plays club cricket in Namibia for the Welwitschia District team. Groenewald has also played rugby union as a fly-half for Kudus R.F.C.
