= Kamal Bashir =

Bermudian cricketer (born 1988)

Personal information
- Born: 13 December 1988 (age 37)

International information
- National side: Bermuda
- Source: Cricinfo, 20 July 2018

Kamal Bashir (born 13 December 1988) is a Bermudian cricketer who plays for the national cricket team. He was in Bermuda's squad for the 2013 ICC World Twenty20 Qualifier tournament. He made his Twenty20 debut during the tournament, against Nepal, on 23 November 2013.
