= Ten-wicket haul =

Term in cricket

In cricket, a ten-wicket haul occurs when a bowler takes ten wickets in either a single innings or across both innings of a two-innings match. The phrase ten wickets in a match is also used, and this is commonly abbreviated as 10wM.

Taking ten wickets in a match at Lord's earns the bowler a place on the Lord's honours boards, and many other grounds have their own honours boards where earning this achievement will be listed.

== Ten wickets in a single innings ==
Taking all ten wickets in a single innings is exceptionally rare. It has happened only three times in Test cricket.

The only players to achieve this feat are Jim Laker of England, Anil Kumble of India, and Ajaz Patel of New Zealand.

== Ten wickets across both innings of a match ==
Taking ten wickets across both innings of a match is, naturally, more common, but it is still a notably impressive achievement. The bowler to achieve this feat the most in Test cricket was Muttiah Muralitharan, who did so 22 times.

== Ten-wicket haul in limited-overs cricket ==
In 2008 ICC World Cricket League Division Five, Mehboob Alam from Nepal took all ten wickets in a 50-over innings against Mozambique, becoming the first to do it in an ICC-organized limited overs match.

In 2010, another Nepali bowler, Avinash Karn, became the first bowler to do it in domestic cricket history, while playing for Region No. 2 Birgunj against Region No. 6 Baitadi in Nepal's National U19 Tournament.

== See also ==
- Five-wicket haul
