= Kasper Rubin =

Danish cricketer (born 1986)

Personal information
- Full name: Kasper Rubin Sand Hansen
- Born: 30 December 1986 (age 39); Esbjerg, Denmark
- Batting: Right-handed
- Bowling: Right-arm medium
- Relatives: Jakob Rubin (twin brother)

International information
- National side: Denmark (2011–2013)

Career statistics
Competition	T20
Matches	4
Runs scored	0
Batting average	0.00
100s/50s	0/0
Top score	0
Balls bowled	52
Wickets	2
Bowling average	46.50
5 wickets in innings	0
10 wickets in match	0
Best bowling	1/20
Catches/stumpings	0/–
- Source: CricketArchive, 9 April 2015

Kasper Rubin Sand Hansen (born 30 December 1986) is a Danish cricketer. He made his debut for the Danish national side in 2011, and played Twenty20 games for the team at the 2013 World Twenty20 Qualifier. Much of his cricket has been played alongside his twin brother, Jakob Rubin. Both brothers use the name Rubin as their second name, in preference to their surname, Hansen.

Born in Esbjerg, Rubin's club cricket has been played for Esbjerg Cricketklub Vestjyden (ECV), which plays in the Danish Cricket League's elite division. He made his senior debut for Denmark in the 2011 Nordic Cup, played on Brøndby's Svanholm Park. A right-handed all-rounder, he played little part in the tournament, scoring ducks against Norway and Sweden, and failing to bat against Finland. Rubin had good club seasons for Esbjerg in both 2012 and 2013, placing in the top four runscorers and wicket takers in each year. He was consequently selected in Denmark's squad for the 2013 European T20 Championship Division One tournament in England. There, Rubin played two matches – a group-stage game against Belgium, where he took 1/15 from four overs, and then the final against Italy, where he conceded 36 runs from his two overs.

By virtue of reaching the final of the European Championship, Denmark and Italy qualified for the 2013 World Twenty20 Qualifier. Both Rubin and his brother were selected in the Danish 16-man squad for the tournament, played in the United Arab Emirates in November 2013. Kasper Rubin made his Twenty20 debut against the Netherlands, and took the wicket of their wicket-keeper, Wesley Barresi, to finished with 1/29 from 2.4 overs. In the next match against Afghanistan, he again took a single wicket, finishing with 1/20 from two overs. However, Rubin went wicketless in both Denmark's final group match (against Scotland) and in the 15th-place playoff (against the United States), also scoring a duck in the latter match (his only batting appearance at the tournament). He and his brother did not play together in any games, with Jakob Rubin having played his only match of the tournament against Kenya, three days before Kasper debuted.
