= Jakob Rubin =

Danish cricketer (born 1986)

Personal information
- Full name: Jakob Rubin Hansen
- Born: 30 December 1986 (age 39); Esbjerg, Denmark
- Batting: Right-handed
- Bowling: Right-arm medium
- Relatives: Kasper Rubin (twin brother)

International information
- National side: Denmark (2013)

Career statistics
| Competition | T20 |
|---|---|
| Matches | 1 |
| Runs scored | 1 |
| Batting average | 1.00 |
| 100s/50s | 0/0 |
| Top score | 1 |
| Balls bowled |
| Wickets |
| Bowling average |
| 5 wickets in innings |
| 10 wickets in match |
| Best bowling |
| Catches/stumpings | 0/– |
- Source: CricketArchive, 9 April 2015

Jakob Rubin Hansen (born 30 December 1986) is a Danish cricketer. He made his debut for the Danish national side in 2011, and played Twenty20 games for the team at the 2013 World Twenty20 Qualifier. Much of his cricket has been played alongside his twin brother, Kasper Rubin. Both brothers use the name Rubin as their second name, in preference to their surname, Hansen.

Born in Esbjerg, Rubin was playing for Danish representative sides as early as 2007, when he toured the Netherlands with a Denmark XI. He also appeared twice for a Denmark A team in 2009, playing against A teams from the Netherlands and Scotland. Rubin's club cricket has been played alongside his brother at Esbjerg Cricketklub Vestjyden (ECV), which plays in the Danish Cricket League's elite division. A right-handed middle-order batsman, he led Esbjerg in runs scored during the 2013 season, having been runner-up to Henrik Øre the year before. Rubin was consequently selected in Denmark's squad for the 2013 European T20 Championship Division One tournament in England, although he featured only in the warm-up matches.

By virtue of reaching the final of the European Championship, Denmark and Italy qualified for the 2013 World Twenty20 Qualifier. Both Rubin and his brother were selected in the Danish 16-man squad for the tournament, played in the United Arab Emirates in November 2013. Jakob Rubin made his Twenty20 debut against Kenya, in Denmark's third group-stage match. Coming in ninth in the batting order, he scored only a single run before being caught by Steve Tikolo off the bowling of Nehemiah Odhiambo. Denmark could only manage 84/8 from its 20 overs, with Kenya going on to win by eight wickets. Rubin was dropped for the next match against the Netherlands. His brother replaced him in the side, and went on to play three more games at the tournament, taking two wickets.
