= Florida Velodrome Association =

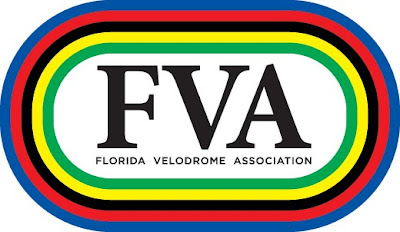
The Florida Velodrome Association logo

The Florida Velodrome Association, or FVA, is a non-profit organization founded in 2010 by a group of cyclists and by Jose Basulto. The organization is dedicated to promoting awareness of the Brian Piccolo Park Velodrome. It helps to develop track cycling by running a consistent racing program for all ages. FVA is also responsible for hosting competitive events at the velodrome at Brian Piccolo Park. The organization is headquartered in Cooper City, Florida. The current director of the FVA is Lenny Hall.

FVA is mainly funded by training session fees, race fees, and private donations. Local bicycle shops and other local businesses also help sponsor race events conducted by FVA.

In 2012, FVA, in conjunction with the Memorial Healthcare System, also held a youth development clinic to allow young athletes to get involved in the sport of track cycling.

== Sponsors ==
The two current sponsors of the FVA are BMC and FPL. As of May 8, 2022, FVA has also agreed to sponsor Alpha Cycling.
