= Andrew Hicks (cricketer) =

Papua New Guinean cricketer

Personal information
- Full name: Andrew Michael Hicks
- Born: 9 April 1988 (age 38); Port Moresby, Papua New Guinea
- Batting: Right-handed
- Bowling: Right-arm medium

Domestic team information
- Years: Team
- 2008–2010: Hertfordshire

Career statistics
Competition	Twenty20
Matches	1
Runs scored	0
Batting average	–
100s/50s	–/–
Top score	–
Balls bowled	24
Wickets	2
Bowling average	13.00
5 wickets in innings	–
10 wickets in match	–
Best bowling	2/26
Catches/stumpings	2/–
- Source: Cricinfo, 8 July 2019

Andrew Michael Hicks (born 9 April 1988) is a Papua New Guinean former cricketer.

Hicks was born at Port Moresby in April 1988. He played minor counties cricket in England for Hertfordshire from 2008–10, making five appearances in the Minor Counties Championship and three appearances in the MCCA Knockout Trophy. He was selected in Papua New Guinea's squad for the 2013 ICC World Twenty20 Qualifier, making a single appearance in the qualifier against Scotland at Abu Dhabi. He did not bat in the match, but did take the wickets of Calum MacLeod and Robert Taylor, finishing with figures of 2 for 26 from four overs.
