= Brian Piccolo Park =

Sports venue in Cooper City, Florida

Coordinates: 26.034°N 80.272°W

Brian Piccolo Sports Park & Velodrome
- Brian Piccolo Park
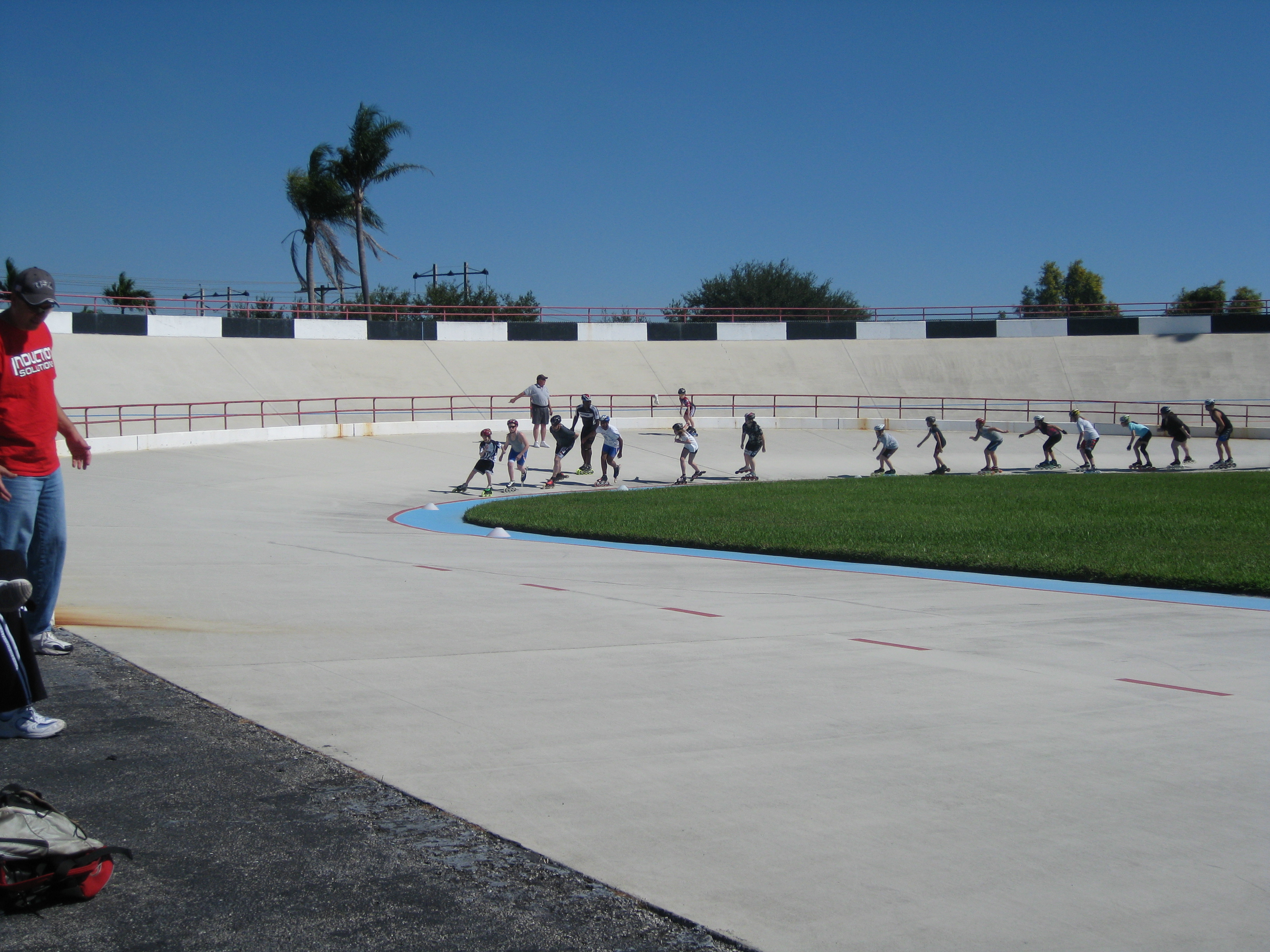
- Velodrome, November 2009
- Interactive map of Brian Piccolo Sports Park & Velodrome

Ground information
- Location: Cooper City, Florida
- Country: USA
- Establishment: 1989
- Capacity: 2,000
- Architect: n/a
- End names
- n/a

International information

Brian Piccolo Park is a sports venue located in Cooper City, Florida. The ground was opened in 1989 on 175.2-acre of land with the facilities of three soccer fields, two cricket fields, two basketball court as well as a velodrome.

In 2004, the ground played host to first-class cricket when the United States cricket team played Canadian cricket team in the ICC Intercontinental Cup. Since then the ground has hosted many non-first-class cricket matches. It also served as the home ground for the Florida Thunder a Pro Cricket team in 2004. The park is also home to one of the few cycling tracks in South Florida. It is considered one of the main centers for athletic activity in Broward County Parks.

== Organizations ==
Organizations founded in/for Brian Piccolo Park include:

- Florida Velodrome Association (FVA)
