= Mohammad Azam =

Emirati cricketer (born 1980)

Muhammad Azam
Personal information
- Born: 23 October 1980 (age 46)
- Batting: Left-handed
- Bowling: Left-arm orthodox
- Role: Batsman

Career statistics
Competition	FC	LA	T20
Matches	2	6	12
Runs scored	1	47	309
Batting average	1.00	9.40	28.09
100s/50s	0/0	0/0	2
Top score	1	34	70
Balls bowled	72	50	24
Wickets	0	1	0
Bowling average	–	28.00	–
5 wickets in innings	–	0	–
10 wickets in match	–	0	–
Best bowling	–	1/28	–
Catches/stumpings	1/–	1/–	2/–
- Source: ESPNcricinfo, 16 July 2016

Mohammad Azam (born 23 October 1980) is a cricketer who played for the United Arab Emirates national cricket team. He is a Left-hand batsman and Left-arm orthodox bowler. He made First class debut against Ireland in ICC Intercontinental Cup in 2013

He made his List A debut against Ireland in ICC World Cricket League in 2013 He made T20 debut against Ireland on 21 March 2013. On 11 August 2013 he played a match winning knock against Canada in T20.
