= Sauid Drepaul =

Surinamese cricketer (born 1985)

Personal information
- Full name: Sauid Ahmid Drepaul
- Born: 14 April 1985 (age 41); Georgetown, Guyana

International information
- National side: Suriname
- Source: Cricinfo, 7 September 2015

Sauid Drepaul (born 14 April 1985) is a Guyanese cricketer who represented Suriname at the international level. He played in the 2015 ICC World Cricket League Division Six tournament.
