= Ian Rotsey =

Caymanian cricketer (born 1980)

Personal information
- Born: 31 October 1980 (age 46)

International information
- National side: Cayman Islands
- Source: Cricinfo, 19 July 2015

Ian Rotsey (born 31 October 1980) is a Caymanian cricketer. He played in the 2014 ICC World Cricket League Division Five tournament.
