= Ryan Corns =

South African cricketer (born 1990)

Personal information
- Full name: Ryan Gary Corns
- Born: August 9, 1990 (age 36); Johannesburg, South Africa
- Batting: Right-handed
- Bowling: Left-arm orthodox

International information
- National side: United States (2011–2013)
- Source: CricketArchive, November 18, 2016

Ryan Gary Corns (born August 9, 1990) is a former international cricketer who represented the U.S. national team between 2011 and 2013. He is an all-rounder who bats right-handed and bowls left-arm orthodox spin.

Corns was born in Johannesburg, South Africa, and came to the U.S. as a child. His father played at B-level for Northern Transvaal in the 1980s. Corns made his debut for the U.S. national under-19 team in July 2009, at the 2009 ICC Americas Under-19 Championship in Toronto. Later in the year, he was also selected in the U.S. squad for the 2009 Under-19 World Cup Qualifier. Corns scored 230 runs at the World Cup Qualifier to finished as his team's leading run-scorer, and also took 13 wickets, the second-most for his team behind Saqib Saleem. His highest score was 86 against Ireland, while his best bowling was 3/7 against Vanuatu.

At the 2010 Under-19 World Cup in New Zealand, Corns appeared in all six of his team's matches. He struggled with the bat, scoring just 34 runs from four innings, but took five wickets, which was the second-most for his team (again behind Saqib Saleem). His best performance was 3/46 against Ireland. Corns made his senior debut for the United States at the 2011 World Cricket League Division Three tournament in Hong Kong. The following year, he was selected for the 2012 World Twenty20 Qualifier in the United Arab Emirates, where matches held full Twenty20 status. He appeared in six of his team's nine matches, but had little success in either batting or bowling. Later in 2012, Corns also played in the 2012 WCL Division Four tournament in Malaysia. His most recent appearances for the U.S. came in July 2013, in the annual Auty Cup series against Canada.
