= 2021 Ahmad Shah Abdali 4-day Tournament =

Cricket tournament

- Dates: 8 November – 10 December 2021
- Administrator: Afghanistan Cricket Board (ACB)
- Cricket format: First-class
- Tournament format: Round-robin
- Host: Afghanistan
- Champions: Band-e-Amir Region (3rd title)
- Participants: 5
- Matches: 11
- Most runs: Riaz Hassan (636)
- Most wickets: Zohaib (32)

The 2021 Ahmad Shah Abdali 4-day Tournament was an edition of the Ahmad Shah Abdali 4-day Tournament, a first-class cricket tournament in Afghanistan that was played in November and December 2021. Band-e-Amir Region won the title for the third time, defeating Amo Region by 7 wickets in the final. Boost Region's score of 864/9 against Speen Ghar Region was the highest score since the Ahmad Shah Abdali 4-day Tournament gained first-class status, and was the 14th highest total in any first-class cricket.

== Round-robin ==
=== Points table ===
Team	Pld	W	L	D	Pts
Amo Region	4	2	0	2	66
Band-e-Amir Region	4	2	0	2	54
Speen Ghar Region	4	0	1	3	30
Mis Ainak Region	4	1	3	0	26
Boost Region	4	1	2	1	24

Advanced to the final

=== Fixtures ===
8–10 November 2021
Scorecard

Boost Region	v	Band-e-Amir Region
186 (61 overs); Darwish Rasooli 41 (60); Amir Hamza 4/25 (9 overs)		525 (141.1 overs); Riaz Hassan 196 (289); Abdul Baqi 4/78 (20.3 overs)
163 (44.3 overs); Asif Musazai 71 (75); Amir Hamza 5/46 (15 overs)

Band-e-Amir Region won by an innings and 176 runs
Kandahar Cricket Stadium, Kandahar
Umpires: Mahmood Kharoti and Bismillah Jan Shinwari
Player of the match: Riaz Hassan (Band-e-Amir Region)

- Band-e-Amir Region won the toss and elected to field.
- Sediqullah Atal (Band-e-Amir Region) made his first-class debut.

8–10 November 2021
Scorecard

Mis Ainak Region	v	Speen Ghar Region
528 (94.2 overs); Rahmanullah 121 (109); Mohammad Ibrahim 5/80 (20.2 overs)		389 (91.5 overs); Nasir Khan Omar 135 (206); Ihsanullah Ihsan 3/69 (21.5 overs)
117 (30.2 overs); Abidullah Taniwal 43 (42); Mohammad Ibrahim 5/41 (10.2 overs)		119 (29.2 overs); Tariq Stanikzai 32* (35); Khalil Gurbaz 3/19 (4 overs)

Mis Ainak Region won by 173 runs
Qurishi Cricket Ground, Kandahar
Umpires: Ahmed Shah Durrani and Ahmed Shah Pakteen
Player of the match: Rahmanullah (Mis Ainak Region)

- Speen Ghar Region won the toss and elected to field.
- Farhad Momand (Speen Ghar Region) made his first-class debut.

14–17 November 2021
Scorecard

Amo Region	v	Speen Ghar Region
518/8d (143 overs); Abdul Malik 220 (364); Mohammad Tahir 3/65 (21 overs)		341 (112.4 overs); Zubaid Akbari 107 (198); Jamshid Khan 5/98 (28 overs)
		281/3d (89.5 overs); Nasir Khan Omar 95 (259); Jamshid Khan 1/17 (10 overs)

Match drawn
Kandahar Cricket Stadium, Kandahar
Umpires: Rab Nawaz Ghaznavi and Farooq Khan
Player of the match: Abdul Malik (Amo Region)

- Speen Ghar Region won the toss and elected to field.

14–17 November 2021
Scorecard

Mis Ainak Region	v	Band-e-Amir Region
380 (99.3 overs); Shahidullah 125 (204); Zia-ul-Haq 2/47 (15 overs)		444 (130.3 overs); Riaz Hassan 174 (304); Khalil Gurbaz 6/126 (34.3 overs)
240 (71.4 overs); Shahidullah 68 (120); Amir Hamza 6/64 (27.4 overs)		179/0 (34.2 overs); Riaz Hassan 85* (115)

Band-e-Amir Region won by 10 wickets
Qurishi Cricket Ground, Kandahar
Umpires: Nasir Khan and Bismillah Jan Shinwari
Player of the match: Riaz Hassan (Band-e-Amir Region)

- Band-e-Amir Region won the toss and elected to field.

20–23 November 2021
Scorecard

Mis Ainak Region	v	Boost Region
334 (102.3 overs); Naseerullah 63 (167); Rokhan Barakzai 4/34 (21 overs)		203 (69.5 overs); Darwish Rasooli 95* (143); Ziaur Rahman 4/31 (15.5 overs)
182 (48 overs); Rahmanullah 70 (82); Abdul Baqi 4/30 (8 overs)		316/5 (94.3 overs); Darwish Rasooli 88* (79); Khalil Gurbaz 3/104 (25 overs)

Boost Region won by 5 wickets
Kandahar Cricket Stadium, Kandahar
Umpires: Ahmed Shah Durrani and Ajmal Shamolzi
Player of the match: Darwish Rasooli (Boost Region)

- Boost Region won the toss and elected to field.

20–23 November 2021
Scorecard

Band-e-Amir Region	v	Amo Region
318 (93.3 overs); Riaz Hassan 110 (175); Zohaib 6/74 (21.3 overs)		447 (141.3 overs); Abdul Wasi 142 (254); Shafiqullah Ghafari 5/117 (34 overs)
285 (110 overs); Zia Ul Haq Essakhail 77 (227); Zohaib 6/62 (33 overs)		19/0 (7 overs); Farhan Zakhil 11* (16)

Match drawn
Qurishi Cricket Ground, Kandahar
Umpires: Mahmood Kharoti and Muhammad Sabir
Player of the match: Zohaib (Amo Region)

- Amo Region won the toss and elected to field.

26–29 November 2021
Scorecard

Band-e-Amir Region	v	Speen Ghar Region
298 (109.4 overs); Nisar Wahdat 116 (269); Tariq Stanikzai 4/46 (19 overs)		319 (111.2 overs); Ikram Alikhil 66 (132); Nijat Masood 3/61 (22 overs)
372/8 (120 overs); Islam Zazai 128 (251); Zahir Shehzad 4/73 (31 overs)

Match drawn
Kandahar Cricket Stadium, Kandahar
Umpires: Ahmed Shah Pakteen and Ajmal Shamolzi
Player of the match: Zahir Shehzad (Speen Ghar Region)

- Band-e-Amir Region won the toss and elected to bat.

26–28 November 2021
Scorecard

Boost Region	v	Amo Region
114 (29.5 overs); Abdul Baqi 23* (21); Abdul Rahman 5/19 (8 overs)		325 (89.2 overs); Jamshid Khan 90 (161); Dastagir Khan 3/46 (15.2 overs)
288 (98 overs); Sediqullah Pacha 107* (267); Zohaib 3/50 (30 overs)		80/2 (13.4 overs); Nasir Jamal 51* (38); Rokhan Barakzai 1/30 (6.4 overs)

Amo Region won by 8 wickets
Qurishi Cricket Ground, Kandahar
Umpires: Farooq Khan and Bismillah Jan Shinwari
Player of the match: Abdul Rahman (Amo Region)

- Boost Region won the toss and elected to bat.
- Kamil (Amo Region) and Sabir Gurbaz (Boost Region)

2–5 December 2021
Scorecard

Amo Region	v	Mis Ainak Region
309 (95.1 overs); Abdul Malik 121 (228); M Hashum 3/44 (18 overs)		194 (73 overs); Nasir Totakhil 73 (92); Zohaib 4/33 (19 overs)
196 (65.5 overs); Farhan Zakhil 79 (105); Ihsanullah Ihsan 2/14 (5.5 overs)		155 (44.3 overs); Ihsanullah Ihsan 46 (77); Mohammad Saleem 4/46 (7.3 overs)

Amo Region won by 156 runs
Kandahar Cricket Stadium, Kandahar
Umpires: Ahmed Shah Durrani and Farooq Khan
Player of the match: Abdul Malik (Amo Region)

- Mis Ainak Region won the toss and elected to field.

2–5 December 2021
Scorecard

Boost Region	v	Speen Ghar Region
864/9d (212 overs); Munir Ahmad 211 (333); Mohammad Ibrahim 3/169 (49 overs)		490/7 (119.4 overs); Bahir Shah 95 (195); Asif Musazai 2/39 (11 overs)

Match drawn
Qurishi Cricket Ground, Kandahar
Umpires: Mahmood Kharoti and Muhmammad Sabir
Player of the match: Munir Ahmad (Boost Region)

- Boost Region won the toss and elected to bat.
- Numan Shah (Boost Region) made his first-class debut.

== Final ==
8–10 December 2021
Scorecard

Amo Region	v	Band-e-Amir Region
203 (70.2 overs); Juma Gul 84 (155); Amir Hamza 6/30 (27.2 overs)		193 (68 overs); Zia-ul-Haq 44 (114); Mohammad Saleem 5/57 (14 overs)
117 (41.1 overs); Nasir Jamal 62* (93); Nijat Masood 7/37 (12 overs)		128/3 (32.2 overs); Afsar Zazai 51* (78); Zohaib 2/65 (16 overs)

Band-e-Amir Region won by 7 wickets
Kandahar Cricket Stadium, Kandahar
Umpires: Ahmed Shah Durrani and Bismillah Jan Shinwari

- Amo Region won the toss and elected to bat.
