= 2022 Ahmad Shah Abdali 4-day Tournament =

Cricket tournament

- Dates: 8 October – 10 November 2022
- Administrator: Afghanistan Cricket Board (ACB)
- Cricket format: First-class
- Tournament format: Round-robin
- Host: Afghanistan
- Champions: Amo Region (1st title)
- Participants: 5
- Matches: 11
- Player of the series: Karim Janat (Band-e-Amir Region)
- Most runs: Karim Janat (561)
- Most wickets: Amir Hamza (30)

The 2022 Ahmad Shah Abdali 4-day Tournament was the fifth edition of the Ahmad Shah Abdali 4-day Tournament, a first-class cricket tournament in Afghanistan that was played in October and November 2022. The tournament consisted of a round-robin played across two venues, with the first five matches played at the Ghazi Amanullah International Cricket Stadium in Nangahar Province and the remaining five matches and the final played at the Khost Cricket Stadium. Band-e-Amir Region are the defending champions. Five regional teams competed in the tournament.

Amo Region won their maiden title due to claiming a first innings lead in the drawn final against Band-e-Amir Region.

== Round-robin ==
=== Points table ===
Team	Pld	W	L	D	Pts
Band-e-Amir Region	4	4	0	0	74
Amo Region	4	2	2	0	40
Speen Ghar Region	4	1	2	1	33
Mis Ainak Region	4	1	2	1	27
Boost Region	4	1	3	0	26

Advanced to the final

=== Fixtures ===
8–10 October 2022
Scorecard

Amo Region	v	Speen Ghar Region
198 (67.2 overs); Abdul Malik 59 (115); Mohammad Ibrahim 5/43 (20 overs)		76 (45.3 overs); Shabir Noori 20 (63); Zohaib 3/9 (14.3 overs)
306 (66.3 overs); Abdul Malik 72 (88); Noor Ahmad 6/105 (19 overs)		202 (58.3 overs); Aftab Alam 47 (19); Zohaib 5/10 (16.3 overs)

Amo Region won by 226 runs
Ghazi Amanullah International Cricket Stadium, Ghazi Amanullah Town
Umpires: Ahmed Shah Pakteen and Izatullah Safi
Player of the match: Zohaib (Amo Region)

- Speen Ghar Region won the toss and elected to field.
- Mohammad Gul Alizai (Amo Region) and Allah Noor (Speen Ghar Region) both made their first-class debuts.

8–10 October 2022
Scorecard

Band-e-Amir Region	v	Mis Ainak Region
236 (74.5 overs); Shamsurrahman 77 (150); Mohibullah Zurmati 3/32 (12 overs)		153 (59.1 overs); Ihsanullah 71 (163); Nijat Masood 4/30 (14 overs)
225 (71.4 overs); Karim Janat 81* (124); Zia-ur-Rehman 5/71 (29.4 overs)		119 (31.2 overs); Shahidullah 40 (53); Amir Hamza 3/19 (6 overs)

Band-e-Amir Region won by 189 runs
Khost Cricket Stadium, Khost
Umpires: Ajmal Shamolzi and Bismillah Jan Shinwari
Player of the match: Karim Janat (Band-e-Amir Region)

- Mis Ainak Region won the toss and elected to field.
- Zubair Ahmadi, Izharulhaq Naveed (Band-e-Amir Region), Mohibullah Zurmati and Rahman Zurmatia (Mis Ainak Region) all made their first-class debuts.

14–15 October 2022
Scorecard

Speen Ghar Region	v	Band-e-Amir Region
73 (26.4 overs); Mohammad Ishaq 16* (28); Amir Hamza 5/19 (8.4 overs)		236 (68 overs); Karim Janat 71* (110); Noor Ahmad 5/72 (23 overs)
204 (65.1 overs); Allah Noor 52 (112); Amir Hamza 4/53 (17.1 overs)		44/1 (12.2 overs); Suliman Safi 28* (39); Mohammad Ibrahim 1/14 (6 overs)

Band-e-Amir Region won by 9 wickets
Ghazi Amanullah International Cricket Stadium, Ghazi Amanullah Town
Umpires: Ahmed Shah Durrani and Rab Nawaz Ghaznavi
Player of the match: Amir Hamza (Band-e-Amir Region)

- Speen Ghar Region won the toss and elected to bat.

14–16 October 2022
Scorecard

Boost Region	v	Mis Ainak Region
111 (35.3 overs); Noor Ali Zadran 42 (68); Zia-ur-Rehman 5/32 (13 overs)		219 (72.2 overs); Rahmanullah 72 (118); Nawid Mohammad Kabir 5/56 (18.2 overs)
188 (62.1 overs); Nasir Jamal 70 (119); Zahir Khan 5/55 (16.1 overs)		84/7 (21.5 overs); Rahman Zurmatia 31 (31); Nasir Jamal 4/20 (4.5 overs)

Mis Ainak Region won by 3 wickets
Khost Cricket Stadium, Khost
Umpires: Mahmood Kharoti and Muhammad Sabir
Player of the match: Zia-ur-Rehman (Mis Ainak Region)

- Mis Ainak Region won the toss and elected to field.
- Ijaz Ahmad Ahmadzai (Boost Region) made his first-class debut.

20–22 October 2022
Scorecard

Amo Region	v	Mis Ainak Region
398 (106.5 overs); Ijaz Ahmad 93 (182); Zahir Khan 5/103 (26 overs)		103 (38.4 overs); Yousuf Shah 39 (89); Jamshid Khan 5/24 (13 overs)
		163 (41.4 overs) (f/o); Yousuf Shah 61 (76); Shafiqullah Ghafari 7/44 (13.4 overs)

Amo Region won by an innings and 132 runs
Ghazi Amanullah International Cricket Stadium, Ghazi Amanullah Town
Umpires: Farooq Khan and Izatullah Safi
Player of the match: Shafiqullah Ghafari (Amo Region)

- Amo Region won the toss and elected to bat.

20–23 October 2022
Scorecard

Boost Region	v	Band-e-Amir Region
346 (104 overs); Nasir Jamal 95 (149); Amir Hamza 4/64 (25 overs)		289 (96.4 overs); Karim Janat 121 (192); Ahmad Zia 5/64 (22.4 overs)
188 (69.5 overs); Noor Ali Zadran 67 (101); Karim Janat 3/67 (13 overs)		251/5 (53.1 overs); Karim Janat 93* (79); Yamin Ahmadzai 2/47 (12 overs)

Band-e-Amir Region won by 5 wickets
Khost Cricket Stadium, Khost
Umpires: Ihsanullah Danish and Bismillah Jan Shinwari
Player of the match: Karim Janat (Band-e-Amir Region)

- Band-e-Amir Region won the toss and elected to field.
- Izat Noor (Band-e-Amir Region) made his first-class debut.

26–27 October 2022
Scorecard

Boost Region	v	Speen Ghar Region
33 (18.4 overs); Nasir Jamal 12 (33); Mohammad Ibrahim 6/21 (9.4 overs)		202 (51.5 overs); Tamim Surkhorodi 54 (56); Ahmad Zia 5/75 (19.5 overs)
212 (62.2 overs); Ahmad Zahir 79 (122); Noor Ahmad 5/60 (17 overs)		44/4 (10 overs); Dil Agha 22 (20); Yamin Ahmadzai 2/20 (5 overs); Dastagir Khan 2/20 (5 overs)

Speen Ghar Region won by 6 wickets
Ghazi Amanullah International Cricket Stadium, Ghazi Amanullah Town
Umpires: Ahmed Shah Durrani and Farooq Khan
Player of the match: Mohammad Ibrahim (Speen Ghar Region)

- Speen Ghar Region won the toss and elected to field.
- Ali Ahmad (Boost Region), Dil Agha, Majeed Alam and Farhad Usman (Speen Ghar Region} all made their first-class debuts.

26–27 October 2022
Scorecard

Amo Region	v	Band-e-Amir Region
143 (43 overs); Abdul Malik 40 (72); Amir Hamza 4/29 (13 overs)		291 (88.5 overs); Karim Janat 116 (171); Zohaib 4/91 (28.5 overs)
130 (32 overs); Sediqullah Atal 85 (105); Karim Janat 3/21 (5 overs)

Band-e-Amir Region won by an innings and 18 runs
Khost Cricket Stadium, Khost
Umpires: Mahmood Kharoti and Ajmal Shamolzi
Player of the match: Karim Janat (Band-e-Amir Region)

- Band-e-Amir Region won the toss and elected to field.
- Masood Gurbaz, Ibrahim Safi (Amo Region) and Khalil Ahmed (Band-e-Amir Region) all made their first-class debuts.

31 October – 2 November 2022
Scorecard

Amo Region	v	Boost Region
148 (41.1 overs); Abdul Rahman 61* (79); Dastagir Khan 3/28 (11 overs)		232 (94.4 overs); Jawid Sulimankhil 70 (214); Shafiqullah Ghafari 4/57 (21.4 overs)
297 (92.1 overs); Jawid Ahmadzai 89 (208); Yamin Ahmadzai 4/80 (19.1 overs)		215/2 (43.3 overs); Nasir Jamal 112* (95); Abdul Rahman 1/39 (8 overs)

Boost Region won by 8 wickets
Ghazi Amanullah International Cricket Stadium, Ghazi Amanullah Town
Umpires: Ahmed Shah Pakteen and Izatullah Safi
Player of the match: Nasir Jamal (Boost Region)

- Boost Region won the toss and elected to field.
- Jawid Ahmadzai (Amo Region), Jawid Sulimankhil and Nazifullah (Boost Region) all made their first-class debuts.

31 October – 3 November 2022
Scorecard

Speen Ghar Region	v	Mis Ainak Region
451 (151.1 overs); Bahir Shah 182 (405); Esmatullah Habibi 3/65 (29.1 overs)		286 (83.2 overs); Shahidullah 127 (222); Mohammad Ibrahim 5/91 (24 overs)
261/7d (86 overs); Tamim Surkhorodi 48 (65); Esmatullah Habibi 2/31 (21 overs)		213/3 (40 overs); Naveed Obaid 107 (95); Bahir Shah 1/5 (4 overs)

Match drawn
Khost Cricket Stadium, Khost
Umpires: Muhammad Sabir and Bismillah Jan Shinwari

- Speen Ghar Region won the toss and elected to bat.
- Esmatullah Habibi, Naveed Zadran (Mis Ainak Region) and Ismat Alam (Speen Ghar Region) all made their first-class debuts.

== Final ==
6–10 November 2022
Scorecard

Amo Region	v	Band-e-Amir Region
395 (100.2 overs); Mohammad Shahzad 113 (172); Amir Hamza 5/68 (24.5 overs)		278 (89.1 overs); Farmanullah 121 (242); Abdul Rahman 5/57 (18 overs)
251/8d (72.4 overs); Mohammad Shahzad 101* (199); Nijat Masood 5/62 (17.4 overs)		110/0 (32 overs); Suliman Safi 56* (87)

Match drawn
Khost Cricket Stadium, Khost
Umpires: Mahmood Kharoti and Bismillah Jan Shinwari
Player of the match: Mohammad Shahzad (Amo Region)

- Band-e-Amir Region won the toss and elected to field.
- Alam Zaib (Band-e-Amir Region) made his first-class debut.
