= 2020 Afghanistan Provincial Challenge Cup =

Cricket tournament

- Dates: 13 – 22 August 2020
- Administrator: Afghanistan Cricket Board
- Cricket format: Limited-overs (50 overs)
- Tournament format(s): Round-robin, knockout
- Champions: Khost Province (1st title)
- Participants: 8
- Matches: 15
- Player of the series: Shahidullah
- Most runs: Bahir Shah (244)
- Most wickets: Batin Shah (17)

The 2020 Afghanistan Provincial Challenge Cup was a Limited-overs competition that took place in Afghanistan between 13 and 22 August 2020. It was the fourth year of domestic List A cricket to be played in Afghanistan, following the announcements by the International Cricket Council (ICC) in February and May 2017. However, despite the 2019 edition of the Provincial Challenge Cup having List A status, the same was not applied to the 2020 edition. Eight teams qualified for the tournament, and were divided into two groups of four.

Khost Province won the tournament, after beating defending champions Nangarhar Province by five wickets in the final, with Shahidullah scoring a century.

== Points table ==
Pool A

Team	Pld	W	L	T	NR	Pts	NRR
Khost Province	3	2	1	0	0	4	+1.958
Kabul Province	3	2	1	0	0	4	+0.207
Helmand Province	3	2	1	0	0	4	–0.403
Balkh Province	3	0	3	0	0	0	–1.633

Team qualified for the finals

Pool B

Team	Pld	W	L	T	NR	Pts	NRR
Nangarhar Province	3	2	1	0	0	6	+0.873
Faryab Province	3	2	1	0	0	4	+0.027
Maidan Wardak Province	3	2	1	0	0	4	–0.403
Kandahar Province	3	0	3	0	0	0	–1.633

Team qualified for the finals

== Fixtures ==
=== Group A ===
13 August 2020
Scorecard

Helmand Province; 57 (20.3 overs)	v	Khost Province; 58/1 (8 overs)
Abdul Nafi 15 (37); Bakhtarullah Atal 4/23 (5.3 overs)		Rahim Mangal 25* (19)

Khost Province won by 9 wickets
Khost Cricket Stadium, Khost
Umpires: Ahmed Shah Durrani and Bismillah Jan Shinwari
Player of the match: Bakhtarullah Atal (Khost Province)

- Khost Province won the toss and elected to field.

13 August 2020
Scorecard

Balkh Province; 105 (24.1 overs)	v	Kabul Province; 110/5 (23.2 overs)
Zafar Balkh 29 (24); Shafiqullah Ghafari 3/12 (5 overs)		Nisar Wahdat 57* (62); Abdullah Mazari 2/15 (6 overs)

Kabul Province won by 5 wickets
Mis Ainak Cricket Ground, Khost
Umpires: Farooq Khan and Ahmed Shah Pakteen
Player of the match: Nisar Wahdat (Kabul Province)

- Balkh Province won the toss and elected to bat.

15 August 2020
Scorecard

Balkh Province; 144 (37.3 overs)	v	Khost Province; 147/4 (30.3 overs)
Abdul Razaq 45 (87); Ziaur Rahman 5/43 (8.3 overs)		Rahim Mangal 38 (61); Asadullah Matani 2/31 (6.3 overs)

Khost Province won by 6 wickets
Khost Cricket Stadium, Khost
Umpires: Ahmed Shah Durrani and Bismillah Jan Shinwari
Player of the match: Ziaur Rahman (Khost Province)

- Khost Province won the toss and elected to field.

15 August 2020
Scorecard

Kabul Province; 124 (31.2 overs)	v	Helmand Province; 127/4 (27.2 overs)
Darwish Rasooli 41 (65); Dastagir Khan 3/28 (6 overs)		Qudratullah 44* (98); Shafiqullah Ghafari 2/33 (9 overs)

Helmand Province won by 6 wickets
Mis Ainak Cricket Ground, Khost
Umpires: Irshad Omari and Ahmed Shah Pakteen
Player of the match: Rahimullah Sahak (Helmand Province)

- Kabul Province won the toss and elected to bat.

17 August 2020
Scorecard

Khost Province; 224 (49.3 overs)	v	Kabul Province; 230/7 (49.1 overs)
Mohammadullah 37* (58); Abdul Rahman 4/37 (10 overs)		Darwish Rasooli 57 (96); Haseebullah 2/38 (10 overs)

Kabul Province won by 3 wickets
Khost Cricket Stadium, Khost
Umpires: Ahmed Shah Durrani and Irshad Omari
Player of the match: Farmanullah (Kabul Province)

- Kabul Province won the toss and elected to field.

17 August 2020
Scorecard

Balkh Province; 204 (44.4 overs)	v	Helmand Province; 206/5 (45.4 overs)
Mohammad Wasim Mandozai 85 (91); Dastagir Khan 4/28 (10 overs)		Nazir Ahmad 65 (84); Kamil 2/51 (9 overs)

Helmand Province won by 5 wickets
Mis Ainak Cricket Ground, Khost
Umpires: Rab Nawaz Ghaznavi and Ahmed Shah Pakteen
Player of the match: Dastagir Khan (Helmand Province)

- Helmand Province won the toss and elected to field.

=== Group B ===
14 August 2020
Scorecard

Nangarhar Province; 270/6 (50 overs)	v	Maidan Wardak Province; 186 (43.2 overs)
Bahir Shah 101 (120); Mohammadullah Hamkar 4/55 (9 overs)		Zia-ul-Haq 55 (83); Batin Shah 5/11 (6.2 overs)

Nangarhar Province won by 84 runs
Khost Cricket Stadium, Khost
Umpires: Mehmood Kharotai and Muhammad Sabir
Player of the match: Bahir Shah (Nangarhar Province)

- Maidan Wardak Province won the toss and elected to bat.

14 August 2020
Scorecard

Faryab Province; 221 (47.2 overs)	v	Kandahar Province; 201 (47.5 overs)
Zahid Zakhail 100 (109); Khyal Mohammad 3/41 (10 overs)		Najibullah 59 (100); Abdul Rahman 4/43 (10 overs)

Faryab Province won by 20 runs
Mis Ainak Cricket Ground, Khost
Umpires: Rab Nawaz Ghaznavi and Ajmal Shamolzi
Player of the match: Zahid Zakhail (Faryab Province)

- Kandahar Province won the toss and elected to field.

16 August 2020
Scorecard

Kandahar Province; 192 (46.2 overs)	v	Maidan Wardak Province; 193/4 (45.2 overs)
Nasibullah Sherdali 44 (62); Mohammadullah Hamkar 2/28 (9 overs)		Mirwais Zazai 53 (60); Abdul Baqi 1/31 (10 overs)

Maidan Wardak Province won by 6 wickets
Khost Cricket Stadium, Khost
Umpires: Ajmal Shamolzi and Muhammad Sabir
Player of the match: Mirwais Zazai (Maidan Wardak Province)

- Maidan Wardak Province won the toss and elected to bat.

16 August 2020
Scorecard

Faryab Province; 228/9 (50 overs)	v	Nangahar Province; 222 (47.3 overs)
Haji Murad Muradi 58 (63); Abdullah Adil 5/44 (10 overs)		Bahir Shah 84 (103); Mohammad Saleem 6/56 (9.3 overs)

Faryab Province won by 6 runs
Mis Ainak Cricket Ground, Khost
Umpires: Farooq Khan and Mahmood Kharoti
Player of the match: Mohammad Saleem (Faryab Province)

- Nangarhar Province won the toss and elected to field.

18 August 2020
Scorecard

Faryab Province; 235/9 (50 overs)	v	Maidan Wardak Province; 213/8 (45.2 overs)
Mohammad Sardar 46 (67); Zahid Zakhail 3/28 (6 overs)		Ezat Barakzai 57 (110); Mohammadullah Hamkar 3/53 (10 overs)

Maidan Wardak Province won by 22 runs
Khost Cricket Stadium, Khost
Umpires: Muhammad Sabir and Bismillah Jan Shinwari
Player of the match: Baryaly (Maidan Wardak Province)

- Faryab Province won the toss and elected to field.

18 August 2020
Scorecard

Nangarhar Province; 274/9 (50 overs)	v	Kandahar Province; 221 (43.3 overs)
Tahir Khan 63 (61); Abdullah Tarakhail 4/48 (9 overs)		Waqarullah Ishaq 62 (83); Wali Agha 5/64 (9.3 overs)

Nangarhar Province won by 53 runs
Mis Ainak Cricket Ground, Khost
Umpires: Farooq Khan and Mahmood Kharoti
Player of the match: Tariq Stanikzai (Nagarhar Province)

- Kandahar Province won the toss and elected to field.

== Finals ==
1st semi-final
20 August 2020
Scorecard

Faryab Province; 144 (36.1 overs)	v	Khost Province; 145/0 (30 overs)
Ijaz 45 (67); Bakhtarullah Atal 3/26 (6.1 overs)		Rahim Mangal 80* (78)

Khost Province won by 10 wickets
Khost Cricket Stadium, Khost
Umpires: Ahmed Shah Durrani and Farooq Khan
Player of the match: Asghar Atal (Khost Province)

- Khost Province won the toss and elected to field.
- The match was reduced to 45 overs per side due to rain.

2nd semi-final
20 August 2020
Scorecard

Kabul Province; 186/9 (22 overs)	v	Nangarhar Province; 70/2 (9 overs)
Darwish Rasooli 63 (32); Batin Shah 3/27 (5 overs)		Bahar Shinwari 38 (20); Parvez Amin 1/3 (1 over)

No result
Mis Ainak Cricket Ground, Khost
Umpires: Mahmood Kharoti and Bismillah Jan Shinwari

- Nangarhar Province won the toss and elected to field.
- The match was reduced to 22 overs per side due to rain.
- Nangarhar Province progressed to the final due to finishing top of their group.

22 August 2020
Scorecard

Nangarhar Province; 233 (47.5 overs)	v	Khost Province; 235/5 (40 overs)
Bahar Shinwari 62 (56); Asghar Atal 3/25 (7 overs)		Shahidullah 119* (131); Tariq Stanikzai 2/18 (4 overs)

Khost Province won by 5 wickets
Khost Cricket Stadium, Khost
Umpires: Farooq Khan and Bismillah Jan Shinwari
Player of the match: Shahidullah (Khost Province)

- Khost Province won the toss and elected to field.
