= 2024–25 Ahmad Shah Abdali 4-day Tournament =

Cricket tournament

- Tournament logo
- Dates: 16 September – 26 October 2024
- Administrator: Afghanistan Cricket Board (ACB)
- Cricket format: First-class
- Tournament format: Double round-robin
- Host: Afghanistan
- Champions: Pamir Legends (1st title)
- Participants: 4
- Matches: 13
- Player of the series: Ismat Alam (Pamir Legends)
- Most runs: Ismat Alam (Pamir Legends) (723)
- Most wickets: Yamin Ahmadzai (Maiwand Champions) (36); Fareed Ahmad (Pamir Legends) (36)

The 2024–25 Ahmad Shah Abdali 4-day Tournament was the seventh edition of the Ahmad Shah Abdali 4-day Tournament, a first-class cricket tournament in Afghanistan. It was being played from 16 September to 26 October 2024. The Afghanistan Cricket Board (ACB) confirmed the fixtures of the tournament on 8 September 2024. Maiwand Champions were the defending champion.

== Points table ==
Pos	Team	Pld	W	D	L	Pts	Qualification
1	Maiwand Champions	6	5	0	1	118	Advanced to the final
2	Pamir Legends	6	3	0	3	81	Advanced to the final
3	Mah-e-Par Stars	6	3	0	3	65	
4	Hindukush Strikers	6	1	0	5	32	

Source: ESPNcricinfo

== League stage ==
16–18 September 2024
Scorecard

Hindukush Strikers	v	Mah-e-Par Stars
196 (57.4 overs); Bahir Shah 42 (96); Mohammad Gul Alizai 5/47 (13.4 overs)		280 (73 overs); Ali Ahmad 55 (86); Ziaur Rahman 3/70 (20 overs)
141 (37.1 overs); Bahir Shah 43 (72); Amir Hamza 3/28 (10 overs)		58/0 (10.1 overs); Imran Mir 39* (35)

Mah-e-Par Stars won by 10 wickets
Ghazi Amanullah International Cricket Stadium, Amanullah
Umpires: Nasir Khan and Mahmood Kharoti
Player of the match: Mohammad Gul Alizai (Mah-e-Par Stars)

- Mah-e-Par Stars won the toss and elected to field.
- Arshaduddin Safi, Hizbullah Durrani (Hindukush Strikers) and Subhanullah Hotak (Mah-e-Par Stars) all made their first-class debuts.
- Mohammad Gul Alizai (Mah-e-Par Stars) took his maiden five-wicket haul in first-class cricket.
- Points: Mah-e-Par Stars 23, Hindukush Strikers 1

16–17 September 2024
Scorecard

Maiwand Champions	v	Pamir Legends
276 (56.1 overs); Abdullah Tarakhail 74 (62); Bashir Ahmad 5/70 (16 overs)		43 (14.5 overs); Zia-ur-Rehman 12 (26); Yamin Ahmadzai 8/13 (7.5 overs)
		159 (40.1 overs) (f/o); Sohail Khan Zurmati 40 (63); Arab Gul 3/31 (8 overs)

Maiwand Champions won by an innings and 74 runs
Najib Taraki Cricket Ground, Nangarhar
Umpires: Ihsanullah Danish and Muhammad Sabir
Player of the match: Yamin Ahmadzai (Maiwand Champions)

- Pamir Legends won the toss and elected to field.
- Jalat Khan, Jamshid Zadran, Rahimullah Zurmati (Maiwand Champions) Bashir Ahmad, Yama Arab, Usman Noori and Sohail Khan Zurmati (Pamir Legends) all made their first-class debuts.
- Bashir Ahmad took his maiden five-wicket haul in first-class cricket.
- Points: Maiwand Champions 24, Pamir Legends 2

22–25 September 2024
Scorecard

Maiwand Champions	v	Mah-e-Par Stars
492 (123.5 overs); Afsar Zazai 111 (180); Mohammad Ibrahim 4/72 (26 overs)		261 (79.2 overs); Imran Mir 69 (98); Yamin Ahmadzai 2/33 (17 overs)
222/6d (46.1 overs); Nasir Jamal 94 (90); Shamsurrahman 2/61 (12 overs)		176 (55.3 overs); Ijaz Ahmad 41* (104); Arab Gul 3/31 (11 overs)

Mah-e-Par Stars won by 278 runs
Ghazi Amanullah International Cricket Stadium, Amanullah
Umpires: Nasir Khan and Ajmal Shamolzi
Player of the match: Afsar Zazai (Maiwand Champions)

- Maiwand Champions won the toss and elected to bat.
- Points: Maiwand Champions 24, Mah-e-Par Stars 1

22–25 September 2024
Scorecard

Hindukush Strikers	v	Pamir Legends
376 (85.3 overs); Hizbullah Durrani 152 (152); Bashir Ahmad 5/38 (17 overs)		294 (103.5 overs); Islam Zazai 69 (122); Ziaur Rahman 5/63 (26.5 overs)
291 (66.5 overs); Arshaduddin Safi 120 (162); Khair Mohammad 6/57 (10.5 overs)		177 (50.5 overs); Usman Noori 56 (93); Khalil Gurbaz 5/33 (13 overs)

Hindukush Strikers won by 196 runs
Najib Taraki Cricket Ground, Nangarhar
Umpires: Ihsanullah Danish and Farooq Khan
Player of the match: Hizbullah Durrani (Hindukush Strikers)

- Pamir Legends won the toss and elected to field.
- Naseer Khan Maroofkhil, Lalbaz Sinzai (Hindukush Strikers) Abdullah Ahmadzai, Sami Mamozai and Khair Mohammad (Pamir Legends) all made their first-class debuts.
- Hizbullah Durrani and Arshaduddin Safi (Hindukush Strikers) both scored their maiden century in first-class cricket.
- Ziaur Rahman (Hindukush Strikers) took his maiden five-wicket haul in first-class cricket.
- Points: Hindukush Strikers 22, Pamir Legends 1

28–30 September 2024
Scorecard

Maiwand Champions	v	Hindukush Strikers
173 (63.4 overs); Nasir Jamal 96 (194); Ziaur Rahman 4/55 (17.4 overs)		146 (43.2 overs); Bahir Shah 43* (71); Yamin Ahmadzai 5/46 (18.2 overs)
158 (51.3 overs); Afsar Zazai 52 (80); Lalbaz Sinzai 5/84 (19 overs)		156 (37 overs); Bahir Shah 105* (107); Nasim Mangal 6/55 (12 overs)

Maiwand Champions won by 29 runs
Ghazi Amanullah International Cricket Stadium, Amanullah
Umpires: Ahmed Shah Durrani and Muhammad Sabir
Player of the match: Nasir Jamal (Maiwand Champions)

- Hindukush Strikers won the toss and elected to bat.
- Mohammad Younus (Maiwand Champions) made his first-class debut.
- Lalbaz Sinzai (Maiwand Champions) took his maiden five-wicket haul in first-class cricket.
- Points: Maiwand Champions 23, Hindukush Strikers 1

28 September–1 October 2024
Scorecard

Mah-e-Par Stars	v	Pamir Legends
191 (57.5 overs); Farmanullah 72* (114); Ismat Alam 4/20 (7.5 overs)		668/9d (166.3 overs); Usman Noori 339 (523); Kamil Kakar 3/118 (27 overs)
264 (11 overs); Shamsurrahman 67 (102); Fareed Ahmad 3/87 (14 overs)

Pamir Legends won by an innings and 213 runs
Najib Taraki Cricket Ground, Nangarhar
Umpires: Mahmood Kharoti and Ajmal Shamolzi
Player of the match: Usman Noori (Pamir Legends)

- Pamir Legends won the toss and elected to field.
- Usman Noori and Ismat Alam (Pamir Legends) both scored their maiden century in first-class cricket.
- Usman Noori's individual score was the highest in Ahmad Shah Abdali 4-day Tournament first-class history, surpassing Bahir Shah's 2017 record by 36 runs.
- Points: Pamir Legends 25, Mah-e-Par Stars 0

5–8 October 2024
Scorecard

Maiwand Champions	v	Pamir Legends
199 (49.3 overs); Jawid Ahmadzai 46 (60); Ismat Alam 6/46 (16 overs)		123 (54.5 overs); Shabir Noori 42 (113); Samiullah 4/33 (15 overs)
183 (46.1 overs); Shawkat Zaman 41 (59); Fareed Ahmad 5/76 (19 overs)		250 (86.1 overs); Rahmat Shah 71 (135); Yamin Ahmadzai 4/65 (31.2 overs)

Maiwand Champions won by 9 runs
Ghazi Amanullah International Cricket Stadium, Amanullah
Umpires: Ahmad Shah Pakteen and Bismillah Jan Shinwari
Player of the match: Yamin Ahmadzai (Maiwand Champions)

- Pamir Legends won the toss and elected to field.
- Samiullah (Maiwand Champions) made his first-class debut.
- Ismat Alam (Pamir Legends) took his maiden five-wicket haul in first-class cricket.
- Points: Maiwand Champions 22, Pamir Legends 2

5–8 October 2024
Scorecard

Mah-e-Par Stars	v	Hindukush Strikers
355 (89.2 overs); Hashmatullah Shahidi 95 (142); Abdul Baqi 3/73 (19 overs)		362 (65.5 overs); Abdul Malik 164 (170); Zahir Khan 5/128 (18.5 overs)
265 (93 overs); Ijaz Ahmad 90* (219); Mohammad Tahir 4/61 (22 overs)		219 (50.1 overs); Bahir Shah 79 (127); Amir Hamza 4/39 (14 overs)

Mah-e-Par Stars won by 39 runs
Najib Taraki Cricket Ground, Nangarhar
Umpires: Farooq Khan and Izatullah Safi
Player of the match: Zahir Khan (Mah-e-Par Stars)

- Mah-e-Par Stars won the toss and elected to bat.
- Ikramullah Momand (Mah-e-Par Stars) made his first-class debut.
- Points: Mah-e-Par Stars 17, Hindukush Strikers 8

10–12 October 2024
Scorecard

Pamir Legends	v	Mah-e-Par Stars
667/9d (144 overs); Ismat Alam 263* (304); Mohammad Ibrahim 3/90 (25 overs)		178 (40 overs); Riaz Hassan 56 (52); Fareed Ahmad 5/84 (18 overs)
		213 (44.5 overs) (f/o); Ali Ahmad 49 (58); Yama Arab 5/90 (20 overs)

Pamir Legends won by an innings and 276 runs
Ghazi Amanullah International Cricket Stadium, Amanullah
Umpires: Farooq Khan and Ajmal Shamolzi
Player of the match: Ismat Alam (Pamir Legends)

- Mah-e-Par Stars won the toss and elected to field.
- Haroon Khan (Mah-e-Par Stars) made his first-class debut.
- Points: Pamir Legends 26, Mah-e-Par Stars 0

10–12 October 2024
Scorecard

Maiwand Champions	v	Hindukush Strikers
396/9d (112 overs); Nasir Jamal 137 (198); Aftab Alam 3/59 (17 overs)		174 (46 overs); Bahir Shah 33 (42); Mohammadullah 4/44 (17 overs)
271/9d (65.2 overs); Jalat Khan 85 (97); Khalil Gurbaz 6/84 (24 overs)		150 (32 overs); Bahir Shah 56 (76); Mohammad Younus 4/71 (9 overs)

Maiwand Champions won by 343 runs
Najib Taraki Cricket Ground, Nangarhar
Umpires: Mahmood Kharoti and Muhammad Sabir
Player of the match: Afsar Zazai (Maiwand Champions)

- Maiwand Champions won the toss and elected to bat.
- Afsar Zazai (Maiwand Champions) scored his 2,000th run in first-class cricket.
- Points: Maiwand Champions 24, Hindukush Strikers 0

16–17 October 2024
Scorecard

Pamir Legends	v	Hindukush Strikers
355 (92.1 overs); Ismat Alam 154 (195); Ziaur Rahman 5/62 (20 overs)		68 (14.5 overs); Mohibullah Zurmati 22* (26); Fareed Ahmad 4/32 (7.5 overs)
		193 (32.3 overs) (f/o); Rahmanullah 47 (50); Bashir Ahmad 5/58 (11 overs)

Pamir Legends won by an innings and 94 runs
Ghazi Amanullah International Cricket Stadium, Amanullah
Umpires: Ahmed Shah Durrani and Bismillah Jan Shinwari
Player of the match: Ismat Alam (Pamir Legends)

- Pamir Legends won the toss and elected to bat.
- Points: Pamir Legends 25, Hindukush Strikers 0

16–17 October 2024
Scorecard

Maiwand Champions	v	Mah-e-Par Stars
104 (25.2 overs); Nasim Mangal 20* (22); Mohammad Ibrahim 5/30 (8 overs)		253 (80 overs); Ijaz Ahmad 65 (94); Arab Gul 5/66 (23)
214 (47 overs); Mohammad Younus 62 (94); Zahir Shehzad 6/45 (13 overs)		69/3 (17.1 overs); Allah Noor 30* (50); Afsar Zazai 1/6 (1.1 overs)

Mah-e-Par Stars won by 7 wickets
Najib Taraki Cricket Ground, Nangarhar
Umpires: Ahmad Shah Pakteen and Izatullah Safi
Player of the match: Mohammad Ibrahim (Mah-e-Par Stars)

- Maiwand Champions won the toss and elected to bat.
- Points: Mah-e-Par Stars 24, Maiwand Champions 1

== Final ==
21–25 October 2024
Scorecard

Pamir Legends	v	Maiwand Champions
270 (79.4 overs); Rahmat Shah 83 (124); Arab Gul 4/64 (20.4 overs)		218 (64.4 overs); Afsar Zazai 71 (122); Fareed Ahmad 5/69 (24.4 overs)
304 (96.3 overs); Ismat Alam 111 (186); Yamin Ahmadzai 6/80 (34.3 overs)		245 (69.2 overs); Sediqullah Pacha 64 (95); Fareed Ahmad 5/123 (29.5 overs)

Pamir Legends won by 111 runs
Ghazi Amanullah International Cricket Stadium, Amanullah
Umpires: Mahmood Kharoti and Izatullah Safi
Player of the match: Fareed Ahmad (Pamir Legends)

- Pamir Legends won the toss and elected to bat.
