= Afghanistan A cricket team in Sri Lanka in 2024 =

International cricket tour

| | Sri Lanka A | Afghanistan A |
- Dates: 28 April – 14 May 2024
| Captains | Sahan Arachchige (Note: Nishan Madushka captained Sri Lanka A in the 3rd, 4th and 5th unofficial ODI.) (List A); Pasindu Sooriyabandara (First-class) | Ikram Alikhil (Note: Shahidullah captained Afghanistan A in the 5th unofficial ODI.)(List A); Ihsanullah (First-class) |

FC series
- Result: Sri Lanka A won the 1-match series 1–0
| Most runs | Sonal Dinusha (145) | Imran Mir (115) |
| Most wickets | Wanuja Sahan (6); Nisala Tharaka (6) | Zia-ur-Rehman (6) |

LA series
- Result: Sri Lanka A won the 5-match series 3–2
| Most runs | Nishan Madushka (227) | Riaz Hassan (289) |
| Most wickets | Mohamed Shiraz (8) | Bilal Sami (9) |

The Afghanistan A cricket team toured Sri Lanka in April and May 2024 to play the Sri Lanka A cricket team. The tour consist of five List A and one first-class matches. In February 2024, the Afghanistan Cricket Board (ACB) confirmed the dates for the tour.

In March 2024, Sri Lanka Cricket (SLC) announced the full tour itinerary, with the one-day and four-day matches taking place at Hambantota and Colombo respectively. Afghanistan A arrived in Sri Lanka on 25 April 2024.

== Squads ==
| Afghanistan A | | Sri Lanka A | |
| First-class | List A | First-class | List A |
|---|---|---|---|
| Ihsanullah (c); Ikram Alikhil; Abdul Malik; Imran Mir; Bahir Shah; Rahmanullah; Ijaz Ahmad Mehri; Abdul Hadi; Mohammad Tahir; Abdullah Tarakhil; Khalil Gurbaz; Zia-ur-Rehman; Ibrahim Abdulrahimzai; Naveed Zadran; Naseem Mangal; Sayed Shirzad | Ikram Alikhil (c); Riaz Hassan; Abdul Malik; Zubaid Akbari; Shahid Kamal; Bilal Ahmad; Darwish Rasooli; Mohammad Ishaq; Nangialai Kharoti; Farmanullah Safi; Qais Ahmad; Zia-ur-Rehman; Saleem Safi; Abdul Rahman; Bilal Sami | Pasindu Sooriyabandara (c); Lahiru Udara; Oshada Fernando; Nipun Karunanayake; Nuwanidu Fernando; Pavan Rathnayake; Ahan Wickramasinghe; Vishad Randika; Sonal Dinusha; Chamika Gunasekara; Nisala Tharaka; Wanuja Sahan; Nishan Peiris; Ashian Daniel; Milan Rathnayake | Sahan Arachchige (c); Nuwanidu Fernando (vc); Lahiru Udara; Nishan Madushka; Kamil Mishara; Pavan Rathnayake; Chamika Karunaratne; Dushan Hemantha; Chamika Gunasekera; Mohamed Shiraz; Wanuja Sahan; Minod Bhanuka; Ahan Wickramasinghe; Nimesh Vimukthi |

== Unofficial ODI series ==
=== 1st unofficial ODI ===
28 April 2024
Scorecard

| Sri Lanka A 304/8 (50 overs) | v | Afghanistan A 277/7 (48 overs) |
| Nuwanidu Fernando 83 (67); Bilal Sami 4/51 (10 overs) | | Riaz Hassan 100 (115); Sahan Arachchige 3/40 (10 overs) |

Sri Lanka A won by 8 runs (DLS method)
Mahinda Rajapaksa International Cricket Stadium, Hambantota
Umpires: Chandrika Amarasinghe (SL) and Nilan De Silva (SL)

- Afghanistan A won the toss and elected to field.
- Afghanistan A were set a revised target of 286 runs from 48 overs due to rain.

=== 2nd unofficial ODI ===
30 April 2024
Scorecard

| Afghanistan A 121 (27.2 overs) | v | Sri Lanka A 104/2 (15.2 overs) |
| Qais Ahmad 46 (49); Mohamed Shiraz 2/17 (7 overs) | | Kamil Mishara 45* (45); Qais Ahmad 1/22 (3.2 overs) |

Sri Lanka won by 8 wickets (DLS method)
Mahinda Rajapaksa International Cricket Stadium, Hambantota
Umpires: Chandrika Amarasinghe (SL) and Hemantha Boteju (SL)

- Afghanistan A won the toss and elected to bat.
- The match was reduced to 30 overs per side due to rain.
- Sri Lanka A were set a revised target of 101 runs from 30 overs due to rain.

=== 3rd unofficial ODI ===
3 May 2024
Scorecard

| Afghanistan A 185 (41.2 overs) | v | Sri Lanka A 186/6 (37.3 overs) |
| Zia-ur-Rehman 36 (47); Mohamed Shiraz 3/31 (6 overs) | | Pasindu Sooriyabandara 84* (109); Mohammad Saleem 3/32 (10 overs) |

Sri Lanka A won by 4 wickets
Mahinda Rajapaksa International Cricket Stadium, Hambantota
Umpires: Sanjeewa Fernando (SL) and Shantha Fonseka (SL)

- Afghanistan A won the toss and elected to bat.

=== 4th unofficial ODI ===
5 May 2024
Scorecard

| Sri Lanka A 275/7 (50 overs) | v | Afghanistan A 276/6 (49.4 overs) |
| Nishan Madushka 115 (127); Bilal Sami 3/54 (10 overs) | | Riaz Hassan 106 (128); Dushan Hemantha 2/39 (6 overs) |

Afghanistan A won by 4 wickets
Mahinda Rajapaksa International Cricket Stadium, Hambantota
Umpires: Sanjeewa Fernando (SL) and Pradeep Udawatta (SL)

- Afghanistan A won the toss and elected to field.

=== 5th unofficial ODI ===
7 May 2024
Scorecard

| Sri Lanka A 197 (43 overs) | v | Afghanistan A 198/5 (45 overs) |
| Pasindu Sooriyabandara 70 (92); Naveed Zadran 4/45 (8 overs) | | Riaz Hassan 74* (117); Dushan Hemantha 2/46 (8 overs) |

Afghanistan A won by 5 wickets
Mahinda Rajapaksa International Cricket Stadium, Hambantota
Umpires: Sanjeewa Fernando (SL) and Pradeep Udawatta (SL)

- Afghanistan A won the toss and elected to field.

== Only unofficial Test ==
11–14 May 2024
Scorecard

| Sri Lanka A | v | Afghanistan A |
| 435 (101.3 overs); Sonal Dinusha 145 (193); Zia-ur-Rehman 3/127 (31.3 overs) | | 198 (67.5 overs); Imran Mir 62 (114); Sonal Dinusha 5/58 (17.5 overs) |
| | | 211 (62.3 overs) (f/o); Imran Mir (113); Nisala Tharaka 6/42 (11.3 overs) |

Sri Lanka A won by innings and 26 runs
Paikiasothy Saravanamuttu Stadium, Colombo
Umpires: Ravindra Kottahachchi (SL) and Chamara de Soysa (SL)

- Sri Lanka A won the toss and elected to bat.
- Bad light prevented any further play after 87 overs in day 1.
- Only 20.4 overs of play was possible on day 2 due to rain and wet outfield.
