= Afghan cricket team in Zimbabwe in 2025–26 =

International cricket tour

	Zimbabwe	Afghanistan
- Dates: 20 October – 2 November 2025
Captains	Craig Ervine (Test); Sikandar Raza (T20Is)	Hashmatullah Shahidi (Test); Rashid Khan (Note: Ibrahim Zadran captained Afghanistan in the 3rd T20I.) (T20Is)

Test series
- Result: Zimbabwe won the 1-match series 1–0
Most runs	Ben Curran (121)	Ibrahim Zadran (61)
Most wickets	Blessing Muzarabani (6)	Ziaur Rahman (7)

Twenty20 International series
- Results: Afghanistan won the 3-match series 3–0
Most runs	Sikandar Raza (89)	Ibrahim Zadran (169)
Most wickets	Brad Evans (5)	Abdullah Ahmadzai (7); Mujeeb Ur Rahman (7)
- Player of the series: Ibrahim Zadran (Afg)

The Afghanistan cricket team toured Zimbabwe in October and November 2025 to play the Zimbabwe cricket team. The tour consisted of one-off Test and three Twenty20 International (T20I) matches. In October 2025, the Zimbabwe Cricket (ZC) confirmed the fixtures for the tour. All the matches were played at the Harare Sports Club.

== Squads ==
Zimbabwe		Afghanistan	
Test	T20Is	Test	T20Is
Craig Ervine (c); Brian Bennett; Tanaka Chivanga; Ben Curran; Brad Evans; Roy Kaia; Tanunurwa Makoni; Wellington Masakadza; Tinotenda Maposa; Blessing Muzarabani; Antum Naqvi; Richard Ngarava; Sikandar Raza; Tafadzwa Tsiga (wk); Brendan Taylor (wk); Nick Welch	Sikandar Raza (c); Brian Bennett; Ryan Burl; Graeme Cremer; Brad Evans; Clive Madande (wk); Tinotenda Maposa; Tadiwanashe Marumani (wk); Wellington Masakadza; Tony Munyonga; Tashinga Musekiwa; Blessing Muzarabani; Dion Myers; Richard Ngarava; Brendan Taylor (wk)	Hashmatullah Shahidi (c); Bashir Ahmad; Yamin Ahmadzai; Ismat Alam; Ikram Alikhil (wk); Sharafuddin Ashraf; Khalil Gurbaz; Rahmanullah Gurbaz; Abdul Malik; Zia-ur-Rehman; Ziaur Rahman; Bahir Shah; Shahidullah; Ibrahim Zadran; Afsar Zazai (wk)	Rashid Khan (c); Ibrahim Zadran (vc); Bashir Ahmad; Fareed Ahmad; Noor Ahmad; Abdullah Ahmadzai; Ijaz Ahmad Ahmadzai; Sharafuddin Ashraf; Sediqullah Atal; Rahmanullah Gurbaz (wk); Mohammad Nabi; Azmatullah Omarzai; Mujeeb Ur Rahman; Darwish Rasooli; Shahidullah

Afghanistan named Sediqullah Atal, Mohammad Ibrahim and Shams Ur Rahman as reserves for the Test match while Faridoon Dawoodzai and Allah Mohammad Ghazanfar were named as reserves for the T20I series.

== Only Test ==
20–22 October 2025
Scorecard

Afghanistan	v	Zimbabwe
127 (32.3 overs); Rahmanullah Gurbaz 37 (37); Brad Evans 5/22 (9.3 overs)		359 (103 overs); Ben Curran 121 (256); Ziaur Rahman 7/97 (32 overs)
159 (43 overs); Ibrahim Zadran 42 (59); Richard Ngarava 5/37 (13 overs)

Zimbabwe won by an innings and 73 runs
Harare Sports Club, Harare
Umpires: Adrian Holdstock (SA) and Nitin Menon (Ind)
Player of the match: Ben Curran (Zim)

- Zimbabwe won the toss and elected to field.
- Khalil Gurbaz, Sharafuddin Ashraf and Ziaur Rahman (Afg) all made their Test debuts.
- Brad Evans (Zim) took his maiden five-wicket haul in Tests.
- Ben Curran (Zim) scored his maiden century in Tests.
- Ziaur Rahman (Afg) took his maiden five-wicket haul in Tests.
- Richard Ngarava (Zim) took his maiden five-wicket haul in Tests.
- This was Zimbabwe's first Test win at home after 12 years.

== T20I series ==
=== 1st T20I ===
29 October 2025
13:30
Scorecard

Afghanistan; 180/6 (20 overs)	v	Zimbabwe; 127 (16.1 overs)
Ibrahim Zadran 52 (33); Sikandar Raza 3/20 (4 overs)		Tinotenda Maposa 32 (15); Mujeeb Ur Rahman 4/20 (3 overs)

Afghanistan won by 53 runs
Harare Sports Club, Harare
Umpires: Iknow Chabi (Zim) and Langton Rusere (Zim)
Player of the match: Azmatullah Omarzai (Afg)

- Afghanistan won the toss and elected to bat.

=== 2nd T20I ===
31 October 2025
13:30
Scorecard

Zimbabwe; 125 (19.3 overs)	v	Afghanistan; 129/3 (18 overs)
Sikandar Raza 37 (32); Rashid Khan 3/9 (3 overs)		Ibrahim Zadran 57* (51); Brad Evans 2/21 (3 overs)

Afghanistan won by 7 wickets
Harare Sports Club, Harare
Umpires: Forster Mutizwa (Zim) and Percival Sizara (Zim)
Player of the match: Rashid Khan (Afg)

- Zimbabwe won the toss and elected to bat.

=== 3rd T20I ===
2 November 2025
13:30
Scorecard

Afghanistan; 210/3 (20 overs)	v	Zimbabwe; 201 (20 overs)
Rahmanullah Gurbaz 92 (48); Brad Evans 2/33 (4 overs)		Sikandar Raza 51 (29); Abdullah Ahmadzai 3/42 (4 overs)

Afghanistan won by 9 runs
Harare Sports Club, Harare
Umpires: Langton Rusere (Zim) and Percival Sizara (Zim)
Player of the match: Rahmanullah Gurbaz (Afg)

- Afghanistan won the toss and elected to bat.
