= 2017–18 Ahmad Shah Abdali 4-day Tournament =

Cricket tournament

- Dates: 20 October 2017 – 23 December 2017
- Administrator: Afghanistan Cricket Board (ACB)
- Cricket format: First-class
- Tournament format(s): Round-robin and final
- Host: Afghanistan
- Champions: Band-e-Amir Region (1st title)
- Participants: 5
- Matches: 21
- Most runs: Bahir Shah (1,096)
- Most wickets: Zia-ur-Rehman (55); Waqar Salamkheil (55); Zahir Shehzad (55)

The 2017–18 Ahmad Shah Abdali 4-day Tournament was an edition of the Ahmad Shah Abdali 4-day Tournament, a cricket tournament in Afghanistan. It was the first edition of the competition to be played with first-class status. The tournament started on 20 October 2017 and finished on 23 December 2017. Five regional teams competed in a double round-robin tournament with the top two teams in the group progressing to the final.

Speen Ghar Region finished first in the group stage and faced Band-e-Amir Region in the final. Band-e-Amir Region won the tournament, beating Speen Ghar Region by 537 runs in the final.

== Squads ==
| Amo Region | Band-e-Amir Region | Boost Region | Mis Ainak Region | Speen Ghar Region |
|---|---|---|---|---|
| Adbullah Mazari; Juma Gul; Zahid Zakhail; Yahya Khan; Haji Murad Muradi; Farhan Zakhil; Asadullah Matani; Khalid Khan; Noorullah; Abdul Malik; Jamshid Khan; Samiullah; Ihsanullah; Javed Zadran; Shir Shirzai | Imran Janat; Hazrat Zazai; Zia ul Haq; Noor ul Haq; Younis Ahmadzai; Mohammad Sardar; Murtaza; Shakirullah; Farmanullah; Nasrat Ullah Qurishi; Rokhan Barakzai; Nijat Masood; Abdullah Adil; Zahir Khan; Asif Musazai | Munir Ahmad; Sami Agha; Khaibar Omar; Bahar Shinwari; Dawlat Khan; Mohammad Ibrahim; Karim Sadiq; Nazir Ahmad; Mohammad Alam; Abdul Baqi; Batin Shah; Ihsanullah; Mohammad Nasir; Dastagir Khan; Shah Zaib | Ghamai Zadran; Fazal Zazai; Rahim Mangal; Rahmat Sahak; Imran; Ziaulhaq; Akmal Orya; Sadam Mangal; Rashid Zadran (wk); Nawaz Khan; Kabir Alikhail; Fazal Niazai; Bakhtarullah Atal; Zia Akbar; Nasir Totakhil | Shawkat Zaman; Basir Mahboob; Nasir Omar; Mutabar Khan; Hamayun Omar; Arif Khan; Tahir Adil; Waheedullah Shafaq; Qasim Oryakhail; Muslim Musa; Zahir Shehzad; Fitratullah Khawari; Ibrahim Abdurahimzai; Khairullah; Zamir Khan |

== Points table ==
| Team | Pld | W | L | D | NR | Pts |
|---|---|---|---|---|---|---|
| Speen Ghar Region | 8 | 4 | 2 | 2 | 0 | 100 |
| Band-e-Amir Region | 8 | 3 | 2 | 3 | 0 | 99 |
| Mis Ainak Region | 8 | 2 | 1 | 5 | 0 | 87 |
| Amo Region | 8 | 2 | 2 | 4 | 0 | 62 |
| Boost Region | 8 | 1 | 5 | 2 | 0 | 52 |

Team qualified for the Final

== Fixtures ==
=== Round 1 ===
20–23 October 2017
Scorecard

| Mis Ainak Region | v | Band-e-Amir Region |
| 167 (37.4 overs); Rahmatullah Sahaq 76 (73); Nijat Masood 6/55 (12 overs) | | 263 (72.2 overs); Zia-ul-Haq 104 (166); Zia-ur-Rehman 4/60 (18.2 overs) |
| 581 (132.5 overs); Rahmatullah Sahaq 176* (185); Noor-ul-Haq 4/105 (18.5 overs) | | 223 (73.1 overs); Younas Ahmadzai 48 (52); Zia-ur-Rehman 3/56 (27 overs) |

Mis Ainak Region won by 262 runs
Kabul International Cricket Stadium, Kabul
Umpires: Bismillah Jan Shinwari and Izatullah Safi
Player of the match: Rahmatullah Sahaq (Mis Ainak Region)

- Band-e-Amir Region won the toss and elected to field.
- Fazal Zazai, Rahim Mangal, Imran Mir, Ghamai Zadran, Ziaulhaq, Rashid Zadran, Nasir Totakhil, Nawaz Khan, Zia-ur-Rehman, Kabir Alikhail (Mis Ainak Region), Imran Janat, Hazratullah Zazai, Zia-ul-Haq, Younas Ahmadzai, Shakirullah, Mohammad Sardar, Sayed Nasratullah, Rokhan Barakzai and Nijat Masood (Band-e-Amir Region) all made their first-class debuts.

20–23 October 2017
Scorecard

| Speen Ghar Region | v | Amo Region |
| 635/5d (173 overs); Bahir Shah 256* (417); Abdullah Mazari 2/177 (51 overs) | | 284 (90.5 overs); Haji Murad Muradi 102 (154); Mohammad Ibrahim 4/62 (21.5 overs) |
| | | 305 (106.2 overs) (f/o); Haji Murad Muradi 142 (178); Zahir Shehzad 5/119 (33.2 overs) |

Speen Ghar Region won by an innings and 46 runs
Ghazi Amanullah International Cricket Stadium, Ghazi Amanullah Town
Umpires: Ahmed Shah Pakteen and Mahmood Kharoti
Player of the match: Bahir Shah (Speen Ghar Region)

- Speen Ghar Region won the toss and elected to bat.
- Hamayun Omar, Nasir Khan, Bahir Shah, Tahir Khan, Shawkat Zaman, Waheedullah Shafaq, Muslim Musa, Qasim Oryakhail, Zahir Shehzad, Fitratullah Khawari, Mohammad Ibrahim (Speen Ghar Region), Zahid Zakhail, Juma Gul, Shir Shirzai, Farhan Zakhil, Yahya Khan, Haji Murad Muradi, Asadullah Matani, Jamshid Khan, Samiullah, Ihsanullah Mandozai (Amo Region) all made their first-class debuts.
- Bahir Shah (Speen Ghar Region) scored the second-highest total on debut in a first-class match.

=== Round 2 ===
26–29 October 2017
Scorecard

| Boost Region | v | Mis Ainak Region |
| 281 (103.5 overs); Karim Sadiq 114 (220); Zia-ur-Rehman 5/67 (41 overs) | | 247 (65.5 overs); Rahmatullah Sahaq 54* (87); Mohammad Alam 4/64 (25 overs) |
| 263 (67.1 overs); Sami Agha 75 (71); Nasir Totakhil 5/48 (17 overs) | | 224 (68.4 overs); Rahim Mangal 68 (124); Mohammad Alam 7/76 (30.4 overs) |

Boost Region won by 73 runs
Kabul International Cricket Stadium, Kabul
Umpires: Farooq Khan and Izatullah Safi
Player of the match: Mohammad Alam (Boost Region)

- Boost Region won the toss and elected to bat.
- Bahar Shinwari, Sami Agha, Munir Ahmad, Khaibar Omar, Mohammad Ibrahim, Dilawar Khan, Batin Shah, Mohammad Alam, Abdul Baqi, Mohammad Nasir (Boost Region), Sadam Mangal and Bakhtarullah Atal (Mis Ainak Region) all made their first-class debuts.

26–29 October 2017
Scorecard

| Amo Region | v | Speen Ghar Region |
| 196 (54.5 overs); Zahid Zakhail 70 (123); Tahir Khan 3/21 (7 overs) | | 282 (91.5 overs); Waheedullah Shafaq 79 (117); Abdullah Mazari 4/100 (40 overs) |
| 221 (50.5 overs); Haji Murad Muradi 74 (96); Zahir Shehzad 5/57 (15 overs) | | 137/2 (55.1 overs); Nasir Khan 71* (169); Abdullah Mazari 1/22 (14.1 overs) |

Speen Ghar Region won by 8 wickets
Ghazi Amanullah International Cricket Stadium, Ghazi Amanullah Town
Umpires: Ahmed Shah Durrani and Mohammad Sabir
Player of the match: Muslim Musa (Speen Ghar Region)

- Amo Region won the toss and elected to bat.
- Khairullah (Speen Ghar Region), Abdul Malik, Noorullah and Javed Zadran (Amo Region) all made their first-class debuts.

=== Round 3 ===
1–4 November 2017
Scorecard

| Speen Ghar Region | v | Boost Region |
| 357 (114 overs); Bahir Shah 111 (229); Abdul Baqi 4/74 (26 overs) | | 209 (70.2 overs); Bahar Shinwari 63 (128); Zahir Shehzad 4/71 (24 overs) |
| 262 (74.4 overs); Bahir Shah 116 (161); Abdul Baqi 5/99 (27 overs) | | 228 (87.3 overs); Bahar Shinwari 108 (245); Zahir Shehzad 5/80 (29 overs) |

Speen Ghar Region won by 182 runs
Khost Cricket Stadium, Khost
Umpires: Ajmal Shamolzi and Bismillah Jan Shinwari
Player of the match: Bahir Shah (Speen-Ghar Region)

- Speen Ghar Region won the toss and elected to bat.
- Ahsanullah (Boost Region), Said Mutabar and Zamir Khan (Speen Ghar Region) all made their first-class debuts.

1–4 November 2017
Scorecard

| Band-e-Amir Region | v | Amo Region |
| 198 (72.3 overs); Shakirullah 45 (135); Samiullah 3/35 (13.3 overs) | | 172 (50.1 overs); Haji Murad Muradi 38 (66); Rokhan Barakzai 3/30 (10 overs) |
| 278 (60.3 overs); Hazratullah Zazai 86 (79); Abdullah Mazari 4/72 (25 overs) | | 305/8 (81.1 overs); Juma Gul 95 (84); Rokhan Barakzai 3/77 (30.1 overs) |

Amo Region won by 2 wickets
Ghazi Amanullah International Cricket Stadium, Ghazi Amanullah Town
Umpires: Mahmood Kharoti and Mohammad Sabir
Player of the match: Juma Gul (Amo Region)

- Band-e-Amir Region won the toss and elected to bat.
- Farmanullah, Mohammad Zahir (Band-e-Amir Region) and Khalid Zahedi (Amo Region) all made their first-class debuts.

=== Round 4 ===
7–10 November 2017
Scorecard

| Boost Region | v | Speen Ghar Region |
| 355 (104.2 overs); Khaibar Omar 110 (193); Zamir Khan 5/81 (26.2 overs) | | 648/7d (168 overs); Bahir Shah 303* (465); Abdul Baqi 3/193 (53 overs) |
| 155 (45.3 overs); Mohammad Ibrahim 51 (82); Zamir Khan 5/46 (13 overs) |

Speen Ghar Region won by an innings and 138 runs
Khost Cricket Stadium, Khost
Umpires: Farooq Khan and Izatullah Safi
Player of the match: Bahir Shah (Speen Ghar Region)

- Speen Ghar Region won the toss and elected to field.
- Arif Khan (Speen Ghar Region), Shah Zaib, Nazir Ahmad and Dastagir Khan (Boost Region) all made their first-class debuts.
- Bahir Shah (Speen Ghar Region) became the second-youngest player, after Javed Miandad, to score a triple century in first-class cricket.

7–10 November 2017
Scorecard

| Mis Ainak Region | v | Band-e-Amir Region |
| 279 (75.3 overs); Rahim Mangal 115 (231); Sayed Nasratullah 4/89 (28.3 overs) | | 277 (115.5 overs); Asif Musazai 68 (161); Fazal Niazai 4/88 (32.5 overs) |
| 402/9d (92 overs); Ziaulhaq 141 (194); Rokhan Barakzai 4/70 (29 overs) | | 197/7 (75 overs); Mohammad Sardar 65* (88); Nawaz Khan 3/30 (16 overs) |

Match drawn
Ghazi Amanullah International Cricket Stadium, Ghazi Amanullah Town
Umpires: Abdullah and Ahmed Shah Durrani
Player of the match: Zia-ur-Rehman (Mis Ainak Region)

- Band-e-Amir Region won the toss and elected to field.
- Haqmal Arya (Mis Ainak Region) and Asif Musazai (Band-e-Amir Region) both made their first-class debuts.

=== Round 5 ===
13–16 November 2017
Scorecard

| Amo Region | v | Boost Region |
| 83 (26.5 overs); Abdullah Mazari 30 (55); Gulbadin Naib 5/29 (10 overs) | | 501/6 (124 overs); Munir Ahmad 174* (274); Jamshid Khan 4/96 (26 overs) |

Match drawn
Khost Cricket Stadium, Khost
Umpires: Ajmal Shamolzi and Bismillah Jan Shinwari
Player of the match: Gulbadin Naib (Boost Region)

- Boost Region won the toss and elected to field.
- No play was possible on days 3 and 4 due to rain.
- Tamim Surkhorodi, Mohammad Wasim Mandozai and Fazalhaq Farooqi (Amo Region) all made their first-class debuts.

13–16 November 2017
Scorecard

| Speen Ghar Region | v | Mis Ainak Region |
| 213 (63.3 overs); Bahir Shah 69 (88); Aftab Alam 6/38 (17 overs) | | 276 (89 overs); Ghamai Zadran 91 (181); Zahir Shehzad 6/106 (31 overs) |
| 30/2 (11 overs); Zamir Khan 10* (10); Zia-ur-Rehman 2/4 (5 overs) |

Match drawn
Ghazi Amanullah International Cricket Stadium, Ghazi Amanullah Town
Umpires: Abdullah and Mahmood Kharoti
Player of the match: Aftab Alam (Mis Ainak Region) and Zahir Shehzad (Speen Ghar Region)

- Mis Ainak Region won the toss and elected to field.
- No play was possible on days 3 and 4 due to rain.
- Shafiqullah (Speen Ghar Region) and Aftab Alam (Mis Ainak Region) both made their first-class debuts.

=== Round 6 ===
19–22 November 2017
Scorecard

| Boost Region | v | Band-e-Amir Region |
| 260 (85.2 overs); Munir Ahmad 46 (74); Waqar Salamkheil 4/102 (28 overs) | | 205 (48.5 overs); Hazratullah Zazai 38 (39); Sayed Shirzad 5/36 (11 overs) |
| 404/8d (112.1 overs); Munir Ahmad 100* (170); Waqar Salamkheil 5/162 (44.2 overs) | | 430/7 (98 overs); Noor-ul-Haq 116 (162); Sayed Shirzad 5/113 (29 overs) |

Match drawn
Khost Cricket Stadium, Khost
Umpires: Ahmed Shah Durrani and Mehmood Kharotai
Player of the match: Sayed Shirzad (Boost Region)

- Band-e-Amir Region won the toss and elected to field.
- Waqar Salamkheil and Usman Ghani (Band-e-Amir Region) both made their first-class debuts.

19–22 November 2017
Scorecard

| Mis Ainak Region | v | Speen Ghar Region |
| 361 (110.1 overs); Imran Mir 170 (236); Muslim Musa 3/75 (18.1 overs) | | 366 (131 overs); Nasir Khan 90 (219); Nawaz Khan 4/63 (20 overs) |
| 287/9d (71 overs); Shahidullah 63 (73); Zamir Khan 2/56 (13 overs) | | 242/6 (50 overs); Said Mutabar 73 (111); Shahidullah 3/26 (9 overs) |

Match drawn
Ghazi Amanullah International Cricket Stadium, Ghazi Amanullah Town
Umpires: Izatullah Safi and Tasal Shinwari
Player of the match: Imran Mir (Mis Ainak Region) and Said Mutabar (Speen Ghar Region)

- Speen Ghar Region won the toss and elected to field.
- Shahidullah (Mis Ainak Region) made his first-class debut.

=== Round 7 ===
25–28 November 2017
Scorecard

| Amo Region | v | Band-e-Amir Region |
| 459 (130.3 overs); Khalid Zahedi 135 (244); Waqar Salamkheil 5/140 (35.3 overs) | | 609 (131.5 overs); Zia-ul-Haq 137 (201); Abdullah Mazari 5/143 (31.5 overs) |
| 266 (75.1 overs); Tamim Surkhorodi 63 (68); Waqar Salamkheil 4/68 (24.1 overs) | | 48/5 (11 overs); Zia-ul-Haq 12* (25); Abdullah Mazari 3/19 (6 overs) |

Match drawn
Khost Cricket Stadium, Khost
Umpires: Irshad Omari and Mahmood Kharoti
Player of the match: Karim Janat (Band-e-Amir Region)

- Band-e-Amir Region won the toss and elected to field.
- Attaullah, Zohaib Ahmadzai (Amo Region) and Wali Bahadur (Band-e-Amir Region) all made their first-class debuts.

25–28 November 2017
Scorecard

| Boost Region | v | Mis Ainak Region |
| 63 (35.5 overs); Bahar Shinwari 18 (44); Zia-ur-Rehman 6/11 (11.5 overs) | | 287 (68.2 overs); Rahmatullah Sahaq 58 (72); Mohammad Alam 4/74 (25 overs) |
| 168 (58.3 overs); Bahar Shinwari 61 (112); Zia-ur-Rehman 6/62 (23 overs) |

Mis Ainak Region won by an innings and 56 runs
Ghazi Amanullah International Cricket Stadium, Ghazi Amanullah Town
Umpires: Ajmal Shamolzi and Bismillah Jan Shinwari
Player of the match: Zia-ur-Rehman (Mis Ainak Region)

- Mis Ainak Region won the toss and elected to field.
- Mohammad Kabir (Boost Region), Ihsanullah Ihsan and Ajmal Khan (Mis Ainak Region) all made their first-class debuts.

=== Round 8 ===
1–4 December 2017
Scorecard

| Amo Region | v | Mis Ainak Region |
| 500 (128 overs); Mohibullah Oryakhel 149 (225); Zia-ur-Rehman 5/124 (48 overs) | | 393 (84.3 overs); Imran Mir 160 (209); Abdullah Mazari 5/116 (33 overs) |
| 277 (66.3 overs); Najeeb Tarakai 153 (134); Nawaz Khan 5/57 (14.3 overs) | | 340/8 (91 overs); Imran Mir 96 (144); Jamshid Khan 3/73 (18 overs) |

Match drawn
Khost Cricket Stadium, Khost
Umpires: Mehmood Kharotai and Mohammad Shah Fazalyar
Player of the match: Imran Mir (Mis Ainak Region)

- Amo Region won the toss and elected to bat.
- Ziaur Rahman (Mis Ainak Region) and Janat Gul (Amo Region) both made their first-class debuts.

1–4 December 2017
Scorecard

| Band-e-Amir Region | v | Speen Ghar Region |
| 338 (106.3 overs); Zia-ul-Haq 143 (252); Muslim Musa 5/104 (26.3 overs) | | 227 (74.4 overs); Bahir Shah 104 (165); Waqar Salamkheil 7/53 (22.3 overs) |
| 186 (57.5 overs); Sadiq Farhad 50 (64); Muslim Musa 4/61 (15.5 overs) | | 267 (76.5 overs); Shabir Noori 103 (158); Waqar Salamkheil 6/110 (31 overs) |

Band-e-Amir Region won by 30 runs
Ghazi Amanullah International Cricket Stadium, Ghazi Amanullah Town
Umpires: Farooq Khan and Mohammad Sabir
Player of the match: Waqar Salamkheil (Band-e-Amir Region)

- Band-e-Amir Region won the toss and elected to bat.
- Sadiq Farhad and Mohammad Inamullah (Band-e-Amir Region) both made their first-class debuts.

=== Round 9 ===
7–10 December 2017
Scorecard

| Amo Region | v | Boost Region |
| 390 (71.3 overs); Abdul Malik 150 (183); Karim Sadiq 6/96 (19.3 overs) | | 410 (113.4 overs); Munir Ahmad 100 (173); Zohaib Ahmadzai 6/128 (40 overs) |
| 357 (68.1 overs); Janat Gul 73 (70); Abdul Baqi 4/95 (22.1 overs) | | 261 (84.4 overs); Karim Sadiq 163 (225); Zohaib Ahmadzai 4/83 (26 overs) |

Amo Region won by 76 runs
Khost Cricket Stadium, Khost
Umpires: Ahmed Shah Durrani and Mehmood Kharotai
Player of the match: Karim Sadiq (Amo Region)

- Amo Region won the toss and elected to bat.
- Afzal Zazai (Amo Region), Izatullah and Abdul Rahman (Boost Region) all made their first-class debuts.

7–10 December 2017
Scorecard

| Speen Ghar Region | v | Band-e-Amir Region |
| 273 (90.3 overs); Shabir Noori 90 (232); Waqar Salamkheil 4/69 (24.3 overs) | | 567/8d (159 overs); Karim Janat 211* (323); Zahir Shehzad 4/184 (53.5 overs) |
| 387 (126.5 overs); Shabir Noori 122 (241); Waqar Salamkheil 5/127 (48.5 overs) | | 97/6 (16.1 overs); Usman Ghani 28 (23); Nasir Khan 2/20 (5 overs) |

Band-e-Amir Region won by 4 wickets
Ghazi Amanullah International Cricket Stadium, Ghazi Amanullah Town
Umpires: Ajmal Shamolzi and Mohammad Sabir
Player of the match: Karim Janat (Band-e-Amir Region)

- Speen Ghar Region won the toss and elected to bat.
- Naqib Nangarhari (Speen Ghar Region) made his first-class debut.

=== Round 10 ===
13–16 December 2017
Scorecard

| Amo Region | v | Mis Ainak Region |
| 297 (91.4 overs); Haji Murad Muradi 72 (129); Zia-ur-Rehman 5/71 (30.4 overs) | | 578/7d (137 overs); Shahidullah 175 (275); Zahid Zakhail 2/70 (15 overs) |
| 197/3 (46 overs); Mohibullah Oryakhel 68* (87); Shahidullah 1/25 (5 overs) |

Match drawn
Khost Cricket Stadium, Khost
Umpires: Ahmed Shah Durrani and Mehmood Kharotai
Player of the match: Shahidullah (Mis Ainak Region)

- Mis Ainak Region won the toss and elected to field.

13–16 December 2017
Scorecard

| Band-e-Amir Region | v | Boost Region |
| 502/8d (127.1 overs); Imran Janat 101 (189); Sayed Shirzad 4/104 (24.1 overs) | | 196 (55.3 overs); Karim Sadiq 67 (124); Waqar Salamkheil 4/60 (18.3 overs) |
| 54/4 (11.1 overs); Jawid Safi 14 (24); Dastagir Khan 2/19 (4 overs) | | 357 (82.3 overs) (f/o); Munir Ahmad 144 (238); Karim Janat 3/100 (17.3 overs) |

Band-e-Amir Region won by 6 wickets
Ghazi Amanullah International Cricket Stadium, Ghazi Amanullah Town
Umpires: Ajmal Shamolzi and Farooq Khan
Player of the match: Karim Janat (Band-e-Amir Region)

- Band-e-Amir Region won the toss and elected to bat.
- Jawid Safi (Band-e-Amir Region) made his first-class debut.

== Final ==
19–22 December 2017
Scorecard

| Band-e-Amir Region | v | Speen Ghar Region |
| 747/9d (182.4 overs); Younas Ahmadzai 210* (252); Yamin Ahmadzai 3/68 (25 overs) | | 196 (55 overs); Nasir Khan 46 (47); Waqar Salamkheil 6/56 (21 overs) |
| 265/4d (65.3 overs); Zia-ul-Haq 101* (132); Tahir Khan 2/66 (24 overs) | | 279 (68 overs); Qasim Oryakhail 81 (89); Mohammad Inamullah 6/89 (21 overs) |

Band-e-Amir Region won by 537 runs
Ghazi Amanullah International Cricket Stadium, Ghazi Amanullah Town
Umpires: Bismillah Jan Shinwari and Farooq Khan
Player of the match: Younas Ahmadzai (Band-e-Amir Region)

- Band-e-Amir Region won the toss and elected to bat.
