= List of Afghanistan Test cricketers =

This is a list of Afghanistan Test cricketers. Afghanistan were granted full membership and therefore Test status at the International Cricket Council's annual conference held on 22 June 2017, after a monumental rise through the associate ranks. A Test match is an international cricket match between two representative teams that are full members of the ICC. Both teams have two innings, and the match lasts up to five days. Afghanistan played their first Test match in June 2018 against India at the M. Chinnaswamy Stadium in Bengaluru.

The list is arranged in the order in which each player won his first Test cap. Where more than one player won his first Test cap in the same match, those players are listed alphabetically by surname.

== Key ==
General

- ‡ – Captain
- † – Wicket-keeper
- First – Year of debut
- Last – Year of latest game
- Mat – Number of matches played

Batting

- Innings – Innings batted
- NO – Times Not out
- Runs – Runs scored in career
- HS – Highest score
- Avg – Runs scored per dismissal
- * – Batsman remained not out

Bowling

- Balls – Balls bowled in career
- Mdn – Maiden overs bowled in career
- Wkt – Wickets taken in career
- BBI – Best bowling in an innings
- Ave – Average runs per wicket

Fielding

- Ca – Catches taken
- St – Stumpings taken

== Players ==
Statistics are correct as of 6 June 2026.

Afghan Test cricketers
Cap	Name	First	Last	Mat	Runs	HS	Avg	Balls	Wkt	BBI	Ave	Ca	St	Ref(s)
Cap	Name	First	Last	Mat	Batting			Bowling				Fielding		Ref(s)
1	Afsar Zazai †	2018	2026	10	378	113	23.62	0	–	–	–	23	1	
2	Asghar Afghan ‡	2018	2021	6	440	164	44.00	18	0	–	–	2	0	
3	Hashmatullah Shahidi ‡	2018	2026	12	796	246	44.22	264	1	1/91	164.00	4	0	
4	Javed Ahmadi	2018	2021	3	113	62	18.83	150	1	1/40	69.00	1	0	
5	Mohammad Nabi	2018	2019	3	33	24	5.50	546	8	3/36	31.75	2	0	
6	Mohammad Shahzad	2018	2019	2	69	40	17.25	0	–	–	–	0	0	
7	Mujeeb Ur Rahman	2018	2018	1	18	15	9.00	90	1	1/75	75.00	0	0	
8	Rahmat Shah	2018	2026	12	1,043	234	45.34	84	1	1/30	53.00	8	0	
9	Rashid Khan ‡	2018	2025	6	154	51	17.11	1,864	45	7/66	20.44	0	0	
10	Wafadar Momand	2018	2019	2	12	6*	6.00	222	2	2/100	77.50	0	0	
11	Yamin Ahmadzai	2018	2025	8	77	19	5.92	993	16	3/41	32.00	1	0	
12	Ihsanullah	2019	2019	3	110	65*	22.00	0	–	–	–	4	0	
13	Ikram Alikhil †	2019	2024	2	29	21	9.66	0	–	–	–	5	1	
14	Waqar Salamkheil	2019	2019	1	1	1*	—	186	4	2/35	25.25	0	0	
15	Ibrahim Zadran	2019	2025	8	602	114	37.62	12	1	1/13	13.00	11	0	
16	Qais Ahmad	2019	2024	2	45	21	11.25	188	3	2/98	44.66	0	0	
17	Zahir Khan	2019	2024	6	8	4*	1.60	900	15	3/59	46.60	0	0	
18	Amir Hamza	2019	2024	4	83	34	20.75	984	18	6/75	28.72	2	0	
19	Nasir Jamal	2019	2024	5	160	55*	22.85	12	0	–	–	4	0	
20	Abdul Malik	2021	2026	6	119	30	10.81	96	0	–	–	7	0	
21	Abdul Wasi	2021	2021	1	12	9	6.00	53	0	–	–	0	0	
22	Munir Ahmad	2021	2021	1	13	12	6.50	0	–	–	–	0	0	
23	Sayed Shirzad	2021	2021	1	–	–	–	252	3	2/48	32.33	0	0	
24	Shahidullah	2021	2025	3	63	29*	21.00	30	0	–	–	0	0	
25	Bahir Shah	2023	2025	2	51	32	17.00	0	–	–	–	0	0	
26	Karim Janat	2023	2024	2	95	41*	31.66	150	0	–	–	0	0	
27	Nijat Masood	2023	2024	3	16	12	3.20	419	9	5/79	34.22	0	0	
28	Mohammad Saleem	2024	2026	2	2	2	0.50	235	6	6/140	32.83	0	0	
29	Naveed Zadran	2024	2024	3	41	25	10.25	494	11	4/83	30.00	1	0	
30	Noor Ali Zadran	2024	2024	2	117	47	29.25	0	–	–	–	1	0	
31	Zia-ur-Rehman	2024	2025	4	42	13	7.00	792	11	5/64	36.72	1	0	
32	Rahmanullah Gurbaz †	2024	2026	3	133	46	22.16	0	–	–	–	3	0	
33	Azmatullah Omarzai	2024	2026	2	4	4	1.33	264	1	1/66	141.00	1	0	
34	AM Ghazanfar	2024	2024	1	6	6	6.00	218	4	3/127	40.25	1	0	
35	Sediqullah Atal	2024	2026	2	62	42	20.66	0	–	–	–	1	0	
36	Fareed Ahmad	2025	2025	1	19	17	19.00	156	2	2/27	35.50	0	0	
37	Ismat Alam	2025	2025	2	125	101	31.25	108	2	2/51	29.00	0	0	
38	Riaz Hassan	2025	2025	1	23	12	11.50	0	–	–	–	1	0	
39	Khalil Gurbaz	2025	2025	1	8	6	4.00	54	0	–	–	0	0	
40	Sharafuddin Ashraf	2025	2026	2	20	11	6.66	102	1	1/65	65.00	0	0	
41	Ziaur Rahman	2025	2026	2	0	6	2.00	336	7	7/97	23.50	0	0	
42	Nangialai Kharoti	2026	2026	1	10	6	10.00	138	0	–	–	0	0	

== See also ==
- Test cricket
- Afghanistan national cricket team
- List of Afghanistan ODI cricketers
- List of Afghanistan T20I cricketers
