= Kabir Alikhail =

Afghan cricketer (born 1996)

Personal information
- Born: 13 November 1996 (age 29); Paktia, Afghanistan
- Batting: Right-handed
- Bowling: Right-arm medium-fast

Domestic team information
- Years: Team
- 2017–present: Mis Ainak Region
- Source: Cricinfo, 10 August 2017

Kabir Alikhail (born 13 November 1996) is an Afghan cricketer. He made his List A debut for Mis Ainak Region in the 2017 Ghazi Amanullah Khan Regional One Day Tournament on 10 August 2017. He made his first-class debut for Mis Ainak Region in the 2017–18 Ahmad Shah Abdali 4-day Tournament on 20 October 2017.
