= Dilawar Khan (Afghan cricketer) =

Afghan cricketer

Personal information
- Full name: Dilawar Khan
- Born: Kabul, Afghanistan
- Source: Cricinfo, 26 October 2017

Dilawar Khan is an Afghan cricketer. He made his first-class debut for Boost Region in the 2017–18 Ahmad Shah Abdali 4-day Tournament on 26 October 2017.
