= Hamayun Omar =

Afghan cricketer

Personal information
- Full name: Hamayun Omar
- Source: Cricinfo, 13 August 2017

Hamayun Omar is an Afghan cricketer. He made his List A debut for Amo Region in the 2017 Ghazi Amanullah Khan Regional One Day Tournament on 13 August 2017. He made his first-class debut for Speen Ghar Region in the 2017–18 Ahmad Shah Abdali 4-day Tournament on 20 October 2017.
