= Shakirullah =

Afghan cricketer

Personal information
- Full name: Shakirullah
- Source: Cricinfo, 20 October 2017

Shakirullah is an Afghan cricketer. He made his first-class debut for Band-e-Amir Region in the 2017–18 Ahmad Shah Abdali 4-day Tournament on 20 October 2017.
