= Shah Zaib =

Afghan cricketer (born 1995)

Shahzaib Razi
Personal information
- Born: 18 April 1995 (age 31)
- Source: Cricinfo, 9 November 2017

Shah Zaib (born 18 April 1995) is an Afghan cricketer. He made his first-class debut for Boost Region in the 2017–18 Ahmad Shah Abdali 4-day Tournament on 7 November 2017.
