= Afghan cricket team in Zimbabwe in 2016–17 =

International cricket tour

	Zimbabwe	Afghanistan
- Dates: 27 January – 26 February 2017
Captains	Graeme Cremer	Asghar Stanikzai

One Day International series
- Results: Afghanistan won the 5-match series 3–2
Most runs	Solomon Mire (108)	Rahmat Shah Zurmatai (145)
Most wickets	Christopher Mpofu (12)	Rashid Khan (10); Mohammad Nabi (10)

LA series
- Result: Afghanistan won the 5-match series 4–1
Most runs	Ryan Burl (266)	Shafiqullah (156)
Most wickets	Tendai Chatara (6); Nathan Waller (6)	Nawaz Khan (11)

The Afghan cricket team toured Zimbabwe in January and February 2017. The tour consisted of five One Day International (ODI) matches. Ahead of the ODI series, the Afghanistan A cricket team played five "unofficial" List A ODIs against Zimbabwe A. Afghanistan won the List A series 4–1 and the ODI series 3–2.

Prior to the start of the ODI matches, Zimbabwe Cricket brought forward the fixtures in their domestic List A completion, the 2016–17 Pro50 Championship, in preparation for the tour.

== Squads ==
ODIs
Zimbabwe	Afghanistan
Graeme Cremer (c); Ryan Burl; Tendai Chatara; Elton Chigumbura; Craig Ervine; Peter Moor (wk); Hamilton Masakadza; Wellington Masakadza; Solomon Mire; Christopher Mpofu; Carl Mumba; Tarisai Musakanda; Richard Ngarava; Sikandar Raza; Donald Tiripano; Malcolm Waller; Nathan Waller	Asghar Stanikzai (c); Farid Ahmad; Aftab Alam; Amir Hamza; Ihsanullah; Karim Janat; Rashid Khan; Mohammad Nabi; Gulbadin Naib; Hashmatullah Shahidi; Mohammad Shahzad (wk); Samiullah Shinwari; Dawlat Zadran; Najibullah Zadran; Noor Ali Zadran; Rahmat Shah Zurmatai

Hamilton Masakadza was added to Zimbabwe's squad ahead of the 2nd ODI.

== List A series ==
=== 1st List A match ===
27 January 2017
09:30
Scorecard

Zimbabwe A 120 (26.5 overs)	v	Afghanistan A 121/5 (23.3 overs)
Tarisai Musakanda 37* (41); Abdullah Adil 4/22 (4.5 overs)		Imran Janat 28 (43); Nathan Waller 3/36 (6 overs)

Afghanistan A won by 5 wickets
Harare Sports Club, Harare
Umpires: Owen Chirombe (Zim) and Langton Rusere (Zim)

- Afghanistan A won the toss and elected to field.
- Abdullah Adil, Imran Janat, Khaibar Omar, Rahmanullah Gurbaz, Shahidullah, Waheedullah Shafaq, Younas Ahmadzai and Zia-ur-Rehman (Afghanistan A) all made their List A debuts.

=== 2nd List A match ===
29 January 2017
09:30
Scorecard

Afghanistan A 208 (47.3 overs)	v	Zimbabwe A 126 (27.5 overs)
Shafiqullah 50 (53); Carl Mumba 4/44 (9 overs)		Ryan Burl 55 (46); Fazal Niazai 3/20 (6 overs)

Afghanistan A won by 55 runs (DLS method)
Harare Sports Club, Harare
Umpires: Jeremiah Matibiri (Zim) and Langton Rusere (Zim)

- Zimbabwe A won the toss and elected to field.
- Rain during Zimbabwe A's innings set them a revised total of 182 from 31 overs.
- Nasir Khan, Zamir Khan (Afghanistan A) and Ryan Murray (Zimbabwe A) all made their List A debuts.

=== 3rd List A match ===
31 January 2017
09:30
Scorecard

Afghanistan A 279/4 (50 overs)	v	Zimbabwe A 259/9 (50 overs)
Younas Ahmadzai 104 (109); Tendai Chatara 2/52 (10 overs)		Innocent Kaia 100 (154); Nawaz Khan 5/51 (10 overs)

Afghanistan A won by 20 runs
Harare Sports Club, Harare
Umpires: Jeremiah Matibiri (Zim) and Langton Rusere (Zim)

- Zimbabwe A won the toss and elected to field.
- Mohammad Ibrahim and Nawaz Khan (Afghanistan A) both made their List A debuts.

=== 4th List A match ===
3 February 2017
09:30
Scorecard

Zimbabwe A 212/8 (50 overs)	v	Afghanistan A 162/4 (36.3 overs)
Tinotenda Mutombodzi 62 (63); Nawaz Khan 5/51 (10 overs)		Waheedullah Shafaq 51* (83); Wellington Masakadza 2/40 (10 overs)

Afghanistan A won by 6 wickets (DLS method)
Harare Sports Club, Harare
Umpires: Owen Chirombe (Zim) and Russell Tiffin (Zim)

- Afghanistan A won the toss and elected to field.
- Rain during Afghanistan A's innings set them a revised total of 162 from 40 overs.
- Richard Ngarava (Zim) made his List A debut.

=== 5th List A match ===
5 February 2017
09:30
Scorecard

Zimbabwe A 288/8 (50 overs)	v	Afghanistan A 73 (25.4 overs)
Ryan Burl 105 (104); Abdullah Adil 3/67 (10 overs)		Noor-ul-Haq 12 (30); Tendai Chatara 3/13 (6 overs)

Zimbabwe A won by 215 runs
Harare Sports Club, Harare
Umpires: Owen Chirombe (Zim) and Russell Tiffin (Zim)

- Zimbabwe A won the toss and elected to bat.
- Brandon Mavuta (Zim) made his List A debut.

== ODI series ==
=== 1st ODI ===
16 February 2017
09:30
Scorecard

Afghanistan; 215 (49.2 overs)	v	Zimbabwe; 99/4 (27.2 overs)
Asghar Stanikzai 50 (57); Graeme Cremer 3/46 (10 overs)		Craig Ervine 38* (56); Gulbadin Naib 1/12 (6 overs)

Afghanistan won by 12 runs (DLS method)
Harare Sports Club, Harare
Umpires: Shaun George (SA) and Russell Tiffin (Zim)
Player of the match: Asghar Stanikzai (Afg)

- Afghanistan won the toss and elected to bat.
- Rain stopped play during Zimbabwe's innings, setting them a revised total of 207 from 46 overs.
- Play was attempted to be restarted after the rain delay, however, no further play was possible due to an issue with the outfield.
- Ryan Burl and Richard Ngarava (Zim) both made their ODI debuts.

=== 2nd ODI ===
19 February 2017
09:30
Scorecard

Afghanistan; 238/9 (50 overs)	v	Zimbabwe; 184 (42.4 overs)
Mohammad Shahzad 64 (87); Tendai Chatara 3/36 (10 overs)		Solomon Mire 54 (55); Rashid Khan 3/25 (7.1 overs)

Afghanistan won by 54 runs
Harare Sports Club, Harare
Umpires: Shaun George (SA) and Russell Tiffin (Zim)
Player of the match: Rashid Khan (Afg)

- Afghanistan won the toss and elected to bat.

=== 3rd ODI ===
21 February 2017
09:30
Scorecard

Zimbabwe; 129 (32.4 overs)	v	Afghanistan; 126 (29.3 overs)
Tarisai Musakanda 60 (74); Gulbadin Naib 4/27 (6 overs)		Asghar Stanikzai 31 (33); Sean Williams 3/15 (5.3 overs)

Zimbabwe won by 3 runs
Harare Sports Club, Harare
Umpires: Shaun George (SA) and Langton Rusere (Zim)
Player of the match: Tendai Chatara and Sean Williams (Zim)

- Zimbabwe won the toss and elected to bat.
- This was the lowest total that Zimbabwe had successfully defended in an ODI.

=== 4th ODI ===
24 February 2017
09:30
Scorecard

Afghanistan; 111 (38.5 overs)	v	Zimbabwe; 107/3 (22.2 overs)
Asghar Stanikzai 19 (17); Christopher Mpofu 3/25 (7.5 overs)		Solomon Mire 46 (50); Mohammad Nabi 2/11 (5.2 overs)

Zimbabwe won by 7 wickets (DLS method)
Harare Sports Club, Harare
Umpires: Shaun George (SA) and Jeremiah Matibiri (Zim)
Player of the match: Christopher Mpofu (Zim)

- Afghanistan won the toss and elected to bat.
- Rain stopped play during Afghanistan's innings, reducing the game to 42 overs per side, with Zimbabwe set a target of 105 runs.
- Ihsanullah and Karim Janat (Afg) both made their ODI debuts.

=== 5th ODI ===
26 February 2017
09:30
Scorecard

Afghanistan; 253/9 (50 overs)	v	Zimbabwe; 54 (13.5 overs)
Rahmat Shah Zurmatai 50 (79); Chris Mpofu 3/46 (9 overs)		Graeme Cremer 14* (14); Mohammad Nabi 3/14 (3.5 overs)

Afghanistan won by 106 runs (DLS method)
Harare Sports Club, Harare
Umpires: Shaun George (SA) and Jeremiah Matibiri (Zim)
Player of the match: Rahmat Shah Zurmatai (Afg)

- A rain delay during the innings break set Zimbabwe a revised total of 161 from 22 overs.
- Afghanistan won the toss and elected to bat.
- This was Zimbabwe's third-lowest total in ODIs and their lowest total against Afghanistan.
