= Rashid Zadran =

Afghan cricketer

Personal information
- Full name: Rashid Zadran
- Batting: Right-handed
- Bowling: Right-arm off break

Domestic team information
- Years: Team
- 2017–present: Speen Ghar Region
- Source: Cricinfo, 10 August 2017

Rashid Zadran is an Afghan cricketer. He made his List A debut for Speen Ghar Region in the 2017 Ghazi Amanullah Khan Regional One Day Tournament on 10 August 2017. He made his first-class debut for Mis Ainak Region in the 2017–18 Ahmad Shah Abdali 4-day Tournament on 20 October 2017. In the second innings, he was given out obstructing the field.
