= Izatullah =

Afghan cricketer (born 1996)

Personal information
- Full name: Izatullah
- Born: 15 February 1996 (age 30); Kabul, Afghanistan
- Source: Cricinfo, 10 December 2017

Izatullah (born 15 February 1996) is an Afghan cricketer. He made his first-class debut for Boost Region in the 2017–18 Ahmad Shah Abdali 4-day Tournament on 7 December 2017.
