= Khalid Zahedi =

Afghan cricketer (born 1998)

Personal information
- Full name: Khalid Zahedi
- Born: 5 March 1998 (age 28)
- Source: Cricinfo, 1 November 2017

Khalid Zahedi (born 5 March 1998) is an Afghan cricketer. He made his first-class debut for Amo Region in the 2017–18 Ahmad Shah Abdali 4-day Tournament on 1 November 2017. He made his List A debut for Logar Province in the 2019 Afghanistan Provincial Challenge Cup tournament on 1 August 2019.
