= Janat Gul (cricketer) =

Afghan cricketer (born 1991)

Personal information
- Born: 5 December 1991 (age 34)
- Source: Cricinfo, 4 December 2017

Janat Gul (born 5 December 1991) is an Afghan cricketer. He made his first-class debut for Amo Region in the 2017–18 Ahmad Shah Abdali 4-day Tournament on 1 December 2017. He made his Twenty20 debut on 12 September 2020, for Amo Sharks in the 2020 Shpageeza Cricket League.
