= Waheedullah Shafaq =

Afghan cricketer (born 1997)

Personal information
- Full name: Syed Waheedullah Shafaq
- Born: 2 January 1997 (age 29)
- Batting: Right-handed
- Role: Batter, wicket-keeper
- Source: ESPNcricinfo, 27 January 2017

Waheedullah Shafaq (born 2 January 1997) is an Afghan cricketer. He made his List A debut for Afghanistan A against Zimbabwe A during their tour to Zimbabwe on 27 January 2017. He was named in Afghanistan's squad for the 2014 Under-19 Cricket World Cup.

He made his Twenty20 debut for Boost Defenders in the 2017 Shpageeza Cricket League on 13 September 2017. He made his first-class debut for Speen Ghar Region in the 2017–18 Ahmad Shah Abdali 4-day Tournament on 20 October 2017.

In September 2018, he was named in Kandahar's squad in the first edition of the Afghanistan Premier League tournament. In November 2019, he was named in Afghanistan's squad for the 2019 ACC Emerging Teams Asia Cup in Bangladesh.
