= Nasir Khan (Afghan cricketer) =

Afghan cricketer (born 1998)

Personal information
- Full name: Nasir Khan Omar
- Born: 29 December 1998 (age 27)
- Source: ESPNcricinfo, 29 January 2017

Nasir Khan (born 29 December 1998) is an Afghan cricketer. He List A debut for Afghanistan A came against Zimbabwe A during their tour to Zimbabwe on 29 January 2017. He made his Twenty20 debut for Boost Defenders in the 2017 Shpageeza Cricket League on 13 September 2017. Khan's made his first-class debut for Speen Ghar Region in the 2017–18 Ahmad Shah Abdali 4-day Tournament on 20 October 2017.

In November 2019, he was named in Afghanistan's squad for the 2019 ACC Emerging Teams Asia Cup in Bangladesh.
