= Khaibar Omar =

Afghan cricketer (born 1996)

Personal information
- Born: 6 January 1996 (age 30); Laghman Province, Afghanistan
- Batting: Right-handed
- Bowling: Right-arm off break

Domestic team information
- Years: Team
- 2017: Kabul Eagles
- Source: ESPNcricinfo, 13 September 2017

Khaibar Omar (born 1 June 1996) is an Afghan cricketer. His List A debut for Afghanistan A came against Zimbabwe A during their tour to Zimbabwe on 27 January 2017. He made his Twenty20 debut for Kabul Eagles in the 2017 Shpageeza Cricket League on 11 September 2017. He made his first-class debut for Boost Region in the 2017–18 Ahmad Shah Abdali 4-day Tournament on 26 October 2017.

In September 2018, he was named in Nangarhar's squad in the first edition of the Afghanistan Premier League tournament.
