= Zamir Khan =

Afghan cricketer

Personal information
- Full name: Zamir Khan
- Born: 16 March 1992 (age 34); Afghanistan
- Batting: Left-handed
- Bowling: Slow left-arm orthodox

International information
- National side: Afghanistan (2012-2012)
- Only T20I (cap 19): 8 March 2012 v Canada

Career statistics
Competition	Twenty20
Matches	5
Runs scored	–
Batting average	–
100s/50s	–/–
Top score	–
Balls bowled	96
Wickets	3
Bowling average	29.66
5 wickets in innings	–
10 wickets in match	–
Best bowling	1/6
Catches/stumpings	1/–
- Source: Cricinfo, 16 March 2012

Zamir Khan (born 16 March 1992) is an Afghan cricketer. Khan is a left-handed batsman who bowls slow left-arm orthodox.

Khan was a member of Afghanistan's squad for the 2011 ACC Twenty20 Cup in Nepal. It was during this tournament that he made his debut for Afghanistan against Oman. He made five further appearances during the tournament, including in the final against Hong Kong, which Afghanistan won. He was later selected in Afghanistan's squad for the 2012 World Twenty20 Qualifier in Dubai. His Twenty20 debut came during this tournament, (Note: Although the Asian Twenty20 was played to Twenty20 rules, it did not hold official Twenty20 status.) against Denmark. He claimed his maiden wicket in that format during this match, that of Aftab Ahmed to finish with figures of 1/6 from three overs. His second appearance during the tournament, against Nepal, but went wicketless.

He made his List A debut for Afghanistan A against Zimbabwe A during their tour to Zimbabwe on 29 January 2017. He made his first-class debut for Speen Ghar Region in the 2017–18 Ahmad Shah Abdali 4-day Tournament on 1 November 2017.

In September 2018, he was named in Kabul's squad in the first edition of Afghanistan Premier League.
