= Yahya Khan (cricketer) =

Afghan cricketer

Personal information
- Full name: Yahya Khan
- Source: Cricinfo, 20 October 2017

Yahya Khan is an Afghan cricketer. He made his first-class debut for Amo Region in the 2017–18 Ahmad Shah Abdali 4-day Tournament on 20 October 2017. He made his Twenty20 debut on 12 September 2020, for Amo Sharks in the 2020 Shpageeza Cricket League. He made his List A debut on 21 October 2021, for Amo Region in the 2021 Ghazi Amanullah Khan Regional One Day Tournament.
