= Jawid Safi =

Afghan cricketer

Personal information
- Full name: Jawid Safi
- Source: Cricinfo, 16 December 2017

Jawid Safi is an Afghan cricketer. He made his first-class debut for Band-e-Amir Region in the 2017–18 Ahmad Shah Abdali 4-day Tournament on 13 December 2017.
