= Wali Bahadur =

Afghan cricketer (born 1990)

Personal information
- Born: 8 May 1990 (age 36)
- Source: Cricinfo, 28 November 2017

Wali Bahadur (born 8 May 1990) is an Afghan cricketer. He made his first-class debut for Band-e-Amir Region in the 2017–18 Ahmad Shah Abdali 4-day Tournament on 25 November 2017.
