= Khairullah =

Afghan cricketer (born 1999)

Personal information
- Born: 3 February 1999 (age 27)
- Source: Cricinfo, 26 October 2017

Khairullah (born 3 February 1999) is an Afghan cricketer. He made his first-class debut for Speen Ghar Region in the 2017–18 Ahmad Shah Abdali 4-day Tournament on 26 October 2017.
