= Mohammad Nasir =

Afghan cricketer (born 1998)

Personal information
- Born: 4 January 1998 (age 28)
- Source: Cricinfo, 26 October 2017

Mohammad Nasir (born 4 January 1998) is an Afghan cricketer. He made his first-class debut for Boost Region in the 2017–18 Ahmad Shah Abdali 4-day Tournament on 26 October 2017.
