= Ahsanullah (cricketer) =

Afghan cricketer (born 1997)

Personal information
- Born: 11 May 1997 (age 29); Paktia, Afghanistan
- Source: Cricinfo, 1 November 2017

Ahsanullah (born 11 May 1997) is an Afghan cricketer. He made his first-class debut for Boost Region in the 2017–18 Ahmad Shah Abdali 4-day Tournament on 1 November 2017.
