= Noorullah (cricketer) =

Afghan cricketer

Personal information
- Full name: Noorullah
- Source: Cricinfo, 26 October 2017

Noorullah is an Afghan cricketer. He made his first-class debut for Amo Region in the 2017–18 Ahmad Shah Abdali 4-day Tournament on 26 October 2017.
