= Sadam Mangal =

Afghan cricketer (born 1998)

Personal information
- Born: 8 April 1998 (age 28)
- Source: Cricinfo, 29 October 2017

Sadam Mangal (born 8 April 1998) is an Afghan cricketer. He made his first-class debut for Mis Ainak Region in the 2017–18 Ahmad Shah Abdali 4-day Tournament on 26 October 2017. He made his List A debut for Mis Ainak Region in the 2019 Ghazi Amanullah Khan Regional One Day Tournament on 11 September 2019.
