= Younas Ahmadzai =

Afghan cricketer (born 1995)

Personal information
- Full name: Younas Khan Ahmadzai
- Born: 16 November 1995 (age 30); Afghanistan
- Batting: Right-handed
- Bowling: Right-arm off-break

Domestic team information
- Years: Team
- 2017: Amo Region
- 2017/18: Speen Ghar Tigers
- 2017/18–2021/22: Band-e-Amir Region
- 2018/19: Boost Defenders
- 2018/19: Kabul Zwanan
- 2019/20–2020/21: Kabul Eagles
- 2025: Leinster Lightning

Career statistics
Competition	FC	LA	T20
Matches	21	25	17
Runs scored	1,324	580	224
Batting average	35.78	26.36	14.93
100s/50s	3/3	1/3	0/1
Top score	210*	104	53
Balls bowled	52	6	–
Wickets	2	0	–
Bowling average	17.50	–	–
5 wickets in innings	0	–	–
10 wickets in match	0	–	–
Best bowling	1/1	–	–
Catches/stumpings	23/–	12/1	7/–
- Source: Cricinfo, 1 August 2026

Younas Khan Ahmadzai (born 16 November 1995) is an Afghan cricketer. He made his List A debut for Afghanistan A against Zimbabwe A during their tour to Zimbabwe on 27 January 2017. He was named in Afghanistan's squad for the 2014 Under-19 Cricket World Cup.

He made his Twenty20 debut for Speen Ghar Tigers in the 2017 Shpageeza Cricket League on 11 September 2017. He made his first-class debut for Band-e-Amir Region in the 2017–18 Ahmad Shah Abdali 4-day Tournament on 20 October 2017. In the final of the 2017–18 Ahmad Shah Abdali 4-day Tournament, batting for Band-e-Amir Region against Speen Ghar Region, he scored 210 not out in the first innings.
