= Muslim Musa =

Afghan cricketer (born 1997)

Personal information
- Born: 15 January 1997 (age 29); Nangarhar, Afghanistan
- Batting: Right-handed
- Bowling: Right-arm medium

Domestic team information
- Years: Team
- 2017–present: Amo Region
- Source: Cricinfo, 10 August 2017

Muslim Musa (born 15 January 1997) is an Afghan cricketer. He made his List A debut for Amo Region in the 2017 Ghazi Amanullah Khan Regional One Day Tournament on 10 August 2017. Before his List A debut, he was part of Afghanistan's squad for the 2016 Under-19 Cricket World Cup.

He made his Twenty20 debut for Band-e-Amir Dragons in the 2017 Shpageeza Cricket League on 12 September 2017. He made his first-class debut for Speen Ghar Region in the 2017–18 Ahmad Shah Abdali 4-day Tournament on 20 October 2017.

In September 2018, he was named in Kabul's squad in the first edition of the Afghanistan Premier League tournament.
