= Sadiq Farhad =

Afghan cricketer

Personal information
- Full name: Sadiq Farhad
- Source: Cricinfo, 14 August 2017

Sadiq Farhad is an Afghan cricketer. He made his List A debut for Mis Ainak Region in the 2017 Ghazi Amanullah Khan Regional One Day Tournament on 14 August 2017. He made his first-class debut for Band-e-Amir Region in the 2017–18 Ahmad Shah Abdali 4-day Tournament on 1 December 2017.
