= Farhan Zakhil =

Afghan cricketer (born 2003)

Personal information
- Full name: Farhan Zakhil
- Born: 11 May 2003 (age 23); Khost, Afghanistan
- Batting: Right-handed
- Bowling: Right-arm off break
- Role: Batsman

Domestic team information
- Years: Team
- 2020-present: Amo Sharks (squad no. 100)
- Source: Cricinfo, 20 October 2017

Farhan Zakhil (born 11 May 2003) is an Afghan cricketer. He made his first-class debut for Amo Region in the 2017–18 Ahmad Shah Abdali 4-day Tournament on 20 October 2017. He made his List A debut for Amo Region in the 2018 Ghazi Amanullah Khan Regional One Day Tournament on 10 July 2018. In September 2018, he was named in Balkh's squad in the first edition of the Afghanistan Premier League tournament.

Zakhil was the captain of Afghanistan's squad for the 2020 Under-19 Cricket World Cup. He made his Twenty20 debut on 7 September 2020, for Amo Sharks in the 2020 Shpageeza Cricket League.
