= Abdul Rahman (Boost Defenders cricketer) =

Afghan cricketer

Personal information
- Full name: Abdul Rahman
- Born: Paktia, Afghanistan
- Batting: Left-handed
- Bowling: Slow left-arm orthodox
- Role: Bowler
- Source: ESPNcricinfo, 10 December 2017

Abdul Rahman is an Afghan cricketer. He made his first-class debut for Boost Region in the 2017–18 Ahmad Shah Abdali 4-day Tournament on 7 December 2017. He made his List A debut for Herat Province in the 2019 Afghanistan Provincial Challenge Cup tournament on 1 August 2019.
