= Nasir Totakhil =

Afghan cricketer (born 2000)

Personal information
- Born: 15 March 2000 (age 26)
- Batting: Left-handed
- Bowling: Left-arm leg spin
- Source: Cricinfo, 11 September 2017

Nasir Totakhil (born 15 March 2000) is an Afghan cricketer. He made his Twenty20 debut for Amo Sharks in the 2017 Shpageeza Cricket League on 11 September 2017. He made his first-class debut for Mis Ainak Region in the 2017–18 Ahmad Shah Abdali 4-day Tournament on 20 October 2017. He made his List A debut for Mis Ainak Region in the 2018 Ghazi Amanullah Khan Regional One Day Tournament on 13 July 2018.

In September 2018, he was named in Kabul's squad in the first edition of the Afghanistan Premier League tournament.
