= Zahid Zakhail =

Afghan cricketer

Personal information
- Full name: Zahid Zakhail
- Source: Cricinfo, 20 October 2017

Zahid Zakhail is an Afghan cricketer. He made his first-class debut for Amo Region in the 2017–18 Ahmad Shah Abdali 4-day Tournament on 20 October 2017. He made his List A debut for Boost Region in the 2018 Ghazi Amanullah Khan Regional One Day Tournament on 18 July 2018. He made his Twenty20 debut on 13 September 2020, for Amo Sharks in the 2020 Shpageeza Cricket League.
