= Mohammad Sardar =

Afghan cricketer (born 1999)

Personal information
- Born: 22 September 1999 (age 27); Kabul, Afghanistan
- Batting: Right-handed
- Role: Wicket-keeper

Domestic team information
- Years: Team
- 2017–present: Mis Ainak Region
- Source: Cricinfo, 10 August 2017

Mohammad Sardar (born 22 September 1999) is an Afghan cricketer. He made his List A debut for Mis Ainak Region in the 2017 Ghazi Amanullah Khan Regional One Day Tournament on 10 August 2017. He made his Twenty20 debut for Kabul Eagles in the 2017 Shpageeza Cricket League on 18 September 2017. He made his first-class debut for Band-e-Amir Region in the 2017–18 Ahmad Shah Abdali 4-day Tournament on 20 October 2017.
