= Zia-ul-haq (Afghan cricketer, born 1999) =

Afghan cricketer (born 1999)

Zia-ul-Haq
Personal information
- Full name: Zia-ul-Haq Esa Khel
- Born: 18 September 1999 (age 27)
- Source: Cricinfo, 12 January 2018

Zia-ul-haq (born 18 September 1999) is an Afghan cricketer. He made his first-class debut for Mis Ainak Region in the 2017–18 Ahmad Shah Abdali 4-day Tournament on 20 October 2017. He made his List A debut on 16 October 2021, for Amo Region in the 2021 Ghazi Amanullah Khan Regional One Day Tournament.
