= Tahir Khan (Afghan cricketer) =

Afghan cricketer (born 1997)

Mohammad Tahir Adil (Note: Listed as Mohammad Tahir Adil on Cricinfo but as Tahir Khan on CricketArchive)
Personal information
- Full name: Mohammad Tahir Adil
- Born: 4 September 1997 (age 29); Nangarhar, Afghanistan
- Batting: Right-handed
- Bowling: Right-arm off break
- Role: Allrounder

Domestic team information
- Years: Team
- 2017–2023/24: Speen Ghar Region
- 2017/18: Amo Sharks
- 2018/19: Paktia Royals
- 2019/20: Kabul Eagles
- 2020/21: Boost Defenders
- 2022: Band-e-Amir Dragons
- 2023: Pamir Legends
- 2023–2024/25: Hindukush Strikers
- 2024: Speen Ghar Tigers
- Source: Cricinfo, 10 August 2017

Mohammad Tahir Adil (born 4 September 1997) is an Afghan cricketer. He made his List A debut for Speen Ghar Region in the 2017 Ghazi Amanullah Khan Regional One Day Tournament on 10 August 2017. He made his Twenty20 debut for Amo Sharks in the 2017 Shpageeza Cricket League on 11 September 2017. He made his first-class debut for Speen Ghar Region in the 2017–18 Ahmad Shah Abdali 4-day Tournament on 20 October 2017.
