= Zia-ul-Haq (Afghan cricketer) =

Afghan cricketer

Personal information
- Full name: Zia-ul-Haq
- Born: Parwan, Afghanistan
- Source: Cricinfo, 11 August 2017

Zia-ul-Haq is an Afghan cricketer. He made his List A debut for Speen Ghar Region in the 2017 Ghazi Amanullah Khan Regional One Day Tournament on 11 August 2017. He made his first-class debut for Band-e-Amir Region in the 2017–18 Ahmad Shah Abdali 4-day Tournament on 20 October 2017, scoring a century in the first innings.

In the final of the 2018 Ahmad Shah Abdali 4-day Tournament, he was named the man of the match. He also finished the tournament as the leading run-scorer for Band-e-Amir Region, with 714 runs in nine matches.
