= Asadullah Matani =

Afghan cricketer (born 1998)

Personal information
- Born: 10 October 1998 (age 28); Balkh, Afghanistan
- Batting: Right-handed
- Bowling: Legbreak

Domestic team information
- Years: Team
- 2017–present: Band-e-Amir Region
- Source: Cricinfo, 10 August 2017

Asadullah Matani (born 10 October 1998) is an Afghan cricketer. He made his List A debut for Band-e-Amir Region in the 2017 Ghazi Amanullah Khan Regional One Day Tournament on 16 August 2017. He made his first-class debut for Amo Region in the 2017–18 Ahmad Shah Abdali 4-day Tournament on 20 October 2017.

In September 2018, he was named in Balkh's squad in the first edition of the Afghanistan Premier League tournament. He made his Twenty20 debut on 7 September 2020, for Amo Sharks in the 2020 Shpageeza Cricket League.
