= Nazir Ahmad (cricketer) =

Afghan cricketer

Personal information
- Full name: Nazir Ahmad
- Source: Cricinfo, 9 November 2017

Nazir Ahmad is an Afghan cricketer. He made his first-class debut for Boost Region in the 2017–18 Ahmad Shah Abdali 4-day Tournament on 7 November 2017.
