= Rahim Mangal =

Afghan cricketer (born 1995)

Personal information
- Born: 25 July 1995 (age 31)
- Batting: Right-handed
- Bowling: Right-arm off break

Domestic team information
- Years: Team
- 2017–present: Band-e-Amir Region
- Source: Cricinfo, 10 August 2017

Rahim Mangal (born 25 July 1995) is an Afghan cricketer. He made his List A debut for Band-e-Amir Region in the 2017 Ghazi Amanullah Khan Regional One Day Tournament on 10 August 2017. He was the leading run-scorer in the tournament, making 276 runs in five innings. He made his first-class debut for Mis Ainak Region in the 2017–18 Ahmad Shah Abdali 4-day Tournament on 20 October 2017. He made his Twenty20 debut on 12 October 2019, for Amo Sharks in the 2019 Shpageeza Cricket League.
