= Juma Gul =

Afghan cricketer (born 1999)

Personal information
- Born: 10 November 1999 (age 27)
- Source: Cricinfo, 11 September 2017

Juma Gul (born 10 November 1999) is an Afghan cricketer. He made his Twenty20 debut for Boost Defenders in the 2017 Shpageeza Cricket League on 11 September 2017. He made his first-class debut for Amo Region in the 2017–18 Ahmad Shah Abdali 4-day Tournament on 20 October 2017. He made his List A debut for Amo Region in the 2023 Ghazi Amanullah Khan Regional One Day Tournament on 29 October 2023.
