= Tamim Surkhorodi =

Afghan cricketer (born 2001)

Personal information
- Born: 22 May 2001 (age 25); Kandahar, Afghanistan
- Role: Batsman

Domestic team information
- Years: Team
- 2019-present: Speenghar Tigers (squad no. 100)
- Source: Cricinfo, 15 November 2017

Tamim Surkhorodi (born 22 May 2001) is an Afghan cricketer. He made his first-class debut for Amo Region in the 2017–18 Ahmad Shah Abdali 4-day Tournament on 13 November 2017. He made his List A debut for Speen Ghar Region in the 2018 Ghazi Amanullah Khan Regional One Day Tournament on 25 July 2018. He made his Twenty20 debut on 13 October 2019, for Speen Ghar Tigers in the 2019 Shpageeza Cricket League.
