= Ihsanullah Ihsan =

Afghan cricketer (born 1992)

Personal information
- Born: 21 March 1992 (age 34)
- Source: Cricinfo, 16 August 2017

Ihsanullah Ihsan (born 21 March 1992) is an Afghan cricketer. He made his List A debut for Boost Region in the 2017 Ghazi Amanullah Khan Regional One Day Tournament on 16 August 2017. He made his first-class debut for Mis Ainak Region in the 2017–18 Ahmad Shah Abdali 4-day Tournament on 25 November 2017.
