= Asif Musazai =

Afghan cricketer (born 2003)

Personal information
- Full name: Asif Musazai
- Born: 1 September 2003 (age 23)
- Source: Cricinfo, 9 November 2017

Asif Musazai (born 1 September 2003) is an Afghan cricketer. He made his first-class debut for Band-e-Amir Region in the 2017–18 Ahmad Shah Abdali 4-day Tournament on 7 November 2017. In May 2018, during the final of the 2018 Ahmad Shah Abdali 4-day Tournament, he scored a century in the first innings for Band-e-Amir Region against Amo Region. He made his Twenty20 debut on 8 October 2019, for Speen Ghar Tigers in the 2019 Shpageeza Cricket League.

He was a member of Afghanistan's squad for the 2020 Under-19 Cricket World Cup. He made his List A debut on 19 October 2020, for Band-e-Amir Region in the 2020 Ghazi Amanullah Khan Regional One Day Tournament.
