= Nijat Masood =

Afghan cricketer

Personal information
- Born: 30 December 1998 (age 27); Kabul, Afghanistan
- Batting: Right-handed
- Bowling: Right-arm medium
- Role: Bowler

International information
- National side: Afghanistan
- Test debut (cap 26): 14 June 2023 v Bangladesh
- Last Test: 28 February 2024 v Ireland
- T20I debut (cap 46): 11 June 2022 v Zimbabwe
- Last T20I: 14 June 2022 v Zimbabwe

Domestic team information
- Years: Team
- 2017–present: Mis Ainak Region (squad no. 99)

Career statistics
Competition	Test	T20I	FC	LA
Matches	3	3	34	51
Runs scored	16	4	341	125
Batting average	3.20	–	7.93	6.94
100s/50s	0/0	0/0	0/1	0/0
Top score	12	4*	71	16*
Balls bowled	419	66	4,757	2,386
Wickets	9	4	105	84
Bowling average	34.22	23.75	30.39	23.75
5 wickets in innings	1	0	6	2
10 wickets in match	0	0	0	0
Best bowling	5/79	3/39	7/37	7/23
Catches/stumpings	0/–	1/–	6/–	8/–
Medal record
Representing Afghanistan
Men's Cricket
Asian Games
Silver medal – second place	2022 Hangzhou	Team
- Source: Cricinfo, 19 July 2026

Nijat Masood (Pashto: نجات مسعود) (born 30 December 1998) is an Afghan cricketer, who mainly plays as a right-arm medium bowler. He made his international debut for the Afghanistan cricket team in June 2022.

== Career ==
He made his List A debut for Mis Ainak Region in the 2017 Ghazi Amanullah Khan Regional One Day Tournament on 10 August 2017. Prior to his List A debut, he was part of Afghanistan's squad for the 2016 Under-19 Cricket World Cup.

He made his first-class debut for Band-e-Amir Region in the 2017–18 Ahmad Shah Abdali 4-day Tournament on 20 October 2017, taking six wickets for 55 runs in the first innings.

In July 2018, he was the leading wicket-taker in the 2018 Ghazi Amanullah Khan Regional One Day Tournament, with thirteen dismissals in five matches. In September 2018, he was named in Kabul's squad in the first edition of the Afghanistan Premier League tournament.

He made his Twenty20 debut for the Boost Defenders in the 2018 Abu Dhabi T20 Trophy on 5 October 2018. He was the leading wicket-taker in the 2019 Afghanistan Provincial Challenge Cup, with seventeen dismissals in five matches. In November 2019, he was named in Afghanistan's squad for the 2019 ACC Emerging Teams Asia Cup in Bangladesh. Following a strong performance in the ACC Emerging Teams Asia Cup, he was named in Afghanistan's Test squad, for their one-off match against the West Indies.

In February 2022, he was named in Afghanistan's Twenty20 International (T20I) squad for their series against Bangladesh. In May 2022, he was named in Afghanistan's T20I squad for their series against Zimbabwe, and as a reserve in Afghanistan's One Day International (ODI) squad for the same tour. He made his T20I debut on 11 June 2022, for Afghanistan against Zimbabwe.

He made his Test debut for Afghanistan against Bangladesh, on 14 June 2023.
