= Abdul Baqi (cricketer) =

Afghan cricketer

Personal information
- Full name: Abdul Baqi
- Bowling: Right-arm legbreak (googly)
- Source: Cricinfo, 26 October 2017

Abdul Baqi is an Afghan cricketer. He made his first-class debut for Boost Region in the 2017–18 Ahmad Shah Abdali 4-day Tournament on 26 October 2017. The following month, in his second match, he took his first five-wicket haul, with figures of 5 wickets for 99 runs.

He was the leading wicket-taker for Boost Region in the 2018 Ahmad Shah Abdali 4-day Tournament, with 36 dismissals in nine matches.

He made his List A debut for Boost Region in the 2018 Ghazi Amanullah Khan Regional One Day Tournament on 13 July 2018. In September 2018, he was named in Kandahar's squad in the first edition of the Afghanistan Premier League tournament. He made his Twenty20 debut on 12 September 2020, for Mis Ainak Knights in the 2020 Shpageeza Cricket League.
