= Abdullah Mazari =

Afghan cricketer

Personal information
- Full name: Abdullah Mazari
- Born: 1 January 1987 (age 39); Mazar-i-Sharif, Balkh Province, Afghanistan
- Batting: Left-handed
- Bowling: Slow left-arm orthodox
- Role: All-rounder

International information
- National side: Afghanistan
- ODI debut (cap 21): 9 October 2010 v Kenya
- Last ODI: 11 October 2010 v Kenya

Domestic team information
- Years: Team
- 2011/12: Afghan Cheetahs
- 2010/11: Peshawar Panthers
- 2008/09: Peshawar

Career statistics
Competition	ODI	FC	LA	T20
Matches	2	21	16	13
Runs scored	3	305	125	–
Batting average	3.00	9.53	12.50	–
100s/50s	0/0	0/1	0/1	–
Top score	3	63	58	–
Balls bowled	16	537	190	11
Wickets	2	64	6	0
Bowling average	24.50	40.53	27.26	–
5 wickets in innings	0	0	0	–
10 wickets in match	0	0	0	–
Best bowling	1/18	5/116	4/43	–
Catches/stumpings	1/–	6/–	5/–	0/–
- Source: CricketArchive, 30 September 2011

Abdullah Mazari (born 1 January 1987) is an Afghan former cricketer. A left-handed batsman and a left-arm orthodox spin bowler, he played for the Afghanistan national cricket team in two ODI matches in 2010. He has also represented domestic teams, including Peshawar, Peshawar Panthers, and Afghan Cheetahs.

== Biography ==
Born in Mazar-i-Sharif in 1987, Abdullah first played for Afghanistan in October 2001 in a Grade II Quaid-e-Azam Trophy match against Nowshera. He played three matches for Afghanistan two years later, but it would be several years before he returned to the national side. During this period, he played for Nowshera in the lower tiers of Pakistani domestic cricket, including a match against Afghanistan in 2007.

He made his first-class debut in Pakistan for Peshawar against Sialkot in the Quaid-e-Azam Trophy in February 2009. The following week, he played against Faisalabad. He returned to the Afghanistan national team in 2010, playing in an Intercontinental Cup match against Scotland in Ayr.

In October 2010, he made his ODI debut, playing twice against Kenya. He also featured in the final of the 2009–10 Intercontinental Cup against Scotland in Dubai, where Afghanistan won by seven wickets.

In 2011, Abdullah played four List A matches for the Peshawar Panthers and one Twenty20 match for the Afghan Cheetahs.

In July 2018, Abdullah was the leading wicket-taker for the Kabul Region in the 2018 Ghazi Amanullah Khan Regional One Day Tournament, claiming seven dismissals in four matches.
