= Imran Mir =

Afghan cricketer (born 2001)

Personal information
- Full name: Imran Mir
- Born: 30 September 2001 (age 25); Logar, Afghanistan
- Batting: Right-handed

International information
- National side: Afghanistan
- Only T20I (cap 65): 11 November 2025 v Qatar

Domestic team information
- Years: Team
- 2017–2024: Boost Region
- 2017/18–2020/21: Mis Ainak Knights
- 2019/20: Kabul Eagles
- 2021/22–present: Amo Sharks
- 2024/25: Mah-e-Par Stars
- 2024: Speenghar Tigers
- Source: Cricinfo, 20 October 2017

Imran Mir (born 30 September 2001) is an Afghan cricketer. He made his first-class debut for Mis Ainak Region in the 2017–18 Ahmad Shah Abdali 4-day Tournament on 20 October 2017. He made his Twenty20 debut on 12 October 2019, for Kabul Eagles in the 2019 Shpageeza Cricket League.

Mir was a member of Afghanistan's squad for the 2020 Under-19 Cricket World Cup.
