= Zahir Shehzad =

Afghan cricketer (born 1998)

Personal information
- Full name: Zahir Shehzad
- Born: 23 September 1998 (age 28)

Domestic team information
- Years: Team
- 2017–present: Amo Region
- Source: Cricinfo, 10 August 2017

Zahir Shehzad (born 23 September 1998) is an Afghan cricketer. He made his List A debut for Amo Region in the 2017 Ghazi Amanullah Khan Regional One Day Tournament on 10 August 2017. He made his first-class debut for Speen Ghar Region in the 2017–18 Ahmad Shah Abdali 4-day Tournament on 20 October 2017, taking five wickets for 119 runs in the second innings. He finished the 2017–18 Ahmad Shah Abdali 4-day Tournament as the joint-leading wicket-taker, with a total of 55 wickets.

He made his Twenty20 debut for Kabul Zwanan in the 2018–19 Afghanistan Premier League on 5 October 2018.
