= Jamshid Khan (cricketer) =

Afghan cricketer (born 2003)

Jamshid Miralikhil
Personal information
- Full name: Jamshid Miralikhil
- Born: 3 March 2003 (age 23)
- Source: Cricinfo, 20 October 2017

Jamshid Miralikhil (born 3 March 2003) is an Afghan cricketer. He made his first-class debut for Amo Region in the 2017–18 Ahmad Shah Abdali 4-day Tournament on 20 October 2017. He made his List A debut for Amo Region in the 2018 Ghazi Amanullah Khan Regional One Day Tournament on 23 July 2018.

He was a member of Afghanistan's squad for the 2020 Under-19 Cricket World Cup.
