= Ihsanullah =

Afghan cricketer

Personal information
- Full name: Ihsanullah Janat
- Born: 28 September 1997 (age 29); Khost, Afghanistan
- Batting: Right-handed
- Role: Batter
- Relatives: Nawroz Mangal (brother)

International information
- National side: Afghanistan
- Test debut (cap 12): 15 March 2019 v Ireland
- Last Test: 27 November 2019 v West Indies
- ODI debut (cap 40): 24 February 2017 v Zimbabwe
- Last ODI: 23 September 2018 v Bangladesh
- Only T20I (cap 47): 14 June 2022 v Zimbabwe

Domestic team information
- Years: Team
- 2017: Boost Region

Career statistics
Competition	Test	ODI	T20I	FC
Matches	3	16	1	19
Runs scored	110	307	20	1,568
Batting average	22.00	21.92	20.00	56.00
100s/50s	0/1	0/3	0/0	4/8
Top score	65*	57*	20	248
Catches/stumpings	4/–	10/–	0/–	12/–
- Source: Cricinfo, 30 December 2024

Ihsanullah Janat (born 28 December 1997) is an Afghan cricketer who plays as a right-handed opening batsman. He made his first-class debut for Afghanistan against the Netherlands in the 2015–17 ICC Intercontinental Cup on 29 July 2016. Prior to his first-class debut, he captained the Afghanistan U-19 team in the 2016 Under-19 Cricket World Cup. He made his Test cricket debut in March 2019. Ihsanullah is the younger brother of former Afghanistan captain Nawroz Mangal.

== International career ==
He made his One Day International (ODI) debut against Zimbabwe at the Harare Sports Club on 24 February 2017. He made his domestic List A debut (having already played two List A matches for Afghanistan A and the ODI against Zimbabwe) for Boost Region in the 2017 Ghazi Amanullah Khan Regional One Day Tournament on 11 August 2017. He made his Twenty20 debut for Mis Ainak Knights in the 2017 Shpageeza Cricket League on 12 September 2017.

In November 2017, in Afghanistan's Intercontinental Cup match against the United Arab Emirates, Ihsanullah and Rahmat Shah Zurmatai made the highest partnership for Afghanistan in first-class cricket, scoring 197 runs for the second wicket. Ihsanullah also scored his maiden first-class century in the process.

In December 2018, he was named in Afghanistan's under-23 team for the 2018 ACC Emerging Teams Asia Cup.

In May 2018, he was named in Afghanistan's squad for their inaugural Test match, played against India, but he was not selected for the match. In February 2019, he was named in Afghanistan's Test squad for their one-off match against Ireland in India. He made his Test debut for Afghanistan against Ireland on 15 March 2019.

In May 2022, he was named in Afghanistan's Twenty20 International (T20I) squad for their series against Zimbabwe. He made his T20I debut on 14 June 2022, for Afghanistan against Zimbabwe.

== T20 franchise career ==
In September 2018, he was named in Paktia's squad in the first edition of the Afghanistan Premier League tournament.
