= Nasir Jamal =

Afghan cricketer

Personal information
- Born: 21 December 1993 (age 32); Afghanistan
- Batting: Right-handed
- Bowling: Right-arm leg break
- Role: Middle-order batter
- Relatives: Raees Ahmadzai (brother)

International information
- National side: Afghanistan
- Test debut (cap 19): 27 November 2019 v West Indies
- Last Test: 28 February 2024 v Ireland
- ODI debut (cap 33): 22 July 2014 v Zimbabwe
- Last ODI: 6 March 2018 v Zimbabwe

Domestic team information
- Years: Team
- 2017: Band-e-Amir Region

Career statistics
Competition	Test	ODI	FC	LA
Matches	5	16	49	90
Runs scored	160	352	3,096	2,394
Batting average	22.85	27.07	43.00	32.79
100s/50s	0/1	0/3	6/19	3/16
Top score	55*	53	172	107*
Balls bowled	12	6	1,095	664
Wickets	0	0	10	9
Bowling average	–	–	56.00	50.88
5 wickets in innings	–	–	0	0
10 wickets in match	–	–	0	0
Best bowling	–	–	4/20	2/15
Catches/stumpings	4/–	4/–	46/–	42/–
- Source: Cricinfo, 19 July 2026

Nasir Jamal (born 21 December 1993) is an Afghan cricketer, who plays for the national cricket team. He made his international debut in July 2014.

== Career ==
Jamal's One Day International (ODI) debut was against Zimbabwe in July 2014. He made his Twenty20 debut for Mis Ainak Knights in the 2017 Shpageeza Cricket League on 12 September 2017.

In September 2018, he was named in Kandahar's squad in the first edition of the Afghanistan Premier League tournament.

In December 2018, he was included in Afghanistan's under-23 team for the 2018 ACC Emerging Teams Asia Cup.

=== Test cricket ===
In May 2018, he was named in Afghanistan's squad for their inaugural Test match, played against India, but he was not selected for the match. In February 2019, he was named in Afghanistan's Test squad for their one-off match against Ireland in India, but was not selected in the playing eleven. In November 2019, he was again named in Afghanistan's Test squad, this time for the one-off match against the West Indies. He made his Test debut for Afghanistan, against the West Indies, on 27 November 2019.
