= Shabir Noori =

Afghan cricketer

Shabbir Noori
Personal information
- Full name: Shabbir Ahmed Noori
- Born: 23 February 1992 (age 34); Nangarhar Province, Afghanistan
- Batting: Right-handed
- Bowling: Right-arm off break

International information
- National side: Afghanistan (2010–2016)
- ODI debut (cap 18): 18 February 2010 v Canada
- Last ODI: 25 September 2016 v Bangladesh
- Only T20I (cap 18): 18 March 2012 v Canada

Domestic team information
- Years: Team
- 2017: Band-e-Amir Region

Career statistics
Competition	ODI	T20I	FC	LA
Matches	10	1	10	13
Runs scored	191	15	355	254
Batting average	19.10	15.00	22.18	19.53
100s/50s	0/1	0/0	0/2	0/1
Top score	94	15	85	94
Catches/stumpings	6/–	0/–	4/–	6/–
Medal record
Representing Afghanistan
Men's Cricket
Asian Games
Silver medal – second place	2010 Guangzhou	Team
- Source: ESPNcricinfo, 2 April 2017

Shabbir Noori (born 23 February 1992) is a cricketer who plays for the Afghanistan national cricket team. Noori is a right-handed batsman and right-arm off break bowler.

== Career ==
Noori represented the Afghanistan U-19 cricket team in 2007, making his debut against Malaysia in the ACC Under-19 Elite Cup.

In November 2009, Noori was a key member of Afghanistan's 2009 ACC Twenty20 Cup winning squad. During the tournament, he made his unofficial Twenty20 debut against Singapore. This also marked his international debut for the senior squad.

In January 2010, Noori made his first-class debut in the Intercontinental Cup against Ireland, where Noori made his maiden first-class half century by scoring 85 in Afghanistan's first innings. Noori scored 21 in their second innings, as Afghanistan won the match by seven wickets.

In February 2010 he played in Afghanistan's Intercontinental Cup match against Canada. In the Afghan first innings he scored 60 runs while opening the batting, although he was positioned down the order in Afghanistan's successful chase of 494.

== International career ==
Following this match Noori made his One Day International debut against Canada at the Sharjah Cricket Association Stadium. Noori scored just 9 runs batting at number six. He was later named in Afghanistan's squad for the 2010 ICC World Twenty20.
