= Bismillah Jan Shinwari =

Afghan cricket umpire (1984–2025)

Bismillah Jan Shinwari بسم‌الله جان شینواری

Personal information
- Born: 17 March 1984
- Died: 8 July 2025 (aged 41)
- Role: Umpire

Umpiring information
- ODIs umpired: 25 (2018–2025)
- T20Is umpired: 21 (2018–2024)
- Source: Cricinfo, 27 March 2023

Bismillah Jan Shinwari (Pashto: بسم‌الله جان شینواری; 17 March 1984 – 8 July 2025) was an Afghan cricket umpire. He stood in matches in the 2017 Ghazi Amanullah Khan Regional One Day Tournament and the 2017–18 Ahmad Shah Abdali 4-day Tournament in Afghanistan.

Shinwari stood in his first Twenty20 International (T20I) match, between Afghanistan and Zimbabwe, on 5 February 2018. A week later, on 11 February 2018, he stood in his first One Day International (ODI) match, also between Afghanistan and Zimbabwe.

== Bomb blast ==
On 3 October 2020, a car bomb attack in Nangarhar Province, Afghanistan, killed 15 people and wounded 30 others. It was initially reported that Shinwari was there at the time of the explosion but had survived. However, later reports stated that he had been killed in the blast, along with his cousin, two of his children, and a nephew. On 4 October 2020, Shinwari spoke to the Bangladeshi website BD Crictime on a telephone call to confirm that he had not been killed in the blast.

== Death ==
Shinwari died on 8 July 2025, at the age of 41. He reportedly travelled to Pakistan for weight loss surgery, but the procedure was fraught with complications, and he ultimately died.

His untimely death was met with widespread mourning in the cricketing world. The International Cricket Council (ICC) issued a statement expressing its condolences and recognised his contributions as an international umpire. ICC Chair Jay Shah also paid tribute, stating that his passing was a major loss to the global cricket community.

== See also ==
- List of One Day International cricket umpires
- List of Twenty20 International cricket umpires
