= Zia-ur-Rehman =

Afghan cricketer

Personal information
- Full name: Zia-ur-Rehman Akbar
- Born: 30 December 1997 (age 28); Kabul, Afghanistan
- Batting: Right-handed
- Bowling: Left-arm orthodox
- Role: Bowling all-rounder

International information
- National side: Afghanistan
- Test debut (cap 32): 2 February 2024 v Sri Lanka
- Last Test: 2 January 2025 v Zimbabwe
- Only ODI (cap 58): 11 July 2023 v Bangladesh

Career statistics
Competition	Test	ODI	FC	LA
Matches	4	1	44	58
Runs scored	42	5	898	316
Batting average	7.00	5.00	14.48	10.89
100s/50s	0/0	0/0	0/2	0/0
Top score	13	5	69	36
Balls bowled	792	21	10,193	2,854
Wickets	11	0	215	85
Bowling average	36.72	–	20.47	23.42
5 wickets in innings	1	–	17	2
10 wickets in match	0	–	3	0
Best bowling	5/64	–	7/70	5/26
Catches/stumpings	1/–	0/–	16/–	18/–
- Source: ESPNcricinfo, 19 July 2026

Zia-ur-Rehman Akbar (Pashto: ضیاء الرحمن اکبر) (born 30 December 1997) is an Afghan cricketer, who has played for the Afghanistan national cricket team.

== Career ==
He made his List A debut for Afghanistan A against Zimbabwe A during their tour to Zimbabwe on 27 January 2017. He made his Twenty20 debut for Boost Defenders in the 2017 Shpageeza Cricket League on 11 September 2017. He made his first-class debut for Mis Ainak Region in the 2017–18 Ahmad Shah Abdali 4-day Tournament on 20 October 2017.

He finished the 2017–18 Ahmad Shah Abdali 4-day Tournament as the joint-leading wicket-taker, with a total of 55 wickets. He was the leading wicket-taker for Mis Ainak Region in the 2018 Ahmad Shah Abdali 4-day Tournament, with 46 dismissals in eight matches.

In September 2018, he was named in Paktia's squad in the first edition of the Afghanistan Premier League tournament. In December 2018, he was named in Afghanistan's under-23 team for the 2018 ACC Emerging Teams Asia Cup.

He was part of Afghanistan's Test squad for their series against Zimbabwe in March 2021. In May 2022, he was named in Afghanistan's One Day International (ODI) squad for their series against Zimbabwe.

He made his ODI debut against Bangladesh on 11 July 2023, and his Test debut against Zimbabwe on 2 February 2024.
