= Ziaur Rahman (Afghan cricketer) =

Afghan cricketer (born 1998)

Personal information
- Full name: Ziawrahman Sharifi
- Born: 17 October 1998 (age 28); Khost, Afghanistan
- Batting: Right-handed
- Bowling: Right-arm fast-medium

International information
- National side: Afghanistan
- Test debut (cap 41): 20 October 2025 v Zimbabwe
- Last Test: 6 June 2026 v India
- ODI debut (cap 66): 13 June 2026 v India
- Last ODI: 20 June 2026 v India
- T20I debut (cap 37): 24 February 2019 v Ireland
- Last T20I: 19 February 2026 v South Africa

Career statistics
Competition	Test	ODI	T20I	FC
Matches	2	2	6	30
Runs scored	6	5	–	219
Batting average	2.00	5.00	–	6.44
100s/50s	0/0	0/0	–/–	0/0
Top score	6	4	–	31
Balls bowled	336	48	132	4,316
Wickets	8	1	7	90
Bowling average	23.50	60.00	31.85	26.10
5 wickets in innings	1	0	0	4
10 wickets in match	0	0	0	0
Best bowling	7/97	1/39	3/36	7/97
Catches/stumpings	0/–	0/–	4/–	25/–
- Source: Cricinfo, 19 July 2026

Ziaur Rahman (Pashto: ضیاء الرحمن) (or Ziawrahman Sharifi, born 17 October 1998) is an Afghan cricketer. He made his international debut for the Afghanistan cricket team in February 2019.

== Career ==
He made his List A debut for Speen Ghar Region in the 2017 Ghazi Amanullah Khan Regional One Day Tournament on 16 August 2017. He made his first-class debut for Mis Ainak Region in the 2017–18 Ahmad Shah Abdali 4-day Tournament on 1 December 2017. He made his Twenty20 debut for Paktia Panthers in the 2018–19 Afghanistan Premier League on 10 October 2018.

In February 2019, he was named in Afghanistan's Twenty20 International (T20I) squad for their series against Ireland in India. He made his T20I debut for Afghanistan against Ireland on 24 February 2019.
