= Abdul Malik (cricketer) =

Afghan cricketer (born 1998)

Personal information
- Born: 11 March 1998 (age 28); Baghlan, Afghanistan
- Batting: Right-handed
- Bowling: Right arm off break
- Role: Opening batter

International information
- National side: Afghanistan
- Test debut (cap 20): 2 March 2021 v Zimbabwe
- Last Test: 6 June 2026 v India
- ODI debut (cap 62): 22 September 2024 v South Africa
- Last ODI: 21 December 2024 v Zimbabwe

Domestic team information
- Years: Team
- 2014–2018: Amo Sharks

Career statistics
Competition	Test	ODI	FC	LA
Matches	6	4	47	60
Runs scored	119	122	3,553	2,173
Batting average	10.81	40.66	43.32	42.60
100s/50s	0/0	0/1	11/13	7/11
Top score	30	84	220	137
Balls bowled	96	–	636	492
Wickets	0	–	7	12
Bowling average	–	–	55.71	38.50
5 wickets in innings	–	–	0	0
10 wickets in match	–	–	0	0
Best bowling	–	–	2/10	2/24
Catches/stumpings	7/–	0/–	44/–	28/–
- Source: Cricinfo, 19 July 2026

Abdul Malik (Pashto: عبدالمالک) (born 11 March 1998) is an Afghan cricketer. He made his international debut for the Afghanistan cricket team in March 2021.

He made his first-class debut for Amo Region in the 2017–18 Ahmad Shah Abdali 4-day Tournament on 26 October 2017. He made his List A debut for Amo Region in the 2019 Ghazi Amanullah Khan Regional One Day Tournament on 10 September 2019. He made his Twenty20 debut on 13 October 2019, for Kabul Eagles in the 2019 Shpageeza Cricket League.

In November 2019, he was named in Afghanistan's squad for the 2019 ACC Emerging Teams Asia Cup in Bangladesh. In February 2021, he was named in Afghanistan's Test squad for their series against Zimbabwe. He made his Test debut against Zimbabwe, on 2 March 2021. However, he became the first batsman for Afghanistan to be dismissed for a pair in Test cricket.
