= Mohammad Ibrahim (cricketer) =

Afghan cricketer (born 1998)

Personal information
- Full name: Mohammad Ibrahim Abdulrahimzai
- Born: 20 December 1998 (age 27)
- Batting: Right-handed
- Bowling: Right-arm medium-fast
- Role: Bowler

Domestic team information
- Years: Team
- 2017: Band-e-Amir Region
- 2017–2021: Amo Region
- 2017-present: Speen Ghar Region
- 2017–2020: Kabul Eagles

Career statistics
Competition	FC	LA	T20
Matches	10	14	8
Runs scored	68	62	0
Batting average	8.50	20.66	0.00
100s/50s	0/0	0/0	0/0
Top score	22	47*	0*
Balls bowled	1,786	684	168
Wickets	48	14	10
Bowling average	20.10	43.00	20.00
5 wickets in innings	5	0	0
10 wickets in match	1	0	0
Best bowling	6/21	2/22	3/10
Catches/stumpings	5/0	1/0	0/0
- Source: ESPNcricinfo, 8 June 2023

Mohammad Ibrahim (born 20 December 1998) is an Afghan cricketer. He made his List A debut for Afghanistan A against Zimbabwe A during their tour to Zimbabwe on 31 January 2017. He made his Twenty20 debut for Kabul Eagles in the 2017 Shpageeza Cricket League on 18 September 2017. He made his first-class debut for Speen Ghar Region in the 2017–18 Ahmad Shah Abdali 4-day Tournament on 20 October 2017.

== International career ==
In June 2023, he received his first international call-up in Afghanistan's Test squad for their series against Bangladesh.
