= Bahir Shah =

Afghan cricketer

Personal information
- Full name: Said Bahir Shah Mehboob
- Born: 21 February 2000 (age 26); Kunar Province, Afghanistan
- Batting: Right-handed
- Bowling: Right-arm off break
- Role: Top-order batter

International information
- National side: Afghanistan
- Test debut (cap 25): 14 June 2023 v Bangladesh
- Last Test: 20 October 2025 v Zimbabwe

Domestic team information
- Years: Team
- 2017—: Speen Ghar

Career statistics
Competition	Test	FC	LA	T20
Matches	2	55	58	21
Runs scored	51	4,301	1,987	380
Batting average	17.00	54.44	42.27	20.00
100s/50s	0/0	13/17	3/14	0/1
Top score	32	303*	130*	56
Balls bowled	–	311	16	–
Wickets	–	7	4	–
Bowling average	–	35.14	3.25	–
5 wickets in innings	–	0	0	–
10 wickets in match	–	0	0	–
Best bowling	–	1/0	4/2	–
Catches/stumpings	0/–	44/1	25/–	6/–
- Source: Cricinfo, 19 July 2026

Bahir Shah (Pashto: باهیر شاه) (born 21 February 2000) is an Afghan cricketer. In domestic cricket, he plays for the Speen Ghar Tigers, and he has also played for the Afghanistan under-19 cricket team. Since his debut in 2017, Bahir has set several records in first-class cricket.

== Career ==
He made his first-class debut for Speen Ghar Region in the 2017–18 Ahmad Shah Abdali 4-day Tournament on 20 October 2017, scoring 256 runs not out in the first innings. It was the second-highest score on debut, and he became the 17th player to score a double century on first-class debut.

The following month, in his third first-class match, he scored a century in both innings, making 111 and 116, respectively. In his next match, he scored 303 not out in the first innings against Boost Region. He became the second-youngest player, behind Javed Miandad, to score a triple century in first-class cricket. From his first six innings in first-class cricket he made 831 runs, the most by any player, breaking the previous record of 741 runs made by Bill Ponsford. He scored his 1,000th run in first-class cricket in his eleventh innings, the second-fastest behind Ponsford. He finished the 2017–18 Ahmad Shah Abdali 4-day Tournament as the leading run-scorer, with a total of 1,096 runs.

In December 2017, he was named in Afghanistan's squad for the 2018 Under-19 Cricket World Cup. In January 2018, his batting average in first-class cricket was 121.77. This was the highest for any batsman who had scored at least 1,000 first-class runs, with Donald Bradman second on the list with an average of 95.14.

However, for the 2018 Ahmad Shah Abdali 4-day Tournament, his form dropped, scoring 408 runs in 7 matches, with just one century. His average for the tournament was 34, with his career average dropping to 71.61.

He made his List A debut for Speen Ghar Region in the 2018 Ghazi Amanullah Khan Regional One Day Tournament on 11 July 2018. He only played in two matches during the tournament, scoring a total of sixteen runs, with an average of eight. In April 2019, in the opening match of the 2019 Ahmad Shah Abdali 4-day Tournament, he scored 156 not out against Boost Region, and was named the player of the match. He finished the tournament with 400 runs in five matches, including two centuries.

In September 2019, in Speen Ghar Region's first match of the 2019 Ghazi Amanullah Khan Regional One Day Tournament, he scored an unbeaten 103. He finished the tournament with 237 runs, including two centuries, from his four innings. He also took four wickets from just eight balls.

He made his Twenty20 debut for Speen Ghar Tigers in the 2019 Shpageeza Cricket League on 11 October 2019, but only scored three runs. Shah only played in one more match in the tournament, scoring 26 runs in his two innings.

In November 2019, he was named in Afghanistan's squad for the 2019 ACC Emerging Teams Asia Cup in Bangladesh. In August 2020, he was the leading run-scorer in the 2020 Afghanistan Provincial Challenge Cup, finishing the tournament with 244 runs. The following month, Bahir played in just one match in the 2020 Shpageeza Cricket League, in the game between Speen Ghar Tigers and Kabul Eagles. He top-scored for the team, with 37 runs from 30 balls, although Speen Ghar Tigers lost the match by six wickets.

In February 2021, he was named in Afghanistan's Test squad for their series against Zimbabwe.

He made his Test debut for Afghanistan against Bangladesh, on 14 June 2023.

== See also ==
- List of double centuries scored on first-class cricket debut
