= Ahmed Shah Durrani (umpire) =

Afghan cricket umpire (born 1975)

Personal information
- Born: 9 April 1975 (age 51); Jalalabad, Afghanistan
- Role: Umpire

Umpiring information
- ODIs umpired: 12 (2017–2025)
- T20Is umpired: 25 (2016–2025)
- Source: Cricinfo, 15 March 2023

Ahmed Shah Durrani (born 09 April 1975) is a cricket umpire from Afghanistan. He officiated in his first Twenty20 International (T20I) match, between the United Arab Emirates and Afghanistan, on 14 December 2016. His first One Day International (ODI) match as an umpire was between Afghanistan and Ireland on 17 March 2017. As of March 2023, he had officiated in 7 ODIs and 14 T20Is.

== See also ==
- List of One Day International cricket umpires
- List of Twenty20 International cricket umpires
