= 2024 Shpageeza Cricket League =

Cricket tournament in Afghanistan

- Dates: 12 August – 24 August 2024
- Administrator: Afghanistan Cricket Board (ACB)
- Cricket format: Twenty20
- Tournament format(s): Double round-robin and final
- Host: Afghanistan
- Champions: Amo Sharks (1st title)
- Runners-up: Band-e-Amir Dragons
- Participants: 5
- Matches: 21
- Player of the series: Zubaid Akbari (Amo Sharks)
- Most runs: Sediqullah Atal (Band-e-Amir Dragons) (423)
- Most wickets: Allah Mohammad Ghazanfar (Band-e-Amir Dragons) (18)

The 2024 Shpageeza Cricket League (also known as for sponsorship reasons as 2024 X-Bull Energy Shpageeza Cricket League) was the 9th edition of the Shpageeza Cricket League, a professional Twenty20 cricket (T20) league established by the Afghanistan Cricket Board (ACB) in 2013, and the fifth edition to have official T20 status. It was originally scheduled to run from 10 to 25 September 2024, with the number of teams decreasing from eight to five. However, no tournament took place in 2023, with the Afghanistan Cricket Board (ACB) announcing that the tournament would be played in August 2024. The Speenghar Tigers are the defending champions.

== Squads ==
Squads were announced on 4 August 2024.

Amo Sharks	Band-e-Amir Dragons	Boost Defenders	Mis Ainak Knights	Speenghar Tigers
Azmatullah Omarzai (c); Mohammad Ishaq (wk); Abdul Malik; Zubaid Akbari; Mohammad Haroon; Shahidullah Kamal; Javeed Ahmadzai; Ijaz Ahmad; Hayat Nasiri; Masood Gurbaz; Sharafuddin Ashraf; Juma Gul; Qais Ahmad; Mohammadullah Logari; Fazal Haq Farooqi; Saleem Safi; Mohammad Gul; Kamil Kakar	Hashmatullah Shahidi (c); Mahboob Taskeen (wk); Sediqullah Atal; Riaz Hassan; Asif Mosazai; Sediqullah Pacha; Ali Ahmad; Karim Janat; Shams Ur Rahman; Nangialai Kharoti; Amir Hamza; Allah Mohammad Ghazanfar; Babar Khan; Naveen-ul-Haq; Khalil Ahmad; Abdullah Ahmadzai; Nijat Masood	Rahmat Shah (c); Noman Shah (wk); Hazratullah Zazai; Mohammad Akram; Bilal Ahmad Tareen; Najibullah Zadran; Darwish Rasooli; Ijaz Ahmad Ahmadzai; Abdul Hadi; Gulbadin Naib; Noor Ahmad; Nasir Khan; Abdul Baqi; Fareed Ahmad Malik; Ziaur Rahman; Bashir Ahmad; Samiullah Sarmast	Ibrahim Zadran (c); Afsar Zazai (wk); Naveed Obaid; Wafiullah Tarakhil; Nasir Jamal; Subhanullah Senzai; Rahmanullah Zadran; Yousuf Shah; Mohammad Nabi; Abdul Rahman Rahmani; Mujeeb Ur Rahman; Zia-ur-Rehman; Khalil Gurbaz; Abdullah Tarakhil; Naveed Zadran; Nasim Mangal; Yama Arab	Rashid Khan (c) (Note: Samiullah Shinwari captained Speenghar Tigers in their first four and last matches of the group stage.); Samiullah Shinwari; Rahmanullah Gurbaz (wk); Hassan Eisakhil; Imran Mir; Baheer Shah; Allah Noor; Barakatullah Kadada; Ikram Alikhil; Tariq Stanikzai; Ismat Alam; Zahir Khan; Waheed Zadran; Arab Gul; Yamin Ahmadzai; Bilal Sami; Mohammad Ibrahim; Faridoon Dawoodzai

== Points table ==
Pos	Team	Pld	W	L	NR	Pts	NRR	Qualification
1	Band-e-Amir Dragons	8	5	3	0	10	0.563	Advanced to final
2	Amo Sharks	8	5	3	0	10	0.172	Advanced to final
3	Boost Defenders	8	4	4	0	8	−0.003	
4	Mis Ainak Knights	8	4	4	0	8	−0.572	
5	Speenghar Tigers	8	2	6	0	4	−0.247	

Source: ESPNcricinfo

== Fixtures ==
12 August 2024
09:00
Scorecard

Band-e-Amir Dragons; 167/6 (20 overs)	v	Speenghar Tigers; 148/9 (20 overs)
Sediqullah Atal 69 (46); Zahir Khan 3/31 (4 overs)		Bahir Shah 38 (25); Allah Mohammad Ghazanfar 3/11 (4 overs)

Band-e-Amir Dragons won by 19 runs
Kabul International Cricket Stadium, Kabul
Umpires: Ahmad Shah Pakteen and Muhammad Sabir
Player of the match: Allah Mohammad Ghazanfar (Band-e-Amir Dragons)

- Speenghar Tigers won the toss and elected to field.

12 August 2024
14:00
Scorecard

Amo Sharks; 151/7 (20 overs)	v	Mis Ainak Knights; 152/2 (20 overs)
Shahidullah 48* (44); Zia-ur-Rehman 2/21 (4 overs)		Ibrahim Zadran 80 (62); Mohammadullah 1/18 (3 overs)

Mis Ainak Knights won by 8 wickets
Kabul International Cricket Stadium, Kabul
Umpires: Farooq Khan and Izatullah Safi
Player of the match: Ibrahim Zadran (Mis Ainak Knights)

- Amo Sharks won the toss an elected to bat.
- Naveed Zadran (Mis Ainak Knights) made his T20 debut.
- Shahidullah scored his 1,000th run in T20s.

13 August 2024
09:00
Scorecard

Speenghar Tigers; 166/7 (20 overs)	v	Boost Defenders; 170/3 (19.2 overs)
Samiullah Shinwari 43 (25); Noor Ahmad 4/16 (4 overs)		Mohammad Akram 62 (37); Faridoon Dawoodzai 1/28 (4 overs)

Boost Defenders won by 7 wickets
Kabul International Cricket Stadium, Kabul
Umpires: Ajmal Shamolzi and Bismillah Jan Shinwari
Player of the match: Noor Ahmad (Boost Defenders)

- Boost Defenders won the toss and elected to field.
- Bashir Ahmad (Boost Defenders) made his T20 debut.

13 August 2024
14:00
Scorecard

Amo Sharks; 147/7 (20 overs)	v	Band-e-Amir Dragons; 148/5 (19.2 overs)
Zubaid Akbari 58 (49); Allah Mohammad Ghazanfar 1/15 (4 overs)		Hashmatullah Shahidi 57* (48); Qais Ahmad 2/24 (4 overs)

Band-e-Amir Dragons won by 5 wickets
Kabul International Cricket Stadium, Kabul
Umpires: Ahmed Shah Durrani and Mahmood Kharoti
Player of the match: Hashmatullah Shahidi (Band-e-Amir Dragons)

- Amo Sharks won the toss and elected to bat.

14 August 2024
09:00
Scorecard

Boost Defenders; 179/8 (20 overs)	v	Band-e-Amir Dragons; 179/8 (20 overs)
Mohammad Shahzad 46 (32); Aftab Alam 3/44 (4 overs)		Riaz Hassan 54 (40); Bashir Ahmad 2/22 (4 overs)

Match tied (Boost Defendrs won the Super Over)
Kabul International Cricket Stadium, Kabul
Umpires: Farooq Khan and Izatullah Safi
Player of the match: Bashir Ahmad (Boost Defenders)

- Band-e-Amir Dragons won the toss and elected to field.
- Ali Ahmad (Band-e-Amir Dragons) made his T20 debut.
- Super Over: Band-e-Amir Dragons 12/1, Boost Defenders 13/1.

14 August 2024
14:00
Scorecard

Speenghar Tigers; 105 (19.2 overs)	v	Mis Ainak Knights; 108/3 (12.3 overs)
Tariq Stanikzai 21 (22); Zia-ur-Rehman 2/14 (4 overs)		Wafiullah Tarakhil 77* (38); Bilal Sami 2/23 (2.3 overs)

Mis Ainak Knights won by 8 wickets
Kabul International Cricket Stadium, Kabul
Umpires: Ahmad Shah Pakteen and Muhammad Sabir
Player of the match: Wafiullah Tarakhil (Mis Ainak Knights)

- Speenghar Tigers won the toss and elected to bat.

16 August 2024
09:00
Scorecard

Boost Defenders; 145/5 (20 overs)	v	Amo Sharks; 149/4 (17 overs)
Ijaz Ahmad Ahmadzai 37* (25); Sharafuddin Ashraf 2/21 (4 overs)		Abdul Malik 62 (41); Noor Ahmad 1/26 (4 overs)

Amo Sharks won by 6 wickets
Kabul International Cricket Stadium, Kabul
Umpires: Muhammad Sabir and Ajmal Shamolzi
Player of the match: Sharafuddin Ashraf (Amo Sharks)

- Amo Sharks won the toss and elected to field.

16 August 2024
14:00
Scorecard

Mis Ainak Knights; 128/9 (20 overs)	v	Band-e-Amir Dragons; 113/9 (20 overs)
Naveed Obaid 51 (37); Nangialai Kharoti 3/15 (4 overs)		Sediqullah Atal 49 (46); Yama Arab 4/22 (4 overs)

Mis Ainak Knights won by 15 runs
Kabul International Cricket Stadium, Kabul
Umpires: Mahmood Kharoti and Bismillah Jan Shinwari
Player of the match: Yama Arab (Mis Ainak Knights)

- Mis Ainak Knights won the toss and elected to bat.

17 August 2024
09:00
Scorecard

Amo Sharks; 105 (18.3 overs)	v	Speenghar Tigers; 106/5 (10.4 overs)
Mohammad Ishaq 36 (25); Bilal Sami 3/8 (3.3 overs)		Hassan Eisakhil 36 (18); Sharafuddin Ashraf 2/24 (3 overs)

Speenghar Tigers won by 5 wickets
Kabul International Cricket Stadium
Umpires: Ahmad Shah Pakteen and Farooq Khan
Player of the match: Bilal Sami (Speenghar Tigers)

- Speenghar Tigers won the toss and elected to field.

17 August 2024
14:00
Scorecard

Boost Defenders; 167 (19.5 Overs)	v	Mis Ainak Knights; 171/2 (18.3 Overs)
Darwish Rasooli 67 (30); Abdul Rahman Rahmani 3/26 (3.5)		Wafiullah Tarakhil 65* (39); Naseer Khan Maroofkhil 1/34 (4)

Mis Ainak Knights won by 8 wickets
Kabul International Cricket Stadium, Kabul
Umpires: Izatullah Safi and Muhammad Sabir
Player of the match: Wafiullah Tarakhil (Mis Ainak Knights)

- Boost Defenders won the toss and elected to bat.

18 August 2024
09:00
Scorecard

Amo Sharks; 146/8 (20 overs)	v	Boost Defenders; 135/9 (20 overs)
Sharafuddin Ashraf 36* (20); Rahmat Shah 3/28 (4 overs)		Rahmat Shah 49 (45); Azmatullah Omarzai 4/37 (4 overs)

Amo Sharks won by 11 runs
Kabul International Cricket Stadium, Kabul
Umpires: Ahmed Shah Durrani and Bismillah Jan Shinwari
Player of the match: Sharafuddin Ashraf (Amo Sharks)

- Boost Defenders won the toss and elected to field first.

18 August 2024
14:00
Scorecard

Band-e-Amir Dragons; 147 (19.5 overs)	v	Speenghar Tigers; 134/8 (20 overs)
Sediqullah Atal 89 (62); Zahir Khan 4/18 (3.5 overs)		Hassan Eisakhil 45 (39); Amir Hamza 3/24 (4 overs)

Band-e-Amir Dragons won by 13 runs
Kabul International Cricket Stadium, Kabul
Umpires: Mahmood Kharoti and Ajmal Shamolzi
Player of the match: Sediqullah Atal (Band-e-Amir Dragons)

- Band-e-Amir Dragons won the toss and elected to bat.
- Abdullah Ahmadzai (Band-e-Amir Dragons) made his T20 debut.

19 August 2024
09:00
Scorecard

Amo Sharks; 190/5 (20 overs)	v	Mis Ainak Knights; 165/8 (20 overs)
Shahidullah 49 (23); Zia-ur-Rehman 2/29 (4 overs)		Ibrahim Zadran 52 (43); Azmatullah Omarzai 3/41 (4 overs)

Mis Ainak Knights won by 24 runs
Kabul International Cricket Stadium, Kabul
Umpires: Farooq Khan and Muhammad Sabir
Player of the match: Shahidullah (Amo Sharks)

- Mis Ainak Knights won the toss and elected to field.

19 August 2024
14:00
Scorecard

Speenghar Tigers; 192/6 (20 overs)	v	Boost Defenders; 193/5 (18.5 overs)
Hassan Eisakhil 63 (42); Naseer Khan Maroofkhil 2/51 (4 overs)		Rahmat Shah 48 (28); Rashid Khan 2/27 (4 overs)

Boost Defenders won by 5 wickets
Kabul International Cricket Stadium, Kabul
Umpires: Ahmad Shah Pakteen and Izatullah Safi
Player of the match: Rahmat Shah (Boost Defenders)

- Speenghar Tigers won the toss and elected to bat.

20 August 2024
09:00
Scorecard

Band-e-Amir Dragons; 139/4 (20 overs)	v	Mis Ainak Knights; 97 (18.1 overs)
Hashmatullah Shahidi 51* (55); Nasim Mangal 2/24 (4 overs)		Rahmanullah 32 (30); Allah Mohammad Ghazanfar 4/12 (4 overs)

Band-e-Amir Dragons won by 42 runs
Kabul International Cricket Stadium, Kabul
Umpires: Mahmood Kharoti and Ajmal Shamolzi
Player of the match: Allah Mohammad Ghazanfar (Band-e-Amir Dragons)

- Band-e-Amir Dragons won the toss and elected to bat.

20 August 2024
14:00
Scorecard

Amo Sharks; 166/3 (17 overs)	v	Speenghar Tigers; 112/9 (12 overs)
Zubaid Akbari 82 (45); Arab Gul 1/18 (3 overs)		Rashid Khan 53 (26); Fazalhaq Farooqi 5/13 (3 overs)

Amo Sharks won by 26 runs (DLS method)
Kabul International Cricket Stadium, Kabul
Umpires: Ahmed Shah Durrani and Bismillah Jan Shinwari
Player of the match: Fazalhaq Farooqi (Amo Sharks)

- Amo Sharks won the toss and elected to bat.
- The match was reduced to 17 overs per side due to rain.
- Speenghar Tigers were set a revised target of 139 runs from 12 overs due to rain.

21 August 2024
09:00
Scorecard

Boost Defenders; 204/6 (20 overs)	v	Mis Ainak Knights; 120 (18.2 overs)
Darwish Rasooli 76* (37); Khalil Gurbaz 3/34 (4 overs)		Wafiullah Tarakhil 33 (31); Naseer Khan Maroofkhil 2/19 (4 overs)

Boost Defenders won by 82 runs
Kabul International Cricket Stadium, Kabul
Umpires: Farooq Khan and Mahmood Kharoti
Player of the match: Darwish Rasooli (Boost Defenders)

- Mis Ainak Knights won the toss and elected to field.

21 August 2024
14:00
Scorecard

Amo Sharks; 201/5 (20 overs)	v	Band-e-Amir Dragons; 182 (19.2 overs)
Abdul Malik 73 (56); Nangialai Kharoti 2/25 (4 overs)		Karim Janat 76 (39); Fazalhaq Farooqi 5/18 (4 overs)

Amo Sharks won by 19 runs
Kabul International Cricket Stadium, Kabul
Umpires: Ahmad Shah Pakteen and Izatullah Safi
Player of the match: Fazalhaq Farooqi (Amo Sharks)

- Amo Sharks won the toss and elected to bat.

22 August 2024
09:00
Scorecard

Mis Ainak Knights; 125/9 (20 overs)	v	Speenghar Tigers; 130/5 (16.5 overs)
Afsar Zazai 54 (45); Ismat Alam 3/24 (4 overs)		Ikram Alikhil 38* (17); Nasim Mangal 2/18 (3 overs)

Speenghar Tigers won by 5 wickets
Kabul International Cricket Stadium, Kabul
Umpires: Bismillah Jan Shinwari and Izatullah Safi
Player of the match: Ismat Alam (Speenghar Tigers)

- Speenghar Tigers won the toss and elected to field.

22 August 2024
14:00
Scorecard

Band-e-Amir Dragons; 160/5 (20 overs)	v	Boost Defenders; 148/9 (20 overs)
Hashmatullah Shahidi 71 (50); Fareed Ahmad 2/33 (4 overs)		Rahmat Shah 39 (37); Allah Mohammad Ghazanfar 3/25 (4 overs)

Band-e-Amir Dragons won by 12 runs
Kabul International Cricket Stadium, Kabul
Umpires: Farooq Khan and Mahmood Kharoti
Player of the match: Hashmatullah Shahidi (Band-e-Amir Dragons)

- Boost Defenders won the toss and elected to field.

== Final ==
24 August 2024
13:15
Scorecard

Band-e-Amir Dragons; 178/1 (20 overs)	v	Amo Sharks; 179/3 (18.5 overs)
Hashmatullah Shahidi 78* (53)		Shahidullah 59* (38); Allah Mohammad Ghazanfar 1/28 (4 overs)

Amo Sharks won by 7 wickets
Kabul International Cricket Stadium, Kabul
Umpires: Ahmad Shah Pakteen and Izatullah Safi
Player of the match: Zubaid Akbari (Amo Sharks)

- Band-e-Amir Dragons won the toss and elected bat.
- Sediqullah Atal (Band-e-Amir Dragons) scored his 1,000th run in T20s.
