= 2026 Ghazi Amanullah Khan Regional One Day Tournament =

9th editions of Ghazi Amanullah Khan Regional One Day Tournament

- Dates: 17 May – 4 June 2026
- Administrator: Afghanistan Cricket Board
- Cricket format: List A
- Tournament format(s): Double round-robin and final
- Participants: 5
- Matches: 14

The 2026 Ghazi Amanullah Khan Regional One Day Tournament, also known as e& List A Tournament 2026 for sponsorship reasons, is the 9th edition of the Ghazi Amanullah Khan Regional One Day Tournament, a List A cricket competition in Afghanistan. The tournament began on 17 May 2026, and the final is scheduled to be held on 4 June 2026 at the Ghazi Amanullah Khan International Cricket Stadium.

Mis Ainak Region is the defending champion, having won the previous season.

== Team standings ==
=== Points table ===
Pos	Team	Pld	W	L	NR	Pts	NRR
1	Amo Region	6	3	2	1	7	0.680
2	Boost Region	6	3	3	0	6	0.287
3	Speenghar Region	5	3	2	0	6	−0.157
4	Band-e-Amir Region	6	2	3	1	5	−0.821
5	Mis Ainak Region	5	2	3	0	4	−0.127

Updated to match(es) played on 1 June 2026. Source: ESPNcricinfo

=== League progression ===
Team	Group matches						Play-offs
Team	1	2	3	4	5	6	Final
Amo Region	2	2	2	3	5	7	
Band-e-Amir Region	2	4	4	5	5	5	
Boost Region	0	2	4	4	6	6	
Mis Ainak Region	0	0	2	4	4		
Speenghar Region	0	2	4	4	6		

Win	Loss	Tie	No result	Eliminated

- Note: The total points at the end of each group match are listed.
- Note: Click on the points or results to see the match summary.

== Round-robin ==
Match 1
17 May 2026
09:00
Scorecard

Band-e-Amir Region; 330/9 (50 overs)	v	Mis Ainak Region; 324/9 (50 overs)
Ijaz Ahmad Ahmadzai 75 (38); Mohammad Younus 3/73 (9 overs)		Rahmanullah 109 (94); Khalil Ahmed 2/50 (10 overs)

Band-e-Amir Region won by 6 runs
Ghazi Amanullah International Cricket Stadium, Nangarhar Province
Umpires: Ahmed Shah Durrani and Farooq Khan

- Band-e-Amir Region won the toss and elected to bat.

Match 2
18 May 2026
09:00
Scorecard

Boost Region; 159 (34.4 overs)	v	Amo Region; 160/2 (29.5 overs)
Najibullah Zadran 68 (59); Nabi Mia Khail 3/18 (4 overs)		Abdul Malik 75 (75); Karim Janat 2/31 (6.5 overs)

Amo Region won by 8 wickets
Ghazi Amanullah International Cricket Stadium, Nangarhar Province
Umpires: Mahmood Kharoti and Izatullah Safi

- Amo Region won the toss and elected to field.
- Nabi Mia Khail and Faisal Shinozada (Amo Region) both made their List A debut.

Match 3
19 May 2026
09:00
Scorecard

Band-e-Amir Region; 277/4 (50 overs)	v	Speenghar Region; 201 (42.2 overs)
Ijaz Ahmad Ahmadzai 79* (52); Yamin Ahmadzai 2/58 (8 overs)		Bahir Shah 81 (93); Qais Ahmad 3/33 (7.2 overs)

Band-e-Amir Region won by 76 runs
Ghazi Amanullah International Cricket Stadium, Nangarhar Province
Umpires: Farooq Khan and Ajmal Shamalzai
Player of the match: Ijaz Ahmad Ahmadzai (Band-e-Amir Region)

- Speeghar Region won the toss and elected to field.
- Usman Noori (Speenghar Region) made his List A debut.

Match 4
20 May 2026
09:00
Scorecard

Boost Region; 277/8 (50 overs)	v	Mis Ainak Region; 119/7 (22.4 overs)
Naseerullah 105 (136); Bilal Sami 4/73 (10 overs)		Asghar Atal 33 (54); Khalil Gurbaz 4/20 (3 overs)

Boost Region won by 36 runs (DLS method)
Ghazi Amanullah International Cricket Stadium, Nangarhar Province
Umpires: Muhammad Sabir and Izatullah Safi
Player of the match: Naseerullah (Boost Region)

- Mis Ainak Region won the toss and elected to field.
- When play was halted Mis Ainak Region needed to have scored 156 runs to win.
- Naseerullah (Boost Region) scored his maiden century in List A cricket.

Match 5
21 May 2026
09:00
Scorecard

Amo Region; 176 (49.3 overs)	v	Speenghar Region; 84/2 (21 overs)
Sharafuddin Ashraf 54 (74); Yamin Ahmadzai 6/33 (10 overs)		Usman Noori 39* (61); Mohammad Saleem 1/32 (5 overs)

Speenghar Region won by 24 runs (DLS method)
Ghazi Amanullah International Cricket Stadium, Nangarhar Province
Umpires: Mahmood Kharoti and Ajmal Shamalzai
Player of the match: Yamin Ahmadzai (Speenghar Region)

- Amo Region won the toss and elected to bat.
- When play was halted Speenghar Region needed to have scored 61 runs to win.

Match 6
22 May 2026
09:00
Scorecard

Boost Region; 281/5 (47 overs)	v	Band-e-Amir Region; 95 (22.5 overs)
Afsar Zazai 121 (120); Farmanullah 2/40 (8 overs)		Hassan Eisakhil 33 (30); Khalil Gurbaz 5/21 (5.5 overs)

Boost Region won by 186 runs
Ghazi Amanullah International Cricket Stadium, Nangarhar Province
Umpires: Ahmed Shah Durrani and Muhammad Sabir
Player of the match: Afsar Zazai (Band-e-Amir Region)

- Band-e-Amir Region won the toss and elected to field.
- The match was reduced to 47 overs per side due to rain.

Match 7
23 May 2026
09:00
Scorecard

Mis Ainak Region; 297/8 (50 overs)	v	Amo Region; 262/9 (50 overs)
Khalid Taniwal 100 (110); Gulbadin Naib 3/49 (10 overs)		Gulbadin Naib 70 (64); Shahidullah 2/30 (8 overs)

Ghazi Amanullah International Cricket Stadium, Nangarhar Province
Umpires: Farooq Khan and Mahmood Kharoti
Player of the match: Khalid Taniwal (Mis Ainak Region)

- Amo Region won the toss and elected to field.
- Keramatullah and Najibullah Alokozay (Amo Region) both made their List A debuts.

Match 8
24 May 2026
09:00
Scorecard

Boost Region; 235/8 (50 overs)	v	Speenghar Region; 236/4 (40.1 overs)
Afsar Zazai 100 (116); Mohammad Nabi 2/34 (10 overs)		Zubairullah Akbari 73 (82); Karim Janat 2/38 (7 overs)

Speenghar Region won by 6 wickets
Ghazi Amanullah International Cricket Stadium, Nangarhar Province
Umpires: Ahmed Shah Durrani and Izatullah Safi
Player of the match: Zubairullah Akbari (Speenghar Region)

- Boost Region won the toss and elected to bat.

Match 9
25 May 2026
09:00
Scorecard

Amo Region	v	Band-e-Amir Region

Match abandoned
Ghazi Amanullah International Cricket Stadium, Nangarhar Province
Umpires: Muhammad Sabir and Ajmal Shamalzai

- No toss.
- No play was possible due to rain.

Match 10
30 May 2026
09:00
Scorecard

Speenghar Region; 252 (48.4 overs)	v	Mis Ainak Region; 253/6 (43.4 overs)
Darwish Rasooli 83 (83); Mohammad Gul Alizai 6/46 (10 overs)		Khalid Taniwal 130 (132); Zahir Khan 2/60 (9 overs)

Mis Ainak Region won by 4 wickets
Ghazi Amanullah International Cricket Stadium, Nangarhar Province
Umpires: Ihsanullah Danish and Ahmed Shah Durrani
Player of the match: Mohammad Gul Alizai (Mis Ainak Region)

- Abdul Hamid Hotak, Jalat Khan (Speenghar Region) and Majboor Kharoti (Mis Ainak Region) all made their List A debuts.
- Mohammad Gul Alizai (Mis Ainak Region) took his maiden five-wicket haul in List A cricket.

Match 11
30 May 2026
09:00
Scorecard

Band-e-Amir Region; 334/6 (50 overs)	v	Boost Region; 335/8 (49.1 overs)
Farmanullah 92* (74); Mohammadullah 2/41 (8 overs)		Najibullah Zadran 159 (119); Samiullah 4/61 (10 overs)

Boost Region won by 2 wickets
Najibullah Tarakai Cricket Ground, Nangarhar Province
Umpires: Nasir Khan and Izatullah Safi
Player of the match: Najibullah Zadran (Boost Region)

- Band-e-Amir Region won the toss and elected to bat.

Match 12
31 May 2026
09:00
Scorecard

Boost Region; 222 (48.4 overs)	v	Speenghar Region; 223/7 (49.5 overs)
Karim Janat 85 (97); Yamin Ahmadzai 4/28 (8 overs)		Darwish Rasooli 87 (107); Khalil Gurbaz 3/51 (10 overs)

Speenghar Region won by 3 wickets
Ghazi Amanullah International Cricket Stadium, Nangarhar Province
Umpires: Mahmood Kharoti and Ajmal Shamalzai
Player of the match: Darwish Rasooli (Speenghar Region)

- Speenghar Region won the toss and elected to field.

Match 13
31 May 2026
09:00
Scorecard

Amo Region; 319/4 (50 overs)	v	Mis Ainak Region; 315/9 (50 overs)
Imran Mir 117 (123); Mohibullah Zurmati 2/52 (10 overs)		Allah Noor 109 (98); Jawed Sayedi 3/37 (50 overs)

Amo Region won by 4 runs
Najibullah Tarakai Cricket Ground, Nangarhar Province
Umpires: Farooq Khan and Muhammad Sabir
Player of the match: Imran Mir (Amo Region)

- Mis Ainak Region won the toss and elected to field.
- Ikramullah Momand (Amo Region) made his List A debut.
- Allah Noor (Mis Ainak Region) scored his maiden century in List A cricket.

Match 14
1 July 2026
09:00
Scorecard

Amo Region; 308/5 (50 overs)	v	Band-e-Amir Region; 215 (41.5 overs)
Imran Mir 161 (144); Samiullah 2/64 (10 overs)		Jawid Ahmadzai 51 (47); Fazalhaq Farooqi 2/23 (7 overs)

Amo Region won by 93 runs
Ghazi Amanullah International Cricket Stadium, Nangarhar Province
Umpires: Ihsanullah Danish and Ahmed Shah Durrani
Player of the match: Imran Mir (Amo Region)

- Band-e-Amir Region won the toss and elected to field.

Match 15
2 July 2026
09:00
Scorecard

Mis Ainak Region	v	Speenghar Region

Najibullah Tarakai Cricket Ground, Nangarhar Province

== Final ==
Final
May
09:00
Scorecard

TBD	v	TBD

Ghazi Amanullah International Cricket Stadium, Nangarhar Province
