= 2025 Champions Trophy squads =

The 2025 ICC Champions Trophy was the ninth edition of the ICC Champions Trophy. It was hosted by Pakistan and United Arab Emirates from 19 February to 9 March 2025.

The following squads were announced for the tournament.

== Group A ==
=== Bangladesh ===
Coach: (Cricket West Indies) Phil Simmons

No.	Player	Date of birth	ODIs	Batting	Bowling style	List A team
99	Najmul Hossain Shanto (c)	25 August 1998 (aged 26)	47	Left	Right arm off break	(Bangladesh) Rajshahi Division
10	Nasum Ahmed	5 December 1994 (aged 30)	18	Left	Slow left-arm orthodox	(Bangladesh) Sylhet Division
3	Taskin Ahmed	3 April 1995 (aged 29)	77	Left	Right arm fast	(Bangladesh) Dhaka Metropolis
51	Jaker Ali (wk)	22 February 1998 (aged 26)	5	Right	–	(Bangladesh) Sylhet Division
63	Parvez Hossain Emon (wk)	12 June 2002 (aged 22)	0	Left	–	(Bangladesh) Chattogram Division
31	Tanzid Hasan	1 December 2000 (aged 24)	21	Left	–	(Bangladesh) Rajshahi Division
22	Rishad Hossain	15 July 2002 (aged 22)	7	Right	Right arm leg break	(Bangladesh) Rangpur Division
77	Towhid Hridoy	4 December 2000 (aged 24)	33	Right	Right arm off break	(Bangladesh) Rajshahi Division
30	Mahmudullah	4 February 1986 (aged 39)	238	Right	Right arm off break	(Bangladesh) Dhaka Division
53	Mehidy Hasan Miraz (vc)	25 October 1997 (aged 27)	103	Right	Right arm off break	(Bangladesh) Khulna Division
15	Mushfiqur Rahim (wk)	9 June 1987 (aged 37)	272	Right	–	(Bangladesh) Rajshahi Division
90	Mustafizur Rahman	6 September 1995 (aged 29)	107	Left	Left arm fast medium	(Bangladesh) Khulna Division
45	Nahid Rana	2 October 2002 (aged 22)	3	Right	Right arm fast	(Bangladesh) Rajshahi Division
41	Tanzim Hasan Sakib	20 December 2002 (aged 22)	9	Right	Right arm fast medium	(Bangladesh) Sylhet Division
59	Soumya Sarkar	25 February 1993 (aged 31)	75	Left	Right arm medium fast	(Bangladesh) Khulna Division

Nazmul Hossain Shanto was named captain as Bangladesh unveiled their squad for the ICC Men's Champions Trophy 2025. A major name missing from the lineup was former skipper and veteran all-rounder, Shakib Al Hasan. The 37-year-old had been suspended from bowling in competitions under the jurisdiction of the England and Wales Cricket Board (ECB) based on the outcome of an independent re-assessment conducted at Sri Ramachandra Centre for Sports Science in Chennai, India. Although he was eligible to play solely as a batter, Bangladesh had opted not to include him in the squad. The squad also missed out on the services of Tamim Iqbal, who recently called time on his international career and was among the leading run-getters in the previous edition of the tournament as Bangladesh made it to the semi-finals. Among the senior names, wicketkeeper-batter Mushfiqur Rahim and all-rounder Mahmudullah had cemented their place. A major highlight had been the maiden ODI call-up of Parvez Hossai Emon, who only had seven T20I outings under his belt. Prodigious quick Nahid Rana, who made his debut in the format in the recent series against the West Indies, had also been entrusted.

=== India ===
Coach: (India) Gautam Gambhir

No.	Player	Date of birth	ODIs	Batting	Bowling style	List A team
45	Rohit Sharma (c)	30 April 1987 (aged 37)	266	Right	Right-arm off break	(India) Mumbai
77	Shubman Gill (vc)	8 September 1999 (aged 25)	48	Right	Right-arm off break	(India) Punjab
29	Varun Chakravarthy	29 August 1991 (aged 33)	1	Right	Right-arm leg break	(India) Tamil Nadu
96	Shreyas Iyer	6 December 1994 (aged 30)	63	Right	Right-arm leg spin	(India) Mumbai
8	Ravindra Jadeja	6 December 1988 (aged 36)	198	Left	Slow left arm orthodox	(India) Saurashtra
18	Virat Kohli	5 November 1988 (aged 36)	295	Right	Right-arm medium	(India) Delhi
33	Hardik Pandya	11 October 1993 (aged 31)	87	Right	Right-arm medium-fast	(India) Baroda
17	Rishabh Pant (wk)	4 October 1997 (aged 27)	31	Left	–	(India) Delhi
20	Axar Patel	20 January 1994 (aged 31)	61	Left	Slow left arm orthodox	(India) Gujarat
1	KL Rahul (wk)	18 April 1992 (aged 32)	78	Right	–	(India) Karnataka
22	Harshit Rana	22 December 2001 (aged 23)	2	Right	Right-arm fast-medium	(India) Delhi
11	Mohammed Shami	9 March 1990 (aged 34)	102	Right	Right-arm fast-medium	(India) Bengal
2	Arshdeep Singh	5 February 1999 (aged 26)	8	Left	Left-arm medium-fast	(India) Punjab
5	Washington Sundar	5 October 1999 (aged 25)	22	Left	Right-arm off spin	(India) Tamil Nadu
23	Kuldeep Yadav	14 December 1994 (aged 30)	107	Left	Left-arm wrist spin	(India) Uttar Pradesh
93	~~Jasprit Bumrah~~	6 December 1993 (aged 31)	89	Right	Right-arm medium-fast	(India) Gujarat

Jasprit Bumrah was ruled out of the squad due to a lower back injury sustained in January during the Border-Gavaskar Trophy. Later, Harshit Rana was named as his replacement. Rana had impressive performance in ODI series against England, scalping six wickets in his first three outings. Bumrah had also missed the ICC Men's T20 World Cup 2022 in Australia, making this the second ICC event the 31-year-old has had to miss with a back injury. India also included spinner Varun Chakaravarthy in the squad, replacing Yashasvi Jaiswal, who was originally part of the provisional team. Jaiswal had been named as a non-travelling substitute, alongside Mohammed Siraj and Shivam Dube.

=== New Zealand ===
Coach: (New Zealand) Gary Stead

No.	Player	Date of birth	ODIs	Batting	Bowling style	List A team
74	Mitchell Santner (c)	5 February 1992 (aged 33)	111	Left	Slow left-arm orthodox	(New Zealand) Northern Districts
4	Michael Bracewell	14 February 1991 (aged 34)	24	Left	Right-arm off spin	(New Zealand) Wellington
80	Mark Chapman	27 June 1994 (aged 30)	29	Left	Slow left-arm orthodox	(New Zealand) Auckland
88	Devon Conway (wk)	8 July 1991 (aged 33)	32	Left	–	(New Zealand) Wellington
27	Jacob Duffy	2 August 1994 (aged 30)	10	Right	Right-arm fast-medium	(New Zealand) Otago
21	Matt Henry	14 December 1991 (aged 33)	86	Right	Right-arm fast medium	(New Zealand) Canterbury
17	Kyle Jamieson	30 December 1994 (aged 30)	13	Right	Right-arm fast medium	(New Zealand) Canterbury
48	Tom Latham (wk)	2 April 1992 (aged 32)	150	Left	Right-arm medium	(New Zealand) Canterbury
75	Daryl Mitchell (vc)	20 May 1991 (aged 33)	43	Right	Right-arm medium	(New Zealand) Canterbury
2	William O'Rourke	6 August 2001 (aged 23)	7	Right	Right-arm fast	(New Zealand) Canterbury
23	Glenn Phillips (wk)	6 December 1996 (aged 28)	37	Right	Right-arm off spin	(New Zealand) Otago
8	Rachin Ravindra	18 November 1999 (aged 25)	29	Left	Slow left-arm orthodox	(New Zealand) Wellington
10	Nathan Smith	15 July 1998 (aged 26)	5	Right	Right-arm medium fast	(New Zealand) Wellington
22	Kane Williamson	8 August 1990 (aged 34)	166	Right	Right-arm off break	(New Zealand) Northern Districts
32	Will Young	22 November 1992 (aged 32)	38	Right	–	(New Zealand) Central Districts
69	~~Lockie Ferguson~~	13 June 1991 (aged 33)	65	Right	Right-arm fast	(New Zealand) Auckland
14	~~Ben Sears~~	11 February 1998 (aged 27)	2	Right	Right-arm medium fast	(New Zealand) Wellington

On 14 February, Ben Sears was ruled out of the tournament due to a hamstring injury and Jacob Duffy was added into the squad as an injury replacement. This was the first major ICC tournament leading the side for new white-ball skipper Mitchell Santner, after a successful stint in the ODI & T20I series at home against Sri Lanka. The pace trio of Will O’Rourke, Ben Sears and Nathan Smith all featured in the squad, to play their maiden senior ICC event. Captain Santner was the frontline spin option, leading all-rounders Michael Bracewell, Glenn Phillips and Rachin Ravindra all playing support. Senior figures Kane Williamson and Tom Latham lent valuable experience to the side. Santner, Williamson and Latham were all part of New Zealand's squad for the previous edition of the Champions Trophy in England and Wales in 2017. Williamson also featured at the 2013 edition in England. Matt Henry spearheaded the pace bowling attack, in his fifth ICC event having played a key role in the last two ICC ODI and T20I World Cups.

Lockie Ferguson missed the tournament due to an injury to his right foot and was replaced in the squad by fellow pacer Kyle Jamieson. On 18 February, the Event Technical Committee of the ICC Men’s Champions Trophy 2025 approved Jamieson as his replacement in the New Zealand squad.

=== Pakistan ===
Coach: (Pakistan) Aaqib Javed

No.	Player	Date of birth	ODIs	Batting	Bowling style	List A team
16	Mohammad Rizwan (c, wk)	1 June 1992 (aged 32)	85	Right	Right-arm medium	(Pakistan) Khyber Pakhtunkhwa
67	Salman Ali Agha (vc)	23 November 1993 (aged 31)	32	Right	Right-arm off break	(Pakistan) Southern Punjab
10	Shaheen Afridi	6 April 2000 (aged 24)	61	Left	Left-arm fast	(Pakistan) Balochistan
40	Abrar Ahmed	11 September 1998 (aged 26)	6	Right	Right-arm leg spin	(Pakistan) Sindh
41	Faheem Ashraf	16 January 1994 (aged 31)	34	Left	Right-arm medium	(Pakistan) Central Punjab
56	Babar Azam	15 October 1994 (aged 30)	125	Right	Right-arm off break	(Pakistan) Islamabad
82	Kamran Ghulam	10 October 1995 (aged 29)	11	Right	Slow left-arm orthodox	(Pakistan) Khyber Pakhtunkhwa
87	Mohammad Hasnain	5 April 2000 (aged 24)	15	Right	Right-arm fast	(Pakistan) Sindh
78	Usman Khan	10 May 1995 (aged 29)	0	Right	Right-arm off break	(Pakistan)
97	Haris Rauf	7 November 1993 (aged 31)	46	Right	Right-arm fast	(Pakistan) Balochistan
72	Khushdil Shah	7 February 1995 (aged 30)	12	Left	Slow left-arm orthodox	(Pakistan) Southern Punjab
71	Naseem Shah	15 February 2003 (aged 22)	22	Right	Right-arm fast	(Pakistan) Central Punjab
59	Saud Shakeel	5 September 1995 (aged 29)	16	Left	Slow left-arm orthodox	(Pakistan) Sindh
66	Tayyab Tahir	26 July 1993 (aged 31)	5	Right	Right-arm leg break	(Pakistan) Southern Punjab
26	Imam-ul-Haq	22 December 1995 (aged 29)	72	Left	Right-arm leg break	(Pakistan) Balochistan
39	~~Fakhar Zaman~~	10 April 1990 (aged 34)	84	Left	Slow left-arm orthodox	(Pakistan) Khyber Pakhtunkhwa

Pakistan announced their squad on 31 January 2025. Mohammad Rizwan lead the team, having done so since Babar Azam stepped down from the role after the ICC Men's Cricket World Cup in 2023. Rising star hitter Saim Ayub was a notable absentee, having sustained an ankle injury in Pakistan's New Year's Test in Cape Town, South Africa. Top-order batter Abdullah Shafique had also missed the cut, paving the way for Babar to secure one of the top-order roles. Veteran Fakhar Zaman was back in the mix, having played a monumental role in the 2017 Champions Trophy final. Also recalled were Faheem Ashraf, Khushdil Shah, and Saud Shakeel. Aaqib Javed continued his role as interim coach, stepping in after Gary Kirsten's departure last October.

Fakhar Zaman was ruled out of the tournament as he sustained an injury while fielding against New Zealand in the opening match and was replaced by Imam-ul-Haq. On 20 February, the Event Technical Committee of the ICC Men’s Champions Trophy 2025 approved Imam as his replacement in the Pakistan squad.

== Group B ==
=== Afghanistan ===
Coach: (England) Jonathan Trott

No.	Player	Date of birth	ODIs	Batting	Bowling style	List A team
50	Hashmatullah Shahidi (c)	4 November 1994 (aged 30)	87	Left	Right-arm off break	(Afghanistan) Band-e-Amir Region
56	Fareed Ahmad	10 August 1994 (aged 30)	19	Left	Left-arm fast-medium	(Afghanistan) Amo Region
15	Noor Ahmad	3 January 2005 (aged 20)	10	Right	Left-arm unorthodox spin	(Afghanistan) Mis Ainak Knights
46	Ikram Alikhil (wk)	29 September 2000 (aged 24)	31	Left	–	(Afghanistan) Speenghar Tigers
26	Sediqullah Atal	12 August 2001 (aged 23)	6	Left	–	(Afghanistan) Band-e-Amir Region
5	Fazalhaq Farooqi	22 September 2000 (aged 24)	39	Right	Left-arm fast-medium	(Afghanistan) Kabul Eagles
21	Rahmanullah Gurbaz (wk)	28 November 2001 (aged 23)	46	Right	–	(Afghanistan) Kabul Eagles
19	Rashid Khan	20 September 1998 (aged 26)	111	Right	Right-arm leg break	(Afghanistan) Speenghar Tigers
12	Nangialai Kharoti	25 April 2004 (aged 20)	7	Left	Slow left-arm orthodox	(Afghanistan) Kabul Eagles
7	Mohammad Nabi	1 January 1985 (aged 40)	170	Right	Right-arm off break	(Afghanistan) Band-e-Amir Dragons
14	Gulbadin Naib	4 June 1991 (aged 33)	86	Right	Right-arm medium-fast	(Afghanistan) Boost Defenders
9	Azmatullah Omarzai	24 March 2000 (aged 24)	36	Right	Right-arm medium-fast	(Afghanistan) Mis Ainak Knights
8	Rahmat Shah (vc)	6 July 1991 (aged 33)	120	Right	Right-arm leg break	(Afghanistan) Mis Ainak Knights
18	Ibrahim Zadran	12 December 2001 (aged 23)	33	Right	Right-arm medium-fast	(Afghanistan) Mis Ainak Knights
58	Naveed Zadran	7 March 2005 (aged 19)	4	Right	Right-arm medium	(Afghanistan) Mis Ainak Knights
70	~~Allah Mohammad Ghazanfar~~	20 March 2006 (aged 18)	11	Right	Right-arm off break	(Afghanistan) Mis Ainak Knights

Afghanistan announced their squad on 12 January 2025. Additionally, Darwish Rasooli and Bilal Sami were named as reserves. On 12 February, Allah Mohammad Ghazanfar was ruled out of the tournament due to back injury and Nangialai Kharoti was added in the squad as an injury replacement. It was a blow to Afghanistan's spin department that was already missing experienced spinner Mujeeb Ur Rahman.

=== Australia ===
Coach: (Australia) Andrew McDonald

No.	Player	Date of birth	ODIs	Batting	Bowling style	List A team
49	Steve Smith (c)	2 June 1989 (aged 35)	165	Right	Right-arm leg spin	(Australia) New South Wales
77	Sean Abbott	29 February 1992 (aged 32)	26	Right	Right-arm fast-medium	(Australia) New South Wales
4	Alex Carey (wk)	27 August 1991 (aged 33)	76	Left	–	South Australia
9	Cooper Connolly	22 August 2003 (aged 21)	3	Left	Slow left-arm orthodox	Western Australia
82	Ben Dwarshuis	23 June 1994 (aged 30)	2	Left	Left-arm fast-medium	(Australia) New South Wales
12	Nathan Ellis	22 September 1994 (aged 30)	8	Right	Right-arm fast medium	(Australia) Tasmania
23	Jake Fraser-McGurk	11 April 2002 (aged 22)	5	Right	Right-arm legbreak	(Australia) Victoria
20	Aaron Hardie	7 January 1999 (aged 26)	11	Right	Right-arm medium fast	Western Australia
62	Travis Head	29 December 1993 (aged 31)	69	Left	Right-arm off spin	South Australia
48	Josh Inglis (wk)	4 March 1995 (aged 29)	26	Right	–	Western Australia
45	Spencer Johnson	16 December 1995 (aged 29)	2	Left	Left-arm fast	South Australia
33	Marnus Labuschagne	22 June 1994 (aged 30)	59	Right	Right-arm medium fast, leg break	(Australia) Queensland
32	Glenn Maxwell	14 October 1988 (aged 36)	145	Right	Right-arm off spin	(Australia) Victoria
26	Tanveer Sangha	26 November 2001 (aged 23)	2	Right	Right-arm legbreak	(Australia) New South Wales
88	Adam Zampa	31 March 1992 (aged 32)	106	Right	Right-arm legbreak	South Australia
30	~~Pat Cummins (c)~~	8 May 1993 (aged 31)	90	Right	Right-arm fast	(Australia) New South Wales
38	~~Josh Hazlewood~~	8 January 1991 (aged 34)	91	Left	Right-arm fast medium	(Australia) New South Wales
8	~~Mitchell Marsh~~	20 October 1991 (aged 33)	93	Right	Right-arm medium	Western Australia
56	~~Mitchell Starc~~	30 January 1990 (aged 35)	127	Left	Left-arm fast	(Australia) New South Wales
17	~~Marcus Stoinis~~	16 August 1989 (aged 35)	71	Right	Right-arm fast medium	(Australia) Victoria
5	~~Matthew Short~~	8 November 1995 (aged 29)	11	Right	Right-arm off break	(Australia) Victoria

On 31 January, Mitchell Marsh was ruled out of the tournament due to back injury. On 6 February, Marcus Stoinis announced his retirement from ODIs and was thus ruled out of the tournament, while Pat Cummins and Josh Hazlewood were ruled out of the tournament due to ankle and hip injuries respectively. On 12 February, Mitchell Starc withdrew from the tournament due to personal reasons. It meant Australia were without all three of the key quicks that helped them to the ICC Men's Cricket World Cup title in 2023. Later, experienced batter Steve Smith was named as captain for the event with Cummins missing. Glenn Maxwell was the part-time spin option utilised alongside first-choice spinner Adam Zampa. Five new players, Sean Abbott, Ben Dwarshuis, Jake Fraser-McGurk, Spencer Johnson and Tanveer Sangha had been parachuted into Australia's Champions Trophy squad, for the tournament. Additionally, Cooper Connolly was named as a travelling reserve.

On 2 March 2025, Matthew Short was ruled out of the tournament due to calf injury which he suffered during their match against Afghanistan. He was replaced by Cooper Connolly. Connolly had thus far featured in six internationals for Australia, of which three had been ODIs. He's a left-handed batter, who bowls left-arm spin as well.

=== England ===
Coach: (New Zealand) Brendon McCullum

No.	Player	Date of birth	ODIs	Batting	Bowling style	List A team
63	Jos Buttler (c, wk)	8 September 1990 (aged 34)	184	Right	–	(England) Lancashire
53	Rehan Ahmed	13 August 2004 (aged 20)	6	Right	Right-arm leg break	(England) Leicestershire
22	Jofra Archer	1 April 1995 (aged 29)	28	Right	Right-arm fast	(England) Sussex
37	Gus Atkinson	19 January 1998 (aged 27)	11	Right	Right-arm fast medium	(England) Surrey
98	Tom Banton	11 November 1998 (aged 26)	7	Right	Right-arm off break	(England) Somerset
88	Harry Brook (vc)	22 February 1999 (aged 25)	23	Right	Right-arm medium	(England) Yorkshire
17	Ben Duckett	17 October 1994 (aged 30)	19	Left	–	(England) Nottinghamshire
23	Liam Livingstone	4 August 1993 (aged 31)	36	Right	Right-arm leg spin/off break	(England) Lancashire
25	Saqib Mahmood	25 February 1997 (aged 27)	12	Right	Right-arm fast medium	(England) Lancashire
75	Jamie Overton	10 April 1994 (aged 30)	3	Right	Right-arm fast	(England) Surrey
95	Adil Rashid	17 February 1988 (aged 37)	146	Right	Right-arm leg break	(England) Yorkshire
66	Joe Root	30 December 1990 (aged 34)	174	Right	Right-arm off break	(England) Yorkshire
61	Phil Salt (wk)	28 August 1996 (aged 28)	30	Right	–	(England) Lancashire
39	Jamie Smith (wk)	12 July 2000 (aged 24)	7	Right	–	(England) Surrey
33	Mark Wood	11 January 1990 (aged 35)	68	Right	Right-arm fast	(England) Durham
82	~~Jacob Bethell~~	23 October 2003 (aged 21)	9	Left	Slow left-arm orthodox	(England) Warwickshire
92	~~Brydon Carse~~	31 July 1995 (aged 29)	20	Right	Right-arm fast	(England) Durham

On 9 February, Jacob Bethell was ruled out from the tournament due to a hamstring injury. On 12 February, Tom Banton was added into the squad as Bethell's replacement. Returning to ODI side was experienced batter Joe Root, who last featured in the format in England's ICC Men's Cricket World Cup 2023 campaign. All-rounder Ben Stokes was not considered for selection as he was still recovering from a left harmstring injury picked up during England's third Test match against New Zealand earlier.

After their opening game, all-rounder Brydon Carse was ruled out of the remainder of the tournament due to a toe injury and was replaced by leg-spinner Rehan Ahmed. On 24 February, the Event Technical Committee of the ICC Men’s Champions Trophy 2025 approved Rehan as his replacement in the England squad.

=== South Africa ===
Coach: (South Africa) Rob Walter

No.	Player	Date of birth	ODIs	Batting	Bowling style	List A team
11	Temba Bavuma (c)	17 May 1990 (aged 34)	45	Right	Right-arm medium	(South Africa) Lions
37	Corbin Bosch	10 September 1994 (aged 30)	2	Right	Right-arm fast medium	(South Africa) Titans
33	Tony de Zorzi	28 August 1997 (aged 27)	12	Left	–	(South Africa) Western Province
70	Marco Jansen	1 May 2000 (aged 24)	26	Right	Left-arm fast	(South Africa) Warriors
45	Heinrich Klaasen (wk)	30 July 1991 (aged 33)	57	Right	–	(South Africa) Titans
16	Keshav Maharaj	7 February 1990 (aged 35)	44	Right	Slow left-arm orthodox	(South Africa) Dolphins
4	Aiden Markram (vc)	4 October 1994 (aged 30)	74	Right	Right-arm off break	(South Africa) Titans
10	David Miller	10 June 1989 (aged 35)	175	Left	–	(South Africa) Dolphins
24	Wiaan Mulder	19 February 1998 (aged 27)	21	Right	Right-arm medium	(South Africa) Lions
22	Lungi Ngidi	29 March 1996 (aged 28)	63	Right	Right-arm fast medium	(South Africa) Titans
25	Kagiso Rabada	25 May 1995 (aged 29)	103	Left	Right-arm fast	(South Africa) Lions
44	Ryan Rickelton (wk)	11 July 1996 (aged 28)	6	Left	–	(South Africa) Lions
26	Tabraiz Shamsi	18 February 1990 (aged 35)	54	Right	Left-arm unorthodox spin	(South Africa) Titans
30	Tristan Stubbs	14 August 2000 (aged 24)	8	Right	Right-arm off break	(South Africa) Warriors
72	Rassie van der Dussen	7 February 1989 (aged 36)	68	Right	Right-arm leg break	(South Africa) Lions
20	~~Anrich Nortje~~	16 November 1993 (aged 31)	22	Right	Right-arm fast	(South Africa) Warriors

On 15 January, Anrich Nortje was ruled out of the tournament due to a back injury. On 9 February, 30-year-old Corbin Bosch was announced as the injury replacement for Nortje. He had played just one ODI and a Test so far. Additionally, Kwena Maphaka was named as the travelling reserve.
