= 2025 Ghazi Amanullah Khan Regional One Day Tournament =

8th editions of Ghazi Amanullah Khan Regional One Day Tournament

2025 List A Tournament
- Dates: 20 August – 6 September 2025
- Administrator: Afghanistan Cricket Board
- Cricket format: List A
- Tournament format(s): Double round-robin and final
- Champions: Mis Ainak Region (4th title)
- Runners-up: Band-e-Amir Region
- Participants: 5
- Matches: 16
- Most runs: Rahmat Shah (Boost Region) (424)
- Most wickets: Zahir Khan (Mis Ainak Region) (20)

The 2025 Ghazi Amanullah Khan Regional One Day Tournament, also known as X-Bull List A Tournament 2025 for sponsorship reasons, was the 8th edition of the Ghazi Amanullah Khan Regional One Day Tournament, a List A cricket competition in Afghanistan. The tournament began on 20 August 2025, and the final was held on 6 September 2025 at the Khost Cricket Stadium.

Hindukush Strikers were the defending champions. Mis Ainak Region won their 4th title of the Ghazi Amanullah Khan Regional One Day Tournament.

== Team standings ==
=== Points table ===
Pos	Team	Pld	W	L	NR	Pts	NRR	Qualification
1	Mis Ainak Region	6	4	2	0	8	0.808	Advanced to final
2	Band-e-Amir Region	6	4	2	0	8	−0.228	Advanced to final
3	Boost Region	6	3	3	0	6	0.045	
4	Speenghar Region	6	3	3	0	6	0.032	
5	Amo Region	6	1	5	0	2	−0.705	

Source: ESPNcricinfo

=== League progression ===
Team	Group matches					
Team	1	2	3	4	5	6
Amo Region	0	0	0	0	0	2
Band-e-Amir Region	2	4	4	6	8	8
Boost Region	0	2	2	4	6	6
Mis Ainak Region	2	2	4	6	8	8
Speenghar Region	2	2	4	4	4	6

Win	Loss	Tie	No result	Eliminated

- Note: The total points at the end of each group match are listed.
- Note: Click on the points or results to see the match summary.

== Round-robin ==
Match 1
20 August 2025
09:00
Scorecard

Speenghar Region; 312/3 (50 overs)	v	Amo Region; 251 (47.2 overs)
Bahir Shah 130* (89); Babar Khan 1/38 (8 overs)		Abdil Malik 101 (120); Qais Ahmad 4/46 (9.2 overs)

Speenghar Region won by 61 runs
Khost Cricket Ground, Khost
Umpires: Mahmood Kharoti and Ajmal Shamolzi
Player of the match: Bahir Shah (Speenghar Region)

- Amo Region won the toss and elected to field.
- Abdul Zahoor Lali and Azim Zadran (Speenghar Region) both made their List A debuts.
- Qais Ahmad (Speenghar Region) took his 50th wicket in List A cricket.

Match 2
21 August 2025
09:00
Scorecard

Mis Ainak Region; 305/9 (50 overs)	v	Boost Region; 302 (50 overs)
Naveed Obaid 112 (105); Ijaz Ul Haq 2/52 (10 overs)		Rahmat Shah 83 (91); Abdullah Tarakhail 3/52 (10 overs)

Mis Ainak Region won by 3 runs
Khost Cricket Ground, Khost
Umpires: Ahmed Shah Durrani and Farooq Khan
Player of the match: Naveed Obaid (Mis Ainak Region)

- Boost Region won the toss and elected to field.
- Hassan Eisakhil, Lutfullah Mohammadi (Mis Ainak Region) and Ijaz Ul Haq (Boost Region) all made their List A debuts.
- Naveed Obaid (Mis Ainak Region) scored his maiden century in List A cricket.

Match 3
22 August 2025
09:00
Scorecard

Speenghar Region; 203 (41.4 overs)	v	Band-e-Amir Region; 207/5 (46.1 overs)
Zubaid Akbari 74 (66); Khalil Gurbaz 6/37 (9 overs)		Farmanullah 78* (71); Aftab Akam 2/32 (8 overs)

Band-e-Amir Region won by 5 wickets
Khost Cricket Ground, Khost
Umpires: Mahmood Kharoti and Izatullah Safi
Player of the match: Khalil Gurbaz (Band-e-Amir Region)

- Band-e-Amir Region won the toss and elected to field.
- Noor ul Rahman (Band-e-Amir Region) made his List A debut.

Match 4
23 August 2025
09:00
Scorecard

Boost Region; 248/9 (50 overs)	v	Amo Region; 204 (46.1 overs)
Rahmat Shah 52 (56); Yamin Ahmadzai 5/47 (10 overs)		Samiullah Shinwari 61 (76); Mohibullah Hamraz 3/54 (9.1 overs)

Boost Region won by 44 runs
Khost Cricket Ground, Khost
Umpires: Muhammad Sabir and Ajmal Shamolzi
Player of the match: Sayed Shirzad (Boost Region)

- Amo Region won the toss and elected to field.
- Kamal Khan (Amo Region) and Mohibullah Hamraz (Boost Region) both made their List A debuts.

Match 5
24 August 2025
09:00
Scorecard

Mis Ainak Region; 301/8 (50 overs)	v	Band-e-Amir Region; 304/4 (48.5 overs)
Shahidullah 116* (101); Nijat Masood 3/44 (10 overs)		Hashmatullah Shahidi 146* (149); Zahir Khan 2/46 (10 overs)

Band-e-Amir Region won by 6 wickets
Khost Cricket Ground, Khost
Umpires: Farooq Khan and Izatullah Safi
Player of the match: Hashmatullah Shahidi (Band-e-Amir Region)

- Mis Ainak Region won the toss and elected to bat.
- Mohammad Younus (Mis Ainak Region) made his List A debut.

Match 6
25 August 2025
09:00
Scorecard

Speenghar Region; 309/2 (50 overs)	v	Boost Region; 243/7 (50 overs)
Barakzai Nasari 139* (163); Ijaz Ul Haq 2/64 (10 overs)		Ijaz Ul Haq 53* (51); Mohammadullah 2/41 (10 overs)

Speenghar Region won by 66 runs
Khost Cricket Ground, Khost
Umpires: Ahmed Shah Durrani and Mahmood Kharoti
Player of the match: Barakzai Nasari (Speenghar Region)

- Boost Region won the toss and elected to field.
- Hamza Khan (Boost Region) made his List A debut.
- Barakzai Nasari (Speenghar Region) scored his maiden century in List A cricket.

Match 7
26 August 2025
09:00
Scorecard

Mis Ainak Region; 260 (48.3 overs)	v	Amo Region; 233 (46 overs)
Mohammad Younus 78 (70); Azim Zadran 3/45 (10 overs)		Mohammad Shahzad 65 (75); Mohammad Dawood 3/35 (8 overs)

Mis Ainak Region won by 27 runs
Khost Cricket Ground, Khost
Umpires: Farooq Khan and Muhammad Sabir
Player of the match: Mohammad Younus (Mis Ainak Region)

- Amo Region won the toss and elected to field.
- Mohammad Dawood (Mis Ainak Region) and Kamran Sakhi (Amo Region) both made their List A debuts.
- Abdul Malik (Amo Region) scored his 2,000th run in List A cricket.

Match 8
27 August 2025
09:00
Scorecard

Boost Region; 311 (49.4 overs)	v	Band-e-Amir Region; 264/8 (45.2 overs)
Riaz Hassan 86 (114); Shams Ur Rahman 2/42 (10 overs)		Shams Ur Rahman 56 (37); Ijaz Ul Haq 2/40 (9 overs)

Boost Region won by 21 runs (DLS method)
Khost Cricket Ground, Khost
Umpires: Ihsanullah Danish and Izatullah Safi
Player of the match: Riaz Hassan (Boost Region)

- Boost Region won the toss and elected to bat.
- The play was stopped at 45.2 overs during second innings.
- Shir Khan (Band-e-Amir Region) and Qamar Shams (Boost Region) both made their List A debuts.
- Hazratullah Zazai (Boost Region) scored his 1,000th run in List A cricket.
- Band-e-Amir Region were set a revised target of 286 runs from 45.2 overs due to rain.

Match 9
28 August 2025
09:00
Scorecard

Speenghar Region; 158 (32.4 overs)	v	Mis Ainak Region; 159/4 (26.3 overs)
Barakzai Nasari 59 (63); Zahir Khan 4/27 (6.4 overs)		Naveed Obaid 45 (30); Mohammad Ibrahim 3/39 (7 overs)

Mis Ainak Region won by 6 wickets
Khost Cricket Ground, Khost
Umpires: Ahmed Shah Durrani and Nasir Khan
Player of the match: Zahir Khan (Mis Ainak Region)

- Speenghar Region won the toss and elected to field.

Match 10
30 August 2025
09:00
Scorecard

Amo Region; 177/9 (40 overs)	v	Band-e-Amir Region; 180/6 (29.3 overs)
Samiullah Shinwari 27 (33); Faridoon Dawoodzai 2/28 (8 overs)		Ijaz Ahmad Ahmadzai 43 (31); Bilal Aftab 2/34 (6.4 overs)

Band-e-Amir Region won by 4 wickets
Khost Cricket Ground, Khost
Umpires: Muhammad Sabir and Ajmal Shamolzi
Player of the match: Farmanullah (Band-e-Amir Region)

- Band-e-Amir Region won the toss and elected to field.
- The match was reduced to 40 overs per side due to rain.
- Bilal Aftab (Amo Region) made his List A debut.

Match 11
31 August 2025
09:00
Scorecard

Boost Region; 284/7 (50 overs)	v	Speenghar Region; 250 (48.3 overs)
Bilal Ahmad 67 (62); Bilal Sami 2/44 (10 overs)		Ikram Alikhil 100 (115); Qamar Shams 2/38 (10 overs)

Boost Region won by 34 runs
Khost Cricket Ground, Khost
Umpires: Farooq Khan and Ajmal Shamolzi
Player of the match: Nasir Jamal (Boost Region)

- Boost Region won the toss and elected to field.
- Ikram Alikhil (Speenghar Region) scored his first century in List A cricket.

Match 12
1 September 2025
09:00
Scorecard

Mis Ainak Region; 349/7 (50 overs)	v	Amo Region; 207 (39.2 overs)
Khalid Taniwal 113 (104); Bilal Aftab 3/54 (9 overs)		Imran Mir 47 (45); Zahir Khan 5/34 (9.2 overs)

Mis Ainak Region won by 142 runs
Khost Cricket Ground, Khost
Umpires: Ahmed Shah Durrani and Mahmood Kharoti
Player of the match: Khalid Taniwal (Mis Ainak Region)

- Amo Region won the toss and elected to field.
- Mobin Bakhtyar (Mis Ainak Region) made his List A debut.
- Khalid Taniwal (Mis Ainak Region) scored his first century in List A cricket.

Match 13
2 September 2025
09:00
Scorecard

Boost Region; 268 (48.4 overs)	v	Band-e-Amir Region; 272/7 (47.4 overs)
Rahmat Shah 133 (144); Faridoon Dawoodzai 3/52 (9.4 overs)		Ijaz Ahmad Ahmadzai 117 (80); Ziaur Rahman 4/45 (10 overs)

Band-e-Amir Region won by 3 wickets
Khost Cricket Ground, Khost
Umpires: Farooq Khan and Muhammad Sabir
Player of the match: Ijaz Ahmad Ahmadzai (Band-e-Amir Region)

- Boost Region won the toss and elected to bat.
- Rahmatullah Farooqi (Band-e-Amir Region) made his List A debut.
- Ijaz Ahmad Ahmadzai (Band-e-Amir Region) scored his first century in List A cricket.

Match 14
3 September 2025
09:00
Scorecard

Mis Ainak Region; 210 (47.3 overs)	v	Speenghar Region; 214/4 (39.2 overs)
Mobin Bakhtyar 60 (75); Mohammad Ibrahim 4/30 (8.3 overs)		Bahir Shah 59* (59); Zahir Khan 4/38 (9 overs)

Speenghar Region won by 6 wickets
Khost Cricket Ground, Khost
Umpires: Mahmood Kharoti and Ajmal Shamolzi
Player of the match: Mohammad Ibrahim (Speenghar Region)

- Mis Ainak Region won the toss and elected to bat.
- Jawad Ali (Speenghar Region) made his List A debut.

Match 15
4 September 2025
09:00
Scorecard

Band-e-Amir Region; 95 (28.5 overs)	v	Amo Region; 99/4 (22.3 overs)
Hashmatullah Shahidi 28 (36); Azim Zadran 4/25 (9 overs)		Abdul Malik 28 (39); Hashmatullah Shahidi 2/29 (5.3 overs)

Amo Region won by 6 wickets
Khost Cricket Ground, Khost
Umpires: Ahmed Shah Durrani and Muhammad Sabir
Player of the match: Yamin Ahmadzai (Amo Region)

- Band-e-Amir Region won the toss and elected to bat.

== Final ==
Final
4 September 2025
09:00
Scorecard

Band-e-Amir Region; 314 (50 overs)	v	Mis Ainak Region; 315/5 (48.3 overs)
Noor ul Rahman 57 (68); Dawlat Zadran 2/40 (8 overs)		Shahidullah 77* (73); Farmanullah 3/63 (10 overs)

Mis Ainak Region won by 5 wickets
Khost Cricket Ground, Khost
Umpires: Mahmood Kharoti and Ajmal Shamolzi
Player of the match: Shahidullah (Mis Ainak Region)

- Band-e-Amir Region won the toss and elected to bat.
