= 2026 National T20 Cup (Afghanistan) =

Cricket tournament in Afghanistan

- Dates: 2 – 14 May 2026
- Administrator: Afghanistan Cricket Board
- Cricket format: Twenty20
- Tournament format(s): Double round-robin and final
- Host: Kunduz
- Champions: Boost Region (1st title)
- Runners-up: Mis Ainak Region
- Participants: 5
- Matches: 21
- Most runs: Numan Shah (403)
- Most wickets: Roohullah Arab (14); Izharulhaq Naveed (14); Abdollah Ahmadzai (14)

The 2026 National T20 Cup, also known as e& National T20 Cup for sponsorship reasons, was the third season of the National T20 Cup, a Twenty20 cricket competition played in Afghanistan. The tournament took place from 2 May to 13 May 2026. Five regional teams competed in a double round-robin league, with all matches played at Kunduz Cricket Ground in Kunduz.

Boost Region won their first title by defeating Mis Ainak Region in the final by 5 wickets.

== Teams ==
The following teams participated in the tournament:

- Amo Region
- Band-e-Amir Region
- Boost Region
- Mis Ainak Region
- Speenghar Region

== Standings ==
=== Points table ===
Pos	Team	Pld	W	L	NR	Pts	NRR	Qualification
1	Mis Ainak Region	8	5	3	0	10	0.185	Advanced to final
2	Boost Region	8	5	3	0	10	−0.083	Advanced to final
3	Band-e-Amir Region	8	4	4	0	8	0.119	
4	Amo Region	8	3	5	0	6	0.082	
5	Speenghar Region	8	3	5	0	6	−0.294	

Source: ESPNcricinfo

=== Points summary ===
Team	Group matches								Play-offs
Team	1	2	3	4	5	6	7	8	Final
Amo Region	0	2	4	6	6	6	6	6	
Band-e-Amir Region	2	2	2	4	6	6	6	8	
Boost Region	2	4	4	4	6	8	10	10	W
Mis Ainak Region	2	2	4	4	6	6	8	10	L
Speenghar Region	0	0	2	2	2	4	6	6	

Win	Loss	Tie	No result	Eliminated

- Note: The total points at the end of each group match are listed.
- Note: Click on the points or results to see the match summary.

== Round-robin ==
Match 1
2 May 2026
09:00
Scorecard

Speenghar Region; 115 (16.4 overs)	v	Boost Region; 116/6 (16.5 overs)
Shawkat Zaman 28 (24); Ijaz Ul Haq 2/18 (2 overs)		Numan Shah 45 (33); Faridoon Dawoodzai 2/13 (3 overs); Aqil Khan 2/13 (3 overs)

Boost Region won by 4 wickets
Kunduz Cricket Ground, Kunduz
Umpires: Ahmed Shah Durrani and Ajmal Shamalzai
Player of the match: Ijaz Ul Haq (Boost Region)

- Speenghar Region won the toss and elected to bat.
- Amir Hamza, Azizullah Miakhil, Ijaz Ul Haq, Imran Mazari, Khair Mohammad, Khano Khpalwak, Khatir Stanikzai, Mohammad Sabir, Nabi Mia Khail, Nazifullah Amiri, Nooristani Omarzai, Rohullah Arab and Zaitullah Shaheen all made their T20 debuts.

Match 2
2 May 2026
14:00
Scorecard

Amo Region; 171/5 (20 overs)	v	Mis Ainak Region; 175/5 (19.2 overs)
Jawid Ahmadzai 51 (23); Abdullah 1/27 (4 overs)		Mahboob Khan 64* (50); Hafeez Zadran 2/20 (3.2 overs)

Mis Ainak Region won by 5 wickets
Kunduz Cricket Ground, Kunduz
Umpires: Nasir Khan and Mahmood Kharoti
Player of the match: Mahboob Khan (Mis Ainak Region)

- Amo Region won the toss and elected to bat.
- Abdullah, Fahim Qasemi, Hafeez Zadran, Keramatullah, Sabir Bahrami, Salam Khan and Ziauddin Sharifi all made their T20 debuts.

Match 3
3 May 2026
09:00
Scorecard

Boost Region; 166/7 (20 overs)	v	Mis Ainak Region; 162/6 (20 overs)
Najibullah Zadran 61* (39); Abdullah 2/32 (4 overs)		Khalid Taniwal 95* (70); Amir Hamza 2/54 (4 overs)

Boost Region won by 4 runs
Kunduz Cricket Ground, Kunduz
Umpires: Farooq Khan and Tahsil Shinwari
Player of the match: Najibullah Zadran (Boost Region)

- Mis Ainak Region won the toss and elected to field.

Match 4
3 May 2026
14:00
Scorecard

Speenghar Region; 146/8 (20 overs)	v	Band-e-Amir Region; 147/6 (18.4 overs)
Zubaid Akbari 60 (45); Abdollah Ahmadzai 4/23 (4 overs)		Khalid Ahmadzai 51 (30); Aqil Khan 2/20 (3 overs)

Band-e-Amir Region won by 4 wickets
Kunduz Cricket Ground, Kunduz
Player of the match: Abdollah Ahmadzai (Band-e-Amir Region)

- Speenghar Region won the toss and elected bat.
- Rahmatullah Kharoti, Sabir Gurbaz and Said Khan (Band-e-Amir Region) all made their T20 debuts.

Match 5
4 May 2026
09:00
Scorecard

Boost Region; 116 (18.5 overs)	v	Amo Region; 118/6 (16.5 overs)
Azizullah Miakhil 34 (19); Sayed Shirzad 3/24 (3.5 overs)		Jawid Ahmadzai 42 (37); Nooristani Omarzai 3/22 (3 overs)

Amo Region won by 4 wickets
Kunduz Cricket Ground, Kunduz
Umpires: Mahmood Kharoti and Ajmal Shamalzai
Player of the match: Sayed Shirzad (Amo Region)

- Boost Region won the tosss and elected to bat.
- Ibrahim Kharoti and Saif Nangyal (Boost Region) both made their T20 debuts.

Match 6
4 May 2026
14:00
Scorecard

Band-e-Amir Region; 170/9 (20 overs)	v	Mis Ainak Region; 171 (19.4 overs)
Muslim Musa 42 (22); Abdullah 3/38 (4 overs)		Ijaz Ahmad Ahmadzai 83 (40); Said Khan 3/25 (4 overs)

Mis Ainak Region won by 1 wicket
Kunduz Cricket Ground, Kunduz
Umpires: Ihsanullah Danish and Ahmed Shah Durrani
Player of the match: Ijaz Ahmad Ahmadzai (Mis Ainak Region)

- Mis Ainak Region won the toss and elected to field.
- Rahman Zurmatia and Sami Mubarez (Mis Ainak Region) both made their T20 debuts.

Match 7
5 May 2026
09:00
Scorecard

Band-e-Amir Region; 139/7 (20 overs)	v	Amo Region; 140/5 (18.1 overs)
Haroon Khan 61 (47); Hafeez Zadran 4/19 (4 overs)		Mohammad Akram 43 (30); Izharulhaq Naveed 2/14 (4 overs)

Amo Region won by 5 wickets
Kunduz Cricket Ground, Kunduz
Umpires: Farooq Khan and Tahsil Shinwari
Player of the match: Hafeez Zadran (Amo Region)

- Amo Region won the toss and elected to field.

Match 8
5 May 2026
14:00
Scorecard

Speenghar Region; 175/7 (20 overs)	v	Mis Ainak Region; 164 (19.5 overs)
Zubaid Akbari 45 (29); Nijat Masood 3/25 (4 overs)		Rahman Zurmatia 94 (56); Roohullah Arab 5/29 (3.5 overs)

Speenghar Region won by 11 runs
Kunduz Cricket Ground, Kunduz
Umpires: Nasir Khan and Muhammad Sabir
Player of the match: Roohullah Arab (Speenghar Region)

- Mis Ainak Region won the toss and elected to field.
- Abdul Zahoor Lali and Zafar Khan Alozai (Speenghar Region) both made their T20 debuts.
- Roohullah Arab (Speenghar Region) took his maiden five-wicket haul in T20s.

Match 9
6 May 2026
09:00
Scorecard

Amo Region; 163/5 (20 overs)	v	Speenghar Region; 159/6 (20 overs)
Tariq Stanikzai 52* (43); Roohullah Arab 2/35 (4 overs)		Akbar Musazai 73 (45); Sayed Jalal 2/32 (4 overs)

Amo Region won by 4 runs
Kunduz Cricket Ground, Kunduz
Umpires: Ihsanullah Danish and Ahmed Shah Durrani
Player of the match: Sayed Jalal (Amo Region)

- Speenghar Region won the toss and elected to field.
- Sayed Jalal (Amo Region) made his T20 debut.

Match 10
6 May 2026
14:00
Scorecard

Boost Region; 164/6 (20 overs)	v	Band-e-Amir Region; 165/2 (15.2 overs)
Saif Nangyal 49 (38); Lais Lawang 2/41 (4 overs)		Hazratullah Zazai 103* (48); Amir Hamza 1/18 (2 overs)

Band-e-Amir Region won by 8 wickets
Kunduz Cricket Ground, Kunduz
Umpires: Mahmood Kharoti and Tahsil Shinwari
Player of the match: Hazratullah Zazai (Band-e-Amir Region)

- Lais Lawang Band-e-Amir Region) made his T20 debut.

Match 11
8 May 2026
09:00
Scorecard

Mis Ainak Region; 200/6 (20 overs)	v	Amo Region; 187/6 (20 overs)
Khalid Taniwal 71 (39); Azim Zadran 3/24 (4 overs)		Haji Murad Muradi 82 (45); Lutfullah Mohammadi 1/29 (4 overs)

Mis Ainak Region won by 13 runs
Kunduz Cricket Ground, Kunduz
Umpires: Muhammad Sabir and Ajmal Shamalzai
Player of the match: Asghar Atal (Mis Ainak Region)

- Sharif Ullah Riaz (Mis Ainak Region) made his T20 debut.

Match 12
8 May 2026
14:00
Scorecard

Speenghar Region; 196/6 (20 overs)	v	Boost Region; 197/6 (19.5 overs)
Mohammad Ishaq 72 (37); Abdullah Tarakhail 2/34 (4 overs)		Mohammad Sabir Hanif 57 (45); Nabi Mia Khail 2/25 (4 overs)

Kunduz Cricket Ground, Kunduz
Umpires: Farooq Khan and Nasir Khan
Player of the match: Mohammad Sabir Hanif (Boost Region)

- Speenghar Region won the toss and elected to bat.

Match 13
9 May 2026
09:00
Scorecard

Speenghar Region; 139/8 (20 overs)	v	Amo Region; 134/9 (20 overs)
Zubaid Akbari 64 (39); Mohammad Riaz 3/5 (1 over)		Ijaz Ahmad 30 (28); Roohullah Arab 4/14 (4 overs)

Speenghar Region won by 5 runs
Kunduz Cricket Ground, Kunduz
Umpires: Ihsanullah Danish and Ahmed Shah Durrani
Player of the match: Roohullah Arab (Speenghar Region)

- Amo Region won the toss and elected to field.

Match 14
9 May 2026
14:00
Scorecard

Mis Ainak Region; 118 (19.3 overs)	v	Band-e-Amir Region; 119/2 (16.5 overs)
Mohammad Younus 22 (17); Abdullah Ahmadzai 4/33 (4 overs)		Osman Sadat 51* (49); Asghar Atal 1/12 (2 overs)

Band-e-Amir Region won by 8 wickets
Kunduz Cricket Ground, Kunduz
Umpires: Nasir Khan and Muhammad Sabir
Player of the match: Abdullah Ahmadzai (Band-e-Amir Region)

- Mis Ainak Region won the toss and elected to bat.

Match 15
10 May 2026
09:00
Scorecard

Amo Region; 64/4 (5 overs)	v	Boost Region; 65/2 (4.1 overs)
Imran Mir 37 (12); Nooristani Omarzai 2/17 (2 overs)		Najibullah Zadran 22 (8); Sayed Shirzad 2/27 (2 overs)

Boost Region won by 8 wickets
Kunduz Cricket Ground, Kunduz
Umpires: Mahmood Kharoti and Ajmal Shamalzai
Player of the match: Nooristani Omarzai (Boost Region)

- Boost Region won the toss and elected to field.
- The match was reduced to 5 overs per side due to rain.

Match 16
10 May 2026
14:00
Scorecard

Band-e-Amir Region; 166/6 (20 overs)	v	Speenghar Region; 169/4 (19.3 overs)
Sediqullah Pacha 55 (39); Faridoon Dawoodzai 2/21 (4 overs)		Shawkat Zaman 62* (45); Izharulhaq Naveed 2/34 (4 overs)

Speenghar Region won by 6 wickets
Kunduz Cricket Ground, Kunduz
Umpires: Ihsanullah Danish and Farooq Khan
Player of the match: Shawkat Zaman (Speenghar Region)

- Band-e-Amir Region won the toss and elected to bat.

Match 17
11 May 2026
09:00
Scorecard

Boost Region; 209/5 (20 overs)	v	Band-e-Amir Region; 175/9 (20 overs)
Mohibullah Hamraz 85 (41); Rahmatullah Kharoti 2/28 (4 overs)		Sohail Khan Zurmati 51 (26); Abdullah Tarakhail 5/30 (4 overs)

Boost Region won by 34 runs
Kunduz Cricket Ground, Kunduz
Umpires: Ahmed Shah Durrani and Muhammad Sabir
Player of the match: Abdullah Tarakhail (Boost Region)

- Band-e-Amir Region won the toss and elected to field.
- Abdullah Tarakhail (Boost Region) took his first five-wicket haul in T20s.

Match 18
11 May 2026
14:00
Scorecard

Speenghar Region; 136 (19.3 overs)	v	Mis Ainak Region; 140/3 (17.2 overs)
Zubairullah Akbari 34 (33); Nijat Masood 3/17 (2.3 overs)		Khalid Taniwal 43 (23); Aqil Khan 2/22 (4 overs)

Mis Ainak Region won by 7 wickets
Kunduz Cricket Ground, Kunduz
Umpires: Ihsanullah Danish and Nasir Khan
Player of the match: Nijat Masood (Mis Ainak Region)

- Speenghar Region won the toss and elected to bat.

Match 19
12 May 2026
09:00
Scorecard

Boost Region; 184/4 (20 overs)	v	Mis Ainak Region; 190/4 (18.3 overs)
Numan Shah 94 (63); Nijat Masood 1/25 (4 overs)		Ziauddin Sharifi 45 (24); Khair Mohammad 2/37 (4 overs)

Mis Ainak Region won by 6 wickets
Kunduz Cricket Ground, Kunduz
Umpires: Ihsanullah Danish and Mahmood Kharoti
Player of the match: Ziauddin Sharifi (Mis Ainak Region)

- Boost Region won the toss and elected to bat.

Match 20
12 May 2026
14:00
Scorecard

Amo Region; 189/8 (20 overs)	v	Band-e-Amir Region; 189/9 (20 overs)
Jawid Ahmadzai 61 (34); Rahmatullah Kharoti 3/20 (4 overs)		Sediqullah Pacha 49 (26); Salam Khan 2/30 (4 overs)

Match tied (Band-e-Amir Region won the Super Over)
Kunduz Cricket Ground, Kunduz
Umpires: Farooq Khan and Nasir Khan
Player of the match: Rahmatullah Kharoti (Band-e-Amir Region)

- Amo Region won the toss and elected to bat.
- Super Over: Band-e-Amir Region 17/1, Amo Region 4/1

== Final ==
Final
13 May 2026
14:00
Scorecard

Mis Ainak Region; 211/4 (20 overs)	v	Boost Region; 217/5 (18 overs)
Emal 73* (32); Mohibullah Hamraz 1/18 (2 overs)		Numan Shah 119* (56); Mohammad Younus 2/64 (4 overs)

Boost Region won by 5 wickets
Kunduz Cricket Ground, Kunduz
Umpires: Farooq Khan and Mahmood Kharoti
Player of the match: Numan Shah (Boost Region)

- Boost Region won the toss and elected to field.
- Numan Shah (Boost Region) scored his maiden century in T20s.

== End of season awards ==
- Best Batter: Numan Shah
- Best Bowler: Izharulhaq Naveed
- Best All-Rounder: Amir Hamza
- Emerging Player: Rahmat Ullah Kharoti
