= 2024 Qosh Tepa National T20 Cup =

Cricket tournament in Afghanistan

- Dates: 1 – 13 May 2024
- Administrator: Afghanistan Cricket Board
- Cricket format: Twenty20
- Tournament format(s): Double round-robin and final
- Host: Afghanistan
- Champions: Band-e-Amir Region (1st title)
- Runners-up: Mis Ainak Region
- Participants: 5
- Matches: 21
- Player of the series: Ibrahim Zadran (Mis Ainak Region)
- Most runs: Ibrahim Zadran (Mis Ainak Region) (323)
- Most wickets: Wahidullah Zadran (Mis Ainak Region) (13)

The 2024 Qosh Tepa National T20 Cup was the inaugural season of the National T20 Cup, a Twenty20 cricket competition played in Afghanistan. The tournament took place from 1 to 13 May 2024. Five regional teams competed in a double round-robin league, with the matches being held at Kabul. In March 2024, the Afghanistan Cricket Board (ACB) confirmed the fixtures for the tournament. The competition served as the preparation for national players and the criteria for team selection ahead of the 2024 ICC Men's T20 World Cup.

== Teams ==
The following teams participated in the tournament:

- Mis Ainak Region
- Band-e-Amir Region
- Speen Ghar Region
- Amo Region
- Boost Region

== Squads ==
The following squads were announced for the tournament.

Amo Region	Mis Ainak Region	Speen Ghar Region	Band-e-Amir Region	Boost Region
Gulbadin Naib (c); Mohammad Ishaq; Abdul Had; Abdul Malik; Mohammad Akram; Javed Ahmadzai; Darwish Rasooli; Ijaz Ahmad Mehri; Hayat Nasiri; Ijaz Ahmad Ahmadzai; Allah Noor Nasiri; Sharafuddin Ashraf; Zahir Pakteen; Izharulhaq Naveed; Abdul Rahman; Saleem Safi; Kamil Kakar; Mohammad Gul; Mujeeb Ur Rahman	Ibrahim Zadran (c); Afsar Zazai; Mahboob Taskin; Ihsanullah; Naveed Obaid; Rahim Mangal; Shahidullah Kamal; Rahmanullah; Barakatullah Ibrahimzai; Emal Shaheen; Farmanullah Safi; Juma Gul; Haqmal Arya; Zia-ur-Rehman; Khalil Gurbaz; Dawlat Zadran; Naveed Zadran; Naseem Mangal; Zia Ur Rahman Sharif	Samiullah Shinwari (c); Mohammad Shahzad; Jalat Musazai; Zubaid Akbari; Shabir Noori; Wafiullah Tarakhil; Irshad Safi; Shawkat Zaman; Baheer Shah Mahboob; Sediqullah Pacha; Yousuf Shah; Tahir Adil; Esmat Alam; Qais Ahmad; Naseer Khan; Fareed Ahmad; Ibrahim Abdurrahimzai; Aftab Alam; Yama Arab; Yousuf Zazai	Hashmatullah Shahidi (c); Ikram Ali Khail; Khalid Ahmadzai; Riaz Hassan; Sediq Atal; Mohammad Haroon; Bahar Ali Shinwari; Asif Musazai; Nisar Wahdat; Islam Zazai; Karim Janat; Shams Ur Rahman; Amir Hamza; Arab Gul Momand; Allah Mohammad Ghazanfar; Bilal Sami; Wafadar Momand; Nijat Masood; Khalil Ahmad	Najibullah Zadran (c); Numan Shah; Masood Gurbaz; Hazratullah Zazai; Imran Mir; Rahmat Shah; Nasir Jamal; Ali Ahmad; Bilal Ahmad; Abdullah Tarakhail; Nangialai Kharoti; Mohammadullah; Abdul Baqi; Babar Khan; Yamin Ahmadzai; Sayed Shirzad; Lalbaz Sinzai; Faridoon Dawoodzai; Mohibullah Zurmati; Bashir Ahmad

== Points table ==
Pos	Team	Pld	W	L	NR	Pts	NRR	Qualification
1	Band-e-Amir Region	8	5	2	1	11	0.641	Advanced to final
2	Mis Ainak Region	8	5	2	1	11	0.246	Advanced to final
3	Boost Region	8	4	4	0	8	0.496	
4	Amo Region	8	2	5	1	5	−0.222	
5	Speen Ghar Region	8	2	5	1	5	−1.222	

Source: ESPNcricinfo

== League stage ==
1 May 2024
09:30
Scorecard

Band-e-Amir Region; 114/6 (20 overs)	v	Boost Region; 111/7 (20 overs)
Hashmatullah Shahidi 45 (55); Mohibullah Zurmati 2/15 (3 overs)		Najibullah Zadran 52* (37); Amir Hamza 2/8 (3 overs)

Band-e-Amir Region won by 3 runs
Kabul International Cricket Stadium, Kabul
Umpires: Farooq Khan and Ahmed Shah Pakteen
Player of the match: Hashmatullah Shahidi (Band-e-Amir Region)

- Boost Region won the toss and elected to field.
- Khalid Ahmadzai, Arab Gul (Band-e-Amir Region) Mohibullah Hamraz, Faridoon, Abdullah Tarakhail and Mohammadullah (Boost Region) all made their T20 debuts.

1 May 2024
14:00
Scorecard

Mis Ainak Region; 108/6 (20 overs)	v	Speen Ghar Region; 112/7 (20 overs)
Mehboob Taskin 25* (22); Aftab Alam 2/17 (4 overs)		Samiullah Shinwari 39* (37); Haqmal Arya 2/8 (4 overs)

Speen Ghar Region won by 3 wickets
Kabul International Cricket Stadium, Kabul
Umpires: Izatullah Safi and Muhammad Sabir
Player of the match: Samiullah Shinwari (Speen Ghar Region)

- Speen Ghar Region won the toss and elected to field.
- Naseer Khan Maroofkhil (Speen Ghar Region) Haqmal Arya, Ihsanullah and Mehboob Taskin (Mis Ainak Region) all made their T20 debuts.

2 May 2024
09:30
Scorecard

Amo Region; 142/7 (20 overs)	v	Band-e-Amir Region; 143/0 (16.3 overs)
Allah Noor 34 (28); Nijat Masood 3/29 (4 overs)		Sediqullah Atal 63* (46)

Band-e-Amir Region won by 10 wickets
Kabul International Cricket Stadium, Kabul
Umpires: Mahmood Kharoti and Bismillah Jan Shinwari
Player of the match: Bahar Shinwari (Band-e-Amir Region)

- Band-e-Amir Region won the toss and elected to field.
- Lalbaz Sinzai (Amo Region) made his T20 debut.

2 May 2024
14:00
Scorecard

Mis Ainak Region; 137/6 (20 overs)	v	Boost Region; 123/8 (20 overs)
Ibrahim Zadran 65 (48); Faridoon 3/16 (4 overs)		Imran Mir 24 (16); Wahidullah Zadran 2/17 (4)

Mis Ainak Region won by 14 runs
Kabul International Cricket Stadium, Kabul
Umpires: Ahmed Shah Durrani and Ajmal Shamolzi
Player of the match: Ibrahim Zadran (Mis Ainak Region)

- Boost Region won the toss and elected to field.
- Ihsanullah (Mis Ainak Region) made his T20 debut.

3 May 2024
09:30
Scorecard

Speen Ghar Region; 22/2 (4 overs)	v	Amo Region
Mohammad Shahzad 12 (11); Sharafuddin Ashraf 1/2 (1 over)

No result
Kabul International Cricket Stadium, Kabul
Umpires: Farooq Khan and Izatullah Safi

- Amo Region won the toss and elected to field.
- No further play was possible due to rain.
- Jawid Ahmadzai (Amo Region) made his T20 debut.

4 May 2024
14:00
Scorecard

Band-e-Amir Region	v	Mis Ainak Region

Match abandoned
Kabul International Cricket Stadium, Kabul
Umpires: Ahmed Shah Pakteen and Muhammad Sabir

- No toss
- No play was possible due to rain.

5 May 2024
09:30
Scorecard

Band-e-Amir Region; 143/4 (20 overs)	v	Speen Ghar Region; 103 (18.4 overs)
Hashmatullah Shahidi 43 (36); Yousuf Zazai 3/18 (4 overs)		Wafiullah Tarakhil 45 (48); Amir Hamza 3/26 (4 overs)

Band-e-Amir Region won by 40 runs
Kabul International Cricket Stadium, Kabul
Umpires: Farooq Khan and Ahmed Shah Pakteen
Player of the match: Karim Janat (Band-e-Amir Region)

- Speen Ghar Region won the toss and elected to field.
- Hamza Khan (Band-e-Amir Region) made his T20 debut.

5 May 2024
14:00
Scorecard

Boost Region; 185/7 (20 overs)	v	Amo Region; 161/7 (20 overs)
Najibullah Zadran 55 (36); Izharulhaq Naveed 3/17 (4 overs)		Mohammad Akram 51 (30); Mohammadullah 2/17 (4 overs)

Boost Region won by 24 runs
Kabul International Cricket Stadium, Kabul
Umpires: Izatullah Safi and Muhammad Sabir
Player of the match: Najibullah Zadran (Boost Region)

- Adam Khan, Amanullah (Amo Region) Jawid Sulimankhil, Numam Shah and Samiullah (Boost Region) all made their T20 debuts.

6 May 2024
09:30
Scorecard

Boost Region; 206/3 (20 overs)	v	Speen Ghar Region; 108 (17.3 overs)
Hazratullah Zazai 116* (66); Naseer Khan Maroofkhil 1/25 (4 overs)		Naseer Khan Maroofkhil 22* (23); Mohammadullah 3/22 (4 overs)

Boost Region won by 98 runs
Kabul International Cricket Stadium, Kabul
Umpires: Ahmed Shah Durrani and Mahmood Kharoti
Player of the match: Hazratullah Zazai (Boost Region)

- Boost Region won the toss and elected to bat.
- Basir Ahmed (Boost Region) and Babar Khan (Speen Ghar Region) both made their T20 debuts.

6 May 2024
14:00
Scorecard

Mis Ainak Region; 187/5 (20 overs)	v	Amo Region; 176/8 (20 overs)
Naveed Obaid 73 (48); Zahir Khan 2/31 (4 overs)		Tariq Stanikzai 51 (36); Ziaur Rahman 3/27 (4 overs)

Mis Ainak Region won by 11 runs
Kabul International Cricket Stadium, Kabul
Umpires: Ahmed Shah Pakteen and Ajmal Shamolzi
Player of the match: Naveed Obaid (Mis Ainak Region)

- Mis Ainak Region won the toss and elected to bat.
- Subhanullah Hotak (Amo Region) and Mohammad Younus (Mis Ainak Region) both made their T20 debuts.

7 May 2024
09:30
Scorecard

Boost Region; 157/7 (20 overs)	v	Mis Ainak Region; 156/3 (20 overs)
Rahmat Shah 50 (36); Mohammad Younus 2/22 (4 overs)		Afsar Zazai 55* (34); Mohammadullah 1/28 (4 overs)

Mis Ainak Region won by 7 wickets
Kabul International Cricket Stadium, Kabul
Umpires: Mahmood Kharoti and Bismillah Jan Shinwari
Player of the match: Afsar Zazai (Mis Ainak Region)

- Mis Ainak Region won the toss and elected to field.
- Mohammad Riaz (Mis Ainak Region) made his T20 debut.

7 May 2024
14:00
Scorecard

Speen Ghar Region; 155/8 (20 overs)	v	Amo Region; 122 (18.5 overs)
Samiullah Shinwari 37 (43); Sharafuddin Ashraf 4/20 (4 overs)		Mohammad Akram 39 (33); Samiullah Shinwari 3/15 (4 overs)

Speen Ghar Region won by 33 runs
Kabul International Cricket Stadium, Kabul
Umpires: Ahmed Shah Durrani and Ajmal Shamolzi
Player of the match: Samiullah Shinwari (Speen Ghar Region)

- Speen Ghar Region won the toss and elected to bat.

8 May 2024
09:30
Scorecard

Band-e-Amir Region; 115/8 (20 overs)	v	Mis Ainak Region; 110/7 (20 overs)
Sediqullah Atal 25 (22); Mohammad Riaz 2/14 (4 overs)		Ibrahim Zadran 36 (35); Khalil Ahmed 2/24 (4 overs)

Band-e-Amir Region won by 5 runs
Kabul International Cricket Stadium, Kabul
Umpires: Bismillah Jan Shinwari and Izatullah Safi
Player of the match: Khalil Ahmed (Band-e-Amir Region)

- Haroon Khan (Band-e-Amir Region) made his T20 debut.

8 May 2024
14:00
Scorecard

Amo Region; 185/5 (20 overs)	v	Boost Region; 117 (17.4 overs)
Sharafuddin Ashraf 66 (36); Samiullah 2/43 (4 overs)		Hazratullah Zazai 35 (27); Zahir Khan 4/7 (2.4 overs)

Amo Region won by 68 runs
Kabul International Cricket Stadium, Kabul
Umpires: Farooq Khan and Muhammad Sabir
Player of the match: Sharafuddin Ashraf (Amo Region)

- Amo Region won the toss and elected to bat.
- Faisal (Amo Region) and Aqil Khan (Boost Region) both made their T20 debuts.

9 May 2024
09:30
Scorecard

Speen Ghar Region; 131/6 (20 overs)	v	Mis Ainak Region; 134/9 (19.4 overs)
Ismat Alam 38* (29); Ziaur Rahman 2/25 (4 overs)		Afsar Zazai 54 (41); Aftab Alam 4/22 (4 overs)

Mis Ainak Region won by 1 wickets
Kabul International Cricket Stadium, Kabul
Umpires: Mahmood Kharoti and Ajmal Shamolzi
Player of the match: Afsar Zazai (Mis Ainak Region)

- Speen Ghar Region won the toss and elected to bat.
- Arshaduddin Safi (Speen Ghar Region) made his T20 debut.

9 May 2024
14:00
Scorecard

Boost Region; 237/3 (20 overs)	v	Band-e-Amir Region; 219/6 (20 overs)
Numan Shah 86 (53); Nijat Masood 1/44 (4 overs)		Shamsurrahman 84* (33); Nasir Jamal 2/25 (3 overs)

Boost Region won by 18 runs
Kabul International Cricket Stadium, Kabul
Umpires: Ahmed Shah Durrani and Bismillah Jan Shinwari
Player of the match: Numan Shah (Boost Region)

- Boost Region won the toss and elected to bat.

10 May 2024
09:30
Scorecard

Amo Region; 151/5 (20 overs)	v	Band-e-Amir Region; 141/6 (20 overs)
Mohammad Akram 51 (33); Bilal Sami 2/28 (3 overs)		Sediqullah Atal 64 (35); Izharulhaq Naveed 4/12 (3 overs)

Amo Region won by 10 runs
Kabul International Cricket Stadium, Kabul
Umpires: Izatullah Safi and Muhammad Sabir
Player of the match: Izharulhaq Naveed (Amo Region)

- Band-e-Amir Region won the toss and elected to field.
- Kamil Kakar (Amo Region) made his T20 debut.

10 May 2024
14:00
Scorecard

Speen Ghar Region; 123/7 (20 overs)	v	Boost Region; 124/5 (13.5 overs)
Samiullah Shinwari 49 (38); Mohammadullah 2/18 (4 overs)		Rahmat Shah 69* (51); Ismat Alam 2/8 (4 overs)

Boost Region won by 5 wickets
Kabul International Cricket Stadium, Kabul
Umpires: Farooq Khan and Ahmed Shah Pakteen
Player of the match: Rahmat Shah (Boost Region)

- Speen Ghar Region won the toss and elected to bat.
- Bilal Ahmad (Boost Region) made his T20 debut.

11 May 2024
09:30
Scorecard

Speen Ghar Region; 144/6 (20 overs)	v	Band-e-Amir Region; 148/3 (15.5 overs)
Mohammad Shahzad 47 (40); Khalil Ahmed 4/25 (4 overs)		Sediqullah Atal 60 (32); Naseer Khan Maroofkhil 1/12 (2 overs)

Band-e-Amir Region won by 7 wickets
Kabul International Cricket Stadium, Kabul
Umpires: Ahmed Shah Durrani and Ajmal Shamolzi
Player of the match: Khalil Ahmed (Band-e-Amir Region)

- Speen Ghar Region won the toss and elected to bat.

11 May 2024
14:00
Scorecard

Mis Ainak Region; 200/2 (20 overs)	v	Amo Region; 191/9 (20 overs)
Ibrahim Zadran 101* (70); Mohammad Gul Alizai 1/37 (4 overs)		Mohammad Gul Alizai 47 (33); Ziaur Rahman 2/30 (4 overs)

Mis Ainak Region won by 9 runs
Kabul International Cricket Stadium, Kabul
Umpires: Mahmood Kharoti and Bismillah Jan Shinwari
Player of the match: Ibrahim Zadran (Mis Ainak Region)

- Mis Ainak Region won the toss and elected to bat.
- Ibrahim Zadran (Mis Ainak Region) scored his first century in T20s.

== Final ==
13 May 2024
11:00
Scorecard

Band-e-Amir Region; 195/5 (20 overs)	v	Mis Ainak Region; 173 (19.4 overs)
Karim Janat 107 (53); Wahidullah Zadran 1/27 (4 overs)		Shahidullah 41 (28); Karim Janat 4/34 (4 overs)

Band-e-Amir Region won by 23 runs
Kabul International Cricket Stadium, Kabul
Umpires: Mahmood Kharoti and Bismillah Jan Shinwari
Player of the match: Karim Janat (Band-e-Amir Region)

- Band-e-Amir Region won the toss and elected to bat.
