= Bangladeshi cricket team against Afghanistan in the UAE in 2025–26 =

International cricket tour

	Afghanistan	Bangladesh
- Dates: 2 – 14 October 2025
Captains	Hashmatullah Shahidi (ODIs); Rashid Khan (T20Is)	Mehidy Hasan Miraz (ODIs); Jaker Ali (T20Is)

One Day International series
- Results: Afghanistan won the 3-match series 3–0
Most runs	Ibrahim Zadran (213)	Saif Hassan (91)
Most wickets	Rashid Khan (11)	Mehidy Hasan Miraz (5); Tanzim Hasan Sakib (5)
- Player of the series: Ibrahim Zadran (Afg)

Twenty20 International series
- Results: Bangladesh won the 3-match series 3–0
Most runs	Rahmanullah Gurbaz (82)	Tanzid Hasan (86)
Most wickets	Rashid Khan (6)	Nasum Ahmed (5); Rishad Hossain (5)
- Player of the series: Nasum Ahmed (Ban)

The Bangladesh cricket team toured the United Arab Emirates in October 2025 to play against Afghanistan cricket team. The tour consisted of three One Day International (ODI) and three Twenty20 International (T20I) matches. In August 2025, the Afghanistan Cricket Board (ACB) confirmed the fixtures for the tour.

== Squads ==
Afghanistan		Bangladesh	
ODIs	T20Is	ODIs	T20Is
Hashmatullah Shahidi (c); Rahmat Shah (vc); Bashir Ahmad; Abdullah Ahmadzai; Ikram Alikhil (wk); Sediqullah Atal; Allah Mohammad Ghazanfar; Rahmanullah Gurbaz (wk); Rashid Khan; Nangialai Kharoti; Mohammad Nabi; Azmatullah Omarzai; Darwish Rasooli; ~~Mohammad Saleem~~; Bilal Sami; Ibrahim Zadran	Rashid Khan (c); Ibrahim Zadran (vc); Bashir Ahmad; Fareed Ahmad; Noor Ahmad; Abdullah Ahmadzai; Sharafuddin Ashraf; Sediqullah Atal; Rahmanullah Gurbaz (wk); Mohammad Ishaq (wk); Mohammad Nabi; Azmatullah Omarzai; Darwish Rasooli; Wafiullah Tarakhil; Mujeeb Ur Rahman	Mehidy Hasan Miraz (c); Jaker Ali (wk); Taskin Ahmed; Nurul Hasan; Saif Hassan; Tanzid Hasan; Rishad Hossain; Shamim Hossain; Tawhid Hridoy; Tanvir Islam; Hasan Mahmud; Mohammad Naim; Mustafizur Rahman; Nahid Rana; Tanzim Hasan Sakib; Najmul Hossain Shanto	Jaker Ali (c, wk); Nasum Ahmed; Taskin Ahmed; Parvez Hossain Emon; Mahedi Hasan; Nurul Hasan; Saif Hassan; Tanzid Hasan; Rishad Hossain; Shamim Hossain; Tawhid Hridoy; Shoriful Islam; Mustafizur Rahman; Mohammad Saifuddin; Tanzim Hasan Sakib; Soumya Sarkar

Afghanistan also named Allah Mohammad Ghazanfar and Rahmat Shah as reserves for the T20I series while Bilal Sami and Faridoon Dawoodzai were named as reserves for the ODI series. On 6 October, Mohammad Saleem was ruled out of the ODI series due to a groin injury and was replaced by Bilal Sami. On 12 October, Rahmat Shah was ruled out of the third ODI due to a calf injury.

== T20I series ==
=== 1st T20I ===
2 October 2025
18:30 (N)
Scorecard

Afghanistan; 151/9 (20 overs)	v	Bangladesh; 153/6 (18.4 overs)
Rahmanullah Gurbaz 40 (31); Rishad Hossain 2/33 (4 overs)		Parvez Hossain Emon 54 (37); Rashid Khan 4/18 (4 overs)

Bangladesh won by 4 wickets
Sharjah Cricket Stadium, Sharjah
Umpires: Ahmed Shah Pakteen (Afg) and Izatullah Safi (Afg)
Player of the match: Parvez Hossain Emon (Ban)

- Afghanistan won the toss and elected to bat.

=== 2nd T20I ===
3 October 2025
18:30 (N)
Scorecard

Afghanistan; 147/5 (20 overs)	v	Bangladesh; 150/8 (19.1 overs)
Ibrahim Zadran 38 (37); Nasum Ahmed 2/25 (4 overs)		Shamim Hossain 33 (22); Azmatullah Omarzai 4/23 (3.1 overs)

Bangladesh won by 2 wickets
Sharjah Cricket Stadium, Sharjah
Umpires: Ahmed Shah Durrani (Afg) and Izatullah Safi (Afg)
Player of the match: Shoriful Islam (Ban)

- Bangladesh won the toss and elected to field.
- Wafiullah Tarakhil (Afg) made his T20I debut.

=== 3rd T20I ===
5 October 2025
18:30 (N)
Scorecard

Afghanistan; 143/9 (20 overs)	v	Bangladesh; 144/4 (18 overs)
Darwish Rasooli 32 (29); Mohammad Saifuddin 3/15 (3 overs)		Saif Hassan 64* (38); Mujeeb Ur Rahman 2/26 (4 overs)

Bangladesh won by 6 wickets
Sharjah Cricket Stadium, Sharjah
Umpires: Ahmed Shah Pakteen (Afg) and Izatullah Safi (Afg)
Player of the match: Saif Hassan (Ban)

- Bangladesh won the toss and elected to field.
- Bashir Ahmad (Afg) made his T20I debut.

== ODI series ==
=== 1st ODI ===
8 October 2025
16:00 (D/N)
Scorecard

Bangladesh; 221 (48.5 overs)	v	Afghanistan; 226/5 (47.1 overs)
Mehidy Hasan Miraz 60 (87); Rashid Khan 3/38 (10 overs)		Rahmat Shah 50 (70); Tanzim Hasan Sakib 3/31 (7 overs)

Afghanistan won by 5 wickets
Sheikh Zayed Cricket Stadium, Abu Dhabi
Umpires: Adrian Holdstock (SA) and Ahmed Shah Pakteen (Afg)
Player of the match: Azmatullah Omarzai (Afg)

- Bangladesh won the toss and elected to bat.
- Bashir Ahmad (Afg) and Saif Hassan (Ban) both made their ODI debuts.
- Rashid Khan (Afg) took his 200th wicket in ODIs.
- Rahmat Shah (Afg) scored his 4,000th run in ODIs.

=== 2nd ODI ===
11 October 2025
16:00 (D/N)
Scorecard

Afghanistan; 190 (44.5 overs)	v	Bangladesh; 109 (28.3 overs)
Ibrahim Zadran 95 (140); Mehidy Hasan Miraz 3/42 (10 overs)		Tawhid Hridoy 24 (34); Rashid Khan 5/17 (8.3 overs)

Afghanistan won by 81 runs
Sheikh Zayed Cricket Stadium, Abu Dhabi
Umpires: Akbar Ali (UAE) and Izatullah Safi (Afg)
Player of the match: Ibrahim Zadran (Afg)

- Afghanistan won the toss and elected to bat.
- Azmatullah Omarzai (Afg) played in his 100th international match.
- Rahmat Shah (Afg) scored his 5,000th run in international cricket.

=== 3rd ODI ===
14 October 2025
16:00 (D/N)
Scorecard

Afghanistan; 293/9 (50 overs)	v	Bangladesh; 93 (27.1 overs)
Ibrahim Zadran 95 (111); Saif Hassan 3/6 (4 overs)		Saif Hassan 43 (54); Bilal Sami 5/33 (7.1 overs)

Afghanistan won by 200 runs
Sheikh Zayed Cricket Stadium, Abu Dhabi
Umpires: Ahmed Shah Durrani (Afg) and Adrian Holdstock (SA)
Player of the match: Bilal Sami (Afg)

- Afghanistan won the toss and elected to bat.
- Bilal Sami (Afg) took his first five-wicket haul in ODIs.
