= Bilal Sami =

Afghan cricketer (born 2003)

Personal information
- Born: 21 December 2003 (age 22); Kunar, Afghanistan
- Batting: Right-handed
- Bowling: Right arm medium
- Role: Bowler

International information
- National side: Afghanistan
- ODI debut (cap 64): 21 December 2024 v Zimbabwe
- Last ODI: 17 June 2026 v India
- Only T20I (cap 63): 11 November 2025 v Qatar

Domestic team information
- Years: Team
- 2020/21: Band-e-Amir Dragons
- 2022/23: Amo Region
- 2023/24: Band-e-Amir Region
- 2023: Mah-e-Par Stars
- 2024: Hindukush Strikers
- 2024: Speenghar Tigers

Career statistics
| Competition | ODI | T20I | FC | LA |
|---|---|---|---|---|
| Matches | 3 | 1 | 11 | 30 |
| Runs scored | 2 | – | 84 | 14 |
| Batting average | – | – | 5.60 | 2.33 |
| 100s/50s | 0/0 | –/– | 0/0 | 0/0 |
| Top score | 2* | – | 15 | 6 |
| Balls bowled | 114 | 24 | 1,504 | 1,428 |
| Wickets | 5 | 1 | 25 | 54 |
| Bowling average | 29.60 | 31.00 | 39.48 | 26.66 |
| 5 wickets in innings | 1 | 0 | 1 | 1 |
| 10 wickets in match | 0 | 0 | 0 | 0 |
| Best bowling | 5/33 | 1/31 | 5/68 | 5/33 |
| Catches/stumpings | 2/– | 0/– | 5/– | 11/– |
- Source: Cricinfo, 19 July 2026

Bilal Sami (Pashto: بلال سمیع) (born 21 December 2003) is an Afghan cricketer. He made his international debut for the Afghanistan cricket team in December 2024 against Zimbabwe. In domestic cricket, he plays for the Band-e-Amir Region, Hindukush Strikers and Speenghar Tigers.

== Career ==
He made his first-class debut for Kunar Province against Kunduz Province in the 2018–19 Mirwais Nika Provincial 3-Day on 7 March 2019. He also played first class matches for Amo Region in the 2022 Ahmad Shah Abdali 4-day Tournament and played for Mah-e-Par Stars in the 2023 Ahmad Shah Abdali 4-day Tournament. He made his List A debut for Pamir Legends against Maiwand Defenders in the 2022 Green Afghanistan One Day Cup on 8 May 2022. He also played List A matches for Band-e-Amir Region in the 2023 Ghazi Amanullah Khan Regional One Day Tournament and Hindukush Strikers in the 2024 Ghazi Amanullah Khan Regional One Day Tournament. He made his T20 debut for Band-e-Amir Dragons against Kabul Eagles in the 2020 Shpageeza Cricket League on 12 September 2020. He also played Twenty20 matches for Mis Ainak Knights in the 2022 Shpageeza Cricket League, for Band-e-Amir Dragons in the 2024 Qosh Tepa National T20 Cup and for the Speenghar Tigers in the 2024 Shpageeza Cricket League.

In December 2021, he was named in Afghanistan's squad for the 2022 Under-19 Cricket World Cup. He picked 4 wickets and his best bowling figure was 2/33 against Sri Lanka.

In March 2024, he was named in Afghanistan's ODI squad against Ireland. Then in September 2024, he selected to ODI squad against South Africa but he didn't make debut. He made his One Day International debut on his birthday, against Zimbabwe on 21 December 2024. He took his maiden five-wicket haul in ODIs on 14 October 2025 against Bangladesh in the 3rd ODI of the series.
