= Muhammad Riaz =

Muhammad or Mohammad Riaz may refer to:

- Muhammad Riaz Khan, Pakistan Army general
- Muhammad Riaz (footballer, born 1970)
- Mohammad Riaz (cricketer)
- Muhammad Riaz (footballer, born 1996)
- Mohammed Riaz, Indian field hockey captain
