= National T20 Cup (Afghanistan) =

Cricket competition in Afghanistan

- Countries: Afghanistan
- Administrator: Afghanistan Cricket Board
- Format: Twenty20
- First edition: 2024
- Latest edition: 2026
- Tournament format: Double round-robin, and final
- Number of teams: 5
- Current champion: Boost Region (1st title)
- Most successful: Band-e-Amir Region; Hindukush Strikers; Boost Region (1 title each)

The National T20 Cup, is a domestic Twenty20 cricket competition in Afghanistan, organized by the Afghanistan Cricket Board and first contested during the 2024 season.

== History ==
The League was established in 2024 titled as Qosh Tepa National T20 Cup. Five regional teams participated in the event and it was a successful initiative by Afghanistan Cricket Board. The champion of the first league was Band-e-Amir Region for the inaugural edition of the tournament.

== Format ==
The tournament is held as a double round-robin format with each team playing each other twice, once at its home ground and the other leg away.

== List of teams participated in National T20 cup ==
The following teams participated in the tournament.

Location of Qosh Tepa National T20 Cup teams

- Mis Ainak Region
- Band-e-Amir Region
- Speenghar Region
- Amo Region
- Boost Region

Team	Region	Provinces	Home Ground	Debut	Seasons won
Amo Region	Amo	Balkh, Faryab, Jowzjan, Samangan, Sar-e Pol	Balkh Cricket Stadium, Mazar-i-Sharif	2024	
Band-e-Amir Region	Band-e-Amir	Ghazni, Bamyan, Daykundi, Maidan Wardak	Ghazni Cricket Ground, Ghazni	2024	2024
Boost Region	Boost	Kandahar, Helmand, Nimroz, Uruzgan, Zabul	Kandahar International Cricket Stadium, Kandahar	2024	2026
Mis Ainak Region	Mis Ainak	Khost, Logar, Paktia, Paktika	Khost Cricket Stadium, Khost	2024	
Speen Ghar Region	Speen Ghar	Nangarhar, Kapisa, Kunar, Laghman, Nuristan	Ghazi Amanullah International Cricket Stadium, Jalalabad	2024	

- The following teams took part in the 2nd edition of National T20 Cup.

Team	Debut	Last	Captain	Win
Hindukush Strikers	2025	2025	Mohammad Ishaq	2025
Mah-e-Par Stars	2025	2025	Hazratullah Zazai	
Miawand Champions	2025	2025	Najibullah Zadran	
Pamir Legends	2025	2025	Nangialai Kharoti	

== Winners ==
The following teams have won the tournament:

Season	Winner	Runner-up	Result	Final venue
2024	Band-e-Amir Region; 195/5 (20 overs)	Mis Ainak Region; 173 (19.4 overs)	Band-e-Amir Region won by 23 runs (Scorecard)	Kabul International Cricket Stadium
2025	Hindukush Strikers; 98/9 (19.5 overs)	Pamir Legends; 97 (18.5 overs)	Hindukush Strikers won by 1 wicket (Scorecard)	Kunduz Cricket Ground
2026	Boost Region; 217/5 (18 overs)	Mis Ainak Region; 211/4 20 (overs)	Boost Region won by 5 wickets (Scorecard)	Kunduz Cricket Ground
