= Band-e-Amir Region =

Afghanistan domestic cricket team

Personnel
- Captain: Hashmatullah Shahidi
- Coach: TBC

Team information
- Founded: 2017
- Capacity: 14,000

History
- Mirwais Nika 3-Day Tournament wins: 0
- Ghazi Amanullah Khan Regional One Day Tournament wins: 2
- Qosh Tepa National T20 Cup wins: 0
T20 kit

The Band-e-Amir Region are one of five Afghanistan men's first-class cricket teams that make up Afghanistan Cricket. It competes in the Mirwais Nika 3-Day Tournament first class (3-day) competition, Ghazi Amanullah Khan Regional One Day Tournament domestic one day competition and the Qosh Tepa National T20 Cup Twenty20 competition.

The Region represents the following provinces in the centre of Afghanistan: Ghazni, Bamyan, Daykundi, and Maidan Wardak.

== History ==
Band-e-Amir Region compete in the Ahmad Shah Abdali 4-day Tournament, which has first-class status from 2017 onwards, They also play in the Ghazi Amanullah Khan Regional One Day Tournament, which was granted List A status from 2017.

Band-e-Amir Region take part in the Qosh Tepa National T20 Cup, the first edition of which will be held in April 2024.

== Squads ==
- Hashmatullah Shahidi (c)
- Ikram Ali Khail
- Khalid Ahmadzai
- Riaz Hassan
- Sediq Atal
- Mohammad Haroon
- Bahar Ali Shinwari
- Asif Musazai
- Nisar Wahdat
- Islam Zazai
- Karim Janat
- Shams Ur Rahman
- Amir Hamza
- Arab Gul Momand
- Allah Mohammad Ghazanfar
- Bilal Sami
- Wafadar Momand
- Nijat Masood
- Khalil Ahmad

== Hounors ==
- Ghazi Amanullah Khan Regional One Day Tournament
- Mirwais Nika 3-Day Tournament
- Qosh Tepa National T20 Cup (1)
  - 2024
- Ahmad Shah Abdali 4-day Tournament
