= Haqmal Arya =

Afghan cricketer (born 1999)

Personal information
- Born: 3 February 1999 (age 27); Paktia, Afghanistan
- Source: Cricinfo, 9 November 2017

Haqmal Arya (born 3 February 1999) is an Afghan cricketer. He made his first-class debut for Mis Ainak Region in the 2017–18 Ahmad Shah Abdali 4-day Tournament on 7 November 2017.
