= Amo Region =

Afghanistan domestic cricket team

Personnel
- Captain: Gulbadin Naib
- Coach: TBC

Team information
- Founded: 2017
- Capacity: 14,000

History
- Mirwais Nika 3-Day Tournament wins: 0
- Ghazi Amanullah Khan Regional One Day Tournament wins: 2
- Qosh Tepa National T20 Cup wins: 0
T20 kit

The Amo Region are one of five Afghanistan men's first-class cricket teams that make up Afghanistan Cricket. It competes in the Mirwais Nika 3-Day Tournament first class (3-day) competition, Ghazi Amanullah Khan Regional One Day Tournament domestic one day competition and the Qosh Tepa National T20 Cup Twenty20 competition.

The regional side represents the following provinces in the north of Afghanistan: Balkh, Faryab, Jowzjan, Samangan, and Sar-i-Pul. The team is named after the Amo, a river in northern Afghanistan and Central Asia.

== History ==
Amo Region compete in the Ahmad Shah Abdali 4-day Tournament, which has first-class status from 2017 onwards, They also play in the Ghazi Amanullah Khan Regional One Day Tournament, which was granted List A status from 2017.

Amo Region take part in the Qosh Tepa National T20 Cup, the first edition of which will be held in April 2024.

== Squads ==
- Gulbadin Naib (c)
- Mohammad Ishaq
- Abdul Had
- Abdul Malik
- Mohammad Akram
- Javed Ahmadzai
- Darwish Rasooli
- Ijaz Ahmad Mehri
- Hayat Nasiri
- Ijaz Ahmad Ahmadzai
- Allah Noor Nasiri
- Sharafuddin Ashraf
- Zahir Pakteen
- Izharulhaq Naveed
- Abdul Rahman
- Saleem Safi
- Kamil Kakar
- Mohammad Gul
- Mujeeb Ur Rahman

== Hounors ==
- Ghazi Amanullah Khan Regional One Day Tournament
- Mirwais Nika 3-Day Tournament
- Qosh Tepa National T20 Cup
- Ahmad Shah Abdali 4-day Tournament
