= Muhammad Riaz (footballer, born 1970) =

Pakistani footballer (born 1970)

Personal information
- Full name: Muhammad Riaz
- Date of birth: 21 November 1970 (age 55)
- Place of birth: Lahore, Pakistan
- Position: Defender

Senior career*
Years	Team	Apps	(Gls)
1990s	Punjab Province		

International career
1991	Pakistan	3	(0)
- * Club domestic league appearances and goals

Muhammad Riaz (Urdu: محمد ریاض; born 21 November 1970) is a former Pakistani footballer who played as a defender during the 1990s for the Punjab football team, he also played in the 1991 South Asian Games, helping Pakistan win back-to-back titles.

== Club career ==
Riaz played for the Punjab football team during the 1990s. He played a cruical role in their win for the 1990 National Football Championship, In which they participated under the name Punjab Reds.

== International career ==
Riaz was selected for the 1991 South Asian Games, where he helped Pakistan win their second South Asian Games title. In the tournament, he featured in all three matches for the national team.

== Honours ==
=== Punjab ===
- National Football Championship
  - Winners (1): 1990

=== Pakistan ===
- South Asian Games:
  - Winners (1): 1991
