= Ijaz Ul Haq =

Afghan cricketer (born 2000)

Personal information
- Born: 20 May 2000 (age 26)
- Source: ESPNcricinfo, 16 February 2019

Ijaz Ul Haq (born 20 May 2000) is an Afghan cricketer. He made his first-class debut for Kunar Province in the 2018–19 Mirwais Nika Provincial 3-Day tournament on 15 February 2019.
