= Sri Ramachandra Centre for Sports Science =

Sporting facility in Chennai, India

Sri Ramachandra Centre for Sports Science is a sporting facility located in Chennai. It is a centre approved by the cricket's governing body International Cricket Council to conduct bowling trials specifically with the intention of monitoring the bowling action of the bowlers and to ascertain a clarity and thought process on whether the bowlers can make themselves available again for selections once they clear the air and prove their mettle by adjusting their bowling actions to justify the basic criteria that is pertinent to the bowlers to sustain in international cricket for a foreseeable future. It is apparently built up as a typical ultra-modern facility which remains as the only ICC accreditation in Asia for spotting suspected illegal bowling action.

== History ==
In 2014, the International Cricket Council declared that the Sri Ramachandra Centre for Sports Science was ideally fit and tailor made to conduct laboratory tests and examinations in order to verify bowling actions of bowlers in case if the bowlers face the prospect of concerns pertaining to chucking, throwing the ball by means of extending the elbow to a greater extent exceeding the bare minimum criteria of 15 degree. In around 2019, the Sri Ramachandra Centre for Sports Science entered the procedure manual to renew the accreditation with the International Cricket Council to further extend the contract by negotiating for a fresh term of five years.

In February 2019, Sri Lankan premium offspinner Akila Dananjaya underwent a comprehensive trial and error process at the Sri Ramachandra Centre for Sports Science, where he eventually had his bowling action tested and analysed in its biomechanical facility. Akila Dananjaya was asked to rectify and remodel his bowling action at the Sri Ramachandra Centre for Sports Science in order to make himself available again to play all forms of cricket, after his action had cast doubts regarding the legitimacy and genuiness of his runup when completing his bowling action in his follow-through which was first observed by the match officials and on-field umpires, during a three-match test series between Sri Lanka and England played in November 2018 in Sri Lankan soil.

In 2023, Indian actor turned politician Udhayanidhi Stalin assured, guaranteed and promised that he spearheaded in the culmination of a fruitful Memorandum of Understanding with the Sri Ramachandra Centre for Sports Science in order to facilitate training facilities for Tamil Nadu based sportspeople.

In December 2024, veteran Bangladeshi all-rounder Shakib Al Hasan eventually underwent the methodical process at the Sri Ramachandra Centre for Sports Science where he entered the independent reassessment test in which he failed to get his act right, as his elbow had extended the 15 degree on numerous occasions. He was called out for his bowling action during his short-lived County Cricket stint where he was believed to have exceeded the maximum permitted elbow extension of 15 degrees during when he was engaged in bowling his traditional left arm spin.
