= Barakatullah Ibrahimzai =

Afghan cricketer (born 2006)

Personal information
- Born: 21 March 2006 (age 20) ghazni
- Source: Cricinfo, 2 May 2018

Barakatullah Ibrahimzai (born 21 March 2006) is an Afghan cricketer. He made his first-class debut for Mis Ainak Region in the 2017–18 Ahmad Shah Abdali 4-day Tournament on 29 April 2018, and his List A debut, also for Mis Ainak, in the 2023 Ghazi Amanullah Khan Regional One Day Tournament on 3 November 2023.
