= Mis Ainak Region =

Afghanistan domestic cricket team

Personnel
- Captain: Ibrahim Zadran
- Coach: TBC

Team information
- Founded: 2017
- Capacity: 14,000

History
- Mirwais Nika 3-Day Tournament wins: 0
- Ghazi Amanullah Khan Regional One Day Tournament wins: 2
- Qosh Tepa National T20 Cup wins: 0
T20 kit

The Mis Ainak Region are one of five Afghanistan men's first-class cricket teams that make up Afghanistan Cricket.It competes in the Mirwais Nika 3-Day Tournament first class (3-day) competition, Ghazi Amanullah Khan Regional One Day Tournament domestic one day competition and the Qosh Tepa National T20 Cup Twenty20 competition.

The region represents the following provinces in the southeast of Afghanistan, to the south of the capital Kabul: Khost, Logar, Paktia and Paktika. The team is named after Mes Aynak, an archaeological site in Logar Province.

== History ==
The Mis Ainak Region competes in the Ahmad Shah Abdali 4-day Tournament, which has had first-class status since 2017. The team also participates in the Ghazi Amanullah Khan Regional One Day Tournament, which was granted List A status in 2017.

The Mis Ainak Region takes part in the Qosh Tepa National T20 Cup, the first edition of which will be held in April 2024.

== Hounors ==
- Ghazi Amanullah Khan Regional One Day Tournament
- Mirwais Nika 3-Day Tournament
- Qosh Tepa National T20 Cup
