= Naseerullah (Afghan cricketer) =

Afghan cricketer (born 2002)

Personal information
- Born: 11 October 2002 (age 24)
- Source: Cricinfo, 16 February 2019

Naseerullah (born 11 October 2002) is an Afghan cricketer. He made his first-class debut for Khost Province in the 2018–19 Mirwais Nika Provincial 3-Day tournament on 15 February 2019.
