= Shahidullah (cricketer) =

Afghan cricketer

Shahidullah Kamal
Personal information
- Full name: Shahidullah Kamal
- Born: 6 February 1999 (age 27); Khost, Afghanistan
- Batting: Left-handed
- Bowling: Left-arm orthodox
- Role: Batting all-rounder

International information
- National side: Afghanistan (2021–present)
- Test debut (cap 24): 10 March 2021 v Zimbabwe
- Last Test: 2 January 2025 v Zimbabwe
- ODI debut (cap 51): 21 January 2022 v Netherlands
- Last ODI: 26 August 2023 v Pakistan
- ODI shirt no.: 25
- T20I debut (cap 52): 4 October 2023 v Sri Lanka
- Last T20I: 22 January 2026 v West Indies
- T20I shirt no.: 25

Career statistics
Competition	Test	ODI	T20I	FC
Matches	3	3	7	36
Runs scored	63	39	104	2,916
Batting average	21.00	13.00	26.00	53.01
100s/50s	0/0	0/0	0/0	10/12
Top score	29*	37	49*	189
Balls bowled	30	18	18	1,690
Wickets	0	0	1	22
Bowling average	–	–	31.00	46.18
5 wickets in innings	–	–	0	0
10 wickets in match	–	–	0	0
Best bowling	–	–	1/13	3/26
Catches/stumpings	0/–	2/–	4/–	31/–
Medal record
Representing Afghanistan
Men's Cricket
Asian Games
Silver medal – second place	2022 Hangzhou	Team
- Source: Cricinfo, 19 July 2026

Shahidullah Kamal (Pashto: شاهدالله کمال) (born 6 February 1999) is an Afghan cricketer. He made his List A debut for Afghanistan A against Zimbabwe A during their tour to Zimbabwe on 27 January 2017. He was named in Afghanistan's squad for the 2014 Under-19 Cricket World Cup. He made his international debut for the Afghanistan cricket team in March 2021, in a Test match against Zimbabwe.

== Career ==
A batting all-rounder, Shahidullah made his Twenty20 debut for Band-e-Amir Dragons in the 2017 Shpageeza Cricket League on 12 September 2017. He made his first-class debut for Mis Ainak Region in the 2017–18 Ahmad Shah Abdali 4-day Tournament on 19 November 2017. He was the leading run-scorer for Mis Ainak Region in the 2018 Ahmad Shah Abdali 4-day Tournament, with 663 runs in eight matches.

In September 2018, Shahidullah was named in Kabul's squad in the first edition of the Afghanistan Premier League tournament. In December 2018, he was named in Afghanistan's under-23 team for the 2018 ACC Emerging Teams Asia Cup.

In August 2019, Shahidullah was named in Afghanistan's Twenty20 International (T20I) squad for the 2019–20 Bangladesh Tri-Nation Series. In November 2019, he was named in Afghanistan's squad for the 2019 ACC Emerging Teams Asia Cup in Bangladesh. In February 2021, he was named in Afghanistan's Test squad for their series against Zimbabwe. He made his Test debut for Afghanistan, against Zimbabwe, on 10 March 2021.

In July 2021, Shahidullah was named in Afghanistan's One Day International (ODI) squad for their series against Pakistan. In January 2022, he was named in Afghanistan's ODI squad for their series against the Netherlands in Qatar. He made his ODI debut on 21 January 2022, for Afghanistan against the Netherlands.
