= Ghazi Amanullah Khan Regional One Day Tournament =

Cricket tournament in Afghanistan

- Countries: Afghanistan
- Administrator: Afghanistan Cricket Board
- Format: List A cricket
- First edition: 2017
- Latest edition: 2026
- Next edition: 2027
- Tournament format: Round-robin
- Number of teams: 8
- Current champion: Spin Ghar Region (2nd title)
- Most successful: Mis Ainak Region (4 titles)
- Most runs: Darwish Rasooli (2172)
- Most wickets: Zahir Khan (87)
- Website: http://www.cricket.af/

The Ghazi Amanullah Khan Regional One Day Tournament is a cricket tournament organized by the Afghanistan Cricket Board (ACB) that forms part of the Afghanistan domestic cricket season. Starting from the 2017 season, following announcements from the ICC earlier in the same year, the tournament is recognized with List A status. The first ever domestic List A matches played in Afghanistan took place at the start of the 2017 edition of the Ghazi Amanullah Khan Regional One Day Tournament on 10 August 2017 at Khost Cricket Stadium, Khost. It is named after Afghan King Amanullah Khan. The winner of the first tournament was Spin Ghar Region.

== Teams ==
The Ghazi Amanullah Khan Regional One Day Tournament features the eight regional sides of Afghanistan, each of which represents a number of provinces. Kabul Region, the sixth side that features in Afghanistan's first-class (Ahmad Shah Abdali 4-day Tournament) and Twenty20 (Shpageeza Cricket League) tournaments did not compete in the one-day tournament in 2017. In 2021, two new sides, Hindukush Region and Pamir Region were added.

Name	Home ground	Franchise name
Amo Region	Balkh Cricket Stadium, Mazar-i-Sharif	Sharks
Band-e-Amir Region	Ghazni Cricket Ground, Ghazni	Dragons
Boost Region	Kandahar International Cricket Stadium, Kandahar	Defenders
Hindukush Region	Herat Cricket Ground, Herat	Stars
Kabul Region	Alokozay Kabul International Cricket Ground, Kabul	Eagles
Mis Ainak Region	Khost Cricket Stadium, Khost	Knights
Pamir Region	Kunduz Cricket Ground, Kunduz	Zalmi
Spin Ghar Region	Ghazi Amanullah International Cricket Stadium, Jalalabad	Tigers

== Winner ==
- 2017 Speen Ghar Region
- 2018 Boost Region
- 2019 Mis Ainak Region
- 2020 Mis Ainak Region
- 2021 Mis Ainak Region
- 2023 Boost Region
- 2024 Hindukush Strikers
- 2025 Mis Ainak Region
- 2026 Spin Ghar Region

== See also ==
- Afghanistan Cricket Board
- Cricket in Afghanistan
- Green Afghanistan One Day Cup

== Broadcasting ==
Afghanistan Cricket Board (ACB) and the Radio-Television of Afghanistan (RTA) have signed a Memorandum of Understanding (MoU) for the production and broadcast of the Ghazi Amanullah Khan Regional List A Tournament 2023.
