= Mohammad Riaz (cricketer) =

Afghan cricketer

Personal information
- Full name: Mohammad Riaz
- Batting: Right-handed
- Bowling: Right-arm medium-fast

Domestic team information
- Years: Team
- 2017–present: Band-e-Amir Region
- Source: Cricinfo, 11 August 2017

Mohammad Riaz is an Afghan cricketer. He made his List A debut for Band-e-Amir Region in the 2017 Ghazi Amanullah Khan Regional One Day Tournament on 11 August 2017.
