= Allah Ghazanfar =

Afghan cricketer (born 2006)

Personal information
- Full name: Allah Mohammad Ghazanfar
- Born: 20 March 2006 (age 20); Paktia Province, Afghanistan
- Height: 6 ft 2 in (188 cm)
- Batting: Right-handed
- Bowling: Right arm off spin
- Role: Bowler

International information
- National side: Afghanistan (2024–present)
- Only Test (cap 34): 26 December 2024 v Zimbabwe
- ODI debut (cap 59): 7 March 2024 v Ireland
- Last ODI: 20 June 2026 v India
- T20I debut (cap 59): 2 September 2025 v Pakistan
- Last T20I: 11 November 2025 v Qatar

Domestic team information
- Years: Team
- 2022: Mis Ainak Knights
- 2025: Derbyshire
- 2025: Antigua & Barbuda Falcons
- 2026: Mumbai Indians

Career statistics
| Competition | Test | ODI | T20I | FC |
|---|---|---|---|---|
| Matches | 1 | 17 | 5 | 1 |
| Runs scored | 6 | 61 | 7 | 6 |
| Batting average | 6.00 | 7.62 | 2.33 | 6.00 |
| 100s/50s | 0/0 | 0/0 | 0/0 | 0/0 |
| Top score | 4 | 31* | 7 | 6 |
| Balls bowled | 218 | 655 | 96 | 218 |
| Wickets | 4 | 24 | 2 | 4 |
| Bowling average | 40.25 | 20.75 | 48.00 | 40.25 |
| 5 wickets in innings | 0 | 2 | 0 | 0 |
| 10 wickets in match | 0 | 0 | 0 | 0 |
| Best bowling | 3/127 | 6/26 | 1/9 | 3/127 |
| Catches/stumpings | 1/– | 1/– | 2/– | 1/– |
- Source: ESPNcricinfo, 19 July 2026

Allah Mohammad Ghazanfar (Pashto: الله محمد غضنفر) (born 20 March 2006), known as Allah Ghazanafar or simply AM Ghazanfar, is an Afghan cricketer, who has represented the Afghanistan cricket team. He has played for Mis Ainak Knights in the Afghan Shpageeza Cricket League, Derbyshire and Rawalpindi Raiders in the Pakistan Junior League.

He was selected but did not make appearances for Colombo Strikers for the 2024 Lanka Premier League, the Kolkata Knight Riders for the 2024 Indian Premier League and the Mumbai Indians for the 2025 Indian Premier League.

== Personal life ==
Ghazanfar is from Paktia Province, Afghanistan. He has five older brothers, and as of 2022, he lived in Kabul.

== Domestic and franchise career ==
Ghazanfar started playing cricket in 2020 during the COVID-19 pandemic. He played for the Saleem Karwan Cricket Academy in Kabul from the age of 13. He began as a fast bowler, and is now an off-spinner. He bowls finger spin, due to him receiving teachings on spin bowling by former Afghanistan captain Dawlat Ahmadzai. His bowling technique has been compared to Afghan international Mujeeb Zadran. Ghazanfar trains at the Mirza Mohammad Katawazai Cricket Centre in Kabul, and previously trained with the Afghanistan national under-19 cricket team.

Ghazanfar has played for the Mis Ainak Knights in the Afghan Shpageeza Cricket League; his first appearance was in July 2022, having been called into the team the day beforehand to replace Mir Hamza. On his debut, he took 1/27 in 4 overs, and he took four wickets in his second appearance. He was awarded the Player of the Match awards in both matches. In 2022, he played for Rawalpindi Raiders in the Pakistan Junior League; he was one of 12 overseas players in the competition. He was included in the draft for the 2022–23 Big Bash League season, but was not selected. He was included in the Far Western United team for the inaugural season of the Nepal T20 League.

At the age of 15, Ghazanfar was included in the auction for the 2023 Indian Premier League. He was the youngest player entered into that year's auction, and his base price for the auction was ₹20 lakh (US$21,000). He went unsold in the auction. In 2024, he played in the Abu Dhabi T10.

In March 2024, Ghazanfar was signed by Kolkata Knight Riders to play for them in the 2024 Indian Premier League at a base price of ₹20 lakh (US$21,000), as a replacement for Mujeeb Ur Rahman. A few days beforehand, Mumbai Indians had tried to sign him to be a nets bowler, but he was unable to get a visa to perform that role for them. He was selected by Colombo Strikers for the 2024 Lanka Premier League season. He was drafted to play for Rangpur Riders in the 2025 Bangladesh Premier League..

In November 2024, Ghazanfar signed for the Mumbai Indians for ₹4.80 crore (US$510,000) for the 2025 Indian Premier League. Due to an injury, he was ruled out of the tournament and replaced by Mujeeb Ur Rahman. In March 2025, he signed to play for Derbyshire County Cricket Club in that year's T20 Blast. He took 16 wickets in 14 matches in the T20 Blast, including figures of 2/5 from 4 overs against Yorkshire. He signed for the Antigua & Barbuda Falcons for the 2025 Caribbean Premier League.

== International career ==
In 2023, Ghazanfar played for Junior Champions (a team of representatives from the Afghanistan under-19 national team) in the Green Afghanistan One Day Cup.

He was part of the 15-man Afghanistan squad for the 2024 Under-19 Cricket World Cup. In the game against New Zealand, he picked up 3 wickets for 29 runs.

Ghazanfar made his debut for the Afghanistan senior team in their series against Ireland, at the age of at the age of 16 years and 236 days. In his first 11 One Day International matches, Ghazanfar took two five-wicket hauls. He was the third youngest cricketer to take a six-wicket haul in an ODI, and third player to take two five-wicket hauls before the age of 19.

Ghazanfar made his Test debut in December 2024 against Zimbabwe, replacing the injured Rashid Khan. It was also his debut first-class match.

He was included in the Afghanistan squad for the 2025 Asia Cup.
