= Ikram Alikhil =

Afghan cricketer

Personal information
- Born: 29 September 2000 (age 26); Kabul, Afghanistan
- Batting: Left-handed
- Role: Wicket-keeper batter

International information
- National side: Afghanistan
- Test debut (cap 13): 15 March 2019 v Ireland
- Last Test: 2 February 2024 v Sri Lanka
- ODI debut (cap 45): 2 March 2019 v Ireland
- Last ODI: 14 October 2025 v Bangladesh
- ODI shirt no.: 46

Career statistics
Competition	Test	ODI	FC	LA
Matches	2	32	27	82
Runs scored	29	386	1,348	1,585
Batting average	9.66	21.44	39.64	29.35
100s/50s	0/0	0/3	3/6	1/9
Top score	21	86	142	100
Catches/stumpings	5/1	23/5	71/7	78/9
- Source: Cricinfo, 19 July 2026

Ikram Alikhil (Pashto: اکرام فيضي عليخېل; born 29 September 2000) is an Afghan cricketer. He made his international debut for Afghanistan in March 2019.

== Domestic and U19 career ==
He made his Twenty20 debut for Band-e-Amir Dragons in the 2017 Shpageeza Cricket League on 14 September 2017. Prior to his T20 debut, he was part of Afghanistan's squad for the 2016 Under-19 Cricket World Cup. He also scored an unbeaten century in the final of the 2017 ACC Under-19 Asia Cup and helped Afghanistan to win their maiden ACC Under-19 Cup title.

In December 2017, he was named in Afghanistan's squad for the 2018 Under-19 Cricket World Cup.

He made his first-class debut for Speen Ghar Region in the 2018 Ahmad Shah Abdali 4-day Tournament on 1 March 2018. He made his List A debut for Speen Ghar Region in the 2018 Ghazi Amanullah Khan Regional One Day Tournament on 10 July 2018.

In September 2018, he was named in Balkh's squad in the first edition of the Afghanistan Premier League tournament.

== International career ==
In December 2018, he was named in Afghanistan's under-23 team for the 2018 ACC Emerging Teams Asia Cup.

In February 2019, he was named in Afghanistan's Test and One Day International (ODI) squads for their series against Ireland in India. He made his ODI debut against Ireland on 2 March 2019. He made his Test debut for Afghanistan against Ireland on 15 March 2019.

On 6 June 2019, he was added to Afghanistan's squad for the 2019 Cricket World Cup. He replaced Mohammad Shahzad, who was ruled out of the tournament due to a knee injury. He scored a fifty against England in his first match of the 2023 Cricket World Cup which Afghanistan won by 69 runs.
