= Izatullah Safi =

Afghan cricket umpire (born 1978)

Personal information
- Born: 19 May 1980 (age 46); Kunar Province, Afghanistan
- Role: Umpire

Umpiring information
- ODIs umpired: 9 (2017–2025)
- T20Is umpired: 28 (2018–2026)
- Source: ESPNcricinfo, 15 March 2023

Izatullah Safi (born 19 May 1980) is a cricket umpire from Afghanistan, who has officiated in Afghanistan's domestic matches and several international matches. He stood in his first One Day International (ODI) match, between Afghanistan and Ireland, on 7 December 2017. His Twenty20 International (T20I) umpiring debut, on 6 February 2018, was in a match between Afghanistan and Zimbabwe.

== See also ==
- List of One Day International cricket umpires
- List of Twenty20 International cricket umpires
