= Sharafuddin Ashraf =

Afghan cricketer (born 1995)

Personal information
- Born: 10 January 1995 (age 31); Kabul, Afghanistan
- Height: 1.87 m (6 ft 2 in)
- Batting: Right-handed
- Bowling: Slow left-arm orthodox
- Role: Bowler

International information
- National side: Afghanistan (2014–present)
- Test debut (cap 40): 20 October 2025 v Zimbabwe
- Last Test: 6 June 2026 v India
- ODI debut (cap 32): 18 July 2014 v Zimbabwe
- Last ODI: 14 February 2024 v Sri Lanka
- ODI shirt no.: 17
- T20I debut (cap 26): 9 July 2015 v Netherlands
- Last T20I: 2 November 2025 v Zimbabwe
- T20I shirt no.: 17

Career statistics
Competition	Test	ODI	T20I	FC
Matches	2	20	23	20
Runs scored	20	70	63	854
Batting average	6.66	8.75	10.50	29.44
100s/50s	0/0	0/0	0/0	1/4
Top score	11	21	18	125
Balls bowled	102	884	354	3,968
Wickets	1	13	12	99
Bowling average	65.00	50.15	36.66	18.40
5 wickets in innings	0	0	0	7
10 wickets in match	0	0	0	1
Best bowling	1/65	3/29	3/24	7/38
Catches/stumpings	0/–	6/–	4/–	18/–
Medal record
Men's cricket
Representing Afghanistan
Asian Games
Silver medal – second place	2022 Hangzhou	Team
- Source: Cricinfo, 19 July 2026

Sharafuddin Ashraf (born 10 January 1995) is an Afghan cricketer. He made his international debut for the Afghanistan cricket team in July 2014.

== Domestic career ==
In July 2018, Ashraf was the leading wicket-taker for Amo Sharks in the 2018 Ghazi Amanullah Khan Regional One Day Tournament, with twelve dismissals in five matches. He was named the player of the tournament for his all-round performance.

In September 2018, Ashraf was named in Paktia's squad in the first edition of the Afghanistan Premier League tournament.

== International career ==
He made his One Day International (ODI) debut against Zimbabwe in July 2014, and his Twenty20 International debut against the Netherlands in the 2015 ICC World Twenty20 Qualifier tournament in July 2015.

In February 2019, he was named in Afghanistan's Test squad for their one-off match against Ireland in India, but was not selected in the playing eleven. In July 2021, he was named as one of four reserve players in Afghanistan's ODI squad for their series against Pakistan. In September 2021, he was named in Afghanistan's squad for the 2021 ICC Men's T20 World Cup.
