= Darwish Rasooli =

Afghan cricketer

Personal information
- Born: 12 December 1999 (age 26); Laghman, Afghanistan
- Batting: Right-handed
- Bowling: Righ-arm off-break
- Role: Batsman

International information
- National side: Afghanistan
- ODI debut (cap 67): 17 June 2026 v India
- Last ODI: 20 June 2026 v India
- T20I debut (cap 45): 3 March 2022 v Bangladesh
- Last T20I: 19 February 2026 v Canada

Domestic team information
- Years: Team
- 2017: Mis Ainak Knights
- 2018: Balkh Legends
- 2019–present: Dhaka Dynamites
- 2025: Khulna Tigers

Career statistics
Competition	ODI	T20I	FC	LA
Matches	2	28	30	73
Runs scored	7	515	2,681	3,029
Batting average	7.00	22.39	60.93	54.08
100s/50s	0/0	0/4	10/9	10/19
Top score	6*	84	249	155
Catches/stumpings	1/–	9/–	28/0	28/0
- Source: Cricinfo, 19 July 2026

Darwish Rasooli (born 12 December 1999) is an Afghan cricketer. He made his international debut for the Afghanistan cricket team in March 2022.

== Domestic career ==
He made his List A debut for Speen Ghar Region in the 2017 Ghazi Amanullah Khan Regional One Day Tournament on 13 August 2017. Three days later, in his second List A match, he scored his first century, when he made 130 not out against Amo Region. He made his Twenty20 debut for Mis Ainak Knights in the 2017 Shpageeza Cricket League on 14 September 2017.

He was the leading run-scorer in the 2018 Ahmad Shah Abdali 4-day Tournament, finishing with 1,073 runs in eight matches. In September 2018, he was named in Balkh's squad in the first edition of the Afghanistan Premier League tournament.

== International career ==
In December 2017, he was named in Afghanistan's squad for the 2018 Under-19 Cricket World Cup.

In May 2018, he was named in Afghanistan's Twenty20 International (T20I) squad for their series against Bangladesh. In December 2018, he was named in Afghanistan's under-23 team for the 2018 ACC Emerging Teams Asia Cup. In November 2019, he was named in Afghanistan's squad for the 2019 ACC Emerging Teams Asia Cup in Bangladesh.

In February 2022, he was named in Afghanistan's Twenty20 International (T20I) squad for their series against Bangladesh. He finally made his T20I debut on 3 March 2022, against Bangladesh.
