= Mohammad Ishaq (Afghan cricketer) =

Afghan cricketer (born 2005)

Personal information
- Full name: Mohammad Ishaq Shirzad
- Born: 1 February 2005 (age 21); Nangahar, Afghanistan
- Batting: Right-handed
- Role: Batsman, Wicket-keeper

International information
- National side: Afghanistan
- T20I debut (cap 56): 21 February 2024 v Sri Lanka
- Last T20I: 11 November 2025 v Qatar

Domestic team information
- Years: Team
- 2018–2023: Speenghar Tigers
- 2023–present: Boost Defenders

Career statistics
| Competition | T20I | FC | LA | T20 |
|---|---|---|---|---|
| Matches | 5 | 10 | 25 | 30 |
| Runs scored | 76 | 366 | 654 | 343 |
| Batting average | 19.00 | 62.18 | 43.60 | 19.05 |
| 100s/50s | 0/0 | 0/2 | 0/5 | 0/0 |
| Top score | 32 | 96 | 99* | 47* |
| Catches/stumpings | 2/– | 19/3 | 15/5 | 9/3 |
- Source: Cricinfo, 24 March 2025

Mohammad Ishaq (Pashto: محمد اسحاق) (born 1 February 2005) is an Afghan cricketer. He made his first-class debut for Speen Ghar Region in the 2018 Ahmad Shah Abdali 4-day Tournament on 15 April 2018. He made his List A debut for Speen Ghar Region in the 2018 Ghazi Amanullah Khan Regional One Day Tournament on 25 July 2018.

In December 2019, he was named in Afghanistan's squad for the 2020 Under-19 Cricket World Cup. He was a member of the Afghanistan team for the 2022 ICC Under-19 Cricket World Cup in the West Indies.

In May 2024, he was named in Afghanistan's squad for the 2024 ICC Men's T20 World Cup tournament.
