= Band-e-Amir Dragons =

Cricket team in Afghanistan

- بند امير ښاماران; Band-e-Amīr Khāmārān / Shāmārān

Personnel
- Captain: (Afghanistan) Hashmatullah Shahidi
- Coach: (Afghanistan) Zamir Khan
- Owner: Paragon Group

Team information
- Founded: 2013; 13 years ago
- Home ground: Ghazni Cricket Ground, Ghazni

History
- Shpageeza wins: 1 (2017)
- Qosh Tepa wins: 1 (2024)

Band-e-Amir Dragons (Pashto: بند امير ښاماران Band-e-Amīr Khāmārān / Shāmārān; Dari: بند امیر شاماران) or Band-e-Amir Region is one of eight regional first-class cricket teams in Afghanistan. In the 2017 Shpageeza team auction, the Band-e-Amir Dragons team was bought by Paragon Business Group, a finance and investment company, and played as the Paragon Band-e-Amir Dragons in that edition due to sponsorship reasons. The Region represents the following provinces in the centre of Afghanistan: Ghazni, Bamyan, Daykundi, and Maidan Wardak. The team is named after Band-e Amir, a series of six deep blue lakes in Bamyan Province.

Band-e-Amir Region compete in the Ahmad Shah Abdali 4-day Tournament, which has had first-class status from 2017 onwards. In October 2017, they lost their opening fixture of the tournament, against Mis Ainak Region, by 262 runs.

They also play in the Ghazi Amanullah Khan Regional One Day Tournament, which was granted List A status from 2017. and the Afghan Shpageeza Cricket League Twenty20 competition (which has Twenty20 status from 2017) using the name Band-e-Amir Dragons. They also take part in the Qosh Tepa National T20 Cup, the first edition of which will be held in April 2024.

== Honours ==
- Shpageeza Cricket League1
  - Winners: 2017
