= Speenghar Tigers =

Cricket team in Afghanistan

- سپين غر زمريان; Spīn Ghar Zmaryān

Personnel
- Captain: (Afghanistan) Rashid Khan
- Coach: (Afghanistan) Dawlat Ahmadzai

Team information
- Founded: 2013; 13 years ago
- Home ground: Ghazi Amanullah International Cricket Stadium, Jalalabad
- Capacity: 14,000

History
- Shpageeza wins: 3 (2013, 2015, 2022)
- GAK wins: 1 (2018)

Speenghar Tigers (Pashto: سپين غر زمريان Spīn Ghar Zmaryān) or Speenghar Region (alternative spelling: Spin Ghar) is one of eight regional first-class cricket teams in Afghanistan. The region represents the following provinces in the east of Afghanistan, to the east of the capital Kabul: Nangarhar, Laghman, Kapisa, Kunar and Nuristan. The team is named after Spīn Ghar, a mountain range in Afghanistan and Pakistan.

Speenghar Region compete in the Ahmad Shah Abdali 4-day Tournament, which has had first-class status from 2017 onwards. In October 2017, they won their opening fixture of the tournament, against Amo Region, by an innings and 46 runs.

They also play in the Ghazi Amanullah Khan Regional One Day Tournament, which was granted List A status from 2017, and the Afghan Shpageeza Cricket League Twenty20 competition (which has Twenty20 status from 2017) using the name Speenghar Tigers. They also take part in the Qosh Tepa National T20 Cup, the first edition of which will be held in April 2024.

== Honours ==
- Shpageeza Cricket League
  - Winners: 2013, 2015, 2022
