= Mis Ainak Knights =

Cricket team in Afghanistan

Mis-e-Ainak Knights
- مس عينک اتلان; Mis Ainak Atalān

Personnel
- Captain: (Afghanistan) Ibrahim Zadran
- Coach: (Afghanistan) Raees Ahmadzai

Team information
- Founded: 2013; 13 years ago
- Home ground: Khost Cricket Stadium, Khost
- Capacity: 6,000

History
- Shpageeza wins: 1 (2014)
- GAK wins: 3 (2019, 2020, 2021)

Mis-e-Ainak Knights (Pashto: مس عينک اتلان Mis Ainak Atalān) or Mis Ainak Region is one of eight regional first-class cricket teams in Afghanistan. The region represents the following provinces in the southeast of Afghanistan, to the south of the capital Kabul: Khost, Logar, Paktia and Paktika. The team is named after Mes Aynak, an archaeological site in Logar.

Mis Ainak Region compete in the Ahmad Shah Abdali 4-day Tournament, which has had first-class status since 2017. In October 2017, they won their opening fixture of the tournament, against Band-e-Amir Region, by 262 runs.

They also play in the Ghazi Amanullah Khan Regional One Day Tournament, which was granted List A status from 2017, and the Afghan Shpageeza Cricket League Twenty20 competition (which has Twenty20 status from 2017) using the name Mis Ainak Knights. They also take part in the Qosh Tepa National T20 Cup, the first edition of which would be held in April 2024.

== Honours ==
- Shpageeza Cricket League
  - Winners: 2014, 2019
