= 2022 Shpageeza Cricket League =

Cricket tournament

- Dates: 18 July 2022 – 5 August 2022
- Administrator: Afghanistan Cricket Board (ACB)
- Cricket format: Twenty20
- Tournament format(s): Round-robin and playoffs
- Host: Afghanistan
- Champions: Speenghar Tigers (3rd title)
- Runners-up: Boost Defenders
- Participants: 8
- Matches: 32
- Player of the series: Najibullah Zadran (Speenghar Tigers)
- Most runs: Hashmatullah Shahidi (Boost Defenders) (411)
- Most wickets: Qais Ahmad (Kabul Eagles) (14); Zia-ur-Rehman (Boost Defenders) (14)

The 2022 Shpageeza Cricket League was the eighth edition of the Shpageeza Cricket League, a professional Twenty20 cricket (T20) league established by the Afghanistan Cricket Board (ACB) in 2013, and the fourth edition to have official T20 status. It was originally scheduled to run from 10 to 25 September 2021, with the number of teams increased from six to eight. However, no tournament took place in 2021, with the Afghanistan Cricket Board (ACB) announcing that the tournament would be played in June and July 2022. The Kabul Eagles were the defending champions.

Despite Afghanistan being brought under the control of the Taliban in August 2021, reports have stated that the Taliban had no issue with cricket, with the tournament scheduled to take place as planned. The Afghanistan cricket team were scheduled to tour Sri Lanka in September 2021 to play the Pakistan cricket team. In the event of that tour not taking place as planned, the ACB stated that the T20 tournament could be brought forward. However, as a result of the logistical problems regarding travelling to Sri Lanka, the matches were moved to Pakistan, before being postponed. In the final Speenghar Tigers defeated Boost Defenders by 6 runs to win their 3rd title.

== Squads ==
Squads were announced on 11 June 2022.

Amo Sharks	Band-e-Amir Dragons	Boost Defenders	Hindukush Stars	Kabul Eagles	Mis Ainak Knights	Pamir Zalmi	Speenghar Tigers
Ihsanullah Janat (c); Darwish Rasooli; Abdul Wasi; Yousuf Zazai; Jamshid Khan; Wafadar Momand; Bahir Shah; Asghar Atal; Rahim Mangal; Abidullah Taniwal; Haji Murad Muradi; Janat Gul; Faridoon Dawoodzai; Arif Khan; Haya Khan; Juma Gul; Abdul Rashid Naseri; Kamran Hotak; Wafiullah Stanikzai; Yahya Khan; Farhad Usmani; Noor-ul-Haq; Noorullah; Salman Shinwari; Wadood; Bilal Khan; Hilal Noori	Aftab Alam (c); Rashid Khan; Karim Janat; Nijat Masood; Noor Ahmad; Mohammad Tahir Adil; Asif Musazai; Ikram Alikhil; Imran Mir; Nasir Totakhil; Farmanullah; Sediqullah Pacha; Mohammad Sardar; Irfan Safi; Suliman Arabzai; Mohabat Momand; Amanullah Rafiqi; Abdul Baqi; Naveed Obaid; Rifatullah Shinwari; Ezat Barakzai; Khalid Usman; Wali Pathan; Yasir Khan; Bakhtullah; Javeed Khan	Hashmatullah Shahidi (c); Samiullah Shinwari; Abdul Rahman; Fazalhaq Farooqi; Farhan Zakhil; Suliman Safi; Abdul Malik; Zia-ur-Rehman; Ibrahim Safi; Afsar Zazai; Asadullah Matani; Mohammad Saleem; Mohammad Wasim Mandozai; Hayatullah Nasiri; Ainuddin Kakar; Bilal Ahmad; Qasim Oryakhail; Kamil Kakar; Zafar Khan; Bilal Sayeedi; Hassan Eisakhil; Sabawoon Banoori; Sadiqullah Totakhil; Shahid Abdulrahimzai; Mohammad Gul; Munir Ahmad; Ahmad Zia; Samiullah Fazi; Shahzad Mohd.	Hazratullah Zazai (c); Hamid Hassan; Mujeeb Ur Rahman; Shabir Noori; Nisar Wahdat; Abdullah Adil; Muslim Musa; Zubaid Akbari; Fitratullah Khawari; Shamsurrahman; Zia ul Haq Eisakhil; Yousuf Shah; Jalat Musazai; Akbar Musazai; Imran Mohammadi; Usman Adil; Abdul Hadi; Parvez Amin; Almas Shirzad; Matiullah; Usman Noori; Afsar; Amir Khan; Farman; Miram Gul; Mohammad Tariq; Yahya; Yama Arab; Hizbullah Durrani; Yousuf Shah	Rahmanullah Gurbaz (c); Mohammad Nabi; Akbar Ali Khostai; Emal Shaheen; Ibrahim Zadran; Rahmanullah Zadran; Sabir Hanif; Ijaz Ahmadzai; Khalil Gurbaz; Nasim Mangal; Shahidullah Kamal; Wasim Akram; Masood Gurbaz; Ziaur Rahman; Azmatullah Omarzai; Haseebullah Lakanwal; Naveen-ul-Haq; Qais Ahmad; Wahidullah Ali; Waleed Stanekzai	Amir Hamza (c); Mohammad Shahzad; Asghar Afghan; Sediqullah Atal; Zahir Khan; Nangialai Kharoti; Gulbadin Naib; Riaz Hassan; Mir Hamza; Bilal Sami; Mohammadullah Hamkar; Allah Noor; Tariq Stanikzai; Sami Totakhil; Faisal Ahmadzai; Iftikhar Ahmed; Hanif Zardan; Bakhtarullah Atal; Khalid Zahedi; Mohammad Zahir	Shapoor Zadran (c); Noor Ali Zadran; Sayed Shirzad; Dawlat Zadran; Fazal Zazai; Waheedullah Shafaq; Ghamai Zadran; Rahmat Sahaq; Rahmat Shah; Rokhan Barakzai; Fazal Niazai; Amir Zazai; Islam Zazai; Ijaz Ahmad; Noor-ul-Haq; Majeed Alam; Popal; Zabiullah Sardarzai; Mohammadullah Hamkar; Arshad Khan; Mohammadullah Najibullah	Usman Ghani (c); Najibullah Zadran; Sharafuddin Ashraf; Batin Shah; Fareed Ahmad; Asif Afridi; Bahar Shinwari; Izharulhaq Naveed; Shawkat Zaman; Ishaq Rahimi; Yamin Ahmadzai; Tamim Surkhorodi; Mohammad Ibrahim; Abid Mohammadi; Ismat Alam; Pakhtoon Sarfaraz; Zahidullah Salmi; Farhad Momand; Mohammad Ishaq; Sajjad Ibrahim

== Standings ==
=== Points table ===
Pos	Team	Pld	W	L	NR	Pts	NRR
1	Boost Defenders (R)	7	7	0	0	14	1.522
2	Speenghar Tigers (C)	7	6	1	0	12	2.608
3	Kabul Eagles (3rd)	7	5	2	0	10	0.957
4	Mis Ainak Knights (4th)	7	3	4	0	6	1.030
5	Amo Sharks	7	3	4	0	6	−1.183
6	Band-e-Amir Dragons	7	3	4	0	6	−1.749
7	Hindukush Stars	7	1	6	0	2	−2.255
8	Pamir Zalmi	7	0	7	0	0	−1.391

Source: ESPNcricinfo
(C) Champions; (R) Runners-up

- Advanced to the qualifiers
- Advanced to the eliminator
- Eliminated from Tournament

== Fixtures ==
Match 1
18 July 2022
10:00
Scorecard

Band-e-Amir Dragons; 120 (19.4 overs)	v	Kabul Eagles; 121/4 (14.2 overs)
Farmanullah 32 (33); Azmatullah Omarzai 3/16 (3.4 overs)		Rahmanullah 36* (27); Nasir Totakhil 2/18 (3 overs)

Kabul Eagles won by 6 wickets
Kabul International Cricket Stadium
Umpires: Ahmed Shah Pakteen and Bismillah Jan Shinwari
Player of the match: Azmatullah Omarzai (Kabul Eagles)

- Kabul Eagles won the toss and elected to field.
- Irfan Safi (Band-e-Amir Dragons), Khalil Gurbaz and Masood Gurbaz (Kabul Eagles) all made their T20 debuts.

Match 2
18 July 2022
14:45
Scorecard

Mis Ainak Knights; 139/6 (20 overs)	v	Speenghar Tigers; 142/2 (18.4 overs)
Iftikhar Ahmed 55 (45); Asif Afridi 3/24 (4 overs)		Usman Ghani 66 (54); Gulbadin Naib 1/19 (3 overs)

Speenghar Tigers won by 8 wickets
Kabul International Cricket Stadium
Umpires: Ahmed Shah Durrani and Farooq Khan
Player of the match: Usman Ghani (Speenghar Tigers)

- Speenghar Tigers won the toss and elected to field.
- Allah Noor (Mis Ainak Knights), Izharulhaq Naveed and Mohammad Ishaq (Speenghar Tigers) all made their T20 debuts.

Match 3
19 July 2022
10:00
Scorecard

Amo Sharks; 147/7 (20 overs)	v	Hindukush Stars; 144/9 (20 overs)
Ihsanullah 44 (31); Muslim Musa 3/23 (4 overs)		Usman Noori 62 (38); Yousuf Zazai 5/18 (4 overs)

Amo Sharks won by 3 runs
Kabul International Cricket Stadium
Umpires: Izatullah Safi and Mahmood Kharoti
Player of the match: Yousuf Zazai (Amo Sharks)

- Hindukush Stars won the toss and elected to field.
- Abidullah Taniwal, Jamshid Khan, Kamran Hotak (Amo Sharks), Usman Noori and Yousuf Shah (Hindukush Stars) all made their T20 debuts.

Match 4
19 July 2022
14:45
Scorecard

Pamir Zalmi; 107/8 (20 overs)	v	Boost Defenders; 111/4 (18.1 overs)
Ghamai Zadran 34 (39); Mohammad Saleem 2/18 (4 overs)		Hashmatullah Shahidi 58* (50); Dawlat Zadran 1/16 (3 overs)

Boost Defenders won by 6 wickets
Kabul International Cricket Stadium
Umpires: Ahmed Shah Pakteen and Ajmal Shamolzi
Player of the match: Hashmatullah Shahidi (Boost Defenders)

- Pamir Zalmi won the toss and elected to bat.
- Arshad Khan (Pamir Zalmi) made his T20 debut.

Match 5
20 July 2022
10:00
Scorecard

Band-e-Amir Dragons; 50 (14.2 overs)	v	Mis Ainak Knights; 51/4 (8 overs)
Karim Janat 10 (14); Mir Hamza 4/9 (4 overs)		Ihsanullah 16 (13); Aftab Alam 2/14 (3 overs)

Mis Ainak Knights won by 6 wickets
Kabul International Cricket Stadium
Umpires: Bismillah Jan Shinwari and Muhammad Sabir
Player of the match: Mir Hamza (Mis Ainak Knights)

- Mis Ainak Knights won the toss and elected to field.

Match 6
20 July 2022
14:45
Scorecard

Kabul Eagles; 139/4 (20 overs)	v	Speenghar Tigers; 142/4 (14.5 overs)
Shahidullah 47* (48); Asif Afridi 1/23 (4 overs)		Najibullah Zadran 51 (31); Qais Ahmad 2/33 (4 overs)

Speenghar Tigers won by 6 wickets
Kabul International Cricket Stadium
Umpires: Ahmed Shah Durrani and Mahmood Kharoti
Player of the match: Najibullah Zadran (Speenghar Tigers)

- Speenghar Tigers won the toss and elected to field.

Match 7
21 July 2022
10:00
Scorecard

Hindukush Stars; 178/8 (20 overs)	v	Pamir Zalmi; 149/7 (20 overs)
Shabir Noori 48 (41); Sayed Shirzad 3/41 (4 overs)		Rahmat Shah 61 (46); Fitratullah Khawari 3/29 (4 overs)

Hindukush Stars won by 29 runs
Kabul International Cricket Stadium
Umpires: Ahmed Shah Pakteen and Farooq Khan
Player of the match: Fitratullah Khawari (Hindukush Stars)

- Pamir Zalmi won the toss and elected to field.
- Abdul Hadi (Hindukush Stars) made his T20 debut.

Match 8
21 July 2022
14:45
Scorecard

Amo Sharks; 96/9 (20 overs)	v	Boost Defenders; 99/1 (8.3 overs)
Haji Murad Muradi 22 (27); Abdul Rahman 4/21 (4 overs)		Hashmatullah Shahidi 29* (13); Bilal Khan 1/11 (1.1 overs)

Boost Defenders won by 9 wickets
Kabul International Cricket Stadium
Umpires: Bismillah Jan Shinwari and Izatullah Safi
Player of the match: Abdul Rahman (Boost Defenders)

- Amo Sharks won the toss and elected to bat.
- Hassan Eisakhil (Boost Defenders) made his T20 debut.

Match 9
22 July 2022
10:00
Scorecard

Pamir Zalmi; 125 (20 overs)	v	Speenghar Tigers; 129/4 (15 overs)
Noor Ali Zadran 67 (57); Izharulhaq Naveed 4/23 (4 overs)		Najibullah Zadran 83* (41); Dawlat Zadran 2/22 (4 overs)

Speenghar Tigers won by 6 wickets
Kabul International Cricket Stadium
Umpires: Ahmed Shah Durrani and Ajmal Shamolzi
Player of the match: Izharulhaq Naveed (Speenghar Tigers)

- Speenghar Tigers won the toss and elected to field.
- Amir Zazai, Mohammadullah Najibullah and Noor-ul-Haq (Pamir Zalmi) made their T20 debuts.

Match 10
22 July 2022
15:00
Scorecard

Mis Ainak Knights; 129/8 (20 overs)	v	Kabul Eagles; 133/1 (17.4 overs)
Gulbadin Naib 37 (22); Qais Ahmad 3/18 (4 overs)		Ibrahim Zadran 57* (49); Nangialai Kharoti 1/16 (3 overs)

Kabul Eagles won by 9 wickets
Kabul International Cricket Stadium
Umpires: Ahmed Shah Pakteen and Mahmood Kharoti
Player of the match: Ibrahim Zadran (Kabul Eagles)

- Kabul Eagles won the toss and elected to field.
- Khalil Ahmed (Kabul Eagles) made his T20 debut.

Match 11
23 July 2022
10:00
Scorecard

Boost Defenders; 173/4 (20 overs)	v	Hindukush Stars; 121 (19.4 overs)
Hassan Eisakhil 76 (55); Hamid Hassan 2/31 (4 overs)		Nisar Wahdat 56 (34); Fazalhaq Farooqi 3/13 (4 overs)

Boost Defenders won by 52 runs
Kabul International Cricket Stadium
Umpires: Bismillah Jan Shinwari and Farooq Khan
Player of the match: Hassan Eisakhil (Boost Defenders)

- Hindukush Stars won the toss and elected to field.

Match 12
23 July 2022
14:45
Scorecard

Band-e-Amir Dragons; 162/7 (20 overs)	v	Amo Sharks; 160/8 (20 overs)
Karim Janat 40 (32); Jamshid Khan 3/12 (2 overs)		Juma Gul 50 (48); Nijat Masood 2/3 (2 overs)

Band-e-Amir Dragons won by 2 runs
Kabul International Cricket Stadium
Umpires: Ahmed Shah Durrani and Izatullah Safi
Player of the match: Karim Janat (Band-e-Amir Dragons)

- Band-e-Amir Dragons won the toss and elected to bat.
- Asghar Atal (Amo Sharks) made his T20 debut.

Match 13
24 July 2022
10:00
Scorecard

Boost Defenders; 146/5 (20 overs)	v	Speenghar Tigers; 136/9 (20 overs)
Samiullah Shinwari 72 (55); Asif Afridi 2/7 (4 overs)		Usman Ghani 46 (39); Zia-ur-Rehman 3/10 (4 overs)

Boost Defenders won by 10 runs
Kabul International Cricket Stadium
Umpires: Ahmed Shah Pakteen and Muhammad Sabir
Player of the match: Samiullah Shinwari (Boost Defenders)

- Speenghar Tigers won the toss and elected to field.

Match 14
24 July 2022
14:45
Scorecard

Hindukush Stars; 186/8 (20 overs)	v	Band-e-Amir Dragons; 188/3 (18 overs)
Hazratullah Zazai 73 (39); Noor Ahmad 2/28 (3 overs)		Farmanullah 53* (39); Fitratullah Khawari 2/18 (4 overs)

Band-e-Amir Dragons won by 7 wickets
Kabul International Cricket Stadium
Umpires: Ajmal Shamolzi and Izatullah Safi
Player of the match: Farmanullah (Band-e-Amir Dragons)

- Band-e-Amir Dragons won the toss and elected to field.
- Akbar Musazai and Yama Arab (Hindukush Stars) made their T20 debuts.

Match 15
25 July 2022
10:00
Scorecard

Amo Sharks; 151/6 (20 overs)	v	Kabul Eagles; 152/1 (13.2 overs)
Asghar Atal 53 (47); Qais Ahmad 2/26 (4 overs)		Ibrahim Zadran 81* (37); Abidullah Taniwal 1/8 (1 over)

Kabul Eagles won by 9 wickets
Kabul International Cricket Stadium
Umpires: Farooq Khan and Mahmood Kharoti
Player of the match: Ibrahim Zadran (Kabul Eagles)

- Kabul Eagles won the toss and elected to field.
- Akbar Ali, Emal and Waleed Stanekzai (Kabul Eagles) made their T20 debuts.

Match 16
25 July 2022
14:45
Scorecard

Pamir Zalmi; 118/7 (20 overs)	v	Mis Ainak Knights; 120/4 (17.5 overs)
Majeed Alam 31 (37); Amir Hamza 3/18 (4 overs)		Iftikhar Ahmed 38* (34); Rahmat Shah 1/14 (3 overs)

Mis Ainak Knights won by 6 wickets
Kabul International Cricket Stadium
Umpires: Ahmed Shah Durrani and Ahmed Shah Pakteen
Player of the match: Amir Hamza (Mis Ainak Knights)

- Pamir Zalmi won the toss and elected to bat.
- Ijaz Ahmad and Popal (Pamir Zalmi) made their T20 debuts.

Match 17
27 July 2022
10:00
Scorecard

Boost Defenders; 128/5 (20 overs)	v	Band-e-Amir Dragons; 111 (19 overs)
Hashmatullah Shahidi 42 (35); Aftab Alam 2/12 (4 overs)		Karim Janat 24 (18); Fazalhaq Farooqi 3/16 (4 overs)

Boost Defenders won by 17 runs
Kabul International Cricket Stadium
Umpires: Ahmed Shah Durrani and Mahmood Kharoti
Player of the match: Hashmatullah Shahidi (Boost Defenders)

- Band-e-Amir Dragons won the toss and elected to field.
- Ahmad Zia, Suliman Safi (Boost Defenders) and Suliman Arabzai (Band-e-Amir Dragons) made their T20 debuts.

Match 18
27 July 2022
14:45
Scorecard

Speenghar Tigers; 197/8 (20 overs)	v	Hindukush Stars; 87 (17.1 overs)
Sharafuddin Ashraf 44 (27); Muslim Musa 3/34 (4 overs)		Hazratullah Zazai 20 (12); Sharafuddin Ashraf 3/7 (3.1 overs)

Speenghar Tigers won by 110 runs
Kabul International Cricket Stadium
Umpires: Ajmal Shamolzi and Bismillah Jan Shinwari
Player of the match: Sharafuddin Ashraf (Speenghar Tigers)

- Speenghar Tigers won the toss and elected to bat.
- Abid Mohammadi and Ismat Alam (Speenghar Tigers) made their T20 debuts.

Match 19
28 July 2022
10:00
Scorecard

Mis Ainak Knights; 152/5 (20 overs)	v	Amo Sharks; 156/5 (19.3 overs)
Asghar Afghan 63 (43); Abidullah Taniwal 2/21 (3 overs)		Asghar Atal 55 (28); Zahir Khan 2/28 (4 overs)

Amo Sharks won by 5 wickets
Kabul International Cricket Stadium
Umpires: Bismillah Jan Shinwari and Muhammad Sabir
Player of the match: Asghar Atal (Amo Sharks)

- Amo Sharks won the toss and elected to field.
- Faridoon Dawoodzai (Amo Sharks) made his T20 debut.

Match 20
28 July 2022
14:45
Scorecard

Pamir Zalmi; 171/3 (20 overs)	v	Kabul Eagles; 172/4 (18.1 overs)
Fazal Zazai 72 (67); Waleed Stanekzai 1/18 (3 overs)		Ibrahim Zadran 91 (55); Rahmat Shah 2/34 (4 overs)

Kabul Eagles won by 6 wickets
Kabul International Cricket Stadium
Umpires: Ahmed Shah Durrani and Izatullah Safi
Player of the match: Ibrahim Zadran (Kabul Eagles)

- Pamir Zalmi won the toss and elected to bat.
- Jumadin Sultani (Kabul Eagles) made his T20 debut.

Match 21
29 July 2022
10:00
Scorecard

Amo Sharks; 135/6 (20 overs)	v	Speenghar Tigers; 138/3 (14.1 overs)
Darwish Rasooli 51 (30); Mohammad Ibrahim 2/25 (4 overs); Yamin Ahmadzai 2/25 (4 overs)		Usman Ghani 72* (43); Yousuf Zazai 1/17 (2 overs)

Speenghar Tigers won by 7 wickets
Kabul International Cricket Stadium
Umpires: Bismillah Jan Shinwari and Muhammad Sabir
Player of the match: Usman Ghani (Speenghar Tigers)

- Speenghar Tigers won the toss and elected to field.
- Sajjad Ibrahim (Speenghar Tigers) made his T20 debut.

Match 22
29 July 2022
15:00
Scorecard

Pamir Zalmi; 159/5 (20 overs)	v	Band-e-Amir Dragons; 95/1 (7.1 overs)
Fazal Zazai 53 (43); Aftab Alam 2/37 (4 overs)		Farmanullah 34* (14)

Band-e-Amir Dragons won by 9 wickets (DLS method)
Kabul International Cricket Stadium
Umpires: Ahmed Shah Pakteen and Farooq Khan
Player of the match: Farmanullah (Band-e-Amir Dragons)

- Pamir Zalmi won the toss and elected to bat.
- Band-e-Amir Dragons were set a revised target of 94 runs in 10 overs due to rain.
- Bakhtullah (Band-e-Amir Dragons), Fahim Bahrami, Hafeez, Ibrahim Masood, Ibrahim Sultanzada and Islam Zazai (Pamir Zalmi) made their T20 debuts.

Match 23
30 July 2022
10:00
Scorecard

Boost Defenders; 157/6 (20 overs)	v	Mis Ainak Knights; 153/6 (20 overs)
Afsar Zazai 67* (42); Sami Totakhil 2/20 (3 overs)		Mohammad Shahzad 77 (52); Ahmad Zia 3/23 (4 overs)

Boost Defenders won by 4 runs
Kabul International Cricket Stadium
Umpires: Ahmed Shah Durrani and Bismillah Jan Shinwari
Player of the match: Afsar Zazai (Boost Defenders)

- Mis Ainak Knights won the toss and elected to field.
- Allah Ghazanfar and Sami Totakhil (Mis Ainak Knights) made their T20 debuts.

Match 24
30 July 2022
14:45
Scorecard

Hindukush Stars; 182/6 (20 overs)	v	Kabul Eagles; 183/1 (13.5 overs)
Zubaid Akbari 83* (52); Haseebullah 2/32 (4 overs); Qais Ahmad 2/32 (4 overs)		Rahmanullah Gurbaz 121* (48); Muslim Musa 1/27 (3 overs)

Kabul Eagles won by 9 wickets
Kabul International Cricket Stadium
Umpires: Ahmed Shah Pakteen and Izatullah Safi
Player of the match: Rahmanullah Gurbaz (Kabul Eagles)

- Hindukush Stars won the toss and elected to bat.
- Ijaz Ahmad Ahmadzai, Mohammad Sabir (Kabul Eagles), Matiullah and Miram Gul Shinwari (Hindukush Stars) made their T20 debuts.

Match 25
31 July 2022
10:00
Scorecard

Amo Sharks; 130/9 (20 overs)	v	Pamir Zalmi; 101/4 (20 overs)
Ihsanullah 54 (36); Usman Ghani 3/13 (4 overs)		Ismail Tarakai 24* (20); Jamshid Khan 2/12 (4 overs)

Amo Sharks won by 29 runs
Kabul International Cricket Stadium
Umpires: Ahmed Shah Pakteen and Izatullah Safi
Player of the match: Ihsanullah (Amo Sharks)

- Pamir Zalmi won the toss and elected to field.
- Ismail Tarakai (Pamir Zalmi), Usman Ghani, Salman Shinwari and Zabiullah Sardarzai (Amo Sharks) made their T20 debuts.

Match 26
31 July 2022
14:45
Scorecard

Speenghar Tigers; 214/4 (20 overs)	v	Band-e-Amir Dragons; 117 (18.3 overs)
Najibullah Zadran 81 (47); Bakhtullah 1/5 (1 over)		Asif Musazai 32 (31); Mohammad Ibrahim 3/10 (3 overs)

Speenghar Tigers won by 97 runs
Kabul International Cricket Stadium
Umpires: Ahmed Shah Durrani and Bismillah Jan Shinwari
Player of the match: Najibullah Zadran (Speenghar Tigers)

- Band-e-Amir Dragons won the toss and elected to field.

Match 27
1 August 2022
10:00
Scorecard

Kabul Eagles; 98 (19.1 overs)	v	Boost Defenders; 104/6 (17.3 overs)
Wahidullah Ali 21 (20); Fazalhaq Farooqi 2/10 (4 overs)		Hassan Eisakhil 56* (52); Haseebullah 2/13 (4 overs)

Boost Defenders won by 4 wickets
Kabul International Cricket Stadium
Umpires: Ahmed Shah Durrani and Bismillah Jan Shinwari
Player of the match: Hassan Eisakhil (Boost Defenders)

- Boost Defenders won the toss and elected to field.
- Latif Mirzakwal, Rahmanullah (Kabul Eagles) and Mohammad Gul Alizai (Boost Defenders) made their T20 debuts.

Match 28
1 August 2022
14:45
Scorecard

Hindukush Stars; 104 (17.3 overs)	v	Mis Ainak Knights; 105/2 (9.3 overs)
Usman Adil 27 (30); Allah Ghazanfar 4/15 (4 overs)		Gulbadin Naib 40* (24); Zubaid Akbari 2/27 (4 overs)

Mis Ainak Knights won by 8 wickets
Kabul International Cricket Stadium
Umpires: Ahmed Shah Pakteen and Izatullah Safi
Player of the match: Allah Ghazanfar (Mis Ainak Knights)

- Hindukush Stars won the toss and elected to bat.
- Javed Tarakai (Mis Ainak Knights) and Ahsan Khan (Hindukush Stars) made their T20 debuts.

== Knockout stage ==
=== Qualifier 1 ===
2 August 2022
10:00
Scorecard

Boost Defenders; 176/3 (20 overs)	v	Speenghar Tigers; 170/5 (20 overs)
Hashmatullah Shahidi 62 (44); Ismat Alam 1/13 (1 over)		Sharafuddin Ashraf 44 (23); Abdul Rahman 2/31 (4 overs)

Boost Defenders won by 6 runs
Kabul International Cricket Stadium
Umpires: Ahmed Shah Durrani and Ahmed Shah Pakteen
Player of the match: Hashmatullah Shahidi (Boost Defenders)

- Speenghar Tigers won the toss and elected to field.

=== Eliminator ===
2 August 2022
14:45
Scorecard

Mis Ainak Knights; 107/9 (14 overs)	v	Kabul Eagles; 72/0 (5 overs)
Riaz Hassan 25 (15); Azmatullah Omarzai 3/18 (3 overs)		Ibrahim Zadran 31* (14)

Kabul Eagles won by 39 runs (DLS method)
Kabul International Cricket Stadium
Umpires: Farooq Khan and Izatullah Safi
Player of the match: Azmatullah Omarzai (Kabul Eagles)

- Kabul Eagles won the toss and elected to field.
- Kabul Eagles were set a revised target of 34 runs in 5 overs due to rain.
- Rahmanullah (Kabul Eagles) made his T20 debut.

=== Qualifier 2 ===
3 August 2022
14:45
Scorecard

Speenghar Tigers; 140/9 (20 overs)	v	Kabul Eagles; 77 (14.2 overs)
Najibullah Zadran 67* (47); Azmatullah Omarzai 3/16 (4 overs)		Shahidullah 37 (33); Fareed Ahmad 3/15 (2.2 overs)

Speenghar Tigers won by 63 runs
Kabul International Cricket Stadium
Umpires: Bismillah Jan Shinwari and Mahmood Kharoti
Player of the match: Najibullah Zadran (Speenghar Tigers)

- Kabul Eagles won the toss and elected to field.

=== Final ===
4 August 2022
11:30
Scorecard

Speenghar Tigers; 188/4 (20 overs)	v	Boost Defenders; 182/6 (20 overs)
Usman Ghani 69 (53); Zia-ur-Rehman 2/45 (4 overs)		Hashmatullah Shahidi 90 (55); Mohammad Ibrahim 2/23 (4 overs)

Speenghar Tigers won by 6 runs
Kabul International Cricket Stadium
Umpires: Farooq Khan and Mahmood Kharoti
Player of the match: Usman Ghani (Speenghar Tigers)

- Speenghar Tigers won the toss and elected to bat.
