= 2019 Ahmad Shah Abdali 4-day Tournament =

Cricket tournament

- Dates: 4 Apr – 2 May 2019 and 27 Nov – 24 Dec 2019
- Administrator(s): Afghanistan Cricket Board (ACB)
- Cricket format: First-class
- Tournament format(s): Round-robin
- Host(s): Afghanistan
- Champions: Speen Ghar Region (1st title)
- Participants: 6
- Matches: 25
- Player of the series: Munir Ahmad
- Most runs: Najeeb Tarakai (828)
- Most wickets: Zohaib Ahmadzai (46)

The 2019 Ahmad Shah Abdali 4-day Tournament was an edition of the Ahmad Shah Abdali 4-day Tournament, a cricket tournament in Afghanistan. It was the third edition of the competition to be played with first-class status. The tournament was split into two phases, with the first half of the competition taking place in April and May 2019, and the second half taking place during November and December 2019.

Six regional teams competed in the tournament, with Band-e-Amir Region being the defending champions. The first round of the tournament started on 4 April 2019 and finished on 2 May 2019. Following the conclusion of the first round of fixtures, Speen Ghar Region were leading the tournament, finishing three points ahead of Amo Region. Kabul Region did not take part in the second round of matches in the tournament. After the completion of the second round of matches, Speen Ghar Region maintained their lead at the top of the table to win the tournament.

== Points table ==
Team	Pld	W	L	D	NR	Pts
Speen Ghar Region	9	4	0	5	0	136
Amo Region	9	3	2	4	0	94
Mis Ainak Region	9	2	3	4	0	83
Boost Region	9	2	3	4	0	74
Kabul Region	5	1	0	3	1	57
Band-e-Amir Region	9	1	5	2	1	56

Champions

== Fixtures ==
=== First round ===
4–7 April 2019
Scorecard

Amo Region	v	Band-e-Amir Region
207 (41.2 overs); Hayatullah 80 (96); Nijat Masood 5/45 (10 overs)		157 (54.2 overs); Noor-ul-Haq 37* (72); Mirwais Ashraf 3/10 (8.2 overs)
359 (83.1 overs); Abdul Malik 98 (120); Mohammad Inamullah 5/70 (22.1 overs)		402 (109.2 overs); Younas Ahmadzai 170 (244); Sharafuddin Ashraf 7/86 (32.2 overs)

Amo Region won by 7 runs
Ghazi Amanullah International Cricket Stadium, Ghazi Amanullah Town
Umpires: Ahmed Shah Durrani and Mahmood Kharoti
Player of the match: Sharafuddin Ashraf (Amo Region)

- Band-e-Amir Region won the toss and elected to field.

4–7 April 2019
Scorecard

Kabul Region	v	Mis Ainak Region
182 (54.5 overs); Jamshid Khan 38 (88); Zahir Khan 3/54 (14 overs)		117 (48.5 overs); Shahidullah 50* (124); Naveen-ul-Haq 8/35 (14 overs)
460 (117.2 overs); Rahmanullah Gurbaz 153 (209); Zia-ur-Rehman 4/82 (38 overs)		145 (33.2 overs); Fazal Niazai 39 (38); Fazalhaq Farooqi 6/26 (7.2 overs)

Kabul Region won by 380 runs
Ayoubi Cricket Stadium, Kabul
Umpires: Bismillah Jan Shinwari and Ajmal Shamolzi
Player of the match: Naveen-ul-Haq (Kabul Region)

- Kabul Region won the toss and elected to bat.
- Mohammad Sabir, Ijaz Ahmad, Shafiqullah Ghafari and Ishaq Zazai (Kabul Region) all made their first-class debuts.

4–7 April 2019
Scorecard

Speen Ghar Region	v	Boost Region
536 (143 overs); Bahir Shah 156* (252); Abdul Baqi 3/95 (25 overs)		389 (120.4 overs); Waqarullah Ishaq 156* (310); Wafadar Momand 4/57 (27.4 overs)
261/4 (84 overs); Shabir Noori 93 (224); Yamin Ahmadzai 2/44 (15 overs)

Match drawn
Kunar Cricket Ground, Kunar
Umpires: Farooq Khan and Izatullah Safi
Player of the match: Bahir Shah (Speen Ghar Region)

- Boost Region won the toss and elected to field.

10–13 April 2019
Scorecard

Band-e-Amir Region	v	Kabul Region

Match abandoned
Kabul International Cricket Stadium, Kabul
Umpires: Bismillah Jan Shinwari and Ajmal Shamolzi

- No toss.
- No play was possible due to rain.

10–13 April 2019
Scorecard

Mis Ainak Region	v	Boost Region
508 (121.3 overs); Ihsanullah 248 (239); Karim Sadiq 3/83 (18 overs)		239 (83.1 overs); Bahar Shinwari 62 (100); Zahir Khan 6/52 (23.1 overs)
		167 (46.2 overs) (f/o); Nasir Jamal 62 (110); Zia-ur-Rehman 3/12 (12 overs)

Mis Ainak Region won by an innings and 102 runs
Kunar Cricket Ground, Kunar
Umpires: Farooq Khan and Izatullah Safi
Player of the match: Ihsanullah (Mis Ainak Region)

- Mis Ainak Region won the toss and elected to bat.

10–13 April 2019
Scorecard

Amo Region	v	Speen Ghar Region
302 (65.5 overs); Javed Ahmadi 197 (201); Azmatullah Omarzai 4/73 (10 overs)		336 (105.5 overs); Najeeb Tarakai 103 (157); Zohaib Ahmadzai 4/99 (26 overs)
391 (99 overs); Abdul Malik 179 (305); Azmatullah Omarzai 4/82 (20 overs)		199/3 (51 overs); Najeeb Tarakai 72 (75); Abdul Wasi 2/49 (12 overs)

Match drawn
Ghazi Amanullah International Cricket Stadium, Ghazi Amanullah Town
Umpires: Mahmood Kharoti and Muhammad Sabir
Player of the match: Azmatullah Omarzai (Speen Ghar Region)

- Amo Region won the toss and elected to bat.

16–19 April 2019
Scorecard

Band-e-Amir Region	v	Boost Region
114 (37.2 overs); Waqar Salamkheil 29 (48); Yamin Ahmadzai 5/37 (16 overs)		330/8d (78 overs); Nasibullah Sherdali 109 (215); Nijat Masood 3/84 (20 overs)
208 (56.2 overs); Mohammad Sardar 62 (80); Dastagir Khan 3/18 (9.2 overs)

Boost Region won by an innings and 8 runs
Ghazi Amanullah International Cricket Stadium, Ghazi Amanullah Town
Umpires: Bismillah Jan Shinwari and Izatullah Safi
Player of the match: Yamin Ahmadzai (Boost Region)

- Boost Region won the toss and elected to field.
- No play was possible on day 2 due to rain.

16–19 April 2019
Scorecard

Kabul Region	v	Amo Region
217 (72.2 overs); Farhan Zakhil 60 (136); Zohaib Ahmadzai 7/51 (18.2 overs)		229/5 (37 overs); Hayatullah 102* (64); Arif Khan 2/55 (11 overs)

Match drawn
Ayoubi Cricket Stadium, Kabul
Umpires: Ahmed Shah Pakteen and Ahmed Shah Durrani
Player of the match: Zohaib Ahmadzai (Amo Region)

- Amo Region won the toss and elected to field.
- No play was possible on days 1 and 2 due to rain.
- Islam Zazai and Abdul Rahman (Kabul Region) both made their first-class debuts.

16–19 April 2019
Scorecard

Mis Ainak Region	v	Speen Ghar Region
425 (110.2 overs); Shahidullah 148 (210); Zahir Shehzad 6/149 (34.2 overs)		299/5 (52.3 overs); Najeeb Tarakai 200 (135); Zia-ur-Rehman 2/82 (16.3 overs)

Match drawn
Kunar Cricket Ground, Kunar
Umpires: Mahmood Kharoti and Abdullah Rahimi
Player of the match: Najeeb Tarakai (Speen Ghar Region)

- Speen Ghar Region won the toss and elected to field.
- No play was possible on days 1 and 2 due to rain.

22–25 April 2019
Scorecard

Mis Ainak Region	v	Band-e-Amir Region
178 (44.3 overs); Shahidullah 71 (71); Waqar Salamkheil 3/25 (12 overs)		246 (68.3 overs); Zia-ul-Haq 81 (133); Zia-ur-Rehman 6/57 (24.3 overs)
361 (82.4 overs); Ihsanullah 159 (180); Nasratullah 3/58 (17 overs)		263/9 (68 overs); Nisar Wahdat 89* (126); Zahir Khan 6/75 (20 overs)

Match drawn
Ayoubi Cricket Stadium, Kabul
Umpires: Farooq Khan and Rab Nawaz Ghaznavi
Player of the match: Nisar Wahdat (Band-e-Amir Region)

- Mis Ainak Region won the toss and elected to bat.
- No play was possible on day 3 due to rain.

22–25 April 2019
Scorecard

Boost Region	v	Amo Region
142 (48.2 overs); Nasir Jamal 53 (98); Zohaib Ahmadzai 3/21 (13 overs)		334 (79.5 overs); Hayatullah 94* (90); Karim Sadiq 6/55 (18.5 overs)
165 (81.3 overs); Qudratullah 67 (243); Zohaib Ahmadzai 6/41 (21.3 overs)

Amo Region won by an innings and 27 runs
Ghazi Amanullah International Cricket Stadium, Ghazi Amanullah Town
Umpires: Izatullah Safi and Muhammad Sabir
Player of the match: Zohaib Ahmadzai (Amo Region)

- Amo Region won the toss and elected to field.

22–25 April 2019
Scorecard

Speen Ghar Region	v	Kabul Region
253 (60 overs); Shawkat Zaman 86 (88); Naveen-ul-Haq 3/24 (9 overs)		306 (76.3 overs); Farhan Zakhil 76 (90); Tahir Khan 4/80 (19.3 overs)
294/4 (57 overs); Najeeb Tarakai 140 (120); Shafiqullah Ghafari 2/81 (16 overs)

Match drawn
Kunar Cricket Ground, Kunar
Umpires: Ahmed Shah Durrani and Ajmal Shamolzi
Player of the match: (Speen Ghar Region)

- Speen Ghar Region won the toss and elected to bat.
- No play was possible on day 3 due to rain.
- Abid Mohammadi and Nawid Mohammad Kabir (Kabul Region) both made their first-class debuts.

29 April–2 May 2019
Scorecard

Kabul Region	v	Boost Region
305 (82.2 overs); Farhan Zakhil 104 (139); Yamin Ahmadzai 3/51 (14.2 overs)		324 (104 overs); Nasir Jamal 172 (288); Abidullah Taniwal 5/73 (27 overs)
371/9d (119.4 overs); Farhan Zakhil 108 (241); Yamin Ahmadzai 3/59 (22.4 overs)		98/4 (35 overs); Munir Ahmad 26 (29); Noor Ahmad 2/47 (13 overs)

Match drawn
Ayoubi Cricket Stadium, Kabul
Umpires: Ahmed Shah Pakteen and Abdullah Rahimi
Player of the match: Farhan Zakhil (Kabul Region)

- Kabul Region won the toss and elected to bat.
- Bashir Ahmad (Boost Region), Hasan Safai, Abdullah Tarakhail, Abidullah Taniwal and Noor Ahmad (Kabul Region) all made their first-class debuts.

29 April–2 May 2019
Scorecard

Band-e-Amir Region	v	Speen Ghar Region
179 (48.3 overs); Imran Janat 71 (79); Qais Ahmad 7/43 (18 overs)		445 (102.3 overs); Bahir Shah 145 (253); Waqar Salamkheil 2/52 (11 overs)
321 (81.4 overs); Usman Ghani 116 (171); Qais Ahmad 6/86 (30.4 overs)		59/1 (9.4 overs); Bahir Shah 22* (20); Waqar Salamkheil 1/16 (4 overs)

Speen Ghar Region won by 9 wickets
Ghazi Amanullah International Cricket Stadium, Ghazi Amanullah Town
Umpires: Ahmed Shah Durrani and Mehmood Kharotai
Player of the match: Qais Ahmad (Speen Ghar Region)

- Speen Ghar Region won the toss and elected to field.

29 April–2 May 2019
Scorecard

Mis Ainak Region	v	Amo Region
313 (62.3 overs); Shahidullah 122 (115); Zohaib Ahmadzai 5/57 (16.3 overs)		185 (44 overs); Mohammad Wasim Mandozai 47 (47); Fazal Niazai 4/67 (14 overs)
408 (99.1 overs); Shahidullah 189 (226); Zohaib Ahmadzai 4/123 (28.1 overs)		261 (60.5 overs); Zahid Zakhail 89 (138); Zia-ur-Rehman 6/52 (18.5 overs)

Mis Ainak Region won by 275 runs
Kunar Cricket Ground, Kunar
Umpires: Ajmal Shamolzi and Muhammad Sabir
Player of the match: Shahidullah (Mis Ainak Region)

- Amo Region won the toss and elected to field.
- Abdul Basit (Amo Region) made his first-class debut.

=== Second round ===
27–30 November 2019
Scorecard

Speen Ghar Region	v	Amo Region
322 (88.4 overs); Najeeb Tarakai 92 (132); Salim 3/71 (19 overs)		282 (93.3 overs); Juma Gul 127 (218); Fareed Ahmad 4/57 (21 overs)
291 (83.4 overs); Darwish Rasooli 123 (181); Salim 5/52 (16 overs)		259/6 (86 overs); Abdul Malik 114 (193); Fareed Ahmad 2/65 (19 overs)

Match drawn
Ghazi Amanullah International Cricket Stadium, Ghazi Amanullah Town
Umpires: Tahsil Shinwari and Irshad Omari
Player of the match: Fareed Ahmad (Speen Ghar Region)

- Amo Region won the toss and elected to field.

27–30 November 2019
Scorecard

Mis Ainak Region	v	Boost Region
306 (74.5 overs); Ihsanullah Ihsan 59 (54); Waqarullah Ishaq 3/41 (9.5 overs)		260 (103.1 overs); Mohammad Ibrahim 65 (192); Yousuf Zazai 3/40 (22 overs)
336 (89.2 overs); Fazal Niazai 102 (175); Abdul Baqi 4/87 (18.2 overs)		210/9 (91 overs); Nasibullah Sherdali 61 (97); Shahidullah 3/64 (20 overs)

Match drawn
Khost Cricket Stadium, Khost
Umpires: Farooq Khan and Khan Mohammad
Player of the match: Fazal Niazai (Mis Ainak Region)

- Boost Region won the toss and elected to field.
- Toryal Hamkar (Boost Region) made his first-class debut.

3–6 December 2019
Scorecard

Band-e-Amir Region	v	Speen Ghar Region
145 (54.3 overs); Zia-ul-Haq 49 (97); Azmatullah Omarzai 3/18 (17 overs)		302 (95 overs); Perwez Malikzai 89 (175); Abdullah Adil 5/75 (24 overs)
353 (117 overs); Younas Ahmadzai 104 (171); Tariq Stanikzai 3/68 (19 overs)		197/6 (49.1 overs); Bahir Shah 79* (99); Abdullah Adil 3/55 (16 overs)

Speen Ghar Region won by 4 wickets
Ghazi Amanullah International Cricket Stadium, Ghazi Amanullah Town
Umpires: Muhammad Sabir and Mujahid Shorash
Player of the match: Perwez Malikzai (Speen Ghar Region)

- Speen Ghar Region won the toss and elected to field.

3–6 December 2019
Scorecard

Amo Region	v	Mis Ainak Region
556/6d (146.4 overs); Zahid Zakhail 215* (316); Ihsanullah Ihsan 2/119 (36 overs)		288 (91.5 overs); Zia-ul-haq 126 (205); Mohammad Zahir 3/66 (17.5 overs)
		175 (52.5 overs) (f/o); Rahmatullah Sahaq 48 (46); Zohaib Ahmadzai 9/37 (19.5 overs)

Amo Region won by an innings and 93 runs
Khost Cricket Stadium, Khost
Umpires: Ihsanullah Danish and Farooq Khan
Player of the match: Zohaib Ahmadzai (Amo Region)

- Amo Region won the toss and elected to bat.

9–12 December 2019
Scorecard

Mis Ainak Region	v	Band-e-Amir Region
486 (100.1 overs); Noor Ali Zadran 150 (181); Shamsurrahman 4/129 (22.1 overs)		209 (62.4 overs); Hashmatullah Shahidi 110 (177); Zia-ur-Rehman 6/46 (19.4 overs)
244/6d (70 overs); Shahidullah 56 (72); Nijat Masood 2/39 (12 overs)		245/7 (68.3 overs); Zia-ul-Haq 94 (155); Yousuf Zazai 6/85 (18.3 overs)

Match drawn
Ghazi Amanullah International Cricket Stadium, Ghazi Amanullah Town
Umpires: Mohammad Shah Fazalyar and Muhammad Sabir
Player of the match: Yousuf Zazai (Mis Ainak Region)

- Mis Ainak Region won the toss and elected to bat.

9–12 December 2019
Scorecard

Amo Region	v	Boost Region
262 (80.5 overs); Zahid Zakhail 56 (91); Dastagir Khan 4/57 (19.5 overs)		337 (99.4 overs); Munir Ahmad 209 (282); Abdul Wasi 5/74 (22 overs)
415/8d (109.1 overs); Abdul Wasi 87 (91); Yamin Ahmadzai 4/116 (28 overs)		98/4 (37 overs); Nasir Jamal 51 (102); Salim 2/8 (6 overs)

Match drawn
Khost Cricket Stadium, Khost
Umpires: Mehmood Kharotai and Irshad Omari
Player of the match: Munir Ahmad (Boost Region)

- Amo Region won the toss and elected to bat.

15–18 December 2019
Scorecard

Mis Ainak Region	v	Speen Ghar Region
244 (83.1 overs); Fazal Niazai 132 (206); Fareed Ahmad 3/73 (22 overs)		515 (128 overs); Darwish Rasooli 124 (218); Yousuf Zazai 5/120 (27.4 overs)
168 (44.4 overs); Rashid Zadran 42 (83); Arshad Khan 3/23 (3.4 overs)

Speen Ghar Region won by an innings and 103 runs
Ghazi Amanullah International Cricket Stadium, Ghazi Amanullah Town
Umpires: Mehmood Kharotai and Ahmed Shah Durrani
Player of the match: Fareed Ahmad (Speen Ghar Region)

- Speen Ghar Region won the toss and elected to field.
- Khalil Gurbaz and Ishaq Saqi (Mis Ainak Region) both made their first-class debuts.

15–18 December 2019
Scorecard

Band-e-Amir Region	v	Boost Region
314 (97.2 overs); Amanullah Rafiqi 101 (157); Dastagir Khan 4/49 (18 overs)		157 (43.5 overs); Abdullah Tarakhail 54 (56); Farmanullah 4/40 (13 overs)
144 (49.1 overs); Zia-ul-Haq 27 (34); Rokhan Barakzai 5/44 (19 overs)		305/6 (78.5 overs); Munir Ahmad 162* (210); Sayed Nasratullah 5/64 (26 overs)

Boost Region won by 4 wickets
Khost Cricket Stadium, Khost
Umpires: Bismillah Jan Shinwari and Rab Nawaz Ghaznavi
Player of the match: Munir Ahmad (Boost Region)

- Band-e-Amir Region won the toss and elected to bat.

21–24 December 2019
Scorecard

Amo Region	v	Band-e-Amir Region
216 (67.3 overs); Abdul Wasi 81* (80); Parvez Amin 5/80 (18.4 overs)		276 (80.2 overs); Imran Janat 72 (120); Abdul Wasi 4/97 (26.2 overs)
263 (88.2 overs); Abdul Wasi 56* (75); Amir Hamza 6/70 (33.2 overs)		207/2 (45.2 overs); Amanullah Rafiqi 111* (139); Ibrahim 1/34 (7 overs)

Band-e-Amir Region won by 8 wickets
Ghazi Amanullah International Cricket Stadium, Ghazi Amanullah Town
Umpires: Mehmood Kharotai and Bahader Niazai
Player of the match: Amanullah Rafiqi (Band-e-Amir Region)

- Amo Region won the toss and elected to bat.
- Rokhan Zarmalwal (Band-e-Amir Region) made his first-class debut.

21–24 December 2019
Scorecard

Boost Region	v	Speen Ghar Region
61 (17.5 overs); Islam Zazai 16 (24); Fareed Ahmad 6/27 (9 overs)		286 (76 overs); Waheedullah Shafaq 120 (131); Rokhan Barakzai 4/68 (20 overs)
392 (82.2 overs); Munir Ahmad 177 (197); Najeeb Tarakai 4/59 (16.2 overs)		168/4 (42.4 overs); Zubaid Akbari 73* (125); Nawid Mohammad Kabir 2/27 (10 overs)

Speen Ghar Region won by 6 wickets
Khost Cricket Stadium, Khost
Umpires: Farooq Khan and Rab Nawaz Ghaznavi
Player of the match: Fareed Ahmad (Speen Ghar Region)

- Boost Region won the toss and elected to bat.
