= 2020 Shpageeza Cricket League =

Cricket tournament

- Dates: 6 – 18 September 2020
- Administrator: Afghanistan Cricket Board (ACB)
- Cricket format: Twenty20
- Tournament format(s): Round-robin and playoffs
- Host: Afghanistan
- Champions: Kabul Eagles (2nd title)
- Runners-up: Mis Ainak Knights
- Participants: 6
- Matches: 19
- Player of the series: Azmatullah Omarzai; Karim Janat
- Most runs: Usman Ghani (355)
- Most wickets: Waqar Salamkheil (13); Nangialai Kharoti (13)

The 2020 Shpageeza Cricket League was the seventh edition of the Shpageeza Cricket League, a professional Twenty20 cricket (T20) league established by the Afghanistan Cricket Board (ACB) in 2013, and the third edition to have official T20 status. Following a request to the Ministry of Public Health due to the COVID-19 pandemic, the tournament was given approval in July 2020 to take place. The ACB also confirmed that it was their priority to run a successful tournament.

The tournament was originally scheduled to take place from 13 to 25 September 2020, with the matches being played at the Kabul International Cricket Stadium. However, the tournament was moved forward by one week, to avoid clashing with the 2020 Indian Premier League (IPL), which itself had been delayed due to the COVID-19 pandemic. Six teams took part in the tournament, and the Mis Ainak Knights were the defending champions.

On 20 August 2020, a players' draft took place ahead of the tournament. The ACB also stated that all Afghan players taking part in the 2020 Caribbean Premier League (CPL) should return to Afghanistan before the CPL is due to conclude, so they can be available to play in the Shpageeza Cricket League. However, after talks with the President of Cricket West Indies, it was decided that these players could finish the CPL before returning, while the players with IPL contracts would miss the tournament completely.

The opening match of the tournament saw the Mis Ainak Knights beat the Band-e-Amir Dragons by one run, with the Knights managing to defend 13 runs from the final over of the game.

The Kabul Eagles, Mis Ainak Knights, Band-e-Amir Dragons and Boost Defenders finished in the top four places in the group stage to progress to the knockout phase of the tournament. In the first qualifier, the Kabul Eagles beat the Mis Ainak Knights by four wickets. Therefore, the Eagles progressed directly to the final, with the Knights moving to the second qualifier match. In the eliminator match, the Band-e-Amir Dragons beat the Boost Defenders by 76 runs to join the Knights in the second qualifier match. The second qualifier saw the Mis Ainak Knights beat the Band-e-Amir Dragons by five wickets, to join the Kabul Eagles in the final.

In the final, the Kabul Eagles beat Mis Ainak Knights by nine runs to win the tournament. The final took place at the 6,000-capacity Kabul International Cricket Stadium. A capacity crowd of 6,000 attended the final.

== Points table ==
Team	Pld	W	L	T	NRR	Pts
Kabul Eagles	5	4	1	0	+0.350	8
Mis Ainak Knights	5	3	2	0	+1.773	6
Band-e-Amir Dragons	5	3	2	0	+1.005	6
Boost Defenders	5	3	2	0	+0.918	6
Speen Ghar Tigers	5	2	3	0	–0.608	4
Amo Sharks	5	0	5	0	–3.481	0

== Fixtures ==
6 September 2020
13:30
Scorecard

Mis Ainak Knights; 179/7 (20 overs)	v	Band-e-Amir Dragons; 178/5 (20 overs)
Hashmatullah Shahidi 65 (44); Sharafuddin Ashraf 2/36 (4 overs)		Usman Ghani 79 (63); Noor Ahmad 2/30 (4 overs)

Mis Ainak Knights won by 1 run
Kabul International Cricket Stadium
Umpires: Bismillah Jan Shinwari and Ahmed Shah Pakteen
Player of the match: Hashmatullah Shahidi (Mis Ainak Knights)

- Band-e-Amir Dragons won the toss and elected to field.

7 September 2020
09:30
Scorecard

Speen Ghar Tigers; 150/6 (20 overs)	v	Amo Sharks; 101/9 (20 overs)
Zubaid Akbari 51 (37); Abdul Wasi 2/30 (4 overs)		Abdul Wasi 30* (28); Karim Sadiq 5/15 (4 overs)

Speen Ghar Tigers won by 49 runs
Kabul International Cricket Stadium
Umpires: Mehmood Kharotai and Ahmed Shah Durrani
Player of the match: Karim Sadiq (Speen Ghar Tigers)

- Speen Ghar Tigers won the toss and elected to bat.
- Farhan Zakhil, Asadullah Matani (Amo Sharks), Zubaid Akbari and Zahid Khan (Speen Ghar Tigers) all made their T20 debuts.

7 September 2020
14:00
Scorecard

Boost Defenders; 172/3 (20 overs)	v	Kabul Eagles; 115 (19.1 overs)
Imran Janat 43 (27); Farmanullah 1/19 (2 overs)		Sediqullah Atal 32 (29); Sayed Shirzad 3/7 (3.1 overs)

Boost Defenders won by 57 runs
Kabul International Cricket Stadium
Umpires: Bismillah Jan Shinwari and Izatullah Safi
Player of the match: Sayed Shirzad (Boost Defenders)

- Boost Defenders won the toss and elected to bat.
- Sediqullah Atal, Nangialai Kharoti (Kabul Eagles) and Mohammad Saleem (Boost Defenders) all made their T20 debuts.

8 September 2020
09:30
Scorecard

Mis Ainak Knights; 163/6 (20 overs)	v	Kabul Eagles; 164/6 (19 overs)
Shahidullah 58* (51); Zia-ur-Rehman 3/30 (4 overs)		Noor Ali Zadran 61 (42); Abdullah Mazari 2/39 (4 overs)

Kabul Eagles won by 4 wickets
Kabul International Cricket Stadium
Umpires: Izatullah Safi and Ajmal Shamolzi
Player of the match: Noor Ali Zadran (Kabul Eagles)

- Kabul Eagles won the toss and elected to field.
- Wasim Zazai and Riaz Hassan (Kabul Eagles) both made their T20 debuts.
- Noor Ali Zadran (Kabul Eagles) was dismissed by mankading.

8 September 2020
14:00
Scorecard

Boost Defenders; 133/9 (20 overs)	v	Band-e-Amir Dragons; 134/1 (15 overs)
Imran Janat 33 (28); Sharafuddin Ashraf 4/13 (4 overs)		Usman Ghani 62* (51); Karim Janat 1/19 (2 overs)

Band-e-Amir Dragons won by 9 wickets
Kabul International Cricket Stadium
Umpires: Ahmed Shah Pakteen and Farooq Khan
Player of the match: Sharafuddin Ashraf (Band-e-Amir Dragons)

- Boost Defenders won the toss and elected to bat.

9 September 2020
09:30
Scorecard

Amo Sharks; 142/5 (20 overs)	v	Band-e-Amir Dragons; 144/3 (17.3 overs)
Darwish Rasooli 52* (37); Sharafuddin Ashraf 2/29 (4 overs)		Usman Ghani 57 (40); Abdul Wasi 3/17 (4 overs)

Band-e-Amir Dragons won by 7 wickets
Kabul International Cricket Stadium
Umpires: Bismillah Jan Shinwari and Muhammad Sabir
Player of the match: Usman Ghani (Band-e-Amir Dragons)

- Band-e-Amir Dragons won the toss and elected to field.

9 September 2020
14:00
Scorecard

Mis Ainak Knights; 221/4 (20 overs)	v	Speen Ghar Tigers; 163 (18.3 overs)
Bahar Shinwari 65 (40); Abdullah Adil 2/36 (4 overs)		Karim Sadiq 33 (20); Abdullah Mazari 4/26 (4 overs)

Mis Ainak Knights won by 58 runs
Kabul International Cricket Stadium
Umpires: Mehmood Kharotai and Ajmal Shamolzi
Player of the match: Bahar Shinwari (Mis Ainak Knights)

- Mis Ainak Knights won the toss and elected to bat.
- Pakhtoon Sarfaraz and Mohammadullah Hamkar (Mis Ainak Knights) both made their T20 debuts.

10 September 2020
09:30
Scorecard

Speen Ghar Tigers; 175/3 (20 overs)	v	Boost Defenders; 170/8 (20 overs)
Tamim Surkhorodi 79 (48); Amir Hamza 2/22 (4 overs)		Karim Janat 51 (30); Zubaid Akbari 2/18 (2 overs)

Speen Ghar Tigers won by 5 runs
Kabul International Cricket Stadium
Umpires: Ahmed Shah Durrani and Farooq Khan
Player of the match: Tamim Surkhorodi (Speen Ghar Tigers)

- Boost Defenders won the toss and elected to field.
- Wahidullah Ali (Boost Defenders) and Majeed Alam (Speen Ghar Tigers) both made their T20 debuts.

10 September 2020
14:00
Scorecard

Kabul Eagles; 223/5 (20 overs)	v	Amo Sharks; 162/7 (20 overs)
Rahmanullah Gurbaz 99 (50); Abdul Wasi 1/21 (4 overs)		Darwish Rasooli 73 (47); Nangialai Kharoti 3/29 (3 overs)

Kabul Eagles won by 61 runs
Kabul International Cricket Stadium
Umpires: Ahmed Shah Pakteen and Muhammad Sabir
Player of the match: Rahmanullah Gurbaz (Kabul Eagles)

- Kabul Eagles won the toss and elected to bat.
- Rahmanullah (Kabul Eagles) and Amanullah Rafiqi (Amo Sharks) both made their T20 debuts.

11 September 2020
09:30
Scorecard

Speen Ghar Tigers; 139/5 (20 overs)	v	Band-e-Amir Dragons; 145/3 (16.1 overs)
Perwez Malikzai 41 (25); Hamid Hassan 1/18 (4 overs)		Hazratullah Zazai 42 (29); Aftab Alam 1/9 (1.1 overs)

Band-e-Amir Dragons won by 7 wickets
Kabul International Cricket Stadium
Umpires: Izatullah Safi and Ajmal Shamolzi
Player of the match: Asghar Afghan (Band-e-Amir Dragons)

- Speen Ghar Tigers won the toss and elected to bat.
- Jalat Khan (Speen Ghar Tigers) made his T20 debut.

11 September 2020
14:00
Scorecard

Mis Ainak Knights; 188/2 (20 overs)	v	Boost Defenders; 192/6 (20 overs)
Mohammad Shahzad 106* (64); Karim Janat 2/34 (4 overs)		Gulbadin Naib 54* (27); Noor Ahmad 2/21 (4 overs)

Boost Defenders won by 4 wickets
Kabul International Cricket Stadium
Umpires: Bismillah Jan Shinwari and Mehmood Kharotai
Player of the match: Gulbadin Naib (Boost Defenders)

- Mis Ainak Knights won the toss and elected to bat.

12 September 2020
09:30
Scorecard

Band-e-Amir Dragons; 146/5 (20 overs)	v	Kabul Eagles; 149/8 (20 overs)
Ibrahim Zadran 48 (41); Ziaur Rahman 2/21 (4 overs)		Samiullah Shinwari 58* (38); Farhad Momand 3/21 (4 overs)

Kabul Eagles won by 2 wickets
Kabul International Cricket Stadium
Umpires: Ahmed Shah Pakteen and Farooq Khan
Player of the match: Samiullah Shinwari (Kabul Eagles)

- Kabul Eagles won the toss and elected to field.
- Bilal Sami and Farhad Momand (Band-e-Amir Dragons) both made their T20 debuts.

12 September 2020
14:00
Scorecard

Mis Ainak Knights; 193/5 (20 overs)	v	Amo Sharks; 62 (12 overs)
Hashmatullah Shahidi 82* (52); Fareed Ahmad 2/13 (3 overs)		Amanullah Rafiqi 21 (19); Dawlat Zadran 5/9 (3 overs)

Mis Ainak Knights won by 131 runs
Kabul International Cricket Stadium
Umpires: Mehmood Kharotai and Ahmed Shah Durrani
Player of the match: Hashmatullah Shahidi (Mis Ainak Knights)

- Amo Sharks won the toss and elected to field.
- Janat Gul, Yahya Khan, Shir Shirzai (Amo Sharks) and Abdul Baqi (Mis Ainak Knights) all made their T20 debuts.

13 September 2020
09:30
Scorecard

Speen Ghar Tigers; 142/8 (20 overs)	v	Kabul Eagles; 143/4 (17.5 overs)
Bahir Shah 37 (30); Azmatullah Omarzai 3/20 (4 overs)		Rahmanullah Gurbaz 40 (19); Zubaid Akbari 2/15 (3 overs)

Kabul Eagles won by 6 wickets
Kabul International Cricket Stadium
Umpires: Izatullah Safi and Muhammad Sabir
Player of the match: Azmatullah Omarzai (Kabul Eagles)

- Kabul Eagles won the toss and elected to field.
- Abdul Latif Ayoubi (Kabul Eagles) made his T20 debut.
- Abdul Latif Ayoubi was also the team owner of the Kabul Eagles.

13 September 2020
14:00
Scorecard

Amo Sharks; 122/5 (20 overs)	v	Boost Defenders; 124/0 (11.3 overs)
Darwish Rasooli 51* (22); Amir Hamza 2/7 (4 overs)		Karim Janat 64* (38)

Boost Defenders won by 10 wickets
Kabul International Cricket Stadium
Umpires: Mehmood Kharotai and Ahmed Shah Durrani
Player of the match: Karim Janat (Boost Defenders)

- Boost Defenders won the toss and elected to field.
- Zahid Zakhail (Amo Sharks) made his T20 debut.

== Knockout-stage ==
Qualifier 1
14 September 2020
09:30
Scorecard

Mis Ainak Knights; 208/3 (20 overs)	v	Kabul Eagles; 209/6 (19.1 overs)
Hashmatullah Shahidi 97* (52); Nangialai Kharoti 2/42 (4 overs)		Noor Ali Zadran 85 (52); Shapoor Zadran 2/36 (4 overs)

Kabul Eagles won by 4 wickets
Kabul International Cricket Stadium
Umpires: Ahmed Shah Durrani and Ajmal Shamolzi
Player of the match: Noor Ali Zadran (Kabul Eagles)

- Kabul Eagles won the toss and elected to field.
- Sharifullah Ahmadzai (Kabul Eagles) made his T20 debut.

Eliminator
14 September 2020
14:00
Scorecard

Band-e-Amir Dragons; 232/2 (20 overs)	v	Boost Defenders; 156 (19.2 overs)
Asghar Afghan 95* (39); Amir Hamza 1/21 (4 overs)		Karim Janat 60 (29); Mirwais Ashraf 4/14 (4 overs)

Band-e-Amir Dragons won by 76 runs
Kabul International Cricket Stadium
Umpires: Mehmood Kharotai and Bismillah Jan Shinwari
Player of the match: Asghar Afghan (Band-e-Amir Dragons)

- Boost Defenders won the toss and elected to field.

Qualifier 2
15 September 2020
13:00
Scorecard

Band-e-Amir Dragons; 178/8 (20 overs)	v	Mis Ainak Knights; 182/5 (18.4 overs)
Usman Ghani 64 (49); Dawlat Zadran 2/38 (4 overs)		Bahar Shinwari 47 (27); Sharafuddin Ashraf 1/24 (3 overs)

Mis Ainak Knights won by 5 wickets
Kabul International Cricket Stadium
Umpires: Farooq Khan and Izatullah Safi
Player of the match: Shahidullah (Mis Ainak Knights)

- Band-e-Amir Dragons won the toss and elected to bat.

Final
16 September 2020
13:00
Scorecard

Kabul Eagles; 139 (19.1 overs)	v	Mis Ainak Knights; 130 (19.4 overs)
Younas Ahmadzai 36 (28); Dawlat Zadran 3/12 (3.3 overs)		Ghamai Zadran 40 (36); Nijat Masood 2/21 (4 overs)

Kabul Eagles won by 9 runs
Kabul International Cricket Stadium
Umpires: Bismillah Jan Shinwari and Ahmed Shah Pakteen
Player of the match: Nangialai Kharoti (Kabul Eagles)

- Mis Ainak Knights won the toss and elected to field.
- Haseebullah (Kabul Eagles) made his T20 debut.
