= Ayoubi Cricket Stadium =

Cricket ground in Kabul, Afghanistan

Ayobi Cricket Stadium
- Interactive map of Ayobi Cricket Stadium

Ground information
- Location: Kabul, Afghanistan
- Country: Afghanistan
- Coordinates: 34.474583°N 69.327555°E
- Establishment: 2018

Team information
Kabul Region	(2018/19)
- As of 28 April 2022; Source: Ground profile

Ayobi Cricket Stadium is a cricket ground in Kabul, Afghanistan.

== History ==
The stadium hosted four first-class cricket matches during the 2019 Ahmad Shah Abdali 4-day Tournament, including three matches for the Kabul Region cricket team and a match between Band-e-Amir Region and Mis Ainak Region. The ground is named after the owner of the Kabul Eagles Abdul Latif Ayoubi.

== Records ==
=== First-class ===
- Highest team total: 460 all out by Kabul Region v Mis Ainak Region, 2018–19
- Lowest team total: 117 all out by Mis Ainak Region v Kabul Region, as above
- Highest individual innings: 172 by Nasir Jamal for Boost Region v Kabul Region, 2018–19
- Best bowling in an innings: 8-35 by Naveen-ul-Haq for Kabul Region v Mis Ainak Region, 2018–19
- Best bowling in a match: 8-61 by Naveen-ul-Haq, as above

== See also ==
- List of cricket grounds in Afghanistan
