= 2020 Ghazi Amanullah Khan Regional One Day Tournament =

Cricket tournament

- Dates: 10 – 22 October 2020
- Administrator: Afghanistan Cricket Board
- Cricket format: List A
- Tournament format(s): Round-robin, knockout
- Champions: Mis Ainak Region (2nd title)
- Participants: 5
- Matches: 12
- Player of the series: Javed Ahmadi
- Most runs: Rahmat Shah (257)
- Most wickets: Zahir Khan (13)

The 2020 Ghazi Amanullah Khan Regional One Day Tournament was a List A cricket competition that took place in Kandahar, Afghanistan between 10 and 22 October 2020. It was the fourth edition of the competition to be played with List A status, following the announcements by the International Cricket Council (ICC) in February and May 2017. Mis Ainak Region were the defending champions.

Following the conclusion of the group stage, Amo Region had progressed directly to the final, with Mis Ainak Region and Band-e-Amir Region moving to the Eliminator knock-out match. In the Eliminator match, Mis Ainak Region beat Band-e-Amir Region by seven wickets to join Amo Region in the final. In the final, Mis Ainak Region beat Amo Region by seven wickets to win their second title.

== Fixtures ==
=== Points table ===
Pos	Team	Pld	W	L	NR	Pts	NRR
1	Amo Region	4	4	0	0	8	1.179
2	Mis Ainak Region	4	3	1	0	6	−0.168
3	Band-e-Amir Region	4	2	2	0	4	0.599
4	Speen Ghar Region	4	1	3	0	2	−0.041
5	Boost Region	4	0	4	0	0	−1.433

Source: Cricinfo

Advanced to the Final Advanced to the Eliminator

=== Group stage ===
10 October 2020
Scorecard

Boost Region; 89 (35 overs)	v	Band-e-Amir Region; 90/4 (18 overs)
Munir Ahmad 34* (85); Amir Hamza 3/10 (10 overs)		Darwish Rasooli 19 (22); Yamin Ahmadzai 2/19 (6 overs)

Band-e-Amir Region won by 6 wickets
Kandahar International Cricket Stadium, Kandahar
Umpires: Ahmed Shah Pakteen and Izatullah Safi
Player of the match: Amir Hamza (Band-e-Amir Region)

- Band-e-Amir Region won the toss and elected to field.

11 October 2020
Scorecard

Mis Ainak Region; 182 (48.4 overs)	v	Speen Ghar Region; 145 (34.1 overs)
Ghamai Zadran 57 (75); Samiullah Shinwari 4/30 (8.4 overs)		Qais Ahmad 35 (42); Haseebullah 5/39 (9.1 overs)

Mis Ainak Region won by 37 runs
Kandahar International Cricket Stadium, Kandahar
Umpires: Mehmood Kharotai and Farooq Khan
Player of the match: Haseebullah (Mis Ainak Region)

- Speen Ghar Region won the toss and elected to field.
- Haseebullah (Mis Ainak Region) made his List A debut.

12 October 2020
Scorecard

Boost Region; 216/5 (50 overs)	v	Amo Region; 217/3 (45.2 overs)
Nasir Jamal 70 (98); Nangialai Kharoti 2/40 (10 overs)		Javed Ahmadi 125* (130); Yamin Ahmadzai 1/31 (9 overs); Mohammad Alam 1/31 (9 overs)

Amo Region won by 7 wickets
Kandahar International Cricket Stadium, Kandahar
Umpires: Ahmed Shah Durrani and Ajmal Shamolzi
Player of the match: Javed Ahmadi (Amo Region)

- Amo Region won the toss and elected to field.
- Qudratullah (Boost Region), Ijaz Ahmad and Nangialai Kharoti (Amo Region) all made their List A debuts.

13 October 2020
Scorecard

Band-e-Amir Region; 277/4 (50 overs)	v	Speen Ghar Region; 233 (49.2 overs)
Darwish Rasooli 106* (102); Tahir Khan 2/35 (10 overs)		Zubaid Akbari 78 (107); Nijat Masood 3/38 (9.2 overs)

Band-e-Amir Region won by 44 runs
Kandahar International Cricket Stadium, Kandahar
Umpires: Mehmood Kharotai and Ajmal Shamolzi
Player of the match: Darwish Rasooli (Band-e-Amir Region)

- Speen Ghar Region won the toss and elected to field.

14 October 2020
Scorecard

Mis Ainak Region; 149 (42 overs)	v	Amo Region; 153/4 (32.3 overs)
Shahidullah 28 (41); Sharafuddin Ashraf 5/29 (10 overs)		Zahid Zakhail 42 (81); Zahir Khan 2/42 (9 overs)

Amo Region won by 6 wickets
Kandahar International Cricket Stadium, Kandahar
Umpires: Farooq Khan and Izatullah Safi
Player of the match: Sharafuddin Ashraf (Amo Region)

- Amo Region won the toss and elected to field.
- Noor Ahmad (Mis Ainak Region) made his List A debut.

15 October 2020
Scorecard

Speen Ghar Region; 263/6 (50 overs)	v	Boost Region; 152 (39.3 overs)
Ikram Alikhil 51* (49); Nasir Jamal 2/17 (4 overs)		Nasir Jamal 45 (48); Farhad Momand 3/33 (9 overs)

Speen Ghar Region won by 111 runs
Kandahar International Cricket Stadium, Kandahar
Umpires: Mehmood Kharotai and Ahmed Shah Pakteen
Player of the match: Farhad Momand (Speen Ghar Region)

- Boost Region won the toss and elected to field.
- Nawid Mohammad Kabir (Boost Region) made his List A debut.

16 October 2020
Scorecard

Band-e-Amir Region; 273/7 (50 overs)	v	Mis Ainak Region; 277/5 (50 overs)
Hazratullah Zazai 59 (54); Zahir Khan 3/29 (10 overs)		Asghar Atal 81 (93); Nijat Masood 2/61 (10 overs)

Mis Ainak Region won by 5 wickets
Kandahar International Cricket Stadium, Kandahar
Umpires: Farooq Khan and Ajmal Shamolzi
Player of the match: Asghar Atal (Mis Ainak Region)

- Mis Ainak Region won the toss and elected to field.
- Shafiqullah Ghafari (Band-e-Amir Region) made his List A debut.

17 October 2020
Scorecard

Speen Ghar Region; 147 (41.5 overs)	v	Amo Region; 148/5 (40.4 overs)
Ikram Alikhil 29 (52); Nangialai Kharoti 3/27 (9.5 overs)		Farhan Zakhil 39 (66); Qais Ahmad 3/21 (10 overs)

Amo Region won by 5 wickets
Kandahar International Cricket Stadium, Kandahar
Umpires: Mehmood Kharotai and Ahmed Shah Durrani
Player of the match: Nangialai Kharoti (Amo Region)

- Speen Ghar Region won the toss and elected to bat.

18 October 2020
Scorecard

Boost Region; 189/9 (50 overs)	v	Mis Ainak Region; 190/8 (49.4 overs)
Nasibullah Sherdali 72 (117); Zahir Khan 3/51 (10 overs)		Rahmat Shah 45 (64); Ahmad Zia 3/28 (7 overs)

Mis Ainak Region won by 2 wickets
Kandahar International Cricket Stadium, Kandahar
Umpires: Farooq Khan and Izatullah Safi
Player of the match: Zahir Khan (Mis Ainak Region)

- Mis Ainak Region won the toss and elected to field.
- Ahmad Zia (Boost Region) made his List A debut.

19 October 2020
Scorecard

Band-e-Amir Region; 180/9 (50 overs)	v	Amo Region; 181/3 (32.1 overs)
Asif Musazai 89 (121); Nangialai Kharoti 3/35 (10 overs)		Javed Ahmadi 74 (61); Amir Hamza 2/20 (10 overs)

Amo Region won by 7 wickets
Kandahar International Cricket Stadium, Kandahar
Umpires: Ahmed Shah Pakteen and Ahmed Shah Durrani
Player of the match: Javed Ahmadi (Amo Region)

- Amo Region won the toss and elected to field.
- Asif Musazai (Band-e-Amir Region) made his List A debut.

=== Finals ===
Eliminator
20 October 2020
Scorecard

Band-e-Amir Region; 129 (33.1 overs)	v	Mis Ainak Region; 130/3 (37.4 overs)
Darwish Rasooli 52 (83); Zia-ur-Rehman 5/26 (10 overs)		Rahmat Shah 68* (96); Amir Hamza 3/22 (10 overs)

Mis Ainak Region won by 7 wickets
Kandahar International Cricket Stadium, Kandahar
Umpires: Mehmood Kharotai and Farooq Khan
Player of the match: Zia-ur-Rehman (Mis Ainak Region)

- Mis Ainak Region won the toss and elected to field.

Final
22 October 2020
Scorecard

Amo Region; 260/7 (50 overs)	v	Mis Ainak Region; 261/3 (46.1 overs)
Abdul Malik 107 (136); Zia-ur-Rehman 2/36 (10 overs)		Rahmanullah Gurbaz 128 (100); Sharafuddin Ashraf 2/60 (10 overs)

Mis Ainak Region won by 7 wickets
Kandahar International Cricket Stadium, Kandahar
Umpires: Ahmed Shah Durrani and Izatullah Safi
Player of the match: Rahmanullah Gurbaz (Mis Ainak Region)

- Mis Ainak Region won the toss and elected to field.
