= Ijaz Ahmad Ahmadzai =

Afghan cricketer

Personal information
- Full name: Ijaz Ahmad Ahmadzai
- Born: 25 June 2003 (age 23); Kabul, Afghanistan
- Batting: Right-handed
- Bowling: Right-arm medium
- Role: All-rounder

International information
- National side: Afghanistan (2024–present)
- T20I debut (cap 57): 15 March 2024 v Ireland
- Last T20I: 11 November 2025 v Qatar

Domestic team information
- Years: Team
- 2022: Boost Defenders
- 2022: Hindukush Stars
- 2022: Kabul Eagles
- 2023: Amo Sharks
- 2023: Maiwand Champions

Career statistics
Competition	T20I	FC	LA	T20
Matches	4	18	26	55
Runs scored	41	900	690	914
Batting average	10.25	29.03	38.33	24.70
100s/50s	0/0	2/6	1/5	0/3
Top score	16	110*	117	83
Balls bowled	0	262	191	12
Wickets	0	6	5	0
Bowling average	–	23.16	49.00	–
5 wickets in innings	0	0	0	0
10 wickets in match	–	–	0	–
Best bowling	–	3/31	2/3	-
Catches/stumpings	0/–	19/–	12/–	21/–
- Source: ESPNcricinfo, 20 March 2025

Ijaz Ahmad Ahmadzai (Pashto: اعجاز احمد احمدزی) (born 25 June 2003) is an Afghan cricketer, who is a right-handed batsman and a right-arm medium bowler. In December 2021, he was named in Afghanistan's squad for the 2022 Under-19 Men's Cricket World Cup.

He made his List A debut for Hindukush Stars on 18 May 2022, against Pamir Legends in the 2022 Green Afghanistan One Day Cup. He made his Twenty20 debut for Kabul Eagles on 30 July 2022, against Hindukush Stars in the 2022 Shpageeza Cricket League. He made his first-class debut for Boost Defenders on 14 October 2022, against Mis Ainak Knights in the 2022 Ahmad Shah Abdali 4-day Tournament.

In March 2024, he earned his maiden call-up to the Afghanistan cricket team for their Twenty20 International (T20I) series against Ireland. He made his T20I debut for Afghanistan on 15 March 2024, against Ireland.
