= Irish cricket team against Afghanistan in the UAE in 2023–24 =

International cricket tour

Ireland against Afghanistan in the UAE in 2023–24
	Afghanistan	Ireland
- Dates: 28 February – 18 March 2024
Captains	Hashmatullah Shahidi (Test & ODIs); Rashid Khan (T20I)	Andrew Balbirnie (Test); Paul Stirling (ODIs & T20Is)

Test series
- Result: Ireland won the 1-match series 1–0
Most runs	Hashmatullah Shahidi (75)	Lorcan Tucker (73)
Most wickets	Zia-ur-Rehman (6)	Mark Adair (8)

One Day International series
- Results: Afghanistan won the 3-match series 2–0
Most runs	Rahmanullah Gurbaz (172)	Harry Tector (141)
Most wickets	Mohammad Nabi (5); Fazalhaq Farooqi (5)	Theo van Woerkom (4)
- Player of the series: Rahmanullah Gurbaz (Afg)

Twenty20 International series
- Results: Afghanistan won the 3-match series 2–1
Most runs	Mohammad Nabi (90)	Andrew Balbirnie (76)
Most wickets	Rashid Khan (8)	Josh Little (6); Ben White (6)
- Player of the series: Rashid Khan (Afg)

The Ireland cricket team toured the United Arab Emirates in February and March 2024 to play one Test match, three One Day International (ODI) matches and three Twenty20 International (T20I) matches against Afghanistan. The Test was played in Abu Dhabi, and the ODIs and T20Is were played in Sharjah. The T20I series formed part of both teams' preparation for the 2024 ICC Men's T20 World Cup tournament. The venue for the Test was shifted from the Sheikh Zayed Cricket Stadium to the Tolerance Oval, just a week before the match.

Ireland won the Test match by six wickets. This was Ireland's first ever Test win, at the eighth attempt. Afghanistan won the ODI series 2–0, with the second match abandoned due to rain. Afghanistan won the T20I series 2-1.

== Squads ==
Afghanistan			Ireland		
Test	ODIs	T20Is	Test	ODIs	T20Is
Hashmatullah Shahidi (c); Rahmat Shah (vc); Ikram Alikhil (wk); Khalil Gurbaz; Rahmanullah Gurbaz (wk); Mohammad Ibrahim; Nasir Jamal; Karim Janat; Zahir Khan; Abdul Malik; Nijat Masood; Bahir Shah; Ibrahim Zadran; Naveed Zadran; Noor Ali Zadran; Zia-ur-Rehman	Hashmatullah Shahidi (c); Rahmat Shah (vc); Fareed Ahmad; Noor Ahmad; Ikram Alikhil (wk); Fazal Haq Farooqi; Allah Mohammad Ghazanfar; Rahmanullah Gurbaz (wk); Riaz Hassan; Nangialai Kharoti; Mohammad Nabi; Gulbadin Naib; Azmatullah Omarzai; Bilal Sami; Ibrahim Zadran; Naveed Zadran	Rashid Khan (c); Fareed Ahmad; Ijaz Ahmad Ahmadzai; Noor Ahmad; Sediqullah Atal; Fazalhaq Farooqi; Rahmanullah Gurbaz (wk); Naveen-ul-Haq; Mohammad Ishaq; Nangialai Kharoti; Wafadar Momand; Mohammad Nabi; Azmatullah Omarzai; Mujeeb Ur Rahman; Ibrahim Zadran	Andrew Balbirnie (c); Mark Adair; Curtis Campher; George Dockrell; Matthew Foster; Graham Hume; Andy McBrine; Barry McCarthy; James McCollum; PJ Moor (wk); Paul Stirling; Harry Tector; Lorcan Tucker (wk); Theo van Woerkom; Craig Young	Paul Stirling (c); Mark Adair; Andrew Balbirnie; Curtis Campher; Gareth Delany; George Dockrell; Matthew Foster; Graham Hume; Andy McBrine; Barry McCarthy; Neil Rock (wk); Harry Tector; Lorcan Tucker (wk); Theo van Woerkom; Craig Young	Paul Stirling (c); Mark Adair; Ross Adair; Andrew Balbirnie; Curtis Campher; Gareth Delany; George Dockrell; Graham Hume; Josh Little; Barry McCarthy; Neil Rock (wk); Harry Tector; Lorcan Tucker (wk); Ben White; Craig Young

== Only Test ==
28 February–1 March 2024
Scorecard

Afghanistan	v	Ireland
155 (54.5 overs); Ibrahim Zadran 53 (83); Mark Adair 5/39 (16.5 overs)		263 (83.4 overs); Paul Stirling 52 (89); Zia-ur-Rehman 5/64 (30 overs)
218 (75.4 overs); Hashmatullah Shahidi 55 (107); Craig Young 3/24 (10.4 overs)		111/4 (31.3 overs); Andrew Balbirnie 58* (96); Naveed Zadran 2/31 (9.3 overs)

Ireland won by 6 wickets
Tolerance Oval, Abu Dhabi
Umpires: Adrian Holdstock (SA) and Richard Kettleborough (Eng)
Player of the match: Mark Adair (Ire)

- Afghanistan won the toss and elected to bat.
- Rahmanullah Gurbaz (Afg), Barry McCarthy, Craig Young and Theo van Woerkom (Ire) all made their Test debuts.
- This was the first men's Test to be played at the venue.
- Mark Adair (Ire) took his first five-wicket haul in Tests.
- Zia-ur-Rehman (Afg) took his first five-wicket haul in Tests.
- This was Ireland's first victory in men's Test cricket.

== ODI series ==
=== 1st ODI ===
7 March 2024
15:30 (D/N)
Scorecard

Afghanistan; 310/5 (50 overs)	v	Ireland; 275/8 (50 overs)
Rahmanullah Gurbaz 121 (117); Theo van Woerkom 3/55 (10 overs)		Harry Tector 138 (147); Fazalhaq Farooqi 4/51 (10 overs)

Afghanistan won by 35 runs
Sharjah Cricket Stadium, Sharjah
Umpires: Ahmed Shah Durrani (Afg) and Paul Reiffel (Aus)
Player of the match: Rahmanullah Gurbaz (Afg)

- Ireland won the toss and elected to field.
- Allah Mohammad Ghazanfar (Afg) made his ODI debut.

=== 2nd ODI ===
9 March 2024
15:30 (D/N)
Scorecard

Afghanistan	v	Ireland

Match abandoned
Sharjah Cricket Stadium, Sharjah
Umpires: Paul Reiffel (Aus) and Izatullah Safi (Afg)

- The match was called off due to a storm forecast.

=== 3rd ODI ===
12 March 2024
15:30 (D/N)
Scorecard

Afghanistan; 236/9 (50 overs)	v	Ireland; 119 (35 overs)
Hashmatullah Shahidi 69 (103); Mark Adair 3/51 (10 overs)		Paul Stirling 50 (53); Mohammad Nabi 5/17 (10 overs)

Afghanistan won by 117 runs
Sharjah Cricket Stadium, Sharjah
Umpires: Paul Reiffel (Aus) and Ahmed Shah Pakteen (Afg)
Player of the match: Mohammad Nabi (Afg)

- Ireland won the toss and elected to field.
- Nangialai Kharoti and Naveed Zadran (Afg) both made their ODI debuts.
- Mohammad Nabi (Afg) took his first five-wicket haul in ODIs.

== T20I series ==
=== 1st T20I ===
15 March 2024
20:00 (N)
Scorecard

Ireland; 149/6 (20 overs)	v	Afghanistan; 111 (18.4 overs)
Harry Tector 56* (34); Rashid Khan 3/19 (4 overs)		Mohammad Ishaq 32 (22); Ben White 4/20 (4 overs)

Ireland won by 38 runs
Sharjah Cricket Stadium, Sharjah
Umpires: Ahmed Shah Durrani (Afg) and Ahmed Shah Pakteen (Afg)
Player of the match: Ben White (Ire)

- Afghanistan won the toss and elected to field.
- Ijaz Ahmad Ahmadzai and Nangialai Kharoti (Afg) both made their T20I debuts.

=== 2nd T20I ===
17 March 2024
20:00 (N)
Scorecard

Afghanistan; 152/9 (20 overs)	v	Ireland; 142/8 (20 overs)
Mohammad Nabi 59 (38); Mark Adair 3/27 (4 overs)		Andrew Balbirnie 45 (44); Rashid Khan 4/14 (4 overs)

Afghanistan won by 10 runs
Sharjah Cricket Stadium, Sharjah
Umpires: Ahmed Shah Durrani (Afg) and Bismillah Jan Shinwari
Player of the match: Rashid Khan (Afg)

- Afghanistan won the toss and elected to bat.

=== 3rd T20I ===
18 March 2024
20:00 (N)
Scorecard

Afghanistan; 155/7 (20 overs)	v	Ireland; 98 (17.2 overs)
Ibrahim Zadran 72* (51); Gareth Delany 1/5 (1 over)		Curtis Campher 28 (23); Azmatullah Omarzai 4/9 (4 overs)

Afghanistan won by 57 runs
Sharjah Cricket Stadium, Sharjah
Umpires: Bismillah Jan Shinwari (Afg) and Izatullah Safi (Afg)
Player of the match: Ibrahim Zadran (Afg)

- Afghanistan won the toss and elected to bat.
