= 2019 Afghanistan Provincial Challenge Cup =

Cricket tournament

- Dates: 31 July – 10 August 2019
- Administrator(s): Afghanistan Cricket Board
- Cricket format: List A
- Tournament format(s): Round-robin, knockout
- Champions: Nangarhar Province (1st title)
- Participants: 8
- Matches: 15
- Player of the series: Zubaid Akbari
- Most runs: Munir Ahmad (348)
- Most wickets: Nijat Masood (17)

The 2019 Afghanistan Provincial Challenge Cup was a List A cricket competition that took place in Afghanistan between 31 July and 10 August 2019. It was the third year of domestic List A cricket to be played in Afghanistan, following the announcements by the International Cricket Council (ICC) in February and May 2017. Eight teams qualified for the tournament, and were divided into two groups of four.

Nangarhar Province won the tournament, after beating Kabul Province by six wickets in the final, with Najeeb Tarakai scoring a century.

== Points table ==
Pool A

Team	Pld	W	L	T	NR	Pts
Khost Province	3	2	1	0	0	4
Kandahar Province	3	2	1	0	0	4
Paktia Province	3	1	2	0	0	2
Balkh Province	3	1	2	0	0	2

Team qualified for the finals

Pool B

Team	Pld	W	L	T	NR	Pts
Nangarhar Province	3	3	0	0	0	6
Kabul Province	3	2	1	0	0	4
Logar Province	3	1	2	0	0	2
Herat Province	3	0	3	0	0	0

Team qualified for the finals

== Fixtures ==
=== Group A ===
31 July 2019
09:00
Scorecard

Paktia Province; 85 (31.4 overs)	v	Khost Province; 86/1 (16.1 overs)
Sadiqullah 30 (54); Khalil Gurbaz 4/17 (5.4 overs)		Emal 33* (48); Kabir Alikhail 1/14 (5 overs)

Khost Province won by 9 wickets
Khost Cricket Stadium, Khost
Umpires: Ahmed Shah Durrani and Ajmal Shamolzi
Player of the match: Khalil Gurbaz (Khost Province)

- Khost Province won the toss and elected to field.
- Nimatullah, Bismillah Zadran, Naseer Ahmad, Abid Sadaf, Ihsanullah, Emal, Khalil Gurbaz, Nasim Mangal, Niamat Khoshal (Khost Province), Yousuf Shah, Sadam Totakhil, Rahman Zurmatia, Sadiqullah, Akmal Orya, Amir Zazai, Ishaq Saqi, Sami Totakhil and Sami Zadran (Paktia Province) all made their List A debuts.

1 August 2019
09:00
Scorecard

Kandahar Province; 309/7 (50 overs)	v	Balkh Province; 103 (24.1 overs)
Baqibullah 58* (36); M Aleem 3/45 (8 overs)		Mohammad Wasim Mandozai 20 (30); Baqibullah 4/32 (8.1 overs)

Kandahar Province won by 206 runs
Khost Cricket Stadium, Khost
Umpires: Ahmed Shah Durrani and Farooq Khan
Player of the match: Baqibullah (Kandahar Province)

- Balkh Province won the toss and elected to field.
- Mohammad Wasim Mandozai, Abdul Razaq, M Aleem, Azim Khan, Hassan, Ibrahim, Ihsanullah, Rozaddin (Balkh Province), Nasibullah Sherdali, Ali Ahmad, Ahmad Zahir, Baqibullah, Najibullah, Ahmadullah and Ahmad Khan (Kandahar Province) all made their List A debuts.

2 August 2019
09:00
Scorecard

Balkh Province; 192 (45.1 overs)	v	Paktia Province; 150 (38.4 overs)
Abdullah Mazari 58 (83); Amir Zazai 4/27 (9 overs)		Saifullah 42 (50); Abdullah Mazari 4/43 (9.4 overs)

Balkh Province won by 42 runs
Khost Cricket Stadium, Khost
Umpires: Ahmed Shah Pakteen and Ahmed Shah Durrani
Player of the match: Abdullah Mazari (Balkh Province)

- Paktia Province won the toss and elected to field.
- Kamil (Balkh Province), Safiullah, Janat Mir Zadran and Riaz (Paktia Province) all made their List A debuts.

3 August 2019
09:00
Scorecard

Kandahar Province; 245/9 (50 overs)	v	Khost Province; 218 (47.5 overs)
Munir Ahmad 69 (87); Bakhtarullah Atal 3/55 (10 overs)		Emal 138 (151); Waqarullah Ishaq 5/41 (10 overs)

Kandahar Province won by 27 runs
Khost Cricket Stadium, Khost
Umpires: Farooq Khan and Ajmal Shamolzi
Player of the match: Waqarullah Ishaq (Kandahar Province)

- Khost Province won the toss and elected to field.
- Nazifullah (Kandahar Province) and Ihsanullah (Khost Province) both made their List A debuts.

4 August 2019
09:00
Scorecard

Khost Province; 203/9 (50 overs)	v	Balkh Province; 165 (43 overs)
Mohammadullah 54* (78); Asadullah Matani 4/52 (10 overs)		Mohammad Wasim Mandozai 60 (30); Nimatullah 4/44 (10 overs)

Khost Province won by 38 runs
Khost Cricket Stadium, Khost
Umpires: Ahmed Shah Pakteen and Ahmed Shah Durrani
Player of the match: Nasim Mangal (Khost Province)

- Khost Province won the toss and elected to bat.
- Zafar Balkh (Balkh Province), Asghar Atal, Mohammadullah and Ihsanullah (Khost Province) all made their List A debuts.

5 August 2019
09:00
Scorecard

Kandahar Province; 207 (49.5 overs)	v	Paktia Province; 209/4 (28.5 overs)
Munir Ahmad 123* (136); Dawood Ahmadzai 2/28 (8 overs)		Dawood Ahmadzai 79 (66); Munir Ahmad 1/6 (1 over)

Paktia Province won by 6 wickets
Khost Cricket Stadium, Khost
Umpires: Farooq Khan and Ajmal Shamolzi
Player of the match: Dawood Ahmadzai (Paktia Province)

- Paktia Province won the toss and elected to field.
- Bilal Ahmad, Ansarullah, Fawad Ahmad (Kandahar Province), Imran Dawlatzai, Izatullah Zazy, Izat Shah Zadran, Abdul Latif Husainkhil and Dawood Ahmadzai (Paktia Province) all made their List A debuts.

=== Group B ===
31 July 2019
09:00
Scorecard

Nangarhar Province; 277/9 (50 overs)	v	Kabul Province; 200 (31.2 overs)
Najeeb Tarakai 74 (85); Nijat Masood 3/51 (10 overs)		Mohammad Sardar 63 (62); Wali Agha 3/42 (8.2 overs)

Nangarhar Province won by 77 runs
Ghazi Amanullah International Cricket Stadium, Jalalabad
Umpires: Bismillah Jan Shinwari and Mahmood Kharoti
Player of the match: Najeeb Tarakai (Nangarhar Province)

- Kabul Province won the toss and elected to field.
- Amanullah Rafiqi, Wasim Zazai, Mirwais, Izharulhaq Naveed, Noman, Safiullah (Kabul Province), Abid Mohammadi, Zubaid Akbari, Yasin, Nasim Surkhrodai, Farhad Momand, Akbar Musazai, Wali Agha and Hassan (Nangarhar Province) all made their List A debuts.

1 August 2019
09:00
Scorecard

Herat Province; 190 (43.2 overs)	v	Logar Province; 191/6 (39.3 overs)
Abdul Ghani 68 (84); Said Khan 6/42 (9.2 overs)		Asad Khan 75 (73); Abdul Rahman 2/31 (7.3 overs)

Logar Province won by 4 wickets
Ghazi Amanullah International Cricket Stadium, Jalalabad
Umpires: Bismillah Jan Shinwari and Muhammad Sabir
Player of the match: Said Khan (Logar Province)

- Logar Province won the toss and elected to field.
- Mohammad Younus, Akbar Ali, Mohammad Kabir, Mohammad Ibrahim, Abdul Ghani, Abdullah Tarakhail, Ahmad Wali, Ainuddin Kakar, Hamayoun, Abdul Rahman (Herat Province), Samiullah Ihsas, Mohammad Sabir, Abdul Qadeer, Asad Khan, Baseer Khan, Khalid Zahedi, Ali Ahmad, Mohammadullah, Mohammad Zahir, Said Khan and Zakiullah Sultani (Logar Province) all made their List A debuts.

2 August 2019
09:00
Scorecard

Nangarhar Province; 327/8 (50 overs)	v	Herat Province; 222 (45.3 overs)
Abid Mohammadi 116 (122); Mohammad Alam 2/38 (10 overs)		Fahim 49 (74); Zubaid Akbari 3/35 (9 overs)

Nangarhar Province won by 105 runs
Ghazi Amanullah International Cricket Stadium, Jalalabad
Umpires: Bismillah Jan Shinwari and Muhammad Sabir
Player of the match: Abid Mohammadi (Nangarhar Province)

- Nangarhar Province won the toss and elected to bat.
- Mir Zaman, Imran Anwar and Fahim (Herat Province) all made their List A debuts.

3 August 2019
09:00
Scorecard

Logar Province; 254/9 (50 overs)	v	Kabul Province; 256/8 (49.5 overs)
Mohammad Sabir 93 (85); Nijat Masood 3/51 (9 overs)		Zia-ul-Haq 107* (115); Said Khan 3/48 (10 overs)

Kabul Province won by 2 wickets
Ghazi Amanullah International Cricket Stadium, Jalalabad
Umpires: Mahmood Kharoti and Muhammad Sabir
Player of the match: Zia-ul-Haq (Kabul Province)

- Logar Province won the toss and elected to bat.
- Bilal, Mohammad Iqbal, Ziaulhaq (Kabul Province), Mohammad Amin and Musa Khan (Logar Province) all made their List A debuts.

4 August 2019
09:00
Scorecard

Logar Province; 248/9 (50 overs)	v	Nangarhar Province; 252/3 (46 overs)
Mohammad Sabir 122 (125); Zubaid Akbari 4/30 (9 overs)		Abid Mohammadi 100* (110); Zahid Khan 1/14 (7 overs)

Nangarhar Province won by 7 wickets
Ghazi Amanullah International Cricket Stadium, Jalalabad
Umpires: Mahmood Kharoti and Izatullah Safi
Player of the match: Abid Mohammadi (Nangarhar Province)

- Logar Province won the toss and elected to bat.
- Allah Noor, Riaz, Wafiullah, Yousuf Khan (Nangarhar Province), Khalil and Zahid Khan (Logar Province) all made their List A debuts.

5 August 2019
09:00
Scorecard

Kabul Province; 308/8 (50 overs)	v	Herat Province; 236 (48.2 overs)
Mohammad Sardar 109 (116); Abdul Salam 2/39 (4 overs)		Ghulam Jelani 60 (79); Nijat Masood 4/53 (9.2 overs)

Kabul Province won by 72 runs
Ghazi Amanullah International Cricket Stadium, Jalalabad
Umpires: Bismillah Jan Shinwari and Izatullah Safi
Player of the match: Amanullah Rafiqi (Kabul Province)

- Kabul Province won the toss and elected to bat.
- Amin (Kabul Province), Abdul Salam and Ghulam Jelani (Herat Province) all made their List A debuts.

== Finals ==
1st semi-final
7 August 2019
09:00
Scorecard

Khost Province; 86 (27.5 overs)	v	Kabul Province; 89/0 (16.2 overs)
M Hashum 21 (32); Nijat Masood 7/23 (9.5 overs)		Bilal 55* (58)

Kabul Province won by 10 wickets
Ghazi Amanullah International Cricket Stadium, Jalalabad
Umpires: Mehmood Kharotai and Bismillah Jan Shinwari
Player of the match: Nijat Masood (Kabul Province)

- Khost Province won the toss and elected to bat.
- Shaheen, Anwar (Khost Province) and Shakirullah (Kabul Province) all made their List A debuts.

2nd semi-final
7 August 2019
09:00
Scorecard

Kandahar Province; 271 (50 overs)	v	Nangarhar Province; 272/4 (43.1 overs)
Munir Ahmad 98 (96); Wali Agha 4/43 (10 overs)		Waheedullah Shafaq 100* (88); Baqibullah 3/40 (10 overs)

Nangarhar Province won by 6 wickets
Khost Cricket Stadium, Khost
Umpires: Ahmed Shah Durrani and Farooq Khan
Player of the match: Waheedullah Shafaq (Nangarhar Province)

- Nangarhar Province won the toss and elected to field.
- Pakhtoon Sarfaraz (Nangarhar Province) made his List A debut.

Final
10 August 2019
09:00
Scorecard

Kabul Province; 273/8 (50 overs)	v	Nangarhar Province; 274/4 (47.4 overs)
Zia-ul-Haq 84 (90); Zubaid Akbari 3/52 (9 overs)		Najeeb Tarakai 121 (90); Izharulhaq Naveed 2/25 (10 overs)

Nangarhar Province won by 6 wickets
Khost Cricket Stadium, Khost
Umpires: Mehmood Kharotai and Ahmed Shah Durrani
Player of the match: Najeeb Tarakai (Nangarhar Province)

- Nangarhar Province won the toss and elected to field.
- Mashoqullah (Nangarhar Province) made his List A debut.
