= Nawid Mohammad Kabir =

Afghan cricketer (born 2001)

Personal information
- Born: 18 May 2001 (age 25)
- Source: Cricinfo, 25 April 2019

Nawid Mohammad Kabir (born 18 May 2001) is an Afghan cricketer. He made his first-class debut for Kabul Region in the 2019 Ahmad Shah Abdali 4-day Tournament on 22 April 2019. He made his List A debut on 15 October 2020, for Boost Region in the 2020 Ghazi Amanullah Khan Regional One Day Tournament.

Nawid flew over from Afghanistan and played 7 games in the 2024 season as a professional player for Northop Hall CC but halfway through the season he left without the permission of his club, and moved to Glasgow to claim asylum is now currently playing as a local player for Glasgow High/Kelvinside.
