= Jalat Khan =

Jalat Khan may refer to:

- Jalat Khan (cricketer, born 1986), Pakistani cricketer
- Jalat Khan (cricketer, born 1999), Pakistani cricketer
- Jalat Khan (Afghan cricketer), Afghan cricketer
