= Ijaz Ahmad (cricketer) =

Afghan cricketer (born 2004)

Personal information
- Full name: Ijaz Ahmad Azad
- Born: 10 January 2004 (age 22); Baghlan, Pakistan
- Batting: Right-handed

Domestic team information
- Years: Team
- 2020–2023: Amo Region
- 2018: Kabul Eagles
- 2022: Pamir Zalmi
- 2023: Pamir Legends
- Source: Cricinfo, 15 March 2024

Ijaz Ahmad Azad (born 10 January 2004) is an Afghan cricketer. He made his first-class debut for Kabul Region in the 2019 Ahmad Shah Abdali 4-day Tournament on 4 April 2019. He made his List A debut on 12 October 2020, for Amo Region in the 2020 Ghazi Amanullah Khan Regional One Day Tournament. He made his Twenty20 debut for Pamir Zalmi on 25 July 2022, against Mis Ainak Knights in the 2022 Shpageeza Cricket League.
