= Wasim Zazai =

Afghan cricketer (born 1999)

Personal information
- Born: 3 March 1999 (age 27); Paktia, Afghanistan
- Source: Cricinfo, 31 July 2019

Wasim Zazai (born 3 March 1999) is an Afghan cricketer. He made his List A debut for Kabul Province in the 2019 Afghanistan Provincial Challenge Cup tournament on 31 July 2019. He made his Twenty20 debut on 8 September 2020, for Kabul Eagles in the 2020 Shpageeza Cricket League.
