= Hasan Safai =

Afghan cricketer (born 2001)

Personal information
- Born: 19 November 2001 (age 24)
- Source: Cricinfo, 1 May 2019

Hasan Safai (born 19 November 2001) is an Afghan cricketer. He made his first-class debut for Kabul Region in the 2019 Ahmad Shah Abdali 4-day Tournament on 29 April 2019.
