= Nasir Ahmed =

Nasir Ahmed, or variant spellings, may refer to:

- Nasir Ahmed (Bangladeshi cricketer) (born 1964), Bangladeshi cricketer
- Nasir Ahmed (field hockey) (born 1984), Pakistani field hockey player
- Nasir Ahmed (engineer) (born 1940), Indian-American electrical engineer and computer scientist
- Naseer Ahmed (wrestler) (born 1972), Pakistani wrestler
- Naseer Ahmed (politician), Pakistani politician
- Naseer Ahmad (born 1995), Afghan cricketer
- Nasir Ahmed, fictional character and main narrator of the Gangs of Wasseypur Indian films, played by Piyush Mishra

== See also ==
- Mirza Nasir Ahmad (1909–1982), leader of Ahmadiyya Muslims
