= Mohammad Kabir =

Mohammad Kabir may refer to:

- Kabir Khan (cricketer) (born 1974), Pakistani cricket coach and player
- Mohammad Kabir (Afghan cricketer)
- Mohammad Kabir Hassan, Bangladeshi-American economist
