= Ishaq Zazai =

Afghan cricketer (born 2003)

Personal information
- Born: 27 June 2003 (age 23)
- Source: Cricinfo, 6 April 2019

Ishaq Zazai (born 27 June 2003) is an Afghan cricketer. He made his first-class debut for Kabul Region in the 2019 Ahmad Shah Abdali 4-day Tournament on 4 April 2019. He made his Twenty20 debut on 9 October 2019, for Speen Ghar Tigers in the 2019 Shpageeza Cricket League.
