= Zahid Khan =

Zahid Khan may refer to:

- Zahid Khan (cricketer) (born 2002), Afghan cricketer
- Zahid Khan (politician) (born 1956), Pakistani politician
- Zahid Ali Khan, Indian journalist
- Zahid Ali Akbar Khan, Pakistan Army engineering officer

== See also ==
- Zahida Khan (disambiguation)
