= 2017 Ghazi Amanullah Khan Regional One Day Tournament =

Cricket tournament

- Dates: 10 August 2017 – 19 August 2017
- Administrator: Afghanistan Cricket Board
- Cricket format: List A
- Tournament format(s): Round-robin, knockout
- Champions: Speen Ghar Region (1st title)
- Participants: 5
- Matches: 13
- Most runs: Rahim Mangal (276)
- Most wickets: Karim Janat (12); Zahir Khan (12)

The 2017 Ghazi Amanullah Khan Regional One Day Tournament was a List A cricket competition that took place in Afghanistan from 10 to 19 August 2017. It was the first edition of the competition to be played with List A status, following the announcements by the International Cricket Council (ICC) in February and May 2017. Five teams competed; Amo Region, Band-e-Amir Region, Boost Region, Mis Ainak Region and Speen Ghar Region. Speen Ghar Region won the tournament, beating Boost Region by five wickets in the final.

== Fixtures ==
=== Points table ===
Team	Pld	W	L	T	NRR	Pts
Band-e-Amir Region	4	4	0	0	+0.594	8
Speen Ghar Region	4	2	2	0	+0.822	4
Amo Region	4	2	2	0	+0.155	4
Boost Region	4	2	2	0	+0.097	4
Mis Ainak Region	4	0	4	0	–1.740	0

Team qualified for the semi-finals

=== Round robin ===
10 August 2017
Scorecard

Band-e-Amir Region; 194 (46.3 overs)	v	Speen Ghar Region; 134 (23.1 overs)
Rahim Mangal 43 (64); Amir Hamza 3/26 (8.3 overs)		Usman Ghani 40 (54); Zahir Khan 6/36 (6.1 overs)

Band-e-Amir Region won by 60 runs
Khost Cricket Ground, Khost City
Umpires: Ahmed Shah Pakteen and Mehmood Kharotai
Player of the match: Zahir Khan (Band-e-Amir Region)

- Speen Ghar Region won the toss and elected to field.
- Rahim Mangal, Arif Khan, Shawkat Zaman, Zahir Khan, Yousuf Zazai (Band-e-Amir Region); Tahir Khan, Rashid Zadran and Mujeeb Ur Rahman (Speen Ghar Region) all made their List A debuts.

10 August 2017
Scorecard

Amo Region; 263/9 (50 overs)	v	Mis Ainak Region; 135 (42.3 overs)
Ghamai Zadran 76 (119); Sayed Nasratullah 3/29 (10 overs)		Noor-ul-Haq 31 (65); Muslim Musa 3/28 (8 overs)

Amo Region won by 128 runs
Khost Cricket Ground, Khost City
Umpires: Bismillah Jan Shinwari and Izatullah Safi
Player of the match: Ghamai Zadran (Amo Region)

- Mis Ainak Region won the toss and elected to field.
- Nijat Masood, Javid Rahimi, Mohammad Sardar, Fitratullah Khawari, Azmatullah Omarzai, Kabir Alikhail, (Mis Ainak Region); Ghamai Zadran, Hazratullah Zazai, Munir Ahmad, Muslim Musa and Zahir Shehzad (Amo Region) all made their List A debuts.

11 August 2017
Scorecard

Speen Ghar Region; 237 (49.5 overs)	v	Boost Region; 238/8 (50 overs)
Zia-ul-Haq 76 (123); Wafadar 4/41 (10 overs)		Gulbadin Naib 60 (58); Karim Janat 3/40 (9 overs)

Boost Region won by 2 wickets
Khost Cricket Ground, Khost City
Umpires: Farooq Khan and Mehmood Kharotai
Player of the match: Gulbadin Naib (Boost Region)

- Boost Region won the toss and elected to field.
- Wafadar (Boost Region); Zia-ul-Haq and Rokhan Zarmalwal (Speen Ghar Region) all made their List A debuts.

11 August 2017
Scorecard

Mis Ainak Region; 283/7 (50 overs)	v	Band-e-Amir Region; 284/5 (47.4 overs)
Rahmat Shah 100 (87); Arif Khan 2/38 (10 overs)		Arif Khan 74 (74); Nijat Masood 2/43 (9 overs)

Band-e-Amir Region won by 5 wickets
Khost Cricket Ground, Khost City
Umpires: Ahmed Shah Durrani and Ajmal Shamolzi
Player of the match: Arif Khan (Band-e-Amir Region)

- Mis Ainak Region won the toss and elected to bat.
- Mohammad Riaz, M Hashum (Band-e-Amir Region); Ibrahim Zadran and Waqarullah Ishaq (Mis Ainak Region) all made their List A debuts.

13 August 2017
Scorecard

Boost Region; 233/8 (45 overs)	v	Amo Region; 237/3 (37.2 overs)
Ihsanullah 56 (58); Zia-ur-Rehman 4/48 (10 overs)		Ghamai Zadran 106* (115); Tariq Stanikzai 1/33 (7 overs)

Amo Region won by 7 wickets (D/L method)
Khost Cricket Ground, Khost City
Umpires: Ajmal Shamolzi and Bismillah Jan Shinwari
Player of the match: Ghamai Zadran (Amo Region)

- Boost Region won the toss and elected to bat.
- Hamayun Omar (Amo Region) and Tariq Stanikzai (Boost Region) both made their List A debuts.

13 August 2017
Scorecard

Speen Ghar Region; 319/4 (47 overs)	v	Mis Ainak Region; 194 (45.4 overs)
Usman Ghani 125 (100); Ibrahim Zadran 1/44 (8 overs)		Noor Ali Zadran 72 (86); Aftab Alam 3/48 (9 overs)

Speen Ghar Region won by 140 runs (D/L method)
Khost Cricket Ground, Khost City
Umpires: Ahmed Shah Pakteen and Izatullah Safi
Player of the match: Usman Ghani (Speen Ghar)

- Speen Ghar Region won the toss and elected to bat.
- Darwish Rasooli (Speen Ghar Region) and Ajmal Khan (Mis Ainak Region) both made their List A debuts.

14 August 2017
Scorecard

Amo Region; 152 (38.4 overs)	v	Band-e-Amir Region; 156/5 (42.1 overs)
Muslim Musa 44 (39); Zahir Khan 3/34 (8 overs)		Nasir Jamal 53 (74); Zahir Shehzad 2/33 (10 overs)

Band-e-Amir Region won by 5 wickets
Khost Cricket Ground, Khost City
Umpires: Abdullah and Bismillah Jan Shinwari
Player of the match: Afsar Zazai (Band-e-Amir Region)

- Band-e-Amir Region won the toss and elected to field.

14 August 2017
Scorecard

Mis Ainak Region; 313 (50 overs)	v	Boost Region; 316/3 (41.2 overs)
Noor Ali Zadran 110 (104); Karim Sadiq 5/50 (10 overs)		Karim Sadiq 88 (52); Ibrahim Zadran 2/54 (9 overs)

Boost Region won by 7 wickets
Khost Cricket Ground, Khost City
Umpires: Ahmed Shah Durrani and Farooq Khan
Player of the match: Karim Sadiq (Boost Region)

- Boost Region won the toss and elected to field.
- Sadiq Farhad (Mis Ainak Region) made his List A debut.

16 August 2017
Scorecard

Speen Ghar Region; 290/6 (50 overs)	v	Amo Region; 207/6 (50 overs)
Darwish Rasooli 130* (98); Javed Ahmadi 2/53 (10 overs)		Nasir Khan 53 (83); Ziaur Rahman 3/30 (8 overs)

Speen Ghar Region won by 83 runs
Khost Cricket Ground, Khost City
Umpires: Abdullah and Izatullah Safi
Player of the match: Darwish Rasooli (Speen Ghar Region)

- Amo Region won the toss and elected to field.
- Ziaur Rahman (Speen Ghar Region) and Ihsanullah Mandozai (Amo Region) both made their List A debuts.

16 August 2017
Scorecard

Boost Region; 259/8 (50 overs)	v	Band-e-Amir Region; 260/6 (49 overs)
Najeeb Tarakai 92 (81); Yousuf Zazai 2/35 (10 overs)		Rahim Mangal 100 (123); Bakhtarullah Atal 2/34 (6 overs)

Band-e-Amir Region won by 4 wickets
Khost Cricket Ground, Khost City
Umpires: Ahmed Shah Pakteen and Mehmood Kharotai
Player of the match: Rahim Mangal (Band-e-Amir Region)

- Band-e-Amir Region won the toss and elected to field.
- Asadullah Matani (Band-e-Amir Region); Imran Mir, Ihsanullah Ihsan and Bakhtarullah Atal (Boost Region) all made their List A debuts.

=== Finals ===
1st Semi-final
17 August 2017
Scorecard

Boost Region; 296/8 (50 overs)	v	Band-e-Amir Region; 290/9 (50 overs)
Karim Sadiq 90 (88); Abdullah Adil 5/54 (10 overs)		Nasir Jamal 100 (78); Bakhtarullah Atal 4/60 (10 overs)

Boost Region won by 6 runs
Khost Cricket Ground, Khost City
Umpires: Ahmed Shah Durrani and Bismillah Jan Shinwari
Player of the match: Karim Sadiq (Boost Region)

- Band-e-Amir Region won the toss and elected to field.

2nd Semi-final
17 August 2017
Scorecard

Speen Ghar Region; 264/6 (50 overs)	v	Amo Region; 203 (42.5 overs)
Zia-ul-Haq 50 (79); Zahir Shehzad 2/42 (10 overs)		Younas Ahmadzai 75 (77); Yamin Ahmadzai 5/39 (8.5 overs)

Speen Ghar Region won by 61 runs
Khost Cricket Ground, Khost City
Umpires: Izatullah Safi and Mehmood Kharotai
Player of the match: Yamin Ahmadzai (Speen Ghar Region)

- Speen Ghar Region won the toss and elected to bat.

Final
19 August 2017
Scorecard

Boost Region; 147 (43.2 overs)	v	Speen Ghar Region; 150/5 (23.1 overs)
Tariq Stanikzai 48 (77); Karim Janat 5/41 (10 overs)		Darwish Rasooli 68* (54); Gulbadin Naib 4/33 (8 overs)

Speen Ghar Region won by 5 wickets
Ghazi Amanullah Khan International Cricket Stadium, Ghazi Amanullah Khan Town
Umpires: Ahmed Shah Pakteen and Mehmood Kharotai
Player of the match: Karim Janat (Speen Ghar Region)

- Speen Ghar Region won the toss and elected to field.
