= Mohammad Zahir =

Mohammad Zahir may refer to:

- Mohammad Zahir Shah (1914 – 2007), the last king of Afghanistan
- Mohammad Zahir (cricketer) (born 1997), Afghan cricketer
- Mohamed Zahir, Maldivian Chief of Defence Force from 1996 to 2008
