= Mohammad Wasim =

Mohammad Wasim or Muhammad Wasim may refer to:

- Mohammad Wasim (boxer) (born 1987), Pakistani boxer
- Mohammad Wasim (cricketer, born 2001), Pakistani cricketer

== See also ==
- Mohammad Wasim Abbasi (born 1978), Pakistani cricketer and coach
- Mohammad Wasim Mandozai (born 1993), Afghan cricketer
