= Islam Zazai =

Afghan cricketer (born 2002)

Personal information
- Born: 2 December 2002 (age 23); Paktia, Transitional Islamic State of Afghanistan
- Source: Cricinfo, 19 April 2019

Islam Zazai (born 2 December 2002) is an Afghan cricketer. He made his first-class debut for Kabul Region in the 2019 Ahmad Shah Abdali 4-day Tournament on 16 April 2019.
