= Azim Khan (cricketer) =

Afghan cricketer (born 1999)

Personal information
- Born: 15 September 1999 (age 27)
- Source: Cricinfo, 1 August 2019

Azim Khan (born 15 September 1999) is an Afghan cricketer. He made his List A debut for Balkh Province in the 2019 Afghanistan Provincial Challenge Cup tournament on 1 August 2019.
