= Mohammad Sabir (cricketer, born 2002) =

Afghan cricketer (born 2002)

Personal information
- Born: 4 October 2002 (age 24)
- Source: Cricinfo, 6 April 2019

Mohammad Sabir (born 4 October 2002) is an Afghan cricketer. He made his first-class debut for Kabul Region in the 2019 Ahmad Shah Abdali 4-day Tournament on 4 April 2019. He made his List A debut for Logar Province in the 2019 Afghanistan Provincial Challenge Cup tournament on 1 August 2019.
