= Abid Mohammadi =

Afghan cricketer (born 2002)

Personal information
- Born: 31 December 2002 (age 23)
- Batting: Left-handed
- Bowling: Left arm orthodox
- Role: Batting All-Rounder
- Source: Cricinfo, 25 April 2019

Abid Mohammadi (born 31 December 2002) is an Afghan cricketer. He made his first-class debut for Kabul Region in the 2019 Ahmad Shah Abdali 4-day Tournament on 22 April 2019. He made his List A debut for Nangarhar Province in the 2019 Afghanistan Provincial Challenge Cup tournament on 31 July 2019.

He was a member of Afghanistan's squad for the 2020 Under-19 Cricket World Cup.
