= Haseebullah =

Afghan cricketer

Personal information
- Full name: Haseebullah
- Source: Cricinfo, 12 October 2020

Haseebullah is an Afghan cricketer. He made his Twenty20 debut for Kabul Region in the final of the 2020 Shpageeza Cricket League on 16 September 2020, taking two wickets. He made his List A debut on 12 October 2020, for Mis Ainak Region in the 2020 Ghazi Amanullah Khan Regional One Day Tournament. He took a five-wicket haul, and was named the man of the match. He took ten wickets in the competition, and was named the Young Emerging Player of the tournament.
