= Ihsanullah Mandozai =

Afghan cricketer (born 1997)

Personal information
- Born: 11 May 1997 (age 29)
- Source: Cricinfo, 16 August 2017

Ihsanullah Mandozai (born 11 May 1997) is an Afghan cricketer. He made his List A debut for Amo Region in the 2017 Ghazi Amanullah Khan Regional One Day Tournament on 16 August 2017. He made his first-class debut for Amo Region in the 2017–18 Ahmad Shah Abdali 4-day Tournament on 20 October 2017.
