= Yousuf Khan (cricketer) =

Afghan cricketer (born 2002)

Personal information
- Born: 3 February 2002 (age 24)
- Source: Cricinfo, 4 August 2019

Yousuf Khan (born 3 February 2002) is an Afghan cricketer. He made his List A debut for Nangarhar Province in the 2019 Afghanistan Provincial Challenge Cup tournament on 4 August 2019.
