= Rokhan Zarmalwal =

Afghan cricketer

Cricket information
- Role: Wicket-keeper

Domestic team information
- Years: Team
- 2017–present: Speen Ghar Region
- Source: Cricinfo, 11 August 2017

Rokhan Zarmalwal is an Afghan cricketer. He made his List A debut for Speen Ghar Region in the 2017 Ghazi Amanullah Khan Regional One Day Tournament on 11 August 2017. He made his first-class debut for Band-e-Amir Region in the 2019 Ahmad Shah Abdali 4-day Tournament on 21 December 2019.
