= Nangialai Kharoti =

Afghan cricketer (born 2004)

Personal information
- Full name: Nangeyalia Kharote
- Born: 25 April 2004 (age 22); Baghlan, Afghanistan
- Batting: Left-handed
- Bowling: Slow left-arm orthodox
- Role: Bowler

International information
- National side: Afghanistan (2024–present)
- Only Test (cap 42): 6 June 2026 v India
- ODI debut (cap 60): 12 March 2024 v Ireland
- Last ODI: 17 June 2026 v India
- T20I debut (cap 58): 15 March 2024 v Ireland
- Last T20I: 11 November 2025 v Qatar

Domestic team information
- Years: Team
- 2020-present: Kabul Eagles (squad no. 100)

Career statistics
Competition	Test	ODI	T20I	FC
Matches	1	11	7	11
Runs scored	10	70	30	369
Batting average	10.00	11.66	15.00	21.70
100s/50s	0/0	0/0	0/0	0/1
Top score	6	27*	23*	67
Balls bowled	138	464	72	1,915
Wickets	0	17	5	31
Bowling average	–	18.52	15.60	30.77
5 wickets in innings	–	0	0	2
10 wickets in match	–	0	0	0
Best bowling	–	4/26	2/16	6/25
Catches/stumpings	0/–	2/–	1/–	8/–
- Source: ESPNcricinfo, 19 July 2026

Nangialai Kharoti (Pashto: ننګیالی خروټی) (also spelled Nangeyalia Kharote, born 25 April 2004) is an Afghan cricketer.

== Domestic career ==
He made his Twenty20 debut on 7 September 2020, for Kabul Eagles in the 2020 Shpageeza Cricket League. He was the joint-leading wicket-taker in the tournament, with thirteen dismissals in seven matches. He was also named the man of the match in the final of the competition, after he scored 25 runs and took two wickets, and the tournament's Best Emerging Player. He made his List A debut on 12 October 2020, for Amo Region in the 2020 Ghazi Amanullah Khan Regional One Day Tournament.

== International career ==
In March 2024, he earned his maiden call-up to the Afghanistan national cricket team for their One Day International (ODI) series against Ireland. He made his ODI debut for Afghanistan on 12 March 2024, against Ireland. Later, the same month, he was also named in the Twenty20 International (T20I) squad for the series. He made his T20I debut for Afghanistan on 15 March 2024, against Ireland.

In May 2024, he was named in Afghanistan's squad for the 2024 ICC Men's T20 World Cup tournament.
