= Baseer Khan =

Afghan cricketer (born 2001)

Personal information
- Born: 4 November 2001 (age 25)
- Source: Cricinfo, 1 August 2019

Baseer Khan (born 4 November 2001) is an Afghan cricketer. He made his List A debut for Logar Province in the 2019 Afghanistan Provincial Challenge Cup tournament on 1 August 2019.
