= Zahida Khan =

Zahida Khan may refer to:

- Zahida Khan (Pakistani politician)
- Zahida Khan (Indian politician)

== See also ==
- Zahid Khan (disambiguation)
