= Abdul Latif Ayoubi =

Afghan cricketer (born 1980)

Personal information
- Born: 3 January 1980 (age 46)
- Source: Cricinfo, 13 September 2020

Abdul Latif Ayoubi (born 3 January 1980) is an Afghan cricketer and the owner of the Kabul Eagles franchise cricket team. His bowling is described as medium-fast. He made his on-field debut as a player at the age of 40.

He made his Twenty20 debut on 13 September 2020, for the Kabul Eagles against the Speen Ghar Tigers, in the 2020 Shpageeza Cricket League. In the match he did not bat, and bowled just one over, conceding 16 runs. The Kabul Eagles went on to win the match by six wickets. Despite playing in the match, he was not a member of the squad, which drew scrutiny from the Afghanistan Cricket Board (ACB). After the match, Ayoubi was involved in a verbal altercation with a commentator. As a result, he was banned from the rest of the tournament, after breaching the ACB's disciplinary code. He was also handed a 30,000 AFN fine. Some have also suggested that Ayoubi is related to Rahmanullah Gurbaz, the team captain of the Kabul Eagles.
