= Kamran Hotak =

Afghan cricketer (born 2003)

Personal information
- Born: 7 January 2003 (age 23)
- Source: Cricinfo, 12 May 2018

Kamran Hotak (born 7 January 2003) is an Afghan cricketer. He made his first-class debut for Band-e-Amir Region in the final of the 2018 Ahmad Shah Abdali 4-day Tournament on 8 May 2018.
