= Riaz Hassan (cricketer) =

Afghan cricketer (born 2002)

Personal information
- Born: 9 July 2002 (age 24); Nangarhar, Afghanistan
- Batting: Right-handed
- Role: Batter

International information
- National side: Afghanistan
- Only Test (cap 38): 2 January 2025 v Zimbabwe
- ODI debut (cap 54): 25 January 2022 v Netherlands
- Last ODI: 20 September 2024 v South Africa

Domestic team information
- Years: Team
- 2018–present: Amo Region
- 2020: Kabul Eagles
- 2024: Band-e-Amir Dragons

Career statistics
Competition	Test	ODI	FC	LA
Matches	1	7	21	47
Runs scored	23	165	1,333	1,744
Batting average	11.50	27.50	37.02	38.75
100s/50s	0/0	0/1	3/5	4/12
Top score	12	50	196	106
Balls bowled	–	–	216	117
Wickets	–	–	3	1
Bowling average	–	–	55.00	100.00
5 wickets in innings	–	–	0	0
10 wickets in match	–	–	0	0
Best bowling	–	–	1/18	1/41
Catches/stumpings	1/–	3/–	3/–	14/–
- Source: Cricinfo, 19 July 2026

Riaz Hassan (Pashto: ریاض حسن) (born 9 July 2002) is an Afghan cricketer, who made his international debut for the national cricket team in January 2022.

He made his first-class debut for Amo Region in the 2018 Ahmad Shah Abdali 4-day Tournament on 8 April 2018. He made his List A debut for Amo Region in the 2018 Ghazi Amanullah Khan Regional One Day Tournament on 18 July 2018. He made his Twenty20 debut on 8 September 2020, for Kabul Eagles in the 2020 Shpageeza Cricket League.

== International career ==
In January 2022, he was named in Afghanistan's One Day International (ODI) squad for their series against the Netherlands in Qatar. He made his ODI debut on 25 January 2022, for Afghanistan against the Netherlands.
