= Mohammad Kabir (Afghan cricketer) =

Afghan cricketer

Personal information
- Full name: Mohammad Kabir Khan
- Source: Cricinfo, 26 November 2017

Mohammad Kabir is an Afghan cricketer. He made his first-class debut for Boost Region in the 2017–18 Ahmad Shah Abdali 4-day Tournament on 25 November 2017. He made his List A debut for Herat Province in the 2019 Afghanistan Provincial Challenge Cup tournament on 1 August 2019.
