= Khost City Ground =

Multipurpose stadium in Khost, Afghanistan

Coordinates: 33°19′58″N 69°55′12″E

- Interactive map of Khost City Ground

Ground information
- Location: Khost, Afghanistan
- Country: Afghanistan
- Establishment: 2011
- Capacity: 18,000
- Owner: Afghanistan National Olympic Committee
- Operator: Afghanistan National Olympic Committee
- Tenants: De Abasin Sape F.C. Afghanistan national football team
- End names
- n/a

International information

Team information
Afghanistan national cricket team	(2011-)
Afghanistan national football team	(2011-)
- As of June 23 2014; Source: espncricinfo

Khost City Ground (Pashto: د خوست ښار لوبغالی) is a multi-purpose stadium in Khost, Afghanistan, used for football and other sports. The ground was inaugurated in 2011.

The stadium cost more than one million dollars and it was hoped that the facility would help promote peace in the region. The stadium was constructed in three years with financial support from the Afghanistan National Olympic Committee.

The stadium has race tracks, volleyball and basketball courts, as well as a cricket ground, on 7.5 acres of land. It has the seating capacity for 18,000 spectators.

As of 2014, Germany is helping build a new cricket stadium, Khost Cricket Stadium, with €700,000 financial assistance. It will be the fourth cricket facility in the country and is being constructed on 25 acres of land with a capacity of 6,000 people.
