= Jalat Khan (Afghan cricketer) =

Afghan cricketer (born 1980)

Personal information
- Born: 10 October 1980 (age 46)
- Source: Cricinfo, 11 September 2020

Jalat Khan (born 10 October 1980) is an Afghan cricketer. He made his Twenty20 debut on 11 September 2020, for Speen Ghar Tigers in the 2020 Shpageeza Cricket League.
