= Naseer Ahmad =

Afghan cricketer (born 1995)

Personal information
- Born: 1 February 1995 (age 31); Khost, Afghanistan
- Source: Cricinfo, 31 July 2019

Naseer Ahmad (born 1 February 1995) is an Afghan cricketer. He made his List A debut for Khost Province in the 2019 Afghanistan Provincial Challenge Cup tournament on 31 July 2019.
