= Zohaib Ahmadzai =

Afghan cricketer (born 2002)

Personal information
- Full name: Zohaib Ahmadzai
- Born: 10 February 2002 (age 24); Baghlan, Afghanistan
- Batting: Right-handed
- Bowling: Slow left-arm orthodox
- Source: Cricinfo, 28 November 2017

Zohaib Ahmadzai (born 10 February 2002) is an Afghan cricketer. He made his first-class debut for Amo Region in the 2017–18 Ahmad Shah Abdali 4-day Tournament on 25 November 2017. He made his List A debut for Amo Region in the 2018 Ghazi Amanullah Khan Regional One Day Tournament on 10 July 2018. Ahmadzai was a member of Afghanistan's squad for the 2020 Under-19 Cricket World Cup.
