= Khost Cricket Stadium =

Cricket stadium in Khost, Afghanistan

Khost International Cricket Stadium د خوست نړیوال کرکټ لوبغالی
- Khost Cricket Ground
- Location: Khost, Afghanistan
- Country: Afghanistan
- Establishment: 2016; 10 years ago
- Capacity: 8,000
- Owner: Afghanistan Cricket Board
- Operator: Afghanistan Cricket Board
- Tenants: Mis Ainak Knights; Khost Province cricket team Afghanistan national cricket team

Khost International Cricket Stadium (Pashto: د خوست نړیوال کرکټ لوبغالی), also referred to as Khost Cricket Stadium (Pashto: د خوست کريکټ لوبغالی), is a cricket stadium in Khost, Afghanistan. It is owned and operated by the Afghanistan Cricket Board (ACB). Work on the cricket ground was completed on 30 December 2016, with more than 50,000 spectators present in the inaugural ceremony, a record crowd for any sport played in the country. The stadium was constructed with financial assistance from Germany.

Khost International Cricket Stadium is one of the largest cricket stadiums in Afghanistan, after Kandahar International Cricket Stadium, Ghazi Amanullah International Cricket Stadium in Ghazi Amanullah Town, and Kabul International Cricket Ground in Kabul. Khost Cricket Ground hosted the 11th edition of the Shpageeza Cricket League (Afghanistan's top-most domestic cricket competition) in July 2026, and it was for the first time that this particular tournament was held somewhere outside the capital city, Kabul.

== See also ==
- List of cricket grounds in Afghanistan
- Khost City Ground, another multi-purpose stadium in the city
- Cricket in Afghanistan
