= Akbar Musazai =

Afghan cricketer (born 1996)

Personal information
- Born: 12 May 1996 (age 30)
- Source: Cricinfo, 24 April 2018

Akbar Musazai (born 12 May 1996) is an Afghan cricketer. He made his first-class debut for Speen Ghar Region in the 2018 Ahmad Shah Abdali 4-day Tournament on 22 April 2018. He made his List A debut for Nangarhar Province in the 2019 Afghanistan Provincial Challenge Cup tournament on 31 July 2019.
