= Wahidullah Ali =

Afghan cricketer (born 1999)

Personal information
- Born: 29 November 1999 (age 26); Parwan, Afghanistan
- Source: Cricinfo, 10 September 2020

Wahidullah Ali (born 29 November 1999) is an Afghan cricketer. He made his Twenty20 debut on 10 September 2020, for Boost Defenders in the 2020 Shpageeza Cricket League.
