= Usman Adil =

Afghan cricketer (born 1994)

Personal information
- Born: 3 October 1994 (age 32); Nangarhar, Islamic State of Afghanistan
- Batting: Right-handed
- Bowling: Right-arm off break
- Role: All-rounder

Domestic team information
- Years: Team
- Kabul Zwanan
- Source: Cricinfo, 18 October 2018

Usman Adil (born 3 October 1994) is an Afghan cricketer. In September 2018, he was named in Kabul's squad in the first edition of the Afghanistan Premier League tournament. He made his Twenty20 debut for Kabul Zwanan in the 2018–19 Afghanistan Premier League on 18 October 2018.
