= Arif Khan (cricketer) =

Afghan cricketer (born 2001)

Personal information
- Full name: Arif Khan
- Born: 5 June 2001 (age 25)

Domestic team information
- Years: Team
- 2017–present: Band-e-Amir Region
- Source: Cricinfo, 10 August 2017

Arif Khan (born 5 June 2001) is an Afghan cricketer. He made his List A debut for Band-e-Amir Region in the 2017 Ghazi Amanullah Khan Regional One Day Tournament on 10 August 2017. He made his Twenty20 debut for Band-e-Amir Dragons in the 2017 Shpageeza Cricket League on 17 September 2017. He made his first-class debut for Speen Ghar Region in the 2017–18 Ahmad Shah Abdali 4-day Tournament on 7 November 2017.
