= Noor Ahmad =

Afghan cricketer (born 2005)

Personal information
- Full name: Noor Ahmad Lakanwal
- Born: 3 January 2005 (age 21); Khost, Afghanistan
- Batting: Right-handed
- Bowling: Left-arm unorthodox spin
- Role: Bowler

International information
- National side: Afghanistan (2022–present)
- ODI debut (cap 55): 30 November 2022 v Sri Lanka
- Last ODI: 28 February 2025 v Australia
- T20I debut (cap 48): 14 June 2022 v Zimbabwe
- Last T20I: 1 November 2026 v Zimbabwe

Domestic team information
- Years: Team
- 2019: Kabul region
- 2019–2020: Mis Ainak Knights
- 2020–: Mis Ainak Region
- 2020/21: Melbourne Renegades
- 2021: Karachi Kings
- 2021: Galle Gladiators
- 2022: Quetta Gladiators
- 2022: Welsh Fire
- 2023–2024: Gujarat Titans
- 2025–present: Durban's Super Giants
- 2025–present: Chennai Super Kings
- 2025: Texas Super Kings
- 2025–2026: Manchester Originals

Career statistics
Competition	ODI	T20I	FC	T20
Matches	13	30	4	230
Runs scored	46	98	85	308
Batting average	9.20	8.90	12.14	6.41
100s/50s	0/0	0/0	0/0	0/0
Top score	26	15*	47	20
Balls bowled	635	543	666	4,868
Wickets	10	25	21	261
Bowling average	64.40	27.08	19.00	23.40
5 wickets in innings	0	1	3	3
10 wickets in match	0	0	0	0
Best bowling	3/49	5/13	6/105	5/11
Catches/stumpings	1/–	5/–	1/–	51/–
- Source: ESPNcricinfo, 1 November 2026

Noor Ahmad Lakanwal (Pashto: نور احمد لکنوال) (born 3 January 2005) is an Afghan cricketer. He made his international debut for the Afghanistan national team in June 2022.

== Early life ==
Noor Ahmad was born on 3 January 2005 as the youngest of eight children. His family hails from Lakan Spinki Bori village in Khost Province.

Noor began pursuing cricket at a local academy at age 12.

== Career ==
He made his first-class debut on 29 April 2019, for Kabul Region in the 2019 Ahmad Shah Abdali 4-day Tournament. He made his Twenty20 debut on 8 October 2019, for Mis Ainak Knights in the 2019 Shpageeza Cricket League.

In December 2019, he was named in Afghanistan's squad for the 2020 Under-19 Cricket World Cup. In July 2020, he was named in the St Lucia Zouks squad for the 2020 Caribbean Premier League. He made his List A debut on 14 October 2020, for Mis Ainak Region in the 2020 Ghazi Amanullah Khan Regional One Day Tournament.

In December 2020, at the age of 15, he was signed by the Melbourne Renegades to play in the 2020–21 Big Bash League season in Australia. In March 2021, Chennai Super Kings included Noor as a net bowler in their squad for 2021 Indian Premier League. In June 2021, Noor also played for the Karachi Kings in the 2021 Pakistan Super League.

In July 2021, Noor was named in Afghanistan's One Day International (ODI) squad for their series against Pakistan. In December 2021, he was named in Afghanistan's team for the 2022 ICC Under-19 Cricket World Cup in the West Indies. Later in the same month, he was signed by the Quetta Gladiators following the players' draft in the Supplementary category for the 2022 Pakistan Super League. On 12 February 2022, he made his debut for the team, against Islamabad United at the Gaddafi Stadium in Lahore.

In February 2022, he was bought by the Gujarat Titans in the auction for the 2022 Indian Premier League tournament.

In November 2024, he was bought by the Chennai Super Kings in the auction for the 2025 Indian Premier League tournament. During his debut on 23 March 2025, he picked 4 wickets for just 18 runs against Mumbai Indians. He finished as the Chennai Super Kings's highest wicket-taker and the second highest in the tournament, with 24 wickets.

== International career ==
In May 2022, Ahmad was named in Afghanistan's Twenty20 International (T20I) squad for their series against Zimbabwe, and as a reserve in Afghanistan's One Day International (ODI) squad for the same tour. He made his T20I debut on 14 June 2022, against Zimbabwe.

Ahmad made his ODI debut on 30 November 2022, against Sri Lanka. He also made his ODI World Cup debut on 23 October 2023, playing against Pakistan in Chennai. This marked his World Cup debut at the age of 18, making him the youngest debutant in the tournament.

In May 2024, he was named in Afghanistan's squad for the 2024 ICC Men's T20 World Cup tournament.
