= List of cricket grounds in Afghanistan =

This is a list of cricket grounds in Afghanistan. The Afghan national cricket team does not play its home matches inside Afghanistan due to security threats and the lack of international standard facilities.

| Stadium | Location | Capacity | Status | Notes | Image |
|---|---|---|---|---|---|
| Kabul International Cricket Complex | Kabul, Kabul Province | 40,000 | Under construction | | |
| Ghazi Amanullah International Cricket Stadium | Ghazi Amanullah Town, Nangarhar Province | 14,000 | Completed | | |
| Kandahar International Cricket Stadium | Kandahar, Kandahar Province | 9,000 | Completed | | |
| Khost Cricket Stadium | Khost, Khost Province | 8,000 | Completed | | |
| Helmand Cricket Stadium | Lashkargah, Helmand Province | 8,000 | Completed | | |
| Jalalabad Cricket Stadium | Jalalabad, Nangarhar Province | 8,000 | Completed | | |
| Laghman Cricket Stadium | Mihtarlam, Laghman Province | 7,000 | Completed | | |
| Kabul International Cricket Stadium | Kabul, Kabul Province | 6,000 | Completed | | |
| Paktia Cricket Stadium | Gardez, Paktia Province | 6,000 | Completed | | |
| Paktika Cricket Stadium | Sharana, Paktika Province | 5,000 | Completed | | |
| Zabul Cricket Stadium | Qalat, Zabul Province | 4,000 | Completed | | |
| Ghazni Cricket Ground | Ghazni, Ghazni Province | 3,000 | Under construction | | |
| Kunar Cricket Ground | Asadabad, Kunar Province | 1,000 | Completed | Construction of the ground was funded by a $100,000 grant by the Asian Cricket Council. | |
| Balkh Cricket Stadium | Mazar-i-Sharif, Balkh Province | Unknown | Under construction | | |

== See also ==
- Cricket in Afghanistan
- Lists of stadiums
