= Farhad Momand =

Afghan cricketer (born 2000)

Personal information
- Born: 3 November 2000 (age 26)
- Source: Cricinfo, 31 July 2019

Farhad Momand (born 3 November 2000) is an Afghan cricketer. He made his List A debut for Nangarhar Province in the 2019 Afghanistan Provincial Challenge Cup tournament on 31 July 2019. He made his Twenty20 debut on 12 September 2020, for Band-e-Amir Dragons in the 2020 Shpageeza Cricket League.
