= Mohammad Wasim Mandozai =

Afghan cricketer (born 1993)

Personal information
- Born: 23 June 1993 (age 33)
- Source: Cricinfo, 15 November 2017

Mohammad Wasim Mandozai (born 23 June 1993) is an Afghan cricketer. He made his first-class debut for Amo Region in the 2017–18 Ahmad Shah Abdali 4-day Tournament on 13 November 2017. He made his List A debut for Balkh Province in the 2019 Afghanistan Provincial Challenge Cup tournament on 1 August 2019.
