= Mohammad Zahir (cricketer) =

Afghan cricketer (born 1997)

Personal information
- Born: 20 January 1997 (age 29)
- Source: Cricinfo, 1 November 2017

Mohammad Zahir (born 20 January 1997) is an Afghan cricketer. He made his first-class debut for Band-e-Amir Region in the 2017–18 Ahmad Shah Abdali 4-day Tournament on 1 November 2017. Prior to his first-class debut, he was named in Afghanistan's squad for the 2016 Under-19 Cricket World Cup. He made his List A debut for Logar Province in the 2019 Afghanistan Provincial Challenge Cup tournament on 1 August 2019.
