= Munir Ahmad =

Afghan cricketer

Personal information
- Born: 1 February 1996 (age 30)
- Batting: Right-handed
- Role: Wicket-keeper

International information
- National side: Afghanistan
- Only Test (cap 22): 2 March 2021 v Zimbabwe

Domestic team information
- Years: Team
- 2017–present: Amo Region

Career statistics
Competition	Test	FC	LA	T20
Matches	1	32	39	21
Runs scored	13	2,632	1,531	299
Batting average	6.50	48.74	61.24	24.91
100s/50s	0/0	9/8	5/7	0/1
Top score	12	211	123*	58*
Catches/stumpings	0/–	65/6	40/3	5/0
- Source: Cricinfo, 19 July 2026

Munir Ahmad (Pashto: منیر احمد کاکړ; born 1 February 1996) is an Afghan cricketer. He made his international debut for the Afghanistan cricket team in March 2021.

== Domestic career ==
He made his List A debut for Amo Region in the 2017 Ghazi Amanullah Khan Regional One Day Tournament on 10 August 2017. He made his Twenty20 debut for Boost Defenders in the 2017 Shpageeza Cricket League on 15 September 2017. He made his first-class debut for Boost Region in the 2017–18 Ahmad Shah Abdali 4-day Tournament on 26 October 2017.

He was the leading run-scorer for Boost Region in the 2018 Ahmad Shah Abdali 4-day Tournament, with 843 runs in ten matches. He was also the leading run-scorer for Boost Region in the 2018 Ghazi Amanullah Khan Regional One Day Tournament, with 256 runs in six matches. In the final of the Ghazi Amanullah Khan Regional One Day Tournament, he scored 108 not out, leading Boost Region to a five wicket win, and was named the man of the match.

He was the leading run-scorer in the 2019 Afghanistan Provincial Challenge Cup, with 348 runs in four matches. In September 2019, he was the leading run-scorer in the 2019 Ghazi Amanullah Khan Regional One Day Tournament, with 414 runs in six matches.

== International career ==
In September 2018, he was named in Afghanistan's One Day International (ODI) squad for the 2018 Asia Cup, but he did not play. In November 2019, he was named in Afghanistan's squad for the 2019 ACC Emerging Teams Asia Cup in Bangladesh.

Named in Afghanistan's Test squad for their series against Zimbabwe in February 2021, Munir made his Test debut against Zimbabwe on 2 March 2021.
