= Ghamai Zadran =

Afghan cricketer (born 1996)

Personal information
- Born: 26 September 1996 (age 30); Paktia, Afghanistan
- Batting: Right-handed
- Bowling: Right-arm off break

Domestic team information
- Years: Team
- 2017–present: Mis Ainak Region
- Source: Cricinfo, 10 August 2017

Ghamai Zadran (born 26 September 1996) is an Afghan cricketer. He made his List A debut for Amo Region in the 2017 Ghazi Amanullah Khan Regional One Day Tournament on 10 August 2017. He made his first-class debut for Mis Ainak Region in the 2017–18 Ahmad Shah Abdali 4-day Tournament on 20 October 2017. He made his Twenty20 debut on 8 October 2019, for Amo Sharks in the 2019 Shpageeza Cricket League.
