= Kabul International Cricket Stadium =

Cricket ground in Kabul, Afghanistan

Kabul International Cricket Stadium د کابل الکوزی نړيوال کرکټ لوبغالی
- Kabul Cricket Ground
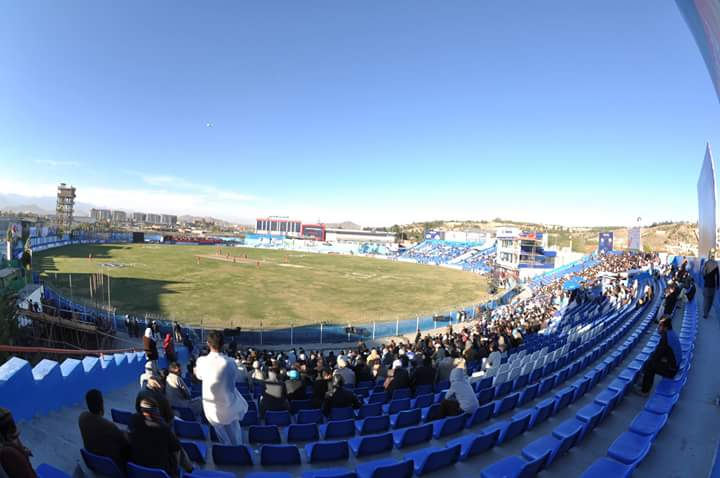
- Crowd watching a cricket tournament in 2015
- Location: Kabul, Afghanistan
- Country: Afghanistan
- Coordinates: 34°30′54″N 69°11′54″E
- Establishment: 2011; 14 years ago
- Capacity: 6,000
- Owner: Afghanistan Cricket Board
- Operator: Afghanistan National Cricket team
- Tenants: Kabul Eagles; Kabul Province cricket team, Afghanistan national cricket team

Kabul International Cricket Stadium (Pashto: د کابل الکوزی نړيوال کرکټ لوبغالی) is a cricket stadium in Kabul, Afghanistan, which opened in 2011 and can accommodate around 6,000 spectators. It is the first international cricket stadium to be constructed in the country and is the home of cricket in Afghanistan.

The Kabul International Cricket Stadium is currently located near the historical Ghazi Stadium. According to the Afghanistan Cricket Board (ACB), construction of another larger cricket stadium is being considered in the Alokhail neighborhood of Kabul.

== History ==
The stadium was inaugurated in 2011 by the ACB, with assistance from USAID and Care International. The ACB has since been using it for local cricket matches and training purposes. Many domestic cricket events are held in the stadium each year, including national tournaments, school cricket tournaments, disability tournaments, and player training camps.

A key development for the stadium over the years was the construction and development of the Afghanistan National Cricket Academy which has recently been funded by the International Cricket Council. The first match was between Nangarhar and AWCC, with Nangarhar winning the tournament.

In May 2015, the Alokozay Group of Companies took sponsorship of Afghanistan national cricket team and the stadium.

In April 2023, renovation efforts began in which the grass of the entire stadium was renewed and replanted to create a better outfield. Along with this, some interior work was done inside the pavilion. This renovation was completed around late 2023.

=== Terrorist attacks ===
On 13 August 2017, a suicide bombing took place near the stadium's entry in which several people were killed and injured.

On 29 July 2022, a grenade explosion occurred within the stadium among a crowd of spectators during a cricket match between the Pamir Zalmi and Band-e-Amir Dragons, killing at least two people and injuring 13 others.

== See also ==
- List of cricket grounds in Afghanistan
