= Kabul Eagles =

Cricket team in Kabul, Afghanistan

GP - Kabul Eagles
- کابل بازان; Kābəl Bāzān

Personnel
- Captain: (Afghanistan) Rahmanullah Gurbaz
- Coach: (Cricket West Indies) Gus Logie
- Owner: Abdul Latif Ayoubi

Team information
- Founded: 2015
- Home ground: Alokozay Kabul International Cricket Ground, Kabul
- Capacity: 6,000

History
- Shpageeza wins: 2 (2016, 2020)

Kabul Eagles (Pashto/Dari: کابل بازان Kābəl Bāzān) is one of eight T20 franchise cricket teams in Afghanistan. The team, based in the country's capital city Kabul, compete in the Afghan Shpageeza Cricket League Twenty20 competition, which they won in 2016 and 2020. The league has List A status since 2017.

== Honours ==
- Shpageeza Cricket League
  - Winners: 2016, 2020
  - Runners-up: 2015–16
