= List of Afghanistan Twenty20 International cricket records =

Twenty20 International (T20I) is a form of cricket played between two of the international members of the International Cricket Council (ICC), in which each team faces a maximum of twenty overs. The matches have top-class status and are the highest T20 standard. The game is played under the rules of Twenty20 cricket. The first Twenty20 International match between two men's sides was played on 17 February 2005, involving Australia and New Zealand. Wisden Cricketers' Almanack reported that "neither side took the game especially seriously", and it was noted by Cricinfo that but for a large score for Ricky Ponting, "the concept would have shuddered". However, Ponting himself said "if it does become an international game then I'm sure the novelty won't be there all the time". This is a list of Afghanistan Cricket team's Twenty20 International records. It is based on the List of Twenty20 International records, but concentrates solely on records dealing with the Afghan cricket team. Afghanistan played its first ever T20I in 2010.

== Key ==
The top five records are listed for each category, except for the team wins, losses, draws and ties, all round records and the partnership records. Tied records for fifth place are also included. Explanations of the general symbols and cricketing terms used in the list are given below. Specific details are provided in each category where appropriate. All records include matches played for Afghanistan only, and are correct as of February 2026.

Key
Symbol	Meaning
†	Player or umpire is currently active in T20I cricket
‡	Even took place during a T20 World Cup
*	Player remained not out or partnership remained unbroken
♠	Twenty20 International cricket record
Date	Starting date of the match
Innings	Number of innings played
Matches	Number of matches played
Opposition	The team Afghanistan was playing against
Period	The time period when the player was active in T20I cricket
Player	The player involved in the record
Venue	Twenty20 International cricket ground where the match was played

== Team records ==
=== Overall record ===
Matches	Won	Lost	Tied	NR	Win %
163	98	61	3	1	60.49
Last updated: 19 February 2026

=== Team wins, losses, draws and ties ===
As of February 2026, Afghanistan has played 163 T20I matches resulting in 98 victories, 61 defeats, 3 ties and 1 no results for an overall winning percentage of 60.49.

Opponent	Matches	Won	Lost	Tied	No Result	% Won
Full Members
Australia	2	1	1	0	0	50.00
Bangladesh	16	7	9	0	0	43.75
England	3	0	3	0	0	0
India	9	0	7	1	1	0
Ireland	26	18	7	1	0	69.23
New Zealand	3	1	2	0	0	33.33
Pakistan	10	4	6	0	0	40.00
South Africa	4	0	3	1	0	0
Sri Lanka	9	3	6	0	0	33.33
West Indies	11	5	6	0	0	45.45
Zimbabwe	21	19	2	0	0	90.47
Associate Members
Canada	3	3	0	0	0	100
Hong Kong	6	4	2	0	0	66.67
Kenya	3	2	1	0	0	66.67
Namibia	1	1	0	0	0	100
Nepal	1	0	1	0	0	0
Netherlands	4	2	2	0	0	50.00
Oman	5	5	0	0	0	100
Papua New Guinea	2	2	0	0	0	100
Qatar	1	1	0	0	0	100
Scotland	7	7	0	0	0	100
United Arab Emirates	14	11	3	0	0	78.57
Uganda	1	1	0	0	0	100
Total	163	98	61	3	1	60.49
Statistics are correct as of 19 February 2026.

=== First bilateral T20I series wins ===
Opponent	Year of first Home win	Year of first Away win
Bangladesh	2018	—
Hong Kong	—	YTP
India	YTP	—
Ireland	2017	2018
Kenya	–	YTP
Oman	2015	YTP
Pakistan	2023	—
Scotland	2013	YTP
Sri Lanka	YTP	—
United Arab Emirates	YTP	2016
West Indies	2019	—
Zimbabwe	2016	2015
Last Updated: 19 February 2026

=== First T20I match wins ===
Opponent	Home		Away / Neutral	
Opponent	Venue	Year	Venue	Year
Australia	YTP		Arnos Vale Stadium, Kingstown, Saint Vincent and Grenadines	2024
Bangladesh	Rajiv Gandhi International Cricket Stadium, Dehradun, India	2018	Sher-e-Bangla National Cricket Stadium, Mirpur, Bangladesh	2019
Canada	ICC Global Cricket Academy, Dubai, UAE	2012	Sinhalese Sports Club Ground, Colombo, Sri Lanka	2010
England	YTP		—	
Hong Kong	YTP		Zohur Ahmed Chowdhury Stadium, Chittagong, Bangladesh	2014
India	YTP		—	
Ireland	Sheikh Zayed Cricket Stadium, Abu Dhabi, UAE	2017	Dubai International Cricket Stadium, Dubai, UAE	2010
Kenya	Sharjah Cricket Association Stadium, Sharjah, UAE	2013	YTP	YTP
Namibia	YTP		Sheikh Zayed Cricket Stadium, Abu Dhabi, UAE	2021
Nepal	YTP		—	
Netherlands	Dubai International Cricket Stadium, Dubai, UAE	2012	The Grange, Edinburgh, Scotland	2015
New Zealand	YTP		Providence Stadium, Providence, Guyana	2024
Oman	Sheikh Zayed Cricket Stadium, Abu Dhabi, UAE	2015	Clontarf Cricket Club Ground, Dublin, Ireland	2015
Pakistan	Sharjah Cricket Stadium, Sharjah, UAE	2023	-	
Papua New Guinea	YTP		Malahide Cricket Club Ground, Dublin, Ireland	2015
Qatar	YTP		West End Park International Cricket Stadium, Doha, Qatar	2025
Scotland	Sharjah Cricket Association Stadium, Sharjah, UAE	2013	Sheikh Zayed Cricket Stadium, Abu Dhabi, UAE	2010
South Africa	YTP		—	
Sri Lanka	Dubai International Stadium, UAE	2022	Rangiri Dambulla International Stadium, Danbulla, Sri Lanka	2024
Uganda	YTP		Providence Stadium, Providence, Guyana	2024
United Arab Emirates	YTP		The Grange, Edinburgh, Scotland	2015
West Indies	Bharat Ratna Shri Atal Bihari Vajpayee Ekana Cricket Stadium, Lucknow, India	2019	Vidarbha Cricket Association Stadium, Nagpur, India	2016
Zimbabwe	Sharjah Cricket Association Stadium, Sharjah, UAE	2016	Queens Sports Club, Bulawayo, Zimbabwe	2015
Last Updated: 19 February 2026

=== Team scoring records ===
==== Most runs in an innings ====
The highest innings total scored in T20Is has been scored twice. The first occasion came in the match between Afghanistan and Ireland when Afghanistan scored 278/3 in the 2nd T20I of the Ireland series in India in February 2019. The Czech Republic national cricket team against Turkey during the 2019 Continental Cup scored 278/4 to equal the record.

Rank	Score	Opposition	Venue	Date
1	278/3	Ireland	Rajiv Gandhi International Cricket Stadium, Dehradun, India	23 February 2019
2	233/8	Ireland	Greater Noida Sports Complex Ground, Greater Noida, India	10 March 2017
3	215/6	Zimbabwe	Sharjah Cricket Association Stadium, Sharjah, UAE	10 January 2016
4	212/6	India	M Chinnaswamy Stadium, Bengaluru, India	17 January 2024
5	210/5	Scotland	The Grange, Edinburgh, Scotland	12 July 2015
Last Updated: 19 February 2026

==== Fewest runs in an innings ====
The lowest innings total scored was by Turkey against Czech Republic when they were dismissed for 21 during the 2019 Continental Cup. The lowest score in T20I history for Afghanistan is 56 scored against South Africa in the 2024 ICC Men's T20 World Cup semi-final.

Rank	Score	Opposition	Venue	Date
1	56/10	South Africa	Brian Lara Cricket Academy, San Fernando, Trinidad and Tobago	26 June 2024 ‡
2	66/10	Pakistan	Sharjah Cricket Association Stadium, Sharjah, UAE	7 September 2025
3	72/10	Bangladesh	Sher-e-Bangla National Cricket Stadium, Mirpur, Bangladesh	16 March 2014 ‡
4	80/10	South Africa	Kensington Oval, Bridgetown, Barbados	5 May 2010 ‡
4	80/10	England	Ranasinghe Premadasa Stadium, Colombo, Sri Lanka	21 September 2012 ‡
Last Updated: 19 February 2026

==== Most runs conceded an innings ====
The final of the 2013 ICC World Twenty20 Qualifier against the Ireland saw Afghanistan concede their highest innings total of 225/7.

Rank	Score	Opposition	Venue	Date
1	225/7	Ireland	Sheikh Zayed Cricket Stadium, Abu Dhabi, UAE	30 November 2013
2	218/5	West Indies	Daren Sammy Cricket Ground, Gros Islet, Saint Lucia	17 June 2024 ‡
3	212/2	India	Dubai International Cricket Stadium, Dubai, UAE	8 September 2022 ‡
4	212/4	India	M Chinnaswamy Stadium, Bengaluru, India	17 January 2024
5	210/2	India	Sheikh Zayed Cricket Stadium, Abu Dhabi, UAE	3 November 2021 ‡
Last Updated: 19 February 2026

==== Fewest runs conceded in an innings ====
The lowest score conceded by Afghanistan for a full inning is 56 when they dismissed Kenya during the Kenya v Afghanistan series in the UAE in September 2013 at Sharjah.

Rank	Score	Opposition	Venue	Date
1	56/10	Kenya	Sharjah Cricket Stadium, Sharjah, UAE	30 September 2013
2	58/10	Uganda	Providence Stadium, Providence, Guyana	4 June 2024
3	60/10	Scotland	Sharjah Cricket Stadium, Sharjah, UAE	25 October 2021 ‡
4	71/10	Ireland	Dubai International Cricket Stadium, Dubai, UAE	20 January 2017
5	75/10	New Zealand	Providence Stadium, Providence, Guyana	8 June 2024
Last Updated: 19 February 2026

==== Most runs aggregate in a match ====
The highest match aggregate scored in T20Is came in the match between India and West Indies in the first T20I of the August 2016 series at Central Broward Regional Park, Lauderhill when India scored 244/4 in response to West Indies score of 245/6 to lose the match by 1 run. The 2nd T20I of the Ireland v Afghanistan series in India in February 2019 in Rajiv Gandhi International Cricket Stadium, Dehradun, India saw a total of 472 runs being scored.

Rank	Aggregate	Scores	Venue	Date
1	472/9	Afghanistan (278/3) v Ireland (194/6)	Rajiv Gandhi International Cricket Stadium, Dehradun, India	23 February 2019
2	438/18	Afghanistan (233/8) v Ireland (205)	Greater Noida Sports Complex Ground, Greater Noida, India	12 March 2017
3	424/10	India (212/4) v Afghanistan (212/6)	M Chinnaswamy Stadium, Bengaluru, India	17 January 2024
4	415/11	Afghanistan (209/5) v Sri Lanka (206/6)	Rangiri Dambulla International Stadium, Dambulla, Sri Lanka	21 February 2024
5	388/15	Afghanistan (210/7) v Ireland (178/8)	Rajiv Gandhi International Cricket Stadium, Dehradun, India	24 February 2019
Last Updated: 21 February 2024

==== Fewest runs aggregate in a match ====
The lowest match aggregate in T20Is is 57 when Turkey were dismissed for 28 by Luxembourg in the second T20I of the 2019 Continental Cup in Romania in August 2019. The lowest match aggregate in T20I history for Afghanistan is 146 scored during the final of the 2017 Desert T20 Challenge against Ireland when Afghanistan dismissed Ireland for 71 to win by 10 wickets.

Rank	Aggregate	Scores	Venue	Date
1	146/10	Ireland (71) v Afghanistan (75/0)	Dubai International Cricket Stadium, Dubai, UAE	20 January 2017
2	150/11	Afghanistan (72) v Bangladesh (78/1)	Sher-e-Bangla National Cricket Stadium, Mirpur, Bangladesh	16 March 2014 ‡
3	151/8	Ireland (95/5) v Afghanistan (56/3)	Civil Service Cricket Club, Belfast, Northern Ireland	17 August 2022
4	182/13	Afghanistan (90) v Netherlands (92/3)	Sharjah Cricket Association Stadium, Sharjah, UAE	15 November 2013
5	190/13	Pakistan (92/9) v Afghanistan (98/4)	Sharjah Cricket Stadium, Sharjah, UAE	24 March 2023
Last Updated: 8 September 2022

=== Result records ===
A T20I match is won when one side has scored more runs than the runs scored by the opposing side during their innings. If both sides have completed both their allocated innings and the side that fielded last has the higher aggregate of runs, it is known as a win by runs. This indicates the number of runs that they had scored more than the opposing side. If the side batting last wins the match, it is known as a win by wickets, indicating the number of wickets that were still to fall.

==== Greatest win margins (by runs) ====
The greatest winning margin by runs in T20Is was Czech Republic's victory over Turkey by 257 runs in the sixth match of the 2019 Continental Cup. The largest victory recorded by Afghanistan was during the Kenya v Afghanistan series in the UAE in September 2013 by 106 runs.

Rank	Margin	Opposition	Venue	Date
1	130 Runs	Scotland	Sharjah Cricket Association Stadium, Sharjah, UAE	25 October 2021 ‡
2	125 Runs	Uganda	Providence Stadium, Providence, Guyana	4 June 2024 ‡
3	106 Runs	Kenya	Sharjah Cricket Association Stadium, Sharjah, UAE	30 September 2013
4	84 Runs	Ireland	Rajiv Gandhi International Cricket Stadium, Dehradun, India	23 February 2019
4	84 Runs	New Zealand	Providence Stadium, Providence, Guyana	8 June 2024 ‡
Last Updated: 7 November 2021

==== Greatest win margins (by balls remaining) ====
The greatest winning margin by balls remaining in T20Is was Austria's victory over Turkey by 104 balls remaining in the ninth match of the 2019 Continental Cup. The largest victory recorded by Afghanistan is during the final of the 2017 Desert T20 Challenge against Ireland when they won by 10 wickets with 73 balls remaining.

Rank	Balls remaining	Margin	Opposition	Venue	Date
1	73	10 wickets	Ireland	Dubai International Cricket Stadium, Dubai, UAE	20 January 2017
2	59	8 wickets	Sri Lanka	Dubai International Cricket Stadium, Dubai, UAE	27 August 2022
3	32	5 wickets	Zimbabwe	Sharjah Cricket Association Stadium, Sharjah, UAE	5 February 2018
4	16	8 wickets	United Arab Emirates	The Grange, Edinburgh, Scotland	10 July 2015
5	15	8 wickets	Ireland	Dubai International Cricket Stadium, Dubai, UAE	13 February 2010
5	15	7 wickets	Scotland	Sharjah Cricket Association Stadium, Sharjah, UAE	4 March 2013
Last Updated: 27 August 2022

==== Greatest win margins (by wickets) ====
A total of 22 matches have ended with chasing team winning by 10 wickets with New Zealand winning by such margins a record three times. Afghanistan have won a T20I match by this margin on one occasion.

Rank	Margin	Opposition	Venue	Date
1	10 wickets	Ireland	Dubai International Cricket Stadium, Dubai, UAE	20 January 2017
2	8 wickets	Ireland	Dubai International Cricket Stadium, Dubai, UAE	13 February 2010
2	8 wickets	United Arab Emirates	The Grange, Edinburgh, Scotland	10 July 2015
2	8 wickets	Oman	Dubai International Cricket Stadium, Dubai, UAE	20 January 2017
2	8 wickets	Bangladesh	Shere Bangla National Stadium, Dhaka, Bangladesh	5 March 2022
2	8 wickets	Sri Lanka	Dubai International Cricket Stadium, Dubai, UAE	27 August 2022
5	7 wickets	Scotland	Sharjah Cricket Association Stadium, Sharjah, UAE	4 March 2013
5	7 wickets	Hong Kong	Zohur Ahmed Chowdhury Stadium, Chittagong, Bangladesh	18 March 2014 ‡
5	7 wickets	Bangladesh	Sharjah Cricket Association Stadium, Sharjah, UAE	30 August 2022
5	7 wickets	Pakistan	Sharjah Cricket Association Stadium, Sharjah, UAE	26 March 2023
Last updated: 8 September 2022

==== Highest successful run chases ====
Australia holds the record for the highest successful run chase which they achieved when they scored 245/5/9 in response to New Zealand's 243/6. Afghanistan's highest innings total while chasing is 191/5 in a successful run chase against Zimbabwe at Bulawayo, Zimbabwe during the Afghanistan's tour of Zimbabwe in 2015.

Rank	Score	Target	Opposition	Venue	Date
1	191/5	191	Zimbabwe	Queens Sports Club, Bulawayo, Zimbabwe	28 October 2015
2	183/5	180	United Arab Emirates	Dubai International Cricket Stadium, Dubai, UAE	16 December 2016
3	171/4	166	Ireland	Greater Noida Sports Complex Ground, Greater Noida, India	8 March 2017
4	168/2	165	United Arab Emirates	The Grange, Edinburgh, Scotland	10 July 2015
4	168/7	166	Oman	Fatullah Osmani Stadium, Fatullah, Bangladesh	20 February 2016
Last Updated: 9 August 2020

==== Narrowest win margins (by runs) ====
The narrowest run margin victory is by 1 run which has been achieved in 15 T20I's with Afghanistan winning such games once.

Rank	Margin	Opposition	Venue	Date
1	1 Run	Bangladesh	Rajiv Gandhi International Cricket Stadium, Dehradun, India	7 June 2018
2	3 Runs	Sri Lanka	Rangiri Dambulla International Stadium, Dambulla, Sri Lanka	21 February 2024
3	4 Runs	United Arab Emirates	Sharjah Cricket Association Stadium, Sharjah, UAE	5 September 2025
4	5 Runs	Zimbabwe	Sharjah Cricket Association Stadium, Sharjah, UAE	8 January 2016
5	6 Runs	West Indies	Vidarbha Cricket Association Stadium, Nagpur, India	27 March 2016 ‡
Last Updated: 9 September 2025

==== Narrowest win margins (by balls remaining) ====
The narrowest winning margin by balls remaining in T20Is is by winning of the last ball which has been achieved 26 times. Afghanistan has yet to achieve victory of the last ball.

Rank	Balls remaining	Margin	Opposition	Venue	Date
1	1	5 wickets	Canada	Sinhalese Sports Club Ground, Colombo, Sri Lanka	4 February 2010
1	1	5 wickets	Zimbabwe	Queens Sports Club, Bulawayo, Zimbabwe	28 October 2015
1	1	7 wickets	Pakistan	Sharjah Cricket Stadium, Sharjah, UAE	26 March 2023
4	2	4 wickets	Netherlands	Dubai International Cricket Stadium, Dubai, UAE	14 March 2012
4	2	5 wickets	United Arab Emirates	Dubai International Cricket Stadium, Dubai, UAE	16 December 2016
6	3	3 wickets	Oman	Fatullah Osmani Stadium, Fatullah, Bangladesh	20 February 2016
Last Updated: 26 March 2023

==== Narrowest win margins (by wickets) ====
The narrowest margin of victory by wickets is 1 wicket which has settled four such T20Is. The narrowest victory by wickets for Afghanistan is three wickets.

Rank	Margin	Opposition	Venue	Date
1	3 wickets	Oman	Fatullah Osmani Stadium, Fatullah, Bangladesh	20 February 2016
2	4 wickets	Netherlands	Dubai International Cricket Stadium, Dubai, UAE	14 March 2012
3	5 wickets	Canada	Sinhalese Sports Club Ground, Colombo, Sri Lanka	4 February 2010
3	5 wickets	Oman	Clontarf Cricket Club Ground, Dublin, Ireland	25 July 2015
3	5 wickets	Zimbabwe	Queens Sports Club, Bulawayo, Zimbabwe	28 October 2015
3	5 wickets	United Arab Emirates	Dubai International Cricket Stadium, Dubai, UAE	16 December 2016
3	5 wickets	Ireland	Sheikh Zayed Cricket Stadium, Abu Dhabi, UAE	14 January 2017
3	5 wickets	United Arab Emirates	Sheikh Zayed Cricket Stadium, Abu Dhabi, UAE	16 January 2017
3	5 wickets	Zimbabwe	Sharjah Cricket Association Stadium, Sharjah, UAE	5 February 2018
3	5 wickets	Ireland	Rajiv Gandhi International Cricket Stadium, Dehradun, India	21 February 2019
Last Updated: 9 August 2020

==== Greatest loss margins (by runs) ====
Afghanistan's biggest defeat by runs was against England in the 2012 ICC World Twenty20 at Ranasinghe Premadasa Stadium, Colombo, Sri Lanka.

Rank	Margin	Opposition	Venue	Date
1	127 runs	India	Arun Jaitley Cricket Stadium, New Delhi, India	17 September 2026
2	116 runs	England	Ranasinghe Premadasa Stadium, Colombo, Sri Lanka	21 September 2012 ‡
3	101 runs	India	Dubai International Cricket Stadium, Dubai, UAE	8 September 2022 ‡
4	75 runs	Pakistan	Sharjah Cricket Stadium, Sharjah, UAE	7 September 2025
5	72 runs	Sri Lanka	Rangiri Dambulla International Stadium, Dambulla, Sri Lanka	19 February 2024
Last Updated: 17 September 2026

==== Greatest loss margins (by balls remaining) ====
The largest defeat suffered by Afghanistan was against Bangladesh in Bangladesh during the 2014 ICC World Twenty20 when they lost by 9 wickets with 48 balls remaining.

Rank	Balls remaining	Margin	Opposition	Venue	Date
1	48	9 wickets	Bangladesh	Sher-e-Bangla National Cricket Stadium, Mirpur, Bangladesh	16 March 2014 ‡
2	43	7 wickets	Netherlands	Sharjah Cricket Association Stadium, Sharjah, UAE	15 November 2013
3	31	7 wickets	India	Darren Sammy National Cricket Stadium, Gros Islet, Saint Lucia	1 May 2010 ‡
3	26	6 wickets	India	Holkar Stadium, Indore, India	14 January 2024
5	21	6 wickets	West Indies	Warner Park, Basseterre, Saint Kitts and Nevis	2 June 2017
Last Updated: 14 January 2024

==== Greatest loss margins (by wickets) ====
Afghanistan have lost a T20I match by a margin of 9 wickets on two occasions.

Rank	Margins	Opposition	Most recent venue	Date
1	9 wickets	Bangladesh	Sher-e-Bangla National Cricket Stadium, Mirpur, Bangladesh	16 March 2014 ‡
1	9 wickets	United Arab Emirates	Sheikh Zayed Cricket Stadium, Abu Dhabi, UAE	18 February 2023
2	8 wickets	New Zealand	Sheikh Zayed Cricket Stadium, Abu Dhabi, UAE	7 November 2021 ‡
3	7 wickets	India	Darren Sammy National Cricket Stadium, Gros Islet, Saint Lucia	1 May 2010 ‡
3	7 wickets	Netherlands	Sharjah Cricket Association Stadium, Sharjah, UAE	15 November 2013
3	7 wickets	West Indies	Warner Park, Basseterre, Saint Kitts and Nevis	5 June 2017
3	7 wickets	Zimbabwe	Zohur Ahmed Chowdhury Stadium, Chittagong, Bangladesh	20 September 2019
3	7 wickets	Ireland	Civil Service Cricket Club, Belfast, Northern Ireland	9 August 2022
3	7 wickets	Ireland	Civil Service Cricket Club, Belfast, Northern Ireland	17 August 2022
Last Updated: 18 February 2023

==== Narrowest loss margins (by runs) ====
The narrowest loss of Afghanistan in terms of runs is by 9 runs suffered against Nepal during the 2014 ICC World Twenty20.

Rank	Margin	Opposition	Venue	Date
1	9 runs	Nepal	Zohur Ahmed Chowdhury Stadium, Chittagong, Bangladesh	20 March 2014 ‡
2	15 runs	England	Arun Jaitley Stadium, Delhi, India	23 March 2016 ‡
3	16 runs	United Arab Emirates	Fatullah Osmani Stadium, Fatullah, Bangladesh	19 February 2016
4	23 runs	India	Ranasinghe Premadasa Stadium, Colombo, Sri Lanka	19 September 2012 ‡
5	29 runs	West Indies	Warner Park, Basseterre, Saint Kitts and Nevis	3 June 2017
Last Updated: 9 August 2020

==== Narrowest loss margins (by balls remaining) ====
Afghanistan has suffered loss by this margin once.

Rank	Balls remaining	Margin	Opposition	Venue	Date
1	0	5 wickets	Hong Kong	Malahide Cricket Club Ground, Dublin, Ireland	21 July 2015
2	1	6 wickets	Pakistan	Sharjah Cricket Association Stadium, Sharjah, UAE	8 December 2013
2	1	7 wickets	Ireland	Civil Service Cricket Club, Belfast, Northern Ireland	9 August 2022
3	2	4 wickets	Hong Kong	Sheikh Zayed Cricket Stadium, Abu Dhabi, UAE	28 November 2015
5	2	7 wickets	Ireland	Civil Service Cricket Club, Belfast, Northern Ireland	17 August 2022
Last Updated: 8 September 2022

==== Narrowest loss margins (by wickets) ====
Afghanistan has suffered defeat by 4 wickets on three occasions.

Rank	Margin	Opposition	Venue	Date
1	1 wicket	Pakistan	Sharjah Cricket Association Stadium, Sharjah, UAE	7 September 2022
2	4 wickets	Netherlands	Dubai International Cricket Stadium, Dubai, UAE	12 February 2010
2	4 wickets	Hong Kong	Sheikh Zayed Cricket Stadium, Abu Dhabi, UAE	28 November 2015
2	4 wickets	Bangladesh	Zohur Ahmed Chowdhury Stadium, Chittagong, Bangladesh	21 September 2019
2	4 wickets	Sri Lanka	Sharjah Cricket Association Stadium, Sharjah, UAE	3 September 2022
3	5 wickets	Ireland	Paikiasothy Saravanamuttu Stadium, Colombo, Sri Lanka	1 February 2010
3	5 wickets	Ireland	Dubai International Cricket Stadium, Dubai, UAE	24 March 2012
3	5 wickets	Hong Kong	Malahide Cricket Club Ground, Dublin, Ireland	21 July 2015
3	5 wickets	Pakistan	Dubai International Cricket Stadium, Dubai, UAE	29 October 2021 ‡
Last Updated: 8 September 2022

==== Tied matches ====
A tie can occur when the scores of both teams are equal at the conclusion of play, provided that the side batting last has completed their innings. Afghanistan have been involved in 2 ties.

Opposition	Venue	Date
Ireland	Greater Noida Sports Complex Ground, Greater Noida, India	10 March 2020
India	M Chinnaswamy Stadium, Bengaluru, India	17 January 2024
Last updated: 17 January 2024

== Batting records ==
=== Most career runs ===
A run is the basic means of scoring in cricket. A run is scored when the batsman hits the ball with his bat and with his partner runs the length of 22 yards (20 m) of the pitch. Mohammad Nabi is the leading Afghan batsmen on this list with 2,430 Runs.

Rank	Runs	Player	Matches	Innings	Average	100	50	Period
1	2,430	Mohammad Nabi†	148	137	22.29	0	7	2010–2025
2	2,139	Rahmanullah Gurbaz†	83	83	25.77	1	11	2019–2025
3	2,048	Mohammad Shahzad	73	73	29.25	1	12	2010–2023
4	1,830	Najibullah Zadran†	107	95	29.51	0	8	2012–2024
5	1,695	Ibrahim Zadran†	61	61	31.98	0	13	2019–2025
6	1,382	Asghar Afghan	75	68	21.93			
7	1,160	Hazratullah Zazai	45	45	27.61			
8	1,013	Samiullah Shinwari	65	56	22.02			
9	993	Gulbadin Naib†	81	68	20.68			
10	786	Usman Ghani	35	34	25.35			
Last Updated: 02 February 2026

=== Fastest runs getter ===
Runs	Batsman	Innings	Record Date	Reference
1,000	Hazratullah Zazai	37	14 July 2023	
2,000	Mohammad Shahzad	68	31 October 2021	

==== Most runs in each batting position ====
Batting position	Batsman	Innings	Runs	Average	Career Span	Ref
Number 1	Mohammad Shahzad	50	1,417	29.52	2012–2018	
Number 2	Ibrahim Zadran†	23	793	39.65	2023-2026	
Number 3	Asghar Afghan	39	833	23.13	2013–2021	
Number 4	Najibullah Zadran†	19	434	28.93	2013–2023	
Number 5	Mohammad Nabi†	54	898	21.38	2012–2025	
Number 6	Mohammad Nabi†	43	708	19.66	2010–2025	
Number 7	Mohammad Nabi†	20	443	29.53	2010–2025	
Number 8	Rashid Khan†	39	360	15.00	2016–2025	
Number 9	Rashid Khan†	12	77	12.83	2016–2025	
Number 10	Naveen-ul-Haq†	11	33	3.66	2019–2014	
Number 11	Azmatullah Omarzai†	1	21	21.00	2023–2023	
Last Updated: 8 November 2025

==== Most runs against each team ====
Opposition	Runs	Player	Matches	Innings	Span	Ref
Australia	90	Rahmanullah Gurbaz†	2	2	2022–2024	
Bangladesh	294	Mohammad Nabi†	16	15	2014–2025	
Canada	78	Karim Sadiq	2	2	2010–2012	
England	44	Gulbadin Naib†	2	2	2012–2016	
Hong Kong	157	Mohammad Shahzad	5	5	2014–2016	
India	179	Gulbadin Naib†	7	6	2012–2024	
Ireland	514	Mohammad Nabi†	26	23	2010–2024	
Kenya	59	Asghar Afghan	2	2	2013–2013	
Namibia	45	Mohammad Shahzad	1	1	2021–2021	
Nepal	49	Asghar Afghan	1	1	2014–2014	
Netherlands	87	Mohammad Shahzad	4	4	2010–2015	
New Zealand	86	Rahmanullah Gurbaz†	2	2	2021–2024	
Oman	148	Mohammad Shahzad	5	5	2017–2017	
Pakistan	168	Ibrahim Zadran†	7	7	2023–2025	
Papua New Guinea	65	Nawroz Mangal	1	1	2015–2015	
Scotland	331	Mohammad Shahzad	7	7	2010–2021	
South Africa	46	Mohammad Shahzad	2	2	2010–2016	
Sri Lanka	262	Rahmanullah Gurbaz†	7	7	2022–2025	
Uganda	76	Rahmanullah Gurbaz†	1	1	2024–2024	
United Arab Emirates	266	Ibrahim Zadran†	8	8	2023–2025	
West Indies	134	Najibullah Zadran†	8	8	2016–2024	
Zimbabwe	486	Mohammad Nabi†	21	20	2015–2025	
Last updated: 8 November 2025

==== Highest individual score ====
The third T20I of the 2018 Zimbabwe Tri-Nation Series saw Aaron Finch score the highest Individual score. Hazratullah Zazai holds the Afghan record when he scored 162* against Ireland in the first T20I of the 2019 series.

Rank	Runs	Player	Opposition	Venue	Date
1	162*	Hazratullah Zazai †	Ireland	Rajiv Gandhi International Cricket Stadium, Dehradun, India	23 February 2019
2	118*	Mohammad Shahzad	Zimbabwe	Sharjah Cricket Association Stadium, Sharjah, UAE	10 January 2016
3	100	Rahmanullah Gurbaz †	United Arab Emirates		29 December 2023
4	90	Najeeb Tarakai	Ireland	Greater Noida Sports Complex Ground, Greater Noida, India	10 March 2017
5	89	Mohammad Nabi †	Ireland	Greater Noida Sports Complex Ground, Greater Noida, India	12 March 2017
Last Updated: 21 February 2024

==== Highest individual score – progression of record ====
Runs	Player	Opponent	Venue	Season
33*	Raees Ahmadzai	Ireland	Paikiasothy Saravanamuttu Stadium, Colombo, Sri Lanka	1 February 2010
42	Karim Sadiq	Canada	Sinhalese Sports Club Ground, Colombo, Sri Lanka	4 February 2010
43*	Mohammad Nabi †	Ireland	Dubai International Cricket Stadium, Dubai, UAE	9 February 2010
65*	Mohammad Shahzad	Ireland	Dubai International Cricket Stadium, Dubai, UAE	13 February 2010
77	Mohammad Shahzad	Ireland	Dubai International Cricket Stadium, Dubai, UAE	24 March 2012
118*	Mohammad Shahzad	Zimbabwe	Sharjah Cricket Association Stadium, Sharjah, UAE	10 January 2016
162*	Hazratullah Zazai †	Ireland	Rajiv Gandhi International Cricket Stadium, Dehradun, India	23 February 2019
Last Updated: 18 March 2021

==== Highest score against each opponent ====
Opposition	Player	Score	Date
Australia	Rashid Khan	48*	4 November 2022
Bangladesh	Mohammad Nabi	84*	15 September 2019
Canada	Samiullah Shinwari	61	18 March 2012
England	Gulbadin Naib	44	21 September 2012 ‡
Hong Kong	Mohammad Shahzad	68	18 March 2014 ‡
India	Ibrahim Zadran	64*	8 September 2022 ‡
Ireland	Hazratullah Zazai	162*	23 February 2019
Kenya	Noor Ali Zadran	50	24 November 2013
Namibia	Mohammad Shahzad	45	31 October 2021 ‡
Nepal	Asghar Afghan	49	20 March 2014
Netherlands	Mohammad Shahzad	54	14 March 2012
New Zealand	Najibullah Zadran	73	7 November 2021 ‡
Oman	Mohammad Shahzad	80	20 January 2017
Pakistan	Ibrahim Zadran	65	2 September 2025
Papua New Guinea	Nawroz Mangal	65*	23 July 2015
Scotland	Mohammad Shahzad	75	12 July 2015
South Africa	Mohammad Shahzad	44	20 March 2016
Sri Lanka	Rahmanullah Gurbaz	84	3 September 2022
United Arab Emirates	Rahmanullah Gurbaz †	100	29 December 2023
West Indies	Rahmanullah Gurbaz	79	17 November 2019
Zimbabwe	Mohammad Shahzad	118*	10 January 2016
Last Updated: 9 September 2025

==== Highest career average ====
A batsman's batting average is the total number of runs they have scored divided by the number of times they have been dismissed.

Rank	Average	Player	Innings	Runs	Not out	Period
1	29.54	Ibrahim Zadran†	33	1,300	6	2019–2025
2	29.51	Najibullah Zadran†	95	1,830	33	2012–2024
3	29.25	Mohammad Shahzad	73	2,048	3	2010–2023
4	27.61	Hazratullah Zazai†	45	1,160	3	2016–2024
5	27.13	Noor Ali Zadran	23	597	1	2010–2017
Qualification: 20 innings. Last Updated: 9 September 2025

==== Highest average in each batting position ====
Batting position	Batsman	Innings	Runs	Average	Career Span	Ref
Opener	Ibrahim Zadran†	16	509	36.35	2023–2025	
Number 3	Gulbadin Naib†	10	270	38.57	2014–2014	
Number 4	Samiullah Shinwari	15	297	29.70	2013-2018	
Number 5	Samiullah Shinwari	10	273	30.33	2012–2020	
Number 6	Najibullah Zadran†	26	487	34.78	2014–2024	
Number 7	Najibullah Zadran†	13	269	44.83	2013–2024	
Number 8	Rashid Khan†	34	293	13.95	2016–2025	
Number 9	Rashid Khan†	11	73	14.60	2016–2024	
Number 10	Naveen-ul-Haq†	11	33	3.66	2019–2024	
Number 11	Fazalhaq Farooqi†	13	14	4.66	2021–2025	
Last Updated: 9 September 2025. Qualification: Batted 10 innings

==== Most half-centuries ====
A half-century is a score of between 50 and 99 runs. Statistically, once a batsman's score reaches 100, it is no longer considered a half-century but a century.

Virat Kohli of India has scored the most half-centuries in T20Is with 24. He is followed by India's Rohit Sharma on 21, Ireland's Paul Stirling on 18 and Australia's David Warner on 17. Mohammad Shahzad is the Afghani batsmen with most half-centuries, 12.

Rank	Half centuries	Player	Innings	Runs	Period
1	13	Ibrahim Zadran†	58	1,558	2019–2025
2	12	Mohammad Shahzad	73	2,048	2010–2023
3	11	Rahmanullah Gurbaz†	80	2,067	2019–2025
4	8	Najibullah Zadran†	95	1,830	2012–2024
5	7	Mohammad Nabi†	135	2,417	2010–2025
Last Updated: 8 November 2025

==== Most centuries ====
A century is a score of 100 or more runs in a single innings.

Mohammad Shahzad, Hazratullah Zazai and Rahmanullah Gurbaz are the Afghani centurions with one century each.

Rank	Centuries	Player	Innings	Runs	Period
1	1	Hazratullah Zazai†	35	968	2016–2023
1	1	Mohammad Shahzad	70	2,015	2010–2021
1	1	Rahmanullah Gurbaz †	52	1,367	2019-2024
Last Updated: 21 February 2024

==== Most Sixes ====
Rank	Sixes	Player	Innings	Runs	Period
1	103	Mohammad Nabi†	110	2,019	2010–2024
2	95	Najibullah Zadran†	91	1,808	2012–2024
3	79	Rahmanullah Gurbaz†	52	1,367	2019–2024
4	76	Mohammad Shahzad	73	2,048	2010–2023
5	69	Asghar Afghan	68	1,382	2010–2021
Last Updated: 21 February 2024

==== Most Fours ====
Rank	Fours	Player	Innings	Runs	Period
1	229	Mohammad Shahzad	73	2,048	2010–2023
2	138	Mohammad Nabi†	110	2,019	2010–2024
3	126	Najibullah Zadran†	91	1,808	2012–2024
4	108	Hazratullah Zazai†	43	1,138	2016–2024
5	107	Rahmanullah Gurbaz†	52	1,367	2019–2024
Last Updated: 21 February 2023

==== Highest strike rates ====
Ravija Sandaruwan of Kuwait holds the record for highest strike rate, with minimum 250 balls faced qualification, with 165.80. Hazratullah Zazai is the Afghan with the highest strike rate.

Rank	Strike rate	Player	Runs	Balls Faced	Period
1	145.29	Shafiqullah	494	340	2010–2019
2	138.95	Mohammad Nabi†	2,019	1,453	2010–2024
3	138.92	Rahmanullah Gurbaz†	1,367	984	2019–2024
4	138.54	Najibullah Zadran†	1,808	1,305	2012–2024
5	133.09	Hazratullah Zazai†	1,138	855	2016–2023
Qualification= 250 balls faced. Last Updated: 21 February 2023

==== Highest strike rates in an innings ====
Dwayne Smith of West Indies strike rate of 414.28 during his 29 off 7 balls against Bangladesh during 2007 ICC World Twenty20 is the world record for highest strike rate in an innings. Najibullah Zadran holds the top two positions for an Afghanistan player in this list.

Rank	Strike rate	Player	Runs	Balls Faced	Opposition	Venue	Date
1	310.00	Najibullah Zadran †	31*	10	United Arab Emirates	ICC Global Cricket Academy, Dubai, UAE	14 December 2016
2	310.00	Rashid Khan†	31*	10	Ireland	Stormont ground, Belfast, Northern Ireland	15 August 2022
3	296.67	Mohammad Nabi †	89	30	Ireland	Greater Noida Sports Complex Ground, Greater Noida, India	12 March 2017
4	278.57	Samiullah Shinwari	39*	14	Kenya	Sharjah Cricket Association Stadium, Sharjah, UAE	30 September 2013
5	266.66	Mohammad Nabi †	40	15	Zimbabwe	Sheikh Zayed Cricket Stadium, Abu Dhabi, UAE	19 March 2021
Last Updated: 7 September 2022

==== Most runs in a calendar year ====
Paul Stirling of Ireland holds the record for most runs scored in a calendar year with 748 runs scored in 2019. Mohommad Shhazad scored 520 runs in 2016, the most for an Afghanistan batsmen in a year.

Rank	Runs	Player	Matches	Innings	Year
1	520	Mohammad Shahzad	15	15	2016
2	510	Ibrahim Zadran†	17	17	2024
3	493	Rahmanullah Gurbaz†	17	17	2024
4	367	Ibrahim Zadran	13	13	2022
5	365	Rahmanullah Gurbaz	17	17	2022
Last Updated: 26 June 2024

==== Most runs in a series ====
The 2014 ICC World Twenty20 in Bangladesh saw Virat Kohli set the record for the most runs scored in a single series scoring 319 runs. He is followed by Tillakaratne Dilshan with 317 runs scored in the 2009 ICC World Twenty20. Mohammad Shahzad has scored the most runs in a series for an Afghanistan batsmen, when he scored 222 runs in the 2016 ICC World Twenty20.

Rank	Runs	Player	Matches	Innings	Series
1	520	Mohammad Shahzad	15	15	2016 ICC World Twenty20
2	345	Hazratullah Zazai	10	10	Ireland v Afghanistan in India in 2019
3	327	Najibullah Zadran	14	13	2017 Desert T20 Challenge
4	312	Najibullah Zadran	14	12	Afghan cricket team in Ireland in 2022
5	196	Ibrahim Zadran	5	5	2022 Asian Cup
Last Updated: 13 September 2022

==== Most ducks ====
A duck refers to a batsman being dismissed without scoring a run. Tillakaratne Dilshan of Sri Lanka, Pakistan's Umar Akmal and Ireland's Kevin O'Brien has scored the equal highest number of ducks in T20Is with 10 such knocks. Afghanistan's Shafiqullah and Asghar Afghan with 5 ducks have the highest number of such knocks for Afghanistan.

Rank	Ducks	Player	Matches	Innings	Period
1	7	Rashid Khan†	90	53	2015–2024
1	7	Gulbadin Naib†	71	60	2012–2024
1	7	Mohammad Nabi†	127	119	2010–2024
4	6	Rahmanullah Gurbaz†	61	61	2019–2024
4	6	Najibullah Zadran†	107	95	2012–2024
Last Updated: 24 June 2024

== Bowling records ==
=== Most career wickets ===
A bowler takes the wicket of a batsman when the form of dismissal is bowled, caught, leg before wicket, stumped or hit wicket. If the batsman is dismissed by run out, obstructing the field, handling the ball, hitting the ball twice or timed out the bowler does not receive credit.

Tim Southee of New Zealand, is the highest wicket-taker in T20Is. Afghanistan's Rashid Khan is third on the all-time.

Rank	Wickets	Player	Matches	Innings	Average	SR	Period
1	150	Rashid Khan†	91	91	13.95	13.93	2015–2024
2	96	Mohammad Nabi†	128	120	28.16	23.04	2010–2024
3	59	Naveen-ul-Haq†	44	44	19.67	14.88	2019–2024
3	59	Mujeeb Ur Rahman†	46	46	18.10	17.08	2018–2024
5	53	Fazalhaq Farooqi†	41	41	18.75	16.83	2021–2024
Last Updated: 26 June 2024

==== Most wickets against each team ====
Opposition	Wickets	Player	Matches	Innings	Span	Ref
Australia	6	Naveen-ul-Haq†	2	2	2022–2024	
Bangladesh	22	Rashid Khan†	11	11	2018–2024	
Canada	5	Samiullah Shinwari	2	2	2010–2012	
England	3	Rashid Khan†	2	2	2016–2022	
England	3	Mohammad Nabi†	3	3	2012–2022	
Hong Kong	11	Mohammad Nabi†	4	4	2014–2016	
India	5	Fareed Ahmad†	3	2	2022–2024	
Ireland	45	Rashid Khan†	21	21	2017–2024	
Kenya	8	Samiullah Shinwari	3	3	2013–2013	
Namibia	3	Hamid Hassan†	1	1	2021–2021	
Namibia	3	Naveen-ul-Haq†	1	1	2021–2021	
Nepal	2	Shapoor Zadran	1	1	2014–2014	
Netherlands	7	Mohammad Nabi†	4	4	2010–2015	
New Zealand	5	Rashid Khan†	2	2	2021–2024	
Oman	5	Sayed Shirzad†	2	2	2017–2017	
Oman	5	Yamin Ahmadzai†	2	2	2017–2017	
Pakistan	8	Fazalhaq Farooqi†	4	4	2022–2023	
Papua New Guinea	3	Fazalhaq Farooqi†	1	1	2024–2024	
Scotland	10	Hamid Hassan†	4	4	2010–2010	
South Africa	3	Hamid Hassan†	1	1	2010–2010	
Sri Lanka	8	Mohammad Nabi†	7	6	2016–2024	
Uganda	5	Fazalhaq Farooqi†	1	1	2024–2024	
United Arab Emirates	15	Rashid Khan†	8	8	2016–2023	
West Indies	8	Karim Janat†	6	5	2017–2024	
West Indies	8	Gulbadin Naib†	8	6	2016–2024	
Zimbabwe	23	Rashid Khan†	15	15	2015–2022	
Last updated: 26 June 2024

=== Best figures in an innings ===
Bowling figures refers to the number of the wickets a bowler has taken and the number of runs conceded.

Rank	Figures	Player	Opposition	Venue	Date
1	5/3	Rashid Khan †	Ireland	Greater Noida Sports Complex Ground, Greater Noida, India	10 March 2017
2	5/9	Fazalhaq Farooqi †	Uganda	Providence Stadium, Providence, Guyana	4 June 2024
3	5/11	Karim Janat †	West Indies	Bharat Ratna Shri Atal Bihari Vajpayee Ekana Cricket Stadium, Lucknow, India	16 November 2019
4	5/13	Samiullah Shinwari	Kenya	Sharjah Cricket Association Stadium, Sharjah, UAE	24 November 2013
5	5/20	Mujeeb Ur Rahman †	Scotland	Sharjah Cricket Association Stadium, Sharjah, UAE	25 October 2021
Last Updated: 7 November 2021

=== Best figures in an innings – progression of record ===
Figures	Player	Opposition	Venue	Date
2/17	Karim Sadiq	Ireland	Paikiasothy Saravanamuttu Stadium, Colombo, Sri Lanka	1 February 2010
3/17	Karim Sadiq	Ireland	Dubai International Cricket Stadium, Dubai, UAE	9 February 2010
4/14	Samiullah Shinwari †	Canada	ICC Global Cricket Academy, Dubai, UAE	18 March 2012
5/13	Samiullah Shinwari †	Kenya	Sharjah Cricket Association Stadium, Sharjah, UAE	24 November 2013
5/3	Rashid Khan †	Ireland	Greater Noida Sports Complex Ground, Greater Noida, India	10 March 2017
Last Updated: 18 March 2021

=== Best Bowling Figure against each opponent ===
Opposition	Player	Figures	Date
Australia	Naveen-ul-Haq	3/21	4 November 2022
Bangladesh	Rashid Khan	4/12	5 June 2018
Canada	Samiullah Shinwari	4/14	18 March 2012
England	Mohammad Nabi	2/17	23 March 2016 ‡
England	Rashid Khan	2/17	23 March 2016 ‡
Hong Kong	Mohammad Nabi	4/17	22 February 2016
India	Shapoor Zadran	2/33	19 September 2012 ‡
Ireland	Rashid Khan	5/3	10 March 2017
Kenya	Hamid Hassan	3/4	30 September 2013
Namibia	Hamid Hassan	3/9	31 October 2021 ‡
Nepal	Shapoor Zadran	2/19	20 March 2014 ‡
Netherlands	Dawlat Zadran	3/17	9 July 2015
New Zealand	Rashid Khan	1/27	7 November 2021 ‡
Oman	Sayed Shirzad	3/16	29 November 2015
Pakistan	Fazalhaq Farooqi	3/31	7 September 2022 ‡
Papua New Guinea	Shapoor Zadran	2/9	23 July 2015
Scotland	Mujeeb Ur Rahman	5/20	25 October 2021 ‡
South Africa	Hamid Hassan	3/21	5 May 2010 ‡
Sri Lanka	Fazalhaq Farooqi	3/11	27 August 2022 ‡
United Arab Emirates	Dawlat Zadran	4/44	16 January 2017
West Indies	Karim Janat	5/11	16 November 2019
Zimbabwe	Noor Ahmad	4/10	14 June 2022
Last updated: 13 September 2022.

=== Best career average ===
A bowler's bowling average is the total number of runs they have conceded divided by the number of wickets they have taken. Nepalan's Sandeep Lamichhane holds the record for the best career average in T20Is with 12.56. Ajantha Mendis, Sri Lankan cricketer, is second behind Sandeep with an overall career average of 14.42 runs per wicket.

Rank	Average	Player	Wickets	Runs	Balls	Period
1	14.21	Rashid Khan †	118	1,677	1,610	2015–2022
2	16.57	Mujeeb Ur Rahman †	45	746	732	2018–2022
3	16.57	Hamid Hassan	35	580	544	2010–2021
4	19.75	Fareed Ahmad†	29	573	399	2016–2022
5	19.77	Fazalhaq Farooqi †	18	356	313	2021–2022
Qualification: 500 balls. Last Updated: 13 September 2022

=== Best career economy rate ===
A bowler's economy rate is the total number of runs they have conceded divided by the number of overs they have bowled. New Zealand's Daniel Vettori, holds the T20I record for the best career economy rate with 5.70. Rashid Khan, with a rate of 6.14 runs per over conceded over his 47-match T20I career, is the highest Afghan on the list.

Rank	Economy rate	Player	Wickets	Runs	Balls	Period
1	6.11	Mujeeb Ur Rahman †	45	746	732	2018–2022
2	6.16	Rashid Khan †	116	1,629	1,584	2015–2022
3	6.39	Hamid Hassan	35	580	544	2010–2021
4	6.51	Samiullah Shinwari	28	688	634	2010–2020
5	6.77	Amir Hamza	30	752	666	2013–2021
Qualification: 500 balls. Last Updated: 13 September 2022

=== Best career strike rate ===
A bowler's strike rate is the total number of balls they have bowled divided by the number of wickets they have taken. The top bowler with the best T20I career strike rate is Rashid Khan of Afghanistan with strike rate of 12.3 balls per wicket.

=== Most four-wickets (& over) hauls in an innings ===
Pakistan's Umar Gul has taken the most four-wickets (or over) among all the bowlers. Rashid khan is the leading Afghan bowler with five such hauls.

Rank	Four-wicket hauls	Player	Innings	Balls	Wickets	Period
1	8	Rashid Khan†	89	2,042	145	2015–2024
2	3	Mohammad Nabi†	118	2,194	95	2010–2024
3	2	Samiullah Shinwari	38	634	28	2010–2022
3	2	Fazalhaq Farooqi†	39	862	52	2021–2024
3	2	Mujeeb Ur Rahman†	46	1,008	59	2018–2024
Last Updated: 21 June 2024

=== Best economy rates in an inning ===
The best economy rate in an inning, when a minimum of 12 balls are delivered by the bowler, is Sri Lankan player Nuwan Kulasekara economy of 0.00 during his spell of 0 runs for 1 wicket in 2 overs against Netherlands at Zohur Ahmed Chowdhury Stadium in the 2014 ICC World Twenty20. Hamid Hassan holds the Afghan record during his spell in Kenya v Afghanistan Series at Sharjah, UAE.

Rank	Economy	Player	Overs	Runs	Wickets	Opposition	Venue	Date
1	1.33	Hamid Hassan	3	4	3	Kenya	Sharjah Cricket Stadium, Sharjah, UAE	30 September 2013
2	1.50	Rashid Khan †	2	3	5	Ireland	Greater Noida Sports Complex Ground, Greater Noida, India	10 March 2017
3	1.90	Samiullah Shinwari	3.4	7	2	Kenya	Sharjah Cricket Stadium, Sharjah, UAE	30 September 2013
4	2.00	Shapoor Zadran	4	8	1	Scotland	Sheikh Zayed Cricket Stadium, Abu Dhabi, UAE	10 February 2010
4	2.00	Mirwais Ashraf	3	6	2	Kenya	Sharjah Cricket Stadium, Sharjah, UAE	30 September 2013
Qualification: 12 balls bowled. Last Updated: 18 March 2021

=== Best strike rates in an inning ===
The best strike rate in an inning, when a minimum of 4 wickets are taken by the player, is by Steve Tikolo of Kenya during his spell of 4/2 in 1.2 overs against Scotland during the 2013 ICC World Twenty20 Qualifier at ICC Academy, Dubai, UAE. Rashid Khan during his spell of 5/3 in two overs achieved the best strike rate for an Afghan bowler.

Rank	Strike rate	Player	Wickets	Runs	Balls	Opposition	Venue	Date
1	2.4	Rashid Khan †	5	3	12	Ireland	Greater Noida Sports Complex Ground, Greater Noida, India	10 March 2017
2	3.5	Mohammad Nabi †	4	10	14	Ireland	Dubai International Cricket Stadium, Dubai, UAE	20 January 2017
2	3.5	Rashid Khan †	4	9	14	Scotland	Sharjah Cricket Stadium, Sharjah, UAE	25 October 2021 ‡
3	4.0	Fareed Ahmad†	3	14	12	Ireland	Civil Service Cricket Club, Belfast, Northern Ireland	15 August 2022
4	4.5	Rashid Khan †	4	17	18	Ireland	Bready Cricket Club Ground, Magheramason, Northern Ireland	22 August 2018
Last Updated: 7 September 2022

=== Worst figures in an innings ===
The worst figures in a T20I came in the Sri Lanka's tour of Australia when Kasun Rajitha of Sri Lanka had figures of 0/75 off his four overs at Adelaide Oval, Adelaide. The worst figures by an Afghan is 0/51 that came off the bowling of Rashid Khan in the 2016 ICC World Twenty20 against South Africa at Wankhede Stadium, Mumbai.

Rank	Figures	Player	Overs	Opposition	Venue	Date
1	0/59	Naveen-ul-Haq	4	India	Sheikh Zayed Cricket Stadium, Abu Dhabi, UAE	3 November 2021 ‡
2	0/51	Rashid Khan †	4	South Africa	Wankhede Stadium, Mumbai, India	20 March 2016 ‡
3	0/51	Fazalhaq Farooqi †	4	India	Dubai International Cricket Stadium, Dubai, UAE	8 September 2022
4	0/48	Mohammad Nabi †	4	Ireland	Greater Noida Sports Complex Ground, Greater Noida, India	8 March 2017
5	0/48	Karim Janat †	4	Pakistan	Dubai International Cricket Stadium, Dubai, UAE	29 October 2021
Last Updated: 7 September 2022

=== Most runs conceded in a match ===
Kasun Rajitha also holds the dubious distinction of most runs conceded in a T20I during the aforementioned match. Shapoor Zadran with figures of 1/60 off his four overs against Ireland in March 2017 holds the most runs conceded distinction for Afghanistan.

Rank	Figures	Player	Overs	Opposition	Venue	Date
1	1/60	Shapoor Zadran	4	Ireland	Greater Noida Sports Complex Ground, Greater Noida, India	12 March 2017
2	0/59	Naveen-ul-Haq	4	India	Sheikh Zayed Cricket Stadium, Abu Dhabi, UAE	3 November 2021 ‡
3	2/56	Izatullah Dawlatzai	3	England	Ranasinghe Premadasa Stadium, Colombo, Sri Lanka	21 September 2012 ‡
4	2/57	Fareed Ahmad†	4	India	Dubai International Cricket Stadium, Dubai, UAE	8 September 2022
5	1/52	Dawlat Zadran	4	Ireland	Sheikh Zayed Cricket Stadium, Abu Dhabi, UAE	30 November 2013
5	1/52	Rashid Khan †	4	Zimbabwe	Queens Sports Club, Bulawayo, Zimbabwe	28 October 2015
Last updated: 7 September 2022

=== Most wickets in a calendar year ===
Australia's Andrew Tye holds the record for most wickets taken in a year when he took 31 wickets in 2018 in 19 T20Is. Rashid Khan took 23 wickets in 2016, the most for an Afghan bowler.

Rank	Wickets	Player	Matches	Innings	Year
1	24	Naveen-ul-Haq†	15	15	2024
2	23	Fazalhaq Farooqi†	15	15	2024
2	23	Rashid Khan	15	15	2016
4	22	Rashid Khan	10	10	2024
5	21	Mohammad Nabi	15	15	2016
Last Updated: 26 June 2024

=== Most wickets in a series ===
2019 ICC World Twenty20 Qualifier at UAE saw records set for the most wickets taken by a bowler in a T20I series when Oman's pacer Bilal Khan tool 18 wickets during the series. Mohammad Nabi in the 2016 ICC World Twenty20 took 12 wickets, the most for an Afghan bowler in a series.

Rank	Wickets	Player	Matches	Series
1	12	Mohammad Nabi †	7	2016 ICC World Twenty20
2	11	Rashid Khan †	7	2016 ICC World Twenty20
2	11	Rashid Khan †	3	Ireland v Afghanistan in India in 2019
4	9	Rashid Khan †	3	Ireland v Afghanistan in India in 2017
5	8	Mohammad Nabi †	4	2010 ICC World Twenty20 Qualifier
5	8	Dawlat Zadran	6	2015 ICC World Twenty20 Qualifier
5	8	Mirwais Ashraf	6	2015 ICC World Twenty20 Qualifier
5	8	Rashid Khan †	3	Bangladesh v Afghanistan in India in 2018
5	8	Rashid Khan †	5	2021 ICC Men's T20 World Cup
Last Updated: 7 November 2021

=== Hat-trick ===
In cricket, a hat-trick occurs when a bowler takes three wickets with consecutive deliveries. The deliveries may be interrupted by an over bowled by another bowler from the other end of the pitch or the other team's innings, but must be three consecutive deliveries by the individual bowler in the same match. Only wickets attributed to the bowler count towards a hat-trick; run outs do not count. In T20Is history there have been just 13 hat-tricks, the first achieved by Brett Lee for Australia against Bangladesh in 2007 ICC World Twenty20.

No.	Bowler	Against	Wickets	Venue	Date	Ref.
1	Rashid Khan	Ireland	Kevin O'Brien (c Shafiqullah); George Dockrell (c Mohammad Nabi); Shane Getkate (st †Shafiqullah); Simi Singh (lbw)	(India) Rajiv Gandhi International Cricket Stadium, Dehradun	24 February 2019	
Last Updated: 18 March 2021

== Wicket-keeping records ==
The wicket-keeper is a specialist fielder who stands behind the stumps being guarded by the batsman on strike and is the only member of the fielding side allowed to wear gloves and leg pads.

=== Most career dismissals ===
A wicket-keeper can be credited with the dismissal of a batsman in two ways, caught or stumped. A fair catch is taken when the ball is caught fully within the field of play without it bouncing after the ball has touched the striker's bat or glove holding the bat, Laws 5.6.2.2 and 5.6.2.3 state that the hand or the glove holding the bat shall be regarded as the ball striking or touching the bat while a stumping occurs when the wicket-keeper puts down the wicket while the batsman is out of his ground and not attempting a run. Afghanistan's Mohammad Shahzad is fifth in taking most dismissals in T20Is as a designated wicket-keeper with India's MS Dhoni and West Indian Denesh Ramdin heading the list.

Rank	Dismissals	Player	Matches	Innings	Catches	Stumping	Dis/Inn	Period
1	61	Mohammad Shahzad	73	71	33	28	0.859	2010–2024
2	37	Rahmanullah Gurbaz†	61	50	33	4	0.740	2019–2024
3	3	Shafiqullah	46	6	1	2	0.500	2017–2019
4	2	Afsar Zazai†	8	4	0	2	0.500	2013–2023
5	1	Mohammad Ishaq†	4	4	1	0	0.250	2024-2024
Last updated: 24 June 2024

=== Most career catches ===
Shahzad is eighth in taking most catches in T20Is as a designated wicket-keeper with Dhoni and Ramdin leading the all-time list.

Rank	Catches	Player	Matches	Innings	Period
1	33	Rahmanullah Gurbaz†	61	50	2019–2024
1	33	Mohammad Shahzad	73	71	2010–2021
3	1	Mohammad Ishaq†	4	4	2024-2024
3	1	Shafiqullah	46	6	2017–2019
Last Updated: 24 June 2024

=== Most career stumpings ===
Shahzad is fourth in making stumpings in T20Is as a designated wicket-keeper with Dhoni and Kamran Akmal of Pakistan heading this all-time list.

Rank	Stumpings	Player	Matches	Innings	Period
1	28	Mohammad Shahzad	73	71	2010–2023
2	4	Rahmanullah Gurbaz†	61	50	2019–2024
3	2	Afsar Zazai†	8	4	2013–2023
3	2	Shafiqullah	46	6	2017–2019
Last Updated: 24 June 2024

=== Most dismissals in an innings ===
Four wicket-keepers on four occasions have taken five dismissals in a single innings in a T20I. Mohammad Shahzad of Afghanistan has also achieved this feat.

The feat of taking 4 dismissals in an innings has been achieved by 19 wicket-keepers on 26 occasions.

Rank	Dismissals	Player	Opposition	Venue	Date
1	5 ♠	Mohammad Shahzad	Oman	Sheikh Zayed Cricket Stadium, Abu Dhabi, UAE	29 November 2015
2	3	Mohammad Shahzad	Netherlands	The Grange, Edinburgh, Scotland	9 July 2015
2	3	Mohammad Shahzad	Oman	Dubai International Cricket Stadium, Dubai, UAE	20 January 2017
4	2	On 12 occasions an Afghan wicket keeper has made 2 dismissals in an innings.			
Last Updated: 21 March 2021

=== Most dismissals in a series ===
Netherlands wicket-keeper Scott Edwards holds the T20Is record for the most dismissals taken by a wicket-keeper in a series. He made 13 dismissals during the 2019 ICC World Twenty20 Qualifier. Afghan record is held by Shahzad when he made 7 dismissals during the 2017 Desert T20 Challenge.

Rank	Dismissals	Player	Matches	Innings	Series
1	7	Mohammad Shahzad	4	4	2017 Desert T20 Challenge
2	6	Mohammad Shahzad	2	2	Afghanistan v Oman in the UAE in 2015-16
3	5	Mohammad Shahzad	6	6	2015 ICC World Twenty20 Qualifier
3	5	Mohammad Shahzad	7	7	2016 ICC World Twenty20
5	4	Mohammad Shahzad	4	4	2013 ICC World Twenty20 Qualifier
5	4	Mohammad Shahzad	5	5	2021 ICC Men's T20 World Cup
Last Updated: 7 November 2021

== Fielding records ==
=== Most career catches ===
Caught is one of the nine methods a batsman can be dismissed in cricket. (Note: In 2017, The Laws of Cricket were amended, reducing the methods of dismissals from ten to nine, with handled the ball now covered as part of obstructing the field.) The majority of catches are caught in the slips, located behind the batsman, next to the wicket-keeper, on the off side of the field. Most slip fielders are top order batsmen.

South Africa's David Miller holds the record for the most catches in T20Is by a non-wicket-keeper with 57, followed by Shoaib Malik of Pakistan on 50 and New Zealand's Martin Guptill with 47. Mohammad Nabi is the leading catcher for Afghanistan.

Rank	Catches	Player	Innings	Ct/Inn	Period
1	70	Mohammad Nabi†	128	0.546	2010–2024
2	44	Najibullah Zadran†	107	0.411	2012–2024
3	36	Rashid Khan†	91	0.395	2015–2024
4	30	Gulbadin Naib†	71	0.422	2012–2024
5	20	Asghar Afghan	75	0.266	2010–2021
Last Updated: 26 June 2024

=== Most catches in an innings ===
The feat of taking 4 catches in an innings has been achieved by 14 fielders on 14 occasions. . No Afghan fielder has achieved this feat. The most is three catches on three occasions.

Rank	Dismissals	Player	Opposition	Venue	Date
1	3	Nawroz Mangal	South Africa	Kensington Oval, Bridgetown, Barbados	5 May 2010
1	3	Shafiqullah	Scotland	The Grange, Edinburgh, Scotland	12 July 2015
1	3	Mohammad Nabi †	Ireland	Greater Noida Sports Complex Ground, Greater Noida, India	12 March 2017
4	2	13 Afghan fielders on 33 occasions took 2 catches in an inning.			
Last Updated: 21 March 2021

=== Most catches in a series ===
The 2019 ICC Men's T20 World Cup Qualifier, which saw Netherlands retain their title, saw the record set for the most catches taken by a non-wicket-keeper in a T20I series. Jersey's Ben Stevens and Namibia's JJ Smit took 10 catches in the series. Asghar Afghan, Mohammad Nabi and Shafiqullah with 5 catches in the same series are the leading Afghan fielders on this list.

Rank	Catches	Player	Matches	Innings	Series
1	53	Mohammad Nabi †	5	5	Afghan cricket team in Ireland in 2022
2	5	Asghar Afghan †	6	6	2015 ICC World Twenty20 Qualifier
2	5	Mohammad Nabi †	6	6	2015 ICC World Twenty20 Qualifier
2	5	Shafiqullah †	6	6	2015 ICC World Twenty20 Qualifier
5	4	Najibullah Zadran †	6	6	2015 ICC World Twenty20 Qualifier
5	4	Mohammad Nabi †	3	3	Afghanistan cricket team in the UAE in 2016-17
5	4	Mohammad Nabi †	3	3	Ireland v Afghanistan in India in 2017
5	4	Rashid Khan †	4	4	2019–20 Bangladesh Tri-Nation Series
5	4	Rashid Khan †	3	3	Ireland v Afghanistan in India in 2019
Last Updated: 7 September 2022

== Other records ==
=== Most career matches ===
Pakistan's Shoaib Malik holds the record for the most T20I matches played with 116, followed by Rohit Sharma of India with 108 and Ross Taylor of New Zealand with 102 games. Mohammad Nabi is the most experienced Afghanistan players having represented the team on 78 occasions.

Rank	Matches	Player	Runs	Wkts	Period
1	126	Mohammad Nabi†	2,154	95	2010–2024
2	107	Najibullah Zadran†	1,830	-	2012–2024
3	89	Rashid Khan†	422	145	2015–2024
4	75	Asghar Afghan	1,382	1	2010–2021
5	73	Mohammad Shahzad	2,048	-	2010–2023
Last Updated: 21 June 2024

=== Most consecutive career matches ===
Afghanistan's Mohammad Shahzad and Asghar Afghan hold the record for the most consecutive T20I matches played with 58.

Rank	Matches	Player	Period
1	79	Rashid Khan	2016-2023
2	77	Najibullah Zadran	2016-2023
3	71	Mohammad Nabi	2016–2022
4	64	Asghar Afghan	2014-2021
5	58	Mohammad Shahzad	2010-2017
Last updated: 20 July 2023

=== Most matches as captain ===
Rank	Matches	Player	Won	Lost	Tied	NR	Win %	Period
1	52	Asghar Afghan	42	9	1	0	81.73	2015–2021
2	35	Mohammad Nabi	16	19	0	0	45.71	2013–2022
3	25	Rashid Khan†	15	10	0	0	60.00	2019–2024
4	13	Nawroz Mangal	6	7	0	0	46.15	2010–2012
5	9	Ibrahim Zadran†	3	5	1	0	38.88	2023–2024
Last Updated: 26 June 2024

=== Most matches won as a captain ===
Rank	Won	Player	Played	Lost	Tied	NR	Win %	Period
1	42	Asghar Afghan	52	9	1	0	81.73	2015–2021
2	16	Mohammad Nabi	35	19	0	0	45.71	2013–2022
3	13	Rashid Khan†	23	10	0	0	56.52	2019–2024
4	6	Nawroz Mangal	13	7	0	0	46.15	2010–2012
5	3	Ibrahim Zadran†	9	5	1	0	38.88	2023–2024
Last Updated: 21 June 2024

==== Most man of the match awards ====
Rank	M.O.M	Player	Matches	Period
1	14	Mohammad Nabi†	126	2010–2024
2	9	Mohammad Shahzad	73	2010–2023
3	7	Rahmanullah Gurbaz†	60	2019–2024
3	7	Rashid Khan†	89	2015–2024
5	6	Najibullah Zadran†	107	2012–2024
Last Updated: 21 June 2024

==== Most man of the series awards ====
Rank	M.O.S	Player	Matches	Period
1	3	Rashid Khan†	89	2015–2024
1	3	Mohammad Nabi†	126	2010–2024
3	2	Karim Janat†	63	2016–2024
4	1	Fazalhaq Farooqi†	39	2021–2024
4	1	Rahmanullah Gurbaz†	60	2019–2024
4	1	Samiullah Shinwari	65	2010–2022
4	1	Mohammad Shahzad	73	2010–2021
4	1	Najibullah Zadran†	107	2012–2024
Last Updated: 21 June 2024

=== Youngest players on Debut ===
The youngest player to play in a T20I match is Marian Gherasim at the age of 14 years and 16 days. Making his debut for Romania against the Bulgaria on 16 October 2020 in the first T20I of the 2020 Balkan Cup thus becoming the youngest to play in a men's T20I match.

Rank	Age	Player	Opposition	Venue	Date
1	16 years and 314 days	Mujeeb Ur Rahman	Zimbabwe	Sharjah Cricket Association Stadium, Sharjah, UAE	5 February 2018
2	17 years and 36 days	Rashid Khan	Zimbabwe	Queens Sports Club, Bulawayo, Zimbabwe	26 October 2015
3	17 years and 290 days	Rahmanullah Gurbaz	Zimbabwe	Sher-e-Bangla National Cricket Stadium, Mirpur, Bangladesh	14 September 2019
4	17 years and 337 days	Ibrahim Zadran	West Indies	Bharat Ratna Shri Atal Bihari Vajpayee Ekana Cricket Stadium, Lucknow, India	14 November 2019
5	18 years and 125 days	Karim Janat	United Arab Emirates	ICC Global Cricket Academy, Dubai, UAE	14 December 2016
Last Updated: 18 March 2021

=== Oldest Players on Debut ===
The Turkish batsmen Osman Göker is the oldest player to make their debut a T20I match. Playing in the 2019 Continental Cup against Romania at Moara Vlasiei Cricket Ground, Moara Vlăsiei he was aged 59 years and 181 days.

Rank	Age	Player	Opposition	Venue	Date
1	29 years and 71 days	Fazal Niazai	Zimbabwe	Zahur Ahmed Chowdhury Stadium, Chittagong, Bangladesh	20 September 2019
2	26 years and 331 days	Rokhan Barakzai	Hong Kong	Sheikh Zayed Cricket Stadium, Abu Dhabi, UAE	28 November 2015
3	26 years and 27 days	Karim Sadiq	Ireland	P. Sara Oval, Colombo, Sri Lanka	1 February 2010
4	25 years and 201 days	Nawroz Mangal	Ireland	P. Sara Oval, Colombo, Sri Lanka	1 February 2010
5	25 years and 151 days	Raees Ahmadzai	Ireland	P. Sara Oval, Colombo, Sri Lanka	1 February 2010
Last Updated: 18 March 2021

=== Oldest Players ===
The Turkish batsmen Osman Göker is the oldest player to appear in a T20I match during the same above mentioned match.

Rank	Age	Player	Opposition	Venue	Date
1	37 years and 307 days	Mohammad Nabi†	Australia	Adelaide Oval, Adelaide, Australia	4 November 2022
2	34 years and 301 days	Mohammad Shahzad†	New Zealand	Sheikh Zayed Cricket Stadium, Abu Dhabi, UAE	7 November 2021
3	34 years and 246 days	Samiullah Shinwari	Sri Lanka	Sharjah Cricket Stadium, Sharjah, UAE	3 September 2022 ‡
4	34 years and 159 days	Hamid Hassan	New Zealand	Sheikh Zayed Cricket Stadium, Abu Dhabi, UAE	7 November 2021
5	34 years and 32 days	Karim Sadiq	Zimbabwe	Sharjah Cricket Stadium, Sharjah, UAE	6 February 2018
Last Updated: 25 February 2023

== Partnership records ==
In cricket, two batsmen are always present at the crease batting together in a partnership. This partnership will continue until one of them is dismissed, retires or the innings comes to a close.

=== Highest partnerships by wicket ===
A wicket partnership describes the number of runs scored before each wicket falls. The first wicket partnership is between the opening batsmen and continues until the first wicket falls. The second wicket partnership then commences between the not out batsman and the number three batsman. This partnership continues until the second wicket falls. The third wicket partnership then commences between the not out batsman and the new batsman. This continues down to the tenth wicket partnership. When the tenth wicket has fallen, there is no batsman left to partner so the innings is closed.

Wicket	Runs	First batsman	Second batsman	Opposition	Venue	Date
1st Wicket	236 ♠	Hazratullah Zazai	Usman Ghani	Ireland	Rajiv Gandhi International Cricket Stadium, Dehradun, India	23 February 2019
2nd Wicket	110	Asghar Afghan	Mohammad Shahzad	Scotland	The Grange, Edinburgh, Scotland	12 July 2015
3rd Wicket	116	Asghar Afghan	Hazratullah Zazai	Ireland	Bready Cricket Club Ground, Magheramason, Northern Ireland	22 August 2018
4th Wicket	80	Mohammad Shahzad	Samiullah Shinwari	Canada	ICC Global Cricket Academy, Dubai, UAE	18 March 2012
5th Wicket	107	Mohammad Nabi	Najibullah Zadran	Zimbabwe	Sher-e-Bangla National Cricket Stadium, Mirpur, Bangladesh	14 September 2019
6th Wicket	86*	Mohammad Nabi	Najibullah Zadran	Ireland	Rajiv Gandhi International Cricket Stadium, Dehradun, India	21 February 2019
7th Wicket	71*	Mohammad Nabi	Gulbadin Naib	Pakistan	Dubai International Cricket Stadium, Dubai, UAE	29 October 2021 ‡
8th Wicket	33*	Ibrahim Zadran	Mujeeb Ur Rahman	India	Dubai International Cricket Stadium, Dubai, UAE	8 September 2022
9th Wicket	44	Gulbadin Naib	Shapoor Zadran	England	Ranasinghe Premadasa Stadium, Colombo, Sri Lanka	21 September 2012
10th Wicket	23*	Fareed Ahmad	Mujeeb Ur Rahman	West Indies	Bharat Ratna Shri Atal Bihari Vajpayee Ekana Cricket Stadium, Lucknow, India	14 November 2019
Last Updated: 8 September 2022

=== Highest partnerships by runs ===
The highest T20I partnership by runs for any wicket is held by the Afghani pairing of Hazratullah Zazai and Usman Ghani who put together an opening wicket partnership of 236 runs during the Ireland v Afghanistan series in India in 2019

Wicket	Runs	First batsman	Second batsman	Opposition	Venue	Date
1st Wicket	236 ♠	Hazratullah Zazai	Usman Ghani	Ireland	Rajiv Gandhi International Cricket Stadium, Dehradun, India	23 February 2019
1st Wicket	154	Rahmanullah Gurbaz	Ibrahim Zadran	Uganda	Providence Stadium, Providence, Guyana	7 June 2024
1st Wicket	137	Rahmanullah Gurbaz	Ibrahim Zadran	United Arab Emirates	Sharjah Cricket Stadium, Sharjah, United Arab Emirates	29 December 2023
3rd Wicket	116	Hazratullah Zazai	Asghar Afghan	Ireland	Bready Cricket Club Ground, Magheramason, Northern Ireland	22 August 2018
2nd Wicket	110	Mohammad Shahzad	Asghar Afghan	Scotland	The Grange, Edinburgh, Scotland	12 July 2015
5th Wicket	107	Mohammad Nabi	Najibullah Zadran	Zimbabwe	Sher-e-Bangla National Cricket Stadium, Mirpur, Bangladesh	14 September 2019
Last Updated: 19 March 2021				Zimbabwe		

=== Highest overall partnership runs by a pair ===
Rank	Runs	Innings	Players	Highest	Average	100/50	T20I career span
1	1,273	44	Mohammad Nabi & Najibullah Zadran †	107	35.36	1/8	2013–2024
2	1,101	34	Hazratullah Zazai & Rahmanullah Gurbaz †	90	32.38	0/9	2019–2024
3	1,039	22	Ibrahim Zadran & Rahmanullah Gurbaz †	154	47.22	4/4	2019–2024
4	708	15	Asghar Afghan & Mohammad Shahzad	110	47.2	1/5	2013–2021
5	563	23	Mohammad Nabi & Samiullah Shinwari	98	24.47	0/4	2010–2019
An asterisk (*) signifies an unbroken partnership (i.e. neither of the batsmen was dismissed before either the end of the allotted overs or the required score being reached). Last updated: 24 June 2024

== Umpiring records ==
=== Most matches umpired ===
An umpire in cricket is a person who officiates the match according to the Laws of Cricket. Two umpires adjudicate the match on the field, whilst a third umpire has access to video replays, and a fourth umpire looks after the match balls and other duties. The records below are only for on-field umpires.

Ahsan Raza of Pakistan holds the record for the most T20I matches umpired with 49. The most experienced Aghani umpire is Ahmed Shah Pakteen with 20 matches officiated so far.

Rank	Matches	Umpire	Period
1	22	Ahmed Shah Pakteen †	2017–2022
2	14	Ahmed Shah Durrani †	2016–2021
3	10	Izatullah Safi †	2018–2021
4	6	Bismillah Jan Shinwari †	2018–2020
Last Updated: 13 September 2022

== See also ==
- List of Twenty20 International cricket records
- List of Twenty20 International cricket hat-tricks
- List of Test cricket records
- List of One Day International cricket records
