= Bangladeshi cricket team against Afghanistan in India in 2018 =

International cricket tour

Bangladeshi cricket team against Afghanistan in 2018
	Afghanistan	Bangladesh
- Dates: 1 – 7 June 2018
Captains	Asghar Stanikzai	Shakib Al Hasan

Twenty20 International series
- Results: Afghanistan won the 3-match series 3–0
Most runs	Samiullah Shinwari (118)	Mahmudullah (88); Mushfiqur Rahim (88)
Most wickets	Rashid Khan (8)	Abu Jayed (3)
- Player of the series: Rashid Khan (Afg)

The Bangladesh cricket team toured India to play three Twenty20 Internationals (T20Is) against the Afghanistan cricket team in Dehradun.

Afghanistan won the first two matches of the series, therefore giving them an unassailable lead. This gave them their first bilateral T20I series win against another Test team other than Zimbabwe. Afghanistan went on to win the series 3–0.

== Background ==
Originally the matches were scheduled to be played as One Day Internationals (ODIs), but the Bangladesh Cricket Board (BCB) agreed to change the fixtures to T20Is in preparation for the 2020 ICC World Twenty20 tournament. In May 2018, the Afghanistan Cricket Board (ACB) confirmed that all three matches will be played at the Rajiv Gandhi International Cricket Stadium. These were the first international cricket matches to be played at the venue.

Ahead of the T20Is, Bangladesh played a practice match against Afghanistan A.

Prior to this series, Afghanistan and Bangladesh had only played each other once before in a T20I, in the group stage of the 2014 ICC World Twenty20 tournament, with Bangladesh winning by nine wickets.

== Squads ==
Afghanistan	Bangladesh
Asghar Stanikzai (c); Sharafuddin Ashraf; Aftab Alam; Usman Ghani; Karim Janat; Rashid Khan; Mohammad Nabi; Gulbadin Naib; Darwish Rasooli; Shafiqullah; Mohammad Shahzad (wk); Samiullah Shinwari; Najeeb Tarakai; Mujeeb Ur Rahman; Najibullah Zadran; Shapoor Zadran; Hazratullah Zazai	Shakib Al Hasan (c); Litton Das; Ariful Haque; Abul Hasan; Mehedi Hasan; Abu Hider; Mosaddek Hossain; Rubel Hossain; Tamim Iqbal; Nazmul Islam; Abu Jayed; Mahmudullah; Mushfiqur Rahim (wk); ~~Mustafizur Rahman~~; Sabbir Rahman; Soumya Sarkar

Ahead of the series, Mustafizur Rahman was ruled out of Bangladesh's squad due to injury. Abul Hasan was named as his replacement. Hazratullah Zazai was added to Afghanistan's squad ahead of the first T20I.

== Tour match ==
=== Practice match:Afghanistan A vs Bangladesh ===
1 June 2018

Bangladesh; 145/6 (20 overs)	v	Afghanistan A 147/2 (17.2 overs)

Afghanistan A won by 8 wickets

== T20I Series ==
=== 1st T20I ===
3 June 2018
20:00 (N)
Scorecard

Afghanistan; 167/8 (20 overs)	v	Bangladesh; 122 (19 overs)
Mohammad Shahzad 40 (37); Mahmudullah 2/1 (1 over)		Litton Das 30 (20); Rashid Khan 3/13 (3 overs)

Afghanistan won by 45 runs
Rajiv Gandhi International Cricket Stadium, Dehradun
Umpires: Ahmed Shah Pakteen (Afg) and Bismillah Jan Shinwari (Afg)
Player of the match: Rashid Khan (Afg)

- Bangladesh won the toss and elected to field.
- The venue hosted its first international cricket match.
- Rashid Khan (Afg) became the fastest bowler, in terms of time, to take 50 wickets in T20Is (2 years and 220 days).

=== 2nd T20I ===
5 June 2018
20:00 (N)
Scorecard

Bangladesh; 134/8 (20 overs)	v	Afghanistan; 135/4 (18.5 overs)
Tamim Iqbal 43 (48); Rashid Khan 4/12 (4 overs)		Samiullah Shinwari 49 (41); Mosaddek Hossain 2/21 (3 overs)

Afghanistan won by 6 wickets
Rajiv Gandhi International Cricket Stadium, Dehradun
Umpires: Izatullah Safi (Afg) and Bismillah Jan Shinwari (Afg)
Player of the match: Rashid Khan (Afg)

- Bangladesh won the toss and elected to bat.

=== 3rd T20I ===
7 June 2018
20:00 (N)
Scorecard

Afghanistan; 145/6 (20 overs)	v	Bangladesh; 144/6 (20 overs)
Samiullah Shinwari 33* (28); Nazmul Islam 2/18 (4 overs)		Mushfiqur Rahim 46 (37); Rashid Khan 1/24 (4 overs)

Afghanistan won by 1 run
Rajiv Gandhi International Cricket Stadium, Dehradun
Umpires: Ahmed Shah Pakteen (Afg) and Izatullah Safi (Afg)
Player of the match: Mushfiqur Rahim (Ban)

- Afghanistan won the toss and elected to bat.
- Shakib Al Hasan became the quickest Bangladesh player and third overall to score 10,000 runs and take 500 wickets in international cricket.
