= Afghan cricket team in Ireland in 2022 =

International cricket tour

| | Ireland | Afghanistan |
- Dates: 9 – 17 August 2022
| Captains | Andrew Balbirnie | Mohammad Nabi |

Twenty20 International series
- Results: Ireland won the 5-match series 3–2
| Most runs | George Dockrell (141) | Najibullah Zadran (125) |
| Most wickets | Josh Little (7); Mark Adair (7) | Naveen-ul-Haq (7) |
- Player of the series: George Dockrell (Ire)

The Afghanistan cricket team toured Ireland in August 2022 to play five Twenty20 International (T20I) matches. Initially, the tour included a one-off Test match, but this was dropped from the fixtures when Cricket Ireland announced the schedule in March 2022. Cricket Ireland confirmed the dates and venues for the tour later the same month. The matches were used by both teams as preparation for the 2022 ICC Men's T20 World Cup.

Ireland won the series 3–2 after claiming a victory in a rain-affected final match. George Dockrell was named player of the series.

== Squads ==
| Ireland | Afghanistan |
|---|---|
| Andrew Balbirnie (c); Mark Adair; Curtis Campher; Gareth Delany; George Dockrell; Stephen Doheny; Fionn Hand; Graham Hume; Josh Little; Andy McBrine; Barry McCarthy; Simi Singh; Paul Stirling; Harry Tector; Lorcan Tucker; Craig Young | Mohammad Nabi (c); Fareed Ahmad; Noor Ahmad; Sharafuddin Ashraf; Fazalhaq Farooqi; Usman Ghani; Rahmanullah Gurbaz; Karim Janat; Rashid Khan; Azmatullah Omarzai; Darwish Rasooli; Hashmatullah Shahidi; Naveen-ul-Haq; Mujeeb Ur Rahman; Ibrahim Zadran; Najibullah Zadran; Afsar Zazai; Hazratullah Zazai |

The Afghanistan Cricket Board (ACB) also named Qais Ahmad, Nijat Masood, Usman Ghani and Mujeeb Ur Rahman as reserve players for the series. Usman Ghani and Mujeeb Ur Rahman, who were only temporarily named as reserves, were later added to the main squad once they received clearance regarding their visas. Simi Singh was added to Ireland's squad after the third T20I, in place of Andy McBrine.

== T20I series ==
=== 1st T20I ===
9 August 2022
15:30
Scorecard

| Afghanistan; 168/7 (20 overs) | v | Ireland; 171/3 (19.5 overs) |
| Usman Ghani 59 (42); Barry McCarthy 3/34 (4 overs) | | Andrew Balbirnie 51 (38); Mujeeb Ur Rahman 1/22 (3 overs) |

Ireland won by 7 wickets
Stormont Cricket Ground, Belfast
Umpires: Roland Black (Ire) and Paul Reynolds (Ire)
Player of the match: Andrew Balbirnie (Ire)

- Afghanistan won the toss and elected to bat.

=== 2nd T20I ===
11 August 2022
15:30
Scorecard

| Afghanistan; 122/8 (20 overs) | v | Ireland; 125/5 (19 overs) |
| Hashmatullah Shahidi 36 (42); Mark Adair 2/12 (3 overs) | | Andrew Balbirnie 46 (36); Mohammad Nabi 2/15 (2 overs) |

Ireland won by 5 wickets
Stormont Cricket Ground, Belfast
Umpires: Jareth McCready (Ire) and Paul Reynolds (Ire)
Player of the match: Josh Little (Ire)

- Afghanistan won the toss and elected to bat.

=== 3rd T20I ===
12 August 2022
15:30
Scorecard

| Afghanistan; 189/5 (20 overs) | v | Ireland; 167/9 (20 overs) |
| Rahmanullah Gurbaz 53 (35); Josh Little 2/29 (4 overs) | | George Dockrell 58* (37); Naveen-ul-Haq 3/38 (4 overs) |

Afghanistan won by 22 runs
Stormont Cricket Ground, Belfast
Umpires: Roland Black (Ire) and Mark Hawthorne (Ire)
Player of the match: Rahmanullah Gurbaz (Afg)

- Ireland won the toss and elected to field.
- Fionn Hand and Graham Hume (Ire) both made their T20I debuts.

=== 4th T20I ===
15 August 2022
15:30
Scorecard

| Afghanistan; 132/6 (11 overs) | v | Ireland; 105 (11 overs) |
| Najibullah Zadran 50 (24); Gareth Delany 3/33 (3 overs) | | George Dockrell 41* (27); Fareed Ahmad 3/14 (2 overs) |

Afghanistan won by 27 runs
Stormont Cricket Ground, Belfast
Umpires: Mark Hawthorne (Ire) and Paul Reynolds (Ire)
Player of the match: Rashid Khan (Afg)

- Ireland won the toss and elected to field.
- The match was reduced to 11 overs per side due to rain.

=== 5th T20I ===
17 August 2022
15:30
Scorecard

| Afghanistan; 95/5 (15 overs) | v | Ireland; 56/3 (6.4 overs) |
| Usman Ghani 44* (40); Mark Adair 3/16 (2 overs) | | Paul Stirling 16 (10); Mujeeb Ur Rahman 2/17 (2 overs) |

Ireland won by 7 wickets (DLS method)
Stormont Cricket Ground, Belfast
Umpires: Roland Black (Ire) and Jareth McCready (Ire)
Player of the match: Mark Adair (Ire)

- Ireland won the toss and elected to field.
- Rain prevented further play in the Afghanistan innings. Ireland were set a revised target of 56 runs from 7 overs.
