= Afghan cricket team against Oman in the UAE in 2015–16 =

International cricket tour

Afghanistan cricket team against Oman in the UAE in 2015–16
	Afghanistan	Oman
- Dates: 16 November 2015 – 30 November 2015
Captains	Asghar Stanikzai	Sultan Ahmed

Twenty20 International series
- Results: Afghanistan won the 2-match series 2–0
Most runs	Usman Ghani (74)	Adnan Ilyas (54)
Most wickets	Sayed Shirzad (5); Yamin Ahmadzai (5)	Mehran Khan (3); Bilal Khan (3); Zeeshan Maqsood (3)

The Afghanistan cricket team toured the United Arab Emirates to play Oman in November 2015. The tour consisted of two Twenty20 International (T20I) matches and a three-day tour match. Afghanistan won the 2-match series 2–0. The three-day match was drawn. The matches were in preparation for the 2016 Asia Cup Qualifier.

== Squads ==
Afghanistan	Oman
Asghar Stanikzai (c); Shabir Noori; Noor Ali Zadran; Javed Ahmadi; Mohammad Nabi; Samiullah Shinwari; Rahmat Shah; Rashid Khan; Sharafuddin Ashraf; Mohammad Shahzad; Dawlat Zadran; Yamin Ahmadzai; Nawaz Khan; Afsar Zazai; Hashmatullah Shaidi	Sultan Ahmed (c); Aamir Kaleem; Aaqib Sulehri; Adnan Ilyas; Amir Ali; Munis Ansari; Bilal Khan; Jatinder Singh; Swapnil Khadye; Khawar Ali; Ajay Lalcheta; Mehran Khan; Moonamchery Michal; Mohammad Nadeem; Rajeshkumar Ranpura; Sufyan Mehmood; Vaibhav Wategaonkar; Yousuf Al Balushi; Zeeshan Maqsood; Zeeshan Siddiqui

== Tour match ==
=== Three-day: United Arab Emirates v Oman ===
16 – 18 November 2015
Scorecard

Afghanistan	v	Oman
393 (113.2 overs); Noor Ali Zadran 113 (202); Khawar Ali 3/64 (20.2 overs)		178 (66.5 overs); Jatinder Singh 42 (46); Samiullah Shinwari 6/64 (25 overs)
204/5d (50 overs); Samiullah Shinwari 62* (47); Ajay Lalcheta 4/41 (19 overs)		193/6 (53 overs); Adnan Ilyas 107 (155); Yamin Ahmadzai 3/22 (8 overs)

Match drawn
Ajman Oval Ground, Ajman
Umpires: Iftikhar Ali (UAE) and Rabiul Hoque (UAE)

- Afghanistan won the toss and elected to bat.
- 12 players per side (11 batting, 11 fielding).

== T20I series ==
=== 1st T20I ===
29 November 2015
10:00
Scorecard

Afghanistan; 159/8 (20 overs)	v	Oman; 132 (18.1 overs)
Usman Ghani 69 (54); Mehran Khan 3/30 (3 overs)		Adnan Ilyas 34 (31); Sayed Shirzad 3/16 (3 overs)

Afghanistan won by 27 runs
Sheikh Zayed Cricket Stadium, Abu Dhabi
Umpires: Buddhi Pradhan (Nep) and Raveendra Wimalasiri (SL)

- Oman won the toss and elected to field.
- Sayed Shirzad and Yamin Ahmadzai (Afg) both made their T20I debuts.

=== 2nd T20I ===
30 November 2015
10:00
Scorecard

Afghanistan; 160/4 (20 overs)	v	Oman; 148/8 (20 overs)
Mohammad Shahzad 60 (46); Zeeshan Maqsood 2/20 (4 overs)		Khawar Ali 38 (40); Yamin Ahmadzai 3/34 (4 overs)

Afghanistan won by 12 runs
Sheikh Zayed Cricket Stadium, Abu Dhabi
Umpires: Buddhi Pradhan (Nep) and Raveendra Wimalasiri (SL)

- Oman won the toss and elected to field.
