= Rajiv Gandhi International Cricket Stadium, Dehradun =

Cricket Stadium Dehradun, Uttarakhand, India

Rajiv Gandhi International Cricket Stadium
- Dehradun Cricket Stadium
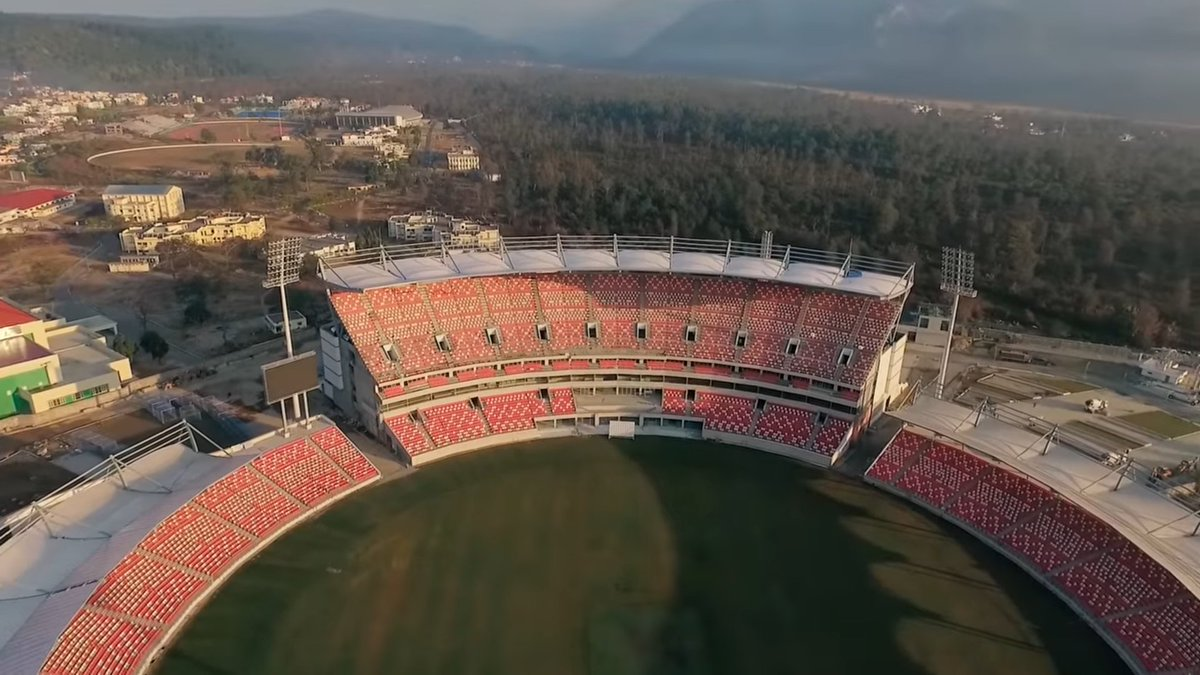
- Interactive map of Rajiv Gandhi International Cricket Stadium

Ground information
- Location: Dehradun, Uttarakhand, India
- Country: India
- Coordinates: 30°17′49″N 78°06′20″E
- Establishment: 16 December 2016
- Capacity: 25,000
- Owner: Government of Uttarakhand
- Architect: Collage Design, Mumbai
- Contractor: Shapoorji Pallonji Group
- Operator: Cricket Association of Uttarakhand
- Tenants: Uttarakhand cricket team (2018–present); Afghanistan cricket team (2013–2019)
- Website: dehradunstadium.blogspot.in
- End names
- Pavilion End; Southern End

International information
- Only men's Test: 15–18 March 2019: Afghanistan v Ireland
- First men's ODI: 28 February 2019: Afghanistan v Ireland
- Last men's ODI: 10 March 2019: Afghanistan v Ireland
- First men's T20I: 3 June 2018: Afghanistan v Bangladesh
- Last men's T20I: 24 February 2019: Afghanistan v Ireland
- As of 18 March 2019; Source: ESPNcricinfo

Rajiv Gandhi International Cricket Stadium, colloquially known as Dehradun Cricket Stadium is a cricket stadium in Dehradun, Uttarakhand in India. It is the home ground of Uttarakhand cricket team.

It is the first international standard stadium in the Uttarakhand state and was constructed in amount of 234 cr. In 2018 this arena hosted its first ICC cricket match. Rajiv Gandhi International Stadium is India's 21st venue to host T20 internationals, and the 51st Indian international cricket venue.

It is named after former prime minister of India Rajiv Gandhi.

== History ==
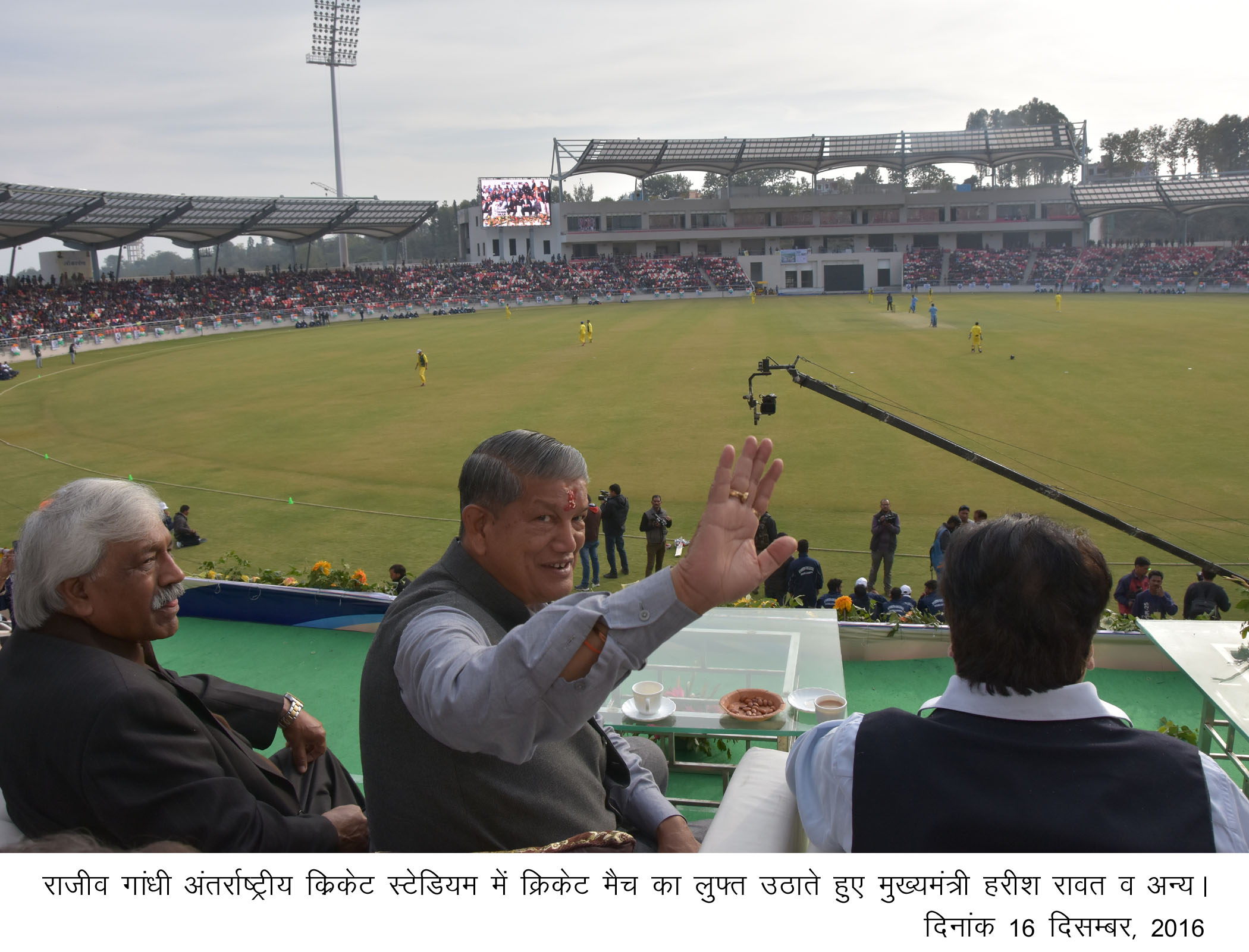
Chief Minister of Uttarakhand Harish Rawat with Sports Minister of Uttarakhand Dinesh Agrawal (left) and IPL Chairman Rajeev Shukla (right) at the inauguration of Rajiv Gandhi International Cricket Stadium in Dehradun.

With the formation of the state in the year 2000, the state suffered a blow to its sport facilities as Uttar Pradesh had the entire infrastructure for sports and Uttarakhand had hosted very few Ranji Trophy matches. Due to the lack of infrastructure, players started moving to different states.

Due to lack of infrastructure facilities, state was not given affiliation by the Board of Control for Cricket in India to make its team to complete in Ranji Trophy and other domestic tournaments. This was a major drawback for the young cricketers in Uttarakhand who started seeking cricketing opportunities from other states.

In November 2012, the Chief Minister of Uttarakhand, Vijay Bahuguna, laid the foundation of the stadium. On 16 December 2016, Chief Minister Harish Rawat inaugurated the stadium along with Rajeev Shukla, Chairperson of the Indian Premier League. The total cost of stadium was ₹237.20 crore.

The first match was played between Uttar Pradesh and Uttarakhand cricket team. International players such as Piyush Chawla and Suresh Raina etc was in the attendance.

In 2016, The Great Khali organised a professional wrestling event inside this stadium, which also featured foreign professional wrestlers.

The stadium was selected as the second home ground for the Afghanistan cricket team in India. In 2018 this arena hosted its first international match, when Afghanistan played against Bangladesh in T20I here.

The stadium suffered from lack of maintenance from the Uttarakhand government, due to deprivation of big matches and high cost to run it. The state government decided to out source private company to maintain it and rolled out tender.

The stadium hosted its inaugural ODI and Test match during series of Ireland against Afghanistan in India.

== Architecture and facilities ==
The stadium is located in the Raipur area of Dehradun and has a seating capacity of 25,000 people, along with floodlights facility for conducting day-night matches. The seats inside the stadium have been arranged in a manner that it gives a look of Aipan art, a traditional Kumaoni art. It is the first international standards cricket stadium in Uttarakhand state. The arena is built according to international standards, it has modern facilities such as corporate boxes, swimming pool, billiards room, gymnasium and club house. It is built on 23 acres land.

== Franchise cricket ==
- The matches of Road Safety World Series league held in this stadium in September 2022. Former cricketers such as Sachin Tendulkar, Brian Lara, Suresh Raina etc. played here.
- The matches of Legends League Cricket league held in this stadium in November 2023. Former cricketers such as Irfan Pathan, Gautam Gambhir, Harbhajan Singh, Mohammad Kaif, Suresh Raina, Martin Guptill etc. played here.

== List of centuries ==
=== Key ===
- * denotes that the batsman was not out.
- Inns. denotes the number of the innings in the match.
- Balls denotes the number of balls faced in an innings.
- NR denotes that the number of balls was not recorded.
- Parentheses next to the player's score denotes his century number at Edgbaston.
- The column title Date refers to the date the match started.
- The column title Result refers to the player's team result

=== ODIs ===
No.	Score	Player	Team	Balls	Inns.	Opposing team	Date	Winning team
1	104	Najibullah Zadran	Afghanistan	98	1	Ireland	5 March 2019	Lost
2	145*	Andrew Balbirnie	Ireland	136	2	Afghanistan	5 March 2019	Won

=== T20Is ===
No.	Score	Player	Team	Balls	Inns.	Opposing team	Date	Winning team
1	162*	Hazratullah Zazai	Afghanistan	62	1	Ireland	23 February 2019	Won

== List of five-wicket hauls ==
=== Key ===
Symbol	Meaning
†	The bowler was man of the match
‡	10 or more wickets taken in the match
§	One of two five-wicket hauls by the bowler in the match
Date	Day the Test started or ODI was held
Inn	Innings in which five-wicket haul was taken
Overs	Number of overs bowled.
Runs	Number of runs conceded
Wkts	Number of wickets taken
Econ	Runs conceded per over
Batsmen	Batsmen whose wickets were taken
Drawn	The match was drawn.

=== Tests ===
No.	Bowler	Date	Team	Opposing team	Inn	Overs	Runs	Wkts	Econ	Batsmen	Result
1	Rashid Khan	15 March 2019	Afghanistan	Ireland	3	34	82	5	2.41	James McCollum; Stuart Thompson; George Dockrell; Kevin O'Brien; Andy McBrine	Won

=== T20Is ===
Five-wicket hauls in T20Is at Rajiv Gandhi International Stadium, Dehradun
No.	Bowler	Date	Team	Opposing Team	Inn	Overs	Runs	Wkts	Econ	Batsmen	Result
1	Rashid Khan	24 February 2019	Afghanistan	Ireland	2	4	27	5	6.75	Kevin O'Brien; George Dockrell; Shane Getkate; Simi Singh; Joshua Little	Won

== See also ==
• Indira Gandhi International Sports Stadium, another cricket stadium situated in Uttarakhand's Haldwani.
