= Irish cricket team against Afghanistan in India in 2016–17 =

International cricket tour

	Afghanistan	Ireland
- Dates: 8 – 31 March 2017
Captains	Asghar Stanikzai	William Porterfield

One Day International series
- Results: Afghanistan won the 5-match series 3–2
Most runs	Rahmat Shah (262)	Paul Stirling (341)
Most wickets	Rashid Khan (16)	Kevin O'Brien (7)
- Player of the series: Paul Stirling (Ire)

Twenty20 International series
- Results: Afghanistan won the 3-match series 3–0
Most runs	Mohammad Nabi (124)	Stuart Thompson (104)
Most wickets	Rashid Khan (9)	Kevin O'Brien (5)
- Player of the series: Rashid Khan (Afg)

The Ireland cricket team toured India during March 2017 to play five One Day Internationals (ODIs), three Twenty20 International (T20Is) and an ICC Intercontinental Cup match against Afghanistan. All the matches were played at the Greater Noida Sports Complex Ground, Greater Noida, in the state of Uttar Pradesh. Afghanistan won the T20I series 3–0 and the ODI series 3–2. Afghanistan also won the ICC Intercontinental Cup match, by an innings and 172 runs.

== Squads ==
T20Is		ODIs	
Afghanistan	Ireland	Afghanistan	Ireland
Asghar Stanikzai (c); Fareed Ahmad; Amir Hamza; Karim Janat; Rashid Khan; Mohammad Nabi; Gulbadin Naib; Naveen-ul-Haq; Shafiqullah; Mohammad Shahzad (wk); Samiullah Shinwari; Najeeb Tarakai; Dawlat Zadran; Najibullah Zadran; Shapoor Zadran	William Porterfield (c); Peter Chase; George Dockrell; ~~Josh Little~~; Jacob Mulder; Andrew McBrine; Barry McCarthy; Kevin O'Brien; ~~Boyd Rankin~~; Paul Stirling; Greg Thompson; Stuart Thompson; Lorcan Tucker; Gary Wilson (wk); Craig Young	Asghar Stanikzai (c); Aftab Alam; Fareed Ahmad; Amir Hamza; Ihsanullah; Karim Janat; Rashid Khan; Mohammad Nabi; Gulbadin Naib; Shafiqullah; Rahmat Shah; Hashmatullah Shahidi; Mohammad Shahzad (wk); Samiullah Shinwari; Noor Ali Zadran; Dawlat Zadran; Najibullah Zadran	William Porterfield (c); Andrew Balbirnie; Peter Chase; George Dockrell; Ed Joyce; Jacob Mulder; Tim Murtagh; Andrew McBrine; Barry McCarthy; Tim Murtagh; Kevin O'Brien; Niall O'Brien; ~~Boyd Rankin~~; Paul Stirling; Stuart Thompson; Gary Wilson (wk); Craig Young

Ireland's Josh Little pulled out of the tour because of education commitments. Peter Chase was named as his replacement. Boyd Rankin was ruled out of Ireland's T20I matches with a back injury. He was not fit to play in the ODI series, as he was still recovering from a lower back injury, with Tim Murtagh added to the squad as cover. Rankin was later ruled out of the ODI series, with Peter Chase named as cover for him.

== T20I series ==
=== 1st T20I ===
8 March 2017
Scorecard

Ireland; 165/5 (20 overs)	v	Afghanistan; 171/4 (18 overs)
Stuart Thompson 56 (35); Amir Hamza 2/23 (4 overs)		Samiullah Shinwari 56 (36); Stuart Thompson 1/17 (3 overs)

Afghanistan won by 6 wickets
Greater Noida Sports Complex Ground, Greater Noida
Umpires: Ahmed Shah Durrani (Afg) and Ahmed Shah Pakteen (Afg)
Player of the match: Samiullah Shinwari (Afg)

- Ireland won the toss and elected to bat.
- The venue hosted its first international cricket match.
- Afghanistan recorded the most consecutive victories in T20Is (9).

=== 2nd T20I ===
10 March 2017
Scorecard

Afghanistan; 184/8 (20 overs)	v	Ireland; 93/9 (11 overs)
Najeeb Tarakai 90 (58); Barry McCarthy 4/33 (4 overs)		Paul Stirling 34 (15); Rashid Khan 5/3 (2 overs)

Afghanistan won by 17 runs (DLS method)
Greater Noida Sports Complex Ground, Greater Noida
Umpires: Ahmed Shah Durrani (Afg) and Ahmed Shah Pakteen (Afg)
Player of the match: Najeeb Tarakai and Rashid Khan (Afg)

- Afghanistan won the toss and elected to bat.
- Rain stopped play after 6.1 overs of Ireland's innings, with Ireland set a revised target of 111 to win in 11 overs.
- Barry McCarthy (Ire) made his T20I debut.
- Rashid Khan (Afg) took his first five-wicket haul in a T20I, and became the first player to take one in two overs.

=== 3rd T20I ===
12 March 2017
Scorecard

Afghanistan; 233/8 (20 overs)	v	Ireland; 205 (19.2 overs)
Mohammad Nabi 89 (30); Kevin O'Brien 4/45 (4 overs)		Gary Wilson 59 (34); Rashid Khan 3/28 (4 overs)

Afghanistan won by 28 runs
Greater Noida Sports Complex Ground, Greater Noida
Umpires: Ahmed Shah Durrani (Afg) and Ahmed Shah Pakteen (Afg)
Player of the match: Mohammad Nabi (Afg)

- Ireland won the toss and elected to field.
- Mohammad Nabi scored the fastest fifty by an Afghan player in a T20I (21 balls).
- Mohammad Nabi also hit the most sixes in a T20I innings by an Afghan Player (9) and made the highest score by a batsman batting at number 6 or lower in a T20I.
- This was the highest total by Afghanistan in a T20I.
- Barry McCarthy's (Ire) bowling figures were the most expensive bowling figures in a T20I.
- William Porterfield passed 1,000 runs in T20Is and became the first player for Ireland to do so.
- This was the highest total by Ireland in the second innings of a T20I.
- This was Afghanistan's 11th straight win in T20Is, the longest winning streak by any team in T20Is.

== ODI series ==
=== 1st ODI ===
15 March 2017
Scorecard

Afghanistan; 292/7 (50 overs)	v	Ireland; 262 (46.5 overs)
Rahmat Shah 78 (92); Kevin O'Brien 3/47 (10 overs)		William Porterfield 119 (98); Rashid Khan 4/48 (9 overs)

Afghanistan won by 30 runs
Greater Noida Sports Complex Ground, Greater Noida
Umpires: Ahmed Shah Pakteen (Afg) and Nitin Menon (Ind)
Player of the match: William Porterfield (Ire)

- Afghanistan won the toss and elected to bat.
- This was the first ODI to be played at this venue.
- Ahmed Shah Pakteen (Afg) and Nitin Menon (Ind) both stood in their first ODI match as umpires.

=== 2nd ODI ===
17 March 2017
Scorecard

Afghanistan; 338 (50 overs)	v	Ireland; 304 (47.3 overs)
Asghar Stanikzai 101 (126); Paul Stirling 6/55 (10 overs)		Paul Stirling 95 (80); Rashid Khan 6/43 (9.3 overs)

Afghanistan won by 34 runs
Greater Noida Sports Complex Ground, Greater Noida
Umpires: Ahmed Shah Durrani (Afg) and Anil Chaudhary (Ind)
Player of the match: Paul Stirling (Ire)

- Afghanistan won the toss and elected to bat.
- Ahmed Shah Durrani (Afg) stood in his first ODI as an umpire.
- Asghar Stanikzai (Afg) scored his first century in an ODI and was the first hundred by an Afghanistan captain in ODIs.
- Afghanistan made their highest total in an ODI.
- Paul Stirling (Ire) took his first five wicket haul in an ODI and recorded the best bowling figure by a bowler for Ireland in ODIs.
- Rashid Khan (Afg) took his first five wicket haul in an ODI and recorded the best bowling figure by a bowler for Afghanistan in ODIs.
- This was the first time in an ODI that two different bowlers each took six wickets in a match.

=== 3rd ODI ===
19 March 2017
Scorecard

Afghanistan; 264/8 (50 overs)	v	Ireland; 265/4 (48.3 overs)
Rashid Khan 56 (50); Tim Murtagh 2/49 (10 overs)		Paul Stirling 99 (114); Dawlat Zadran 2/52 (9.3 overs)

Ireland won by 6 wickets
Greater Noida Sports Complex Ground, Greater Noida
Umpires: Ahmed Shah Pakteen (Afg) and Nitin Menon (Ind)
Player of the match: Paul Stirling (Ire)

- Afghanistan won the toss and elected to bat.

=== 4th ODI ===
22 March 2017
Scorecard

Afghanistan; 220 (49.5 overs)	v	Ireland; 224/7 (46.5 overs)
Shafiqullah 42 (42); Kevin O'Brien 4/26 (7 overs)		Kevin O'Brien 72* (60); Mohammad Nabi 4/30 (9 overs)

Ireland won by 3 wickets
Greater Noida Sports Complex Ground, Greater Noida
Umpires: Ahmed Shah Durrani (Afg) and Anil Chaudhary (Ind)
Player of the match: Kevin O'Brien (Ire)

- Afghanistan won the toss and elected to bat.

=== 5th ODI ===
24 March 2017
Scorecard

Ireland; 229 (48.1 overs)	v	Afghanistan; 231/3 (48.4 overs)
Paul Stirling 51 (60); Rashid Khan 4/29 (10 overs)		Rahmat Shah 108* (128); Tim Murtagh 1/36 (9 overs)

Afghanistan won by 7 wickets
Greater Noida Sports Complex Ground, Greater Noida
Umpires: Ahmed Shah Pakteen (Afg) and Nitin Menon (Ind)
Player of the match: Rahmat Shah (Afg)

- Ireland won the toss and elected to bat.
- Najeeb Tarakai (Afg) made his ODI debut.
