= Sayed Shirzad =

Afghan cricketer (born 1994)

Personal information
- Full name: Sayed Ahmed Shirzad
- Born: 1 October 1994 (age 32); Nangarhar, Afghanistan
- Nickname: Shiroo
- Height: 5 ft 8 in (1.73 m)
- Batting: Right-handed
- Bowling: Left-arm medium
- Role: Bowler

International information
- National side: Afghanistan (2015–2021)
- Only Test (cap 23): 10 March 2021 v Zimbabwe
- ODI debut (cap 46): 2 March 2019 v Ireland
- Last ODI: 4 July 2019 v West Indies
- T20I debut (cap 31): 29 November 2015 v Oman
- Last T20I: 24 February 2019 v Ireland
- T20I shirt no.: 47

Domestic team information
- Years: Team
- 2011/12: Afghan Cheetahs

Career statistics
Competition	Test	ODI	T20I	FC
Matches	1	2	4	26
Runs scored	–	25	1	195
Batting average	–	25.00	1.00	6.50
100s/50s	–/–	0/0	0/0	0/0
Top score	–	25	1	30
Balls bowled	252	48	90	3,451
Wickets	3	1	7	71
Bowling average	32.33	56.00	16.57	31.63
5 wickets in innings	0	0	0	4
10 wickets in match	0	0	0	1
Best bowling	2/48	1/56	3/16	6/45
Catches/stumpings	0/–	0/–	1/–	10/–
Medal record
Representing Afghanistan
Men's Cricket
Asian Games
Silver medal – second place	2022 Hangzhou	Team
- Source: Cricinfo, 19 July 2026

Sayed Shirzad (born 1 October 1994) is an Afghan cricketer. Shirzad is a right-handed batsman who bowls left-arm at a medium pace.

== Domestic career ==
Shirzad represented Afghanistan Under-19s in the 2011 Under-19 World Cup Qualifier in Ireland. He made his Twenty20 debut for the Afghan Cheetahs against Rawalpindi Rams in the Faysal Bank Twenty-20 Cup in Pakistan. He bowled two wicket-less overs in the match, and was not required to bat.

He made his List A debut for Boost Region in the 2018 Ghazi Amanullah Khan Regional One Day Tournament on 11 July 2018. He was the leading wicket-taker for Boost Region during the tournament, with twelve dismissals in six matches.

== T20 franchise career ==
In September 2018, he was named in Kandahar's squad in the first edition of the Afghanistan Premier League tournament. He was the leading wicket-taker for the Kandahar Knights in the tournament, with sixteen dismissals in eight matches.

== International career ==
He made his Twenty20 International debut against Oman on 29 November 2015.

In May 2018, he was named in Afghanistan's squad for their inaugural Test match, played against India, but he was not selected for the match.

In July 2018, he was named in Afghanistan's One Day International (ODI) squad for their series against Ireland, but he did not play. In September 2018, he was named in Afghanistan's ODI squad for the 2018 Asia Cup, but he did not play.

In February 2019, he was named in Afghanistan's One Day International (ODI) squad for their series against Ireland in India. He made his ODI debut against Ireland on 2 March 2019. Following the conclusion of the ODI series, he was added to Afghanistan's Test squad, for the one-off match against Ireland, but he did not play.

On 27 June 2019, Sayed was added to Afghanistan's squad for the 2019 Cricket World Cup, replacing Aftab Alam, who was ruled out of the tournament due to "exceptional circumstances". In August 2019, he was named in Afghanistan's Test squad for their one-off match against Bangladesh, but he did not play. In February 2021, he was named in Afghanistan's Test squad for their series against Zimbabwe. He made his Test debut for Afghanistan, against Zimbabwe, on 10 March 2021.
