= Ahmed Shah Pakteen =

Afghan cricket umpire (born 1977)

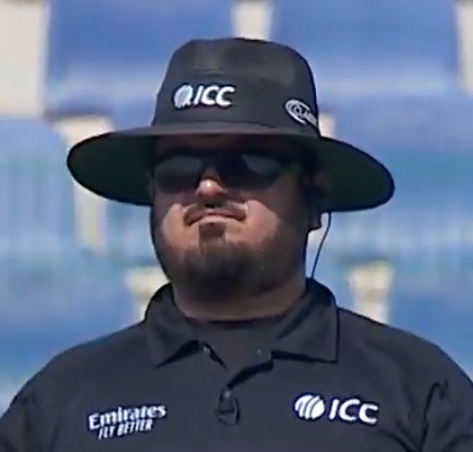
- Pakteen in 2021

Personal information
- Full name: Ahmed Shah Pakteen
- Born: 1 January 1977 (age 49); Herat, Afghanistan

Umpiring information
- Tests umpired: 2 (2021)
- ODIs umpired: 40 (2017–2025)
- T20Is umpired: 36 (2017–2026)
- WODIs umpired: 4 (2022)
- WT20Is umpired: 6 (2018)
- Source: ESPNcricinfo, 24 June 2023

Ahmed Shah Pakteen (born 1 January 1977) is a cricket umpire from Afghanistan. He is currently a member of International Panel of ICC Umpires. Pakteen has stood in matches in the 2015–17 ICC Intercontinental Cup.

On 14 January 2017 he made his Twenty20 International umpiring debut, in a match between Scotland and Hong Kong, in the 2017 Desert T20 Challenge. He stood in his first One Day International (ODI) match between Afghanistan and Ireland on 15 March 2017.

He was one of the twelve umpires to officiate matches in the 2019 ICC T20 World Cup Qualifier tournament in the United Arab Emirates. In January 2020, he was named as one of the sixteen umpires for the 2020 Under-19 Cricket World Cup tournament in South Africa.

In February 2021, he was named as one of the two on-field umpires for the two-Test series between Afghanistan and Zimbabwe, becoming the first Afghan umpire to officiate in Test cricket. He stood in his first Test match, between Afghanistan and Zimbabwe, on 2 March 2021.

In February 2022, he was named as one of the on-field umpires for the 2022 Women's Cricket World Cup in New Zealand. In January 2023, he was named as one of the on-field umpires for the 2023 ICC Under-19 Women's T20 World Cup.

== See also ==
- List of Test cricket umpires
- List of One Day International cricket umpires
- List of Twenty20 International cricket umpires
