= Hazratullah Zazai =

Afghan cricketer

Personal information
- Born: 23 March 1998 (age 28); Paktia, Afghanistan
- Batting: Left-handed
- Bowling: Slow left-arm orthodox
- Role: Opening batter

International information
- National side: Afghanistan (2016–present)
- ODI debut (cap 44): 27 August 2018 v Ireland
- Last ODI: 11 November 2019 v West Indies
- ODI shirt no.: 3
- T20I debut (cap 35): 16 December 2016 v United Arab Emirates
- Last T20I: 11 December 2024 v Zimbabwe
- T20I shirt no.: 3

Domestic team information
- Years: Team
- 2017–present: Amo Sharks
- 2018–present: Kabul Zwanan
- 2019: Dhaka Dynamites
- 2019–20: Rajshahi Royals
- 2020: Galle Gladiators
- 2021: Peshawar Zalmi
- 2025/26: Sylhet Titans

Career statistics
Competition	ODI	T20I	FC	LA
Matches	16	33	17	32
Runs scored	361	960	1,246	739
Batting average	22.56	32.00	38.93	23.83
100s/50s	0/2	1/3	3/8	1/3
Top score	67	162*	133	103*
Balls bowled	–	–	82	–
Wickets	–	–	3	–
Bowling average	–	–	22.66	–
5 wickets in innings	–	–	0	–
10 wickets in match	–	–	0	–
Best bowling	–	–	1/10	–
Catches/stumpings	3/–	5/–	22/–	10/–
- Source: Cricinfo, 18 February 2023

Hazratullah Zazai (Pashto: حضرت الله ځاځی; born 23 March 1998) is an Afghan cricketer. He made his international debut for the Afghanistan cricket team in December 2016. In February 2019, he scored an unbeaten 162 runs off 62 balls against Ireland, which is the highest individual score by an Afghan batsman in a Twenty20 International.

== Domestic and T20 franchise career ==
He made his List A debut for Amo Region in the 2017 Ghazi Amanullah Khan Regional One Day Tournament on 10 August 2017. He made his first-class debut for Band-e-Amir Region in the 2017–18 Ahmad Shah Abdali 4-day Tournament on 20 October 2017.

In September 2018, he was named in Kabul Zwanan's squad in the first edition of the Afghanistan Premier League tournament. On 14 October 2018, in the match against Balkh Legends, Zazai hit six sixes in one over. In the process, Zazai also equalled the record for the fastest fifty in Twenty20 cricket, from twelve balls. He was the leading run-scorer for Kabul Zwanan in the tournament, with 322 runs in ten matches.

In October 2018, he was named in the squad for the Dhaka Dynamites team, following the draft for the 2018–19 Bangladesh Premier League. In November 2019, he was selected to play for the Rajshahi Royals in the 2019–20 Bangladesh Premier League. In October 2020, he was drafted by the Galle Gladiators for the inaugural edition of the Lanka Premier League.

== International career ==
He made his Twenty20 International (T20I) debut against the United Arab Emirates on 16 December 2016. He made his One Day International (ODI) debut against Ireland on 27 August 2018.

In August 2018, against Ireland, he scored the fastest T20I fifty by an Afghan cricketer, in 22 balls. In February 2019, in the second T20I match against Ireland, he scored 162 not out, his first century in a T20I match. It was the highest score for an Afghan batsman in a T20I match, and the second highest score overall, behind Aaron Finch's 172. His innings included a record 16 sixes, and his first-wicket partnership with Usman Ghani was also a record for any wicket in a T20I, with 236 runs scored. Afghanistan finished their innings with 278 runs for the loss of three wickets, the highest total in a T20I match.

In April 2019, he was named in Afghanistan's squad for the 2019 Cricket World Cup. In September 2021, he was named in Afghanistan's squad for the 2021 ICC Men's T20 World Cup.

In May 2024, he was named as a reserve player in Afghanistan's squad for the 2024 ICC Men's T20 World Cup tournament.
