= Rashid Khan =

Afghan cricketer (born 1998)

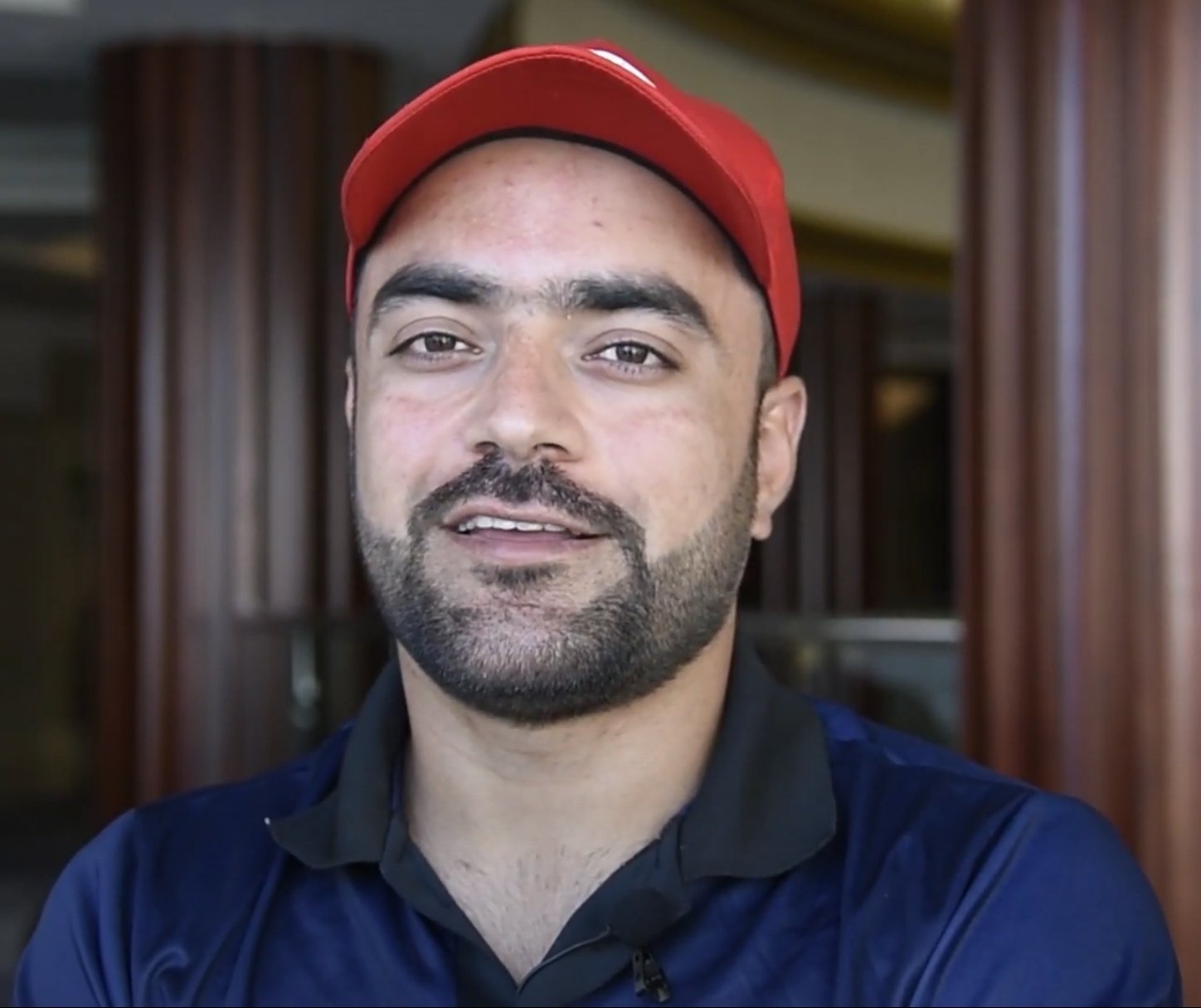
- Khan in 2021

Personal information
- Full name: Rashid Khan Arman
- Born: 20 September 1998 (age 28); Nangarhar Province, Afghanistan
- Height: 5 ft 9 in (1.75 m)
- Batting: Right-handed
- Bowling: Leg break googly
- Role: Bowling All-rounder

International information
- National side: Afghanistan (2015–present)
- Test debut (cap 9): 14 June 2018 v India
- Last Test: 2 January 2025 v Zimbabwe
- ODI debut (cap 36): 18 October 2015 v Zimbabwe
- Last ODI: 12 August 2026 v Ireland
- ODI shirt no.: 19
- T20I debut (cap 27): 26 October 2015 v Zimbabwe
- Last T20I: 19 February 2026 v Canada
- T20I shirt no.: 19

Domestic team information
- Years: Team
- 2016–2017: Comilla Victorians
- 2017–2021: Sunrisers Hyderabad
- 2017: Guyana Amazon Warriors
- 2017–present: Band-e-Amir Dragons
- 2017/18–2022/23: Adelaide Strikers (squad no. 19)
- 2018–2019, 2021–2022: Sussex (squad no. 1)
- 2018: Kabul Zwanan
- 2018: Durban Heat
- 2020: Barbados Royals
- 2021–2023: Lahore Qalandars
- 2022-present: Trent Rockets
- 2022–present: Gujarat Titans
- 2023: St Kitts & Nevis Patriots
- 2023–present: MI Cape Town
- 2023-2024: MI New York
- 2023; 2025: MI Emirates
- 2025–present: MI London

Career statistics
Competition	Test	ODI	T20I	T20
Matches	6	123	115	547
Runs scored	154	1,469	622	3,012
Batting average	17.11	18.83	14.80	13.94
100s/50s	0/1	0/5	0/0	0/5
Top score	51	60*	48*	79*
Balls bowled	1,864	6,174	2,630	12,391
Wickets	45	230	193	736
Bowling average	20.44	19.43	13.73	18.72
5 wickets in innings	5	7	2	5
10 wickets in match	3	0	0	0
Best bowling	7/66	7/18	5/3	6/17
Catches/stumpings	0/–	38/–	45/–	194/–
- Source: ESPNcricinfo, 15 August 2026

Rashid Khan Arman (Pashto: راشد خان ارمان) (born 20 September 1998) is an Afghan international cricketer and captain of the Afghanistan national team in the T20I format. In franchise leagues, he plays for Gujarat Titans in the Indian Premier League (IPL), Adelaide Strikers in Australia's Big Bash League (BBL), Lahore Qalandars in the Pakistan Super League (PSL), Band-e-Amir Dragons in Afghanistan's Shpageeza Cricket League and MI New York in Major League Cricket (MLC). He bowls right-arm leg spin and is an aggressive right-handed batsman.

He was one of the eleven cricketers to play in Afghanistan's first Test match, against India, in June 2018. He returned the most expensive bowling figures by a debutant (154 runs for 2 wickets in 34.3 overs) in a nation's maiden Test match. In September 2019, he led the team in the one-off Test against Bangladesh, and at the age of 20 years and 350 days, became the youngest cricketer to captain a Test match team.

In June 2017, he took the best bowling figures (7 wickets for 18 runs) for an associate nation in a One Day International (ODI) match. In February 2018, he became the youngest player to top the ICC Player Rankings for bowlers in ODIs. Later the same month, he also topped the ICC Player Rankings for bowlers in T20Is. In September 2018, he became the number one player in the ICC's all-rounder rankings, following his performance at the 2018 Asia Cup.

In March 2018, during the 2018 Cricket World Cup Qualifier, he captained Afghanistan for the first time in an ODI match. At the age of 19 years and 165 days, he became the youngest player to captain an international team. In the final of the Cricket World Cup Qualifier, against the West Indies, Khan became the fastest and youngest bowler to take 100 wickets in ODIs when he dismissed Shai Hope. He took 44 matches to take his 100th dismissal, breaking the previous record of 52 matches, set by Mitchell Starc of Australia. In June 2018, he became the fastest bowler, in terms of time, to take 50 wickets in T20Is. He reached the milestone in two years and 220 days, in the first T20I against Bangladesh. In October 2021, he also became the fastest bowler, in terms of matches, to take 100 wickets in T20I cricket, in his 53rd match.

In April 2019, the Afghanistan Cricket Board (ACB) named Khan as the team's new T20I captain, replacing Asghar Afghan. Khan was also appointed as the vice-captain of the ODI squad. In June 2019, during the 2019 Cricket World Cup, Khan played in his 100th international cricket match for Afghanistan. Following the World Cup, Khan was appointed as captain of the Afghanistan cricket team across all formats. However, in December 2019, the ACB reappointed Asghar Afghan as the captain of the Afghanistan cricket team across all formats. In 2017 Rashid Khan won Associate Cricketer of the Year award and also in December 2020, Rashid Khan was named the ICC Men's T20I Cricketer of the Decade.

== Early life and education ==
Rashid Khan was born in 1998 in a Shinwari Pashtun family in Nangarhar, Eastern Afghanistan. His family, including ten siblings, hails from Jalalabad and owned a tyre business in Nangarhar until the Afghan war. Rashid's family fled the war and lived in Pakistan for a few years.

Rashid grew up playing cricket with his brothers and idolised Pakistani all-rounder Shahid Afridi, after whom he stylised his bowling action and South African batsman AB de Villiers. Although initially more proficient as a batsman, he later excelled in leg-spin bowling.

Rashid attended the Islamia College Peshawar, where he studied computer science until 2013, having gained admission due to his sports skills. He came to prominence in 2014 when he performed notably in matches played in Peshawar when the Afghan cricket team toured Pakistan.

== Personal life ==
Rashid was married on 3 October 2024, in Kabul, sharing this special occasion with his three brothers, who also tied the knot on the same day. In accordance with Sharia law, he married again on 12 November 2025.

== International career ==
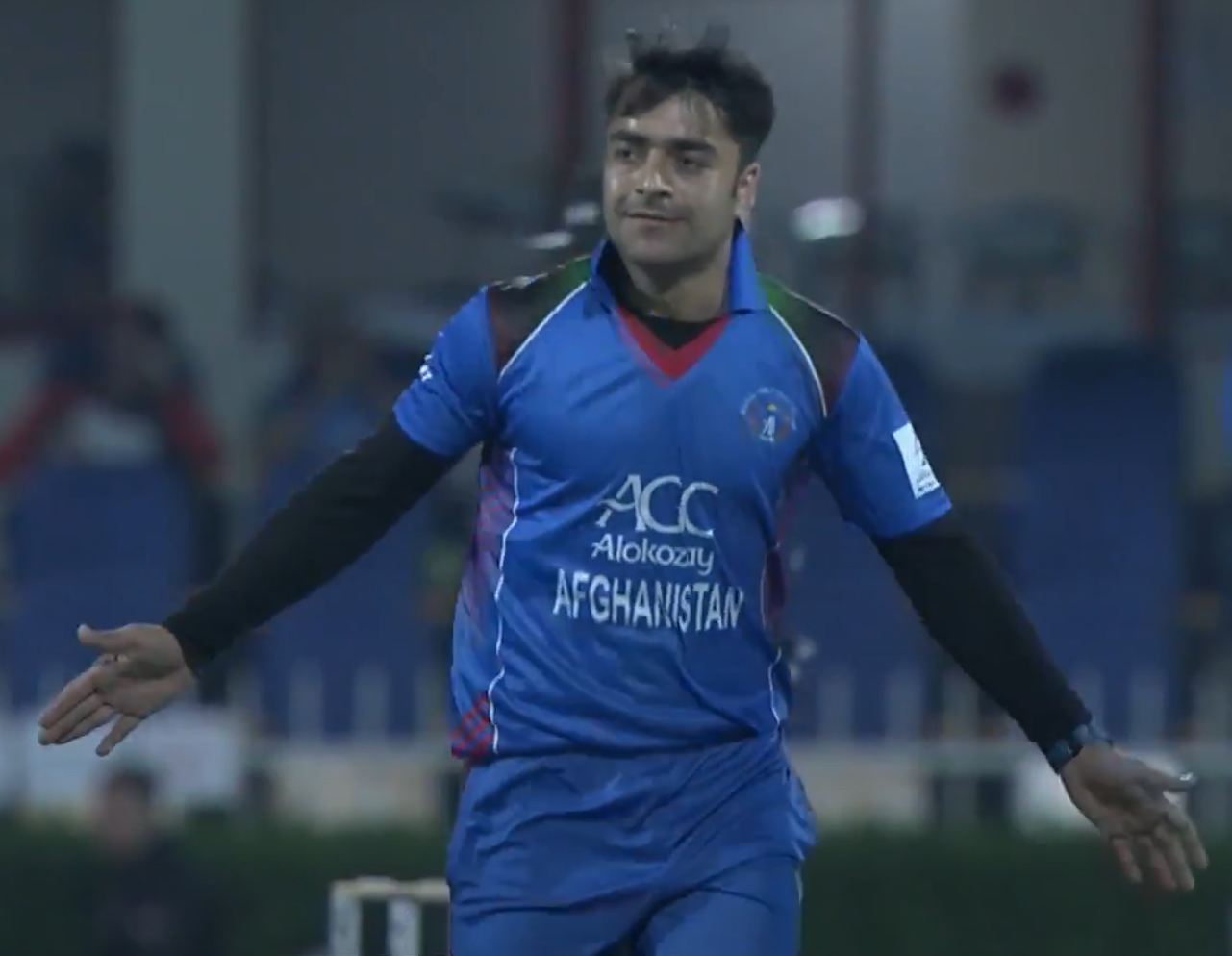
Khan in 2018

He made his One Day International (ODI) debut for Afghanistan against Zimbabwe on 18 October 2015. He made his Twenty20 International (T20I) debut, also against Zimbabwe, on 26 October.

On 10 March 2017, Khan took his maiden T20I five-wicket haul at the second T20I against Ireland. His figures of five wickets for three runs is the best bowling performance by an Afghan cricket in a T20I and the joint fourth-best figures in all T20Is. He became the first player to take a five-wicket haul in two overs in a T20I match. Afghanistan won the match and Rashid and Najeeb Tarakai shared the man of the match award.

In the ODI series against Ireland, along with Paul Stirling, they became the first pair of bowlers from different teams to each take six wickets in the same ODI.

On 9 June, he took his second ODI five-wicket haul, finishing with figures of 7 wickets for 18 runs against the West Indies at Gros Islet. It was the fourth best ODI bowling figures and first by an associate nation cricketer to take 7 wickets. Afghanistan defended its total of 212 runs and won the match by 63 runs, and Khan was adjudged man of the match.

In January 2018, the International Cricket Council (ICC) named him as the Associate Cricketer of the Year. The following month, he was named as the stand-in captain of the Afghanistan team for the 2018 Cricket World Cup Qualifier tournament, while Afghanistan's regular captain, Asghar Stanikzai, recovered from having his appendix removed. In February 2018, the ICC named Khan as one of the ten players to watch ahead of the 2018 Cricket World Cup Qualifier tournament.

In April 2018, he was named in the Rest of the World XI squad for the one-off T20I against the West Indies, which was played at Lord's on 31 May 2018. In February 2019, in the third T20I match against Ireland, he took a hat-trick and four wickets with four balls.

=== Test cricket ===
In May 2018, he was named in Afghanistan's squad for their inaugural Test match, played against India. He made his Test debut for Afghanistan, against India, on 14 June 2018. On his Test debut he conceded 154 runs in the first innings of the match, becoming the first bowler to concede more than 150 runs in their inaugural Test appearance of any player's country. Rashid's figures of 2 for 154 in the first innings was also the highest number of runs conceded by a bowler in a country's inaugural Test match, beating the previous record held by Amir Elahi, who conceded 134 runs during Pakistan's debut Test against India in 1952. During the Afghanistan's inaugural test match he along with Wafadar set a new record for becoming the first pair of teenagers to concede more than 100 runs each in a nation's inaugural Test match.

In February 2019, he was named in Afghanistan's Test squad for their one-off match against Ireland in India. In the second innings, he took five wickets for 82 runs, becoming the first bowler for Afghanistan to take a five-wicket haul in a Test match.

=== 2019 Cricket World Cup ===
In April 2019, he was named in Afghanistan's squad for the 2019 Cricket World Cup. The International Cricket Council (ICC) named him as one of the five exciting talents making their Cricket World Cup debut. On 1 June 2019, in Afghanistan's opening match against Australia, Khan played in his 100th international cricket match. This included one game with a World XI team in the Hurricane Relief T20 Challenge in May 2018. Three days later, against Sri Lanka, Khan played in his 100th international match for Afghanistan. On 18 June 2019, in the match against England, Rashid bowled the most expensive spell in a Cricket World Cup match, conceding 110 runs from his nine overs.

=== Captaincy and the T20I Cricket World Cup ===
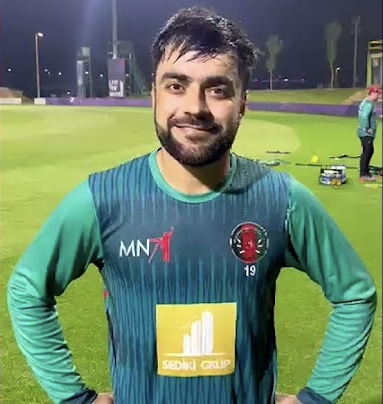
Khan in 2021

Following the 2019 Cricket World Cup, Rashid was appointed as captain of the Afghanistan cricket team across all three formats. His first Test match as captain was against Bangladesh in September 2019. Afghanistan won the match by 224 runs. Rashid Khan became the first bowler for Afghanistan to take a ten-wicket haul in Tests, and was the first cricketer to score a fifty and take a ten-wicket haul in his debut match as captain in a Test match. In December 2019, the Afghanistan Cricket Board reappointed Asghar Afghan as the national captain across all three formats.

In November 2020, Khan was nominated for the ICC Men's T20I Cricketer of the Decade award, winning the accolade the following month. In July 2021, Khan was again named the captain of Afghanistan's T20I team. In September 2021, Khan was named the captain of Afghanistan's squad for the 2021 ICC Men's T20 World Cup. However, after the squad was named, Khan stepped down as the team's captain, stating that the selection committee had not gained his consent for the team. On 7 November 2021, in Afghanistan's T20 World Cup match against New Zealand, Khan took his 400th wicket in Twenty20 cricket.

In December 2022, Rashid was once again appointed as captain of Afghanistan in T20I format, after Mohammad Nabi resigned from captaincy following the 2022 ICC Men's T20 World Cup.

In May 2024, he was named captain of Afghanistan's squad for the 2024 ICC Men's T20 World Cup tournament.

Rashid holds the record for the most wickets in Men's Twenty20 International cricket. He surpassed Tim Southee's previous record of 164 during a match against the United Arab Emirates in Sharjah on September 1, 2025.

== Domestic and T20 franchise career ==
On 7 December 2016 he made his first-class debut, for Afghanistan against the England Lions in Abu Dhabi, taking 4 for 48 and 8 for 74, and scoring 25 not out and 52.

He holds the record as the youngest to take 200 wickets in T20 cricket, achieving this milestone at 23 years and 119 days old.

=== Indian Premier League ===
In February 2017, he was bought by Sunrisers Hyderabad for the 2017 Indian Premier League (IPL) for ₹4 crore (A$620,000) (equivalent to A$824,430 in 2022). He was amongst the two first-ever Afghan players to be selected for the IPL, along with Mohammad Nabi.

He made his IPL debut in the opening fixture of the 2017 tournament, taking two wickets, as the Sunrisers Hyderabad won the match by 35 runs. He finished the tournament as the sixth-highest wicket-taker with 17 wickets from 14 matches.

On 5 May 2018, during the 2018 Indian Premier League, Khan played in his 100th Twenty20 match. He took two wickets, affected a run out, and was named the man of the match. In March 2022, he played as the vice-captain for the Gujarat Titans in IPL 2022.

On 9 April 2023, during the 2023 Indian Premier League, he took a hat-trick against Kolkata Knight Riders with figures of 3 for 37, becoming the fourth player to take a hat-trick in IPL history.

=== Caribbean Premier League ===
A month after getting selected in the IPL, he was bought by Guyana Amazon Warriors for $60,000 to play in the 2017 Caribbean Premier League (CPL). In September 2017, he took a hat-trick for Guyana Amazon Warriors, the first hat-trick in the history of the CPL.

In July 2020, he was named in the Barbados Tridents squad for the 2020 Caribbean Premier League. On 20 August 2020, in the match against the St Lucia Zouks, Khan took his 300th wicket in Twenty20 cricket. At the age of 21 years and 335 days, became the youngest bowler to take 300 wickets in T20 cricket. He also became the fastest to take 300 wickets in the format, doing so in 213 matches.

=== Big Bash League ===
In September 2017, he signed with Adelaide Strikers to play in the 2017–18 Big Bash League, he later went on to win the tournament. On 8 January 2020, in a match during BBL|09 against the Sydney Sixers, Rashid took the fifth hat-trick in the history of the BBL. Since joining the Strikers, he has cemented himself as a fan's favourite in Adelaide.

On 12 January 2022, in the 2021–22 Big Bash League season, Khan played in his 300th Twenty20 match. In the game he took six wickets for 17 runs, his career-best figures, and the third-best figures in the BBL.

=== Afghanistan Premier League ===
In September 2018, he was named as the Icon Player for Kabul Zwanan's squad in the first edition of the Afghanistan Premier League tournament. Despite being on the losing team in the final, he was named as the player of the tournament.

=== Pakistan Super League ===
In November 2017, he was selected to play for the Quetta Gladiators in 2018 Pakistan Super League players draft.

In October 2018, the Pakistan Super League (PSL) drafts revealed that Rashid Khan was included in the 14-men Platinum Category. For the 2021 edition of Pakistan Super League, he was named as the first Platinum Pick for the Lahore Qalandars and played his first match against Peshawar Zalmi.

=== Other tournaments ===
In October 2017, he was signed by Sussex County Cricket Club to play in the NatWest T20 Blast in England. During the first-ever player draft for The Hundred, Rashid was the first pick for the Trent Rockets, in the top price band (£125,000). In October 2018, he was named in Durban Heat's squad for the first edition of the Mzansi Super League T20 tournament. In July 2019, he was selected to play for the Rotterdam Rhinos in the inaugural edition of the Euro T20 Slam cricket tournament. However, the following month the tournament was cancelled. In December 2021, Khan was again signed by Sussex for the 2022 T20 Blast tournament in England. In April 2022, he was bought by the Trent Rockets for the 2022 season of The Hundred. In June 2023, he was signed by MI New York to play in the United States' Major League Cricket.
