= Usman Ghani =

Afghan cricketer

Personal information
- Born: 20 November 1996 (age 29); Khost, Afghanistan
- Batting: Right-handed
- Bowling: Right-arm off break
- Role: Opening batter

International information
- National side: Afghanistan (2014–present)
- ODI debut (cap 31): 1 May 2014 v Hong Kong
- Last ODI: 23 January 2022 v Netherlands
- ODI shirt no.: 87
- T20I debut (cap 28): 26 October 2015 v Zimbabwe
- Last T20I: 27 March 2023 v Pakistan
- T20I shirt no.: 87

Domestic team information
- Years: Team
- 2017: Speen Ghar

Career statistics
Competition	ODI	T20I	FC	LA
Matches	17	33	20	43
Runs scored	435	764	1456	1152
Batting average	25.58	26.34	39.35	28.09
100s/50s	1/2	0/4	2/9	3/4
Top score	118	73	117	136
Balls bowled	38	–	114	62
Wickets	1	–	0	1
Bowling average	34.00	–	–	55.00
5 wickets in innings	0	–	–	0
10 wickets in match	0	–	–	0
Best bowling	1/21	–	–	1/21
Catches/stumpings	3/–	14/–	26/1	11/–
- Source: Cricinfo, 4 November 2022

Usman Ghani (Pashto: غني عثمان; born 20 November 1996) is an Afghan international cricketer. He is a right-handed opening batsman.

== Career ==
Ghani made his debut in the 2014 Asian Cricket Council Premier League against Hong Kong at Bayuemas Oval, Kuala Lumpur on May 1, 2014. He took a wicket for 21 runs in the match, besides scoring 70 runs off 68 balls. In the next ODI against the UAE, he scored 55 runs. He was the leading run scorer in the tournament with 228 runs at an average of 45.60.

On Afghanistan's tour to Zimbabwe, in the first ODI, he scored 79 runs with six fours and three sixes and help Afghanistan edge past Zimbabwe A by 16 runs in the tour match at Bulawayo Athletic Club.

In the second ODI, at Queens Sports Club, Ghani scored 118 off 143 deliveries which is the jointly equal for the highest score by an Afghanistan batsman and the highest individual score was Gulbadin Naib's 23 but Sikandar Raza's 141 helped Zimbabwe crush Afghanistan by eight wickets and took 2–0 lead in the four-match series.

He made his Twenty20 International debut for Afghanistan against Zimbabwe on 26 October 2015.

He made his first-class debut for Band-e-Amir Region in the 2017–18 Ahmad Shah Abdali 4-day Tournament on 19 November 2017.

In July 2018, he was the leading run-scorer for Band-e-Amir Region in the 2018 Ghazi Amanullah Khan Regional One Day Tournament, with 218 runs in five matches.

In September 2018, he was named in Balkh's squad in the first edition of the Afghanistan Premier League tournament. and his first-wicket partnership with Hazaratullah Zazai was also a record for any wicket in a T20I, with 236 runs scored. In September 2020, he was the leading run-scorer in the 2020 Shpageeza Cricket League, with 355 runs in seven matches.

In September 2021, he was named in Afghanistan's squad for the 2021 ICC Men's T20 World Cup.
