= Afghanistan at the Men's T20 World Cup =

Afghanistan national team performance at T20 World Cup

The Afghanistan national cricket team is one of the full members of the International Cricket Council (ICC). They became an affiliate member of ICC from 2001, and were granted associate membership in 2013. In 2017, Afghanistan was inducted as a full member. The team qualified for their first T20 World Cup in 2010, after winning the 2010 ICC World Twenty20 Qualifier, and they have qualified for every edition of the tournament since then. In the seven editions that they have participated, the team has 12 wins in 32 matches. Their best performance came in 2024 when they reached the semifinals of the tournament.

== T20 World Cup record ==
ICC T20 World Cup record											Qualification record (Note: WCL Division One served as the qualifier for the 2007 edition. For subsequent events, only the final qualification event is considered.)				
Year	Round	Position	Pld	W	L	T+W	T+L	NR	Ab (Note: Abandoned matches are not counted in the official records.)	Cap.	Pld	W	L	T	NR
(South Africa) 2007	Did not qualify										Did not participate				
(England) 2009	Did not qualify										Did not participate				
(Cricket West Indies) 2010	Group stage	12/12	2	0	2	0	0	0	0	Nowroz Mangal	7	6	1	0	0
(Sri Lanka) 2012	Group stage	11/12	2	0	2	0	0	0	0	Nowroz Mangal	9	8	1	0	0
(Bangladesh) 2014	First round	14/16	3	1	2	0	0	0	0	Mohammad Nabi	9	7	2	0	0
(India) 2016	Super 10	9/16	7	4	3	0	0	0	0	Asghar Afghan	9	5	2	0	2
(United Arab Emirates) (Oman) 2021	Super 12	7/16	5	2	3	0	0	0	0	Mohammad Nabi	Did not participate (qualified automatically)				
(Australia) 2022	Super 12	12/16	5	0	3	0	0	0	2	Mohammad Nabi	Did not participate (qualified automatically)				
(United States) (Cricket West Indies) 2024	Semi-finals	4/20	8	5	3	0	0	0	0	Rashid Khan	Qualified via T20I rankings (10th place)				
(India) (Sri Lanka) 2026	Group Stage	10/20	4	2	1	0	1	0	0	Rashid Khan	Did not participate (qualified automatically)				
Total	0 Titles	8/10	36	14	20	0	1	0	2	—	34	26	6	0	2

=== Record by opponents ===
Opponent	M	W	L	T+W	T+L	NR	Ab	Win %	First played
Australia	2	1	1	0	0	0	0	50.00	2022
Bangladesh	2	1	1	0	0	0	0	50.00	2014
Canada	1	1	0	0	0	0	0	100	2026
England	3	0	3	0	0	0	0	0.00	2012
Hong Kong	2	2	0	0	0	0	0	100	2014
India	4	0	4	0	0	0	0	0.00	2010
Ireland	1	0	0	0	0	0	1	—	2022
Namibia	1	1	0	0	0	0	0	100	2021
Nepal	1	0	1	0	0	0	0	0.00	2014
New Zealand	4	1	2	0	0	0	1	33.33	2021
Pakistan	1	0	1	0	0	0	0	0.00	2021
Papua New Guinea	1	1	0	0	0	0	0	100	2024
Scotland	2	2	0	0	0	0	0	100	2016
South Africa	4	0	3	0	1	0	0	0.00	2010
Sri Lanka	2	0	2	0	0	0	0	0.00	2016
Uganda	1	1	0	0	0	0	0	100	2024
United Arab Emirates	1	1	0	0	0	0	0	100	2026
West Indies	2	1	1	0	0	0	0	50.00	2016
Zimbabwe	1	1	0	0	0	0	0	100	2016
Total	36	14	20	0	1	0	2	41.18	—
Source: Last Updated: 8 March 2026

== Tournament results ==
=== 2010 World Cup ===
Squad

- Nawroz Mangal (c)
- Asghar Afghan
- Dawlat Ahmadzai
- Raees Ahmadzai
- Noor Ali Zadran
- Mirwais Ashraf
- Hamid Hassan
- Mohammad Nabi
- Gulbadin Naib
- Nasratullah Nasrat
- Shabir Noori
- Karim Sadiq (wk)
- Shafiqullah (wk)
- Mohammad Shahzad (wk)
- Samiullah Shenwari
- Shapoor Zadran

Results

Group stage (Group C)			Super 8s		Semifinal	Final	Overall Result
Opposition Result	Opposition Result	Rank	Opposition Result	Rank	Opposition Result	Opposition Result	Overall Result
India; Lost by 7 wickets	South Africa; Lost by 59 runs	3	Did not advance				Group stage
Source: Cricinfo

Scorecards

Group stage (Group C)

1 May
09:30
Scorecard

Afghanistan; 115/8 (20 overs)	v	India; 116/3 (14.5 overs)
Noor Ali 50 (48); Ashish Nehra 3/19 (4 overs)		Murali Vijay 48 (46); Hamid Hassan 1/8 (3 overs)

India won by 7 wickets
Beausejour Stadium, Gros Islet
Umpires: Aleem Dar (Pak) and Marais Erasmus (SA)
Player of the match: Ashish Nehra (Ind)

- India won the toss and elected to field.

5 May
17:00 (D/N)
Scorecard

South Africa; 139/7 (20 overs)	v	Afghanistan; 80 (16 overs)
Jacques Kallis 34 (33); Hamid Hassan 3/21 (4 overs)		Mirwais Ashraf 23 (25); Morné Morkel 4/20 (3 overs)

South Africa won by 59 runs
Kensington Oval, Bridgetown
Umpires: Ian Gould (Eng) and Simon Taufel (Aus)
Player of the match: Morné Morkel (SA)

- Afghanistan won the toss and elected to field.

=== 2012 World Cup ===
Squad

- Nawroz Mangal (c)
- Karim Sadiq (vc, wk)
- Javed Ahmadi
- Mohammad Nasim Baras
- Izatullah Dawlatzai
- Hamid Hassan
- Mohammad Nabi
- Gulbadin Naib
- Shafiqullah (wk)
- Mohammad Shahzad (wk)
- Samiullah Shenwari
- Asghar Afghan
- Dawlat Zadran
- Najibullah Zadran
- Shapoor Zadran

Results

Group stage (Group A)			Super 8s		Semifinal	Final	Overall Result
Opposition Result	Opposition Result	Rank	Opposition Result	Rank	Opposition Result	Opposition Result	Overall Result
India; Lost by 23 runs	England; Lost by 116 runs	3	Did not advance				Group stage
Source: Cricinfo

Scorecards

Group stage (Group A)

19 September
19:30 (D/N)
Scorecard

India; 159/5 (20 overs)	v	Afghanistan; 136 (19.3 overs)
Virat Kohli 50 (39); Shapoor Zadran 3/33 (4 overs)		Mohammad Nabi 31 (23); Lakshmipathy Balaji 3/19 (3.3 overs)

India won by 23 runs
R. Premadasa Stadium, Colombo
Umpires: Asad Rauf (Pak) and Simon Taufel (Aus)
Player of the match: Virat Kohli (Ind)

- Afghanistan won the toss and elected to field

21 September
19:30 (D/N)
Scorecard

England; 196/5 (20 overs)	v	Afghanistan; 80 (17.2 overs)
Luke Wright 99* (55); Izatullah Dawlatzai 2/56 (3 overs)		Gulbadin Naib 44 (32); Samit Patel 2/6 (3 overs)

England won by 116 runs
R. Premadasa Stadium, Colombo
Umpires: Kumar Dharmasena (SL) and Simon Taufel (Aus)
Player of the match: Luke Wright (Eng)

- Afghanistan won the toss and elected to field

=== 2014 World Cup ===
Squad

- Mohammad Nabi (c)
- Asghar Afghan
- Aftab Alam
- Mirwais Ashraf
- Hamza Hotak
- Nawroz Mangal
- Gulbadin Naib
- Karim Sadiq (wk)
- Shafiqullah (wk)
- Mohammad Shahzad (wk)
- Samiullah Shenwari
- Najib Taraki
- Dawlat Zadran
- Najibullah Zadran
- Shapoor Zadran

2014 kit

Results

First stage (Group A)				Super 10		Semifinal	Final	Overall Result
Opposition Result	Opposition Result	Opposition Result	Rank	Opposition Result	Rank	Opposition Result	Opposition Result	Overall Result
Bangladesh; Lost by 9 wickets	Hong Kong; Won by 7 wickets	Nepal; Lost by 9 runs	3	Did not advance				First stage
Source: Cricinfo

Scorecards

First stage (Group A)

16 March
15:30
Scorecard

Afghanistan; 72 (17.1 overs)	v	Bangladesh; 78/1 (12 overs)
Gulbodin Naib 21 (22); Shakib Al Hasan 3/8 (3.1 overs)		Anamul Haque 44* (33); Samiullah Shenwari 1/14 (3 overs)

Bangladesh won by 9 wickets
Sher-e-Bangla National Cricket Stadium, Dhaka
Umpires: Nigel Llong (Eng) and Richard Illingworth (Eng)
Player of the match: Shakib Al Hasan (Ban)

- Bangladesh won the toss and elected to field.

18 March
15:30
Scorecard

Hong Kong; 153/8 (20 overs)	v	Afghanistan; 154/3 (18 overs)
Mark Chapman 38 (43); Zadran, Nabi 2/27 (4 overs)		Mohammad Shahzad 68 (53); Tanwir Afzal 1/19 (3 overs)

Afghanistan won by 7 wickets
Zohur Ahmed Chowdhury Stadium, Chittagong
Umpires: S.Ravi (Ind) and Paul Reiffel (Aus)
Player of the match: Mohammad Shahzad (Afg)

- Hong Kong won the toss and elected to bat.

20 March
15:30
Scorecard

Nepal; 141/5 (20 overs)	v	Afghanistan; 132/8 (20 overs)
Subash Khakurel 56 (53); Shapoor Zadran 2/19 (4 overs)		Asghar Stanikzai 49 (36); Jitendra Mukhiya 3/18 (4 overs)

Nepal won by 9 runs
Zohur Ahmed Chowdhury Stadium, Chittagong
Umpires: S.Ravi (Ind) and Aleem Dar (Pak)
Player of the match: Jitendra Mukhiya (Nep)

- Afghanistan won the toss and elected to field.
- Afghanistan were eliminated as a result of this match.

=== 2016 World Cup ===
Squad

- Asghar Afghan (c)
- Usman Ghani
- Amir Hamza
- Hamid Hassan
- Rashid Khan
- Mohammad Nabi
- Gulbadin Naib
- Karim Sadiq (wk)
- Shafiqullah Shafaq (wk)
- Mohammad Shahzad (wk)
- Samiullah Shenwari
- Noor Ali Zadran
- Dawlat Zadran
- Najibullah Zadran
- Shapoor Zadran

2016 kit

Results

First stage (Group B)				Super 10 (Group 1)					Semifinal	Final	Overall Result
Opposition Result	Opposition Result	Opposition Result	Rank	Opposition Result	Opposition Result	Opposition Result	Opposition Result	Rank	Opposition Result	Opposition Result	Overall Result
Scotland; Won by 14 runs	Hong Kong; Won by 6 wickets	Zimbabwe; Won by 59 runs	1	Sri Lanka; Lost by 6 wickets	South Africa; Lost by 37 runs	England; Lost by 15 runs	West Indies; Won by 6 runs	5	Did not advance		Super 10
Source: Cricinfo

Scorecards

First stage (Group B)

8 March
19:30 (D/N)
Scorecard

Afghanistan; 170/5 (20 overs)	v	Scotland; 156/5 (20 overs)
Mohammad Shahzad 61 (39); Alasdair Evans 1/24 (4 overs)		George Munsey 41 (29); Rashid Khan 2/28 (4 overs)

Afghanistan won by 14 runs
Vidarbha Cricket Association Stadium, Nagpur
Umpires: Marais Erasmus (SA) and Richard Illingworth (Eng)
Player of the match: Mohammad Shahzad (Afg)

- Afghanistan won the toss and elected to bat.

10 March
19:30 (D/N)
Scorecard

Hong Kong; 116/6 (20 overs)	v	Afghanistan; 119/4 (18 overs)
Anshuman Rath 28 (31); Mohammad Nabi 4/20 (4 overs)		Mohammad Shahzad 41 (40); Ryan Campbell 2/28 (4 overs)

Afghanistan won by 6 wickets
Vidarbha Cricket Association Stadium, Nagpur
Umpires: Ian Gould (Eng) and Richard Illingworth (Eng)
Player of the match: Mohammad Nabi (Afg)

- Hong Kong won the toss and elected to bat.

12 March
15:00 (D/N)
Scorecard

Afghanistan; 186/6 (20 overs)	v	Zimbabwe; 127 (19.4 overs)
Mohammad Nabi 52 (32); Tinashe Panyangara 3/32 (4 overs)		Tinashe Panyangara 17* (7); Rashid Khan 3/11 (4 overs)

Afghanistan won by 59 runs
Vidarbha Cricket Association Stadium, Nagpur
Umpires: Aleem Dar (Pak) and Richard Illingworth (Eng)
Player of the match: Mohammad Nabi (Afg)

- Afghanistan won the toss and elected to bat.
- Afghanistan qualified for the Super 10 stage of the tournament as a result of this match.
- Afghanistan progressed to the second phase of a World Twenty20 tournament for the first time.

Super 10 (Group 1)

17 March
19:30 (D/N)
Scorecard

Afghanistan; 153/7 (20 overs)	v	Sri Lanka; 155/4 (18.5 overs)
Asghar Stanikzai 62 (47); Thisara Perera 3/33 (4 overs)		Tillakaratne Dilshan 83* (56); Mohammad Nabi 1/25 (4 overs)

Sri Lanka won by 6 wickets
Eden Gardens, Kolkata
Umpires: Bruce Oxenford (Aus) and Joel Wilson (WI)
Player of the match: Tillakaratne Dilshan (SL)

- Afghanistan won the toss and elected to bat.

20 March
15:00 (D/N)
Scorecard

South Africa; 209/5 (20 overs)	v	Afghanistan; 172 (20 overs)
AB de Villiers 64 (29); Amir Hamza 1/25 (3 overs)		Mohammad Shahzad 44 (19); Chris Morris 4/27 (4 overs)

South Africa won by 37 runs
Wankhede Stadium, Mumbai
Umpires: Chris Gaffaney (NZ) and Paul Reiffel (Aus)
Player of the match: Chris Morris (SA)

- South Africa won the toss and elected to bat.

23 March
15:00 (D/N)
Scorecard

England; 142/7 (20 overs)	v	Afghanistan; 127/9 (20 overs)
Moeen Ali 41* (33); Mohammad Nabi 2/17 (4 overs); Rashid Khan 2/17 (4 overs)		Shafiqullah 35* (20); Adil Rashid 2/18 (3 overs)

England won by 15 runs
Feroz Shah Kotla, Delhi
Umpires: Sundaram Ravi (Ind) and Rod Tucker (Aus)
Player of the match: Moeen Ali (Eng)

- England won the toss and elected to bat.
- Afghanistan were eliminated as a result of this match.

27 March
15:00 (D/N)
Scorecard

Afghanistan; 123/7 (20 overs)	v	West Indies; 117/8 (20 overs)
Najibullah Zadran 48 (40); Samuel Badree 3/14 (4 overs)		Dwayne Bravo 28 (29); Rashid Khan 2/26 (4 overs); Mohammad Nabi 2/26 (4 overs)

Afghanistan won by 6 runs
Vidarbha Cricket Association Stadium, Nagpur
Umpires: Aleem Dar (Pak) and Bruce Oxenford (Aus)
Player of the match: Najibullah Zadran (Afg)

- West Indies won the toss and elected to field.
- Afghanistan's score was the second-lowest total successfully defended in a World Twenty20 match.
- It was the first time Afghanistan and West Indies played each other in an international fixture.

=== 2021 World Cup ===
Squad

- Mohammad Nabi (c)
- Fareed Ahmad
- Sharafuddin Ashraf
- Usman Ghani
- Rahmanullah Gurbaz (wk)
- Hamid Hassan
- Karim Janat
- Rashid Khan
- Gulbadin Naib
- Hashmatullah Shahidi
- Mohammad Shahzad (wk)
- Naveen-ul-Haq
- Mujeeb Ur Rahman
- Najibullah Zadran
- Hazratullah Zazai

Home kit

Away kit

Results

Super 12 (Group 2)						Semifinal	Final	Overall Result
Opposition Result	Opposition Result	Opposition Result	Opposition Result	Opposition Result	Rank	Opposition Result	Opposition Result	Overall Result
Scotland; Won by 130 runs	Pakistan; Lost by 5 wickets	Namibia; Won by 62 runs	India; Lost by 66 runs	New Zealand; Lost by 8 wickets	4	Did not advance		Super 12
Source: Cricinfo

Scorecards

Super 12 (Group 2)

25 October 2021
18:00 (N)
Scorecard

Afghanistan; 190/4 (20 overs)	v	Scotland; 60 (10.2 overs)
Najibullah Zadran 59 (34); Safyaan Sharif 2/33 (4 overs)		George Munsey 25 (18); Mujeeb Ur Rahman 5/20 (4 overs)

Afghanistan won by 130 runs
Sharjah Cricket Stadium, Sharjah
Umpires: Kumar Dharmasena (SL) and Paul Wilson (Aus)
Player of the match: Mujeeb Ur Rahman (Afg)

- Afghanistan won the toss and elected to bat.
- Mujeeb Ur Rahman (Afg) took his first five-wicket haul in T20Is.
- Mujeeb Ur Rahman became the first player to take a five-wicket haul on T20 World Cup debut.
- In terms of runs, this was Afghanistan's biggest winning margin in T20Is.

29 October 2021
18:00 (N)
Scorecard

Afghanistan; 147/6 (20 overs)	v	Pakistan; 148/5 (19 overs)
Gulbadin Naib 35* (25); Imad Wasim 2/25 (4 overs)		Babar Azam 51 (47); Rashid Khan 2/26 (4 overs)

Pakistan won by 5 wickets
Dubai International Cricket Stadium, Dubai
Umpires: Chris Brown (NZ) and Joel Wilson (WI)
Player of the match: Asif Ali (Pak)

- Afghanistan won the toss and elected to bat.
- Rashid Khan (Afg) became the fastest bowler, in terms of matches, to take 100 wickets in T20Is (53).

31 October 2021
14:00
Scorecard

Afghanistan; 160/5 (20 overs)	v	Namibia; 98/9 (20 overs)
Mohammad Shahzad 45 (33); Jan Nicol Loftie-Eaton 2/21 (4 overs)		David Wiese 26 (30); Hamid Hassan 3/9 (4 overs)

Afghanistan won by 62 runs
Sheikh Zayed Cricket Stadium, Abu Dhabi
Umpires: Chris Gaffaney (NZ) and Ahsan Raza (Pak)
Player of the match: Naveen-ul-Haq (Afg)

- Afghanistan won the toss and elected to bat.
- Mohammad Shahzad became the first player for Afghanistan to score 2,000 runs in T20Is.

3 November 2021
18:00 (N)
Scorecard

India; 210/2 (20 overs)	v	Afghanistan; 144/7 (20 overs)
Rohit Sharma 74 (47); Karim Janat 1/7 (1 over)		Karim Janat 42* (22); Mohammed Shami 3/32 (4 overs)

India won by 66 runs
Sheikh Zayed Cricket Stadium, Abu Dhabi
Umpires: Richard Kettleborough (Eng) and Paul Reiffel (Aus)
Player of the match: Rohit Sharma (Ind)

- Afghanistan won the toss and elected to field.

7 November 2021
14:00
Scorecard

Afghanistan; 124/8 (20 overs)	v	New Zealand; 125/2 (18.1 overs)
Najibullah Zadran 73 (48); Trent Boult 3/17 (4 overs)		Kane Williamson 40* (42); Rashid Khan 1/27 (4 overs)

New Zealand won by 8 wickets
Sheikh Zayed Cricket Stadium, Abu Dhabi
Umpires: Kumar Dharmasena (SL) and Langton Rusere (Zim)
Player of the match: Trent Boult (NZ)

- Afghanistan won the toss and elected to bat.
- Rashid Khan (Afg) took his 400th wicket in Twenty20 cricket.

=== 2022 World Cup ===
Squad and kit

- Mohammad Nabi (c)
- Najibullah Zadran (vc)
- Fareed Ahmad
- Qais Ahmad
- Fazalhaq Farooqi
- Usman Ghani
- Rahmanullah Gurbaz (wk)
- Rashid Khan
- Gulbadin Naib
- Azmatullah Omarzai
- Darwish Rasooli
- Mohammad Saleem
- Naveen-ul-Haq
- Mujeeb Ur Rahman
- Ibrahim Zadran

Home kit

Away kit

Results

Super 12 (Group 1)						Semifinal	Final	Overall Result
Opposition Result	Opposition Result	Opposition Result	Opposition Result	Opposition Result	Rank	Opposition Result	Opposition Result	Overall Result
England; Lost by 5 wickets	New Zealand; Match abandoned	Ireland; Match abandoned	Sri Lanka; Lost by 6 wickets	Australia; Lost by 4 runs	6	Did not advance		Super 12
Source: Cricinfo

Scorecards

Super 12 (Group 1)

22 October 2022
19:00 (N)
Scorecard

Afghanistan; 112 (19.4 overs)	v	England; 113/5 (18.1 overs)
Ibrahim Zadran 32 (32); Sam Curran 5/10 (3.4 overs)		Liam Livingstone 29* (21); Mohammad Nabi 1/16 (3 overs)

England won by 5 wickets
Perth Stadium, Perth
Umpires: Chris Brown (NZ) and Aleem Dar (Pak)
Player of the match: Sam Curran (Eng)

- England won the toss and elected to field.

26 October 2022
19:00 (N)
Scorecard

Afghanistan	v	New Zealand

Match abandoned
Melbourne Cricket Ground, Melbourne
Umpires: Kumar Dharmasena (SL) and Paul Wilson (Aus)

- No toss.
- No play was possible due to rain.

28 October 2022
15:00
Scorecard

Afghanistan	v	Ireland

Match abandoned
Melbourne Cricket Ground, Melbourne
Umpires: Aleem Dar (Pak) and Adrian Holdstock (SA)

- No toss.
- No play was possible due to rain.

1 November 2022
14:00
Scorecard

Afghanistan; 144/8 (20 overs)	v	Sri Lanka; 148/4 (18.3 overs)
Rahmanullah Gurbaz 28 (24); Wanindu Hasaranga 3/13 (4 overs)		Dhananjaya de Silva 66* (42); Mujeeb Ur Rahman 2/24 (4 overs)

Sri Lanka won by 6 wickets
The Gabba, Brisbane
Umpires: Ahsan Raza (Pak) and Rod Tucker (Aus)
Player of the match: Wanindu Hasaranga (SL)

- Afghanistan won the toss and elected to bat.
- Afghanistan were eliminated as a result of this

4 November 2022
18:30 (N)
Scorecard

Australia; 168/8 (20 overs)	v	Afghanistan; 164/7 (20 overs)
Glenn Maxwell 54* (32); Naveen-ul-Haq 3/21 (4 overs)		Rashid Khan 48* (23); Adam Zampa 2/22 (4 overs)

Australia won by 4 runs
Adelaide Oval, Adelaide
Umpires: Aleem Dar (Pak) and Langton Rusere (Zim)
Player of the match: Glenn Maxwell (Aus)

- Afghanistan won the toss and elected to field.

=== 2024 World Cup ===
Squad and kit

- Rashid Khan (c)
- Fareed Ahmad
- Noor Ahmad
- Fazalhaq Farooqi
- Rahmanullah Gurbaz (wk)
- Mohammad Ishaq (wk)
- Karim Janat
- Mohammad Nabi
- Gulbadin Naib
- Azmatullah Omarzai
- Nangialai Kharoti
- Naveen-ul-Haq
- Mujeeb Ur Rahman
- Ibrahim Zadran
- Najibullah Zadran

2024 kit

Results

Group stage (Group C)					Super 8 (Group 1)				Semifinal	Final	Overall Result
Opposition Result	Opposition Result	Opposition Result	Opposition Result	Rank	Opposition Result	Opposition Result	Opposition Result	Rank	Opposition Result	Opposition Result	Overall Result
Uganda; Won by 125 runs	New Zealand; Won by 84 runs	Papua New Guinea; Won by 7 wickets	West Indies; Lost by 104 runs	2	India; Lost by 47 runs	Australia; Won by 21 runs	Bangladesh; Won by 8 runs (DLS)	2	South Africa; Lost by 9 wickets	Did not advance	Semifinal
Source: Cricinfo

Scorecards

Group stage (Group C)

3 June 2024
20:30 UTC−4 (N)
Scorecard

Afghanistan; 183/5 (20 overs)	v	Uganda; 58 (16 overs)
Rahmanullah Gurbaz 76 (45); Brian Masaba 2/21 (4 overs)		Robinson Obuya 14 (25); Fazalhaq Farooqi 5/9 (4 overs)

Afghanistan won by 125 runs
Providence Stadium, Guyana
Umpires: Kumar Dharmasena (SL) and Ahsan Raza (Pak)
Player of the match: Fazalhaq Farooqi (Afg)

- Uganda won the toss and elected to field.
- Fazalhaq Farooqi (Afg) took his maiden five-wicket haul in T20Is.

7 June 2024
19:30 UTC−4 (N)
Scorecard

Afghanistan; 159/6 (20 overs)	v	New Zealand; 75 (15.2 overs)
Rahmanullah Gurbaz 80 (56); Trent Boult 2/22 (4 overs)		Glenn Phillips 18 (18); Fazalhaq Farooqi 4/17 (3.2 overs)

Afghanistan won by 84 runs
Providence Stadium, Guyana
Umpires: Kumar Dharmasena (SL) and Ahsan Raza (Pak)
Player of the match: Rahmanullah Gurbaz (Afg)

- New Zealand won the toss and elected to field.
- This was Afghanistan's first win against New Zealand in T20Is.

13 June 2024
20:30 UTC−4 (N)
Scorecard

Papua New Guinea; 95 (19.5 overs)	v	Afghanistan; 101/3 (15.1 overs)
Kiplin Doriga 27 (32); Fazalhaq Farooqi 3/16 (4 overs)		Gulbadin Naib 49* (36); Semo Kamea 1/16 (3 overs)

Afghanistan won by 7 wickets
Brian Lara Cricket Academy, San Fernando
Umpires: Michael Gough (Eng) and Alex Wharf (Eng)
Player of the match: Fazalhaq Farooqi (Afg)

- Afghanistan won the toss and elected to field.
- Afghanistan qualified for the Super 8 as a result of this match.

17 June 2024
20:30 UTC−4 (N)
Scorecard

West Indies; 218/5 (20 overs)	v	Afghanistan; 114 (16.2 overs)
Nicholas Pooran 98 (53); Gulbadin Naib 2/14 (2 overs)		Ibrahim Zadran 38 (28); Obed McCoy 3/14 (3 overs)

West Indies won by 104 runs
Daren Sammy Cricket Ground, Gros Islet
Umpires: Chris Brown (NZ) and Allahudien Paleker (SA)
Player of the match: Nicholas Pooran (WI)

- Afghanistan won the toss and elected to field.

Super 8 (Group 1)

20 June 2024
10:30 UTC−4
Scorecard

India; 181/8 (20 overs)	v	Afghanistan; 134 (20 overs)
Suryakumar Yadav 53 (28); Rashid Khan 3/26 (4 overs)		Azmatullah Omarzai 26 (20); Jasprit Bumrah 3/7 (4 overs)

India won by 47 runs
Kensington Oval, Bridgetown
Umpires: Paul Reiffel (Aus) and Rod Tucker (Aus)
Player of the match: Suryakumar Yadav (Ind)

- India won the toss and elected to bat.

22 June 2024
20:30 UTC−4 (N)
Scorecard

Afghanistan; 148/6 (20 overs)	v	Australia; 127 (19.2 overs)
Rahmanullah Gurbaz 60 (49); Pat Cummins 3/28 (4 overs)		Glenn Maxwell 59 (41); Gulbadin Naib 4/20 (4 overs)

Afghanistan won by 21 runs
Arnos Vale Stadium, Kingstown
Umpires: Kumar Dharmasena (SL) and Ahsan Raza (Pak)
Player of the match: Gulbadin Naib (Afg)

- Australia won the toss and elected to field.
- This was Afghanistan's first win against Australia in T20Is.

24 June 2024
20:30 UTC−4 (N)
Scorecard

Afghanistan; 115/5 (20 overs)	v	Bangladesh; 105 (17.5 overs)
Rahmanullah Gurbaz 43 (55); Rishad Hossain 3/26 (4 overs)		Litton Das 54* (49); Rashid Khan 4/23 (4 overs)

Afghanistan won by 8 runs (DLS method)
Arnos Vale Stadium, Kingstown
Umpires: Nitin Menon (Ind) and Langton Rusere (Zim)
Player of the match: Naveen-ul-Haq (Afg)

- Afghanistan won the toss and elected to bat.
- Bangladesh were set a revised target of 114 runs off 19 overs due to rain.
- Rashid Khan (Afg) took his 150th wicket in T20Is.
- This was Afghanistan's first win against Bangladesh in T20 World Cup.
- Afghanistan qualified for the semi-finals as a result of this match.
- Afghanistan qualified for the semi-finals of any major ICC Tournament for the first time.

Knockout stage

Semi-final 1
26 June 2024
20:30 UTC−4 (N)
Scorecard

Afghanistan; 56 (11.5 overs)	v	South Africa; 60/1 (8.5 overs)
Azmatullah Omarzai 10 (12); Tabraiz Shamsi 3/6 (1.5 overs)		Reeza Hendricks 29* (25); Fazalhaq Farooqi 1/11 (2 overs)

South Africa won by 9 wickets
Brian Lara Cricket Academy, San Fernando
Umpires: Richard Illingworth (Eng) and Nitin Menon (Ind)
Player of the match: Marco Jansen (SA)

- Afghanistan won the toss and elected to bat.
- This was the first time Afghanistan played in a major ICC tournament semi-final.
- Fazalhaq Farooqi (Afg) broke the record of most wickets at a single edition of the Men's T20 World Cup (17), previously held by Wanindu Hasaranga of Sri Lanka (16).
- Afghanistan posted their lowest T20I score. It was also the lowest score in a T20 World Cup semi-final.

=== 2026 World Cup ===
Squad and kit

- Rashid Khan (c)
- Ibrahim Zadran (vc)
- Fazalhaq Farooqi
- Mohammad Nabi
- Azmatullah Omarzai
- Gulbadin Naib
- Noor Ahmad
- Rahmanullah Gurbaz (wk)
- Shahidullah
- Sediqullah Atal
- Mohammad Ishaq (wk)
- Abdullah Ahmadzai
- Ziaur Rahman
- Mujeeb Ur Rahman
- Darwish Rasooli

Reserve players:

- Fareed Ahmad
- Ijaz Ahmad Ahmadzai
- Allah Ghazanfar
- Note: Ziaur Rahman replaced Naveen ul Haq due to an injury.

2026 kit

Results

Group stage (Group D)					Super 8		Semifinal	Final	Overall Result
Opposition Result	Opposition Result	Opposition Result	Opposition Result	Rank	Opposition Result	Rank	Opposition Result	Opposition Result	Overall Result
New Zealand; Lost by 5 wickets	South Africa; Tied (Lost the 2nd S/O)	United Arab Emirates; Won by 5 wickets	Canada; Won by 82 runs	3	Did not advance				Group stage
Source: Cricinfo

Scorecards

Group stage (Group D)

Match 4
8 February 2026
11:00 UTC+5:30
Scorecard

Afghanistan; 182/6 (20 overs)	v	New Zealand; 183/5 (17.5 overs)
Gulbadin Naib 63 (35); Lockie Ferguson 2/40 (4 overs)		Tim Seifert 65 (42); Mujeeb Ur Rahman 2/31 (4 overs)

New Zealand won by 5 wickets
M. A. Chidambaram Stadium, Chennai
Attendance: 24,991
Umpires: Langton Rusere (Zim) and Alex Wharf (Eng)
Player of the match: Tim Seifert (NZ)

- Afghanistan won the toss and elected to bat.
- Gulbadin Naib (Afg) scored his 1,000th run in T20Is.
- Tim Seifert (NZ) scored his 2,000th run in T20Is.
- This was New Zealand's highest run chase in the T20 World Cup.

Match 13
11 February 2026
11:00 UTC+5:30
Scorecard

South Africa; 187/6 (20 overs)	v	Afghanistan; 187 (19.4 overs)
Ryan Rickelton 61 (28); Azmatullah Omarzai 3/41 (4 overs)		Rahmanullah Gurbaz 84 (42); Lungi Ngidi 3/26 (4 overs)

Match tied (South Africa won the second Super Over)
Narendra Modi Stadium, Ahmedabad
Umpires: Jayaraman Madanagopal (Ind) and Sharfuddoula (Ban)
Player of the match: Lungi Ngidi (SA)

- Afghanistan won the toss and elected to field.
- Super Over: Afghanistan 17/0, South Africa 17/1.
- Second Super Over: South Africa 23/0, Afghanistan 19/2.

Match 28
16 February 2026
11:00 UTC+5:30
Scorecard

United Arab Emirates; 160/9 (20 overs)	v	Afghanistan; 162/5 (19.2 overs)
Sohaib Khan 68 (48); Azmatullah Omarzai 4/15 (4 overs)		Ibrahim Zadran 53 (41); Junaid Siddique 2/23 (3.2 overs)

Afghanistan won by 5 wickets
Arun Jaitley Cricket Stadium, New Delhi
Umpires: Roland Black (Ire) and Leslie Reifer (WI)
Player of the match: Azmatullah Omarzai (Afg)

- Afghanistan won the toss and elected to field.
- Rashid Khan (Afg) took his 700th wicket in the T20 format, the first cricketer to achieve this milestone.
- South Africa qualified for the Super 8 as a result of this match.

Match 39
19 February 2026
19:00 UTC+5:30 (N)
Scorecard

Afghanistan; 200/4 (20 overs)	v	Canada; 118/8 (20 overs)
Ibrahim Zadran 95* (56); Jaskaran Singh 3/52 (4 overs)		Harsh Thaker 30 (24); Mohammad Nabi 4/7 (4 overs)

Afghanistan won by 82 runs
M. A. Chidambaram Stadium, Chennai
Umpires: Nitin Menon (Ind) and Gazi Sohel (Ban)
Player of the match: Ibrahim Zadran (Afg)

- Canada won the toss and elected to field.

== Records and statistics ==
=== Most appearances ===
This list consists top five players with most number of matches at the T20 World Cup. Mohammad Nabi has played a total of 22 matches, out of which he has captained the team in 11 matches.

No.	Player	Matches	Years
1	Mohammad Nabi	22	2010-2022
2	Mohammad Shahzad	19	2010-2021
3	Najibullah Zadran	18	2012-2022
4	Gulbadin Naib	17	2012-2022
5	Asghar Afghan	16	2010-2021
Last updated: 4 November 2022

=== Most runs ===
No.	Player	Runs	Average	HS	100	50	4s	6s	Years
1	Mohammad Shahzad	402	21.15	68	-	2	41	18	2010–2021
2	Najibullah Zadran	316	26.33	73	-	2	28	13	2012–2022
3	Mohammad Nabi	291	16.16	52	-	1	25	7	2010–2022
4	Asghar Afghan	287	22.07	62	-	2	13	13	2010–2021
5	Gulbadin Naib	247	20.58	44	-	-	24	8	2012–2022
Last updated: 4 November 2022

=== Most wickets ===
No.	Player	Wickets	BBI	Years
1	Rashid Khan	23	4/9	2016–2022
2	Mohammad Nabi	19	4/20	2010–2022
3	Mujeeb Ur Rahman	11	5/20	2021–2022
4	Hamid Hassan	10	3/9	2010–2021
5	Shapoor Zadran	9	2/19	2010–2016
Last updated: 4 November 2022

== See also ==
- Afghanistan at the Cricket World Cup
- ICC Men's T20 World Cup
