= List of Afghanistan first-class cricketers =

This is a list of Afghanistan first-class cricketers, correct as of 21 January 2013. First-class cricket matches are those between international teams or the highest standard of domestic teams in which teams have two innings each. Generally, matches are eleven players a side but there have been exceptions. Today all matches must be scheduled to have at least three days' duration; historically, matches were played to a finish with no pre-defined timespan. The list includes any player to have played for the Afghanistan national cricket team who has also played first-class cricket, whether for Afghanistan or another team. The list is in alphabetical order by first name, as is custom in cricket for players from Muslim countries.

Name	Career Span	Matches	Teams
Abdullah Mazari	2009-2010	4	Afghanistan, Peshawar
Afsar Zazai	2011/12-12	2	Afghanistan
Ahmed Shah	2009	2	Afghanistan
Asghar Stanikzai	2009-2011	9	Afghanistan
Dawlat Ahmadzai	2009-2010	2	Afghanistan
Dawlat Zadran	2011-2011/12	2	Afghanistan
Gulbudeen Naib	2012	1	Afghanistan
Hamid Hassan	2007-2011	12	Afghanistan, MCC, Pakistan Customs
Hamza Hotak	2011	2	Afghanistan
Izatullah Dawlatzai	2010	3	Afghanistan
Javed Ahmadi	2010-2011	2	Afghanistan
Karim Sadiq	2010-2011	7	Afghanistan
Khaliq Dad	2010	1	Afghanistan
Mirwais Ashraf	2009-2011	7	Afghanistan
Mohammad Nabi	2007-2011	19	Afghanistan, MCC, Pakistan Customs
Mohammad Shahzad	2009-2011	9	Afghanistan
Najibullah Zadran	2012	1	Afghanistan
Nawroz Mangal	2009-2011	9	Afghanistan
Noor Ali Zadran	2009-11	6	Afghanistan
Raees Ahmadzai	2009-2010	3	Afghanistan
Samiullah Shenwari	2009-2011	9	Afghanistan
Shabir Noori	2010	3	Afghanistan
Shapoor Zadran	2009-2010	6	Afghanistan

== See also ==
- Afghanistan national cricket team
- List of Afghanistan ODI cricketers
- List of Afghanistan T20I cricketers
