= Afghanistan at the Cricket World Cup =

Afghanistan cricket team history at ICC Men's World Cup Events

Beginning in the mid 1800s, Cricket has been widely popular in Afghanistan, though progress on the international level was slow. In 1995, The Afghanistan Cricket Board was founded. Afghanistan became an affiliate member of ICC in 2001, after forming a national team. From 2008 to 2013, Afghanistan went from Division Five of the World Cricket League to an Associate Member. With consistent performances, they also were given full member status in 2017.

Afghanistan qualified for the 2015 Cricket World Cup after finishing as runners-up of the 2011-13 WCL Championship, marking their maiden appearance at the World Cup. The team was also successful in securing their first ever win at a World Cup, defeating Scotland. Afghanistan qualified for final of 2018 Qualifier and defeated the West Indies to qualify for the 2019 Cricket World Cup. Their best performance came in 2023 edition where they secured 4 wins, defeating the likes of England, Pakistan and Sri Lanka.

== Cricket World Cup record ==
Cricket World Cup record									Qualification record				
Year	Round	Position	Pld	W	L	T	NR	Captain	Pld	W	L	T	NR
(England) 1975	Not eligible (not an ICC member)								Did not enter (not an ICC member)				
(England) 1979	Not eligible (not an ICC member)								Did not enter (not an ICC member)				
(England) 1983	Not eligible (not an ICC member)								Did not enter (not an ICC member)				
(India) (Pakistan) 1987	Not eligible (not an ICC member)								Did not enter (not an ICC member)				
(Australia) (New Zealand) 1992	Not eligible (not an ICC member)								Did not enter (not an ICC member)				
(India) (Pakistan) (Sri Lanka) 1996	Not eligible (not an ICC member)								Did not enter (not an ICC member)				
(England) (Scotland) (Republic of Ireland) (Netherlands) 1999	Not eligible (not an ICC member)								Did not enter (not an ICC member)				
(South Africa) (Zimbabwe) (Kenya) 2003	Not an ICC member at time of qualifying								Did not enter (not an ICC member)				
(Cricket West Indies) 2007	Did not qualify								6	2	4	0	0
(India) (Bangladesh) (Sri Lanka) 2011	Did not qualify								28	22	6	0	1
(Australia) (New Zealand) 2015	Group Stage	12/14	6	1	5	0	0	Mohammad Nabi	20	13	6	0	1
(England) 2019	League Stage	10/10	9	0	9	0	0	Gulbadin Naib	8	5	3	0	0
(India) 2023	League Stage	6/10	9	4	5	0	0	Hashmatullah Shahidi	18	14	3	0	1
Total	0 Titles	3/13	24	5	19	0	0	—N/a	80	56	22	0	2

=== World Cup Record (By Team) ===
Cricket World Cup matches (By team)
Opponents	Played	Wins	Losses	Ties	Win%
Australia	3	0	3	0	0%
Bangladesh	3	0	3	0	0%
England	3	1	2	0	33.33%
Sri Lanka	3	1	2	0	33.33%
South Africa	2	0	2	0	0%
New Zealand	2	0	2	0	0%
India	2	0	2	0	0%
Pakistan	2	1	1	0	50%
West Indies	1	0	1	0	0%
Scotland	1	1	0	0	100%
Netherlands	1	1	0	0	100%
Total	23	5	18	0	21.73%

== Tournament history ==
=== 2015 Cricket World Cup ===
The 2015 Cricket World was the first Cricket World Cup Afghanistan participated in. Afghanistan was grouped with hosts Australia and New Zealand. The group also included test playing nations Sri Lanka, England and Bangladesh, along with Scotland.

Squad

- Mohammad Nabi (c)
- Javed Ahmadi (vc)
- Afsar Zazai (wk)
- Nawroz Mangal
- Asghar Afghan
- Shafiqullah (wk)
- Samiullah Shenwari
- Najibullah Zadran
- Gulbadin Naib
- Hamid Hassan
- Shapoor Zadran
- Usman Ghani
- Aftab Alam
- Nasir Jamal
- Dawlat Zadran
- Note: Mirwais Ashraf was replaced by Shafiqullah.

Results

Pool stage (Pool A)							Quarter final	Semifinal	Final	Overall Result
Opposition Result	Opposition Result	Opposition Result	Opposition Result	Opposition Result	Opposition Result	Rank	Opposition Result	Opposition Result	Opposition Result	Overall Result
Bangladesh; L by 105 runs	Sri Lanka; L by 4 wickets	Scotland; W by 1 wicket	Australia; L by 275 runs	New Zealand; L by 6 wickets	England; L by 9 wickets (D/L)	6	Did not advance			Pool stage

Scorecards

Pool stage (Pool A)

18 February
14:30 (AEDT) (D/N)
Scorecard

Bangladesh; 267 (50 overs)	v	Afghanistan; 162 (42.5 overs)
Mushfiqur Rahim 71 (56); Shapoor Zadran 2/20 (7 overs)		Mohammad Nabi 44 (43); Mashrafe Mortaza 3/20 (9 overs)

Bangladesh won by 105 runs
Manuka Oval, Canberra
Attendance: 10,972
Umpires: Steve Davis (Aus) and Joel Wilson (WI)
Player of the match: Mushfiqur Rahim (Ban)

- Bangladesh won the toss and elected to bat.
- Shakib Al Hasan became the first Bangladeshi cricketer to reach 4,000 ODI runs.

22 February
11:00 (NZDT)
Scorecard

Afghanistan; 232 (49.4 overs)	v	Sri Lanka; 236/6 (48.2 overs)
Asghar Afghan 54 (57); Lasith Malinga 3/41 (7 overs)		Mahela Jayawardene 100 (120); Hamid Hassan 3/45 (9 overs)

Sri Lanka won by 4 wickets
University Oval, Dunedin
Attendance: 2,711
Umpires: Chris Gaffaney (NZ) and Richard Illingworth (Eng)
Player of the match: Mahela Jayawardene (SL)

- Sri Lanka won the toss and elected to field.
- Both Sri Lanka openers (Lahiru Thirimanne and Tillakaratne Dilshan) were dismissed for golden ducks. It was the second time in ODI history where this has occurred.
- Hamid Hassan became first Afghan bowler to take 50 ODI wickets and seventh-quickest in the world to take 50 ODI wickets.

26 February
11:00 (NZDT)
Scorecard

Scotland; 210 (50 overs)	v	Afghanistan; 211/9 (49.3 overs)
Matt Machan 31 (28); Shapoor Zadran 4/38 (10 overs)		Samiullah Shenwari 96 (147); Richie Berrington 4/40 (10 overs)

Afghanistan won by 1 wicket
University Oval, Dunedin
Attendance: 3,229
Umpires: Simon Fry (Aus) and Ruchira Palliyaguruge (SL)
Player of the match: Samiullah Shenwari (Afg)

- Afghanistan won the toss and elected to field.
- This was the first time Scotland scored over 200 in a World Cup match.
- Alasdair Evans and Majid Haq's ninth-wicket partnership of 62 was Scotland's best ninth-wicket partnership in ODIs.
- This was Afghanistan's first ever World Cup win.
- Scotland captain Preston Mommsen was fined 20% of his match fee, and the other Scotland players 10%, for a slow over rate.

4 March
14:30 (AWST) (D/N)
Scorecard

Australia; 417/6 (50 overs)	v	Afghanistan; 142 (37.3 overs)
David Warner 178 (133); Shapoor Zadran 2/89 (10 overs)		Nawroz Mangal 33 (35); Mitchell Johnson 4/22 (7.3 overs)

Australia won by 275 runs
WACA Ground, Perth
Attendance: 12,710
Umpires: Kumar Dharmasena (SL) and Michael Gough (Eng)
Player of the match: David Warner (Aus)

- Afghanistan won the toss and elected to field.
- Australia's score of 417/6 is the second highest in World Cup history.
- Dawlat Zadran (Afg) became the third bowler in World Cup matches to concede 100 runs or more in an innings.
- Australia's victory margin of 275 runs is the third highest in World Cup history.

8 March
11:00 (NZDT)
Scorecard

Afghanistan; 186 (47.4 overs)	v	New Zealand; 188/4 (36.1 overs)
Najibullah Zadran 56 (56); Daniel Vettori 4/18 (10 overs)		Martin Guptill 57 (76); Shapoor Zadran 1/45 (10 overs)

New Zealand won by 6 wickets
McLean Park, Napier
Attendance: 10,022
Umpires: Johan Cloete (SA) and Marais Erasmus (SA)
Player of the match: Daniel Vettori (NZ)

- Afghanistan won the toss and elected to bat.
- Daniel Vettori (NZ) took his 300th ODI wicket in this match.
- Afghanistan was eliminated from the World Cup as a result of this match.

13 March
14:30 (AEDT) (D/N)
Scorecard

Afghanistan; 111/7 (36.2 overs)	v	England; 101/1 (18.1 overs)
Shafiqullah 30 (64); Chris Jordan 2/13 (6.2 overs)		Ian Bell 52* (56); Hamid Hassan 1/17 (5 overs)

England won by 9 wickets (D/L method)
SCG, Sydney
Attendance: 9,203
Umpires: Billy Bowden (NZ) and Sundaram Ravi (Ind)
Player of the match: Chris Jordan (Eng)

- England won the toss and elected to field.
- Afghanistan's innings ended in the 37th over and England's target reduced to 101 off 25 overs due to rain.

=== 2019 Cricket World Cup ===
2019 World Cup was the second World Cup in which Afghanistan participated. This World Cup was in Round robin format where Afghanistan faced all the other teams which include Australia, Bangladesh, England, India, New Zealand, Pakistan, South Africa, Sri Lanka and West Indies, but did not manage to claim victory against any national team in the tournament.

Squad

- Gulbadin Naib (c)
- Rashid Khan (vc)
- Mohammad Shahzad (wk)
- Noor Ali Zadran
- Hazratullah Zazai
- Rahmat Shah
- Hashmatullah Shahidi
- Asghar Afghan
- Mohammad Nabi
- Najibullah Zadran
- Samiullah Shenwari
- Mujeeb Ur Rahman
- Dawlat Zadran
- Aftab Alam
- Hamid Hassan

Results

League stage										Semifinal	Final	Overall Result
Opposition Result	Opposition Result	Opposition Result	Opposition Result	Opposition Result	Opposition Result	Opposition Result	Opposition Result	Opposition Result	Rank	Opposition Result	Opposition Result	Overall Result
Australia; L by 7 wickets	Sri Lanka; L by 34 runs (DLS)	New Zealand; L by 7 wickets	South Africa; L by 9 wickets (DLS)	England; L by 150 runs	India; L by 11 runs	Bangladesh; L by 62 runs	Pakistan; L by 3 wickets	West Indies; L by 23 runs	10	Did not advance		League stage

Scorecards

League stage

1 June 2019
13:30 (D/N)
Scorecard

Afghanistan; 207 (38.2 overs)	v	Australia; 209/3 (34.5 overs)
Najibullah Zadran 51 (49); Pat Cummins 3/40 (8.2 overs)		David Warner 89* (114); Gulbadin Naib 1/32 (5 overs)

Australia won by 7 wickets
County Ground, Bristol
Umpires: Aleem Dar (Pak) and Richard Illingworth (Eng)
Player of the match: David Warner (Aus)

- Afghanistan won the toss and elected to bat.
- Rashid Khan (Afg) played in his 100th international match, which included one game with a World XI side in May 2018.

4 June 2019
10:30
Scorecard

Sri Lanka; 201 (36.5 overs)	v	Afghanistan; 152 (32.4 overs)
Kusal Perera 78 (81); Mohammad Nabi 4/30 (9 overs)		Najibullah Zadran 43 (56); Nuwan Pradeep 4/31 (9 overs)

Sri Lanka won by 34 runs (DLS method)
Sophia Gardens, Cardiff
Umpires: Nigel Llong (Eng) and Paul Wilson (Aus)
Player of the match: Nuwan Pradeep (SL)

- Afghanistan won the toss and elected to field.
- Afghanistan were set a revised target of 187 runs from 41 overs due to rain.
- Rashid Khan played in his 100th international match for Afghanistan.
- Lahiru Thirimanne (SL) scored his 3,000th run in ODIs.

8 June 2019
13:30 (D/N)
Scorecard

Afghanistan; 172 (41.1 overs)	v	New Zealand; 173/3 (32.1 overs)
Hashmatullah Shahidi 59 (99); James Neesham 5/31 (10 overs)		Kane Williamson 79* (99); Aftab Alam 3/45 (8.1 overs)

New Zealand won by 7 wickets
County Ground, Taunton
Umpires: Aleem Dar (Pak) and Michael Gough (Eng)
Player of the match: James Neesham (NZ)

- New Zealand won the toss and elected to field.
- James Neesham (NZ) took his maiden five-wicket haul and his 50th wicket in ODIs.

15 June 2019
13:30 (D/N)
Scorecard

Afghanistan; 125 (34.1 overs)	v	South Africa; 131/1 (28.4 overs)
Rashid Khan 35 (25); Imran Tahir 4/29 (7 overs)		Quinton de Kock 68 (72); Gulbadin Naib 1/29 (6 overs)

South Africa won by 9 wickets (DLS method)
Sophia Gardens, Cardiff
Umpires: Chris Gaffaney (NZ) and Ruchira Palliyaguruge (SL)
Player of the match: Imran Tahir (SA)

- South Africa won the toss and elected to field.
- South Africa were set a revised target of 127 runs from 48 overs due to rain.

18 June 2019
10:30
Scorecard

England; 397/6 (50 overs)	v	Afghanistan; 247/8 (50 overs)
Eoin Morgan 148 (71); Gulbadin Naib 3/68 (10 overs)		Hashmatullah Shahidi 76 (100); Jofra Archer 3/52 (10 overs)

England won by 150 runs
Old Trafford, Manchester
Umpires: Paul Reiffel (Aus) and Joel Wilson (WI)
Player of the match: Eoin Morgan (Eng)

- England won the toss and elected to bat.
- Eoin Morgan scored the fastest century by an England batsman in a World Cup match (57 balls), and he also scored the most sixes in an innings in ODIs (17), breaking the record of 16 sixes jointly held by Rohit Sharma (IND), AB de Villiers (SA) and Chris Gayle (WI).
- England scored the most sixes in an innings by a team in ODIs (25), and posted their highest team total in a Cricket World Cup match.
- Rashid Khan (Afg) bowled the second most expensive spell in a Cricket World Cup match, conceding 110 runs from his nine overs, becoming the most expensive spinner in ODIs.
- Hashmatullah Shahidi (Afg) scored his 1,000th run in ODIs.

22 June 2019
10:30
Scorecard

India; 224/8 (50 overs)	v	Afghanistan; 213 (49.5 overs)
Virat Kohli 67 (63); Mohammad Nabi 2/33 (9 overs)		Mohammad Nabi 52 (55); Mohammed Shami 4/40 (9.5 overs)

India won by 11 runs
Rose Bowl, Southampton
Umpires: Aleem Dar (Pak) and Richard Illingworth (Eng)
Player of the match: Jasprit Bumrah (Ind)

- India won the toss and elected to bat.
- Mohammed Shami (Ind) took a hat-trick becoming the first to do so in this World Cup.
- This was India's 50th win in the World Cup.
- Afghanistan were eliminated as a result of this match.

24 June 2019
10:30
Scorecard

Bangladesh; 262/7 (50 overs)	v	Afghanistan; 200 (47 overs)
Mushfiqur Rahim 83 (87); Mujeeb Ur Rahman 3/39 (10 overs)		Samiullah Shinwari 49 (51); Shakib Al Hasan 5/29 (10 overs)

Bangladesh won by 62 runs
Rose Bowl, Southampton
Umpires: Michael Gough (Eng) and Richard Kettleborough (Eng)
Player of the match: Shakib Al Hasan (Ban)

- Afghanistan won the toss and elected to field.
- Soumya Sarkar (Ban) played in his 50th ODI.
- Gulbadin Naib played in his 100th international match for Afghanistan, and scored his 1,000th run in ODIs.
- Shakib Al Hasan became the first batsman for Bangladesh to score 1,000 runs in the Cricket World Cup, and the first bowler for Bangladesh to take a five-wicket haul in a World Cup match.
- Shakib Al Hasan also became the second cricketer, after Yuvraj Singh, to score 50 runs and take five wickets in the same match at the World Cup.
- Shakib Al Hasan became the only player to score 1,000 runs and pick up 30 wickets in the World Cup, and the only player to score 400 runs and take 10 wickets in a single tournament.

29 June 2019
10:30
Scorecard

Afghanistan; 227/9 (50 overs)	v	Pakistan; 230/7 (49.4 overs)
Asghar Afghan 42 (35); Shaheen Afridi 4/47 (10 overs)		Imad Wasim 49* (54); Mohammad Nabi 2/23 (10 overs)

Pakistan won by 3 wickets
Headingley, Leeds
Umpires: Nigel Llong (Eng) and Paul Wilson (Aus)
Player of the match: Imad Wasim (Pak)

- Afghanistan won the toss and elected to bat.
- Mohammad Nabi (Afg) took his 200th wicket in international cricket.

4 July 2019
10:30
Scorecard

West Indies; 311/6 (50 overs)	v	Afghanistan; 288 (50 overs)
Shai Hope 77 (92); Dawlat Zadran 2/73 (9 overs)		Ikram Alikhil 86 (93); Carlos Brathwaite 4/63 (9 overs)

West Indies won by 23 runs
Headingley, Leeds
Umpires: Chris Gaffaney (NZ) and Nigel Llong (Eng)
Player of the match: Shai Hope (WI)

- West Indies won the toss and elected to bat.
- Chris Gayle became the most-capped player for the West Indies in the Cricket World Cup, playing in his 35th match.
- Chris Gayle also equalled Brian Lara's record of playing in 295 ODIs for the West Indies.

=== 2023 Cricket World Cup ===
The 2023 World Cup was the 3rd World Cup in which Afghanistan participated. The format remained same as previous edition. Afghanistan achieved landmark wins in the tournament, defeating traditional powerhouses England, Pakistan and Sri Lanka, they also won against Netherlands thus finishing their campaign at 6th place with 4 wins.

Squad

- Hashmatullah Shahidi (c)
- Rahmanullah Gurbaz (wk)
- Ikram Alikhil (wk)
- Ibrahim Zadran
- Rahmat Shah
- Najibullah Zadran
- Mohammad Nabi
- Azmatullah Omarzai
- Riaz Hassan
- Rashid Khan
- Mujeeb Ur Rahman
- Noor Ahmad
- Fazalhaq Farooqi
- Abdul Rahman
- Naveen-ul-Haq

Results

League stage										Semifinal	Final	Overall Result
Opposition Result	Opposition Result	Opposition Result	Opposition Result	Opposition Result	Opposition Result	Opposition Result	Opposition Result	Opposition Result	Rank	Opposition Result	Opposition Result	Overall Result
Bangladesh; L by 6 wickets	India; L by 8 wickets	England; W by 69 runs	New Zealand; L by 149 runs	Pakistan; W by 8 wickets	Sri Lanka; W by 7 wickets	Netherlands; W by 7 wickets	Australia; L by 3 wickets	South Africa; L by 5 wickets	6	Did not advance		League stage

Scorecards

League stage

7 October 2023
10:30
Scorecard

Afghanistan; 156 (37.2 overs)	v	Bangladesh; 158/4 (34.4 overs)
Rahmanullah Gurbaz 47 (62); Mehidy Hasan 3/25 (9 overs)		Nazmul Hossain Shanto 59* (83); Azmatullah Omarzai 1/9 (2 overs)

Bangladesh won by 6 wickets
Himachal Pradesh Cricket Association Stadium, Dharamshala
Umpires: Kumar Dharmasena (SL) and Joel Wilson (WI)
Player of the match: Mehidy Hasan (Ban)

- Bangladesh won the toss and elected to field.
- Rahmanullah Gurbaz became the fastest player to score reach 1,000 runs in ODIs for Afghanistan in terms of innings (27).
- Bangladesh won the match with 92 balls to spare, their greatest win margin in the World Cups, in terms of balls remaining.

11 October 2023
14:00 (D/N)
Scorecard

Afghanistan; 272/8 (50 overs)	v	India; 273/2 (35 overs)
Hashmatullah Shahidi 80 (88); Jasprit Bumrah 4/39 (10 overs)		Rohit Sharma 131 (84); Rashid Khan 2/57 (8 overs)

India won by 8 wickets
Arun Jaitley Cricket Stadium, New Delhi
Umpires: Michael Gough (Eng) and Paul Reiffel (Aus)
Player of the match: Rohit Sharma (Ind)

- Afghanistan won the toss and elected to bat.
- Rohit Sharma (Ind) broke Chris Gayle’s record for most sixes in international cricket (554).
- Rohit Sharma broke Sachin Tendulkar's record for most centuries in World Cup history (7).

15 October 2023
14:00 (D/N)
Scorecard

Afghanistan; 284 (49.5 overs)	v	England; 215 (40.3 overs)
Rahmanullah Gurbaz 80 (57); Adil Rashid 3/42 (10 overs)		Harry Brook 66 (61); Rashid Khan 3/37 (9.3 overs)

Afghanistan won by 69 runs
Arun Jaitley Cricket Stadium, New Delhi
Umpires: Sharfuddoula (Ban) and Rod Tucker (Aus)
Player of the match: Mujeeb Ur Rahman (Afg)

- England won the toss and elected to field.
- Mohammad Nabi and Rahmat Shah (Afg) played their 150th and 100th ODI respectively.
- This was Afghanistan's first win against England in international cricket.

18 October 2023
14:00 (D/N)
Scorecard

New Zealand; 288/6 (50 overs)	v	Afghanistan; 139 (34.4 overs)
Glenn Phillips 71 (80); Naveen-ul-Haq 2/48 (8 overs)		Rahmat Shah 36 (62); Lockie Ferguson 3/19 (7 overs)

New Zealand won by 149 runs
M. A. Chidambaram Stadium, Chennai
Umpires: Joel Wilson (WI) and Paul Wilson (Aus)
Player of the match: Glenn Phillips (NZ)

- Afghanistan won the toss and elected to field.
- Mitchell Santner (NZ) took his 100th wicket in ODIs.

23 October 2023
14:00 (D/N)
Scorecard

Pakistan; 282/7 (50 overs)	v	Afghanistan; 286/2 (49 overs)
Babar Azam 74 (92); Noor Ahmad 3/49 (10 overs)		Ibrahim Zadran 87 (113); Hasan Ali 1/44 (10 overs)

Afghanistan won by 8 wickets
M. A. Chidambaram Stadium, Chennai
Umpires: Paul Reiffel (Aus) and Rod Tucker (Aus)
Player of the match: Ibrahim Zadran (Afg)

- Pakistan won the toss and elected to bat.
- This was Afghanistan's first win against Pakistan in ODI cricket.

30 October 2023
14:00 (D/N)
Scorecard

Sri Lanka; 241 (49.3 overs)	v	Afghanistan; 242/3 (45.2 overs)
Pathum Nissanka 46 (60); Fazalhaq Farooqi 4/34 (10 overs)		Azmatullah Omarzai 73* (63); Dilshan Madushanka 2/48 (9 overs)

Afghanistan won by 7 wickets
Maharashtra Cricket Association Stadium, Pune
Umpires: Chris Gaffaney (NZ) and Richard Illingworth (Eng)
Player of the match: Fazalhaq Farooqi (Afg)

- Afghanistan won the toss and elected to field.
- Rashid Khan (Afg) played in his 100th ODI.
- Hashmatullah Shahidi (Afg) scored his 2,000th run in ODIs.
- This was Afghanistan's first win against Sri Lanka in the Cricket World Cup.

3 November 2023
14:00 (D/N)
Scorecard

Netherlands; 179 (46.3 overs)	v	Afghanistan; 181/3 (31.3 overs)
Sybrand Engelbrecht 58 (86); Mohammad Nabi 3/28 (9.3 overs)		Hashmatullah Shahidi 56* (64); Saqib Zulfiqar 1/25 (3 overs)

Afghanistan won by 7 wickets
Ekana Cricket Stadium, Lucknow
Umpires: Nitin Menon (Ind) and Sharfuddoula (Ban)
Player of the match: Mohammad Nabi (Afg)

- Netherlands won the toss and elected to bat.
- Mujeeb Ur Rahman (Afg) took his 100th wicket in ODIs.
- Afghanistan qualified for the 2025 ICC Champions Trophy as a result of this match. It would be their first appearance in the tournament.

7 November 2023
14:00 (D/N)
Scorecard

Afghanistan; 291/5 (50 overs)	v	Australia; 293/7 (46.5 overs)
Ibrahim Zadran 129* (143); Josh Hazlewood 2/39 (9 overs)		Glenn Maxwell 201* (128); Rashid Khan 2/44 (10 overs)

Australia won by 3 wickets
Wankhede Stadium, Mumbai
Umpires: Michael Gough (Eng) and Alex Wharf (Eng)
Player of the match: Glenn Maxwell (Aus)

- Afghanistan won the toss and elected to bat.
- Ibrahim Zadran became the first Afghan batter to score a century at the Cricket World Cup.
- Glenn Maxwell's 201 was the highest individual score by an Australian cricketer, surpassing Shane Watson's 185, and for a batter at number three or lower, surpassing Charles Coventry's (Zim) 194, in ODIs. It was also the highest individual score batting second in ODIs.
- The 202-run stand between Glenn Maxwell and Pat Cummins (Aus) was the highest 8th wicket partnership in ODIs, surpassing Andrew Hall and Justin Kemp's 138 against India in 2006.
- Australia qualified for the semi-finals as a result of this match.

10 November 2023
14:00 (D/N)
Scorecard

Afghanistan; 244 (50 overs)	v	South Africa; 247/5 (47.3 overs)
Azmatullah Omarzai 97* (107); Gerald Coetzee 4/44 (10 overs)		Rassie van der Dussen 76* (95); Mohammad Nabi 2/35 (10 overs)

South Africa won by 5 wickets
Narendra Modi Stadium, Ahmedabad
Umpires: Chris Brown (NZ) and Nitin Menon (Ind)
Player of the match: Rassie van der Dussen (SA)

- Afghanistan won the toss and elected to bat.
- Heinrich Klaasen and Kagiso Rabada (SA) played their 50th and 100th ODI respectively.
- Naveen-ul-Haq (Afg) played in his last ODI.
- Afghanistan were eliminated as a result of this match.

== Records and statistics ==
=== Team records ===
Highest innings totals

Score	Opponent	Venue	Season
291/5 (50 overs)	Australia	Mumbai	2023
288 (50 overs)	West Indies	Leeds	2019
286/2 (49 overs)	Pakistan	Chennai	2023
284 (49.5 overs)	England	Delhi	2023
272/8 (50 overs)	India	Delhi	2023
Last updated: 10 November 2023

=== Most appearances ===
This list consists players with most number of matches at the Cricket World Cup. Mohammad Nabi played a total of 24 World Cup matches, the most for the team. Gulbadin Naib and Hashmatullah Shahidi have captained the team in 9 matches, sharing the record for most matches as captain.

Matches	Player	Period
24	Mohammad Nabi	2015–2023
18	Rahmat Shah	2019–2023
18	Rashid Khan	2019–2023
17	Hashmatullah Shahidi	2019–2023
16	Mujeeb Ur Rahman	2019–2023
16	Najibullah Zadran	2015–2023
Last updated: 10 November 2023

=== Batting statistics ===
Most runs

Runs	Player	Mat	Inn	Avg	100s	50s	Period
574	Rahmat Shah	18	18	33.76	—N/a	4	2019–2023
507	Hashmatullah Shahidi	17	17	36.21	—N/a	5	2019–2023
376	Ibrahim Zadran	9	9	47.00	1	1	2023–2023
360	Najibullah Zadran	16	16	24.00	—N/a	2	2015–2023
353	Azmatullah Omarzai	9	8	70.60	—N/a	3	2023–2023
Last updated: 10 November 2023

Highest individual innings

Score	Player	Opponent	Venue	Season
129*	Ibrahim Zadran	Australia	Mumbai	2023
97*	Azmatullah Omarzai	South Africa	Ahmedabad	2023
96	Samiullah Shinwari	Scotland	Dunedin	2015
87	Ibrahim Zadran	Pakistan	Chennai	2023
70*	Ikram Alikhil	West Indies	Leeds	2019
Last updated: 10 November 2023

Highest partnerships

Runs	Players	Opposition	Venue	Season
133 (2nd wicket)	Rahmat Shah (62) & Ikram Alikhil (67)	v West Indies	Leeds	2019
130 (1st wicket)	Rahmanullah Gurbaz (65) & Ibrahim Zadran (62)	v Pakistan	Chennai	2023
121 (4th wicket)	Hashmatullah Shahidi (56) & Azmatullah Omarzai (62)	v India	Delhi	2023
114 (1st wicket)	Rahmanullah Gurbaz (75) & Ibrahim Zadran (28)	v England	Delhi	2023
111* (4th wicket)	Hashmatullah Shahidi (33*) & Azmatullah Omarzai (73*)	v Sri Lanka	Pune	2023
Last updated: 10 November 2023

=== Bowling statistics ===
Most wickets

Wickets	Player	Matches	Avg.	Econ.	4W	5W	Period
21	Mohammad Nabi	24	40.47	4.72	2	0	2015–2023
17	Rashid Khan	18	47.29	5.07	0	0	2019–2023
15	Mujeeb Ur Rahman	16	47.80	5.13	0	0	2019–2023
14	Dawlat Zadran	10	38.28	6.70	0	0	2015–2019
10	Shapoor Zadran	6	26.50	5.19	1	0	2015–2015
10	Gulbadin Naib	10	47.30	6.33	0	0	2015–2019
Last updated: 10 November 2023

Best bowling figures

Bowling Figures	Overs	Player	Opponent	Venue	Season
4/30	9.0	Mohammad Nabi	v Sri Lanka	Cardiff	2019
4/34	10.0	Fazalhaq Farooqi	v Sri Lanka	Pune	2023
4/38	10.0	Shapoor Zadran	v Scotland	Dunedin	2015
3/28	9.3	Mohammad Nabi	v Netherlands	Lucknow	2023
3/29	10.0	Dawlat Zadran	v Scotland	Dunedin	2015
Last updated: 10 November 2023

== See also ==
- Afghanistan national cricket team
- Cricket in Afghanistan
