= Irish cricket team against Afghanistan in Sri Lanka in 2009–10 =

Irish cricket team against Afghanistan in Sri Lanka in 2010
	Ireland	Afghanistan
- Dates: 21 January – 4 February 2010

The Ireland cricket team played the Afghanistan national cricket team in 2010 in Sri Lanka. Owing to the security situation in Afghanistan, they are unable to play home games in their own country, and so play home series in various locations in the Middle East and Indian subcontinent. The teams played an Intercontinental Cup match, and also played in a 4 team Twenty20 series.

== Intercontinental Cup Match ==
21 – 24 January
Scorecard

Ireland	v	Afghanistan
405 (98 overs); WTS Porterfield 78 (134); Samiullah Shenwari 4/75 [27]		474 (153.2 overs); Mohammad Shahzad 88 (121); AR White 4/99 [31.2]
202 (75.3 overs); DT Johnston 63* (91); Dawlat Ahmadzai 5/52 [15]		137/3 (31.3 overs); Noor Ali Zadran 57 (75); DT Johnston 1/13 [4]

Afghanistan won by 7 wickets
Rangiri Dambulla International Stadium, Dambulla, Sri Lanka
Umpires: R Martinesz (SL) & TH Wijewardene (SL)

- Points: Afghanistan 20, Ireland 0

== Twenty20 Internationals ==
Afghanistan and Ireland participated in two Twenty20 tournaments during this period:

- A quadrangular Twenty20 tournament in Sri Lanka, together with Canada and Sri Lanka A. Ireland and Afghanistan played one game.
- World Twenty20 Qualifier in the UAE, in which the two were drawn in the same group and played one game. The two also reached the final.

=== Quadrangular Series ===
1 February 2010
Scorecard

Afghanistan; 121/9 (20 overs)	v	Ireland; 124/5 (18.1 overs)
Raees Ahmadzai 33* (36); DT Johnston 4/22 [4]		WTS Porterfield 46 (30); Karim Sadiq 2/17 [4]

Ireland won by 5 wickets
P Sara Oval, Colombo, Sri Lanka
Umpires: R Martinesz (SL) & TH Wijewardene (SL)

- Afghanistan won the toss and elected to bat.

=== World Twenty20 Qualifier ===
9 February 2010
Group A
Scorecard

Afghanistan; 139/8 (20 overs)	v	Ireland; 126 (19.2 overs)
Mohammad Nabi 43* (25); DT Johnston 2/18 [4]		WTS Porterfield 35 (23); Karim Sadiq 3/17 [3]

Afghanistan won by 13 runs
Dubai Sports City Cricket Stadium, Dubai
Umpires: JJ Luck (Nam) and SR Modi (Ken)
Player of the match: Mohammad Nabi (Afg)

13 February
Final
Scorecard

Ireland; 142/8 (20 overs)	v	Afghanistan; 147/2 (17.3 overs)
AR Cusack 28 (22); Nowroz Mangal 3/23 [4]		Mohammad Shahzad 65* (46); KJ O'Brien 1/16 (2 overs)

Afghanistan won by 8 wickets
Dubai Sports City Cricket Stadium, Dubai
Umpires: PK Baldwin (Ger) and Sarika Prasad (Sin)
Player of the match: Mohammad Shahzad (Afg)
