= 2010 Quadrangular Twenty20 Series in Sri Lanka =

Cricket tournament

- Cricket format: Twenty20 International and Twenty20
- Tournament format: Round Robin
- Host: Sri Lanka
- Champions: Sri Lanka A
- Participants: 4
- Matches: 6
- Most runs: 127 – Niall O'Brien (IRE)
- Most wickets: 11 – Andre Botha (IRE) & Hameed Hasan (AFG)

2010 Quadrangular Twenty20 Series in Sri Lanka was a Twenty20 cricket tournament held in Sri Lanka from 1 to 4 February 2010. The four participating teams were Afghanistan, Canada, Ireland and Sri Lanka A. The matches were played in Colombo.

== Squads ==
Afghanistan	Canada	Ireland	Sri Lanka A
Nowroz Mangal (Captain); Asghar Afghan; Dawlat Ahmadzai; Hameed Hasan; Karim Sadiq; Mirwais Ashraf; Mohammad Nabi; Mohammad Shahzad (Wicketkeeper); Noor Ali; Obaidullah Kunari; Raees Ahmadzai; Samiullah Shenwari; Shafiqullah Shafiq; Shapoor Zadran; Kabir Khan (Coach)	Ashish Bagai (Captain/Wicketkeeper); Hiral Patel; Rizwan Cheema; Harvir Baidwan; Geoff Barnett; Trevin Bastiampillai; Umar Bhatti; Ian Billcliff; John Davison; Sunil Dhaniram; Sandeep Jyoti; Shaheed Keshvani; Khurram Chohan; Henry Osinde; Saad Bin Zafar; Abdool Samad; Usman Limbada; Pubudu Dassanayake (Coach)	William Porterfield (Captain); Andre Botha; Peter Connell; Alex Cusack; George Dockrell; Trent Johnston; Nigel Jones; Gary Kidd; John Mooney; Kevin O'Brien; Niall O'Brien; Paul Stirling; Andrew White; Gary Wilson (Wicketkeeper)	Kaushal Silva (Captain/Wicketkeeper); Nuwan Pradeep; Chinthaka Jayasinghe; Chamara Kapugedera; Dimuth Karunaratne; Kosala Kulasekera; Farveez Maharoof; Jeewan Mendis; Tharanga Paranavitana; Seekkugge Prasanna; Gihan Rupasinghe; Sachithra Senanayake; Milinda Siriwardana; Isuru Udana; Mahela Udawatte; Chaminda Vidanapathirana

== Round Robin stage ==
=== Points Table ===
Pos	Team	P	W	L	NR	T	Points	NRR	For	Against
1	Sri Lanka A	3	3	0	0	0	6	+2.491	447/51.2	373/60
2	Canada	3	1	2	0	0	2	+0.366	409/60	409/52.5
3	Ireland	3	1	2	0	0	2	−0.063	470/58.1	475/58.2
4	Afghanistan	3	1	2	0	0	2	−1.363	370/59.5	439/58.1

=== Matches ===
1 February 2010
Scorecard

Canada; 93/6 (20 overs)	v	Sri Lanka A 94/1 (13 overs)
A Bagai 25 (31); S Prasanna 3/13 [4]		TAM Siriwardana 54* (40); Khurram Chohan 1/14 [2]

Sri Lanka A won by 9 wickets.
P Sara Oval, Colombo
Umpires: AG Dissanayake (SL) & ID Gunawardene (SL)

- Sri Lanka A won the toss and elected to field.
- Points: Sri Lanka A 2, Canada 0.

1 February 2010
Scorecard

Afghanistan; 121/9 (20 overs)	v	Ireland; 124/5 (18.1 overs)
Raees Ahmadzai 33* (36); DT Johnston 4/22 [4]		WTS Porterfield 46 (30); Karim Sadiq 2/17 [4]

Ireland won by 5 wickets.
P Sara Oval, Colombo
Umpires: R Martinesz (SL) & TH Wijewardene (SL)

- Afghanistan won the toss and elected to bat.
- Points: Ireland 2, Afghanistan 0.

3 February 2010
Scorecard

Canada; 176/3 (20 overs)	v	Ireland; 172/8 (20 overs)
H Patel 88* (61); A Botha 3/35 [4]		NJ O'Brien 50 (34); U Bhatti 3/26 [4]

Canada won by 4 runs.
Sinhalese Sports Club Ground, Colombo
Umpires: R Martinesz (SL) & TH Wijewardene (SL)

- Ireland won the toss and elected to field.
- Points: Canada 2, Ireland 0.

3 February 2010
Scorecard

Sri Lanka A 175/5 (20 overs)	v	Afghanistan; 106/8 (20 overs)
ML Udawatte 103* (67); Hamid Hassan 3/26 [4]		Mohammad Shahzad 56 (60); SMSM Senanayake 2/21 [4]

Sri Lanka A won by 69 runs.
Sinhalese Sports Club Ground, Colombo
Umpires: RD Kottahachchi (SL) & MSK Nandiweera (SL)

- Sri Lanka A won the toss and elected to bat.
- Points: Sri Lanka A 2, Afghanistan 0.

4 February 2010
Scorecard

Canada; 140/6 (20 overs)	v	Afghanistan; 143/3 (19.5 overs)
A Bagai 53 (42); Hamid Hassan 2/27 [4]		Karim Sadiq 42 (35); HS Baidwan 3/23 [3.5]

Afghanistan won by 5 wickets.
Sinhalese Sports Club Ground, Colombo
Umpires: HDPK Dharmasena (SL) & TH Wijewardene (SL)

- Canada won the toss and elected to bat.
- Points: Afghanistan 2, Canada 0.

4 February 2010
Scorecard

Ireland; 174/6 (20 overs)	v	Sri Lanka A 178/5 (18.2 overs)
NJ O'Brien 59 (38); CW Vidanapathirana 2/25 [4]		CU Jayasinghe 41* (27); AR Cusack 2/43 [3.2]

Sri Lanka A won by 5 wickets.
Sinhalese Sports Club Ground, Colombo
Umpires: ID Gunawardene (SL) & SH Sarathkumara (SL)

- Ireland won the toss and elected to bat.
- Points: Sri Lanka A 2, Ireland 0.
