= List of Afghanistan Twenty20 International cricketers =

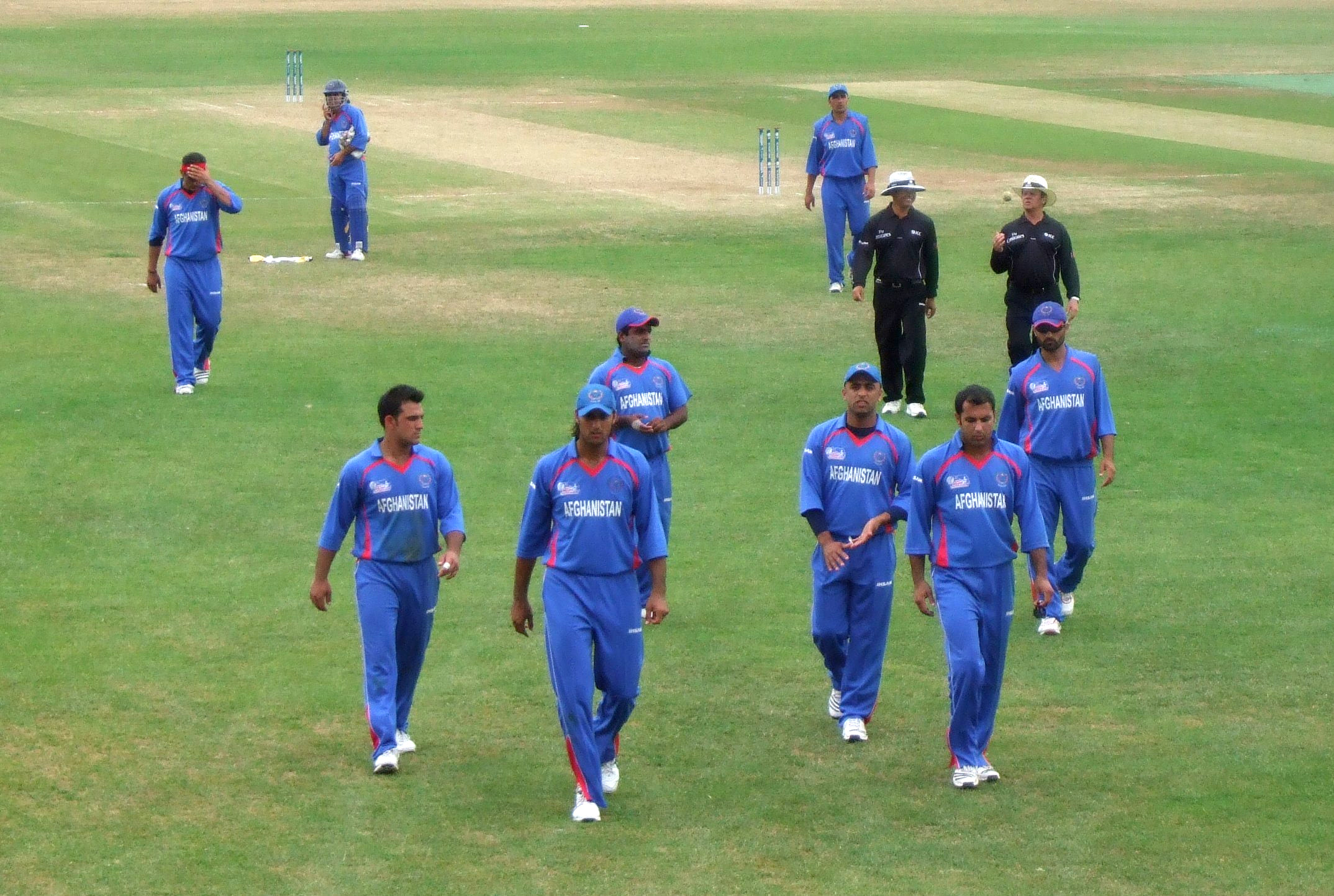
The Afghanistan national cricket team playing in Rotterdam in 2010 ICC WCL Division One

A T20I is an international cricket match between two teams that have official Twenty20 International status, as determined by the International Cricket Council. It is played under the rules of Twenty20 cricket and is the shortest form of the game. Afghanistan played its first T20I match on 1 February 2010, against Ireland, losing the match by 5 wickets. Their first win came three days later in their second T20I match, which was against Canada, with Afghanistan winning by 5 wickets with one ball remaining.

This list comprises all members of the Afghanistan cricket team who have played at least one T20I match. It is initially arranged in the order in which each player won his first Twenty20 cap. Where more than one player won his first Twenty20 cap in the same match, their surnames are listed alphabetically.

== Key ==
General

- ‡ – Captain
- † – Wicket-keeper
- First – Year of debut
- Last – Year of latest game
- Mat – Number of matches played

Batting

- Inn – Number of innings batted
- NO – Number of innings not out
- Runs – Runs scored in career
- HS – Highest score
- 100 – Centuries scored
- 50 – Half-centuries scored
- Avg – Runs scored per dismissal
- * – Batsman remained not out

Bowling

- Balls – Balls bowled in career
- Wkt – Wickets taken in career
- BBI – Best bowling in an innings
- Ave – Average runs per wicket

Fielding

- Ca – Catches taken
- St – Stumpings taken

== Players ==
Statistics are correct as of 19 February 2026.

Afghanistan T20I cricketers
General					Batting					Bowling				Fielding		Ref(s)
Cap	Name	First	Last	Mat	Runs	HS	50	100	Avg	Balls	Wkt	BBI	Ave	Ca	St	Ref(s)
1	Asghar Afghan ‡	2010	2021	75	1,382	62	4	0	21.93	4	1	1/4	4.00	20	0	
2	Dawlat Ahmadzai	2010	2010	2	2	2*	0	0	–	24	2	1/21	23.00	0	0	
3	Hamid Hassan	2010	2021	25	50	22	0	0	16.66	544	35	4/22	16.57	3	0	
4	Karim Sadiq	2010	2018	36	538	72	1	0	14.94	420	14	3/17	34.42	6	0	
5	Mohammad Nabi ‡	2010	2026	152	2,448	89	7	0	22.25	2,482	109	4/7	27.77	82	0	
6	Mohammad Shahzad †	2010	2023	73	2,048	118*	12	1	29.95	–	–	–	–	33	28	
7	Nawroz Mangal ‡	2010	2015	32	505	65*	2	0	18.03	60	4	3/23	20.00	16	0	
8	Raees Ahmadzai	2010	2010	8	91	33*	0	0	30.33	–	–	–	–	2	0	
9	Samiullah Shenwari	2010	2022	65	1,013	61	2	0	22.02	634	28	5/13	24.57	19	0	
10	Shafiqullah †	2010	2019	46	494	51*	1	0	16.46	–	–	–	–	14	2	
11	Shapoor Zadran	2010	2020	36	27	13	0	0	3.85	695	37	3/40	24.51	5	0	
12	Mirwais Ashraf	2010	2016	25	128	28*	0	0	11.63	392	14	2/6	31.71	5	0	
13	Noor Ali Zadran	2010	2023	23	597	63	4	0	27.13	–	–	–	–	4	0	
14	Dawlat Zadran	2012	2019	34	68	13	0	0	7.55	741	40	4/44	24.50	7	0	
15	Gulbadin Naib ‡	2012	2026	85	1,070	63	4	0	20.57	697	35	4/20	26.42	31	0	
16	Izatullah Dawlatzai (Note: Izatullah Dawlatzai has also played Twenty20 International cricket for Germany. Only his record for Afghanistan is given above.)	2012	2012	4	0	0*	0	0	–	72	6	3/33	22.33	1	0	
17	Javed Ahmadi	2012	2017	3	6	6	0	0	3.00	–	–	–	–	0	0	
18	Shabir Noori	2012	2012	1	15	15	0	0	15.00	–	–	–	–	0	0	
19	Zamir Khan	2012	2012	1	–	–	–	–	–	24	1	1/26	26.00	0	0	
20	Aftab Alam	2012	2018	12	2	1*	0	0	1.00	245	11	2/23	29.45	3	0	
21	Najibullah Zadran	2012	2024	107	1,830	73	8	0	29.51	–	–	–	–	44	0	
22	Amir Hamza	2013	2021	33	40	21	0	0	10.00	666	30	3/39	25.06	1	0	
23	Hashmatullah Shahidi	2013	2022	6	48	36	0	0	24.00	–	–	–	–	1	0	
24	Afsar Zazai †	2013	2023	8	141	48	0	0	17.62	–	–	–	–	0	2	
25	Najeeb Tarakai	2014	2019	12	258	90	1	0	21.50	–	–	–	–	3	0	
26	Sharafuddin Ashraf	2015	2025	23	63	18	0	0	10.50	354	12	3/24	36.66	4	0	
27	Rashid Khan ‡ (Note: Rashid Khan has also played Twenty20 International cricket for the ICC World XI. Only his record for Afghanistan is given above.)	2015	2026	114	613	48*	0	0	14.95	2,606	191	5/3	13.62	45	0	
28	Usman Ghani	2015	2023	35	786	73	4	0	25.35	–	–	–	–	15	0	
29	Nasim Baras	2015	2015	3	1	1	0	0	1.00	48	2	1/11	28.00	3	0	
30	Rokhan Barakzai	2015	2015	3	–	–	–	–	–	60	6	2/21	12.50	0	0	
31	Sayed Shirzad	2015	2019	4	1	1	0	0	1.00	90	7	3/16	16.57	1	0	
32	Yamin Ahmadzai	2015	2015	2	1	1*	0	0	–	43	5	3/34	13.00	0	0	
33	Fareed Ahmad	2016	2025	38	33	24*	0	0	16.50	697	47	3/14	21.40	6	0	
34	Karim Janat	2016	2025	75	759	56*	4	0	16.86	847	42	5/11	27.64	17	0	
35	Hazratullah Zazai	2016	2024	45	1,160	162*	3	1	27.61	–	–	–	–	7	0	
36	Mujeeb Ur Rahman	2018	2026	65	85	23*	0	0	9.44	1,450	87	5/20	18.10	17	0	
37	Ziaur Rahman	2019	2026	6	–	–	–	–	–	132	7	3/36	31.85	4	0	
38	Rahmanullah Gurbaz †	2019	2026	87	2,280	100	13	1	26.20	–	–	–	–	51	4	
39	Fazal Niazai	2019	2019	1	12	12	0	0	12.00	6	0	–	–	0	0	
40	Naveen-ul-Haq	2019	2024	48	44	13	0	0	4.88	967	67	4/20	18.73	10	0	
41	Ibrahim Zadran ‡	2019	2026	65	1,865	87*	16	0	33.30	–	–	–	–	30	0	
42	Qais Ahmad	2020	2025	12	33	18	0	0	6.60	210	17	3/16	14.17	8	0	
43	Fazalhaq Farooqi	2021	2026	56	17	4*	0	0	4.25	1,137	66	5/9	20.16	7	0	
44	Azmatullah Omarzai	2022	2026	66	808	53	1	0	17.95	974	54	4/9	24.59	21	0	
45	Darwish Rasooli ‡	2022	2026	28	515	84	4	0	22.39	–	–	–	–	9	0	
46	Nijat Masood	2022	2022	3	4	4*	0	0	–	66	4	3/39	23.75	1	0	
47	Ihsanullah	2022	2022	1	20	20	0	0	20.00	–	–	–	–	0	0	
48	Noor Ahmad	2022	2026	26	85	15*	0	0	9.44	480	20	4/10	29.85	5	0	
49	Zahir Khan	2023	2023	4	0	0	0	0	0.00	48	3	2/20	16.66	0	0	
50	Sediqullah Atal	2023	2026	29	621	73*	4	0	23.00	–	–	–	–	13	0	
51	Wafadar Momand	2023	2024	2	–	–	–	–	–	31	0	–	–	0	0	
52	Shahidullah	2023	2026	7	104	49*	0	0	26.00	18	1	1/13	31.00	4	0	
53	Zubaid Akbari	2023	2025	4	12	5	0	0	3.00	12	0	–	–	2	0	
54	Rahmat Shah	2024	2024	1	3	3	0	0	3.00	–	–	–	–	0	0	
55	Mohammad Saleem	2024	2024	1	–	–	–	–	–	18	0	–	–	0	0	
56	Mohammad Ishaq †	2024	2025	8	104	32	0	0	14.85	–	–	–	–	4	0	
57	Ijaz Ahmad Ahmadzai	2024	2025	4	41	16	0	0	10.25	–	–	–	–	0	0	
58	Nangialai Kharoti	2024	2025	7	30	23*	0	0	15.00	72	5	2/16	15.60	1	0	
59	Allah Mohammad Ghazanfar	2025	2025	5	7	7	0	0	2.33	96	2	1/9	48.00	2	0	
60	Abdollah Ahmadzai	2025	2026	9	6	6*	0	0	6.00	172	13	3/42	19.76	4	0	
61	Wafiullah Tarakhil	2025	2025	2	12	11	0	0	6.00	18	0	–	–	0	0	
62	Bashir Ahmad	2025	2025	1	2	2*	0	0	–	18	0	–	–	0	0	
63	Bilal Sami	2025	2025	1	–	–	–	–	–	24	1	1/31	31.00	0	0	
64	Farmanullah Safi	2025	2025	1	12	12	0	0	12.00	18	2	2/19	9.50	0	0	
65	Imran Mir	2025	2025	1	5	5	0	0	5.00	–	–	–	–	1	0	

== See also ==
- List of Afghanistan Test cricketers
- List of Afghanistan ODI cricketers
- List of Afghanistan first-class cricketers
- List of Afghanistan Twenty20 International cricket records
