= List of Afghanistan ODI cricketers =

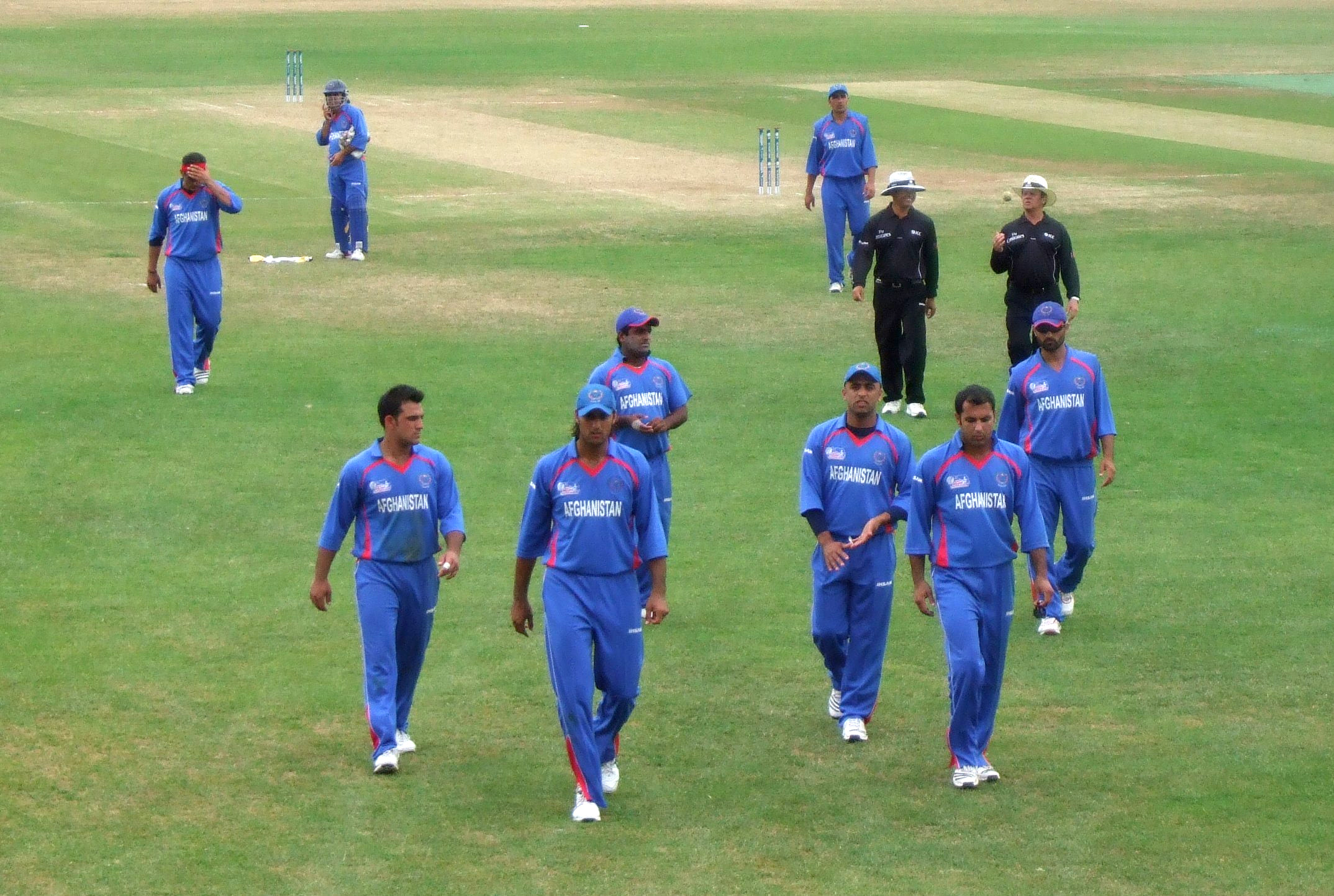
Afghanistan national cricket team at Rotterdam, 2010 ICC WCL Division One

Since their first match in 2009, 64 players have represented the Afghanistan national cricket team in One Day Internationals (ODIs). A One Day International is an international cricket match between two representative teams, each having ODI status, as determined by the International Cricket Council (ICC). An ODI differs from Test matches in that the number of overs per team is limited, and that each team has only one innings.

The Afghanistan Cricket Federation was formed in 1995, but cricket was banned by the Taliban until 2000. When the ban was lifted, the team experienced a "meteoric rise through international cricket". They were admitted to the ICC as an affiliate member in 2001, and in 2006 played and beat the Marylebone Cricket Club in Mumbai. Later in 2006 they toured England, winning six out of seven matches against county second XI teams. They joined the World Cricket League in 2008, winning Divisions Five and Four in their inaugural years, and the following year won Division Three. In 2009, Afghanistan narrowly missed out on a place in the 2011 Cricket World Cup, finishing fifth in the 2009 ICC World Cup Qualifier. Their final position earnt them ODI status, and the opportunity to take part in the four-day ICC Intercontinental Cup. Their first ODI was the fifth-place play-off of the 2009 World Cup Qualifier against Scotland, which they won by 89 runs.

This list includes all players who have played at least one ODI match and is initially arranged in the order of debut appearance. Where more than one player won their first caps in the same match, their surnames are listed alphabetically.

== Key ==
General

- ‡ – Captain
- † – Wicket-keeper
- First – Year of debut
- Last – Year of latest game
- Mat – Number of matches played

Batting

- Runs – Runs scored in career
- HS – Highest score
- Avg – Runs scored per dismissal
- * – Batsman remained not out
- 100 – Number of centuries scored
- 50 – Number of half centuries scored

Bowling

- Balls – Balls bowled in career
- Wkt – Wickets taken in career
- BBI – Best bowling in an innings
- Ave – Average runs per wicket
- 5WI – Five wickets or more in a match

Fielding

- Ca – Catches taken
- St – Stumpings taken

== Players ==
Statistics are correct as of 20 June 2026.

Afghanistan ODI cricketers
General					Batting					Bowling					Fielding		Ref
No.	Name	First	Last	Mat	Runs	HS	Avg	50	100	Balls	Wkt	BBI	Ave	5WI	Ca	St	Ref
1	Asghar Afghan ‡	2009	2021	114	2,424	101	24.73	12	1	139	3	1/1	30.33	0	24	0	
2	Dawlat Ahmadzai	2009	2010	3	–	–	–	–	–	112	1	1/40	121.00	0	0	0	
3	Hamid Hassan	2009	2019	38	107	17	6.68	0	0	1,734	59	5/45	22.54	1	5	0	
4	Hasti Gul	2009	2009	2	23	23*	–	0	0	114	3	2/48	24.33	0	0	0	
5	Karim Sadiq ‡†	2009	2016	24	475	114*	23.75	0	2	320	6	2/10	33.50	0	6	0	
6	Khaliq Dad	2009	2010	6	40	20	13.33	0	0	252	9	3/30	16.66	0	0	0	
7	Mohammad Nabi ‡	2009	2026	178	3,792	136	27.47	18	2	8,054	177	5/17	32.80	1	85	0	
8	Nawroz Mangal ‡	2009	2016	49	1,139	129	27.11	4	2	293	8	3/35	29.37	0	19	0	
9	Noor Ali Zadran	2009	2019	51	1,216	114	24.81	7	1	–	–	–	–	–	15	0	
10	Raees Ahmadzai	2009	2010	5	88	39	29.33	0	0	24	0	–	–	0	2	0	
11	Samiullah Shenwari	2009	2019	84	1,811	96	29.20	11	0	2,111	46	4/31	37.58	0	21	0	
12	Ahmed Shah	2009	2009	1	2	2	2.00	0	0	6	0	–	–	0	0	0	
13	Mirwais Ashraf	2009	2016	46	387	52*	14.33	1	0	2,009	46	4/35	29.56	0	8	0	
14	Mohammad Shahzad †	2009	2019	84	2,727	131*	33.66	14	6	–	–	–	–	–	64	25	
15	Shapoor Zadran	2009	2019	44	67	17	6.70	0	0	1,983	43	4/24	36.95	0	5	0	
16	Shafiqullah †	2009	2018	24	430	56	22.63	2	0	–	–	–	–	–	11	3	
17	Aftab Alam	2010	2019	27	80	16*	11.42	0	0	1,257	41	4/25	25.19	0	6	0	
18	Shabir Noori	2010	2016	10	191	94	19.10	1	0	–	–	–	–	–	6	0	
19	Javed Ahmadi	2010	2021	47	1049	81	23.84	7	0	452	9	4/37	40.33	0	11	0	
20	Noor-ul-Haq	2010	2010	2	12	12	6.00	0	0	–	–	–	–	–	1	0	
21	Abdullah Mazari	2010	2010	2	3	3	3.00	0	0	96	2	1/18	24.50	0	1	0	
22	Izatullah Dawlatzai	2010	2015	5	7	6*	3.50	0	0	210	8	4/38	18.25	0	1	0	
23	Dawlat Zadran	2011	2019	82	513	47*	17.68	0	0	3,769	115	4/22	29.76	0	16	0	
24	Gulbadin Naib ‡	2011	2025	89	1,332	82*	19.88	5	0	2,883	74	6/43	36.16	1	28	0	
25	Amir Hamza	2012	2017	31	23	7	3.28	0	0	1,552	40	4/17	25.40	0	10	0	
26	Zakiullah Zaki	2012	2012	1	3	3*	–	0	0	24	0	–	–	0	0	0	
27	Najibullah Zadran	2012	2023	92	2,060	104*	29.01	15	1	30	0	–	–	0	40	0	
28	Mohibullah Oryakhel	2013	2013	2	–	–	–	–	–	–	–	–	–	–	2	0	
29	Rahmat Shah	2013	2026	128	4,121	114	35.22	33	5	543	15	5/32	35.46	1	29	0	
30	Hashmatullah Shahidi ‡	2013	2026	96	2,607	102	33.42	22	1	48	0	–	–	0	20	0	
31	Usman Ghani	2014	2022	17	435	118	25.58	2	1	38	1	1/21	34.00	0	3	0	
32	Sharafuddin Ashraf	2014	2024	20	70	21	8.75	0	0	884	13	3/29	50.153	0	6	0	
33	Nasir Jamal	2014	2018	16	352	53	27.07	3	0	6	0	–	–	0	4	0	
34	Afsar Zazai †	2014	2017	17	264	60	17.60	2	0	–	–	–	–	–	20	2	
35	Fareed Ahmad	2014	2026	20	46	17	9.20	0	0	781	25	3/56	29.28	0	3	0	
36	Rashid Khan ‡	2015	2026	120	1,419	60*	18.67	5	0	6,008	214	7/18	19.92	6	36	0	
37	Yamin Ahmadzai	2015	2022	9	9	5	3.00	0	0	340	7	2/34	43.42	0	4	0	
38	Rokhan Barakzai	2015	2015	1	–	–	–	–	–	60	2	2/45	22.50	0	1	0	
39	Naveen-ul-Haq	2016	2023	15	37	10*	7.40	0	0	691	22	4/42	32.18	0	4	0	
40	Ihsanullah	2017	2018	16	307	57*	21.92	3	0	–	–	–	–	–	10	0	
41	Karim Janat	2017	2023	3	32	22	10.66	0	0	78	0	–	–	0	0	0	
42	Najeeb Tarakai	2017	2017	1	5	5	5.00	0	0	–	–	–	–	–	0	0	
43	Mujeeb Ur Rahman	2017	2023	75	236	64	9.07	1	0	3,968	101	5/50	28.34	1	11	0	
44	Hazratullah Zazai	2018	2019	16	361	67	22.56	9	0	–	–	–	–	–	3	0	
45	Ikram Alikhil †	2019	2025	32	386	86	21.44	3	0	–	–	–	–	–	23	5	
46	Sayed Shirzad	2019	2019	2	25	25	25.00	0	0	48	1	1/56	56.00	0	0	0	
47	Zahir Khan	2019	2019	1	–	–	–	–	–	60	2	2/55	27.50	0	0	0	
48	Ibrahim Zadran	2019	2026	42	1,902	177	48.76	9	6	–	–	–	–	–	16	0	
49	Azmatullah Omarzai	2021	2026	44	1,169	149*	43.29	9	1	1,371	44	5/58	28.47	1	8	0	
50	Rahmanullah Gurbaz †	2021	2026	55	2,036	151	37.70	7	9	0	0	–	–	–	28	4	
51	Shahidullah	2022	2023	3	39	37	13.00	0	0	18	0	–	–	–	2	0	
52	Fazalhaq Farooqi	2022	2025	42	21	6*	3.50	0	0	1,776	52	4/34	33.50	0	3	0	
53	Qais Ahmad	2022	2024	3	12	11	6.00	0	0	130	6	3/32	22.16	0	0	0	
54	Riaz Hassan	2022	2024	7	165	50	27.50	1	0	–	–	–	–	–	3	0	
55	Noor Ahmad	2022	2025	13	46	26	9.20	0	0	635	10	3/49	64.40	0	1	0	
56	Mohammad Saleem	2023	2026	4	10	9	10.00	0	0	133	1	1/75	181.00	0	2	0	
57	Abdul Rahman	2023	2023	3	10	4*	5.00	0	0	104	1	1/83	133.00	0	0	0	
58	Zia-ur-Rehman	2023	2023	1	5	5	5.00	0	0	21	0	–	–	0	0	0	
59	Allah Mohammad Ghazanfar	2024	2026	17	61	31*	7.62	0	0	655	24	6/26	20.75	0	1	0	
60	Nangeyalia Kharote	2024	2026	11	70	27*	11.66	0	0	464	17	4/26	18.52	0	2	0	
61	Naveed Zadran	2024	2024	4	10	9*	10.00	0	0	66	3	3/13	26.33	0	0	0	
62	Abdul Malik	2024	2024	4	122	84	40.66	1	0	–	–	–	–	–	0	0	
63	Sediqullah Atal	2024	2026	14	419	104	32.23	2	1	–	–	–	–	–	5	0	
64	Bilal Sami	2024	2026	3	2	2*	–	0	0	114	5	5/33	29.60	1	2	0	
65	Bashir Ahmad	2025	2025	2	0	0*	–	0	0	36	0	–	–	0	2	0	
66	Ziaur Rahman	2026	2026	2	5	4	5.00	0	0	48	1	1/39	60.00	0	0	0	
67	Darwish Rasooli	2026	2026	2	7	6*	7.00	0	0	–	–	–	–	–	1	0	

== See also ==
- List of Afghanistan Test cricketers
- List of Afghanistan T20I cricketers
- List of Afghanistan first-class cricketers
- List of Afghanistan Twenty20 International cricket records
