= Afghan cricket team in the Netherlands in 2009 =

Afghanistan cricket team in the Netherlands in 2009
	Afghanistan	Netherlands
- Dates: 24 August – 1 September 2009
Captains	Nowroz Mangal	Jeroen Smits

One Day International series
- Results: 2-match series drawn 1–1
Most runs	Mohammad Shehzad 126	Ryan ten Doeschate 156
Most wickets	Shapoor Zadran 5	Mudassar Bukhari 4

The Afghanistan national cricket team toured the Netherlands in 2009. The tour consisted of two One Day Internationals and an Intercontinental Cup match against the Netherlands national cricket team.

In the first-class match, Afghanistan won the Intercontinental Cup match by 1 wicket with Samiullah Shinwari scoring the winning runs. This victory also meant that this was the Afghanistan maiden international first-class win. The ODI series saw the matches end in a one all draw with the Netherlands taking the first match while Afghanistan won the second.

== Intercontinental Cup match ==
24–27 August
Scorecard

Netherlands	v	Afghanistan
181 (56.5 overs); Tom de Grooth 54 (86); Hamid Hassan 4/45 (17.5 overs)		107 (36.5 overs); Nowroz Mangal 41 (102); Peter Borren 3/21 (9 overs)
132 (38.1 overs); Peter Borren 63 (70); Mirwais Ashraf 4/24 (9.1 overs)		209/9 (89.3 overs); Noor Ali 56 (127); Edgar Schiferli 5/57 (24 overs)

Afghanistan won by 1 wicket
VRA Cricket Ground, Amstelveen
Umpires: Niels Bagh (Den) and Nadeem Ghauri (Pak)

- Points: Netherlands 6, Afghanistan 14

== ODI series ==
=== 1st ODI ===
30 August
Scorecard

Netherlands; 188 (47 overs)	v	Afghanistan; 180/8 (49.5 overs)
Ryan ten Doeschate 59 (89); Shapoor Zadran 4/24 (10 overs)		Noor Ali 34 (59); Ryan ten Doeschate 4/35 (9.5 overs)

Netherlands won by 8 runs
VRA Cricket Ground, Amstelveen
Umpires: Niels Bagh (Den) and Nadeem Ghauri (Pak)
Player of the match: Ryan ten Doeschate (Ned)

- Afghanistan won the toss and elected to field.

=== 2nd ODI ===
1 September
Scorecard

Netherlands; 231/7 (50 overs)	v	Afghanistan; 232/4 (46.4 overs)
Ryan ten Doeschate 98 (133); Nowroz Mangal 3/35 (6 overs)		Mohammad Shahzad 110 (112); Mudassar Bukhari 2/40 (8 overs)

Afghanistan won by 6 wickets
VRA Cricket Ground, Amstelveen
Umpires: Niels Bagh (Den) and Nadeem Ghauri (Pak)
Player of the match: Mohammad Shahzad (Afg)

- Netherlands won the toss and elected to bat.
