= Shafiqullah (cricketer) =

Afghan cricketer

Personal information
- Full name: Mohammad Shafiqullah
- Born: 7 August 1989 (age 37); Nangarhar Province, Afghanistan
- Batting: Right-handed
- Role: Wicketkeeper

International information
- National side: Afghanistan (2006–2019)
- ODI debut (cap 16): 1 September 2009 v Netherlands
- Last ODI: 27 August 2018 v Ireland
- ODI shirt no.: 28
- T20I debut (cap 10): 1 February 2010 v Ireland
- Last T20I: 21 September 2019 v Bangladesh
- T20I shirt no.: 28

Domestic team information
- Years: Team
- 2017–2018: Speen Ghar region
- 2017, 2019: Speen Ghar Tigers
- 2018: Kabul region
- 2018: Nangarhar Leopards
- 2019/20: Sylhet Thunder

Career statistics
Competition	ODI	T20I	LA	T20
Matches	24	46	55	79
Runs scored	430	494	1071	801
Batting average	22.63	16.46	23.80	14.83
100s/50s	0/2	0/1	0/7	0/2
Top score	56	51*	77	60
Catches/stumpings	11/3	14/2	30/4	29/3
Medal record
Representing Afghanistan
Men's Cricket
Asian Games
Silver medal – second place	2010 Guangzhou	Team
- Source: Cricinfo, 10 May 2020

Shafiqullah Shafaq (Pashto: شفیق الله شفق; or Mohammad Shafiqullah) (born 7 August 1989) is an Afghan cricketer, who played for the Afghanistan national cricket team before being banned from cricket for corruption in May 2020. He is a right-handed batsman who plays primarily as a wicketkeeper.

== International career ==
His debut for Afghanistan came against Saudi Arabia in the 2006 Asian Cricket Council Middle East Cup. His next appearance for the team was in 2008 when Afghanistan played Malaysia as part of the 2008 ACC Trophy Elite, during which he played 5 more matches for Afghanistan. Later, he continued to be a part of the rapidly rising Afghanistan cricket team that in under a year, from 2008 to 2009, won World Cricket League Division Five, Division Four and Division Three, thus reaching Division Two and becoming eligible to take part in the 2009 ICC World Cup Qualifier where they qualified for One Day International status and first-class status.

It was during the World Cup Qualifier that he made his List-A debut for Afghanistan against Denmark. He represented Afghanistan in 5 List-A matches during the tournament.

His One Day International debut came in 2009 when Afghanistan played the Netherlands during their 2009 tour of the Netherlands. His second ODI came against Canada in February 2010.

Later in November 2009, he represented Afghanistan in the 2009 ACC Twenty20 Cup, during which he played 5 matches against China, Singapore, Hong Kong, Saudi Arabia, the United Arab Emirates and Kuwait. He played in the final of that tournament, against the United Arab Emirates, which Afghanistan won by 8 wickets.

His Twenty20 International debut came against Ireland during the 2010 Quadrangular Twenty20 Series in Sri Lanka in February 2010. He was later selected as part of the Afghanistan squad for the 2010 ICC World Twenty20 Qualifier, where he played 3 Twenty20 Internationals against Ireland, Scotland and the Netherlands. Afghanistan won this tournament and therefore qualified for the 2010 ICC World Twenty20.

Shafiqullah was selected to represent Afghanistan at the 2010 Asian Games in which Afghanistan won silver.

Selected as part of Afghanistan's ICC World Twenty20, he did not feature in either of the team's matches against India and South Africa.

== Domestic career ==
He made his first-class debut for Speen Ghar Region in the 2017–18 Ahmad Shah Abdali 4-day Tournament on 13 November 2017. He also played for Speen Ghar in that year's Regional One Day Tournament and the Speen Ghar Tigers in the 2017 Shpageeza Cricket League.

In 2018, he switched to the Kabul Region team. In April 2018, during a match in the 2018 Ahmad Shah Abdali 4-day Tournament at Asadabad, he scored the fastest double century in first-class cricket. He scored 200 not out from 89 balls, and also scored the most sixes in a first-class match, with 24. To date, this is his only century in professional cricket. He was the leading run-scorer for Kabul Region in the 2018 Ghazi Amanullah Khan Regional One Day Tournament, with 197 runs in four matches. He also played for their first class team in the 2018 Ahmad Shah Abdali 4-day Tournament.

In September 2018, he was named in Nangarhar's squad in the first edition of the Afghanistan Premier League tournament. In October 2019, he played for the Speen Ghar Tigers in the 2019 Sphageeza Cricket League. In November 2019, he was selected to play for the Sylhet Thunder in the 2019–20 Bangladesh Premier League.

== Ban for corruption ==
In May 2020, Shafiqullah was banned from cricket for six years by the Afghanistan Cricket Board, on charges of corruption relating to the 2018–19 Afghanistan Premier League and the 2019–20 Bangladesh Premier League.
