= Rais Ahmadzai =

Afghan cricketer

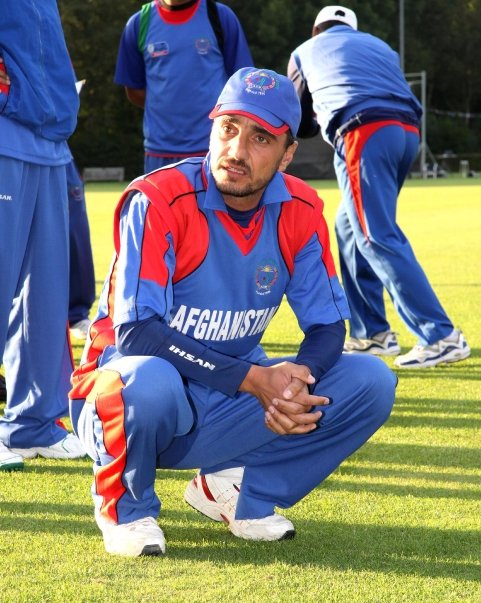

Personal information
- Full name: Rais Khan Ahmadzai
- Born: 3 September 1984 (age 42); Azra, Logar Province, Afghanistan
- Batting: Right-handed
- Bowling: Right-arm off break
- Relatives: Nasir Jamal (brother)

International information
- National side: Afghanistan (2009-2010)
- ODI debut (cap 10): 19 April 2009 v Scotland
- Last ODI: 18 February 2010 v Canada
- ODI shirt no.: 33
- T20I debut (cap 8): 1 February 2010 v Ireland
- Last T20I: 5 May 2010 v South Africa
- T20I shirt no.: 33

Domestic team information
- Years: Team
- 2007/08: Sebastianites Cricket and Athletic Club

Career statistics
Competition	ODI	T20I	FC	LA
Matches	5	8	3	16
Runs scored	88	91	90	283
Batting average	29.33	30.33	18.00	25.72
100s/50s	0/0	0/0	0/0	0/1
Top score	39	33*	27	50*
Balls bowled	24	–	36	150
Wickets	0	–	0	1
Bowling average	–	–	–	107.00
5 wickets in innings	–	–	–	0
10 wickets in match	–	–	–	0
Best bowling	–	–	–	1/37
Catches/stumpings	2/–	2/–	1/–	6/–
- Source: Cricinfo, 26 January 2025

Rais Ahmadzai (Pashto: رئیس احمدزی; born 3 September 1984) (Also known as Raees Ahmadzai) is an Afghan former cricketer who represented the Afghanistan national cricket team until his retirement in May 2010. Currently he is the national team's coach and U19 Head Coach. During his professional career, Ahmadzai was Captain of the Afghanistan National Team and was the first player to receive the Man of the Match award for Afghanistan. He was also adjudged as the Player of the Match four additional times. Ahmadzai is a right-handed batsman who bowls right-arm off break. He was honored with the Peace and Sports Award in Monaco. He is also the first ever Afghanistan UNICEF National Goodwill Ambassador.

== Early and personal life ==
Ahmadzai was born in the village of Azra, Logar Province, Afghanistan. He is from the Kuchi tribe, as are his former teammates Mohammad Nabi and Dawlat Ahmadzai.

Ahmadzai spent much of his early years as a refugee with his family, fleeing the Soviet invasion of Afghanistan and the subsequent Civil War that followed the Soviet withdrawal. Ahmadzai, like many of his teammates, learnt the game in neighbouring Pakistan, in Ahmadzai's case in a Peshawar schoolyard.

== Career ==
Ahmadzai made his debut for Afghanistan against Rahim Yar Khan in the 2002/3 Cornelius Trophy. He made his international debut for Afghanistan against Hong Kong in the 2004 ACC Trophy. Ahmadzai represented Afghanistan in the following tournament in 2006. During the 2006 tournament, Ahmadzai captained the side.

In 2007, Ahmadzai played two List-A matches for the Sebastianites Cricket and Athletic Club in Sri Lanka, playing matches against Lankan Cricket Club and the Sri Lanka Army Sports Club.

Ahmadzai was part of the rapidly rising Afghan team that from 2008 to 2009 won the World Cricket League Division Five, Division Four and Division Three, thus promoting them to Division Two and allowing them to partake in the 2009 ICC World Cup Qualifier.

During the qualifier, Ahmadzai made his List-A debut for Afghanistan against Denmark. During the same tournament Afghanistan gained ODI status, with Ahmadzai making his One Day International debut against Scotland, where he scored 39 runs, helping Afghanistan to an 89-run victory.

Ahmadzai made his first class debut in the Intercontinental Cup against a Zimbabwe XI in which Afghanistan drew the match. Later, in November 2009 he was a member of Afghanistan's 2009 ACC Twenty20 Cup winning squad.

Ahmadzai made his full Twenty20 International debut against Ireland in the 2010 Quadrangular Twenty20 Series in Sri Lanka. Later on in February 2010, Ahmadzai was a key member of Afghanistan's victorious 2010 ICC World Twenty20 Qualifier winning squad and was later named in Afghanistan's squad for the 2010 ICC World Twenty20.

In April 2010, Ahmadzai was a key member of Afghanistan's 2010 ACC Trophy Elite winning squad which defeated Nepal in the final, with Ahmadzai scoring 52 runs in Afghanistan's innings; earning him the man of the match award. Ahmadzai played in both of Afghanistan's matches in Group C of the 2010 ICC World Twenty20. In their first match of the tournament he remained unbeaten on 5 against India and against South Africa he was caught behind by Mark Boucher off the bowling of Morné Morkel. Afghanistan lost both matches and were eliminated from the tournament.

== Retirement ==
Shortly before Afghanistan's match against South Africa, Ahmadzai announced he would retire following the match. He stated his reason for retiring was "to focus on developing the younger generation of Afghan cricketers". Ahmadzai has now taken up a coaching role with the national squad as well a chief selector for the Afghanistan Cricket Board. He is also a representative of Afghanaid. On 8 August 2020 Afghanistan Cricket Board appointed Ahmadazai as Director of Cricket. As of 2026, he is now coach of the Afghanistan under-19 and Afghanistan A cricket teams.
