= Aftab Alam (Afghan cricketer) =

Afghan cricketer (born 1992)

Personal information
- Born: 30 November 1992 (age 33); Nangarhar, Afghanistan
- Batting: Right-handed
- Bowling: Right-arm fast
- Role: All-rounder

International information
- National side: Afghanistan
- ODI debut (cap 17): 16 February 2010 v Canada
- Last ODI: 22 June 2019 v India
- ODI shirt no.: 55
- T20I debut (cap 20): 24 March 2012 v Ireland
- Last T20I: 22 August 2018 v Ireland
- T20I shirt no.: 55

Domestic team information
- Years: Team
- 2017: Speen Ghar Tigers
- 2020: Dambulla Viiking
- 2025: Durbar Rajshahi

Career statistics
| Competition | ODI | T20I | FC | LA |
|---|---|---|---|---|
| Matches | 27 | 12 | 8 | 50 |
| Runs scored | 80 | 2 | 129 | 223 |
| Batting average | 11.42 | 1 | 10.75 | 12.38 |
| 100s/50s | 0/0 | 0/0 | 0/0 | 0/0 |
| Top score | 16* | 1* | 36 | 33 |
| Balls bowled | 1,257 | 245 | 1,143 | 2,383 |
| Wickets | 41 | 11 | 17 | 69 |
| Bowling average | 25.19 | 29.45 | 35.05 | 29.10 |
| 5 wickets in innings | 0 | 0 | 2 | 0 |
| 10 wickets in match | 0 | 0 | 0 | 0 |
| Best bowling | 4/25 | 2/23 | 6/38 | 4/25 |
| Catches/stumpings | 6/– | 3/– | 7/– | 13/– |
Medal record
Representing Afghanistan
Men's Cricket
Asian Games
| Silver medal – second place | 2010 Guangzhou | Team |
- Source: Cricinfo, 21 July 2022

Aftab Alam (Pashto: آفتاب عالم) (born 30 November 1992) is an Afghan international cricketer. He made his One Day International (ODI) debut for the Afghanistan national cricket team in early 2010. Alam has been known for his right-arm fast bowling. He made his first-class debut for Mis Ainak Region in the 2017–18 Ahmad Shah Abdali 4-day Tournament on 13 November 2017.

In July 2018, he was the leading wicket-taker for Speen Ghar Region in the 2018 Ghazi Amanullah Khan Regional One Day Tournament, with ten dismissals in four matches.

In September 2018, he was named in Balkh's squad in the first edition of the Afghanistan Premier League tournament.

In April 2019, Alam was named in Afghanistan's squad for the 2019 Cricket World Cup. However, he was ruled out of the tournament due to "exceptional circumstances" and was replaced by Sayed Shirzad. It later emerged that he was sent home following allegations of serious misbehavior with a female guest at the team hotel in Southampton. After the tournament, the Afghanistan Cricket Board (ACB) banned Alam for one year from all cricket, following a series of incidents that took place during the Cricket World Cup. His national contract was also suspended for the mentioned period. In June 2020, the ACB confirmed that his ban had ended and that he had joined the national team at a training camp.
