= Najibullah Zadran =

Afghan cricketer (born 1993)

Personal information
- Born: 28 February 1993 (age 33); Kabul, Afghanistan
- Batting: Left-handed
- Bowling: Right-arm off break
- Role: Middle-order batter

International information
- National side: Afghanistan (2012-2024)
- ODI debut (cap 27): 5 July 2012 v Ireland
- Last ODI: 11 October 2023 v India
- ODI shirt no.: 1
- T20I debut (cap 21): 19 September 2012 v India
- Last T20I: 20 June 2024 v India
- T20I shirt no.: 1

Domestic team information
- Years: Team
- 2017: Band-e-Amir Region
- 2017–2018/19: Chittagong Vikings
- 2018: Montreal Tigers
- 2018: Kandahar
- 2019–20: Khulna Tigers
- 2020: St Lucia Zouks (squad no. 10)
- 2021: Dambulla Giants
- 2021: Karachi Kings
- 2022: Barbados Royals
- 2022: Minister Dhaka
- 2022: Kandy Falcons
- 2023: Quetta Gladiators
- 2024: Chattogram Challengers
- 2025: Peshawar Zalmi

Career statistics
Competition	ODI	T20I	FC	LA
Matches	92	107	5	125
Runs scored	2,060	1,830	306	2,997
Batting average	29.01	29.51	30.60	30.27
100s/50s	1/15	0/8	0/3	1/23
Top score	104*	73	99	104*
Balls bowled	30	–	156	334
Wickets	0	–	2	4
Bowling average	–	–	42.50	69.50
5 wickets in innings	–	–	0	0
10 wickets in match	–	–	0	0
Best bowling	–	–	1/12	1/10
Catches/stumpings	40/–	44/–	5/–	56/–
- Source: Cricinfo, 17 May 2025

Najibullah Zadran (Pashto: نجیب الله ځدراڼ; born 28 February 1993) is an Afghan cricketer and the vice captain of the Afghanistan Twenty20 International (T20I) side. Zadran is a left-handed batsman who bowls right-arm off breaks. He made his international debut in July 2012.

== Career ==
=== T20 franchise career ===
On 3 June 2018, Zadran was selected to play for the Montreal Tigers in the players' draft for the inaugural edition of the Global T20 Canada tournament. In September 2018, he was named in Kandahar's squad in the first edition of the Afghanistan Premier League tournament. The following month, he was named in the squad for the Chittagong Vikings team, following the draft for the 2018–19 Bangladesh Premier League.

In June 2019, Zadran was selected to play for the Winnipeg Hawks franchise team in the 2019 Global T20 Canada tournament. In November 2019, he was selected to play for the Khulna Tigers in the 2019–20 Bangladesh Premier League. In August 2020, he was named in the St Lucia Zouks squad for the 2020 Caribbean Premier League, replaced Colin Ingram who missing out the competition due to visa limitations.

Zadran was signed by Karachi Kings to play in the rescheduled matches in the 2021 Pakistan Super League. In November 2021, he was selected to play for the Dambulla Giants following the players' draft for the 2021 Lanka Premier League.

=== International career ===
Zadran represented Afghanistan Under-19s in the 2011 Under-19 World Cup Qualifier in Ireland. Zadran made his Twenty20 debut for the Afghan Cheetahs in the Faysal Bank Twenty-20 Cup against Rawalpindi Rams. He made two further appearances in that competition against Faisalabad Wolves and Multan Tigers. He scored 58 runs in this three appearances, at an average of 29.00, with a high score of 51 not out. This score came against Rawalpindi Rams, in a match in which he also claimed his maiden wicket when he dismissed Sohail Tanvir.

In December 2018, Zadran was named the captain of Afghanistan's under-23 team for the 2018 ACC Emerging Teams Asia Cup. In March 2019, in the third ODI against Ireland, he scored his first ODI century.

Zadran was a member of Afghanistan's 15-man squad for the 2019 Cricket World Cup. In July 2021, Zadran was made vice-captain of the Afghanistan T20I team. In September 2021, he was named in Afghanistan's squad for the 2021 ICC Men's T20 World Cup.

In May 2024, he was named in Afghanistan's squad for the 2024 ICC Men's T20 World Cup tournament.
