= Shapoor Zadran =

Afghan cricketer (1987–2026)

Personal information
- Born: 8 July 1987; Logar Province, Afghanistan
- Died: 7 July 2026 (aged 38); New Delhi, India
- Height: 6 ft 2.5 in (1.89 m)
- Batting: Left-handed
- Bowling: Left-arm fast-medium

International information
- National side: Afghanistan (2004–2020)
- ODI debut (cap 16): 19 April 2009 v Scotland
- Last ODI: 10 March 2019 v Ireland
- ODI shirt no.: 20
- T20I debut (cap 11): 1 February 2010 v Ireland
- Last T20I: 8 March 2020 v Ireland
- T20I shirt no.: 20

Domestic team information
- Years: Team
- 2007: Badureliya Cricket Club
- 2013: Khulna Royal Bengals
- 2017: Boost Defenders

Career statistics
Competition	ODI	T20I	FC	LA
Matches	43	32	8	55
Runs scored	67	27	22	102
Batting average	6.70	3.85	2.75	6.00
100s/50s	0/0	0/0	0/0	0/0
Top score	17	13	7	17
Balls bowled	1,935	599	1,092	2,476
Wickets	43	31	16	57
Bowling average	35.88	24.54	40.37	34.92
5 wickets in innings	0	0	0	0
10 wickets in match	0	0	0	0
Best bowling	4/24	2/9	4/28	4/24
Catches/stumpings	5/–	4/–	2/–	5/–
Medal record
Representing Afghanistan
Men's Cricket
Asian Games
Silver medal – second place	2010 Guangzhou	Team
- Source: Cricinfo, 8 March 2020

Shapoor Zadran (Pashto: شاهپور ځدراڼ; 8 July 1987 – 7 July 2026) was an Afghan cricketer who played for the national cricket team. He was a left-arm fast-medium bowler.

== Early life ==
Zadran was born in Logar Province, Afghanistan on 8 July 1987. He was a refugee in Peshawar, Pakistan, where he started playing cricket along with Mohammad Nabi, Asghar Stanikzai, and Dawlat Zadran.

== Domestic career ==
Zadran made his debut for Afghanistan against Chitral in the 2003–04 Inter-District Senior Tournament. His international debut for the side came against Oman in the 2004 ACC Trophy. Zadran also represented Afghanistan in the 2006 ACC Trophy, playing a single match against Bahrain, in the final which Afghanistan lost by three wickets.

In 2007, he made his List-A debut for Badureliya Cricket Club against Chilaw Marians Cricket Club in Sri Lanka, playing a single match for the club in the 2007/8 Premier Limited Overs Tournament.

In 2007 he made his Twenty20 debut for Afghanistan in the 2007 ACC Twenty20 Cup against Qatar, playing three matches in the tournament, including in the final against Oman which ended in a tie.

He was part of the rapidly rising Afghan team that from 2008 to 2009 won the World Cricket League Division Five, Division Four and Division Three, thus promoting them to Division Two and allowing them to partake in the 2009 ICC World Cup Qualifier, where they gained ODI status.

In 2009, Zadran made his first-class debut for Afghanistan in the Intercontinental Cup against a Zimbabwe XI in which Afghanistan drew the match.

== International career ==
Zadran made his One Day International debut against the Netherlands during Afghanistan's tour of the Netherlands in 2009, where he took 4/24 from 10 overs. Despite this, Afghanistan lost the match by eight runs.

Later, in November 2009 he was a member of Afghanistan's 2009 ACC Twenty20 Cup winning squad. In 2010 made his full Twenty20 International debut against Ireland in the 2010 Quadrangular Twenty20 Series in Sri Lanka. Later on in February 2010, Zadran was a key member of Afghanistan's 2010 ICC World Twenty20 Qualifier winning squad and was later named in Afghanistan's squad for the 2010 ICC World Twenty20.

In April 2010, Zadran was a key member of Afghanistan's 2010 ACC Trophy Elite winning squad which defeated Nepal in the final, with Zadran taking a single wicket for the cost of just 11 runs from 7 overs.

He was part of Afghanistan squad in the T20 World Cup 2012 in Sri Lanka and looked impressive. In the T20 World Cup, he along with Gulbadin Naib set the record for the highest 9th wicket partnership in ICC World T20 history (44), which is still a record for Afghanistan.

In August 2019, he was named in Afghanistan's Test squad for their one-off match against Bangladesh, but he did not play. In September 2021, he was named in Afghanistan's squad for the 2021 ICC Men's T20 World Cup.

== Death ==
Zadran died on 7 July 2026 in a New Delhi hospital after a long illness with HLH, a severe immune system disorder, aged 38. His passing was met by tributes from the ACB, various Afghan and international cricketers, and the cricketing media.
