= Asghar Afghan =

Afghan cricketer (born 1987)

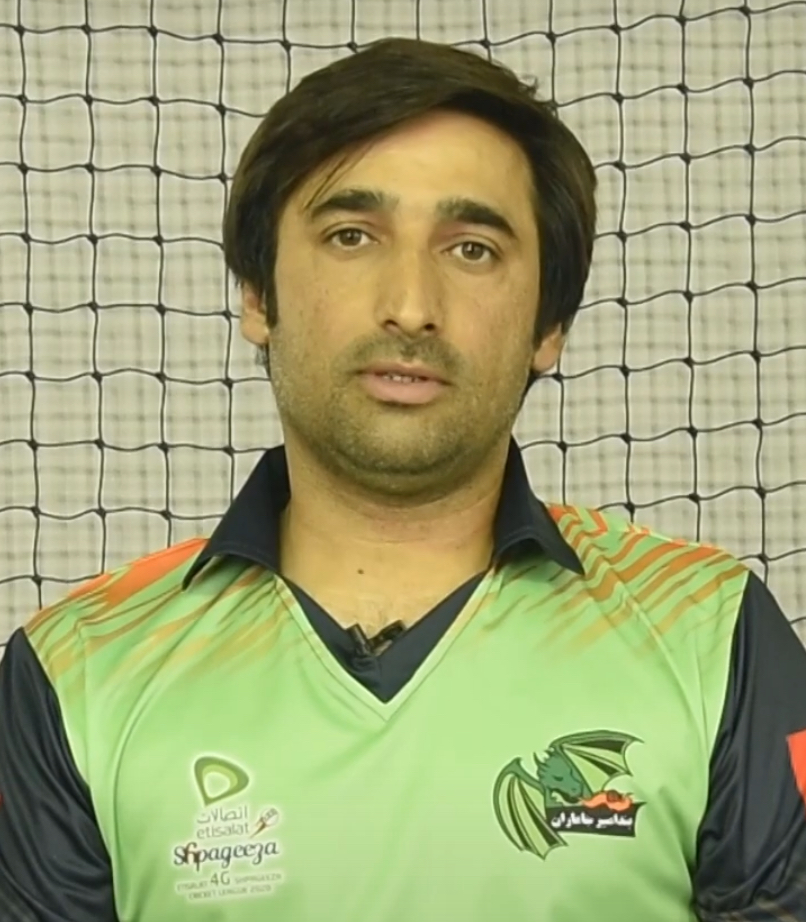
- Afghan in 2020

Personal information
- Full name: Mohammad Asghar Afghan
- Born: 26 December 1987 (age 38); Kabul, Afghanistan
- Batting: Right-handed
- Bowling: Right-arm medium-fast
- Role: Middle order batsman
- Relatives: Karim Janat (brother)

International information
- National side: Afghanistan (2004–2021)
- Test debut (cap 2): 14 June 2018 v India
- Last Test: 10 March 2021 v Zimbabwe
- ODI debut (cap 1): 19 April 2009 v Scotland
- Last ODI: 26 January 2021 v Ireland
- ODI shirt no.: 44
- T20I debut (cap 1): 1 February 2010 v Ireland
- Last T20I: 31 October 2021 v Namibia
- T20I shirt no.: 44

Domestic team information
- Years: Team
- 2017: Amo Region
- 2017: Kabul Eagles

Career statistics
| Competition | Test | ODI | T20I | FC |
|---|---|---|---|---|
| Matches | 6 | 114 | 75 | 29 |
| Runs scored | 440 | 2,424 | 1,382 | 1,861 |
| Batting average | 44.00 | 24.73 | 21.93 | 44.30 |
| 100s/50s | 1/3 | 1/12 | 0/4 | 6/6 |
| Top score | 164 | 101 | 62 | 164 |
| Balls bowled | 18 | 139 | 4 | 93 |
| Wickets | 0 | 3 | 1 | 0 |
| Bowling average | – | 30.33 | 4.00 | – |
| 5 wickets in innings | – | 0 | 0 | – |
| 10 wickets in match | – | 0 | 0 | – |
| Best bowling | – | 1/1 | 1/4 | – |
| Catches/stumpings | 2/– | 24/– | 20/– | 17/– |
Medal record
Representing Afghanistan
Men's Cricket
Asian Games
| Silver medal – second place | 2010 Guangzhou | Team |
- Source: Cricinfo, 21 July 2022

Mohammad Asghar Afghan (Pashto: محمد اصغر افغان; born Mohammad Asghar Stanikzai) is an Afghan former cricketer who had captained the Afghanistan national cricket team. Asghar is a right-handed batsman and a medium-fast bowler. In May 2018, he was named as the captain of Afghanistan, for their inaugural Test match, against India. He made his Test debut, against India, on 14 June 2018. On 2 August 2018, he changed his last name from Stanikzai to Afghan.

In April 2019, the Afghanistan Cricket Board (ACB) dropped him as captain of the Afghanistan team across all three formats. However, in December 2019, the ACB reappointed Asghar Stanikzai as the captain of the Afghanistan cricket team across all formats. In March 2021, during the series against Zimbabwe, Afghan played in his 50th T20I as Afghanistan's captain. In May 2021, he was sacked as the national team captain.

In October 2021, ahead of Afghanistan's match against Namibia in the 2021 ICC Men's T20 World Cup, Afghan announced his retirement from all forms of cricket following the game.

== Early life ==
Afghan was born in 1987 in Kabul, Afghanistan. He was a refugee in Peshawar, Pakistan, where he started playing cricket along with Mohammad Nabi, Dawlat Zadran, and Shapoor Zadran.

== Early career ==
Afghan made his representative international debut for Afghanistan U-17s in the 2004 ACC Under-17 competition, where he played his debut match against the United Arab Emirates Under-17s. His debut match for the senior squad came against Oman in the 2004 ACC Trophy, as well as the 2006 ACC Trophy and the 2007 ACC Twenty20 Cup.

Afghan was a member of the Afghanistan team that, from 2008 to 2009, won the World Cricket League Division Five, Division Four and Division Three, earning them promotion to Division Two and allowing them to take part in the 2009 ICC World Cup Qualifier where they gained One Day International status.

In the World Cup Qualifier, Afghan made his List-A debut, against Bermuda and later in the tournament he made his One Day International debut against Scotland. His first-class debut came in Intercontinental Cup against a Zimbabwe XI in a match that Afghanistan drew. Later, in November 2009 he was a member of Afghanistan's 2009 ACC Twenty20 Cup winning squad.

== Rising career ==
Afghan made his Twenty20 International debut against Ireland in the 2010 Quadrangular Twenty20 Series in Sri Lanka. Later on in February 2010, Afghan played a single match in Afghanistan's victorious 2010 ICC World Twenty20 Qualifier, playing in the final against Ireland. Afghan was later named in Afghanistan's squad for the 2010 ICC World Twenty20.

In April 2010, Afghan was a key member of Afghanistan's 2010 ACC Trophy Elite winning squad which defeated Nepal in the final. Afghan ended the tournament as the third leading run scorer with 253 runs, including a score of 151 runs from 83 balls against Bhutan.

On 1 March 2014, Afghan's 90* helped Afghanistan win against Bangladesh which was their first win against a Test-playing nation. He and Samiullah Shenwari put on a 164 runs partnership for the sixth wicket which is the fifth highest Partnership for the sixth wicket in the history of ODIs and the third highest ODI Partnership for Afghanistan.

In February 2018, he had his appendix removed, therefore missing the start of the 2018 Cricket World Cup Qualifier tournament.

In September 2018, he was named in Kandahar's squad in the first edition of the Afghanistan Premier League tournament. He was the leading run-scorer for the Kandahar Knights in the tournament, with 264 runs in eight matches.

In April 2019, he was named in Afghanistan's squad for the 2019 Cricket World Cup. The following month, in the ODI series against Scotland, he became the second cricketer for Afghanistan to play in 100 ODI matches. In September 2021, he was named in Afghanistan's squad for the 2021 ICC Men's T20 World Cup. Afghan announced his retirement from international cricket mid-way through the tournament, playing his final match against Namibia. He later explained that their loss against Pakistan made him decide that the time was right to retire as the team was too hurt and he wanted to give younger players a chance.
