= Dawlat Ahmadzai =

Afghan cricketer (born 1984)

Personal information
- Full name: Dawlat Khan Ahmadzi
- Born: 5 November 1984 (age 42); Peshawar, Afghanistan
- Batting: Right-handed
- Bowling: Right-arm fast-medium

International information
- National side: Afghanistan (2009-2010)
- ODI debut (cap 2): 19 April 2009 v Scotland
- Last ODI: 7 July 2010 v Netherlands
- ODI shirt no.: 77
- T20I debut (cap 2): 1 February 2010 v Ireland
- Last T20I: 1 May 2010 v India

Career statistics
Competition	ODI	T20I	FC	LA
Matches	3	2	2	10
Runs scored	–	2	13	34
Batting average	–	–	13.00	34.00
100s/50s	–	0/0	0/0	0/0
Top score	–	2*	7*	11*
Balls bowled	112	24	244	430
Wickets	1	2	9	4
Bowling average	121.00	23.00	15.33	93.00
5 wickets in innings	0	0	1	0
10 wickets in match	0	0	0	0
Best bowling	1/40	1/21	5/52	2/24
Catches/stumpings	0/–	0/–	0/–	2/–
- Source: Cricinfo, 25 January 2025

Dawlat Khan Ahmadzi (born 5 September 1984) is an Afghan former international cricketer. He is a right-handed batsman and right-arm fast-medium bowler who played limited overs cricket for the Afghanistan national cricket team.

After the Afghan team secured One Day International (ODI) status by managing a top-six finish at the 2009 ICC World Cup Qualifier in South Africa (although not qualifying for the 2011 Cricket World Cup itself), on April 19, 2009, Ahmadzai took the first ever wicket for Afghanistan in an ODI when he dismissed Scotland's Gavin Hamilton as the Afghan team won the Qualifier's fifth-place play-off at Willowmoore Park, Benoni.
