= Samiullah Shinwari =

Afghan cricketer

Personal information
- Full name: Samiullah Shinwari
- Born: 31 December 1987 (age 38); Nangarhar Province, Afghanistan
- Batting: Right-handed
- Bowling: Leg break
- Role: All-rounder

International information
- National side: Afghanistan (2009-2022)
- ODI debut (cap 11): 19 April 2009 v Scotland
- Last ODI: 4 July 2019 v West Indies
- ODI shirt no.: 45
- T20I debut (cap 9): 1 February 2010 v Ireland
- Last T20I: 3 September 2022 v Sri Lanka
- T20I shirt no.: 45

Domestic team information
- Years: Team
- 2011/12: Afghan Cheetahs
- 2013: Khulna Royal Bengals
- 2013/14: Mohammedan Sporting Club
- 2017: Boost Region
- 2017: Speen Ghar Tigers
- 2017: Rangpur Riders
- 2018: Paktia
- 2025: Sylhet Strikers

Career statistics
Competition	ODI	T20I	FC	LA
Matches	84	65	19	146
Runs scored	1,811	1,013	591	3,375
Batting average	29.20	22.02	25.68	30.40
100s/50s	0/11	0/2	1/2	3/18
Top score	96	61	102	192*
Balls bowled	2,111	634	2,233	4,078
Wickets	46	28	39	90
Bowling average	37.58	24.57	32.87	38.06
5 wickets in innings	0	1	0	0
10 wickets in match	0	0	0	0
Best bowling	4/31	5/13	4/75	4/24
Catches/stumpings	21/–	19/–	16/–	41/–
Medal record
Representing Afghanistan
Men's Cricket
Asian Games
Silver medal – second place	2010 Guangzhou	Team
Silver medal – second place	2014 Incheon	Team
- Source: ESPNcricinfo, 24 September 2022

Samiullah Shinwari (Pashto: سميع الله شينواري; born 31 December 1987) is an Afghan cricketer who represents Afghanistan at the international level. He is a right-handed batsman and leg break bowler. He made his international debut, against Scotland, in April 2009.

== Career ==
=== Domestic career ===
Shinwari played for the then newly formed Afghan Cheetahs team in the Faysal Bank Twenty-20 Cup 2011-12. In the final group stage match of the 2018 Ghazi Amanullah Khan Regional One Day Tournament, he scored 192 not out, batting for Speen Ghar Region against Amo Region. He finished the tournament as the leading run-scorer, with 398 runs in six matches.

In September 2018, Shinwari was named in Paktia's squad in the first edition of the Afghanistan Premier League tournament.

=== International career ===
Shinwari is part of the rapidly rising Afghan cricket team that in under a year has won the World Cricket League Division Five, Division Four and Division Three, thus promoting them to Division Two and allowing them to partake in the 2009 ICC World Cup Qualifier where they gained One Day International (ODI) status.

Shinwari was run out just one run short of his highest score in ODIs. He had scored 82 against Kenya in Amstelveen in 2010. This was his fourth fifty in ODIs and his first against a Test nation.

Asghar Stanikzai and Shinwari added 164 runs for the sixth wicket for Afghanistan which was the highest sixth-wicket partnership in the Asia Cup beating the 112 runs added by Alok Kapali and Mahmudullah against India at National Stadium, Karachi in 2008. The partnership was Afghanistan's highest for the sixth wicket in ODIs and their first century partnership for that wicket. The partnership was also Afghanistan's third-highest partnership for any wicket and only their sixth hundred partnerships in ODIs.

Shinwari was a member of Afghanistan's 15 man squad for the 2019 Cricket World Cup. In November 2019, he was named as the captain of Afghanistan's squad for the 2019 ACC Emerging Teams Asia Cup in Bangladesh.

On 6 March 2020, against Ireland in the first T20I, Shinwari completed 1,000 T20I runs, thus becoming only the 4th Afghan player to reach 1,000 T20I runs.
