= List of Afghanistan One Day International cricket records =

One Day International (ODI) cricket is played between international cricket teams who are Full Members of the International Cricket Council (ICC) as well as the top four Associate members. Unlike Test matches, ODIs consist of one inning per team, having a limit of 50 overs per innings – although in the past this has been 55 or 60 overs. ODI cricket is List-A cricket, so statistics and records set in ODI matches also count toward List-A records. The earliest match recognised as an ODI was played between England and Australia in January 1971; since when there have been over 4,000 ODIs played by 28 teams. This is a list of Afghanistan Cricket team's One Day International records. It is based on the List of One Day International cricket records, but concentrates solely on records dealing with the Afghanistan cricket team. Afghanistan played its first ever ODI in 2009 against Scotland.

== Key ==
The top five records are listed for each category, except for the team wins, losses, draws and ties, all round records and the partnership records. Tied records for fifth place are also included. Explanations of the general symbols and cricketing terms used in the list are given below. Specific details are provided in each category where appropriate. All records include matches played for Afghanistan only, and are correct as of July 2020.

Key
Symbol	Meaning
†	Player or umpire is currently active in ODI cricket
‡	Event took place during a Cricket World Cup
*	Player remained not out or partnership remained unbroken
♠	One Day International cricket record
Date	Starting date of the match
Innings	Number of innings played
Matches	Number of matches played
Opposition	The team Afghanistan was playing against
Period	The time period when the player was active in ODI cricket
Player	The player involved in the record
Venue	One Day International cricket ground where the match was played

== Team records ==
=== Overall Record ===
Matches	Won	Lost	Tied	NR	Win %
176	86	85	1	4	49.08
Last Updated: November 2024

=== Team wins, losses, draws and ties ===
As of 10 February 2025, Afghanistan has played 176 ODI matches resulting in 86 victories, 85 defeats, 1 tie and 4 no results for an overall winning percentage of 49.08

Opponent	Matches	Won	Lost	Tied	No Result	% Won	First	Last
Full Members
Australia	5	0	4	0	1	0.00	2012	2025
Bangladesh	20	10	10	0	0	50.00	2014	2025
England	4	2	2	0	0	50.00	2015	2025
India	4	0	3	1	0	0.00	2014	2023
Ireland	32	18	13	0	0	53.33	2010	2021
New Zealand	3	0	3	0	0	0.00	2015	2023
Pakistan	8	1	7	0	0	12.5	2012	2023
South Africa	6	2	4	0	0	33.33	2019	2025
Sri Lanka	15	4	10	0	1	28.57	2014	2024
West Indies	9	3	5	0	1	37.50	2017	2019
Zimbabwe	28	18	10	0	0	64.28	2014	2022
Associate Members
Canada	5	4	1	0	0	80.00	2010	2011
Hong Kong	2	1	1	0	0	50.00	2014	2018
Kenya	6	4	2	0	0	66.66	2010	2013
Netherlands	10	8	2	0	0	80.00	2009	2023
Scotland	13	8	4	0	1	66.66	2009	2019
United Arab Emirates	6	3	3	0	0	50.00	2014	2018
Total	176	86	85	1	4	49.08	2009	2025
Statistics are correct as of September 2024.

=== First bilateral ODI series wins ===
Opponent	Year of first Home win	Year of first Away win
Australia	-	YTP
Bangladesh	2024	2023
Canada	YTP	-
Ireland	2017	2018
Kenya	YTP	-
Netherlands	YTP	-
Pakistan	-	-
Scotland	-	2016
South Africa	2024	YTP
United Arab Emirates	YTP	-
West Indies	-	-
Zimbabwe	2016	2015
Last updated: 8 July 2023

=== First ODI match wins ===
Opponent	Home		Away / Neutral	
Opponent	Venue	Year	Venue	Year
Australia	-		-	
Bangladesh	Abu Dhabi	2018	Fatullah	2014
Canada	Sharjah	2010	Voorburg	2010
England	YTP		New Delhi	2023
Hong Kong	YTP		Kuala Lumpur	2014
India	-		-	
Ireland	Greater Noida	2017	Dubai (DSC)	2015
Kenya	Nairobi	2011	Amstelveen	2010
Netherlands	Sharjah	2012	Amstelveen	2009
New Zealand	YTP		-	
Pakistan	-		Chennai	2023
Scotland	Sharjah	2013	Benoni	2009
South Africa	Sharjah	2024	-	
Sri Lanka	Abu Dhabi	2018	Pallekele	2022
United Arab Emirates	YTP		Kuala Lumpur	2014
West Indies	YTP		Gros Islet	2017
Zimbabwe	Sharjah	2016	Bulawayo	2014
Last updated: 14 February 2024

=== Winning every match in a series ===
In a bilateral series winning all matches is referred to as whitewash. First such event occurred when West Indies toured England in 1976. Afghanistan has not won any such ODI series till now.

=== Losing every match in a series ===
Afghanistan have suffered such whitewash three times.

Opposition	Matches	Host	Season
West Indies	3	India	2019/20
Pakistan	3	Sri Lanka	2023
Sri Lanka	3	Sri Lanka	2023/24
Last updated: 14 February 2024

=== Team scoring records ===
==== Most runs in an innings ====
The first ODI of the 2024 series against Sri Lanka saw Afghanistan set their highest innings total of 339/6.

Rank	Score	Opposition	Venue	Date	Scorecard
1	339/6	Sri Lanka	Pallekele International Cricket Stadium, Kandy	9 February 2024	Scorecard
2	338	Ireland	Greater Noida Sports Complex Ground, Greater Noida, India	17 March 2017	Scorecard
3	333/5	Zimbabwe	Sharjah Cricket Stadium, Sharjah, United Arab Emirates	8 February 2018	Scorecard
4	331/9	Bangladesh	Zohur Ahmed Chowdhury Stadium, Chittagong, Bangladesh	8 July 2023	Scorecard
5	325/7	England	Gaddafi Stadium, Lahore, Pakistan	26 February 2025	Scorecard
Last updated: 26 February 2025

==== Fewest runs in an innings ====
The lowest score in ODI history for Afghanistan is 58 scored in their third ODI of the 2016 series against Zimbabwe, which is joint 14th lowest of all time.

Rank	Score	Opposition	Venue	Date	Scorecard
1	58	Zimbabwe	Sharjah Cricket Stadium, Sharjah, United Arab Emirates	2 January 2016	Scorecard
2	59	Pakistan	Mahinda Rajapaksa International Cricket Stadium, Hambantota, Sri Lanka	22 August 2023	Scorecard
3	63	Scotland	Sheikh Zayed Cricket Stadium, Abu Dhabi, United Arab Emirates	14 January 2015	Scorecard
4	88	Kenya	Gymkhana Club Ground, Nairobi, Kenya	7 October 2010	Scorecard
5	104	Ireland	Clontarf Cricket Club Ground, Dublin, Ireland	5 July 2012	Scorecard

==== Most runs conceded in an innings ====
Afghanistan's World Cup game against the Australia saw them concede their highest innings total of 417/6.

Rank	Score	Opposition	Venue	Date	Scorecard
1	417/6	Australia	WACA, Perth, Australia	4 March 2015	Scorecard
2	397/6	England	Old Trafford, Manchester, England	18 June 2019 ‡	Scorecard
3	381/3	Sri Lanka	Pallekele International Cricket Stadium, Kandy	9 February 2024	Scorecard
4	334/5	Bangladesh	Gaddafi Stadium, Lahore, Pakistan	3 September 2023	Scorecard
5	333/5	Zimbabwe	Sharjah Cricket Stadium, Sharjah, United Arab Emirates	11 February 2018	Scorecard
Last updated: 9 February 2024

==== Fewest runs conceded in an innings ====
The lowest score conceded by Afghanistan for a full inning is 54 scored by Zimbabwe in the fifth ODI of the 2017 series.

Rank	Score	Opposition	Venue	Date	Scorecard
1	54	Zimbabwe	Harare Sports Club, Harare, Zimbabwe	26 February 2017	Scorecard
2	82	Zimbabwe	Sharjah Cricket Stadium, Sharjah, United Arab Emirates	25 December 2015	Scorecard
3	89	Kenya	Sharjah Cricket Stadium, Sharjah, United Arab Emirates	2 October 2013	Scorecard
4	93	Kenya	Sharjah Cricket Stadium, Sharjah, United Arab Emirates	4 October 2013	Scorecard
5	95	Zimbabwe	Sharjah Cricket Stadium, Sharjah, United Arab Emirates	19 February 2018	Scorecard
Last updated: 1 July 2020

==== Most runs aggregate in a match ====
The highest match aggregate scored in ODIs came in the match between South Africa and Australia in the fifth ODI of March 2006 series at Wanderers Stadium, Johannesburg when South Africa scored 438/9 in response to Australia's 434/4. Afghanistan's 2019 Cricket World Cup game against England in Old Trafford, Manchester saw a total of 644 runs being scored.

Rank	Aggregate	Scores	Venue	Date	Scorecard
1	720/9	Sri Lanka (381/3) v Afghanistan (339/6)	Pallekele International Cricket Stadium, Kandy	9 February 2024	Scorecard
2	644/14	England (397/6) v Afghanistan (247/8)	Old Trafford, Manchester, England	18 June 2019 ‡	Scorecard
3	642/20	Afghanistan (338) v Ireland (304)	Greater Noida Sports Complex Ground, Greater Noida, India	17 March 2017	
4	642/17	Afghanistan (325/7) v England (317)	Gaddafi Stadium , Lahore, Pakistan	26 February 2025	Scorecard
5	627/14	Afghanistan (313/8) v Sri Lanka (314/6)	Pallekele Cricket Stadium, Kandy, Sri Lanka	30 November 2022	Scorecard
Last updated: 9 February 2024

==== Fewest runs aggregate in a match ====
The lowest match aggregate in ODI history for Afghanistan is 184 scored in the 55th match of the 2011–13 ICC World Cricket League Championship against Kenya.

Rank	Aggregate	Scores	Venue	Date	Scorecard
1	184/12	Kenya (89) v Afghanistan (95/2)	Sharjah Cricket Stadium, Sharjah, United Arab Emirates	2 October 2013	Scorecard
2	189/17	Kenya (93) v Afghanistan (96/3)	Sharjah Cricket Stadium, Sharjah, United Arab Emirates	4 October 2013	Scorecard
3	212/8	Afghanistan (111/7) v England (101/1)	Sydney Cricket Ground, Sydney, Australia	13 March 2015 ‡	Scorecard
4	213/20	Afghanistan (131) v Zimbabwe (82)	Sharjah Cricket Stadium, Sharjah, United Arab Emirates	5 December 2015	Scorecard
5	218/13	Afghanistan (111) v Zimbabwe (107/3)	Harare Sports Club, Harare, Zimbabwe	24 February 2017	Scorecard
Last updated: 1 July 2020

=== Result records ===
An ODI match is won when one side has scored more runs than the total runs scored by the opposing side during their innings. If both sides have completed both their allocated innings and the side that fielded last has the higher aggregate of runs, it is known as a win by runs. This indicates the number of runs that they had scored more than the opposing side. If the side batting last wins the match, it is known as a win by wickets, indicating the number of wickets that were still to fall.

==== Greatest win margins (by runs) ====
The greatest winning margin by runs in ODIs was England's victory over South Africa by 342 runs in the third and final ODI of South Africa's 2025 tour of England. The largest victory recorded by Afghanistan is during the 2018 series by 154 runs against Zimbabwe.

Rank	Margin	Target	Opposition	Venue	Date
1	177 runs	312	South Africa	Sharjah Cricket Stadium, Sharjah, United Arab Emirates	20 September 2024
2	154 runs	334	Zimbabwe	Sharjah Cricket Stadium, Sharjah, United Arab Emirates	9 February 2018
3	146 runs	242	Zimbabwe	Sharjah Cricket Stadium, Sharjah, United Arab Emirates	19 February 2018
4	142 runs	332	Bangladesh	Zohur Ahmed Chowdhury Stadium, Chittagong, Bangladesh	8 July 2023
5	138 runs	239	Ireland	Sharjah Cricket Stadium, Sharjah, United Arab Emirates	7 December 2017
6	136 runs	256	Bangladesh	Sheikh Zayed Cricket Stadium, Abu Dhabi, United Arab Emirates	20 September 2018
Last updated: 8 July 2023

==== Greatest win margins (by balls remaining) ====
The greatest winning margin by balls remaining in ODIs was England's victory over Canada by 8 wickets with 277 balls remaining in the 1979 Cricket World Cup. The largest victory recorded by Afghanistan, is during the 2013 Series against Kenya when they won by 8 wickets with 193 balls remaining.

Rank	Balls remaining	Margin	Opposition	Venue	Date
1	193	8 wickets	Kenya	Sharjah Cricket Stadium, Sharjah, United Arab Emirates	2 October 2013
2	175	7 wickets	Kenya	Sharjah Cricket Stadium, Sharjah, United Arab Emirates	4 October 2013
3	173	10 wickets	Zimbabwe	Sharjah Cricket Stadium, Sharjah, United Arab Emirates	16 February 2018
4	157	8 wickets	Ireland	Stormont, Belfast, Northern Ireland	31 August 2018
5	138	6 wickets	Kenya	Gymkhana Club Ground, Nairobi, Kenya	9 October 2010
Last updated: 1 July 2020

==== Greatest win margins (by wickets) ====
A total of 55 matches have ended with chasing team winning by 10 wickets with West Indies winning by such margins a record 10 times. Afghanistan have won an ODI match by a margin of 10 wickets only once.

Rank	Margin	Opposition	Venue	Date
1	10 wickets	Zimbabwe	Sharjah Cricket Stadium, Sharjah, United Arab Emirates	16 February 2018
2	9 wickets	Scotland	Cambusdoon New Ground, Ayr, Scotland	16 August 2010
3	8 wickets	Kenya	Sharjah Cricket Stadium, Sharjah, United Arab Emirates	2 October 2013
3	8 wickets	Scotland	ICC Global Cricket Academy, Dubai, United Arab Emirates	15 January 2015
3	8 wickets	Ireland	Stormont, Belfast, Northern Ireland	31 August 2018
3	8 wickets	Pakistan	M.A. Chidambaram Stadium, Chennai, India	23 October 2023
Last updated: 3 December 2017

==== Highest successful run chases ====
South Africa holds the record for the highest successful run chase which they achieved when they scored 438/9 in response to Australia's 434/9. Afghanistan's highest innings total while chasing is 286/2 in a successful run chase against Pakistan at Chennai in 2023 Cricket World Cup.

Rank	Score	Target	Opposition	Venue	Date
1	286/2	286	Pakistan	M.A. Chidambaram Stadium, Chennai, India	23 October 2023
2	276/8	274	United Arab Emirates	ICC Global Cricket Academy, Dubai, United Arab Emirates	2 December 2014
3	269/4	269	Sri Lanka	Hambantota Cricket Stadium, Hambantota, Sri Lanka	2 June 2023
4	269/3	268	Scotland	Grange CC Ground, Edinburgh, Scotland	19 May 2019
5	264/8	262	Zimbabwe	Queens Sports Club, Bulawayo, Zimbabwe	22 July 2014
6	261/5	260	Scotland	Sharjah Cricket Stadium, Sharjah, United Arab Emirates	3 March 2013
6	261/3	260	Ireland	Sheikh Zayed Cricket Stadium, Abu Dhabi, UAE	24 January 2021
Last updated: 8 June 2023

==== Narrowest win margins (by runs) ====
The narrowest run margin victory is by 1 run which has been achieved in 31 ODI's with Australia winning such games a record 6 times. Afghanistan's has achieved victory by 1 run once.

Rank	Margin	Opposition	Venue	Date
1	1 run	Canada	Sharjah Cricket Stadium, Sharjah, United Arab Emirates	16 February 2010
2	2 runs	Scotland	Grange CC Ground, Edinburgh, Scotland	10 May 2019
3	8 runs	England	Gaddafi Stadium, Lahore, Pakistan	26 February 2025
4	12 runs	Zimbabwe	Harare Sports Club, Harare, Zimbabwe	16 February 2017
5	16 runs	Ireland	Sheikh Zayed Cricket Stadium, Abu Dhabi, UAE	21 January 2021
Last updated: 26 February 2025

==== Narrowest win margins (by balls remaining) ====
The narrowest winning margin by balls remaining in ODIs is by winning of the last ball which has been achieved 36 times with both South Africa winning seven times. Afghanistan has achieved victory by this margin only once when they defeated Kenya during the 2010 ICC World Cricket League Division One in Amstelveen in July 2010.

Rank	Balls remaining	Margin	Opposition	Venue	Date
1	0	1 wicket	Kenya	VRA Cricket Ground, Amstelveen, Netherlands	5 July 2010
2	2	2 wickets	Zimbabwe	Queens Sports Club, Bulawayo, Zimbabwe	22 July 2014
2	2	2 wickets	United Arab Emirates	ICC Global Cricket Academy, Dubai, United Arab Emirates	2 December 2014
2	2	2 wickets	Zimbabwe	Sharjah Cricket Stadium, Sharjah, United Arab Emirates	6 January 2016
2	2	2 wickets	Bangladesh	Shere-e-Bangla Stadium, Mirpur, Bangladesh	28 September 2016
Last updated: 1 July 2020

==== Narrowest win margins (by wickets) ====
The narrowest margin of victory by wickets is 1 wicket which has settled 55 such ODIs. Both West Indies and New Zealand have recorded such victory on eight occasions. Afghanistan has won the match by a margin of one wicket on three occasions.

Rank	Margin	Opposition	Venue	Date
1	1 wicket	Kenya	VRA Cricket Ground, Amstelveen, Netherlands	5 July 2010
1	1 wicket	Scotland	University Oval, Dunedin, New Zealand	26 February 2015 ‡
2	2 wickets	Canada	Maple Leaf North-West Ground, King City, Canada	7 August 2011
2	2 wickets	Zimbabwe	Queens Sports Club, Bulawayo, Zimbabwe	22 July 2014
2	2 wickets	United Arab Emirates	ICC Global Cricket Academy, Dubai, United Arab Emirates	2 December 2014
2	2 wickets	Zimbabwe	Sharjah Cricket Stadium, Sharjah, United Arab Emirates	6 January 2016
2	2 wickets	Bangladesh	Shere-e-Bangla Stadium, Mirpur, Bangladesh	28 September 2016
Last updated: 27 August 2023

==== Greatest loss margins (by runs) ====
Afghanistan's biggest defeat by runs was against Australia in the 2015 Cricket World Cup game at the WACA, Perth.

Rank	Margin	Opposition	Venue	Date
1	275 runs	Australia	WACA, Perth, Australia	4 March 2015 ‡
2	155 runs	Sri Lanka	Pallekele International Cricket Stadium, Kandy	11 February 2024
3	154 runs	Zimbabwe	Sharjah Cricket Stadium, Sharjah, United Arab Emirates	11 February 2018
4	150 runs	Scotland	Sheikh Zayed Cricket Stadium, Abu Dhabi, United Arab Emirates	14 January 2015
4	150 runs	England	Old Trafford, Manchester, England	18 June 2019 ‡
Last updated: 11 February 2024

==== Greatest loss margins (by balls remaining) ====
The greatest winning margin by balls remaining in ODIs was England's victory over Canada by 8 wickets with 277 balls remaining in the 1979 Cricket World Cup. The largest defeat suffered by Afghanistan was against Zimbabwe in Zimbabwe when they lost by 8 wickets with 160 balls remaining.

Rank	Balls remaining	Margin	Opposition	Venue	Date
1	204	9 wickets	Sri Lanka	Hambantota Cricket Stadium, Hambantota, Sri Lanka	7 June 2023
2	160	8 wickets	Zimbabwe	Queens Sports Club, Bulawayo, Zimbabwe	16 October 2015
3	142	9 wickets	Netherlands	Sharjah Cricket Stadium, Sharjah, United Arab Emirates	29 March 2012
4	118	7 wickets	Zimbabwe	Harare Sports Club, Harare, Zimbabwe	24 February 2017
5	159	7 wickets	Bangladesh	Zohur Ahmed Chowdhury Stadium, Chittagong, Bangladesh	11 July 2023
Last updated: 11 June 2023

==== Greatest loss margins (by wickets) ====
Afghanistan have never lost an ODI match by a margin of 10 wickets.

Rank	Margin	Opposition	Most recent venue	Date
1	9 wickets	Netherlands	Sharjah Cricket Stadium, Sharjah, United Arab Emirates	29 March 2012
1	9 wickets	England	Sydney Cricket Ground, Sydney, Australia	13 March 2015 ‡
1	9 wickets	South Africa	SWALEC Stadium, Cardiff, England	15 June 2019 ‡
1	9 wickets	Sri Lanka	Hambantota Cricket Stadium, Hambantota, Sri Lanka	7 June 2023
4	8 wickets	Kenya	Gymkhana Club Ground, Nairobi, Kenya	11 October 2010
4	8 wickets	India	Shere-e-Bangla Stadium, Mirpur, Bangladesh	5 March 2014
4	8 wickets	Zimbabwe	Queens Sports Club, Bulawayo, Zimbabwe	20 July 2014
4	8 wickets	Zimbabwe	Queens Sports Club, Bulawayo, Zimbabwe	16 October 2015
Last updated: 8 June 2023

==== Narrowest loss margins (by runs) ====
The narrowest loss of Afghanistan in terms of runs is by 2 run against Zimbabwe in March 2018.

Rank	Margin	Opposition	Venue	Date
1	2 runs	Zimbabwe	Queens Sports Club, Bulawayo, Zimbabwe	6 March 2018
2	3 runs	Zimbabwe	Harare Sports Club, Harare, Zimbabwe	21 February 2017
2	3 runs	Bangladesh	Sheikh Zayed Cricket Stadium, Abu Dhabi, United Arab Emirates	23 September 2018
4	7 runs	Bangladesh	Shere-e-Bangla Stadium, Mirpur, Bangladesh	25 September 2016
5	8 runs	Netherlands	VRA Cricket Ground, Amstelveen, Netherlands	30 August 2009
Last updated: 1 July 2020

==== Narrowest loss margins (by balls remaining) ====
The narrowest winning margin by balls remaining in ODIs is by winning of the last ball which has been achieved 36 times with both South Africa winning seven times. Afghanistan has not suffered any such loss by this margin.

Rank	Balls remaining	Margin	Opposition	Venue	Date
1	2	6 wickets	Zimbabwe	Queens Sports Club, Bulawayo, Zimbabwe	20 October 2015
1	2	3 wickets	Pakistan	Headingley, Leeds, England	29 June 2019 ‡
2	3	3 wickets	Pakistan	Sheikh Zayed Cricket Stadium, Abu Dhabi, United Arab Emirates	21 September 2018
2	3	4 wickets	Sri Lanka	Pallekele Cricket Stadium, Kandy, Sri Lanka	30 November 2022
3	6	4 wickets	Ireland	Rajiv Gandhi International Cricket Stadium, Dehradun, India	5 March 2019
4	8	5 wickets	United Arab Emirates	ICC Global Cricket Academy, Dubai, United Arab Emirates	28 November 2014
4	8	5 wickets	West Indies	Bharat Ratna Shri Atal Bihari Vajpayee Ekana Cricket Stadium, Lucknow, India	11 November 2019
Last updated: 8 June 2023

==== Narrowest loss margins (by wickets) ====
Narrowest defeat suffered by Afghanistan is by 1 wicket against Pakistan in August 2023 during the Pakistani cricket team against Afghanistan in Sri Lanka in 2023.

Rank	Margin	Opposition	Venue	Date
1	1 wicket	Pakistan	Mahinda Rajapaksa International Cricket Stadium, Hambantota, Sri Lanka	24 August 2023
2	2 wickets	Scotland	Hazelaarweg Stadion, Rotterdam, Netherlands	9 July 2010
3	3 wickets	Ireland	Dubai International Cricket Stadium, Dubai, United Arab Emirates	10 January 2015
3	3 wickets	Ireland	Greater Noida Sports Complex Ground, Greater Noida, India	22 March 2017
3	3 wickets	Ireland	Stormont, Belfast, Northern Ireland	29 August 2018
3	3 wickets	Pakistan	Sheikh Zayed Cricket Stadium, Abu Dhabi, United Arab Emirates	21 September 2018
3	3 wickets	Pakistan	Headingley, Leeds, England	29 June 2019 ‡
Last updated: 1 July 2020

==== Tied matches ====
A tie can occur when the scores of both teams are equal at the conclusion of play, provided that the side batting last has completed their innings. There have been 37 ties in ODIs history with Afghanistan involved in only one such games.

Opposition	Venue	Date
India	Dubai International Cricket Stadium, Dubai, United Arab Emirates	25 September 2018
Last updated: 3 December 2017

== Individual records ==
=== Batting records ===
==== Most career runs ====
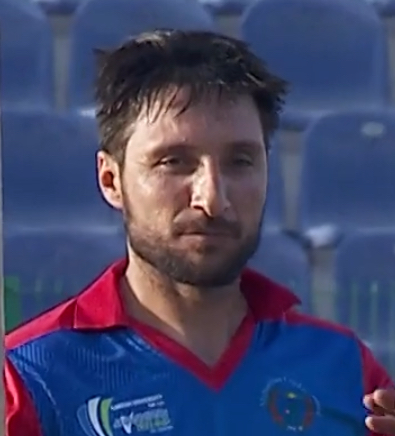
Rahmat Shah is the highest run scorer for Afghanistan

A run is the basic means of scoring in cricket. A run is scored when the batsman hits the ball with his bat and with his partner runs the length of 22 yards (20 m) of the pitch. Afghanistan's Rahmat Shah is the leading scorer for Afghanistan.

Rank	Runs	Player	Matches	Innings	Average	100	50	Period
1	3,963	Rahmat Shah†	122	117	35.38	5	31	2013–2025
2	3,666	Mohammad Nabi†	172	150	27.35	2	17	2009–2025
3	2,727	Mohammad Shahzad	84	84	33.66	6	14	2009–2019
4	2,424	Asghar Afghan	114	108	24.73	1	12	2009–2021
5	2,415	Hashmatullah Shahidi†	89	87	33.54	0	22	2013–2025
Last updated: 27 February 2025

==== Fastest runs getter ====
Runs	Batsman	Match	Innings	Record Date	Reference
1000	Ibrahim Zadran	24	24	23 October 2023	
2000	Rahmat Shah	61	57	21 May 2019	
3000	Rahmat Shah	86	82	25 November 2022	

==== Most runs in each batting position ====
Batting position	Batsman	Innings	Runs	Average	ODI Career Span	Ref
Opener	Mohammad Shahzad	62	2,049	34.15	2009–2019	
Number 3	Rahmat Shah†	101	3,373	34.77	2014–2024	
Number 4	Hashmatullah Shahidi†	62	1,904	36.61	2014–2024	
Number 5	Asghar Afghan	48	1,038	23.06	2009–2021	
Number 6	Mohammad Nabi†	60	1,224	22.66	2009–2024	
Number 7	Mohammad Nabi†	40	1,005	29.55	2009–2025	
Number 8	Rashid Khan†	46	676	17.38	2015–2024	
Number 9	Rashid Khan†	29	531	21.34	2016–2025	
Number 10	Dawlat Zadran	25	252	28.00	2012–2019	
Number 11	Mujeeb ur Rahman†	15	51	7.28	2017–2019	
Last updated: 27 February 2025.

==== Most runs against each team ====
Opposition	Runs	Player	Matches	Innings	Span	Ref
Australia	151	Ibrahim Zadran†	2	2	2023–2025	
Bangladesh	449	Rahmanullah Gurbaz†	11	11	2022–2024	
Canada	190	Mohammad Nabi†	5	5	2010–2011	
England	205	Ibrahim Zadran†	2	2	2023–2025	
Hong Kong	70	Usman Ghani†	1	1	2014–2014	
India	146	Mohammad Shahzad	2	2	2014–2018	
Ireland	891	Rahmat Shah†	28	28	2016–2024	
Kenya	176	Mohammad Nabi†	6	5	2010–2013	
Netherlands	312	Mohammad Shahzad	6	6	2009–2012	
New Zealand	67	Hashmatullah Shahidi†	2	2	2019–2023	
Pakistan	239	Rahmanullah Gurbaz†	4	4	2023–2023	
Scotland	407	Mohammad Shahzad	9	9	2010–2019	
South Africa	229	Rahmanullah Gurbaz†	5	5	2023–2025	
Sri Lanka	569	Ibrahim Zadran†	11	11	2022–2024	
United Arab Emirates	239	Nawroz Mangal	4	4	2014–2014	
West Indies	303	Rahmat Shah†	9	8	2017–2019	
Zimbabwe	751	Mohammad Nabi†	31	26	2014–2024	
Last updated: 27 February 2025

==== Highest individual score ====
Ibrahim Zadran holds Afghanistan's record for the highest individual score.

Rank	Runs	Player	Opposition	Venue	Date
1	177	Ibrahim Zadran	England	Gaddafi Stadium, Lahore, Pakistan	26 February 2025
2	162	Ibrahim Zadran	Sri Lanka	Pallekele International Cricket Stadium, Pallekele, Sri Lanka	30 November 2022
3	151	Rahmanullah Gurbaz	Pakistan	Mahinda Rajapaksa International Cricket Stadium, Hambantota, Sri Lanka	24 August 2023
4	149*	Azmatullah Omarzai	Sri Lanka	Pallekele International Cricket Stadium, Pallekele, Sri Lanka	9 February 2024
5	145	Rahmanullah Gurbaz	Bangladesh	Zohur Ahmed Chowdhury Stadium, Chittagong, Bangladesh	8 July 2023
Last updated: 27 February 2025

==== Highest individual score – progression of record ====
Runs	Player	Opponent	Venue	Date
58	Mohammad Nabi	Scotland	Willowmoore Park, Benoni, South Africa	19 April 2009
110	Mohammad Shahzad	Netherlands	VRA Cricket Ground, Amstelveen, Netherlands	1 September 2009
118	Mohammad Shahzad	Canada	Sharjah Cricket Stadium, Sharjah, United Arab Emirates	16 February 2010
129	Nawroz Mangal	United Arab Emirates	ICC Global Cricket Academy, Dubai, United Arab Emirates	30 November 2014
131*	Mohammad Shahzad	Zimbabwe	Sharjah Cricket Stadium, Sharjah, United Arab Emirates	29 December 2015
162	Ibrahim Zadran	Sri Lanka	Pallekele International Cricket Stadium, Pallekele, Sri Lanka	30 November 2022
177	Ibrahim Zadran	England	Gaddafi Stadium, Lahore, Pakistan	26 February 2025
Last updated: 30 November 2022

==== Highest score against each opponent ====
Opposition	Score	Player	Date
Australia	129	Ibrahim Zadran	7 November 2023
Bangladesh	145	Rahmanullah Gurbaz	8 July 2023
Canada	118	Mohammad Shahzad	16 February 2010
England	177	Ibrahim Zadran	26 February 2025 ‡
Hong Kong	70	Usman Ghani	1 May 2014
India	124	Mohammad Shahzad	25 September 2018
Ireland	127	Rahmanullah Gurbaz	21 January 2021
Kenya	82	Samiullah Shinwari	5 July 2010
Netherlands	110	Mohammad Shahzad	1 September 2009
New Zealand	59	Hashmatullah Shahidi	8 June 2019 ‡
Pakistan	151	Rahmanullah Gurbaz	24 August 2023
Scotland	114*	Karim Sadiq	16 August 2010
South Africa	105	Rahmanullah Gurbaz	20 September 2024 ‡
Sri Lanka	162	Ibrahim Zadran	30 November 2022
United Arab Emirates	129	Nawroz Mangal	30 November 2014
West Indies	86	Asghar Afghan	11 November 2019
Zimbabwe	131*	Mohammad Shahzad	29 December 2015
Source: Cricinfo. Last updated: 27 February 2025.

==== Highest career average ====
A batsman's batting average is the total number of runs they have scored divided by the number of times they have been dismissed.

Rank	Average	Player	Innings	Runs	Not out	Period
1	51.06	Ibrahim Zadran†	35	1,634	3	2019–2025
2	46.00	Azmatullah Omarzai†	30	966	9	2021–2025
3	37.97	Rahmanullah Gurbaz†	48	1,785	1	2021–2025
4	35.38	Rahmat Shah†	117	3,963	5	2013–2025
5	33.66	Mohammad Shahzad	83	2,727	3	2009–2019
Qualification: 20 innings. Last updated: 27 February 2025

==== Highest Average in each batting position ====
Batting position	Batsman	Innings	Runs	Average	Span	Ref
Opener	Ibrahim Zadran†	35	1,656	51.75	2019–2025	
Number 3	Rahmat Shah†	101	3,373	34.77	2014–2024	
Number 4	Hashmatullah Shahidi†	62	1,904	36.61	2014–2024	
Number 5	Samiullah Shinwari	20	620	38.75	2009–2019	
Number 6	Najibullah Zadran†	25	649	32.45	2014–2023	
Number 7	Najibullah Zadran†	28	735	31.95	2014–2023	
Number 8	Rashid Khan†	46	676	17.78	2015–2024	
Number 9	Rashid Khan†	30	550	21.15	2016–2025	
Number 10	Dawlat Zadran	25	252	28.00	2012–2019	
Number 11	Shapoor Zadran	17	35	17.50	2010–2019	
Last updated: 3 March 2025. Qualification: Min 20 innings batted at position

==== Most half-centuries ====
A half-century is a score of between 50 and 99 runs. Statistically, once a batsman's score reaches 100, it is no longer considered a half-century but a century. Sachin Tendulkar of India has scored the most half-centuries in ODIs with 96. He is followed by the Sri Lanka's Kumar Sangakkara on 93, South Africa's Jacques Kallis on 86 and Afghanistan's Rahul Dravid and Pakistan's Inzamam-ul-Haq on 83. Rahmat Shah and Mohammad Shahzad hold the Afghanistan's record for most fifties.

Rank	Half centuries	Player	Innings	Runs	Period
1	28	Rahmat Shah†	105	3,724	2013–2024
2	19	Hashmatullah Shahidi†	75	2,101	2013–2024
3	16	Mohammad Nabi†	139	3,345	2009–2024
4	15	Najibullah Zadran†	84	2,060	2012–2023
5	14	Mohammad Shahzad	84	2,727	2009–2019
Last updated: 14 February 2024

==== Most centuries ====
A century is a score of 100 or more runs in a single innings.

Rahmanullah Gurbaz has scored the most centuries for Afghanistan.

Rank	Centuries	Player	Innings	Runs	Period
1	8	Rahmanullah Gurbaz†	49	1,785	2021–2025
2	6	Ibrahim Zadran†	36	1,656	2019–2025
2	6	Mohammad Shahzad	84	2,727	2009–2019
4	5	Rahmat Shah†	118	3,975	2013–2025
5	2	Karim Sadiq	22	475	2009–2016
5	2	Nawroz Mangal	48	1,139	2009–2016
5	2	Mohammad Nabi†	151	3,667	2009–2025
Last updated: 3 March 2025

==== Most Sixes ====
Rank	Sixes	Player	Innings	Period
1	113	Mohammad Nabi†	151	2009–2024
2	68	Najibullah Zadran†	84	2012–2023
3	67	Rahmanullah Gurbaz†	49	2015–2025
4	65	Asghar Afghan	108	2009–2021
5	55	Mohammad Shahzad	84	2009–2019
Last updated: 3 March 2025

==== Most Fours ====
Rank	Fours	Player	Innings	Period
1	327	Rahmat Shah†	111	2013–2024
2	323	Mohammad Shahzad	84	2009–2019
3	234	Mohammad Nabi†	145	2009–2024
4	197	Hashmatullah Shahidi†	81	2013–2024
5	178	Najibullah Zadran†	84	2012–2023
Last updated: 7 November 2024

==== Highest strike rates ====
Rank	Strike rate	Player	Runs	Balls Faced	Period
1	104.63	Rashid Khan†	1,332	1,283	2015–2024
2	99.04	Azmatullah Omarzai†	832	840	2021–2024
3	89.10	Najibullah Zadran†	2,060	2,312	2012–2023
4	89.04	Rahmanullah Gurbaz†	1,666	1,871	2021–2024
5	88.48	Mohammad Shahzad	2,727	3,082	2009–2019
Qualification= 500 balls faced. Last updated: 7 November 2024

==== Highest strike rates in an inning ====
Rank	Strike rate	Player	Runs	Balls Faced	Opposition	Venue	Date
1	245.45	Rashid Khan†	27	11	Australia	Bristol County Ground, Bristol, England	1 June 2019 ‡
2	229.41	Rashid Khan†	39*	17	Zimbabwe	Harare Sports Club, Harare, Zimbabwe	4 June 2022
3	225.00	Mohammad Nabi†	27*	12	West Indies	Harare Sports Club, Harare, Zimbabwe	25 March 2018
4	206.66	Dawlat Zadran	31*	15	Ireland	Stormont, Belfast, Northern Ireland	19 July 2016
5	205.88	Shafiqullah Shafiq	35	17	Ireland	Greater Noida Sports Complex Ground, Greater Noida, India	17 March 2017
Last updated: 4 June 2022

==== Most runs in a calendar year ====
Rank	Runs	Player	Matches	Innings	Year
1	854	Ibrahim Zadran	20	20	2023
2	722	Rahmat Shah	20	19	2018
3	656	Rahmanullah Gurbaz	20	20	2023
4	646	Rahmat Shah	20	20	2019
5	616	Rahmat Shah	12	12	2022
Last updated: 11 February 2024

==== Most runs in a series ====
Rank	Runs	Player	Matches	Innings	Series
1	724	Rahmat Shah	15	15	2020–2023 ICC Cricket World Cup Super League
2	582	Rahmanullah Gurbaz	15	15	2020–2023 ICC Cricket World Cup Super League
3	443	Hashmatullah Shahidi	14	14	2020–2023 ICC Cricket World Cup Super League
4	431	Ibrahim Zadran	7	7	2020–2023 ICC Cricket World Cup Super League
5	388	Najibullah Zadran	15	13	2020–2023 ICC Cricket World Cup Super League
Last updated: 8 July 2023

==== Most ducks ====
A duck refers to a batsman being dismissed without scoring a run.

Rank	Ducks	Player	Matches	Innings	Period
1	12	Mujeeb Ur Rahman†	75	40	2017–2024
2	8	Rashid Khan†	106	83	2015–2024
3	7	Dawlat Zadran	82	56	2011–2019
3	7	Gulbadin Naib†	84	73	2011–2024
3	7	Asghar Afghan	114	108	2009–2021
Last updated: 7 November 2024

== Bowling records ==
=== Most career wickets ===
A bowler takes the wicket of a batsman when the form of dismissal is bowled, caught, leg before wicket, stumped or hit wicket. If the batsman is dismissed by run out, obstructing the field, handling the ball, hitting the ball twice or timed out the bowler does not receive credit.

Rashid Khan is the highest wicket taker for Afghanistan.

Rank	Wickets	Player	Matches	Innings	Average	SR	Period
1	195	Rashid Khan†	108	103	19.98	28.57	2015–2024
2	172	Mohammad Nabi†	167	161	32.47	45.54	2009–2024
3	115	Dawlat Zadran	82	80	29.76	32.77	2011–2019
4	101	Mujeeb Ur Rahman†	75	74	28.34	39.28	2017–2023
5	73	Gulbadin Naib†	86	78	35.86	38.75	2011–2024
Last updated: 12 November 2024

=== Most wickets against each team ===
Opposition	Wickets	Player	Matches	Innings	Span	Ref
Australia	4	Shapoor Zadran	2	2	2012–2015	
Bangladesh	24	Rashid Khan†	16	16	2016–2024	
Canada	10	Samiullah Shinwari†	5	5	2010–2011	
England	5	Azmatullah Omarzai†	2	2	2023–2025	
Hong Kong	5	Mohammad Nabi†	2	2	2014–2018	
India	5	Rashid Khan†	3	3	2018–2023	
India	5	Mohammad Nabi†	4	4	2014–2023	
Ireland	55	Rashid Khan†	26	25	2016–2021	
Kenya	13	Hamid Hassan†	4	4	2010–2013	
Netherlands	8	Mujeeb Ur Rahman†	4	4	2022–2023	
New Zealand	3	Aftab Alam†	1	1	2019–2019	
Pakistan	9	Mujeeb Ur Rahman†	6	6	2018–2023	
Scotland	14	Hamid Hassan†	10	9	2009–2019	
South Africa	9	Rashid Khan†	5	5	2019–2025	
Sri Lanka	13	Mohammad Nabi†	15	14	2014–2024	
United Arab Emirates	9	Dawlat Zadran†	6	6	2014–2018	
West Indies	15	Rashid Khan†	9	8	2017–2019	
Zimbabwe	50	Rashid Khan†	24	22	2015–2024	
Last updated: 3 March 2025

=== Fastest wicket taker ===
Wickets	Bowler	Match	Record Date	Reference
50	Hamid Hassan	26	22 February 2015	
50	Rashid Khan	26	24 March 2017	
100	Rashid Khan	44	25 March 2018	
150	Rashid Khan	80	28 February 2022	
Last updated: 28 February 2022

=== Best figures in an innings ===
Bowling figures refers to the number of the wickets a bowler has taken and the number of runs conceded.

Rashid Khan holds the Afghanistan record for best bowling figures.

Rank	Figures	Player	Opposition	Venue	Date
1	7/18	Rashid Khan	West Indies	Darren Sammy National Cricket Stadium, Gros Islet, Saint Lucia	9 June 2017
2	6/26	Allah Mohammad Ghazanfar	Bangladesh	Sharjah Cricket Stadium, Sharjah, United Arab Emirates	6 November 2024
3	6/43	Rashid Khan	Ireland	Shaheed Vijay Singh Pathik Sports Complex, Greater Noida, India	17 March 2017
3	6/43	Gulbadin Naib	Ireland	Stormont, Belfast, Northern Ireland	21 May 2019
5	5/17	Mohammad Nabi	Ireland	Sharjah Cricket Stadium, Sharjah, United Arab Emirates	12 March 2024
Last updated: 6 November 2024

=== Best figures in an innings – progression of record ===
Figures	Player	Opposition	Venue	Date
3/33	Hamid Hassan	Scotland	Willowmoore Park, Benoni, South Africa	2009
4/24	Shapoor Zadran	Netherlands	VRA Cricket Ground, Amstelveen, Netherlands	2009
4/41	Hamid Hassan	Kenya	Sharjah Cricket Stadium, Sharjah, United Arab Emirates	2013–14
5/32	Rahmat Shah †	United Arab Emirates	Kinrara Academy Oval, Kuala Lumpur, Malaysia	2014
6/43	Rashid Khan †	Ireland	Greater Noida Sports Complex Ground, Greater Noida, India	2016–17
7/18	Rashid Khan †	West Indies	Darren Sammy National Cricket Stadium, Gros Islet, Saint Lucia	2017
Last updated: 1 July 2020

=== Best Bowling Figure against each opponent ===
Opposition	Player	Figures	Date
Australia	Karim Sadiq	2/22	25 August 2012
Bangladesh	Allah Mohammad Ghazanfar	6/26	6 November 2024
Canada	Samiullah Shinwari	4/31	16 February 2010
Canada	Mohammad Nabi	4/31	7 August 2011
England	Rashid Khan	3/37	15 October 2023 ‡
Hong Kong	Mujeeb Ur Rahman	3/26	8 March 2018
India	Mohammad Nabi	2/33	22 June 2019 ‡
Ireland	Rashid Khan	6/43	17 March 2017
Ireland	Gulbadin Naib	6/43	21 May 2019
Kenya	Hamid Hassan	4/19	2 October 2013
Netherlands	Shapoor Zadran	4/24	30 August 2009
New Zealand	Aftab Alam	3/45	8 June 2019 ‡
Pakistan	Mujeeb Ur Rahman	3/33	22 August 2023
Scotland	Gulbadin Naib	4/31	6 March 2013
South Africa	Rashid Khan	5/19	20 September 2024
Sri Lanka	Mohammad Nabi	4/30	4 June 2019 ‡
United Arab Emirates	Rahmat Shah	5/32	2 May 2014
West Indies	Rashid Khan	7/18	9 June 2017
Zimbabwe	Rashid Khan	5/24	13 February 2018
Last updated: 6 November 2024.

=== Best career average ===
A bowler's bowling average is the total number of runs they have conceded divided by the number of wickets they have taken. Afghanistan's Rashid Khan holds the record for the best career average in ODIs with 18.54. Joel Garner, West Indian cricketer, and a member of the highly regarded late 1970s and early 1980s West Indies cricket teams, is second behind Rashid with an overall career average of 18.84 runs per wicket.

Rank	Average	Player	Wickets	Runs	Balls	Period
1	20.48	Rashid Khan †	183	3,748	5,300	2015–2023
2	28.34	Mujeeb Ur Rahman †	101	2,863	3,968	2017–2023
3	29.56	Mirwais Ashraf	46	1,360	2,009	2009–2016
4	29.76	Dawlat Zadran	115	3,423	3,769	2011–2019
5	32.66	Mohammad Nabi †	164	5,357	7,490	2009–2024
Qualification: 2,000 balls. Last updated: 14 February 2024

=== Best career economy rate ===
A bowler's economy rate is the total number of runs they have conceded divided by the number of overs they have bowled. West Indies' Joel Garner, holds the ODI record for the best career economy rate with 3.09. Afghanistan's Mujeeb Ur Rahman, with a rate of 3.94 runs per over conceded over his 40-match ODI career, is the highest Afghanistan on the list.

Rank	Economy rate	Player	Wickets	Runs	Balls	Period
1	4.06	Mirwais Ashraf	46	1,360	2,009	2009–2016
2	4.24	Rashid Khan †	183	3,748	5,300	2015–2023
3	4.29	Mohammad Nabi †	164	5,357	7,490	2009–2024
4	4.32	Mujeeb Ur Rahman †	101	2,863	3,968	2017–2023
5	4.91	Samiullah Shinwari	46	1,279	2,111	2009–2019
Qualification: 2,000 balls. Last updated: 14 February 2024

=== Best career strike rate ===
A bowler's strike rate is the total number of balls they have bowled divided by the number of wickets they have taken. The top bowler with the best ODI career strike rate is South Africa's Lungi Ngidi with strike rate of 23.2 balls per wicket. Rashid Khan is at 7th position in this list.

Rank	Strike rate	Player	Wickets	Runs	Balls	Period
1	28.96	Rashid Khan †	183	3,748	5,300	2015–2023
2	32.7	Dawlat Zadran	115	3,423	3,769	2011–2019
3	38.54	Gulbadin Naib †	72	2,561	2,775	2011–2024
4	29.28	Mujeeb Ur Rahman †	101	2,863	3,968	2017–2023
5	43.6	Mirwais Ashraf	46	1,360	2,009	2009–2016
Qualification: 2,000 balls. Last updated: 14 February 2024

=== Most four-wickets (& over) hauls in an innings ===
Rashid Khan is the highest rated Afghani bowler on the list of most four-wicket hauls with Pakistan's Waqar Younis, Sri Lanka's Muttiah Muralitharan and Australia's Brett Lee leading this list in ODIs.

Rank	Four-wicket hauls	Player	Matches	Balls	Wickets	Period
1	6	Rashid Khan †	87	4,373	163	2015–2023
2	4	Mohammad Nabi †	139	2,535	65	2009–2023
3	3	Dawlat Zadran	82	3,769	115	2019-2019
3	3	Mujeeb Ur Rahman †	57	3,021	81	2017–2023
Last updated: 8 June 2023

=== Most five-wicket hauls in a match ===
A five-wicket haul refers to a bowler taking five wickets in a single innings. Rashid Khan is the highest ranked Afghanistan on the list of most five-wicket hauls which is headed by Pakistan's Waqar Younis with 13 such hauls.

Rank	Five-wicket hauls	Player	Matches	Innings	Wickets	Period
1	5	Rashid Khan†	106	101	192	2015–2024
2	1	Allah Ghazanfar†	6	6	10	2024–2024
2	1	Rahmat Shah†	115	29	15	2013–2024
2	1	Hamid Hassan	38	37	59	2009–2019
2	1	Mujeeb Ur Rahman†	75	74	101	2017–2023
2	1	Gulbadin Naib†	84	77	73	2011–2024
2	1	Mohammad Nabi†	165	159	171	2009–2024
Last updated: 7 November 2024

=== Best economy rates in an inning ===
The best economy rate in an inning, when a minimum of 30 balls are delivered by the player, is by West Indies player Phil Simmons economy of 0.30 during his spell of 3 runs for 4 wickets in 10 overs against Pakistan at Sydney Cricket Ground in the 1991–92 Australian Tri-Series. Nabi holds the Afghanistan record during his spell in against Kenya at Sharjah.

Rank	Economy	Player	Overs	Runs	Wickets	Opposition	Venue	Date
1	1.17	Mohammad Nabi	8.3	10	2	Kenya	Sharjah Cricket Stadium, Sharjah, United Arab Emirates	4 October 2013
2	1.40	Shapoor Zadran	5	7	1	Zimbabwe	Sharjah Cricket Stadium, Sharjah, United Arab Emirates	19 February 2018
2	1.40	Mujeeb Ur Rahman	10	14	3	Ireland	Rajiv Gandhi International Cricket Stadium, Dehradun, India	28 February 2019
3	1.42	Karim Sadiq	7	10	2	Kenya	Sharjah Cricket Stadium, Sharjah, United Arab Emirates	4 October 2013
4	1.44	Rashid Khan	9	13	2	Bangladesh	Sheikh Zayed Cricket Stadium, Abu Dhabi, United Arab Emirates	20 September 2018
Qualification: 30 balls bowled Last updated: 1 July 2020

=== Best strike rates in an inning ===
The best strike rate in an inning, when a minimum of 4 wickets are taken by the player, is shared by Sunil Dhaniram of Canada, Paul Collingwood of England and Virender Sehwag of India when they achieved a strike rate of 4.2 balls per wicket. Rahmat Shah holds the Afghan record with a strike rate of 6.6 against UAE in May 2014 during the 2014 ACC Premier League in Malaysia.

Rank	Strike rate	Player	Wickets	Runs	Balls	Opposition	Venue	Date
1	6.6	Rahmat Shah	5	32	33	United Arab Emirates	Kinrara Academy Oval, Kuala Lumpur, Malaysia	2 May 2014
2	7.4	Rashid Khan	7	18	52	West Indies	Darren Sammy National Cricket Stadium, Gros Islet, Saint Lucia	9 June 2017
3	8.5	Rashid Khan	4	26	34	Zimbabwe	Sharjah Cricket Stadium, Sharjah, United Arab Emirates	9 February 2018
4	9.0	Gulbadin Naib	4	27	36	Zimbabwe	Harare Sports Club, Harare, Zimbabwe	21 February 2017
5	9.3	Gulbadin Naib	6	43	56	Ireland	Stormont, Belfast, Northern Ireland	21 May 2019
Last updated: 1 July 2020

=== Worst figures in an innings ===
The worst figures in an ODI came in the 5th One Day International between South Africa at home to Australia in 2006. Australia's Mick Lewis returned figures of 0/113 from his 10 overs in the second innings of the match. The worst figures by an Afghanistan is 0/108 that came off the bowling of Rashid Khan in the 2019 Cricket World Cup against England.

Rank	Figures	Player	Overs	Opposition	Venue	Date
1	0/110	Rashid Khan †	9	England	Old Trafford, Manchester, England	18 June 2019 ‡
2	0/96	Dawlat Zadran	9	Zimbabwe	Sharjah Cricket Stadium, Sharjah, United Arab Emirates	11 February 2018
3	0/84	Mohammad Nabi †	10	Australia	WACA, Perth, Australia	4 March 2015 ‡
4	0/77	Fazalhaq Farooqi †	9	Sri Lanka	Pallekele International Cricket Stadium, Kandy, Sri Lanka	9 February 2024
5	0/73	Gulbadin Naib †	9.4	Pakistan	Headingley, Leeds, England	29 June 2019 ‡
Last updated: 14 February 2024

=== Most runs conceded in a match ===
Mick Lewis also holds the dubious distinction of most runs conceded in an ODI during the aforementioned match. The Afghanistan record in ODIs is held by Rashid Khan in the aforementioned World Cup game in 2019.

Rank	Figures	Player	Overs	Opposition	Venue	Date
1	0/110	Rashid Khan †	9	England	Old Trafford, Manchester, England	18 June 2019 ‡
2	2/101	Dawlat Zadran	10	Australia	WACA, Perth, Australia	4 March 2015 ‡
3	0/96	Dawlat Zadran	9	Zimbabwe	Sharjah Cricket Stadium, Sharjah, United Arab Emirates	11 February 2018
4	2/89	Shapoor Zadran	10	Australia	WACA, Perth, Australia	4 March 2015 ‡
5	1/85	Gulbadin Naib	8	Zimbabwe	Sharjah Cricket Stadium, Sharjah, United Arab Emirates	11 February 2018
Last updated:1 July 2020

=== Most wickets in a calendar year ===
Pakistan's Saqlain Mushtaq holds the record for most wickets taken in a year when he took 69 wickets in 1997 in 36 ODIs. Afghanistan's Rashid Khan is joint-21st on the list having taken 48 wickets in 2018.

Rank	Wickets	Player	Matches	Year
1	48	Rashid Khan	20	2018
2	43	Rashid Khan	16	2017
3	37	Mujeeb Ur Rahman	20	2018
4	24	Mohammad Nabi	20	2018
5	23	Rashid Khan	12	2022
Last updated: 8 June 2023

=== Most wickets in a series ===
1998–99 Carlton and United Series involving Australia, England and Sri Lanka and the 2019 Cricket World Cup saw the records set for the most wickets taken by a bowler in an ODI series when Australian pacemen Glenn McGrath and Mitchell Starc achieved a total of 27 wickets during the series, respectively. Afghanistan's Rashid Khan, twice, and Mujeeb Ur Rahman have taken 16 wickets in a series, which is the most for an Afghan bowler.

Rank	Wickets	Player	Matches	Series
1	30	Rashid Khan	15	2020–2023 ICC Cricket World Cup Super League
2	17	Fazalhaq Farooqi	10	2020–2023 ICC Cricket World Cup Super League
3	16	Rashid Khan	5	Ireland vs Afghanistan in India in 2017
3	16	Rashid Khan	5	Zimbabwe vs Afghanistan in UAE in 2018
3	16	Mujeeb Ur Rahman	7	2018 Cricket World Cup Qualifier
3	16	Mujeeb Ur Rahman	15	2020–2023 ICC Cricket World Cup Super League
Last updated: 8 June 2023

== Wicket-keeping records ==
The wicket-keeper is a specialist fielder who stands behind the stumps being guarded by the batsman on strike and is the only member of the fielding side allowed to wear gloves and leg pads.

=== Most career dismissals ===
A wicket-keeper can be credited with the dismissal of a batsman in two ways, caught or stumped. A fair catch is taken when the ball is caught fully within the field of play without it bouncing after the ball has touched the striker's bat or glove holding the bat, Laws 5.6.2.2 and 5.6.2.3 state that the hand or the glove holding the bat shall be regarded as the ball striking or touching the bat while a stumping occurs when the wicket-keeper puts down the wicket while the batsman is out of his ground and not attempting a run. Afghanistan's Mohammad Shahzad is joint 35th in taking most dismissals in ODIs as a designated wicket-keeper.

Rank	Dismissals	Player	Matches	Innings	Period
1	88	Mohammad Shahzad	84	82	2009–2019
2	26	Ikram Alikhil†	31	28	2019–2024
3	25	Rahmanullah Gurbaz†	49	35	2021–2025
4	22	Afsar Zazai	17	16	2014–2017
5	11	Shafiqullah Shafiq	24	10	2009–2018
Last updated: 3 March 2025

=== Most career catches ===
Shahzad is the highest ranked Afghan wicket-keeper in taking most catches in ODIs as a designated wicket-keeper.

Rank	Catches	Player	Matches	Innings	Period
1	63	Mohammad Shahzad	84	82	2009–2019
2	20	Afsar Zazai	17	16	2014–2017
3	14	Rahmanullah Gurbaz †	20	20	2021–2023
4	9	Ikram Alikhil †	24	21	2019–2024
5	8	Shafiqullah Shafiq	24	10	2009–2018
Last updated: 14 February 2024

=== Most career stumpings ===
Dhoni holds the record for the most stumpings in ODIs with 123 followed by Sri Lankans Sangakkara and Romesh Kaluwitharana.

Rank	Stumpings	Player	Matches	Innings	Period
1	25	Mohammad Shahzad	84	82	2009–2019
2	4	Ikram Alikhil †	24	21	2019–2024
3	3	Shafiqullah Shafiq	24	10	2009–2018
4	2	Afsar Zazai	17	16	2014–2017
4	2	Rahmanullah Gurbaz †	20	20	2021–2023
Last updated: 14 February 2024

=== Most dismissals in an innings ===
Ten wicket-keepers on 15 occasions have taken six dismissals in a single innings in an ODI. Adam Gilchrist of Australia alone has done it six times. No Afghan wicket keeper has so far achieved this.

The feat of taking 5 dismissals in an innings has been achieved by 49 wicket-keepers on 87 occasions including Mohommad Shahzad once.

Rank	Dismissals	Player	Opposition	Venue	Date
1	5	Mohammad Shahzad	Canada	Maple Leaf North-West Ground, King City, Canada	7 August 2011
2	4	Mohammad Shahzad	Scotland	Cambusdoon New Ground, Ayr, Scotland	16 August 2010
3	3	Mohammad Shahzad	Kenya	VRA Cricket Ground, Amstelveen, Netherlands	5 July 2010
3	3	Mohammad Shahzad	Scotland	Hazelaarweg Stadion, Rotterdam, Netherlands	9 July 2010
3	3	Mohammad Shahzad	Scotland	Sharjah Cricket Stadium, Sharjah, United Arab Emirates	6 March 2013
3	3	Mohammad Shahzad	Kenya	Sharjah Cricket Stadium, Sharjah, United Arab Emirates	2 October 2013
3	3	Afsar Zazai	Scotland	ICC Global Cricket Academy, Dubai, United Arab Emirates	8 January 2015
3	3	Afsar Zazai	Scotland	Carisbrook, Dunedin, New Zealand	26 February 2015
3	3	Mohammad Shahzad	Zimbabwe	Queens Sports Club, Bulawayo, Zimbabwe	24 October 2015
3	3	Mohammad Shahzad	Ireland	Stormont, Belfast, Northern Ireland	17 July 2016
3	3	Mohammad Shahzad	Bangladesh	Shere-e-Bangla Stadium, Mirpur, Bangladesh	1 October 2016
Last updated: 1 July 2020

=== Most dismissals in a series ===
Gilchrist also holds the ODIs record for the most dismissals taken by a wicket-keeper in a series. He made 27 dismissals during the 1998-99 Carlton & United Series. Afghanistan record is held by Mohammad Shahzad when he made 13 dismissals during the 2011–13 ICC World Cricket League Championship.

Rank	Dismissals	Player	Matches	Innings	Series
1	13	Mohammad Shahzad	9	9	2011–13 ICC World Cricket League Championship
2	11	Rahmanullah Gurbaz †	15	15	2020–2023 ICC Cricket World Cup Super League
3	8	Mohammad Shahzad	6	6	2018 ICC Cricket World Cup Qualifier
4	7	Mohammad Shahzad	6	5	2010 ICC World Cricket League Division One
4	7	Afsar Zazai	4	4	Dubai Triangular Series 2014-15
4	7	Afsar Zazai	6	6	2015 Cricket World Cup
4	7	Mohammad Shahzad	5	5	Ireland vs Afghanistan in India in 2017
Last updated: 14 February 2024

== Fielding records ==
=== Most career catches ===
Caught is one of the nine methods a batsman can be dismissed in cricket. (Note: In 2017, The Laws of Cricket were amended, reducing the methods of dismissals from ten to nine, with handled the ball now covered as part of obstructing the field.) The majority of catches are caught in the slips, located behind the batsman, next to the wicket-keeper, on the off side of the field. Most slip fielders are top order batsmen.

Sri Lanka's Mahela Jayawardene holds the record for the most catches in ODIs by a non-wicket-keeper with 218, followed by Ricky Ponting of Australia on 160 and India's Mohammad Azharuddin with 156.Mohammad Nabi holds the Afghan record with 55 catches.

Rank	Catches	Player	Matches	Innings	Period
1	75	Mohammad Nabi†	165	162	2009–2024
2	40	Najibullah Zadran†	92	91	2012–2023
3	33	Rashid Khan†	106	103	2015–2024
4	27	Rahmat Shah†	115	111	2013–2024
5	24	Gulbadin Naib†	84	82	2011–2024
Last updated: 7 November 2024

=== Most catches in an innings ===
South Africa's Jonty Rhodes is the only fielder to have taken five catches in an innings.

The feat of taking 4 catches in an innings has been achieved by 42 fielders on 44 occasions but no one from Afghanistan.

Rank	Dismissals	Player	Opposition	Venue	Date
1	3	Mohammad Nabi †	Netherlands	VRA Cricket Ground, Amstelveen, Netherlands	30 August 2009
1	3	Rashid Khan †	Scotland	Grange CC Ground, Edinburgh, Scotland	6 July 2016
1	3	Mohammad Nabi †	Ireland	Greater Noida Sports Complex Ground, Greater Noida, India	17 March 2017
1	3	Ihsanullah Janat	Zimbabwe	Sharjah Cricket Stadium, Sharjah, United Arab Emirates	16 February 2018
1	3	Najibullah Zadran †	Hong Kong	Queens Sports Club, Bulawayo, Zimbabwe	8 March 2018
1	3	Noor Ali Zadran †	West Indies	Bharat Ratna Shri Atal Bihari Vajpayee Ekana Cricket Stadium, Lucknow, India	9 November 2019
1	3	Gulbadin Naib †	Ireland	Sheikh Zayed Cricket Stadium, Abu Dhabi, UAE	24 January 2021
Last updated: 27 January 2021

=== Most catches in a series ===
The 2019 Cricket World Cup, which was won by England for the first time, saw the record set for the most catches taken by a non-wicket-keeper in an ODI series. Englishman batsman and captain of the England Test team Joe Root took 13 catches in the series as well as scored 556 runs. Afghanistan's Najibullah Zadran is the leading Afghan fielder in this list with 8 catches taken during the 2018 ICC Cricket World Cup Qualifier.

Rank	Catches	Player	Matches	Innings	Series
1	8	Gulbadin Naib	10	10	Cricket World Cup Super League, 2020-2023
1	8	Najibullah Zadran	7	7	2018 ICC Cricket World Cup Qualifier
2	5	Mohammad Nabi	9	9	2011–13 ICC World Cricket League Championship
2	5	Mohammad Nabi	5	5	Afghan cricket team against Zimbabwe in the UAE in 2015–16
2	5	Najibullah Zadran	4	4	Afghan cricket team in Ireland in 2016
2	5	Ihsanullah Janat	4	4	Zimbabwean cricket team against Afghanistan in the UAE in 2017-18
2	5	Mohammad Nabi	9	9	2019 Cricket World Cup
2	5	Rahmat Shah	9	9	2019 Cricket World Cup
Last updated: 14 February 2024

== All-round Records ==
=== 1000 runs and 100 wickets ===
A total of 64 players have achieved the double of 1000 runs and 100 wickets in their ODI career.

Rank	Player	Average Difference	Period	Matches	Runs	Bat Avg	Wickets	Bowl Avg
1	Rashid Khan †	-0.83	2015–2023	103	1,316	19.64	183	20.48
2	Mohammad Nabi †	-5.79	2009–2024	159	3,359	26.87	164	32.66
Last updated: 14 February 2024

=== 250 runs and 5 wickets in a series ===
A total of 50 players on 103 occasions have achieved the double of 250 runs and 5 wickets in a series.

Player	Matches	Runs	Wickets	Series
Mohammad Nabi †	7	257	8	2018 ICC Cricket World Cup Qualifier
Azmatullah Omarzai †	9	353	7	ICC Cricket World Cup 2023
Last updated: 14 February 2024

== Other records ==
=== Most career matches ===
India's Sachin Tendulkar holds the record for the most ODI matches played with 463, with former captains Mahela Jayawardene and Sanath Jayasuriya being second and third having represented Sri Lanka on 443 and 441 occasions, respectively. Mohammad Nabi is the most experienced Afghan player.

Rank	Matches	Player	Runs	Wkts	Period
1	173	Mohammad Nabi†	3,667	176	2009–2025
2	123	Rahmat Shah†	3,975	15	2013–2025
3	114	Rashid Khan†	1,384	199	2015–2025
3	114	Asghar Afghan	2,424	3	2009–2023
5	92	Najibullah Zadran†	2,060	-	2012–2023
Last updated: 3 March 2025

=== Most consecutive career matches ===
Tendulkar also holds the record for the most consecutive ODI matches played with 185. He broke Richie Richardson's long standing record of 132 matches.

Rank	Matches	Player	Period
1	111	Mohammad Nabi †	2009–2019
2	87	Rahmat Shah †	2016–2023
Last updated: 14 February 2024

=== Most matches as captain ===
Ricky Ponting, who led the Australian cricket team from 2002 to 2012, holds the record for the most matches played as captain in ODIs with 230 (including 1 as captain of ICC World XI team). Asghar Afghan, the current skipper, has led the Afghanistan team the most number of times.

Rank	Matches	Player	Won	Lost	Tied	NR	Win %	Period
1	59	Asghar Afghan	34	21	1	3	61.60	2015–2021
2	43	Hashmatullah Shahidi†	21	21	0	1	50.00	2022–2024
3	28	Mohammad Nabi	13	15	0	0	46.42	2013–2015
4	22	Nawroz Mangal	12	10	0	0	54.54	2009–2012
5	12	Gulbadin Naib	2	10	0	0	16.66	2019–2019
Last updated: 12 November 2024

==== Most man of the match awards ====
Rank	M.O.M awards	Player	Matches	Period
1	8	Rashid Khan†	106	2015–2024
2	7	Mohammad Shahzad	84	2009–2019
2	7	Rahmat Shah†	115	2013–2024
2	7	Mohammad Nabi†	165	2009–2024
5	6	Rahmanullah Gurbaz†	44	2021–2024
Last updated: 7 November 2024

==== Most man of the series awards ====
Rank	M.O.S awards	Player	Matches	Period
1	2	Rahmanullah Gurbaz†	46	2021–2024
1	2	Rashid Khan†	108	2015–2024
1	2	Mohammad Nabi†	167	2009–2024
4	1	Ibrahim Zadran†	33	2019–2024
4	1	Fazalhaq Farooqi†	37	2022–2024
4	1	Mohammad Shahzad	84	2009–2019
4	1	Rahmat Shah†	117	2013–2024
Last updated: 12 November 2024

=== Youngest players on Debut ===
The youngest player to play in an ODI match is claimed to be Hasan Raza at the age of 14 years and 233 days. Making his debut for Pakistan against Zimbabwe on 30 October 1996, there is some doubt as to the validity of Raza's age at the time. The youngest Afghanistan to play ODIs is Mujeeb Ur Rahman who at the age of 16 years and 252 days debuted in the first ODI of the series against Ireland in December 2017.

Rank	Age	Player	Opposition	Venue	Date
1	16 years and 252 days	Mujeeb Ur Rahman	Ireland	Sharjah Cricket Stadium, Sharjah, United Arab Emirates	15 December 2017
2	17 years and 2 days	Naveen-ul-Haq	Bangladesh	Shere-e-Bangla Stadium, Mirpur, Bangladesh	25 September 2016
3	17 years and 28 days	Rashid Khan	Zimbabwe	Queens Sports Club, Bulawayo, Zimbabwe	18 October 2015
4	17 years and 78 days	Aftab Alam	Canada	Sharjah Cricket Stadium, Sharjah, United Arab Emirates	16 February 2010
5	17 years and 162 days	Usman Ghani	Hong Kong	Kinrara Academy Oval, Kuala Lumpur, Malaysia	1 May 2014
Last updated: 1 July 2020

=== Oldest players on debut ===
Rank	Age	Player	Opposition	Venue	Date
1	26 years and 362 days	Rokhan Barakzai	Zimbabwe	Sharjah Cricket Stadium, Sharjah, United Arab Emirates	29 December 2015
2	26 years and 195 days	Abdul Malik	South Africa	Sharjah Cricket Stadium, Sharjah, United Arab Emirates	22 September 2015
3	26 years and 50 days	Najeeb Tarakai	Ireland	Greater Noida Sports Complex Ground, Greater Noida, India	24 March 2017
4	25 years and 314 days	Ahmed Shah	Netherlands	VRA Cricket Ground, Amstelveen, Netherlands	30 August 2009
5	25 years and 193 days	Zia-ur-Rehman	Bangladesh	Zahur Ahmed Chowdhury Stadium, Chattogram, Bangladesh	11 July 2023
Last updated: 7 November 2024

=== Oldest players ===
Rank	Age	Player	Opposition	Venue	Date
1	40 years and 58 days	Mohammad Nabi†	Australia	Gaddafi Stadium, Lahore, Pakistan	28 February 2025
2	33 years and 269 days	Gulbadin Naib†	Australia	Gaddafi Stadium, Lahore, Pakistan	28 February 2025
3	33 years and 31 days	Asghar Afghan	Ireland	Zayed Cricket Stadium, Abu Dhabi, United Arab Emirates	26 January 2021
4	32 years and 145 days	Mohammad Shahzad	Sri Lanka	Sophia Gardens, Cardiff, England	4 June 2019
5	32 years and 78 days	Nawroz Mangal	Bangladesh	Shere Bangla National Stadium, Mirpur, Bangladesh	1 October 2016
Last updated: 3 March 2025

== Partnership records ==
In cricket, two batsmen are always present at the crease batting together in a partnership. This partnership will continue until one of them is dismissed, retires or the innings comes to a close.

=== Highest partnerships by wicket ===
A wicket partnership describes the number of runs scored before each wicket falls. The first wicket partnership is between the opening batsmen and continues until the first wicket falls. The second wicket partnership then commences between the not out batsman and the number three batsman. This partnership continues until the second wicket falls. The third wicket partnership then commences between the not out batsman and the new batsman. This continues down to the tenth wicket partnership. When the tenth wicket has fallen, there is no batsman left to partner so the innings is closed.

Wicket	Runs	First batsman	Second batsman	Opposition	Venue	Date	Scorecard
1st wicket	256	Rahmanullah Gurbaz	Ibrahim Zadran	Bangladesh	Zohur Ahmed Chowdhury Stadium, Chattogram, Bangladesh	8 July 2023	Scorecard
2nd wicket	218*	Javed Ahmadi	Mohammad Shahzad	Scotland	Cambusdoon New Ground, Ayr, Scotland	16 August 2010	Scorecard
3rd wicket	184	Rahmat Shah	Hashmatullah Shahidi	Ireland	Sheikh Zayed Cricket Stadium, Abu Dhabi, United Arab Emirates	24 January 2021	Scorecard
4th wicket	144*	Nawroz Mangal	Samiullah Shinwari	Scotland	Sharjah Cricket Stadium, Sharjah, United Arab Emirates	6 March 2013	Scorecard
5th wicket	158	Rahmat Shah	Najibullah Zadran	Zimbabwe	Sharjah Cricket Stadium, Sharjah, United Arab Emirates	9 February 2018	Scorecard
6th wicket	242	Mohammad Nabi	Azmatullah Omarzai	Sri Lanka	Pallekele Cricket Stadium, Kandy, Sri Lanka	9 February 2024	Scorecard
7th wicket	96	Gulbadin Naib	Rashid Khan	Ireland	Greater Noida Sports Complex Ground, Greater Noida, India	19 March 2017	Scorecard
8th wicket	95*	Gulbadin Naib	Rashid Khan	Bangladesh	Sheikh Zayed Cricket Stadium, Abu Dhabi, United Arab Emirates	20 September 2018	Scorecard
9th wicket	71*	Shafiqullah Shafiq	Dawlat Zadran	Ireland	Greater Noida Sports Complex Ground, Greater Noida, India	19 March 2017	Scorecard
10th wicket	64	Dawlat Zadran	Mujeeb Ur Rahman	Zimbabwe	Sharjah Cricket Stadium, Sharjah, United Arab Emirates	11 February 2018	Scorecard
Last updated: 9 February 2024

=== Highest partnerships by runs ===
The highest ODI partnership by runs for any wicket is held by the West Indian pairing of Chris Gayle and Marlon Samuels who put together a second wicket partnership of 372 runs during the 2015 Cricket World Cup against Zimbabwe in February 2015. This broke the record of 331 runs set by Indian pair of Sachin Tendulkar and Rahul Dravid against New Zealand in 1999

Wicket	Runs	First batsman	Second batsman	Opposition	Venue	Date	Scorecard
1st wicket	256	Rahmanullah Gurbaz	Ibrahim Zadran	Bangladesh	Zohur Ahmed Chowdhury Stadium, Chattogram, Bangladesh	8 July 2023	Scorecard
6th wicket	242	Mohammad Nabi	Azmatullah Omarzai	Sri Lanka	Pallekele Cricket Stadium, Kandy, Sri Lanka	9 February 2024	Scorecard
1st wicket	227	Rahmanullah Gurbaz	Ibrahim Zadran	Pakistan	Mahinda Rajapaksa International Cricket Stadium, Hambantota, Sri Lanka	24 August 2023	Scorecard
2nd wicket	218*	Mohammad Shahzad	Karim Sadiq	Scotland	Cambusdoon New Ground, Ayr, Scotland	16 August 2010	Scorecard
2nd wicket	205	Mohammad Shahzad	Noor Ali Zadran	Canada	Sharjah Cricket Stadium, Sharjah, United Arab Emirates	16 February 2010	Scorecard
2nd wicket	195	Rahmat Shah	Ibrahim Zadran	Zimbabwe	Harare Sports Club, Harare, Zimbabwe	6 June 2022	Scorecard
Last updated: 9 February 2024

=== Highest overall partnership runs by a pair ===
Rank	Runs	Innings	Players	Highest	Average	100	50	Span
1	1,624	37	Hashmatullah Shahidi & Rahmat Shah †	184	46.40	4	10	2016–2025
2	1,544	34	Ibrahim Zadran & Rahmanullah Gurbaz †	256	45.41	5	3	2022–2025
3	1,134	28	Mohammad Shahzad & Noor Ali Zadran	205	40.50	1	6	2009–2019
4	1,098	20	Ibrahim Zadran & Rahmat Shah †	195	54.90	3	6	2022–2025
5	1,076	31	Asghar Afghan & Mohammad Nabi	127	35.86	2	8	2009–2021
An asterisk (*) signifies an unbroken partnership (i.e. neither of the batsmen was dismissed before either the end of the allotted overs or the required score being reached). Last updated: 3 March 2025

== Umpiring records ==
=== Most matches umpired ===
An umpire in cricket is a person who officiates the match according to the Laws of Cricket. Two umpires adjudicate the match on the field, whilst a third umpire has access to video replays, and a fourth umpire looks after the match balls and other duties. The records below are only for on-field umpires.

Rudi Koertzen of South Africa holds the record for the most ODI matches umpired with 209. The current active Aleem Dar is currently at 208 matches. They are followed by New Zealand's Billy Bowden who officiated in 200 matches. The most experienced Afghanistan umpire is Ahmed Shah Pakteen who has stood in 12 ODI matches.

Rank	Matches	Umpire	Period
1	20	Ahmed Shah Pakteen	2017–2021
2	8	Bismillah Jan Shinwari	2018–2021
3	6	Ahmed Shah Durrani	2017–2021
4	4	Izatullah Safi	2017–2021
Last updated: 14 September 2021

== See also ==
- List of One Day International cricket records
- List of Afghanistan Test cricket records
- List of Afghanistan Twenty20 International cricket records
