= Afghan cricket team against Hong Kong in the UAE in 2015–16 =

International cricket tour

	Afghanistan	Hong Kong
- Date: 28 November 2015
Captains	Asghar Stanikzai	Tanwir Afzal

Twenty20 International series
- Results: Hong Kong won the 1-match series 1–0
Most runs	Asghar Stanikzai (51)	Tanwir Afzal (42)
Most wickets	Haseeb Amjad (1)	Karim Sadiq (2)

The Afghanistan cricket team toured the United Arab Emirates to play Hong Kong in November 2015. The tour consisted of a Twenty20 International (T20I) match and was in preparation for the 2016 Asia Cup Qualifier. Hong Kong won the one-off match by 4 wickets.

== Squads ==
Afghanistan	Hong Kong
Asghar Stanikzai (c); Afsar Zazai; Dawlat Zadran; Gulbadin Naib; Hashmatullah Shahidi; Javed Ahmadi; Mirwais Ashraf; Mohammad Shahzad; Nasir Jamal; Noor Ali Zadran; Rahmat Shah; Rashid Khan; Samiullah Shinwari; Sayed Shirzad; Shabir Noori; Sharafuddin Ashraf; Yamin Ahmadzai; Zahir Khan	Tanwir Afzal (c); Mark Chapman; Aizaz Khan; Anshuman Rath; Jamie Atkinson; Babar Hayat; Christopher Carter; Ehsan Nawaz; Haseeb Amjad; Nadeem Ahmed; Nizakat Khan; Kinchit Shah; Ninad Shah; Waqas Barkat; Waqas Khan

== Only T20I ==
28 November 2015
13:30
Scorecard

Afghanistan; 162/6 (20 overs)	v	Hong Kong; 166/6 (19.4 overs)
Asghar Stanikzai 51 (37); Haseeb Amjad 1/27 (4 overs)		Tanwir Afzal 42 (22); Karim Sadiq 2/20 (4 overs)

Hong Kong won by 4 wickets
Sheikh Zayed Cricket Stadium, Abu Dhabi
Umpires: Buddhi Pradhan (Nep) and Raveendra Wimalasiri (SL)

- Afghanistan won the toss and elected to bat.
- Rokhan Barakzai and Mohammad Nasim Baras both made their T20I debuts.
