= Devender Kumar =

Indian sports commentator

- Born: 1988 (age 37–38); Chhatarpura, Jodhpur district, Rajasthan, India
- Occupations: Cricket and sports commentator

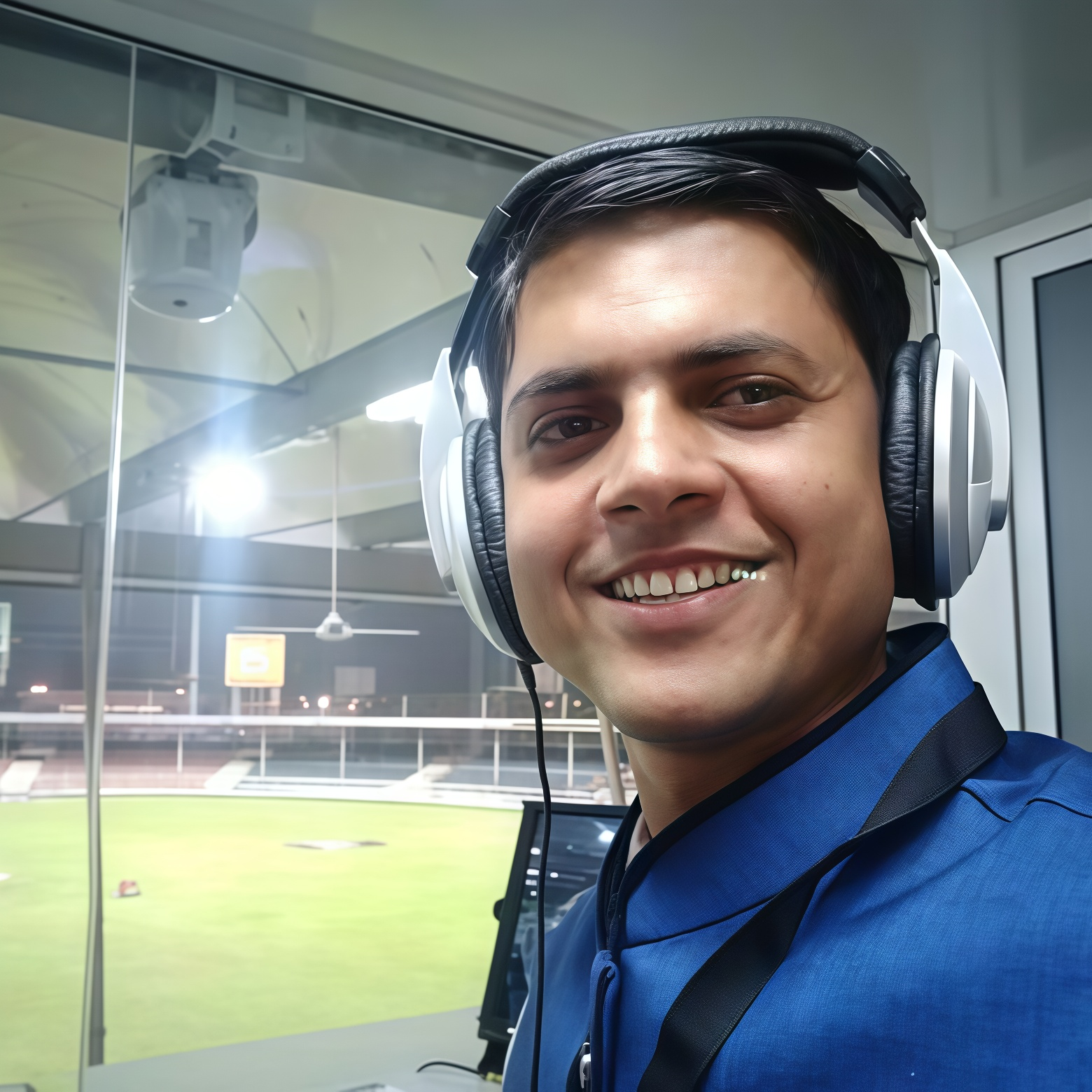

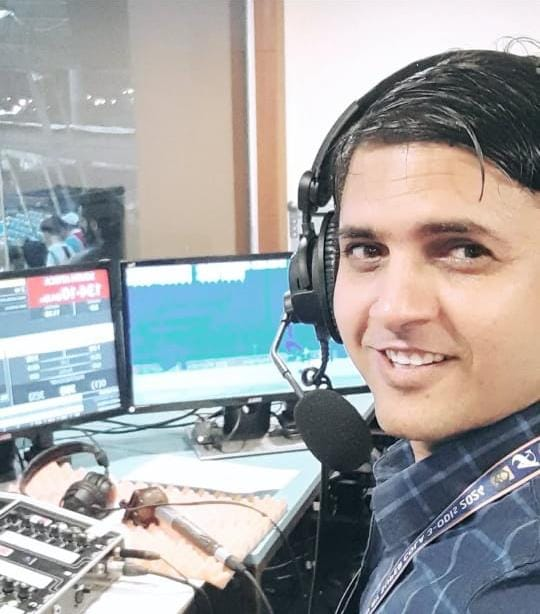

Devender Kumar (born 1988) is an Indian sports commentator. He is also a BBC Test Match Special Commentator. For his passion, bravery, and dedication to Afghanistan Cricket he also known as the "voice of Afghanistan cricket"

== Early life and education ==
Devender Kumar was born in 1988 in Chhatarpura village near Jodhpur. He was educated at a government Hindi-medium school. He holds a diploma in nursing.

From an early age, Kumar had an interest in cricket commentary. He was influenced by Tony Greig's commentary and made efforts to learn English using radio programs, such as Voice of America's Dynamic English, and English dictionaries.

== Career ==
Kumar began his professional career as a staff nurse. He was offered a job at a hospital in New York, but he declined to focus on his career as a commentator.

As a commentator, Kumar was given an opportunity to commentate on the Ireland vs. Afghanistan cricket series in 2017. He has been doing commentary for domestic and international cricket matches under the Afghanistan Cricket Board since 2017.

Apart from cricket, Kumar has also commentated for other sports, including badminton, football, handball, horse polo, kabaddi, karate, tennis, and volleyball.
