= Zimbabwean cricket team against Afghanistan in the UAE in 2017–18 =

International cricket tour

Zimbabwean cricket team against Afghanistan in 2017–18
| | Afghanistan | Zimbabwe |
- Dates: 5 – 19 February 2018
| Captains | Asghar Stanikzai | Graeme Cremer |

One Day International series
- Results: Afghanistan won the 5-match series 4–1
| Most runs | Rahmat Shah (272) | Brendan Taylor (207) |
| Most wickets | Rashid Khan (16) | Graeme Cremer (9) |
- Player of the series: Rashid Khan (Afg)

Twenty20 International series
- Results: Afghanistan won the 2-match series 2–0
| Most runs | Mohammad Nabi (85) | Hamilton Masakadza (47) |
| Most wickets | Rashid Khan (5) | Tendai Chatara (4); Blessing Muzarabani (4) |

The Zimbabwe cricket team toured the United Arab Emirates to play the Afghanistan cricket team in February 2018 to play two Twenty20 Internationals (T20Is) and five One Day International (ODI) matches. Initial reports suggested that it would include Afghanistan's first Test match since being awarded Test status by the International Cricket Council in June 2017, but instead the tour consisted of just limited overs matches. An official from Zimbabwe Cricket said that both sides were still in talks to play a Test match, but that would be at some point after the 2018 Cricket World Cup Qualifier.

Afghanistan won the T20I series 2–0, moving up to eighth place in the ICC T20I Championship, above Sri Lanka. Afghanistan won the ODI series 4–1.

== Squads ==
| T20Is | | ODIs | |
| Afghanistan | Zimbabwe | Afghanistan | Zimbabwe |
|---|---|---|---|
| Asghar Stanikzai (c); Aftab Alam; Sharafuddin Ashraf; Usman Ghani; Hameed Hassan; Rashid Khan; Mohammad Nabi; Gulbadin Naib; Karim Sadiq; Shafiqullah; Mohammad Shahzad (wk); Samiullah Shinwari; Mujeeb Ur Rahman; Najibullah Zadran; Shapoor Zadran | Graeme Cremer (c); Ryan Burl; Tendai Chatara; Tendai Chisoro; Craig Ervine; Kyle Jarvis; Hamilton Masakadza; Solomon Mire; Peter Moor; Blessing Muzarabani; Sikandar Raza; Brendan Taylor (wk); Brian Vitori; Malcolm Waller | Asghar Stanikzai (c); Javed Ahmadi; Sharafuddin Ashraf; Ihsanullah; Nasir Jamal; Rashid Khan; Mohammad Nabi; Gulbadin Naib; Rahmat Shah; Mohammad Shahzad (wk); Samiullah Shinwari; Dawlat Zadran; Mujeeb Ur Rahman; Najibullah Zadran; Shapoor Zadran | Graeme Cremer (c); Ryan Burl; Tendai Chatara; Tendai Chisoro; Craig Ervine; Kyle Jarvis; Hamilton Masakadza; Solomon Mire; Peter Moor; Tarisai Musakanda; Blessing Muzarabani; Sikandar Raza; Brendan Taylor (wk); Brian Vitori; Malcolm Waller |

== T20I series ==
=== 1st T20I ===
5 February 2018
19:00 (N)
Scorecard

| Zimbabwe; 120/9 (20 overs) | v | Afghanistan; 121/5 (14.4 overs) |
| Solomon Mire 34 (21); Rashid Khan 3/19 (4 overs) | | Mohammad Nabi 40* (27); Blessing Muzarabani 2/36 (4 overs) |

Afghanistan won by 5 wickets
Sharjah Cricket Stadium, Sharjah
Umpires: Ahmed Shah Durrani (Afg) and Bismillah Jan Shinwari (Afg)
Player of the match: Mohammad Nabi (Afg)

- Afghanistan won the toss and elected to field.
- Mujeeb Ur Rahman (Afg), Ryan Burl, Solomon Mire and Blessing Muzarabani (Zim) all made their T20I debuts.

=== 2nd T20I ===
6 February 2018
19:00 (N)
Scorecard

| Afghanistan; 158/9 (20 overs) | v | Zimbabwe; 141/5 (20 overs) |
| Mohammad Nabi 45 (26); Tendai Chatara 3/20 (4 overs) | | Sikandar Raza 40 (26); Mujeeb Ur Rahman 2/21 (4 overs) |

Afghanistan won by 17 runs
Sharjah Cricket Stadium, Sharjah
Umpires: Izatullah Safi (Afg) and Ahmed Shah Durrani (Afg)
Player of the match: Mohammad Nabi (Afg)

- Zimbabwe won the toss and elected to field.

== ODI series ==
=== 1st ODI ===
9 February 2018
14:30 (D/N)
Scorecard

| Afghanistan; 333/5 (50 overs) | v | Zimbabwe; 179 (34.4 overs) |
| Rahmat Shah 114 (110); Graeme Cremer 3/47 (10 overs) | | Solomon Mire 34 (25); Rashid Khan 4/26 (5.4 overs) |

Afghanistan won by 154 runs
Sharjah Cricket Stadium, Sharjah
Umpires: Nigel Llong (Eng) and Ahmed Shah Pakteen (Afg)
Player of the match: Rahmat Shah (Afg)

- Afghanistan won the toss and elected to bat.
- This was Afghanistan's biggest win in terms of runs against any team in ODIs and it was also their biggest win against a Test-playing nation.

=== 2nd ODI ===
11 February 2018
14:30 (D/N)
Scorecard

| Zimbabwe; 333/5 (50 overs) | v | Afghanistan; 179 (30.1 overs) |
| Brendan Taylor 125 (121); Rashid Khan 2/36 (10 overs) | | Dawlat Zadran 47* (29); Graeme Cremer 4/41 (5.1 overs) |

Zimbabwe won by 154 runs
Sharjah Cricket Stadium, Sharjah
Umpires: Nigel Llong (Eng) and Bismillah Jan Shinwari (Afg)
Player of the match: Brendan Taylor (Zim)

- Zimbabwe won the toss and elected to bat.
- This was Zimbabwe's biggest win, in terms of runs, against Afghanistan in ODIs.

=== 3rd ODI ===
13 February 2018
14:30 (D/N)
Scorecard

| Zimbabwe; 154 (34.3 overs) | v | Afghanistan; 158/4 (27.3 overs) |
| Craig Ervine 39 (55); Rashid Khan 5/24 (8.3 overs) | | Rahmat Shah 56 (52); Tendai Chatara 2/18 (5 overs) |

Afghanistan won by 6 wickets
Sharjah Cricket Stadium, Sharjah
Umpires: Nigel Llong (Eng) and Ahmed Shah Pakteen (Afg)
Player of the match: Rashid Khan (Afg)

- Zimbabwe won the toss and elected to bat.
- This was Afghanistan's biggest winning margin against Zimbabwe in ODIs, in terms of wickets (6).

=== 4th ODI ===
16 February 2018
14:30 (D/N)
Scorecard

| Zimbabwe; 134 (38 overs) | v | Afghanistan; 135/0 (21.1 overs) |
| Craig Ervine 54* (73); Mujeeb Ur Rahman 5/50 (10 overs) | | Mohammad Shahzad 75* (74) |

Afghanistan won by 10 wickets
Sharjah Cricket Stadium, Sharjah
Umpires: Ahmed Shah Durrani (Afg) and Nigel Llong (Eng)
Player of the match: Mujeeb Ur Rahman (Afg)

- Zimbabwe won the toss and elected to bat.
- Mujeeb Ur Rahman (Afg) took his first five-wicket haul in ODIs and became the youngest player ever to take an ODI five-wicket haul.
- This was Afghanistan's biggest winning margin against Zimbabwe in ODIs, in terms of wickets (10).

=== 5th ODI ===
19 February 2018
14:30 (D/N)
Scorecard

| Afghanistan; 241/9 (50 overs) | v | Zimbabwe; 95 (32.1 overs) |
| Javed Ahmadi 76 (87); Sikandar Raza 2/41 (10 overs) | | Craig Ervine 32 (75); Rashid Khan 3/13 (5.1 overs) |

Afghanistan won by 146 runs
Sharjah Cricket Stadium, Sharjah
Umpires: Nigel Llong (Eng) and Ahmed Shah Pakteen (Afg)
Player of the match: Sharafuddin Ashraf (Afg)

- Afghanistan won the toss and elected to bat.
- This was Zimbabwe's 500th ODI.
