= Afghan cricket team against Zimbabwe in the UAE in 2015–16 =

International cricket tour

Afghanistan vs Zimbabwe in the UAE in 2015–16
	Afghanistan	Zimbabwe
- Dates: 25 December 2015 – 10 January 2016
Captains	Asghar Stanikzai	Elton Chigumbura

One Day International series
- Results: Afghanistan won the 5-match series 3–2
Most runs	Mohammad Shahzad (237)	Hamilton Masakadza (266)
Most wickets	Amir Hamza (11)	Luke Jongwe (10)
- Player of the series: Mohammad Shahzad (Afg)

Twenty20 International series
- Results: Afghanistan won the 2-match series 2–0
Most runs	Mohammad Shahzad (151)	Hamilton Masakadza (96)
Most wickets	Dawlat Zadran (5)	Graeme Cremer (4)
- Player of the series: Mohammad Shahzad (Afg)

The Afghanistan cricket team toured the United Arab Emirates to play Zimbabwe from 25 December 2015 to 10 January 2016. The tour consisted of five One Day Internationals (ODIs) and two Twenty20 Internationals (T20Is) matches. All the matches took place at the Sharjah Cricket Association Stadium.

Afghanistan won the ODI series 3–2 and made the top ten of the ODI rankings for the first time. Afghanistan won the T20I series 2–0. Following the conclusion of the series, Afghan batsman Mohammad Shahzad entered the ICC's T20I batting rankings in eighth place. His teammate Dawlat Zadran entered the ICC's list for best bowlers in T20I cricket, also in eighth place.

== Squads ==
Afghanistan	Zimbabwe
Asghar Stanikzai (c); Yamin Ahmadzai; Mirwais Ashraf; Rokhan Barakzai; Usman Ghani; Amir Hamza; Nawaz Khan; Rashid Khan; Nawroz Mangal; Mohammad Nabi; Gulbadin Naib; Karim Sadiq; Shafiqullah; Rahmat Shah; Hashmatullah Shahidi; Mohammad Shahzad; Samiullah Shinwari; Sayed Shirzad; Dawlat Zadran; Najibullah Zadran; Noor Ali Zadran	Elton Chigumbura (c); Chamu Chibhabha; Tendai Chisoro; Graeme Cremer; Craig Ervine; Luke Jongwe; Neville Madziva; Hamilton Masakadza; Wellington Masakadza; Peter Moor; Richmond Mutumbami; Taurai Muzarabani; Tinashe Panyangara; Sikandar Raza; Malcolm Waller

== ODI series ==
=== 1st ODI ===
25 December 2015
15:00 (D/N)
Scorecard

Afghanistan; 131 (38.5 overs)	v	Zimbabwe; 82 (30.5 overs)
Noor Ali Zadran 63 (82); Graeme Cremer 5/20 (9.5 overs)		Elton Chigumbura 28 (41); Amir Hamza 4/17 (7.5 overs)

Afghanistan won by 49 runs
Sharjah Cricket Association Stadium, Sharjah
Umpires: Vineet Kulkarni (Ind) and Chettithody Shamshuddin (Ind)
Player of the match: Amir Hamza (Afg)

- Afghanistan won the toss and elected to bat.
- Yamin Ahmadzai (Afg) made his ODI debut.
- Afghanistan's total of 131 was the lowest total successfully defended by an Associate side against a Test side in an ODI match.
- With this victory Afghanistan entered the top 10 of the ICC's ODI rankings for the first time.

=== 2nd ODI ===
29 December 2015
15:00 (D/N)
Scorecard

Zimbabwe; 253/7 (50 overs)	v	Afghanistan; 254/6 (47.4 overs)
Craig Ervine 73 (98); Dawlat Zadran 3/57 (10 overs)		Mohammad Shahzad 131* (133); Elton Chigumbura 3/32 (7 overs)

Afghanistan won by 4 wickets
Sharjah Cricket Association Stadium, Sharjah
Umpires: Anil Chaudhary (Ind) and Chettithody Shamshuddin (Ind)
Player of the match: Mohammad Shahzad (Afg)

- Zimbabwe won the toss and elected to bat.
- Rokhan Barakzai (Afg) made his ODI debut.
- Mohammad Shahzad's 131 not out was the highest individual total for an Afghan batsman in an ODI match.

=== 3rd ODI ===
2 January 2016
15:00 (D/N)
Scorecard

Zimbabwe; 175 (48.3 overs)	v	Afghanistan; 58 (16.1 overs)
Hamilton Masakadza 83 (138); Mirwais Ashraf 3/20 (8 overs)		Mohammad Shahzad 31 (22); Luke Jongwe 5/6 (5.1 overs)

Zimbabwe won by 117 runs
Sharjah Cricket Association Stadium, Sharjah
Umpires: Anil Chaudhary (Ind) and Vineet Kulkarni (Ind)
Player of the match: Hamilton Masakadza (Zim)

- Zimbabwe won the toss and elected to bat.

=== 4th ODI ===
4 January 2016
15:00 (D/N)
Scorecard

Zimbabwe; 226 (49.1 overs)	v	Afghanistan; 161 (45 overs)
Chamu Chibhabha 53 (92); Rashid Khan 3/43 (10 overs)		Mohammad Shahzad 45 (72); Chamu Chibhabha 4/25 (10 overs)

Zimbabwe won by 65 runs
Sharjah Cricket Association Stadium, Sharjah
Umpires: Vineet Kulkarni (Ind) and Chettithody Shamshuddin (Ind)
Player of the match: Chamu Chibhabha (Zim)

- Zimbabwe won the toss and elected to bat.

=== 5th ODI ===
6 January 2016
15:00 (D/N)
Scorecard

Zimbabwe; 248 (49.5 overs)	v	Afghanistan; 254/8 (49.4 overs)
Hamilton Masakadza 110 (111); Amir Hamza 3/41 (9.5 overs)		Gulbadin Naib 82* (68); Luke Jongwe 3/50 (8 overs)

Afghanistan won by 2 wickets
Sharjah Cricket Association Stadium, Sharjah
Umpires: Anil Chaudhary (Ind) and Chettithody Shamshuddin (Ind)
Player of the match: Gulbadin Naib (Afg)

- Zimbabwe won the toss and elected to bat.

== T20I series ==
=== 1st T20I ===
8 January 2016
20:00 (D/N)
Scorecard

Afghanistan; 187/7 (20 overs)	v	Zimbabwe; 182/7 (20 overs)
Usman Ghani 42 (38); Graeme Cremer 3/17 (4 overs)		Malcolm Waller 49* (37); Dawlat Zadran 3/32 (4 overs)

Afghanistan won by 5 runs
Sharjah Cricket Association Stadium, Sharjah
Umpires: Anil Chaudhary (Ind) and Vineet Kulkarni (Ind)
Player of the match: Gulbadin Naib (Afg)

- Afghanistan won the toss and elected to bat.
- Peter Moor and Donald Tiripano (Zimbabwe) both made their T20I debuts.

=== 2nd T20I ===
10 January 2016
20:00 (D/N)
Scorecard

Afghanistan; 215/6 (20 overs)	v	Zimbabwe; 134 (18.1 overs)
Mohammad Shahzad 118* (67); Tendai Chisoro 1/29 (4 overs)		Hamilton Masakadza 63 (44); Amir Hamza 2/14 (3 overs)

Afghanistan won by 81 runs
Sharjah Cricket Association Stadium, Sharjah
Umpires: Vineet Kulkarni (Ind) and Chettithody Shamshuddin (Ind)
Player of the match: Mohammad Shahzad (Afg)

- Zimbabwe won the toss and elected to field.
- Mohammad Shahzad (Afg) scored the highest individual innings for an Associate team and the fourth highest innings ever in T20Is.
