= South African cricket team in the West Indies in 2024 =

International cricket tour

The South African cricket team toured the West Indies twice; first in May 2024 to play three T20I matches, and second in August 2024 to play two Tests and three T20I matches. The Test series formed part of the 2023–2025 ICC World Test Championship. The first part of the T20I series formed part of both teams' preparation ahead of the 2024 ICC Men's T20 World Cup.

== Squads ==
West Indies			South Africa		
T20Is (I)	Tests	T20Is (II)	T20Is (I)	Tests	T20Is (II)
Brandon King (c); Roston Chase (vc); Fabian Allen; Alick Athanaze; Johnson Charles (wk); Andre Fletcher (wk); Matthew Forde; Jason Holder; Akeal Hosein; Shamar Joseph; Kyle Mayers; Obed McCoy; Gudakesh Motie; Romario Shepherd; Hayden Walsh Jr.	Kraigg Brathwaite (c); Joshua Da Silva (vc, wk); Alick Athanaze; Keacy Carty; Bryan Charles; Justin Greaves; Jason Holder; Kavem Hodge; Tevin Imlach (wk); Shamar Joseph; Mikyle Louis; Gudakesh Motie; Kemar Roach; Jayden Seales; Jomel Warrican	Rovman Powell (c); Roston Chase (vc); Fabian Allen; Alick Athanaze; Johnson Charles (wk); Matthew Forde; Shimron Hetmyer; Shai Hope (wk); Akeal Hosein; Shamar Joseph; Obed McCoy; Gudakesh Motie; Nicholas Pooran (wk); Sherfane Rutherford; Romario Shepherd	Rassie van der Dussen (c); Ottniel Baartman; Matthew Breetzke; Gerald Coetzee; Quinton de Kock (wk); Bjorn Fortuin; Reeza Hendricks; Patrick Kruger; Wiaan Mulder; Lungi Ngidi; Anrich Nortje; Nqaba Peter; Andile Phehlukwayo; Ryan Rickelton (wk); Tabraiz Shamsi	Temba Bavuma (c); David Bedingham; Matthew Breetzke; Nandre Burger; ~~Gerald Coetzee~~; Tony de Zorzi; Keshav Maharaj; Aiden Markram; Wiaan Mulder; Lungi Ngidi; Dane Paterson; Dane Piedt; Migael Pretorius; Kagiso Rabada; Tristan Stubbs (wk); Ryan Rickelton (wk); Kyle Verreynne (wk)	Aiden Markram (c); Ottniel Baartman; Nandre Burger; Donovan Ferreira; Bjorn Fortuin; Reeza Hendricks; Patrick Kruger; Kwena Maphaka; Wiaan Mulder; ~~Lungi Ngidi~~; Ryan Rickelton (wk); Jason Smith; Tristan Stubbs (wk); Rassie van der Dussen; Lizaad Williams

On 25 July 2024, Gerald Coetzee was ruled out of the Test series with a side-strain on his left side, Migael Pretorius was named as his replacement. On 23 August 2024, Lungi Ngidi was ruled out of the second T20I series with a right calf injury.

== T20I series (May 2024) ==
South African cricket team in the West Indies in 2024
	West Indies	South Africa
- Dates: 23 – 26 May 2024
Captains	Brandon King	Rassie van der Dussen

Twenty20 International series
- Results: West Indies won the 3-match series 3–0
Most runs	Brandon King (159)	Reeza Hendricks (127)
Most wickets	Gudakesh Motie (8)	Andile Phehlukwayo (5)
- Player of the series: Gudakesh Motie (WI)

=== 1st T20I ===
23 May 2024
14:00
Scorecard

West Indies; 175/8 (20 overs)	v	South Africa; 147 (19.5 overs)
Brandon King 79 (45); Ottniel Baartman 3/26 (4 overs)		Reeza Hendricks 87 (51); Gudakesh Motie 3/25 (4 overs)

West Indies won by 28 runs
Sabina Park, Kingston
Umpires: Gregory Brathwaite (WI) and Joel Wilson (WI)
Player of the match: Brandon King (WI)

- South Africa won the toss and elected to field.
- Shamar Joseph (WI), Ottniel Baartman and Ryan Rickelton (SA) all made their T20I debut.

=== 2nd T20I ===
25 May 2024
14:00
Scorecard

West Indies; 207/7 (20 overs)	v	South Africa; 191/7 (20 overs)
Roston Chase 67* (38); Nqaba Peter 2/32 (4 overs)		Quinton de Kock 41 (17); Gudakesh Motie 3/22 (4 overs)

West Indies won by 16 runs
Sabina Park, Kingston
Umpires: Nigel Duguid (WI) and Joel Wilson (WI)
Player of the match: Roston Chase (WI)

- West Indies won the toss and elected to bat.
- Nqaba Peter (SA) made his T20I debut.

=== 3rd T20I ===
26 May 2024
14:00
Scorecard

South Africa; 163/7 (20 overs)	v	West Indies; 165/2 (13.5 overs)
Rassie van der Dussen 51 (31); Obed McCoy 3/39 (4 overs)		Johnson Charles 69 (26); Nqaba Peter 1/27 (2 overs)

West Indies won by 8 wickets
Sabina Park, Kingston
Umpires: Patrick Gustard (WI) and Leslie Reifer (WI)
Player of the match: Johnson Charles (WI)

- South Africa won the toss and elected to bat.
- Alick Athanaze (WI) and Patrick Kruger (SA) both made their T20I debut.

== Tour match ==
=== 4-day warm-up match ===
31 July – 3 August 2024
Scorecard

West Indies Championship XI (Cricket West Indies)	v	South Africa
397 (117.3 overs); Shamar Springer 131 (212); Dane Piedt 3/41 (16.3 overs)		408/9d (119 overs); Aiden Markram 82* (107); Shamar Springer 1/13 (6 overs)
46/4 (27 overs); Tagenarine Chanderpaul 14 (51); Lungi Ngidi 3/8 (4 overs)

Match drawn
Brian Lara Cricket Academy, San Fernando
Umpires: Zahid Bassarath (WI) and Deighton Butler (WI)

- South Africa won the toss and elected to field.

== Test series ==
South African cricket team in the West Indies in 2024
	West Indies	South Africa
- Dates: 7 – 19 August 2024
Captains	Kraigg Brathwaite	Temba Bavuma

Test series
- Result: South Africa won the 2-match series 1–0
Most runs	Jason Holder (121)	Tony de Zorzi (163)
Most wickets	Jayden Seales (12)	Keshav Maharaj (13)
- Player of the series: Keshav Maharaj (SA)

=== 1st Test ===
7–11 August 2024
Scorecard

South Africa	v	West Indies
357 (117.4 overs); Temba Bavuma 86 (182); Jomel Warrican 4/69 (22 overs)		233 (91.5 overs); Keacy Carty 42 (81); Keshav Maharaj 4/76 (40 overs)
173/3d (29 overs); Tristan Stubbs 68 (50); Jomel Warrican 2/57 (9 overs)		201/5 (56.2 overs); Alick Athanaze 92 (116); Keshav Maharaj 4/88 (26.2 overs)

Match drawn
Queen's Park Oval, Port of Spain
Umpires: Richard Illingworth (Eng) and Ahsan Raza (Pak)
Player of the match: Keshav Maharaj (SA)

- South Africa won the toss and elected to bat.
- Keacy Carty (WI) made his Test debut.
- World Test Championship points: South Africa 4, West Indies 4.

=== 2nd Test ===
15–17 August 2024
Scorecard

South Africa	v	West Indies
160 (54 overs); Dane Piedt 38* (60); Shamar Joseph 5/33 (14 overs)		144 (42.4 overs); Jason Holder 54* (88); Wiaan Mulder 4/32 (9 overs)
246 (80.4 overs); Kyle Verreynne 59 (78); Jayden Seales 6/61 (18.4 overs)		222 (66.2 overs); Gudakesh Motie 45 (59); Keshav Maharaj 3/37 (11.2 overs)

South Africa won by 40 runs
Providence Stadium, Georgetown
Umpires: Ahsan Raza (Pak) and Sharfuddoula (Ban)
Player of the match: Wiaan Mulder (SA)

- South Africa won the toss and elected to bat.
- World Test Championship points: South Africa 12, West Indies 0

== T20I series (August 2024) ==
South African cricket team in the West Indies in 2024
	West Indies	South Africa
- Dates: 23 – 27 August 2024
Captains	Rovman Powell (Note: Roston Chase captained West Indies in the 3rd T20I.)	Aiden Markram

Twenty20 International series
- Results: West Indies won the 3-match series 3–0
Most runs	Shai Hope (134)	Tristan Stubbs (144)
Most wickets	Romario Shepherd (6)	Ottniel Baartman (4)
- Player of the series: Shai Hope (WI)

=== 1st T20I ===
23 August 2024
15:00
Scorecard

South Africa; 174/7 (20 overs)	v	West Indies; 176/3 (17.5 overs)
Tristan Stubbs 76 (42); Matthew Forde 3/27 (4 overs)		Nicholas Pooran 65* (26); Ottneil Baartman 2/30 (4 overs)

West Indies won by 7 wickets
Brian Lara Cricket Academy, San Fernando
Umpires: Gregory Brathwaite (WI) and Patrick Gustard (WI)
Player of the match: Nicholas Pooran (WI)

- West Indies won the toss and elected to field.
- Kwena Maphaka (SA) made his T20I debut.

=== 2nd T20I ===
25 August 2024
15:00
Scorecard

West Indies; 179/6 (20 overs)	v	South Africa; 149 (20 overs)
Shai Hope 41 (22); Lizaad Williams 3/36 (4 overs)		Reeza Hendricks 44 (18); Romario Shepherd 3/15 (4 overs)

West Indies won by 30 runs
Brian Lara Cricket Academy, San Fernando
Umpires: Nigel Duguid (WI) and Leslie Reifer (WI)
Player of the match: Romario Shepherd (WI)

- South Africa won the toss and elected to field.

=== 3rd T20I ===
27 August 2024
15:00
Scorecard

South Africa; 108/4 (13 overs)	v	West Indies; 116/2 (9.2 overs)
Tristan Stubbs 40 (15); Romario Shepherd 2/14 (2 overs)		Shai Hope 42* (24); Bjorn Fortuin 1/8 (1 over)

West Indies won by 8 wickets (DLS method)
Brian Lara Cricket Academy, San Fernando
Umpires: Gregory Brathwaite (WI) and Leslie Reifer (WI)
Player of the match: Romario Shepherd (WI)

- West Indies won the toss and elected to field.
- The match was reduced to 13 overs per side due to rain.
- Jason Smith (SA) made his T20I debut.
- West Indies were set a revised target of 116 runs from 13 overs due to rain.
