= Bangladeshi cricket team against Afghanistan in the UAE in 2024–25 =

International cricket tour

	Afghanistan	Bangladesh
- Dates: 6 – 11 November 2024
Captains	Hashmatullah Shahidi	Najmul Hossain Shanto (Note: Mehidy Hasan Miraz captained Bangladesh in the third ODI.)

One Day International series
- Results: Afghanistan won the 3-match series 2–1
Most runs	Mohammad Nabi (135)	Najmul Hossain Shanto (123)
Most wickets	Allah Mohammad Ghazanfar (8)	Mustafizur Rahman (8)
- Player of the series: Mohammad Nabi (Afg)

The Bangladesh cricket team toured the United Arab Emirates in November 2024 to play three One Day International (ODI) matches against Afghanistan cricket team. In September 2024, Afghanistan Cricket Board (ACB) confirmed the fixtures for the tour. The series formed part of both teams' preparations for the upcoming ICC Champions Trophy which is set to take place in February 2025.

Originally, the series was scheduled to played in July 2024 with two Tests, three ODIs and three T20Is. Later it was rescheduled to played in Greater Noida between July 25 and August 6 with three ODIs and three T20Is. However, it was postponed due to weather conditions that suggested rain during that point of time in Greater Noida.

== Squads ==
Afghanistan	Bangladesh
Hashmatullah Shahidi (c); Rahmat Shah (vc); Fareed Ahmad; Ikram Alikhil (wk); Noor Ahmad; Sediqullah Atal; Fazalhaq Farooqi; Allah Mohammad Ghazanfar; Rahmanullah Gurbaz (wk); Riaz Hassan; Rashid Khan; Nangialai Kharoti; Abdul Malik; Mohammad Nabi; Gulbadin Naib; Azmatullah Omarzai; Darwish Rasooli; Bilal Sami; Naveed Zadran	Najmul Hossain Shanto (c); Mehidy Hasan Miraz (vc); Nasum Ahmed; Taskin Ahmed; Jaker Ali (wk); Tanzid Hasan; Zakir Hasan (wk); Rishad Hossain; Towhid Hridoy; Shoriful Islam; Mahmudullah; Mushfiqur Rahim (wk); Mustafizur Rahman; Nahid Rana; Soumya Sarkar

Bangladesh named uncapped pacer Nahid Rana and wicket-keeper Jaker Ali in the squad. Zakir Hasan and Nasum Ahmed returned to the squad after a year. On 7 November, Mushfiqur Rahim was ruled out of the remaining ODIs due to a finger fracture. On 11 November, captain Najmul Hossain Shanto was ruled out of the third and final ODI match due to a groin injury, with Mehidy Hasan Miraz named as captain.

== ODI series ==
=== 1st ODI ===
6 November 2024
14:00 (D/N)
Scorecard

Afghanistan; 235 (49.4 overs)	v	Bangladesh; 143 (34.3 overs)
Mohammad Nabi 84 (79); Taskin Ahmed 4/53 (10 overs)		Najmul Hossain Shanto 47 (68); Allah Mohammad Ghazanfar 6/26 (6.3 overs)

Afghanistan won by 92 runs
Sharjah Cricket Stadium, Sharjah
Umpires: Ahmed Shah Durrani (Afg) and Alex Wharf (Eng)
Player of the match: Allah Mohammad Ghazanfar (Afg)

- Afghanistan won the toss and elected to bat.
- This was the 300th men's international match to be hosted at this venue.
- Sediqullah Atal (Afg) made his ODI debut.
- Allah Mohammad Ghazanfar (Afg) took his first five-wicket haul in ODIs.

=== 2nd ODI ===
9 November 2024
14:00 (D/N)
Scorecard

Bangladesh; 252/7 (50 overs)	v	Afghanistan; 184 (43.3 overs)
Najmul Hossain Shanto 76 (119); Nangialai Kharoti 3/28 (8 overs)		Rahmat Shah 52 (76); Nasum Ahmed 3/28 (8.3 overs)

Bangladesh won by 68 runs
Sharjah Cricket Stadium, Sharjah
Umpires: Ahsan Raza (Pak) and Bismillah Jan Shinwari (Afg)
Player of the match: Najmul Hossain Shanto (Ban)

- Bangladesh won the toss and elected to bat.
- Jaker Ali (Ban) made his ODI debut.

=== 3rd ODI ===
11 November 2024
14:00 (D/N)
Scorecard

Bangladesh; 244/8 (50 overs)	v	Afghanistan; 246/5 (48.2 overs)
Mahmudullah 98 (98); Azmatullah Omarzai 4/37 (7 overs)		Rahmanullah Gurbaz 101 (120); Nahid Rana 2/40 (10 overs)

Afghanistan won by 5 wickets
Sharjah Cricket Stadium, Sharjah
Umpires: Izatullah Safi (Afg) and Alex Wharf (Eng)
Player of the match: Azmatullah Omarzai (Afg)

- Bangladesh won the toss and elected to bat.
- Nahid Rana (Ban) made his ODI debut.
- Mehidy Hasan Miraz captained Bangladesh for the first time in ODIs and played in his 100th ODI match.
