= Blessing Muzarabani =

Zimbabwean cricketer

Personal information
- Born: 2 October 1996 (age 30); Murewa, Zimbabwe
- Height: 6 ft 8 in (203 cm)
- Batting: Right-handed
- Bowling: Right-arm fast-medium
- Role: Bowler

International information
- National side: Zimbabwe (2017–present)
- Test debut (cap 105): 26 December 2017 v South Africa
- Last Test: 20 October 2025 v Afghanistan
- ODI debut (cap 134): 15 January 2018 v Bangladesh
- Last ODI: 31 August 2025 v Sri Lanka
- ODI shirt no.: 40
- T20I debut (cap 48): 5 February 2018 v Afghanistan
- Last T20I: 25 July 2026 v India
- T20I shirt no.: 40

Domestic team information
- Years: Team
- 2017–2018: Rising Stars
- 2019–2020: Northamptonshire
- 2019–present: Mashonaland Eagles
- 2021–2022: Multan Sultans
- 2024: Karachi Kings
- 2025: Royal Challengers Bengaluru
- 2026–present: Kolkata Knight Riders

Career statistics
Competition	Test	ODI	T20I	FC
Matches	18	57	88	37
Runs scored	288	134	50	561
Batting average	12.52	5.15	2.94	13.04
100s/50s	0/0	0/0	0/0	0/1
Top score	47	17*	9*	52*
Balls bowled	3,161	2,717	1,852	5,418
Wickets	67	70	105	120
Bowling average	26.20	33.35	21.24	24.84
5 wickets in innings	3	1	0	4
10 wickets in match	0	0	0	0
Best bowling	7/58	5/49	4/17	7/58
Catches/stumpings	2/–	14/–	14/–	10/–
- Source: Cricinfo, 26 February 2026

Blessing Muzarabani (born 2 October 1996) is a Zimbabwean cricketer. He made his first-class debut for Rising Stars in the 2017–18 Logan Cup on 4 October 2017.

== Early life ==
Blessing was born in Murewa, a small town in Zimbabwe. Later his family moved to Highfield, a suburb in Harare. At the age of seven, he started cricket training at Takashinga Cricket Club. This is where his talent was spotted by coaches. In 2017, he was chosen by Tatenda Taibu for the Rising Stars Academy to tour England for three months.

== Domestic career ==
In December 2020, he was selected to play for the Southern Rocks in the 2020–21 Logan Cup.

In June 2021, Multan Sultans in the Pakistan Super League (PSL) added Muzarabani to their squad, replacing Obed McCoy, for the remaining matches in the 2021 PSL edition. He played six matches and took ten wickets for his team, with the Multan Sultans winning their first PSL title.

Kolkata Knight Riders bought him as a replacement for Mustafizur Rahman after he was pulled out due to political reasons

== International career ==
In December 2017, he was named in Zimbabwe's Test squad for their one-off Test against South Africa. He made his Test debut for Zimbabwe against South Africa in the Boxing Day Test on 26 December 2017.

In January 2018, he was named in Zimbabwe's One Day International (ODI) squad for the tri-series in Bangladesh. He made his ODI debut for Zimbabwe against Bangladesh on 15 January 2018.

In February 2018, he was named in Zimbabwe's Twenty20 International (T20I) squad for their series against Afghanistan in the UAE. He made his T20I debut for Zimbabwe against Afghanistan on 5 February 2018.

Following the conclusion of the 2018 Cricket World Cup Qualifier tournament, the International Cricket Council (ICC) named Muzarabani as the rising star of Zimbabwe's squad.

In August 2018, Muzarabani made himself unavailable for national selection for Zimbabwe, instead wishing to further his career in England. The following month, he signed a three-year deal with the English side Northamptonshire as a Kolpak player.

He then returned to play for Zimbabwe after his time in County Cricket. On 3 November 2020, in the third match against Pakistan, Muzarabani took his first five-wicket haul in ODI cricket and he took two additional wickets in the super over of the same match.

On 13 February 2026, Muzarabani produced a match-winning spell of 4/17 against Australia in T20 World Cup to help Zimbabwe register a historic 23-run victory. During his spell, he became the third bowler from Zimbabwe after Richard Ngarava and Sikandar Raza to complete 100 T20I wickets.
