= South African cricket team against Afghanistan in the UAE in 2024–25 =

International cricket tour

	Afghanistan	South Africa
- Dates: 18 – 22 September 2024
Captains	Hashmatullah Shahidi	Temba Bavuma (Note: Aiden Markram captained South Africa in the first ODI.)

One Day International series
- Results: Afghanistan won the 3-match series 2–1
Most runs	Rahmanullah Gurbaz (194)	Aiden Markram (92)
Most wickets	Rashid Khan (7)	Lungi Ngidi (4)
- Player of the series: Rahmanullah Gurbaz (Afg)

The South Africa cricket team toured the United Arab Emirates in September 2024 to play three One Day International (ODI) matches against Afghanistan cricket team. In July 2024, Afghanistan Cricket Board (ACB) confirmed the fixtures for the tour. All the matches were played at the Sharjah Cricket Stadium. It was the first bilateral ODI series between the two teams.

Afghanistan won the first ODI by six wickets, their first ever ODI victory over South Africa. The hosts won the second ODI by 177 runs, with Rahmanullah Gurbaz scoring 105 and Rashid Khan's five-wicket haul of 5/19, to secure their first series victory over South Africa. South Africa won the third ODI by 7 wickets, with Aiden Markram scoring an unbeaten 69.

== Squads ==
Afghanistan	South Africa
Hashmatullah Shahidi (c); Rahmat Shah (vc); Fareed Ahmad; Ikram Alikhil (wk); Fazalhaq Farooqi; Allah Mohammad Ghazanfar; Rahmanullah Gurbaz (wk); Riaz Hassan; Rashid Khan; Nangialai Kharoti; Abdul Malik; Mohammad Nabi; Gulbadin Naib; Azmatullah Omarzai; Darwish Rasooli; Bilal Sami; Naveed Zadran	Temba Bavuma (c); Ottniel Baartman; Nandre Burger; Bjorn Fortuin; Tony de Zorzi; Reeza Hendricks; Aiden Markram; Wiaan Mulder; Lungi Ngidi; Nqaba Peter; Andile Phehlukwayo; Andile Simelane; Jason Smith; Tristan Stubbs (wk); Kyle Verreynne (wk); Lizaad Williams

On 17 September 2024, Temba Bavuma was ruled out of the first ODI due to illness, and Aiden Markram was named as the captain.

== ODI series ==
=== 1st ODI ===
18 September 2024
16:00 (D/N)
Scorecard

South Africa; 106 (33.3 overs)	v	Afghanistan; 107/4 (26 overs)
Wiaan Mulder 52 (84); Fazalhaq Farooqi 4/35 (7 overs)		Gulbadin Naib 34* (27); Bjorn Fortuin 2/22 (9 overs)

Afghanistan won by 6 wickets
Sharjah Cricket Stadium, Sharjah
Umpires: Langton Rusere (Zim) and Izatullah Safi (Afg)
Player of the match: Fazalhaq Farooqi (Afg)

- South Africa won the toss and elected to bat.
- Jason Smith (SA) made his ODI debut.
- This was Afghanistan's first win against South Africa in ODIs.

=== 2nd ODI ===
20 September 2024
16:00 (D/N)
Scorecard

Afghanistan; 311/4 (50 overs)	v	South Africa; 134 (34.2 overs)
Rahmanullah Gurbaz 105 (110); Aiden Markram 1/20 (4 overs)		Temba Bavuma 38 (47); Rashid Khan 5/19 (9 overs)

Afghanistan won by 177 runs
Sharjah Cricket Stadium, Sharjah
Umpires: Ahmed Shah Durrani (Afg) and Ahmed Shah Pakteen (Afg)
Player of the match: Rashid Khan (Afg)

- Afghanistan won the toss and elected to bat.
- Nqaba Peter (SA) made his ODI debut.

=== 3rd ODI ===
22 September 2024
16:00 (D/N)
Scorecard

Afghanistan; 169 (34 overs)	v	South Africa; 170/3 (33 overs)
Rahmanullah Gurbaz 89 (94); Andile Phehlukwayo 2/17 (4 overs)		Aiden Markram 69* (67); Fareed Ahmad 1/17 (7 overs)

South Africa won by 7 wickets
Sharjah Cricket Stadium, Sharjah
Umpires: Langton Rusere (Zim) and Izatullah Safi (Afg)
Player of the match: Rahmanullah Gurbaz (Afg)

- Afghanistan won the toss and elected to bat.
- Abdul Malik (Afg) made his ODI debut.
