= Nqaba Peter =

South African cricketer (born 2001)

Personal information
- Full name: Nqabayomzi Xolela Peter
- Born: 9 December 2001 (age 24); East London, Eastern Cape, South Africa
- Batting: Right-handed
- Bowling: Right-arm leg break
- Role: Bowler

International information
- National side: South Africa (2024–present)
- ODI debut (cap 151): 20 September 2024 v Afghanistan
- Last ODI: 8 November 2025 v Pakistan
- T20I debut (cap 104): 25 May 2024 v West Indies
- Last T20I: 12 August 2025 v Australia

Domestic team information
- Years: Team
- 2020/21–2022/23: Border
- 2023/24–: Gauteng
- 2023/24–: Paarl Royals

Career statistics
Competition	ODI	T20I	FC	LA
Matches	4	12	5	23
Runs scored	21	29	89	43
Batting average	10.50	14.50	44.50	8.60
100s/50s	0/0	0/0	0/1	0/0
Top score	16	10*	81	16
Balls bowled	162	210	396	988
Wickets	6	9	8	23
Bowling average	27.16	36.00	29.37	44.13
5 wickets in innings	0	0	0	0
10 wickets in match	0	0	0	0
Best bowling	3/55	2/32	2/19	4/48
Catches/stumpings	3/–	2/–	4/–	10/–
- Source: Cricinfo, 5 March 2026

Nqabayomzi Xolela Peter (born 9 December 2001) is a South African cricketer who plays for the South Africa national cricket team. He plays domestically for Gauteng and Paarl Royals as a leg break bowler.

== Domestic career ==
He made his Twenty20 debut for Border against Limpopo in the CSA Provincial T20 Cup on 4 October 2021. He made his List A debut for Lions against Western Province in the CSA One-Day Cup on 23 September 2023. He made his first-class debut for Lions against Boland in the 2024–25 CSA 4-Day Series on 20 March 2025.

== International career ==
In May 2024 he was earned maiden call-up for national team for the T20I series against West Indies. He made his Twenty20 International (T20I) debut in the second T20I of the same series on 25 May 2024. He took two wickets on his T20I debut. In September 2024 he was named in One Day squad for the series against Afghanistan and against Ireland. He made his One Day International (ODI) debut against Afghanistan, on 20 September 2024.

== Awards ==
In September 2024, Peter was named the men's domestic newcomer of the season and T20 Challenge player of the season at the annual awards.
