= Irish cricket team against Afghanistan in the UAE in 2017–18 =

International cricket tour

Irish cricket team against Afghanistan in 2017–18
	Afghanistan	Ireland
- Dates: 5 – 10 December 2017
Captains	Asghar Stanikzai	William Porterfield

One Day International series
- Results: Ireland won the 3-match series 2–1
Most runs	Rahmat Shah (126)	Paul Stirling (188)
Most wickets	Rashid Khan (7); Mujeeb Ur Rahman (7)	Barry McCarthy (8)
- Player of the series: Paul Stirling (Ire)

The Ireland cricket team toured the United Arab Emirates in December 2017 to play three One Day Internationals (ODIs) against the Afghanistan cricket team. The matches were used as a warm-up for the 2018 Cricket World Cup Qualifier, which took place in Zimbabwe in March 2018. Ireland won the series 2–1.

== Squads ==
Afghanistan	Ireland
Asghar Stanikzai (c); Javed Ahmadi; Amir Hamza; Ihsanullah; Nasir Jamal; Rashid Khan; Zahir Khan; Mohammad Nabi; Gulbadin Naib; Shafiqullah; Rahmat Shah; Dawlat Zadran; Mujeeb Zadran; Najibullah Zadran; Noor Ali Zadran; Shapoor Zadran	William Porterfield (c); John Anderson; Andrew Balbirnie; Peter Chase; George Dockrell; ~~Ed Joyce~~; Barry McCarthy; Jacob Mulder; Tim Murtagh; Kevin O'Brien; Niall O'Brien; Stuart Poynter; Boyd Rankin; Simi Singh; Paul Stirling; Gary Wilson

Ahead of the series, Ed Joyce was ruled out of Ireland's squad with a knee injury, with John Anderson replacing him. Niall O'Brien initially returned home to Ireland for personal reasons and was replaced by Stuart Poynter, but he re-joined the squad prior to the series.

== ODI series ==
=== 1st ODI ===
5 December 2017
14:30 (D/N)
Scorecard

Afghanistan; 238/9 (50 overs)	v	Ireland; 100 (31.4 overs)
Nasir Jamal 53 (63); Boyd Rankin 4/44 (10 overs)		William Porterfield 35 (63); Mujeeb Ur Rahman 4/24 (10 overs)

Afghanistan won by 138 runs
Sharjah Cricket Stadium, Sharjah
Umpires: Ahmed Shah Pakteen (Afg) and Ruchira Palliyaguruge (SL)
Player of the match: Mujeeb Ur Rahman (Afg)

- Ireland won the toss and elected to field.
- Mujeeb Ur Rahman (Afg) made his ODI debut and became the first male to play international cricket who was born in the 21st century.
- Kevin O'Brien became the first player for Ireland to take 100 wickets in ODIs.
- Mujeeb Ur Rahman took the joint-best figures for an Afghan bowler on debut in ODIs.

=== 2nd ODI ===
7 December 2017
14:30 (D/N)
Scorecard

Ireland; 271/9 (50 overs)	v	Afghanistan; 220 (45.2 overs)
Paul Stirling 82 (96); Rashid Khan 2/40 (10 overs)		Javed Ahmadi 48 (67); Barry McCarthy 5/46 (9 overs)

Ireland won by 51 runs
Sharjah Cricket Stadium, Sharjah
Umpires: Ruchira Palliyaguruge (SL) and Izatullah Safi (Afg)
Player of the match: Barry McCarthy (Ire)

- Ireland won the toss and elected to bat.
- Barry McCarthy (Ire) took his first five-wicket haul in ODIs.

=== 3rd ODI ===
10 December 2017
14:30 (D/N)
Scorecard

Afghanistan; 177 (48.2 overs)	v	Ireland; 180/5 (38 overs)
Rashid Khan 44 (55); George Dockrell 4/28 (9 overs)		Paul Stirling 101 (97); Rashid Khan 2/17 (9 overs)

Ireland won by 5 wickets
Sharjah Cricket Stadium, Sharjah
Umpires: Ahmed Shah Pakteen (Afg) and Ruchira Palliyaguruge (SL)
Player of the match: Paul Stirling (Ire)

- Afghanistan won the toss and elected to bat.
