= Rokhan Barakzai =

Afghan cricketer (born 1989)

Personal information
- Full name: Rokhan Barakzai
- Born: 1 January 1989 (age 37); Ningarhar, Afghanistan
- Batting: Left-handed
- Bowling: Slow left-arm orthodox
- Role: Bowler

International information
- National side: Afghanistan (2015)
- Only ODI (cap 38): 29 December 2015 v Zimbabwe
- ODI shirt no.: 6
- T20I debut (cap 30): 28 November 2015 v Hong Kong
- Last T20I: 30 November 2015 v Oman

Domestic team information
- Years: Team
- 2017: Boost Region

Career statistics
Competition	ODI	T20I
Matches	1	3
Runs scored	0	0
Batting average	0	0
100s/50s	0/0	0/0
Top score	0	0
Balls bowled	60	60
Wickets	2	6
Bowling average	22.50	12.50
5 wickets in innings	0	0
10 wickets in match	0	0
Best bowling	2/45	2/21
Catches/stumpings	1/–	0/–
- Source: ESPNcricinfo, 19 August 2016

Rokhan Barakzai or Rokan Barekzai (born 1 January 1989) is an Afghan cricketer. His Twenty20 International (T20I) debut was against Hong Kong, and his One Day International (ODI) debut against Zimbabwe, in November 2015, and December 2015, respectively. Barekzai was named as the best bowler of the 2014 Shpageeza T20 Cricket Tournament. He made his first-class debut for Band-e-Amir Region in the 2017–18 Ahmad Shah Abdali 4-day Tournament on 20 October 2017.
