= Rahmanullah Gurbaz =

Afghan cricketer (born 2001)

Personal information
- Born: 28 November 2001 (age 24); Khost, Afghanistan
- Batting: Right-handed
- Role: Wicket-keeper-batter

International information
- National side: Afghanistan (2019–present)
- Test debut (cap 32): 28 February 2024 v Ireland
- Last Test: 6 June 2026 v India
- ODI debut (cap 50): 21 January 2021 v Ireland
- Last ODI: 21 October 2026 v Bangladesh
- ODI shirt no.: 21
- T20I debut (cap 38): 14 September 2019 v Zimbabwe
- Last T20I: 17 September 2026 v India
- T20I shirt no.: 21

Domestic team information
- Years: Team
- 2017: Boost Region
- 2017/18–2019/20: Mis Ainak Region
- 2018: Paktia Panthers
- 2018/19–present: Kabul Region
- 2019/20: Khulna Tigers
- 2020: Kandy Tuskers
- 2021: Kathmandu Kings XI
- 2021: Multan Sultans
- 2021–2023: Jaffna Kings
- 2022–2023: Islamabad United
- 2022: Guyana Amazon Warriors
- 2023–present: Rangpur Riders
- 2023–2025: Kolkata Knight Riders
- 2025-2026: Dhaka Capitals

Career statistics
Competition	Test	ODI	T20I	FC
Matches	3	61	90	15
Runs scored	133	2,196	2,295	1,074
Batting average	22.16	36.60	25.50	42.96
100s/50s	0/0	9/8	1/13	1/7
Top score	46	151	100	153
Catches/stumpings	3/0	35/4	52/4	19/5
- Source: cricinfo, 23 October 2026

Rahmanullah Gurbaz (Pashto: رحمان الله ګربز; born 28 November 2001) is an Afghan cricketer. He made his international debut for Afghanistan in September 2019. His parents hail from the Gurbaz tribe of Afghanistan. In January 2021, he became the first batsman for Afghanistan to score a century on debut in a One Day International (ODI), against Ireland.

== Early life ==
Gurbaz was born on 28 November 2001, in Khost, Afghanistan. Amid the challenges of growing up in a rural and tumultuous area, Gurbaz found solace in cricket, playing with improvised equipment. His father, a school principal, encouraged him to pursue a career in medicine. However, Gurbaz was irresistibly drawn to cricket, a path informally supported by his friends who recognized his natural talent. His friend Mohammad Qadir provided transportation and even invested in cricket equipment for Gurbaz, while another friend, Hedayatullah, shared his own cricket bat.

Gurbaz's cricketing pursuits were not initially well-received within his family. After discovering his commitment to the sport, his brother Afsar Ali Saadat Gurbaz reacted strongly by burning his cricket bat. Despite this setback, support from his friends allowed him to continue playing. His skills eventually caught the attention of Mohammad Khan Zadran, a former cricketer and coach, during a match where Gurbaz scored a half-century. Impressed by his potential, Zadran invited Gurbaz to join an academy and offered to guide his advancement in cricket. His younger brother Masood Gurbaz is also a cricketer and so is his brother Khalil Gurbaz.

== Domestic and T20 career ==
Gurbaz made his List A debut for Afghanistan A against Zimbabwe A during their tour to Zimbabwe on 27 January 2017. He made his Twenty20 debut for Mis Ainak Knights in the 2017 Shpageeza Cricket League on 12 September 2017. He made his first-class debut for Mis Ainak Region in the 2018 Ahmad Shah Abdali 4-day Tournament on 1 March 2018.

In September 2018, Gurbaz was named in Paktia's squad in the first edition of the Afghanistan Premier League tournament. In November 2019, he was selected to play for the Khulna Tigers in the 2019–20 Bangladesh Premier League. In July 2020, he was named in the Barbados Tridents squad for the 2020 Caribbean Premier League.

In April 2021, Gurbaz was signed by Multan Sultans to play in the rescheduled matches in the 2021 Pakistan Super League. In November 2021, he was selected to play for the Jaffna Kings following the players' draft for the 2021 Lanka Premier League. In December 2021, he was signed by Islamabad United following the players' draft for the 2022 Pakistan Super League.

In March 2022, Gurbaz was named as Jason Roy's replacement in the Gujarat Titans squad for the 2022 Indian Premier League. In July 2022, he was signed by the Jaffna Kings for the third edition of the Lanka Premier League. He was traded to Kolkata Knight Riders ahead of the IPL 2023 and represented the now three time, then two time IPL Champions. He made his debut against Punjab Kings. He played a crucial role and helped Kolkata Knight Riders win their third IPL championship.

== International career ==
In December 2017, Gurbaz was named in Afghanistan's squad for the 2018 Under-19 Cricket World Cup.

In October 2019, Gurbaz was the leading run-scorer for Afghanistan in the 2018 ACC Under-19 Asia Cup, with 117 runs in four matches. In December 2018, he was named in Afghanistan's under-23 team for the 2018 ACC Emerging Teams Asia Cup.

In August 2019, Gurbaz was named in Afghanistan's Twenty20 International (T20I) squad for the 2019–20 Bangladesh Tri-Nation Series. He made his T20I debut for Afghanistan, against Zimbabwe, on 14 September 2019.

In January 2021, Gurbaz was named in Afghanistan's One Day International (ODI) squad for their series against Ireland. He made his ODI debut for Afghanistan, against Ireland, on 21 January 2021, scoring 127 runs, becoming the first Afghan player to score a century on ODI debut and 16th overall.

In September 2021, he was named in Afghanistan's squad for the 2021 ICC Men's T20 World Cup. In September 2023, he was named in Afghanistan's squad for the 2023 Cricket World Cup. In May 2024, he was named in Afghanistan's squad for the 2024 ICC Men's T20 World Cup tournament.

== International centuries ==
One Day International centuries by Rahmanullah Gurbaz
No.	Runs	Against	Venue	H/A/N	Date	Result	Ref
1	127	Ireland	Sheikh Zayed Stadium, Abu Dhabi	Neutral	21 January 2021	Won	
2	103	Netherlands	West End Park International Cricket Stadium, Doha	Neutral	23 January 2022	Won	
3	106 not out	Bangladesh	Zohur Ahmed Chowdhury Stadium, Chittagong	Away	28 February 2022	Won	
4	145	Bangladesh	Zohur Ahmed Chowdhury Stadium, Chittagong	Away	8 July 2023	Won	
5	151	Pakistan	Mahinda Rajapaksa International Cricket Stadium, Hambantota	Neutral	24 August 2023	Lost	
6	121	Ireland	Sharjah Cricket Stadium, Sharjah	Neutral	7 March 2024	Won	
7	105	South Africa	Sharjah Cricket Stadium, Sharjah	Neutral	20 September 2024	Won	
8	101	Bangladesh	Sharjah Cricket Stadium, Sharjah	Neutral	11 November 2024	Won	
9	102	India	Himachal Pradesh Cricket Association Stadium, Dharamshala	Away	13 June 2026	Lost	

Twenty20 International centuries by Rahmanullah Gurbaz
No.	Runs	Against	Venue	H/A/N	Date	Result	Ref
1	100	United Arab Emirates	Sharjah Cricket Stadium, Sharjah	Away	29 December 2023	Won	
