= Dawlat Zadran =

Afghan cricketer (born 1988)

Personal information
- Full name: Dawlat Zadran
- Born: 19 March 1988 (age 38); Paktia Province, Afghanistan
- Batting: Right-handed
- Bowling: Right-arm fast medium
- Role: Bowler

International information
- National side: Afghanistan (2011-2019)
- ODI debut (cap 23): 7 August 2011 v Canada
- Last ODI: 4 July 2019 v West Indies
- ODI shirt no.: 10
- T20I debut (cap 14): 14 March 2012 v Netherlands
- Last T20I: 20 September 2019 v Zimbabwe
- T20I shirt no.: 10

Career statistics
Competition	ODI	T20I	FC	LA
Matches	82	34	11	95
Runs scored	513	68	143	526
Batting average	17.68	7.55	15.88	15.93
100s/50s	0/0	0/0	0/1	0/0
Top score	47*	13	50	47*
Balls bowled	3,769	741	1,652	4,345
Wickets	115	40	47	131
Bowling average	29.76	24.50	19.31	29.89
5 wickets in innings	0	0	0	0
10 wickets in match	0	0	0	0
Best bowling	4/22	4/44	4/32	4/22
Catches/stumpings	16/–	7/–	6/–	19/–
- Source: ESPNcricinfo, 21 July 2022

Dawlat Zadran (Pashto: دولت ځدراڼ; born 19 March 1988) is a former Afghan cricketer. Zadran is a right-arm fast bowler and a right-handed batsman, though he is better known for his bowling. He was born in Paktia Province.

== Career ==
Zadran was a refugee in Peshawar, Pakistan, where he started playing cricket along with Mohammad Nabi, Asghar Stanikzai, and Shapoor Zadran. He made his List A debut for Afghanistan when they became the first team to tour Pakistan since the 2009 attack on the Sri Lanka national cricket team, with Afghanistan playing 3 unofficial One Day Internationals against Pakistan A. Zadran took 6 wickets in the series, at an average of 28.83, with best figures of 3/45. He later made his first-class debut for Afghanistan against Canada in the 2011-13 ICC Intercontinental Cup and followed this up by making his One Day International (ODI) debut against the same opposition in the 2011–13 ICC Intercontinental Cup One-Day. He played both of Afghanistan's ODIs against Canada, taking 4 wickets in the series.

Zadran was a member of Afghanistan's squad for the 2019 Cricket World Cup.

He was part of Afghanistan's squad for the 2021 ICC Men's T20 World Cup.
