= Afghans in Pakistan =

افغان مهاجرين
- (Afghanistan) (Pakistan)

Total population
- c. 1.6 million

Regions with significant populations
- Throughout the country, mainly Metropolitan Areas: Karachi, Peshawar, Islamabad, Lahore, Quetta, Faisalabad

Languages
- Native: Pashto, Dari, Hazaragi; Additional: Urdu, Pakistani English

Religion
- Majority Sunni Islam minority Shia and Christianity

Afghans in Pakistan (Note: Urdu: افغان مهاجرين, romanized: Afghān muhājirīn, pronounced [əfɣaːn mʊɦaːdʒɪɾiːn]; lit. 'Afghan migrants'; Pashto: په پاکستان کې افغانان, romanized: pə Pākistān ke Afǧānān, pronounced [pə pɑkɪˈstɑn ke ɐvɣɑˈnɑn]) are part of the larger Afghan diaspora around the world. They are citizens of Afghanistan residing in Pakistan on a temporary basis—majority of whom are refugees and asylum seekers registered with the United Nations High Commissioner for Refugees (UNHCR). Most were born and raised in Pakistan during the last four decades. There may also be smaller number of Special Immigrant Visa applicants awaiting to immigrate to the United States.

In 1979, the Pakistani government established a number of refugee camps for the Afghans after the start of the Soviet–Afghan War. By the end of 2001, there were over four million Afghan nationals in Pakistan. While some have returned to Afghanistan many decided to stay in Pakistan. It was reported in 2023 that between 3.7 and 4.4 million Afghan nationals were in Pakistan. Of these, some had special residence permits while others had no documents. On 3 October 2023, Pakistan ordered that all undocumented foreigners must leave Pakistan within a month or face deportation. Large number of them left Pakistan and settled in Afghanistan. As of July 2026, a total of 1.6 million Afghan citizens are believed to be in Pakistan according to the UNHCR.

== History and migration ==
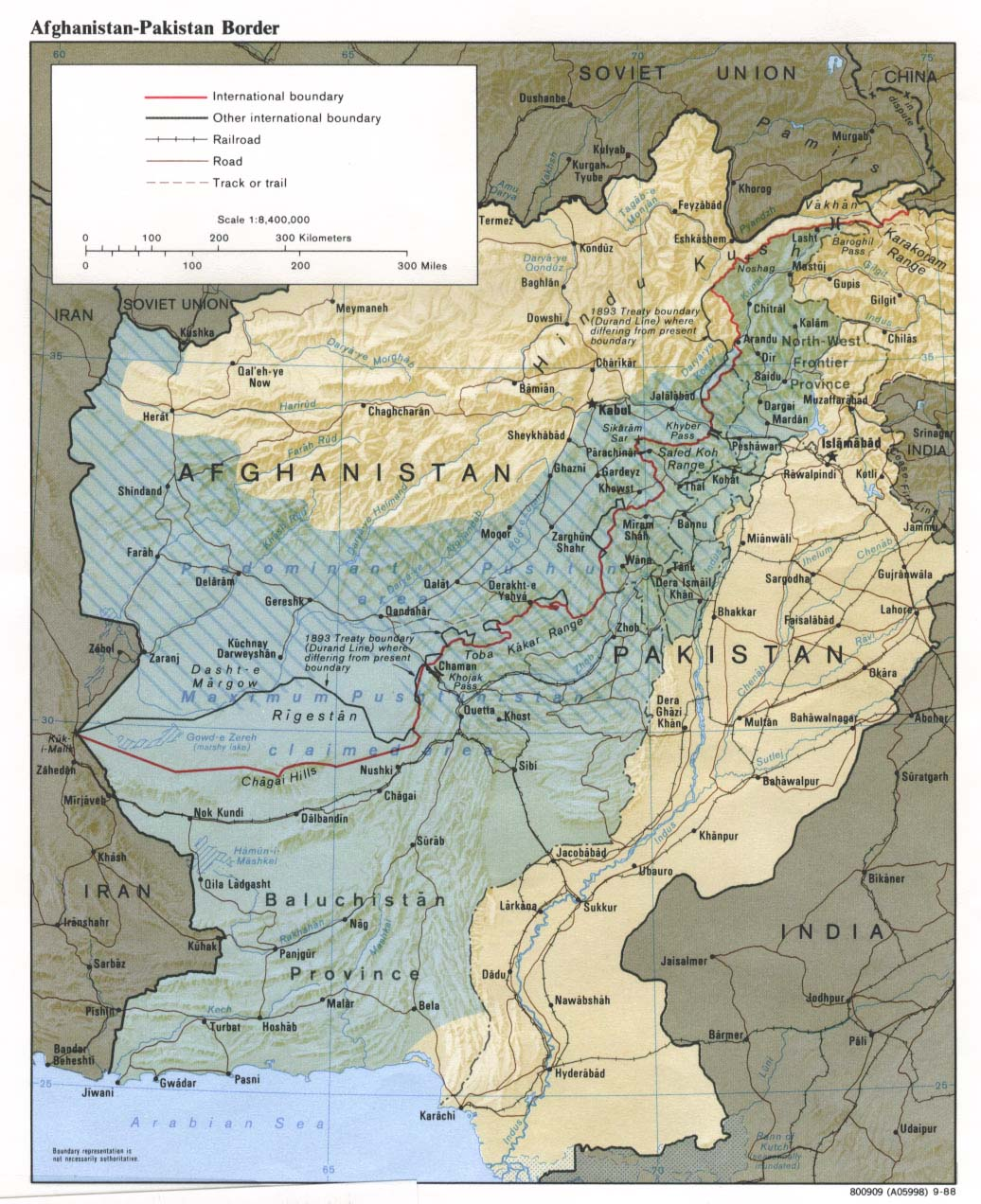
The majority of Afghan refugees reside in Pakistan's Khyber Pakhtunkhwa and Balochistan provinces

Afghans have been migrating back and forth between Afghanistan and Hindustan since at least the times of the Ghaznavids in the 10th century. The Durrani Empire was ruled by a succession of Afghan monarchs with their capitals in Kandahar, Kabul, and Peshawar. In his 1857 review of John William Kaye's The Afghan War, Friedrich Engels described Afghanistan as:

an extensive country of Asia ... between Persia and the Indies, and in the other direction between the Hindu Kush and the Indian Ocean. It formerly included the Persian provinces of Khorassan and Kohistan, together with Herat, Beluchistan, Cashmere, and Sinde, and a considerable part of the Punjab ... Its principal cities are Kabul, the capital, Ghuznee, Peshawer, and Kandahar.

Interaction and migration by the region's native people were common. After the Second Anglo-Afghan War, the late-19th-century Durand Line demarcated the spheres of influence of British India's Mortimer Durand and the Afghan amir Abdur Rahman Khan. The single-page agreement in 1947 ending political interference beyond the frontier between Afghanistan and the British Indian Empire, inherited by Pakistan in 1947, divided the indigenous Pashtun tribes. The treaty was ratified in 1905 and 1919 again at the treaty of Rawalpindi.

One of the most notable periods of migration began in 1979. As the Soviet–Afghan War began, many Afghan citizens began to flee the country. The ensuing decade of violence at the hands of Soviet forces encouraged thousands more to follow, escaping what some considered to be "difficult, if not impossible, situations," which included the threat of mass arrests, executions, attacks on public gatherings, the destruction of Afghan infrastructure, as well as the targeting of Afghanistan's agricultural and industrial sectors. In total, nearly three million Afghan refugees escaped to Pakistan and about two million to Iran throughout the decade, though some figures estimate that by 1990, nearly 4.5 million undocumented Afghan refugees resided throughout Pakistan. Aided by the UNHCR, and primarily funded by the United States government, Pakistan continued to accept and support the inclusion of these Afghan refugees throughout the decade. In late 1988, roughly 3.3 million Afghan refugees were housed in 340 refugee camps along the Afghan-Pakistan border in Khyber Pakhtunkhwa. It was reported by The New York Times in November 1988 that about 100,000 refugees lived in Peshawar and more than two million lived in KP (known as the North-West Frontier Province at the time). On the outskirts of Peshawar, the Jalozai camp was one of the largest refugee camps in the NWFP.

According to one researcher, the refugees consisted of various groups of migrants. Some were individuals "who came from politically prominent and wealthy families with personal and business assets outside Afghanistan; a small group who arrived [had] assets that they could bring with them such as trucks, cars and limited funds and who have done relatively well in Pakistan integrating into the new society and engaging successfully in commerce; those refugees who came from the ranks of the well-educated and include professionals such as doctors, engineers and teachers; refugees who escaped with household goods and herds of sheep, cattle and yaks but for the most part must be helped to maintain themselves; the fifth and the largest group, constituting about 60 per cent of the refugees, are ordinary Afghans who arrived with nothing and are largely dependent on Pakistan and international efforts for sustenance."

Though through migration many Afghan refugees avoided immense violence, they were still subject to political injustice and discrimination at the hands of their host country—Pakistan. The subsequent decade saw change in regard to the attitudes and feelings toward Afghan refugees throughout Pakistan. Though the nation initially welcomed these migrants, utilizing "terms from Islamic discourse to justify welcoming [these] refugees in their time of need", that feeling ended as issues like Kashnikov culture terrorism and ethno nationalism took root in Afghan refugees camps. In order to migrate to Pakistan, Afghan refugees were required to register to one of the seven Islamic parties pre-approved by the Pakistani government. In doing so, the Pakistani government hoped to prevent the emergence of a single, political entity on behalf of the Afghan refugees, and thus, prevent a "Palestinization" of Pakistan by a foreign settler population.

By the mid-1980s the political injustice toward Afghan refugees began to escalate to violence. In 1986 a new political party began to emerge. Known primarily as the "Muhajir Qaumi Movement" (MQM), though also referred to as the "Refugee National Movement," this party sought to gain rights for the 'muhajir' refugees on which 'Pakistan had been built.' Yet, Afghan refugees were not included in this representation, and instead were made a target by the political leaders of the MQM. Included in the MQM's 'Charter of Demands', they requested the immediate placement of Afghan refugees in camps, and the subsequent expropriation of their property, causing a number of riots by Afghan refugees to erupt throughout Pakistan. As the MQM continued to grow throughout the decade, so too did the exclusion and violence toward Afghan refugees. In addition to the violence, the MQM created a rhetoric that largely altered the perception of Afghan refugees, as they were labeled as extremist and alien to the 'secular' Islamic state that the MQM hoped to create within Pakistan.

This "extremist" rhetoric resurfaced after 9/11, and was evidence of the final shift in the attitudes held by Pakistan toward Afghan refugees. Prior to 9/11, the Pakistani government had already stopped the issuing of food rations to refugee villages, yet following the attacks on the World Trade center, and the subsequent global focus on Afghanistan, Pakistan decided to move toward the complete repatriation of Afghan refugees. Claiming that these refugees were to blame for the growing security concerns within the country, along with the subsequent branding of these individuals as terrorists, Pakistan, with support of the UNHCR, began to facilitate "voluntary repatriation". From March to December 2002, Pakistan "voluntarily repatriated" nearly 1.52 million refugees, and an additional 5 million over the following six years. Yet, there is sufficient reasoning to believe that these were not as "voluntary" as advertised, as a joint report from the UNHCR and Pakistan suggested 82% of refugees reported to "not wish to repatriate". Regardless, millions of refugees were subsequently deported, and returned to a country in which they had little-to-no ability to earn a livelihood, which was only further complicated due to the lack of resources in comparison to the number of individuals being repatriated.

Throughout history, most Afghans and Pakistanis have been crossing the border between their countries without passports or visas. But in recent years this illegal travel has been restricted. Pakistan has introduced a "visa regime for different categories of Afghan nationals."

=== Repatriation and deportation ===
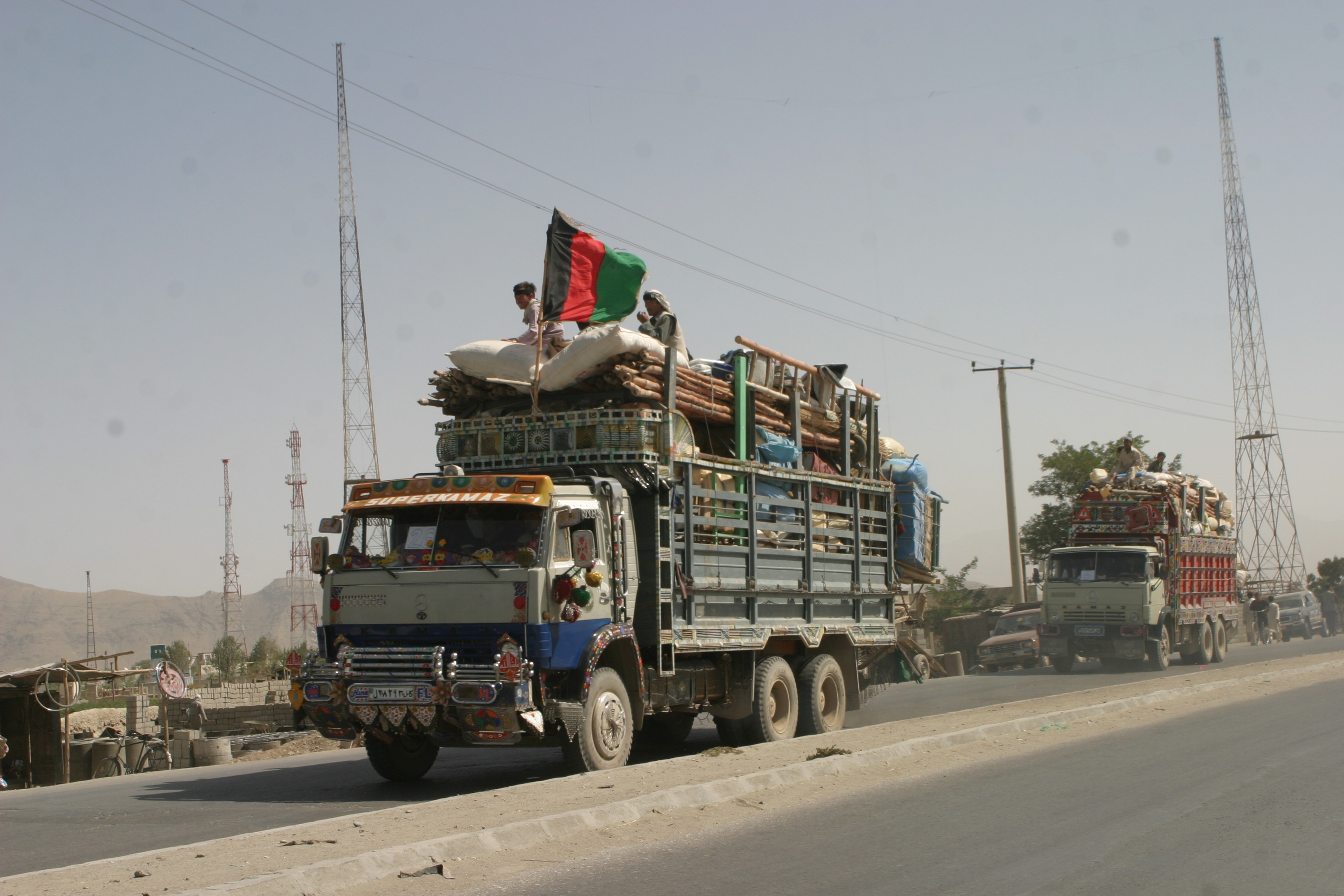
Afghan citizens returning from Pakistan in 2004

Since 2002, the UNHCR has helped 4,741,950 Afghan refugees to repatriate from Pakistan to Afghanistan.

In 2005 the government of Pakistan began registering all Afghans, and the number of registered Afghans was reported at 2.15 million in February 2007. They received computer-generated "proof of registration" (PoR) cards with biometric features—similar to the Pakistani Computerised National Identity Card (CNIC) but with "Afghan Citizen" on its front.

More than 357,000 Afghans were repatriated from Pakistan in 2007, and Afghans were repatriated between March and October of each subsequent year. Returnees were reportedly to be given land by the Afghan government to build a home, and each person received a travel package worth about $100 (which was increased to $400). About 80 percent of the returnees came from Khyber Pakhtunkhwa, 11 percent from Balochistan, 3 percent from Sindh and the remaining 4 percent from rest of the country.

In June 2010 Pakistan ratified the United Nations Convention against Torture, which forbids member states from deporting, extraditing or returning people where they will be tortured. The government of Khyber Pakhtunkhwa has increased its efforts toward a large-scale deportation of Afghan refugees from the province. The Afghan minister of refugees and repatriation announced that his ministry would establish 48 towns in Afghanistan for refugees returning from Pakistan and Iran.

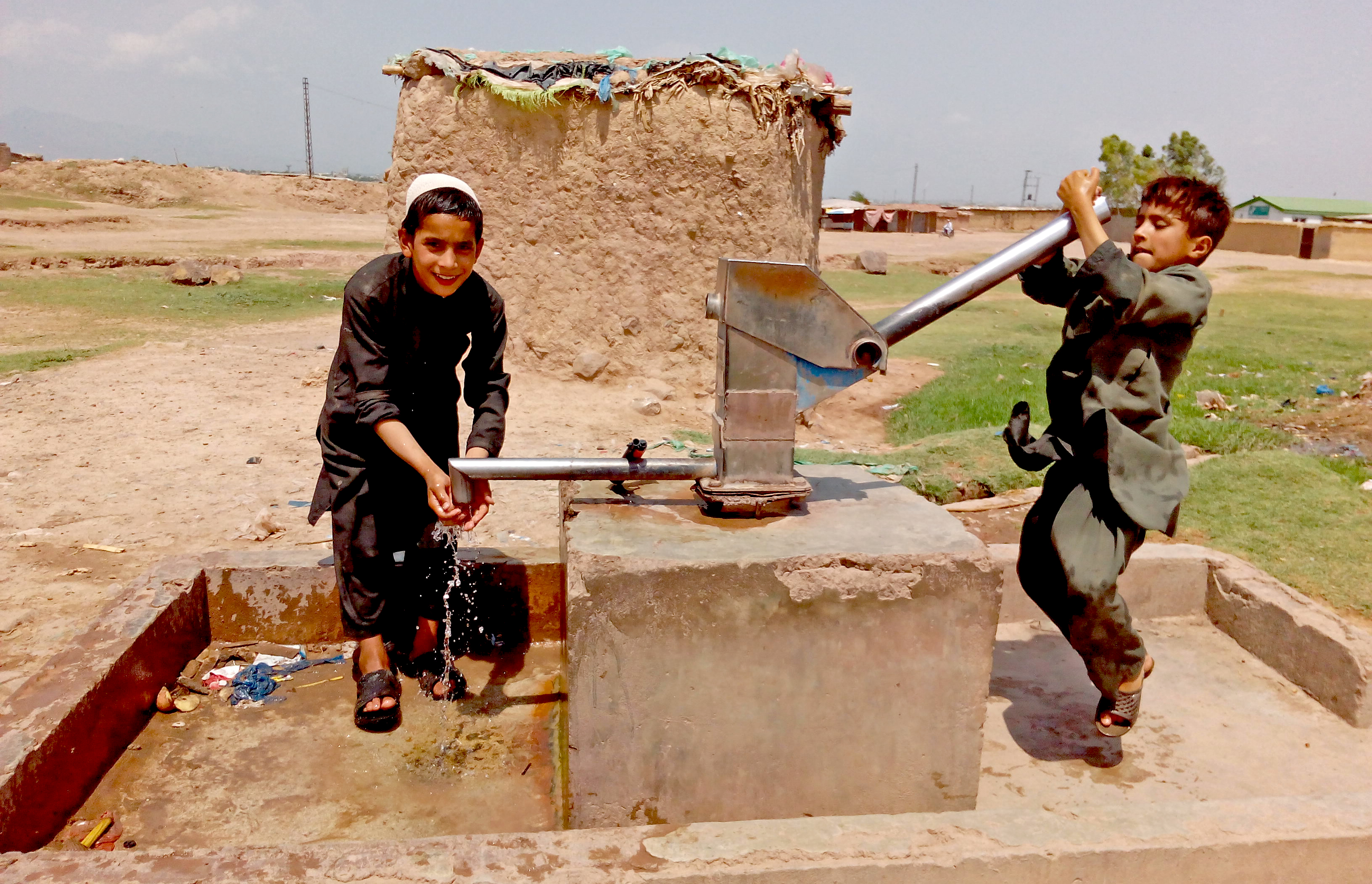
Afghan children near Islamabad, the capital of Pakistan

Between 2010 and the end of 2012, a reported 229,000 Afghan refugees returned from Pakistan. Some Pakistani officials have estimated that 400,000 non-registered Afghans may be residing in their country.

A total of 380,884 Afghan refugees left Pakistan for Afghanistan in 2016. Most were born and raised in Pakistan but are still counted as citizens of Afghanistan. The UNHCR reported in June 2026 that 777,986 registered Afghan refugees still remained in Pakistan. A small number of Afghans are waiting to be resettled in countries of North America, Europe, Oceania and elsewhere.

In 2023 the Pakistani government announced a plan to evict all illegal immigrants, including Afghan nationals, in a phased and orderly manner. This decision has led to a strong reaction from the unrecognized interim Taliban government. The Islamabad police has finished the process of marking the locations of Afghan individuals residing in various areas of the federal capital. A survey regarding the properties of illegal Afghan nationals was also underway. The interim Taliban government has called Pakistan's decision to expel Afghans living in the country without approval "unacceptable". They have raised alarms for the Pakistani government to "reconsider the decision". The United Nations and human rights groups have also expressed concerns over Pakistani plans to evict illegal Afghan migrants.

By January 2025, over 813,300 individuals had been repatriated to Afghanistan. By 25 September, the number reached around 1.5 million according to the UNHCR.

== Demographics ==
According to Census of Afghans in Pakistan, a 2005 Pakistani Ministry of States and Frontier Regions report, the ethnic breakdown of Afghans in Pakistan was Pashtuns (81.5%), Tajiks (7.3%), Uzbeks (2.3%), Hazara (1.3%), Turkmen (2.0%), Baloch (1.7%) and others (3.9%).

Khyber Pakhtunkhwa hosts the largest population of Afghan citizens with 51.1%, followed by Balochistan (28.2%), Punjab (12.7%), Sindh (5.1%), Islamabad (2.6%), and Azad Kashmir (0.3%).

=== Khyber Pakhtunkhwa ===
According to a 2026 UNHCR report, around 374,922 registered Afghan refugees reside in Khyber Pakhtunkhwa. During the 1980s Soviet–Afghan War, Peshawar was a center for Afghan refugees. The Jalozai refugee camp alone had over 100,000 residents in 1988. Peshawar assimilated many Afghans with relative ease, and the city became home to many Afghan musicians and artists.

=== Balochistan ===
About 206,914 Afghans reside in Balochistan. After Peshawar, Quetta has the second-highest percentage of Afghan refugees. They have been historically engaged in operating small businesses. A 2005 census of Afghans in Balochistan indicated that the overwhelming majority were Pashtun, followed by Uzbeks, Tajiks, Baluchis, Hazaras and Turkmen. Quetta has the largest concentration of Hazara people outside Afghanistan, based in areas such as Hazara Town. Due to social unrest and Hazara persecution, the Afghan refugees are trying to resettle in other countries such as Australia, the United Kingdom, Finland, Canada, etc.

The first wave of Afghan Hazaras arrived during the 1980s Soviet war, and more arrived fleeing persecution by the Taliban regime in the 1990s. They forged closer links with their local Pakistani Hazara patrons, whose ancestors had arrived during Amir Abdur Rahman Khan's reign in the late 1800s; these Pakistani Hazaras have some influence in the Balochistan government. Instead of living in settlement camps, many Hazaras have settled in cities.

=== Punjab ===
The province of Punjab has roughly 92,903 citizens of Afghanistan. In June 2007, the National Database and Registration Authority (NADRA) registered 16,439 Afghans in the eastern Pakistani city of Lahore; their number was reported at about 7,000 in October 2004.

=== Sindh ===
Sindh has a total of 37,549 registered citizens of Afghanistan. In 2009, their number was approximately 50,000. A UNHCR spokesman said, "Sindh is home to some 50,000 Afghan refugees and most of them are staying in Karachi". "The police can move only against unregistered Afghans, whose number is very small in Karachi", said a senior Karachi police official.

=== Islamabad Capital Territory ===
Approximately 19,355 registered Afghan citizens reside in Islamabad. Before 2006 about 25,000 lived in a refugee camp in the Islamabad Capital Territory. The camp was closed, its refugees relocated and 7,335 Afghans were reportedly living in Rawalpindi. In 2009, it was reported that the UNHCR helped about 3,000 refugees move from the slums of Islamabad to an undeveloped plot of land in a green belt on the edge of the city.

=== Azad Jammu and Kashmir ===
As many as 2,091 citizens of Afghanistan are in Azad Kashmir. During the 1980s, about 13,000 Afghans migrated to cities in Azad Kashmir. According to a 2011 article in The News International, Afghans and other foreigners in Azad Kashmir were perceived as a security risk. In 2015, there were 11,000 unregistered Afghan refugees in Azad Kashmir who faced possible expulsion or deportation.

== Society ==
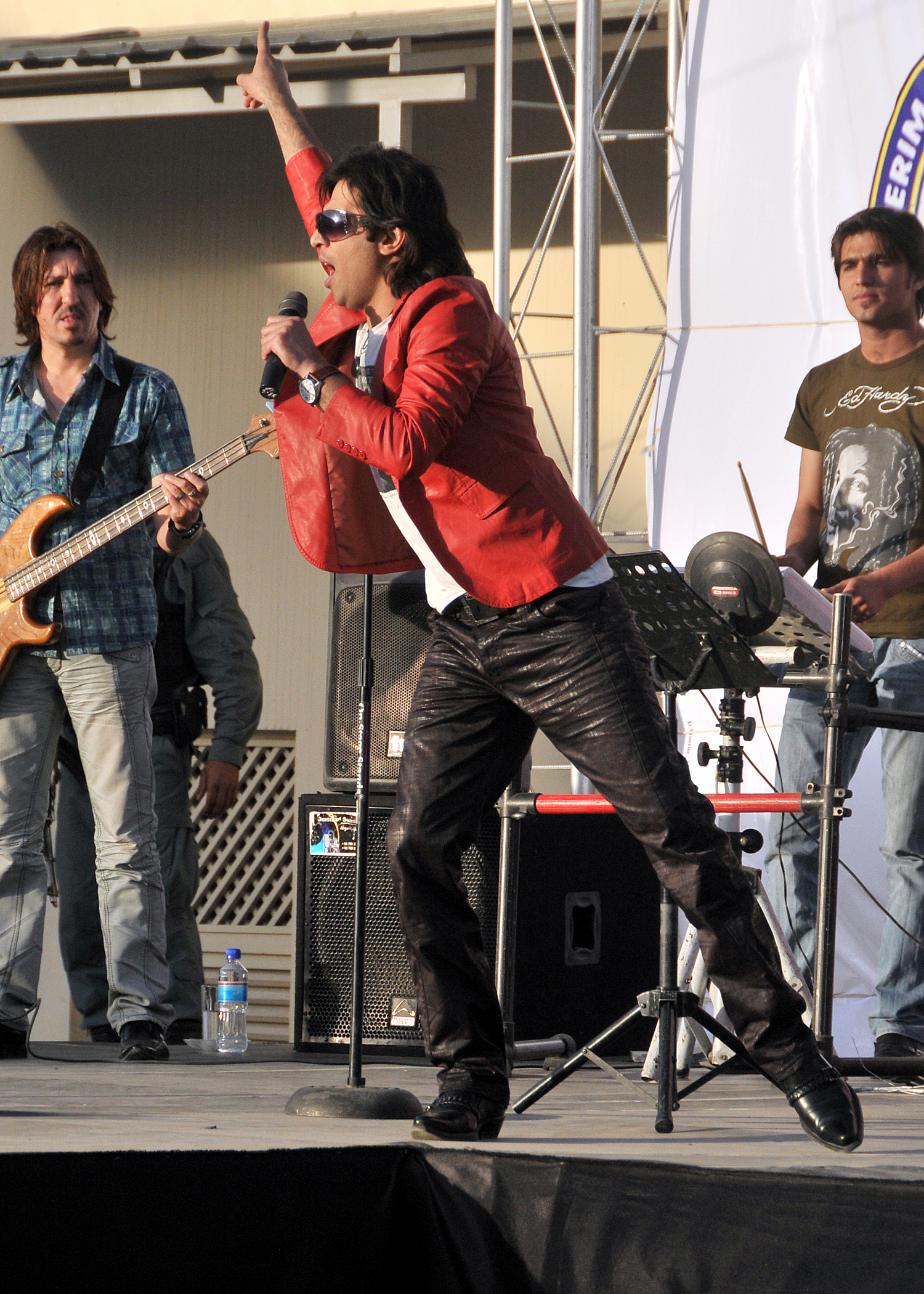
Aryan Khan, a TV personality in Afghanistan, lived in Pakistan.

=== Relationship with Pakistani society ===
Due to historical, ethnic, religious, and linguistic connections, Afghan immigrants in Pakistan find it relatively easy to adapt to local customs and culture. There are few obstacles to transition and assimilation into mainstream society; culture shock for Afghan Pashtuns is relatively small in parts of northwestern province of Khyber Pakhtunkhwa and the northern parts of Balochistan. In 1997-2001, Pakistan was very bias towards Afghan refugees that they threatened to shut down the border and forcibly return Afghan who had the right to be there under asylum.

Similarly, Hazaras from Afghanistan can easily assimilate due to the presence of Hazaras in Balochistan. However, this is not the case for the Tajiks from Afghanistan. Most Afghan immigrants are fluent in Urdu as their second or third language. Many call Pakistan their home because they were born there. They participate in national festivities and other occasions, including Independence Day celebrations. Afghan communities retain and preserve their cultural values, traditions and customs, despite years of fighting and difficult socioeconomic conditions in Afghanistan.

As per a 2018 Sustainable Development Policy Institute (SDPI) survey, this is how the Afghan refugees themselves have judged their host community in terms of positive or negative response, by province:

| Response of host community | Balochistan | Islamabad | Khyber Pakhtunkhwa | Punjab | Sindh | Total |
|---|---|---|---|---|---|---|
| Extremely welcoming | 18% | 39% | 29% | 59% | 23% | 27% |
| Welcoming | 66% | 52% | 63% | 41% | 62% | 61% |
| Unwelcoming | 7% | 4% | 3% | 0% | 5% | 4% |
| Don't know | 9% | 4% | 5% | 0% | 9% | 7% |

=== Education and socioeconomic factors ===
Many Afghan refugees in Pakistan lack formal education. At least 71 percent of registered Afghans had no formal education, and only 20 percent were in the labour market. Despite economic hardships and challenges in Pakistan, many Afghans are unwilling to return in the near future and cite security concerns and the lack of housing and jobs in Afghanistan. About 6,500 Afghans studied at Pakistani universities in 2011, with 729 exchange students receiving scholarships from the government of Pakistan. A number of Afghan schools throughout Pakistan educate thousands of Afghan refugee children. Wealthier Afghans live in cities, renting houses, driving cars and working in offices or running their own businesses; their children are enrolled in better schools and universities. Many receive remittances from family or friends living abroad; thousands of Kennedy Fried Chicken owners and workers in the eastern US transfer money every month to their extended families in Pakistan. Self-employed Afghans in Pakistan are usually involved in the Afghan rug business, Afghan restaurants and bakeries (making and selling Afghan bread), international trade, auto sales or small shops. A number of Afghans are involved in Pakistani media and entertainment as television hosts, actors and news anchors. Najiba Faiz, originally from Kunduz, is popular on AVT Khyber and other stations. Some Afghans drive taxicabs or sell fruit and other products, and others work in five-star hotels such as the Serena and the Marriott. Many work in factories or as employees of Pakistani shop owners. According to a 2007 report, Afghans were willing to work for lower wages than the average Pakistani. Afghan labour is common in transport and construction.

Prior to 2012, many Afghan traders were exempt from paying income tax in Pakistan. After 2012, the Federal Board of Revenue implemented measures to tax all Afghan traders.

=== Cricket ===
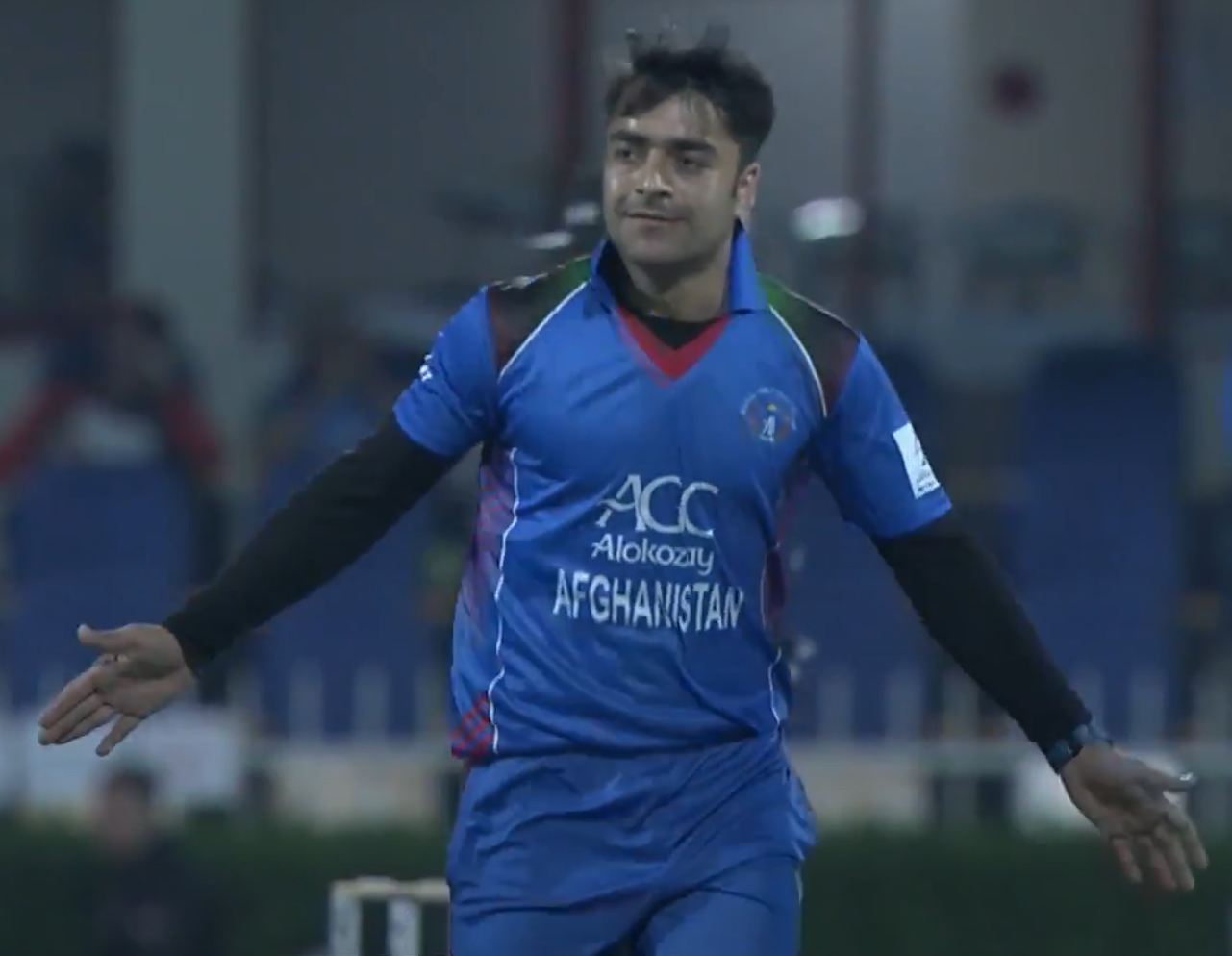
Rashid Khan of the Afghanistan national cricket team lived in Pakistan.

Cricket in Afghanistan was popularised by Afghan expatriates who learnt the sport while living in Pakistan in the 1980s and 1990s, during the post-Soviet invasion era. Most members of the early Afghanistan national cricket team grew up in Pakistan and participated in the country's domestic cricket structure, making use of cricket facilities in Peshawar with the support of the Pakistan Cricket Board (PCB). It was during this time that the Afghanistan Cricket Federation (now ACB) was also founded, in 1995. The ACF received recognition from the International Cricket Council (ICC) in 2001.

Several future cricketers representing Afghanistan emerged from Peshawar's club cricket scene, establishing an Afghan cricket club to compete against other local Pakistani sides in the 1990s.

The Afghanistan national team was coached by former Pakistani cricketers Kabir Khan and Rashid Latif in its initial years. During this period, a number of Afghan international cricketers made appearances for Pakistani domestic outfits in the first-class circuit.

Afghan cricket teams such as the Afghan Cheetahs frequently participate in domestic Pakistani tournaments.

== Health ==
The Afghan refugees in Pakistan have been assisted by various international agencies such as the UNHCR, UNICEF, the World Health Organization (WHO), USAID and others. Most live on the outskirts of cities due to cheaper costs of living. They also have limited access to health care facilities, making them more at risk of various infections and diseases. Movement of people from one place to another serves as a source of dispersal of infections to new areas.

=== Communicable and noncommunicable diseases ===
When refugees transit from non-endemic region to an endemic region, they are more susceptible to local diseases as compared to indigenous population, as they are not immune to native strains. The communicable and non-communicable disease burden is double on Pakistan as it is presently passing through an epidemiological transition. According to a 2004 report, most of the deaths amongst the Afghan refugees occurred due to cardiovascular problems. Risk of various health conditions, like cardiovascular diseases and diabetes, is expected to be more among refugees due to starvation.

The total rate of cardiac patients is 6.67/1000. Stress is an important risk factor as migration involves the breaking of relation with family, friends, culture and social interactions. Most prevalent infections in the refugee population in Pakistan are the respiratory tract infections (48.05%). Whereas, skin diseases and diarrhea collectively affect 21.08% of the Afghan refugees.

| CAUSES OF MORTALITY | 2012 | 2013 | 2014 | 2015 | 2016 |
|---|---|---|---|---|---|
| Respiratory Diseases | 219 | 215 | 265 | 228 | 219 |
| Watery Diarrhoea | 15 | 16 | 44 | 49 | 6 |
| Dysentery | 73 | 2 | 13 | 8 | 9 |
| Measles | 1 | 1 | 7 | 3 | 2 |
| Cardiovascular Diseases | 380 | 386 | 403 | 391 | 336 |
| TB | 4 | 2 | 1 | 3 | 0 |
| Hepatitis | 36 | 45 | 56 | 47 | 38 |
| Typhoid | 12 | 15 | 14 | 14 | 5 |
| Others | 831 | 1027 | 963 | 851 | 801 |

The table below shows the number of deaths per year due to the disease burden from the year 2012 to 2016.

=== Maternal health ===
Maternal deaths account for a substantial burden of mortality among Afghan refugee women. Due to pregnancy or childbirth related complications, deaths of more than half million women occur every year. According to the deaths record census, between January 20, 1999, and August 31, 2000, most of the women of reproductive age died due to maternal causes.

| Indicator | Afghan refugees, (rate [95% CI]) |
|---|---|
| Maternal mortality ratio (per 100000 livebirths) | 291 (181–400) |
| Lifetime risk of maternal death | 1 in 50 (36–81) |
| Neonatal mortality rate (per 1000 livebirths) | 25 (22–28) |
| Infant mortality rate (per 1000 livebirths) | 42 (38–46) |
| Total stillbirth rate (per 100 live and stillbirths) | 1·6 (1·4–1·9) |
| Crude birth rate (per 1000 population) | 43 (42–44) |
| General fertility rate (per 1000 women age 15–49 years) | 195 (191–199) |

1/([maternal deaths/women aged 15–49])

=== Tuberculosis ===
Pakistan is amongst the top five countries having high rates of tuberculosis. In 2011, the National Tuberculosis Control Programme (NTP) achieved 64% detection rate for tuberculosis cases in Pakistan. In Afghan refugees a total of 541 new TB cases were reported during years 2012–2015, however, no case has been reported between 2016 and 2018.

=== Malaria ===
Various parts of Khyber Pakhtunkhwa are malarial endemic regions. Malarial control remains challenging as it develops resistance against insecticides and antimalarials in use. The migration of 3 million Afghan refugees to Pakistan was vulnerable because they settled in malaria-endemic regions. A total of 10,710 malarial cases were reported from 2012 to 2018, with a total of three deaths from malaria. P. Vivax was most prevalent in the reported cases. Only three malaria-related deaths were reported in the 7-year span, although the number of positive cases was high.

=== Polio ===
The global drive to eliminate polio, which has gone on for 31 years and consumed over $16 billion, has been set back again by the new reported cases in Pakistan and Afghanistan. In 2019 there were a total of 42 polio paralysis cases in the two countries. Pakistan and Afghanistan form a single epidemiological block with a regular cross-border movement, which maintains the flow of the poliovirus in both directions of the border. The movement of people crossing the border has largely been unchecked or uncontrolled. In 2015, most reported cases of polio in Afghanistan were from Nangarhar province, which borders Pakistan, and were genetically linked to cases in Pakistan. All cases of polio in these border areas are reported in the mobile population, especially the returning displaced population. Among Afghan refugees in Pakistan, only one case of polio was reported in June 2016. The percentage coverage of immunization in children among Afghan refugees was 100% from 2012 to 2018, due to the efforts of the immunization program of Pakistan.

=== Mental health ===
Large number of Afghans residing in Pakistan have suffered from mental illness. The most common among these are: depression, anxiety, adjustment disorder, psychosomatic disorder, and PTSD. Prevalence of mental issues among refugee children has also been reported. Most common presentations in the local clinic are medically unexplained aches and pains. Observed rate of psychological disturbances in Afghan refugees is equivalent to 0.22 per 1,000 persons.

== Controversies ==
=== Legal challenges ===
Afghans living in Pakistan are vulnerable to torture, persecution and mistreatment. They have often been targeted by Pakistani authorities. After the 2014 Peshawar school massacre by members of Tehrik-i-Taliban, the militants, all of whom were foreign nationals, comprising one Chechen, three Arabs and two Afghans, and the attackers launched from a refugee camp, the government of Pakistan decided to deport tens of thousands of Afghan refugees. The strain on relations between Pakistan and Afghanistan and Afghanistan's relations with India have also contributed to anti-Afghan sentiment.

The influx of Afghan refugees since the 1980s has contributed to increased sectarian violence, drug trafficking, terrorism, and organised crime in Pakistan. According to the Pakistan Citizenship Act 1951, people who migrated to Pakistan before 18 April 1951 (and their descendants) are Pakistani citizens. Although the act was directed at Muhajir settlers who arrived in Pakistan following the partition of India in 1947, it generally included all migrant groups (including Afghans). Those who immigrated after this date are required to apply for Pakistani citizenship and identity documents. It is estimated that over 200,000 Afghans who arrived after 1951 have obtained Pakistani citizenship and identity documents, such as Computerized National Identity Cards (CNICs), without formal applications. In 2015, Pakistani authorities pledged to invalidate the documents, making older Afghans illegal immigrants. National Database and Registration Authority and passport officials, union councils and political activists were found to have created fake identities and sell Pakistani national identity cards to Afghan migrants.

Thousands of Afghans were reported in Pakistani jails in May 2011, most of whom were arrested for offenses ranging from petty crimes to not having a proof of registration card, Pakistani visa or Afghan passport. In 2007, 337 Afghan nationals were arrested for illegally traveling to Saudi Arabia to perform Hajj on fake Pakistani passports. After serving prison sentences and paying fines, they were released on the condition they will not enter Pakistan illegally again.

Some Pakistani politicians once considered the idea of issuing CNICs to the registered Afghan refugees who had continuously resided in Pakistan for at least 40 years. Rejecting the idea; one politician said, "They have overstayed their welcome, scattered across our cities and taken up our jobs". The Pakistan Falah Party led a July 2016 protest against Afghan nationals in Haripur.

=== Smuggling ===
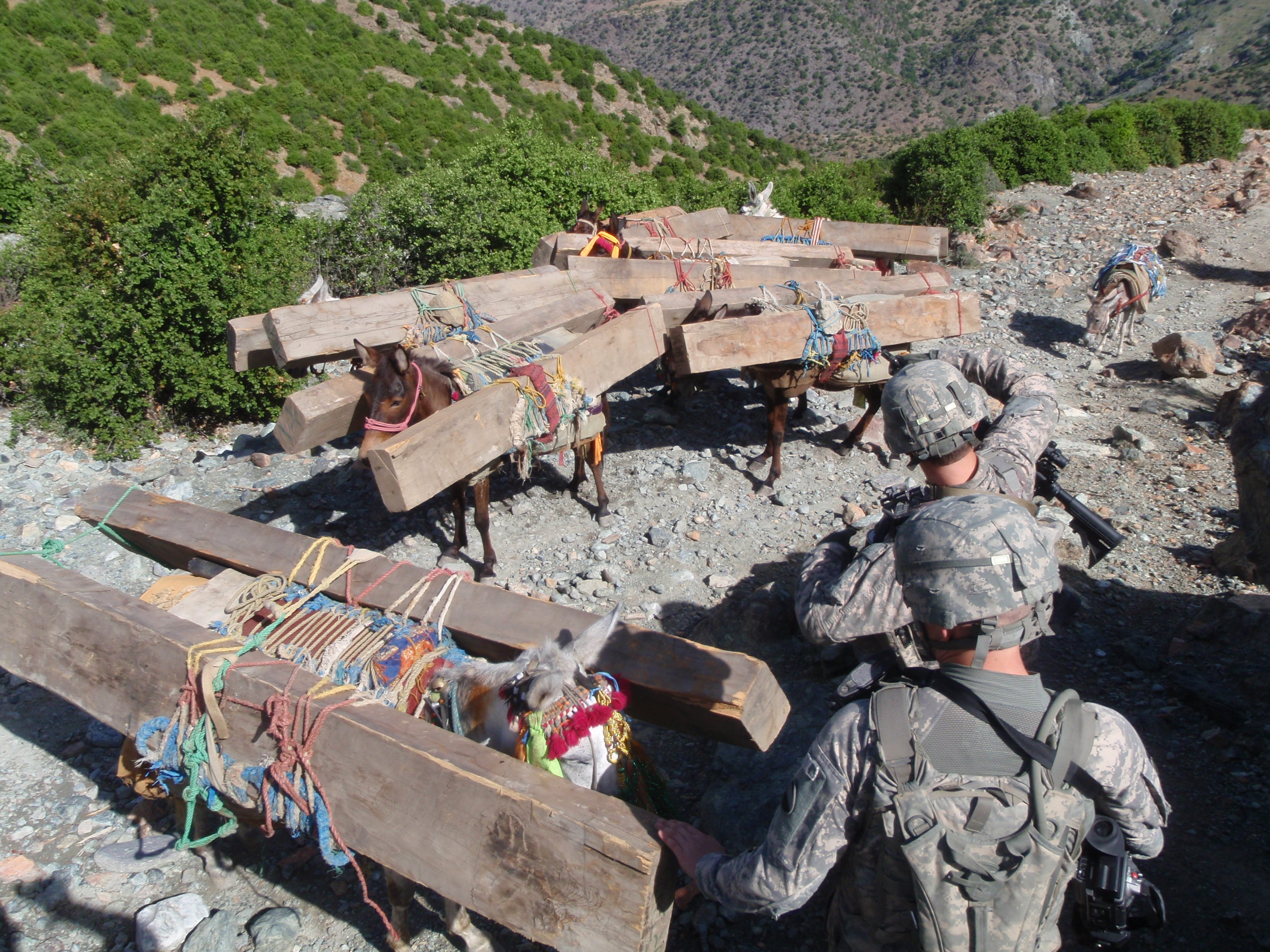
US Army soldiers intercept illegal lumber smuggled through Kunar Province in Afghanistan into neighboring Pakistan.

Smuggling became a major business after the establishment of the Durand Line in 1893, which is now controlled by a large organized-crime network on both sides of the border. Major items smuggled from Afghanistan into Pakistan have been opium, hashish, heroin, lumber, precious stones, copper, automobiles and electronics.

The drugs trade and opium production in Afghanistan have taken a toll on Pakistan. According to a 2001 report, the Islamic Emirate of Afghanistan (the Taliban government) have been unable to stop the refining and export of heroin stockpiles through its borders. The immediate result has been the extensive smuggling of drugs into Pakistan.

=== Terrorism ===
According to Sheikh Rasheed Ahmad, "families of Afghanistan's Taliban reside in his country, including in areas around the capital, Islamabad, and the insurgent group's members receive some medical treatment in local hospitals." Former Foreign Minister of Pakistan, Hina Rabbani Khar, claimed in 2011 that the Taliban residing in Pakistan had assassinated Burhanuddin Rabbani in Kabul, Afghanistan.

"What the Taliban are doing or are not doing has nothing to do with us. We are neither responsible, nor the spokesperson for the Taliban."

— Imran Khan, July 2021

Afghan militants sometimes enter Pakistan's border regions for shelter. Due to Pakistan's porous border with Afghanistan, it is difficult for local authorities and security agencies to track the movement of Afghan militants into the country. In 2003, 246 Taliban were arrested in a Quetta hospital after they were wounded in Afghanistan: "Forty-seven of the arrested Afghani elements have been handed over to the Afghan government, while the remaining detainees are being investigated by the security apparatus". After the Soviet invasion of Afghanistan in the late 1970s, Pakistan's government under Zia-ul-Haq (in conjunction with the United States and Saudi Arabia) supported Afghan mujahideen forces with weapons to fight the Soviet-backed Afghan government. Operation Cyclone is regarded as contributing to the start of militant activities in Pakistan's tribal areas.

In the past, American drone attacks in Pakistan often targeted members of militant groups (the Haqqani network, Hezb-e-Islami, the Taliban, al-Qaeda, the Islamic Movement of Uzbekistan, and East Turkestan Islamic Movement, etc.) hiding in Pakistan's bordering tribal areas, near Afghan refugee camps. Several Afghan refugees have been charged by Pakistani authorities with terrorism-related activities in Pakistan. The 2009 Lahore police academy attacks, blamed on the Pakistani militant groups (Fedayeen al-Islam and Tehrik-i-Taliban Pakistan), involved one Afghan who received a 10-year sentence. In the 2011 Dera Ghazi Khan bombings, a teenaged Afghan boy (Fida Hussain) from the tribal areas was arrested as a suspect. A group of militants was involved in the 2015 Camp Badaber attack. Several Afghans have been captured while attempting to recruit and smuggle people for militancy in Afghanistan. Rehman Malik, the former interior minister of Pakistan has commented this about Afghan refugees:

Pakistan has long sheltered Afghan refugees [but they are now acting] against Pakistan. (Afghan) nationals will not be allowed to carry out criminal activities (here). There will be complete restriction on the movement of Afghan refugees in Balochistan and KP. We have given a one-month deadline to illegal immigrants to get their refugee cards. Otherwise, they will be arrested.

— Rehman Malik, September 2011

After the December 2014 Peshawar school massacre, Pakistani authorities cracked down on Afghan refugee settlements to apprehend illegal immigrants. At least 30,000 Afghans left for Afghanistan, of whom nearly 2,000 were forecully sent there due to a lack of legal documentation. In February 2015, over 1,000 Afghans per day were reportedly returning to Afghanistan at Torkham Crossing. By September 2015, over 137,000 Afghans had returned to Afghanistan.

== Notable past residents ==
- Abdul Ahad Karzai, former politician in Afghanistan
- Afghan Girl, appeared on the June 1985 cover of National Geographic
- Aqeela Asifi, educator and winner of 2015 Nansen Refugee Award
- Aryana Sayeed, Afghan singer
- Hamid Karzai, politician in Afghanistan
- Hasti Gul, cricket player
- Karim Sadiq, cricket player
- Naghma, Afghan singer
- Niloofar Rahmani, former Afghan female pilot now residing in the United States
- Yalda Hakim, Australian journalist

== See also ==
- Pakistanis in Afghanistan
- Afghanistan–Pakistan relations
- Anti-Afghan sentiment
