= 2008 ICC World Cricket League Division Five =

Cricket tournament

2008 ICC WCL Division 5
- Administrator: International Cricket Council
- Cricket format: Limited overs cricket
- Tournament format(s): Round-robin and Knockout
- Host: Jersey
- Champions: Afghanistan (1st title)
- Participants: 12
- Matches: 51
- Most runs: (Norway) Shahid Ahmed (349)
- Most wickets: (Nepal) Mehboob Alam (19)
- Official website: Official site

The 2008 ICC World Cricket League Division Five is a cricket tournament that took place between 23 and 31 May 2008 in Jersey. It formed part of the ICC World Cricket League and qualification for the 2011 World Cup tournament. Afghanistan won the competition. They went on to qualify for the 2015 Cricket World Cup and gain Test status in 2017.

== Teams ==
- Afghanistan
- Bahamas
- Botswana
- Germany
- Japan
- Jersey
- Mozambique
- Nepal
- Norway
- Singapore
- United States
- Vanuatu

The top two teams from this tournament progressed to the Division Four.

== Squads ==
Afghanistan Coach: Taj Malik	Bahamas Coach: John Welch	Botswana Coach: Solly Chothia	Germany Coach: Keith Thompson
Nowroz Mangal (c); Ahmed Shah; Asghar Afghan; Dawlat Ahmadzai; Gulbadin Naib; Hamid Hassan; Hasti Gul; Jalat Khan; Karim Khan; Mohammad Nabi; Noor Ali; Raees Ahmadzai; Samiullah Shenwari; Shapoor Zadran	Narendra Ekanayake (c); Gary Armstrong; Whitcliff Atkinson; Jonathan Barry; Andrew Ford; Mario Ford; Lee Melville; Roderick Mitchell; Dannavan Morrison; Himchan Rampersaud; Wayne Patrick; Ryan Tappin; Gregory Taylor; Dwight Weakley	Tshepo Mhozya (c); Omar Ali; Manon Barot; Dave Buchanan; Akrum Chand; Mosa Gaolekwe; Karan Kapoor; Shah Zaib Khan; Karabo Modise; Saad Mohiyuddin; James Moses; Abdul Patel; Denzil Sequiera; Nadeem Tajbhay	Graham Sommer (c); Farooq Ahmed; Abdul Bhatti; Anees Butt; James Eggleston; Milano Fernando; Javed Iqbal; Asif Khan; Ehsan Latif; Barkatullah Masaud; Surya Narayanan; Ayoub Pasha; Srinivas Satyanarayana; Rajeev Vohra
Japan Coach: Richard Laidler	Jersey Coach: Peter Kirsten	Mozambique Coach: Ismail Hassan	Nepal Coach: Roy Dias
Ko Irie (c); Gavin Beath; Tatsuro Chino; Takuro Hagihara; Patrick Giles-Jones; Courtney Jones; Naoki Kamatani; Kensuke Kobayashi; Masaomi Kobayashi; Yuta Matsubara; Naoki Miyaji; Ahmad Munir; Kenji Murata; Satoshi Nakano	Matthew Hague (c); James Brewster; Steve Carlyon; Tony Carlyon; James Caunt; Andrew Dewhurst; Ryan Driver; Jonathan Gough; Peter Gough; Christopher Jones; Robert Minty; Thomas Minty; Sachin Patidar; Mark Saralis; Bradley Vowden	Shoaib Younis (c); Giovanni Fiorentino; Imran Ismail; Nadir Karim; Jadesh Khorava; Aasif Koliya; Imtiyaz Lili; Zainul Patel; Chandra Puspussen; Kamran Qadir; Kaleem Shah; Mahomad Sidat; Wayne Smith	Binod Das (c); Mehboob Alam; Amrit Bhattarai; Dhirendra Chand; Dipendra Chaudhary; Mahesh Chhetri; Shakti Gauchan; Paras Khadka; Paresh Lohani; Gyanendra Malla; Raj Pradhan; Basanta Regmi; Sanjam Regmi; Sharad Vesawkar
Norway Coach: Ralph Dellor	Singapore Coach: M. Venkataramana	United States Coach: Clayton Lambert	Vanuatu Coach: Tim Curran
Shahid Ahmed (c); Munawar Ahmed; Zeeshan Ali; Zaheer Ashiq; Mubasshar Bhatti; Abdul Hadi; Adeel Ibrar; Waseem Gill; Saqib Qayyum; Sameer Sachdev; Zeeshan Siddiqui; Ehetsham Ul-Haq; Aamir Waheed; Majid Zia	Chaminda Ruwan (c); Syed Ali; Mulewa Dharmichand; Christopher Janik; Chongwei Low; Rizwan Madakia; Buddhika Mendis; James Muruthi; Anish Paraam; Narender Reddy; Zeng Renchun; Mohamed Shoib; Chetan Suryawanshi; Arun Vijayan	Steve Massiah (c); Imran Awan; Orlando Baker; Lennox Cush; Rahul Kukreti; Rashard Marshall; Mohamed Masood; Sushil Nadkarni; Steve Pitter; Gowkaran Roopnarine; Niraj Shah; Khawaja Shuja; Wahab Syed; Aditya Thyagarajan	Patrick Haines (c); Michael Avok; Lazaro Carlot; Pierre Chilia; Selwyn Garae; Aby John; Trevor Langa; Andrew Mansale; Eddie Mansale; Patrick Matautaava; Kenneth Natapei; Lenica Natapei; Manu Nimoho; Simpson Obed; Richard Tatwin

== Group stage ==
=== Group A ===
Pos	Team	Pld	W	L	T	NR	Pts	NRR
1	Nepal	5	4	0	0	1	9	+3.039
2	United States	5	4	0	0	1	9	+2.104
3	Germany	5	3	2	0	0	6	+0.675
4	Mozambique	5	1	3	0	1	3	−2.159
5	Norway	5	1	4	0	0	2	−0.545
6	Vanuatu	5	0	4	0	1	1	−3.520

=== Group B ===
Pos	Team	Pld	W	L	T	NR	Pts	NRR
1	Jersey	5	4	0	0	1	9	+2.464
2	Afghanistan	5	3	1	0	1	7	+1.626
3	Singapore	5	3	1	0	1	7	+0.218
4	Botswana	5	1	3	0	1	3	−0.724
5	Japan	5	0	3	1	1	2	−1.354
6	Bahamas	5	0	3	1	1	2	−2.655

=== Fixtures and results ===
23 May 2008
scorecard

Germany; 69 (39.4 overs)	v	Nepal; 70/3 (20.2 overs)
Asif Khan 22 (81); Sanjam Regmi 3/4 (5.5 overs)		Mahesh Chhetri 23* (56); Ehsan Latif 2/34 (7 overs)

Nepal won by 7 wickets
Les Quennevais No. 1, St Brélade
Umpires: C McElwee (Ireland) and BD Papworth (Scotland)
Player of the match: Sanjam Regmi (Nepal)

23 May 2008
scorecard

Mozambique; 148/7 (50 overs)	v	United States; 150/1 (27.4 overs)
Kaleem Shah 54 (124); Khawaja Shuja 2/8 (7 overs)		Sushil Nadkarni 68* (183); Chandra Puspussen 1/40 (7 overs)

United States won by 9 wickets
The Farmers Field, St Martin
Umpires: B Hartong (Netherlands) and M Hawthorne (Ireland)
Player of the match: Sushil Nadkarni

23 May 2008
scorecard

Norway; 360/3 (50 overs)	v	Vanuatu; 177 all out (39.5 overs)
Shahid Ahmed 133* (90); Ken Natapei 1/62 (10 overs)		Andrew Mansale 41 (37); Shahid Ahmed 3/11 (2.5 overs)

Norway won by 183 runs
FB Fields, St Clement
Umpires: T Magee (Ireland) and J Mountford (Guernsey)
Player of the match: Shahid Ahmed (Norway)

23 May 2008
scorecard

Afghanistan; 179 all out (35.4 overs)	v	Japan; 87 all out (40.2 overs)
Karim Sadiq 47 (46); Takuro Hagihara 5/25 (7.4 overs)		Naoki Miyaji 19* (54); Hasti Gul 3/22 (10 overs)

Afghanistan won by 92 runs
Victoria College Ground, St Helier
Umpires: PK Baldwin (Germany) and SK Kad (Finland)
Player of the match: Karim Sadiq (Afghanistan)

23 May 2008
scorecard

Botswana; 205 all out (48.4 overs)	v	Bahamas; 135 all out (36 overs)
James Moses 40 (49); Garfield Armstrong 3/43 (10 ov)		Narendra Ekanayake 24 (38); Karabo Modise 3/8 (2 overs)

Botswana won by 70 runs
Les Quennevais No. 2, St Brélade
Umpires: M Carpenter (Jersey) and S Tovey (Netherlands)

23 May 2008
scorecard

Jersey; 189 all out (49.4 overs)	v	Singapore; 96 all out (41.4 overs)
Peter Gough 69 (121); Anish Param 3/21 (10 overs)		Christopher Janik 34 (79); Tony Carlyon 4/12 (10 overs)

Jersey won by 93 runs
Grainville, St Saviour
Umpires: L Goldsmith (Germany) and CG McAllister (Ireland)
Player of the match: Peter Gough (Jersey)

24 May 2008
scorecard

Vanuatu; 75 all out (25.1 overs)	v	Germany; 78/4 (9 overs)
Simpson Obed 19; Ehsan Latif 4/27		Anees Butt 32; Patrick Haines 3/54

Germany won by 6 wickets
The Farmers Field, St Martin
Umpires: M Gray (Guernsey) and CG McAllister (Ireland)
Player of the match: Ehsan Latif (Germany)

24 May 2008
scorecard

Mozambique; 70 (28.5 overs)	v	Nepal; 2/0 (0.1 overs)
Imran Ismail 13 (10); Basanta Regmi 5/8 (5.5 overs)		Paresh Lohani 2* (1); Aasif Koliya 0/2 (0.1 overs)

No result
Grainville, St Saviour
Umpires: M Carpenter (Jersey) and SK Kad (Finland)

- Rain ended play 1 over into the 2nd innings

24 May 2008
scorecard

United States; 108/1 (21 overs)	v	Norway
Sushil Nadkarni 47* (66); Mubasshar Bhatti 1/25 (5 overs)

No result
Victoria College Ground, St Helier
Umpires: PK Baldwin (Germany) and E Ruchtie (Netherlands)

- Rain ended play 21 overs into the 1st innings

24 May 2008
scorecard

Afghanistan; 105/5 (24.2 overs)	v	Bahamas
Mohammad Asghar 27 (40); Mario Ford 3/35 (9.2 overs)

No result
Les Quennevais No. 1, St Brélade
Umpires: L Goldsmith (Germany) and C McElwee (Ireland)

- Rain ended play 25 overs into the 1st innings

24 May 2008
scorecard

Singapore; 91/1 (23 overs)	v	Botswana
Chaminda Ruwan 47*; Omar Ali 1/17 (4 overs)

No result
FB Fields, St Clement
Umpires: L Fourie (Ireland) and B Papworth (Scotland)

- Rain ended play 23 overs into the 1st innings.

24 May 2008
scorecard

Jersey; 141/0 (26 overs)	v	Japan
Peter Gough 75* (86); Takuro Hagihara 0/16 (4 overs)

No result
Les Quennevais No. 2, St Brélade
Umpires: M Hawthorne (Ireland) and T Magee (Ireland)

- Rain ended play 26 overs into the 1st innings.

25 May 2008
scorecard

Bahamas; 46 all out (24 overs)	v	Afghanistan; 49/5 (6.3 overs)
Jonathan Barry 8 (39); Gulbadin Naib 5/7 (4 overs)		Nowroz Mangal 18 (10); Mario Ford 3/5 (2 overs)

Afghanistan won by 5 wickets
Les Quennevais No. 1, St Brélade
Umpires: L Goldsmith (Germany) and C McElwee (Ireland)
Player of the match: Gulbadin Naib (Afghanistan)

- Replay of abandoned match from 24 May.

25 May 2008
scorecard

Norway; 85 all out (31.1 overs)	v	United States; 87/0 (14.5 overs)
Shahid Ahmed 16 (37); Khawaja Shuja 5/15 (9 overs)		Sushil Nadkarni 41* (45); Saqib Qayyum 0/13 (4 overs)

United States won by 10 wickets
The Farmers Field, St Martin
Umpires: PK Baldwin (Germany) and E Ruchtie (Netherlands)
Player of the match: Khawaja Shuja (USA)

- Replay of abandoned match from 24 May

25 May 2008
scorecard

Nepal; 238/7 (50 overs)	v	Mozambique; 19 (14.5 overs)
Gyanendra Malla 71 (101); Aasif Koliya 3/49 (10 overs)		Kaleem Shah 9 (41); Mehboob Alam 10/12 (7.5 ov)

Nepal won by 219 runs
Grainville, St Saviour
Umpires: M Carpenter (Jersey) and SK Kad (Finland)
Player of the match: Mehboob Alam (Nepal)

- Mehboob Alam becomes the first bowler to take all ten wickets in an innings in an Associate's or Affiliates ODI.
- Mozambique's total is the lowest in a World Cricket League match.
- Replay of abandoned match from 24 May.

25 May 2008
scorecard

Botswana; 183/9 (50 overs)	v	Singapore; 184/7 (47.3 overs)
Shah Zaib Khan 41 (38); Anish Param 3/30 (10 overs)		Buddhika Mendis 79 (127); Abdul Patel 3/26 (6 overs)

Singapore won by 3 wickets
FB Fields, St Clement
Umpires: L Fourie (Ireland) and BD Papworth (Scotland)

- Replay of abandoned match from 24 May.

25 May 2008
scorecard

Japan; 124/8 (50 overs)	v	Jersey; 125/2 (34.1 overs)
Gavin Beath 28 (86); Matt Hague 4/26 (10 overs)		Peter Gough 59* (104); Munir Ahmad 1/21 (5 overs)

Jersey won by 8 wickets
Les Quennevais No. 2, St Brélade
Umpires: M Hawthorne (Ireland) and T Magee (Ireland)
Player of the match: Matt Hague (Jersey)

- Replay of abandoned match from 24 May.

26 May 2008
scorecard

Mozambique; 96 all out (38.2 overs)	v	Germany; 97/3 (28.1 overs)
Wayne Smith 22 (48); Ehsan Latif 3/13 (7 overs)		Abdul Bhatti 32*; Imtiyaz Lili 1/11 (7 overs)

Germany won by 7 wickets
Victoria College Ground, St Helier
Umpires: J Mountford (Guernsey) and E Ruchtie (Netherlands)
Player of the match: Ehsan Latif (Germany)

26 May 2008
scorecard

Nepal; 204(49.4 overs)	v	Norway; 96(46.4 overs)
Mehboob Alam 51 (73); Majid Butt 3/23 (10 overs)		Mubasshar Bhatti 15 (18); Mehboob Alam 2/10 (8 overs)

Nepal won by 108 runs
The Farmers Field, St Martin
Umpires: L Fourie (Ireland) and CA McElwee (Ireland)
Player of the match: Mehboob Alam (Nepal)

26 May 2008
scorecard

Vanuatu; 88/9 (24 overs)	v	United States; 89/3 (19.2 overs)
Andrew Mansale 26 (39); Khawaja Shuja 2/14 (5 overs)		Gowkaran Roopnarine 44 (59); Ken Natapei 1/1 (1.2 overs)

United States won by 7 wickets
Grainville, St Saviour
Umpires: S Tovey (Netherlands) and BD Papworth (Scotland)
Player of the match: Gowkaran Roopnarine (USA)

- Match reduced to 24 overs a side due to rain.

26 May 2008
scorecard

Botswana; 128 all out (34.4 overs)	v	Afghanistan; 129/3 (19.5 overs)
Saad Mohiyuddin 36 (77); Mohammad Nabi 4/20 (5.4 overs)		Karim Sadiq 62 (71); James Moses 1/12 (1.5 overs)

Afghanistan won by 7 wickets
Les Quennevais No. 2, St Brélade
Umpires: CG McAllister (Ireland) and B Hartong (Netherlands)
Player of the match: Karim Sadiq (Afghanistan)

26 May 2008
scorecard

Jersey; 206/4 (32 overs)	v	Bahamas; 78 all out (25.2 overs)
Ryan Driver 92* (85); Wayne Patrick 2/24 (5 overs)		Mario Ford 27 (35); Andy Dewhurst 6/20 (7 overs)

Jersey won by 128 runs
FB Fields, St Clement
Umpires: M Gray (Guernsey) and SK Kad (Finland)

- Match reduced to 32 overs a side due to rain.

26 May 2008

Japan	v	Singapore

Match abandoned without a ball bowled
Les Quennevais No. 1, St Brélade

- Match abandoned without a ball bowled due to rain.

27 May 2008
scorecard

Germany; 104 all out (32.5)	v	United States; 107/4 (28.1)
James Eggleston 20 (44); Steve Massiah 2/11 (5 overs)		Orlando Baker 45* (81); Farooq Ahmed 2/12 (7 overs)

USA won by 6 wickets
Grainville, St Saviour
Umpires: M Carpenter and Sanjeev Kad (Finland)

- Match reduced to 33 overs a side due to rain.

27 May 2008
scorecard

Norway; 110 all out (33.2 overs)	v	Mozambique; 111/7 (33.4 overs)
Waseem Gill 17 (14); Nadir Karim 3/17 (7 overs)		Nadir Karim 21 (26); Zeeshan Ali 2/18 (7 overs)

Mozambique won by 3 wickets
Les Quennevais No. 1, St Brélade
Umpires: CG McAllister (Ireland) and M Gray (Guernsey)

- Match reduced to 36 overs a side due to rain.

27 May 2008
scorecard

Nepal; 220/9 (46 overs)	v	Vanuatu; 83(32.1 overs)
Mahesh Chhetri 65 (112); Manu Nimoho 3/53 (9 overs)		Richard Tatwin 23 (37); Paras Khadka 3/26 (7 overs)

Nepal won by 137 runs
Victoria College Ground, St Helier
Umpires: M Hawthorne (Ireland) and E Ruchtie (Netherlands)

- Match reduced to 46 overs a side due to rain.

27 May 2008
scorecard

Singapore; 145 all out (29.3)	v	Afghanistan; 76 all out (20.2)
Chaminda Kumarage 32 (45); Mohammad Nabi 3/23 (4 overs)		Mohammad Nabi 24 (24); Christopher Janik 5/9 (3.2 overs)

Singapore won by 69 runs
FB Fields, St Clement
Umpires: J Mountford (Guernsey) and BD Papworth (Scotland)
Player of the match: Christopher Janik (Singapore)

- Match reduced to 30 overs a side due to rain.

27 May 2008
scorecard

Bahamas; 115 all out (24.2 overs)	v	Japan; 115/8 (26 overs)
Gregory Taylor 30 (34); Gavin Beath 4/18 (6 overs)		Gavin Beath 58 (51); Roderick Mitchell 3/16

Match tied
Les Quennevais No. 2, St Brélade
Umpires: B Hartong (Netherlands) and L Fourie (Ireland)

- Match reduced to 26 overs a side due to rain.

27 May 2008
scorecard

Botswana; 66 all out (39.3)	v	Jersey; 67/3 (15.2)
Manan Barot 16 (37); Ryan Driver 3/10 (10 overs)		Peter Gough 39* (43); James Moses 1/15 (3 overs)

Jersey won by 7 wickets
The Farmers Field, St Martin
Umpires: PK Baldwin (Germany) and S Tovey (Netherlands)
Player of the match: Ryan Driver (Jersey)

28 May 2008

Germany	v	Norway

Match abandoned without a ball bowled
Les Quennevais No. 2, St Brélade

- Match abandoned due to rain.

28 May 2008

Mozambique	v	Vanuatu

Match abandoned without a ball bowled
FB Fields, St Clement

- Match abandoned due to rain.

28 May 2008

Nepal	v	United States

Match abandoned without a ball bowled
Les Quennevais No. 1, St Brélade

- Match abandoned due to rain.

28 May 2008

Afghanistan	v	Jersey

Match abandoned without a ball bowled
Grainville, St Saviour

- Match abandoned due to rain.
- Due to a decision by the ICC Event Technical Committee, as per 12.1.6 of the ICC World Cricket League Division 5 Playing Conditions, this match was not replayed.

28 May 2008

Bahamas	v	Singapore

Match abandoned without a ball bowled
Victoria College Ground, St Helier

- Match abandoned due to rain.
- Due to a decision by the ICC Event Technical Committee, as per 12.1.6 of the ICC World Cricket League Division 5 Playing Conditions, this match was not replayed.

28 May 2008

Botswana	v	Japan

Match abandoned without a ball bowled
The Farmers Field, St Martin

- Match abandoned due to rain.
- Due to a decision by the ICC Event Technical Committee, as per 12.1.6 of the ICC World Cricket League Division 5 Playing Conditions, this match was not replayed.

29 May 2008
(scorecard)

Singapore; 201 all out (35.4 overs)	v	Japan; 67/5 (27 overs)
CR Suryawanshi 57 (37); Y Matsubara 5/59 (10 overs)		Tatsuro Chino 30 (73); Rizwan Madakia 2/7 (3 overs)

Singapore won by 52 runs(D/L)
Victoria College Ground, St Helier
Umpires: T Magee (Ireland) & L Goldsmith (Guernsey)

- Match replayed from 26 May.
- Rain shortened Japan's innings to 27 overs

29 May 2008
(scorecard)

Norway; 145 all out(47.1 overs)	v	Germany; 151/4 (37.5 overs)
Zaheer Ashiq 47 (59); Farooq Ahmed 3/19 (8.1 overs)		MA Khan 47 (95); Waseem Gill 2/26 (10 overs)

Germany win by 6 wickets
Les Quennevais No. 2, St Brélade
Umpires: CG McAllister (Ireland) & B Hartong (Netherlands)

- Match replayed from 28 May.

29 May 2008
(scorecard)

Mozambique; 88/4 (22 overs)	v	Vanuatu
Giovanni Florentino 20 (44); P Chilia 2/16 (5 overs)

No result
FB Fields, St Clement
Umpires: BD Papworth (Scotland) & E Ruchtie (Netherlands)

- Match replayed from 28 May.
- Match abandoned due to rain.

29 May 2008
(scorecard)

Nepal; 182 (50 overs)	v	United States
Gyanendra Malla 75 (112); Lennox Cush 3/28 (10 overs)

No result
Farmers Cricket Club Ground, St Martin
Umpires: PK Baldwin (Germany) & L Fourie (Ireland)

- Match replayed from 28 May.
- Match abandoned due to rain.

== Semifinals ==
30 May 2008
scorecard

Jersey; 220/5 (50 overs)	v	United States; 136 all out (38.2 overs)
Peter Gough 65 (110); Imran Awan 2/37 (10 overs)		Rashard Marshall 39 (66); Matt Hague 5/38 (9.2 overs)

Jersey won by 84 runs
FB Fields, St Clement, Jersey
Umpires: Paul Baldwin and Mark Hawthorne
Player of the match: Matt Hague

30 May 2008
scorecard

Afghanistan; 142 all out (49.3 overs)	v	Nepal; 105 all out (45.5 overs)
Mohammad Nabi 48 (64); Shakti Gauchan 3/12 (8 overs)		Mehboob Alam 17 (37); Dawlat Ahmadzai 3/18 (10 overs)

Afghanistan won by 37 runs
Grainville, St Saviour
Umpires: Brian Papworth and Trevor Magee

== 3rd Place Playoff ==
31 May 2008
(scorecard)

Nepal; 189 all out (46.3 overs)	v	United States; 93 all out (43.4 overs)
Paras Khadka 48 (57); Khawaja Shuja 5/34 (9 overs)		A Thyagarajan 28 (80); Mehboob Alam 2/8 (6 overs)

Nepal won by 96 runs
The Farmers Field, St Martin
Umpires: BD Papworth (Greenock) & C McElwee (Ireland)

== Final ==
31 May 2008
(scorecard)

Jersey; 80 all out (39.5 overs)	v	Afghanistan; 81/8 (37.4 overs)
Jonny Gough 23 (56); Hamid Hassan 4/27 (9.5 overs)		Hasti Gul 29* (40); Ryan Driver 4/26 (10)

Afghanistan won by 2 wickets
Grainville, St Saviour
Umpires: Paul Baldwin and Mark Hawthorne
Player of the match: Hasti Gul (Afghanistan)

== Plate ==
30 May 2008
scorecard

Singapore; 203/8 (50 overs)	v	Mozambique; 149 all out (46.4 overs)
Narender Reddy 44 (64); Aasif Koliya 3/26 (10 overs)		Zainulbidin Gulam 28 (85); Shoaib Razak 3/16 (10 overs)

Singapore won by 54 runs
Les Quennevais No. 2, St Brélade
Umpires: L Fourie (Ireland) and SK Kad (Finland)

- 5th Place Playoff Semifinal 1

30 May 2008
scorecard

Botswana; 126 all out (45.4 overs)	v	Germany; 117 all out (38.5 overs)
Abdul Patel 46 (105); Farooq Ahmed 4/15 (8 overs)		Abdul Bhatti 18 (33); Karan Kapoor 4/37 (10 overs)

Botswana won by 9 runs
Les Quennevais No. 1, St Brélade
Umpires: S Tovey (Netherlands) and C McElwee (Ireland)

- 5th Place Playoff Semifinal 2

30 May 2008
scorecard

Norway; 202/5 (50 overs)	v	Bahamas; 150 all out (39.5 overs)
Shahid Ahmed 77* (105); Lee Melville 2/23 (10 overs)		Ryan Tappin 51 (51); Mubasshar Bhatti 3/21 (8 overs)

Norway won by 52 runs
The Farmers Field, St Martin
Umpires: M Gray (Guernsey) and E Ruchtie (Netherlands)

- 9th Place Playoff Semifinal 1

30 May 2008
scorecard

Japan; 238/6 (50 overs)	v	Vanuatu; 139 all out (39.3 overs)
Gavin Beath 68 (97); Pierre Chilia 3/34 (10 overs)		Andrew Mansale 47 (85); Kenji Murata 2/12 (4 overs)

Japan won by 99 runs
Victoria College Ground, St Helier
Umpires: B Hartong (Netherlands) and J Mountford (Guernsey)

- 9th Place Playoff Semifinal 2

31 May 2008
scorecard

Singapore; 119 (42.1 overs)	v	Botswana; 104 (37 overs)
Narender Reddy 31 (49); James Moses 3/22 (9 overs)		James Moses 30 (71); Shoaib Razak 4/24 (9 overs)

Singapore won by 15 runs
FB Fields, St Clement
Umpires: L Goldsmith (Germany) & T Magee (Ireland)

- 5th Place Playoff

31 May 2008
(scorecard)

Mozambique; 153 all out (45.5 overs)	v	Germany; 157/8 (46.1 overs)
Kaleem Shah 46* (95); Ehsan Latif 3/36 (10 overs)		Abdul Bhatti 36 (63); Shoaib Younus 2/29 (7 overs)

Germany won by 2 wickets
Les Quennevais No. 1, St Brélade
Umpires: S Tovey (Netherlands) & Sanjeev Kad (Finland)

- 7th Place Playoff

31 May 2008
(scorecard)

Japan; 181 all out (48.2 overs)	v	Norway; 182/3 (43.2 overs)
GB Beath 27 (48); Munawar Ahmed 3/28 (10 overs)		Shahid Ahmed 81* (113); PJ Giles-Jones 2/30 (8 overs)

Norway by 7 wickets
Les Quennevais No. 1, St Brélade
Umpires: E Ruchtie (Netherlands) & B Hartong (Netherlands)

- 9th Place Playoff

31 May 2008
(scorecard)

Vanuatu; 113 all out (29.3 overs)	v	Bahamas; 116/4 (35.2 overs)
extras (b6 lb3 w29 nb0) 38; T Langa 25 (31); Narendra Ekanayake 4/15 (4.3 overs)		JR Barry 26* (71) extras (b1 lb2 w21 nb2) 26; A Mansale 2/26 (10 overs)

Bahamas won by 6 wickets
Les Quennevais No. 2, St Brélade
Umpires: M Carpenter (Jersey) & CG McAllister (Ireland)

- 11th Place Playoff

== Final Placings ==
Pos	Team	Promotion/Relegation
1st	Afghanistan	Promoted to 2008 Division Four
2nd	Jersey	Promoted to 2008 Division Four
3rd	Nepal	Remain in 2010 Division Five
4th	United States	Remain in 2010 Division Five
5th	Singapore	Relegated to regional competitions
6th	Botswana	Relegated to regional competitions
7th	Germany	Relegated to regional competitions
8th	Mozambique	Relegated to regional competitions
9th	Norway	Relegated to regional competitions
10th	Japan	Relegated to regional competitions
11th	Bahamas	Relegated to regional competitions
12th	Vanuatu	Relegated to regional competitions

== Statistics ==
Most Runs		Most Wickets	
(Norway) Shahid Ahmed(cricketer)	349	(Nepal) Mehboob Alam	19
(Jersey) Peter Gough	312	(United States) Khawaja Shuja	17
(Japan) Gavin Beath	201	(Singapore) Anish Param	16
(Nepal) Gyanendra Malla	185	(Afghanistan) Hamid Hassan	15
(United States) Sushil Nadkarni	180	(Germany) Ehsan Latif	15
(Mozambique) Kaleem Shah	170	(Nepal) Basanta Regmi	14
(Norway) Zaheer Ashiq	167	(Germany) Farooq Ahmed	14
(Jersey) Steve Carlyon	164	(Jersey) Ryan Driver	12
(Afghanistan) Karim Khan	164	(Germany) Javed Iqbal	12
(Singapore) Buddhika Mendis	162	(Norway) Mubasshar Bhatti	11

== See also ==
- World Cricket League
