= 2008 ICC World Cricket League Division Four =

- Administrator: International Cricket Council
- Cricket format: One-day cricket
- Tournament format: Round-robin
- Host: Tanzania
- Champions: Afghanistan (1st title)
- Participants: 6
- Matches: 18
- Player of the series: Mohammad Nabi
- Most runs: 267 Hussain Butt (Hong Kong)
- Most wickets: 16 Hamid Hassan (Afghanistan)
- Official website: International Cricket Council

The 2008 ICC World Cricket League Division Four is a cricket tournament in Dar es Salaam, Tanzania, which took place between 4 and 11 October 2008 as a part of the ICC World Cricket League and qualifying for the 2011 Cricket World Cup.

== Teams ==
The teams of Fiji, Hong Kong, Italy and Tanzania qualified through Division Three in 2007, while Afghanistan and Jersey secured their participation through the Division Five in 2008. The top two teams in the tournament will be promoted to Division Three in 2009.

Teams relegated from Division Three:

- Fiji
- Hong Kong
- Italy
- Tanzania

Teams qualified through Division Five:

- Afghanistan
- Jersey

== Squads ==
Afghanistan Coach: Kabir Khan	Fiji Coach: Colin Siller	Hong Kong Coach: Aftab Habib
Nowroz Mangal (c); Ahmed Shah; Asghar Afghan; Dawlat Ahmadzai; Hamid Hassan; Hasti Gul; Karim Sadiq; Khaleqdaad Noori; Mohammad Nabi; Nasratullah Nasrat; Raees Ahmadzai; Samiullah Shenwari; Shafiqullah; Shapoor Zadran	Colin Rika (c); Joe Baba; Greg Browne; Joji Bulabulavu; Iniasi Cakacaka; Joe Dabea; Simon Jepson; Sakaria Lomani; Josefa Rika; Jone Seuvou; Joe Sorovakatini; Kitione Tavo; Waisake Tukana; Fulimone Vuli	Tabarak Dar (c); Zain Abbas; Najeeb Amar; Irfan Ahmed; Nadeem Ahmed; Skhawat Ali; Waqas Barkat; Hussain Butt; Munir Dar; Ilyas Gull; Nasir Hameed; Shakeel Haq; Nizakat Khan; Roy Lamsam
Italy Player-coach: Joe Scuderi	Jersey Coach: Peter Kirsten	Tanzania Coach: Zully Rehemtulla
Joe Scuderi (c); Din Alaud; Andrea Corbellari; Hemantha Jayasena; Samantha Ketipe; Thushara Kurukulasuriya; Gayashan Munasinghe; Andy Northcote; Nicholas Northcote; Vince Pennazza; Kelum Perera; Peter Petricola; Luca Poli; Nicola Puccio	Matthew Hague (c); Tony Carlyon; Steve Carlyon; Andrew Dewhurst; Samuel Dewhurst; Ryan Driver; Jonathan Gough; Peter Gough; Matthew Hanley; Anthony Hawkins-Kay; Bobby Minty; Thomas Minty; Sachin Patidar; Ben Stevens	Hamisi Abdallah (c); Rashida Amri; Hasnain Damji; Shaheed Dhanani; Abdulkadir Dossaji; Athumani Kakonzi; Nasibu Kelvin; Issa Kikasi; Riziki Kiseto; Benson Mwita; Kassim Nassoro; Rishen Patel; Abhik Patwa; Khalil Rehemtulla

== Group stage ==
=== Points table ===
Pos	Team	Pld	W	L	T	NR	Pts	NRR
1	Afghanistan	5	5	0	0	0	10	1.329
2	Hong Kong	5	4	1	0	0	8	1.672
3	Italy	5	3	2	0	0	6	0.907
4	Tanzania	5	1	4	0	0	2	−0.658
5	Jersey	5	1	4	0	0	2	−0.912
6	Fiji	5	1	4	0	0	2	−2.385

=== Fixtures and results ===
4 October 2008
(scorecard)

Afghanistan; 132 all out (35.3 overs)	v	Fiji; 52 all out (20.4 overs)
Ahmed Shah 34 (43); Iniasi Cakacaka 3/26 (8 overs)		Simon Jepson 8 (5); Hameed Hassan 4/25 (4 overs)

Afghanistan won by 80 runs (DL)
Kinondoni Ground, Dar es Salaam
Umpires: Rockie D'Mello and Karl Hurter
Player of the match: Hameed Hassan (Afghanistan)

- Match shortened due to rain; Duckworth-Lewis revised target to win: 134 runs in 36 overs for Fiji.

4 October 2008
(scorecard)

Hong Kong; 210/6 (41 overs)	v	Italy; 164/9 (41 overs)
Zain Abbas 70 (104); Vince Pennazza 1/16 (6 overs)		Hemantha Jayasena 28 (26); Munir Dar 3/28 (8 overs)

Hong Kong won by 46 runs (DL)
University of Dar es Salaam Ground, Dar es Salaam
Umpires: Sobhash Modi and Sarika Prasad
Player of the match: Zain Abbas (Hong Kong)

- Match shortened due to rain; Duckworth-Lewis revised target to win: 209 runs in 41 overs for Italy.

4 October 2008
(scorecard)

Tanzania; 142 all out (46.2 overs)	v	Jersey; 108 all out (42.5 overs)
Shaheed Dhanani 32 (41); Anthony Hawkins-Kay 2/24 (8.2 ov)		Ryan Driver 25 (58); Khalil Rehemtulla 2/16 (7 overs)

Tanzania won by 34 runs
Annadil Burhani Ground, Dar es Salaam
Umpires: Ian Howell and David Odhiambo
Player of the match: Hamisi Abdallah (Tanzania)

5 October 2008
(scorecard)

Afghanistan; 203/9 (50 overs)	v	Jersey; 81 all out (35.5 overs)
Karim Khan 60 (106); Samuel Dewhurst 2/26 (5 overs)		Steve Carlyon 17 (34); Hasti Gul 3/20 (10 overs)

Afghanistan won by 122 runs
University of Dar es Salaam Ground, Dar es Salaam
Umpires: Ian Howell and Sobhash Modi
Player of the match: Hasti Gul (Afghanistan)

5 October 2008
(scorecard)

Italy; 318/5 (50 overs)	v	Fiji; 64 all out (19.3 overs)
Andy Northcote 102* (111); Jone Seuvou 2/74 (10 overs)		Josefa Rika 27 (48); Hemantha Jayasena 3/13 (3.3 overs)

Italy won by 254 runs
Annadil Burhani Ground, Dar es Salaam
Umpires: Rockie D'Mello and Sarika Prasad
Player of the match: Andy Northcote (Italy)

5 October 2008
(scorecard)

Hong Kong; 255 all out (49 overs)	v	Tanzania; 121 all out (40.4 overs)
Munir Dar 66 (47); Benson Mwita 4/45 (10 overs)		Shaheed Dhanani 45 (71); Nadeem Ahmed 4/19 (9.4 overs)

Hong Kong won by 134 runs
Kinondoni Ground, Dar es Salaam
Umpires: Rafik Valimohammed and Karl Hurter
Player of the match: Munir Dar (Hong Kong)

7 October 2008
(scorecard)

Hong Kong; 233/7 (50 overs)	v	Fiji; 104 all out (30.1 overs)
Roy Lamsam 55* (48); Waisake Tukana 3/33 (7 overs)		Waisake Tukana 31* (60); Najeeb Amar 3/21 (10 overs)

Hong Kong won by 129 runs
University of Dar es Salaam Ground, Dar es Salaam
Umpires: Ian Howell and Rafik Valimohammed
Player of the match: Zain Abbas (Hong Kong)

7 October 2008
(scorecard)

Italy; 171 all out (46.5 overs)	v	Jersey; 121 all out (33.3 overs)
Nicholas Northcote 38 (57); Ryan Driver 4/16 (2.5 overs)		Matt Hague 53* (80); Peter Petricola 3/21 (5.3 overs)

Italy won by 29 runs (DL)
Kinondoni Ground, Dar es Salaam
Umpires: David Odhiambo and Sarika Prasad
Player of the match: Vince Pennazza (Italy)

- Match shortened due to rain; Duckworth-Lewis revised target to win: 151 runs in 36 overs for Jersey.

7 October 2008
(scorecard)

Afghanistan; 143 all out (46.3 Overs)	v	Tanzania; 130 all out (44.2 Overs)
Shafiqullah Shafaq 25 (49); Kassim Nassoro 3/24 (10 overs)		Benson Mwita 37 (54); Mohammad Nabi 3/12 (7.2 overs)

Afghanistan won by 8 runs (DL)
Annadil Burhani Ground, Dar es Salaam
Umpires: Karl Hurter and Sobhash Modi
Player of the match: Mohammad Nabi (Afghanistan)

- Match shortened due to rain; Duckworth-Lewis revised target to win: 139 runs in 46 overs for Tanzania.

8 October 2008
(scorecard)

Hong Kong; 206/9 (50 overs)	v	Afghanistan; 209/6 (49.4 overs)
Zain Abbas 69 (119); Mohammad Nabi 5/32 (9 overs)		Mohammad Nabi 70 (78); Munir Dar 2/27 (10 overs)

Afghanistan won by 4 wickets
Annadil Burhani Ground, Dar es Salaam
Umpires: Ian Howell and Rockie D'Mello
Player of the match: Mohammad Nabi (Afghanistan)

8 October 2008
(scorecard)

Jersey; 228/4 (40 overs)	v	Fiji; 149 all out (33.4 overs)
Jonathan Gough 75 (59); Waisake Tukana 2/35 (7 overs)		Josefa Rika 35 (27); Benjamin Stevens 4/46 (8 overs)

Jersey won by 79 runs
Kinondoni Ground, Dar es Salaam
Umpires: Sobhash Modi and Rafik Valimohammed
Player of the match: Jonathan Gough (Jersey)

- Match reduced to 40 overs a side due to rain.

8 October 2008
(scorecard)

Tanzania	v	Italy

Match abandoned without a ball bowled
University of Dar es Salaam Ground, Dar es Salaam
Umpires: Karl Hurter and David Odhiambo

- Match abandoned due to rain.

9 October 2008
(scorecard)

Tanzania; 135 all out (45.3 overs)	v	Italy; 136/1 (36.1 overs)
Rishen Patel 46 (80); Andy Northcote 2/19 (10 overs)		Andy Northcote 71* (115); Athumani Kakonzi 1/30 (10 overs)

Italy won by 9 wickets
Annadil Burhani Ground, Dar es Salaam
Umpires: Karl Hurter and David Odhiambo
Player of the match: Andy Northcote (Italy)

- Replayed match from 8 October.

10 October 2008
(scorecard)

Afghanistan; 234 all out (50 overs)	v	Italy; 141 all out (44.4 overs)
Raees Ahmadzai 68 (63); Din Alaud 2/21 (8 overs)		Nicholas Northcote 35 (81); Hameed Hassan 3/19 (8 overs)

Afghanistan won by 93 runs
Kinondoni Ground, Dar es Salaam
Umpires: David Odhiambo and Ian Howell
Player of the match: Raees Ahmadzai (Afghanistan)

10 October 2008
(scorecard)

Hong Kong; 234 all out (49.5 overs)	v	Jersey; 134 all out (50 overs)
Hussain Butt 99 (132); Matt Hague 2/28 (4 overs)		Andrew Dewhurst 33* (111); Irfan Ahmed 3/10 (7 overs)

Hong Kong won by 100 runs
Annadil Burhani Ground, Dar es Salaam
Umpires: Karl Hurter and Rockie D'Mello

10 October 2008
(scorecard)

Fiji; 182 all out (49.3 overs)	v	Tanzania; 178 all out (49.3 overs)
Josefa Rika 42 (67); Benson Mwita 2/21 (8.3 overs)		Athumani Kakonzi 38 (75); Simon Jepson 5/26 (9.3 overs)

Fiji won by 4 runs
University of Dar es Salaam Ground, Dar es Salaam
Umpires: Sarika Prasad and Rafik Valimohammed

== Final and Playoffs ==
11 October 2008
(scorecard)

Afghanistan; 179 all out (49.4 overs)	v	Hong Kong; 122 all out (45 overs)
Raees Ahmadzai 49 (69); Nizakat Khan 4/29 (7.4 overs)		Tabarak Dar 33 (106); Mohammad Nabi 4/9 (9 overs)

Afghanistan won by 57 runs
Annadil Burhani Ground, Dar es Salaam
Umpires: Sobhash Modi and Sarika Prasad
Player of the match: Raees Ahmadzai (Afghanistan)

- Final

11 October 2008
(scorecard)

Italy; 203/9 (50 overs)	v	Tanzania; 133 all out (41.3 overs)
Nicholas Northcote 66 (117); Khalil Rehemtulla 4/32 (10 overs)		Hamisi Abdallah 25 (58); Peter Petricola 3/23 (10 overs)

Italy won by 70 runs
University of Dar es Salaam Ground, Dar es Salaam
Umpires: Rockie D'Mello and David Odhiambo

- 3rd Place Playoff

11 October 2008
(scorecard)

Fiji; 199 all out (49.4 overs)	v	Jersey; 172 all out (46.2 overs)
Josefa Rika 62 (89); Anthony Hawkins-Kay 4/36 (8.4 ov)		Ryan Driver 68 (84); Simon Jepson 3/33 (10 overs)

Fiji won by 27 runs
Kinondoni Ground, Dar es Salaam
Umpires: Karl Hurter and Rafik Valimohammed

- 5th Place Playoff

== Final Placings ==
Pos	Team	Promotion/Relegation
1st	Afghanistan	Promoted to Global Division Three for 2009
2nd	Hong Kong	Promoted to Global Division Three for 2009
3rd	Italy	Remained in Global Division Four for 2010
4th	Tanzania	Remained in Global Division Four for 2010
5th	Fiji	Relegated to Global Division Five for 2010
6th	Jersey	Relegated to Global Division Five for 2010

== Statistics ==
Most Runs		Most Wickets	
(Hong Kong) Hussain Butt	267	(Afghanistan) Hameed Hassan	16
(Italy) Andy Northcote	234	(Afghanistan) Mohammad Nabi	14
(Italy) Nicholas Northcote	198	(Hong Kong) Nadeem Ahmed	13
(Hong Kong) Zain Abbas	195	(Tanzania) Khalil Rehemtulla	13
(Fiji) Josefa Rika	194	(Fiji) Simon Jepson	12

== See also ==
- ICC World Cricket League
