= Afghan cricket team in Canada in 2011 =

2011 cricket tour

Afghanistan cricket team in Canada in 2011
	Afghanistan	Canada
- Dates: 2 August – 9 August 2011
Captains	Nowroz Mangal	Jimmy Hansra

One Day International series
- Results: Afghanistan won the 2-match series 2–0

The Afghanistan national cricket team toured Canada from 2 to 9 August 2011. The tour consisted of one ICC Intercontinental Cup match against the Canada national cricket team and a pair of One Day Internationals (ODI) for the 2011–13 ICC Intercontinental Cup One-Day. Afghanistan won the Intercontinental Cup and both the ODIs.

== Intercontinental Cup ==
2–5 August
Scorecard

Afghanistan	v	Canada
293 (81.1 overs); Samiullah Shenwari 70 (122); Zahid Hussain 3/56 (25 overs)		130 (38 overs); Zeeshan Siddiqi 52 (70); Hamid Hassan 7/61 (21 overs)
69/1 (11.3 overs); Karim Sadiq 37 (37); Zahid Hussain 1/16 (4 overs)		231 (85.5 overs) (f/o); Hamza Tariq 52 (64); Hamid Hassan 3/24 (6 overs)

Afghanistan won by 9 wickets
Maple Leaf North-West Ground, King City, Ontario, Canada
Umpires: Gregory Brathwaite (WI) and Chris Gaffaney (NZ)
Player of the match: Hamid Hassan (Afg)

- Canada won the toss and elected to field.
- Rain washed out day 2.

== Intercontinental Cup One-Day ==
=== 1st ODI ===
7 August 2011
Scorecard

Canada; 230 (44.5 overs)	v	Afghanistan; 213/8 (41.1 overs)
Hiral Patel 62 (85 balls); Mohammad Nabi 4/31 (9.5 overs)		Shabir Noori 94 (109 balls); Hiral Patel 4/28 (6.1 overs)

Afghanistan won by 2 wickets (with 11 balls remaining) (D/L method)
Maple Leaf North-West Ground, King City, Ontario
Umpires: GO Brathwaite (WI) and CB Gaffaney (NZ)
Player of the match: Shabir Noori (Afg)

- Afghanistan won the toss and elected to field.

=== 2nd ODI ===
9 August 2011
Scorecard

Afghanistan; 150 (20 overs)	v	Canada; 133 (20 overs)
Mohammad Nabi 47 (31); Harvir Baidwan 3/19 (3.3 overs)		Hiral Patel 45 (39); Samiullah Shenwari 3/16 (3 overs)

Afghanistan won by 17 runs
Toronto Cricket, Skating and Curling Club, Toronto
Umpires: Gregory Brathwaite (WI) and Chris Gaffaney (NZ)
Player of the match: Mohammad Nabi (Afg)

- Afghanistan won the toss and elected to bat.
- Rain delayed the start of the match. When it started, it was reduced to a 20 over match.
