= Dellor =

Dellor is a surname. Notable people with the surname include:

- Ralph Dellor (1948–2017), English sports journalist
- Tim Dellor (born 1975), English radio presenter
