= Andrew Northcote =

South African-born Italian cricketer

Personal information
- Full name: Andrew Michael Northcote
- Born: 12 April 1983 (age 43); Cape Town, Cape Province, South Africa
- Batting: Right-handed
- Bowling: Right-arm off break
- Role: Occasional wicket-keeper
- Relatives: Nicholas Northcote (brother)

International information
- National side: Italy

Domestic team information
- Years: Team
- 2008/09: Western Province

Career statistics
Competition	FC	LA	T20
Matches	2	2	9
Runs scored	55	30	103
Batting average	18.33	30.00	14.71
100s/50s	–/–	–/–	–/–
Top score	30	30	35
Balls bowled	–	–	45
Wickets	–	–	1
Bowling average	–	–	51.00
5 wickets in innings	–	–	–
10 wickets in match	–	–	–
Best bowling	–	–	1/8
Catches/stumpings	2/–	–/–	4/–
- Source: Cricinfo, 5 June 2012

Andrew Michael Northcote (born 12 April 1983) is a South African-born Italian cricketer. Northcote is a right-handed batsman who bowls right-arm off break, and who occasionally fields as a wicket-keeper. He was born at Cape Town, Cape Province, and was educated at Abbott's College, Western Cape.

== Career ==
After playing club cricket in England and Ireland from 2004 to 2006. Northcote qualified to play for Italy though his Italian mother, with Northcote making his debut for Italy against Hong Kong in the 2007 World Cricket League Division Three which was held in Northern Territory, Australia. He played six matches during the tournament, scoring 91 runs at an average of 18.20, with a high score of 47. With the ball, he took 7 wickets at a bowling average of 19.00, with best figures of 3/26. He played for Italy in the 2008 European Cricket Championship Division One, but has relinquished the captaincy back to Scuderi. He made five appearances during the tournament. He was then selected as part of Italy's squad for the 2008 World Cricket League Division Four in Tanzania, making six appearances. He scored 234 runs during the tournament, at an average of 58.50, with a high score of 102 not out. This score was his only century of the tournament and came against Fiji. With the ball, he took 2 wickets at a bowling average of 35.00, with best figures of 2/19.

While back in South Africa in early 2009, Northcote made two first-class appearances for Western Province against Free State and Border. He scored 55 runs in his two appearances, with a high score of 33. He also made two List A appearances for the team against the same two teams, scoring 30 runs. During the 2010 English season, he played club cricket for Woolpit Cricket Club in Suffolk. His next appearance for Italy came in the 2010 European Cricket Championship Division One, making four appearances during the tournament. Later in 2010, he was selected as part of Italy's fourteen man squad for World Cricket League Division Four, which was hosted by Italy. He made five appearances for Italy during the tournament, helping Italy gain promotion to Division Three in 2011. Division Three was played in Hong Kong in January 2011, with Northcote selected as part of Italy's thirteen man squad. He played in all six of Italy's matches in the tournament, scoring 126 runs at an average of 21.00, with a high score of 42. He also took 3 wickets at an average of 69.33, with best figures of 2/24.

In July 2011, Northcote played in the European T20 Championship in Jersey and Guernsey, which saw Italy end the tournament as runners-up to Denmark. This result qualified them to take part in the World Twenty20 Qualifier in the United Arab Emirates in March 2012. He was selected as part of Italy's fourteen man squad for the qualifier. He made his Twenty20 debut during the tournament against Oman, with him making eight further appearances during the tournament, the last of which came against Kenya. In his nine matches, he scored 103 runs at an average of 14.71, with a high score of 35. With the ball, he took just a single wicket, costing him 51 runs from 7.3 overs bowled. Italy finished the tournament in tenth place and therefore missed out on qualification for the 2012 World Twenty in Sri Lanka. In April 2013, he was selected in Italy's fourteen man squad for the World Cricket League Division Three in Bermuda.

Outside of cricket, he works as a games teacher at Moreton Hall, a preparatory school in Suffolk, England. His brother, Nicholas, also plays for Italy.
