= Hamid Hassan =

Afghan cricketer (born 1987)

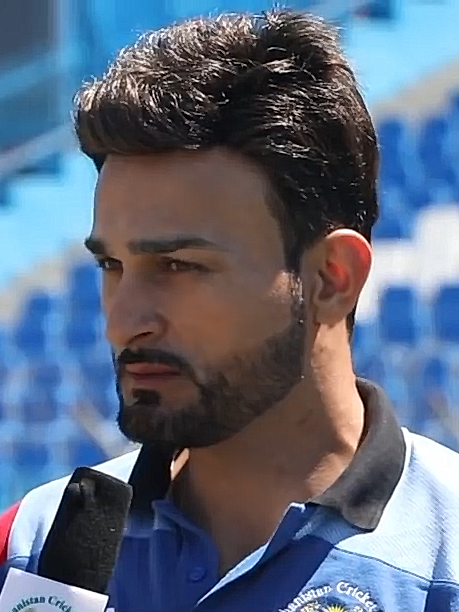
- Hassan in 2019

Personal information
- Full name: Hamid Hassan
- Born: 1 June 1987 (age 39); Nangarhar Province, Afghanistan
- Batting: Right-handed
- Bowling: Right-arm fast
- Role: Bowler

International information
- National side: Afghanistan (2009–2021)
- ODI debut (cap 3): 19 April 2009 v Scotland
- Last ODI: 29 June 2019 v Pakistan
- ODI shirt no.: 66
- T20I debut (cap 1): 1 February 2010 v Ireland
- Last T20I: 7 November 2021 v New Zealand
- T20I shirt no.: 66

Domestic team information
- Years: Team
- 2007/08: Pakistan Customs
- 2012–13: Barisal Burners
- 2014–2016: Speen Ghar Tigers
- 2017/18: Band-e-Amir Dragons

Career statistics
Competition	ODI	T20I	FC	LA
Matches	38	25	13	55
Runs scored	107	50	58	145
Batting average	6.68	16.66	5.27	7.25
100s/50s	0/0	0/0	0/0	0/0
Top score	17	22	26	22
Balls bowled	1,734	544	2,500	2,594
Wickets	59	35	67	87
Bowling average	22.54	16.57	22.23	23.04
5 wickets in innings	1	0	6	2
10 wickets in match	0	0	3	0
Best bowling	5/45	4/22	7/61	5/23
Catches/stumpings	5/–	3/–	3/–	9/–
Medal record
Representing Afghanistan
Men's Cricket
Asian Games
Silver medal – second place	2010 Guangzhou	Team
Silver medal – second place	2014 Incheon	Team
- Source: ESPNcricinfo, 21 July 2022

Hamid Hassan (Pashto: حميد حسن; born 1 June 1987) is a former Afghan cricketer. He is a right-arm fast bowler and a right-handed batsman who mainly plays as a bowler. He made his international debut in April 2009.

== Early life and career ==
Hassan was born in 1987. He is the second of three sons; Rashid being his elder brother and Shamshad the younger one. When Hassan was six years old, his family fled fighting in their home district of Bati Kot near Jalalabad, Afghanistan to go to Pakistan as refugees. They lived in a refugee camp in Peshawar, where Hassan learned to play cricket on the streets with a taped tennis ball from his elder brother. Cricket had a stigma among his people, and when his grades started to suffer at school as a result of cricket, his parents tried to stop him from playing, but he continued to play in secret. Hassan joined a cricket club in 2002 and got selected for a team to go to the Asian Cricket Council Under-17 Trophy in 2003.

Hassan weighed nearly 18 stone (110 kg), but after watching the 2005 Ashes series on TV and being inspired by Andrew Flintoff, he lost weight until he was down to 13 stone (83 kg) so that he could bowl fast. In March 2006, Hassan played a match for Afghanistan against a Marylebone Cricket Club team led by Mike Gatting in Mumbai. Afghanistan thrashed the MCC by 179 runs, and Hassan took the wicket of Gatting. He was subsequently invited to join MCC Young Cricketers. At 20 years of age, Hassan became the first Afghan to play cricket at Lord's. He played for the Marylebone Cricket Club in a match against a European XI in June 2007. He bowled with good control at over 145 kilometres per hour (90 mph), with Gatting calling him a "huge potential".

== International career ==
=== World Cricket League ===
Hassan was part of Afghanistan's squad for the 2008 ICC World Cricket League Division Five in Jersey, which was the start of the qualification process for the 2011 Cricket World Cup. Hassan took three wickets in Afghanistan's win against Botswana and two wickets in their win over Nepal, which gave Afghanistan a place in the tournament final and ensured they would progress to the next stage of World Cup qualification.

It is a huge win for Afghanistan. For four months we have been thinking about Division Four, so it is like a dream come true. The [World Cup] dream is alive and we'll try our best to get to 2011. The people in Afghanistan will be very happy and there will be huge celebrations. They will all be in the roads dancing and everything.

— Hamid Hassan

He was Afghanistan's best bowler in the tournament final against Jersey, taking four wickets for 27 runs, decimating Jersey's middle order and giving Afghanistan control of the match.

Hassan began division four with a dominant performance against Fiji. Though Afghanistan had only managed to score 132 runs in their innings, Hassan took four wickets for 25 runs as Afghanistan bowled out Fiji for just 52, starting the tournament with an 80-run win. Hassan was influential through the rest of the tournament, taking three wickets against Tanzania and running out Joe Scuderi when Afghanistan defeated Italy, gaining another promotion to the next stage of the World Cricket League. Afghanistan won the tournament final against Hong Kong, and Hassan almost finished the tournament with a hat-trick. He took two wickets on consecutive deliveries, but bowled a front-foot no-ball on the third. Hassan was then an instrumental part of Afghanistan's team for division three, taking three wickets in matches against both Papua New Guinea and Cayman Islands. Afghanistan won the tournament and qualified for the World Cup Qualifier, returning to Afghanistan expecting a large crowd to receive them in Kabul.

I am very excited about seeing them. When we won Division 4 in Tanzania there were lots of people at the airport. So as we have won Division 3, there will be even more people there, blocking the roads and celebrating by banging drums. I really enjoy the celebrations as we have such great fans. The people in Afghanistan pray for us and are waiting for the trophy to come home so we can all celebrate together.

— Hamid Hassan

=== World Cup Qualifier ===
Hassan was in Afghanistan's squad for the 2009 Cricket World Cup Qualifier, which was the first time Afghanistan had participated in the event. During the group stage of the tournament, Hassan mostly played as a first-change bowler, and he surprised opposition teams in the tournament with his skill and pace, with Bermuda captain Irving Romaine claiming he was one of the fastest bowlers in the tournament.

I was surprised when the last seam bowler [Hassan] came on. He is a quality bowler, one of the fastest in the tournament. We did not expect that at all and he is a top-notch bowler.

— Irving Romaine

Hassan took two wickets against Bermuda, and Afghanistan progressed from the group stage of the tournament to the Super Eights. Opening the bowling against Ireland, Hassan took five wickets. He dismissed William Porterfield early, then removed Ireland's two established batsmen Andrew White and Kevin O'Brien in consecutive overs before taking two more wickets in Ireland's tail. Four of his five wickets came bowled. His bowling performance was enough to give Afghanistan a 22-run win, causing a massive upset over the team who went on to win the tournament. Hassan was far less successful in the next match against Canada, conceding 32 runs in three overs. Afghanistan lost to Canada and their chances of qualifying for the World Cup were virtually over. Hassan finished the tournament with 3/37 against Namibia and 3/26 against Scotland, and though they didn't qualify for the World Cup, Afghanistan did achieve official One Day International status for the next four years. In 2010, Hassan compared Afghanistan's rise through the ranks of international cricket with the film Rocky.

I think that there is a similarity in the story of Rocky and the Afghanistan cricket team – we both started at the bottom and gradually made our way up the rankings. It is easy to forget how far we have come in the last two years since we played at the World Cricket League Division 5 in Jersey.

— Hamid Hassan

=== Early success in first-class cricket ===
Hassan played for Afghanistan in the 2009–10 ICC Intercontinental Cup, the first time Afghanistan had participated in the first-class tournament. In a match against the Netherlands, Hassan took four wickets in the first innings and was batting at the end of the final innings when Afghanistan won the thrilling match by a single wicket.

Hassan recorded his first ten-wicket haul against Scotland. After Afghanistan had been bowled out for 435 runs in the first innings, Hassan bowled first change and almost took the wicket of Fraser Watts immediately. Watts hit the ball straight to second slip, but the fielder dropped the catch and the ball went to the boundary for four runs. Later in the over he got Watts to edge the ball in the same direction and had him caught. He then caused a middle-order collapse, taking five wickets in a period in which Scotland lost seven wickets for just 19 runs. Most of his wickets came caught behind by the wicket-keeper, and he finished the innings with 6 wickets for 40 runs. During Scotland's second innings, Hassan injured his ankle and was told by doctors not to bowl, but he decided to bowl regardless and bowled a further 27 overs. He took 5 wickets in the second innings to finish with 11 for the match.

In Afghanistan's next match against Kenya, Hassan got his second ten-wicket haul. He took five of Afghanistan's first six wickets in the first innings to leave Kenya at 90 for 6, then followed it up with 6 wickets in the second innings to single-handedly win the game for Afghanistan on the final day. This took Afghanistan to the Intercontinental Cup Final against Scotland, where Afghanistan won by seven wickets and Hassan was named the player of the match after taking 8 wickets despite playing with a heel injury.

I kept wicket a lot with Wasim and Waqar who are both mentally and physically very strong and they used to bowl spells of 18 and 20 overs on the trot and to see Hamid come in and bowl 22 odd overs on the trot I think is amazing. I didn't think anybody could bowl 22 overs in a row, but Hamid did and it was simply great stuff.

— Rashid Latif, Afghanistan coach

Hassan took by far the most wickets for the whole tournament, with 43 wickets from 6 matches at a bowling average of 19.18 (the next-most wickets was 24 wickets by Scotland's Majid Haq). He was named as one of the bowlers in the team of the tournament.

In March 2011 he was called up by the Marylebone Cricket Club to represent them in the Champion County match against Nottinghamshire. He was impressive with the ball, taking seven wickets for the match, but his most entertaining performance was with the bat. He came out at number 11 in MCC's first innings and hit his first three deliveries for four. He scored 26 runs from 14 deliveries before being dismissed.

=== 2010 World Twenty20 ===
Hassan was a crucial part of the Afghanistan team in the 2010 ICC World Twenty20 Qualifier as their specialist death bowler, bowling the final overs of most matches. He took wickets throughout the tournament and played an important role in Afghanistan's wins over Scotland, the United States and the United Arab Emirates. Afghanistan won the tournament and qualified for the 2010 ICC World Twenty20, and Hassan himself took 12 wickets throughout the tournament at a bowling average of just 11.14.

At the World Twenty20, Hassan was a standout both with the ball and, unusually, with the bat. In Afghanistan's second and final match against South Africa, Hassan bowled very well at the death, taking 3 wickets for 21 runs from his four overs to restrict South Africa to 139 runs. Afghanistan then collapsed to be 32 for 8 when Hassan came to the crease, but he scored a quick 22 runs from 21 balls to help Afghanistan avoid the lowest score of the tournament. Despite having lost both matches, Hassan was proud of Afghanistan's performance at the World Twenty20 and believed they needed to play more matches against full members to improve.

Looking back on the event, I think we have shown that we have the potential to compete against some of the Full Members, and it is just a shame that we didn't qualify for the [50-over] World Cup 2011 as I think with another year to improve we could have surprised a few teams. We have shown what we have been able to do in these two matches and with more regular exposure to top quality batters and bowlers then we can get better.

— Hamid Hassan

=== 2011–15 Cycle: Injuries and World Cup Debut ===
Following the 2011 Cricket World Cup, which Afghanistan did not qualify for, Hassan played with Afghanistan in both the 2011–13 ICC Intercontinental Cup and the 2011–13 ICC World Cricket League Championship, which ran simultaneously to each other. After playing cricket against domestic teams in Pakistan and Sri Lanka, these tournaments began for Afghanistan in Canada in August 2011. Afghanistan batted first in the Intercontinental Cup match, and were bowled out for 293 before the end of the first day. Afghanistan then had 12 overs to bowl to Canada before the end of the day, and Hassan managed to take four wickets for 12 runs before stumps. He followed this up the next day with 3 more wickets to achieve figures of 7/61, his best ever first-class bowling figures. Hassan then took three early wickets in Canada's second innings to record his third ten-wicket haul, and he was named the player-of-the match in a nine-wicket win.

Hassan was selected to play for a combined Associate and Affiliate XI in a tour match against England in Dubai in January 2012. Hassan took two early wickets in England's first innings, but on the second day he fell over the boundary fence and injured himself, causing him to miss the rest of the match. Though he was initially cleared of any serious damage, the knee injury kept him out of international cricket until he was named in Afghanistan's squad for the 2012 ICC World Twenty20, where due to fitness concerns he was still unable to play any matches.

Hassan returned to good bowling form in the latter half of 2013, with impressive bowling performances in limited overs cricket against Namibia and Kenya as Afghanistan secured qualification for the 2015 Cricket World Cup. His return to form was expected to make him a key player in the 2013 ICC World Twenty20 Qualifier, and Afghanistan went into the tournament as favourites to win it, but his knee injury flared up again after playing just one match and he missed the rest of the tournament. He was replaced in Afghanistan's squad by Izatullah Dawlatzai and they still qualified for the World Twenty20 without Hassan. Hassan was named in Afghanistan's squad for both the 2014 Asia Cup and the 2014 ICC World Twenty20, but his knee injury continued to cause problems and he missed more matches.

Hassan again returned from injury in December 2014 for an ODI series against the UAE, and he took 5 for 45 in the fourth match of the series. This gave Afghanistan the confidence to include him in their squad for the 2015 Cricket World Cup despite his proneness to injury. Hassan opened the bowling in Afghanistan's opening match against Bangladesh, bowling Afghanistan's first ever ball in a World Cup match. He was able to keep Bangladesh's openers slow at the start of the match, but he finished the match with expensive figures of 2/61 and Afghanistan lost by 105 runs. Hassan's bowling was fast and precise against Sri Lanka. He dismissed Kumar Sangakkara early with a delivery that swung in from outside off to bowl him, celebrating with a cartwheel and leaving Sri Lanka at 3/18. Hassan then bowled two consecutive deliveries past the edge of Dimuth Karunaratne's bat before having him caught at slip at 4/51. Hassan took three wickets in total, and for most of the match it looked like Afghanistan could win, but late in the innings Thisara Perera hit a very quick 47 runs from 26 balls to get Sri Lanka across the line. Hassan gained international notoriety after this match because he celebrated taking the wicket of Kumar Sangakkara with a cartwheel.

Afghanistan's match against Scotland was their only match against a fellow associate team for the World Cup, and thus the match they were considered most likely to win. After bowling a very economical 1/32 from 10 overs in the first innings, Hassan came in to bat in the second innings with Afghanistan still needing another 79 runs for victory. He provided support for teammate Samiullah Shenwari in a ninth-wicket stand of 60 runs, following Shenwari's instructions about when to farm the strike and when to rotate it. Shenwari hit a number of sixes in their partnership, but was caught at deep midwicket attempting a fourth inside one over. This left Hassan with fellow tailender Shapoor Zadran still needing to score another 19 runs to achieve victory. Hassan stayed in until the end of the innings with 15 runs in over an hour of batting, and Shapoor hit the winning runs in the final over to give Afghanistan their maiden World Cup victory.

Hassan bowled Australian James Faulkner with a beautiful in-swinging yorker in Afghanistan's fourth match, but his bowling figures were 1/70 from 10 overs and Afghanistan lost by 275 runs to the eventual champions. Following the match, Hassan spoke with Australian fast bowler Mitchell Starc about shoes, as Hassan had gone through five pairs of bowling shoes already in the World Cup.

We have got problems with Hassan, particularly. The soles keep breaking off and Mitchell Starc brought his boots out and they discussed how he gets them made, where he sends them and they did talk about some bowling.

— Andy Moles, Afghanistan coach

Hassan bowled economically against New Zealand with 0/36 off of 7 overs, and in Afghanistan's final match against England he was the only Afghanistan bowler to take a wicket, removing Alex Hales with a thin outside edge. Despite being referred to by ground announcers as a medium-pace bowler, Hassan was Afghanistan's fastest bowler at the World Cup; his bowling was measured at speeds of over 140 kilometres per hour (87 mph).

=== 2015–present ===
Hassan played Afghanistan's first three matches in the 2015 ICC World Twenty20 Qualifier, taking six wickets across the three matches, but he limped off the field after bowling the 19th over against Scotland and missed Afghanistan's subsequent two matches, both of which were losses. He returned to the side for a win against Papua New Guinea, which put Afghanistan into the 2016 ICC World Twenty20. Due to a thigh injury, Hassan was not able to represent Afghanistan again until the World Twenty20 itself, missing all matches between the two tournaments. He was ineffective at the World Twenty20, only playing four of Afghanistan's seven matches and taking three wickets.

Hassan was last selected to play for the national team in a T20I series against Zimbabwe in February 2018, but he again got injured in the team's training camp in Sharjah and was advised to rest. His last international match for some time was in July 2016. He was attempting to return to the national team in time to play in the 2019 Cricket World Cup. In April 2019, he was named in Afghanistan's squad for the 2019 Cricket World Cup. The International Cricket Council (ICC) named him as one of the five surprise picks for the tournament. Ahead of the World Cup he announced he intended to retire from ODI cricket after the World Cup due to injuries, and he suffered a hamstring injury during his second over in Afghanistan's game against Pakistan during the World Cup preventing him from taking further part in both the game and the tournament. He announced his ODI retirement after the game, but expressed he may continue playing T20 cricket.

In September 2021, he was named in Afghanistan's squad for the 2021 ICC Men's T20 World Cup.

== Domestic cricket ==
=== England ===
In 2009, Hassan signed to play for Skegness Cricket Club for six seasons in the Lincolnshire Premier League. He took 7/53 in his debut match, but after the 2009 season he didn't play for Skegness again.

=== Bangladesh Premier League ===
Hassan signed to play with the Barisal Burners in the 2012 season for $40,000 but his injuries meant he was unable to play. He signed again for the 2013 season for the same salary.

== Player profile ==
=== Bowling ===
Hassan is a right-arm fast bowler. At times he has been measured bowling over 145 kilometres per hour (90 mph). In the 2015 Cricket World Cup he took the wickets of world-class batsmen such as Kumar Sangakkara, causing problems with his pace and swing. He took 50 wickets in his first 26 One Day Internationals, making him the sixth fastest player of all time to reach 50 ODI wickets.

=== Batting ===
Hassan is a lower-order batsman with a very low batting average in international cricket. Despite a general lack of success with the bat, he has played good batting innings. He scored 26 runs off of just 14 balls in the 2011 Champion County match, and he scored 22 runs in a match in the 2010 ICC World Twenty20, the second-highest score for Afghanistan in the innings.

== Commentary ==
Hassan commentated the 2018 Afghanistan Premier League both in international and Afghan languages.

== Personal life ==
Hassan's house in Jalalabad was targeted by a grenade attack in February 2018. Hassan was unharmed in the attack. Hassan's family claimed that the attack came in the wake of criminal groups demanding money from the family. The Afghanistan Cricket Board stated that the attack was carried out by criminal groups, not by terrorists.
