= Gary Armstrong (cricketer) =

Bahamian cricketer (born 1965)

Personal information
- Full name: Garfield McCline Armstrong
- Born: 17 April 1965 (age 61); Bahamas
- Batting: Right-handed
- Bowling: Right-arm medium
- Relatives: Llewellyn Armstrong (brother)

International information
- National side: Bahamas

Career statistics
Competition	T20
Matches	1
Runs scored	1
Batting average	1.00
100s/50s	–/–
Top score	1
Balls bowled	24
Wickets	2
Bowling average	11.00
5 wickets in innings	–
10 wickets in match	–
Best bowling	2/22
Catches/stumpings	1/–
- Source: Cricinfo, 28 May 2010

Garfield 'Gary' McCline Armstrong (born 17 April 1965) is a former Bahamian cricketer. Armstrong is a right-handed batsman who bowled right-arm medium pace. Armstrong had represented the Bahamas national cricket team in 27 matches.

Armstrong made his debut for the Bahamas in the 2002 ICC Americas Championship against the United States.

Armstrong made his only Twenty20 appearance for the Bahamas against the Cayman Islands in the 1st round of the 2006 Stanford 20/20. Armstrong scored 1 run and took 2/22 with the ball, as the Bahamas lost by 57 runs.

Armstrong also represented the Bahamas in the 2008 ICC World Cricket League Division Five the 2010 ICC Americas Championship Division 2, where his final appearance for the Bahamas came against Suriname.

== Family ==
Armstrong's brother, Llewellyn Armstrong has also played for and captained the Bahamas.
