= Shahid Ahmed (cricketer) =

Pakistani cricketer (born 1975)

Personal information
- Born: 5 February 1975 (age 51); Pakistan

International information
- National side: Norway (2003-2012/3)
- Source: Cricinfo, 7 May 2016

Shahid Ahmed (Note: His name is given as Shahid Ahmad in some sources.) (born 5 February 1975) is a Pakistan born Norwegian cricketer, who captained the side in the 2008 ICC World Cricket League Division Five tournament. He is a left-hand batsman and right arm off-break bowler.

== Career ==
Ahmed captained Norway in the 2008 ICC World Cricket League Division Five tournament. In Norway's opening match against Vanuatu, Ahmed scored 133*, the only century scored in the tournament, and took 3/11. Against the United States, Ahmed top scored with 16, as Norway were bowled out for 85 in 31 overs. He was the leading run scorer in the tournament with 349 runs, and was later named in the Team of the Tournament. Ahmed was also the top scorer in the 2011 Masroor International Cricket Twenty 20 tournament, scoring 173 runs in 6 innings.
