= Mario Ford =

Bahamian cricketer (born 1958)

Personal information
- Full name: Mario Locksley Ford
- Born: 26 June 1958 (age 68); Bahamas
- Batting: Left-handed
- Bowling: Right-arm medium

International information
- National side: Bahamas

Career statistics
Competition	T20
Matches	2
Runs scored	33
Batting average	16.50
100s/50s	–/–
Top score	25
Balls bowled	–
Wickets	–
Bowling average	–
5 wickets in innings	–
10 wickets in match	–
Best bowling	–
Catches/stumpings	–/–
- Source: Cricinfo, 28 May 2010

Mario Locksley Ford (born 26 June 1958) is a Bahamian former cricketer. Ford is a left-handed batsman who bowls right-arm medium pace and has represented the Bahamas national cricket team in 24 matches.

Ford made his debut for the Bahamas in the 2004 Americas Affiliates Championship against the Turks and Caicos Islands.

Ford made his Twenty20 debut for the Bahamas against the Cayman Islands in the first round of the 2006 Stanford 20/20. He scored 25 runs from 14 balls. Ford played his second and final Twenty20 match for the Bahamas in the first round of the 2008 Stanford 20/20 against Jamaica, when he scored 8 runs from 8 balls, before being dismissed by David Bernard

Ford represented the Bahamas in the 2008 ICC World Cricket League Division Five, with his final appearance for the team against Norway. Ford will represent the Bahamas in the 2010 ICC Americas Championship Division 1.
