= Kabir Khan (cricketer) =

Pakistani cricketer (born 1974)

Personal information
- Full name: Mohammad Kabir Khan
- Born: 12 April 1974 (age 52); Peshawar, Khyber Pakhtunkhwa, Pakistan
- Height: 5 ft 11 in (180 cm)
- Batting: Right-handed
- Bowling: Left-arm fast-medium
- Role: Bowler

International information
- National side: Pakistan (1994-2000)
- Test debut (cap 132): 26 August 1994 v Sri Lanka
- Last Test: 9 February 1995 v Pakistan
- ODI debut (cap 95): 11 September 1994 v Sri Lanka
- Last ODI: 27 August 2000 v South Africa

Domestic team information
- Years: Team
- 1990–2004: Peshawar
- 1993–1994: House Building Finance Corporation
- 1995–2005: Habib Bank Limited

Head coaching information
- Years: Team
- 2008–2010: Afghanistan
- 2010–2011: United Arab Emirates
- 2011–2014: Afghanistan
- 2021–2025: Saudi Arabia
- 2026–present: Kuwait Cricket

Career statistics
Competition	Test	ODI	FC	LA
Matches	4	10	114	93
Runs scored	24	10	1,459	257
Batting average	8.00	10.00	13.38	6.94
100s/50s	0/0	0/0	–/3	0/0
Top score	10	5	66*	27
Balls bowled	655	371	17,230	3,946
Wickets	9	12	437	114
Bowling average	41.11	25.25	21.18	25.14
5 wickets in innings	0	0	26	0
10 wickets in match	0	0	3	0
Best bowling	3/26	2/23	8/52	4/20
Catches/stumpings	1/–	1/–	44/–	20/–
- Source: Cricinfo, 27 May 2009

Mohammad Kabir Khan (Pashto: محمد کبير خان; born 12 April 1974) is a Pakistani cricket coach and former player. He represented the Pakistan national cricket team from 1994 to 2000 as a left-arm fast bowler, playing four Test and ten One Day International (ODI) matches.

Khan was appointed head coach of Afghanistan in 2008. He resigned in 2010 and briefly coached the United Arab Emirates, before returning to Afghanistan for a further stint from 2011 to 2014. He was appointed head coach of Saudi Arabia in 2021.

== Early life ==
Kabir Khan was born in Peshawar, Khyber Pakhtunkhwa, Pakistan in 1979. He is an ethnic Pashtun.

== Playing career ==
A seam bowler with considerable pace, Khan first played on the Sri Lankan tour of 1994–95, and made sporadic one-day appearances for the next six years. However, he never established a long-term role in the side, having only participated in ten One Day International, finding it tough to break into a Pakistan side sporting both Wasim Akram and Waqar Younis. This was despite a respectable bowling average of just over 25. Khan ended up playing 4 Test matches and 10 One Day Internationals for Pakistan.

He continued playing league cricket in the United Kingdom, including for Stirling County Cricket Club in Scotland as the club's professional.

== Coaching career ==
After retiring from first-class cricket last in 2005, Kabir became the coach of the Habib Bank Limited cricket team side and after gaining experience there, he coached the United Arab Emirates national cricket team. Khan is a highly qualified ECB Level 3 coach.

Khan was the coach of Afghanistan national cricket team and guided them from the 2008 ICC World Cricket League Division Five, through Division Four and Division Three to One Day International status during the 2009 ICC World Cup Qualifier. Shortly after Afghanistan achieved ODI status, Khan dropped Hasti Gul for their first first-class match in the ICC Intercontinental Cup match against Zimbabwe XI. This led Gul's brother Karim Sadiq to quit the national setup, citing what he called "injustices" and "wrong policies", accusing national coach Kabir Khan of not acting in the best interest of the team. Sadiq later returned to play for Afghanistan. He guided Afghanistan to victory in the 2010 ICC World Twenty20 Qualifier, which allowed them to historically qualify for the 2010 ICC World Twenty20; during the tournament Afghanistan lost both of their matches to India and South Africa.

On 19 August 2010, Khan quit as the Afghanistan coach, citing interference from officials in the Afghanistan Cricket Board during their tour to Scotland; Khan left Afghanistan top of the Intercontinental Cup and ranked 13th in the world in one-day cricket.

In October 2010, Khan was appointed head coach of the United Arab Emirates national cricket team on a three-year contract. However, he left the UAE to return for a further stint as coach of Afghanistan in December 2011. He oversaw the team's qualification for the 2012 ICC World Twenty20 and the 2015 Cricket World Cup, resigning in September 2014 for personal reasons.

Khan was appointed head coach of Saudi Arabia in 2021. He coached the team to victory at the 2023 ACC Men's Challenger Cup in Thailand.
