= Llewellyn Armstrong =

Bahamian cricketer (born 1963)

Personal information
- Full name: Llewellyn Ivan Armstrong
- Born: 15 January 1963 (age 63); Bahamas
- Batting: Right-handed
- Bowling: Right-arm slow-medium
- Relatives: Gary Armstrong (brother)

International information
- National side: Bahamas

Career statistics
Competition	Twenty20
Matches	1
Runs scored	40
Batting average	–
100s/50s	–/–
Top score	40*
Catches/stumpings	1/–
- Source: Cricinfo, 28 May 2010

Llewellyn Ivan Armstrong (born 15 January 1963) is a former Bahamian cricketer. Armstrong is a right-handed batsman who bowled right-arm slow-medium. Armstrong had represented the Bahamas national cricket team and captained them in 5 matches.

Armstrong made his debut for the Bahamas in the 2002 ICC Americas Championship against the United States. He captained the team in their three further matches in the tournament against Bermuda, the Cayman Islands and Argentina.

Armstrong made his Twenty20 debut for the Bahamas against the Cayman Islands in the 1st round of the 2006 Stanford 20/20. Armstrong captained the side and scored 40* as the Bahamas lost by 57 runs. This was Armstrong's final appearance for the Bahamas.

== Family ==
Armstrong's brother, Gary Armstrong has also played for the Bahamas.
