= Hasti Gul =

Afghan cricketer

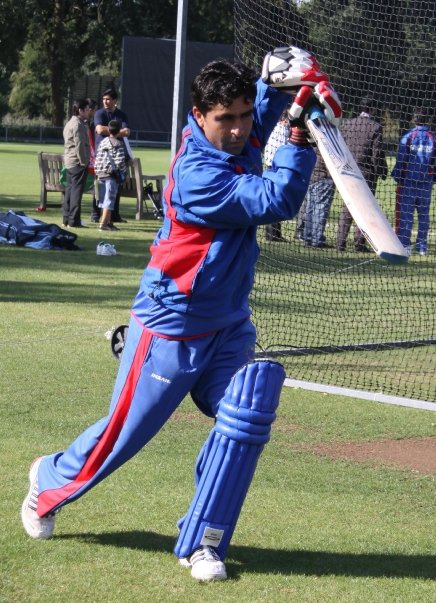

Personal information
- Full name: Hasti Gul Abid
- Born: 1 January 1984 (age 42); Nangarhar Province, Afghanistan
- Batting: Right-handed
- Bowling: Right-arm medium
- Relatives: Karim Sadiq (Brother)

International information
- National side: Afghanistan
- ODI debut (cap 4): 19 April 2009 v Scotland
- Last ODI: 1 September 2009 v Netherlands
- ODI shirt no.: 6

Domestic team information
- Years: Team
- 2007: Sebastianites Cricket and Athletic Club

Career statistics
Competition	ODI	LA
Matches	2	6
Runs scored	23	54
Batting average	–	18.00
100s/50s	–/–	–/–
Top score	23*	23*
Balls bowled	114	258
Wickets	3	6
Bowling average	24.33	32.33
5 wickets in innings	–	–
10 wickets in match	–	–
Best bowling	2/48	2/48
Catches/stumpings	–/–	–/–
- Source: Cricinfo, 17 April 2010

Hasti Gul Abid (born 1 January 1984) is an Afghan cricketer who has played for the Afghanistan national cricket team. Gul is a right-handed batsman who bowls right-arm medium pace.

Born in Nangarhar Province, Gul spent much of his early years in refugee camps with his family, fleeing the Soviet invasion of Afghanistan and the subsequent civil war that followed the Soviet withdrawal. Gul, like many of his teammates, learnt the game in neighbouring Pakistan.

He made his List-A debut playing domestic cricket for the Sebastianites Cricket and Athletic Club in Sri Lanka in 2007.

He was a part of the Afghan cricket team that from 2008 to 2009 won the World Cricket League Division Five, Division Four and Division Three, therefore being promoted to Division Two and taking part in the 2009 ICC World Cup Qualifier where they finished fifth, missing out on the 2011 Cricket World Cup, but gaining for themselves the One Day International status. Gul made his ODI debut against Scotland on 19 April 2009.

Shortly after Afghanistan achieved their ODI status, Gul was dropped by coach Kabir Khan for their ICC Intercontinental Cup match against Zimbabwe XI. This led his brother, Karim Sadiq, to quit the national setup in protest. Sadiq later returned to represent Afghanistan.

Gul's last appearance for Afghanistan came in their 2009 tour of the Netherlands, during the first One Day International which Afghanistan lost by 8 runs. In Afghan domestic cricket Gul has represented Kabul Province, and currently represents Nangarhar Province.
