= Dannavan Morrison =

Bahamian cricketer (born 1960)

Personal information
- Full name: Dannavan Morrison
- Born: 12 June 1960 (age 66)
- Batting: Right-handed

International information
- National side: Bahamas

Career statistics
Competition	T20
Matches	1
Runs scored	1
Batting average	1.00
100s/50s	–/–
Top score	1
Balls bowled	–
Wickets	–
Bowling average	–
5 wickets in innings	–
10 wickets in match	–
Best bowling	–
Catches/stumpings	–/–
- Source: Cricinfo, 28 May 2010

Dannavan Morrison (born 12 June 1960) is a former Bahamian cricketer. Morrison is a right-handed batsman who represented the Bahamas national cricket team.

Morrison made his debut for the Bahamas in the 2006 ICC Americas Championship Division 2 against PanamaBelize.

Morrison made his only Twenty20 appearance for the Bahamas against the Cayman Islands in the 1st round of the 2006 Stanford 20/20.

Morrison represented the Bahamas in the 2010 ICC World Cricket League Division Five and the 2010 ICC Americas Championship Division 2. Morrison's final match for the Bahamas came against Vanuatu.
