= Hemantha Jayasena =

Sri Lankan-born cricketer (born 1971)

Personal information
- Full name: Stanly Hemanth G Nag
- Born: 16 September 1971 (age 55); Panadura, Western Province, Dominion of Ceylon
- Batting: Left-handed
- Bowling: Leg break

International information
- National side: Italy

Domestic team information
- Years: Team
- 1990/91–1991/92: Panadura Sports Club

Career statistics
Competition	First-class	List A
Matches	8	1
Runs scored	242	10
Batting average	30.25	10.00
100s/50s	–/2	–/–
Top score	75	10
Balls bowled	60	–
Wickets	2	–
Bowling average	26.00	–
5 wickets in innings	–	–
10 wickets in match	–	–
Best bowling	1/10	–
Catches/stumpings	3/–	–/–
- Source: CricketArchive (subscription required), 16 October 2011

Hemantha G Nag Jayasena (born September 16, 1971) is a Sri Lankan-born cricketer. He is a left-handed batsman and leg-break bowler. Jayasena first played cricket back in 1990, turning out for Sri Lankan Premier League side Panadura Sports Club, though he lasted merely two years under their wing.

Six years later, Jayasena was to discover a new lease of life as a cricketer, playing for his adopted nation of Italy for the first time in 1998. He played for Italy for the first time at the 1998 European Championships, making his debut and a half-century as an opening batsman for his country against Gibraltar, as well as taking three wickets. He later played in the 2002 European Championships, and in 2004, helped Italy to promotion from Division Two into Division One, despite their slip back down the ladder two years later.

A determined batsman, he quickly made his way up from tailender to opener for Panadura, and, for Italy, commonly starts in the upper-middle order.
