= Nicholas Northcote =

Italian cricketer (born 1981)

Personal information
- Full name: Nicholas Michael Northcote
- Born: 5 January 1981 (age 45); Cape Town, Cape Province, South Africa
- Batting: Right-handed
- Role: Wicket-keeper
- Relatives: Andy Northcote (brother)

International information
- National side: Italy

Domestic team information
- Years: Team
- 2005/06: Boland

Career statistics
Competition	First-class
Matches	1
Runs scored	27
Batting average	–
100s/50s	–/–
Top score	27*
Catches/stumpings	2/–
- Source: CricketArchive (subscription required), 16 October 2011

Nicholas Northcote (born 5 January 1981) is a South African-born Italian cricketer. He is a right-handed batsman and wicket-keeper. Northcote made his international debut against the Netherlands in 2006 and has represented Italy 26 times. He played a single first-class appearance prior to playing for Italy, representing Boland against Zimbabwe Under-23s in 2005.
