= Lee Melville =

Bahamian cricketer

Personal information
- Full name: Lee F Melville
- Born: 20 May 1970 (age 56)
- Batting: Right-handed
- Bowling: Right-arm medium

International information
- National side: Bahamas

Career statistics
Competition	T20
Matches	1
Runs scored	–
Batting average	–
100s/50s	–/–
Top score	–
Balls bowled	24
Wickets	1
Bowling average	33.00
5 wickets in innings	–
10 wickets in match	–
Best bowling	1/33
Catches/stumpings	–/–
- Source: Cricinfo, 28 May 2010

Lee F Melville (born 20 May 1970) is a Bahamian cricketer. Melville is a right-handed batsman who bowls right-arm medium pace and currently represents the Bahamas national cricket team.

Prior to representing the Bahamas, Melville played for Caistor Cricket Club in England in the Lincolnshire Premier League from 2001 to 2002.

Melville made his debut for the Bahamas in the 2006 ICC Americas Championship Division 2 against Panama.

Melville made his Twenty20 debut for the Bahamas against Jamaica in the 1st round of the 2008 Stanford 20/20. Melville claimed the wicket of Shawn Findlay.

Meville represented the Bahamas in the 2010 ICC World Cricket League Division Five and the 2010 ICC Americas Championship Division 2. Melville's final match for the Bahamas came against Suriname.
