= Ralph Dellor =

English sports journalist (1948–2017)

Ralph Dellor (1948 – 1 September 2017) was an English sports writer, journalist and TV and radio commentator, primarily on cricket. He was also a cricket coach.

He began his career in 1970 with BBC local radio, and went on to work for Grandstand and Match of the Day on BBC television, as well as for Test Match Special on BBC radio. In 2000 he won the Jack Fingleton Award as cricket commentator of the year.

He was an ECB-accredited cricket coach, and coached the Norwegian national side that won the European Trophy in 2003, 2005 and 2006.

He wrote a number of books, mostly on cricket, and from 1984 to 1988 he was editor of the Cricketers' Who's Who. He was the ICC's first media consultant. He was director of cricket operations at Cricinfo from 2000 to 2003, and commentated for them on the 2000 Women's World Cup in New Zealand. He left together with Stephen Lamb to set up his own business, Sportsline Media. He was an after-dinner speaker, and also became the "Voice of Lord's" as MCC's public address announcer.

He was described as "widely liked and respected within cricket". As well as cricket, he also played golf. He was diagnosed with prostate cancer shortly before his death on 1 September 2017 at the age of 69.

== Bibliography ==
- British Golf Courses: A guide to courses & clubs in the British Isles, coauthor with Marion Willis and editor, 1974, ISBN 978-0904200065
- A Hundred Years Of The Ashes, coauthored by Doug Ibbotson and edited by David Firth, Rothmans Publications, 1982, ISBN 978-0907574033
- Funny Turn: Confessions of a Cricketing Clown, autobiography of Ray East edited by Dellor, Allen & Unwin, 1984, ISBN 978-0047960864
- Cricketers' Who's Who 1987, co-editor with Iain Sproat, Collins, 1987, ISBN 0002182629
- Copy Book Cricket, coauthor with Les Lenham, Robson Books Ltd, 1989, ISBN 978-0860514886
- How to Coach Cricket, HarperCollins Willow, 1990, ISBN 978-0002183697
- Durham: Birth of a First-class County, Bloomsbury Publishing PLC, 1992, ISBN 978-0747511793
- Winning the Ashes: The Summer a Nation Held Its Breath (Lords Taverners), The History Press, 2005, ISBN 978-0750944373
- History of Cricket, coauthor with Stephen Lamb, Sutton Publishing Ltd, 2006, ISBN 978-0750946933
- Little Book of Cricket Legends, coauthor with Stephen Lamb, Green Umbrella Publishing, 2006, ISBN 978-1905009510
- Cricket Legends Gift Pack (Gift Packs (Book and DVD)), coauthor with Stephen Lamb, Green Umbrella Publishing, 2007, ISBN 978-1905828555
- The A-Z of Cricket: A Cricketing A to Z, coauthor with Stephen Lamb, Green Umbrella Publishing, 2009, ISBN 978-1906635299
- Little Book of the Ashes, coauthor with Stephen Lamb, Green Umbrella Publishing, 2009, ISBN 978-1906635466
- Cricket: Steps to Success, Human Kinetics Europe Ltd, 2010, ISBN 978-0736078733
- Lost Voices of Cricket, coauthor with Stephen Lamb, Bene Factum Publishing Ltd, 2014, ISBN 978-1909657502
