= Karim Sadiq =

Afghan cricketer

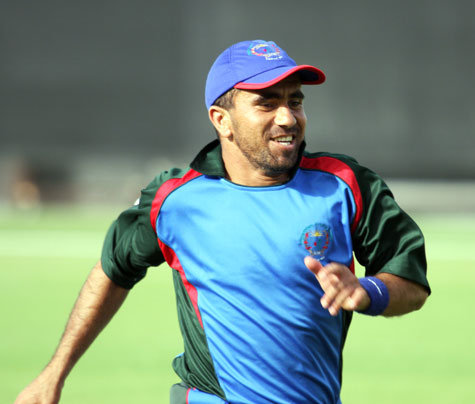

Personal information
- Full name: Karim Khan Sadiq
- Born: 28 February 1984 (age 42); Nangrahar Province, Afghanistan
- Batting: Right-handed
- Bowling: Right-arm off break
- Role: Opening batsman; Occasional wicket-keeper
- Relatives: Hasti Gul (brother)

International information
- National side: Afghanistan (2009–2018)
- ODI debut (cap 5): 19 April 2009 v Scotland
- Last ODI: 4 January 2016 v Zimbabwe
- ODI shirt no.: 84
- T20I debut (cap 4): 12 February 2012 v Ireland
- Last T20I: 6 February 2018 v Zimbabwe
- T20I shirt no.: 84 (previously 10)

Domestic team information
- Years: Team
- 2011: Afghan Cheetahs
- 2017: Boost Region
- 2017: Kabul Eagles

Career statistics
Competition	ODI	T20I	FC	LA
Matches	24	36	28	63
Runs scored	475	538	1,730	1,597
Batting average	23.75	14.94	33.92	28.01
100s/50s	2/0	0/1	3/10	2/10
Top score	114*	72	163	114*
Balls bowled	320	420	2,691	1,247
Wickets	6	14	47	39
Bowling average	33.50	34.42	35.65	31.97
5 wickets in innings	0	0	2	1
10 wickets in match	0	0	0	0
Best bowling	2/10	3/17	6/55	5/50
Catches/stumpings	6/0	6/–	24/–	15/0
Medal record
Representing Afghanistan
Men's Cricket
Asian Games
Silver medal – second place	2010 Guangzhou	Team
Silver medal – second place	2014 Incheon	Team
- Source: Cricinfo, 9 January 2021

Karim Khan Sadiq (Pashto: كريم خان صادق; born 28 February 1984) is an Afghan cricketer. He is a right-handed batsman who occasionally serves as a wicket-keeper for the Afghanistan national team. He can also bowl off break, and took 4 wickets for 27 runs against Denmark in their first match of the 2009 ICC World Cup Qualifier.

== Early career ==
Sadiq is a part of the Afghan cricket team that in under a year has won the World Cricket League Division Five, Division Four and Division Three, thus promoting them to Division Two and allowing them to partake in the 2009 ICC World Cup Qualifier's.

He was suspended for one match during the 2009 ICC World Cup Qualifier due to "inappropriate and intentional physical contact" in their defeat to the Netherlands. During the tournament he performed well with the bat, top scoring with 92, and, surprisingly for a wicketkeeper, with the ball.

== Quitting Afghanistan ==
Shortly after Afghanistan achieved ODI status, Sadiq quit the national setup as he was upset at his brother, Hasti Gul, being dropped for their ICC Intercontinental Cup match against Zimbabwe XI. Sadiq accused national coach Kabir Khan of not acting in the best interest of the team.

== Return ==
Sadiq's international retirement was short lived, as he made his first-class debut in January 2010 against Ireland, where he made scores of 19 and 1.

In February 2010, Sadiq made his Twenty20 International debut in the Sri Lanka Associates T20 Series against Ireland. Sadiq took 2/17 with the ball. Afghanistan lost the match by 5 wickets. Later, Sadiq was a key member of Afghanistan's World Twenty20 Qualifier winning team. He was later named in Afghanistan's squad for the 2010 ICC World Twenty20.

Sadiq was a key member of Afghanistan's 2010 ACC Trophy Elite winning squad, which defeated Nepal in the final by 95 runs. In final, Sadiq top-scored for Afghanistan with 58 runs. In Afghanistan's first match of the tournament, he scored 130 runs off 92 balls against Bhutan in Afghanistan's 393-run win.

He later played for the newly formed Afghan Cheetahs team in the Faysal Bank Twenty-20 Cup 2011-12. Sadiq later featured in Afghanistan's first One Day International against a Full Member Test-playing nation when they played Pakistan at Sharjah Cricket Association Stadium in February 2012. Sadiq top scored in Afghanistan's innings with 40 runs, before becoming one of Shahid Afridi's five wickets. Pakistan won the encounter by 7 wickets.

In September 2018, he was named in Kandahar's squad in the first edition of the Afghanistan Premier League tournament.
