= 2011–12 National T20 Cup =

Cricket tournament

- Dates: 25 September – 2 October 2011
- Administrator: Pakistan Cricket Board
- Cricket format: Twenty20
- Tournament format(s): Round-robin and knockout
- Host: (Pakistan) Karachi
- Champions: Sialkot Stallions (6th title)
- Participants: 14
- Matches: 21
- Player of the series: N/A
- Most runs: Yasir Hameed (218)
- Most wickets: Mohammad Rameez (10)

The 2011–12 Faysal Bank T20 Cup was the eighth season of the Faysal Bank T20 Cup in Pakistan, sponsored by Faysal Bank. The season was to begin in the final week of September in Lahore but due to an outbreak of dengue fever, the tournament was shifted to Karachi. The winning team received ₨ 2.5 million as prize money, while the runners-up received ₨ 1 million.

== Venue ==
All 21 matches of the tournament were played at National Stadium, Karachi.

City	Venue	Capacity	Matches
Karachi, Sindh	National Stadium	34,228	21
2011–12 National T20 Cup is located in Pakistan

== Squads ==
List of cricketers who represented their teams.

=== Group A ===
Abbottabad Falcons

- Younus Khan (c)
- Abdul Manan
- Adnan Raees
- Asif Afridi
- Ahmed Jamal
- Fawad Khan (wk)
- Ghulam Mohammad
- Junaid Khan
- Khalid Usman
- Khurshid Anwar
- Mir Azam
- Nabeeullah
- Rehan Afridi
- Sajjad Ali
- Sohail Akthar
- Wajid Ali
- Yasir Hameed
- Yasir Shah

Karachi Zebras

- Faisal Iqbal (c)
- Adnan Baig (wk)
- Akbar-ur-Rehman
- Anwar Ali
- Asif Zakir
- Atif Maqbool
- Azam Hussain
- Danish Kaneria
- Farhan Iqbal
- Hasan Raza
- Khurram Manzoor
- Mohammad Waqas
- Rameez Aziz
- Sheharyar Ghani
- Tabish Khan
- Tahir Khan
- Uzair-ul-Haq
- Wajihuddin

Lahore Eagles

- Imran Farhat (c)
- Abid Ali
- Adnan Akmal
- Ali Azmat
- Asif Ashfaq
- Asif Raza
- Azhar Ali
- Emmad Ali
- Hamza Paracha
- Junaid Zia
- Kamran Sajid
- Kashif Mahmood
- Mohammad Hamza
- Mustafa Iqbal
- Saad Nasim
- Taufeeq Umar
- Waqas Aslam
- Wasif Butt

Quetta Bears

- Bismillah Khan (c/wk)
- Abid Ali
- Arun Lal
- Faizullah
- Fareed-ud-din
- Gul Mohammad
- Imran Khan
- Matiullah Khan
- Mir Wais
- Mohammad Asif
- Mohammad Zahir
- Mohibullah
- Munir Ahmed
- Nasrullah Khan
- Saeed Khan
- Sher Hasan
- Taimur Khan
- Taimur Siddiq

=== Group B ===
(Afghanistan) Afghan Cheetahs

- Mohammad Nabi (c)
- Abdullah
- Fazal Niyazai
- Gulbudeen Naib
- Hamid Hassan
- Karim Sadiq
- Mohammad Sami
- Najibullah Zadran
- Najib Taraki
- Nasim Khan
- Qasim Khan
- Samiullah Shenwari
- Sayed Shirzad
- Yamin Ahmadzai
- Abdullah Adil
- Abdur Mangal
- Afsar Zazai
- Nawab Khan
- Rahmat Shah

Faisalabad Wolves

- Misbah-ul-Haq (c)
- Abdur Rauf
- Asad Ali
- Asif Ali
- Asif Hussain
- Imran Khalid
- Jahandad Khan
- Khurram Shehzad
- Mohammad Hafeez
- Mohammad Salman (wk)
- Mohammad Shahid
- Mohammad Talha
- Naved Latif
- Sabir Hussain
- Saeed Ajmal
- Shahid Muzaffar (wk)
- Shahid Nazir
- Waqas Maqsood

Multan Tigers

- Shabbir Ahmed (c)
- Ansar Javed
- Bilal Khilji (wk)
- Faisal Elahi
- Gulraiz Sadaf
- Haziq Habibullah
- Kamran Hussain
- Mohammad Irfan
- Mohammad Irshad
- Mohammad Sami
- Mohammad Zahid
- Moinuddin
- Naved Yasin
- Taimur Ahmed
- Zain Abbas
- Zulfiqar Babar

Rawalpindi Rams

- Sohail Tanvir (c)
- Adil Zarif
- Adnan Mufti
- Awais Zia
- Babar Naeem
- Hammad Azam
- Jamal Anwar (wk)
- Mohammad Nawaz
- Mohammad Rameez
- Mohammad Saleem
- Nasir Malik
- Naved Malik
- Sadaf Hussain
- Samiullah
- Tahir Mughal
- Umar Amin
- Yasim Murtaza
- Zahid Mansoor

=== Group C ===
Hyderabad Hawks

- Azeem Ghumman (c)
- Aqeel Anjum
- Faisal Athar
- Ghulam Yasin
- Jamshed Baig
- Kashif Pervez
- Lal Kumar
- Mansoor Malik
- Mir Ali
- Naeem-ur-Rehman
- Nasir Awais
- Nauman Ali
- Rizwan Ahmed
- Shahid Qambrani
- Shahzad Haider
- Sharjeel Khan
- Suleman Baloch
- Zahid Mahmood

Lahore Lions

- Abdul Razzaq (c)
- Aamer Hayat
- Adnan Rasool
- Ahmed Shehzad
- Aizaz Cheema
- Asif Yousuf
- Imran Ali
- Jahangir Mirza
- Jamshed Ahmed
- Kamran Akmal (wk)
- Muzaffar Mahboob
- Nasir Jamshed
- Raza Ali Dar
- Sohail Ahmed
- Tanzeel Altaf
- Umar Akmal
- Usman Malik
- Wahab Riaz

Sialkot Stallions

- Shoaib Malik (c)
- Abdur Rehman
- Ali Khan
- Faisal Naved
- Haris Sohail
- Imran Nazir
- Kamran Younis
- Mansoor Amjad
- Mohammad Ayub
- Rana Naved-ul-Hasan
- Naved Arif
- Qaiser Abbas
- Raza Hasan
- Rizwan Sultan
- Sarfraz Ahmed
- Shahid Yousuf
- Shakeel Ansar (wk)
- Yasir Aziz

=== Group D ===
Karachi Dolphins

- Shahid Afridi (c)
- Asad Shafiq
- Ashraf Ali
- Faraz Ahmed
- Fawad Alam
- Fazal Subhan
- Haaris Ayaz
- Javed Mansoor
- Khalid Latif
- Misbah Khan
- Mohammad Sami
- Rameez Raja
- Rumman Raees
- Sarfraz Ahmed (wk)
- Shahzaib Hasan
- Sohail Khan
- Tanvir Ahmed
- Tariq Haroon

Islamabad Leopards

- Iftikhar Anjum (c)
- Adnan Ijaz
- Afaq Raheem
- Ashar Zaidi
- Imad Wasim
- Junaid Nadir
- Kamran Hussain
- Moed Ahmed
- Naeem Anjum (wk)
- Nasrullah Khan
- Nauman Masood
- Raheel Majeed
- Rizwan Malik
- Sajid Ali
- Sarmad Bhatti
- Shan Masood
- Umair Khan
- Zohaib Ahmed

Peshawar Panthers

- Umar Gul (c)
- Aftab Alam
- Akbar Badshah
- Fawad Ali
- Gauhar Ali (wk)
- Iftikhar Ahmed
- Israrullah
- Jamaluddin
- Khadim Jan
- Mohammad Fayyaz
- Musadiq Ahmed
- Nasir Ahmed
- Nauman Habib
- Nawaz Ahmed
- Noor-ul-Amin
- Rafatullah Mohmand
- Shoaib Khan
- Zohaib Khan

== Results ==
=== Teams and standings ===
The top team from each group qualified for the semi-finals. The top two teams from each group qualify for the 2012 Faysal Bank Super Eight T20 Cup.

Group A
Team	Pld	W	L	NR	Pts	NRR
Lahore Eagles	3	3	0	0	6	+0.773
Karachi Zebras	3	2	1	0	4	+0.55
Abbottabad Falcons	3	1	2	0	2	+1.234
Quetta Bears	3	0	3	0	0	−2.558

Group B
Team	Pld	W	L	NR	Pts	NRR
Rawalpindi Rams	3	3	0	0	6	+4.950
Faisalabad Wolves	3	2	1	0	4	+1.000
Multan Tigers	3	1	2	0	2	−0.945
Afghan Cheetahs	3	0	3	0	0	−0.533

Group C
Team	Pld	W	L	NR	Pts	NRR
Sialkot Stallions	2	2	0	0	4	+0.674
Lahore Lions	2	1	1	0	2	+1.703
Hyderabad Hawks	2	0	2	0	0	−1.920

Group D
Team	Pld	W	L	NR	Pts	NRR
Peshawar Panthers	2	2	0	0	4	+1.339
Karachi Dolphins	2	1	1	0	2	+0.658
Islamabad Leopards	2	0	2	0	0	−2.012

Qualified for semifinals

=== Knockout stage ===
Semifinals
A1	Lahore Eagles	167
C1	Sialkot Stallions	171/4
B1	Rawalpindi Rams	168
D1	Peshawar Panthers	91

Finals
C1	Sialkot Stallions	180/6
B1	Rawalpindi Rams	170/8

== Fixtures ==
=== Group stage ===
==== Group A ====
25 September
12:00
Scorecard

Abbottabad Falcons; 190/2 (20 overs)	v	Quetta Bears; 118/8 (20 overs)
Yasir Hameed 101 (65); Sher Hasan 1/33 (4 overs)		Abid Ali 42 (46); Junaid Khan 3/24 (4 overs)

Abbottabad Falcons won by 72 runs
National Stadium, Karachi
Umpires: Masood Khan and Nadeem Ghauri
Player of the match: Junaid Khan

- Quetta Bears won the toss and chose to field
- Matiullah Khan, Mohibullah and Sher Hasan (Quetta Bears) all made their T20 debuts.

25 September
20:00 (D/N)
Scorecard

Lahore Eagles; 143/6 (20 overs)	v	Karachi Zebras; 141/7 (20 overs)
Ali Azmat 36* (37); Danish Kaneria 2/26 (4 overs)		Hasan Raza 49 (54); Saad Nasim 2/32 (4 overs)

Lahore Eagles won by 2 runs
National Stadium, Karachi
Umpires: Kaukab Butt and Tahir Shah
Player of the match: Hasan Raza

- Lahore Eagles won the toss and chose to bat
- Rameez Aziz (Karachi Zebras); Hamza Paracha and Mustafa Iqbal (Lahore Eagles) all made their T20 debuts.

26 September
16:00 (D/N)
Scorecard

Karachi Zebras; 172/5 (20 overs)	v	Quetta Bears; 128 (18.3 overs)
Khurram Manzoor 62 (52); Arun Lal 2/53 (4 overs)		Fareed-ud-din 24 (18); Danish Kaneria 3/23 (3.3 overs)

Karachi Zebras won by 45 runs
National Stadium, Karachi
Umpires: Ijaz Ahmed and Nadeem Ghauri
Player of the match: Khurram Manzoor

- Karachi Zebras won the toss and chose to bat

26 September
20:00 (D/N)
Scorecard

Lahore Eagles; 150/4 (20 overs)	v	Abbottabad Falcons; 135 (19.3 overs)
Imran Farhat 43 (31); Wajid Ali 2/7 (2 overs)		Yasir Hameed 44 (42); Junaid Zia 2/9 (3.3 overs)

Lahore Eagles won by 15 runs
National Stadium, Karachi
Umpires: Akbar Khan and Shakeel Khan
Player of the match: Taufeeq Umar

- Lahore Eagles won the toss and chose to bat
- Waqas Aslam (Lahore Eagles) made his T20 debut.

27 September
12:00
Scorecard

Lahore Eagles; 129/1 (16.1 overs)	v	Quetta Bears; 125 (20 overs)
Imran Farhat 50 (33); Abid Ali 1/21 (3 overs)		Mir Wais 30 (36); Junaid Zia 2/17 (4 overs)

Lahore Eagles won by 9 wickets
National Stadium, Karachi
Umpires: Riazuddin and Shakeel Khan
Player of the match: Imran Farhat

- Quetta Bears won the toss and chose to bat
- Gul Mohammad and Mohammad Asif (Quetta Bears) both made their T20 debuts.

27 September
16:00 (D/N)
Scorecard

Karachi Zebras; 160/4 (20 overs)	v	Abbottabad Falcons; 158/7 (20 overs)
Hasan Raza 74 (50); Khalid Usman 2/33 (4 overs)		Yasir Hameed 73 (51); Danish Kaneria 3/30 (4 overs)

Karachi Zebras won by 6 wickets
National Stadium, Karachi
Umpires: Ahmed Shahab and Nadeem Ghauri

- Abbottabad Falcons won the toss and chose to bat

==== Group B ====
28 September
16:00 (D/N)
Scorecard

Faisalabad Wolves; 161/7 (20 overs)	v	Multan Tigers; 107/9 (20 overs)
Asif Ali 44 (35); Kamran Hussain 2/21 (4 overs)		Gulraiz Sadaf 32 (31); Saeed Ajmal 3/5 (4 overs)

Faisalabad Wolves won by 54 runs
National Stadium, Karachi
Umpires: Ahsan Raza and Shozab Raza
Player of the match: Saeed Ajmal

- Faisalabad Wolves won the toss and chose to bat
- Waqas Maqsood (Faisalabad Wolves); Mohammad Sami, Mohammad Zahid and Moinuddin (Multan Tigers) all made their T20 debuts.

28 September
20:00 (D/N)
Scorecard

Rawalpindi Rams; 163/6 (18.5 overs)	v	Afghan Cheetahs; 162/4 (20 overs)
Awais Zia 60 (41); Karim Sadiq 1/17 (4 overs)		Samiullah Shenwari 52 (32); Mohammad Rameez 2/41 (4 overs)

Rawalpindi Rams won by 4 wickets
National Stadium, Karachi
Umpires: Iqbal Butt and Shakeel Khan
Player of the match: Awais Zia

- Afghan Cheetahs won the toss and chose to bat
- Abdullah Mazari, Najeeb Tarakai, Najibullah Zadran, Qaseem Khan, Sami Agha and Sayed Shirzad (Afghan Cheetas) all made their T20 debuts.

29 September
12:00
Scorecard

Rawalpindi Rams; 152/5 (18.4 overs)	v	Multan Tigers; 151/9 (20 overs)
Awais Zia 52 (30); Mohammad Zahid 2/30 (4 overs)		Ansar Javed 35* (26); Mohammad Rameez 4/24 (4 overs)

Rawalpindi Rams won by 5 wickets
National Stadium, Karachi
Umpires: Nadeem Ghauri and Tahir Shah
Player of the match: Shahbaz Ahmed

- Multan Tigers won the toss and chose to bat
- Shahbaz Ahmed (Multan Tigers) made his T20 debut.

29 September
16:00 (D/N)
Scorecard

Faisalabad Wolves; 145/8 (20 overs)	v	Afghan Cheetahs; 132/9 (20 overs)
Mohammad Salman 32 (26); Mohammad Nabi 2/24 (4 overs)		Gulbudeen Naib 68 (42); Abdur Rauf 2/25 (3 overs)

Faisalabad Wolves won by 13 runs
National Stadium, Karachi
Umpires: Shozab Raza and Zameer Haider
Player of the match: Gulbudeen Naib

- Faisalabad Wolves won the toss and chose to bat
- Fazal Niazai and Mohammad Nasim Baras (Afghan Cheetas) both made their T20 debuts.

30 September
12:00
Scorecard

Afghan Cheetahs; 131/9 (20 overs)	v	Multan Tigers; 135/6 (19.2 overs)
Najib Taraki 34 (24); Naved Yasin 4/17 (4 overs)		Zain Abbas 54 (35); Mohammad Nabi 2/32 (4 overs)

Multan Tigers won by 4 wickets
National Stadium, Karachi
Umpires: Riazuddin and Saleem Badar
Player of the match: Naved Yasin

- Afghan Cheetahs won the toss and chose to bat
- Yamin Ahmadzai (Afghan Cheetas) made his T20 debut.

30 September
16:00 (D/N)
Scorecard

Rawalpindi Rams; 165/8 (20 overs)	v	Faisalabad Wolves; 158/7 (20 overs)
Umar Amin 53 (37); Saeed Ajmal 3/32 (4 overs)		Imran Khalid 48 (35); Sohail Tanvir 2/23 (4 overs)

Rawalpindi Rams won by 7 runs
National Stadium, Karachi
Umpires: Ahsan Raza and Shakeel Khan
Player of the match: Umar Amin

- Rawalpindi Rams won the toss and chose to bat
- Sabir Hussain (Faisalabad Wolves) made his T20 debut.

==== Group C ====
25 September
20:00 (D/N)
Scorecard

Lahore Lions; 194/5 (20 overs)	v	Hyderabad Hawks; 112 (18.4 overs)
Ahmed Shehzad 72 (50); Nasir Awais 3/43 (4 overs)		Sharjeel Khan 30 (23); Raza Ali Dar 2/9 (3 overs)

Lahore Lions won by 74 runs
National Stadium, Karachi
Umpires: Hakeem Shah and Khalid Mahmood

- Hyderabad Hawks won the toss and chose to field
- Tanzeel Altaf (Lahore Lions) made his T20 debut.

26 September
12:00
Scorecard

Sialkot Stallions; 98/1 (16.4 overs)	v	Hyderabad Hawks; 96/8 (20 overs)
Shoaib Malik 50 (52); Nasir Awais 1/16 (2.4 overs)		Shahzad Haider 42 (43); Sarfraz Ahmed 4/13 (4 overs)

Sialkot Stallions won by 9 wickets
National Stadium, Karachi
Umpires: Anis-ur-Rehman and Rasheed Bhatti
Player of the match: Sarfraz Ahmed

- Hyderabad Hawks won the toss and chose to bat
- Shahzad Haider (Hyderabad Hawks) made his T20 debut.

27 September
20:00 (D/N)
Scorecard

Lahore Lions; 121 (19.4 overs)	v	Sialkot Stallions; 124/4 (19.1 overs)
Abdul Razzaq 42 (33); Naved-ul-Hasan 3/30 (4 overs)		Shahid Yousuf 47 (52); Raza Ali Dar 1/13 (4 overs)

Sialkot Stallions won by 6 wickets
National Stadium, Karachi
Umpires: Islam Khan and Saleem Badar
Player of the match: Shahid Yousuf

- Lahore Lions won the toss and chose to bat

==== Group D ====
28 September
12:00
Scorecard

Islamabad Leopards; 122 (19.3 overs)	v	Peshawar Panthers; 150/9 (20 overs)
Naeem Anjum 40 (41); Nauman Habib 4/17 (3.3 overs)		Aftab Alam 36 (33); Zohaib Ahmed 3/21 (4 overs)

Peshawar Panthers won by 28 runs
National Stadium, Karachi
Umpires: Ghaffar Kazmi and Zameer Haider
Player of the match: Umar Gul

- Islamabad Leopards won the toss and chose to field
- Junaid Nadir, Sajid Ali (Islamabad Leopards) and Nauman Habib (Peshawar Panthers) all made their T20 debuts.

29 September
20:00 (D/N)
Scorecard

Karachi Dolphins; 132/2 (13.3 overs)	v	Islamabad Leopards; 131/9 (20 overs)
Shahid Afridi 58 (32); Rizwan Malik 1/27 (3 overs)		Afaq Raheem 22 (15); Shahid Afridi 3/20 (4 overs)

Karachi Dolphins won by 8 wickets
National Stadium, Karachi
Umpires: Ahmed Shahab and Ghaffar Kazmi
Player of the match: Shahid Afridi

- Islamabad Leopards won the toss and chose to bat
- Moed Ahmed, Rizwan Malik and Sarmad Bhatti (Islamabad Leopards) all made their T20 debuts.

30 September
20:00 (D/N)
Scorecard

Karachi Dolphins; 148/9 (20 overs)	v	Peshawar Panthers; 177/7 (20 overs)
Sarfraz Ahmed 37 (20); Nauman Habib 3/27 (4 overs)		Zohaib Khan 43* (23); Faraz Ahmed 2/27 (4 overs)

Peshawar Panthers won by 29 runs
National Stadium, Karachi
Umpires: Ehtesham-ul-Haq and Shozab Raza
Player of the match: Zohaib Khan

- Peshawar Panthers won the toss and chose to bat
- Rumman Raees (Karachi Dolphins) and Nasir Ahmed (Peshawar Panthers) both made their T20 debuts.

=== Knockout stage ===
Semi-finals

1 October
16:00 (D/N)
Scorecard

Lahore Eagles; 167 (19.3 overs)	v	Sialkot Stallions; 171/4 (18.5 overs)
Imran Farhat 73 (44); Rana Naved-ul-Hasan 2/23 (4 overs)		Shoaib Malik 88* (79); Junaid Zia 3/23 (4 overs)

Sialkot Stallions won by 6 wickets
National Stadium, Karachi
Umpires: Riazuddin and Zameer Haider
Player of the match: Shoaib Malik (Sialkot Stallions)

- Lahore Eagles won the toss and chose to bat

1 October
20:00 (D/N)
Scorecard

Rawalpindi Rams; 168(19.5 overs)	v	Peshawar Panthers; 91 (16 overs)
Umar Amin 30 (26); Zohaib Khan 3/36 (4 overs)		Rafatullah Mohmand 33 (26); Umar Amin 3/14 (4 overs)

Rawalpindi Rams won by 77 runs
National Stadium, Karachi
Umpires: Ahsan Raza and Saleem Badar
Player of the match: Umar Amin (Rawalpindi Rams)

- Rawalpindi Rams won the toss and elected bat

Final

2 October
19:00 (D/N)
Scorecard

Sialkot Stallions; 180/6 (20 overs)	v	Rawalpindi Rams; 170/8 (20 overs)
Qaiser Abbas 44 (34); Awais Zia 2/17 (2 overs)		Naved Malik 67 (47); Raza Hasan 2/11 (4 overs)

Sialkot Stallions won by 10 runs
National Stadium, Karachi
Umpires: Aleem Dar and Asad Rauf
Player of the match: Raza Hasan (Sialkot Stallions)

- Sialkot Stallions won the toss and elected to bat

== Statistics ==
Leading run scorers
Runs	Player	Team	Matches
218	Yasir Hameed	Abbottabad Falcons	3
193	Imran Farhat	Lahore Eagles	4
153	Shoaib Malik	Sialkot Stallions	3
152	Taufeeq Umar	Lahore Eagles	4
147	Umar Amin	Rawalpindi Rams	4
145	Awais Zia	Rawalpindi Rams	4

Leading wicket takers
Wickets	Player	Team	Matches
10	Mohammad Rameez	Rawalpindi Rams	4
9	Nauman Habib	Peshawar Panthers	3
8	Junaid Zia	Lahore Eagles	4
8	Danish Kaneria	Karachi Zebras	3
7	Saeed Ajmal	Faisalabad Wolves	3
6	Raza Hasan	Sialkot Stallions	3

=== Highest team totals ===
The following table lists the highest team scores during this season.

Team	Total	Opponent	Ground
Lahore Lions	194/5	Hyderabad Hawks	National Stadium, Karachi
Abbottabad Falcons	190/2	Quetta Bears	National Stadium, Karachi
Peshawar Panthers	177/7	Karachi Dolphins	National Stadium, Karachi
Karachi Zebras	172/5	Quetta Bears	National Stadium, Karachi

== Broadcasting rights ==
All matches were taken place at the National Stadium, Karachi and all matches were telecasted live on GEO Super.
