= Mudassar =

Mudassar, Mudassir, Modasser, or Mudasiru are masculine given names and surnames of Arabic origin. Notable people with the name include:

== Given name ==
- Muddathir Abdel-Rahim (born 1932), Sudanese political scientist, diplomat, and academic
- Syed Modasser Ali, Bangladeshi surgeon and politician
- Mudasir Ali (born 1987), Indian composer
- Mudassar Asghar (born 1947), Pakistani field hockey player
- Mudassar Aziz (born 1980), Indian film director
- Mudassar Baig (born 1979), Pakistani para-athlete
- Mudassar Bukhari (born 1983), Dutch cricketer
- Mudassar Kapur (born 1976), Norwegian politician
- Mudassar Khan (born 1987), Indian dancer and film choreographer
- Mudassar Ali Khan (born 1979), Pakistani field hockey player
- Mudassir Ibrahim, Nigerian politician
- Mudashiru Lawal (1954–1991), Nigerian professional footballer
- Mudassar Muhammad (born 1981), German cricketer
- Mudassar Naaru (missing since 2018), Pakistani journalist, poet and blogger
- Mudassar Nazar (born 1956), Pakistani cricketer
- Mudashiru Obasa (born 1972), Nigerian lawyer and politician
- Mudassar Riaz (born 1995), Pakistani cricketer
- Mudaser Sadat (born 2007), German professional footballer
- Mudassir Hossain, Indian politician
- Mudasiru Oyetunde Hussein, Nigerian politician
- Mudasir Zafar (born 1986), Indian actor
- Modaser Zekria (born 1990), Afghan international footballer

== Surname ==
- Ali Mudassar (born 1989), Pakistani cricketer
- Baabarr Mudacer (born 1995), Indian rapper
- Gbolahan Mudasiru (1945–2003), Nigerian Air Force officer and governor of Lagos State, Nigeria
- Ghulam Mudassar (born 1999), Pakistani cricketer
- J. R. Mudassir Husain (born 1940), Bangladeshi jurist and 14th Chief Justice of Bangladesh
- Mohammad Muddassir (born 1992), Indian cricketer
- Salifu Mudasiru (born 1997), Ghanaian professional footballer
- Yasmin Modassir (1953–2016), Indian academician, scientist and former principal

== See also ==
- Mudassir and Brothers, Nigerian multinational industrial conglomerate and fashion fabric company
