= 2012 World Twenty20 squads =

This is a list of the squads picked for the 2012 ICC World Twenty20.

== Group A ==
=== Afghanistan ===
Coach: (Pakistan) Kabir Khan

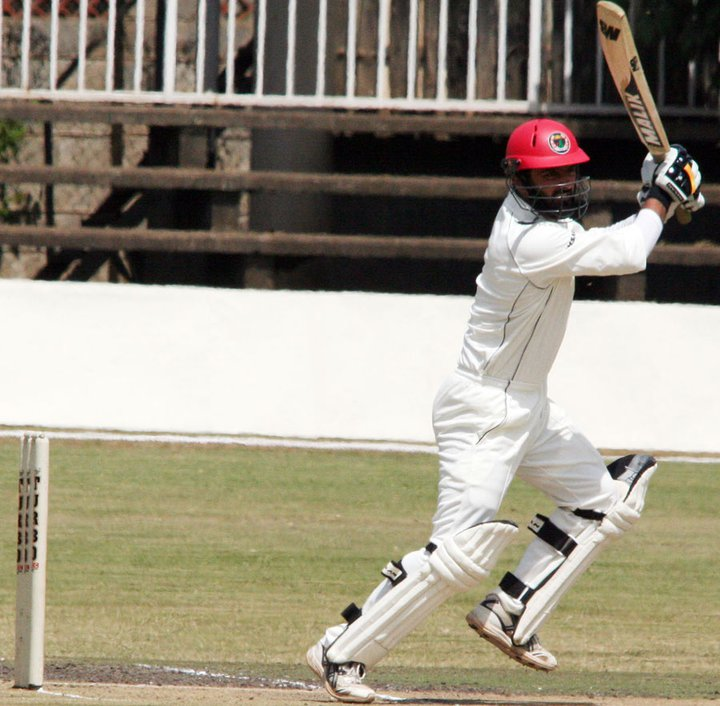
Nawroz Mangal, Afghanistan's captain for the tournament.

No.	Player	Date of birth	T20Is	Batting	Bowling style	Twenty20 team
48	Nawroz Mangal (c)	15 July 1984 (aged 28)	11	Right	Right-arm off break	(Afghanistan) Afghan Cheetahs
10	Karim Sadiq (vc & wk)	5 January 1984 (aged 28)	11	Right	Right-arm off break	(Afghanistan) Afghan Cheetahs
14	Javed Ahmadi	2 January 1992 (aged 20)	2	Right	Right-arm off break	(Afghanistan) Afghan Cheetahs
–	Mohammad Nasim Baras	30 May 1993 (aged 19)	0	Left	Slow left-arm orthodox	(Afghanistan) Afghan Cheetahs
–	Izatullah Dawlatzai	10 May 1991 (aged 21)	3	Right	Right-arm fast-medium	(Afghanistan) Afghan Cheetahs
66	Hamid Hassan	1 June 1987 (aged 25)	8	Right	Right-arm fast	(Afghanistan) Afghan Cheetahs
7	Mohammad Nabi	4 June 1991 (aged 21)	11	Right	Right-arm off break	(Afghanistan) Afghan Cheetahs
–	Gulbodin Naib	4 June 1991 (aged 21)	3	Right	Right-arm medium-fast	(Afghanistan) Afghan Cheetahs
–	Shafiqullah (wk)	7 August 1989 (aged 23)	5	Right	–	(Afghanistan) Afghan Cheetahs
1	Mohammad Shahzad (wk)	31 January 1988 (aged 24)	11	Right	–	(Afghanistan) Afghan Cheetahs
45	Samiullah Shenwari	3 February 1987 (aged 25)	11	Right	Right-arm leg break	(Afghanistan) Afghan Cheetahs
44	Asghar Afghan	22 December 1987 (aged 24)	4	Right	Right-arm medium-fast	(Afghanistan) Afghan Cheetahs
16	Dawlat Zadran	19 March 1988 (aged 24)	3	Right	Right-arm fast-medium	(Afghanistan) Afghan Cheetahs
–	Najibullah Zadran	28 February 1993 (aged 19)	0	Left	Right-arm off break	(Afghanistan) Afghan Cheetahs
20	Shapoor Zadran	8 July 1987 (aged 25)	8	Left	Left-arm fast-medium	(Afghanistan) Afghan Cheetahs

=== England ===
Coach: (Zimbabwe) Andy Flower

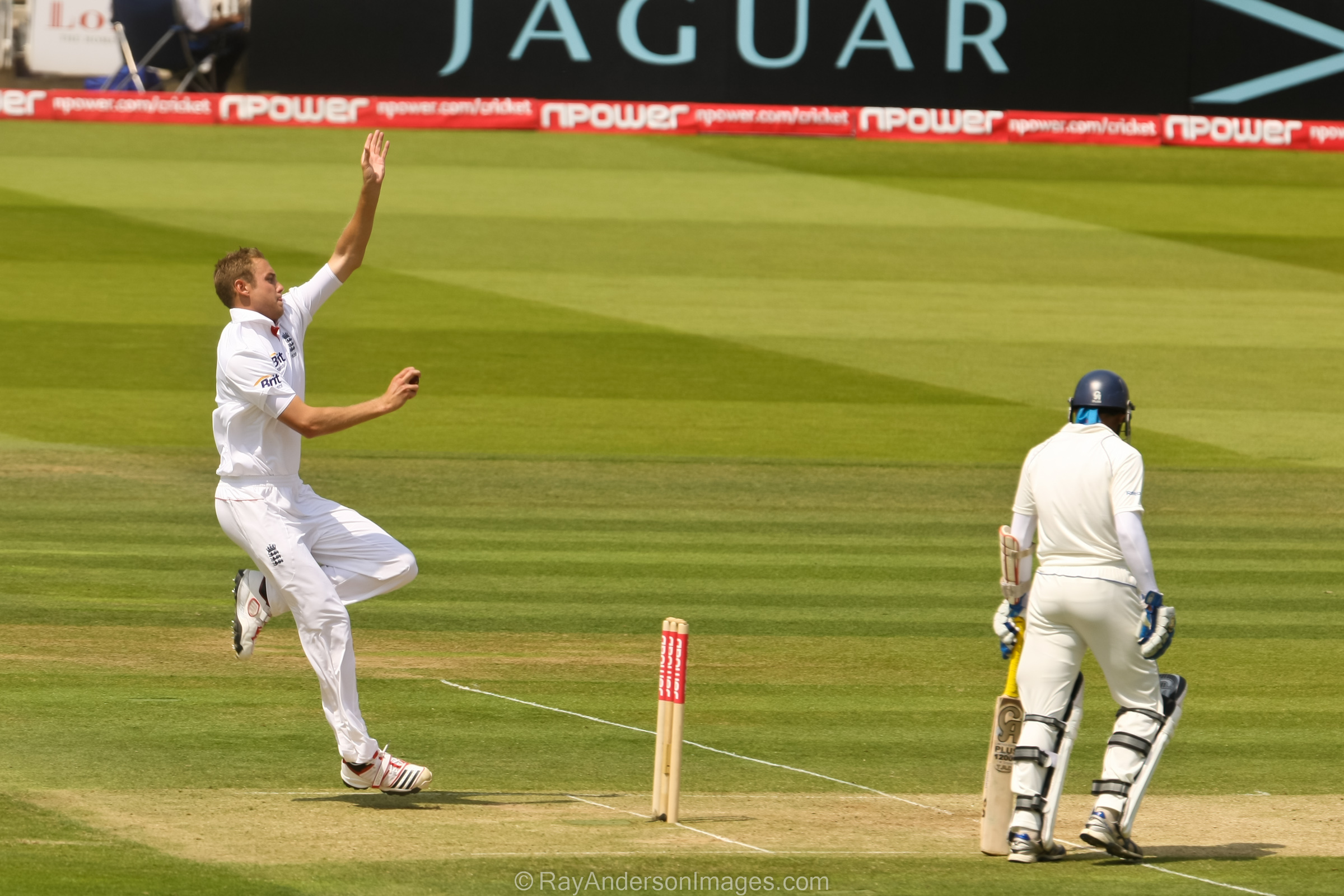
Stuart Broad (bowling), England's captain for the tournament.

No.	Player	Date of birth	T20Is	Batting	Bowling style	Twenty20 team
8	Stuart Broad (c)	24 June 1986 (aged 26)	38	Left	Right-arm fast-medium	(England) Nottinghamshire Outlaws
51	Jonny Bairstow (wk)	26 September 1989 (aged 22)	10	Right	Right-arm bowler	(England) Yorkshire Carnegie
42	Ravi Bopara	4 May 1985 (aged 27)	21	Right	Right-arm medium	(England) Essex Eagles
20	Tim Bresnan	28 February 1985 (aged 27)	21	Right	Right-arm medium-fast	(England) Yorkshire Carnegie
54	Danny Briggs	30 April 1991 (aged 21)	1	Right	Slow left-arm orthodox	(England) Hampshire Royals
63	Jos Buttler	8 September 1990 (aged 22)	11	Right	–	(England) Somerset
46	Jade Dernbach	3 April 1986 (aged 26)	12	Right	Right-arm fast-medium	(England) Surrey Lions
25	Steven Finn	4 April 1989 (aged 23)	8	Right	Right-arm fast-medium	(England) Middlesex Panthers
35	Alex Hales	3 January 1989 (aged 23)	7	Right	Right-arm medium	(England) Nottinghamshire Outlaws
22	Craig Kieswetter (wk)	28 November 1987 (aged 24)	21	Right	Right-arm slow	(England) Somerset
45	Michael Lumb	12 February 1980 (aged 32)	9	Left	Right-arm medium	(England) Nottinghamshire Outlaws
16	Eoin Morgan	10 September 1986 (aged 26)	25	Left	Right-arm medium	(England) Middlesex Panthers
29	Samit Patel	30 November 1984 (aged 27)	11	Right	Slow left-arm orthodox	(England) Nottinghamshire Outlaws
66	Graeme Swann	24 March 1979 (aged 33)	34	Right	Right-arm off break	(England) Nottinghamshire Outlaws
6	Luke Wright	7 March 1985 (aged 27)	32	Right	Right-arm medium-fast	(England) Sussex Sharks

=== India ===
Coach: (Zimbabwe) Duncan Fletcher

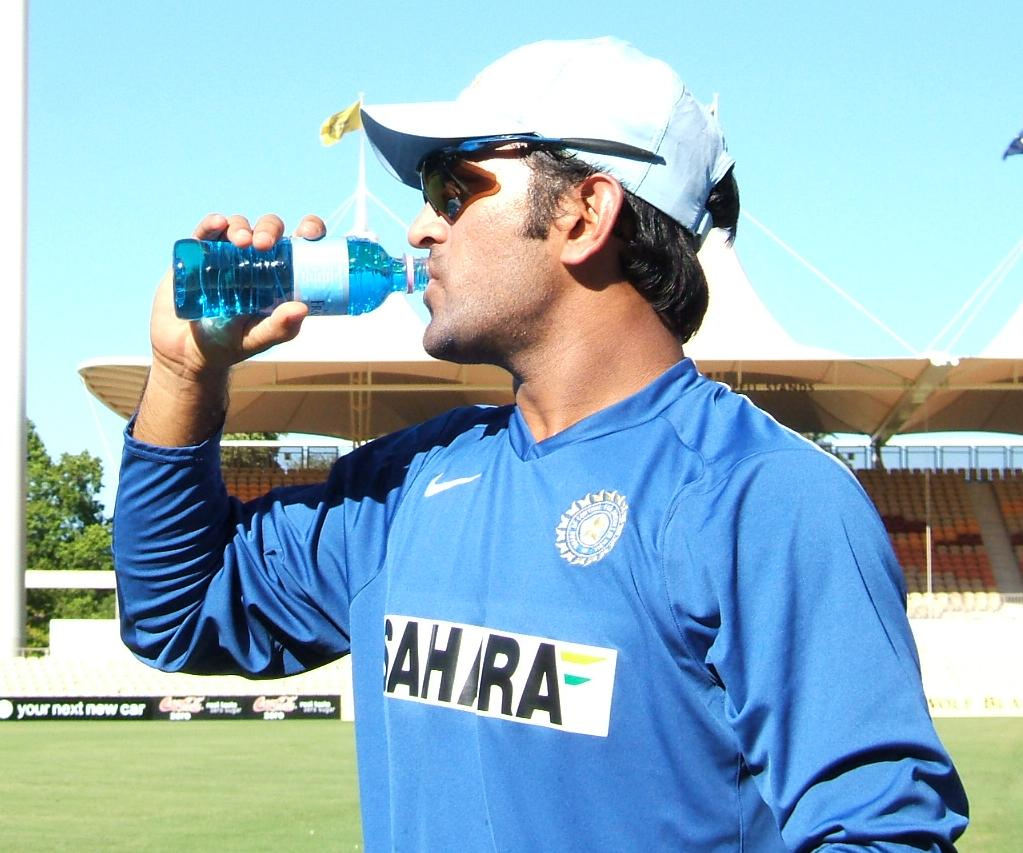
Mahendra Singh Dhoni, India's captain for the tournament.

No.	Player	Date of birth	T20Is	Batting	Bowling style	IPL team
7	Mahendra Singh Dhoni (c & wk)	7 July 1981 (aged 31)	32	Right	Right-arm medium	(India) Chennai Super Kings
5	Gautam Gambhir (vc)	14 October 1981 (aged 30)	27	Left	Right-arm leg break	(India) Kolkata Knight Riders
99	Ravichandran Ashwin	17 September 1986 (aged 26)	10	Right	Right-arm off break	(India) Chennai Super Kings
55	Lakshmipathy Balaji	27 September 1981 (aged 30)	0	Right	Right-arm medium-fast	(India) Kolkata Knight Riders
11	Piyush Chawla	24 December 1988 (aged 23)	3	Left	Right-arm leg break	(India) Kings XI Punjab
2	Ashok Dinda	25 March 1984 (aged 28)	4	Right	Right-arm medium-fast	Pune Warriors India
34	Zaheer Khan	7 October 1978 (aged 33)	12	Right	Left-arm fast-medium	(India) Royal Challengers Bangalore
18	Virat Kohli	5 November 1988 (aged 23)	10	Right	Right-arm medium	(India) Royal Challengers Bangalore
56	Irfan Pathan	27 October 1984 (aged 27)	18	Left	Left-arm medium-fast	(India) Delhi Daredevils
48	Suresh Raina	27 November 1986 (aged 25)	26	Left	Right-arm off break	(India) Chennai Super Kings
**	Virender Sehwag	20 October 1978 (aged 33)	16	Right	Right-arm off break	(India) Delhi Daredevils
77	Rohit Sharma	30 April 1987 (aged 25)	26	Right	Right-arm off break	(India) Mumbai Indians
3	Harbhajan Singh	3 July 1980 (aged 32)	23	Right	Right-arm off break	(India) Mumbai Indians
12	Yuvraj Singh	12 December 1981 (aged 30)	23	Left	Slow left-arm orthodox	Pune Warriors India
9	Manoj Tiwary	14 November 1985 (aged 26)	2	Right	Legbreak googly	(India) Kolkata Knight Riders

== Group B ==
=== Australia ===
Coach: (South Africa) Mickey Arthur

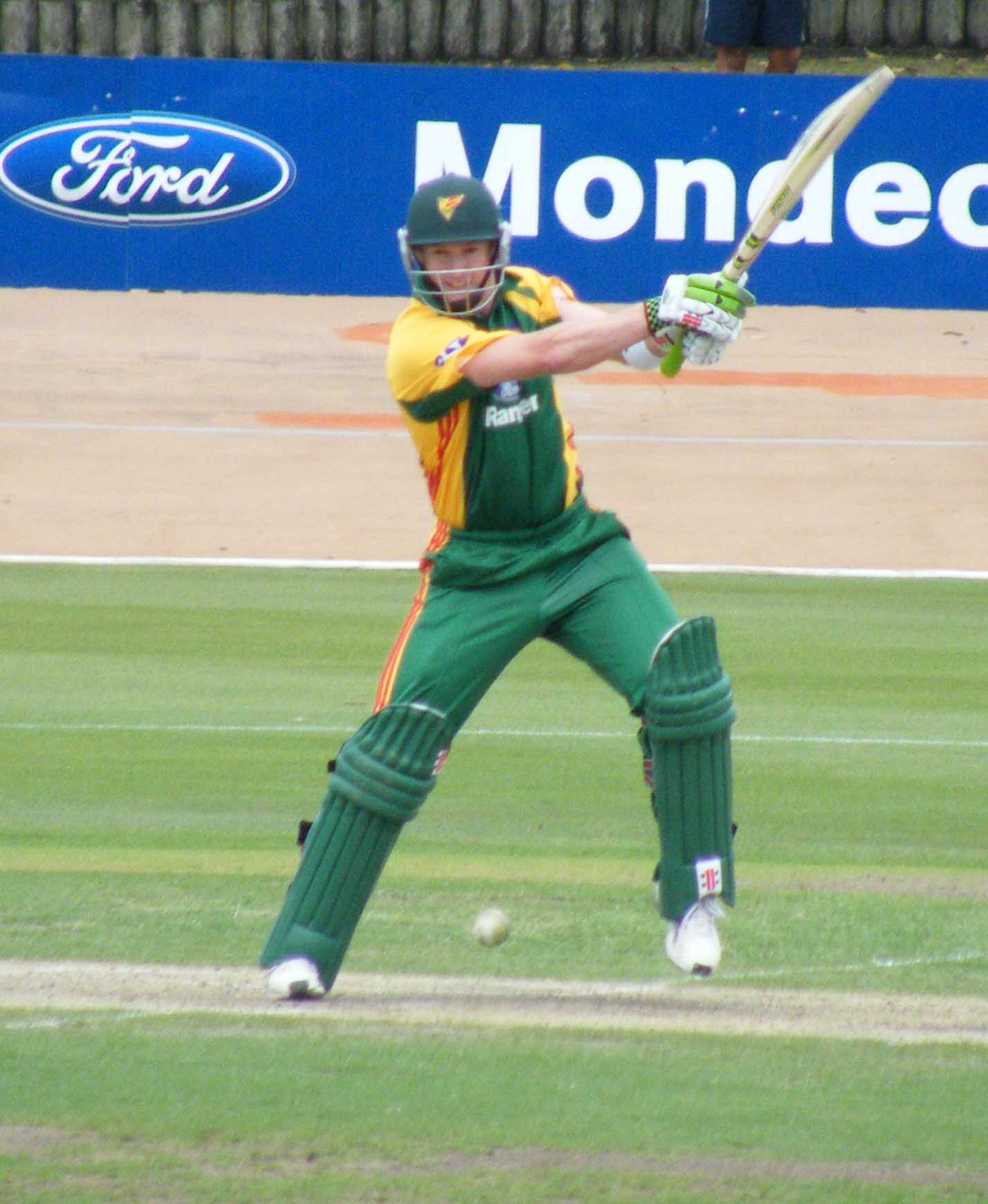
George Bailey, Australia's captain for the tournament.

No.	Player	Date of birth	T20Is	Batting	Bowling style	Twenty20 team
2	George Bailey (c)	7 September 1982 (aged 30)	4	Right	Right-arm medium	(Australia) Melbourne Stars
33	Shane Watson (vc)	17 June 1981 (aged 31)	27	Right	Right-arm fast-medium	(Australia) Sydney Sixers
54	Daniel Christian	4 May 1983 (aged 29)	6	Right	Right-arm fast-medium	(Australia) Brisbane Heat
30	Pat Cummins	8 May 1993 (aged 19)	2	Right	Right-arm fast	(Australia) Sydney Sixers
3	Xavier Doherty	22 November 1982 (aged 29)	4	Left	Slow left-arm orthodox	(Australia) Hobart Hurricanes
20	Ben Hilfenhaus	15 March 1983 (aged 29)	6	Right	Right-arm fast-medium	(Australia) Hobart Hurricanes
71	Brad Hogg	6 February 1971 (aged 41)	4	Left	Slow left-arm wrist-spin	(Australia) Perth Scorchers
29	David Hussey	15 July 1977 (aged 35)	36	Right	Right-arm off break	(Australia) Melbourne Stars
48	Michael Hussey	27 May 1975 (aged 37)	29	Left	Right-arm medium	(Australia) Perth Scorchers
28	Glenn Maxwell	14 October 1988 (aged 23)	0	Right	Right-arm off break	(Australia) Melbourne Renegades
27	Clinton McKay	22 February 1983 (aged 29)	4	Right	Right-arm fast-medium	(Australia) Melbourne Stars
56	Mitchell Starc	30 January 1990 (aged 22)	0	Left	Left-arm fast-medium	(Australia) Sydney Sixers
13	Matthew Wade (wk)	26 December 1987 (aged 24)	6	Left	–	(Australia) Melbourne Stars
31	David Warner	27 October 1986 (aged 25)	33	Left	Leg break	(Australia) Sydney Thunder
7	Cameron White	18 August 1983 (aged 29)	29	Right	Legbreak googly	(Australia) Melbourne Stars

=== Ireland ===
Coach: (Trinidad and Tobago) Phil Simmons

No.	Player	Date of birth	T20Is	Batting	Bowling style	Twenty20 team
34	William Porterfield (c)	6 September 1984 (aged 28)	28	Left	Right-arm off break	(England) Warwickshire Bears
22	Kevin O'Brien (vc)	4 March 1984 (aged 28)	28	Right	Right-arm medium-fast	(England) Somerset
83	Alex Cusack	29 October 1980 (aged 31)	21	Right	Right-arm medium-fast	(Ireland) Clontarf
50	George Dockrell	22 July 1992 (aged 20)	17	Right	Slow left-arm orthodox	(England) Somerset
23	Trent Johnston	29 April 1974 (aged 38)	26	Right	Right-arm fast-medium	(Ireland) Railway Union
57	Nigel Jones	22 April 1982 (aged 30)	3	Right	Right-arm medium	(Ireland) Civil Service North
–	Ed Joyce	22 September 1978 (aged 33)	11	Left	Right-arm medium	(England) Sussex Sharks
–	Tim Murtagh	2 August 1981 (aged 31)	1	Left	Right-arm fast-medium	(England) Middlesex Panthers
72	Niall O'Brien (wk)	8 November 1981 (aged 30)	18	Left	–	(England) Northants Steelbacks
30	Boyd Rankin	5 July 1984 (aged 28)	14	Left	Right-arm medium-fast	(England) Warwickshire Bears
–	Max Sorensen	18 November 1985 (aged 26)	9	Right	Right-arm fast-medium	(Ireland) The Hills
1	Paul Stirling	3 September 1990 (aged 22)	17	Right	Right-arm off break	(England) Middlesex Panthers
–	Stuart Thompson	15 August 1991 (aged 21)	0	Left	Right-arm medium-fast	(Ireland) The Hills
12	Andrew White	3 July 1980 (aged 32)	18	Right	Right-arm off break	(Ireland) Instonians
4	Gary Wilson (wk)	5 February 1986 (aged 26)	25	Right	–	(England) Surrey Lions

=== West Indies ===
Coach: (Barbados) Ottis Gibson

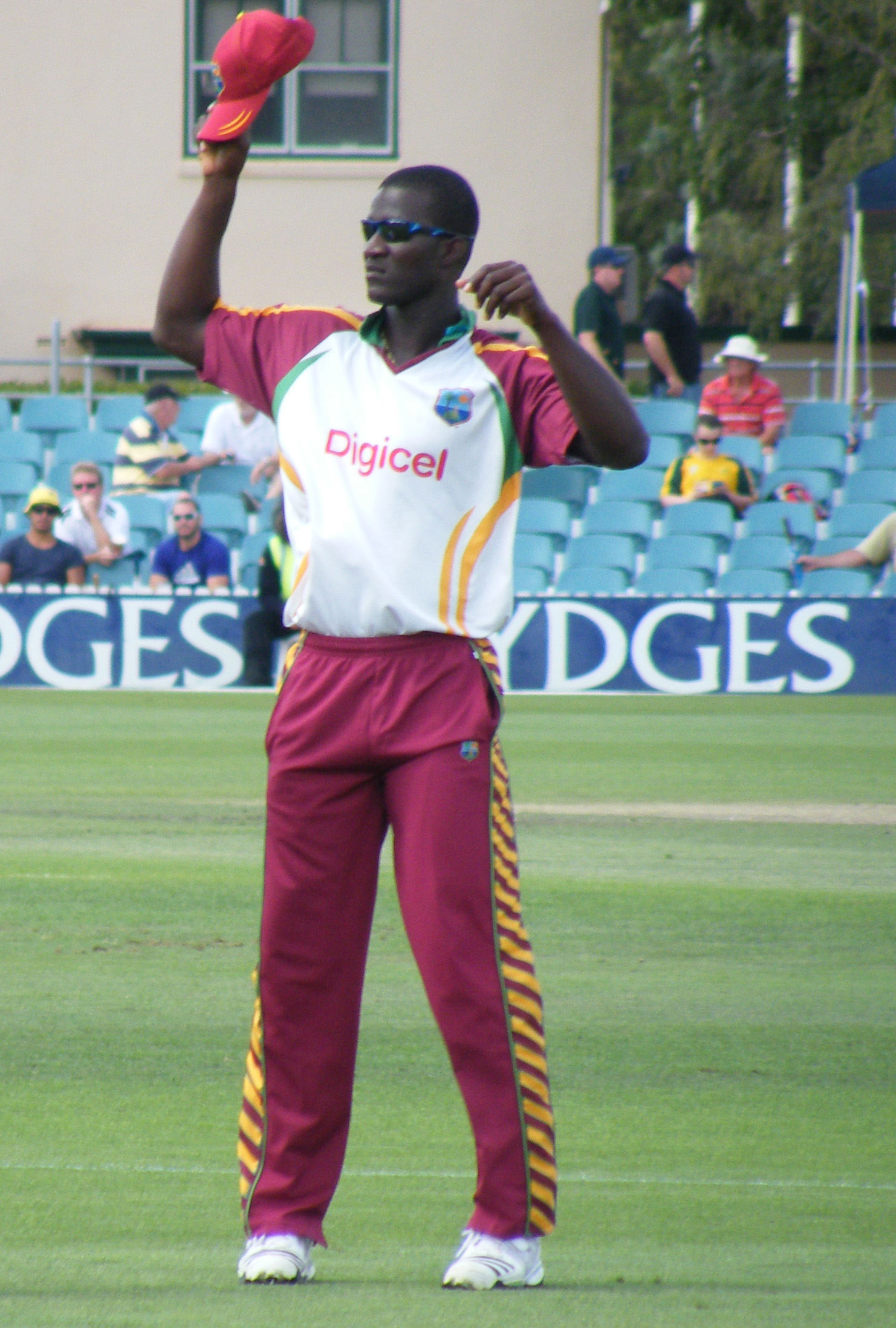
Darren Sammy, West Indies's captain for the tournament.

No.	Player	Date of birth	T20Is	Batting	Bowling style	Twenty20 team
88	Darren Sammy (c)	20 December 1983 (aged 28)	29	Right	Right-arm medium-fast	(Saint Lucia) Windward Islands
47	Dwayne Bravo (vc)	7 October 1983 (aged 28)	27	Right	Right-arm medium-fast	Trinidad and Tobago
77	Samuel Badree	9 March 1981 (aged 31)	2	Right	Leg break	Trinidad and Tobago
46	Darren Bravo	6 February 1989 (aged 23)	5	Left	Right-arm medium-fast	Trinidad and Tobago
25	Johnson Charles	14 January 1989 (aged 23)	6	Right	–	(Saint Lucia) Windward Islands
20	Fidel Edwards	6 February 1982 (aged 30)	17	Right	Right-arm fast	Barbados
45	Chris Gayle	21 September 1979 (aged 32)	23	Left	Right-arm off break	Jamaica
74	Sunil Narine	26 May 1988 (aged 24)	5	Left	Right-arm off break	Trinidad and Tobago
55	Kieron Pollard	12 May 1987 (aged 25)	24	Right	Right-arm medium-fast	Trinidad and Tobago
80	Denesh Ramdin (wk)	13 March 1985 (aged 27)	26	Right	–	Trinidad and Tobago
14	Ravi Rampaul	15 October 1984 (aged 27)	12	Left	Right-arm fast-medium	Trinidad and Tobago
12	Andre Russell	29 April 1988 (aged 24)	5	Right	Right-arm fast	Jamaica
7	Marlon Samuels	5 January 1981 (aged 31)	15	Right	Right-arm off break	Jamaica
54	Lendl Simmons (wk)	25 January 1985 (aged 27)	13	Right	Right-arm medium-fast	Trinidad and Tobago
50	Dwayne Smith	12 April 1983 (aged 29)	15	Right	Right-arm medium-fast	Barbados

== Group C ==
=== South Africa ===
Coach: (South Africa) Gary Kirsten

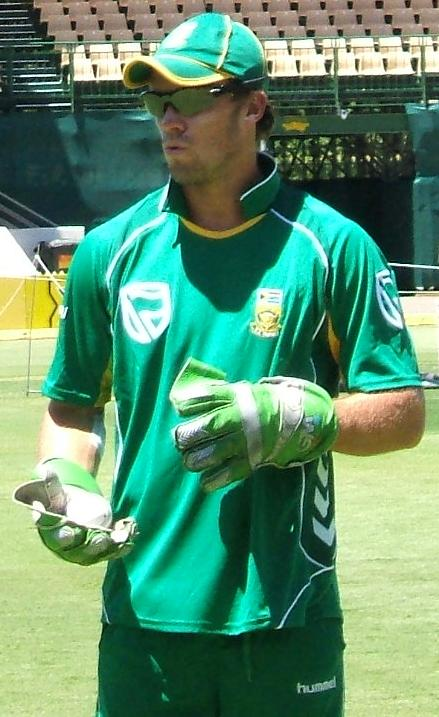
AB de Villiers, South Africa's captain in the tournament.

No.	Player	Date of birth	T20Is	Batting	Bowling style	Twenty20 team
17	AB de Villiers (c & wk)	2 May 1982 (aged 30)	36	Right	Right-arm medium	(South Africa) Titans
1	Hashim Amla (vc)	31 March 1983 (aged 29)	8	Right	Right-arm medium, Right-arm off break	(South Africa) Dolphins
24	Farhaan Behardien	17 February 1984 (aged 28)	1	Right	Right-arm fast-medium	(South Africa) Titans
22	Johan Botha	9 October 1983 (aged 28)	32	Right	Right-arm off break	(South Africa) Warriors
18	Francois du Plessis	14 April 1984 (aged 28)	0	Right	Leg break	(South Africa) Titans
21	JP Duminy	13 July 1984 (aged 28)	35	Right	Right-arm off break	(South Africa) Cape Cobras
3	Jacques Kallis	16 October 1975 (aged 36)	17	Right	Right-arm fast-medium	(South Africa) Cape Cobras
88	Richard Levi	14 January 1988 (aged 24)	4	Right	Right-arm medium	(South Africa) Cape Cobras
81	Albie Morkel	10 June 1981 (aged 31)	35	Left	Right-arm medium-fast	(South Africa) Titans
65	Morné Morkel	6 October 1984 (aged 27)	22	Left	Right-arm fast	(South Africa) Titans
14	Justin Ontong	4 January 1980 (aged 32)	7	Right	Right-arm off break	(South Africa) Cape Cobras
94	Wayne Parnell	30 July 1989 (aged 23)	15	Left	Left-arm medium-fast	(South Africa) Warriors
13	Robin Peterson	4 August 1979 (aged 33)	9	Left	Slow left-arm orthodox	(South Africa) Cape Cobras
8	Dale Steyn	27 June 1983 (aged 29)	21	Right	Right-arm fast	(South Africa) Cape Cobras
68	Lonwabo Tsotsobe	7 March 1984 (aged 28)	10	Right	Left-arm fast-medium	(South Africa) Warriors

=== Sri Lanka ===
Coach: (South Africa) Graham Ford

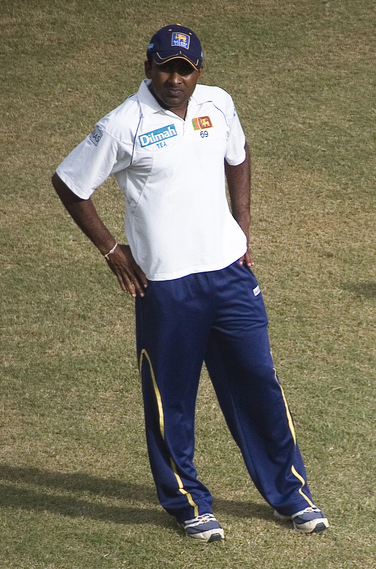
Mahela Jayawardene, Sri Lanka's captain for the tournament.

No.	Player	Date of birth	T20Is	Batting	Bowling style	Twenty20 team
27	Mahela Jayawardene (c)	27 May 1977 (aged 35)	37	Right	Right-arm medium	(Sri Lanka) Wayamba United
69	Angelo Mathews (vc)	2 June 1987 (aged 25)	28	Right	Right-arm fast-medium	(Sri Lanka) Nagenahira Nagas
17	Dinesh Chandimal	18 November 1989 (aged 22)	11	Right	Right-arm off break	(Sri Lanka) Wayamba United
–	Akila Dananjaya	4 October 1993 (aged 18)	0	Left	Right-arm off break	(Sri Lanka) Wayamba United
23	Tillakaratne Dilshan	14 October 1976 (aged 35)	38	Right	Right-arm off break	(Sri Lanka) Basnahira Cricket Dundee
22	Shaminda Eranga	23 June 1986 (aged 26)	1	Right	Right-arm medium-fast	(Sri Lanka) Nagenahira Nagas
14	Rangana Herath	19 March 1978 (aged 34)	3	Left	Slow left-arm orthodox	(Sri Lanka) Basnahira Cricket Dundee
92	Nuwan Kulasekara	22 July 1982 (aged 30)	17	Right	Right-arm fast-medium	(Sri Lanka) Nagenahira Nagas
99	Lasith Malinga	28 August 1983 (aged 29)	33	Right	Right-arm fast	(Sri Lanka) Ruhuna Royals
40	Ajantha Mendis	11 March 1985 (aged 27)	21	Right	Right-arm off break, Leg break	(Sri Lanka) Nagenahira Nagas
9	Jeevan Mendis	15 January 1983 (aged 29)	4	Left	Leg break	(Sri Lanka) Basnahira Cricket Dundee
24	Dilshan Munaweera	24 October 1989 (aged 22)	16	Right	Right-arm off break	(Sri Lanka) Uva Next
1	Thisara Perera	3 April 1989 (aged 23)	13	Left	Right-arm medium-fast	(Sri Lanka) Kandurata Warriors
11	Kumar Sangakkara (wk)	27 October 1977 (aged 34)	35	Left	Right-arm off break	(Sri Lanka) Kandurata Warriors
66	Lahiru Thirimanne	8 September 1989 (aged 23)	3	Left	Right-arm medium-fast	(Sri Lanka) Ruhuna Royals

=== Zimbabwe ===
Coach: (England) Alan Butcher

No.	Player	Date of birth	T20Is	Batting	Bowling style	Twenty20 team
1	Brendan Taylor (c & wk)	6 February 1986 (aged 26)	15	Right	Right-arm off break	(Zimbabwe) Mid West Rhinos
47	Elton Chigumbura	14 March 1986 (aged 26)	20	Right	Right-arm fast-medium	(Zimbabwe) Mashonaland Eagles
30	Graeme Cremer	19 September 1986 (aged 25)	7	Right	Legbreak googly	(Zimbabwe) Mid West Rhinos
77	Craig Ervine	19 August 1985 (aged 27)	3	Left	Right-arm off break	(Zimbabwe) Matabeleland Tuskers
8	Kyle Jarvis	16 February 1989 (aged 23)	6	Right	Right-arm fast-medium	(Zimbabwe) Mashonaland Eagles
3	Hamilton Masakadza	9 August 1983 (aged 29)	20	Right	Right-arm medium	(Zimbabwe) Mountaineers
45	Stuart Matsikenyeri	3 May 1983 (aged 29)	9	Right	Right-arm off break	(Zimbabwe) Mashonaland Eagles
28	Chris Mpofu	27 November 1985 (aged 26)	10	Right	Right-arm fast-medium	(Zimbabwe) Matabeleland Tuskers
66	Forster Mutizwa (wk)	24 August 1985 (aged 27)	3	Right	Right-arm off break	(Zimbabwe) Mashonaland Eagles
58	Richard Muzhange	30 January 1991 (aged 21)	0	Right	Right-arm medium	(Zimbabwe) Mid West Rhinos
7	Ray Price	12 June 1976 (aged 36)	15	Right	Slow left-arm orthodox	(Zimbabwe) Mashonaland Eagles
14	Vusi Sibanda	10 October 1983 (aged 28)	5	Right	Right-arm medium	(Zimbabwe) Mid West Rhinos
52	Prosper Utseya	26 March 1985 (aged 27)	18	Right	Right-arm off break	(Zimbabwe) Mountaineers
60	Brian Vitori	22 February 1990 (aged 22)	0	Left	Left-arm fast-medium	(Zimbabwe) Southern Rocks
9	Malcolm Waller	28 September 1984 (aged 27)	4	Right	Right-arm off break	(Zimbabwe) Mid West Rhinos

== Group D ==
=== Bangladesh ===
Coach: (England) Richard Pybus

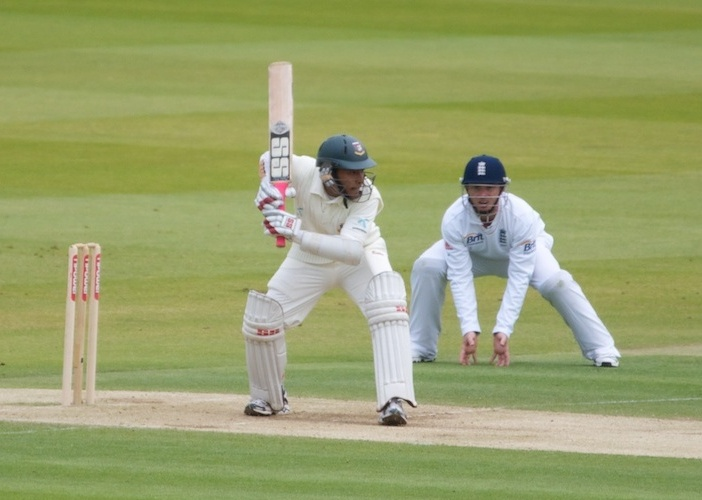
Mushfiqur Rahim (batting), Bangladesh's captain for the tournament.

No.	Player	Date of birth	T20Is	Batting	Bowling style	Twenty20 team
9	Mushfiqur Rahim (c & wk)	1 September 1988 (aged 24)	23	Right	–	(Bangladesh) Duronto Rajshahi
30	Mahmudullah (vc)	4 February 1986 (aged 26)	18	Right	Right-arm off break	(Bangladesh) Chittagong Kings
7	Mohammad Ashraful	7 July 1984 (aged 28)	20	Right	Right-arm off break, Leg break	(Bangladesh) Dhaka Gladiators
75	Shakib Al Hasan	24 March 1987 (aged 25)	22	Left	Slow left-arm orthodox	(Bangladesh) Khulna Royal Bengals
10	Abul Hasan	5 August 1992 (aged 20)	3	Left	Right-arm medium-fast	(Bangladesh) Sylhet Royals
–	Nasir Hossain	30 November 1991 (aged 20)	8	Right	Right-arm off break	(Bangladesh) Khulna Royal Bengals
29	Tamim Iqbal	20 March 1989 (aged 23)	21	Left	–	(Bangladesh) Chittagong Kings
–	Jahurul Islam	12 December 1986 (aged 25)	2	Right	Right-arm off break	(Bangladesh) Chittagong Kings
13	Shafiul Islam	6 October 1989 (aged 22)	6	Right	Right-arm fast-medium	(Bangladesh) Khulna Royal Bengals
2	Mashrafe Mortaza	5 October 1983 (aged 28)	18	Right	Right-arm fast-medium	(Bangladesh) Dhaka Gladiators
–	Ziaur Rahman	2 December 1986 (aged 25)	6	Right	Right-arm fast-medium	(Bangladesh) Chittagong Kings
41	Abdur Razzak	15 June 1982 (aged 30)	21	Left	Slow left-arm orthodox	(Bangladesh) Khulna Royal Bengals
–	Farhad Reza	16 June 1986 (aged 26)	8	Right	Right-arm fast-medium	(Bangladesh) Chittagong Kings
–	Junaid Siddique	30 October 1987 (aged 24)	7	Left	Right-arm off break	(Bangladesh) Duronto Rajshahi
19	Elias Sunny	1 January 1986 (aged 26)	6	Left	Slow left-arm orthodox	(Bangladesh) Dhaka Gladiators

=== New Zealand ===
Coach: (New Zealand) Mike Hesson

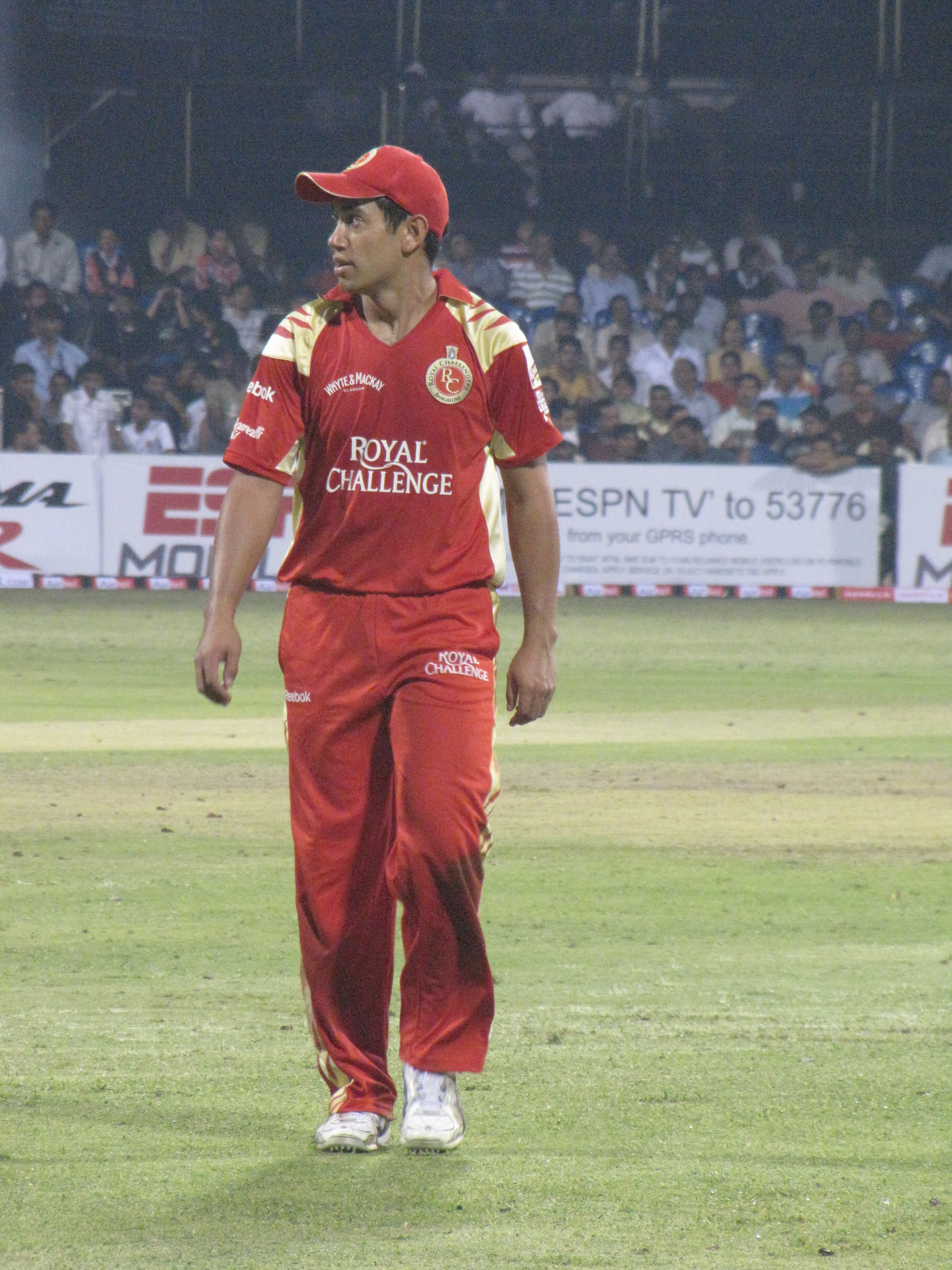
Ross Taylor, New Zealand's captain for the tournament.

No.	Player	Date of birth	T20Is	Batting	Bowling style	Twenty20 team
3	Ross Taylor (c)	8 March 1984 (aged 28)	40	Right	Right-arm off break	(New Zealand) Central Districts Stags
42	Brendon McCullum (vc) (wk)	27 September 1981 (aged 30)	47	Right	Right-arm medium	(New Zealand) Otago Volts
34	Doug Bracewell	28 September 1990 (aged 21)	8	Right	Right-arm fast-medium	(New Zealand) Central Districts Stags
70	James Franklin	7 November 1980 (aged 31)	23	Left	Left-arm fast-medium	(New Zealand) Wellington Firebirds
31	Martin Guptill	30 September 1986 (aged 25)	31	Right	Right-arm off break	(New Zealand) Auckland Aces
36	Ronnie Hira	23 January 1987 (aged 25)	6	Left	Left-arm slow	(New Zealand) Auckland Aces
15	Nathan McCullum	1 September 1980 (aged 32)	34	Right	Right-arm off break	(New Zealand) Otago Volts
37	Kyle Mills	15 March 1979 (aged 33)	28	Right	Right-arm fast-medium	(New Zealand) Auckland Aces
20	Adam Milne	13 April 1992 (aged 20)	2	Right	Right-arm medium-fast	(New Zealand) Central Districts Stags
28	Rob Nicol	28 May 1983 (aged 29)	10	Right	Right-arm medium, Right-arm off break	(New Zealand) Canterbury Wizards
24	Jacob Oram	28 July 1978 (aged 34)	30	Left	Right-arm fast-medium	(New Zealand) Central Districts Stags
38	Tim Southee	11 December 1988 (aged 23)	25	Right	Right-arm medium-fast	(New Zealand) Northern Districts Knights
11	Daniel Vettori	27 January 1979 (aged 33)	28	Left	Slow left-arm orthodox	(New Zealand) Northern Districts Knights
47	BJ Watling ( wk)	9 July 1985 (aged 27)	2	Right	–	(New Zealand) Northern Districts Knights
22	Kane Williamson	8 August 1990 (aged 22)	8	Right	Right-arm off break	(New Zealand) Northern Districts Knights

=== Pakistan ===
Coach: (Australia) Dav Whatmore

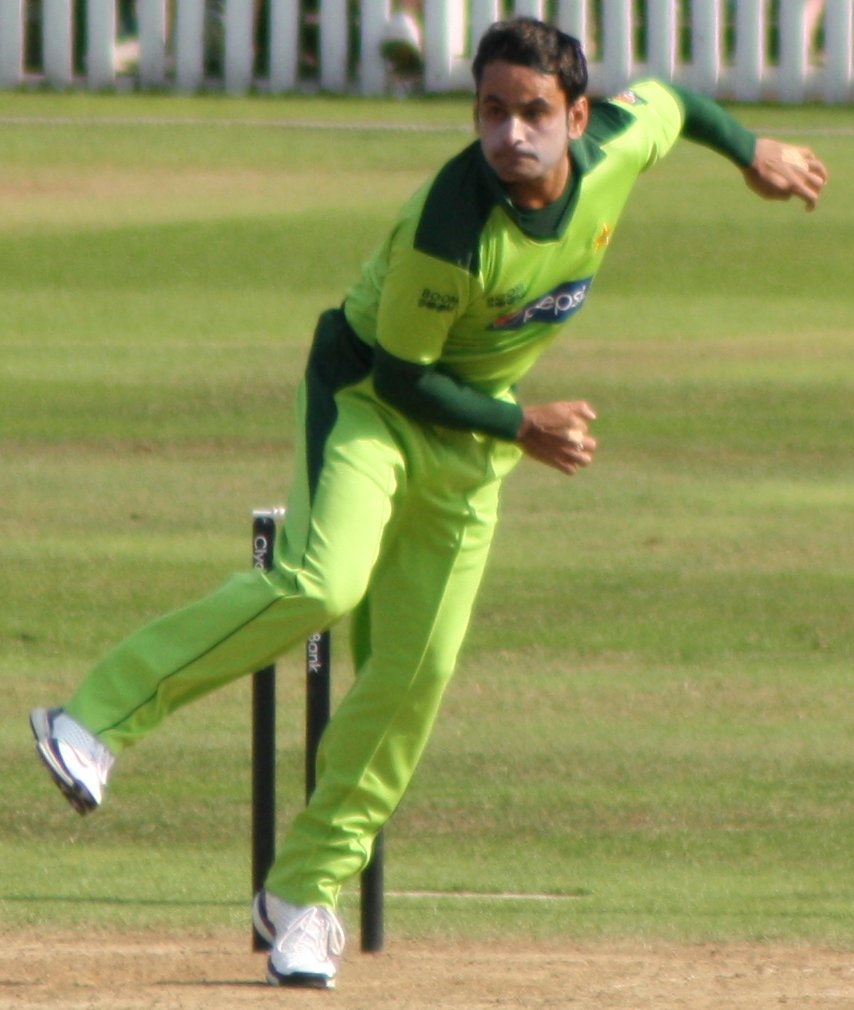
Mohammad Hafeez, Pakistan's captain for the tournament.

No.	Player	Date of birth	T20Is	Batting	Bowling style	Twenty20 team
8	Mohammad Hafeez (c)	17 October 1980 (aged 31)	31	Right	Right-arm off break	(Pakistan) Faisalabad Wolves
10	Shahid Afridi	1 March 1980 (aged 32)	50	Right	Leg break googly	(Pakistan) Karachi Dolphins
50	Saeed Ajmal	14 October 1977 (aged 34)	39	Right	Right-arm off break	(Pakistan) Faisalabad Wolves
96	Kamran Akmal (wk)	13 January 1982 (aged 30)	38	Right	–	(Pakistan) Lahore Lions
23	Umar Akmal	26 May 1990 (aged 22)	31	Right	–	(Pakistan) Lahore Lions
27	Yasir Arafat	12 March 1982 (aged 30)	8	Right	Right-arm fast	(Pakistan) Rawalpindi Rams
55	Umar Gul	14 April 1984 (aged 28)	40	Right	Right-arm fast-medium	(Pakistan) Peshawar Panthers
100	Raza Hasan	8 July 1992 (aged 20)	0	Right	Slow left-arm orthodox	(Pakistan) Sialkot Stallions
77	Nasir Jamshed	6 December 1989 (aged 22)	0	Left	–	(Pakistan) Lahore Lions
6	Shoaib Malik	1 February 1982 (aged 30)	41	Right	Right-arm off break	(Pakistan) Sialkot Stallions
16	Imran Nazir	16 December 1981 (aged 30)	16	Right	Leg break	(Pakistan) Sialkot Stallions
12	Abdul Razzaq	2 December 1979 (aged 32)	26	Right	Right-arm fast-medium	(Pakistan) Lahore Lions
7	Mohammad Sami	24 February 1981 (aged 31)	5	Right	Right-arm fast	(Pakistan) Karachi Dolphins
81	Asad Shafiq	28 January 1986 (aged 26)	10	Right	Leg break	(Pakistan) Karachi Dolphins
33	Sohail Tanvir	12 December 1984 (aged 27)	21	Left	Left-arm medium-fast	(Pakistan) Rawalpindi Rams
