= 2016–17 Departmental One Day Cup =

Cricket tournament

- Dates: 17 December 2016 – 2 January 2017
- Administrator: Pakistan Cricket Board
- Cricket format: List A cricket
- Tournament format(s): Round-robin and Finals
- Champions: Habib Bank Limited
- Participants: 8
- Matches: 29
- Most runs: Ahmed Shehzad (653)
- Most wickets: Faheem Ashraf (19)
- Official website: PCB

The 2016–17 Departmental One Day Cup was a List A cricket tournament in Pakistan. The competition ran from 17 December 2016 to 2 January 2017. The final was played between Sui Southern Gas Corporation and Habib Bank Limited, with Habib Bank Limited winning the match by 5 wickets.

== Teams ==
The following teams competed:

- Habib Bank Limited
- Khan Research Laboratories
- National Bank of Pakistan
- Pakistan International Airlines
- Sui Northern Gas Pipelines Limited
- Sui Southern Gas Corporation
- United Bank Limited
- Water and Power Development Authority

== Points table ==
Team	Pld	W	L	NR	Pts	NRR
Sui Northern Gas Pipelines Limited	7	5	2	0	10	+0.345
Water and Power Development Authority	7	5	2	0	10	+0.342
Habib Bank Limited	7	5	2	0	10	–0.020
Sui Southern Gas Corporation	7	4	3	0	8	+0.605
National Bank of Pakistan	7	3	4	0	6	–0.252
United Bank Limited	7	2	5	0	4	–0.139
Khan Research Laboratories	7	2	5	0	4	–0.251
Pakistan International Airlines	7	2	5	0	4	–0.634

Teams qualified for the finals

== Fixtures ==
=== Round-robin ===
17 December 2016
Scorecard

Sui Northern Gas Pipelines Limited; 284/8 (50 overs)	v	Pakistan International Airlines; 218 (46.2 overs)
Imran Butt 73 (89); Anwar Ali 3/55 (10 overs)		Agha Sabir 73 (76); Imran Khalid 2/34 (8 overs)

Sui Northern Gas Pipelines Limited won by 66 runs
National Stadium, Karachi
Umpires: Ahsan Raza and Rashid Riaz

- Pakistan International Airlines won the toss and elected to field.
- Abdul Samad (Pakistan International Airlines) and Salman Afridi (Sui Northern Gas Pipelines Limited) both made their List A debuts.

17 December 2016
Scorecard

National Bank of Pakistan; 217 (48.4 overs)	v	Khan Research Laboratories; 143 (44.4 overs)
Kamran Ghulam 61 (79); Sadaf Hussain 3/41 (10 overs)		Saeed Anwar 30 (72); Kamran Ghulam 5/30 (9.4 overs)

National Bank of Pakistan won by 74 runs
Niaz Stadium, Hyderabad
Umpires: Ahmed Shahab and Ghaffar Kazmi

- National Bank of Pakistan won the toss and elected to bat.
- Ahsan Hafeez (National Bank of Pakistan) made his List A debut.

17 December 2016
Scorecard

Water and Power Development Authority; 161 (49.5 overs)	v	Habib Bank Limited; 162/4 (42 overs)
Ayaz Tasawwar 65 (92); Ali Shafiq 3/27 (9 overs)		Imam-ul-Haq 93 (126); Mansoor Amjad 2/42 (9 overs)

Habib Bank Limited won by 6 wickets
State Bank of Pakistan Sports Complex, Karachi
Umpires: Imtiaz Iqbal and Khalid Mahmood

- Water and Power Development Authority and elected to bat.
- Ali Shafiq (Habib Bank Limited) made his List A debut.

17 December 2016
Scorecard

Sui Southern Gas Corporation; 333/9 (50 overs)	v	United Bank Limited; 254/8 (50 overs)
Asif Zakir 103 (98); Rumman Raees 4/48 (10 overs)		Shan Masood 103* (137); Zia-ul-Haq 2/38 (8 overs)

Sui Southern Gas Corporation won by 79 runs
United Bank Limited Sports Complex, Karachi
Umpires: Asif Yaqoob and Riazuddin

- United Bank Limited won the toss and elected to field.

19 December 2016
Scorecard

Habib Bank Limited; 193 (45 overs)	v	Sui Northern Gas Pipelines Limited; 194/4 (42.4 overs)
Ahmed Shehzad 71 (90); Imran Khalid 4/32 (9 overs)		Imran Butt 70 (104); Fakhar Zaman 1/13 (3 overs)

Sui Northern Gas Pipelines Limited won by 6 wickets
National Stadium, Karachi
Umpires: Khalid Mahmood and Rashid Riaz

- Sui Northern Gas Pipelines Limited won the toss and elected to field.

19 December 2016
Scorecard

Water and Power Development Authority; 285 (50 overs)	v	National Bank of Pakistan; 187 (46.5 overs)
Kamran Akmal 120 (117); Mohammad Irfan 3/51 (10 overs)		Usman Salahuddin 49 (77); Mohammad Irfan 4/25 (7.5 overs)

Water and Power Development Authority won by 98 runs
Niaz Stadium, Hyderabad
Umpires: Ahmed Shahab and Ghaffar Kazmi

- National Bank of Pakistan won the toss and elected to field.
- Asadullah (National Bank of Pakistan) made his List A debut.

19 December 2016
Scorecard

United Bank Limited; 152 (43.4 overs)	v	Khan Research Laboratories; 155/2 (31.5 overs)
Saeed Bin Nasir 52 (77); Sadaf Hussain 3/39 (7.4 overs)		Shoaib Ahmed 80* (90); Mir Hamza 1/13 (5 overs)

Khan Research Laboratories won by 8 wickets
United Bank Limited Sports Complex, Karachi
Umpires: Asif Yaqoob and Imtiaz Iqbal

- Khan Research Laboratories won the toss and elected to field.

19 December 2016
Scorecard

Pakistan International Airlines; 177/9 (34 overs)	v	Sui Southern Gas Corporation; 179/3 (31.4 overs)
Faisal Iqbal 66 (71); Aamer Yamin 3/28 (6 overs)		Awais Zia 56 (53); Tahir Khan 1/24 (6 overs)

Sui Southern Gas Corporation won by 7 wickets
State Bank of Pakistan Sports Complex, Karachi
Umpires: Ahsan Raza and Riazuddin

- Sui Southern Gas Corporation won the toss and elected to field.
- Bilal Shah (Pakistan International Airlines) made his List A debut.

21 December 2016
Scorecard

Sui Northern Gas Pipelines Limited; 213 (47.3 overs)	v	Water and Power Development Authority; 217/7 (45.2 overs)
Imran Butt 46 (51); Mansoor Amjad 5/39 (10 overs)		Nauman Anwar 76 (70); Mohammad Hafeez 2/21 (10 overs)

Water and Power Development Authority won by 3 wickets
Niaz Stadium, Hyderabad
Umpires: Ahmed Shahab and Ghaffar Kazmi

- Water and Power Development Authority won the toss and elected to field.

21 December 2016
Scorecard

Pakistan International Airlines; 267/7 (50 overs)	v	National Bank of Pakistan; 269/5 (45.4 overs)
Shoaib Khan 67 (73); Kamran Ghulam 2/37 (9 overs)		Hamza Paracha 75 (95); Aizaz Cheema 3/36 (7 overs)

National Bank of Pakistan won by 5 wickets
National Stadium, Karachi
Umpires: Ahsan Raza and Asif Yaqoob

- National Bank of Pakistan won the toss and elected to field.

21 December 2016
Scorecard

Habib Bank Limited; 267 (49 overs)	v	United Bank Limited; 253 (49.1 overs)
Ahmed Shehzad 102 (102); Zohaib Shera 3/38 (9 overs)		Sohaib Maqsood 98 (92); Zohaib Khan 3/32 (7 overs)

Habib Bank Limited won by 14 runs
United Bank Limited Sports Complex, Karachi
Umpires: Khalid Mahmood and Riazuddin

- United Bank Limited won the toss and elected to field.

21 December 2016
Scorecard

Khan Research Laboratories; 239 (45.5 overs)	v	Sui Southern Gas Corporation; 220/9 (44.4 overs)
Junaid Ali 86 (101); Zia-ul-Haq 4/45 (10 overs)		Adil Amin 75 (80); Mohammad Abbas 3/37 (9.4 overs)

Khan Research Laboratories won by 11 runs (D/L method)
State Bank of Pakistan Sports Complex, Karachi
Umpires: Imtiaz Iqbal and Rashid Riaz

- Sui Southern Gas Corporation won the toss and elected to field.

23 December 2016
Scorecard

National Bank of Pakistan; 273 (50 overs)	v	Sui Northern Gas Pipelines Limited; 274/4 (48.2 overs)
Usman Salahuddin 92 (106); Mohammad Imran 4/46 (7 overs)		Imran Butt 102 (126); Asadullah 1/28 (5 overs)

Sui Northern Gas Pipelines Limited won by 7 wickets
United Bank Limited Sports Complex, Karachi
Umpires: Ahsan Raza and Asif Yaqoob

- Sui Northern Gas Pipelines Limited won the toss and elected to field.

23 December 2016
Scorecard

Sui Southern Gas Corporation; 349/7 (50 overs)	v	Habib Bank Limited; 279 (45.1 overs)
Awais Zia 134 (101); Faheem Ashraf 3/68 (9 overs)		Fakhar Zaman 72 (53); Zia-ul-Haq 4/40 (8 overs)

Sui Southern Gas Corporation won by 70 runs
Niaz Stadium, Hyderabad
Umpires: Ghaffar Kazmi and Zameer Haider

- Sui Southern Gas Corporation won the toss and elected to bat.

23 December 2016
Scorecard

United Bank Limited; 221/9 (50 overs)	v	Water and Power Development Authority; 222/7 (49.5 overs)
Shan Masood 75 (107); Zulfiqar Babar 4/30 (9 overs)		Kamran Akmal 70 (98); Rumman Raees 2/29 (10 overs)

Water and Power Development Authority won by 3 wickets
National Stadium, Karachi
Umpires: Ahmed Shahab and Khalid Mahmood

- Water and Power Development Authority won the toss and elected to field.

23 December 2016
Scorecard

Khan Research Laboratories; 183 (49.4 overs)	v	Pakistan International Airlines; 184/7 (45 overs)
Abdul Rehman Muzammil 58 (94); Hasan Mahmood 2/19 (8 overs)		Anwar Ali 78* (89); Ahmed Bashir 3/42 (10 overs)

Pakistan International Airlines won by 3 wickets
State Bank of Pakistan Sports Complex, Karachi
Umpires: Rashid Riaz and Riazuddin

- Pakistan International Airlines won the toss and elected to field.

25 December 2016
Scorecard

Sui Northern Gas Pipelines Limited; 277/9 (50 overs)	v	Khan Research Laboratories; 240 (47.3 overs)
Iftikhar Ahmed 94 (119); Mohammad Abbas 4/31 (10 overs)		Mohammad Yasin 45 (65); Azizullah 5/33 (9.3 overs)

Sui Northern Gas Pipelines Limited won by 37 runs
United Bank Limited Sports Complex, Karachi
Umpires: Ghaffar Kazmi and Rashid Riaz

- Sui Northern Gas Pipelines Limited won the toss and elected to bat.

25 December 2016
Scorecard

National Bank of Pakistan; 238 (48.3 overs)	v	Habib Bank Limited; 239/2 (44.4 overs)
Ahsan Ali 54 (51); Usman Khan 4/20 (9.3 overs)		Fakhar Zaman 86 (77); Kamran Ghulam 2/46 (10 overs)

Habib Bank Limited won by 8 wickets
National Stadium, Karachi
Umpires: Khalid Mahmood and Riazuddin

- Habib Bank Limited won the toss and elected to field.

25 December 2016
Scorecard

Sui Southern Gas Corporation; 208 (48 overs)	v	Water and Power Development Authority; 209/7 (50 overs)
Fawad Alam 96* (116); Zulfiqar Babar 4/43 (9 overs)		Mansoor Amjad 46 (62); Aamer Yamin 2/39 (10 overs)

Water and Power Development Authority won by 3 wickets
State Bank of Pakistan Sports Complex, Karachi
Umpires: Ahmed Shahab and Imtiaz Iqbal

- Water and Power Development Authority won the toss and elected to field.

25 December 2016
Scorecard

United Bank Limited; 288/7 (50 overs)	v	Pakistan International Airlines; 156 (35.5 overs)
Shan Masood 82 (112); Hasan Mahmood 2/48 (10 overs)		Shoaib Khan 41 (58); Umair Khan 4/31 (9 overs)

United Bank Limited won by 132 runs
Niaz Stadium, Hyderabad
Umpires: Asif Yaqoob and Zameer Haider

- Pakistan International Airlines won the toss and elected to field.

27 December 2016
Scorecard

United Bank Limited; 265 (50 overs)	v	Sui Northern Gas Pipelines Limited; 242 (48.2 overs)
Shan Masood 108 (130); Azizullah 4/65 (10 overs)		Imran Butt 97 (113); Rumman Raees 3/39 (9 overs)

United Bank Limited won by 23 runs
Niaz Stadium, Hyderabad
Umpires: Aaley Haider and Asif Yaqoob

- Sui Northern Gas Pipelines Limited won the toss and elected to field.
- Mudassar Riaz (Sui Northern Gas Pipelines Limited) made his List A debut.

27 December 2016
Scorecard

Sui Southern Gas Corporation; 246/9 (50 overs)	v	National Bank of Pakistan; 181 (43.3 overs)
Zain Abbas 63 (108); Yasir Hussain 2/35 (10 overs)		Hamza Paracha 40 (67); Mohammad Irfan 3/29 (10 overs)

Sui Southern Gas Corporation won by 65 runs
United Bank Limited Sports Complex, Karachi
Umpires: Ghaffar Kazmi and Riazuddin

- Sui Southern Gas Corporation won the toss and elected to bat.

27 December 2016
Scorecard

Khan Research Laboratories; 282/9 (50 overs)	v	Habib Bank Limited; 283/5 (48.1 overs)
Junaid Ali 143 (127); Faheem Ashraf 3/42 (10 overs)		Aftab Alam 125* (104); Sadaf Hussain 2/52 (10 overs)

Habib Bank Limited won by 5 wickets
National Stadium, Karachi
Umpires: Khalid Mahmood and Rashid Riaz

- Habib Bank Limited won the toss and elected to field.

27 December 2016
Scorecard

Water and Power Development Authority; 219/7 (50 overs)	v	Pakistan International Airlines; 221/5 (48.3 overs)
Salman Butt 73 (113); Hasan Mahmood 3/32 (10 overs)		Abdul Samad 51 (82); Khalid Usman 2/40 (10 overs)

Pakistan International Airlines won by 5 wickets
State Bank of Pakistan Sports Complex, Karachi
Umpires: Ahmed Shahab and Shozab Raza

- Pakistan International Airlines won the toss and elected to field.

29 December 2016
Scorecard

Sui Southern Gas Corporation; 238 (49.1 overs)	v	Sui Northern Gas Pipelines Limited; 239/5 (46.3 overs)
Shoaib Malik 94 (111); Asad Ali 4/43 (9 overs)		Iftikhar Ahmed 85 (107); Mohammad Irfan 3/40 (10 overs)

Sui Northern Gas Pipelines Limited won by 5 wickets
National Stadium, Karachi
Umpires: Ghaffar Kazmi and Rashid Riaz

- Sui Northern Gas Pipelines Limited and elected to field.

29 December 2016
Scorecard

United Bank Limited; 250/9 (50 overs)	v	National Bank of Pakistan; 251/4 (47 overs)
Wajihuddin 76 (62); Mohammad Irfan 3/35 (10 overs)		Hamza Paracha 59 (100); Sohaib Maqsood 2/46 (10 overs)

National Bank of Pakistan won by 6 wickets
United Bank Limited Sports Complex, Karachi
Umpires: Ahmed Shahab and Riazuddin

- National Bank of Pakistan won the toss and elected to field.

29 December 2016
Scorecard

Pakistan International Airlines; 257/5 (20 overs)	v	Habib Bank Limited; 263/7 (49.4 overs)
Shoaib Khan 60 (85); Faheem Ashraf 2/54 (10 overs)		Ahmed Shehzad 112* (112); Tahir Khan 3/50 (10 overs)

Habib Bank Limited won by 3 wickets
State Bank of Pakistan Sports Complex, Karachi
Umpires: Khalid Mahmood and Shozab Raza

- Habib Bank Limited won the toss and elected to field.
- Hazrat Shah (Pakistan International Airlines) made his List A debut.

29 December 2016
Scorecard

Water and Power Development Authority; 260/7 (47 overs)	v	Khan Research Laboratories; 224/7 (47 overs)
Kamran Akmal 107 (113); Mohammad Abbas 4/43 (10 overs)		Nauman Ali 58* (28); Mansoor Amjad 3/31 (10 overs)

Water and Power Development Authority won by 36 runs
Niaz Stadium, Hyderabad
Umpires: Ahsan Raza and Asif Yaqoob

- Khan Research Laboratories won the toss and elected to field.

== Finals ==
1st Semi-final
31 December 2016
Scorecard

Sui Northern Gas Pipelines Limited; 284/8 (50 overs)	v	Habib Bank Limited; 287/4 (46.1 overs)
Imran Khalid 105* (79); Amad Butt 3/44 (10 overs)		Ahmed Shehzad 166 (133); Azizullah 1/39 (4 overs)

Habib Bank Limited won by 6 wickets
National Stadium, Karachi
Umpires: Ahmed Shahab and Shozab Raza

- Habib Bank Limited won the toss and elected to field.

2nd Semi-final
31 December 2016
Scorecard

Water and Power Development Authority; 145/9 (45 overs)	v	Sui Southern Gas Corporation; 148/4 (29.3 overs)
Aamer Sajjad 43 (73); Ahmed Jamal 2/14 (5 overs)		Awais Zia 59 (57); Khalid Usman 2/33 (6 overs)

Sui Southern Gas Corporation won by 6 wickets
National Bank of Pakistan Sports Complex, Karachi
Umpires: Ahsan Raza and Khalid Mahmood

- Sui Southern Gas Corporation won the toss and elected to field.

Final
2 January 2017
Scorecard

Sui Southern Gas Corporation; 232/7 (50 overs)	v	Habib Bank Limited; 235/5 (47.4 overs)
Shoaib Malik 93 (92); Zohaib Khan 2/22 (6 overs)		Ahmed Shehzad 68 (51); Mohammad Irfan 3/48 (10 overs)

Habib Bank Limited won by 5 wickets
National Stadium, Karachi
Umpires: Ahsan Raza and Shozab Raza

- Habib Bank Limited won the toss and elected to field.
