= Fazal Niazai =

Afghan cricketer

Personal information
- Born: 1 February 1990 (age 36)
- Batting: Right-handed
- Bowling: Right-arm medium

International information
- National side: Afghanistan
- Only T20I (cap 39): 20 September 2019 v Zimbabwe

Domestic team information
- Years: Team
- 2011/12: Afghan Cheetahs

Career statistics
Competition	FC	List A	T20
Matches	2	4	2
Runs scored	97	12	24
Batting average	32.33	4.00	24.00
100s/50s	0/0	0/0	0/0
Top score	42*	11	21
Balls bowled	106	138	–
Wickets	1	6	–
Bowling average	48.00	16.33	–
5 wickets in innings	0	0	–
10 wickets in match	0	0	–
Best bowling	1/5	3/20	–
Catches/stumpings	2/–	0/–	0/–
- Source: Cricinfo, 20 September 2019

Fazal Niazai (born 1 February 1990) is an Afghan cricketer. He made his international debut for the Afghanistan cricket team in September 2019 in a Twenty20 International against Zimbabwe. He is a right-handed batsman who bowls right-arm medium pace.

== Domestic career ==
Niyazai made his Twenty20 debut for the Afghan Cheetahs in the Faysal Bank Twenty-20 Cup against Faisalabad Wolves. He played a further match in that competition, against Multan Tigers. In these two matches, he scored a total of 24 with a high score of 21. He made his first-class debut for Afghanistan against Kenya in the 2011–13 ICC Intercontinental Cup on 6 October 2013.

In September 2018, he was named in Nangarhar's squad in the first edition of the Afghanistan Premier League tournament.

== International career ==
In August 2019, he was named in Afghanistan's Twenty20 International (T20I) squad for the 2019–20 Bangladesh Tri-Nation Series. He made his T20I debut for Afghanistan, against Zimbabwe, on 20 September 2019.
