= Mohammad Zahid =

Muhammad Zahid may refer to:

- Mohammad Zahid (cricketer, born 1966), Pakistani cricketer
- Mohammad Zahid (cricketer, born 1976), former Pakistani Test cricketer
- Mohammad Zahid (cricketer, born 1982), Pakistani first-class cricketer
- Mohammad Zahid (cricketer, born 1985), Pakistani first-class cricketer
- Mohamed Zahid Hossain (born 1988), Bangladeshi footballer
- Muhammad Zahid Sheikh, Pakistani field hockey player
