= Shoaib Khan =

Shoaib Khan may refer to:

- Shoaib Sultan Khan (born 1933), Pakistani civil servant
- Shoaib Khan (cricketer, born 1978), Pakistani cricketer
- Shoaib Khan (cricketer, born 1985), Pakistani cricketer
- Shoaib Md Khan (born 1991), Indian cricketer
- Shoaib Khan (cricketer, born 1992), Indian-born Omani cricketer
- Shoaib Khan, fictional criminal in the 2013 Indian film Once Upon ay Time in Mumbai Dobaara!, portrayed by Akshay Kumar
