= Nasir Awais =

Pakistani cricketer

Personal information
- Full name: Nasir Awais
- Born: 6 June 1983 (age 43); Hyderabad, Sindh, Pakistan
- Batting: Right-handed
- Bowling: Right-arm off break
- Role: Bowler

Domestic team information
- Years: Team
- 2004/05–2015/16: Hyderabad
- 2006/07–2015/16: Hyderabad Hawks
- 2017/18: Peshawar

Career statistics
Competition	First-class	List A	Twenty20
Matches	48	28	21
Runs scored	1,027	152	37
Batting average	16.04	8.94	9.25
100s/50s	0/0	0/0	0/0
Top score	45	24	8*
Balls bowled	9,590	1,485	467
Wickets	152	38	23
Bowling average	30.80	30.44	27.21
5 wickets in innings	5	1	0
10 wickets in match	1	0	0
Best bowling	6/62	5/10	3/25
Catches/stumpings	28/–	8/–	8/–
- Source: Cricinfo, 13 April 2026

Nasir Awais (born 6 June 1983) is a Pakistani former cricketer. Awais was a right-handed batsman who bowled right-arm off break. He was born in Hyderabad, Sindh.

Awais made his first-class debut for Hyderabad against Sialkot in the 2004–05 Quaid-e-Azam Trophy. He made his Twenty20 debut for Hyderabad Hawks against Karachi Zebras in the 2006–07 ABN-AMRO Twenty-20 Cup, and his List A debut for the Hawks against Lahore Lions in the 2006–07 ABN-AMRO Cup. He also played for Pakistan Navy, Pakistan Customs, Dewan Farooq Motor Limited, Omar Associates, and Peshawar.

In January 2007, Awais took 5 wickets for 59 runs against Abbottabad, at the time his best figures in first-class cricket. In March 2012, he produced his best List A bowling figures of 5 for 10 and then scored an unbeaten 21 as Hyderabad Hawks defeated Karachi Zebras by five wickets in the One Day National Cup Division II. The following year, playing for Hyderabad in the Regional Inter-district Senior Cricket Tournament, he claimed ten wickets in the match against Badin and also made an unbeaten 54.

Awais also featured prominently for Pakistan Navy in departmental cricket. In May 2013, he took 5 for 43 against Noman Traders in the Hinopak Trophy KCCA Inter-departmental Cricket League. In March 2014, he took 5 for 74 in the second innings to finish with match figures of 11 for 152 against Sindh Police in the Patron's Trophy. A year later, again against Sindh Police, he took 6 for 60 in the first innings and followed it with 2 wickets in the second innings as Navy closed in on victory.

In September 2017, Awais was named in Peshawar's squad for the 2017–18 Quaid-e-Azam Trophy through the player draft system. He played his last first-class matches for Peshawar in that tournament.
