= Ali Azmat (cricketer) =

Pakistani cricketer

Personal information
- Full name: Ali Azmat
- Born: 1 January 1979 (age 47); Lahore, Punjab, Pakistan
- Batting: Left-handed
- Bowling: Slow left-arm orthodox
- Role: Batsman

Domestic team information
- Years: Team
- 2005/06–2007/08: Lahore Eagles
- 2006/07–2007/08: Lahore Ravi
- 2008/09–2013/14: Water and Power Development Authority
- 2004/05, 2015/16–2016/17: Lahore Whites

Career statistics
| Competition | First-class | List A | Twenty20 |
|---|---|---|---|
| Matches | 66 | 44 | 26 |
| Runs scored | 3,389 | 751 | 353 |
| Batting average | 38.95 | 28.88 | 20.76 |
| 100s/50s | 7/17 | 0/3 | 0/1 |
| Top score | 130* | 57* | 69* |
| Balls bowled | 1,669 | 807 | 390 |
| Wickets | 28 | 17 | 17 |
| Bowling average | 35.89 | 41.23 | 28.47 |
| 5 wickets in innings | 0 | 0 | 0 |
| 10 wickets in match | 0 | 0 | 0 |
| Best bowling | 3/3 | 4/28 | 3/15 |
| Catches/stumpings | 18/– | 12/– | 5/– |
- Source: Cricinfo, 14 April 2026

Ali Azmat (born 1 January 1979) is a Pakistani former cricketer. Azmat was a left-handed batsman who bowled slow left-arm orthodox. He was born in Lahore, Punjab.

Azmat made his first-class debut for Lahore Whites against Multan in the 2004–05 Quaid-e-Azam Trophy. He made his List A debut for Lahore Eagles against Multan Tigers in January 2005, and his Twenty20 debut for the Eagles against Sialkot Stallions in April 2005. He later played first-class cricket for Lahore Ravi and Water and Power Development Authority, before returning to Lahore Whites for the final matches of his senior career in 2016.

In January 2007, Azmat made 92 not out for Lahore Ravi against Quetta in the Quaid-e-Azam Trophy, sharing a sixth-wicket partnership of 111 with Adnan Akmal. After moving to WAPDA, he became a regular middle-order batsman for the department. In December 2009, he and Bilal Khilji added an unbroken 219 for the sixth wicket against Pakistan Customs, with Azmat finishing unbeaten on 88. The following season, he scored 79 against Zarai Taraqiati Bank Limited as WAPDA pressed for a place in the Division One final.

Azmat's most notable first-class performance came in October 2011, when he scored a century in each innings against Sialkot in the 2011–12 Quaid-e-Azam Trophy. He made 101 in the first innings and followed it with an unbeaten 106 as WAPDA won by five wickets. In the same season, he scored another century, alongside Zulfiqar Babar's 81, as WAPDA took a substantial first-innings lead against Rawalpindi. Late in his career, playing for Lahore Whites in the 2016–17 Quaid-e-Azam Trophy, he scored 56 in the second innings against Karachi Whites.

Overall, Azmat played in 66 first-class matches in which he has scored 3,389 runs at a batting average of 38.95, making 17 half-centuries and 7 centuries.
