= Afghan cricket team in Ireland in 2012 =

Afghanistan cricket team against Ireland in 2012
	Ireland	Afghanistan
- Dates: 3 July – 12 July
Captains	Kevin O'Brien (first-class); William Porterfield (ODI)	Karim Sadiq

One Day International series
- Results: Ireland won the 2-match series 1–0

The Afghanistan national cricket team played the Ireland cricket team in Ireland in July 2012. The teams will play a four-day first-class match as part of the 2011-13 ICC Intercontinental Cup and two One Day Internationals (ODIs) as part of the 2011–13 ICC World Cricket League Championship. The Intercontinental Cup match will be played at Observatory Lane in Rathmines, while the two ODIs will be played at the Clontarf Cricket Club Ground in Dublin. Heading into the matches, Ireland led both the Intercontinental Cup and the World Cricket League Championship, while Afghanistan were second in the Intercontinental Cup and fifth in the World Cricket League Championship.

== Squads ==
Intercontinental Cup		ODIs	
Ireland	Afghanistan	Ireland	Afghanistan
Kevin O'Brien (c); John Anderson; Andrew Balbirnie; Alex Cusack; Trent Johnston; Rory McCann (wk); John Mooney; Paul Stirling; Max Sorensen; Stuart Thompson; Albert van der Merwe; Andrew White; Gary Wilson (wk); Ben Wylie	Karim Sadiq (c); Amir Mangal; Asghar Stanikzai; Dawlat Zadran; Gulbudeen Naib; Amir Hamza; Izatullah Dawlatzai; Javed Ahmadi; Mohammad Nabi; Mohammad Shahzad (wk); Najibullah Zadran; Shabir Noori; Samiullah Shenwari; Shapoor Zadran	William Porterfield (c); Alex Cusack; George Dockrell; Trent Johnston; Ed Joyce; John Mooney; Tim Murtagh; Kevin O'Brien; Niall O'Brien (wk); Paul Stirling; Max Sorensen; Stuart Thompson; Andrew White; Gary Wilson (wk)	Karim Sadiq (c); Afsar Zazai; Asghar Stanikzai; Dawlat Zadran; Gulbudeen Naib; Amir Hamza; Izatullah Dawlatzai; Javed Ahmadi; Mohammad Nabi; Mohammad Shahzad (wk); Noor-ul-Haq; Shabir Noori; Samiullah Shenwari; Shapoor Zadran

== World Cricket League Championship ==
=== 1st ODI ===
3 July 2012
(scorecard)

Ireland	v	Afghanistan

Match abandoned without a ball bowled
Clontarf Cricket Club Ground, Dublin
Umpires: Shaun George (RSA) and Richard Smith (Ire)

- Rescheduled to be played the following day, but poor weather ruled out play on the reserve day.

=== 2nd ODI ===
5 July 2012
(scorecard)

Ireland; 163 all out (47 overs)	v	Afghanistan; 104 all out (33.1 overs)
Ed Joyce 67 (124); Shapoor Zadran 3/20 (8 overs)		Najibullah Zadran 23 (32); Alex Cusack 3/17 (8 overs)

Ireland won by 59 runs
Clontarf Cricket Club Ground, Dublin
Umpires: Shaun George (RSA) and Richard Smith (Ire)

- Afghanistan won the toss and elected to field.

== Intercontinental Cup Match ==
9–12 July 2012
Scorecard

Afghanistan	v	Ireland
84 (29.1 overs); Gulbodin Naib 13 (10); Alex Cusack 4/31 (10 overs)		251/4d (60.1 overs); Gary Wilson 73 (100); Mohammad Nabi 1/24 (6.1 overs)
208/7 (67 overs); Javed Ahmadi 59 (94); Stuart Thompson 3/51 (12 overs)

Match drawn
Observatory Lane, Rathmines, Dublin, Ireland
Umpires: Shaun George (SA) and Richard Smith (Ire)

- Ireland won the toss and elected to field.
- No play on Days 1 and 2 due to rain.
- Points: Ireland 13, Afghanistan 7
