= Mohammad Nasim Baras =

Afghan cricketer

Personal information
- Full name: Nasim Baras
- Born: 30 May 1993 (age 33)
- Batting: Left-handed
- Bowling: Slow left-arm orthodox
- Role: Bowler

International information
- National side: Afghanistan (2015)
- T20I debut (cap 29): 28 November 2015 v Oman
- Last T20I: 30 November 2015 v Oman

Domestic team information
- Years: Team
- 2011–2012: Afghan Cheetahs
- 2013: Afghanistan

Career statistics
Competition	LA	T20
Matches	1	4
Runs scored	19	17
Batting average	19.00	8.50
100s/50s	0/0	0/0
Top score	19	13
Balls bowled	48	64
Wickets	1	3
Bowling average	45.00	28.00
5 wickets in innings	0	0
10 wickets in match	0	0
Best bowling	1/45	1/16
Catches/stumpings	0/–	0/–
Medal record
Men's Cricket
Representing Afghanistan
Asian Games
Silver medal – second place	2014 Incheon	Team
- Source: Cricinfo, 21 June 2013

Mohammad Nasim Baras (also Nasim Khan; born 30 March 1993) is an Afghan cricketer. Baras is a left-handed batsman who bowls slow left-arm orthodox.

Baras made his Twenty20 debut for the Afghan Cheetahs in the Faysal Bank Twenty-20 Cup against Faisalabad Wolves. He made a further appearance in that competition against Multan Tigers. He scored 17 runs in this two appearances, as well as taking two wickets at an average of 17.50.

He made his Twenty20 International debut on 28 November 2015 against Hong Kong.
