= Najeeb Tarakai =

Afghan cricketer (1991–2020)

Personal information
- Born: 2 February 1991; Kabul, Afghanistan
- Died: 6 October 2020 (aged 29); Jalalabad, Afghanistan
- Batting: Right-handed
- Bowling: Right-arm off break
- Role: Opening batsman

International information
- National side: Afghanistan (2014–2019)
- Only ODI (cap 42): 24 March 2017 v Ireland
- ODI shirt no.: 31
- T20I debut (cap 25): 16 March 2014 v Bangladesh
- Last T20I: 15 September 2019 v Bangladesh
- T20I shirt no.: 31 (previously 78)

Domestic team information
- Years: Team
- 2011/12: Afghan Cheetahs
- 2017: Boost Defenders
- 2017/18: Amo Sharks
- 2017/18–2019/20: Spin Ghar Tigers
- 2018/19–2019: Nangarhar Leopards

Career statistics
Competition	ODI	T20I	FC	LA
Matches	1	12	24	17
Runs scored	5	258	2,030	553
Batting average	5.00	21.50	47.20	32.52
100s/50s	0/0	0/1	6/10	1/3
Top score	5	90	200	121
Balls bowled	–	–	1,449	204
Wickets	–	–	21	4
Bowling average	–	–	38.47	36.75
5 wickets in innings	–	–	0	0
10 wickets in match	–	–	0	0
Best bowling	–	–	4/59	2/21
Catches/stumpings	0/–	3/–	21/–	9/–
Medal record
Men's Cricket
Representing Afghanistan
Asian Games
Silver medal – second place	2014 Incheon	Team
- Source: Cricinfo, 6 October 2020

Najeeb Tarakai (Pashto: نجیب تره کی) (2 February 1991 – 6 October 2020) was an Afghan cricketer who played international cricket for the Afghanistan team. He played twelve Twenty20 International matches and a One Day International fixture. Tarakai made his international debut at the 2014 ICC World Twenty20 tournament in Bangladesh. In domestic cricket, he scored more than 2,000 runs in first-class matches. He was part of the Afghan team that won the silver medal in the cricket tournament at the 2014 Asian Games.

== Domestic career ==
Tarakai made his Twenty20 debut for the Afghan Cheetahs in the Faysal Bank Twenty-20 Cup against Rawalpindi Rams. He played in the Cheetahs two other fixtures in that competition, against Faisalabad Wolves and Multan Tigers. In these three matches, he scored a total of 54 runs at an average of 18.00, with a high score of 34. In September 2018, he was named in Nangarhar's squad in the first edition of the Afghanistan Premier League tournament.

He was the leading run-scorer for Speen Ghar Region in the 2018 Ahmad Shah Abdali 4-day Tournament, with 719 runs in ten matches. He was also the leading run-scorer in the 2019 Ahmad Shah Abdali 4-day Tournament, with 670 runs in five matches, including four centuries in successive games.

== International career ==
He made his debut against Bangladesh in the 2014 ICC World Twenty20 tournament. He played two Twenty20 International (T20I) matches for Afghanistan in 2014.

On 10 March 2017 against Ireland, Tarakai scored 90 runs during the second T20I at Greater Noida. His match-winning performance along with the bowling performance by Rashid Khan, brought him his maiden man of the match award.

He made his One Day International (ODI) debut for Afghanistan against Ireland at the Greater Noida Sports Complex Ground on 24 March 2017.

== Death ==
On 2 October 2020, Tarakai sustained a severe head injury after being hit by a motorist while crossing a road in Jalalabad. He was taken to a hospital in Nangarhar and underwent surgery while in a coma. He died four days later on 6 October 2020, with his death being confirmed by the Afghanistan Cricket Board.
