= Aamer Hayat =

Pakistani cricketer (born 1982)

Mohammad Aamer Hayat
Personal information
- Born: 28 August 1982 (age 42); Lahore, Pakistan

Mohammad Aamer Hayat (born 28 August 1982) is a Pakistani former first-class cricketer active 2008–2012 who played for various Lahore-based teams. Aamer Hayat was a right-handed batsman and a right-arm medium-fast bowler.

Hayat took his maiden five-wicket haul in first-class cricket in November 2010. Hayat was one of Lahore Shalimar's opening bowlers against Lahore Ravi. He and his opening partner Emmad Ali took ten wickets between them on the first day, with Hayat taking figures of 6/34. He followed this up in the second innings with another six wickets, taking twelve for the match in total. This was the best match bowling figures he took in his career.
