= Afghan Cheetahs =

Personnel
- Captain: (Afghanistan) Mohammad Nabi
- Coach: (Afghanistan) Raees Ahmadzai
- Owner: Afghanistan Cricket Board

Team information
- Colours: /
- Founded: 2011
- Home ground: N/A

History
- Twenty-20 Cup wins: 0
- Official website: Afghan Cheetahs

The Afghan Cheetahs was a Twenty20 team established in 2011 from Afghanistan that played in Pakistan's domestic Faysal Bank Twenty-20 Cup in September/October 2011. The team was captained by Mohammad Nabi and coached by Raees Ahmadzai.

== Background ==
Despite the Afghanistan national cricket team being a member of the International Cricket Council in its own right, its recent success has seen it invited to take part in this competition in its full member neighbour. This is similar to other associate/affiliate members of the International Cricket Council. In Europe, the national teams of Denmark, Ireland, the Netherlands and Scotland have all at some point taken part in English domestic cricket. In Africa, Kenya has taken part in West Indian and Zimbabwean domestic cricket, while Namibia takes part in South Africa domestic cricket. Similarly, the national teams of Canada and the United States have also been invited to take part in West Indian domestic cricket. Such moves are seen as a way to give associate/affiliate members of the International Cricket Council access to regular cricket of a high standard, which they do not have access to in their own countries, by which to improve their skills.

== Fixtures and results ==
Comprising a mixture of national players and youth, the Afghan Cheetahs played three matches in the competition, losing all three. They lost to Rawalpindi Rams by 4 wickets, Faisalabad Wolves by 13 runs and Multan Tigers by 4 wickets. These defeats left the Cheetahs at the bottom of their group and eliminated them from the competition.

=== Scorecards ===
The following scorecards are the Afghan Cheetahs' results from their three matches in the Faysal Bank Twenty-20 Cup 2011–12:

28 September
20:00 (D/N)
Scorecard

Rawalpindi Rams (Pakistan); 163/6 (18.5 overs)	v	(Afghanistan) Afghan Cheetahs; 162/4 (20 overs)
Awais Zia 60 (41); Karim Sadiq 1/17 (4 overs)		Samiullah Shenwari 52 (32); Mohammad Rameez 2/41 (4 overs)

Rawalpindi Rams won by 4 wickets
National Stadium, Karachi
Umpires: Iqbal Butt and Shakeel Khan
Player of the match: Awais Zia (Rawalpindi Rams)

- Afghan Cheetahs won the toss and chose to bat

29 September
16:00 (D/N)
Scorecard

Faisalabad Wolves (Pakistan); 145/8 (20 overs)	v	(Afghanistan) Afghan Cheetahs; 132/9 (20 overs)
Mohammad Salman 32 (26); Abdur Rauf 2/25 (3 overs)		Gulbudeen Naib 68 (42); Mohammad Nabi 2/24 (4 overs)

Faisalabad Wolves won by 13 runs
National Stadium, Karachi
Umpires: Shozab Raza and Zameer Haider
Player of the match: Gulbudeen Naib (Afghan Cheetahs)

- Faisalabad Wolves won the toss and chose to bat

30 September
12:00
Scorecard

Multan Tigers (Pakistan); 135/6 (19.2 overs)	v	(Afghanistan) Afghan Cheetahs; 131/9 (20 overs)
Zain Abbas 54 (35); Naved Yasin 4/17 (4 overs)		Najib Taraki 34 (24); Mohammad Nabi 2/32 (4 overs)

Multan Tigers won by 4 wickets
National Stadium, Karachi
Umpires: Riazuddin and Saleem Badar
Player of the match: Naved Yasin (Multan Tigers)

- Afghan Cheetahs won the toss and chose to bat

== See also ==
- Asiatic cheetah, the animal which used to occur in Afghanistan
