= 2004–05 Quaid-e-Azam Trophy =

Cricket tournament

- Dates: 10 October 2004 – 1 January 2005
- Administrator(s): Pakistan Cricket Board
- Cricket format: First-class
- Tournament format(s): Round-robin and final
- Host(s): Pakistan
- Champions: Peshawar (2nd title)
- Participants: 11
- Matches: 56
- Official website: www.pcb.com.pk

The 2004–05 Quaid-e-Azam Trophy was one of two first-class domestic cricket competitions that were held in Pakistan during the 2004–05 season. It was the first edition of the Quaid-e-Azam Trophy under a new sponsorship agreement with ABN AMRO signed by the Pakistan Cricket Board. It was contested by eleven regional association teams (Note: The top level of domestic cricket in Pakistan was historically played by teams representing regional cricket associations and departments, which were owned and run by corporations, institutions or government departments.), with twelve departmental teams contesting the Patron's Trophy later in the season.

The competition was organised as a round-robin qualifying group stage of four-day matches, with the top two teams contesting a five-day final. Group matches took place between 10 October and 24 December 2004, with the final played from 28 December 2004 to 1 January 2005.

Peshawar won the trophy for the second time on the basis of having taken a first-innings lead in the final after the match against Faisalabad resulted in a draw when rain reduced play to just 28 overs during the final two days.

== Group stage ==
The top two teams in the round-robin group stage (highlighted) advanced to the final.

Team	Pld	W	L	D	A	Pts
Faisalabad	10	7	1	2	0	63
Peshawar	10	7	1	2	0	63
Lahore Blues	10	4	4	2	0	39
Sialkot	10	4	1	5	0	39
Karachi Whites	10	3	3	4	0	36
Rawalpindi	10	3	1	6	0	33
Lahore Whites	10	2	3	5	0	27
Karachi Blues	10	2	5	3	0	18
Multan	10	1	3	6	0	15
Hyderabad	10	0	4	6	0	9
Quetta	10	0	7	3	0	0

Position determined by total points, most matches won, fewest matches lost, followed by adjusted net run rate (matches with no result, i.e. those where both teams did not complete their first innings, were disregarded); matches finishing in a draw were decided on first innings scores, with points awarded as follows:
- Win = 9 points
- Win having trailed on first innings = 6 points
- Draw having led on first innings = 3 points
- Loss, draw having trailed on first innings, or draw with no result based on the first innings = 0 points

== Final ==
28 December 2004–1 January 2005
Scorecard

Faisalabad	v	Peshawar
226 (66.3 overs); Misbah-ul-Haq 75 (117); Riaz Afridi 4/57 (17.5 overs)		279 (76 overs); Shoaib Khan 108 (172); Shahid Nazir 5/67 (21 overs)
217/9d (69 overs); Ahmed Hayat 66* (79); Waqar Ahmed 4/109 (27 overs)		83/0 (23 overs); Rafatullah Mohmand 44* (67)

Match drawn; Peshawar win on first innings
Iqbal Stadium, Faisalabad
Umpires: Asad Rauf and Saleem Badar

- Peshawar won the toss and elected to field.
- No play was possible on day 4, and only 28 overs were bowled on day 5.
