= Mudassir and Brothers =

Nigerian textile company

- Type: Private
- Industry: Textile, Conglomerate
- Founded: 1997; 29 years ago
- Founder: Mudassir Idris Abubakar
- Headquarters: Kano, Kano State, Nigeria
- Key people: Mudassir Idris Abubakar (Managing Director); Abubakar Ali Bunawa (General Manager); Junaidu Idris Abubakar (Director); Umar Idris Abubakar (Director); Ali Idris Abubakar (Director)
- Brands: Empire Atampa, Super Conclusive, Florance, Flora, Ismile, Egypian Kamfala, Mudatex Java, Super Xperia
- Number of employees: 1200
- Website: mudatex.com

Mudassir and Brothers, also known as Mudatex, is a Nigerian multinational industrial conglomerate, and fashion fabric company that produces and distributes African wax prints for Nigeria and the West and Central African market founded by Mudassir Idris Abubakar. The company was founded in 1997, becoming the largest fabrics company to date in Nigeria. Mudassir and Brothers have a presence in eight Nigerian cities which include Kano, Kaduna, and Abuja and around 1,200 employees work for the company in Nigeria.

== History ==
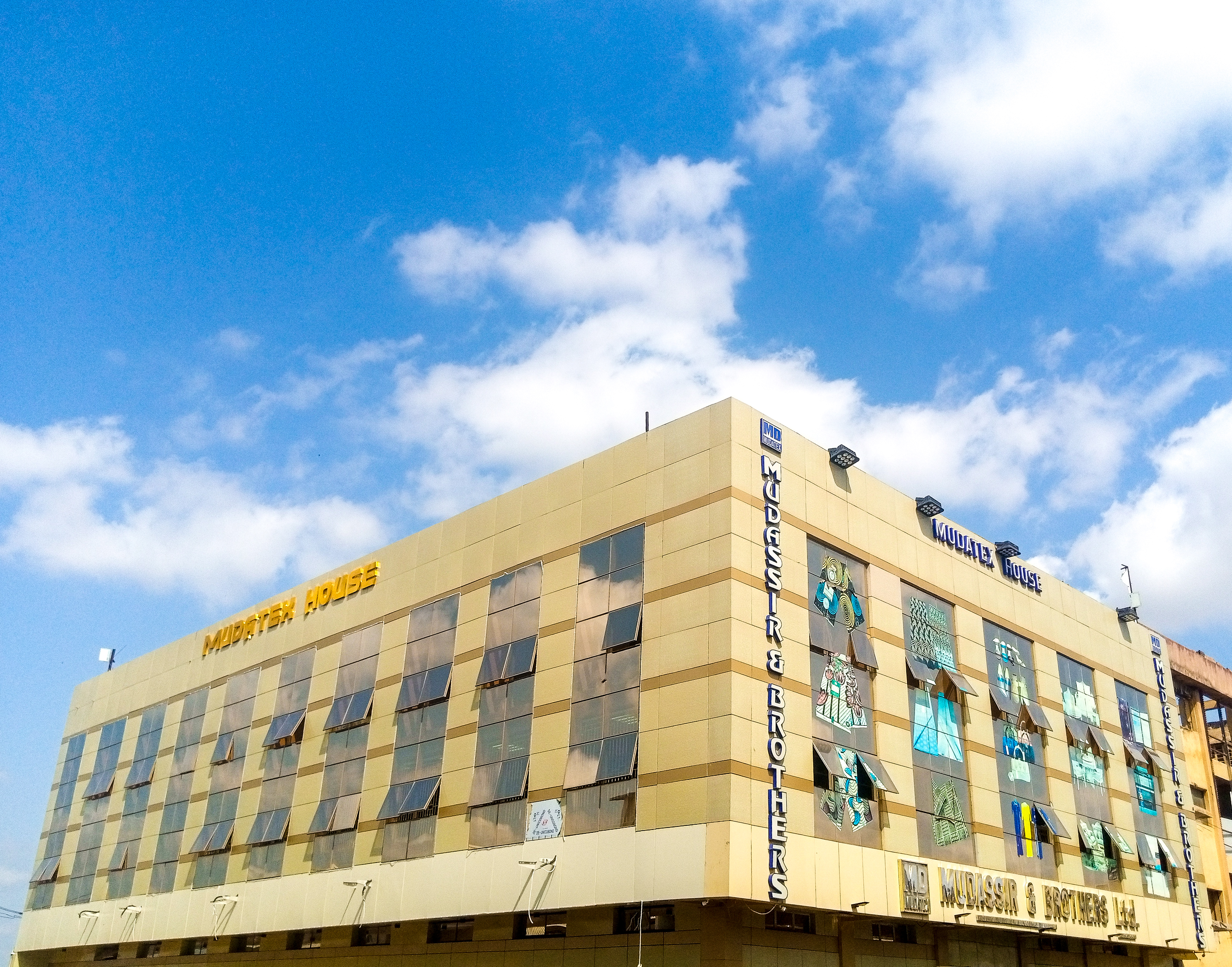
Mudassir and Brothers building

Mudassir and Brothers were founded in 1997, by Kano base entrepreneur Mudassir Idris Abubakar as a trading enterprise, importing fabrics, furniture, electronics, kitchenware, and other consumer goods for distribution in the Nigeria market. The company moved into the manufacturing of fashion fabrics in 2005 and furniture in 2007. Mudassir and Brothers moved into real estate business, building shopping malls and complex while venturing into many other sectors.

Mudassir and Brothers now own and operate three shopping malls in Kano and one each in Kaduna, Katsina, Sokoto, Gombe, Adamawa, and Abuja. In 2020, Mudassir and Brothers unveiled their flagship construction project to build the biggest ultra-modern and multi-purpose shopping mall at former Daula Hotel premises located at Murtala Muhammad Way, Kano which was approved by Kano State Executive Council.

In July 2020, Mudassir and Brothers unveiled a plan to build a textile factory in Kano State in their effort to curb the menace of unemployment in the State.

== Overview ==
In 1997, Mudassir Idris Abubakar established Mudassir and Brothers Limited and began trading as Mudatex Textiles with a presence in today popular Kantin Kwari Market in Kano metropolis selling fashion fabrics and other textile materials. Abubakar later expanded his business line to furniture and electronics. The company built its first complex in 2016 along Ibrahim Taiwo road, which is now Kano city's busiest business area.

=== Manufacturing ===
Mudassir and Brothers Limited commenced processes to establish a textile manufacturing company worth over $50 million in Kano State in 2019 to complement the policy of the Federal Government of Nigeria that was encouraging local production of qualitative goods to create wealth and job opportunities for 10,000 youths in Nigeria. In response to the construction project, Governor Abdullahi Umar Ganduje of Kano State approved the allocation of 22.5 hectares of land to Mudassir and Brothers Limited for the establishment of the textile.

Today, Mudassir and Brothers have become a diversified conglomerate company with headquarters in Kano, and interests in a range of sectors in West and Central Africa.

== COVID-19 response ==
In the wake of the Coronavirus pandemic, Mudassir and Brothers renovated an isolation center established by Kano State to support the government's fight against COVID-19, installing 20 beds in Dawakin Kudu isolation center, equipped with negative pressure ceiling and 6-bed Intensive Care Unit (ICU) with 6 ventilators. The company also shared food items in the State (Kano) to support low income earners during the 3-month lockdown period.
