= Modaser Zekria =

Afghan footballer

Personal information
- Date of birth: 25 June 1990 (age 36)
- Place of birth: Jalalabad, Democratic Republic of Afghanistan
- Height: 1.74 m (5 ft 9 in)
- Position: Midfielder

Team information
- Current team: Newroz FC

Senior career*
| Years | Team | Apps | (Gls) |
| 2010 | Värmdö IF | 19 | (0) |
| 2011 | Hammarby Talang FF | 24 | (2) |
| 2012–2013 | Enskede IK | 33 | (0) |
| 2014 | Forssa BK | 8 | (0) |
| 2014–2016 | IK Brage | 46 | (2) |
| 2017 | Boo FK | 2 | (0) |
| 2017 | IFK Aspudden-Tellus | 9 | (0) |
| 2018– | Newroz FC | | |

International career^{‡}
| 2015 | Afghanistan | 2 | (0) |
- * Club domestic league appearances and goals as of 13:27, 23 November 2019 (UTC) ‡ National team caps and goals as of 13:27, 23 November 2019 (UTC)

Modaser Zekria (born 25 June 1990) is an Afghan international footballer who plays for Swedish club Newroz FC, as a midfielder.

== Career ==
Born in Jalalabad, Zakaria has played club football in Sweden for Värmdö IF, Hammarby Talang FF, Enskede IK, Forssa BK, IK Brage, Boo FK, IFK Aspudden-Tellus and Newroz FC.

He earned two caps for the Afghanistan national team in 2015.
