= Mudassar Riaz =

Pakistani cricketer (born 1995)

Personal information
- Born: 2 September 1995 (age 31); Faisalabad, Pakistan
- Source: ESPNcricinfo, 27 December 2016

Mudassar Riaz (born 2 September 1995) is a Pakistani cricketer. He made his List A debut for Sui Northern Gas Pipelines Limited in the 2016–17 Departmental One Day Cup on 27 December 2016.
