= Mohammad Sami (Punjab cricketer) =

Pakistani cricketer (born 1984)

Personal information
- Born: 12 December 1984 (age 41); Faisalabad, Pakistan
- Source: Cricinfo, 28 November 2015

Mohammad Sami (born 12 December 1984) is a Pakistani first-class cricketer who played for Faisalabad cricket team.
