= Mudassir Ibrahim =

Nigerian politician

Mudassir Ibrahim Zawachiki

Member of the Kano State House of Assembly
- Constituency: Kumbotso Constituency

Personal details
- Born: Kano State, Nigeria
- Party: All ProgressivesCongress (APC)
- Occupation: Politician

Mudassir Ibrahim Zawachiki is a Nigerian politician who currently serves as the representative for the Kumbotso constituency at the Kano State House of Assembly.
