= Gulbadin Naib =

Afghan cricketer (born 1991)

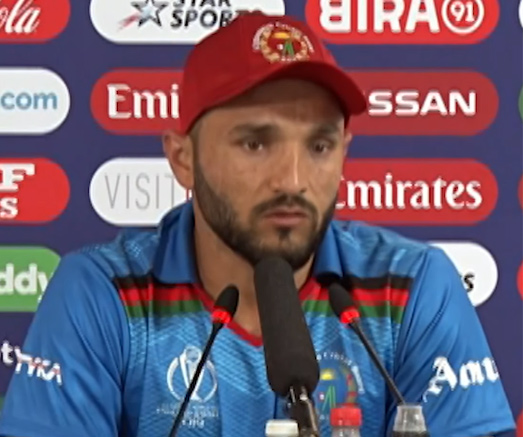
- Gulbadin Naib in 2019

Personal information
- Born: 4 June 1991 (age 35); Puli Alam, Logar, Republic of Afghanistan
- Batting: Right-handed
- Bowling: Right-arm fast-medium
- Role: Batting all-rounder

International information
- National side: Afghanistan (2011–present)
- ODI debut (cap 24): 9 August 2011 v Canada
- Last ODI: 28 February 2025 v Australia
- ODI shirt no.: 14 (previously 11)
- T20I debut (cap 15): 14 March 2012 v Netherlands
- Last T20I: 8 February 2026 v New Zealand
- T20I shirt no.: 14

Domestic team information
- Years: Team
- 2011/12: Afghan Cheetahs
- 2017: Boost Defenders
- 2018–present: Balkh Legends
- 2019: Sylhet Strikers
- 2024: Delhi Capitals
- 2025: Quetta Gladiators
- 2025: Lumbini Lions

Career statistics
Competition	ODI	T20I	FC	LA
Matches	89	75	5	136
Runs scored	1,332	945	313	2,389
Batting average	19.88	20.54	52.16	23.89
100s/50s	0/5	0/3	0/3	1/10
Top score	82*	57	88*	100
Balls bowled	2,883	649	460	4,490
Wickets	74	33	14	129
Bowling average	36.16	26.06	23.28	32.05
5 wickets in innings	1	0	1	1
10 wickets in match	0	0	0	0
Best bowling	6/43	4/20	5/29	6/43
Catches/stumpings	28/–	30/–	6/–	43/–
Medal record
Representing Afghanistan
Men's Cricket
Asian Games
Silver medal – second place	2010 Guangzhou	Team
Silver medal – second place	2014 Incheon	Team
Silver medal – second place	2022 Hangzhou	Team
- Source: ESPNcricinfo, 17 May 2025

Gulbadin Naib (Pashto: ګل‌بدین نایب) (born 4 June 1991) is an Afghan cricketer. An all-rounder, Naib bats right-handed and bowls right-arm fast-medium.

In April 2019, the Afghanistan Cricket Board (ACB) named Naib the team's new One Day International (ODI) captain ahead of the 2019 Cricket World Cup, replacing Asghar Afghan. However, following the Cricket World Cup, where Afghanistan lost all of their matches, Rashid Khan was named as the new captain of the Afghanistan cricket team across all three formats. Naib led Afghanistan to the silver medal in the 2022 Asian Games.

== Early life and career ==
Naib was born in Puli Alam in the Logar Province of Afghanistan. He made his debut for Afghanistan against Japan in the 2008 World Cricket League Division Five, where he made five appearances. He took part in the documentary Out of the Ashes which followed the team's preparation for the tournament and their lives back in Afghanistan; Naib is shown body building in a Kabul gym and stating Arnold Schwarzenegger to be one of his inspirations. Two years after the filming of the documentary, following which Naib lost his place in the Afghan team, he was selected as part of Afghanistan's squad for the 2010 Asian Games, playing a single match against Hong Kong. Afghanistan won the silver medal in the competition. He made his List A debut for Afghanistan when they became the first team to tour Pakistan since the 2009 attack on the Sri Lanka national cricket team. Naib played in two of the three unofficial One Day Internationals (ODIs) against Pakistan A.

== International career ==
Naib made his One Day International debut against Canada in the 2011–13 ICC Intercontinental Cup One-Day. Later in the tour, he made his Twenty20 debut against Trinidad and Tobago in the Cricket Canada Summer Festival, making a further appearance during that tournament, against Canada. Later in 2011, he played for the newly formed Afghan Cheetahs team in the Faysal Bank Twenty-20 Cup 2011-12, making three appearances in the competition against Rawalpindi Rams, Faisalabad Wolves and Multan Tigers. He scored his maiden Twenty20 half century during the tournament, scoring 68 from 42 balls against Faisalabad Wolves. In December 2011, his score of 57 runs from 50 balls in the final of the 2011 ACC Twenty20 Cup helped Afghanistan to an 8-run victory over Hong Kong, securing Afghanistan their third ACC Twenty20 Cup title.

Naib later featured in Afghanistan's first One Day International against a Full Member Test-playing nation when they played Pakistan at Sharjah in February 2012. Naib scored 7 runs in the match, before becoming one of Shahid Afridi's five wickets. Pakistan won the encounter by 7 wickets. He was selected as part of Afghanistan's fourteen man squad for the 2012 World Twenty20 Qualifier held in the United Arab Emirates in March 2012. During this tournament, Naib made his Twenty20 International (T20I) debut against the Netherlands, and made two further T20I appearances, as well as subsequently playing a further six Twenty20 matches against nations in the qualifier who themselves did not hold Twenty20 International status. He scored 86 runs in the qualifier, at an average of 13.50, with a high score of 26 not out. Shortly after the tournament, he featured in two ODIs against the Netherlands in the World Cricket League Championship.

In 2012, Naib was a member of Afghanistan's squad for their tour of Ireland as part of their Intercontinental Cup commitments. He played in both of the team's World Cricket League Championship ODIs against Ireland. Although the first match was abandoned due to rain, in the second match he claimed his maiden ODI wicket when he dismissed Niall O'Brien, and scored 19 runs from 23 balls before being dismissed by George Dockrell, Ireland winning the match by 59 runs. He also made his first-class debut during the tour in the Intercontinental Cup fixture, which saw Naib dismissed for 13 runs in his only innings of the match by Alex Cusack, while in Ireland's first-innings he took the wicket of Andrew Balbirnie to finish with figures of one for 33 from six overs. In August 2012, Naib featured in Afghanistan's second ODI against a full-member when they played Australia at Sharjah. In Australia's first-innings of 272/8, he bowled two overs which conceded 18 runs, and during the innings he ran out David Hussey. In Afghanistan's chase, he scored a quickfire 22 from 17 balls, which included three sixes, before he was dismissed by James Pattinson, Australia winning by 66 runs. During the match, Naib was named in Afghanistan's squad for the World Twenty20 in Sri Lanka in September 2012. He scored 44 against England, and was the only Afghan batsman to pass double figures as the English won by 119 runs.

In April 2019, he was named as the captain of Afghanistan's squad for the 2019 Cricket World Cup. In May, just ahead of the World Cup, in the second ODI against Ireland, Naib took six wickets for 43 runs. It was his first five-wicket haul and the third-best figures by a bowler for Afghanistan in ODIs. On 24 June 2019, in the match against Bangladesh, Naib played in his 100th international match for Afghanistan. In the same match, he also scored his 1,000th run in ODI cricket.

In September 2021, he was named in Afghanistan's squad for the 2021 ICC Men's T20 World Cup.

In May 2024, he was named in Afghanistan's squad for the 2024 ICC Men's T20 World Cup tournament. During Super 8 match against Australia during the 2024 ICC Men's T20 World Cup, Naib came in as eighth bowling option for Afghanistan and registered his career best bowling performance by picking 4 wickets conceding only 20 runs in his four over spell to propel Afghanistan to secure a historic win over the Australian team in international cricket. He also went onto become the first bowler in either Men's T20 World Cup or Men's ODI World Cup history to take four wickets in a World Cup innings after coming in as the 8th bowling option.

== T20 franchise career ==
In September 2018, Naib was named in Balkh's squad in the first edition of the Afghanistan Premier League tournament. The following month, he was named in the squad for the Sylhet Sixers team, following the draft for the 2018–19 Bangladesh Premier League.
