= Moinuddin (cricketer) =

Pakistani cricketer (born 1987)

Personal information
- Born: 20 September 1987 (age 39); Bahawalpur, Pakistan
- Source: Cricinfo, 28 November 2015

Moinuddin (born 20 September 1987) is a Pakistani first-class cricketer who plays for Multan cricket team.
