= Nauman Habib =

Pakistani cricketer (1979–2011)

Personal information
- Born: 13 September 1979; Peshawar, North-West Frontier Province, Pakistan
- Died: 11 October 2011 (aged 32); Hayatabad, Peshawar, Pakistan
- Batting: Right-handed
- Bowling: Right-arm medium
- Role: Bowler

Nauman Habib (Urdu: نعمان حبیب; 13 September 1979 – 11 October 2011) was a Pakistani cricketer. He played for Khan Research Laboratories, Peshawar Cricket Association, and the Peshawar Panthers. Habib played 63 first-class matches, 30 List A matches and 3 Twenty20 matches. He was found murdered on 11 October 2011, having been reported missing two days earlier.

== See also ==
- List of solved missing person cases (post-2000)
- List of unsolved murders (2000–present)
