= Rizwan Malik =

Pakistani cricketer (born 1990)

Personal information
- Born: 2 August 1990 (age 36); Gujranwala, Pakistan
- Source: Cricinfo, 29 November 2015

Rizwan Malik (born 2 August 1990) is a Pakistani first-class cricketer who played for Islamabad cricket team. Malik played in the 2021 T20 World Cup standing in for the injured Sohaib Maqsood, suffering from a bout of the flu during the tournament.
