= Hamza Paracha =

Pakistani cricketer (born 1988)

Personal information
- Born: 21 September 1988 (age 38); Lahore, Pakistan
- Source: Cricinfo, 28 November 2015

Hamza Paracha (born 21 September 1988) is a Pakistani first-class cricketer who played for Lahore cricket team.
