= Mohammad Rameez =

Pakistani cricketer (born 1990)

Personal information
- Born: 19 February 1990 (age 36); Rawalpindi, Pakistan
Medal record
Men's Cricket
Representing Pakistan
South Asian Games
Bronze medal – third place	2010 Dhaka	Team
- Source: Cricinfo, 14 November 2015

Mohammad Rameez (born 19 February 1990) is a Pakistani first-class cricketer who played for Rawalpindi cricket team.
