= Mohammad Zahid (cricketer, born 1985) =

Pakistani cricketer (born 1985)

Personal information
- Born: 20 November 1985 (age 40); Multan, Pakistan
- Source: Cricinfo, 28 November 2015

Mohammad Zahid (born 20 November 1985) is a Pakistani first-class cricketer who plays for Multan cricket team.
