= Naved Yasin =

Pakistani cricketer (born 1987)

Personal information
- Full name: Naved Ahmed Yasin
- Born: 15 July 1987 (age 39); Gaggu Mandi, Pakistan
- Batting: Left-handed
- Bowling: Slow left-arm orthodox
- Role: Batsman

Career statistics
Competition	FC	LA	T20
Matches	104	44	63
Runs scored	5,825	1,135	1,227
Batting average	39.62	31.52	29.92
100s/50s	16/28	1/6	0/6
Top score	173	101	69*
Balls bowled	206	210	114
Wickets	6	1	6
Bowling average	18.83	153.00	21.83
5 wickets in innings	1	0	0
10 wickets in match	0	0	0
Best bowling	5/36	1/44	4/17
Catches/stumpings	72/–	12/–	20/–
- Source: Cricinfo, 23 September 2021

Naved Yasin (born 15 July 1987) is a Pakistani cricketer. He has played in more than 100 first-class cricket matches since his debut in 2007, appearing domestically for several different teams, including Multan, State Bank of Pakistan, Khan Research Laboratories, Rawalpindi, and National Bank of Pakistan. He has also represented Pakistan at Under-19 and A-team levels.

Naved made his first-class debut for Multan against Hyderabad on 18 January 2007.
