= Shoaib Khan (cricketer, born 1978) =

Pakistani cricketer (born 1978)

Personal information
- Born: 27 July 1978 (age 48); Peshawar, Pakistan
- Batting: Right-handed
- Source: ESPNcricinfo, 7 November 2016

Shoaib Khan (born 27 July 1978) is a Pakistani former cricketer. He has played more than 140 first-class and 80 List A matches since 1999. In the 2003–04 Quaid-e-Azam Trophy, Khan scored 300 not out batting for Peshawar against Quetta.
