= List of Afghanistan Test cricket records =

Test cricket is the oldest form of cricket played at international level. A Test match is scheduled to take place over a period of five days, (Note: For the first 50 years of Test cricket matches were played over three or four days and until the 1930s some timeless Tests were played.) (Note: In October 2017, the ICC Board approved a trial of four-day Test cricket to run through until the 2019 Cricket World Cup.) and is played by teams representing full member nations of the International Cricket Council (ICC).

Afghanistan played their first test match in 2018, becoming the 12th test nation. Since then, they have played 13 Test matches, compiling a record of 4 wins, 8 defeats, and 1 draw.

This list of Afghanistan Test cricket records is based on the List of Test cricket records, but concentrates solely on records dealing with Afghanistan Test cricket team, and any cricketers who have played for that team.

== Key ==
The top five records are listed for each category, except for the team wins, losses, draws and ties and the partnership records. Tied records for fifth place are also included. Explanations of the general symbols and cricketing terms used in the list are given below. Specific details are provided in each category where appropriate. All records include matches played for Afghanistan only, and are correct as of June 2020.

Key
Symbol	Meaning
†	Player or umpire is currently active in Test cricket
*	Player remained not out or partnership remained unbroken
♠	Test cricket record
d	Innings was declared (e.g. 8/758d)
Date	Starting date of the Test match
Innings	Number of innings played
Matches	Number of matches played
Opposition	The team Afghanistan was playing against
Period	The time period when the player was active in Test cricket
Player	The player involved in the record
Venue	Test cricket ground where the match was played

== Team records ==
=== Team wins, losses, draws and ties ===
As of June 2025, Afghanistan has played 13 Test matches resulting in 4 victories, 8 defeats and 1 drawn match for a 30.76% winning percentage.

Opponent	Matches	Won	Lost	Drawn	Tied	NR	% Won
Australia	YTP						
Bangladesh	3	1	1	1	0	0	33.33
England	YTP						
India	2	0	2	0	0	0	0.00
Ireland	2	1	1	0	0	0	50.00
New Zealand	YTP						
Pakistan	YTP						
South Africa	YTP						
Sri Lanka	1	0	1	0	0	0	0.00
West Indies	1	0	1	0	0	0	0.00
Zimbabwe	5	2	2	1	0	0	40.00
Total	14	4	8	2	0	0	28.57
Last updated: 18 October 2026

=== First Test series wins ===
Opponent	Year of first Home win	Year of first Away win
Australia	YTP	YTP
Bangladesh	YTP	2019
England	YTP	YTP
India	YTP	-
Ireland	2019	YTP
New Zealand	YTP	
Pakistan	YTP	
South Africa	YTP	
Sri Lanka	YTP	-
West Indies	-	YTP
Zimbabwe	-	2024–25
Last updated: 6 January 2025

=== First Test match wins ===
Opponent	Home		Away	
Opponent	Venue	Year	Venue	Year
Australia	YTP		YTP	
Bangladesh	YTP		Chittagong	2019
England	YTP		YTP	
India	YTP		-	
Ireland	Dehradun	2019	YTP	
New Zealand	YTP			
Pakistan	YTP			
South Africa	YTP			
Sri Lanka	YTP		-	
West Indies	-		YTP	
Zimbabwe	Abu Dhabi	2021	Bulawayo	2025
Last updated: 6 January 2025

=== Team scoring records ===
==== Most runs in an innings ====
Rank	Score	Opposition	Venue	Date
1	699	Zimbabwe	Queens Sports Club, Bulawayo, Zimbabwe	26 December 2024
2	545/4d	Zimbabwe	Sheikh Zayed Cricket Stadium, Abu Dhabi, UAE	10 March 2021
3	514	Zimbabwe	Sharjah Cricket Stadium, Sharjah, UAE	5 November 2026
4	363	Zimbabwe	Queens Sports Club, Bulawayo, Zimbabwe	2 January 2025
5	346/8	Bangladesh	Sheikh Zayed Cricket Stadium, Abu Dhabi, UAE	9 October 2026
Last updated: 10 November 2026

==== Highest successful run chases ====
Rank	Score	Target	Opposition	Venue	Date
1	149/3	147	Ireland	Rajiv Gandhi International Cricket Stadium, Dehradun, India	15 March 2019
2	108/4	108	Zimbabwe	Sheikh Zayed Cricket Stadium, Abu Dhabi, UAE	10 March 2021
Last updated: 14 March 2021

==== Fewest runs in an innings ====
Rank	Score	Opposition	Venue	Date
1	103	India	M. Chinnaswamy Stadium, Bangalore, India	14 June 2018
2	109	India	M. Chinnaswamy Stadium, Bangalore, India	14 June 2018
3	112	India	Maharaja Yadavindra Singh International Cricket Stadium, New Chandigarh, India	6 June 2026
4	115	Bangladesh	Sher-e-Bangla National Cricket Stadium, Mirpur, Bangladesh	14 June 2023
5	120	West Indies	Ekana Cricket Stadium, Lucknow, India	27 November 2019
Last updated: 8 June 2026

==== Most runs conceded in an innings ====
Rank	Score	Opposition	Venue	Date
1	586	Zimbabwe	Queens Sports Club, Bulawayo, Zimbabwe	26 December 2024
2	564/8d	India	Maharaja Yadavindra Singh International Cricket Stadium, New Chandigarh, India	6 June 2026
3	523/5	Zimbabwe	Sharjah Cricket Stadium, Sharjah, UAE	5 November 2026
4	504	Zimbabwe	Sharjah Cricket Stadium, Sharjah, UAE	5 November 2026
5	474	India	M. Chinnaswamy Stadium, Bangalore, India	14 June 2018
Last updated: 10 November 2026

==== Fewest runs conceded in an innings ====
Rank	Score	Opposition	Venue	Date
1	172	Ireland	Rajiv Gandhi International Cricket Stadium, Dehradun, India	15 March 2019
2	173	Bangladesh	Zohur Ahmed Chowdhury Stadium, Chittagong, Bangladesh	5 September 2019
3	205	Bangladesh	Zohur Ahmed Chowdhury Stadium, Chittagong, Bangladesh	5 September 2019
4	205	Zimbabwe	Queens Sports Club, Bulawayo, Zimbabwe	2 January 2025
5	243	Zimbabwe	Queens Sports Club, Bulawayo, Zimbabwe	2 January 2025
Last updated: 6 January 2025

=== Result records ===
==== Greatest win margins (by runs) ====
Rank	Margin	Opposition	Venue	Date
1	224 runs	Bangladesh	Zohur Ahmed Chowdhury Stadium, Chittagong, Bangladesh	5 September 2019
2	72 runs	Zimbabwe	Queens Sports Club, Bulawayo, Zimbabwe	2 January 2025
Last updated: 6 January 2025

==== Greatest win margins (by wickets) ====
Rank	Margin	Opposition	Venue	Date
1	7 wickets	Ireland	Rajiv Gandhi International Cricket Stadium, Dehradun, India	15 March 2019
2	6 wickets	Zimbabwe	Sheikh Zayed Cricket Stadium, Abu Dhabi, UAE	10 March 2021
Last updated: 14 March 2021

==== Narrowest win margins (by runs) ====
Rank	Margin	Opposition	Venue	Date
1	72 runs	Zimbabwe	Queens Sports Club, Bulawayo, Zimbabwe	2 January 2025
2	224 runs	Bangladesh	Zohur Ahmed Chowdhury Stadium, Chittagong, Bangladesh	5 September 2019
Last updated: 6 January 2025

==== Narrowest win margins (by wickets) ====
Rank	Margin	Opposition	Venue	Date
1	6 wickets	Zimbabwe	Sheikh Zayed Cricket Stadium, Abu Dhabi, UAE	10 March 2021
2	7 wickets	Ireland	Rajiv Gandhi International Cricket Stadium, Dehradun, India	15 March 2019
Last updated: 14 March 2021

==== Greatest loss margins (by innings) ====
Rank	Margin	Opposition	Venue	Date
1	Innings and 300 runs	India	Maharaja Yadavindra Singh International Cricket Stadium, New Chandigarh, India	6 June 2026
2	Innings and 262 runs	India	M. Chinnaswamy Stadium, Bangalore, India	14 June 2018
3	Innings and 73 runs	Zimbabwe	Harare Sports Club, Harare, Zimbabwe	20 October 2025
Last updated: 8 June 2026

==== Greatest loss margins (by runs) ====
Rank	Margin	Opposition	Venue	Date
1	562 runs	Bangladesh	Sher-e-Bangla National Cricket Stadium, Mirpur, Bangladesh	14 June 2023
Last updated: 17 June 2023

==== Greatest loss margins (by 10 wickets) ====
Rank	Number of Defeats	Opposition	Most Recent Venue	Date
1	1	Zimbabwe	Sheikh Zayed Cricket Stadium, Abu Dhabi, UAE	2 March 2021
1	1	Sri Lanka	Sinhalese Sports Club Ground, Colombo, Sri Lanka	5 February 2024
Last updated: 05 February 2024

== Individual records ==
=== Batting records ===
==== Most career runs ====
Rank	Runs	Player	Matches	Innings	Average	100	50	Period
1	1,372	Rahmat Shah†	14	26	54.88	5	7	2018–2026
2	838	Hashmatullah Shahidi†	14	26	39.9	2	2	2018–2026
3	602	Ibrahim Zadran†	8	16	37.62	1	4	2019–2025
4	440	Asghar Afghan	6	10	44.00	1	3	2018–2021
5	378	Afsar Zazai†	10	17	23.62	1	0	2018–2026
Last updated: 10 November 2026

==== Most runs against each team ====
Opposition	Runs	Player	Matches	Innings	Period	Ref
Australia	YTP					
Bangladesh	297	Rahmat Shah†	3	6	2019–2026	
England	YTP					
India	91	Rahmat Shah†	2	4	2018–2026	
Ireland	183	Rahmat Shah†	2	4	2019–2024	
New Zealand	YTP					
Pakistan	YTP					
South Africa	YTP					
Sri Lanka	145	Rahmat Shah†	1	2	2024–2024	
West Indies	101	Javed Ahmadi†	1	2	2019–2019	
Zimbabwe	652	Rahmat Shah†	5	8	2021–2026	
Last updated: 10 November 2026.

==== Most runs in each batting position ====
Batting position	Batsman	Innings	Runs	Average	Test Career Span	Ref
Number 1	Ibrahim Zadran†	13	455	35.0	2019–2025	
Number 2	Abdul Malik†	9	149	16.55	2021–2026	
Number 3	Rahmat Shah†	18	966	53.66	2018–2025	
Number 4	Hashmatullah Shahidi†	15	705	54.23	2019–2025	
Number 5	Asghar Afghan	6	377	62.83	2019–2021	
Number 6	Afsar Zazai†	10	162	18.00	2019–2026	
Number 7	Karim Janat†	3	77	38.50	2023–2024	
Number 8	Rashid Khan†	7	130	18.57	2018–2025	
Number 9	Amir Hamza†	4	76	38.00	2019–2023	
Number 10	Yamin Ahmadzai†	9	51	5.66	2019–2025	
Number 11	Fareed Ahmad†	2	19	19.00	2025–2025	
Last updated: 8 June 2026.

==== Highest individual score ====
Rank	Runs	Player	Opposition	Venue	Date
1	246	Hashmatullah Shahidi	Zimbabwe	Queens Sports Club, Bulawayo, Zimbabwe	26 December 2024
2	234	Rahmat Shah	Zimbabwe	Queens Sports Club, Bulawayo, Zimbabwe	26 December 2024
3	200*	Hashmatullah Shahidi	Zimbabwe	Sheikh Zayed Cricket Stadium, Abu Dhabi, UAE	10 March 2021
4	164	Asghar Afghan	Zimbabwe	Sheikh Zayed Cricket Stadium, Abu Dhabi, UAE	10 March 2021
5	139	Rahmat Shah	Zimbabwe	Queens Sports Club, Bulawayo, Zimbabwe	2 January 2025
Last updated: 4 January 2025

==== Highest individual score – progression of record ====
Runs	Player	Opponent	Venue	Date
36*	Hashmatullah Shahidi	India	M. Chinnaswamy Stadium, Bangalore, India	14 June 2018
98	Rahmat Shah	Ireland	Rajiv Gandhi International Cricket Stadium, Dehradun, India	15 March 2019
102	Rahmat Shah	Bangladesh	Zohur Ahmed Chowdhury Stadium, Chittagong, Bangladesh	5 September 2019
200*	Hashmatullah Shahidi	Zimbabwe	Sheikh Zayed Cricket Stadium, Abu Dhabi, UAE	10 March 2021
234	Rahmat Shah	Zimbabwe	Queens Sports Club, Bulawayo, Zimbabwe	26 December 2024
246	Hashmatullah Shahidi	Zimbabwe	Queens Sports Club, Bulawayo, Zimbabwe	26 December 2024
Last updated: 30 December 2024

==== Highest individual score against each team ====
Opposition	Runs	Player	Venue	Date	Ref
Australia	YTP				
Bangladesh	102	Rahmat Shah	Zohur Ahmed Chowdhury Stadium, Chittagong, Bangladesh	5 September 2019	
England	YTP				
India	60	Rahmat Shah	Maharaja Yadavindra Singh International Cricket Stadium, New Chandigarh, India	6 June 2026	
Ireland	98	Rahmat Shah	Rajiv Gandhi International Cricket Stadium, Dehradun, India	15 March 2019	
New Zealand	YTP				
Pakistan	YTP				
South Africa	YTP				
Sri Lanka	114	Ibrahim Zadran	Sinhalese Sports Club Ground, Colombo, Sri Lanka	2 February 2024	
West Indies	62	Javed Ahmadi	Ekana Cricket Stadium, Lucknow, India	27 November 2019	
Zimbabwe	246	Hashmatullah Shahidi	Queens Sports Club, Bulawayo, Zimbabwe	26 December 2024	
Last updated: 30 December 2024

==== Highest career average ====
Rank	Average	Player	Innings	Runs	Not out	Period
1	54.88	Rahmat Shah†	26	1,72	1	2018–2026
2	44.00	Asghar Afghan	10	440	0	2018–2021
3	39.90	Hashmatullah Shahidi†	26	838	5	2018–2026
4	37.62	Ibrahim Zadran†	16	602	0	2019–2025
5	23.62	Afsar Zazai†	17	378	1	2018–2026
Qualification: 10 innings. Last updated: 10 November 2026

==== Highest Average in each batting position ====
Batting position	Batsman	Innings	Runs	Average	Span	Ref
Number 1	Ibrahim Zadran†	13	455	35.00	2019–2025	
Number 2	Javed Ahmadi	5	109	21.8	2018–2021	
Number 3	Rahmat Shah†	18	966	53.66	2018–2025	
Number 4	Hashmatullah Shahidi†	15	705	54.23	2019–2025	
Number 5	Asghar Afghan	6	377	62.83	2019–2021	
Number 6	Nasir Jamal†	5	74	18.50	2019–2024	
Number 7	Ismat Alam†	5	29	5.8	2025–2026	
Number 8	Rashid Khan†	7	130	18.57	2018–2025	
Number 9	Yamin Ahmadzai†	6	26	6.5	2018–2025	
Number 10	Yamin Ahmadzai†	10	51	5.1	2019–2026	
Number 11	Zahir Khan†	10	4	0.80	2019–2024	
Last updated: 18 October 2026. Qualification: Min 5 innings batted at position

==== Most half-centuries ====
Rank	Half centuries	Player	Innings	Runs	Period
1	5	Rahmat Shah†	21	970	2018–2025
2	4	Ibrahim Zadran†	14	541	2018–2024
3	3	Asghar Afghan	10	440	2018–2021
4	2	Hashmatullah Shahidi†	19	757	2018–2025
Last updated: 5 January 2025

==== Most centuries ====
Rank	Centuries	Player	Innings	Runs	Period
1	3	Rahmat Shah†	21	970	2018–2025
2	2	Hashmatullah Shahidi†	19	757	2018–2025
3	1	Ismat Alam†	2	101	2025–2025
3	1	Asghar Afghan	10	440	2018–2021
3	1	Afsar Zazai†	13	348	2018–2025
3	1	Ibrahim Zadran†	14	541	2019–2024
Last updated: 6 January 2025

==== Most double centuries ====
Rank	Double Centuries	Player	Innings	Runs	Period
1	2	Hashmatullah Shahidi†	19	757	2018–2024
2	1	Rahmat Shah†	21	970	2018–2024
Last updated: 5 January 2025

==== Most Sixes ====
Rank	Sixes	Player	Innings	Runs	Period
1	11	Asghar Afghan	10	440	2018–2021
2	6	Rahmat Shah†	21	970	2018–2025
3	5	Afsar Zazai†	13	348	2018–2025
4	4	Rashid Khan†	9	154	2018–2025
4	4	Ibrahim Zadran†	14	541	2019–2024
Last updated: 5 January 2025

==== Most Fours ====
Rank	Fours	Player	Innings	Runs	Period
1	117	Rahmat Shah†	21	970	2018–2025
2	85	Hashmatullah Shahidi†	19	757	2018–2025
3	64	Ibrahim Zadran†	14	541	2019–2024
4	37	Asghar Afghan	10	440	2018–2021
5	31	Afsar Zazai†	13	348	2018–2025
Last updated: 5 January 2025

==== Most runs in a series ====
Rank	Runs	Player	Matches	Innings	Series
1	392	Rahmat Shah	2	3	Afghanistan in Zimbabwe in 2024
2	272	Hashmatullah Shahidi	2	3	Afghanistan in Zimbabwe in 2024
3	215	Hashmatullah Shahidi	2	4	Zimbabwe v Afghanistan in UAE in 2021
4	208	Ibrahim Zadran	2	4	Zimbabwe v Afghanistan in UAE in 2021
5	191	Asghar Afghan	2	3	Zimbabwe v Afghanistan in UAE in 2021
Last updated: 5 January 2025

==== Most ducks in career ====
Rank	Ducks	Player	Matches	Innings	Period
1	5	Zahir Khan†	6	11	2019–2024
2	4	Nijat Masood†	3	6	2023–2024
2	4	Yamin Ahmadzai†	7	13	2018–2025
2	4	Rahmat Shah†	11	21	2018–2025
5	3	Mohammad Nabi	3	6	2018–2019
Last updated: 5 January 2025

== Bowling records ==
=== Most career wickets ===
Rank	Wickets	Player	Matches	Innings	Average	SR	Period
1	45	Rashid Khan†	6	11	20.44	41.4	2018–2025
2	21	Yamin Ahmadzai†	9	16	32.71	58.8	2018–2026
3	18	Amir Hamza	4	8	28.72	54.6	2019–2023
4	15	Zahir Khan†	6	10	46.60	60.0	2019–2024
5	13	Zia-ur-Rehman †	5	10	43.61	84.9	2024–2026
Last updated: 12 October 2026

==== Most wickets against each team ====
Opposition	Wickets	Player	Matches	Innings	Average	Period	Ref
Australia	YTP						
Bangladesh	11	Rashid Khan†	1	2	9.45	2019–2019	
England	YTP						
India	6	Mohammad Saleem†	1	1	23.33	2026–2026	
Ireland	7	Rashid Khan†	1	2	14.57	2019–2019	
New Zealand	YTP						
Pakistan	YTP						
South Africa	YTP						
Sri Lanka	4	Naveed Zadran†	1	2	28.25	2024–2024	
West Indies	6	Amir Hamza†	1	2	13.16	2019–2019	
Zimbabwe	22	Rashid Khan†	2	4	19.77	2021–2025	
Last updated: 7 June 2026

==== Best figures in an innings ====
Rank	Figures	Player	Opposition	Venue	Date
1	7/66	Rashid Khan	Zimbabwe	Queens Sports Club, Bulawayo, Zimbabwe	2 January 2025
2	7/97	Ziaur Rahman	Zimbabwe	Harare Sports Club, Harare, Zimbabwe	20 October 2025
3	7/137	Rashid Khan	Zimbabwe	Sheikh Zayed Cricket Stadium, Abu Dhabi, UAE	10 March 2021
4	6/49	Rashid Khan	Bangladesh	Zohur Ahmed Chowdhury Stadium, Chittagong, Bangladesh	5 September 2019
5	6/75	Amir Hamza	Zimbabwe	Sheikh Zayed Cricket Stadium, Abu Dhabi, UAE	2 March 2021
Last updated: 7 June 2026

==== Best bowling figures against each team ====
Opposition	Figures	Player	Venue	Date	Ref
Australia	YTP				
Bangladesh	6/49	Rashid Khan	Zohur Ahmed Chowdhury Stadium, Chittagong, Bangladesh	5 September 2019	
England	YTP				
India	6/140	Mohammad Saleem	Maharaja Yadavindra Singh International Cricket Stadium, New Chandigarh, India	6 June 2026	
Ireland	5/64	Zia-ur-Rehman	Tolerance Oval, Abu Dhabi, UAE	28 February 2024	
New Zealand	YTP				
Pakistan	YTP				
South Africa	YTP				
Sri Lanka	4/83	Naveed Zadran	Sinhalese Sports Club Ground, Colombo, Sri Lanka	2 February 2024	
West Indies	5/74	Amir Hamza	Ekana Cricket Stadium, Lucknow, India	27 November 2019	
Zimbabwe	7/66	Rashid Khan	Queens Sports Club, Bulawayo, Zimbabwe	2 January 2025	
Last updated: 7 June 2026

==== Best figures in a match ====
Rank	Figures	Player	Opposition	Venue	Date
1	11/104	Rashid Khan	Bangladesh	Zohur Ahmed Chowdhury Stadium, Chittagong, Bangladesh	5 September 2019
2	11/160	Rashid Khan	Zimbabwe	Queens Sports Club, Bulawayo, Zimbabwe	2 January 2025
3	11/275	Rashid Khan	Zimbabwe	Sheikh Zayed Cricket Stadium, Abu Dhabi, UAE	11 March 2021
4	7/102	Rashid Khan	Ireland	Rajiv Gandhi International Cricket Stadium, Dehradun, India	15 March 2019
5	6/79	Amir Hamza	West Indies	Ekana Cricket Stadium, Lucknow, India	27 November 2019
Last updated: 6 January 2025

==== Best career average ====
Rank	Average	Player	Wickets	Runs	Balls	Period
1	20.44	Rashid Khan†	45	920	1,864	2018–2025
2	28.12	Yamin Ahmadzai†	16	450	849	2018–2025
3	28.72	Amir Hamza†	18	517	984	2019–2023
4	31.75	Mohammad Nabi	8	254	546	2018–2019
5	36.72	Zia-ur-Rehman†	11	404	792	2024–2025
Qualification: 500 balls. Last updated: 5 January 2025

==== Best career economy rate ====
Rank	Economy rate	Player	Wickets	Runs	Balls	Period
1	2.79	Mohammad Nabi	8	254	546	2018–2019
2	2.96	Rashid Khan†	45	920	1,864	2018–2025
3	3.06	Zia-ur-Rehman†	11	404	792	2024–2025
4	3.15	Amir Hamza†	18	517	984	2019–2023
5	3.18	Yamin Ahmadzai†	16	450	849	2018–2025
Qualification: 500 balls. Last updated: 6 January 2025

==== Best career strike rate ====
Rank	Strike rate	Player	Wickets	Runs	Balls	Period
1	41.4	Rashid Khan†	45	920	1,864	2018–2025
2	53.0	Yamin Ahmadzai†	16	450	849	2018–2025
3	54.6	Amir Hamza†	18	517	984	2019–2023
4	60.0	Zahir Khan†	15	699	900	2019–2023
5	68.2	Mohammad Nabi	8	254	546	2018–2019
Last updated: 6 January 2025

==== Most five-wicket hauls in an innings ====
Rank	Five-wicket hauls	Player	Innings	Balls	Wickets	Period
1	5	Rashid Khan†	11	1,864	45	2018–2025
2	2	Amir Hamza†	8	984	18	2019–2023
3	1	Nijat Masood†	6	419	9	2023–2024
3	1	Zia-ur-Rehman†	8	792	11	2024–2025
Last updated: 6 January 2025

==== Most ten-wicket hauls in a match ====
Rank	Ten-wicket hauls	Player	Matches	Balls	Wickets	Period
1	3	Rashid Khan†	6	1,864	45	2018–2025
Last updated: 6 January 2025

==== Worst figures in an innings ====
Rank	Figures	Player	Overs	Opposition	Venue	Date
1	0/115	Nangeyalia Kharote	23.0	India	Maharaja Yadavindra Singh International Cricket Stadium, New Chandigarh, India	6 June 2026
2	0/90	Zia-ur-Rehman	28.0	Sri Lanka	Sinhalese Sports Club Ground, Colombo, Sri Lanka	2 February 2024
3	0/83	Nijat Masood	12.5	Bangladesh	Sher-e-Bangla National Cricket Stadium, Mirpur, Bangladesh	14 June 2023
4	0/67	Azmatullah Omarzai	22.0	India	Maharaja Yadavindra Singh International Cricket Stadium, New Chandigarh, India	6 June 2026
5	0/62	Yamin Ahmadzai	24.0	Zimbabwe	Harare Sports Club, Harare, Zimbabwe	20 October 2025
Last updated: 8 June 2026

==== Worst figures in a match ====
Rank	Figures	Player	Overs	Opposition	Venue	Date
1	0/102	Zia-ur-Rehman	31.0	Sri Lanka	Sinhalese Sports Club Ground, Colombo, Sri Lanka	2 February 2024
2	0/81	Karim Janat	19.0	Bangladesh	Sher-e-Bangla National Cricket Stadium, Mirpur, Bangladesh	14 June 2023
3	0/57	Mohammad Saleem	12.1	Sri Lanka	Sinhalese Sports Club Ground, Colombo, Sri Lanka	2 February 2024
4	0/55	Wafadar Momand	16.0	Ireland	Rajiv Gandhi International Cricket Stadium, Dehradun, India	15 March 2019
5	0/32	Yamin Ahmadzai	11.0	West Indies	Ekana Cricket Stadium, Lucknow, India	27 November 2019
Last updated:5 February 2024

==== Most wickets in a series ====
Rank	Wickets	Player	Matches	Series
1	11	Rashid Khan	1	Afghanistan tour of Bangladesh in 2019
1	11	Rashid Khan	1	Zimbabwe v Afghanistan in UAE in 2021
1	11	Rashid Khan	1	Afghanistan tour of Zimbabwe in 2024–25
4	10	Amir Hamza	2	Zimbabwe v Afghanistan in UAE in 2021
5	7	Rashid Khan	1	Ireland v Afghanistan in India in 2019
Last updated: 6 January 2025

== Wicket-keeping records ==
=== Most career dismissals ===
Rank	Dismissals	Player	Matches	Innings	Catches	Stumping	Dis/Inn	Period
1	20	Afsar Zazai†	8	15	19	1	1.333	2018–2025
2	6	Ikram Ali Khil†	2	4	5	1	1.500	2019–2024
3	2	Rahmanullah Gurbaz†	1	2	2	0	1.000	2024–2024
Last updated: 6 January 2025

==== Most career catches ====
Rank	Catches	Player	Matches	Innings	Period
1	19	Afsar Zazai†	8	15	2018–2025
2	5	Ikram Ali Khil†	2	4	2019–2024
3	2	Rahmanullah Gurbaz†	1	2	2024–2024
Last updated: 6 January 2025

==== Most career stumpings ====
Rank	Stumpings	Player	Matches	Innings	Period
1	1	Ikram Ali Khil†	2	4	2019–2024
1	1	Afsar Zazai†	8	15	2018–2025
Last updated: 6 January 2025

==== Most dismissals in an innings ====
Rank	Dismissals	Player	Opposition	Venue	Date
1	4	Afsar Zazai	Zimbabwe	Queens Sports Club, Bulawayo, Zimbabwe	26 December 2024
1	4	Afsar Zazai	Zimbabwe	Queens Sports Club, Bulawayo, Zimbabwe	2 January 2025
3	3	Ikram Ali Khil	Ireland	Rajiv Gandhi International Cricket Stadium, Dehradun, India	15 March 2019
4	2	Afsar Zazai	India	M. Chinnaswamy Stadium, Bangalore, India	14 June 2018
4	2	Ikram Ali Khil	Ireland	Rajiv Gandhi International Cricket Stadium, Dehradun, India	15 March 2019
4	2	Afsar Zazai	Zimbabwe	Sheikh Zayed Cricket Stadium, Abu Dhabi, UAE	10 March 2021
4	2	Afsar Zazai	Zimbabwe	Sheikh Zayed Cricket Stadium, Abu Dhabi, UAE	10 March 2021
4	2	Afsar Zazai	Bangladesh	Sher-e-Bangla National Cricket Stadium, Mirpur, Bangladesh	14 June 2023
Last updated: 4 January 2025

==== Most dismissals in a match ====
Rank	Dismissals	Player	Opposition	Venue	Date
1	5	Ikram Ali Khil	Ireland	Rajiv Gandhi International Cricket Stadium, Dehradun, India	15 March 2019
2	4	Afsar Zazai	Zimbabwe	Sheikh Zayed Cricket Stadium, Abu Dhabi, UAE	10 March 2021
2	4	Afsar Zazai	Zimbabwe	Queens Sports Club, Bulawayo, Zimbabwe	26 December 2024
2	4	Afsar Zazai	Zimbabwe	Queens Sports Club, Bulawayo, Zimbabwe	2 January 2025
5	2	Afsar Zazai	India	M. Chinnaswamy Stadium, Bangalore, India	14 June 2018
5	2	Afsar Zazai	Bangladesh	Zohur Ahmed Chowdhury Stadium, Chittagong, Bangladesh	5 September 2019
5	2	Afsar Zazai	West Indies	Ekana Cricket Stadium, Lucknow, India	27 November 2019
5	2	Afsar Zazai	Bangladesh	Sher-e-Bangla National Cricket Stadium, Mirpur, Bangladesh	14 June 2023
Last updated: 6 January 2025

==== Most dismissals in a series ====
Rank	Dismissals	Player	Matches	Innings	Series
1	8	Afsar Zazai	2	4	Afghanistan in Zimbabwe in 2024
2	5	Ikram Ali Khil	1	2	Afghanistan v Ireland in India in 2019
3	4	Afsar Zazai	2	4	Afghanistan v Zimbabwe in UAE in 2021
4	2	Afsar Zazai	1	1	Afghanistan in India in 2018
4	2	Afsar Zazai	1	2	Afghanistan in Bangladesh in 2019
4	2	Afsar Zazai	1	2	West Indies v Afghanistan in India in 2019
4	2	Afsar Zazai	1	2	Afghanistan in Bangladesh in 2023
Last updated: 4 January 2025

== Fielding records ==
=== Most career catches ===
Rank	Catches	Player	Matches	Innings	Ct/Inn	Period
1	11	Ibrahim Zadran†	7	14	0.785	2019–2024
2	8	Rahmat Shah†	11	21	0.380	2018–2025
3	7	Abdul Malik†	4	8	0.875	2021–2025
4	4	Hashmatullah Shahidi†	10	19	0.210	2019–2019
4	4	Ihsanullah †	3	6	0.666	2019–2019
4	4	Nasir Jamal†	5	10	0.400	2019–2023
Last updated: 6 January 2025

==== Most catches in a series ====
Rank	Catches	Player	Matches	Innings	Series
1	4	Ibrahim Zadran	1	2	Afghanistan in Bangladesh in 2023
2	3	Ibrahim Zadran	1	2	Afghanistan in Bangladesh in 2019
2	3	Abdul Malik	2	4	Afghanistan in Zimbabwe in 2024
4	2	8 Afghanistan players on 11 occasions.			
Last updated: 6 January 2025

== Other records ==
=== Most career matches ===
Rank	Matches	Player	Runs	Wkts	Period
1	13	Rahmat Shah†	1,155	1	2018–2026
1	13	Hashmatullah Shahidi†	796	-	2018–2026
3	10	Afsar Zazai†	378	-	2018–2026
4	9	Yamin Ahmadzai†	77	21	2018–2026
5	8	Ibrahim Zadran†	602	1	2019–2025
Last updated: 12 October 2026

==== Most consecutive career matches ====
Rank	Matches	Player	Period
1	6	Asghar Afghan	2018-2021
1	6	Rahmat Shah	2018-2021
3	5	Yamin Ahmadzai	2018-2021
3	5	Afsar Zazai	2018-2021
3	5	Hashmatullah Shahidi	2018-2021
Last updated: 3 June 2018

==== Most matches as captain ====
Rank	Matches	Player	Won	Lost	Tied	Draw	%W	%L	Period
1	7	Hashmatullah Shahidi	1	5	0	1	14.28	71.42	2023–2026
2	4	Asghar Afghan	2	2	0	0	50	50	2018–2021
3	2	Rashid Khan	1	1	0	0	50	50	2019–2019
4	1	Rahmat Shah†	0	0	0	1	0	0	2026–2026
Last updated: 18 October 2026

==== Most man of the match awards ====
Rank	M.O.M. Awards	Player	Matches	Period
1	2	Rashid Khan†	6	2018–2025
1	2	Hashmatullah Shahidi†	10	2018–2025
2	1	Rahmat Shah†	11	2018–2025
Last updated: 6 January 2025

==== Most man of the series awards ====
Rank	M.O.S. Awards	Player	Matches	Period
1	1	Rahmat Shah†	11	2018–2025
Last updated: 6 January 2025

==== Youngest players on Debut ====
Rank	Age	Player	Opposition	Venue	Date
1	17 years and 78 days	Mujeeb ur Rahman	India	M. Chinnaswamy Stadium, Bangalore, India	14 June 2018
2	17 years and 164 days	Waqar Salamkheil	Ireland	Rajiv Gandhi International Cricket Stadium, Dehradun, India	15 March 2019
3	17 years and 267 days	Ibrahim Zadran	Bangladesh	Zohur Ahmed Chowdhury Stadium, Chittagong, Bangladesh	5 September 2019
4	18 years and 167 days	Ikram Ali Khil	Ireland	Rajiv Gandhi International Cricket Stadium, Dehradun, India	15 March 2019
5	18 years and 239 days	Abdul Wasi	Zimbabwe	Sheikh Zayed Cricket Stadium, Abu Dhabi, UAE	2 March 2021
Last updated: 14 March 2021

==== Oldest players on Debut ====
Rank	Age	Player	Opposition	Venue	Date
1	35 years and 207 days	Noor Ali Zadran	Sri Lanka	Sinhalese Sports Club Ground, Colombo, Sri Lanka	2 February 2024
2	33 years and 164 days	Mohammad Nabi	India	M. Chinnaswamy Stadium, Bangalore, India	14 June 2018
3	31 years and 155 days	Mohammad Shahzad	India	M. Chinnaswamy Stadium, Bangalore, India	14 June 2018
4	30 years and 283 days	Sharafuddin Ashraf	Zimbabwe	Harare Sports Club, Harare, Zimbabwe	20 October 2025
5	30 years and 170 days	Asghar Afghan	India	M. Chinnaswamy Stadium, Bangalore, India	14 June 2018
Last updated: 8 June 2026

==== Oldest players ====
Rank	Age	Player	Opposition	Venue	Date
1	35 years and 233 days	Noor Ali Zadran	Ireland	Tolerance Oval, Abu Dhabi, UAE	28 February 2024
2	34 years and 247 days	Mohammad Nabi	Bangladesh	Zohur Ahmed Chowdhury Stadium, Chittagong, Bangladesh	5 September 2019
3	34 years and 76 days	Yamin Ahmadzai†	Bangladesh	Sheikh Zayed Cricket Stadium, Abu Dhabi, UAE	9 October 2026
4	33 years and 95 days	Rahmat Shah†	Bangladesh	Sheikh Zayed Cricket Stadium, Abu Dhabi, UAE	9 October 2026
5	33 years and 74 days	Asghar Afghan	Zimbabwe	Sheikh Zayed Cricket Stadium, Abu Dhabi, UAE	10 March 2021
Last updated: 18 October 2026

== Partnership records ==
=== Highest partnerships by wicket ===
Wicket	Runs	First batsman	Second batsman	Opposition	Venue	Date
1st wicket	106	Ibrahim Zadran	Noor Ali Zadran	Sri Lanka	Sinhalese Sports Club Ground, Colombo, Sri Lanka	2 February 2024
2nd wicket	206	Sediqullah Atal	Rahmanullah	Zimbabwe	Sharjah Cricket Stadium, Sharjah, UAE	5 November 2026
3rd wicket	364	Hashmatullah Shahidi	Rahmat Shah	Zimbabwe	Queens Sports Club, Bulawayo, Zimbabwe	26 December 2024
4th wicket	307	Hashmatullah Shahidi	Asghar Afghan	Zimbabwe	Sheikh Zayed Cricket Stadium, Abu Dhabi, UAE	10 March 2021
5th wicket	117*	Hashmatullah Shahidi	Nasir Jamal	Zimbabwe	Sheikh Zayed Cricket Stadium, Abu Dhabi, UAE	10 March 2021
6th wicket	81	Asghar Afghan	Afsar Zazai	Bangladesh	Zohur Ahmed Chowdhury Stadium, Chittagong, Bangladesh	5 September 2019
7th wicket	132	Rahmat Shah	Ismat Alam	Zimbabwe	Queens Sports Club, Bulawayo, Zimbabwe	2 January 2025
8th wicket	92	Rahmat Shah	Zia-ur-Rehman	Zimbabwe	Sharjah Cricket Stadium, Sharjah, UAE	5 November 2026
9th wicket	38	Yamin Ahmadzai	Ismat Alam	Zimbabwe	Queens Sports Club, Bulawayo, Zimbabwe	2 January 2025
10th wicket	27	Zia-ur-Rehman	Fareed Ahmad	Zimbabwe	Queens Sports Club, Bulawayo, Zimbabwe	2 January 2025
Last updated: 10 November 2026

=== Highest partnerships by runs ===
Wicket	Runs	First batsman	Second batsman	Opposition	Venue	Date
3rd wicket	361*	Rahmat Shah	Hashmatullah Shahidi	Zimbabwe	Queens Sports Club, Bulawayo, Zimbabwe	26 December 2024
4th wicket	307	Asghar Afghan	Hashmatullah Shahidi	Zimbabwe	Sheikh Zayed Cricket Stadium, Abu Dhabi, UAE	10 March 2021
4th wicket	211	Afsar Zazai	Hashmatullah Shahidi	Zimbabwe	Queens Sports Club, Bulawayo, Zimbabwe	26 December 2024
2nd wicket	206	Sediqullah Atal	Rahmanullah	Zimbabwe	Sharjah Cricket Stadium, Sharjah, UAE	5 November 2026
2nd wicket	139	Rahmat Shah	Ihsanullah	Ireland	Rajiv Gandhi International Cricket Stadium, Dehradun, India	15 March 2019
Last updated: 10 November 2026

=== Highest overall partnership runs by a pair ===
Rank	Runs	Innings	Players	Highest	Average	100/50	span
1	698	10	Hashmatullah Shahidi & Rahmat Shah †	361*	77.55	2/1	2018–2026
2	359	3	Asghar Afghan & Hashmatullah Shahidi	307	119.66	1/0	2018–2021
3	285	8	Ibrahim Zadran & Rahmat Shah †	108	35.62	1/2	2019–2024
4	229	4	Afsar Zazai & Hashmatullah Shahidi †	211	57.25	1/0	2018–2024
5	204	7	Hashmatullah Shahidi & Ibrahim Zadran †	65	29.14	0/2	2019–2025
An asterisk (*) signifies an unbroken partnership (i.e. neither of the batsmen was dismissed before either the end of the allotted overs or the required score being reached). Last updated: 8 June 2026

== Umpiring records ==
=== Most matches umpired ===
Rank	Matches	Umpire	Period
1	2	Ahmed Shah Pakteen	2021–2021
Last updated: 14 March 2021
