= Afghan cricket team in Bangladesh in 2023 =

International cricket tour

| | Bangladesh | Afghanistan |
- Dates: 14 June – 16 July 2023
| Captains | Litton Das (Test); Tamim Iqbal (ODIs) (Note: Litton Das captained Bangladesh in the second and third ODIs.); Shakib Al Hasan (T20Is) | Hashmatullah Shahidi (Test & ODIs); Rashid Khan (T20Is) |

Test series
- Result: Bangladesh won the 1-match series 1–0
| Most runs | Najmul Hossain Shanto (270) | Afsar Zazai (42) |
| Most wickets | Shoriful Islam (5); Ebadot Hossain (5) | Nijat Masood (5) |

One Day International series
- Results: Afghanistan won the 3-match series 2–1
| Most runs | Litton Das (96) | Rahmanullah Gurbaz (173) |
| Most wickets | Shoriful Islam (4); Shakib Al Hasan (4) | Fazalhaq Farooqi (8) |
- Player of the series: Fazalhaq Farooqi (Afg)

Twenty20 International series
- Results: Bangladesh won the 2-match series 2–0
| Most runs | Towhid Hridoy (66) | Mohammad Nabi (70) |
| Most wickets | Shakib Al Hasan (4); Taskin Ahmed (4) | Karim Janat (3); Mujeeb Ur Rahman (3); Azmatullah Omarzai (3) |
- Player of the series: Shakib Al Hasan (Ban)

The Afghanistan cricket team toured Bangladesh in June and July 2023 to play one Test, three One Day International (ODI) and two Twenty20 International (T20I) matches. The International Cricket Council (ICC) confirmed this FTP (Future Tours Program) tour in their press release.

Initially, Afghanistan were scheduled to play two Tests, three ODIs and three T20Is in the series. However, on 11 May 2023, a Test and a T20I was dropped from the itinerary, due to scheduling problems. On 17 May 2023, Bangladesh Cricket Board (BCB) confirmed the dates and venues for the series.

Bangladesh won the only Test by 546 runs, the biggest Test victory for Bangladesh in terms of runs. It was also the biggest Test win for any team, in terms of runs, in the 21st century.

Afghanistan won the first ODI match by 17 runs according to the DLS method after the match was interrupted due to rain. A day after the match, Bangladesh's ODI captain Tamim Iqbal announced his retirement from international cricket, and Litton Das was named as the stand-in captain for the final two ODI matches. In the 2nd ODI, Afghanistan won by 142 runs courtesy of a record-breaking opening partnership, helping them to seal their first ever ODI series win against Bangladesh. Bangladesh went on to win the third ODI by a comprehensive margin of 7 wickets with 159 balls to spare and eventually lost the series by 2–1 margin.

Bangladesh won the first T20I by 2 wickets in a thrilling way, chasing 154, which was their highest successful run chase against Afghanistan in T20I. Bangladesh also won the 2nd T20I by 6 wickets and won the series by 2–0 margin, their first ever T20I series win against Afghanistan.

== Squads ==
| Bangladesh | | | Afghanistan | | |
| Test | ODIs | T20Is | Test | ODIs | T20Is |
|---|---|---|---|---|---|
| Litton Das (c, wk); Khaled Ahmed; Taskin Ahmed; Mehidy Hasan; Musfik Hasan; Zakir Hasan (wk); Ebadot Hossain; Shahadat Hossain; ~~Tamim Iqbal~~; Mahmudul Hasan Joy; Mominul Haque; Mushfiqur Rahim (wk); Najmul Hossain Shanto; Shoriful Islam; Taijul Islam | Tamim Iqbal (c); Taskin Ahmed; Litton Das (wk); Mehidy Hasan; Afif Hossain; Ebadot Hossain; Towhid Hridoy; Hasan Mahmud; Mushfiqur Rahim (wk); Mustafizur Rahman; Mohammad Naim; Shakib Al Hasan; Najmul Hossain Shanto; Shoriful Islam; Taijul Islam; Rony Talukdar (wk) | Shakib Al Hasan (c); Nasum Ahmed; Taskin Ahmed; Litton Das (wk); Mehidy Hasan; Afif Hossain; ~~Ebadot Hossain~~; Rishad Hossain; Shamim Hossain; Towhid Hridoy; Hasan Mahmud; Mustafizur Rahman; Najmul Hossain Shanto; Shoriful Islam; Rony Talukdar (wk) | Hashmatullah Shahidi (c); Rahmat Shah (vc); Abdul Malik; Yamin Ahmadzai; Ikram Alikhil (wk); Amir Hamza; Mohammad Ibrahim; Nasir Jamal; Karim Janat; Zahir Khan; Nijat Masood; Izharulhaq Naveed; Bahir Shah; Ibrahim Zadran; Afsar Zazai (wk) | Hashmatullah Shahidi (c); Abdul Rahman; Ikram Alikhil (wk); Fazalhaq Farooqi; Rahmanullah Gurbaz (wk); Riaz Hassan; Rashid Khan; Wafadar Momand; Mujeeb Ur Rahman; Mohammad Nabi; Izharulhaq Naveed; Azmatullah Omarzai; Mohammad Saleem; Rahmat Shah; Shahidullah; Sayed Shirzad; Ibrahim Zadran; Najibullah Zadran; Zia-ur-Rehman | Rashid Khan (c); Fareed Ahmad; Noor Ahmad; Sediqullah Atal; Fazalhaq Farooqi; Rahmanullah Gurbaz (wk); Karim Janat; Nijat Masood; Wafadar Momand; Mohammad Nabi; ~~Naveen-ul-Haq~~; Azmatullah Omarzai; Mujeeb Ur Rahman; Mohammad Shahzad (wk); Ibrahim Zadran; Najibullah Zadran; Hazratullah Zazai |

Afghanistan named Azmatullah Omarzai, Sayed Shirzad, Noor Ali Zadran and Zia-ur-Rehman as reserves in their Test squad.

Ahead of the Test match, Tamim Iqbal was ruled out of the match with a lower back pain. After Tamim Iqbal retired from international cricket during the ODI series, Rony Talukdar was added as a replacement in Bangladesh's ODI squad for the remaining two ODIs.

Naveen-ul-Haq was ruled out of the T20I series with a knee injury, and Nijat Masood was named as his replacement. Ebadot Hossain too was ruled out of Bangladesh's T20I squad due to a knee injury.

== Only Test ==
14–17 June 2023
Scorecard

| Bangladesh | v | Afghanistan |
| 382 (86 overs); Najmul Hossain Shanto 146 (175); Nijat Masood 5/79 (16 overs) | | 146 (39 overs); Afsar Zazai 36 (40); Ebadot Hossain 4/47 (10 overs) |
| 425/4d (80 overs); Najmul Hossain Shanto 124 (151); Zahir Khan 2/112 (23 overs) | | 115 (33 overs); Rahmat Shah 30 (73); Taskin Ahmed 4/37 (9 overs) |

Bangladesh won by 546 runs
Sher-e-Bangla National Cricket Stadium, Dhaka
Umpires: Chris Brown (NZ) and Paul Reiffel (Aus)
Player of the match: Najmul Hossain Shanto (Ban)

- Afghanistan won the toss and elected to field.
- 11 overs, 17 overs and 20 overs of play was lost on Day 1, Day 2 and Day 3 respectively due to bad light.
- Karim Janat, Nijat Masood and Bahir Shah (Afg) all made their Test debuts.
- Litton Das captained Bangladesh in Tests for the first time.
- Nijat Masood (Afg) became the first Afghan and overall twenty-second bowler to take a wicket with his first ball in Tests.
- Nijat Masood (Afg) took his first five-wicket haul in Tests.
- Najmul Hossain Shanto became the second batter for Bangladesh to score centuries in both innings of a Test.
- Hashmatullah Shahidi (Afg) was replaced by Bahir Shah as a concussion substitute on the third day of the Test.
- This was Bangladesh's biggest margin of victory in a Test in terms of runs and overall third biggest Test win in terms of runs.

== ODI series ==
=== 1st ODI ===
5 July 2023
14:00 (D/N)
Scorecard

| Bangladesh; 169/9 (43 overs) | v | Afghanistan; 83/2 (21.4 overs) |
| Towhid Hridoy 51 (69); Fazalhaq Farooqi 3/24 (8.4 overs) | | Ibrahim Zadran 41* (58); Shakib Al Hasan 1/9 (5 overs) |

Afghanistan won by 17 runs (DLS method)
Zohur Ahmed Chowdhury Stadium, Chittagong
Umpires: Adrian Holdstock (SA) and Sharfuddoula (Ban)
Player of the match: Fazalhaq Farooqi (Afg)

- Afghanistan won the toss and elected to field.
- The match was reduced to 43 overs per side due to rain.
- Rain prevented any further play.
- Mohammad Saleem (Afg) made his ODI debut.

=== 2nd ODI ===
8 July 2023
14:00 (D/N)
Scorecard

| Afghanistan; 331/9 (50 overs) | v | Bangladesh; 189 (43.2 overs) |
| Rahmanullah Gurbaz 145 (125); Shakib Al Hasan 2/50 (10 overs) | | Mushfiqur Rahim 69 (85); Fazalhaq Farooqi 3/22 (7.2 overs) |

Afghanistan won by 142 runs
Zohur Ahmed Chowdhury Stadium, Chittagong
Umpires: Richard Illingworth (Eng) and Gazi Sohel (Ban)
Player of the match: Rahmanullah Gurbaz (Afg)

- Bangladesh won the toss and elected to field.
- Mushfiqur Rahim became the first player from Bangladesh to play 250 ODIs.
- Rahmanullah Gurbaz and Ibrahim Zadran's 1st wicket partnership was the biggest partnership for any wicket for Afghanistan in ODIs in terms of runs (256).

=== 3rd ODI ===
11 July 2023
14:00 (D/N)
Scorecard

| Afghanistan; 126 (45.2 overs) | v | Bangladesh; 129/3 (23.3 overs) |
| Azmatullah Omarzai 56 (71); Shoriful Islam 4/21 (9 overs) | | Litton Das 53* (60); Fazalhaq Farooqi 2/26 (5 overs) |

Bangladesh won by 7 wickets
Zohur Ahmed Chowdhury Stadium, Chittagong
Umpires: Adrian Holdstock (SA) and Masudur Rahman (Ban)
Player of the match: Shoriful Islam (Ban)

- Afghanistan won the toss and elected to bat.
- Abdul Rahman and Zia-ur-Rehman (Afg) both made their ODI debuts.

== T20I series ==
=== 1st T20I ===
14 July 2023
18:00 (D/N)
Scorecard

| Afghanistan; 154/7 (20 overs) | v | Bangladesh; 157/8 (19.5 overs) |
| Mohammad Nabi 54* (40); Shakib Al Hasan 2/27 (4 overs) | | Towhid Hridoy 47* (32); Karim Janat 3/15 (1.5 overs) |

Bangladesh won by 2 wickets
Sylhet International Cricket Stadium, Sylhet
Umpires: Masudur Rahman (Ban) and Gazi Sohel (Ban)
Player of the match: Towhid Hridoy (Ban)

- Bangladesh won the toss and elected to field.
- Karim Janat (Afg) took his first hat-trick in T20Is.

=== 2nd T20I ===
16 July 2023
18:00 (D/N)
Scorecard

| Afghanistan; 116/7 (17 overs) | v | Bangladesh; 119/4 (16.1 overs) |
| Azmatullah Omarzai 25 (21); Taskin Ahmed 3/33 (4 overs) | | Litton Das 35 (36); Azmatullah Omarzai 2/17 (3 overs) |

Bangladesh won by 6 wickets (DLS method)
Sylhet International Cricket Stadium, Sylhet
Umpires: Tanvir Ahmed (Ban) and Sharfuddoula (Ban)
Player of the match: Shakib Al Hasan (Ban)

- Bangladesh won the toss and elected to field.
- The match was reduced to 17 overs per side due to rain. Bangladesh were set a revised target of 119 runs from 17 overs.
- Wafadar Momand (Afg) made his T20I debut.
