= Afghan cricket team in India in 2026 =

International cricket tour

	India	Afghanistan
- Dates: 6 – 20 June 2026
Captains	Shubman Gill	Hashmatullah Shahidi

Test series
- Result: India won the 1-match series 1–0
Most runs	Shubman Gill (126)	Rahmat Shah (73)
Most wickets	Manav Suthar (7)	Mohammad Saleem (6)

One Day International series
- Results: India won the 3-match series 3–0
Most runs	Shubman Gill (238)	Rahmanullah Gurbaz (148)
Most wickets	Gurnoor Brar (7)	Nangialai Kharoti (4); Rashid Khan (4)
- Player of the series: Shubman Gill (Ind)

The Afghanistan cricket team toured India in June 2026 to play the India cricket team. The tour consisted of one Test and three One Day International (ODI) matches. In March 2026, the Board of Control for Cricket in India (BCCI) confirmed the fixtures for the tour, as a part of the 2026 home international season.

== Squads ==
India		Afghanistan	
Test	ODIs	Test	ODIs
Shubman Gill (c); KL Rahul (vc); Gurnoor Brar; Harsh Dubey; Yashasvi Jaiswal; Dhruv Jurel (wk); Prasidh Krishna; Devdutt Padikkal; Rishabh Pant (wk); Nitish Kumar Reddy; Sai Sudharsan; Mohammed Siraj; Washington Sundar; Manav Suthar; Kuldeep Yadav	Shubman Gill (c); Shreyas Iyer (vc); Gurnoor Brar; Harsh Dubey; Ishan Kishan (wk); ~~Virat Kohli~~; Yashasvi Jaiswal; Prasidh Krishna; ~~Hardik Pandya~~; KL Rahul (wk); Harshit Rana; Nitish Kumar Reddy; Rohit Sharma; Arshdeep Singh; Washington Sundar; Kuldeep Yadav; Prince Yadav	Hashmatullah Shahidi (c); Qais Ahmad; Ikram Alikhil (wk); Sharafuddin Ashraf; Sediqullah Atal; Rahmanullah Gurbaz; Nangialai Kharoti; Abdul Malik; Azmatullah Omarzai; Ziaur Rahman; Mohammad Saleem; Bilal Sami; Rahmat Shah; Rahmanullah Zadran; Afsar Zazai (wk)	Hashmatullah Shahidi (c); Ikram Alikhil (wk); Sediqullah Atal; Allah Ghazanfar; Rahmanullah Gurbaz (wk); Rashid Khan; Nangialai Kharoti; Fareed Malik; Mohammad Nabi; Azmatullah Omarzai; Ziaur Rahman; Darwish Rasooli; Bilal Sami; Rahmat Shah; Ibrahim Zadran

Virat Kohli was ruled out of the ODI series after suffering a hamstring injury and Yashasvi Jaiswal was named as the replacement. Hardik Pandya was ruled out as well due to injury. On 19 June 2026, Harshit Rana was added to the squad for the 3rd ODI, however he did not play the match.

== Only Test ==
6–8 June 2026
Scorecard

India	v	Afghanistan
564/8d (127 overs); Shubman Gill 126 (177); Mohammad Saleem 6/140 (27 overs)		152 (58.4 overs); Rahmat Shah 60 (135); Manav Suthar 6/33 (22 overs)
		112 (35.5 overs) (f/o); Sediqullah Atal 42 (80); Washington Sundar 4/36 (11 overs)

India won by an innings and 300 runs
Maharaja Yadavindra Singh International Cricket Stadium, Mullanpur
Umpires: Richard Illingworth (Eng) and Sharfuddoula (Ban)
Player of the match: Manav Suthar (Ind)

- India won the toss and elected to bat.
- This was the first Test to be played at this venue.
- Manav Suthar (Ind) and Nangialai Kharoti (Afg) both made their Test debuts.
- Mohammad Saleem (Afg) and Manav Suthar (Ind) both took their maiden five-wicket hauls in Tests.
- Rahmat Shah (Afg) scored his 1,000th run in Tests.
- This was India's largest victory by an innings in Tests.
- Afghanistan suffered their largest defeat by an innings in Tests.

== ODI series ==
=== 1st ODI ===
13 June 2026
13:30 (D/N)
Scorecard

Afghanistan; 194 (24.5 overs)	v	India; 195/3 (22.5 overs)
Rahmanullah Gurbaz 102 (51); Gurnoor Brar 3/27 (4.5 overs)		Shubman Gill 84* (66); Rashid Khan 1/37 (5 overs)

India won by 7 wickets
Himachal Pradesh Cricket Association Stadium, Dharamshala
Umpires: Chris Gaffaney (NZ) and Rohan Pandit (Ind)
Player of the match: Shubman Gill (Ind)

- India won the toss and elected to field.
- The match was reduced to 25 overs per side due to rain.
- Gurnoor Brar, Harsh Dubey (Ind) and Ziaur Rahman (Afg) all made their ODI debuts.
- This was the first-ever ODI series between the two countries.
- Rohit Sharma (Ind) scored 16,000 runs as an opener in international cricket.

=== 2nd ODI ===
17 June 2026
13:30 (D/N)
Scorecard

India; 402 (49.5 overs)	v	Afghanistan; 232 (44.3 overs)
Shubman Gill 154 (110); Nangialai Kharoti 4/76 (10 overs)		Rahmat Shah 79 (89); Arshdeep Singh 3/45 (9 overs)

India won by 170 runs
Ekana Cricket Stadium, Lucknow
Umpires: Richard Illingworth (Eng) and Virender Sharma (Ind)
Player of the match: Shubman Gill (Ind)

- Afghanistan won the toss and elected to field.
- Prince Yadav (Ind) and Darwish Rasooli (Afg) both made their ODI debuts.
- Ishan Kishan (Ind) scored his 1,000th run in ODIs.
- Shreyas Iyer (Ind) scored his 3,000th run in ODIs.

=== 3rd ODI ===
20 June 2026
13:30 (D/N)
Scorecard

Afghanistan; 218 (44.2 overs)	v	India; 224/1 (28.4 overs)
Hashmatullah Shahidi 102 (131); Prasidh Krishna 5/23 (8.2 overs)		Yashasvi Jaiswal 110* (86); Mohammad Nabi 1/47 (7.4 overs)

India won by 9 wickets
M. A. Chidambaram Stadium, Chennai
Umpires: Chris Gaffaney (NZ) and Rohan Pandit (Ind)
Player of the match: Prasidh Krishna (Ind)

- Afghanistan won the toss and elected to bat.
- Prasidh Krishna (Ind) took his maiden five-wicket haul in ODIs.
- Hashmatullah Shahidi (Afg) scored his maiden century in ODIs.
