= Sri Lankan cricket team against Afghanistan in the UAE in 2025–26 =

International cricket tour

	Afghanistan	Sri Lanka
- Date: TBD
Captains	Hashmatullah Shahidi (ODIs); Ibrahim Zadran (T20Is)	

One Day International series

Twenty20 International series

The Sri Lanka cricket team was scheduled to tour the United Arab Emirates in March 2026 to play the Afghanistan cricket team. The tour was consisted of three One Day International (ODI) and three Twenty20 International (T20I) matches. In February 2026, the Afghanistan Cricket Board (ACB) confirmed the fixtures for the tour.

The series, scheduled to begin on 13 March 2026 in Sharjah, was postponed due to the Iran war. Revised dates are to be announced following further consultations.

== Squads ==
Afghanistan		Sri Lanka	
ODIs	T20Is	ODIs	T20Is
Hashmatullah Shahidi (c); Rahmat Shah (vc); Fareed Ahmad; Ikram Alikhil (wk); Sediqullah Atal; Allah Ghazanfar; Rahmanullah Gurbaz (wk); Rashid Khan; Nangialai Kharoti; Mohammad Nabi; Azmatullah Omarzai; Darwish Rasooli; Bilal Sami; Zia Ur Rahman; Ibrahim Zadran	Ibrahim Zadran (c); Rahmanullah Gurbaz (wk); Fareed Ahmad; Noor Ahmad; Abdullah Ahmadzai; Sharafuddin Ashraf; Sediqullah Atal; Rashid Khan; Mohammad Nabi; Azmatullah Omarzai; Mujeeb Ur Rahman; Noor Rahman (wk); Zia Ur Rahman; Darwish Rasooli; Shahidullah		

== T20I series ==
=== 1st T20I ===
TBD

Afghanistan	v	Sri Lanka

Sharjah Cricket Stadium, Sharjah

=== 2nd T20I ===
TBD

Afghanistan	v	Sri Lanka

Sharjah Cricket Stadium, Sharjah

=== 3rd T20I ===
TBD

Afghanistan	v	Sri Lanka

Sharjah Cricket Stadium, Sharjah

== ODI series ==
=== 1st ODI ===
TBD

Afghanistan	v	Sri Lanka

Dubai International Cricket Stadium, Dubai

=== 2nd ODI ===
TBD

Afghanistan	v	Sri Lanka

Dubai International Cricket Stadium, Dubai

=== 3rd ODI ===
TBD

Afghanistan	v	Sri Lanka

Dubai International Cricket Stadium, Dubai
