= Afghan cricket team in Zimbabwe in 2024–25 =

International cricket tour

	Zimbabwe	Afghanistan
- Dates: 11 December 2024 – 6 January 2025
Captains	Craig Ervine (Tests & ODIs); Sikandar Raza (T20Is)	Hashmatullah Shahidi (Tests & ODIs); Rashid Khan (T20Is)

Test series
- Result: Afghanistan won the 2-match series 1–0
Most runs	Craig Ervine (254)	Rahmat Shah (392)
Most wickets	Blessing Muzarabani (9)	Rashid Khan (11)
- Player of the series: Rahmat Shah (Afg)

One Day International series
- Results: Afghanistan won the 3-match series 2–0
Most runs	Sean Williams (76)	Sediqullah Atal (156)
Most wickets	Trevor Gwandu (3); Newman Nyamhuri (3)	Allah Mohammad Ghazanfar (9)
- Player of the series: Sediqullah Atal (Afg)

Twenty20 International series
- Results: Afghanistan won the 3-match series 2–1
Most runs	Brian Bennett (107)	Azmatullah Omarzai (75)
Most wickets	Trevor Gwandu (5)	Rashid Khan (9)
- Player of the series: Naveen-ul-Haq (Afg)

The Afghanistan cricket team toured Zimbabwe in December 2024 and January 2025 to play the Zimbabwe cricket team. The tour consisted of two Tests, three One Day Internationals (ODI) and three Twenty20 International (T20I) matches. In October 2024, Zimbabwe Cricket (ZC) confirmed the fixtures for the tour.

On 29 November, Zimbabwe Cricket rescheduled the series.

== Squads ==
Zimbabwe			Afghanistan		
Tests	ODIs	T20Is	Tests	ODIs	T20Is
Craig Ervine (c); Brian Bennett; Ben Curran; Johnathan Campbell; Takudzwa Chataira; Joylord Gumbie (wk); Trevor Gwandu; Takudzwanashe Kaitano; Tadiwanashe Marumani (wk); Brandon Mavuta; Nyasha Mayavo; Blessing Muzarabani; Dion Myers; Richard Ngarava; Newman Nyamhuri; Victor Nyauchi; Sikandar Raza; Sean Williams	Craig Ervine (c); Brian Bennett; Ben Curran; Joylord Gumbie (wk); Trevor Gwandu; Tinotenda Maposa; Tadiwanashe Marumani (wk); Wellington Masakadza; Tashinga Musekiwa; Blessing Muzarabani; Dion Myers; Richard Ngarava; Newman Nyamhuri; Victor Nyauchi; Sikandar Raza; Sean Williams	Sikandar Raza (c); Faraz Akram; Brian Bennett; Ryan Burl; Trevor Gwandu; Takudzwanashe Kaitano; Wesley Madhevere; Tinotenda Maposa; Tadiwanashe Marumani (wk); Wellington Masakadza; Tashinga Musekiwa; Blessing Muzarabani; Dion Myers; Richard Ngarava; Newman Nyamhuri	Hashmatullah Shahidi (c); Rahmat Shah (vc); Bashir Ahmad; Fareed Ahmad; Yamin Ahmadzai; Ikram Alikhil (wk); Ismat Alam; Sediqullah Atal; Allah Mohammad Ghazanfar; Riaz Hassan; Rashid Khan; Zahir Khan; Abdul Malik; Azmatullah Omarzai; Zia-ur-Rehman; Shahidullah; Bahir Shah; Zahir Shehzad; Naveed Zadran; Afsar Zazai (wk)	Hashmatullah Shahidi (c); Rahmat Shah (vc); Fareed Ahmad; Ikram Alikhil (wk); Sediqullah Atal; Fazalhaq Farooqi; Allah Mohammad Ghazanfar; ~~Rahmanullah Gurbaz (wk)~~; Mohammad Ishaq (wk); Rashid Khan; Nangialai Kharoti; Abdul Malik; Mohammad Nabi; Gulbadin Naib; Azmatullah Omarzai; ~~Mujeeb Ur Rahman~~; Darwish Rasooli; Bilal Sami; Naveed Zadran	Rashid Khan (c); Fareed Ahmad; Noor Ahmad; Zubaid Akbari; Sediqullah Atal; Fazalhaq Farooqi; Rahmanullah Gurbaz (wk); Naveen-ul-Haq; Mohammad Ishaq (wk); Karim Janat; Nangialai Kharoti; Mohammad Nabi; Gulbadin Naib; Azmatullah Omarzai; Mujeeb Ur Rahman; Darwish Rasooli; Hazratullah Zazai

Afghanistan also named Nasir Jamal, Ziaur Rehman, and Mohammad Ibrahim as reserve players for the Test series. On 17 December, Rahmanullah Gurbaz was ruled out of the ODI series due to a grade 2B quadriceps along with a hip flexor injury with Mohammad Ishaq named as his replacement. Additionally Mujeeb Ur Rahman was rested from the ODI series due to recovery process from injury. On 24 December, Rashid Khan was ruled out of the first Test due to his personal reasons. 25 December, Allah Mohammad Ghazanfar and Shahidullah were added into the Test squad.

On 25 December, Takudzwa Chataira was ruled out of the first Test due to suffered from right-side strain during practice, with Victor Nyauchi named as his replacement.

== T20I series ==
=== 1st T20I ===
11 December 2024
13:30
Scorecard

Afghanistan; 144/6 (20 overs)	v	Zimbabwe; 145/6 (20 overs)
Karim Janat 54* (49); Richard Ngarava 3/28 (4 overs)		Brian Bennett 49 (49); Naveen-ul-Haq 3/33 (4 overs)

Zimbabwe won by 4 wickets
Harare Sports Club, Harare
Umpires: Iknow Chabi (Zim) and Percival Sizara (Zim)
Player of the match: Brian Bennett (Zim)

- Afghanistan won the toss and elected to bat.
- Mohammad Nabi (Afg) played in his 300th international match.

=== 2nd T20I ===
13 December 2024
13:30
Scorecard

Afghanistan; 153/6 (20 overs)	v	Zimbabwe; 103 (17.4 overs)
Darwish Rasooli 58 (42); Ryan Burl 2/16 (3 overs)		Sikandar Raza 35 (30); Naveen-ul-Haq 3/19 (4 overs)

Afghanistan won by 50 runs
Harare Sports Club, Harare
Umpires: Forster Mutizwa (Zim) and Langton Rusere (Zim)
Player of the match: Darwish Rasooli (Afg)

- Afghanistan won the toss and elected to bat.

=== 3rd T20I ===
14 December 2024
13:30
Scorecard

Zimbabwe; 127 (19.5 overs)	v	Afghanistan; 128/7 (19.3 overs)
Brian Bennett 31 (24); Rashid Khan 4/27 (4 overs)		Azmatullah Omarzai 34 (37); Blessing Muzarabani 2/19 (4 overs); Sikandar Raza 2/19 (4 overs)

Afghanistan won by 3 wickets
Harare Sports Club, Harare
Umpires: Iknow Chabi (Zim) and Forster Mutizwa (Zim)
Player of the match: Azmatullah Omarzai (Afg)

- Afghanistan won the toss and elected to field.

== ODI series ==
=== 1st ODI ===
17 December 2024
09:30
Scorecard

Zimbabwe; 44/5 (9.2 overs)	v	Afghanistan
Ben Curran 15 (22); Azmatullah Omarzai 4/18 (4.2 overs)

No result
Harare Sports Club, Harare
Umpires: Chris Brown (NZ) and Langton Rusere (Zim)

- Afghanistan won the toss and elected to field.
- The match was reduced to 28 overs per side due to rain.
- Rain prevented any further play.
- Ben Curran and Newman Nyamhuri (Zim) both made their ODI debuts.

=== 2nd ODI ===
19 December 2024
09:30
Scorecard

Afghanistan; 286/6 (50 overs)	v	Zimbabwe; 54 (17.5 overs)
Sediqullah Atal 104 (128); Newman Nyamhuri 3/53 (10 overs)		Sikandar Raza 19* (32); Allah Mohammad Ghazanfar 3/9 (3.5 overs)

Afghanistan won by 232 runs
Harare Sports Club, Harare
Umpires: Chris Brown (NZ) and Percival Sizara (Zim)
Player of the match: Sediqullah Atal (Afg)

- Zimbabwe won the toss and elected to field.
- Tinotenda Maposa (Zim) made his ODI debut.
- Sediqullah Atal (Afg) scored his first century in ODIs.
- This was Afghanistan's biggest margin of victory (in terms of runs) in ODIs.

=== 3rd ODI ===
21 December 2024
09:30
Scorecard

Zimbabwe; 127 (30.1 overs)	v	Afghanistan; 131/2 (26.5 overs)
Sean Williams 60 (61); Allah Mohammad Ghazanfar 5/33 (10 overs)		Sediqullah Atal 52 (50); Trevor Gwandu 1/27 (7 overs)

Afghanistan won by 8 wickets
Harare Sports Club, Harare
Umpires: Chris Brown (NZ) and Forster Mutizwa (Zim)
Player of the match: Allah Mohammad Ghazanfar (Afg)

- Afghanistan won the toss and elected to field.
- Bilal Sami (Afg) made his ODI debut.

== Test series ==
=== 1st Test ===
26–30 December 2024
Scorecard

Zimbabwe	v	Afghanistan
586 (135.2 overs); Sean Williams 154 (174); Allah Mohammad Ghazanfar 3/127 (30.2 overs)		699 (197 overs); Hashmatullah Shahidi 246 (474); Brian Bennett 5/95 (28 overs)
142/4 (34 overs); Ben Curran 41 (61); Zahir Khan 2/43 (10 overs)

Match drawn
Queens Sports Club, Bulawayo
Umpires: Allahudien Paleker (SA) and Ahsan Raza (Pak)
Player of the match: Hashmatullah Shahidi (Afg)

- Zimbabwe won the toss and elected to bat.
- Only 31 overs of play was possible on Day 4 due to rain.
- Ben Curran, Trevor Gwandu, Newman Nyamhuri (Zim), Sediqullah Atal, Allah Mohammad Ghazanfar and Azmatullah Omarzai (Afg) all made their Test debuts.
- Brian Bennett (Zim) and Afsar Zazai (Afg) both scored their first centuries in Tests.
- Zimbabwe's first innings total was their highest score in Tests.
- Rahmat Shah (Afg) scored his first double century in Tests and the highest Test score by an Afghan batter. Hashmatullah Shahidi later broke the record for the highest score.
- Afghanistan's first innings total was their highest score in Tests.
- Brian Bennett (Zim) took his first five-wicket haul in Tests.

=== 2nd Test ===
2–6 January 2025
Scorecard

Afghanistan	v	Zimbabwe
157 (44.3 overs); Rashid Khan 25 (20); Sikandar Raza 3/30 (12 overs)		243 (73.3 overs); Craig Ervine 75 (165); Rashid Khan 4/94 (27.3 overs)
363 (113.5 overs); Rahmat Shah 139 (275); Blessing Muzarabani 6/95 (29 overs)		205 (68.3 overs); Craig Ervine 53 (97); Rashid Khan 7/66 (26.3 overs)

Afghanistan won by 72 runs
Queens Sports Club, Bulawayo
Umpires: Allahudien Paleker (SA) and Ahsan Raza (Pak)
Player of the match: Rashid Khan (Afg)

- Zimbabwe won the toss and elected to field.
- No play was possible before Lunch on Day 1 due to rain.
- Fareed Ahmad, Ismat Alam and Riaz Hassan (Afg) all made their Test debuts.
- Blessing Muzarabani (Zim) took his first five-wicket haul in Tests.
- Ismat Alam (Afg) scored his first century in Tests.
