= Afghan cricket team in Ireland in 2026 =

International cricket tour

	Ireland	Afghanistan
- Dates: 5 – 15 August 2026
Captains	Paul Stirling	Rahmat Shah

One Day International series
- Results: Afghanistan won the 5-match series 4–0
Most runs	Curtis Campher (207)	Sediqullah Atal (313)
Most wickets	Gavin Hoey (7)	Rashid Khan (12)
- Player of the series: Rashid Khan (Afg)

The Afghanistan cricket team toured Ireland in August 2026 to play the Ireland cricket team. The tour consisted of five One-day International (ODI) matches. In March 2026, Cricket Ireland (CI) had confirmed the fixtures for the tour as part of the 2026 Home international season.

The hosting of the series attracted significant international media attention, human rights scrutiny, and criticism from rival cricket boards, most notably the England and Wales Cricket Board (ECB), due to moral concerns and political opposition over the Taliban administration's ban on women's sport in Afghanistan.

== Squads ==
Ireland	Afghanistan
Paul Stirling (c); Mark Adair; Andrew Balbirnie; Ben Calitz; Curtis Campher; Cade Carmichael; George Dockrell; Gavin Hoey; Andrew McBrine; Liam McCarthy; Byron McDonough; Jai Moondra; Harry Tector; Lorcan Tucker (wk)	Rahmat Shah (c); Rahmanullah Gurbaz (vc, wk); Ibrahim Zadran; Sediqullah Atal; Hashmatullah Shahidi; Darwish Rasooli; Azmatullah Omarzai; Ikram Alikhil (wk); Nangialai Kharoti; Rashid Khan; AM Ghazanfar; Yamin Ahmadzai; Mohammad Saleem; Fazalhaq Farooqi; Zia Ur Rahman Sharifi

== ODI series ==
=== 1st ODI ===
5 August 2026
10:45
Scorecard

Ireland	v	Afghanistan

Match abandoned
Bready Cricket Club Ground, Magheramason
Umpires: Roly Black (Ire) and Adrian Holdstock (SA)

- No toss.
- No play was possible due to rain.

=== 2nd ODI ===
7 August 2026
10:45
Scorecard

Afghanistan; 299/8 (47 overs)	v	Ireland; 207 (33.4 overs)
Ibrahim Zadran 84 (97); Mark Adair 2/40 (10 overs)		Cade Carmichael 62 (66); Rashid Khan 6/34 (7.4 overs)

Afghanistan won by 92 runs
Bready Cricket Club Ground, Magheramason
Umpires: Roland Black (Ire) and Gareth Morrison (Ire)
Player of the match: Rashid Khan (Afg)

- Ireland won the toss and elected to field.
- The match was reduced to 47 overs per side due to rain.
- Ben Calitz, Byron McDonough and Jai Moondra (Ire) all made their ODI debuts.

=== 3rd ODI ===
10 August 2026
10:45
Scorecard

Ireland; 206 (46.3 overs)	v	Afghanistan; 207/7 (44.5 overs)
Gavin Hoey 36 (67); Allah Ghazanfar 3/29 (9 overs)		Rahmanullah Gurbaz 71 (77); Gavin Hoey 4/34 (10 overs)

Afghanistan won by 3 wickets
Stormont Cricket Ground, Belfast
Umpires: Adrian Holdstock (SA) and Jonathan Kennedy (Ire)
Player of the match: Rashid Khan (Afg)

- Afghanistan won the toss and elected to field.
- Harry Tector (Ire) scored his 2,000th run in ODIs.

=== 4th ODI ===
12 August 2026
10:45
Scorecard

Afghanistan; 343/9 (50 overs)	v	Ireland; 301 (48 overs)
Sediqullah Atal 143 (120); Byron McDonough 3/84 (10 overs)		Andrew Balbirnie 109 (119); Yamin Ahmadzai 4/71 (10 overs)

Afghanistan won by 42 runs
Stormont Cricket Ground, Belfast
Umpires: Roly Black (Ire) and Adrian Holdstock (SA)
Player of the match: Sediqullah Atal (Afg)

- Ireland won the toss and elected to field.
- Ibrahim Zadran (Afg) scored his 2,000th run in ODIs.

=== 5th ODI ===
15 August 2026
10:45
Scorecard

Ireland; 298/7 (50 overs)	v	Afghanistan; 302/4 (48.5 overs)
Curtis Campher 96 (84); Azmatullah Omarzai 3/74 (10 overs)		Rahmat Shah 143* (133); Liam McCarthy 3/47 (10 overs)

Afghanistan won by 6 wickets
Stormont Cricket Ground, Belfast
Umpires: Adrian Holdstock (SA) and Gareth Morrison (Ire)
Player of the match: Rahmat Shah (Afg)

- Afghanistan won the toss and elected to field.
- Hashmatullah Shahidi (Afg) played in his 100th ODI.
- The 201-run partnership between Rahmat Shah and Sediqullah Atal was Afghanistan's highest for the 3rd wicket in ODIs.

== Controversies and protests ==
The series was met with widespread debate, public controversy, and opposition from human rights organisations, fans, and external cricket boards due to Afghanistan's political situation and the exclusion of women from sport under Taliban rule.

When agreeing to the fixtures in March 2026, Cricket Ireland CEO Sarah Keane acknowledged a sense of "moral discomfort" regarding playing Afghanistan. Keane was later appointed to the ICC's Afghanistan Task Force to address these ongoing human rights and participation concerns.

Reports ahead of the series indicated that the England and Wales Cricket Board (ECB) was deeply unhappy with Cricket Ireland's decision to stage the bilateral series. While England continues to play Afghanistan in mandatory ICC events, the ECB maintains a strict policy, aligned with the UK government stance, against scheduling unsanctioned bilateral matches.

Human rights advocates, including Amnesty International, warned Cricket Ireland about providing international legitimacy to the Taliban regime through bilateral fixtures. Opposition was also raised by supporters, including Cricket Ireland fan Orla Phillips from Dalkey, County Dublin, who wrote a letter to the editor of The Irish Times titled "Irony of playing Afghanistan in cricket". In the letter, Phillips criticised the decision to schedule bilateral matches despite the Taliban's ban on women's sport, highlighting the irony of Cricket Ireland hosting the series while receiving state funding, including €70,000 intended to promote gender equality. In response to expected public opposition, Cricket Ireland confirmed that appropriate security measures were put in place at match venues to handle potential demonstrations.
