= Afghan cricket team in Bangladesh in 2019–20 =

International cricket tour

| | Bangladesh | Afghanistan |
- Dates: 1 – 9 September 2019
| Captains | Shakib Al Hasan | Rashid Khan |

Test series
- Result: Afghanistan won the 1-match series 1–0
| Most runs | Mosaddek Hossain (60) | Asghar Afghan (142) |
| Most wickets | Taijul Islam (6) | Rashid Khan (11) |

The Afghanistan cricket team toured Bangladesh to play the Bangladesh cricket team in September 2019 in a one-off Test match. The Bangladesh Cricket Board (BCB) confirmed the schedule for the tour in August 2019.

Following the 2019 Cricket World Cup, where Afghanistan lost all of their matches, Rashid Khan was named as the new captain of the Afghanistan cricket team across all three formats. Khan was 20 years and 350 days old when he led the side in the one-off Test, becoming the youngest cricketer to captain a team in a Test match. On the first day of the match, Rahmat Shah became the first batsman to score a century for Afghanistan in a Test. During the one-off Test match, Afghanistan's Mohammad Nabi announced his retirement from Test cricket, to allow him to focus on white-ball cricket.

Afghanistan won the one-off Test match by 224 runs. It was Afghanistan's second win in Test cricket, their first overseas, and Rashid Khan became the youngest captain to win a Test match. Bangladesh started the fifth and final day of the match on 136/6, with Afghanistan needing just four wickets to win. Play did not start until after 4pm local time, with Afghanistan taking the wickets they needed to win the Test match in the 18.3 overs that were scheduled to be bowled. Rashid Khan was named the player of the match, which he dedicated the award to the retiring Mohammad Nabi.

== Squads ==
Test
| Bangladesh | Afghanistan |
|---|---|
| Shakib Al Hasan (c); Mahmudullah (vc); Taskin Ahmed; Litton Das (wk); Mominul Haque; Mehedi Hasan; Nayeem Hasan; Ebadot Hossain; Mosaddek Hossain; Shadman Islam; Taijul Islam; Abu Jayed; Mohammad Mithun; Mushfiqur Rahim (wk); Soumya Sarkar | Rashid Khan (c); Asghar Afghan (vc); Qais Ahmad; Javed Ahmadi; Yamin Ahmadzai; Ikram Alikhil (wk); Ihsanullah; Zahir Khan; Mohammad Nabi; Rahmat Shah; Hashmatullah Shahidi; Sayed Shirzad; Ibrahim Zadran; Shapoor Zadran; Afsar Zazai (wk) |

== Tour match ==
1–2 September 2019
Scorecard

| Afghanistan | v | Bangladesh Cricket Board XI |
| 289/9d (99 overs); Ihsanullah 62 (137); Al-Amin 4/51 (18 overs) | | 123 (44.3 overs); Al-Amin 29 (49); Zahir Khan 5/24 (11.3 overs) |
| 14/0 (3.5 overs); Javed Ahmadi 12* (18) |

Match drawn
M. A. Aziz Stadium, Chittagong
Umpires: Shafiuddin Ahmed (Ban) and Masudur Rahman (Ban)

- Afghanistan won the toss and elected to bat.

== Only Test ==
5–9 September 2019
Scorecard

| Afghanistan | v | Bangladesh |
| 342 (117 overs); Rahmat Shah 102 (187); Taijul Islam 4/116 (41 overs) | | 205 (70.5 overs); Mominul Haque 52 (71); Rashid Khan 5/55 (19.5 overs) |
| 260 (90.1 overs); Ibrahim Zadran 87 (208); Shakib Al Hasan 3/58 (19 overs) | | 173 (61.4 overs); Shakib Al Hasan 44 (54); Rashid Khan 6/49 (21.4 overs) |

Afghanistan won by 224 runs
Zohur Ahmed Chowdhury Stadium, Chittagong
Umpires: Nigel Llong (Eng) and Paul Wilson (Aus)
Player of the match: Rashid Khan (Afg)

- Afghanistan won the toss and elected to bat.
- Only 2 overs were bowled before tea on day 5 due to rain.
- Qais Ahmad, Zahir Khan and Ibrahim Zadran (Afg) all made their Test debuts.
- Rashid Khan (Afg), at the age of 20 years and 350 days, became the youngest cricketer to captain a side in Tests.
- Paul Wilson (Aus) stood in his first Test match as an umpire.
- Rahmat Shah became the first batsman for Afghanistan to score a century in Tests.
- Taijul Islam became fastest bowler for Bangladesh to take 100 wickets in Tests (44 innings).
- Rashid Khan became the first bowler for Afghanistan to take a ten-wicket haul in Tests, and was the first cricketer to score a fifty and take a ten-wicket haul in his debut match as captain in Tests.
- Bangladesh became the first side to lose a Test against ten different teams.
