= List of Afghanistan Test wicket-keepers =

A Test match is an international cricket match between two representative teams that are full members of the ICC. Both teams have two innings, and the match lasts up to five days. Wicket-keepers plays an important role in test cricket and, over time, the role has evolved into a specialist position.

Afghanistan were granted full membership and therefore Test status at the International Cricket Council's annual conference held on 22 June 2017, after a monumental rise through the associate ranks. Afghanistan played their first Test match in June 2018 against India at the M. Chinnaswamy Stadium in Bengaluru. This is a chronological list of Afghan wicket-keepers, that is, Test cricketers who have kept wicket in a match for Afghanistan.

This list only includes players who have played as the designated keeper for a match. On occasions, another player may have stepped in to relieve the primary wicket-keeper due to injury or the keeper bowling. Figures do not include catches made when the player was a non wicket-keeper.

No.	Player	Span	Tests	Catches	Stumpings	Total dismissals	Ref
1	Afsar Zazai	2018–present	5	9	1	10	
2	Ikram Alikhil	2019	1	4	1	5	

== See also ==
- List of Afghan Test cricketers
