= Irish cricket team against Afghanistan in India in 2018–19 =

International cricket tour

	Afghanistan	Ireland
- Dates: 21 February – 19 March 2019
Captains	Asghar Afghan	William Porterfield (Test & ODIs); Paul Stirling (T20Is)

Test series
- Result: Afghanistan won the 1-match series 1–0
Most runs	Rahmat Shah (174)	Andrew Balbirnie (86)
Most wickets	Rashid Khan (7)	Stuart Thompson (3); Andy McBrine (3); James Cameron-Dow (3)

One Day International series
- Results: 5-match series drawn 2–2
Most runs	Asghar Afghan (226)	Andrew Balbirnie (215)
Most wickets	Mujeeb Ur Rahman (7)	George Dockrell (8)
- Player of the series: Andrew Balbirnie (Ire)

Twenty20 International series
- Results: Afghanistan won the 3-match series 3–0
Most runs	Hazratullah Zazai (204)	Paul Stirling (124)
Most wickets	Rashid Khan (11)	Boyd Rankin (6)
- Player of the series: Mohammad Nabi (Afg)

The Ireland cricket team toured India in February and March 2019 to play three Twenty20 Internationals (T20Is), five One Day Internationals (ODIs) and a Test match against the Afghanistan cricket team. It was Ireland's first Test played overseas and the first Test match between the two sides. All of the fixtures took place at the Rajiv Gandhi International Cricket Stadium in Dehradun. The ODI fixtures were part of Afghanistan's preparation for the 2019 Cricket World Cup. In January 2019, the fixtures were brought forward by two days, to avoid clashing with the Indian Premier League.

In the second T20I match, the Afghanistan team set several records. They made the highest team total, with 278 for 3, which included the highest partnership for any wicket, with Hazratullah Zazai and Usman Ghani putting on 236 runs for the first wicket. Hazratullah Zazai scored 162 not out, the highest score for an Afghan batsman in a T20I fixture. Afghanistan went on to win the T20I series 3–0. The ODI series was drawn 2–2, after the second match finished as a no result.

Afghanistan won the one-off Test match by seven wickets to record their first victory in a Test match. They became the joint-second quickest, after England and Pakistan, to record their maiden win in Test cricket. Asghar Afghan, captain of the Afghanistan team said that "it is a historic day for Afghanistan, for Afghanistan people, for our team, for our cricket board". Ireland's captain, William Porterfield, said he was pleased how the five debutants performed and that Afghanistan were deserved winners. Afghanistan's all-rounder Mohammad Nabi, praised both the batting and the bowling from the team saying "it shows we are ready for Test cricket". Player of the match, Rahmat Shah, moved up to 89th place in the ICC Test Player Rankings, the highest-placed batsman for Afghanistan.

== Squads ==
Test		ODIs		T20Is	
Afghanistan	Ireland	Afghanistan	Ireland	Afghanistan	Ireland
Asghar Afghan (c); Javed Ahmadi; Yamin Ahmadzai; Sharafuddin Ashraf; Nasir Jamal; Ihsan Janat; Rashid Khan; Zahir Khan; Ikram Alikhil; Wafadar Momand; Mohammad Nabi; Waqar Salamkheil; Rahmat Shah; Hashmatullah Shahidi; Mohammad Shahzad; Sayed Shirzad	William Porterfield (c); Andrew Balbirnie; James Cameron-Dow; George Dockrell; Andy McBrine; Barry McCarthy; James McCollum; Tim Murtagh; Kevin O'Brien; Stuart Poynter; Boyd Rankin; Simi Singh; Paul Stirling; Stuart Thompson; Lorcan Tucker	Asghar Afghan (c); Javed Ahmadi; Aftab Alam; Karim Janat; Rashid Khan; Zahir Khan; Ikram Alikhil; Fareed Malik; Mohammad Nabi; Gulbadin Naib; Mujeeb Ur Rahman; Rahmat Shah; Hashmatullah Shahidi; Mohammad Shahzad; Samiullah Shinwari; Sayed Shirzad; Dawlat Zadran; Najibullah Zadran; Noor Ali Zadran; Shapoor Zadran; Hazratullah Zazai	William Porterfield (c); Andrew Balbirnie; James Cameron-Dow; Peter Chase; George Dockrell; Andy McBrine; Barry McCarthy; James McCollum; Tim Murtagh; Kevin O'Brien; Stuart Poynter; Boyd Rankin; Simi Singh; Paul Stirling; Stuart Thompson; Lorcan Tucker	Asghar Afghan (c); Sharafuddin Ashraf; Usman Ghani; Karim Janat; Rashid Khan; Zahir Khan; Fareed Malik; Mohammad Nabi; Mujeeb Ur Rahman; Ziaur Rahman; Shafiqullah Shafaq; Samiullah Shinwari; Sayed Shirzad; Najeeb Tarakai; Najibullah Zadran; Hazratullah Zazai	Paul Stirling (c); Andrew Balbirnie; Peter Chase; George Dockrell; Shane Getkate; Josh Little; Andy McBrine; Kevin O'Brien; Stuart Poynter; Boyd Rankin; James Shannon; Simi Singh; Harry Tector; Stuart Thompson; Lorcan Tucker

Ahead of the ODI series, Stuart Thompson was added to Ireland's squad. Following the conclusion of the ODI series, Zahir Khan and Sayed Shirzad were both added to Afghanistan's Test squad.

== T20I series ==
=== 1st T20I ===
21 February 2019
18:30 (N)
Scorecard

Ireland; 132/6 (20 overs)	v	Afghanistan; 136/5 (19.2 overs)
George Dockrell 34* (28); Mohammad Nabi 2/16 (4 overs)		Mohammad Nabi 49* (40); Boyd Rankin 2/39 (4 overs)

Afghanistan won by 5 wickets
Rajiv Gandhi International Cricket Stadium, Dehradun
Umpires: Ahmed Shah Pakteen (Afg) and Izatullah Safi (Afg)
Player of the match: Mohammad Nabi (Afg)

- Ireland won the toss and elected to bat.
- George Dockrell and Stuart Poynter made Ireland's highest seventh-wicket partnership in T20Is (67).
- Mohammad Nabi and Najibullah Zadran made Afghanistan's highest sixth-wicket partnership in T20Is (86).

=== 2nd T20I ===
23 February 2019
18:30 (N)
Scorecard

Afghanistan; 278/3 (20 overs)	v	Ireland; 194/6 (20 overs)
Hazratullah Zazai 162* (62); Boyd Rankin 1/35 (4 overs)		Paul Stirling 91 (50); Rashid Khan 4/25 (4 overs)

Afghanistan won by 84 runs
Rajiv Gandhi International Cricket Stadium, Dehradun
Umpires: Ahmed Shah Durrani (Afg) and Bismillah Jan Shinwari (Afg)
Player of the match: Hazratullah Zazai (Afg)

- Afghanistan won the toss and elected to bat.
- Hazratullah Zazai and Usman Ghani (Afg) made the highest partnership for any wicket in T20Is (236).
- Hazratullah Zazai scored his first T20I century and made the highest score for an Afghan batsman in T20Is, and second highest individual score overall.
- Hazratullah Zazai also hit the most sixes in an innings in T20Is (16), with Afghanistan hitting the most sixes in an innings by a team in T20Is (22).
- Afghanistan's total of 278 runs was the highest by any team in a T20I.
- Paul Stirling made the highest individual total for Ireland in T20Is.

=== 3rd T20I ===
24 February 2019
18:30 (N)
Scorecard

Afghanistan; 210/7 (20 overs)	v	Ireland; 178/8 (20 overs)
Mohammad Nabi 81 (36); Boyd Rankin 3/53 (4 overs)		Kevin O'Brien 74 (47); Rashid Khan 5/27 (4 overs)

Afghanistan won by 32 runs
Rajiv Gandhi International Cricket Stadium, Dehradun
Umpires: Ahmed Shah Durrani (Afg) and Izatullah Safi (Afg)
Player of the match: Mohammad Nabi (Afg)

- Ireland won the toss and elected to field.
- Ziaur Rahman (Afg) made his T20I debut.
- Kevin O'Brien (Ire) scored his 1,000th run in T20Is.
- Rashid Khan (Afg) took a hat-trick and four wickets with four balls.

== ODI series ==
=== 1st ODI ===
28 February 2019
13:00 (D/N)
Scorecard

Ireland; 161 (49.2 overs)	v	Afghanistan; 165/5 (41.5 overs)
Paul Stirling 89 (150); Mujeeb Ur Rahman 3/14 (10 overs)		Gulbadin Naib 46 (61); Boyd Rankin 2/48 (9 overs)

Afghanistan won by 5 wickets
Rajiv Gandhi International Cricket Stadium, Dehradun
Umpires: Ahmed Shah Pakteen (Afg) and Sundaram Ravi (Ind)
Player of the match: Gulbadin Naib (Afg)

- Ireland won the toss and elected to bat.
- This was the first ODI to be played at this venue.
- James McCollum (Ire) made his ODI debut.

=== 2nd ODI ===
2 March 2019
13:00 (D/N)
Scorecard

Afghanistan; 250/7 (48.3 overs)	v	Ireland
Hazratullah Zazai 67 (43); George Dockrell 3/51 (9 overs)

No result
Rajiv Gandhi International Cricket Stadium, Dehradun
Umpires: Sundaram Ravi (Ind) and Bismillah Jan Shinwari (Afg)

- Afghanistan won the toss and elected to bat.
- Rain during Afghanistan's innings prevented any further play.
- Ikram Alikhil, Sayed Shirzad (Afg) and James Cameron-Dow (Ire) all made their ODI debuts.

=== 3rd ODI ===
5 March 2019
13:00 (D/N)
Scorecard

Afghanistan; 256/8 (50 overs)	v	Ireland; 260/6 (49 overs)
Najibullah Zadran 104* (98); Boyd Rankin 2/56 (10 overs)		Andrew Balbirnie 145* (136); Dawlat Zadran 2/52 (10 overs)

Ireland won by 4 wickets
Rajiv Gandhi International Cricket Stadium, Dehradun
Umpires: Sundaram Ravi (Ind) and Izatullah Safi (Afg)
Player of the match: Andrew Balbirnie (Ire)

- Afghanistan won the toss and elected to bat.
- Najibullah Zadran (Afg) scored his first century in ODIs.
- Andrew Balbirnie scored the most sixes in an ODI innings for Ireland (8).

=== 4th ODI ===
8 March 2019
13:00 (D/N)
Scorecard

Afghanistan; 223 (49.1 overs)	v	Ireland; 114 (35.3 overs)
Mohammad Nabi 64 (85); James Cameron-Dow 3/32 (10 overs)		Kevin O'Brien 26 (57); Aftab Alam 4/25 (8 overs)

Afghanistan won by 109 runs
Rajiv Gandhi International Cricket Stadium, Dehradun
Umpires: Ahmed Shah Pakteen (Afg) and Sundaram Ravi (Ind)
Player of the match: Rashid Khan (Afg)

- Ireland won the toss and elected to field.

=== 5th ODI ===
10 March 2019
13:00 (D/N)
Scorecard

Afghanistan; 216/6 (50 overs)	v	Ireland; 219/5 (47.2 overs)
Asghar Afghan 82* (111); George Dockrell 2/46 (10 overs)		Paul Stirling 70 (88); Zahir Khan 2/55 (10 overs)

Ireland won by 5 wickets
Rajiv Gandhi International Cricket Stadium, Dehradun
Umpires: Sundaram Ravi (Ind) and Bismillah Jan Shinwari (Afg)
Player of the match: Asghar Afghan (Afg)

- Ireland won the toss and elected to field.
- Zahir Khan (Afg) made his ODI debut.

== Only Test ==
15–19 March 2019 (Note: While five days of play were scheduled for the one-off Test, the match reached a result in four days.)
Scorecard

Ireland	v	Afghanistan
172 (60 overs); Tim Murtagh 54* (75); Mohammad Nabi 3/36 (14 overs)		314 (106.3 overs); Rahmat Shah 98 (214); Stuart Thompson 3/28 (17.3 overs)
288 (93 overs); Andrew Balbirnie 82 (149); Rashid Khan 5/82 (34 overs)		149/3 (47.5 overs); Rahmat Shah 76 (122); James Cameron-Dow 1/24 (5.5 overs)

Afghanistan won by 7 wickets
Rajiv Gandhi International Cricket Stadium, Dehradun
Umpires: Richard Illingworth (Eng) and Sundaram Ravi (Ind)
Player of the match: Rahmat Shah (Afg)

- Ireland won the toss and elected to bat.
- This was the first Test to be played at this venue.
- Ihsanullah, Ikram Alikhil, Waqar Salamkheil (Afg), James Cameron-Dow, George Dockrell, Andy McBrine, James McCollum and Stuart Poynter (Ire) all made their Test debuts.
- Rashid Khan became the first bowler for Afghanistan to take a five-wicket haul in Tests.
- This was Afghanistan's first win in Tests.
