= Trevor Gwandu =

Zimbabwean cricketer (born 1998)

Personal information
- Full name: Trevor Wesley Gwandu
- Born: 24 February 1998 (age 28); Harare, Zimbabwe
- Batting: Right-handed
- Bowling: Right-arm Medium
- Role: Bowler

International information
- National side: Zimbabwe (2023–present)
- Test debut (cap 131): 26 December 2024 v Afghanistan
- Last Test: 7 August 2025 v New Zealand
- ODI debut (cap 158): 24 November 2024 v Pakistan
- Last ODI: 18 February 2025 v Ireland
- ODI shirt no.: 51
- T20I debut (cap 76): 7 December 2023 v Ireland
- Last T20I: 25 February 2025 v Ireland
- T20I shirt no.: 51

Career statistics
Competition	Test	ODI	T20I	FC
Matches	2	7	14	24
Runs scored	23	7	14	414
Batting average	11.50	3.50	14.00	13.35
100s/50s	0/0	0/0	0/0	0/0
Top score	18*	3*	7*	39
Balls bowled	300	240	199	2069
Wickets	4	7	14	26
Bowling average	55.75	32.71	18.35	47.96
5 wickets in innings	0	0	0	0
10 wickets in match	0	0	0	0
Best bowling	2/28	2/44	3/10	2/28
Catches/stumpings	1/–	0/–	2/–	10/–
- Source: Cricinfo, 7 August 2025

Trevor Gwandu (born 24 February 1998) is a Zimbabwean cricketer. He made his first-class debut for Mid West Rhinos in the 2017–18 Logan Cup on 10 October 2017. He made his List A debut for Mid West Rhinos in the 2017–18 Pro50 Championship on 1 December 2017. In December 2020, he was selected to play for the Rhinos in the 2020–21 Logan Cup.

Gwandu got his first international call up during the Irish tour of Zimbabwe in 2023–24 and made his T20I debut on 7 December 2023. He made his Test debut after being selected for a two-match home series against Afghanistan in December 2024.
