= Takudzwa Chataira =

Zimbabwean cricketer (born 1997)

Personal information
- Full name: Takudzwa Zivanai Chataira
- Born: 25 December 1997 (age 28); Harare, Zimbabwe
- Batting: Right-handed
- Bowling: Right arm medium

Domestic team information
- Years: Team
- 2022–present: Southern Rocks
- Source: Cricinfo, 22 January 2025

Takudzwa Zivanai Chataira (born 25 December 1997) is a Zimbabwean cricketer, who plays for Southern Rocks in domestic cricket. He made his first-class debut against Mashonaland Eagles on 24 November 2024 during the 2022–23 Logan Cup. He made his List A debut against Mid West Rhinos on 1 October 2022 during the 2022–23 Pro50 Championship.

In March 2024, he was named in Zimbabwe's Emerging squad for the 2023 African Games. He was retained by Southern Rocks ahead of the 2023–24 Logan Cup and 2024–25 Logan Cup. In December 2024, he was named in Zimbabwe's Test squad for the series against Afghanistan. Ahead of the first Test he was ruled out of the series due to suffered from right-side strain during practice and Victor Nyauchi replaced him.
