= Javed Ahmadi =

Afghan cricketer

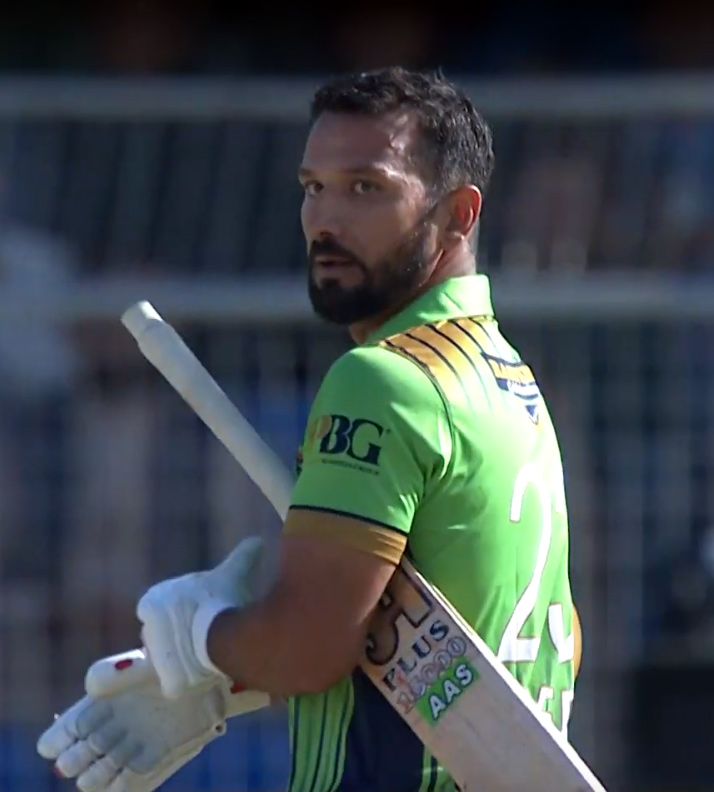
- Javed Ahmadi in 2020

Personal information
- Full name: Javed Ahmadi
- Born: 2 January 1992 (age 34); Kunduz, Afghanistan
- Batting: Right-handed
- Bowling: Right-arm off break
- Role: Top-order batter

International information
- National side: Afghanistan (2018–2021)
- Test debut (cap 4): 14 June 2018 v India
- Last Test: 10 March 2021 v Zimbabwe
- ODI debut (cap 19): 9 July 2010 v Scotland
- Last ODI: 26 January 2021 v Ireland
- ODI shirt no.: 23
- T20I debut (cap 17): 14 March 2012 v Netherlands
- Last T20I: 5 June 2017 v West Indies
- T20I shirt no.: 23

Domestic team information
- Years: Team
- 2017: Amo Region

Career statistics
Competition	Test	ODI	T20I	FC
Matches	3	47	3	17
Runs scored	113	1,049	6	941
Batting average	18.83	23.84	3.00	32.44
100s/50s	0/1	0/7	0/0	3/5
Top score	62	81	6	197
Balls bowled	150	452	–	820
Wickets	1	9	–	10
Bowling average	69.00	40.33	–	35.90
5 wickets in innings	0	0	–	0
10 wickets in match	0	0	–	0
Best bowling	1/40	4/37	–	3/39
Catches/stumpings	1/–	11/–	0/–	9/–
- Source: Cricinfo, 22 September 2022

Javed Ahmadi (born 2 January 1992) is an Afghan cricketer. He is a right-handed batsman who bowls right-arm off break. He currently represents the Afghanistan national cricket team. He was one of the eleven cricketers to play in Afghanistan's first Test match, against India, in June 2018.

== Career ==
Ahmadi first represented Afghanistan in age-group cricket, and was a member of the Afghanistan Under-19 cricket team which, for the first time, qualified for the 2010 ICC Under-19 Cricket World Cup in New Zealand. Ahmadi represented Afghanistan during the World Cup.

Ahmadi's senior debut came against Scotland in a warm-up match for the 2010 ICC World Cricket League Division One. During this tournament he made his debut in List-A cricket and also his debut in One Day International cricket against Scotland. He played one further ODI during the tournament, which came against hosts the Netherlands. To date, he has played two further ODI's, both of which came against Scotland during Afghanistan's tour of Scotland in 2010. In his four ODIs to date, Ahmadi has scored 31 runs at a batting average of 10.33, with a high score of 25. Meanwhile, in the field he has taken 2 catches.

Ahmadi's first-class debut came against Kenya in the 2009-10 ICC Intercontinental Cup. During the match he made scores of 11 and 55, his maiden first-class half century.

In July 2018, he was the leading run-scorer for Amo Region in the 2018 Ghazi Amanullah Khan Regional One Day Tournament, with 267 runs in five matches.

In September 2018, he was named in Kabul's squad in the first edition of the Afghanistan Premier League tournament.

=== Test cricket ===
In May 2018, he was named in Afghanistan's squad for their inaugural Test match, played against India. He made his Test debut against India, on 14 June 2018. In February 2019, he was named in Afghanistan's Test squad for their one-off match against Ireland in India.
