= Afghan cricket team in India in 2018 =

International cricket tour

	India	Afghanistan
- Dates: 14 – 18 June 2018 (Note: While five days of play were scheduled for the Test, the match reached a result in two days.)
Captains	Ajinkya Rahane	Asghar Stanikzai

Test series
- Result: India won the 1-match series 1–0
Most runs	Shikhar Dhawan (107)	Hashmatullah Shahidi (47)
Most wickets	Ravindra Jadeja (6)	Yamin Ahmadzai (3)

The Afghanistan cricket team toured India in June 2018 to play a one-off Test match against the India cricket team. It was Afghanistan's first Test since they were awarded the Test status by the International Cricket Council (ICC) in June 2017. India won the match in two days by an innings and 262 runs. Afghanistan were dismissed twice in the same day, only the fourth time this has happened in Tests. For India, it was their biggest win by an innings in Tests, and they became the first Asian team to win a Test match inside two days.

After the match, India's captain Ajinkya Rahane said that playing more Tests and first-class cricket would improve the Afghan side. Phil Simmons, Afghanistan's coach, said that the team were "'by no means happy' with their performance", but believed they would get there with further hard work.

== Background ==
In late 2017, it was announced that Zimbabwe would be Afghanistan's first Test opponents, but the tour was confirmed as being limited overs matches only. In December 2017, the Board of Control for Cricket in India (BCCI) and the Afghanistan Cricket Board (ACB) confirmed that the match would take place in 2018, with the exact date and venue to be announced at a later date. In January 2018, both the ACB and the BCCI confirmed the Test would be played in June at the M. Chinnaswamy Stadium in Bengaluru. It was the first time a Test match was played in June in India.

== Squads ==
India	Afghanistan
Ajinkya Rahane (c); Ravichandran Ashwin; Shikhar Dhawan; Ravindra Jadeja; Dinesh Karthik (wk); Karun Nair; Hardik Pandya; Cheteshwar Pujara; KL Rahul; Navdeep Saini; ~~Wriddhiman Saha (wk)~~; ~~Mohammed Shami~~; Ishant Sharma; Shardul Thakur; Murali Vijay; Kuldeep Yadav; Umesh Yadav	Asghar Stanikzai (c); Javed Ahmadi; Yamin Ahmadzai; Amir Hamza; Ihsanullah; Nasir Jamal; Rashid Khan; Zahir Khan; Wafadar Momand; Mohammad Nabi; Rahmat Shah; Hashmatullah Shahidi; Mohammad Shahzad (wk); Sayed Shirzad; Mujeeb Ur Rahman; Afsar Zazai

India's captain Virat Kohli announced that he would miss this Test match as he elected to play for Surrey County Cricket Club. This was in preparation for India's tour to England the following month. However, a neck injury ruled him out of playing for Surrey in England. Ajinkya Rahane was named as India's captain for the Test match in Kohli's absence.

Prior to the final squad selection, Afghanistan had a team of thirty players warming up for the match in Greater Noida. On 29 May 2018, the ACB announced a sixteen-man squad for the Test match, with Asghar Stanikzai named as the captain. Afghan bowler Rashid Khan said that "it will be a big day for cricket in Afghanistan" and he could not wait to become a Test cricketer. He later added that the match will be "a test of patience" and that he might end up taking no wickets.

Ahead of the Test, Wriddhiman Saha was ruled out of India's squad due to injury, and was replaced by Dinesh Karthik. Mohammed Shami was also ruled out of India's squad after failing a fitness test, being replaced by Navdeep Saini.

Before the Test, both captains commented on the significance of the fixture. Asghar Stanikzai, Afghanistan's captain, said that "to be playing our first Test against India is a great honour and we hope to give a good account of ourselves". India's captain, Ajinkya Rahane, said "it's a privilege to be playing in Afghanistan's first Test match" adding that it will be an historic moment for the Afghan team.

== Only Test ==
14–18 June 2018
Scorecard

India	v	Afghanistan
474 (104.5 overs); Shikhar Dhawan 107 (96); Yamin Ahmadzai 3/51 (19 overs)		109 (27.5 overs); Mohammad Nabi 24 (44); Ravichandran Ashwin 4/27 (8 overs)
		103 (38.4 overs) (f/o); Hashmatullah Shahidi 36* (88); Ravindra Jadeja 4/17 (9 overs)

India won by an innings and 262 runs
M. Chinnaswamy Stadium, Bengaluru
Umpires: Chris Gaffaney (NZ) and Paul Reiffel (Aus)
Player of the match: Shikhar Dhawan (Ind)

- India won the toss and elected to bat.
- 12 overs of play were lost on day one due to rain.
- This was Afghanistan's first Test match.
- Mohammad Shahzad, Javed Ahmadi, Rahmat Shah, Asghar Afghan, Hashmatullah Shahidi, Mohammad Nabi, Afsar Zazai, Rashid Khan, Yamin Ahmadzai, Wafadar Momand and Mujeeb Ur Rahman (Afg) all made their Test debuts.
- Mujeeb Ur Rahman (Afg) became the sixth player, and first for Afghanistan, to make his first-class debut in a Test match. He became the first player born in the 21st century to play Test cricket and also became the youngest player to feature in their country's inaugural Test match (17 years and 78 days).
- Shikhar Dhawan became the sixth batsman, and the first for India, to score a century before lunch on day one of a Test.
- Rashid Khan (Afg) conceded the most runs in their country's inaugural Test match (154).
- Umesh Yadav (Ind) took his 100th wicket in Tests.
