= Rahmat Shah =

Afghan cricketer (born 1993)

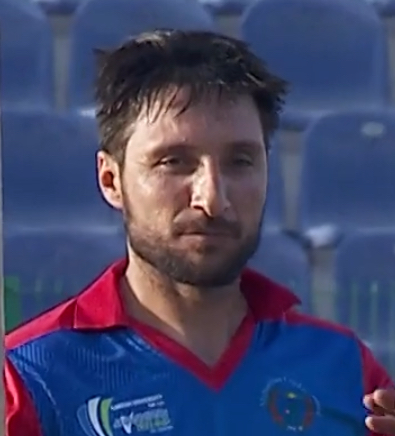
- Shah in 2021

Personal information
- Full name: Rahmat Shah Zurmatai
- Born: 6 July 1993 (age 33); Zurmat, Paktia, Afghanistan
- Batting: Right-handed
- Bowling: Right-arm leg break
- Role: All-rounder

International information
- National side: Afghanistan (2013–present)
- Test debut (cap 8): 14 June 2018 v India
- Last Test: 5 November 2026 v Zimbabwe
- ODI debut (cap 29): 6 March 2013 v Scotland
- Last ODI: 23 October 2026 v Zimbabwe
- ODI shirt no.: 8
- Only T20I (cap 54): 11 January 2024 v India

Domestic team information
- Years: Team
- 2013: Afghan Cheetahs
- 2013/14–2014/15: Mohammedan SC
- 2017: Mis Ainak Region

Career statistics
Competition	Test	ODI	T20I	FC
Matches	14	135	1	43
Runs scored	1,372	4,417	3	3,113
Batting average	54.88	36.20	3.00	47.89
100s/50s	5/7	6/34	0/0	10/15
Top score	234	143*	3	234
Balls bowled	84	543	–	1,016
Wickets	1	15	–	17
Bowling average	53.00	35.46	–	32.23
5 wickets in innings	0	1	–	0
10 wickets in match	0	0	–	0
Best bowling	1/34	5/32	–	3/30
Catches/stumpings	10/–	34/–	0/–	27/–
- Source: ESPNcricinfo, 11 November 2026

Rahmat Shah Zurmatai (Pashto: رحمت شاه زرمتی; born 6 July 1993) is an Afghan cricketer who plays for the Afghanistan national cricket team. He is a right-handed batsman and an occasional leg break bowler. He made his international debut in an ODI against Scotland in March 2013. He was one of the eleven cricketers to play in Afghanistan's first ever Test match, against India, in June 2018. In September 2019, in the one-off Test between Afghanistan and Bangladesh, Rahmat scored Afghanistan's first century in Test cricket.

== Domestic career ==
Rahmat was named in a number of first-class and One-Day International squads for Afghanistan. He has played List A cricket for Afghanistan against Pakistan A and other domestic teams in Pakistan, such as Faisalabad and Rawalpindi. He made his Twenty20 debut for Band-e-Amir Dragons in the 2017 Shpageeza Cricket League on 12 September 2017.

In July 2018, Rahmat was the leading run-scorer for Mis Ainak Region in the 2018 Ghazi Amanullah Khan Regional One Day Tournament, with 258 runs in five matches. He was also the leading wicket-taker for the team in the tournament, with eight dismissals in five matches.

== International career ==
Rahmat made his One Day International (ODI) debut for Afghanistan against Scotland on 6 March 2013. On 4 July 2016, he made his first century in an ODI during Afghanistan's tour of Scotland.

In May 2018, Rahmat was named in Afghanistan's squad for their inaugural Test match, played against India. He made his Test debut for Afghanistan, against India, on 14 June 2018. In February 2019, he was named in Afghanistan's Test squad for their one-off match against Ireland in India.

In April 2019, Rahmat was named in Afghanistan's squad for the 2019 Cricket World Cup. He finished the tournament as the leading run-scorer for Afghanistan, with 254 runs in nine matches.

In April 2019, the Afghanistan Cricket Board (ACB) named Shah as the team's new Test captain, replacing Asghar Afghan. However, following the 2019 Cricket World Cup, Rashid Khan was named as the new captain of the Afghanistan cricket team across all three formats. Therefore, Rahmat was replaced before captaining the team in a Test match.

In September 2019, Rahmat scored a century in the one-off Test match against Bangladesh, becoming the first batsman for Afghanistan to score a century in a Test match.

In January 2024, Shah was named in Afghanistan's Twenty20 International (T20I) squads for their series against India. On 11 January 2024, He made his T20I debut for Afghanistan against India.

In December 2024, he made his maiden Test match double century in the first of a two-match series against Zimbabwe. His 234 was also the highest score by an Afghan batter in a Test match that point, although it was surpassed by teammate Hashmatullah Shahidi who made 246 later in the same match.

On the 7th of June 2026, during the tour to India, Shah became the first batsman from Afghanistan to score 1000 runs in Test cricket, reaching the milestone with an inside edge for four of Manav Suthar's bowling.

On 15 August 2026 during the 5th ODI vs Ireland, Shah hit the highest ODI score of his career, hitting an unbeaten 143* off 133 balls and winning player of the match, as Afghanistan chased a record 299, their highest successful chase in the format.

== T20 franchise career ==
In September 2018, Rahmat was named in Nangarhar's squad in the first edition of the Afghanistan Premier League tournament.
