= Zahir Khan (Afghan cricketer) =

Afghan cricketer

Personal information
- Full name: Zahir Khan Pakteen
- Born: 20 December 1998 (age 27); Kabul, Afghanistan
- Nickname: Paheli
- Batting: Left-handed
- Bowling: Left-arm unorthodox spin
- Role: Bowler

International information
- National side: Afghanistan (2019–present)
- Test debut (cap 17): 5 September 2019 v Bangladesh
- Last Test: 26 December 2024 v Zimbabwe
- Only ODI (cap 47): 10 March 2019 v Ireland
- T20I debut (cap 49): 19 February 2023 v United Arab Emirates
- Last T20I: 7 October 2023 v India

Domestic team information
- Years: Team
- 2017: Band-e-Amir Region
- 2017–present: Mis Ainak Region
- 2017: Rangpur Riders
- 2018: Lancashire
- 2018: Nangarhar Leopards
- 2019: Khulna Titans
- 2019: Jamaica Tallawahs
- 2019: Speenghar Region
- 2019/20: Brisbane Heat
- 2020: St Lucia Zouks
- 2020/21: Melbourne Stars
- 2021: Quetta Gladiators
- 2021/22: Melbourne Renegades

Career statistics
Competition	Test	ODI	T20I	FC
Matches	6	1	4	34
Runs scored	8	–	0	241
Batting average	1.60	–	0.00	7.30
100s/50s	0/0	–/–	0/0	0/0
Top score	4*	–	0	39
Balls bowled	900	60	48	5,570
Wickets	15	2	3	148
Bowling average	46.60	27.50	16.66	26.53
5 wickets in innings	0	0	0	7
10 wickets in match	0	0	0	1
Best bowling	3/59	2/55	2/20	6/52
Catches/stumpings	0/–	0/–	0/–	8/–
Medal record
Representing Afghanistan
Men's Cricket
Asian Games
Silver medal – second place	2022 Hangzhou	Team
- Source: ESPNcricinfo, 19 July 2026

Zahir Khan Pakteen (Pashto: ظاهر خان; born 20 December 1998) is an Afghan cricketer. He made his Test match debut for Afghanistan in September 2019. He made his first-class debut for Afghanistan against Papua New Guinea in the 2015–17 ICC Intercontinental Cup on 21 November 2015. He represented Afghanistan in the 2016 Under-19 Cricket World Cup.

== Domestic career ==
He made his List A debut for Band-e-Amir Region in the 2017 Ghazi Amanullah Khan Regional One Day Tournament on 10 August 2017. Along with Karim Janat, he was the joint-leading wicket-taker in the tournament, with twelve dismissals. He made his Twenty20 debut for Mis Ainak Knights in the 2017 Shpageeza Cricket League on 12 September 2017.

In August 2018, he joined the English side Lancashire for the rest of the season. He was the leading wicket-taker in the 2019 Ahmad Shah Abdali 4-day Tournament, with thirty dismissals in five matches.

== T20 franchise career ==
In September 2018, he was named in Nangarhar's squad in the first edition of the Afghanistan Premier League tournament. In October 2018, he was named in the squad for the Khulna Titans team, following the draft for the 2018–19 Bangladesh Premier League.

In 2018 he signed for the Rajasthan Royals in the Indian Premier League however he was ruled out of the season due to injury. He played for the Jamaica Tallawahs in the Caribbean Premier League in 2019 and he signed for the Brisbane Heat for the Big Bash League for the 2019–20 season and stated "“This is a very exciting thing for me, especially to be joining the team where my good friend Mujeeb played last year. He told me great things about Brisbane Heat, so I am looking forward to this challenge so much.” He did not resign with the Heat for the following season, and head coach Darren Lehmann said the following regarding his time with the club: “On behalf of the club, we really wish Tom and Zahir all the best for what lies ahead with their cricket as they both have enormous potential. . . It was great to see them display their ability and we thoroughly enjoyed having them in the squad. We hope they got plenty out of the experience."

He signed for the Melbourne Stars for the 2020-21 Big Bash season saying “I’m really looking forward to playing for the Stars during this BBL season. The squad is looking strong and I’d like to thank the club for giving me the chance to be part of it. Together I am sure we will build a successful season.”

== International career ==
In December 2017, he was named in Afghanistan's squad for the 2018 Under-19 Cricket World Cup. In January 2018, he was bought by the Rajasthan Royals in the 2018 IPL auction. In December 2018, he was named in Afghanistan's under-23 team for the 2018 ACC Emerging Teams Asia Cup.

In May 2018, he was named in Afghanistan's squad for their inaugural Test match, played against India, but he was not selected for the match.

In February 2019, he was named in Afghanistan's One Day International (ODI) and Twenty20 International (T20I) squads for their series against Ireland in India. He made his ODI debut for Afghanistan against Ireland on 10 March 2019. Following the conclusion of the ODI series, he was added to Afghanistan's Test squad, for the one-off match against Ireland, but he did not play.

In August 2019, he was named in Afghanistan's Test squad for their one-off match against Bangladesh. He made his Test debut for Afghanistan, in the one-off match against Bangladesh, on 5 September 2019.

In May 2022, he was named as a reserve in Afghanistan's Twenty20 International (T20I) squad for their series against Zimbabwe. He made his T20I debut for Afghanistan against UAE on 19 February 2023.
