= Sediqullah Atal =

Afghan cricketer (born 2001)

Personal information
- Born: 12 August 2001 (age 25); Logar, Afghanistan
- Height: 1.88 m (6 ft 2 in)
- Batting: Left-handed
- Role: Opening batter

International information
- National side: Afghanistan
- Test debut (cap 33): 26 December 2024 v Zimbabwe
- Last Test: 9 October 2026 v Bangladesh
- ODI debut (cap 63): 6 November 2024 v Bangladesh
- Last ODI: 21 October 2026 v Bangladesh
- T20I debut (cap 50): 27 March 2023 v Pakistan
- Last T20I: 17 September 2026 v India

Career statistics
Competition	Test	ODI	T20I	FC
Matches	3	20	32	20
Runs scored	190	838	647	1001
Batting average	38.00	44.10	21.56	28.60
100s/50s	1/0	3/3	0/4	1/5
Top score	111	133	73*	111
Catches/stumpings	2/0	7/0	14/0	13/0
Medal record
Representing Afghanistan
Men's Cricket
Asian Games
Silver medal – second place	2022 Hangzhou	Team
- Source: cricinfo, 23 October 2026

Sediqullah Atal (Pashto: صدیق الله اتل) (born 12 August 2001), also known as Sediq Atal, is an Afghan cricketer. He is an opening batter, who made his international debut for Afghanistan in 2023. He got selected in the Afghanistan squad for the Champions Trophy 2025 in Pakistan.

== Career ==
He made his Twenty20 debut on 7 September 2020, for Kabul Eagles in the 2020 Shpageeza Cricket League. Prior to his Twenty20 debut, he was named in Afghanistan's squad for the 2020 Under-19 Cricket World Cup. He made his List A debut on 17 October 2021, for Band-e-Amir Region in the 2021 Ghazi Amanullah Khan Regional One Day Tournament.

In July 2021, Sediqullah was named in Afghanistan's One Day International (ODI) squad for their series against Pakistan, but the series was later postponed following the Taliban takeover of Afghanistan. On 23 January 2023, the series was rescheduled and both cricket boards agreed to play three Twenty20 International (T20Is) matches instead of ODIs. Sediqullah was again named in Afghanistan's squad for that series against Pakistan. He made his T20I debut in the 3rd and final T20I match of the series, on 27 March 2023.

In May 2024, he was named as a reserve player in Afghanistan's squad for the 2024 ICC Men's T20 World Cup tournament.

In October 2024 Sediqullah Atal played for Afghanistan A team in the ACC emerging team Asia cup where he became the player of the tournament by scoring 368 runs in 5 matches. He scored 83,95, 52,83, 55, at an amazing batting average of 122.66 and strike rate of 145. This amazing performance put him at the leading run-scorers on the board and led Afghanistan A to a maiden ACC Asia cup trophy win.

Also he is added in Afghanistan squad for ICC Champions trophy 2025, Pakistan.

On 12 August 2026, During the 4th match of the Ireland ODI series, Atal hit a career best score of 143 off 120 balls, as he and Ibrahim Zadran put on a record breaking 231 run stand, Afghanistan's largest ever for the 2nd wicket.

He played for Delhi Capitals in the 2025 Indian Premier League (IPL), making his IPL debut against Punjab Kings on 24 May 2025.
