= Yamin Ahmadzai =

Afghan cricketer

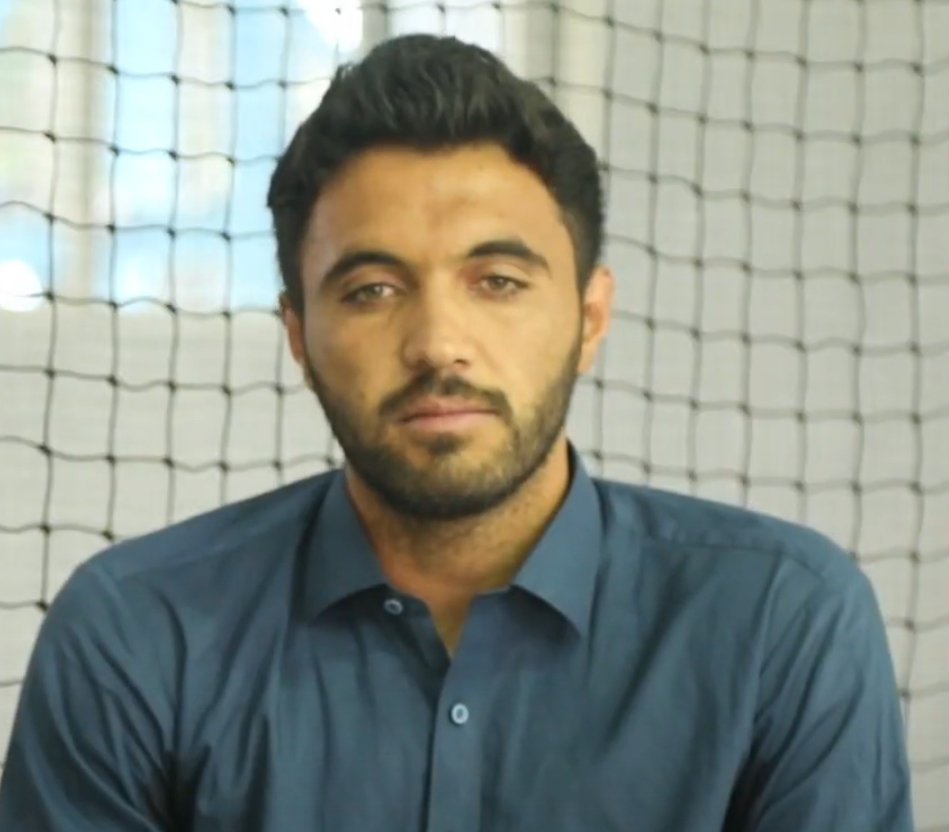
- Ahmadzai in 2020

Personal information
- Full name: Mohammad Yamin Ahmadzai
- Born: 25 July 1992 (age 34); Laghman Province, Afghanistan
- Batting: Right-handed
- Bowling: Right-arm medium-fast
- Role: Bowler

International information
- National side: Afghanistan (2015–present)
- Test debut (cap 11): 14 June 2018 v India
- Last Test: 20 October 2025 v Zimbabwe
- ODI debut (cap 37): 25 December 2015 v Zimbabwe
- Last ODI: 27 November 2022 v Sri Lanka
- T20I debut (cap 32): 29 November 2015 v Oman
- Last T20I: 30 November 2015 v Oman

Career statistics
Competition	Test	ODI	T20I	FC
Matches	8	9	2	63
Runs scored	77	9	1	962
Batting average	5.92	3.00	–	10.80
100s/50s	0/0	0/0	0/0	0/1
Top score	19	5	1*	54
Balls bowled	993	340	43	9,046
Wickets	16	7	5	217
Bowling average	32.00	43.42	13.00	21.77
5 wickets in innings	0	0	0	9
10 wickets in match	0	0	0	0
Best bowling	3/41	2/34	3/34	8/13
Catches/stumpings	1/–	4/–	0/–	31/–
- Source: Cricinfo, 19 July 2026

Mohammad Yamin Ahmadzai (Pashto: محمد یمین احمدزی) (born 25 July 1992) is an Afghan cricketer. Ahmadzai is a right-handed batsman who bowls right-arm medium-fast. He was born in Laghman Province. He was one of the eleven cricketers to play in Afghanistan's first ever Test match, against India, in June 2018, and took Afghanistan's first wicket in Test cricket.

== Career ==
Ahmadzai made his debut for Afghanistan Under-19s in a Youth One Day International against India Under-19s in the 2010 Under-19 World Cup in New Zealand. He made two further Youth One Day International appearances in that competition, against Hong Kong and Papua New Guinea. He also played for the Under-19s in the 2011 Under-19 World Cup Qualifier in Ireland, helping Afghanistan to qualify for the main event in 2012.

Later in 2011, he made his Twenty20 debut for the Afghan Cheetahs in the Faysal Bank Twenty-20 Cup against Multan Tigers. He scored an unbeaten single run in the Cheetahs innings, while in the Tigers innings he bowled a single over, conceding 17 runs from it.

He made his Twenty20 International debut for Afghanistan against Oman on 29 November 2015. He made his One Day International debut for Afghanistan against Zimbabwe on 25 December 2015.

He also plays first-class cricket for the Pakistan team Habib Bank Limited in the Quaid-e-Azam Trophy.

=== Test cricket ===
He made his Test debut in Afghanistan's inaugural Test match, played against India, on 14 June 2018. He took Afghanistan's first wicket in Test cricket, dismissing Shikhar Dhawan, just after lunch on day one. In February 2019, he was named in Afghanistan's Test squad for their one-off match against Ireland in India.
