= Ibrahim Zadran =

Afghan cricketer

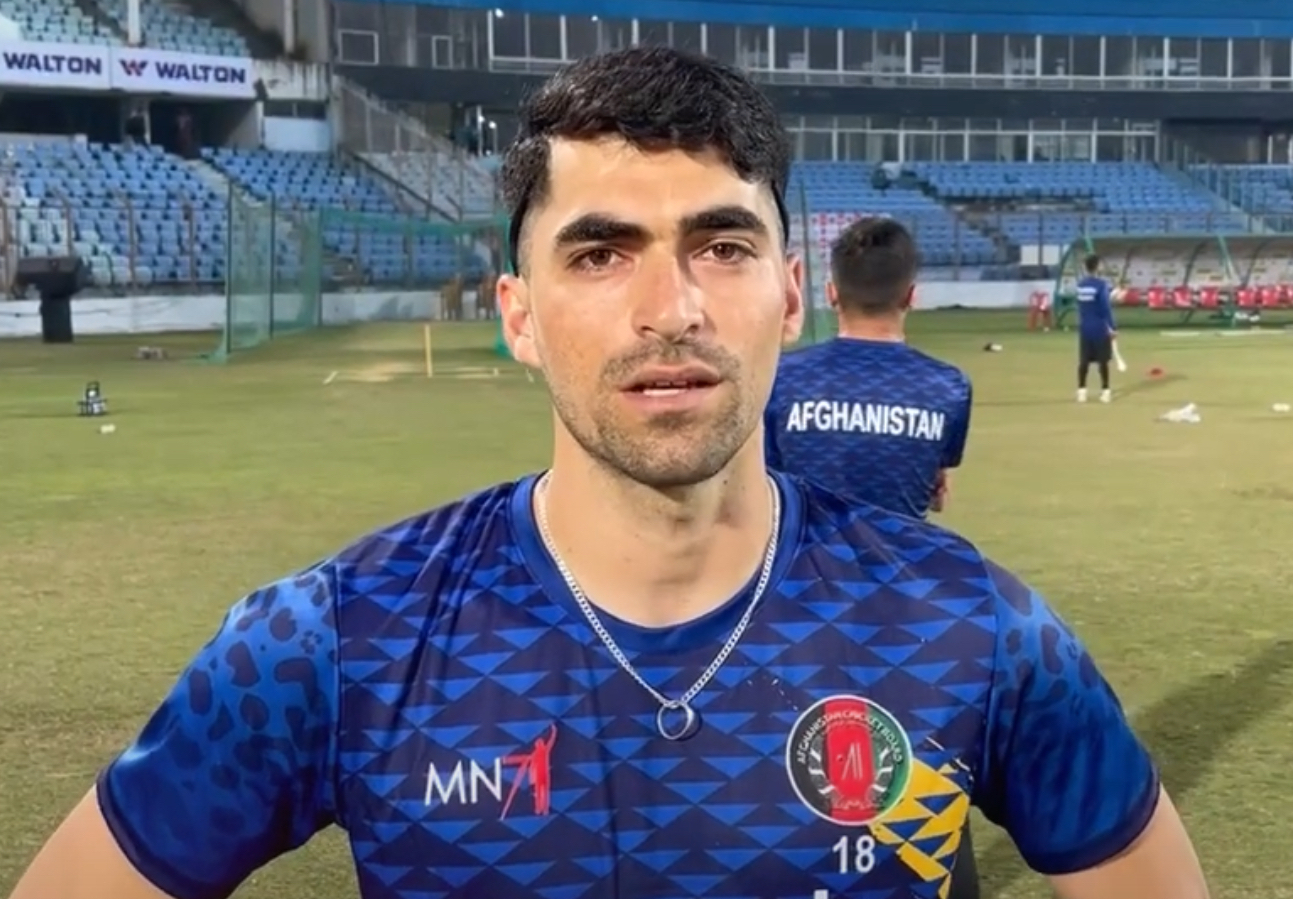
- Zadran in 2022

Personal information
- Born: 12 December 2001 (age 24); Khost, Afghanistan
- Batting: Right-handed
- Bowling: Right-arm medium-fast
- Role: Opening batter
- Relatives: Noor Ali Zadran (uncle); Mujeeb Ur Rahman (cousin)

International information
- National side: Afghanistan (2019–present)
- Test debut (cap 15): 5 September 2019 v Bangladesh
- Last Test: 20 October 2025 v Zimbabwe
- ODI debut (cap 48): 11 November 2019 v West Indies
- Last ODI: 21 October 2026 v Bangladesh
- ODI shirt no.: 18
- T20I debut (cap 41): 14 November 2019 v West Indies
- Last T20I: 17 September 2026 v India
- T20I shirt no.: 18

Domestic team information
- Years: Team
- 2017–present: Mis Ainak Knights (squad no. 109)

Career statistics
Competition	Test	ODI	T20I	FC
Matches	8	48	68	22
Runs scored	602	2,234	1,938	1,402
Batting average	37.62	49.64	32.84	38.84
100s/50s	1/4	7/11	0/16	3/8
Top score	114	177	95*	114
Balls bowled	12	–	–	150
Wickets	1	–	–	3
Bowling average	13.00	–	–	24.66
5 wickets in innings	0	–	–	0
10 wickets in match	0	–	–	0
Best bowling	1/13	–	–	1/13
Catches/stumpings	11/–	17/–	31/–	26/–
- Source: Cricinfo, 23 October 2026

Ibrahim Zadran (Pashto: ابراهیم ځدراڼ; born 12 December 2001) is an Afghan cricketer. He made his Test match debut for the Afghanistan cricket team in September 2019. He is the current Captain of Afghanistan Cricket Team in T20I cricket.

== Domestic career ==
He made his List A debut for Mis Ainak Region in the 2017 Ghazi Amanullah Khan Regional One Day Tournament on 11 August 2017. He made his Twenty20 debut for Mis Ainak Knights in the 2017 Shpageeza Cricket League on 12 September 2017.

In September 2018, he was named in Nangarhar's squad in the first edition of the Afghanistan Premier League tournament.

In 2021, Ibrahim played for Boyne Hill in Berkshire. He played as an opener and scored 479 runs in 15 matches.

== International career ==
In December 2017, he was named in Afghanistan's squad for the 2018 Under-19 Cricket World Cup. He was the leading run-scorer for Afghanistan in the tournament, with 186 runs.

In December 2018, he was named in Afghanistan's under-23 team for the 2018 ACC Emerging Teams Asia Cup.

In August 2019, he was named in Afghanistan's Test squad for their one-off match against Bangladesh. He made his Test debut, in the one-off match against Bangladesh, on 5 September 2019. The following month, he was named in Afghanistan's squads for their series against the West Indies. He made his One Day International (ODI) debut, against the West Indies, on 11 November 2019. He made his T20I debut for Afghanistan, also against the West Indies, on 14 November 2019.

In December 2019, he was named in Afghanistan's squad for the 2020 Under-19 Cricket World Cup. He was the leading run-scorer for Afghanistan in the tournament, with 240 runs in five matches. In June 2022, in the second match against Zimbabwe, Zadran scored his first century in ODI cricket, with an unbeaten 120 runs. In November 2022, he scored his second ODI century (106), against Sri Lanka in Pallekelle. He won the player of the match award. In the third match of the same series, he smashed 162 runs, breaking the record for highest score by a player from his country in this format. He ended the series with 278 runs at an average of 92.66, and won the player of the series award.

Six months later, in June 2023, he made 98 against Sri Lanka in the first match of the 2023 series, in Hambantota, winning the player of the match award. In four innings in Sri Lanka, he has scored 106, 10, 162 and 98.

He made his World Cup debut on 7 October 2023 against Bangladesh in India in the 2023 Cricket World Cup. He scored 22 runs off 24 balls in a losing cause. He played a match-winning knock against Pakistan, scoring 87 runs off 113 balls. He was declared payer of the match, which he dedicated to the Afghan refugees. Zadran made the highest ever score by an Afghan player in the ICC World Cup on 7 November 2023 against Australia at Wankhede Stadium, Mumbai by scoring 129 runs not out from 147 balls. This was Afghanistan's first century in a World Cup game.

In May 2024, he was named in Afghanistan's squad for the 2024 ICC Men's T20 World Cup tournament.

Zadran was named in Afghanistan's squad for the 2025 ICC Champions Trophy tournament. On 26 February 2025, Zadran scored 177 off of 146 balls against England during the tournament, the highest-ever individual score in the history of the tournament, surpassing Ben Duckett's score of 165 off of 143 balls, which Duckett had made only 4 days prior to the match in the same tournament.
