= Fareed Ahmad (cricketer) =

Afghan cricketer (born 1994)

Personal information
- Full name: Fareed Ahmad Malik
- Born: 10 August 1994 (age 32); Nangarhar, Afghanistan
- Batting: Left-handed
- Bowling: Left arm fast medium
- Role: Bowler

International information
- National side: Afghanistan (2014–present)
- Only Test (cap 36): 2 January 2025 v Zimbabwe
- ODI debut (cap 35): 2 December 2014 v UAE
- Last ODI: 20 June 2026 v India
- ODI shirt no.: 56
- T20I debut (cap 33): 14 December 2016 v UAE
- Last T20I: 2 November 2025 v Zimbabwe
- T20I shirt no.: 56

Domestic team information
- Years: Team
- 2017: Amo Region

Career statistics
Competition	Test	ODI	T20I	FC
Matches	1	20	38	32
Runs scored	19	46	33	641
Batting average	19.00	9.20	16.50	16.02
100s/50s	0/0	0/0	0/0	0/1
Top score	17	17	24*	68
Balls bowled	156	781	697	5,045
Wickets	2	25	47	117
Bowling average	35.50	29.28	21.40	27.83
5 wickets in innings	0	0	0	6
10 wickets in match	0	0	0	1
Best bowling	2/27	3/56	3/14	6/27
Catches/stumpings	0/–	3/–	6/–	13/–
Medal record
Men's Cricket
Representing Afghanistan
Asian Games
Silver medal – second place	2014 Incheon	Team
Silver medal – second place	2022 Hangzhou	Team
- Source: Cricinfo, 19 July 2026

Fareed Ahmad (Pashto: فرید احمد) (born 10 August 1994) is an Afghan cricketer. He made his One Day International (ODI) debut against the United Arab Emirates on 2 December 2014. He competed at the 2014 Asian Games. He made his Twenty20 International (T20I) debut for Afghanistan against the United Arab Emirates on 14 December 2016.

In September 2018, he was named in Kabul's squad in the first edition of the Afghanistan Premier League tournament. In September 2021, he was named as one of two travelling reserves in Afghanistan's squad for the 2021 ICC Men's T20 World Cup.

In May 2024, he was named in Afghanistan's squad for the 2024 ICC Men's T20 World Cup tournament.

== Controversies ==
During the 2022 Asia Cup match between Pakistan and Afghanistan, Asif Ali and Fareed were fined 25 per cent of their match fees for their on-field altercation after Fareed got Asif out. Both were punished for breaching Level 1 of the ICC Code of Conduct during the clash between Pakistan and Afghanistan. According to an ICC statement, Fareed breached Article 2.1.12, which relates to "inappropriate physical contact with a Player, Player Support Personnel, Umpire, Match Referee or any other person (including a spectator) during an International Match." Asif was found to have breached Article 2.6 of the ICC Code of Conduct for Players and Player Support Personnel, which relates to "using a gesture that is obscene, offensive or insulting during an International Match". Both players admitted their offence and accepted the sanctions proposed by match referee Andy Pycroft.
