= Afsar Zazai =

Afgan cricketer

Personal information
- Full name: Afsar Khan Zazai
- Born: 10 August 1993 (age 33); Kabul, Afghanistan
- Batting: Right-handed
- Role: Wicket-keeper

International information
- National side: Afghanistan (2012–present)
- Test debut (cap 1): 14 June 2018 v India
- Last Test: 6 June 2026 v India
- ODI debut (cap 34): 28 November 2014 v UAE
- Last ODI: 14 June 2017 v West Indies
- ODI shirt no.: 78
- T20I debut (cap 24): 11 October 2013 v Kenya
- Last T20I: 7 October 2023 v India
- T20I shirt no.: 40 (previously 78)

Domestic team information
- Years: Team
- 2017: Band-e-Amir Region
- 2017: Amo Sharks

Career statistics
Competition	Test	ODI	T20I	FC
Matches	10	17	8	56
Runs scored	378	264	141	3,086
Batting average	23.62	17.60	17.62	36.73
100s/50s	1/0	0/2	0/0	6/19
Top score	113	60	48	202
Catches/stumpings	23/1	20/2	0/2	138/15
Medal record
Representing Afghanistan
Men's Cricket
Asian Games
Silver medal – second place	2022 Hangzhou	Team
- Source: Cricinfo, 19 July 2026

Afsar Khan Zazai (Pashto: افسر ځاځی; born 10 August 1993) is an Afghan cricketer. Afsar is a right-handed wicket-keeper batsman who is known for his batting skills. He was one of the eleven cricketers to play in Afghanistan's first Test match, against India, in June 2018. He was the first Test cap for Afghanistan.

== International career ==
He effected nine dismissals in six games at the Under-19 World Cup qualifiers in September 2009. He was just 16 when he was included in the Afghanistan squad for 2010 Under-19s World Cup in New Zealand. In 2012, he played his second Under-19s World Cup in Australia.

He was just 18 when he made his first-class debut for Afghanistan in an Intercontinental Cup match in Sharjah. In the second innings, he scored an unbeaten 84, leading to Afghanistan's three-wicket win over The Netherlands.

The Netherlands were favorites to win when they had reduced Afghanistan to 111 for 6 in their chase of 233 on the second day. But Zazai did not give up and along with Mohammad Nabi’s 25 and Samiullah Shenwari’s 20 not out took Afghanistan to second position on the points table behind Ireland.

Afsar added 76 with Nabi and an unbroken 46 for the eighth wicket with Shenwari. He hit 13 boundaries in his unbeaten innings of 84 from 156 deliveries. Though Nabi fell to Michael Swart with the score on 187, Shenwari supported Afsar as he carried Afghanistan to the target.

He made his One Day International debut for Afghanistan against the United Arab Emirates on 28 November 2014.

In March 2017, he scored his maiden first-class century, when Afghanistan faced Ireland in round five of the 2015–17 ICC Intercontinental Cup.

In September 2018, he was named in Kabul's squad in the first edition of the Afghanistan Premier League tournament.

In May 2018, he was named in Afghanistan's squad for their inaugural Test match, played against India. He made his Test debut for Afghanistan, against India, on 14 June 2018.

In September 2021, he was named as one of two travelling reserves in Afghanistan's squad for the 2021 ICC Men's T20 World Cup.
