= Hashmatullah Shahidi =

Afghan cricketer

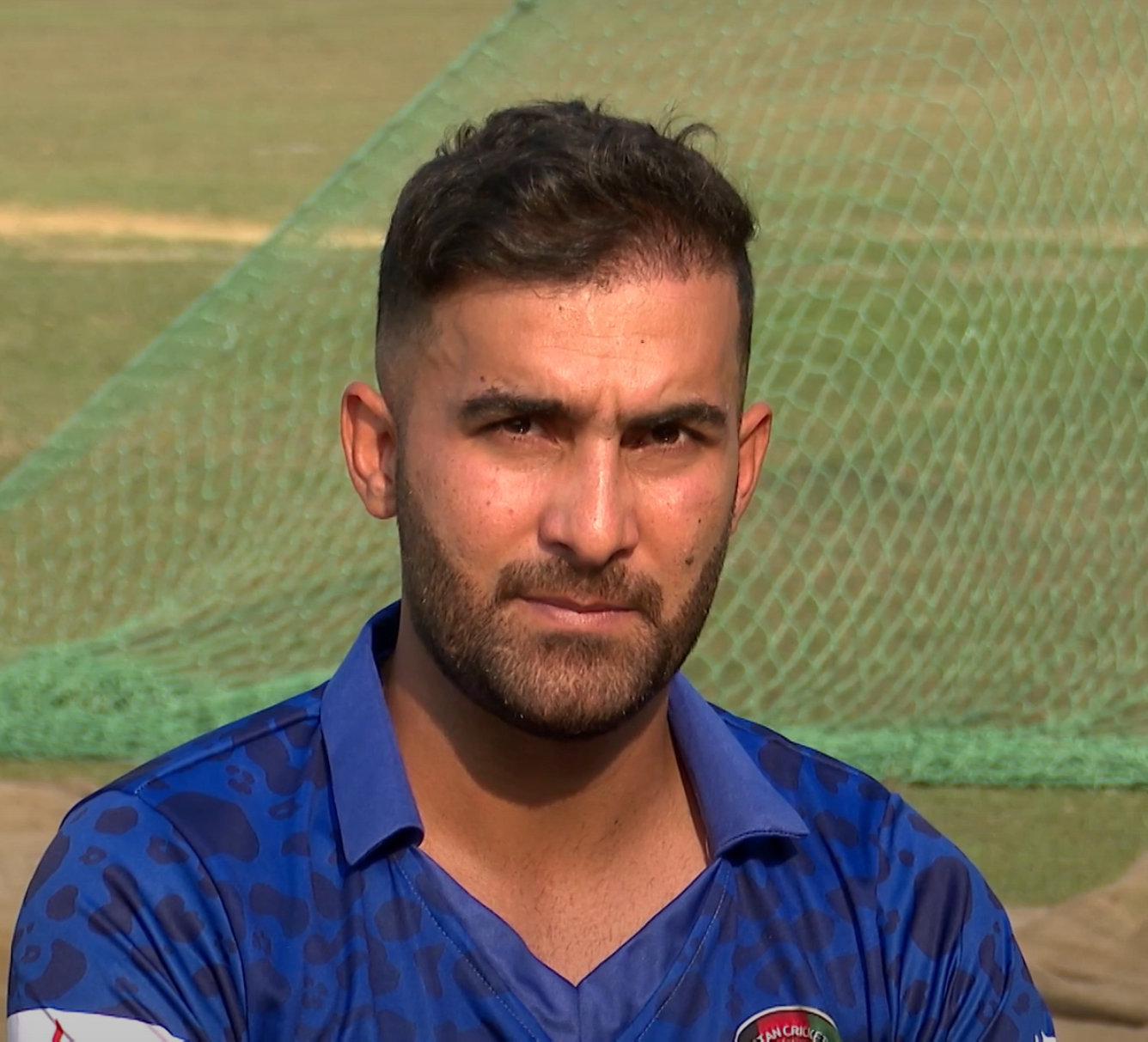
- Shahidi in 2022

Personal information
- Born: 4 November 1994 (age 32); Logar, Afghanistan
- Batting: Left-handed
- Bowling: Right arm off break
- Role: Top-order batter

International information
- National side: Afghanistan (2013–present)
- Test debut (cap 3): 14 June 2018 v India
- Last Test: 6 June 2026 v India
- ODI debut (cap 37): 2 October 2013 v Kenya
- Last ODI: 20 June 2026 v India
- ODI shirt no.: 50
- T20I debut (cap 32): 30 September 2013 v Kenya
- Last T20I: 11 August 2022 v Ireland
- T20I shirt no.: 50

Domestic team information
- Years: Team
- Amo Region
- Band-e-Amir Region

Career statistics
Competition	Test	ODI	T20I	FC
Matches	12	96	6	36
Runs scored	796	2,607	48	2,655
Batting average	44.22	33.42	24.00	46.57
100s/50s	2/2	1/22	0/0	10/6
Top score	246	102	36	246
Balls bowled	264	48	–	1,437
Wickets	1	0	–	21
Bowling average	164.00	–	–	40.33
5 wickets in innings	0	–	–	0
10 wickets in match	0	–	–	0
Best bowling	1/91	–	–	2/33
Catches/stumpings	4/–	20/–	1/–	20/–
- Source: ESPNcricinfo, 19 July 2026

Hashmatullah Shahidi (Pashto: حشمت الله شاهدي; born 4 November 1994) is an Afghan cricketer and currently the captain of Afghanistan national cricket team in One Day International (ODI) and Test cricket. He made his ODI debut for Afghanistan against Kenya in October 2013. Shahidi was one of the eleven cricketers to play in Afghanistan's first ever Test match, against India, in June 2018. He became the first Afghan player to score a test double hundred when he scored 200 not out against Zimbabwe on 11 March 2021.

== Career ==
In the final of the 2017–18 Ahmad Shah Abdali 4-day Tournament, batting for Band-e-Amir Region against Speen Ghar Region, he scored 163 runs in the first innings. He hit his first international six in the ODI series against Ireland in Ireland in May 2019, having previously scored 865 runs without hitting a six in an ODI.

In May 2018, he was named in Afghanistan's squad for their inaugural Test match, played against India. He made his Test debut against India, on 14 June 2018. He top scored in the second innings of the match with an unbeaten 36, albeit in a losing cause. Afghanistan lost the one-sided Test within two days. In February 2019, he was named in Afghanistan's Test squad for their one-off match against Ireland in India.

On 11 March 2021 he became the first Afghan player to score a test double hundred when he scored 200 not out in Afghanistan's first innings total of 545 for 4 in the Test against Zimbabwe.

In April 2019, he was named in Afghanistan's squad for the 2019 Cricket World Cup. On 18 June 2019, in the match against England, Hashmatullah scored his 1,000th run in ODIs.

In September 2021, he was named in Afghanistan's squad for the 2021 ICC Men's T20 World Cup.

In October 2023, he was named the captain of Afghanistan for the ODI Cricket World Cup. He managed to score just 18 runs in the first game of the tournament against Bangladesh. He played a brilliant inning against India scoring 80 runs off 88 balls. Shahidi played another splendid knock against Pakistan to see his team home by scoring 48 not out off just 45 balls. He was at his best against Sri Lanka, as he scored a half century in a must-win game. He came to bat when Afghanistan were 73-2 and remained not out till the end of the match along with Azmatullah.

Shahidi made 246 in the first of a two-match Test series against Zimbabwe in December 2024, the highest score by an Afghan batter in the format to date.

In June 2026, Shahidi scored his first ODI century in a match against India, which Afghanistan eventually lost by 9 wickets.
