= Azmatullah Omarzai =

Afghan cricketer

Personal information
- Born: 24 March 2000 (age 26); Kunar, Afghanistan
- Batting: Right-handed
- Bowling: Right-arm fast-medium
- Role: All-rounder

International information
- National side: Afghanistan (2021–present)
- Test debut (cap 35): 26 December 2024 v Zimbabwe
- Last Test: 6 June 2026 v India
- ODI debut (cap 49): 21 January 2021 v Ireland
- Last ODI: 23 October 2026 v Zimbabwe
- ODI shirt no.: 9
- T20I debut (cap 44): 3 March 2022 v Bangladesh
- Last T20I: 1 November 2026 v Zimbabwe
- T20I shirt no.: 9

Domestic team information
- Years: Team
- 2017–present: Mis Ainak Region (squad no. 99)
- 2023: Peshawar Zalmi (squad no. 100)
- 2023: Rangpur Riders
- 2024: Gujarat Titans
- 2024: Jaffna Kings
- 2025–present: Punjab Kings
- 2025: MI New York
- 2025/26: Sylhet Titans

Career statistics
Competition	Test	ODI	T20I	FC
Matches	2	51	72	7
Runs scored	4	1,262	1,041	153
Batting average	1.33	39.43	21.24	25.50
100s/50s	0/0	1/9	1/2	0/0
Top score	0	149*	116	40*
Balls bowled	264	1,686	1,058	864
Wickets	1	55	61	17
Bowling average	141.00	27.67	23.98	27.52
5 wickets in innings	0	1	0	0
10 wickets in match	0	0	0	0
Best bowling	1/66	5/58	4/9	4/73
Catches/stumpings	1/–	10/–	25/–	2/–
- Source: Cricinfo, 1 November 2026

Azmatullah Omarzai (Pashto: عظمت الله عمرزی born 24 March 2000) is an Afghan cricketer from Nurgal District of Kunar province in eastern Afghanistan. Azmatullah started playing cricket when he was 14 years old. He won the ICC Men's ODI Cricketer of the Year award in 2024.

He made his international debut for the Afghanistan cricket team in January 2021. He was part of the Afghan team in the 2023 Cricket World Cup.

He was awarded the ICC Men's ODI Cricketer of the Year in the 2024 ICC Awards.

== Domestic career ==
He made his List A debut for Mis Ainak Region in the 2017 Ghazi Amanullah Khan Regional One Day Tournament on 10 August 2017. He made his first-class debut for Speen Ghar Region in the 2018 Ahmad Shah Abdali 4-day Tournament on 25 March 2018.

In September 2018, he was named in Paktia's squad in the first edition of the Afghanistan Premier League tournament. He made his Twenty20 debut for Paktia Panthers in the 2018–19 Afghanistan Premier League on 7 October 2018. In September 2020, he was the joint winner of the player of the tournament award in the 2020 Shpageeza Cricket League.

== International career ==
In December 2017, he was named in Afghanistan's squad for the 2018 Under-19 Cricket World Cup. He was part of Afghanistan's under-23 team in the 2018 ACC Emerging Teams Asia Cup. In November 2019, he was named in Afghanistan's squad for the 2019 ACC Emerging Teams Asia Cup in Bangladesh. In February 2020, he was named in Afghanistan's Twenty20 International (T20I) squad for their series against Ireland. In January 2021, he was named in Afghanistan's One Day International (ODI) squad for their series against Ireland. He made his ODI debut for Afghanistan, against Ireland, on 21 January 2021.

In March 2021, the Afghanistan Cricket Board confirmed that he was pending selection for the T20I matches against Zimbabwe, once his visa issues had been resolved. In February 2022, he was named in Afghanistan's T20I squad for their series against Bangladesh. He made his T20I debut on 3 March 2022, for Afghanistan against Bangladesh.

In May 2024, he was named in Afghanistan's squad for the 2024 ICC Men's T20 World Cup tournament. In January 2025, Omarzai was named in Afghanistan's squad for the team's first-ever ICC Champions Trophy.

In October 2026, During the 2nd T20I against Zimbabwe, Omarzai hit his first T20I century off just 44 balls, rescuing Afghanistan from 5/4 all the way to 221/7. Omarzai, along with batter Ijaz Ahmad Ahmadzai, put up 142 runs for the 6th wicket, which is the record for most runs scored in a T20I for the 6th wicket. He won player of the match, as Afghanistan beat Zimbabwe by 19 runs.
