= 2018 Ahmad Shah Abdali 4-day Tournament =

Cricket tournament

- Dates: 1 March 2018 – 12 May 2018
- Administrator(s): Afghanistan Cricket Board (ACB)
- Cricket format: First-class
- Tournament format(s): Round-robin and final
- Host(s): Afghanistan
- Champions: Band-e-Amir Region (2nd title)
- Participants: 6
- Matches: 31
- Player of the series: Abdul Wasi
- Most runs: Darwish Rasooli (1,073)
- Most wickets: Amir Hamza (67)

The 2018 Ahmad Shah Abdali 4-day Tournament was an edition of the Ahmad Shah Abdali 4-day Tournament, a cricket tournament in Afghanistan. It was the second edition of the competition to be played with first-class status. The tournament started on 1 March 2018 and finished on 12 May 2018. Six regional teams, one more than the previous tournament, competed in a round-robin format with the top two teams in the group progressing to the final. Band-e-Amir Region were the defending champions.

In the round seven fixture between Kabul Region and Boost Region, Kabul batsman Shafiqullah scored the fastest double century in first-class cricket. He scored 200 not out from 89 balls, and also hit the most sixes (24) in a first-class match.

The final was played between Amo Region and Band-e-Amir Region. The match finished in a draw, with Band-e-Amir Region declared the winners based on a first innings lead, and therefore defending their title.

== Points table ==
Team	Pld	W	L	D	NR	Pts
Amo Region	10	6	2	2	0	134
Band-e-Amir Region	10	4	2	4	0	132
Mis Ainak Region	10	4	2	4	0	123
Speen Ghar Region	10	4	3	3	0	95
Boost Region	10	1	6	3	0	62
Kabul Region	10	1	5	4	0	54

Team qualified for the Final

== Fixtures ==
=== Round 1 ===
1–4 March 2018
Scorecard

Speen Ghar Region	v	Kabul Region
217 (56.3 overs); Najeeb Tarakai 59 (57); Mohammad Inamullah 5/55 (19 overs)		222 (58 overs); Shawkat Zaman 81 (123); Qais Ahmad 6/98 (19 overs)
243 (66.1 overs); Zahidullah 53 (102); Mohammad Inamullah 4/68 (17.1 overs)		209 (54.5 overs); Karim Janat 64 (99); Qais Ahmad 4/42 (11.5 overs)

Speen Ghar Region won by 29 runs
Ghazi Amanullah International Cricket Stadium, Ghazi Amanullah Town
Umpires: Bismillah Jan Shinwari and Abdullah
Player of the match: Qais Ahmad (Speen Ghar Region)

- Speen Ghar Region won the toss and elected to bat.
- Zahidullah, Tariq Stanikzai, Ikram Alikhil and Qais Ahmad (Speen Ghar Region) all made their first-class debuts.

1–4 March 2018
Scorecard

Band-e-Amir Region	v	Amo Region
442 (101.5 overs); Hashmatullah Shahidi 120 (197); Abdul Wasi 6/198 (41 overs)		343 (89.4 overs); Darwish Rasooli 154 (239); Nijat Masood 5/98 (20.4 overs)
54/2d (9 overs); Usman Ghani 17 (19); Fazalhaq Farooqi 2/25 (4 overs)

Match drawn
Kunar Cricket Ground, Kunar
Umpires: Izatullah Safi and Ajmal Shamolzi
Player of the match: Abdul Wasi (Amo Region)

- Band-e-Amir Region won the toss and elected to bat.
- Ibrahim Zadran (Band-e-Amir Region), Darwish Rasooli, Nisar Wahdat and Abdul Wasi (Amo Region) all made their first-class debuts.

1–4 March 2018
Scorecard

Boost Region	v	Mis Ainak Region
356 (107.2 overs); Nasir Khan 139 (259); Ihsanullah Ihsan 3/36 (14 overs)		242/9 (75.1 overs); Fazal Niazai 71 (96); Abdul Baqi 5/106 (26.1 overs)

Match drawn
Khost Cricket Stadium, Khost
Umpires: Mahmood Kharoti and Rab Nawaz Ghaznavi
Player of the match: Nasir Khan (Boost Region)

- Mis Ainak Region won the toss and elected to field.
- Only 1.2 overs of play were possible on day 1 and no play was possible on day 2 due to rain.
- Rahmanullah Gurbaz, Rahmanullah (Mis Ainak Region) and Waqarullah Ishaq (Boost Region) all made their first-class debuts.

=== Round 2 ===
7–10 March 2018
Scorecard

Amo Region	v	Speen Ghar Region
478 (103.1 overs); Darwish Rasooli 249 (271); Fareed Ahmad 3/82 (17 overs)		358 (94.3 overs); Tahir Khan 83 (144); Abdul Wasi 4/82 (26 overs)
261 (83.2 overs); Darwish Rasooli 62 (95); Tariq Stanikzai 3/45 (17 overs)		130/5 (42 overs); Shabir Noori 35 (58); Zohaib Ahmadzai 3/44 (16 overs)

Match drawn
Ghazi Amanullah International Cricket Stadium, Ghazi Amanullah Town
Umpires: Abdullah and Farooq Khan
Player of the match: Darwish Rasooli (Amo Region)

- Amo Region won the toss and elected to bat.

7–10 March 2018
Scorecard

Boost Region	v	Kabul Region
370 (105.3 overs); Waqarullah Ishaq 90* (153); Arif Khan 3/54 (15 overs)		342 (91.5 overs); Arif Khan 144 (214); Sayed Shirzad 6/45 (19 overs)
304 (88.5 overs); Waheedullah Shafaq 87 (86); Naveen-ul-Haq 3/84 (22.5 overs)		334/6 (57.4 overs); Karim Janat 102* (72); Abdul Baqi 2/56 (8 overs)

Kabul Region won by 4 wickets
Kunar Cricket Ground, Kunar
Umpires: Izatullah Safi and Irshad Omari
Player of the match: Karim Janat (Kabul Region)

- Kabul Region won the toss and elected to field.
- Shamsurrahman and Naveen-ul-Haq (Kabul Region) both made their first-class debuts.

7–10 March 2018
Scorecard

Mis Ainak Region	v	Band-e-Amir Region
292 (76.1 overs); Rahmatullah Sahaq 114 (196); Fitratullah Khawari 5/122 (20.1 overs)		301 (69.5 overs); Hazratullah Zazai 65 (56); Zia-ur-Rehman 3/36 (19.5 overs)
279 (85.4 overs); Rahmanullah Gurbaz 93 (150); Amir Hamza 4/70 (33 overs)		149 (43.2 overs); Younas Ahmadzai 35 (64); Zia-ur-Rehman 5/28 (17 overs)

Mis Ainak Region won by 121 runs
Khost Cricket Stadium, Khost
Umpires: Ahmed Shah Durrani and Mohammad Shah Fazalyar
Player of the match: Zia-ur-Rehman (Mis Ainak Region)

- Mis Ainak Region won the toss and elected to bat.
- Naveed Obaid (Mis Ainak Region) made his first-class debut.

=== Round 3 ===
13–16 March 2018
Scorecard

Amo Region	v	Boost Region
288 (76.5 overs); Nisar Wahdat 68 (131); Yamin Ahmadzai 5/50 (15.3 overs)		184 (69.4 overs); Waheedullah Shafaq 80 (137); Abdul Wasi 4/30 (15.4 overs)
384/2d (75 overs); Darwish Rasooli 200* (182); Yamin Ahmadzai 1/44 (9 overs)		206 (52 overs); Karim Sadiq 75 (84); Abdul Wasi 6/91 (17 overs)

Amo Region won by 282 runs
Ghazi Amanullah International Cricket Stadium, Ghazi Amanullah Town
Umpires: Bismillah Jan Shinwari and Farooq Khan
Player of the match: Abdul Wasi (Amo Region)

- Boost Region won the toss and elected to field.
- Ahmad Zahir (Boost Region) made his first-class debut.

13–16 March 2018
Scorecard

Mis Ainak Region	v	Kabul Region
515 (124.3 overs); Shahidullah 144 (184); Arif Khan 3/80 (18 overs)		407 (106.4 overs); Khaibar Omar 95 (178); Zia-ur-Rehman 4/111 (37 overs)
143/2 (32 overs); Rahmanullah Gurbaz 69 (55); Naveen-ul-Haq 1/5 (6 overs)

Match drawn
Kunar Cricket Ground, Kunar
Umpires: Irshaduddin and Izatullah Safi
Player of the match: Shahidullah (Mis Ainak Region)

- Mis Ainak Region won the toss and elected to bat.
- Fareed Zargar (Mis Ainak Region) made his first-class debut.

13–16 March 2018
Scorecard

Band-e-Amir Region	v	Speen Ghar Region
251 (76 overs); Ibrahim Zadran 60 (105); Fareed Ahmad 3/39 (14 overs)		206 (46.2 overs); Najeeb Tarakai 38 (22); Fitratullah Khawari 3/33 (7.2 overs)
222 (66.2 overs); Zia-ul-Haq 50 (101); Zamir Khan 3/18 (10.2 overs)		251 (67.4 overs); Najeeb Tarakai 84 (98); Amir Hamza 4/67 (24.4 overs)

Band-e-Amir Region won by 16 runs
Khost Cricket Stadium, Khost
Umpires: Ihsanullah Danish and Ahmed Shah Durrani
Player of the match: Amir Hamza (Band-e-Amir Region)

- Speen Ghar Region won the toss and elected to field.
- Perwez Malikzai (Speen Ghar Region) and Yousuf Zazai (Band-e-Amir Region) both made their first-class debuts.

=== Round 4 ===
19–22 March 2018
Scorecard

Mis Ainak Region	v	Amo Region
312 (85.4 overs); Shahidullah 68 (127); Abdul Wasi 5/113 (28 overs)		270 (74.1 overs); Haji Murad Muradi 97 (135); Ihsanullah Ihsan 3/50 (29.1 overs)
250 (58 overs); Rahmatullah Sahaq 103* (122); Jamshid Khan 4/70 (20 overs)		231 (78.2 overs); Abdul Wasi 89 (158); Zia-ur-Rehman 7/70 (30.2 overs)

Mis Ainak Region won by 61 runs
Ghazi Amanullah International Cricket Stadium, Ghazi Amanullah Town
Umpires: Rab Nawaz Ghaznavi and Farooq Khan
Player of the match: Zia-ur-Rehman (Mis Ainak Region)

- Mis Ainak Region won the toss and elected to bat.

19–22 March 2018
Scorecard

Band-e-Amir Region	v	Kabul Region
577 (130.2 overs); Khalid Zahedi 105 (149); Naveen-ul-Haq 4/127 (26 overs)		344 (88 overs); Bahar Shinwari 88 (136); Fitratullah Khawari 5/106 (29 overs)
258/9d (52 overs); Usman Ghani 96 (102); Karim Janat 3/49 (8 overs)		466/8 (90 overs); Imran Janat 200 (223); Amir Hamza 3/146 (40 overs)

Match drawn
Kunar Cricket Ground, Kunar
Umpires: Mujahid Shorash and Irshad Omari
Player of the match: Imran Janat (Kabul Region)

- Band-e-Amir Region won the toss and elected to bat.

19–22 March 2018
Scorecard

Boost Region	v	Speen Ghar Region
137 (37.1 overs); Nazir Ahmad 41 (66); Najeeb Tarakai 3/3 (4.1 overs)		166 (49 overs); Ikram Alikhil 55 (123); Sayed Shirzad 6/48 (16 overs)
123/3 (22 overs); Nasir Khan 50* (46); Najeeb Tarakai 1/6 (2 overs)

Match drawn
Khost Cricket Stadium, Khost
Umpires: Mohammad Shah Fazalyar and Ahmed Shah Durrani
Player of the match: Sayed Shirzad (Boost Region)

- Speen Ghar Region won the toss and elected to field.
- No play was possible on day one due to rain.

=== Round 5 ===
25–28 March 2018
Scorecard

Band-e-Amir Region	v	Boost Region
166 (51.2 overs); Hazratullah Zazai 62 (57); Mohammad Alam 4/18 (12.2 overs)		99 (40.3 overs); Munir Ahmad 36 (81); Amir Hamza 6/33 (20 overs)
221 (68.4 overs); Usman Ghani 95 (137); Mohammad Alam 5/61 (25 overs)		154 (51.3 overs); Nazir Ahmad 45 (94); Fitratullah Khawari 5/57 (20.3 overs)

Band-e-Amir Region won by 134 runs
Ghazi Amanullah International Cricket Stadium, Ghazi Amanullah Town
Umpires: Tasal Shinwari and Rab Nawaz Ghaznavi
Player of the match: Amir Hamza (Band-e-Amir Region)

- Band-e-Amir Region won the toss and elected to bat.

25–28 March 2018
Scorecard

Mis Ainak Region	v	Speen Ghar Region
358 (93.1 overs); Rahmanullah Gurbaz 96 (149); Fareed Ahmad 4/47 (17.1 overs)		261 (63.4 overs); Ikram Alikhil 103* (152); Fareed Zargar 3/75 (16.4 overs)
244 (67.3 overs); Rahmanullah Gurbaz 52 (96); Qais Ahmad 6/74 (19.3 overs)		342/7 (98.3 overs); Bahir Shah 72 (130); Fareed Zargar 3/112 (29 overs)

Speen Ghar Region won by 3 wickets
Kunar Cricket Ground, Kunar
Umpires: Irshad Omari and Izatullah Safi
Player of the match: Ikram Alikhil (Speen Ghar Region)

- Mis Ainak Region won the toss and elected to bat.
- Azmatullah Omarzai (Speen Ghar Region) made his first-class debut.

25–28 March 2018
Scorecard

Kabul Region	v	Amo Region
121 (33.3 overs); Bahar Shinwari 40 (35); Jamshid Khan 4/35 (13.3 overs)		224 (62 overs); Nisar Wahdat 64 (130); Karim Janat 4/50 (15 overs)
210 (52.4 overs); Qasim Oryakhail 39 (115); Jamshid Khan 5/104 (22.4 overs)		108/1 (17 overs); Fazal Zazai 44 (41); Abdullah Mazari 1/34 (5 overs)

Amo Region won by 9 wickets
Khost Cricket Stadium, Khost
Umpires: Ihsanullah Danish and Ahmed Shah Durrani
Player of the match: Jamshid Khan (Amo Region)

- Amo Region won the toss and elected to field.

=== Round 6 ===
1–4 April 2018
Scorecard

Speen Ghar Region	v	Kabul Region
242 (71.2 overs); Bahir Shah 54 (85); Shamsurrahman 4/80 (18 overs)		165 (61.2 overs); Shafiqullah 43 (51); Tahir Khan 3/2 (3 overs)
272 (82.5 overs); Bahir Shah 102* (211); Mohammad Inamullah 5/72 (30 overs)		192 (71.5 overs); Imran Janat 88 (166); Tariq Stanikzai 6/22 (12.5 overs)

Speen Ghar Region won by 157 runs
Ghazi Amanullah International Cricket Stadium, Ghazi Amanullah Town
Umpires: Muhammad Sabir and Rab Nawaz Ghaznavi
Player of the match: Tariq Stanikzai (Speen Ghar Region)

- Speen Ghar Region won the toss and elected to bat.

1–4 April 2018
Scorecard

Amo Region	v	Band-e-Amir Region
324 (75.5 overs); Haji Murad Muradi 71 (74); Amir Hamza 4/126 (34 overs)		506 (118.1 overs); Hashmatullah Shahidi 161 (247); Zahid Zakhail 3/74 (24 overs)
272 (69 overs); Farhan Zakhil 97 (172); Amir Hamza 6/52 (27 overs)		96/3 (15.2 overs); Hazratullah Zazai 62 (41); Darwish Rasooli 2/10 (1.2 overs)

Band-e-Amir Region won by 7 wickets
Kabul International Cricket Stadium, Kabul
Umpires: Irshad Omari and Ajmal Shamolzi
Player of the match: Hashmatullah Shahidi (Band-e-Amir Region)

- Band-e-Amir Region won the toss and elected to field.
- Tahsin Sultani (Band-e-Amir Region) made his first-class debut.

1–4 April 2018
Scorecard

Boost Region	v	Mis Ainak Region
188 (61.5 overs); Nasir Khan 77* (171); Zia-ur-Rehman 5/38 (23.5 overs)		157 (50.5 overs); Rahmanullah Gurbaz 40 (82); Mohammad Alam 5/38 (17.5 overs)
261 (72.3 overs); Nasir Jamal 75 (97); Fareed Zargar 3/58 (11.3 overs)		294/6 (81.4 overs); Shahidullah 61 (122); Mohammad Alam 2/90 (34 overs)

Mis Ainak Region won by 4 wickets
Khost Cricket Stadium, Khost
Umpires: Mehmood Kharotai and Mohammad Shah Fazalyar
Player of the match: Zia-ur-Rehman (Mis Ainak Region)

- Boost Region won the toss and elected to bat.
- Asadullah (Mis Ainak Region) and Mohammad Sabir (Boost Region) both made their first-class debuts.

=== Round 7 ===
8–11 April 2018
Scorecard

Speen Ghar Region	v	Amo Region
270 (105.4 overs); Zahidullah 118 (246); Sharafuddin Ashraf 5/79 (43.4 overs)		449 (122.4 overs); Fazal Zazai 137 (149); Qais Ahmad 3/79 (26 overs)
297 (82 overs); Zahidullah 106 (184); Jamshid Khan 5/155 (35 overs)		120/4 (13.1 overs); Sharafuddin Ashraf 64* (28); Tariq Stanikzai 3/48 (7 overs)

Amo Region won by 6 wickets
Ghazi Amanullah International Cricket Stadium, Ghazi Amanullah Town
Umpires: Ahmed Shah Durrani and Ahmed Shah Pakteen
Player of the match: Sharafuddin Ashraf (Amo Region)

- Speen Ghar Region won the toss and elected to bat.
- Naseeb Dawlatzai (Speen Ghar Region) and Riaz Hassan (Amo Region) both made their first-class debuts.

8–11 April 2018
Scorecard

Kabul Region	v	Boost Region
413 (106.1 overs); Said Mutabar 98 (233); Sayed Shirzad 3/95 (20 overs)		250 (62 overs); Waheedullah Shafaq 80 (101); Shamsurrahman 3/37 (12 overs)
312/5 (45 overs); Shafiqullah 200* (89); Sayed Shirzad 2/33 (10 overs)

Match drawn
Kabul International Cricket Stadium, Kabul
Umpires: Izatullah Safi and Farooq Khan
Player of the match: Shafiqullah (Kabul Region)

- Boost Region won the toss and elected to field.

8–11 April 2018
Scorecard

Band-e-Amir Region	v	Mis Ainak Region
403 (115.1 overs); Zia-ul-Haq 148 (253); Zia-ur-Rehman 4/89 (41 overs)		484 (153.3 overs); Asadullah 102 (265); Zia-ul-Haq 3/59 (18 overs)
230/6 (51.1 overs); Ihsanullah 62 (67); Zia-ur-Rehman 4/79 (22.1 overs)

Match drawn
Khost Cricket Stadium, Khost
Umpires: Mehmood Kharotai and Ajmal Shamolzi
Player of the match: Zia-ul-Haq (Band-e-Amir Region)

- Band-e-Amir Region won the toss and elected to bat.
- Imran Mohammadi (Band-e-Amir Region) made his first-class debut.

=== Round 8 ===
15–18 April 2018
Scorecard

Amo Region	v	Boost Region
151 (51.3 overs); Darwish Rasooli 54 (59); Abdul Baqi 6/43 (15.3 overs)		245 (70 overs); Najibullah Zadran 63 (46); Sharafuddin Ashraf 3/56 (21 overs)
258 (63.5 overs); Javed Ahmadi 129 (133); Abdul Baqi 8/76 (19.5 overs)		89 (28.5 overs); Waheedullah Shafaq 29 (43); Sharafuddin Ashraf 7/38 (9.5 overs)

Amo Region won by 75 runs
Ghazi Amanullah International Cricket Stadium, Ghazi Amanullah Town
Umpires: Muhammad Sabir and Ahmed Shah Pakteen
Player of the match: Sharafuddin Ashraf (Amo Region)

- Amo Region won the toss and elected to bat.

15–18 April 2018
Scorecard

Kabul Region	v	Mis Ainak Region
389 (98.3 overs); Ghamai Zadran 93 (148); Gulbadin Naib 5/87 (25.3 overs)		449/5 (65.1 overs); Shahidullah 126 (141); Javed Zadran 2/84 (16 overs)

Match drawn
Kabul International Cricket Stadium, Kabul
Umpires: Ahmed Shah Durrani and Irshad Omari
Player of the match: Gulbadin Naib (Mis Ainak Region)

- Kabul Region won the toss and elected to bat.

15–18 April 2018
Scorecard

Speen Ghar Region	v	Band-e-Amir Region
249 (63.5 overs); Zahidullah 65 (97); Amir Hamza 5/92 (28 overs)		503/6 (122 overs); Zia-ul-Haq 105 (178); Zahir Shehzad 2/106 (28 overs)

Match drawn
Khost Cricket Stadium, Khost
Umpires: Rab Nawaz Ghaznavi and Mahmood Kharoti
Player of the match: Amir Hamza (Band-e-Amir Region)

- Band-e-Amir Region won the toss and elected to field.
- Mohammad Ishaq (Speen Ghar Region) made his first-class debut.

=== Round 9 ===
22–25 April 2018
Scorecard

Amo Region	v	Mis Ainak Region
178 (46.5 overs); Abdul Malik 37 (29); Fazal Niazai 5/44 (11 overs)		91/9d (43 overs); Gulbadin Naib 30 (89); Sharafuddin Ashraf 4/23 (16 overs)
188 (48.5 overs); Asadullah Matani 55 (75); Nasir Totakhil 4/71 (21 overs)		187 (70 overs); Naveed Obaid 41 (28); Sharafuddin Ashraf 3/49 (21 overs)

Amo Region won by 88 runs
Ghazi Amanullah International Cricket Stadium, Ghazi Amanullah Town
Umpires: Izatullah Safi and Muhammad Sabir
Player of the match: Sharafuddin Ashraf (Amo Region)

- Amo Region won the toss and elected to bat.

22–25 April 2018
Scorecard

Band-e-Amir Region	v	Kabul Region
474 (102.4 overs); Muslim Musa 166 (195); Abdullah Mazari 5/137 (24 overs)		262 (94.5 overs); Said Mutabar 79 (264); Sayed Nasratullah 5/54 (17.5 overs)
249 (72.3 overs); Usman Ghani 117 (131); Mohammad Inamullah 4/78 (24 overs)		161 (34.3 overs); Shawkat Zaman 36 (32); Amir Hamza 5/51 (17 overs)

Band-e-Amir Region won by 300 runs
Kabul International Cricket Stadium, Kabul
Umpires: Farooq Khan and Irshaduddin
Player of the match: Muslim Musa (Band-e-Amir Region)

- Band-e-Amir Region won the toss and elected to bat.
- Kashmir Khan (Kabul Region) made his first-class debut.

22–25 April 2018
Scorecard

Boost Region	v	Speen Ghar Region
121 (39.3 overs); Munir Ahmad 75 (102); Fareed Ahmad 4/47 (14 overs)		282 (55 overs); Najeeb Tarakai 103 (72); Dastagir Khan 4/48 (12 overs)
330 (100 overs); Munir Ahmad 210 (302); Tariq Stanikzai 6/58 (23 overs)		172/4 (47.2 overs); Zubaid Akbari 40 (91); Abdul Rahman 2/32 (14 overs)

Speen Ghar Region won by 6 wickets
Khost Cricket Stadium, Khost
Umpires: Mahmood Kharoti and Ajmal Shamolzi
Player of the match: Tariq Stanikzai (Speen Ghar Region)

- Speen Ghar Region won the toss and elected to field.
- Zubaid Akbari, Akbar Musazai, Irshad (Speen Ghar Region), Abdul Malik and Bahi Khan (Boost Region) all made their first-class debuts.

=== Round 10 ===
29 April–2 May 2018
Scorecard

Band-e-Amir Region	v	Boost Region
214 (68.1 overs); Tahsin Sultani 58 (61); Rokhan Barakzai 6/52 (23 overs)		308 (78.4 overs); Nasir Jamal 120 (150); Amir Hamza 6/101 (32.4 overs)
290 (75.1 overs); Ibrahim Zadran 105 (106); Rokhan Barakzai 4/57 (23 overs)		197/4 (41.5 overs); Najibullah Zadran 67 (89); Khalid Zahedi 1/5 (4 overs)

Boost Region won by 6 wickets
Ghazi Amanullah International Cricket Stadium, Ghazi Amanullah Town
Umpires: Ahmed Shah Pakteen and Bismillah Jan Shinwari
Player of the match: Rokhan Barakzai (Boost Region)

- Band-e-Amir Region won the toss and elected to bat.
- Abdul Naseri (Band-e-Amir Region) made his first-class debut.

29 April–2 May 2018
Scorecard

Mis Ainak Region	v	Speen Ghar Region
331 (97.4 overs); Rahmanullah 68 (125); Zubaid Akbari 2/23 (4.4 overs)		211 (52.2 overs); Zahidullah 57* (79); Nasir Totakhil 3/40 (10 overs)
274 (81.5 overs); Fazal Niazai 63* (99); Zahir Shehzad 4/59 (21 overs)		100 (19.1 overs); Zahidullah 36 (27); Amir Zazai 6/56 (7.1 overs)

Mis Ainak Region won by 294 runs
Kabul International Cricket Stadium, Kabul
Umpires: Farooq Khan and Muhammad Sabir
Player of the match: Amir Zazai (Mis Ainak Region)

- Mis Ainak Region won the toss and elected to bat.
- Barakatullah Kadada, Amir Zazai, Sadiqullah Patan (Mis Ainak Region) and Zahidullah Salmi (Speen Ghar Region) all made their first-class debuts.

29 April–2 May 2018
Scorecard

Kabul Region	v	Amo Region
184 (41.1 overs); Rahim Mangal 33 (52); Jamshid Khan 6/69 (15 overs)		500/7d (112 overs); Sharafuddin Ashraf 125 (117); Mohammad Inamullah 3/103 (29 overs)
202 (49.5 overs); Noor-ul-Haq 59 (98); Sharafuddin Ashraf 3/38 (13 overs)

Amo Region won by an innings and 114 runs
Khost Cricket Stadium, Khost
Umpires: Ajmal Shamolzi and Rab Nawaz Ghaznavi
Player of the match: Sharafuddin Ashraf (Amo Region)

- Kabul Region won the toss and elected to bat.

== Final ==
8–12 May 2018
Scorecard

Amo Region	v	Band-e-Amir Region
280 (97.2 overs); Haji Murad Muradi 89 (192); Farmanullah 5/60 (19.2 overs)		407 (138.1 overs); Asif Musazai 134 (335); Abdul Wasi 4/125 (46.1 overs)
420/8d (112 overs); Fazal Zazai 155 (259); Fitratullah Khawari 5/79 (24 overs)		180/5 (88 overs); Asif Musazai 35 (160); Jamshid Khan 2/42 (34 overs)

Match drawn
(Band-e-Amir Region won on 1st innings)
Ghazi Amanullah International Cricket Stadium, Ghazi Amanullah Town
Umpires: Bismillah Jan Shinwari and Mehmood Kharotai
Player of the match: Zia-ul-Haq (Band-e-Amir Region)

- Amo Region won the toss and elected to bat.
- Kamran Hotak (Band-e-Amir Region) made his first-class debut.
