= 2019 Shpageeza Cricket League =

Cricket tournament

- Dates: 7 – 18 October 2019
- Administrator(s): Afghanistan Cricket Board (ACB)
- Cricket format: Twenty20
- Tournament format(s): Round-robin and playoffs
- Host(s): Afghanistan
- Champions: Mis Ainak Knights (1st title)
- Participants: 6
- Matches: 19
- Most runs: Noor Ali Zadran (354)
- Most wickets: Nijat Masood (11)

The 2019 season of the Shpageeza Cricket League was the sixth edition of the Shpageeza, a professional Twenty20 cricket (T20) league established by the Afghanistan Cricket Board (ACB) in 2013, and the second edition to have official T20 status. The tournament featured the six regional teams that played in the previous season. The event took place between 9 and 18 October 2019, with the Alokozay Kabul International Cricket Ground hosting all the matches. The number of overseas players participating was significantly reduced from the previous edition, with the subsequent launch of the Afghanistan Premier League making that the main franchise Twenty20 league run by the ACB.

Mis Ainak Knights won the tournament, after they beat Band-e-Amir Dragons by four wickets in the final. Noor Ali Zadran (Mis Ainak Knights) was the leading run-scorer in the tournament with 354, and Nijat Masood (Band-e-Amir Dragons) took the most wickets with 11.

== Round-robin ==
=== Points table ===
Team	Pld	W	L	T	NRR	Pts
Mis Ainak Knights	5	4	1	0	+0.317	8
Band-e-Amir Dragons	5	3	2	0	+1.079	6
Kabul Eagles	5	3	2	0	+0.542	6
Speen Ghar Tigers	5	2	3	0	+0.217	4
Amo Sharks	5	2	3	0	–0.230	4
Boost Defenders	5	1	4	0	–1.982	2

=== Fixtures ===
7 October 2019
09:00
Scorecard

Kabul Eagles; 209/4 (20 overs)	v	Band-e-Amir Dragons; 174/7 (20 overs)
Asghar Afghan 92 (48); Fitratullah Khawari 1/24 (3 overs)		Hayatullah 41 (22); Amir Hamza 2/22 (4 overs)

Kabul Eagles won by 35 runs
Alokozay Kabul International Cricket Ground, Kabul
Umpires: Farooq Khan and Bismillah Jan Shinwari
Player of the match: Asghar Afghan (Kabul Eagles)

- Kabul Eagles won the toss and elected to bat.
- Hayatullah (Band-e-Amir Dragons) made his T20 debut.

8 October 2019
09:30
Scorecard

Mis Ainak Knights; 156/8 (20 overs)	v	Boost Defenders; 153/9 (20 overs)
Noor Ali Zadran 37 (30); Waqarullah Ishaq 2/28 (3 overs)		Hashmatullah Shahidi 40 (36); Yamin Ahmadzai 4/33 (4 overs)

Mis Ainak Knights won by 3 runs
Alokozay Kabul International Cricket Ground, Kabul
Umpires: Mehmood Kharotai and Izatullah Safi
Player of the match: Yamin Ahmadzai (Mis Ainak Knights)

- Mis Ainak Knights won the toss and elected to bat.
- Waqarullah Ishaq (Boost Defenders), Noor Ahmad and Shafiqullah Ghafari (Mis Ainak Knights) all made their T20 debuts.

8 October 2019
14:00
Scorecard

Amo Sharks; 162/7 (20 overs)	v	Speen Ghar Tigers; 144 (19.4 overs)
Fazal Zazai 49 (36); Zahir Khan 2/20 (4 overs)		Asif Musazai 50 (42); Shapoor Zadran 2/20 (4 overs)

Amo Sharks won by 18 runs
Alokozay Kabul International Cricket Ground, Kabul
Umpires: Ahmed Shah Durrani and Abdullah Rahimi
Player of the match: Fazal Zazai (Amo Sharks)

- Amo Sharks won the toss and elected to bat.
- Farmanullah, Ibrahim, Ghamai Zadran (Amo Sharks), Asif Musazai and Shamsurrahman (Speen Ghar Tigers) all made their T20 debuts.

9 October 2019
09:30
Scorecard

Mis Ainak Knights; 192/4 (20 overs)	v	Band-e-Amir Dragons; 183/6 (20 overs)
Noor Ali Zadran 70 (40); Mujeeb Ur Rahman 2/41 (4 overs)		Shawkat Zaman 54 (39); Naveen-ul-Haq 2/21 (4 overs)

Mis Ainak Knights won by 9 runs
Alokozay Kabul International Cricket Ground, Kabul
Umpires: Izatullah Safi and Bismillah Jan Shinwari
Player of the match: Noor Ali Zadran (Mis Ainak Knights)

- Mis Ainak Knights won the toss and elected to bat.

9 October 2019
14:00
Scorecard

Kabul Eagles; 129/9 (20 overs)	v	Speen Ghar Tigers; 112 (19.5 overs)
Karim Janat 45 (33); Karim Sadiq 3/29 (4 overs)		Najeeb Tarakai 25 (17); Waqar Salamkheil 3/16 (3.5 overs)

Kabul Eagles won by 17 runs
Alokozay Kabul International Cricket Ground, Kabul
Umpires: Mehmood Kharotai and Muhammad Sabir
Player of the match: Karim Janat (Kabul Eagles)

- Kabul Eagles won the toss and elected to bat.
- Ishaq Zazai (Speen Ghar Tigers) made his T20 debut.

10 October 2019
09:30
Scorecard

Amo Sharks; 120/9 (20 overs)	v	Band-e-Amir Dragons; 124/3 (17.1 overs)
Ibrahim Zadran 62 (60); Fareed Ahmad 3/21 (4 overs)		Javed Ahmadi 62* (48); Ibrahim 2/27 (4 overs)

Band-e-Amir Dragons won by 7 wickets
Alokozay Kabul International Cricket Ground, Kabul
Umpires: Ahmed Shah Durrani and Abdullah Rahimi
Player of the match: Javed Ahmadi (Band-e-Amir Dragons)

- Amo Sharks won the toss and elected to bat.
- Naveed Obaid (Band-e-Amir Dragons) made his T20 debut.

10 October 2019
14:00
Scorecard

Kabul Eagles; 144/7 (20 overs)	v	Boost Defenders; 119 (18.1 overs)
Younas Ahmadzai 35 (31); Nasratullah 2/28 (4 overs)		Hashmatullah Shahidi 35 (21); Amir Hamza 2/10 (4 overs)

Kabul Eagles won by 25 runs
Alokozay Kabul International Cricket Ground, Kabul
Umpires: Muhammad Sabir and Bismillah Jan Shinwari
Player of the match: Waqar Salamkheil (Kabul Eagles)

- Kabul Eagles won the toss and elected to bat.
- Bahar Shinwari (Boost Defenders) made his T20 debut.

11 October 2019
09:30
Scorecard

Boost Defenders; 176/5 (20 overs)	v	Amo Sharks; 161/7 (20 overs)
Gulbadin Naib 91 (47); Ziaur Rahman 3/48 (4 overs)		Ibrahim Zadran 35 (25); Gulbadin Naib 3/22 (4 overs)

Boost Defenders won by 15 runs
Alokozay Kabul International Cricket Ground, Kabul
Umpires: Ahmed Shah Durrani and Abdullah Rahimi
Player of the match: Gulbadin Naib (Boost Defenders)

- Boost Defenders won the toss and elected to bat.
- Parvez Amin (Amo Sharks) and Nisar Wahdat (Boost Defenders) both made their T20 debuts.

11 October 2019
14:00
Scorecard

Speen Ghar Tigers; 177/9 (20 overs)	v	Mis Ainak Knights; 173/9 (20 overs)
Najeeb Tarakai 68 (46); Shafiqullah Ghafari 2/33 (4 overs)		Shafiqullah Ghafari 58 (39); Johnathan Campbell 2/21 (3 overs)

Speen Ghar Tigers win by 4 runs
Alokozay Kabul International Cricket Ground, Kabul
Umpires: Farooq Khan and Izatullah Safi
Player of the match: Najeeb Tarakai (Speen Ghar Tigers)

- Speen Ghar Tigers won the toss and elected to bat.
- Nawaz Khan and Bahir Shah (Speen Ghar Tigers) both made their T20 debuts.

12 October 2019
09:30
Scorecard

Amo Sharks; 186/2 (20 overs)	v	Kabul Eagles; 182/9 (20 overs)
Ibrahim Zadran 96* (63); Abdullah Mazari 1/23 (4 overs)		Asghar Afghan 78 (47); Mirwais Ashraf 3/29 (4 overs)

Amo Sharks won by 4 runs
Alokozay Kabul International Cricket Ground, Kabul
Umpires: Mehmood Kharotai and Muhammad Sabir
Player of the match: Ibrahim Zadran (Amo Sharks)

- Kabul Eagles won the toss and elected to field.
- Rahim Mangal (Amo Sharks) and Imran (Kabul Eagles) both made their T20 debuts.
- Ibrahim Zadran (Amo Sharks) took a hat-trick.

12 October 2019
14:00
Scorecard

Band-e-Amir Dragons; 144/8 (20 overs)	v	Speen Ghar Tigers; 129/7 (20 overs)
Afsar Zazai 35 (31); Sayed Shirzad 2/17 (3 overs)		Najeeb Tarakai 41 (30); Mujeeb Ur Rahman 2/12 (4 overs)

Band-e-Amir Dragons won by 15 runs
Alokozay Kabul International Cricket Ground, Kabul
Umpires: Farooq Khan and Mehmood Kharotai
Player of the match: Mujeeb Ur Rahman (Band-e-Amir Dragons)

- Band-e-Amir Dragons won the toss and elected to bat.

13 October 2019
09:30
Scorecard

Kabul Eagles; 131/6 (20 overs)	v	Mis Ainak Knights; 135/1 (18 overs)
Karim Janat 27 (23); Noor Ahmad 3/12 (4 overs)		Noor Ali Zadran 72* (60); Amir Hamza 1/22 (4 overs)

Mis Ainak Knights won by 9 wickets
Alokozay Kabul International Cricket Ground, Kabul
Umpires: Ahmed Shah Durrani and Bismillah Jan Shinwari
Player of the match: Noor Ali Zadran (Mis Ainak Knights)

- Kabul Eagles won the toss and elected to bat.
- Abdul Malik, Abdul Rahman (Kabul Eagles) and Sadiqullah Patan (Mis Ainak Knights) all made their T20 debuts.

13 October 2019
14:00
Scorecard

Boost Defenders; 131/8 (20 overs)	v	Speen Ghar Tigers; 134/4 (11.3 overs)
Brendan Taylor 34 (22); Abdul Wasi 4/13 (4 overs)		Najibullah Zadran 97* (35); Zia-ur-Rehman 2/6 (2 overs)

Speen Ghar Tigers won by 6 wickets
Alokozay Kabul International Cricket Ground, Kabul
Umpires: Farooq Khan and Mehmood Kharotai
Player of the match: Najibullah Zadran (Speen Ghar Tigers)

- Boost Defenders won the toss and elected to bat.
- Tamim Surkhorodi and Abdul Wasi (Speen Ghan Tigers) both made their T20 debuts.

14 October 2019
09:30
Scorecard

Mis Ainak Knights; 162/6 (20 overs)	v	Amo Sharks; 159/5 (20 overs)
Noor Ali Zadran 73 (48); Shapoor Zadran 4/31 (4 overs)		Ibrahim Zadran 69 (53); Yamin Ahmadzai 2/38 (4 overs)

Mis Ainak Knights won by 3 runs
Alokozay Kabul International Cricket Ground, Kabul
Umpires: Ahmed Shah Durrani and Bismillah Jan Shinwari
Player of the match: Noor Ali Zadran (Mis Ainak Knights)

- Mis Ainak Knights won the toss and elected to bat.

14 October 2019
14:00
Scorecard

Band-e-Amir Dragons; 193/4 (20 overs)	v	Boost Defenders; 84 (12.4 overs)
Javed Ahmadi 117* (63); Nasratullah 2/27 (4 overs)		Qais Ahmad 27 (19); Nijat Masood 5/22 (4 overs)

Band-e-Amir Dragons won by 109 runs
Alokozay Kabul International Cricket Ground, Kabul
Umpires: Mehmood Kharotai and Izatullah Safi
Player of the match: Javed Ahmadi (Band-e-Amir Dragons)

- Band-e-Amir Dragons won the toss and elected to bat.
- Rifatullah Shinwari (Band-e-Amir Dragons) and Fazalhaq Farooqi (Boost Defenders) both made their T20 debuts.

== Knockout-stage ==
Qualifier 1
16 October 2019
09:30
Scorecard

Band-e-Amir Dragons; 157/6 (20 overs)	v	Mis Ainak Knights; 162/3 (19.1 overs)
Afsar Zazai 56* (41); Sharafuddin Ashraf 3/15 (4 overs)		Rahmanullah Gurbaz 80 (41); Javed Ahmadi 1/12 (2 overs)

Mis Ainak Knights won by 7 wickets
Alokozay Kabul International Cricket Ground, Kabul
Umpires: Ahmed Shah Durrani and Izatullah Safi
Player of the match: Rahmanullah Gurbaz (Mis Ainak Knights)

- Band-e-Amir Dragons won the toss and elected to bat.

Eliminator
16 October 2019
14:00
Scorecard

Kabul Eagles; 197/3 (20 overs)	v	Speen Ghar Tigers; 181/9 (20 overs)
Karim Janat 120 (63); Zahir Khan 1/24 (4 overs)		Najeeb Tarakai 52 (23); Waqar Salamkheil 4/28 (4 overs)

Kabul Eagles won by 16 runs
Alokozay Kabul International Cricket Ground, Kabul
Umpires: Farooq Khan and Mehmood Kharotai
Player of the match: Karim Janat (Kabul Eagles)

- Kabul Eagles won the toss and elected to bat.

Qualifier 2
17 October 2019
13:15
Scorecard

Band-e-Amir Dragons; 225/2 (20 overs)	v	Kabul Eagles; 222/6 (20 overs)
Imran Janat 115* (64); Yousuf Zazai 1/30 (4 overs)		Younas Ahmadzai 53 (26); Nijat Masood 3/47 (4 overs)

Band-e-Amir Dragons won by 3 runs
Alokozay Kabul International Cricket Ground, Kabul
Umpires: Mehmood Kharotai and Izatullah Safi
Player of the match: Imran Janat (Band-e-Dragons)

- Band-e-Amir Dragons won the toss and elected to bat.

Final
18 October 2019
13:00
Scorecard

Band-e-Amir Dragons; 154/7 (20 overs)	v	Mis Ainak Knights; 155/6 (19.5 overs)
Imran Janat 32 (26); Naveen-ul-Haq 3/41 (4 overs)		Noor Ali Zadran 42 (38); Mujeeb Ur Rahman 2/29 (4 overs)

Mis Ainak Knights won by 4 wickets
Alokozay Kabul International Cricket Ground, Kabul
Umpires: Ahmed Shah Durrani and Izatullah Safi
Player of the match: Sharafuddin Ashraf (Mis Ainak Knights)

- Mis Ainak Knights won the toss and elected to field.
