= 2018 Ghazi Amanullah Khan Regional One Day Tournament =

Cricket tournament

- Dates: 10 July 2018 – 27 July 2018
- Administrator: Afghanistan Cricket Board
- Cricket format: List A
- Tournament format(s): Round-robin, knockout
- Champions: Boost Region (1st title)
- Participants: 6
- Matches: 16
- Player of the series: Sharafuddin Ashraf
- Most runs: Samiullah Shinwari (398)
- Most wickets: Nijat Masood (13)

The 2018 Ghazi Amanullah Khan Regional One Day Tournament was a List A cricket competition that took place in Afghanistan between 10 and 27 July 2018. It was the second edition of the competition to be played with List A status, following the announcements by the International Cricket Council (ICC) in February and May 2017. Six teams competed; Amo Region, Band-e-Amir Region, Boost Region, Kabul Region, Mis Ainak Region and Speen Ghar Region. Speen Ghar Region were the defending champions.

Following the group stage, Speen Ghar Region and Boost Region finished first and second respectively, and faced each other in the final. Boost Region won the match by five wickets to win the tournament.

== Fixtures ==
=== Points table ===
Team	Pld	W	L	T	NRR	Pts
Speen Ghar Region	5	5	0	0	+0.625	10
Boost Region	5	3	2	0	+0.984	6
Band-e-Amir Region	5	3	2	0	+0.944	6
Amo Region	5	2	3	0	–0.903	4
Mis Ainak Region	5	1	4	0	–0.668	2
Kabul Region	5	1	4	0	–0.940	2

Team qualified for the final

=== Group stage ===
10 July 2018
09:30
Scorecard

Amo Region; 272/6 (50 overs)	v	Kabul Region; 274/6 (47.5 overs)
Darwish Rasooli 65 (77); Batin Shah 3/59 (10 overs)		Shafiqullah 50* (24); Sharafuddin Ashraf 2/59 (9 overs)

Kabul Region won by 4 wickets
Kabul International Cricket Stadium, Kabul
Umpires: Bismillah Jan Shinwari and Abdullah
Player of the match: Shafiqullah (Kabul Region)

- Kabul Region won the toss and elected to field.
- Bahar Shinwari, Batin Shah (Kabul Region), Fazal Zazai, Farhan Zakhil, Nisar Wahdat, Haji Murad Muradi, Abdul Wasi, Zohaib Ahmadzai and Fazalhaq Farooqi (Amo Region) all made their List A debuts.

10 July 2018
09:30
Scorecard

Speen Ghar Region; 324 (49.1 overs)	v	Mis Ainak Region; 300 (46 overs)
Mohammad Shahzad 143 (89); Rahmat Shah 4/34 (7 overs)		Shahidullah 103* (90); Qais Ahmad 3/63 (10 overs)

Speen Ghar Region won by 24 runs
Khost Cricket Stadium, Khost
Umpires: Izatullah Safi and Mahmood Kharoti
Player of the match: Mohammad Shahzad (Speen Ghar Region)

- Mis Ainak Region won the toss and elected to field.
- Rahmatullah Sahaq (Mis Ainak Region), Ikram Alikhil, Zahidullah and Qais Ahmad (Speen Ghar Region) all made their List A debuts.

11 July 2018
09:30
Scorecard

Amo Region; 152 (42.4 overs)	v	Band-e-Amir Region; 153/1 (16 overs)
Javed Ahmadi 37 (28); Nijat Masood 5/19 (7 overs)		Hazratullah Zazai 103* (50); Fazalhaq Farooqi 1/26 (3 overs)

Band-e-Amir Region won by 9 wickets
Kabul International Cricket Stadium, Kabul
Umpires: Ahmed Shah Durrani and Farooq Khan
Player of the match: Nijat Masood (Band-e-Amir Region)

- Band-e-Amir Region won the toss and elected to field.

11 July 2018
09:30
Scorecard

Speen Ghar Region; 298/8 (50 overs)	v	Boost Region; 241/9 (50 overs)
Samiullah Shinwari 104 (144); Sayed Shirzad 2/39 (10 overs)		Munir Ahmad 81 (78); Aftab Alam 3/48 (10 overs)

Speen Ghar Region won by 57 runs
Khost Cricket Stadium, Khost
Umpires: Mahmood Kharoti and Ajmal Shamolzi
Player of the match: Samiullah Shinwari (Speen Ghar Region)

- Boost Region won the toss and elected to field.
- Bahir Shah (Speen Ghar Region), Sayed Shirzad and Mohammad Alam (Boost Region) all made their List A debuts.

13 July 2018
09:30
Scorecard

Band-e-Amir Region; 310/5 (50 overs)	v	Kabul Region; 247/9 (50 overs)
Usman Ghani 136 (118); Karim Janat 2/65 (10 overs)		Imran Janat 57 (71); Hashmatullah Shahidi 3/39 (8 overs)

Band-e-Amir Region won by 63 runs
Kabul International Cricket Stadium, Kabul
Umpires: Bismillah Jan Shinwari and Abdullah
Player of the match: Usman Ghani (Band-e-Amir Region)

- Kabul Region won the toss and elected to field.

13 July 2018
09:30
Scorecard

Mis Ainak Region; 227/9 (46 overs)	v	Boost Region; 203/9 (34.5 overs)
Shahidullah 51 (63); Sayed Shirzad 2/35 (8 overs)		Waqarullah Ishaq 52 (46); Nawaz Khan 3/38 (6 overs)

Boost Region won by 1 wicket (D/L method)
Khost Cricket Stadium, Khost
Umpires: Izatullah Safi and Muhammad Sabir
Player of the match: Waqarullah Ishaq (Boost Region)

- Boost Region won the toss and elected to field.
- Abdul Baqi (Boost Region), Naveed Obaid, Asadullah and Nasir Totakhil (Mis Ainak Region) all made their List A debuts.

15 July 2018
09:30
Scorecard

Speen Ghar Region; 321/8 (50 overs)	v	Kabul Region; 257 (47.4 overs)
Mohammad Shahzad 109 (80); Abdullah Mazari 4/45 (10 overs)		Shafiqullah 55 (36); Aftab Alam 3/37 (8.4 overs)

Speen Ghar Region won by 64 runs
Kabul International Cricket Stadium, Kabul
Umpires: Mehmood Kharotai and Bismillah Jan Shinwari
Player of the match: Mohammad Shahzad (Speen Ghar Region)

- Speen Ghar Region won the toss and elected to bat.
- Javed Zadran, Mohammad Inamullah and Qasim Oryakhail (Kabul Region) all made their List A debuts.

16 July 2018
09:30
Scorecard

Mis Ainak Region; 160 (37.1 overs)	v	Band-e-Amir Region; 162/4 (29 overs)
Rahmat Shah 29 (31); Amir Hamza 2/20 (6.1 overs)		Ihsanullah 66* (82); Rahmat Shah 2/32 (9 overs)

Band-e-Amir Region won by 6 wickets
Kabul International Cricket Stadium, Kabul
Umpires: Abdullah and Izatullah Safi
Player of the match: Ihsanullah (Band-e-Amir Region)

- Mis Ainak Region won the toss and elected to bat.

18 July 2018
09:30
Scorecard

Amo Region; 318/4 (50 overs)	v	Boost Region; 316/9 (50 overs)
Javed Ahmadi 123 (118); Yamin Ahmadzai 2/76 (10 overs)		Karim Sadiq 75 (36); Sharafuddin Ashraf 6/43 (10 overs)

Amo Region won by 2 runs
Kabul International Cricket Stadium, Kabul
Umpires: Farooq Khan and Ahmed Shah Durrani
Player of the match: Sharafuddin Ashraf (Amo Region)

- Boost Region won the toss and elected to field.
- Riaz Hassan (Amo Region) and Zahid Zakhail (Boost Region) both made their List A debuts.

19 July 2018
09:30
Scorecard

Kabul Region; 304/9 (50 overs)	v	Mis Ainak Region; 307/8 (48.4 overs)
Shafiqullah 77 (40); Zahir Khan 4/63 (10 overs)		Noor Ali Zadran 74* (73); Naveen-ul-Haq 3/49 (9.4 overs)

Mis Ainak Region won by 2 wickets
Kabul International Cricket Stadium, Kabul
Umpires: Mehmood Kharotai and Bismillah Jan Shinwari
Player of the match: Rahmanullah Gurbaz (Mis Ainak Region)

- Kabul Region won the toss and elected to bat.
- Said Mutabar and Shamsurrahman (Kabul Region) both made their List A debuts.

20 July 2018
09:30
Scorecard

Band-e-Amir Region; 266/7 (50 overs)	v	Speen Ghar Region; 269/6 (49.1 overs)
Ibrahim Zadran 100 (123); Aftab Alam 3/60 (10 overs)		Mohammad Shahzad 66 (73); Nijat Masood 2/70 (9.1 overs)

Speen Ghar Region won by 4 wickets
Kabul International Cricket Stadium, Kabul
Umpires: Abdullah and Izatullah Safi
Player of the match: Tahir Khan (Speen Ghar Region)

- Speen Ghar Region won the toss and elected to field.

22 July 2018
09:30
Scorecard

Kabul Region; 216/8 (50 overs)	v	Boost Region; 218/3 (32.3 overs)
Shawkat Zaman 50 (74); Rokhan Barakzai 3/31 (10 overs)		Najibullah Zadran 58* (24); Javed Zadran 1/29 (4 overs)

Boost Region won by 7 wickets
Kabul International Cricket Stadium, Kabul
Umpires: Ahmed Shah Pakteen and Mehmood Kharotai
Player of the match: Karim Sadiq (Boost Region)

- Boost Region won the toss and elected to field.
- Dastagir Khan (Boost Region) made his List A debut.

23 July 2018
09:30
Scorecard

Amo Region; 301 (50 overs)	v	Mis Ainak Region; 289/9 (50 overs)
Mirwais Ashraf 55 (35); Zia-ur-Rehman 2/38 (9 overs)		Rahmat Shah 109 (113); Sharafuddin Ashraf 3/52 (10 overs)

Amo-Region won by 12 runs
Kabul International Cricket Stadium, Kabul
Umpires: Bismillah Jan Shinwari and Izatullah Safi
Player of the match: Sharafuddin Ashraf (Amo Region)

- Mis Ainak Region won the toss and elected to field.
- Fareed Zargar (Mis Ainak Region) and Jamshid Khan (Amo Region) both made their List A debuts.

24 July 2018
09:30
Scorecard

Band-e-Amir Region; 208/9 (50 overs)	v	Boost Region; 212/8 (22.3 overs)
Hashmatullah Shahidi 58 (86); Sayed Shirzad 2/35 (10 overs); Abdul Baqi 2/35 (10 overs)		Najibullah Zadran 95* (51); Sayed Nasratullah 3/43 (6 overs)

Boost Region won by 2 wickets
Kabul International Cricket Stadium, Kabul
Umpires: Ahmed Shah Durrani and Farooq Khan
Player of the match: Najibullah Zadran (Boost Region)

- Boost Region won the toss and elected to field.
- Farmanullah (Band-e-Amir Region) made his List A debut.

25 July 2018
09:30
Scorecard

Amo Region; 346/7 (50 overs)	v	Speen Ghar Region; 347/5 (49.4 overs)
Nisar Wahdat 101 (103); Wafadar 3/89 (10 overs)		Samiullah Shinwari 192* (123); Mirwais Ashraf 2/55 (6 overs)

Speen Ghar Region won by 5 wickets
Kabul International Cricket Stadium, Kabul
Umpires: Ahmed Shah Durrani and Mehmood Kharotai
Player of the match: Samiullah Shinwari (Speen Ghar Region)

- Speen Ghar Region won the toss and elected to field.
- Samiullah (Amo Region), Mohammad Ishaq, Naqib Nangarhari and Tamim Surkhorodi (Speen Ghar Region) all made their List A debuts.

== Final ==
27 July 2018
09:30
Scorecard

Speen Ghar Region; 319/8 (50 overs)	v	Boost Region; 325/5 (48.3 overs)
Azmatullah Omarzai 66 (45); Sayed Shirzad 3/72 (10 overs)		Munir Ahmad 108* (91); Tariq Stanikzai 1/44 (8 overs)

Boost Region won by 5 wickets
Kabul International Cricket Stadium, Kabul
Umpires: Ahmed Shah Pakteen and Farooq Khan
Player of the match: Munir Ahmad (Boost Region)

- Boost Region won the toss and elected to field.
