= Fazalhaq Farooqi =

Afghan cricketer (born 2000)

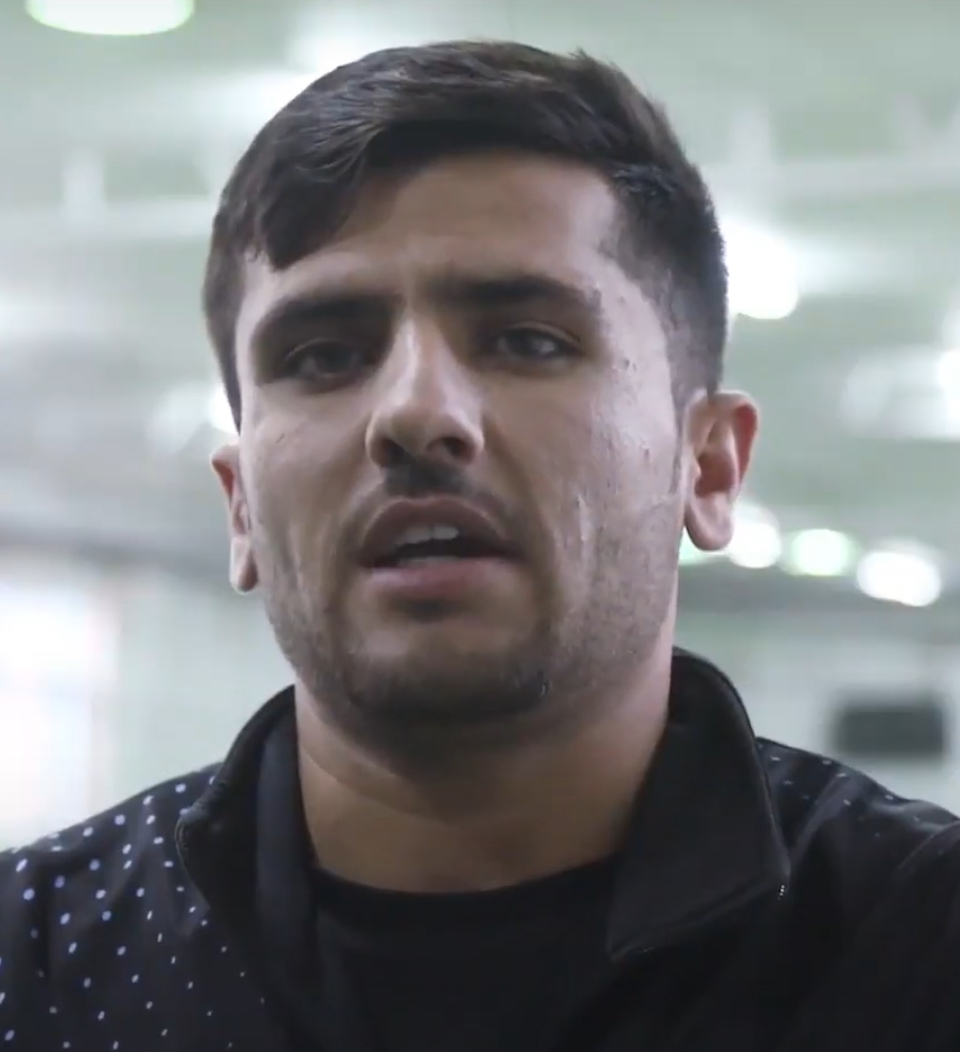
- Farooqi in 2021

Personal information
- Born: 22 September 2000 (age 26); Baghlan, Afghanistan
- Batting: Right-handed
- Bowling: Left-arm fast
- Role: Bowler

International information
- National side: Afghanistan (2021–present)
- ODI debut (cap 52): 25 January 2022 v Netherlands
- Last ODI: 28 February 2025 v Australia
- ODI shirt no.: 5
- T20I debut (cap 43): 20 March 2021 v Zimbabwe
- Last T20I: 14 December 2024 v Zimbabwe
- T20I shirt no.: 5

Domestic team information
- Years: Team
- 2022: Minister Dhaka
- 2022–2023: Sunrisers Hyderabad
- 2022/23: Sydney Thunder
- 2023/2024: Islamabad United
- 2024: Nottinghamshire
- 2024: Manchester Originals
- 2025: Rajasthan Royals
- 2025: St Kitts and Nevis Patriots
- 2026: Glamorgan

Career statistics
Competition	ODI	T20I	LA	T20
Matches	42	54	51	159
Runs scored	21	17	35	52
Batting average	3.50	4.25	3.88	5.77
100s/50s	0/0	0/0	0/0	0/0
Top score	6*	4*	7	16*
Balls bowled	1,776	1,137	2,223	3,403
Wickets	52	66	62	200
Bowling average	33.50	20.16	35.06	21.40
5 wickets in innings	0	1	0	4
10 wickets in match	0	0	0	0
Best bowling	4/34	5/9	4/34	5/9
Catches/stumpings	3/–	7/–	3/–	25/–
- Source: ESPNcricinfo, 6 July 2026

Fazalhaq Farooqi (Pashto: فضل الحق فاروقي) (born 22 September 2000) is an Afghan international cricketer who plays for the national team in limited-overs cricket. Farooqi made his international debut for the Afghanistan cricket team in March 2021. In franchise leagues, he has played for Rajasthan Royals in the Indian Premier League (IPL) and Dhaka Dominators in the Bangladesh Premier League (BPL).

== Career ==
Fazalhaq made his first-class debut for Amo Region in the 2017–18 Ahmad Shah Abdali 4-day Tournament on 13 November 2017. He made his List A debut for Amo Region in the 2018 Ghazi Amanullah Khan Regional One Day Tournament on 10 July 2018.

In September 2018, he was named in Nangarhar's squad in the first edition of the Afghanistan Premier League tournament. In December 2018, he was named in Afghanistan's under-23 team for the 2018 ACC Emerging Teams Asia Cup. He made his Twenty20 debut on 14 October 2019, for Boost Defenders in the 2019 Shpageeza Cricket League.

In December 2019, he was named in Afghanistan's squad for the 2020 Under-19 Cricket World Cup. In February 2021, he was named in Afghanistan's Test squad for their series against Zimbabwe. The following month, he was named in Afghanistan's Twenty20 International (T20I) squad, also for their series against Zimbabwe. He made his T20I debut for Afghanistan, against Zimbabwe, on 20 March 2021. Later the same month, Chennai Super Kings included Fazalhaq as a net bowler in their squad for the 2021 IPL edition. Farooqi also served as Kings XI Punjab's net bowler in the 2020 edition of the Indian Premier League.

In July 2021, Fazalhaq was named in Afghanistan's One Day International (ODI) squad for their series against Pakistan. In January 2022, he was named in Afghanistan's ODI squad for their series against the Netherlands in Qatar. He made his ODI debut on 25 January 2022, against the Netherlands.

In February 2022, he was bought by the Sunrisers Hyderabad in the auction for the 2022 Indian Premier League tournament. In July 2022, he was signed by the Colombo Stars for the third edition of the Lanka Premier League. On 23 December 2022, the Sydney Thunder terminated his contract following an investigation by Cricket Australia into a behavioral incident involving Fazal Haq, which occurred on 15 December 2022 and involved alleged harassment of female cricketing staff. The matter was not reported to the police and details of the alleged behaviour were not revealed due to confidentiality clauses around those involved.

In 2024, he was named part of Afghanistan's 2024 ICC Men's T20 World Cup squad. As of their match against Bangladesh, he had the most amount wickets at 16, just edging out India's Arshdeep Singh and his own teammate Rashid Khan. In Afghanistan's first match against Uganda, he was named Player of the Match. He took 5 wickets, at the economy of just 2.25, spearheading Afghanistan's bowling attack. In Afghanistan's second match against New Zealand, he took 4 wickets, most notably bowling out Finn Allen in the first ball of the innings, at the economy rate of just 5.10. In Afghanistan's third match against Papua New Guinea, he was once more named POTM, taking 3 wickets at the economy rate of just 4.00. His performance in Afghanistan's last match of the group stage against West Indies, was his worst. He took no wickets, at the costly economy rate of 12.66. In Afghanistan's first match of the Super 8, against India, he took 3 wickets at the economy rate of 8.25. In Afghanistan's second match of the Super 8, against Australia, he took no wickets at the economy rate of 7. In Afghanistan's match against Bangladesh, he took 1 wicket at the economy rate of 7.50.

Farooqi signed to play in the English T20 Blast for Nottinghamshire in 2024.
