= Fazal Zazai =

Afghan cricketer (born 1992)

Personal information
- Full name: Fazal Rahman Zazai
- Born: 15 August 1992 (age 34); Paktia, Afghanistan
- Batting: Right-handed
- Bowling: Right-arm off-break
- Source: Cricinfo, 14 September 2017

Fazal Zazai (born 15 August 1992) is an Afghan cricketer. He made his Twenty20 debut for Amo Sharks in the 2017 Shpageeza Cricket League on 14 September 2017. He made his first-class debut for Mis Ainak Region in the 2017–18 Ahmad Shah Abdali 4-day Tournament on 20 October 2017. In the second innings of the final of the 2018 Ahmad Shah Abdali 4-day Tournament, he scored 155 runs for Amo Region.

He made his List A debut for Amo Region in the 2018 Ghazi Amanullah Khan Regional One Day Tournament on 10 July 2018.

In September 2018, he was named in Paktia's squad in the first edition of the Afghanistan Premier League tournament.
