= Tariq Stanikzai =

Afghan cricketer (born 1999)

Personal information
- Born: 13 December 1999 (age 26); Nangarhar, Afghanistan
- Batting: Left-handed
- Bowling: Left-arm Orthodox
- Source: Cricinfo, 13 August 2017

Tariq Stanikzai (born 13 December 1999) is an Afghan cricketer. He made his List A debut for Boost Region in the 2017 Ghazi Amanullah Khan Regional One Day Tournament on 13 August 2017. Prior to his List A debut, he was part of Afghanistan's squad for the 2016 Under-19 Cricket World Cup. He made his Twenty20 debut for Boost Defenders in the 2017 Shpageeza Cricket League on 11 September 2017.

== Career ==
Stanikzai was a member of Afghanistan's 2018 Under-19 Cricket World Cup squad.

He made his first-class debut for Speen Ghar Region in the 2018 Ahmad Shah Abdali 4-day Tournament on 1 March 2018.

In September 2018, he was named in Balkh's squad in the first edition of the Afghanistan Premier League tournament. In November 2019, he was named in Afghanistan's squad for the 2019 ACC Emerging Teams Asia Cup in Bangladesh.
