= Samiullah (Afghan cricketer) =

Afghan cricketer (born 2003)

Samiullah Salarzai Sharifi
Personal information
- Full name: Samiullah Salarzai Sharifi
- Born: 23 December 2003 (age 22); Kunduz, Afghanistan
- Nickname: Sharifi
- Batting: Right-handed
- Bowling: Right-arm fast-medium
- Role: All-rounder

Domestic team information
- Years: Team
- 2017: Amo Sharks
- Source: Cricinfo, 20 October 2017

Samiullah Salarzai (born 23 December 2003) is an Afghan cricketer. He made his first-class debut for Amo Sharks in the 2017–18 Ahmad Shah Abdali 4-day Tournament on 20 October 2017. He made his List A debut for Amo Region in the 2018 Ghazi Amanullah Khan Regional One Day Tournament on 25 July 2018.

In September 2018, he was named in Balkh's squad in the first edition of the Afghanistan Premier League tournament. He made his Twenty20 debut for Balkh Legends in the 2018–19 Afghanistan Premier League on 18 October 2018.
