= Haji Murad Muradi =

Afghan cricketer (born 1989)

Personal information
- Full name: Haji Murad Muradi
- Born: 29 May 1989 (age 37); Faryab Province, Afghanistan
- Batting: Right-handed
- Role: Wicket-keeper

Domestic team information
- Years: Team
- 2017–2018: Amo Region

Career statistics
Competition	FC	LA	T20
Matches	27	20	10
Runs scored	1,585	373	93
Batting average	39.62	28.69	15.50
100s/50s	2/13	0/2	0/0
Top score	142	97	26
Balls bowled	54	–	–
Wickets	1	–	–
Bowling average	48.00	–	–
5 wickets in innings	0	–	–
10 wickets in match	0	–	–
Best bowling	1/29	–	–
Catches/stumpings	60/13	15/2	3/0
- Source: ESPNcricinfo, 11 May 2025

Haji Murad Muradi (born 29 May 1989) is an Afghan cricketer. He made his Twenty20 debut for Speen Ghar Tigers in the 2017 Shpageeza Cricket League on 17 September 2017. He made his first-class debut for Amo Region in the 2017–18 Ahmad Shah Abdali 4-day Tournament on 20 October 2017, scoring a century in both innings, albeit in a losing cause. He captained Amo Region in the final of the 2018 Ahmad Shah Abdali 4-day Tournament.

He made his List A debut for Amo Region in the 2018 Ghazi Amanullah Khan Regional One Day Tournament on 10 July 2018.
