= Mohammad Alam (Afghan cricketer) =

Afghan cricketer (born 1996)

Personal information
- Full name: Mohammad Alam
- Born: 29 March 1996 (age 30); Ghazni, Afghanistan
- Source: Cricinfo, 26 October 2017

Mohammad Alam (born 29 March 1996) is an Afghan cricketer. He made his first-class debut for Boost Region in the 2017–18 Ahmad Shah Abdali 4-day Tournament on 26 October 2017. In the second innings he took seven wickets for 76 runs and was named man of the match.

He made his List A debut for Boost Region in the 2018 Ghazi Amanullah Khan Regional One Day Tournament on 11 July 2018. In the qualifier match for the final of the tournament, he took six wickets for 31 runs against Amo Region, to help Boost Region progress to the final.
