= Abdul Wasi =

Afghan cricketer (born 2002)

Personal information
- Full name: Abdul Wasi Noori
- Born: 6 July 2002 (age 24)
- Batting: Right-handed
- Bowling: Legbreak
- Role: Batter

International information
- National side: Afghanistan
- Only Test (cap 21): 2 March 2021 v Zimbabwe

Domestic team information
- Years: Team
- 2017–present: Amo Region

Career statistics
Competition	Test	FC	LA	T20
Matches	1	21	22	12
Runs scored	12	1,034	145	139
Batting average	6.00	36.92	20.71	23.16
100s/50s	0/0	1/7	0/1	0/0
Top score	9	142	52*	36*
Balls bowled	53	4,122	843	232
Wickets	0	82	24	16
Bowling average	–	30.51	29.50	19.18
5 wickets in innings	–	4	1	0
10 wickets in match	–	1	0	0
Best bowling	–	6/91	5/54	4/13
Catches/stumpings	0/–	6/–	6/–	0/–
- Source: ESPNcricinfo, 19 July 2026

Abdul Wasi (born 6 July 2002) is an Afghan cricketer. He made his international debut for the Afghanistan cricket team in March 2021.

== Career ==
He made his first-class debut for Amo Region in the 2018 Ahmad Shah Abdali 4-day Tournament on 1 March 2018 and was named the man of the match. He was the leading wicket-taker for Amo Region in the tournament, with 54 dismissals in ten matches, and he was also named as the player of the series.

He made his List A debut for Amo Region in the 2018 Ghazi Amanullah Khan Regional One Day Tournament on 10 July 2018. He made his Twenty20 debut on 13 October 2019, for Speen Ghar Tigers in the 2019 Shpageeza Cricket League.

In November 2019, he was named in Afghanistan's squad for the 2019 ACC Emerging Teams Asia Cup in Bangladesh. In February 2021, he was named as a reserve player in Afghanistan's Test squad for their series against Zimbabwe. He made his Test debut for Afghanistan, against Zimbabwe, on 2 March 2021.
