= Qais Ahmad =

Afghan cricketer (born 2000)

Personal information
- Full name: Qais Ahmad Kamawal
- Born: 15 August 2000 (age 26); Nangarhar, Afghanistan
- Batting: Right-handed
- Bowling: Right-arm leg spin
- Role: Bowler

International information
- National side: Afghanistan
- Test debut (cap 16): 5 September 2019 v Bangladesh
- Last Test: 2 February 2024 v Sri Lanka
- ODI debut (cap 53): 25 January 2022 v Netherlands
- Last ODI: 14 February 2024 v Sri Lanka
- T20I debut (cap 42): 10 March 2020 v Ireland
- Last T20I: 11 November 2025 v Qatar

Domestic team information
- Years: Team
- 2017: Kabul Eagles
- 2018–: Speen Ghar Region
- 2018: St Lucia Stars
- 2018: Balkh Legends
- 2019: Rajshahi Kings
- 2018/19–2019/20: Hobart Hurricanes
- 2019: Guyana Amazon Warriors
- 2019: Boost Defenders
- 2020: Colombo Kings
- 2021: Quetta Gladiators
- 2021–2022: Kent
- 2021: Welsh Fire
- 2021/22: Melbourne Stars
- 2022: Minister Dhaka
- 2023: San Francisco Unicorns

Career statistics
Competition	Test	ODI	T20I	FC
Matches	2	3	12	17
Runs scored	45	12	33	431
Batting average	11.25	6.00	6.60	18.73
100s/50s	0/0	0/0	0/0	1/0
Top score	21	11	18	110
Balls bowled	188	130	210	3,411
Wickets	3	6	17	89
Bowling average	44.66	22.16	14.17	21.86
5 wickets in innings	0	0	0	5
10 wickets in match	0	0	0	3
Best bowling	2/98	3/32	3/16	7/41
Catches/stumpings	0/–	0/–	8/–	10/–
Medal record
Representing Afghanistan
Men's Cricket
Asian Games
Silver medal – second place	2022 Hangzhou	Team
- Source: Cricinfo, 19 July 2026

Qais Ahmad Kamawal (Pashto: قیص احمد; born 15 August 2000) is an Afghan cricketer. He made his Test debut for the Afghanistan cricket team in September 2019.

== Domestic career ==
Qais Ahmad made his senior cricket debut for Kabul Eagles in the 2017 Shpageeza Cricket League in September 2017, before going on to make his first-class cricket debut for Speen Ghar Region in the 2018 Ahmad Shah Abdali 4-day Tournament in March the following year. He took ten wickets in the game (6/98 & 4/42) and was named the player of the match, going on to be the leading wicket-taker for Speen Ghar Region during the tournament, with 41 dismissals in eight matches. His List A debut followed in July 2018 for Speen Ghar Region in the 2018 Ghazi Amanullah Khan Regional One Day Tournament.

In May 2021, he signed to play for Kent County Cricket Club in the 2021 T20 Blast. In December 2021, he re-signed for Kent for the county's 2022 T20 Blast campaign.

== T20 franchise career ==
Ahead of the 2018 Caribbean Premier League, during which he played for St Lucia Stars, Qais was named as one of five players to watch in the tournament. In September 2018, he was named in Balkh Legends squad in the first edition of the Afghanistan Premier League tournament. In the final of the tournament, he took a five-wicket haul, and was named the player of the match, with Balkh winning the title. He was also the leading wicket-taker for the team in the tournament, with 15 dismissals in nine matches.

He played in the 2018–19 Bangladesh Premier League for Rajshahi Kings, and in February 2019 was signed by the Hobart Hurricanes for the remainder of the 2018–19 Big Bash League season, as a replacement for the injured Tymal Mills. He also appeared for the team in the following season's competition before playing for Guyana Amazon Warriors in the 2020 Caribbean Premier League. In October 2020, he was drafted by the Colombo Kings for the inaugural edition of the Lanka Premier League.

== International career ==
He was a member of Afghanistan's squad for the 2018 Under-19 Cricket World Cup, and went on to be the team's leading wicket-taker in the tournament, with 14 wickets. Following Afghanistan's matches in the tournament, the International Cricket Council (ICC) named Ahmad as the rising star of the squad. In December 2018, he was named in Afghanistan's under-23 team for the 2018 ACC Emerging Teams Asia Cup, before being named in the Test squad for their one-off match against Bangladesh. He made his Test debut in the match in September 2019.

In February 2020, Qais was named in Afghanistan's Twenty20 International (T20I) squad for their series against Ireland. He made his T20I debut during the series, playing in the final match on 10 March 2020.

In July 2021, he was named as one of four reserve players in Afghanistan's One Day International (ODI) squad for their series against Pakistan. In September 2021, he was named in Afghanistan's squad for the 2021 ICC Men's T20 World Cup. In January 2022, he was named in Afghanistan's ODI squad for their "home series" against the Netherlands in Qatar. He made his ODI debut on 25 January 2022, against the Netherlands.
