= Mohammad Sabir (cricketer, born 2001) =

Afghan cricketer (born 2001)

Personal information
- Born: 5 May 2001 (age 25)
- Source: Cricinfo, 4 April 2018

Mohammad Sabir (born 5 May 2001) is an Afghan cricketer. He made his first-class debut for Boost Region in the 2018 Ahmad Shah Abdali 4-day Tournament on 1 April 2018.
