= Ahmad Zahir (cricketer) =

Afghan cricketer (born 2001)

Personal information
- Born: 25 March 2001 (age 25)
- Source: Cricinfo, 1 August 2019

Ahmad Zahir (born 25 March 2001) is an Afghan cricketer. He made his first-class debut for Boost Region in the Ahmad Shah Abdali 4-day Tournament on 13 March 2018. He made his List A debut for Kandahar Province in the Afghanistan Provincial Challenge Cup tournament on 1 August 2019.
