= Rifatullah Shinwari =

Afghan cricketer (born 1994)

Personal information
- Born: 22 December 1994 (age 31)
- Source: Cricinfo, 16 October 2019

Rifatullah Shinwari (born 22 December 1994) is an Afghan cricketer. He made his List A debut for Boost Region in the 2019 Ghazi Amanullah Khan Regional One Day Tournament on 16 September 2019. He made his Twenty20 debut for Band-e-Amir Dragons in the 2019 Shpageeza Cricket League on 14 October 2019.
