= Mohammad Shahzad =

Afghan cricketer (born 1988)

Personal information
- Full name: Mohammad Shahzad Mohammadi
- Born: 10 January 1988 (age 38); Nangarhar Province, Afghanistan
- Height: 5 ft 3 in (1.60 m)
- Batting: Right-handed
- Role: Wicket-keeper-batsman

International information
- National side: Afghanistan (2009-2023)
- Test debut (cap 6): 14 June 2018 v India
- Last Test: 15 March 2019 v Ireland
- ODI debut (cap 14): 30 August 2009 v Netherlands
- Last ODI: 4 June 2019 v Sri Lanka
- ODI shirt no.: 77
- T20I debut (cap 6): 1 February 2010 v Ireland
- Last T20I: 7 October 2023 v India
- T20I shirt no.: 77

Domestic team information
- Years: Team
- 2014: Boost Defenders
- 2015: Band-e-Amir Dragons
- 2015–2016: Kabul Eagles
- 2018: Speen Ghar Tigers
- 2016: Rangpur Riders
- 2018–2019: Chittagong Vikings
- 2018: Paktia Panthers
- 2020: Rangpur Riders
- 2021: Chitwan Tigers
- 2018: Rajputs
- 2019: Deccan Gladiators
- 2022: Minister Dhaka

Career statistics
Competition	Test	ODI	T20I	FC
Matches	2	84	73	31
Runs scored	69	2,727	2,048	2,224
Batting average	17.25	33.66	29.25	45.38
100s/50s	0/0	6/14	1/12	6/12
Top score	40	131*	118*	214*
Catches/stumpings	0/0	64/25	33/28	64/9
Medal record
Representing Afghanistan
Men's Cricket
Asian Games
Silver medal – second place	2010 Guangzhou	Team
Silver medal – second place	2014 Incheon	Team
Silver medal – second place	2022 Hangzhou	Team
- Source: ESPNcricinfo, 1 February 2026

Mohammad Shahzad Mohammadi (Pashto: محمد شهزاد محمدي; born 10 January 1988) is an Afghan cricketer who has represented his country in all three international formats. He is a right-handed opening batsman and a wicketkeeper. He made his international debut for Afghanistan in August 2009 against the Netherlands.

Shahzad was one of the eleven cricketers to play in Afghanistan's first Test match, against India, in June 2018. Shahzad also has a rare record - scoring an ODI hundred in the lowest team score - by reaching an ODI century at a point when Afghanistan's score (against India in the Asia Cup 2018) was just 131, thus equalling Pakistan's Shahid Afridi's previous record.

== Early life and family ==
Shahzad was born in a refugee camp in Peshawar, Pakistan. He spent most of his early life in Peshawar, where he also got married. As of 2018, he was still living there as a temporary resident, which led the Afghanistan Cricket Board to request that he relocate to Afghanistan.

== International cricket ==
Shahzad was not part of Afghanistan's squad when they began to rise through international cricket tournaments in 2008, joining for the 2009 Cricket World Cup Qualifier in South Africa. His strong performances in the tournament helped Afghanistan obtain One Day International status and he has been a regular part of their national team in all three formats of the game since then.

=== First-class cricket ===
==== 2009–2010 ====
Shahzad first played first-class cricket for Afghanistan in the 2009–10 ICC Intercontinental Cup, the highest level of international cricket below Test cricket.

In August 2009, Shahzad made his first-class debut against a Zimbabwe XI at Mutare Sports Club, scoring 79 in his first ever first-class innings. He played a key role in Afghanistan's win over Ireland, with scores of 88 and 42 not out, and in February 2010, he became the first Afghan to score a first-class double century when he scored 214 not out in Afghanistan's successful chase of 494 runs to beat Canada. His other century for the tournament came in August 2010 against Scotland. He scored 54 in the first innings as Afghanistan put on 435 runs, then scored rapidly in the second innings as Afghanistan asserted their dominance on the game. Afghanistan did not declare until Shahzad reached his century, and he did so by hitting Moneeb Iqbal for six runs.

Shahzad scored a half-century in the Intercontinental Cup final against Scotland to give Afghanistan the title in their first year of participation. He finished the tournament as the top run-scorer for both Afghanistan and the whole competition, with 802 runs at an average of 80.20, including two centuries and five half-centuries. He was also the leading wicket-keeper, with 28 dismissals behind the wickets, including 25 catches and 3 stumpings. As a result, he was one of four players from Afghanistan named in the team of the tournament.

==== 2011–2017 ====
Shahzad scored a half-century in Afghanistan's opening match of the 2011–13 ICC Intercontinental Cup against Canada, but otherwise failed to have a major impact on the tournament. He never again scored above 50 and finished with an average of just 23.81, though at the end of the tournament, he was named the team's new vice-captain. In January 2012, Shahzad played in a side made up of some of the leading players from Associate and Affiliate teams called the ICC Combined Associate and Affiliate XI, which was put together to face England in Dubai. The three-day match was part of England's preparation for a series against Pakistan later that month. Along with Mohammad Nabi and Hameed Hasan, Shahzad was one of three Afghanistan players included in the 12-man squad. During the match, he scored two half-centuries, and he was named the player of the match despite his team losing.

Shahzad bounced back in the 2015–17 ICC Intercontinental Cup and scored his third and fourth first-class centuries against Papua New Guinea and Namibia respectively. The century against Papua New Guinea saw Afghanistan overcome a 151-run first innings deficit to win by 201 runs, and the century against Namibia, for which Shahzad was named the player of the match, helped Afghanistan to an innings victory. This was Afghanistan's final involvement in the Intercontinental Cup, as in 2017, they were granted full member status by the International Cricket Council and were automatically given Test status.

=== Test cricket ===
In May 2018, Shahzad was named in Afghanistan's squad for their inaugural Test match played against India. He made his Test debut for Afghanistan, against India, on 14 June 2018. Muhammad Shahzad opened the batting for Afghanistan and scored 14 and 13 runs in the two innings, respectively. Afghanistan lost the one-sided Test within two days. In February 2019, he was named in Afghanistan's Test squad for their one-off match against Ireland in India.

=== One-day cricket ===
Shahzad played in the 2009 ICC World Cup Qualifiers, where Afghanistan gained ODI status after a win over Namibia in which Shahzad scored a decisive 73 runs.

Shahzad made his ODI debut during Afghanistan's tour to the Netherlands on 30 August 2009 at VRA Cricket Ground. In the second match of the series, he made Afghan cricketing history by becoming the first Afghan to score a century in a One Day International match, scoring 110 runs as Afghanistan won the match by 6 wickets.

Shahzad was a member of Afghanistan's 2010 ACC Trophy Elite winning squad, which defeated Nepal in the final by 95 runs.

In July 2010, Shahzad was part of Afghanistan's team in the 2010 ICC World Cricket League Division One tournament, and he scored two half-centuries (both against the Netherlands) to help Afghanistan finish 3rd in the tournament, and another century in the first ODI of the series.

In August 2013, in a series against Namibia, Shahzad scored a century and a half-century in two wins.

=== T20I cricket ===
In February 2010, Shahzad made his Twenty20 International debut against Ireland as part of a tri-series in the lead-up to the 2010 World Twenty20 Qualifier. Shahzad was then a key member of Afghanistan's squad for the World Twenty20 Qualifier, as he scored 65 in Afghanistan's successful run chase in the tournament final against Ireland. He was later named in Afghanistan's squad for the World Twenty20.

In the 2012 ICC World Twenty20 Qualifier, Shahzad scored three half-centuries, including one in the tournament final against Ireland. Afghanistan lost the match but qualified for the 2012 ICC World Twenty20 regardless. During the World Twenty20, he played in both of Afghanistan's matches against India and South Africa.

In a two-match Twenty20 series against Scotland in March 2013, Shahzad made scores of 55 and 46 and was named the player of the match in both games. Shahzad then played in both the 2013 ICC World Twenty20 Qualifier and the 2014 ICC World Twenty20. He went into the World Twenty20 in poor form, making consecutive scores of 7, 22, 0, 22 and 0, but he broke this form slump in Afghanistan's match against Hong Kong, when he scored 68 runs from 53 balls in a seven-wicket win.

Shahzad played two explosive innings in the 2015 ICC World Twenty20 Qualifier, making scores of 74 against the United Arab Emirates and 75 against Scotland. His innings against Scotland was part of Afghanistan's highest ever score to that point (210) and his partnership with Asghar Afghan reached 110 runs in 63 balls, the biggest partnership for Afghanistan in Twenty20 cricket. He reached his half-century from 26 balls and finished with 75 off of 36 balls.

=== 2019 Cricket World Cup and beyond ===
In April 2019, Shahzad was named in Afghanistan's squad for the 2019 Cricket World Cup. However, on 6 June 2019, he was ruled out of the tournament due to a knee injury, and was replaced by Ikram Ali Khil. Later in an interview, Shahzad said that he had no health problem but despite, that he was removed from the World Cup matches by the Afghan cricket board. He also said that it does not seem that he will return to the team.

In September 2021, he was named in Afghanistan's squad for the 2021 ICC Men's T20 World Cup. On 31 October 2021, in Afghanistan's T20 World Cup match against Namibia, Shahzad became the first player for Afghanistan to score 2,000 runs in T20I cricket.

== Twenty20 franchise cricket ==
In September 2016, Shahzad was signed by the Rangpur Riders in the Bangladesh Premier League (BPL) ahead of the draft for the 2016 season. On his BPL debut for the Riders, he scored 80 runs not out in a big nine-wicket win. In a match against the Barisal Bulls, Shahzad broke the record for the most dismissals by a wicket-keeper in a BPL match with five (two catches and three stumpings), but this record was equalled by Umar Akmal in a match against the Riders later in the season. Three stumpings is also the most stumpings by a wicket-keeper in a BPL match. During a match against the Rajshahi Kings, Shahzad made physical contact with Sabbir Rahman with his bat. He was found guilty of violating Article 2.1.1 of the BCB's Code of Conduct and was fined 30% of his match fee and suspended for two matches. Shahzad was Rangpur's leading run-scorer for the season with 350 runs from 11 matches and a strike-rate of 110. In October 2018, he was named in the squad for the Chittagong Vikings team, following the draft for the BPL's 2018–19 season.

In September 2018, Shahzad was named in Paktia's squad in the first edition of the Afghanistan Premier League tournament. Before the tournament, Shahzad was approached by a match-fixer, requesting he underperform in the tournament. He was the leading run-scorer in the tournament, with 344 runs in nine matches at a strike-rate of 174.61.

== Domestic cricket ==
Due to spending time with Afghanistan's national team, Shahzad has not played much top-level domestic cricket in Afghanistan. He has only played two matches in the Ahmad Shah Abdali 4-day Tournament, both in the 2015–16 season, before the tournament gained first-class status. He played for the Band-e-Amir Dragons, captaining the team in his first match. He also captained the Spin Ghar Tigers in the 2018 Ghazi Amanullah Khan Regional One Day Tournament. He scored two centuries in the tournament and was named the player of the match on both occasions, and he helped Spin Ghar reach the final, where they lost to the Boost Defenders.

Shahzad played in the first three seasons of the Shpageeza Cricket League, Afghanistan's national Twenty20 competition, from 2014 to 2016. In 2014, he played for the Boost Defenders, but he then changed teams to the Kabul Eagles, who won the 2016 edition of the tournament. Shahzad scored 90 runs in the 2016 tournament final and was named the player of the match.

Shahzad has also played domestic cricket in Pakistan. In the 2010–11 season, he played three matches for Port Qasim Authority in Grade II of the PCB Patron's Trophy, and he played two matches as a wicket-keeper and opening batsman for Habib Bank Limited in the 2015–16 National One Day Cup, scoring 43 runs against Khan Research Laboratories and 15 runs against National Bank of Pakistan.

He also has the record of the fastest 50 in T10 history where he scored 74 off just 16 balls.

== Records and statistics ==
- Shahzad set the record for the most dismissals as a wicketkeeper in a single T20I innings (5) and also set the new record for becoming the first wicketkeeper from any team to involve in 5 dismissals in a T20I.
- During Zimbabwe tour in 2016, Shahzad scored the best innings of his cricketing career. With his magnificent century of 118 off 68, Shahzad has the most Twenty20 International Player of the Match awards by an affiliate member with 8 T20I Player of the Match awards. His score is currently the second highest T20I score by an associate player, after Hong Kong's Babar Hayat's 122 runs. Following this innings, his position in the ICC Player Rankings for T20I batsmen rose from 20th to 8th, his first time breaking into the top ten.
- On 8 March 2016, Shahzad became the first associate player to score 10 fifty-plus scores in T20Is. With his 50 against Scotland in a group match of 2016 ICC World Twenty20, he achieved his 10th T20I score more than fifty. This is twice more than the next highest among players from associate teams (Stephan Myburgh & Paul Stirling has 5 fifty plus scores).
- At the end of 2016, Shahzad was named the ICC's Associate and Affiliate Player of the Year.
- On 20 January 2017, during Desert T20 Challenge, Shahzad, as the first cricket player in history, scored two half-centuries in two separate international matches on the same day (80 against Oman and 52* against Ireland).
- During the T20I series v Ireland, Shahzad became only the second player in T20I history to hit 200 fours after Tillakaratne Dilshan. He is in the third place for hitting most fours (200).
- Shahzad hit the joint fastest half-century in T10 history when he reached his half century off 12 balls for Rajputs in 2018 T10 League.

== Incidents and suspensions ==
On 7 April 2009, during the 2009 Cricket World Cup Qualifier, Shahzad was reprimanded by the ICC for showing dissent at an umpire's decision. After he was given out leg before wicket, Shahzad showed his bat to the umpire to indicate that he thought he had hit the ball. He was not suspended, but he was warned about his future behaviour.

On 29 November 2016, during the 2016 Bangladesh Premier League, Shahzad was suspended by the Bangladesh Cricket Board for a physical altercation with Rajshahi Kings player Sabbir Rahman. During the fourth over of the second innings, while Shahzad was batting, Shahzad extended his bat as Rahman ran past. The incident came after the two players had been involved in a heated conversation in the first innings. Shahzad was found guilty of conduct contrary to the spirit of the game. He was suspended for two matches and fined 30% of his match fee.

On 13 April 2017, Shahzad was charged by the ICC for violating the anti-doping code. After testing his sample on 17 January 2017 at ICCA Academy in Dubai, it was found to contain a prohibited substance, Clenbuterol. Therefore, he was provisionally suspended 12 days after issuing the notice of charges being laid on 26 April 2017. On 30 April 2017, ICC confirmed the provisional suspension of Shahzad. Shahzad decided not to challenge the provisional suspension and had to face disciplinary proceeding in accordance with the process set down in the ICC Anti-Doping Code. In December 2017, the ICC suspended Shahzad from all cricket for a period of twelve months, and he was eligible to resume playing from 17 January 2018.

On 8 March 2018, during the 2018 Cricket World Cup Qualifier, Shahzad was suspended by the ICC after being found guilty of causing damage to part of the ground during a match. After being dismissed, Shahzad slammed his bat into the pitch adjacent to the pitch being used and left a noticeable divet in the pitch. He was fined 15% of his match fee. As this was Shahzad's second violation of the ICC's code of conduct within a two-year period, (he had been fined the entirety of his match fee for an incident in a Twenty20 against the United Arab Emirates in December 2016) he was given a two-match suspension.

In April 2018, Shahzad was fined and asked to relocate by the Afghanistan Cricket Board due to living in Peshawar, a city in Pakistan near its border with Afghanistan, and participating in a local club-level cricket competition. The ACB had introduced a strict policy on player residence, stating that players were not allowed to travel to other countries without permission, so Shahzad and other players were given one month to relocate to Afghanistan or risk having their contracts terminated. Additionally, by participating in a cricket competition without the ACB's permission, he had also violated the ACB's player code of conduct.
