= Fareed Zargar =

Afghan cricketer

Personal information
- Full name: Fareed Zargar
- Source: Cricinfo, 26 March 2018

Fareed Zargar is an Afghan cricketer. He made his first-class debut for Mis Ainak Region in the 2018 Ahmad Shah Abdali 4-day Tournament on 13 March 2018. He made his List A debut for Mis Ainak Region in the 2018 Ghazi Amanullah Khan Regional One Day Tournament on 23 July 2018.
