= Shamsurrahman =

Afghan cricketer (born 1999)

Personal information
- Full name: Shamsurrahman Wali Khail
- Born: 25 November 1999 (age 26)
- Batting: Right-handed
- Bowling: Right-arm offbreak

Domestic team information
- Years: Team
- 2018: Kabul Region
- 2019: Mis Ainak Region
- 2019: Speenghar Tigers
- 2019–2022, 2024–present: Band-e-Amir Region
- 2022–present: Hindukush Stars
- 2023: Pamir Legends
- 2023: Boost Region
- Source: Cricinfo, 10 March 2018

Shamsurrahman (born 25 November 1999) is an Afghan cricketer. He made his first-class debut for Kabul Region in the 2018 Ahmad Shah Abdali 4-day Tournament on 7 March 2018. Prior to his first-class debut, he was part of Afghanistan's squad for the 2016 Under-19 Cricket World Cup. He made his List A debut for Kabul Region in the 2018 Ghazi Amanullah Khan Regional One Day Tournament on 19 July 2018. He made his Twenty20 debut on 8 October 2019, for Speen Ghar Tigers in the 2019 Shpageeza Cricket League.
