= Naqib Nangarhari =

Afghan cricketer (born 1998)

Personal information
- Full name: Naqib Nangarhari
- Born: 29 July 1998 (age 28)
- Source: Cricinfo, 10 December 2017

Naqib Nangarhari (born 29 July 1998) is an Afghan cricketer. He made his first-class debut for Speen Ghar Region in the 2017–18 Ahmad Shah Abdali 4-day Tournament on 7 December 2017. He made his List A debut for Speen Ghar Region in the 2018 Ghazi Amanullah Khan Regional One Day Tournament on 25 July 2018.
