= Fitratullah Khawari =

Afghan cricketer (born 1997)

Personal information
- Born: 29 January 1997 (age 29)

Domestic team information
- Years: Team
- 2017: Mis Ainak Region
- Source: Cricinfo, 10 August 2017

Fitratullah Khawari (born 29 January 1997) is an Afghan cricketer. He made his List A debut for Mis Ainak Region in the 2017 Ghazi Amanullah Khan Regional One Day Tournament on 10 August 2017. He made his Twenty20 debut for Band-e-Amir Dragons in the 2017 Shpageeza Cricket League on 18 September 2017. He made his first-class debut for Speen Ghar Region in the 2017–18 Ahmad Shah Abdali 4-day Tournament on 20 October 2017.

In September 2018, he was named in Kabul's squad in the first edition of the Afghanistan Premier League tournament.
