= Kashmir Khan (cricketer) =

Afghan cricketer (born 1995)

Personal information
- Born: 2 December 1995 (age 30)
- Source: Cricinfo, 24 April 2018

Kashmir Khan (born 2 December 1995) is an Afghan cricketer. He made his first-class debut for Kabul Region in the 2018 Ahmad Shah Abdali 4-day Tournament on 22 April 2018.
