= Rahmatullah Sahaq =

Afghan cricketer (born 1997)

Personal information
- Born: 16 March 1997 (age 29)
- Source: Cricinfo, 17 September 2017

Rahmatullah Sahaq (born 16 March 1997) is an Afghan cricketer. He made his Twenty20 debut for Amo Sharks in the 2017 Shpageeza Cricket League on 17 September 2017. In October 2017, in his second first-class match, he made 176 not out for Mis Ainak Region in the 2017–18 Ahmad Shah Abdali 4-day Tournament.

He made his List A debut for Mis Ainak Region in the 2018 Ghazi Amanullah Khan Regional One Day Tournament on 10 July 2018.
