= Bahar Shinwari =

Afghan cricketer (born 2001)

Personal information
- Born: 11 March 2001 (age 25)
- Source: Cricinfo, 26 October 2017

Bahar Shinwari (born 11 March 2001) is an Afghan cricketer. He made his first-class debut for Boost Region in the 2017–18 Ahmad Shah Abdali 4-day Tournament on 26 October 2017. He made his List A debut for Kabul Region in the 2018 Ghazi Amanullah Khan Regional One Day Tournament on 10 July 2018. He made his Twenty20 debut for Boost Defenders in the 2019 Shpageeza Cricket League on 10 October 2019.
