= Imran Janat =

Afghan cricketer

Personal information
- Full name: Imran Janat
- Batting: Right-handed
- Bowling: Right-arm off-break
- Role: Batsman

Domestic team information
- Years: Team
- 2017: Mis Ainak Region
- Source: ESPNcricinfo, 27 January 2017

Imran Janat is an Afghan cricketer. His List A debut for Afghanistan A came against Zimbabwe A during their tour of Zimbabwe on 27 January 2017. He made his Twenty20 debut for Kabul Eagles in the 2017 Shpageeza Cricket League on 16 September 2017. He made his first-class debut for Band-e-Amir Region in the 2017–18 Ahmad Shah Abdali 4-day Tournament on 20 October 2017.

Janat was the leading run-scorer for Kabul Region in the 2018 Ahmad Shah Abdali 4-day Tournament, with 651 runs in eight matches.

In September 2018, he was named in Nangarhar's squad in the first edition of the Afghanistan Premier League tournament.
