= Zahidullah =

Afghan cricketer

Personal information
- Full name: Zahidullah
- Source: Cricinfo, 4 March 2018

Zahidullah is an Afghan cricketer. He made his first-class debut for Speen Ghar Region in the 2018 Ahmad Shah Abdali 4-day Tournament on 1 March 2018. He made his List A debut for Speen Ghar Region in the 2018 Ghazi Amanullah Khan Regional One Day Tournament on 10 July 2018.
