= Naseeb Dawlatzai =

Afghan cricketer

Personal information
- Full name: Naseeb Dawlatzai
- Source: Cricinfo, 11 April 2018

Naseeb Dawlatzai is an Afghan cricketer. He made his first-class debut for Speen Ghar Region in the 2018 Ahmad Shah Abdali 4-day Tournament on 8 April 2018.
