= Javed Zadran =

Afghan cricketer

Personal information
- Full name: Javed Zadran
- Source: Cricinfo, 26 October 2017

Javed Zadran is an Afghan cricketer. He made his first-class debut for Amo Region in the 2017–18 Ahmad Shah Abdali 4-day Tournament on 26 October 2017. He made his List A debut for Kabul Region in the 2018 Ghazi Amanullah Khan Regional One Day Tournament on 15 July 2018.
