= Said Mutabar =

Afghan cricketer (born 1997)

Personal information
- Born: 2 December 1997 (age 28)
- Source: Cricinfo, 1 November 2017

Said Mutabar (born 2 December 1997) is an Afghan cricketer. He made his first-class debut for Speen Ghar Region in the 2017–18 Ahmad Shah Abdali 4-day Tournament on 1 November 2017. He made his List A debut for Kabul Region in the 2018 Ghazi Amanullah Khan Regional One Day Tournament on 19 July 2018.
