= Sadiqullah Patan =

Afghan cricketer (born 1998)

Personal information
- Full name: Sadiqullah Patan
- Born: 27 August 1998 (age 28)
- Source: Cricinfo, 2 May 2018

Sadiqullah Patan (born 27 August 1998) is an Afghan cricketer. He made his first-class debut for Mis Ainak Region in the 2017–18 Ahmad Shah Abdali 4-day Tournament on 29 April 2018. He made his Twenty20 debut on 13 October 2019, for Mis Ainak Knights in the 2019 Shpageeza Cricket League.
