= Mohammad Inamullah =

Afghan cricketer (born 1996)

Personal information
- Full name: Ibrahim Khail Mohammad Inamullah
- Born: 26 June 1996 (age 30)
- Source: Cricinfo, 4 December 2017

Mohammad Inamullah (born 26 June 1996) is an Afghan cricketer. He made his first-class debut for Band-e-Amir Region in the 2017–18 Ahmad Shah Abdali 4-day Tournament on 1 December 2017. He made his List A debut for Kabul Region in the 2018 Ghazi Amanullah Khan Regional One Day Tournament on 15 July 2018.
