= Qasim Oryakhail =

Afghan cricketer (born 1992)

Personal information
- Born: 10 January 1992 (age 34)
- Source: Cricinfo, 12 September 2017

Qasim Oryakhail (born 10 January 1992) is an Afghan cricketer. He made his Twenty20 debut for Band-e-Amir Dragons in the 2017 Shpageeza Cricket League on 12 September 2017.

He made his first-class debut for Speen Ghar Region in the 2017–18 Ahmad Shah Abdali 4-day Tournament on 20 October 2017. He made his List A debut for Kabul Region in the 2018 Ghazi Amanullah Khan Regional One Day Tournament on 15 July 2018.
