= Karim Janat =

Afghan cricketer (born 1998)

Personal information
- Born: 11 August 1998 (age 28); Kabul, Afghanistan
- Batting: Right-handed
- Bowling: Right-arm medium-fast
- Role: Batting all-rounder
- Relatives: Asghar Afghan (brother)

International information
- National side: Afghanistan (2016–present)
- Test debut (cap 25): 14 June 2023 v Bangladesh
- Last Test: 28 February 2024 v Ireland
- ODI debut (cap 41): 24 February 2017 v Zimbabwe
- Last ODI: 5 September 2023 v Sri Lanka
- ODI shirt no.: 11
- T20I debut (cap 34): 14 December 2016 v UAE
- Last T20I: 18 September 2025 v Sri Lanka
- T20I shirt no.: 11

Domestic team information
- Years: Team
- 2017: Speen Ghar Region
- 2017-2021: Band-e-Amir Region
- 2018-2020: Kabul Eagles
- 2021: Comilla Victorians (squad no. 11)
- 2021-2022: Colombo Stars (squad no. 11)
- 2025: Gujarat Titans

Career statistics
Competition	Test	ODI	T20I	FC
Matches	2	3	75	25
Runs scored	95	32	759	1,906
Batting average	31.66	10.66	16.86	52.94
100s/50s	0/0	0/0	0/4	5/10
Top score	41*	22	56*	211*
Balls bowled	150	78	847	3,979
Wickets	0	0	42	73
Bowling average	–	–	27.64	34.32
5 wickets in innings	–	–	1	0
10 wickets in match	–	–	0	0
Best bowling	–	–	5/11	4/50
Catches/stumpings	0/–	0/–	17/–	12/–
Medal record
Representing Afghanistan
Men's Cricket
Asian Games
Silver medal – second place	2022 Hangzhou	Team
- Source: Cricinfo, 19 July 2026

Karim Janat (Pashto: کریم جنت) (born 11 August 1998) is an Afghan cricketer. He made his first-class debut against the England Lions on 7 December 2016. Prior to his first-class debut, he was part of Afghanistan's squad for the 2016 Under-19 Cricket World Cup.

== Domestic and T20 franchise career ==
Along with Zahir Khan, he was the joint-leading wicket-taker in the 2017 Ghazi Amanullah Khan Regional One Day Tournament, with twelve dismissals. He was also the leading wicket-taker for Kabul Region in the 2018 Ahmad Shah Abdali 4-day Tournament, with 30 dismissals in ten matches.

In September 2018, he was named in Kandahar's squad in the first edition of the Afghanistan Premier League tournament. In September 2020, he was the joint winner of the player of the tournament award in the 2020 Shpageeza Cricket League. In 2021, he received his first selections in overseas franchise tournaments, being selected by the Colombo Stars for the 2021 Lanka Premier League, and the Sylhet Sunrisers in the 2022 Bangladesh Premier League. In July 2022, he was signed by the Colombo Stars for the third edition of the Lanka Premier League.

In November 2024, he was picked by the Gujarat Titans for the 2025 Indian Premier League. He played one game in the tournament against the Rajasthan Royals in Jaipur, bowling one over and being smashed for 30 runs by Vaibhav Sooryavanshi, who went on to score a record-breaking match-winning century, helping the Royals to win by 8 wickets.

== International career ==
He made his Twenty20 International (T20I) debut against the United Arab Emirates on 14 December 2016. He scored 25 runs in the match and took 3 wickets. This all-round performance gave him his first man of the match award. He made his One Day International (ODI) debut against Zimbabwe at the Harare Sports Club on 24 February 2017.

In December 2018, he was named in Afghanistan's under-23 team for the 2018 ACC Emerging Teams Asia Cup. On 16 November 2019, in the second match against the West Indies, he took his first five-wicket haul in T20I cricket. He took five wickets for eleven runs from his four overs, and was named the player of the match. In November 2019, he was named in Afghanistan's Test squad for the one-off match against the West Indies.

In September 2021, he was named in Afghanistan's squad for the 2021 ICC Men's T20 World Cup.

He made his Test debut for Afghanistan against Bangladesh, on 14 June 2023.

In May 2024, he was named in Afghanistan's squad for the 2024 ICC Men's T20 World Cup tournament.
