= Zahidullah Salmi =

Afghan cricketer (born 2002)

Personal information
- Born: 3 April 2002 (age 24)
- Source: Cricinfo, 2 May 2018

Zahidullah Salmi, also known as Zahid, (born 3 April 2002) is an Afghan cricketer. He made his first-class debut for Speen Ghar Region in the 2017–18 Ahmad Shah Abdali 4-day Tournament on 29 April 2018.
