= Amir Hamza (cricketer) =

Afghan cricketer (born 1991)

Personal information
- Full name: Amir Hamza Hotak
- Born: 15 August 1991 (age 35); Nangarhar Province, Afghanistan
- Batting: Right-handed
- Bowling: Slow left-arm orthodox
- Role: Bowling all-rounder

International information
- National side: Afghanistan (2012–2023)
- Test debut (cap 18): 27 November 2019 v West Indies
- Last Test: 14 June 2023 v Bangladesh
- ODI debut (cap 25): 10 February 2012 v Pakistan
- Last ODI: 11 June 2017 v West Indies
- T20I debut (cap 22): 3 March 2013 v Scotland
- Last T20I: 19 March 2021 v Zimbabwe

Domestic team information
- Years: Team
- 2017: Speen Ghar Tigers

Career statistics
| Competition | Test | ODI | T20I | FC |
|---|---|---|---|---|
| Matches | 4 | 31 | 33 | 31 |
| Runs scored | 83 | 23 | 40 | 510 |
| Batting average | 20.75 | 3.28 | 10.00 | 12.43 |
| 100s/50s | 0/0 | 0/0 | 0/0 | 0/0 |
| Top score | 34 | 7 | 21 | 48 |
| Balls bowled | 984 | 1,552 | 666 | 7,358 |
| Wickets | 18 | 40 | 30 | 162 |
| Bowling average | 28.72 | 25.40 | 25.06 | 20.12 |
| 5 wickets in innings | 2 | 0 | 0 | 13 |
| 10 wickets in match | 0 | 0 | 0 | 2 |
| Best bowling | 6/75 | 4/17 | 3/39 | 6/30 |
| Catches/stumpings | 2/– | 10/– | 1/– | 17/– |
Medal record
Men's Cricket
Representing Afghanistan
Asian Games
| Silver medal – second place | 2014 Incheon | Team |
- Source: Cricinfo, 19 July 2026

Amir Hamza Hotak (Pashto: امیر حمزه هوتک) (born 15 August 1991) is an Afghan cricketer who plays for the Afghanistan national cricket team. An all-rounder, Hotak bats right-handed and bowls slow left-arm orthodox.

== Career ==
Hotak was part of the Afghanistan Under-19 team which took part in the 2010 ICC Under-19 World Cup in New Zealand. His only appearance in that tournament came against the Papua New Guinea Under-19s. He later made his first-class debut against Canada in the 2011-13 ICC Intercontinental Cup. Hotak later made his One Day International debut in Afghanistan's first One Day International against a Full Member Test-playing nation, when they played Pakistan at Sharjah in February 2012. Batting at number ten, Hotak was dismissed for a six ball duck by Wahab Riaz in Afghanistan's innings of 195, while in Pakistan's innings he bowled four wicketless overs, conceding 22 runs. Pakistan won the encounter by 7 wickets.

He was the leading wicket-taker in the 2018 Ahmad Shah Abdali 4-day Tournament, finishing with 67 dismissals in ten matches.

In September 2018, he was named in Kandahar's squad in the first edition of the Afghanistan Premier League tournament.

=== Test cricket ===
In May 2018, he was named in Afghanistan's squad for their inaugural Test match, played against India, but he was not selected in the final eleven that played the match. In November 2019, he was again named in Afghanistan's Test squad, this time for the one-off match against the West Indies. He made his Test debut for Afghanistan, against the West Indies, on 27 November 2019. In the match, he became the first bowler for Afghanistan to take a five-wicket haul on debut in Tests.
