= Naveen-ul-Haq =

Afghan cricketer (born 1999)

Personal information
- Full name: Naveen-ul-Haq Murid
- Born: 23 September 1999 (age 27); Kabul, Afghanistan
- Height: 1.86 m (6 ft 1 in)
- Batting: Right-handed
- Bowling: Right-arm medium-fast
- Role: Bowler

International information
- National side: Afghanistan (2016–present)
- ODI debut (cap 39): 25 September 2016 v Bangladesh
- Last ODI: 10 November 2023 v South Africa
- ODI shirt no.: 78
- T20I debut (cap 40): 21 September 2019 v Bangladesh
- Last T20I: 14 December 2024 v Zimbabwe
- T20I shirt no.: 78

Domestic team information
- Years: Team
- 2023-2024: Lucknow Super Giants (squad no. 78)
- 2020-2021: Guyana Amazon Warriors
- 2021-2023: Leicestershire
- 2021: Kandy Tuskers
- 2022: Colombo Stars
- 2022: Khulna Tigers
- 2024-present: Durban's Super Giants

Career statistics
Competition	ODI	T20I	FC	LA
Matches	15	48	10	31
Runs scored	37	44	93	108
Batting average	7.40	4.88	7.75	8.30
100s/50s	0/0	0/0	0/0	0/0
Top score	10*	13	34	30
Balls bowled	691	967	1,304	1,505
Wickets	22	67	31	42
Bowling average	32.18	18.73	25.22	36.28
5 wickets in innings	0	0	1	1
10 wickets in match	0	0	0	0
Best bowling	4/42	4/20	8/35	5/40
Catches/stumpings	4/–	10/–	5/–	7/–
- Source: ESPNcricinfo, 2 April 2024

Naveen-ul-Haq Murid (Pashto: نوین الحق مرید; born 23 September 1999) is a cricketer who made his international debut for Afghanistan in September 2016.

== Domestic and T20 franchise career ==
Naveen made his first-class debut for Kabul Region in the 2018 Ahmad Shah Abdali 4-day Tournament on 7 March 2018.

In September 2018, Naveen was named in Nangarhar's squad in the first edition of the Afghanistan Premier League tournament. In November 2019, he was selected to play for the Sylhet Thunder in the 2019–20 Bangladesh Premier League. In July 2020, he was named in the Guyana Amazon Warriors squad for the 2020 Caribbean Premier League. In October 2020, he was drafted by the Kandy Tuskers for the inaugural edition of the Lanka Premier League.

In February 2021, Naveen was signed by the Leicestershire Foxes ahead of the 2021 T20 Blast tournament in England. In October 2021, he was resigned by Leicestershire for the 2022 summer in England. In June 2022, in the T20 Blast match against the Worcestershire Rapids, he took his first five-wicket haul in Twenty20 cricket, with 5/11 from his four overs. The following month, he was signed by the Colombo Stars for the third edition of the Lanka Premier League. In December 2022, he was bought by the Lucknow Super Giants in the 2023 Indian Premier League auction.

== International career ==
Naveen made his One Day International (ODI) debut against Bangladesh on 25 September 2016. Prior to his ODI debut, he was part of Afghanistan's squad for the 2016 Under-19 Cricket World Cup. In December 2016, he was the captain for Afghanistan in the 2016 Under-19 Asia Cup.

Naveen made his Twenty20 (T20) debut for Afghanistan against Namibia on 19 January 2017 in the 2017 Desert T20 Challenge.

In December 2017, Naveen was named as the captain of Afghanistan's squad for the 2018 Under-19 Cricket World Cup.

In August 2019, Naveen was named in Afghanistan's Twenty20 International (T20I) squad for the 2019–20 Bangladesh Tri-Nation Series. He made his T20I debut for Afghanistan, against Bangladesh, on 21 September 2019. In September 2021, he was named in Afghanistan's squad for the 2021 ICC Men's T20 World Cup.

In May 2024, he was named in Afghanistan's squad for the 2024 ICC Men's T20 World Cup tournament.

== Retirement ==
In 2023, Naveen announced his retirement from ODI cricket after the ICC 2023 Cricket World Cup.
