= 2018 Afghanistan Premier League =

Twenty20 cricket franchise tournament in Afghanistan

- Official logo of APL (2018)
- Dates: 5 October – 21 October 2018
- Administrator: Afghanistan Cricket Board
- Cricket format: Twenty20
- Tournament format(s): Double round-robin and Playoffs
- Host: United Arab Emirates
- Champions: Balkh Legends (1st title)
- Runners-up: Kabul Zwanan
- Participants: 5
- Matches: 23
- Player of the series: Rashid Khan (Kabul Zwanan)
- Most runs: Mohammad Shahzad (344)
- Most wickets: Isuru Udana (17)
- Official website: aplt20.tv

The Afghanistan Premier League (Pashto: د افغانستان غوره لیګ), officially known as the Gulbahar Afghanistan Premier League for sponsorship reasons in its inaugural season, was a professional Twenty20 cricket franchise league operated by the Afghanistan Cricket Board (ACB). Founded in 2018, the tournament featured five franchise teams named after distinct geographical regions of Afghanistan.

The inaugural edition took place between 5 and 21 October 2018 at the Sharjah Cricket Stadium in the United Arab Emirates, involving up to forty international overseas players. The Balkh Legends won the inaugural title after defeating Kabul Zwanan by four wickets in the final.

== History ==
=== Background ===
The creation of the Afghanistan Premier League followed Afghanistan's rapid rise in international cricket and its attainment of Full Member status in the International Cricket Council (ICC) in 2017. Following the success of Afghan players in global tournaments such as the Indian Premier League (IPL) and the Big Bash League, the ACB sought to establish a high-profile domestic franchise tournament. The primary objectives were to provide local players exposure to international standards, improve financial independence for the board, and develop cricket infrastructure. Matches were hosted in the United Arab Emirates due to security considerations in Afghanistan. In August 2018, the ICC officially approved plans for the tournament.

=== Inaugural season (2018) ===
The player draft for the inaugural season was held on 10 September 2018 in Dubai, featuring a pool of over 350 players. Franchises operated under a salary cap of US$555,000 to US$700,000. Five "Icon Players" were chosen to lead each team: Chris Gayle (Balkh Legends), Rashid Khan (Kabul Zwanan), Brendon McCullum (Kandahar Knights), Andre Russell (Nangarhar Leopards), and Shahid Afridi (Paktia Panthers).

However, player availability saw restrictions; the Pakistan Cricket Board (PCB) refused to grant No Objection Certificates (NOCs) to active Pakistani players, and the Bangladesh Cricket Board (BCB) denied NOCs to Mohammad Mithun and Soumya Sarkar.

The tournament concluded on 21 October 2018, with Balkh Legends, captained by Mohammad Nabi, defeating Kabul Zwanan by four wickets in the final to become champions. Rashid Khan was named Player of the Tournament.

=== Postponement, contractual issues, and legal dispute ===
In September 2019, the ACB officially terminated its 10-year commercial agreement with commercial partner Snixer Sports (and associated entity Snooker City), citing financial non-payment of rights fees, lack of transparency, and integrity risks. This resulted in a US$15 million breach-of-contract lawsuit filed by Snixer Sports against the ACB in a London arbitration court. Complications arising from the COVID-19 pandemic and regional geopolitical developments further postponed planned revivals.

=== Termination and lawsuit ===
Following the inaugural 2018 season, the league faced a major legal crisis. In September 2019, the ACB terminated its 10-year commercial agreement with Snixer Sports, citing material breaches and integrity risks. This led to a US$15 million lawsuit filed by Snixer Sports in a London arbitration court, which brought international attention to the league's governance.

=== Anti-Corruption investigations ===
The 2018 season was subject to investigation by the ICC Anti-Corruption Unit (ACU). Afghan wicket-keeper Shafiqullah Shafaq was subsequently banned for six years after admitting to corruption charges during the tournament. Additionally, icon player Mohammad Shahzad reported an illegal spot-fixing approach to the ACU during the league stage.

== Draft and personnel signings ==
The player draft for the inaugural season was held on 10 September 2018 in Dubai. Over 350 players from across the globe were included in the draft pool.

The franchises operated with a salary cap between US$555,000 and US$700,000 to secure a squad of 17 to 20 players. Players were categorized into five tiers: Icon, Diamond, Gold, Silver, and Emerging.

=== Salary brackets ===
- Icon Players: US$100,000
- Diamond: US$75,000 (Overseas) / US$60,000 (Local)
- Gold: US$50,000 (Overseas) / US$40,000 (Local)
- Silver: US$30,000 (Overseas) / US$20,000 (Local)
- ICC Associate: US$15,000
- Emerging: US$10,000

=== Marquee signings ===
Five "Icon Players" were selected by the franchises during the draft:

- Balkh Legends: (Cricket West Indies) Chris Gayle
- Kabul Zwanan: (Afghanistan) Rashid Khan
- Kandahar Knights: (New Zealand) Brendon McCullum
- Nangarhar Leopards: (Cricket West Indies) Andre Russell
- Paktia Panthers: (Pakistan) Shahid Afridi

== Teams ==
| Location of Afghanistan Premier League teams |

| Team | City / Region | Debut | Zone | Head Coach | Captain |
|---|---|---|---|---|---|
| Balkh Legends | Mazar-i-Sharif, Balkh Province | 2018 | North | (Australia) Simon Helmot | (Afghanistan) Mohammad Nabi |
| Kabul Zwanan | Kabul, Kabul Province | 2018 | Central | (Zimbabwe) Heath Streak | (Afghanistan) Rashid Khan |
| Kandahar Knights | Kandahar, Kandahar Province | 2018 | Southwest | (England) Kabir Ali | (Afghanistan) Asghar Afghan |
| Nangarhar Leopards | Jalalabad, Nangarhar Province | 2018 | East | (India) Venkatesh Prasad | (Australia) Ben Cutting |
| Paktia Panthers | Khost, Khost Province | 2018 | Southeast | (Afghanistan) Dawlat Ahmadzai | (Pakistan) Shahid Afridi |

== Squads ==
The following squads were finalized on 10 September 2018.

| Balkh Legends | Kabul Zwanan | Kandahar Knights | Nangarhar Leopards | Paktia Panthers |
Head coach
| (Australia) Simon Helmot | (Zimbabwe) Heath Streak | (England) Kabir Ali | (India) Venkatesh Prasad | (Afghanistan) Dawlat Ahmadzai |
Squad
| (Afghanistan) Mohammad Nabi (c); (Cricket West Indies) Chris Gayle; (New Zealand) Colin Munro; (England) Ravi Bopara; (Netherlands) Ryan ten Doeschate; (Australia) Ben Laughlin; (Pakistan) Kamran Akmal; (Afghanistan) Gulbadin Naib; (Afghanistan) Mirwais Ashraf; (Afghanistan) Aftab Alam; (Afghanistan) Qais Ahmad; (Afghanistan) Usman Ghani; (Afghanistan) Ikram Alikhil; (Afghanistan) Darwish Rasooli | (Afghanistan) Rashid Khan (c); (New Zealand) Luke Ronchi; (South Africa) Colin Ingram; (South Africa) Wayne Parnell; (England) Laurie Evans; (Pakistan) Sohail Tanvir; (United States) Ali Khan; (Afghanistan) Hazratullah Zazai; (Afghanistan) Javed Ahmadi; (Afghanistan) Fareed Ahmad; (Afghanistan) Muslim Musa; (Afghanistan) Shahidullah; (Afghanistan) Afsar Zazai; (Afghanistan) Zahir Shehzad | (Afghanistan) Asghar Afghan (c); (New Zealand) Brendon McCullum; (England) Tymal Mills; (England) Sam Billings; (Ireland) Paul Stirling; (Ireland) Kevin O'Brien; (Pakistan) Wahab Riaz; (Afghanistan) Karim Janat; (Afghanistan) Najibullah Zadran; (Afghanistan) Karim Sadiq; (Afghanistan) Sayed Shirzad; (Afghanistan) Mohammad Naveed; (Afghanistan) Waqar Salamkheil; (Afghanistan) Nasir Jamal | (Australia) Ben Cutting (c); (Cricket West Indies) Andre Russell; (New Zealand) Mitchell McClenaghan; (Bangladesh) Mushfiqur Rahim; (Pakistan) Mohammad Hafeez; (New Zealand) Anton Devcich; (Cricket West Indies) Johnson Charles; (Afghanistan) Mujeeb Ur Rahman; (Afghanistan) Shafiqullah; (Afghanistan) Rahmat Shah; (Afghanistan) Najeeb Tarakai; (Afghanistan) Zahir Khan; (Nepal) Sandeep Lamichhane; (Afghanistan) Naveen-ul-Haq | (Afghanistan) Mohammad Shahzad (c); (Pakistan) Shahid Afridi; (Sri Lanka) Thisara Perera; (South Africa) Cameron Delport; (England) Chris Jordan; (England) Luke Wright; (Sri Lanka) Isuru Udana; (Zimbabwe) Sikandar Raza; (Afghanistan) Samiullah Shinwari; (Afghanistan) Sharafuddin Ashraf; (Afghanistan) Azmatullah Omarzai; (Afghanistan) Rahmanullah Gurbaz; (Afghanistan) Zia-ur-Rehman; (Afghanistan) Yamin Ahmadzai |

== Venue ==
All matches for the tournament were held at the Sharjah Cricket Stadium in Sharjah, UAE.

| Sharjah, UAE | Cricket Venue of APL in Emirate of Sharjah |
| Sharjah Cricket Stadium | Cricket Venue of APL in Emirate of Sharjah |
| Capacity: 16,000 | Cricket Venue of APL in Emirate of Sharjah |
| Matches: 19 | Cricket Venue of APL in Emirate of Sharjah |

== Tournament Results & Finals ==
| Season | Final | | | | Player of the season |
| Season | Winner | Result | Runner-up | Venue | Player of the season |
|---|---|---|---|---|---|
| 2018 | Balkh Legends; 138/6 (18.1 overs) | Balkh Legends won by 4 wickets Scorecard | Kabul Zwanan; 132/9 (20 overs) | Sharjah Cricket Stadium, Sharjah | Rashid Khan (Kabul Zwanan) |

== Performance by team ==
| Team(s) | Performance |
|---|---|
| Balkh Legends | C |
| Paktia Panthers | SF |
| Kabul Zwanan | RU |
| Nangarhar Leopards | SF |
| Kandahar Knights | 5th |

- Teams are listed alphabetically.
- C: Champions
- RU: Runner-up
- SF: Qualified for Semifinals

=== All-time standings ===
| Teams | Appearances | | | Best result | Statistics | | | | |
| Teams | Total | First | Latest | Best result | Played | Won | Lost | NR | Win (%) |
|---|---|---|---|---|---|---|---|---|---|
| Balkh Legends | 1 | 2018 | 2018 | Champions (2018) | 10 | 8 | 2 | 0 | 80.0 |
| Kabul Zwanan | 1 | 2018 | 2018 | Runners-up (2018) | 10 | 5 | 5 | 0 | 50.0 |
| Paktia Panthers | 1 | 2018 | 2018 | Semifinals (2018) | 9 | 5 | 4 | 0 | 55.5 |
| Nangarhar Leopards | 1 | 2018 | 2018 | Semifinals (2018) | 9 | 3 | 6 | 0 | 33.3 |
| Kandahar Knights | 1 | 2018 | 2018 | League stage (2018) | 8 | 2 | 6 | 0 | 25.0 |

== Points table ==
| Pos | Team | Pld | W | L | NR | Pts | NRR | Qualification |
|---|---|---|---|---|---|---|---|---|
| 1 | Balkh Legends (C) | 8 | 6 | 2 | 0 | 12 | 0.782 | Advance to Semifinal 1 |
| 2 | Paktia Panthers | 8 | 5 | 3 | 0 | 10 | 0.144 | Advance to Semifinal 1 |
| 3 | Kabul Zwanan (R) | 8 | 4 | 4 | 0 | 8 | −0.070 | Advance to Semifinal 2 |
| 4 | Nangarhar Leopards | 8 | 3 | 5 | 0 | 6 | −0.582 | Advance to Semifinal 2 |
| 5 | Kandahar Knights | 8 | 2 | 6 | 0 | 4 | −0.226 | Eliminated |

Source: ESPNcricinfo
(C) Champions; (R) Runners-up

== League stage ==
The fixture was released in September 2018.

Match 1
5 October 2018
20:30 (D/N)
Scorecard

| Paktia Panthers; 218/4 (20 overs) | v | Kabul Zwanan; 220/7 (19.1 overs) |
| Sikandar Raza 78* (40); Zahir Shehzad 2/36 (4 overs) | | Laurie Evans 79* (39); Tahir Khan 2/20 (2 overs) |

Kabul Zwanan won by 3 wickets
Sharjah Cricket Stadium, Sharjah
Umpires: Izatullah Safi (Afg) and Bismillah Jan Shinwari (Afg)
Player of the match: Laurie Evans (Kabul Zwanan)

- Kabul Zwanan won the toss and elected to field.
- Zahir Shehzad (Kabul Zwanan) made his T20 debut.

Match 2
6 October 2018
16:00 (D/N)
Scorecard

| Kandahar Knights; 139/9 (20 overs) | v | Nangarhar Leopards; 142/4 (18.3 overs) |
| Karim Janat 39 (39); Ben Cutting 5/28 (4 overs) | | Shafiqullah 35* (20); Karim Sadiq 1/5 (1 over) |

Nangarhar Leopards won by 6 wickets
Sharjah Cricket Stadium, Sharjah
Umpires: Farooq Khan (Afg) and Ahmed Shah Pakteen (Afg)
Player of the match: Ben Cutting (Nangarhar Leopards)

- Kandahar Knights won the toss and elected to bat.
- Waqar Salamkheil (Kandahar Knights) made his T20 debut. Ben Cutting took a hat-trick.

Match 3
6 October 2018
20:00 (D/N)
Scorecard

| Kabul Zwanan; 176/6 (20 overs) | v | Balkh Legends; 177/2 (18.5 overs) |
| Laurie Evans 64 (47); Mohammad Nabi 2/20 (4 overs) | | Ryan ten Doeschate 78* (46); Rashid Khan 1/24 (4 overs) |

Balkh Legends won by 8 wickets
Sharjah Cricket Stadium, Sharjah
Umpires: Izatullah Safi (Afg) and Bismillah Jan Shinwari (Afg)
Player of the match: Ryan ten Doeschate (Balkh Legends)

- Balkh Legends won the toss and elected to field.

Match 4
7 October 2018
16:00 (D/N)
Scorecard

| Paktia Panthers; 184/8 (20 overs) | v | Nangarhar Leopards; 163/6 (20 overs) |
| Mohammad Shahzad 53 (21); Ben Cutting 3/25 (4 overs) | | Ben Cutting 71 (39); Isuru Udana 2/28 (4 overs) |

Paktia Panthers won by 21 runs
Sharjah Cricket Stadium, Sharjah
Umpires: Farooq Khan (Afg) and Bismillah Jan Shinwari (Afg)
Player of the match: Ben Cutting (Nangarhar Leopards)

- Paktia Panthers won the toss and elected to bat.
- Azmatullah Omarzai (Paktia Panthers) made his T20 debut.

Match 5
7 October 2018
20:00 (D/N)
Scorecard

| Balkh Legends; 165/5 (20 overs) | v | Kandahar Knights; 152/7 (20 overs) |
| Colin Munro 46 (24); Karim Janat 1/19 (3 overs) | | Asghar Afghan 45 (32); Gulbadin Naib 4/12 (4 overs) |

Balkh Legends won by 13 runs
Sharjah Cricket Stadium, Sharjah
Umpires: Ahmed Shah Pakteen (Afg) and Izatullah Safi (Afg)
Player of the match: Gulbadin Naib (Balkh Legends)

- Kandahar Knights won the toss and elected to field.

Match 6
9 October 2018
20:00 (D/N)
Scorecard

| Nangarhar Leopards; 188/5 (20 overs) | v | Kabul Zwanan; 191/3 (17.5 overs) |
| Anton Devcich 94* (58); Shahidullah 1/10 (1 over) | | Hazratullah Zazai 124 (55); Zahir Khan 1/20 (3.5 overs) |

Kabul Zwanan won by 7 wickets
Sharjah Cricket Stadium, Sharjah
Umpires: Anil Chaudhary (Ind) and Ahmed Shah Pakteen (Afg)
Player of the match: Hazratullah Zazai (Kabul Zwanan)

- Kabul Zwanan won the toss and elected to field.

Match 7
10 October 2018
20:00 (D/N)
Scorecard

| Paktia Panthers; 204/4 (20 overs) | v | Balkh Legends; 167 (19 overs) |
| Cameron Delport 70* (48); Gulbadin Naib 2/46 (4 overs) | | Mohammad Nabi 40 (15); Isuru Udana 4/38 (4 overs) |

Paktia Panthers won by 37 runs
Sharjah Cricket Stadium, Sharjah
Umpires: Anil Chaudhary (Ind) and Bismillah Jan Shinwari (Afg)
Player of the match: Cameron Delport (Paktia Panthers)

- Balkh Legends won the toss and elected to field.
- Ziaur Rahman (Paktia Panthers) made his T20 debut.

Match 8
11 October 2018
16:00 (D/N)
Scorecard

| Kabul Zwanan; 173/6 (20 overs) | v | Kandahar Knights; 171/7 (20 overs) |
| Laurie Evans 57* (29); Sayed Shirzad 3/36 (4 overs) | | Asghar Afghan 52 (32); Shahidullah 2/18 (4 overs) |

Kabul Zwanan won by 2 runs
Sharjah Cricket Stadium, Sharjah
Umpires: Ahmed Shah Durrani (Afg) and Ahmed Shah Pakteen (Afg)
Player of the match: Shahidullah (Kabul Zwanan)

- Kandahar Knights won the toss and elected to field.

Match 9
11 October 2018
20:00 (D/N)
Scorecard

| Balkh Legends; 143/7 (20 overs) | v | Nangarhar Leopards; 118 (19.1 overs) |
| Ryan ten Doeschate 35 (27); Mujeeb Ur Rahman 2/19 (4 overs) | | Anton Devcich 48 (44); Mirwais Ashraf 4/19 (4 overs) |

Balkh Legends won by 25 runs
Sharjah Cricket Stadium, Sharjah
Umpires: Anil Chaudhary (Ind) and Bismillah Jan Shinwari (Afg)
Player of the match: Mirwais Ashraf (Balkh Legends)

- Nangarhar Leopards won the toss and elected to field.

Match 10
12 October 2018
16:00 (D/N)
Scorecard

| Paktia Panthers; 127 (18.2 overs) | v | Kandahar Knights; 118 (19.4 overs) |
| Sikandar Raza 51 (42); Sayed Shirzad 4/19 (3.2 overs) | | Karim Janat 27 (23); Isuru Udana 3/19 (4 overs) |

Paktia Panthers won by 9 runs
Sharjah Cricket Stadium, Sharjah
Umpires: Anil Chaudhary (Ind) and Bismillah Jan Shinwari (Afg)
Player of the match: Isuru Udana (Paktia Panthers)

- Paktia Panthers won the toss and elected to bat.

Match 11
12 October 2018
20:00 (D/N)
Scorecard

| Nangarhar Leopards; 182/5 (20 overs) | v | Kabul Zwanan; 167/9 (20 overs) |
| Anton Devcich 77 (46); Wayne Parnell 2/47 (4 overs) | | Luke Ronchi 50 (31); Rahmat Shah 3/25 (4 overs) |

Nangarhar Leopards won by 15 runs
Sharjah Cricket Stadium, Sharjah
Umpires: Anil Chaudhary (Ind) and Izatullah Safi (Afg)
Player of the match: Rahmat Shah (Nangarhar Leopards)

- Kabul Zwanan won the toss and elected to field.

Match 12
13 October 2018
16:00 (D/N)
Scorecard

| Balkh Legends; 195/4 (20 overs) | v | Paktia Panthers; 106 (15.2 overs) |
| Ryan ten Doeschate 74* (41); Sikandar Raza 1/12 (2 overs) | | Rahmanullah Gurbaz 33 (22); Ravi Bopara 3/17 (3 overs) |

Balkh Legends won by 89 runs
Sharjah Cricket Stadium, Sharjah
Umpires: Ahmed Shah Pakteen (Afg) and Bismillah Jan Shinwari (Afg)
Player of the match: Ryan ten Doeschate (Balkh Legends)

- Balkh Legends won the toss and elected to bat.

Match 13
13 October 2018
20:00 (D/N)
Scorecard

| Kandahar Knights; 136/8 (20 overs) | v | Nangarhar Leopards; 110 (19.3 overs) |
| Karim Janat 40* (21); Mujeeb Ur Rahman 4/16 (4 overs) | | Shafiqullah 23 (9); Waqar Salamkheil 3/20 (4 overs) |

Kandahar Knights won by 26 runs
Sharjah Cricket Stadium, Sharjah
Umpires: Anil Chaudhary (Ind) and Ahmed Shah Durrani (Afg)
Player of the match: Karim Janat (Kandahar Knights)

- Kandahar Knights won the toss and elected to bat.

Match 14
14 October 2018
16:00 (D/N)
Scorecard

| Balkh Legends; 244/6 (20 overs) | v | Kabul Zwanan; 223/7 (20 overs) |
| Chris Gayle 80 (48); Fareed Ahmad 2/48 (3 overs) | | Hazratullah Zazai 62 (17); Ben Laughlin 3/37 (3 overs) |

Balkh Legends won by 21 runs
Sharjah Cricket Stadium, Sharjah
Umpires: Anil Chaudhary (Ind) and Ahmed Shah Pakteen (Afg)
Player of the match: Chris Gayle (Balkh Legends)

- Balkh Legends won the toss and elected to bat.

Match 15
14 October 2018
20:00 (D/N)
Scorecard

| Nangarhar Leopards; 126 (20 overs) | v | Paktia Panthers; 129/3 (14.4 overs) |
| Rahmat Shah 32 (38); Ziaur Rahman 3/27 (4 overs) | | Mohammad Shahzad 78* (43); Sandeep Lamichhane 2/23 (4 overs) |

Paktia Panthers won by 7 wickets
Sharjah Cricket Stadium, Sharjah
Umpires: Anil Chaudhary (Ind) and Bismillah Jan Shinwari (Afg)
Player of the match: Mohammad Shahzad (Paktia Panthers)

- Nangarhar Leopards won the toss and elected to bat.

Match 16
16 October 2018
20:00 (D/N)
Scorecard

| Kandahar Knights; 152/5 (20 overs) | v | Kabul Zwanan; 153/6 (19.1 overs) |
| Asghar Afghan 60 (31); Fareed Ahmad 2/40 (4 overs) | | Laurie Evans 32* (31); Karim Janat 3/14 (4 overs) |

Kabul Zwanan won by 4 wickets
Sharjah Cricket Stadium, Sharjah
Umpires: Anil Chaudhary (Ind) and Ahmed Shah Pakteen (Afg)
Player of the match: Rashid Khan (Kabul Zwanan)

- Kabul Zwanan won the toss and elected to field.

Match 17
17 October 2018
16:00 (D/N)
Scorecard

| Balkh Legends; 133/7 (20 overs) | v | Nangarhar Leopards; 134/4 (18 overs) |
| Ravi Bopara 35 (32); Naveen-ul-Haq 2/21 (4 overs) | | Andre Fletcher 48 (22); Qais Ahmad 3/19 (4 overs) |

Nangarhar Leopards won by 6 wickets
Sharjah Cricket Stadium, Sharjah
Umpires: Bismillah Jan Shinwari (Afg) and Ahmed Shah Pakteen (Afg)
Player of the match: Andre Fletcher (Nangarhar Leopards)

- Balkh Legends won the toss and elected to bat.

Match 18
17 October 2018
20:00 (D/N)
Scorecard

| Paktia Panthers; 167/7 (20 overs) | v | Kandahar Knights; 168/6 (20 overs) |
| Samiullah Shinwari 65 (43); Sayed Shirzad 3/36 (4 overs) | | Asghar Afghan 74 (42); Ziaur Rahman 3/40 (4 overs) |

Kandahar Knights won by 4 wickets
Sharjah Cricket Stadium, Sharjah
Umpires: Anil Chaudhary (Ind) and Izatullah Safi (Afg)
Player of the match: Asghar Afghan (Kandahar Knights)

- Paktia Panthers won the toss and elected to bat.

Match 19
18 October 2018
16:00 (D/N)
Scorecard

| Kandahar Knights; 141/9 (20 overs) | v | Balkh Legends; 142/4 (17.5 overs) |
| Brendon McCullum 50 (33); Mirwais Ashraf 3/24 (4 overs) | | Chris Gayle 73 (22); Waqar Salamkheil 2/21 (4 overs) |

Balkh Legends won by 6 wickets
Sharjah Cricket Stadium, Sharjah
Umpires: Ahmed Shah Durrani (Afg) and Ahmed Shah Pakteen (Afg)
Player of the match: Chris Gayle (Balkh Legends)

- Balkh Legends won the toss and elected to field.
- Samiullah (Balkh Legends) made his T20 debut.

Match 20
18 October 2018
20:00 (D/N)
Scorecard

| Kabul Zwanan; 168/4 (20 overs) | v | Paktia Panthers; 172/4 (19.4 overs) |
| Colin Ingram 83* (51); Isuru Udana 2/33 (4 overs) | | Mohammad Shahzad 62 (27); Wayne Parnell 2/33 (3.4 overs) |

Paktia Panthers won by 6 wickets
Sharjah Cricket Stadium, Sharjah
Umpires: Anil Chaudhary (Ind) and Bismillah Jan Shinwari (Afg)
Player of the match: Mohammad Shahzad (Paktia Panthers)

- Kabul Zwanan won the toss and elected to bat.
- Usman Adil (Kabul Zwanan) made his T20 debut.

== Knockout stage ==
=== Bracket ===
Semifinals
1 | Balkh Legends | 235/5 (20 overs)
4 | Nangarhar Leopards | 64 (13.1 overs)
2 | Paktia Panthers | 102 (14.5 overs)
3 | Kabul Zwanan | 192/9 (20 overs)

Final
SF1W | Balkh Legends | 138/6 (18.1 overs)
SF2W | Kabul Zwanan | 132/9 (20 overs)

=== Semifinals ===
Semifinal 1
19 October 2018
20:00 (D/N)
Scorecard

| Balkh Legends; 235/5 (20 overs) | v | Nangarhar Leopards; 64 (13.1 overs) |
| Darwish Rasooli 78 (45); Ben Cutting 2/38 (4 overs) | | Andre Fletcher 13 (13); Mohammad Nabi 4/12 (3.1 overs) |

Balkh Legends won by 171 runs
Sharjah Cricket Stadium, Sharjah
Umpires: Anil Chaudhary (Ind) and Ahmed Shah Pakteen (Afg)
Player of the match: Mohammad Nabi (Balkh Legends)

- Balkh Legends won the toss and elected to bat.

Semifinal 2
20 October 2018
20:00 (D/N)
Scorecard

| Kabul Zwanan; 192/9 (20 overs) | v | Paktia Panthers; 102 (14.5 overs) |
| Colin Ingram 44 (27); Shahid Afridi 2/25 (4 overs) | | Shahid Afridi 27 (16); Rashid Khan 4/20 (3.5 overs) |

Kabul Zwanan won by 90 runs
Sharjah Cricket Stadium, Sharjah
Umpires: Anil Chaudhary (Ind) and Bismillah Jan Shinwari (Afg)
Player of the match: Rashid Khan (Kabul Zwanan)

- Kabul Zwanan won the toss and elected to bat.

=== Final ===
Final
21 October 2018
20:00 (D/N)
Scorecard

| Kabul Zwanan; 132/9 (20 overs) | v | Balkh Legends; 138/6 (18.1 overs) |
| Javed Ahmadi 32 (19); Qais Ahmad 5/18 (4 overs) | | Chris Gayle 56 (34); Wayne Parnell 3/35 (4 overs) |

Balkh Legends won by 4 wickets
Sharjah Cricket Stadium, Sharjah
Umpires: Anil Chaudhary (Ind) and Ahmed Shah Pakteen (Afg)
Player of the match: Qais Ahmad (Balkh Legends)

- Kabul Zwanan won the toss and elected to bat.

== Records and statistics ==
A summary of the most notable statistical records associated with the tournament is provided below.

As of 25 December 2025

=== Batting records ===
Batting summary
| Most runs | Mohammad Shahzad (PP) | 344 |
| Highest score | Hazratullah Zazai (KZ) | 124 vs Nangarhar Leopards (9 October 2018) |
| Highest partnership | Luke Ronchi & Hazratullah Zazai (KZ) | 144 vs Nangarhar Leopards (9 October 2018) |
| Most centuries | Hazratullah Zazai (KZ) | 1 |

==== Most runs ====
| Player | Team | Runs |
|---|---|---|
| Mohammad Shahzad | Paktia Panthers | 344 |
| Hazratullah Zazai | Kabul Zwanan | 322 |
| Chris Gayle | Balkh Legends | 315 |
| Laurie Evans | Kabul Zwanan | 305 |
| Ryan ten Doeschate | Balkh Legends | 274 |

- Source: ESPNcricinfo

=== Bowling records ===
Bowling summary
| Most wickets | Isuru Udana (PP) | 17 |
| Best bowling figures | Qais Ahmad (BL) | 5/18 vs Kabul Zwanan (21 October 2018) |

==== Most wickets ====
| Wickets | Player | Team | Inns. | Econ. | BBI |
|---|---|---|---|---|---|
| 17 | Isuru Udana | Paktia Panthers | 8 | 7.65 | 4/38 |
| 16 | Sayed Shirzad | Kandahar Knights | 8 | 7.82 | 4/19 |
| 15 | Qais Ahmad | Balkh Legends | 9 | 6.26 | 5/18 |
| 14 | Mirwais Ashraf | Balkh Legends | 9 | 7.97 | 4/19 |
| 13 | Wayne Parnell | Kabul Zwanan | 10 | 8.96 | 3/35 |

- Source: ESPNcricinfo

=== Fielding records ===
| Record Type(s) | Player(s) | Total |
|---|---|---|
| Most dismissals (wicket-keeper) | Ikram Alikhil (BL) | 8 |
| Most catches (fielder) | Naveen-ul-Haq (NL) | 9 |

=== Team records ===
| Record Type | Team | Result |
|---|---|---|
| Highest total | Balkh Legends | 244/6 vs Kabul Zwanan (14 October 2018) |
| Lowest total | Nangarhar Leopards | 64/10 vs Balkh Legends (19 October 2018) |

== Media and broadcasting ==
Global media rights for the tournament were awarded to a consortium led by ITW and Trans Group. The 2018 inaugural season was broadcast in over 10 countries across television and digital platforms.

=== List of broadcasters ===
| Country/Region | Television | Internet |
|---|---|---|
| Afghanistan | TOLO TV; Lemar TV | YouTube (Official Channel) |
| India | DSport | JioTV |
| Pakistan | Geo Super; PTV Sports | Geo Super App |
| United Kingdom | FreeSports | Premier Player |
| United States; Canada | Willow TV | Willow TV Online |
| Middle East; North Africa | OSN Sports | Wavo |
| South Africa | SuperSport | SuperSport Play |
| Rest of the World | None | YouTube |

== See also ==
- Cricket in Afghanistan
- Cricket leagues in Afghanistan
- Sports in Afghanistan
- Professional sports leagues in Afghanistan
- Shpageeza Cricket League
- Green Afghanistan One Day Cup
