= Afghanistan Premier League =

Cricket tournament in Afghanistan

- Countries: Afghanistan
- Administrator: Afghanistan Cricket Board
- Format: Twenty20
- First edition: 2018
- Tournament format: Double round-robin and Knockout
- Number of teams: 5
- Current champion: Balkh Legends (1st title)
- Most successful: Balkh Legends (1 title)
- Most runs: Mohammad Shahzad (344)
- Most wickets: Isuru Udana (17)
- Website: aplt20.tv

The Afghanistan Premier League (Pashto: د افغانستان غوره لیګ), officially Gulbahar Afghanistan Premier League for sponsorship reasons, was a Twenty20 cricket franchise tournament run by the Afghanistan Cricket Board (ACB). Founded in 2018, five teams were selected to compete, named after regions of Afghanistan. The only tournament took place between 5 and 21 October 2018 at the Sharjah Cricket Stadium, with up to forty overseas players involved. In August 2018, the International Cricket Council (ICC) approved plans for the tournament.

In September 2018, the Pakistan Cricket Board (PCB) announced that they would not give No Objection Certificates (NOCs) to the active Pakistani players. In October 2018, the Bangladesh Cricket Board (BCB) denied to give NOCs to Mohammad Mithun and Soumya Sarkar.

Balkh Legends won the maiden title, after beating Kabul Zwanan by four wickets in the final.

== Background and history ==
=== Background ===
The creation of the Afghanistan Premier League followed Afghanistan's rapid rise in international cricket and its attainment of Full Member status in the International Cricket Council (ICC) in 2017. Following the success of Afghan players in global tournaments like the Indian Premier League (IPL) and the Big Bash League, the Afghanistan Cricket Board (ACB) sought to establish a high-profile domestic T20 league. The primary objectives were to provide local players with exposure to international standards, improve the board's financial independence, and bring high-level cricket to Afghan fans, although matches were ultimately held in the United Arab Emirates due to security considerations.

=== History ===
The Afghanistan Premier League (APL) was established by the Afghanistan Cricket Board (ACB) in 2018 to provide a professional platform for domestic talent following the country's attainment of Full Member status.

==== Initial season and success (2018) ====
The inaugural season of the APL was launched in October 2018 at the Sharjah Cricket Stadium. The tournament featured five franchises representing different regions of Afghanistan: Balkh Legends, Kabul Zwanan, Kandahar Knights, Nangarhar Leopards, and Paktia Panthers. The league attracted significant international attention, with veteran stars such as Chris Gayle, Shahid Afridi, Brendon McCullum, and Andre Russell participating. The tournament concluded with the Balkh Legends, captained by Mohammad Nabi, defeating Kabul Zwanan to become the first-ever champions.

==== Postponement and contractual issues ====
Despite the sporting success of the first season, the league faced immediate administrative challenges. In September 2019, the ACB officially terminated its agreement with the commercial partner, Snooker City, citing non-payment of rights fees and lack of transparency. The league was subsequently suspended due to governance concerns and delayed player payments. Over the following years, the combination of the COVID-19 pandemic and political transitions within Afghanistan further delayed any attempts at a restart.

==== Termination and lawsuit ====
Following the inaugural 2018 season, the league faced a major legal crisis. In September 2019, the ACB terminated its 10-year commercial agreement with Snixer Sports, citing material breaches and integrity risks. This led to a US$15 million lawsuit filed by Snixer Sports in a London arbitration court, which brought international attention to the league's governance.

==== 2026 revival ====
In June 2024, the ACB confirmed that they were in the final stages of planning a relaunch for the tournament. The board cited the need for a premier T20 platform to sustain the development of the national team. In December 2024, it was announced that the tournament is officially scheduled to return in October 2026, with the UAE likely to host the matches once again.

In December 2025, the ACB officially announced the return of the league. The new edition is scheduled for October 2026, with the board citing the league as essential for the continued development of the Afghanistan national cricket team.

== Teams ==
Location of Afghanistan Premier League teams

Team	City	Debut	Region	Head Coach	Captain
Balkh Legends	Mazar-i-Sharif, Balkh Province	2018	North	(Australia) Simon Helmot	(Afghanistan) Mohammad Nabi
Kabul Zwanan	Kabul, Kabul Province	2018	Central	(Zimbabwe) Heath Streak	(Afghanistan) Rashid Khan
Kandahar Knights	Kandahar, Kandahar Province	2018	Southwest	(England) Kabir Ali	(Afghanistan) Asghar Afghan
Nangarhar Leopards	Jalalabad, Nangarhar Province	2018	East	(India) Venkatesh Prasad	(Australia) Ben Cutting
Paktia Panthers	Khost, Khost Province	2018	Southeast	(Afghanistan) Dawlat Ahmadzai	(Pakistan) Shahid Afridi

== Finals ==
Season	Final				Player of the season
Season	Winner	Result	Runner-up	Venue	Player of the season
2018	Balkh Legends; 138/6 (18.1 overs)	Balkh Legends won by 4 wickets Scorecard	Kabul Zwanan; 132/9 (20 overs)	Sharjah Cricket Stadium, Sharjah	Rashid Khan (Kabul Zwanan)

== Performance by team ==
=== Seasons ===
Season (No. of teams)	2018 (5)
Balkh Legends	C
Paktia Panthers	SF
Kabul Zwanan	RU
Nangarhar Leopards	SF
Kandahar Knights	5th

- Teams have been listed alphabetically.
- C: Champions
- RU: Runner-up
- SF: Team qualified for the semifinals stage of the competition
- Source: ESPNcricinfo

=== All time standings ===
Teams	Appearances			Best result	Statistics				
Teams	Total	First	Latest	Best result	Played	Won	Lost	NR	Win (%)
Balkh Legends	1	2018	2018	Champions (2018)	10	8	2	0	80.0
Kabul Zwanan	1	2018	2018	Runners-up (2018)	10	5	5	0	50.0
Paktia Panthers	1	2018	2018	Semifinals (2018)	9	5	4	0	55.5
Nangarhar Leopards	1	2018	2018	Semifinals (2018)	9	3	6	0	33.3
Kandahar Knights	1	2018	2018	League stage (2018)	8	2	6	0	25.0

== Records and statistics ==
A summary of the most notable statistical records associated with the tournament is provided below.

As of 25 December 2025

Batting records
Most runs	Mohammad Shahzad (PP)	344
Highest score	Hazratullah Zazai (KZ)	124 vs Nangarhar Leopards (9 October 2018)
Highest partnership	Luke Ronchi & Hazratullah Zazai (KZ)	144 vs Nangarhar Leopards (9 October 2018)
Most centuries	Hazratullah Zazai (KZ)	1
Most runs in Season	Mohammad Shahzad (PP)	344 (2018)
Bowling records
Most wickets	Isuru Udana (PP)	17
Most wickets in a season	Isuru Udana (PP)	17 (2018)
Fielding records
Most dismissals (wicket-keeper)	Ikram Alikhil (BL)	8
Most catches (fielder)	Naveen-ul-Haq (NL)	9
Team records
Highest total	Balkh Legends	244/6 vs Kabul Zwanan (14 October 2018)
Lowest total	Nangarhar Leopards	64/10 vs Balkh Legends (19 October 2018)

- Source: Records extracted from ESPNcricinfo.

== Media and broadcasting ==
The Afghanistan Cricket Board (ACB) awarded the global media rights for the inaugural season to a consortium led by ITW and Trans Group. For the 2018 season, the league was broadcast in over 10 countries through various television and digital platforms.

=== List of broadcasters (2018 season) ===
The inaugural edition was broadcast live on the following channels and platforms:

Country/Region	Television	Internet
Afghanistan	TOLO TV; Lemar TV	YouTube (Official Channel)
India	DSport	JioTV
Pakistan	Geo Super; PTV Sports	Geo Super App
United Kingdom	FreeSports	Premier Player
United States; Canada	Willow TV	Willow TV Online
Middle East; North Africa	OSN Sports	Wavo
South Africa	SuperSport	SuperSport Play
Rest of the World	None	YouTube

== See also ==
- Cricket in Afghanistan
- List of cricket league in Afghanistan.
- Sports in Afghanistan – An overview of sports culture in Nepal
- List of professional sports leagues in Afghanistan
- Shpageeza Cricket League
- Green Afghanistan One Day Cup
