= Amo Sharks =

Cricket team in Afghanistan

- امو نهنګان; Amō Nahangān

Personnel
- Captain: (Afghanistan) Azmatullah Omarzai
- Coach: (Afghanistan) Aftab Alam

Team information
- Founded: 2013; 13 years ago
- Home ground: Balkh Cricket Stadium, Mazar-i-Sharif

History
- Shpageeza wins: 2 (2024, 2025)

Amo Sharks (Pashto: امو نهنګان Amō Nahangān; Dari: آمو نهنگان) or Amo Region is one of eight regional first-class cricket teams in Afghanistan. The regional side represents the following provinces in the north of Afghanistan: Balkh, Faryab, Jowzjan, Samangan, and Sar-i-Pul. The team is named after the Amo, a river in northern Afghanistan and Central Asia.

Amo Region compete in the Ahmad Shah Abdali 4-day Tournament, which has had first-class status from 2017 onwards. In October 2017, they lost their opening fixture of the tournament, against Speen Ghar Region, by an innings and 46 runs.

They also play in the Ghazi Amanullah Khan Regional One Day Tournament, which was granted List A status from 2017., and the Afghan Shpageeza Cricket League Twenty20 competition (which has Twenty20 status from 2017) using the name Amo Sharks. They also take part in the Qosh Tepa National T20 Cup, the first edition of which will be held in April 2024.
