= Boost Defenders =

Afghanistan cricket team

- بوست ساتونکي; Bōst Sātūnkī

Personnel
- Captain: (Afghanistan) Rahmat Shah
- Coach: (Afghanistan) Hamid Hassan

Team information
- Founded: 2013; 13 years ago
- Home ground: Kandahar International Cricket Stadium, Kandahar
- Capacity: 14,000

History
- Shpageeza wins: 0
- GAK wins: 1 (2018)

Boost Defenders (Pashto: بوست ساتونکي Bōst Sātūnkī) or Boost Region is one of eight regional first-class cricket teams in Afghanistan. The region represents the following provinces in the south and southwest of Afghanistan: Kandahar, Helmand, Nimroz, Uruzgan and Zabul. The team is named after Bōst, the historical name of Lashkargah city in Helmand Province.

Boost Region compete in the Ahmad Shah Abdali 4-day Tournament, which has first-class status from 2017 onwards. In October 2017, they won their opening fixture of the tournament, against Mis Ainak Region, by 73 runs.

They also play in the Ghazi Amanullah Khan Regional One Day Tournament, which was granted List A status from 2017 and the Afghan Shpageeza Cricket League Twenty20 competition (which has Twenty20 status from 2017) using the name Boost Defenders.

In July 2018, they were one of the six teams invited to play in the first edition of the Abu Dhabi T20 Trophy. Boost Region took part in the Qosh Tepa National T20 Cup, the first edition of which was held in May 2024.
