= 2026 Nepal Premier League =

Twenty20 cricket tournament in Nepal

- Tournament logo
- Dates: 26 October – 21 November 2026
- Administrator: Cricket Association of Nepal
- Cricket format: Twenty20
- Tournament format(s): Group stage and playoffs
- Champions: Sudurpaschim Royals (1st title)
- Runners-up: Lumbini Lions
- Participants: 8
- Matches: 32
- Player of the series: Dipendra Singh Airee (Sudurpaschim Royals)
- Most runs: Yuvraaj Samra (Pokhara Avengers) (294)
- Most wickets: Rijan Dhakal (Chitwan Rhinos) (17)
- Official website: npl-t20.com

The 2026 Nepal Premier League, also known as Siddhartha Bank NPL 2026 for sponsorship reasons, was the third edition of the Nepal Premier League (NPL), a professional Twenty20 cricket franchise league in Nepal. The tournament featured eight teams competing in 32 matches from 26 October to 21 November 2026.

In the final, Sudurpaschim Royals defeated Lumbini Lions by 10 wickets to win their inaugural title.

== Background ==
The Nepal Premier League is a franchise Twenty20 cricket league in Nepal and organised by the Cricket Association of Nepal (CAN) and features eight franchise teams. The season consists of 32 matches.

Ahead of the season, the franchises submitted their retention lists before the player auction. A total of 52 players were retained by the eight franchises. The player auction was held on 6 July 2026 in Kathmandu, Nepal, with 155 players shortlisted and 37 players sold.

On 16 October 2026, the International Cricket Council (ICC) officially sanctioned the Nepal Premier League and lifted restrictions on active four Test players and also all the matches of 2026 editions were classified as List A T20.

=== Overseas signings ===
The season also saw the franchises strengthen their squads through the signing of overseas players. Shakib Al Hasan joined Pokhara Avengers while Dhananjaya Lakshan was also signed by the franchise. Scott Kuggeleijn returned to Sudurpaschim Royals. while Jimmy Neesham returned to Janakpur Bolts. Kona Srikar Bharat was signed by Kathmandu Gorkhas and Niroshan Dickwella was retained by defending champions Lumbini Lions. David Warner signing with the Kathmandu Gurkhas Biratnagar Kings have signed Sri Lanka international Charith Asalanka. Janakpur Bolts have signed Pakistani all-rounder Iftikhar Ahmed. Biratnagar Kings have re-signed American all-rounder Shubham Ranjane. Sudurpaschim Royals have re-signed Scotland all-rounder Brandon McMullen. Karnali Yaks have signed Bangladesh batter Ariful Islam. Janakpur Bolts have signed England all-rounder Moeen Ali. Pokhara Avengers have signed Sri Lankan pace-bowling all-rounder Chamika Karunaratne. Chitwan Rhinos have signed Pakistan leg-spinner Usama Mir. Pokhara Avengers have signed Bangladeshi all-rounder Mahedi Hasan. Karnali Yaks signing Pakistani all-rounder Hussain Talat. Pakistan’s T20I captain Sahibzada Farhan signing with Karnali Yaks. Lumbini Lions signed United States all-rounder Shadley van Schalkwyk, while Biratnagar Kings have recruited former Sri Lankan captain Angelo Mathews. West Indies all-rounder Andre Russell signing with Biratnagar Kings. Pokhara Avengers signing of Bangladesh international Mohammad Saifuddin. Karnali Yaks signing South African batter David Miller. Lumbini Lions signing Bangladeshi batting all-rounder Shamim Hossain. Sudurpaschim Royals signed West Indies international Sherfane Rutherford. Janakpur Bolts signed Pakistani fast bowler Hunain Shah. Sudurpaschim Royals signed West Indies all-rounder Fabian Allen..

A total of 61 overseas players from 16 countries were registered across the eight teams for the 2026 the Nepal Premier League, of whom 57 appeared in at least on match.

== Teams ==
Team	2025 performance	Captain	Head coach
Lumbini Lions	Champions	Rohit Paudel	Tinu Yohannan
Sudurpaschim Royals	Runners-up	Dipendra Singh Airee	Misbah-ul-Haq
Biratnagar Kings	3rd	Sandeep Lamichhane	Dhammika Prasad
Kathmandu Gorkhas	4th	Karan KC	Sharad Vesawkar
Pokhara Avengers	5th	Chamika Karunaratne	Ajantha Mendis
Karnali Yaks	6th	David Miller	Gyanendra Malla
Chitwan Rhinos	7th	Sikandar Raza	Sohail Tanvir
Janakpur Bolts	8th	Harmeet Singh	Shivnarine Chanderpaul

=== Auction and personnel changes ===
The franchises were required to submit their retention lists ahead of the 2026 season, and a total of 52 players were retained by the eight franchises ahead of the auction. The auction was held on 6 July 2026 in Kathmandu, Nepal. A total of 155 players were shortlisted for the auction, of which 37 players were sold. Aasif Sheikh became the most expensive player of the auction, being bought by Lumbini Lions for NPR 20 lakh.

== Squads ==
The player auction took place on 6 July 2026.

Biratnagar Kings	Chitwan Rhinos	Janakpur Bolts	Karnali Yaks
Sandeep Lamichhane (c); Basir Ahamad; Dilsad Ali; Charith Asalanka; Lokesh Bam (wk); Subash Bhandari; Pratis GC; Shehan Jayasuriya; Narayan Joshi; Angelo Mathews; Ayush Neupane (Note: Selected by the franchise team as a local iconic player.); Aprajit Poudel; Shubham Ranjane; Andre Russell; Naren Saud; Imran Sheikh; Rupesh Singh; Pratik Shrestha; Sujan Thapaliya	Sikandar Raza (c); Kamal Singh Airee; Hasan Ali; Deepak Bohara; Ravi Bopara; Mousom Dhakal; Rijan Dhakal; Ashok Dhami; Roshan Jha; Gautam KC; Dev Khanal; Salahuddin Khan; Ranjit Kumar; Dawid Malan; Kushal Malla; Usama Mir; Kamil Mishara; Dan Mousley; Mohammad Nawaz; Bipin Rawal (wk); Kaleem Sana; Arjun Saud (wk); Virandeep Singh; Tom Taylor; Bibek Yadav	Harmeet Singh (c); Bikash Aagri; Moeen Ali; Ryan Burl; Trit Raj Das; Rit Gautam; Saif Hassan; Santosh Karki; Aaditya Mahata; Jimmy Neesham; Aashutosh Pandey; Kusal Perera (wk); Bishal Patel; Lalit Rajbanshi; Amar Rautela; Anil Sah (wk); Bishal Susling; Harry Tector; Abhishek Tiwari; Mayan Yadav; Rahul Yadav	David Miller (c); Jishan Alam; Akbar Ali (wk); Deepak Dumre (wk); Sahibzada Farhan; Ariful Islam; Gulshan Jha; Sompal Kami; Shubh Kansakar; Yuvraj Khatri; Diwan Pun; Dipendra Rawat; Pawan Sarraf; Hikmat Shahi; Bipin Sharma; Sachin Sharma; Unish Thakuri; Hussain Talat; Surya Tamang; Mark Watt; Nandan Yadav
Kathmandu Gorkhas	Lumbini Lions	Pokhara Avengers	Sudurpaschim Royals
Karan KC (c); Mohammad Aadil Alam; Sahan Arachchige; Will Bosisto; Sonu Devkota; Ganesh Gautam; Sam Heazlett; Prashiddha Jaisi; Dipesh Kandel; Jahandad Khan; Rashid Khan; Suryanshu Koirala; Dayanand Mandal; Sahil Patel (wk); Smit Patel (wk); Krishna Paudel; Dev Shah; Bhim Sharki; David Warner; Santosh Yadav	Rohit Paudel (c); Dinesh Adhikari; Tilak Bhandari; Ajay Chauhan; Niroshan Dickwella (wk); Abhishesh Gautam; Durgesh Gupta; Shamim Hossain; Sundeep Jora; Karan Gharti Magar; Kishore Mahato; Sher Malla; Dilip Nath (wk); Shadley van Schalkwyk; D'Arcy Short; Aasif Sheikh (wk); Ali Sheikh; Grant Stewart; Aakash Tripathi; Ruben Trumpelmann; Arniko Yadav	Chamika Karunaratne (c); Bipin Archarya; Sudip Aryal; Kushal Bhurtel; Sunny BK; Aakash Chand; Sagar Dhakal; Arjun Gharti; Mahedi Hasan; Shakib Al Hasan; Dinesh Kharel; Arjun Kumal; Bipin Khatri; Dhananjaya Lakshan; Bibek Magar; Maroof Merchant; Bishwas Parajuli; Pratik Pokhrel; Mohammad Saifuddin; Sadeera Samarawickrama (wk); Yuvraaj Samra; Kiran Thagunna	Dipendra Singh Airee (c); Haider Ali; Fabian Allen; Binod Bhandari (wk); Abinash Bohara; Dipak Bohara; Milan Bohara; Sachin Bhatta; Ayub Chand; Hemant Dhami; Anil Kharel; Scott Kuggeleijn; Hikmat Mahara; George Munsey; Ishan Pandey; Tek Rawat; Sherfane Rutherford; Aarif Sheikh; Tek Raj Thalal; Saif Zaib

=== Withdrawn players ===
Withdrawn players from the 2026 Nepal Premier League
Player	Team	Reason	Withdrawal announcement date	Replacement	Signing date	Ref.
Sahibzada Farhan	Karnali Yaks	National duty	26 October 2026	—N/a		
Hunain Shah	Janakpur Bolts	NOC not issued by the PCB	26 October 2026	—N/a		
Iftikhar Ahmed	Janakpur Bolts	NOC not issued by the PCB	26 October 2026	—N/a		
K. S. Bharat	Kathmandu Gorkhas	Abu Dhabi T10 commitments	4 November 2026	—N/a		
Sherfane Rutherford	Sudurpaschim Royals	Abu Dhabi T10 commitments	5 November 2026	Fabian Allen	5 November 2026	
Shahab Alam	Kathmandu Gorkhas	Injury	15 November 2026	Dipesh Kandel	15 November 2026	
Brandon McMullen	Sudurpaschim Royals	ILT20 commitments	14 November 2026	George Munsey	16 November 2026	

== Venue ==
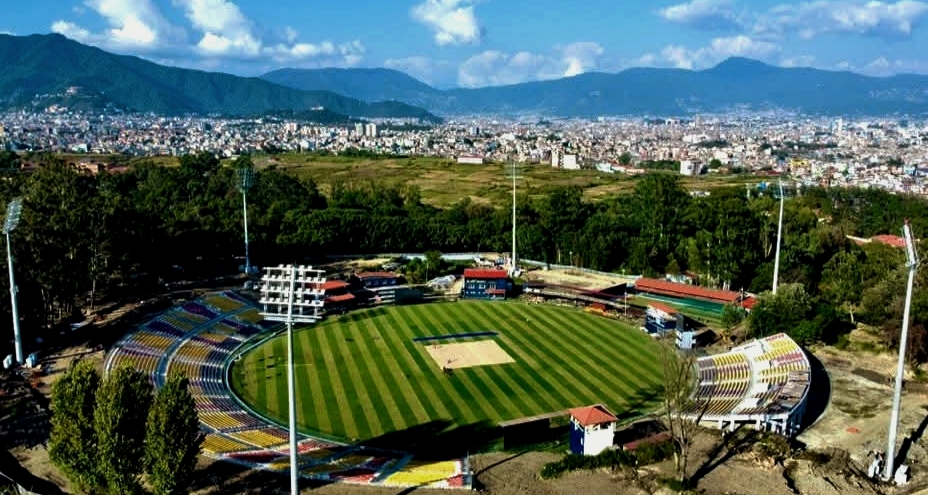
Tribhuvan University International Cricket Stadium, Kirtipur

All matches will be played at the Tribhuvan University International Cricket Ground in Kirtipur, Kathmandu.

== Teams and standings ==
=== Points table ===
Pos	Team	Pld	W	L	NR	Pts	NRR	Qualification
1	Lumbini Lions (R)	7	5	1	1	11	1.256	Advance to Qualifier 1
2	Sudurpaschim Royals (C)	7	5	2	0	10	0.135	Advance to Qualifier 1
3	Kathmandu Gorkhas	7	4	3	0	8	0.360	Advance to Eliminator
4	Chitwan Rhinos	7	3	3	1	7	0.011	Advance to Eliminator
5	Biratnagar Kings	7	3	4	0	6	−0.467	Eliminated
6	Karnali Yaks	7	3	4	0	6	−0.640	Eliminated
7	Pokhara Avengers	7	2	5	0	4	−0.175	Eliminated
8	Janakpur Bolts	7	2	5	0	4	−0.422	Eliminated

Source: Cricinfo, Cricclubs
(C) Champions; (R) Runners-up

=== Match summary ===
Team	Group matches							Playoffs		
Team	1	2	3	4	5	6	7	Q1/E	Q2	F
Biratnagar Kings	0	0	2	4	4	6	6			
Chitwan Rhinos	2	3	3	5	5	7	7	W	L	
Janakpur Bolts	0	2	4	4	4	4	4			
Karnali Yaks	2	4	4	4	4	4	6			
Kathmandu Gorkhas	0	2	4	6	8	8	8	L		
Lumbini Lions	2	3	5	7	7	9	11	W		L
Pokhara Avengers	0	0	0	0	2	2	4			
Sudurpaschim Royals	0	2	2	4	6	8	10	L	W	W

Win	Loss	No result

- Note: The total points at the end of each group match are listed.
- Note: Click on the points (group matches) or W/L (playoffs) to see the match summary.

Visitor team →	BK	CR	JB	KY	KG	LL	PA	SR
Home team ↓	BK	CR	JB	KY	KG	LL	PA	SR
Biratnagar Kings		Chitwan; 8 runs	Biratnagar; 2 runs			Lumbini; 4 wickets	Biratnagar; 4 wickets	
Chitwan Rhinos				Karnali; 24 runs	Kathmandu; 10 runs		Chitwan; 30 runs	
Janakpur Bolts		Chitwan; 4 wickets			Janakpur; 8 wickets		Janakpur; 9 runs	
Karnali Yaks	Karnali; 4 wickets		Karnali; 19 runs			Lumbini; 4 wickets		
Kathmandu Gorkhas	Kathmandu; 9 wickets			Kathmandu; 4 wickets		Kathmandu; 36 runs		Sudurpaschim; 7 runs
Lumbini Lions		Match abandoned	Lumbini; 16 runs				Lumbini; 8 wickets	Lumbini; 7 wickets
Pokhara Avengers				Pokhara; 63 runs	Pokhara; 55 runs			Sudurpaschim; 6 wickets
Sudurpaschim Royals	Biratnagar; 35 runs	Sudurpaschim; 5 wickets	Sudurpaschim; 27 runs	Sudurpaschim; 39 runs				

Home team won	Visitor team won

- Note: Results listed are according to the home (horizontal) and visitor (vertical) teams.
- Note: Click on a result to see a summary of the match.

== League stage ==
The fixtures for the 2026 season were initially announced on 19 September 2026. However, on 20 October 2026, the Nepal Premier League announced a revised schedule for evening matches following the incorporation of the Decision Review System (DRS).

Match 1
26 October 2026
17:00 (D/N)
Scorecard

Sudurpaschim Royals; 87 (17.2 overs)	v	Lumbini Lions; 88/3 (9.5 overs)
Dipendra Singh Airee 27 (23); Kishore Mahato 4/28 (4 overs)		D'Arcy Short 40 (18); Anil Kharel 2/9 (2 overs)

Lumbini Lions won by 7 wickets
Tribhuvan University International Cricket Ground, Kirtipur
Umpires: Buddhi Pradhan (Nep) and Masudur Rahman (Ban)
Player of the match: Sher Malla (Lumbini Lions)

- Lumbini Lions won the toss and elected to field.
- Tilak Bhandari, Kishor Mahato (Lumbini Lions) and Anil Kharel (Sudurpaschim Royals) all made their T20 debuts.

Match 2
27 October 2026
12:30
Scorecard

Chitwan Rhinos; 157/3 (20 overs)	v	Biratnagar Kings; 149 (19.3 overs)
Dawid Malan 70 (50); Angelo Mathews 1/15 (3 overs)		Imran Sheikh 39 (31); Kamal Singh Airee 4/26 (4 overs)

Chitwan Rhinos won by 8 runs
Tribhuvan University International Cricket Ground, Kirtipur
Umpires: Prageeth Rambukwella (SL) and Ram Kailash Yadav (Nep)
Player of the match: Kamal Singh Airee (Chitwan Rhinos)

- Biratnagar Kings won the toss and elected to field.
- Ranjit Kumar (Chitwan Rhinos), Imran Sheikh and Naren Saud (Biratnagar Kings) all made their T20 debuts.

Match 3
27 October 2026
17:00 (D/N)
Scorecard

Karnali Yaks; 132/9 (20 overs)	v	Janakpur Bolts; 113 (19.3 overs)
Ariful Islam 43 (29); Harmeet Singh 3/22 (4 overs)		Abhishek Tiwari 20 (17); Unish Thakuri 3/22 (4 overs)

Karnali Yaks won by 19 runs
Tribhuvan University International Cricket Ground, Kirtipur
Umpires: Himal Giri (Nep) and Durga Subedi (Nep)
Player of the match: Unish Thakuri (Karnali Yaks)

- Janakpur Bolts won the toss and elected to field.
- Trit Raj Das, Aaditya Mahata, Abhisekh Tiwari, Mayan Yadav, Rahul Yadav (Janakpur Bolts), Deepak Dumre, Yuvraj Khatri and Unish Thakuri (Karnali Yaks) all made their T20 debuts.

Match 4
28 October 2026
17:00 (D/N)
Scorecard

Pokhara Avengers; 145/7 (20 overs)	v	Sudurpaschim Royals; 148/4 (16.5 overs)
Arjun Gharti 40* (25); Anil Kharel 3/23 (3 overs)		Dipendra Singh Airee 51* (36); Dhananjaya Lakshan 1/17 (2 overs)

Sudurpaschim Royals won by 6 wickets
Tribhuvan University International Cricket Ground, Kirtipur
Umpires: Sanjay Sigdel (Nep) and Masudur Rahman (Ban)
Player of the match: Dipendra Singh Airee (Sudurpaschim Royals)

- Sudurpaschim Royals won the toss and elected field.
- Dinesh Kharel and Pratik Pokhrel (Pokhara Avengers) both made their T20 debuts.

Match 5
29 October 2026
12:30
Scorecard

Kathmandu Gorkhas; 115 (19.3 overs)	v	Janakpur Bolts; 116/2 (17.2 overs)
Bhim Sharki 33 (29); Rahul Yadav 4/31 (4 overs)		Moeen Ali 58* (51); Ripon Mondol 1/17 (3 overs)

Janakpur Bolts won by 8 wickets
Tribhuvan University International Cricket Ground, Kirtipur
Umpires: Buddhi Pradhan (Nep) and Kamlesh Thakur (Nep)
Player of the match: Rahul Yadav (Janakpur Bolts)

- Kathmandu Gorkhas won the toss and elected to bat.
- Sumit Maharjan, Harishankar Shah (Kathmandu Gorkhas) and Amar Routela (Janakpur Bolts) all made their T20 debuts.

Match 6
29 October 2026
17:00 (D/N)
Scorecard

Biratnagar Kings; 186/7 (20 overs)	v	Karnali Yaks; 187/6 (19.5 overs)
Lokesh Bam 87 (52); Sompal Kami 4/33 (4 overs)		Sompal Kami 62* (32); Angelo Mathews 3/25 (4 overs)

Karnali Yaks won by 4 wickets
Tribhuvan University International Cricket Ground, Kirtipur
Umpires: Prageeth Rambukwella (SL) and Hiralal Raut (Nep)
Player of the match: Sompal Kami (Karnali Yaks)

- Karnali Yaks won the toss and elected to field.
- Sujan Thapaliya (Biratnagar Kings) made his T20 debut.

Match 7
31 October 2026
12:30
Scorecard

Lumbini Lions	v	Chitwan Rhinos

Match abandoned
Tribhuvan University International Cricket Ground, Kirtipur
Umpires: Prageeth Rambukwella (SL) and Ram Kailash Yadav (Nep)

- No toss.
- No play was possible due to rain and wet outfield.

Match 8
31 October 2026
17:00 (D/N)
Scorecard

Biratnagar Kings; 105/2 (5 overs)	v	Sudurpaschim Royals; 70/3 (5 overs)
Shehan Jayasuriya 39 (11); Abinash Bohara 2/28 (2 overs)		Scott Kuggeleijn 28* (6); Andre Russell 1/8 (2 overs)

Biratnagar Kings won by 35 runs
Tribhuvan University International Cricket Ground, Kirtipur
Umpires: Himal Giri (Nep) and Masudur Rahman (Ban)
Player of the match: Andre Russell (Biratnagar Kings)

- Sudurpaschim Royals won the toss and elected to field.
- The match was reduced to 5 overs per side due to rain.
- Andre Russell (Biratnagar Kings) scored his 10,000th run in T20s.

Match 9
1 November 2026
17:00 (D/N)
Scorecard

Janakpur Bolts; 147/7 (20 overs)	v	Pokhara Avengers; 138/9 (20 overs)
Trit Raj Das 62 (55); Shakib Al Hasan 3/15 (4 overs)		Kushal Bhurtel 35 (24); Moeen Ali 3/13 (4 overs)

Janakpur Bolts won by 9 runs
Tribhuvan University International Cricket Ground, Kirtipur
Umpires: Prageeth Rambukwella (SL) and Kamlesh Thakur (Nep)
Player of the match: Trit Raj Das (Janakpur Bolts)

- Pokhara Avengers won the toss and elected to field.
- Bipin Acharya (Pokhara Avengers) made his T20 debut.
- Moeen Ali (Janakpur Bolts) took his 300th wicket in T20s.

Match 10
2 November 2026
12:30
Scorecard

Karnali Yaks; 180/6 (20 overs)	v	Kathmandu Gorkhas; 181/6 (19.4 overs)
Ariful Islam 44 (22); Karan KC 2/35 (4 overs)		Rashid Khan 50 (33); Hussain Talat 2/32 (4 overs)

Kathmandu Gorkhas won by 4 wickets
Tribhuvan University International Cricket Ground, Kirtipur
Umpires: Buddhi Pradhan (Nep) and Hiralal Raut (Nep)
Player of the match: Karan KC (Kathmandu Gorkhas)

- Kathmandu Gorkhas won the toss and elected to field.
- Dev Shah (Kathmandu Gorkhas) made his T20 debut.

Match 11
2 November 2026
17:00 (D/N)
Scorecard

Chitwan Rhinos; 129/6 (20 overs)	v	Sudurpaschim Royals; 131/5 (20 overs)
Ravi Bopara 49 (40); Scott Kuggeleijn 2/26 (4 overs)		Brandon McMullen 43 (21); Ranjit Kumar 3/28 (4 overs)

Sudurpaschim Royals won by 5 wickets
Tribhuvan University International Cricket Ground, Kirtipur
Umpires: Prageeth Rambukwella (SL) and Sanjay Sigdel (Nep)
Player of the match: Brandon McMullen (Sudurpaschim Royals)

- Sudurpaschim Royals won the toss and elected to field.
- Ravi Bopara (Chitwan Rhinos) scored his 10,000th run in T20s.

Match 12
3 November 2026
12:30
Scorecard

Biratnagar Kings; 174/3 (20 overs)	v	Janakpur Bolts; 172/7 (20 overs)
Imran Sheikh 56 (45); Abhisekh Tiwari 2/38 (4 overs)		Saif Hassan 71 (48); Andre Russell 4/45 (4 overs)

Biratnagar Kings won by 2 runs
Tribhuvan University International Cricket Ground, Kirtipur
Umpires: Himal Giri (Nep) and Gazi Sohel (Ban)
Player of the match: Andre Russell (Biratnagar Kings)

- Janakpur Bolts won the toss and elected to field.
- Aprajit Poudel (Biratnagar Kings) and Bishal Shusling (Janakpur Bolts) both made their T20 debuts.

Match 13
3 November 2026
17:00 (D/N)
Scorecard

Pokhara Avengers; 97/9 (20 overs)	v	Lumbini Lions; 98/2 (11.4 overs)
Chamika Karunaratne 25 (17); Ruben Trumpelmann 3/16 (4 overs)		Rohit Paudel 47* (32); Bipin Khatri 1/20 (2 overs)

Lumbini Lions won by 8 wickets
Tribhuvan University International Cricket Ground, Kirtipur
Umpires: Durga Subedi (Nep) and Masudur Rahman (Ban)
Player of the match: Ruben Trumpelmann (Lumbini Lions)

- Lumbini Lions won the toss and elected to field.
- Arjun Kumal (Pokhara Avengers) and Abhishesh Gautam (Lumbini Lions) both made their T20 debuts.

Match 14
5 November 2026
12:30
Scorecard

Lumbini Lions; 149/8 (20 overs)	v	Janakpur Bolts; 133/8 (20 overs)
Rohit Paudel 38 (31); Rahul Yadav 2/17 (2 overs)		Harmeet Singh 33 (20); D'Arcy Short 3/23 (4 overs)

Lumbini Lions won by 16 runs
Tribhuvan University International Cricket Ground, Kirtipur
Umpires: Durga Subedi (Nep) and Kamlesh Thakur (Nep)
Player of the match: Rohit Paudel (Lumbini Lions)

- Janakpur Bolts won the toss and elected to field.

Match 15
5 November 2026
17:00 (D/N)
Scorecard

Biratnagar Kings; 83 (18.3 overs)	v	Kathmandu Gorkhas; 86/1 (9.4 overs)
Rupesh Singh 26 (27); Santosh Yadav 3/11 (3 overs)		David Warner 44* (24); Aprajit Poudel 1/16 (2 overs)

Kathmandu Gorkhas won by 9 wickets
Tribhuvan University International Cricket Ground, Kirtipur
Umpires: Sanjay Gurung (Nep) and Gazi Sohel (Ban)
Player of the match: Santosh Yadav (Kathmandu Gorkhas)

- Kathmandu Gorkhas won the toss and elected to field.
- Sahil Patel (Kathmandu Gorkhas) made his T20 debut.

Match 16
6 November 2026
12:30
Scorecard

Sudurpaschim Royals; 176/6 (20 overs)	v	Karnali Yaks; 137/7 (20 overs)
Saif Zaib 35 (24); Mark Watt 2/27 (4 overs)		David Miller 93* (55); Scott Kuggeleijn 2/39 (4 overs)

Sudurpaschim Royals won by 39 runs
Tribhuvan University International Cricket Ground, Kirtipur
Umpires: Buddhi Pradhan (Nep) and Ram Kailash Yadav (Nep)
Player of the match: David Miller (Karnali Yaks)

- Karnali Yaks won the toss and elected to field.
- Surya Tamang (Karnali Yaks) made his T20 debut.

Match 17
6 November 2026
17:00 (D/N)
Scorecard

Chitwan Rhinos; 151/6 (20 overs)	v	Pokhara Avengers; 121 (19 overs)
Sikandar Raza 37 (16); Bipin Khatri 2/22 (4 overs)		Arjun Kumal 45 (44); Rijan Dhakal 4/24 (4 overs)

Chitwan Rhinos won by 30 runs
Tribhuvan University International Cricket Ground, Kirtipur
Umpires: Gazi Sohel (Ban) and Durga Subedi (Nep)
Player of the match: Rijan Dhakal (Chitwan Rhinos)

- Pokhara Avengers won the toss and elected to field.
- Sudip Aryal (Pokhara Avengers) made his T20 debut.

Match 18
7 November 2026
17:00 (D/N)
Scorecard

Kathmandu Gorkhas; 160/8 (20 overs)	v	Lumbini Lions; 124 (19.3 overs)
David Warner 66 (50); Abhishesh Gautam 2/15 (4 overs)		Sundeep Jora 44 (45); Jahandad Khan 4/23 (4 overs)

Kathmandu Gorkhas won by 36 runs
Tribhuvan University International Cricket Ground, Kirtipur
Umpires: Buddhi Pradhan (Nep) and Prageeth Rambukwella (SL)
Player of the match: David Warner (Kathmandu Gorkhas)

- Lumbini Lions won the toss and elected to field.

Match 19
9 November 2026
12:30
Scorecard

Pokhara Avengers; 217/3 (20 overs)	v	Karnali Yaks; 154 (18.3 overs)
Yuvraaj Samra 102 (48); Sompal Kami 2/24 (4 overs)		Pawan Sarraf 32 (21); Mahedi Hasan 3/24 (4 overs)

Pokhara Avengers won by 63 runs
Tribhuvan University International Cricket Ground, Kirtipur
Umpires: Prageeth Rambukwella (SL) and Durga Subedi (Nep)
Player of the match: Yuvraaj Samra (Pokhara Avengers)

- Pokhara Avengers won the toss and elected to bat.
- Sunny BK and Bibek Magar (Pokhara Avengers) both made their T20 debuts.

Match 20
9 November 2026
17:00 (D/N)
Scorecard

Kathmandu Gorkhas; 180/8 (20 overs)	v	Chitwan Rhinos; 170/7 (20 overs)
Rashid Khan 52 (30); Rijan Dhakal 3/14 (4 overs)		Ravi Bopara 55 (35); Sahan Arachchige 2/37 (4 overs)

Kathmandu Gorkhas won by 10 runs
Tribhuvan University International Cricket Ground, Kirtipur
Umpires: Sanjay Gurung (Nep) and Gazi Sohel (Ban)
Player of the match: Rashid Khan (Kathmandu Gorkhas)

- Chitwan Rhinos won the toss and elected to field.
- Ganesh Gautam (Kathmandu Gorkhas) made his T20 debut.

Match 21
10 November 2026
17:00 (D/N)
Scorecard

Sudurpaschim Royals; 120/9 (20 overs)	v	Janakpur Bolts; 93 (19.5 overs)
Brandon McMullen 33 (23); Harmeet Singh 4/17 (4 overs)		Trit Raj Das 21 (29); Scott Kuggeleijn 3/13 (4 overs)

Sudurpaschim Royals won by 27 runs
Tribhuvan University International Cricket Ground, Kirtipur
Umpires: Ram Pandey (Nep) and Masudur Rahman (Ban)
Player of the match: Scott Kuggeleijn (Sudurpaschim Royals)

- Sudurpaschim Royals won the toss and elected to bat.

Match 22
12 November 2026
12:30
Scorecard

Pokhara Avengers; 132 (17.5 overs)	v	Biratnagar Kings; 136/6 (19.2 overs)
Yuvraaj Samra 84 (47); Sandeep Lamichhane 6/27 (4 overs)		Basir Ahamad 37 (39); Kushal Bhurtel 2/21 (4 overs)

Biratnagar Kings won by 4 wickets
Tribhuvan University International Cricket Ground, Kirtipur
Umpires: Hem Raj Bhatta (Nep) and Prageeth Rambukwella (SL)
Player of the match: Sandeep Lamichhane (Biratnagar Kings)

- Pokhara Avengers won the toss and elected to bat.
- Sandeep Lamichhane (Biratnagar Kings) took the first hat-trick in his NPL career, overall third in NPL and the first in this season.

Match 23
12 November 2026
17:00 (D/N)
Scorecard

Karnali Yaks; 105 (19.2 overs)	v	Lumbini Lions; 107/6 (16.4 overs)
Sompal Kami 28 (18); Kishor Mahato 2/6 (2.2 overs)		D'Arcy Short 46 (34); Mark Watt 4/12 (4 overs)

Lumbini Lions won by 4 wickets
Tribhuvan University International Cricket Ground, Kirtipur
Umpires: Masudur Rahman (Ban) and Durga Subedi (Nep)
Player of the match: D'Arcy Short (Lumbini Lions)

- Karnali Yaks won the toss and elected to bat.
- Bipin Sharma and Dipendra Rawat (Karnali Yaks) both made their T20 debuts.

Match 24
13 November 2026
12:30
Scorecard

Sudurpaschim Royals; 125/6 (20 overs)	v	Kathmandu Gorkhas; 118/7 (20 overs)
Dipendra Singh Airee 60 (55); Jahandad Khan 3/22 (4 overs)		Rashid Khan 35* (31); Anil Kharel 2/18 (4 overs)

Sudurpaschim Royals won by 7 runs
Tribhuvan University International Cricket Ground, Kirtipur
Umpires: Ram Pandey (Nep) and Prageeth Rambukwella (SL)
Player of the match: Dipendra Singh Airee (Sudurpaschim Royals)

- Kathmandu Gorkhas won the toss and elected to field.
- Dipak Bohara (Sudurpaschim Royals) made his T20 debut.

Match 25
13 November 2026
17:00 (D/N)
Scorecard

Janakpur Bolts; 88/9 (20 overs)	v	Chitwan Rhinos; 92/6 (17.2 overs)
Harmeet Singh 25 (25); Ranjit Kumar 3/2 (3 overs)		Dawid Malan 35* (39); Rahul Yadav 3/19 (3 overs)

Chitwan Rhinos won by 4 wickets
Tribhuvan University International Cricket Ground, Kirtipur
Umpires: Sanjay Gurung (Nep) and Buddhi Pradhan (Nep)
Player of the match: Dawid Malan (Chitwan Rhinos)

- Janakpur Bolts won the toss and elected to bat.
- Santosh Karki (Jankapur Bolts) made his T20 debut.

Match 26
14 November 2026
17:00 (D/N)
Scorecard

Biratnagar Kings; 166/4 (20 overs)	v	Lumbini Lions; 168/6 (19.5 overs)
Charith Asalanka 64 (43); Kishor Mahato 2/24 (4 overs)		D'Arcy Short 45 (38); Aprajit Poudel 2/5 (1 over)

Lumbini Lions won by 4 wickets
Tribhuvan University International Cricket Ground, Kirtipur
Umpires: Gazi Sohel (Ban) and Durga Subedi (Nep)
Player of the match: Sundeep Jora (Lumbini Lions)

- Lumbini Lions won the toss and elected to field.

Match 27
15 November 2026
12:30
Scorecard

Karnali Yaks; 153/8 (20 overs)	v	Chitwan Rhinos; 129 (19.1 overs)
Hussain Talat 51* (33); Salahuddin Khan 2/19 (2 overs)		Usama Mir 28* (23); Hussain Talat 3/17 (3.1 overs)

Karnali Yaks won by 24 runs
Tribhuvan University International Cricket Ground, Kirtipur
Umpires: Ram Pandey (Nep) and Buddhi Pradhan (Nep)
Player of the match: Hussain Talat (Karnali Yaks)

- Karnali Yaks won the toss and elected to bat.
- Ashok Dhami, Salahuddin Khan (Chitwan Rhinos) and Sachin Sharma (Karnali Yaks) all made their T20 debuts.

Match 28
15 November 2026
17:00 (D/N)
Scorecard

Pokhara Avengers; 224/3 (20 overs)	v	Kathmandu Gorkhas; 129 (19.1 overs)
Kushal Bhurtel 99 (51); Karan KC 2/34 (4 overs)		Sahil Patel 34 (23); Dinesh Kharel 4/18 (4 overs)

Pokhara Avengers won by 55 runs
Tribhuvan University International Cricket Ground, Kirtipur
Umpires: Hem Raj Bhatta (Nep) and Sanjay Gurung (Nep)
Player of the match: Kushal Bhurtel (Pokhara Avengers)

- Kathmandu Gorkhas won the toss and elected to field.
- Sonu Devkota (Kathmandu Gorkhas) made his T20 debut.

== Playoffs ==
=== Bracket ===
Qualifier 1
17 November – Kirtipur
1	Lumbini Lions	108/4 (16.4 overs)
2	Sudurpaschim Royals	105/8 (20 overs)
Eliminator
18 November – Kirtipur
3	Kathmandu Gorkhas	143/9 (20 overs)
4	Chitwan Rhinos	204/4 (20 overs)

Qualifier 2
19 November – Kirtipur
Q1L	Sudurpaschim Royals	136/7 (19.5 overs)
EW	Chitwan Rhinos	133/9 (20 overs)

Final
21 November – Kirtipur
Q1W	Lumbini Lions	155/6 (20 overs)
Q2W	Sudurpaschim Royals	158/0 (13.3 overs)

=== Qualifier 1 ===
Qualifier 1
17 November 2026
17:00 (D/N)
Scorecard

Sudurpaschim Royals; 105/8 (20 overs)	v	Lumbini Lions; 108/4 (16.4 overs)
Dipendra Singh Airee 52 (51); Ruben Trumpelmann 2/14 (4 overs)		Niroshan Dickwella 59* (37); Tharindu Ratnayake 2/25 (4 overs)

Lumbini Lions won by 6 wickets
Tribhuvan University International Cricket Ground, Kirtipur
Umpires: Buddhi Pradhan (Nep) and Masudur Rahman (Ban)
Player of the match: Niroshan Dickwella (Lumbini Lions)

- Lumbini Lions won the toss and elected to field.

=== Eliminator ===
Eliminator
18 November 2026
17:00 (D/N)
Scorecard

Chitwan Rhinos; 204/4 (20 overs)	v	Kathmandu Gorkhas; 143/9 (20 overs)
Kamil Mishara 120* (59); Karan KC 2/32 (4 over)		William Bosisto 37 (28); Rijan Dhakal 4/16 (4 overs)

Chitwan Rhinos won by 61 runs
Tribhuvan University International Cricket Ground, Kirtipur
Umpires: Gazi Sohel (Ban) and Durga Subedi (Nep)
Player of the match: Kamil Mishara (Chitwan Rhinos)

- Chitwan Rhinos won the toss and elected to bat.

=== Qualifier 2 ===
Qualifier 2
19 November 2026
17:00 (D/N)
Scorecard

Chitwan Rhinos; 133/9 (20 overs)	v	Sudurpaschim Royals; 136/7 (19.5 overs)
Dawid Malan 71* (51); Scott Kuggeleijn 3/27 (4 overs)		Tharindu Rathnayake 53* (42); Ranjit Kumar 2/25 (3 overs)

Sudurpaschim Royals won by 3 wickets
Tribhuvan University International Cricket Ground, Kirtipur
Umpires: Buddhi Pradhan (Nep) and Prageeth Rambukwella (SL)
Player of the match: Tharindu Rathnayake (Sudurpaschim Royals)

- Chitwan Rhinos won the toss and elected to bat.

=== Final ===
Final
21 November 2026
17:00 (D/N)
Scorecard

Lumbini Lions; 155/6 (20 overs)	v	Sudurpaschim Royals; 158/0 (13.3 overs)
Dilip Nath 39* (31); Scott Kuggeleijn 2/25 (4 overs)		George Munsey 125* (54)

Sudurpaschim Royals won by 10 wickets
Tribhuvan University International Cricket Ground, Kirtipur
Umpires: Prageeth Rambukwella (SL) and Gazi Sohel (Ban)
Player of the match: George Munsey (Sudurpaschim Royals)

- Sudurpaschim Royals won the toss and elected to field.

== Statistics ==
Most runs
Runs	Player	Team
294	Yuvraaj Samra	Pokhara Avengers
242	Lokesh Bam	Biratnagar Kings
238	Ravi Bopara	Chitwan Rhinos
235	Kushal Bhurtel	Pokhara Avengers
220	Dawid Malan	Chitwan Rhinos

Most wickets
Wickets	Player	Team
17	Rijan Dhakal	Chitwan Rhinos
15	Scott Kuggeleijn	Sudurpaschim Royals
13	Kamal Singh Airee	Chitwan Rhinos
12	Rahul Yadav	Janakpur Bolts
12	Jahandad Khan	Kathmandu Gorkhas

== Individual awards ==
The major individual award winners of the 2026 Nepal Premier League were as follows.

Award	Winner	Team	Prize
Best Nepali Player	Rijan Dhakal	Chitwan Rhinos	Omoda car
Siddhartha Bank Player of the Tournament	Dipendra Singh Airee	Sudurpaschim Royals	NPR 500,000
Best Bowler	Rijan Dhakal	Chitwan Rhinos	Pulsar motorcycle
Best Batter	Lokesh Bam	Biratnagar Kings	Pulsar motorcycle
Emerging Player	Rahul Yadav	Janakpur Bolts	Pulsar motorcycle
Final Player of the Match	George Munsey	Sudurpaschim Royals	Player of the Match award

== Broadcasting ==
The Cricket Association of Nepal awarded the domestic television rights for the 2026 season to Himalaya Television Network and the worldwide television broadcast rights to Star Sports, while the worldwide over-the-top (OTT) streaming rights were awarded to NetTV (except for India). Meanwhile, FanCode secured the OTT streaming rights for India.

Country	TV	Streaming
Nepal	Himalaya Sports	NetTV
Nepal	Star Sports	NetTV
India	Star Sports	FanCode
Bangladesh	Star Sports	NetTV
Bhutan	Star Sports	NetTV
Sri Lanka	Star Sports	NetTV
Maldives	Star Sports	NetTV
Middle East	None	NetTV
Rest of the World	None	NetTV

== See also ==
- Nepal Premier League
- 2026 Nepal Premier League final
