= 2025 Nepal Premier League =

2nd edition of Nepal Premier League

2025 Nepal Premier League season
- Official Logo of 2025 NPL
- Dates: 17 November – 13 December 2025
- Administrator: Cricket Association of Nepal
- Cricket format: Twenty20
- Tournament format(s): Round-robin and playoffs
- Champions: Lumbini Lions (1st title)
- Runners-up: Sudurpaschim Royals
- Participants: 8
- Matches: 32
- Player of the series: Ruben Trumpelmann (Lumbini Lions)
- Most runs: Adam Rossington (Pokhara Avengers) (323)
- Most wickets: Sandeep Lamichhane (Biratnagar Kings) (17); Sher Malla (Lumbini Lions) (17); Abinash Bohara (Sudurpaschim Royals) (17)

The 2025 Nepal Premier League, also known as Siddhartha Bank NPL 2025 for sponsorship reasons, was the second season of the Nepal Premier League (NPL), a franchise Twenty20 cricket league in Nepal. The tournament featured eight teams competing in 32 matches from 17 November to 13 December 2025.

The defending champions Janakpur Bolts were eliminated in the league stage. In the final, Lumbini Lions defeated Sudurpaschim Royals by 6 wickets to win their maiden title. Adam Rossington (Pokhara Avengers) was the highest run-scorer in the tournament with 323 runs. Sandeep Lamichhane (Biratnagar Kings), along with Sher Malla (Lumbini Lions) and Abinash Bohara (Sudurpaschim Royals), picked up 17 wickets each, making them joint top wicket-takers. Ruben Trumpelmann of the Lumbini Lions was named the Player of the series.

== Background ==
The Nepal Premier League (NPL) is a men's T20 franchise cricket league organized by the Cricket Association of Nepal (CAN). It was established in 2024, with its inaugural season held in the same year. The league features eight city- or province-based franchises competing in a round-robin stage followed by the playoffs. Janakpur Bolts won the maiden title, defeating Sudurpaschim Royals in the final.

== Teams ==
Team	Captain	Head coach
Biratnagar Kings	Sandeep Lamichhane	Dhammika Prasad
Chitwan Rhinos	Kushal Malla	Kalam Ali
Janakpur Bolts	Wayne Parnell	Shivnarine Chanderpaul
Karnali Yaks	Sompal Kami	Gyanendra Malla
Kathmandu Gorkhas	Karan KC	Monty Desai
Lumbini Lions	Rohit Paudel	Tinu Yohannan
Pokhara Avengers	Kushal Bhurtel	Rajiv Kumar
Sudurpaschim Royals	Dipendra Singh Airee	Jagat Tamata

== Auction and personnel changes ==
The franchises were required to submit their retention lists before 5 July 2025, and a total of 51 players were retained ahead of the auction. The auction was held on 9 August 2025 in Kathmandu, Nepal. A total of 458 players registered for the auction, of which 150 players were shortlisted and 37 were sold.

Dev Khanal, Arjun Saud, Pawan Sarraf and Mohammad Aadil Alam became the most expensive players in the auction, bought at the price of रू15 lakh (US$10,000). Mohammad Aadil Alam had been upon by all eight franchises.

== Squads ==
The player auction took place on 9 August 2025.

Biratnagar Kings	Chitwan Rhinos	Janakpur Bolts	Karnali Yaks
Sandeep Lamichhane (c); Basir Ahamad; Lokesh Bam (wk); Subash Bhandari; Naren Bhatta; Marchant de Lange; Faf du Plessis; Martin Guptill; Pratish GC; Sam Heazlett; Shehan Jayasuriya; Shrawan Kisku; George Munsey; Ayush Neupane; Sahil Patel (wk); Shankar Rana; Shubham Ranjane; Surya Tamang	Kushal Malla (c); Bipin Acharya; Kamal Singh Airee; Deepak Bohara; Ravi Bopara; Rijan Dhakal; Saugat Dhakal; Gautam KC; Dev Khanal; Ranjeet Kumar; Dawid Malan; Alpesh Ramjani; Amar Rautela; Bipin Rawal (wk); Arjun Saud (wk); George Scrimshaw; Sohail Tanvir; Saif Zaib	Wayne Parnell (c); Bikash Aagri; Sachin Bhatta; Sangeeth Cooray; Shubh Kansakar; Sanjay Krishnamurthi; Jan Nicol Loftie-Eaton; Aaditya Mahata; Kishore Mahato; Lahiru Milantha (wk); Lalit Rajbanshi; Maaz Sadaqat; Lahiru Samarakoon; Anil Sah (wk); Aasif Sheikh (wk); Rupesh Singh; Tul Bahadur Thapa; Mayan Yadav; Pappu Yadav	Sompal Kami (c); Will Bosisto; Deepak Dumre (wk); Arjun Gharti (wk); Gulshan Jha; Yuvraj Khatri; Jaykishan Kolsawala (wk); Max O'Dowd; Priyank Panchal; Dipendra Rawat; Pawan Sarraf; Bipin Sharma; Imran Sheikh; Unish Thakuri; Manish Thapa (wk); Mark Watt; Nandan Yadav; Najibullah Zadran
Kathmandu Gorkhas	Lumbini Lions	Pokhara Avengers	Sudurpaschim Royals
Karan KC (c); Mohammad Aadil Alam; Shahab Alam; Ben Charlesworth; Sonu Devkota; Gerhard Erasmus; Dipesh Kandel; Milind Kumar; Rashid Khan; Uttam Magar (wk); Sunny Patel; Bhim Sharki; John Simpson (wk); ~~Natarjan Shah~~; Pratik Shrestha; Aakash Tripathi; Tul B Thapa; Ricardo Vasconcelos (wk); Santosh Yadav	Rohit Paudel (c); Dinesh Adhikari; Sameer Ali (wk); Tilak Bhandari; Niroshan Dickwella (wk); Thomas Draca; Abhishesh Gautam; Durgesh Gupta; Sundeep Jora; Aadil Khan (wk); Sumit Maharjan; Sher Malla; Gulbadin Naib; Dilip Nath (wk); Bishal Patel; D'Arcy Short; JJ Smit; Movin Subasingha; Ruben Trumpelmann; ~~Bibek Yadav~~	Kushal Bhurtel (c); Dawood Ahmadzai; Aakash Chand; Rohit Chand; Sandeep Chhetri; Rishi Dhawan; Trit Raj Das; Dan Douthwaite; Sagar Dhakal; Dinesh Kharel; Bipin Khatri; Arjun Kumal (wk); Dhananjaya Lakshan; Arjun Singh Nahal; James Neesham; Krishna Poudel; Jason Roy; Adam Rossington (wk); Matthew Taylor; Kiran Thagunna; Abhisekh Tiwari; Sumeet Verma	Dipendra Singh Airee (c); Mukhtar Ahmed; Abinash Bohara; Dipak Bohara (wk); Milan Bohara; Binod Bhandari (wk); Josh Brown; Hemant Dhami; Sheldon Jackson; Scott Kuggeleijn; Chris Lynn; Hikmat Mahar; Dhruv Parashar; Ishan Pandey; Tek Rawat (wk); Naren Saud; Aarif Sheikh; Harmeet Singh; Dipendra Thapa (wk)

Bibek Yadav was replaced by Sumit Maharjan in Lumbini Lions's squad due to injury.

Natarjan Shah was replaced by Sonu Devkota in Kathmandu Gorkhas's squad due to groin injury.

Anil Sah was removed from captain of Janakpur Bolts mid-season & Wayne Parnell was appointed as captain.

== Venue ==
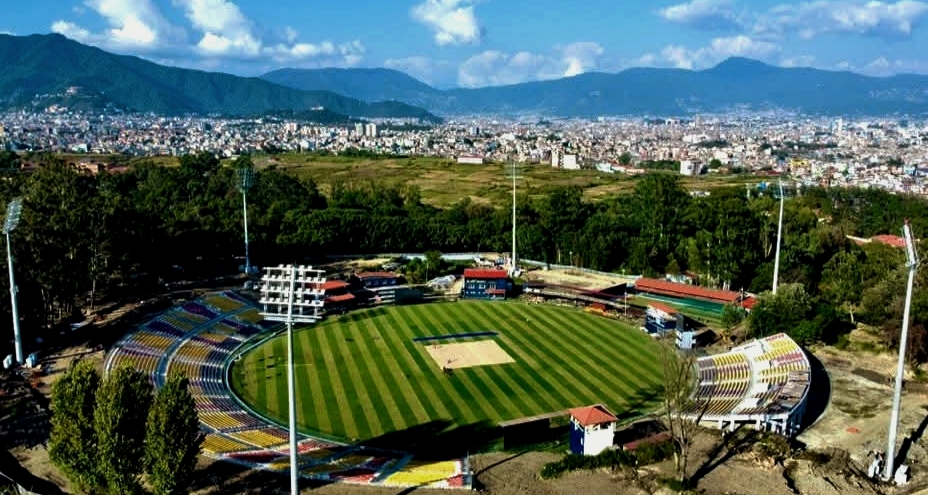
Tribhuvan University International Cricket Stadium, Kirtipur

All matches were played at the Tribhuvan University International Cricket Ground in Kirtipur, Kathmandu.

== Teams and standings ==
=== Points table ===
Pos	Team	Pld	W	L	NR	Pts	NRR	Qualification
1	Sudurpaschim Royals (R)	7	6	1	0	12	0.832	Advance to Qualifier 1
2	Biratnagar Kings (3rd)	7	5	2	0	10	0.680	Advance to Qualifier 1
3	Kathmandu Gorkhas (4th)	7	5	2	0	10	0.537	Advance to Eliminator
4	Lumbini Lions (C)	7	4	3	0	8	−0.394	Advance to Eliminator
5	Pokhara Avengers	7	3	4	0	6	−0.179	Eliminated
6	Karnali Yaks	7	2	5	0	4	−0.356	Eliminated
7	Chitwan Rhinos	7	2	5	0	4	−0.611	Eliminated
8	Janakpur Bolts	7	1	6	0	2	−0.443	Eliminated

Source: ESPNcricinfo
(C) Champions; (R) Runners-up

=== Match summary ===
Team	Group matches							Playoffs		
Team	1	2	3	4	5	6	7	Q1/E	Q2	F
Biratnagar Kings	2	4	6	6	8	8	10	L	L	
Chitwan Rhinos	2	2	4	4	4	4	4			
Janakpur Bolts	0	0	0	0	2	2	2			
Karnali Yaks	0	2	2	2	2	2	4			
Kathmandu Gorkhas	2	2	2	4	6	8	10	L		
Lumbini Lions	2	2	2	2	4	6	8	W	W	W
Pokhara Avengers	0	0	2	2	4	4	6			
Sudurpaschim Royals	2	4	6	8	10	12	12	W		L

Win	Loss	No result

- Note: The total points at the end of each group match are listed.
- Note: Click on the points (group matches) or W/L (playoffs) to see the match summary.

Visitor team →	BK	CR	JB	KY	KG	LL	PA	SR
Home team ↓	BK	CR	JB	KY	KG	LL	PA	SR
Biratnagar Kings		Chitwan; 48 runs				Lumbini; 5 wickets	Biratnagar; 53 runs	
Chitwan Rhinos				Chitwan; 4 wickets	Kathmandu; 53 runs		Pokhara; 8 wickets	
Janakpur Bolts	Biratnagar; 9 runs	Janakpur; 6 wickets			Kathmandu; 5 wickets		Pokhara; 25 runs	
Karnali Yaks	Biratnagar; 3 wickets		Karnali; 3 runs		Kathmandu; 5 wickets	Karnali; 9 wickets		
Kathmandu Gorkhas	Biratnagar; 5 wickets					Kathmandu; 21 runs		Sudurpaschim; 29 runs
Lumbini Lions		Lumbini; 6 wickets	Lumbini; 4 wickets					Sudurpaschim; 7 wickets
Pokhara Avengers				Pokhara; 34 runs	Kathmandu; 13 runs	Lumbini; 3 wickets		Sudurpaschim; 18 runs
Sudurpaschim Royals	Biratnagar; 6 wickets	Sudurpaschim; 49 runs	Sudurpaschim; 6 wickets	Sudurpaschim; 45 runs				

Home team won	Visitor team won

- Note: Results listed are according to the home (horizontal) and visitor (vertical) teams.
- Note: Click on a result to see a summary of the match.

== League stage ==
The fixture was released on 10 November 2025.

Match 1
17 November 2025
16:00 (D/N)
Scorecard

Janakpur Bolts; 130/6 (20 overs)	v	Kathmandu Gorkhas; 131/5 (18 overs)
Aasif Sheikh 54 (41); Milind Kumar 3/15 (4 overs)		Ben Charlesworth 46 (23); Sanjay Krishnamurthi 1/8 (1 over)

Kathmandu Gorkhas won by 5 wickets
Tribhuvan University International Cricket Ground, Kirtipur
Umpires: Buddhi Pradhan (Nep) and Raveendra Wimalasiri (SL)
Player of the match: Milind Kumar (Kathmandu Gorkhas)

- Kathmandu Gorkhas won the toss and elected to field.

Match 2
18 November 2025
11:45
Scorecard

Karnali Yaks; 166/3 (20 overs)	v	Chitwan Rhinos; 171/6 (19.1 overs)
Priyank Panchal 90 (48); Saif Zaib 1/15 (3 overs)		Ravi Bopara 52 (36); Sompal Kami 2/33 (4 overs)

Chitwan Rhinos won by 4 wickets
Tribhuvan University International Cricket Ground, Kirtipur
Umpires: Vinay Kumar Jha (Nep) and Prageeth Rambukwella (SL)
Player of the match: Ravi Bopara (Chitwan Rhinos)

- Chitwan Rhinos won the toss and elected to field.

Match 3
18 November 2025
16:00 (D/N)
Scorecard

Biratnagar Kings; 220/6 (20 overs)	v	Pokhara Avengers; 167 (18.5 overs)
Lokesh Bam 72 (48); Matthew Taylor 2/48 (4 overs)		Kushal Bhurtel 59 (31); Sandeep Lamichhane 2/18 (4 overs)

Biratnagar Kings won by 53 runs
Tribhuvan University International Cricket Ground, Kirtipur
Umpires: Buddhi Pradhan (Nep) and Raveendra Wimalasiri (SL)
Player of the match: Lokesh Bam (Biratnagar Kings)

- Pokhara Avengers won the toss and elected to field.

Match 4
19 November 2025
16:00 (D/N)
Scorecard

Sudurpaschim Royals; 147 (20 overs)	v	Kathmandu Gorkhas; 118 (16.5 overs)
Harmeet Singh 53 (20); Karan KC 3/30 (4 overs)		Aakash Tripathi 34 (30); Scott Kuggeleijn 2/18 (3 overs)

Sudurpaschim Royals won by 29 runs
Tribhuvan University International Cricket Ground, Kirtipur
Umpires: Vinay Kumar Jha (Nep) and Prageeth Rambukwella (SL)
Player of the match: Harmeet Singh (Sudurpaschim Royals)

- Kathmandu Gorkhas won the toss and elected to field.

Match 5
20 November 2025
16:00 (D/N)
Scorecard

Chitwan Rhinos; 142/7 (20 overs)	v	Lumbini Lions; 146/4 (18.3 overs)
Ravi Bopara 66 (55); Ruben Trumpelmann 3/23 (4 overs)		Gulbadin Naib 44* (24); Rijan Dhakal 2/17 (3 overs)

Lumbini Lions won by 6 wickets
Tribhuvan University International Cricket Ground, Kirtipur
Umpires: Durga Subedi (Nep) and Raveendra Wimalasiri (SL)
Player of the match: Ruben Trumpelmann (Lumbini Lions)

- Lumbini Lions won the toss and elected to field.

Match 6
21 November 2025
16:00 (D/N)
Scorecard

Sudurpaschim Royals; 193/7 (20 overs)	v	Pokhara Avengers; 175/8 (20 overs)
Josh Brown 68 (35); James Neesham 3/47 (4 overs)		Kushal Bhurtel 53 (32); Harmeet Singh 2/22 (4 overs)

Sudurpaschim Royals won by 18 runs
Tribhuvan University International Cricket Ground, Kirtipur
Umpires: Prageeth Rambukwella (SL) and Durga Subedi (Nep)
Player of the match: Josh Brown (Sudurpaschim Royals)

- Pokhara Avengers won the toss and elected to field.

Match 7
22 November 2025
11:15
Scorecard

Lumbini Lions; 156/8 (20 overs)	v	Karnali Yaks; 161/1 (12.2 overs)
Rohit Paudel 49 (43); Nandan Yadav 2/21 (3 overs)		Mark Watt 114* (44); Sher Malla 1/29 (3 overs)

Karnali Yaks won by 9 wickets
Tribhuvan University International Cricket Ground, Kirtipur
Umpires: Durga Subedi (Nep) and Raveendra Wimalasiri (SL)
Player of the match: Mark Watt (Karnali Yaks)

- Karnali Yaks won the toss and elected to field.

Match 8
22 November 2025
15:30 (D/N)
Scorecard

Kathmandu Gorkhas; 134/6 (20 overs)	v	Biratnagar Kings; 135/5 (17.1 overs)
Mohammad Aadil Alam 48* (25); Marchant de Lange 2/17 (4 overs)		George Munsey 36 (16); Shahab Alam 2/19 (4 overs)

Biratnagar Kings won by 5 wickets
Tribhuvan University International Cricket Ground, Kirtipur
Umpires: Buddhi Pradhan (Nep) and Prageeth Rambukwella (SL)
Player of the match: Marchant de Lange (Biratnagar Kings)

- Biratnagar Kings won the toss and elected to field.

Match 9
24 November 2025
11:45
Scorecard

Biratnagar Kings; 135/7 (20 overs)	v	Janakpur Bolts; 126/9 (20 overs)
Shubham Ranjane 37(29); Rupesh Singh 2/12 (2 overs)		Nicol Loftie-Eaton 41(30); Sandeep Lamichhane 4/11 (4 overs)

Biratnagar Kings won by 9 runs
Tribhuvan University International Cricket Ground, Kirtipur
Umpires: Durga Subedi (Nep) and Raveendra Wimalasiri (SL)
Player of the match: Sandeep Lamichhane (Biratnagar Kings)

- Janakpur Bolts won the toss and elected to field.

Match 10
24 November 2025
16:00 (D/N)
Scorecard

Sudurpaschim Royals; 139/9 (20 overs)	v	Karnali Yaks; 94 (19.2 overs)
Dipendra Singh Airee 39(28); Sompal Kami 3/32 (4 overs)		Pawan Sarraf 27(26); Dipendra Singh Airee 4/23 (4 overs)

Sudurpaschim Royals won by 45 runs
Tribhuvan University International Cricket Ground, Kirtipur
Umpires: Buddhi Pradhan (Nep) and Raveendra Wimalasiri (SL)
Player of the match: Dipendra Singh Airee (Sudurpaschim Royals)

- Karnali Yaks won the toss and elected to field.

Match 11
25 November 2025
16:00 (D/N)
Scorecard

Kathmandu Gorkhas; 157/8 (20 overs)	v	Lumbini Lions; 135 (19.1 overs)
Karan KC 34(11); Gulbadin Naib 2/20 (3 overs)		Sher Malla 27(18); Milind Kumar 2/18 (4 overs)

Kathmandu Gorkhas won by 22 runs
Tribhuvan University International Cricket Ground, Kirtipur
Umpires: Buddhi Pradhan (Nep) and Vinay Kumar Jha (Nep)
Player of the match: Karan KC (Kathmandu Gorkhas)

- Lumbini Lions won the toss and elected to field.

Match 12
26 November 2025
16:00 (D/N)
Scorecard

Chitwan Rhinos; 174/5 (20 overs)	v	Biratnagar Kings; 126 (16.5 overs)
Ravi Bopara 65 (38); Sandeep Lamichhane 2/24 (4 overs)		Marchant de Lange 39 (22); Ranjit Kumar 5/21 (4 overs)

Chitwan Rhinos won by 48 runs
Tribhuvan University International Cricket Ground, Kirtipur
Umpires: Prageeth Rambukwella (SL) and Raveendra Wimalasiri (SL)
Player of the match: Ranjit Kumar (Chitwan Rhinos)

- Biratnagar won the toss and elected to field.

Match 13
27 November 2025
11:45
Scorecard

Lumbini Lions; 143 (19.4 overs)	v	Sudurpaschim Royals; 145/3 (18.2 overs)
Rohit Paudel 35 (36); Harmeet Singh 3/22 (3.4 overs)		Binod Bhandari 69* (49); Tilak Bhandari 1/8 (1 over)

Sudurpaschim Royals won by 7 wickets
Tribhuvan University International Cricket Ground, Kirtipur
Umpires: Durga Subedi (Nep) and Raveendra Wimalasiri (SL)
Player of the match: Binod Bhandari (Sudurpaschim Royals)

- Sudurpaschim Royals won the toss and elected to field.

Match 14
27 November 2025
16:00 (D/N)
Scorecard

Pokhara Avengers; 155 (20 overs)	v	Janakpur Bolts; 130/8 (20 overs)
Sumeet Verma 50* (29); Sanjay Krishnamurthi 3/21 (4 overs)		Wayne Parnell 50* (38); Bipin Khatri 4/15 (4 overs)

Pokhara Avengers won by 25 runs
Tribhuvan University International Cricket Ground, Kirtipur
Umpires: Buddhi Pradhan (Nep) and Prageeth Rambukwella (SL)
Player of the match: Sumeet Verma (Pokhara Avengers)

- Pokhara Avengers won the toss and elected to bat.

Match 15
28 November 2025
11:45
Scorecard

Kathmandu Gorkhas; 142 (19.4 overs)	v	Chitwan Rhinos; 89 (17.2 overs)
John Simpson 60 (29); Sohail Tanvir 4/25 (4 overs)		Dev Khanal 21 (18); Rashid Khan 2/3 (1.2 overs)

Kathmandu Gorkhas won by 53 runs
Tribhuvan University International Cricket Ground, Kirtipur
Umpires: Buddhi Pradhan (Nep) and Raveendra Wimalasiri (SL)
Player of the match: John Simpson (Kathmandu Gorkhas)

- Chitwan Rhinos won the toss and elected to field.

Match 16
28 November 2025
16:00 (D/N)
Scorecard

Karnali Yaks; 160/3 (20 overs)	v	Biratnagar Kings; 163/7 (19.5 overs)
Priyank Panchal 63 (47); Sandeep Lamichhane 1/24 (4 overs)		Basir Ahamad 62* (43); Gulshan Jha 2/20 (3 overs)

Biratnagar Kings won by 3 wickets
Tribhuvan University International Cricket Ground, Kirtipur
Umpires: Prageeth Rambukwella (SL) and Durga Subedi (Nep)
Player of the match: Basir Ahamad (Biratnagar Kings)

- Karnali Yaks won the toss and elected to bat.

Match 17
29 November 2025
11:15
Scorecard

Pokhara Avengers; 150/5 (20 overs)	v	Lumbini Lions; 151/7 (19.4 overs)
Adam Rossington 81 (63); Sher Malla 2/23 (4 overs)		Rohit Paudel 40 (36); Matthew Taylor 2/24 (3.4 overs)

Lumbini Lions won by 3 wickets
Tribhuvan University International Cricket Ground, Kirtipur
Umpires: Buddhi Pradhan (Nep) and Prageeth Rambukwella (SL)
Player of the match: Rohit Paudel (Lumbini Lions)

- Lumbini Lions won the toss and elected to field.

Match 18
29 November 2025
15:30 (D/N)
Scorecard

Janakpur Bolts; 145/8 (20 overs)	v	Sudurpaschim Royals; 148/4 (17.4 overs)
Sanjay Krishnamurthi 50 (38); Abinash Bohara 4/30 (4 overs)		Ishan Pandey 56 (35); Maaz Sadaqat 2/25 (4 overs)

Sudurpaschim Royals won by 6 wickets
Tribhuvan University International Cricket Ground, Kirtipur
Umpires: Durga Subedi (Nep) and Raveendra Wimalasiri (SL)
Player of the match: Ishan Pandey (Sudurpaschim Royals)

- Janakpur Bolts won the toss and elected to bat.

Match 19
30 November 2025
15:30 (D/N)
Scorecard

Karnali Yaks; 149/7 (20 overs)	v	Kathmandu Gorkhas; 155/5 (18 overs)
Gulshan Jha 49* (22); Rashid Khan 2/37 (4 overs)		Gerhard Erasmus 43* (33); Nandan Yadav 3/35 (4 overs)

Kathmandu Gorkhas won by 5 wickets
Tribhuvan University International Cricket Ground, Kirtipur
Umpires: Prageeth Rambukwella (SL) and Raveendra Wimalasiri (SL)
Player of the match: Gerhard Erasmus (Kathmandu Gorkhas)

- Karnali Yaks won the toss and elected to bat.

Match 20
2 December 2025
11:45
Scorecard

Chitwan Rhinos; 176/4 (20 overs)	v	Janakpur Bolts; 180/4 (17.3 overs)
Dawid Malan 80 (54); Jan Nicol Loftie-Eaton 1/17 (2 overs)		Maaz Sadaqat 63 (30); Amar Routela 1/19 (2 overs)

Janakpur Bolts won by 6 wickets
Tribhuvan University International Cricket Ground, Kirtipur
Umpires: Buddhi Pradhan (Nep) and Raveendra Wimalasiri (SL)
Player of the match: Anil Sah (Janakpur Bolts)

- Chitwan Rhinos won the toss and elected to bat.

Match 21
2 December 2025
16:00 (D/N)
Scorecard

Pokhara Avengers; 201/2 (20 overs)	v	Karnali Yaks; 167 (19 overs)
Adam Rossington 108 (58); Mark Watt 1/24 (3 overs)		Mark Watt 59 (34); Dhananjaya Lakshan 3/31 (4 overs)

Pokhara Avengers won by 34 runs
Tribhuvan University International Cricket Ground, Kirtipur
Umpires: Lyndon Hannibal (SL) and Prageeth Rambukwella (SL)
Player of the match: Adam Rossington (Pokhara Avengers)

- Karnali Yaks won the toss and elected to field.

Match 22
3 December 2025
16:00 (D/N)
Scorecard

Biratnagar Kings; 144/8 (20 overs)	v	Lumbini Lions; 145/5 (17.4 overs)
Lokesh Bam 35 (42); Sher Malla 3/25 (4 overs)		D'Arcy Short 57 (44); Sandeep Lamichhane 2/20 (4 overs)

Lumbini Lions won by 5 wickets
Tribhuvan University International Cricket Ground, Kirtipur
Umpires: Prageeth Rambukwella (SL) and Raveendra Wimalasiri (SL)
Player of the match: Sher Malla (Lumbini Lions)

- Lumbini Lions won the toss and elected to field.

Match 23
4 December 2025
11:45
Scorecard

Kathmandu Gorkhas; 165/8 (20 overs)	v	Pokhara Avengers; 152 (20 overs)
Ben Charlesworth 64 (55); Dhananjaya Lakshan 4/16 (4 overs)		Rishi Dhawan 54 (31); Shahab Alam 6/25 (4 overs)

Kathmandu Gorkhas won by 13 runs
Tribhuvan University International Cricket Ground, Kirtipur
Umpires: Buddhi Pradhan (Nep) and Prageeth Rambukwella (SL)
Player of the match: Bhim Sharki (Kathmandu Gorkhas)

- Pokhara Avengers won the toss and elected to field.
- Shahab Alam (Kathmandu Gorkhas) took the first hat-trick in his NPL career, overall first in NPL and the first in this season.

Match 24
4 December 2025
16:00 (D/N)
Scorecard

Sudurpaschim Royals; 169/4 (20 overs)	v	Chitwan Rhinos; 120 (17.1 overs)
Chris Lynn 75 (56); Saif Zaib 2/35 (4 overs)		Ravi Bopara 29 (23); Puneet Mehra 3/14 (2.1 overs)

Sudurpaschim Royals won by 49 runs
Tribhuvan University International Cricket Ground, Kirtipur
Umpires: Lyndon Hannibal (SL) and Durga Subedi (Nep)
Player of the match: Chris Lynn (Sudurpaschim Royals)

- Chitwan Rhinos won the toss and elected to field.

Match 25
5 December 2025
16:00 (D/N)
Scorecard

Janakpur Bolts; 132/6 (20 overs)	v	Lumbini Lions; 136/6 (19.1 overs)
Sangeeth Cooray 45 (38); Sher Malla 2/20 (4 overs)		Rohit Paudel 45 (38); Sangeeth Cooray 3/25 (4 overs)

Lumbini Lions won by 4 wickets
Tribhuvan University International Cricket Ground, Kirtipur
Umpires: Prageeth Rambukwella (SL) and Raveendra Wimalasiri (SL)
Player of the match: Rohit Paudel (Lumbini Lions)

- Janakpur Bolts won the toss and elected to bat.

Match 26
6 December 2025
11:15
Scorecard

Sudurpaschim Royals; 147/6 (20 overs)	v	Biratnagar Kings; 150/4 (11.5 overs)
Aarif Sheikh 45* (32); Sandeep Lamichhane 3/20 (4 overs)		Sam Heazlett 51 (27); Abinash Bohara 2/38 (2.5 overs)

Biratnagar Kings won by 6 wickets
Tribhuvan University International Cricket Ground, Kirtipur
Umpires: Lyndon Hannibal (SL) and Raveendra Wimalasiri (SL)
Player of the match: Faf du Plessis (Biratnagar Kings)

- Biratnagar Kings won the toss and elected to field.

Match 27
6 December 2025
15:30 (D/N)
Scorecard

Chitwan Rhinos; 120/6 (20 overs)	v	Pokhara Avengers; 121/2 (20 overs)
Dev Khanal 35 (41); Dhananjaya Lakshan 3/20 (3.4 overs)		Adam Rossington 65 (48); Rijan Dhakal 1/37 (3.4 overs)

Pokhara Avengers won by 8 wickets
Tribhuvan University International Cricket Ground, Kirtipur
Umpires: Buddhi Pradhan (Nep) and Durga Subedi (Nep)
Player of the match: Adam Rossington (Pokhara Avengers)

- Chitwan Rhinos won the toss and elected to bat.

Match 28
7 December 2025
15:30 (D/N)
Scorecard

Karnali Yaks; 129/9 (20 overs)	v	Janakpur Bolts; 126/7 (20 overs)
Imran Sheikh 33 (32); Aaditya Mahata 2/9 (1 over)		Sanjay Krishnamurthi 51 (39); Will Bosisto 2/18 (4 overs)

Karnali Yaks won by 3 runs
Tribhuvan University International Cricket Ground, Kirtipur
Umpires: Vinay Kumar Jha (Nep) and Durga Subedi (Nep)
Player of the match: Will Bosisto (Karnali Yaks)

- Janakpur Bolts won the toss and elected to field.

== Playoffs ==
=== Bracket ===
Qualifier 1
9 December 2025 – Kirtipur
1	Sudurpaschim Royals	155/7 (20 overs)
2	Biratnagar Kings	78 (14.1 overs)
Eliminator
10 December 2025 – Kirtipur
3	Kathmandu Gorkhas	111 (19.1 overs)
4	Lumbini Lions	112/6 (17.2 overs)

Qualifier 2
11 December 2025 – Kirtipur
Q1L	Biratnagar Kings	94 (17.5 overs)
EW	Lumbini Lions	134/8 (20 overs)

Final
13 December 2025 – Kirtipur
Q1W	Sudurpaschim Royals	85 (19.1 overs)
Q2W	Lumbini Lions	86/4 (9 overs)

=== Qualifier 1 ===
Qualifier 1
9 December 2025
16:00 (D/N)
Scorecard

Sudurpaschim Royals; 155/7 (20 overs)	v	Biratnagar Kings; 78 (14.1 overs)
Binod Bhandari 63 (52); Marchant de Lange 2/23 (4 overs)		Faf du Plessis 36 (29); Scott Kuggeleijn 2/9 (3 overs)

Sudurpaschim Royals won by 77 runs
Tribhuvan University International Cricket Ground, Kirtipur
Umpires: Lyndon Hannibal (SL) and Raveendra Wimalasiri (SL)
Player of the match: Binod Bhandari (Sudurpaschim Royals)

- Biratnagar Kings won the toss and elected to field.

=== Eliminator ===
Eliminator
10 December 2025
16:00 (D/N)
Scorecard

Kathmandu Gorkhas; 111 (19.1 overs)	v	Lumbini Lions; 112/6 (17.4 overs)
Santosh Yadav 23 (17); Sher Malla 3/22 (4 overs)		D'Arcy Short 33 (34); Santosh Yadav 2/17 (2 overs)

Lumbini Lions won by 4 wickets
Tribhuvan University International Cricket Ground, Kirtipur
Umpires: Lyndon Hannibal (SL) and Buddhi Pradhan (Nep)
Player of the match: Sher Malla (Lumbini Lions)

- Kathmandu Gorkhas won the toss and elected to bat.

=== Qualifier 2 ===
Qualifier 2
11 December 2025
16:00 (D/N)
Scorecard

Lumbini Lions; 134/8 (20 overs)	v	Biratnagar Kings; 94 (17.5 overs)
D'Arcy Short 45 (41); Subash Bhandari 3/14 (4 overs)		Sam Heazlett 34 (28); Tilak Bhandari 3/15 (4 overs)

Lumbini Lions won by 40 runs
Tribhuvan University International Cricket Ground, Kirtipur
Umpires: Lyndon Hannibal (SL) and Raveendra Wimalasiri (SL)
Player of the match: Tilak Bhandari (Lumbini Lions)

- Biratnagar Kings won the toss and elected to field.

== Final ==
2025 Nepal Premier League final
- Event: 2025 Nepal Premier League
Sudurpaschim Royals	Lumbini Lions
85	86/4
19.1 overs	9 overs
- Lumbini Lions won by 6 wickets
- Date: 13 December 2025
- Venue: Tribhuvan University International Cricket Ground, Kirtipur
- Player of the match: Ruben Trumpelmann (LL)
- Umpires: Lyndon Hannibal (SL); Raveendra Wimalasiri (SL)

The 2025 Nepal Premier League final was played on 13 December 2025 at the Tribhuvan University International Cricket Ground in Kirtipur. It was the final match of the second season of the Nepal Premier League. Lumbini Lions defeated Sudurpaschim Royals by six wickets to win their maiden Nepal Premier League title.

Sudurpaschim Royals qualified for the final after finishing at the top of the league stage and winning Qualifier 1. Lumbini Lions reached the final after winning Qualifier 2.

After winning the toss, Sudurpaschim Royals elected to bat first but were bowled out for 85 runs in 19.1 overs. Lumbini Lions chased the target comfortably, reaching 86 runs for the loss of four wickets in just 9 overs. Ruben Trumpelmann was named the player of the match for his decisive bowling performance.

=== Road to the final ===
Sudurpaschim Royals had a successful league stage with only 1 loss against Biratnagar Kings. They won the rest 6 matches garnering a total of 12 points finishing atop the league table. They defeated Biratnagar Kings in Qualifier 1 to gain their place in the Final.

Lumbini Lions finished fourth in the league table winning 4 games and losing 3 games against Sudurpaschim Royals, Karnali Yaks and kathmandu Gorkhas to end with a total of 8 points. Lumbini Lions began the tournament with three consecutive losses but recovered with three straight league-stage wins to reach the playoffs. They then maintained their momentum by winning the Eliminator, Qualifier 2, and the final.

Sudurpaschim Royals
vs
Lumbini Lions
League Stage
Opponent
Scorecard
Result
Points
Match No.
Opponent
Scorecard
Result
Points
Kathmandu Gorkhas
19 November 2025
Won
2
1
Chitwan Rhinos
20 November 2025
Won
2
Pokhara Avengers
21 November 2025
Won
4
2
Karnali Yaks
22 November 2025
Lost
2
Karnali Yaks
24 November 2025
Won
6
3
Kathmandu Gorkhas
25 November 2025
Lost
2
Lumbini Lions
27 November 2025
Won
8
4
Sudurpaschim Royals
27 November 2025
Lost
2
Janakpur Bolts
29 November 2025
Won
10
5
Pokhara Avengers
29 November 2025
Won
4
Chitwan Rhinos
4 December 2025
Won
12
6
Biratnagar Kings
3 December 2025
Won
6
Biratnagar Kings
6 December 2025
Lost
12
7
Janakpur Bolts
5 December 2025
Won
8
Playoff stage

Qualifier 1
9 December 2025 – Kirtipur
1	Sudurpaschim Royals	155/7 (20 overs)
2	Biratnagar Kings	78 (14.1 overs)
Eliminator
10 December 2025 – Kirtipur
3	Kathmandu Gorkhas	111 (19.1 overs)
4	Lumbini Lions	112/6 (17.2 overs)

Qualifier 2
11 December 2025 – Kirtipur
Q1L	Biratnagar Kings	94 (17.5 overs)
EW	Lumbini Lions	134/8 (20 overs)

Final
13 December 2025 – Kirtipur
Q1W	Sudurpaschim Royals	85 (19.1 overs)
Q2W	Lumbini Lions	86/4 (9 overs)

Opponent
Scorecard
Result

Opponent
Scorecard
Result
Biratnagar Kings
9 December 2025
Won
Q1
Kathmandu Gorkhas
10 December 2025
Won
Qualified for the finals
Q2
Biratnagar Kings
11 December 2025
Won
2025 Nepal Premier League final

=== Match officials ===
- On-field umpires: Lyndon Hannibal (SL) and Raveendra Wimalasiri (SL)
- Third umpire: Prageeth Rambukwella (SL)
- Reserve umpire: Ram Pandey (Nep)
- Match referee: Manu Nayyar (Ind)
- Toss: Sudurpaschim Royals won the toss and elected to bat.

=== Summary ===
Final
13 December 2025
15:30 (D/N)
Scorecard

Sudurpaschim Royals; 85 (19.1 overs)	v	Lumbini Lions; 86/4 (9 overs)
Ishan Pandey 33 (51); Ruben Trumpelmann 3/3 (2.1 overs)		Dinesh Adhikari 42 (13); Hemant Dhami 2/9 (1 overs)

Lumbini Lions won by 6 wickets
Tribhuvan University International Cricket Ground, Kirtipur
Umpires: Lyndon Hannibal (SL) and Raveendra Wimalasiri (SL)
Player of the match: Ruben Trumpelmann (Lumbini Lions)

- Sudurpaschim Royals won the toss and elected to bat.
- Rohit Paudel (Lumbini Lions) took the first hat-trick in his NPL career, overall second in NPL and the second in this season.

=== Sudurpaschim Royals innings ===
Sudurpaschim Royals (SR) won the toss and elected to bat, but their innings was largely defined by the struggle of their top order. Ishan Pandey was the standout performer and the best batter for the side, anchoring the innings with a gritty 33 runs off 51 balls. While the rest of the team faltered around him, Pandey's patience provided the only stability in an otherwise collapsing batting lineup, though his strike rate remained low due to the constant fall of wickets at the other end.

The rest of the batting unit struggled to find any momentum against the Lions' disciplined pace and spin. Captain Dipendra Singh Airee managed to score 13 runs before his dismissal, while Harmeet Singh and Scott Kuggeleijn were the only other players to reach double figures, contributing 10 runs each. The remaining batters, including Deepak Bohara, Puneet Mehra, and the lower order, failed to resist, with several falling for ducks or single-digit scores, leading to a total of 85 runs in 19.1 overs.

The Lumbini Lions' bowling attack was led by a masterful performance from captain Rohit Paudel, who turned the game with a historic hat-trick, finishing with figures of 3 wickets for just 12 runs. He was brilliantly supported by Scottish international Ruben Trumpelmann, who delivered one of the most economical spells in NPL history, taking 3 wickets for a mere 3 runs in 3.1 overs. Sher Malla also dismantled the lower order, claiming 3 wickets for 18 runs, as the Lions' bowlers combined to concede only 5 extras throughout the innings.

=== Lumbini Lions innings ===
Chasing a target of 86, the Lumbini Lions (LL) innings was dominated by the explosive batting of Dinesh Adhikari, who was the best batter of the chase. Adhikari demoralized the Royals' defense in the very first over, hitting four sixes against Dipendra Singh Airee to collect 27 runs. He played a match-winning cameo of 42 runs off only 13 balls, striking at over 300, which ensured that the required run rate remained negligible for the remainder of the match.

The middle order followed Adhikari's aggressive lead to finish the game quickly. Opener D'Arcy Short scored a brisk 14 runs off 11 balls before being caught, while captain Rohit Paudel contributed a steady 16 runs off 12 balls, including two fours and a towering six. Wicket-keeper Niroshan Dickwella remained not out on 11 runs, steering the team past the finish line in just 9.0 overs. Despite losing 4 wickets in the pursuit of quick runs, the Lions' batters stayed ahead of the game at every stage.

The Sudurpaschim Royals' bowling attack struggled to contain the early onslaught, though Hemant Dhami emerged as their most effective bowler, taking 2 wickets for 22 runs in his 2-over spell. Abinash Bohara managed to pick up 1 wicket while conceding 18 runs, and captain Dipendra Singh Airee claimed 1 wicket for 31 runs after his expensive opening over. Ultimately, the bowlers had too few runs to defend, as the Lions reached 89/4 to secure a 6-wicket victory and the 2025 NPL title.

=== Scorecard ===
Source: ESPNcricinfo

1st innings

Sudurpaschim Royals innings
Player	Status	Runs	Balls	4s	6s	Strike rate
Ishan Pandey	c Subasingha b Malla	33	51	1	0	64.71
Binod Bhandari	c Adhikari b Trumpelmann	0	2	0	0	0.00
Sheldon Jackson	lbw b Trumpelmann	1	3	0	0	33.33
Aarif Sheikh	lbw b Malla	6	6	1	0	100.00
Dipendra Singh Airee	c Trumpelmann b Paudel	13	20	0	1	65.00
Deepak Bohara	c Jora b Paudel	0	1	0	0	0.00
Puneet Mehra	lbw b Paudel	0	1	0	0	0.00
Harmeet Singh	c Short b Malla	10	11	0	1	90.91
Scott Kuggeleijn	c Jora b Bhandari	10	8	0	1	125.00
Hemant Dhami	not out	7	9	0	1	77.78
Abinash Bohara	c Short b Trumpelmann	1	3	0	0	33.33
Extras 4 (lb 1, w 3); Total 85 (19.1 overs)				2	4	4.43 RR

Fall of wickets: 1-1 (Binod Bhandari, 0.6 ov), 2-7 (Sheldon Jackson, 2.3 ov), 3-19 (Aarif Sheikh, 4.3 ov), 4-44 (Dipendra Singh Airee, 10.4 ov), 5-44 (Deepak Bohara, 10.5 ov), 6-44 (Puneet Mehra, 10.6 ov), 7-62 (Harmeet Singh, 14.4 ov), 8-71 (Ishan Pandey, 16.3 ov), 9-84 (Scott Kuggeleijn, 18.3 ov), 10-85 (Abinash Bohara, 19.1 ov)

Lumbini Lions bowling
Bowler	Overs	Maidens	Runs	Wickets	Econ	Wides	NBs
Ruben Trumpelmann	2.1	0	3	3	1.38	0	0
Sher Malla	4	0	18	3	4.50	0	0
Abhishesh Gautam	3	0	15	0	5.00	2	0
Rohit Paudel	4	0	12	3	3.00	1	0
Tilak Bhandari	4	0	26	1	6.50	0	0
Movin Subasingha	2	0	10	0	5.00	0	0

2nd innings

Lumbini Lions innings
Player	Status	Runs	Balls	4s	6s	Strike rate
Dinesh Adhikari	c Kuggeleijn b Dhami	42	13	1	5	323.07
D'Arcy Short	b Dhami	14	13	3	0	107.69
Niroshan Dickwella	not out	11	12	1	0	91.66
Rohit Paudel	c Airee b A Bohara	16	12	2	1	133.33
Sundeep Jora	c A Bohara b Airee	0	3	0	0	0.00
Dilip Nath	not out	1	1	0	0	100.00
Extras 2 (lb 1, w 1); Total 86/4 (9 overs)				7	6	9.55 RR

Fall of wickets: 1-58 (D'Arcy Short, 4.1 ov), 2-59 (Dinesh Adhikari, 4.3 ov), 3-84 (Rohit Paudel, 7.5 ov), 4-85 (Sundeep Jora, 8.5 ov)

Sudurpaschim Royals bowling
Bowler	Overs	Maidens	Runs	Wickets	Econ	Wides	NBs
Dipendra Singh Airee	2	0	29	1	14.50	1	0
Scott Kuggeleijn	2	0	22	0	11.00	0	0
Harmeet Singh	2	0	13	0	6.50	0	0
Hemant Dhami	1	0	9	2	9.00	0	0
Ishan Pandey	1	0	11	0	11.00	0	0
Abinash Bohara	1	0	1	1	1.00	0	0

== Statistics ==
=== Team Statistics ===
Highest team totals
Score R/W (O)	Team	Against	Result	Venue	Date
220/6 (20)	Biratnagar Kings	Pokhara Avengers	Won	TU Cricket Ground	18/11/2025
201/2 (20)	Pokhara Avengers	Karnali Yaks	Won	TU Cricket Ground	02/12/2025
193/7 (20)	Sudurpaschim Royals	Pokhara Avengers	Won	TU Cricket Ground	21/11/2025
180/4 (17.3)	Janakpur Bolts	Chitwan Rhinos	Won	TU Cricket Ground	02/12/2025
176/4 (20)	Chitwan Rhinos	Janakpur Bolts	Lost	TU Cricket Ground	02/12/2025
Source: ESPNCricinfo

Most runs
Runs	Player	Team	Inns.	SR	HS	Avg.	50/100	4's	6's
323	Adam Rossington	Pokhara Avengers	7	150.93	108*	53.83	2/1	31	19
276	Rohit Paudel	Lumbini Lions	10	99.63	49	27.60	0/0	18	9
264	Binod Bhandari	Sudurpaschim Royals	9	110.46	69*	33.00	2/0	23	8
256	D'Arcy Short	Lumbini Lions	10	121.32	57	25.60	1/0	26	9
246	Mark Watt	Karnali Yaks	7	161.84	114*	41.00	1/1	13	21
Source: ESPNcricinfo

Most wickets
Wickets	Player	Team	Inns.	Econ.	BBI
17	Sandeep Lamichhane	Biratnagar Kings	9	4.91	4/11
17	Abinash Bohara	Sudurpaschim Royals	9	7.45	4/30
17	Sher Malla	Lumbini Lions	10	6.50	3/18
15	Ruben Trumpelmann	Lumbini Lions	10	6.72	3/3
13	Shahab Alam	Kathmandu Gorkhas	8	6.21	6/25
Source: ESPNcricinfo

== End of season awards ==
Award	Prize	Player	Team
Pulser Emerging player of the tournament	Bike & Trophy	Sher Malla	Lumbini Lions
Pulser Highest Run Scorer of the tournament (Nepali)	Bike & Trophy	Rohit Paudel	Lumbini Lions
Pulser Highest Wicket taker of the tournament (Nepali)	Bike & Trophy	Sandeep Lamichhane	Biratnagar Kings
Presidential Graduate School Emerging; Player of the Tournament	1.5 million rupees worth scholarship	Tilak Bhandari	Lumbini Lions
RedBull Energetic player of the tournament	रू2 lakh (US$1,300) & Trophy	Abinash Bohara	Sudurpaschim Royals
Ncell Super 4's of the Tournament	रू2 lakh (US$1,300)	Adam Rossington	Pokhara Avengers
Presidential Graduate School; Platinum Cap Leading Run Scorer	रू0.5 lakh (US$330) & Platinum Cap	Adam Rossington	Pokhara Avengers
Arghakhanchi Cement Golden Cap Leading Wicket taker	रू0.5 lakh (US$330) & Golden Cap	Sandeep Lamichhane	Biratnagar Kings
Omoda Electrifying player of the tournament (only for Nepalese player)	Car	Rohit Paudel	Lumbini Lions
Nepal Premier League; MCC Spirit of Cricket Award	Trophy	—N/a	Kathmandu Gorkhas
Player of the tournament	रू5 lakh (US$3,300)	Ruben Trumpelmann	Lumbini Lions

- Source: The Rising Nepal

== Broadcasting ==
The league was broadcast live on the following channels:

Country	TV	Internet
Nepal	Star Sports; Kantipur Max	DishHome Go
India	Star Sports	FanCode
Bangladesh	Star Sports	DishHome Go
Bhutan	Star Sports	DishHome Go
Sri Lanka	Star Sports	DishHome Go
Maldives	Star Sports	DishHome Go
Middle East	None	DishHome Go
Rest of the World	None	DishHome Go
