= 2026 Nepal Premier League final =

Twenty20 cricket match

- Match programme cover
- Event: 2026 Nepal Premier League
Lumbini Lions	Sudurpaschim Royals
155/6	158/0
20 overs	13.3 overs
- Sudurpaschim Royals won by 10 wickets
- Date: 21 November 2026 17:00 UTC+5:45
- Venue: Tribhuvan University International Cricket Ground, Kirtipur
- Player of the match: George Munsey (Sudurpaschim Royals)
- Umpires: Prageeth Rambukwella (SL); Gazi Sohel (Ban)

The 2026 Nepal Premier League final was played on 21 November 2026 at the Tribhuvan University International Cricket Ground in Kirtipur. It was the final match of the third season of the Nepal Premier League, contested between the Lumbini Lions and the Sudurpaschim Royals. The Sudurpaschim Royals defeated the Lumbini Lions by 10 wickets to win their maiden Nepal Premier League title.

== Background ==
On 19 September 2026, the Cricket Association of Nepal (CAN) announced the schedule for the 2026 season of the Nepal Premier League. However, on 20 October 2026, the CAN announced a revised schedule for evening matches following the incorporation of the Decision Review System (DRS), which also affected the timing of the final match. It was announced that all the matches including playoffs would be played at the Tribhuvan University International Cricket Ground, Kirtipur.

== Road to the final ==
Source: Cricinfo

Road to the final
Lumbini Lions
vs
Sudurpaschim Royals
League Stage

League progression
Team	Group matches							Playoffs		
Team	1	2	3	4	5	6	7	Q1/E	Q2	F
Lumbini Lions	2	3	5	7	7	9	11	W		L
Sudurpaschim Royals	0	2	2	4	6	8	10	L	W	W

Win	Loss	No result

- Note: The total points at the end of each group match are listed.
- Note: Click on the points (group matches) or W/L (playoffs) to see the match summary.
Opponent
Date
Result
Points
Match
Opponent
Date
Result
Points
Sudurpaschim Royals
26 October 2026
Won
2
1

Chitwan Rhinos
31 October 2026
N/R
3
2

Pokhara Avengers
3 November 2026
Won
5
3

Janakpur Bolts
5 November 2026
Won
7
4

Kathmandu Gorkhas
7 November 2026
Lost
7
5

Karnali Yaks
12 November 2026
Won
9
6

Biratnagar Kings
14 November 2026
Won
11
7

Playoff stage

Qualifier 1
17 November – Kirtipur
1	Lumbini Lions	108/4 (16.4 overs)
2	Sudurpaschim Royals	105/8 (20 overs)
Eliminator
18 November – Kirtipur
3	Kathmandu Gorkhas	143/9 (20 overs)
4	Chitwan Rhinos	204/4 (20 overs)

Qualifier 2
19 November – Kirtipur
Q1L	Sudurpaschim Royals	136/7 (19.5 overs)
EW	Chitwan Rhinos	133/9 (20 overs)

Final
21 November – Kirtipur
Q1W	Lumbini Lions	155/6 (20 overs)
Q2W	Sudurpaschim Royals	158/0 (13.3 overs)

Opponent
Date
Result
Match
Opponent
Date
Result
Sudurpaschim Royals
17 November 2026
Won
Q1

Qualified for the final
Q2

2026 Nepal Premier League final

== Match ==
=== Match officials ===
- On-field umpires: Prageeth Rambukwella (SL) and Gazi Sohel (Ban)
- Third umpire: Masudur Rahman (Ban)
- Reserve umpire: Durga Subedi (Nep)
- Match referee: Wendell Labrooy (SL)
- Toss: Sudurpaschim's captain Dipendra Singh Airee won the toss and elected to field.

=== Summary ===
Final
21 November 2026
17:00 (D/N)
Scorecard

Lumbini Lions; 155/6 (20 overs)	v	Sudurpaschim Royals; 158/0 (13.3 overs)
Dilip Nath 39* (31); Scott Kuggeleijn 2/25 (4 overs)		George Munsey 125* (54)

Sudurpaschim Royals won by 10 wickets
Tribhuvan University International Cricket Ground, Kirtipur
Umpires: Prageeth Rambukwella (SL) and Gazi Sohel (Ban)
Player of the match: George Munsey (Sudurpaschim Royals)

- Sudurpaschim Royals won the toss and elected to field.

=== Lumbini Lions innings ===
Lumbini Lions innings
Player	Status	Runs	Balls	4s	6s	Strike rate
D'Arcy Short	b Airee	21	18	4	0	116.66
Aasif Sheikh	lbw b Kuggeleijn	1	4	0	0	25.00
Rohit Paudel	run out	30	31	2	0	96.77
Niroshan Dickwella	b Ratnayake	28	17	1	2	164.70
Dilip Nath	not out	39	31	0	3	125.80
Sundeep Jora	c Airee b Kuggeleijn	4	5	0	0	80.00
Ali Sheikh	c Kuggeleijn b Dhami	24	12	2	2	200.00
Ruben Trumpelmann	not out	4	2	1	0	200.00
Abhishesh Gautam	did not bat					
Sher Malla	did not bat					
Kishor Mahato	did not bat					
Extras 4 (b 1, lb 2, w 1); Total 155/6 (20 overs)				10	7	7.75 RR

Fall of wickets: 1-5 (Aasif Sheikh, 2.2 ov), 2-35 (D'Arcy Short, 5.3 ov), 3-74 (Niroshan Dickwella, 10.1 ov), 4-108 (Rohit Paudel, 14.6 ov), 5-114 (Sundeep Jora, 16.2 ov), 6-147 (Ali Sheikh, 19.3 ov)

Sudurpaschim Royals bowling
Bowler	Overs	Maidens	Runs	Wickets	Econ	Wides	NBs
Scott Kuggeleijn	4	0	25	2	6.25	0	0
Hemant Dhami	4	0	23	1	5.75	1	0
Tharindu Ratnayake	4	0	24	1	6.00	0	0
Dipendra Singh Airee	4	0	25	1	6.25	0	0
Anil Kharel	2	0	25	0	12.50	0	0
Ishan Pandey	2	0	30	0	15.00	0	0

=== Sudurpaschim Royals innings ===
Sudurpaschim Royals innings
Player	Status	Runs	Balls	4s	6s	Strike rate
George Munsey	not out	125	54	8	12	231.48
Binod Bhandari	not out	30	27	3	0	111.11
Extras 4 (lb 1, w 2); Total 158/0 (13.3 overs)				11	12	11.70 RR

Lumbini Lions bowling
Bowler	Overs	Maidens	Runs	Wickets	Econ	Wides	NBs
Ruben Trumpelmann	2	0	26	0	13.00	1	0
Kishor Mahato	3	0	38	0	12.66	0	0
Sher Malla	3.3	0	34	0	3.71	0	0
Abhishesh Gautam	2	0	20	0	10.00	0	0
D'Arcy Short	2	0	21	0	10.50	0	0
Rohit Paudel	1	0	18	0	18.00	0	0
