= Monty Desai =

Indian professional cricket coach

Personal information
- Full name: Mrugang Jagadish Desai
- Born: 28 May 1974 (age 52); India

Head coaching information
- Years: Team
- 2019: Canada
- 2023–2024: Nepal
- 2025: Kathmandu Gorkhas
- 2026–present: Canada

Monty Desai is an Indian professional cricket coach.

Desai began his coaching career with Rajasthan Royals as scout and coach where gave his service for 7 years from 2008 to 2015, He also led Andhra Ranji team as Head Coach in 2018–19 season of Ranji Trophy. Earlier, he joined Afghanistan national cricket team in Jan2018, he was part of winning team in world cup qualifiers held in Zimbabwe, later he resigned for personal reasons. After serving one full season with Andhra Cricket, he joined United Arab Emirates national team as a batting coach in 2019. He was also appointed as head coach of Canada national team for 2019 ICC World Cricket League Division Two on the same year.

In December 2019, Desai then joined West Indies national team as a batting coach, and served until 2022. He was also part of the Indian Premier League franchise Rajasthan Royals and Gujarat Lions as a performance coach and talent scout. In 2023, he was appointed head coach of Nepal national team by Cricket Association of Nepal, and led the team to qualify for the 2023 Asia Cup and 2023 Cricket World Cup Qualifier as well as to successfully retain the ODI status. Under his coaching, Nepal has also qualified for the 2024 ICC Men's T20 World Cup after a decade.

Desai was dismissed as Nepal's head coach in February 2025 as CAN decided not to renew the contract following the expiration of his tenure.

Desai was appointed as the head coach of the Kathmandu Gurkhas for the second edition of the Nepal Premier League.
