= Jagat Tamata =

Nepalese cricketer and coach

Personal information
- Born: 16 March 1964 (age 62); Achham, Nepal
- Batting: Right-handed
- Role: All rounder

International information
- National side: Nepal (1996-2001)

Head coaching information
- Years: Team
- 2016: Sagarmatha Legends
- 2015-19: Nepal
- 2024-: Sudurpaschim Royals
- Source: ESPNcricinfo, 15 October 2024

Jagat Tamata is a Nepalese cricket coach and former cricketer who has played a pivotal role in the development of cricket in Nepal. He is one of the first-generation player of Nepal cricket team's international match.

== Coaching career ==
=== National team ===
Tamata had served as the head coach of the Nepal national cricket team. He also coached the Nepal U19 men's cricket team.

=== Domestic team ===
He was appointed as head coach for Sudurpaschim Royals.

== Awards and honour ==
On 5 September 2013, Tamata was honored with an Excellence Award from the National Sports Council. At the annual NSJF Pulsar Sports Award held, at the Nepal Academy Hall in Kathmandu on Tuesday, Jagat Tamata was named coach of the decade at the ceremony.
