= 2027 Nepal Premier League =

Twenty20 cricket tournament in Nepal

- Dates: TBD – TBD
- Administrator: Cricket Association of Nepal
- Cricket format: Twenty20
- Tournament format(s): Group stage and playoffs
- Matches: TBD
- Official website: https://npl-t20.com/

The 2027 Nepal Premier League, also known as Siddhartha Bank NPL 2027 for sponsorship reasons, will be the fourth edition of the Nepal Premier League (NPL), a professional Twenty20 cricket franchise league in Nepal. The tournament will feature eight teams scheduled to held between October and December, 2027.

Sudurpaschim Royals are the defending Champions.

== Background ==
The Nepal Premier League is a franchise Twenty20 cricket league in Nepal and organised by the Cricket Association of Nepal (CAN) and features eight franchise teams.
