= DishHome =

DTH service provider in Nepal

Dish Media Network Ltd.
- Type: Public
- Founded: 2010; 16 years ago
- Headquarters: Lalitpur, Nepal
- Area served: Nepal
- Key people: Tara Manandhar (CEO); Hem Raj Dhakal (chairman)
- Products: Direct-broadcast satellite; Broadband Internet access
- Brands: Datalaya
- Members: 750000
- Number of employees: 1000+
- Website: Dish Home

DishHome is a DTH and internet service provider in Nepal. Operated by Dish Media Network Ltd, it was formed in 2010 after a merger between two DTH providers, namely Home TV and Dish Nepal. In the year of 2011 Sandmartin International Holding (SMT) became one of the key shareholders of Dish Media Network Pvt. Ltd. and provided expertise in developing new technologies and digital innovations in the satellite broadcasting.

By 2016, DishHome had crossed the 750,000 subscriber mark. Dish Home has achieved a customer base of over a million by 2019. As of April 2019, DishHome has a total of 200+ television channels, including 150+ SD channels and 50+ HD channels. In 2021, Dishhome started its own fiber internet under name DishHome Internet which has currently emerged as a major ISP in Nepal with more than 2 lakh subscribers.

== DGo ==
Formerly known as DishHome GO now Dgo is the mobile streaming application (OTT platform) from Dish Media Network. It allows users to watch live TV channels and on-demand content on smartphones, tablets, and even smart TVs.

== DTH Technology ==
DishHome uses MPEG-4 with DVB S2 digital compression technology, transmitting HD Channels and SD Channels in Ku-Band on Amos-4 at 65.0°E. DishHome relies on CAS from Verimatrix and Latens. Their STBs are provisioned by SandMartin and Arion.
