= Rijan Dhakal =

Nepalese cricketer

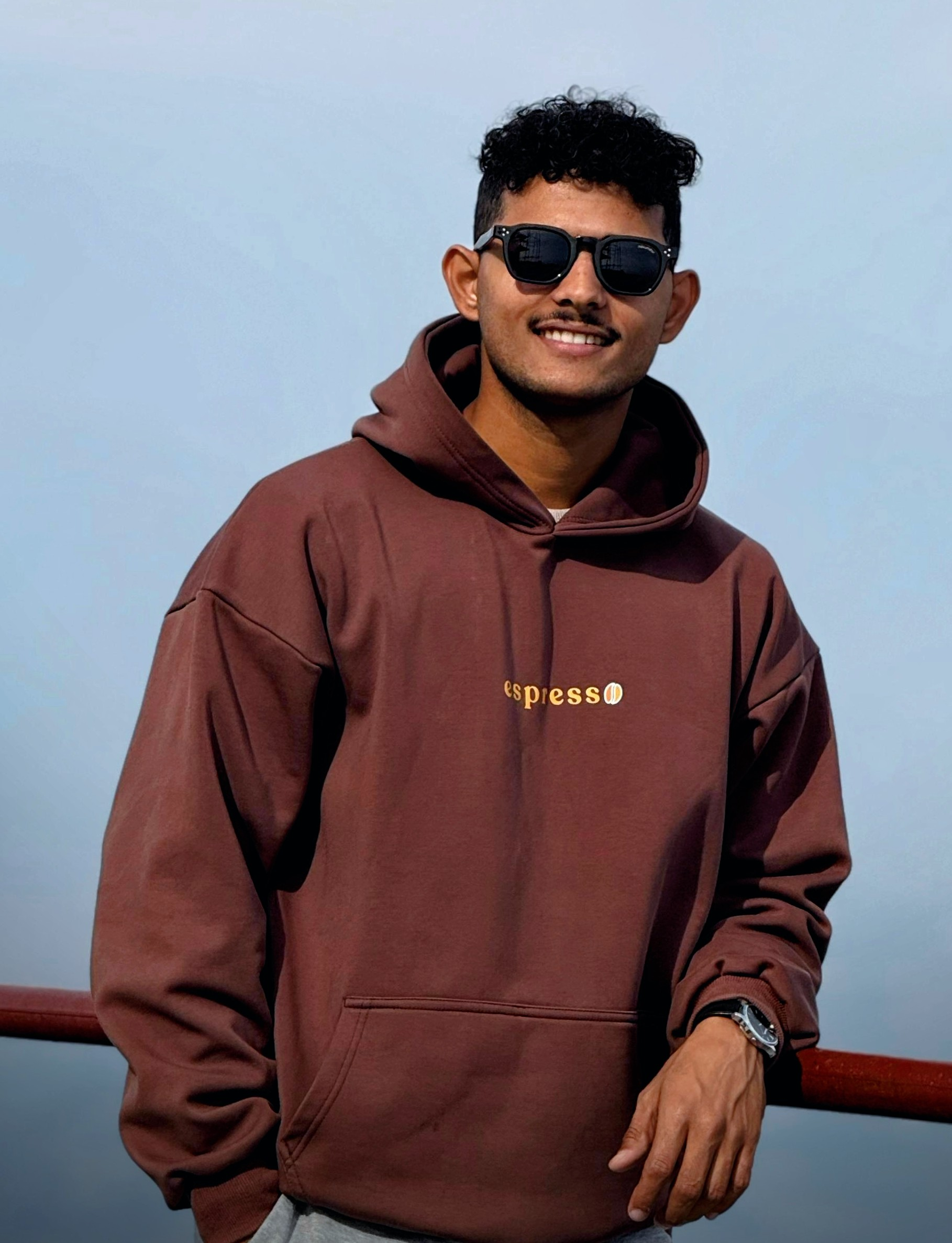

Personal information
- Born: 6 May 1999 (age 27); Hetauda, Nepal
- Batting: Right-handed
- Bowling: Left arm medium
- Role: Bowler

International information
- National side: Nepal (2024-present)
- ODI debut (cap 38): 8 February 2024 v Canada
- Last ODI: 10 February 2024 v Canada
- ODI shirt no.: 23
- T20I debut (cap 47): 28 September 2024 v Canada
- Last T20I: 17 October 2024 v United States
- T20I shirt no.: 23

Domestic team information
- Years: Team
- 2022–present: Bagmati Province
- 2024–present: Chitwan Rhinos
- Source: Cricinfo, 18 October 2024

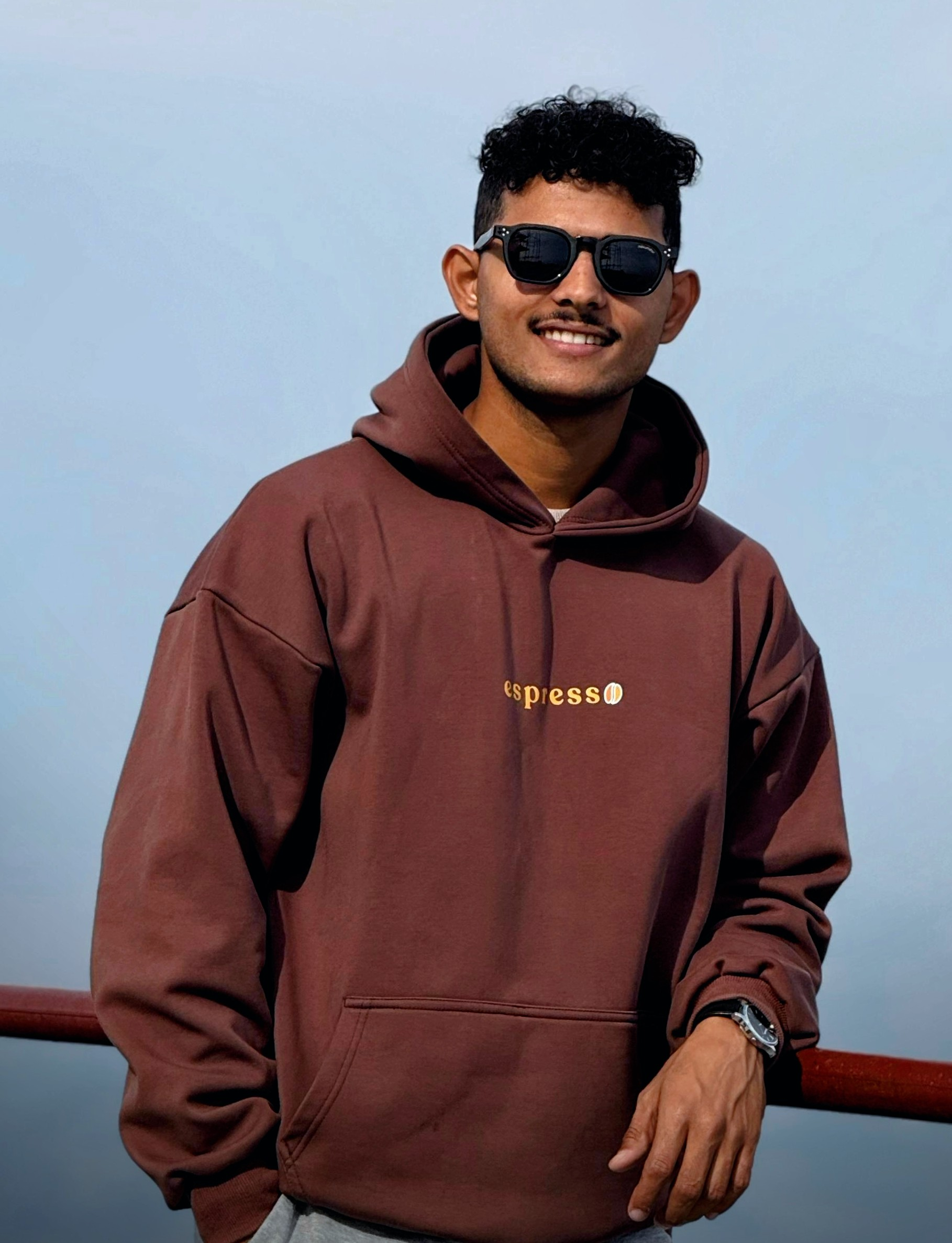
Dhakal in 2025

Rijan Dhakal (born 6 May 1999) is a Nepalese cricketer who plays as a left arm medium. He has played in different leagues including NepalT20 and Nepal Premier League for different teams like Biratnagar Super Kings, Lalitpur Patriots, & Chitwan Rhinos. He had also been a part of Under-19s and Nepal national under-16 cricket team.

Currently he has been playing under Bagmati Province in the Prime Minister One Day Cup.

== International career ==
In February 2024, he was named in Nepal's squad for their One Day International (ODI) series against the Canada and League 2 game against Netherlands and Namibia.
