= Himalaya TV =

Most watched television channel of Nepal

Himalaya Television Network Ltd
- Type: Satellite television and Online streaming
- Country: Nepal
- Availability: Worldwide
- Motto: Campaigning for Prosperity and Peace
- Owner: Online Khabar
- Launch date: 2010
- Official website: himalayatv.com

Himalaya Television (Nepali: हिमालय टेलिभिजन) is a television network of Nepal, established in 2010. Commonly known as Himalaya TV, it is headquartered in Baneshwor, Kathmandu.

Himalaya TV officially began broadcasting on December 1, 2010. The station broadcasts news, entertainment, and popular reality shows such as The Voice of Nepal, Shark Tank Nepal, Himalaya Roadies, The Voice Kids, and Dancing Stars Nepal & "Nepal biggest cricket league" Nepal Premier League

In 2018, the channel was acquired by media entrepreneurs Dharmaraj Bhusal and Shyam Kandel. Dharmaraj Bhusal is also the founder and chairman of OnlineKhabar. Following the acquisition, the channel was rebranded and relaunched in high definition on January 15, 2019.

Himalaya TV is currently owned by Online Khabar.

== 2025 Program ==
=== List of programs on Himalaya TV HD ===
The channel broadcasts a mix of news, entertainment, and reality shows, including:

The Voice of Nepal
Shark Tank Nepal
Himalaya Lok Star
The Voice Kids
Himalaya Roadies

In addition to these, Himalaya TV airs popular programs such as Indreni, Himalaya Samachar, Jeevan Sathi, Samaya Sandarva, and Yakshya Prashna, which cover a range of topics from current affairs to cultural discussions.

=== Channels ===
Channel	Language	SD/HD Availability	Notes
Himalayan Tv Hd	Nepali	SD+HD	Started Broadcast in 2010 B.s
Himalayan Premium Hd	Nepali	SD+HD	Started Broadcast in 2022 B.s During the FIFA World cup 2022

=== Programs ===
Sunday

Events	Time	Hosts	Channels
Halka Ramilo	8:00 PM		Himalayan Tv Hd
Yekshya Parshna	9:00 PM	Nimesh Banjade	Himalayan Tv Hd
Face 2 Face			Himalayan Tv Hd
Indreni	6:00 PM	Krishna Prasad Kandel	Himalayan Tv Hd
News			Himalayan Tv Hd
Samaya Sandarva			Himalayan Tv Hd

Monday

Events	Time	Hosts	Channels
Buhari	8:00 PM		Himalayan Tv Hd
Himalaya Roadies	9:00 PM (Coming Soon)		Himalayan Tv Hd
Info Plus			
Face 2 Face			Himalayan Tv Hd
Indreni	6:00 PM	Krishna Prasad Kandel	Himalayan Tv Hd
News			
Nepal Super League 2025	6:00 PM		Himalayan Premium Hd
Golmaal			Himalayan Premium Hd

Tuesday

Events	Time	Hosts	Channels
Comedy Nights with champions	8:00 PM	Bishal Bhandari	Himalayan Tv Hd
Sita	9:00 PM		
Info Plus			
Face 2 Face	2:00 PM		Himalayan Tv Hd
Indreni	6:00 PM	Krishna Prasad Kandel	Himalayan Tv Hd
News			

Wednesday

Events	Time	Hosts	Channels
Juthe	8:00 PM		Himalayan Tv Hd
Face 2 Face	2:00 PM		Himalayan Tv Hd
Indreni	6:00 PM	Krishna Prasad Kandel	Himalayan Tv Hd
News			
Samaya Sandarva			

Thursday

Events	Time	Hosts	Channels
Bittiya Shikshya	8:00 PM		Himalayan Tv Hd
Celebs Talk	9:00 PM		Himalayan Tv Hd
Face 2 Face	2:00 PM		Himalayan Tv Hd
Indreni	6:00 PM	Krishna Prasad Kandel	Himalayan Tv Hd
News			
Samaya Sandarva			

Friday

Events	Time	Hosts	Channels
The Voice of Nepal	8:00 PM		Himalayan Tv Hd
Face 2 Face			Himalayan Tv Hd
Indreni	6:00 PM	Krishna Prasad Kandel	Himalayan Tv Hd
News			
Samaya Sandarva			

Saturday

Events	Time	Hosts	Channels
Voice of Kids season 4	8:00 PM	Sushil Nepal & Roneeshma Shrestha	Himalayan Tv Hd
Face 2 Face			Himalayan Tv Hd
Indreni	6:00 PM	Krishna Prasad Kandel	Himalayan Tv Hd
News			
Samaya Sandarva			

Coming Events

Events	Coming Date	SD/HD Availability	Notes
Shark Tank Nepal S2	Coming soon	SD+HD	
Nepal's Next Top Model	Coming soon	SD+HD	
Himalayan Roadies Season 8	Coming soon		

== Previous Programs ==
=== List of programs broadcast by the Himalaya TV HD ===
- Jeevansathi Season Now | Seasons 1, 2, 3, 4, 5, 6
- The Voice of Nepal | Season 1, 2, 3, 4, 5, 6, 7
- The Voice of Kids | Seasons 1, 2, 3
- Himalaya Roadies | Seasons 1, 2, 3, 4, 5, 6, 7
- FIFA World Cup 2022 - Official Broadcast Partner
- The Game Changer
- The Evening Show at 6
- Dancing Stars Nepal
- Banking Sikcha
- Golmaal
- Everest Premier League
- Nepal Super League seasons 1, 2, 3
- PM CUP 2024
- Poet Idol
- Prime Story

== Future Projects ==
- The Voice of Nepal season 8
- Shark Tank Nepal season 2
- Himalaya Roadies season 8
- Himalaya Lock Star season 2
