= Saif Zaib =

English cricketer (born 1998)

Personal information
- Full name: Saif Ali Zaib
- Born: 22 May 1998 (age 28); High Wycombe, England
- Batting: Left-handed
- Bowling: Slow left-arm orthodox
- Role: Batsman

Domestic team information
- Years: Team
- 2014–2026: Northamptonshire (squad no. 5)
- 2023: Northern Superchargers (squad no. 16)
- 2024: Sudurpaschim Royals
- 2025: Lumbini Lions
- 2026: Sudurpaschim Royals
- 2024/25: Southern Rocks
- 2026: Southern Brave
- First-class debut: 4 August 2015; Northamptonshire v Kent
- List A debut: 31 July 2014; Northamptonshire v New Zealand A

Career statistics
Competition	FC	LA	T20
Matches	88	35	112
Runs scored	4,740	791	1,792
Batting average	35.90	29.29	23.89
100s/50s	12/24	1/4	0/8
Top score	196*	136	92
Balls bowled	3,568	1,146	533
Wickets	51	30	23
Bowling average	39.52	34.10	31.60
5 wickets in innings	2	0	0
10 wickets in match	0	0	0
Best bowling	6/115	4/23	3/12
Catches/stumpings	37/–	9/–	45/–
- Source: Cricinfo, 27 September 2026

Saif Ali Zaib (born 22 May 1998) is an English cricketer who plays as a spin-bowling all-rounder, Zaib is a left-handed batsman, who bowls left-arm orthodox spin. He made his List A debut for Northamptonshire County Cricket Club against the touring New Zealand A cricket team in July 2014, and his first-class debut the following August.

Ahead of the 2015 season, Zaib signed a three-year contract with Northamptonshire.

He made his Twenty20 cricket debut for Northamptonshire in the 2017 NatWest t20 Blast on 27 July 2017.

In January 2025, Zaib agreed a new contract with Northamptonshire running until the end of the 2027 season. On 29 October 2026, it was announced that he had been released from his contract a year early and was to join Hampshire.
