= Nandan Yadav =

Nepalese cricketer

Nandan Kumar Yadav नन्दन कुमार यादव
Personal information
- Born: 27 July 2000 (age 26); Siraha, Nepal
- Batting: Right-handed
- Bowling: Right arm medium
- Role: Bowler

International information
- National side: Nepal (2025-present)
- ODI debut (cap 42): 10 June 2025 v Netherlands
- Last ODI: 10 June 2025 v Netherlands
- ODI shirt no.: 22
- T20I debut (cap 49): 9 April 2025 v Qatar
- Last T20I: 8 February 2026 v England
- T20I shirt no.: 22

Domestic team information
- Years: Team
- 2021-2025: Bagmati Province
- 2024-present: Karnali Yaks
- 2026-present: Nepal APF Club

Career statistics
Competition	ODI	T20I	LA
Matches	3	13	3
Runs scored	12	68	12
Batting average	6.00	34.00	6.00
100s/50s	0/0	0/0	0/0
Top score	10*	37	10*
Balls bowled	168	227	168
Wickets	5	17	5
Bowling average	28.40	16.41	28.40
5 wickets in innings	0	0	0
10 wickets in match	0	0	0
Best bowling	3/39	2/18	3/39
Catches/stumpings	–/–	4/–	–/–
- Source: ESPNcricinfo, 8 February 2025

Nandan Kumar Yadav (born July 27, 2000) is a Nepalese cricketer who plays as a right-arm medium-fast pacer for the Nepal national team. He made his T20I debut on April 9, 2025, in the Hong Kong Quadrangular Men's T20 Series against Qatar. His ODI debut came against the Netherlands in Dundee, making him Nepal's 42nd ODI player.

== Early life and domestic career ==
Yadav began his cricketing journey in Nepal's domestic circuit, impressing selectors with his disciplined bowling and ability to swing the ball. His performances in local leagues and national tournaments earned him a spot in Nepal's squad for international fixtures.

Nandan is a regular player of Bagmati Team. Nandan has participated in Nepal Premier League, a prominent T20 cricket competition in Nepal

== International career ==
Yadav received his T20I cap in 2025 as a bowler.

In January 2026, Yadav was named to Nepal's squad for the 2026 T20I World Cup.

== Playing style ==
Yadav is a right-arm medium-fast pace bowler.
