= Tilak Bhandari =

Nepalese cricketer (born 2004)

Personal information
- Full name: Tilak Raj Bhandari
- Born: 28 October 2004 (age 21); Butwal, Nepal
- Batting: Right-handed
- Bowling: Right-arm leg break
- Role: Bowler

Domestic team information
- Years: Team
- 2023–present: Bagmati Province
- 2024–present: Lumbini Lions
- Source: ESPNcricinfo, 12 April 2025

Tilak Bhandari (born 28 October 2004) is a Nepalese cricketer who plays as a right-arm leg-break bowler and right-handed batsman. He represents Nepal at the under-19 level and plays domestically for Bagmati Province and Lumbini Lions in the Nepal Premier League.

== Early life and career ==
Bhandari was born in Butwal, Nepal. He developed an interest in cricket at a young age and rose through the ranks of Nepal's youth cricket system. He has represented various provincial teams in Nepal's domestic circuit, including Bagmati Province. On 8 June 2023, he delivered a standout performance against Gandaki Province, taking 4 wickets for 22 runs in four overs and was named Player of the Match. In U19 matches, Bhandari's standout performance came during a warm-up game for the 2024 U19 World Cup, where he took 3 wickets for 23 runs in 7.4 overs, showcasing his skill in pressure situations.

== Franchise ==
In the Nepal Premier League 2024 auction,Bhandari was signed by Lumbini Lions. His performances caught the attention in 2024, and retained by Lions for Season 2.
