= Durga Subedi =

Nepalese cricket umpire

Personal information
- Full name: Durga Nath Subedi
- Born: 12 December 1976 (age 49); Ilam District, Nepal
- Nickname: Devendra
- Role: Umpire

Umpiring information
- ODIs umpired: 12 (2020–2024)
- T20Is umpired: 28 (2021–2025)
- WT20Is umpired: 27 (2019–2023)
- Source: Cricinfo, 02 May 2024

Durga Nath Subedi (Nepali: दुर्गा सुवेदी, born 12 December 1976) is a Nepali cricket umpire, Sports Journalist, News reader and emcee. As of October 2023, Subedi has umpired in 11 One Day Internationals (ODIs), 21 Twenty20 Internationals (T20Is) and 27 women's T20Is.

== See also ==
- List of One Day International cricket umpires
- List of Twenty20 International cricket umpires
