= Scott Kuggeleijn =

New Zealand cricketer

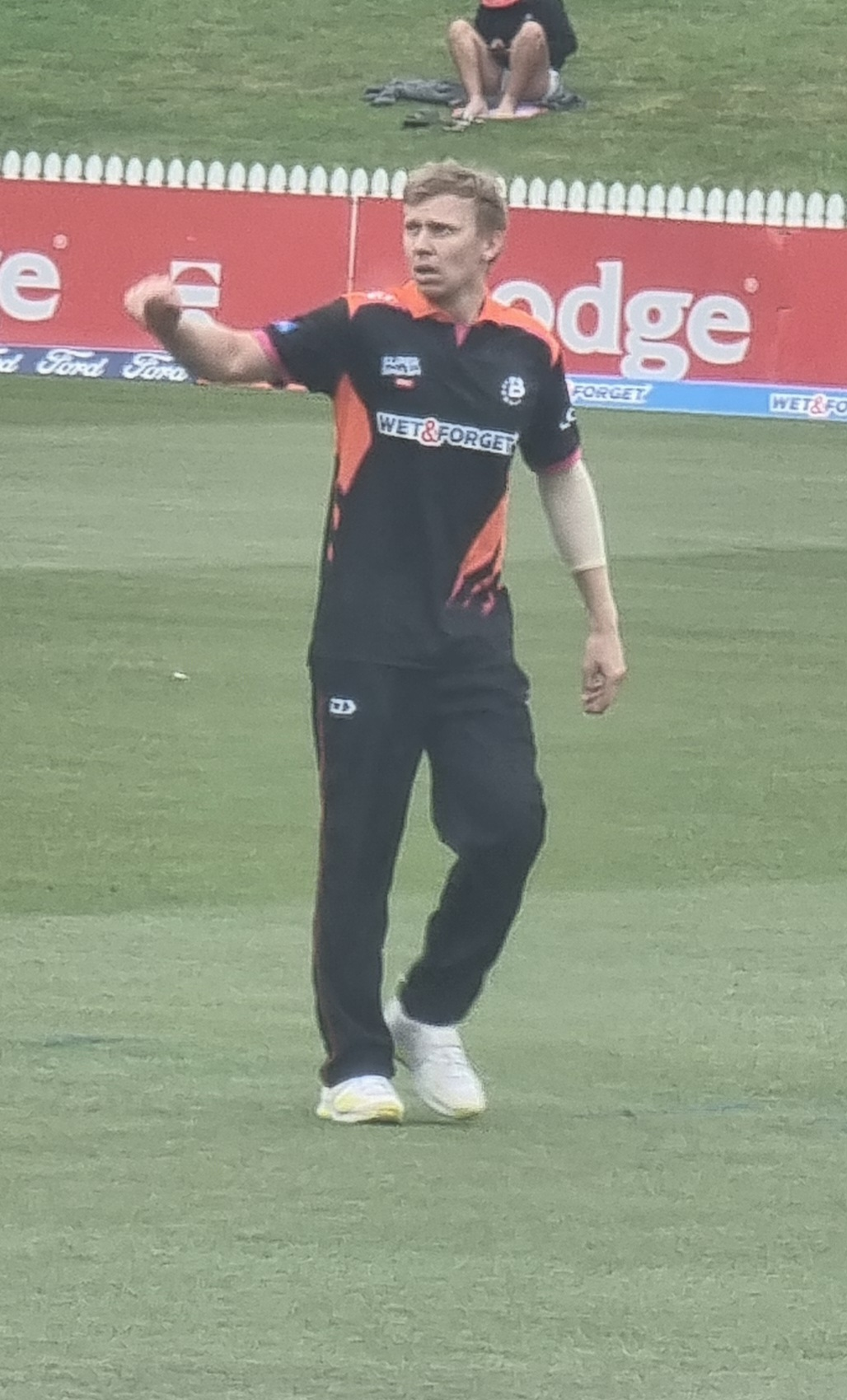
- Kuggeleijn playing for Northern Districts in 2025.

Personal information
- Full name: Scott Christopher Kuggeleijn
- Born: 3 January 1992 (age 34); Hamilton, New Zealand
- Batting: Right-handed
- Bowling: Right-arm fast-medium
- Role: Bowling all-rounder
- Relatives: Chris Kuggeleijn (father)

International information
- National side: New Zealand (2017-present)
- Test debut (cap 284): 16 February 2023 v England
- Last Test: 29 February 2024 v Australia
- ODI debut (cap 191): 14 May 2017 v Ireland
- Last ODI: 21 May 2017 v Ireland
- T20I debut (cap 80): 11 January 2019 v Sri Lanka
- Last T20I: 10 September 2021 v Bangladesh

Domestic team information
- Years: Team
- 2011/12–2012/13: Wellington
- 2013/14–present: Northern Districts
- 2019: Chennai Super Kings
- 2020: St Lucia Zouks
- 2022: St Lucia Kings
- 2024/25/26: Sudurpaschim Royals

Career statistics
Competition	Test	ODI	T20I	FC
Matches	3	2	18	110
Runs scored	92	11	79	3,918
Batting average	15.33	–	19.75	27.39
100s/50s	0/0	0/0	0/0	4/20
Top score	44	11*	35*	142*
Balls bowled	354	84	323	18,002
Wickets	6	5	16	362
Bowling average	49.00	11.60	29.43	30.11
5 wickets in innings	0	0	0	14
10 wickets in match	0	0	0	0
Best bowling	2/75	3/41	3/27	7/45
Catches/stumpings	1/–	0/–	6/–	46/–
- Source: ESPNcricinfo, 31 December 2025

Scott Christopher Kuggeleijn (born 3 January 1992) is a New Zealand international cricketer. He plays first-class cricket for Northern Districts.

== Domestic and T20 career ==
In the 2016–17 Ford Trophy, Kuggeleijn took the most wickets in the tournament, with seventeen dismissals in nine matches. In June 2018, he was awarded a contract with Northern Districts for the 2018–19 season. In March 2019, he played for Chennai Super Kings as an injury replacement during the 2019 Indian Premier League. In 2021, he signed for Royal Challengers Bangalore, again as an injury replacement, but did not play a match for the side. In 2024, he played inaugural season of Nepal Premier League for Sudurpaschim Royals and finished the season as highest wicket taker of tournament.

== International career ==
In April 2017, he was named in New Zealand's One Day International (ODI) squad for the 2017 Ireland Tri-Nation Series. He made his ODI debut for New Zealand against Ireland on 14 May 2017. He scored 11 runs in the match and dismissed William Porterfield for his first ODI wicket.

In January 2019, he was named in New Zealand's Twenty20 International (T20I) squad for the one-off T20I against Sri Lanka. He made his T20I debut in that match against Sri Lanka on 11 January 2019.

In February 2023, he was named in New Zealand's Test squad for their series against England. He made his Test debut on 16 February 2023, for New Zealand against England.

== Sexual assault accusation ==
Kuggeleijn went on trial for rape in 2016, and again in 2017 after a hung jury in the first trial. He was not convicted. When Kuggeleijn was nearly selected for the national team just after the second trial in 2017, New Zealand Cricket chief executive David White said they "respected the court process and were not in the business of relitigating past events". That, he said, "would be manifestly unfair on all parties involved. The court is the most appropriate forum for judging matters as serious as this". The position New Zealand Cricket took was criticised publicly and in the media. Kuggeleijn avoided talking about the subject in a rare press conference in December 2020 stating "I'm just trying to focus on my cricket."
