= Sher Malla =

Nepalese cricketer

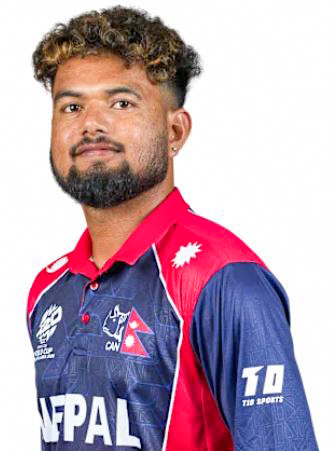

Personal information
- Full name: Sher Malla
- Born: 31 August 2000 (age 26); Dhangadhi, Nepal
- Batting: Left-handed
- Bowling: Right-arm-offbreak
- Role: Bowler

International information
- National side: Nepal (2026–present)
- ODI debut (cap 45): 10 September 2026 v Oman
- Last ODI: 12 September 2026 v United Arab Emirates
- T20I debut (cap 53): 8 February 2026 v England
- Last T20I: 8 June 2026 v Hong Kong
- Source: ESPNcricinfo, 29th July 2026

Sher Malla (born 31 August 2000) is a Nepalese cricketer, who plays as a right-arm off-break bowler and left-handed batsman. He made his T20I debut against England on 8 February 2026 at the Wankhede Stadium during the 2026 T20 World Cup. In a historic start to his career, he became the second Nepalese bowler to take a wicket with his first delivery in international cricket, dismissing Phil Salt.

Malla has been a consistent performer in domestic cricket for Sudurpashchim and a key player in national tournaments like the PM Cup, Nepal A, and Nepal under-19. He was part of Nepal's 32-member closed camp squad for the Asia–EAP Qualifier before securing his place in the final squad for the 2026 Men's T20 World Cup.

== Franchise ==
In 2024,Malla played for the Janakpur Bolts in the inaugural season of the Nepal Premier League (NPL), where the Bolts emerged as champions after defeating Sudurpaschim Royals in the finals. Following his success with the Bolts, he was acquired by the Lumbini Lions for the 2025 season of the NPL for a fee of ₨.1 million. In the 2025 tournament, He played a pivotal role in the Lions' title-winning campaign, finishing as the joint-highest wicket-taker of the season with 17 wickets. For his exceptional performance, which included a match-winning spell in the final, he was named the Emerging Player of the Tournament.
