= Dilip Nath =

Nepali cricketer (born 1997)

Personal information
- Full name: Dilip Nath
- Born: 19 December 1997 (age 28); Dadeldhura, Nepal
- Batting: Left-handed
- Role: Wicket-keeper

International information
- National side: Nepal (2022-2022)
- T20I debut (cap 40): 30 March 2022 v Malaysia
- Last T20I: 4 April 2022 v PNG

Career statistics
Competition	T20I	List A
Matches	1	9
Runs scored	15	97
Batting average	–	10.77
100s/50s	0/0	0/0
Top score	15*	41
Catches/stumpings	0/–	9/4
- Source: Cricinfo, 4 April 2022

Dilip Nath (born 19 December 1997) is a Nepalese cricketer. He made his List A debut for Nepal against the United Arab Emirates in the 2015–17 ICC World Cricket League Championship on 6 December 2017. In January 2018, he was named in Nepal's squad for the 2018 ICC World Cricket League Division Two tournament.

In March 2022, he was named in Nepal's Twenty20 International (T20I) squad for the 2021–22 Nepal T20I Tri-Nation Series. He made his T20I debut on 30 March 2022, for Nepal against Malaysia.
