= Nepal Premier League =

Professional Twenty20 cricket league in Nepal

- Tournament logo
- Countries: Nepal
- Administrator: Cricket Association of Nepal
- Headquarters: Kathmandu, Nepal
- Format: Twenty20
- First edition: 2024
- Latest edition: 2026
- Next edition: 2027
- Tournament format: Round-robin and playoffs
- Number of teams: 8
- Current champion: Sudurpaschim Royals (1st title)
- Most successful: Janakpur Bolts; Lumbini Lions; Sudurpaschim Royals (1 title each)
- Most runs: Ravi Bopara (761)
- Most wickets: Scott Kuggeleijn (42)
- TV: List of broadcasters
- Website: npl-t20.com

The Nepal Premier League (NPL) (Nepali: नेपाल प्रिमियर लिग) is a Twenty20 franchise cricket tournament in Nepal, organised by the Cricket Association of Nepal (CAN). Founded in 2024, it features eight franchise teams representing major cities and provinces of Nepal, and operates as the country's premier professional cricket competition with a professional structure with player auctions, and franchise ownership models.

The tournament is held annually between October and December and follows a round-robin format followed by playoffs.

== History ==
=== Background ===
In 2022, the Cricket Association of Nepal (CAN) organised the Nepal T20 League after signing a रू33 crore (US$2.2 million) agreement with the Indian sports management company Seven3Sports to host a professional 20-over limited-overs cricket league in Nepal for one year. However, the league was marred by several controversies and allegations, including match-fixing and corruption.

The match between Kathmandu Knights and Biratnagar Super Kings on 3 January 2023 was delayed by two hours after players refused to take the field due to unpaid salaries. Players had been contracted to receive 40% of their payments before the start of the tournament and the remaining 60% during the event. Only players from Pokhara Avengers and Lumbini All Stars had received 50% of their contracted amount, while others had received nothing. The game resumed after CAN officials assured the players that their payments would be processed.

On 4 January 2023, the captain of Kathmandu Knights Gyanendra Malla revealed that one of his teammates had been approached with a match‑fixing proposal and that the matter had been reported to the tournament's anti‑corruption unit. The incident was reported to the International Cricket Council's anti-corruption unit, which subsequently dispatched a team to Nepal to investigate the allegations. The Central Investigation Bureau also formed specialized teams to look into the claims. The Bureau's preliminary investigation revealed that three Nepali and four foreign players were under surveillance for suspected spot-fixing. Evidence also suggested that the event's management company Seven3Sports was involved in the wrongdoing. As a result, the league was ultimately shuttered.

=== Foundation of the tournament ===
Following the Nepal national cricket team's qualification for the 2024 Men's T20 World Cup, the CAN announced the launch of the Nepal Premier League (NPL) in January 2024, scheduled for November and December. On 2 August 2024, CAN invited proposals for franchise ownership, later confirming that the 2024 NPL would feature eight teams, each representing a major city in Nepal. This marked an expansion from previous competitions such as Everest Premier League and Nepal T20 League, which featured six teams.

To determine team ownership, CAN held a franchise auction on 5 September 2024. All eight teams were sold through a bidding process for a combined total of रू168,893,231 (US$1.1 million). The franchise representing Pokhara fetched the highest price at रू35,700,000 (US$240,000) bought by Nepal T20 Cricket Pvt. Ltd. It was followed by the Kathmandu franchise, sold for रू33,333,339 (US$220,000) to Kantipur Publications. The team representing Karnali received the lowest successful bid of रू11,170,000 (US$75,000) from Himalayan Builders.

=== T20 status ===
On 16 October 2026, the ICC officially sanctioned the NPL and lifted restrictions on active four Test players. Thus all NPL matches from the 2026 edition onwards have official List A Twenty20 (T20) status.

== Organization ==
The CAN is responsible for the league's overall functions; it organises, manages, and runs the league. As of December 2025, its members included:

- Chatur Bahadur Chand – President, CAN
- Roshan Kumar Singh – Vice President, CAN
- Paras Khadka – Secretary, CAN
- Padam Bahadur Khadka – Treasurer, CAN
- Jayanti Devi Bhatta – Member
- Dhirendra Saud – Member
- Durga Raj Pathak – Member

== Squads ==
A team can acquire players through the annual player auction, personally signing overseas players and signing unsold players from the auction as replacements for bought players who are unavailable for the season.

=== Marquee player ===
Each NPL team is assigned one marquee player through a random draw system. The allocation is fixed for a three-year cycle, after which a new draw takes place. This system was intended to maintain competitive balance, though it limits franchise control over top player selection.

=== Player acquisition ===
For the 2025 NPL season, the total auction purse for each team was रू90 lakh (US$60,000). Each squad must have a squad of 16 players, with the maximum of six foreign players.

==== Auction ====
Before the auction, franchises are allowed to retain a limited number of players from their previous season squad. Retention rules are announced prior to each auction and may vary by season. Salaries of retained players are deducted from the team's auction purse. Players not retained enter the auction pool along with new registered players. Each player is given a base price, and franchises bid for them during the auction. The highest bidding franchise secures the player, and the final bid becomes the player's season salary. Unsold players may later be signed as replacement players during the tournament, subject to league approval. In some seasons, a mega auction format may be introduced where franchises must release a larger portion of their squads to ensure parity.

== Summary ==
=== Seasons ===
Details of Nepal Premier League seasons
#	Year	Dates	Venues	Teams	Matches	Ref.
1	2024	30 November 2024	Tribhuvan University, Kirtipur	8	32	
2	2025	17 November 2025	Tribhuvan University, Kirtipur	8	32	
3	2026	26 October 2026	Tribhuvan University, Kirtipur	8	32	

=== Final results ===
Details of Nepal Premier League finals
Year	Final				Ref.
Year	Date & Venue	Winner	Victory margin	Runner-up	Ref.
2024	21 December 2024; Tribhuvan University, Kirtipur	Janakpur Bolts; 185/5 (19.2 overs)	5 wickets	Sudurpaschim Royals; 184/9 (20 overs)	
2025	13 December 2025; Tribhuvan University, Kirtipur	Lumbini Lions; 86/4 (9 overs)	6 wickets	Sudurpaschim Royals; 85 (19.1 overs)	
2026	21 November 2026; Tribhuvan University, Kirtipur	Sudurpaschim Royals; 158/0 (13.3 overs)	10 wickets	Lumbini Lions; 155/6 (20 overs)	

== Teams ==
The league has eight teams based in provinces and cities across Nepal. The franchise, known as Kathmandu Gurkhas in 2024, was renamed Kathmandu Gorkhas in 2025 to better reflect Nepal's roots, according to franchise CEO Suraj Singh Thakuri.

A map of Nepal with pin-points on NPL teams

Details of Nepal Premier League teams
Team	City	Debut	Captain	Head coach	Owner(s)	Auction bid
Biratnagar Kings	Biratnagar, Koshi Province	2024	Sandeep Lamichhane	Dhammika Prasad	M.A.D. Dream Sports	रू1.51 crore (US$100,000)
Chitwan Rhinos	Bharatpur, Bagmati Province	2024	Sikandar Raza	Sohail Tanvir	Chitwan Medical College	रू1.76 crore (US$120,000)
Janakpur Bolts	Janakpur, Madhesh Province	2024	Harmeet Singh	Shivnarine Chanderpaul	Dream Sports	रू2.05 crore (US$140,000)
Karnali Yaks	Birendranagar, Karnali Province	2024	David Miller	Gyanendra Malla	Himalayan Builders	रू1.11 crore (US$74,000)
Kathmandu Gorkhas	Kathmandu, Bagmati Province	2024	Karan KC	Monty Desai	Kathmandu Sports Development Venture	रू3.33 crore (US$220,000)
Lumbini Lions	Siddharthanagar, Lumbini Province	2024	Rohit Paudel	Tinu Yohannan	Fortuna Health Care	रू1.86 crore (US$120,000)
Pokhara Avengers	Pokhara, Gandaki Province	2024	Chamika Karunaratne	Ajantha Mendis	Nepal T20 Cricket Pvt. Ltd.	रू3.57 crore (US$240,000)
Sudurpaschim Royals	Dhangadhi, Sudurpashchim Province	2024	Dipendra Singh Airee	Misbah-ul-Haq	Empire Sports	रू1.68 crore (US$110,000)

== Team performances ==
Seasons Teams	2024	2025	2026
Biratnagar Kings	R1	PO	R1
Chitwan Rhinos	PO	R1	PO
Janakpur Bolts	C	R1	R1
Kathmandu Gorkhas	R1	PO	PO
Karnali Yaks	PO	R1	R1
Lumbini Lions	R1	C	RU
Pokhara Avengers	R1	R1	R1
Sudurpaschim Royals	RU	RU	C
Ref.			

Legend

- C Champions
- RU Runners-up
- PO Playoffs
- R1 League stage

=== Overall ===
The table below provides a summary of the performances of teams over past Nepal Premier League seasons.

Overall team performances in Nepal Premier League seasons
Team (Note: Teams are ordered by their best performance, then winning percentage, then (if equal) by alphabetical order.)	Apps	Mat	Won	Lost	NR	Win %	Best performance
Janakpur Bolts	2	17	8	9	0	47.05	Champions (2024)
Lumbini Lions	2	17	8	9	0	47.05	Champions (2025)
Sudurpaschim Royals	2	18	14	4	0	77.77	Champions (2026)
Biratnagar Kings	2	16	7	9	0	43.75	Playoffs (2025)
Karnali Yaks	2	16	7	9	0	43.75	Playoffs (2024)
Chitwan Rhinos	2	15	6	9	0	40.00	Playoffs (2024)
Kathmandu Gorkhas	2	15	6	9	0	40.00	Playoffs (2025)
Pokhara Avengers	2	14	4	9	0	28.57	League stage (2024, 2025)
As of 2025 Nepal Premier League Source:

== Records ==
- Source: Records extracted from ESPNcricinfo.

As of 13 December 2025

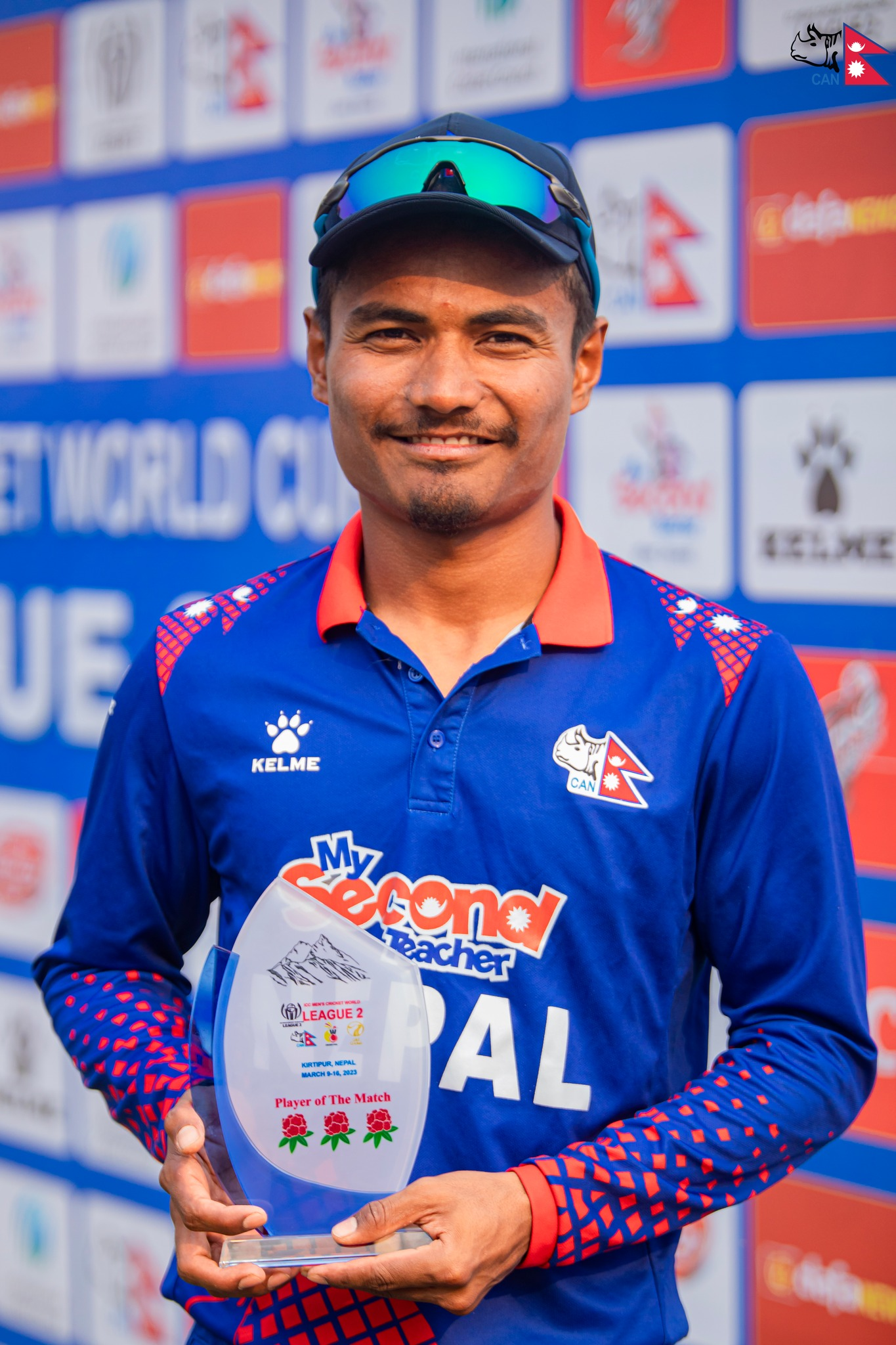
Rohit Paudel is the highest run-scorer in NPL.

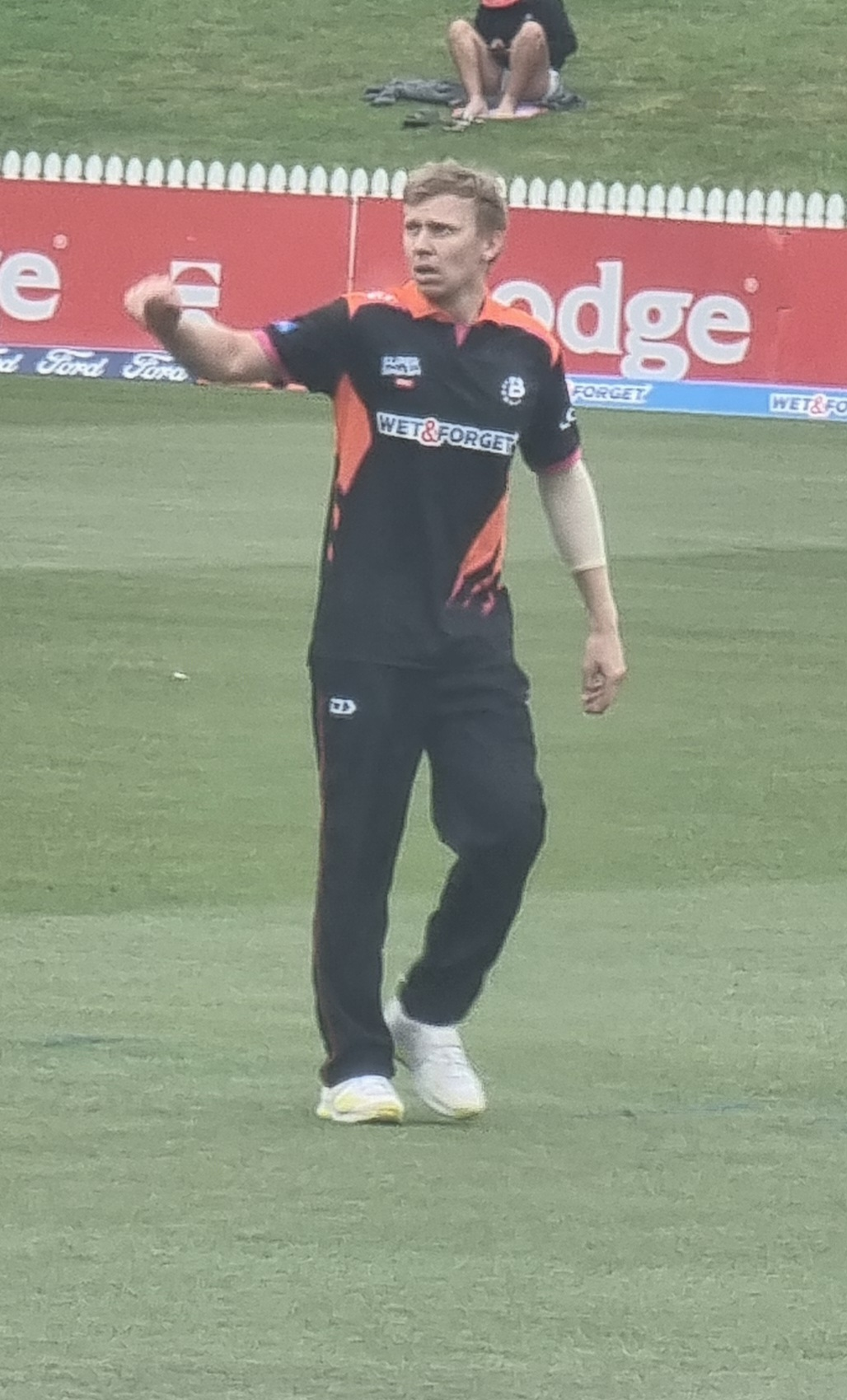
Scott Kuggeleijn is the highest wicket-taker in NPL.

=== Team records ===
Record for	Record holder	Record	Season(s)	Ref.
Highest team total	Biratnagar Kings (v Pokhara Avengers) at	220/6	2025	
Lowest team total	Janakpur Bolts (v Sudurpaschim Royals) at	51	2024	

=== Batting records ===
Record for	Record holder	Record	Season(s)	Ref.
Most runs	Rohit Paudel (Lumbini Lions)	555	2024 – 2025	
Most runs in a season	Adam Rossington (Pokhara Avengers)	323	2025	
Highest score	Mark Watt (Karnali Yaks) v Lumbini Lions at	114*	2025	
Most centuries	Andries Gous (Pokhara Avengers)	1		
Most centuries	Mark Watt (Karnali Yaks)	1		
Most centuries	Adam Rossington (Pokhara Avengers)	1		

=== Bowling records ===
Record for	Record holder	Record	Season(s)	Ref.
Most wickets	Scott Kuggeleijn (Sudurpaschim Royals)	27	2024 – 2025	
Most wickets in a season	Scott Kuggeleijn (Sudurpaschim Royals)	17	2024	
Most wickets in a season	Lalit Rajbanshi (Janakpur Bolts)	17	2024	
Most wickets in a season	Abinash Bohara (Sudurpaschim Royals)	17	2025	
Most wickets in a season	Sandeep Lamichhane (Biratnagar Kings)	17	2025	
Most wickets in a season	Sher Malla (Lumbini Lions)	17	2025	
Best bowling figures	v at			

=== Fielding records ===
Record for	Record holder	Record	Season(s)	Ref.
Most wicket-keeper dismissals	Binod Bhandari (Sudurpaschim Royals)	14	2024 – 2025	
Most wicket-keeper dismissals in a season				
Most catches	Anil Sah (Janakpur Bolts)	14	2024 – 2025	

== End of season awards ==
=== Prize money ===
The distribution of the prize money pool of रू2.90 crore (US$190,000) is as follows:

- Winning team: रू1.5 crore (US$100,000)
- Runner-up team: रू80 lakh (US$53,000)
- Third-place team: रू40 lakh (US$27,000)
- Fourth-place team: रू20 lakh (US$13,000)

=== MCC Spirit of Cricket Award ===
The MCC Nepal Premier League Spirit of Cricket Award was introduced in the Nepal Premier League from its second season following a collaboration between the Cricket Association of Nepal (CAN) and the Marylebone Cricket Club (MCC). The award is presented to the franchise that best upholds values such as fair play, respect, and sportsmanship throughout the tournament.

Winners of the MCC Spirit of Cricket Award
Season	Winner	Ref.
2024	Lumbini Lions	
2025	Kathmandu Gorkhas	

=== Platinum cap ===
The "platinum cap" is awarded to the highest run-scorer at the end of each NPL.

Winners of the platinum cap
Season	Winner	Ref.
2024		
2025	Adam Rossington	

=== Golden cap ===
The "golden cap" is awarded to the leading wicket-taker in a NPL season.

Winners of the golden cap
Season	Winner	Ref.
2024		
2025	Sandeep Lamichhane	

=== Most valuable player ===
The "most valuable player" award is presented to the best overall performer in each NPL season, based on batting, bowling, and overall match impact.

Winners of the most valuable player awards
Season	Winner	Ref.
2024		
2025		

== Title sponsorship ==
Siddhartha Bank was announced as the title sponsor of the NPL ahead of its inaugural season in 2024, after signing a five-year agreement with the CAN. As a result of the deal the NPL is branded as the "Siddhartha Bank Nepal Premier League" for a five-year period from 2024 to 2029. Reports indicated that the agreement represented the highest-ever investment in Nepali sports, with estimates of a total commitment around रू20 crore (US$1.3 million) over five years, aimed at supporting the development and commercial growth of cricket in Nepal.

== Broadcasting ==
The CAN announced its television rights partnership with Star Sports and Himalaya sports Over-the-top media rights to Net TV Nepal for the third season.

Broadcasters for the season
Country	Television broadcast	Streaming platform	Ref.
Nepal	Star Sports; Himalaya sports	NET TV	
India	Star Sports; Willow (TV channel)	FanCode	
Bangladesh	Star Sports; Willow (TV channel)		
Bhutan	Star Sports; Willow (TV channel)		
Sri Lanka	Star Sports; Willow (TV channel)		
Maldives	Star Sports; Willow (TV channel)		
Middle East	—N/a	NET TV	

== See also ==
- Cricket in Nepal
- Sports in Nepal – An overview of sports culture in Nepal
- Prime Minister Cup
