= Sultani =

Sultani may refer to:

- Sultani (coin), an Ottoman gold coin
- Sultani, Iran, a village in Iran
- Sultani, a surname notably borne by
  - Basharmal Sultani (born 1985), Afghan Olympic athlete
  - Tomás Sultani (born 1998), Argentinian professional footballer
  - Samim Sultani, Afghan cricketer
  - Tahsin Sultani, Afghan cricketer
- Sultani, a masculine given name notably borne by
  - Sultani Makenga (born 1973), Congolese rebel leader

== See also ==
- Soltani (disambiguation)
- Sultaniyya (disambiguation)
