= 2017 Shpageeza Cricket League =

Cricket tournament

2017 Shpageeza Cricket League شپږيزه کريکټ ليګ ۲۰۱۷
- Dates: 11 September 2017 – 21 September 2017
- Administrator: Afghanistan Cricket Board (ACB)
- Cricket format: Twenty20
- Tournament format(s): Round-robin and playoffs
- Host: Afghanistan
- Champions: Band-e-Amir Dragons
- Participants: 6
- Matches: 19
- Player of the series: Karim Sadiq (Kabul Eagles)
- Most runs: Asghar Afghan (Kabul Eagles) 250
- Most wickets: Zahir Khan (Mis Ainak Knights) 15
- Official website: www.shpageeza.af

The 2017 season of the Shpageeza Cricket League (Pashto: شپږيزه کريکټ ليګ ۲۰۱۷), also known as SCL 5, was the fifth edition of the Shpageeza, a professional Twenty20 cricket league established by the Afghanistan Cricket Board (ACB) in 2013. The tournament featured the six teams that played in the previous season. The 2017 season was reported to be played from 18 to 28 July 2017, but took place in September 2017, with the Kabul International Cricket Ground hosting all the matches.

The player auction took place in May 2017. Overseas players sold during the auction included Umar Akmal, Sohail Tanvir, Kamran Akmal, Rumman Raees, Sohail Khan, Mohammad Nawaz and Mohammad Rizwan (Pakistan), Tamim Iqbal, Imrul Kayes and Sabbir Rahman (Bangladesh), Sikandar Raza, Solomon Mire, Sean Williams and Hamilton Masakadza (Zimbabwe) and Rayad Emrit (West Indies). However, following a breakdown in relations between the ACB and the Pakistan Cricket Board (PCB), the PCB banned its players from taking part. The Bangladesh players also withdrew. As a result of this, and the tournament moving from July to September, overseas players were redrafted. Shortly before the tournament, Sean Williams decided not to travel to join up with Spin Ghar Tigers in order to work on his fitness.

On 13 September 2017, during the match between Boost Defenders and Mis Ainak Knights, a suicide bomber detonated explosives at a checkpoint near the road leading to the stadium, killing three people. The match was briefly halted, but soon resumed. Following the blast, the South African and Zimbabwean cricket boards ordered their representatives to return home. However, most of the Zimbabwean players opted to remain and continue with the tournament, as did the majority of other overseas players, coaches, and commentators such as Dean Jones who expressed his solidarity with the people of Afghanistan. This was the first edition of the tournament since the International Cricket Council granted it official Twenty20 status (originally it was given List A cricket status before the 50-over Ghazi Amanullah Khan Regional One Day Tournament was also recognised).

== Teams auction ==
For the first time in the history of the tournament, since its introduction in 2013 edition of Shpageeza Cricket League, the six teams are now franchise based team and are sold/owned for 3 years, by the winning bid franchises.

- Band-e-Amir Dragons is sold for US$150,000 to the Paragon Group, a logistics and supply services company.
- Spin Ghar Tigers is sold to Muslimyar Group for US$69,000.
- Kabul Eagles is sold for US$89,000 to General Petroleum.
- Amo Sharks is sold to Al-Masafi Group for US$110,000.
- Mis Ainak Knights is sold for US$90,000 to Wazirzai Group.
- Boost Defenders is sold for US$80,000 to Arif Azim Group.

== Squads ==
Amo Sharks	Band-e-Amir Dragons	Boost Defenders	Kabul Eagles	Mis Ainak Knights	Spin Ghar Tigers
Coach
(England) Gordon Parsons	(India) Umesh Patwal	(England) Adam Hollioake	(Cricket West Indies) Augustin Logie	(England) Andrew Moles	(South Africa) Herschelle Gibbs
Captain
(Afghanistan) Mirwais Ashraf	(Afghanistan) Rashid Khan	(Afghanistan) Shapoor Zadran	(Afghanistan) Asghar Afghan	(Afghanistan) Mohammad Nabi	(Afghanistan) Shafiqullah
Overseas Players
(Pakistan) Abdul Razzaq (Zimbabwe) Hamilton Masakadza (Zimbabwe) Richard Ngarava	(Zimbabwe) Tendai Chatara (Sri Lanka) Ashan Priyanjan (South Africa) Glenton Stuurman (Zimbabwe) Luke Jongwe (Cricket West Indies) ~~Denesh Ramdin~~	(Zimbabwe) Johnathan Campbell (South Africa) Abdul Razak (South Africa) Cameron Delport (Cricket West Indies) Rayad Emrit (Sri Lanka) Jeevan Mendis (South Africa) Morné van Wyk	(Zimbabwe) Solomon Mire (Zimbabwe) Richmond Mutumbami (Oman) Zeeshan Maqsood	(Zimbabwe) Ryan Burl (Zimbabwe) Vusi Sibanda (Zimbabwe) Sikandar Raza	(Oman) Bilal Khan (Zimbabwe) Elton Chigumbura (Zimbabwe) Tendai Chisoro (Zimbabwe) ~~Sean Williams~~
Afghan Players
Afsar Zazai; Dawlat Khan; Fazal Zazai; Imran Mohammadi; Mohammad Alam; Najeeb Tarakai; Nasir Totakhil; Nawab Khan; Noor-ul-Haq; Perwez Malikzai; Rahmatullah Sahaq; Sharafuddin Ashraf; Tahir Khan; Yamin Ahmadzai; Yousuf Zazai	Amin Shinwari; Arif Khan; Fitratullah Khawari; Habib Sultani; Hazratullah; Ikram Ali Khil; Javed Ahmadi; Javeed Khan; Muslim Musa; Najibullah Zadran; Qasim Oryakhail; Rahmat Shah; Samim Sultani; Shahidullah; Tahsin Sultani; Wafadar; Wahab Shinwari	Abdul Baqi; Fazal Niazai; Gulbadin Naib; Juma Gul; Mujeeb Ur Rahman; Munir Ahmad; Nasir Khan; Nawroz Mangal; Shabir Noori; Tariq Stanikzai; Waheedullah Shafaq; Waqar Ishakqai; Zia-ur-Rehman	Abdullah Mazari; Fareed Ahmad; Hamid Hassan; Hashmatullah Shahidi; Imran Janat; Karim Janat; Karim Sadiq; Khaibar Omar; Mohammad Ibrahim; Mohammad Sardar; Sayed Nasratullah; Qais Ahmad; Sayed Abdullah; Shawkat Zaman	Bahar Shinwari; Darwish Rasooli; Dawlat Zadran; Ghamai Zadran; Ibrahim Zadran; Ihsanullah; Nasir Jamal; Naveen-ul-Haq; Nawaz Khan; Nisar Wahdat; Rahim Mangal; Rahmanullah Gurbaz; Zahir Khan; Zahir Shehzad; Zia-ul-Haq	Abdullah Adil; Abdul Wasi; Aftab Alam; Amir Hamza; Batin Shah; Fazal Haq; Haji Murad Muradi; Nijat Masood; Noor Ali Zadran; Rokhan Barakzai; Samiullah Shenwari; Usman Ghani; Younas Ahmadzai

After the squads were announced, Band-e-Amir Dragons added Tendai Chatara (Zimbabwe) and Ashan Priyanjan (Sri Lanka), while Boost Defenders added Abdul Razak (South Africa) and Johnathan Campbell (Zimbabwe) to their squads as overseas players.

== Round-robin ==
=== Points table ===
Team	Pld	W	L	T	NRR	Pts
Band-e-Amir Dragons	5	4	1	0	+1.689	8
Mis Ainak Knights	5	4	1	0	+0.437	8
Kabul Eagles	5	3	2	0	+0.337	6
Boost Defenders	5	2	3	0	–0.172	4
Spin Ghar Tigers	5	2	3	0	–1.017	4
Amo Sharks	5	0	5	0	–1.441	0

=== Fixtures ===
11 September 2017
Scorecard

Boost Defenders; 136/7 (20 overs)	v	Kabul Eagles; 140/2 (17.2 overs)
Cameron Delport 53 (45); Solomon Mire 2/22 (4 overs)		Asghar Stanikzai 72* (35); Abdul Razak 1/20 (2 overs)

Kabul Eagles won by 8 wickets
Alokozay Kabul International Cricket Ground, Kabul
Umpires: Ahmed Shah Durrani and Bismillah Jan Shinwari
Player of the match: Asghar Stanikzai (Kabul Eagles)

- Boost Defenders won the toss and elected to bat.
- Khaibar Omar, Shawkat Zaman (Kabul Eagles), Juma Gul, Tariq Stanikzai, Zia-ur-Rehman and Mujeeb Ur Rahman (Boost Defenders) all made their T20 debuts.

11 September 2017
Scorecard

Amo Sharks; 159/7 (20 overs)	v	Spin Ghar Tigers; 159/8 (20 overs)
Tahir Khan 38 (28); Aftab Alam 2/23 (4 overs)		Usman Ghani 41 (20); Nasir Totakhil 4/17 (4 overs)

Match tied
(Spin Ghar Tigers won the one-over eliminator)
Alokozay Kabul International Cricket Ground, Kabul
Umpires: Ahmed Shah Pakteen and Mehmood Kharotai
Player of the match: Elton Chigumbura (Spin Ghar Tigers)

- Amo Sharks won the toss and elected to bat.
- Nasir Totakhil, Noor-ul-Haq, Tahir Khan (Amo Sharks), Younas Ahmadzai and Batin Shah (Spin Ghar Tigers) all made their T20 debuts.

12 September 2017
Scorecard

Mis Ainak Knights; 139/6 (20 overs)	v	Band-e-Amir Dragons; 133 (18.5 overs)
Vusi Sibanda 59 (67); Rashid Khan 3/22 (4 overs)		Rahmat Shah 36 (28); Sikandar Raza 3/9 (4 overs)

Mis Ainak Knights won by 6 runs
Alokozay Kabul International Cricket Ground, Kabul
Umpires: Ahmed Shah Durrani and Izatullah Safi
Player of the match: Sikandar Raza (Mis Ainak Knights)

- Band-e-Amir Dragons won the toss and elected to field.
- Rahmat Shah, Shahidullah, Muslim Musa, Qasim Oryakhail (Band-e-Amir Dragons), Rahmanullah Gurbaz, Ihsanullah, Ryan Burl, Nasir Jamal, Ibrahim Zadran and Zahir Khan (Mis Ainak Knights) all made their T20 debuts.

12 September 2017
Scorecard

Spin Ghar Tigers; 193/6 (20 overs)	v	Boost Defenders; 180/8 (20 overs)
Usman Ghani 74 (52); Gulbadin Naib 3/25 (4 overs)		Nawroz Mangal 41 (24); Aftab Alam 4/54 (4 overs)

Spin Ghar Tigers won by 13 runs
Alokozay Kabul International Cricket Ground, Kabul
Umpires: Ahmed Shah Pakteen and Sarika Prasad
Player of the match: Usman Ghani (Spin Ghar Tigers)

- Spin Ghar Tigers won the toss and elected to bat.

13 September 2017
Scorecard

Amo Sharks; 130/9 (20 overs)	v	Kabul Eagles; 131/4 (17 overs)
Sharafuddin Ashraf 32 (13); Karim Sadiq 3/12 (4 overs)		Solomon Mire 37 (17); Richard Ngarava 2/19 (4 overs)

Kabul Eagles won by 6 wickets
Alokozay Kabul International Cricket Ground, Kabul
Umpires: Izatullah Safi and Mehmood Kharotai
Player of the match: Karim Sadiq (Kabul Eagles)

- Kabul Eagles won the toss and elected to field.

13 September 2017
Scorecard

Boost Defenders; 201/6 (20 overs)	v	Mis Ainak Knights; 194/8 (20 overs)
Cameron Delport 100 (44); Mohammad Nabi 2/37 (4 overs)		Nasir Jamal 83 (51); Gulbadin Naib 3/36 (4 overs)

Boost Defenders won by 7 runs
Alokozay Kabul International Cricket Ground, Kabul
Umpires: Bismillah Jan Shinwari and Sarika Prasad

- Boost Defenders won the toss and elected to bat.
- Nasir Khan and Waheedullah Shafaq (Boost Defenders) both made their T20 debuts.

14 September 2017
Scorecard

Band-e-Amir Dragons; 162/9 (20 overs)	v	Spin Ghar Tigers; 80 (14.3 overs)
Shahidullah 57 (39); Bilal Khan 2/20 (4 overs)		Samiullah Shenwari 24 (19); Tendai Chatara 3/7 (2.3 overs)

Band-e-Amir Dragons won by 82 runs
Alokozay Kabul International Cricket Ground, Kabul
Umpires: Mehmood Kharotai and Sarika Prasad

- Spin Ghar Tigers won the toss and elected to field.
- Samim Sultani and Ikram Ali Khil (Band-e-Amir Dragons) both made their T20 debuts.

14 September 2017
Scorecard

Amo Sharks; 111/7 (20 overs)	v	Mis Ainak Knights; 112/2 (17.4 overs)
Abdul Razzaq 30* (24); Dawlat Zadran 3/15 (4 overs)		Vusi Sibanda 42 (44); Nasir Totakhil 2/21 (4 overs)

Mis Ainak Knights won by 8 wickets
Alokozay Kabul International Cricket Ground, Kabul
Umpires: Ahmed Shah Pakteen and Izatullah Safi
Player of the match: Dawlat Zadran (Mis Ainak Knights)

- Amo Sharks won the toss and elected to bat.
- Fazal Zazai, Yousuf Zazai (Amo Sharks) and Darwish Rasooli (Mis Ainak Knights) all made their T20 debuts.

15 September 2017
Scorecard

Band-e-Amir Dragons; 154/7 (20 overs)	v	Boost Defenders; 148/9 (20 overs)
Javed Ahmadi 75 (47); Gulbadin Naib 2/31 (4 overs)		Munir Ahmad 58* (41); Rashid Khan 3/22 (4 overs)

Band-e-Amir Dragons won by 6 runs
Alokozay Kabul International Cricket Ground, Kabul
Umpires: Ahmed Shah Durrani and Mehmood Kharotai
Player of the match: Javed Ahmadi (Band-e-Amir Dragons)

- Boost Defenders won the toss and elected to field.
- Johnathan Campbell, Munir Ahmad (Boost Defenders) and Wafadar (Band-e-Amir Dragons) all made their T20 debuts.

15 September 2017
Scorecard

Spin Ghar Tigers; 182/4 (20 overs)	v	Kabul Eagles; 157/2 (16.1 overs)
Shafiqullah 60 (24); Zeeshan Maqsood 1/10 (2 overs)		Karim Sadiq 50 (31); Bilal Khan 1/30 (4 overs)

Kabul Eagles won by 8 wickets DL Mode
Alokozay Kabul International Cricket Ground, Kabul
Umpires: Bismillah Jan Shinwari and Izatullah Safi
Player of the match: Hashmatullah Shahidi (Kabul Eagles)

- Spin Ghar Tigers won the toss and elected to bat.

16 September 2017
Scorecard

Kabul Eagles; 146/8 (20 overs)	v	Mis Ainak Knights; 152/8 (20 overs)
Shawkat Zaman 34 (19); Dawlat Zadran 3/19 (3 overs)		Ihsanullah 54 (37); Karim Janat 3/28 (4 overs)

Mis Ainak Knights won by 2 wickets
Alokozay Kabul International Cricket Ground, Kabul
Umpires: Ahmed Shah Pakteen and Izatullah Safi
Player of the match: Dawlat Zadran (Mis Ainak Knights)

- Mis Ainak Knights won the toss and elected to field.
- Imran Janat, Sayed Abdullah and Sayed Nasratullah (Kabul Eagles) all made their T20 debuts.

16 September 2017
Scorecard

Boost Defenders; 130/7 (20 overs)	v	Amo Sharks; 66/6 (12 overs)
Nasir Khan 57* (47); Sharafuddin Ashraf 2/13 (4 overs)		Najeeb Tarakai 26 (15); Fazal Niazai 3/17 (3 overs)

Boost Defenders won by 21 runs
Alokozay Kabul International Cricket Ground, Kabul
Umpires: Ahmed Shah Durrani and Bismillah Jan Shinwari
Player of the match: Fazal Niazai (Boost Defenders)

- Boost Defenders won the toss and elected to bat.
- Nawab Khan and Imran Mohammadi (Amo Sharks) both made their T20 debuts.

17 September 2017
Scorecard

Spin Ghar Tigers; 130/9 (20 overs)	v	Mis Ainak Knights; 132/3 (17.4 overs)
Sajjad Ali 37 (30); Mohammad Nabi 3/24 (4 overs)		Ihsanullah 33 (27); Sajjad Ali 2/26 (4 overs)

Mis Ainak Knights won by 7 wickets
Alokozay Kabul International Cricket Ground, Kabul
Umpires: Ahmed Shah Pakteen and Izatullah Safi
Player of the match: Mohammad Nabi (Mis Ainak Knights)

- Mis Ainak Knights won the toss and elected to field.
- Haji Murad Muradi and Abdullah Adil (Spin Ghar Tigers) both made their T20 debuts.

17 September 2017
Scorecard

Amo Sharks; 102 (18.3 overs)	v	Band-e-Amir Dragons; 105/1 (11.2 overs)
Perwez Malikzai 34 (23); Rashid Khan 4/10 (4 overs)		Hazratullah 52 (29); Yousuf Zazai 1/15 (3 overs)

Band-e-Amir Dragons won by 9 wickets
Alokozay Kabul International Cricket Ground, Kabul
Umpires: Bismillah Jan Shinwari and Mehmood Kharotai
Player of the match: Rashid Khan (Band-e-Amir Dragons)

- Band-e-Amir Dragons won the toss and elected to field.
- Perwez Malikzai, Dawlat Khan, Rahmatullah Sahaq (Amo Sharks) and Arif Khan (Band-e-Amir Dragons) all made their T20 debuts.

18 September 2017
Scorecard

Kabul Eagles; 133/9 (20 overs)	v	Band-e-Amir Dragons; 136/5 (18.1 overs)
Karim Sadiq 32 (32); Tendai Chatara 2/14 (4 overs); Shahidullah 2/14 (4 overs)		Shahidullah 51* (75); Karim Sadiq 3/22 (4 overs)

Band-e-Amir Dragons won by 5 wickets
Alokozay Kabul International Cricket Ground, Kabul
Umpires: Ahmed Shah Durrani and Ahmed Shah Pakteen
Player of the match: Shahidullah (Band-e-Amir Dragons)

- Kabul Eagles won the toss and elected to bat.
- Fitratullah Khawari (Band-e-Amir Dragons), Mohammad Ibrahim and Mohammad Sardar (Kabul Eagles) all made their T20 debuts.

== Knockout-stage ==
Qualifier 1
20 September 2017
Scorecard

Mis Ainak Knights; 164/8 (20 overs)	v	Band-e-Amir Dragons; 140 (19.1 overs)
Ihsanullah 43 (29); Tendai Chatara 4/29 (4 overs)		Rahmat Shah 60 (45); Zahir Khan 5/19 (4 overs)

Mis Ainak Knights won by 24 runs
Alokozay Kabul International Cricket Ground, Kabul
Umpires: Izatullah Safi and Mehmood Kharotai
Player of the match: Zahir Khan (Mis Ainak Knights)

- Band-e-Amir Dragons won the toss and elected to field.

Eliminator
20 September 2017
Scorecard

Boost Defenders; 131/9 (20 overs)	v	Kabul Eagles; 132/5 (19.4 overs)
Gulbadin Naib 52 (29); Sayed Abdullah 2/8 (3 overs)		Asghar Stanikzai 39 (28); Zia-ur-Rehman 1/11 (2 overs)

Kabul Eagles won by 5 wickets
Alokozay Kabul International Cricket Ground, Kabul
Umpires: Ahmed Shah Pakteen and Bismillah Jan Shinwari
Player of the match: Karim Sadiq (Kabul Eagles)

- Boost Defenders won the toss and elected to bat.

Qualifier 2
21 September 2017
Scorecard

Band-e-Amir Dragons; 182/3 (20 overs)	v	Kabul Eagles; 168/3 (20 overs)
Shahidullah 42* (39); Fareed Ahmad 2/52 (4 overs)		Zeeshan Maqsood 71 (51); Rashid Khan 1/21 (4 overs)

Band-e-Amir Dragons won by 14 runs
Alokozay Kabul International Cricket Ground, Kabul
Umpires: Ahmed Shah Pakteen and Bismillah Jan Shinwari
Player of the match: Najibullah Zadran (Band-e-Amir Dragons)

- Kabul Eagles won the toss and elected to field.
- Javeed Khan (Band-e-Amir Dragons) and Qais Ahmad (Kabul Eagles) both made their T20 debuts.

Final
22 September 2017
Scorecard

Band-e-Amir Dragons; 158/7 (20 overs)	v	Mis Ainak Knights; 154/7 (20 overs)
Javed Ahmadi 55 (39); Zahir Khan 3/31 (4 overs)		Sikandar Raza 40 (29); Wafadar 1/16 (2 overs)

Band-e-Amir Dragons won by 4 runs
Alokozay Kabul International Cricket Ground, Kabul
Umpires: Ahmed Shah Pakteen and Sarika Prasad
Player of the match: Javed Ahmadi (Band-e-Amir Dragons)

- Band-e-Amir Dragons won the toss and elected to bat.
