= 2024 Nepal Premier League =

Inaugural season of Nepal Premier League

- Logo of 2024 Nepal Premier League
- Dates: 30 November – 21 December 2024
- Administrator: Cricket Association of Nepal
- Cricket format: Twenty20
- Tournament format(s): Round-robin and playoffs
- Champions: Janakpur Bolts (1st title)
- Runners-up: Sudurpaschim Royals
- Participants: 8
- Matches: 32
- Player of the series: Saif Zaib (Sudurpaschim Royals)
- Most runs: Lahiru Milantha (Janakpur Bolts) (293)
- Most wickets: Scott Kuggeleijn (Sudurpaschim Royals) (17); Lalit Rajbanshi (Janakpur Bolts) (17)

The 2024 Nepal Premier League, also known as Siddhartha Bank NPL 2024 for sponsorship reasons, was the inaugural season of the Nepal Premier League, a franchise Twenty20 cricket league in Nepal.

The tournament featured eight teams competing in 32 matches from 30 November to 21 December 2024 (15 Mangsir to 6 Poush 2081 BS).

The final was held in Kirtipur on 21 December and saw Janakpur Bolts defeating Sudurpaschim Royals by 5 wickets to win the first title. Lahiru Milantha of Janakpur Bolts was awarded the man of the match award for his innings of 87 runs from 49 balls. Saif Zaib of the Sudurpaschim Royals was named player of the tournament.

== Auctions and personnel signings ==
The auctions for team ownership was held on September 5, 2024. Pokhara was the most expensive team, costing over NPR 3,57,00,000. For the inaugural NPL season, each team had a salary cap of रू90 lakh (US$60,000) for domestic auction. Eight Marquee players were listed form draw on 14 September 2024. Sandeep Lamichhane, Kushal Malla, Aasif Sheikh, Sompal Kami, Karan KC, Rohit Paudel, Kushal Bhurtel and Dipendra Singh Airee were classified as Marquee players.

The auction was conducted on 6 October 2024 with Aarif Sheikh, Anil Sah, Bhim Sharki, Bibek Yadav, Gulsan Jha, Lalit Rajbanshi, Lokesh Bam, Pratis GC, Sagar Dhakal, Shahab Alam, Surya Tamang and Sundeep Jora winning the highest bid of रू15 lakh (US$10,000). The signing of foreign players was signed based on the franchise's interest and budget.

== Squads ==
The player auction took place on 6 October 2024.

Teams	Head coach	Playing squads
Biratnagar Kings	Kevin O'Brien	Sandeep Lamichhane (c), Basir Ahamad, Ismat Alam, Lokesh Bam (wk), Dipak Bohara, Subash Bhandari, Naren Bhatta, Scott Edwards, Pratish GC, Mrinal Gurung, Martin Guptill, Nicholas Kirton, Aqib Ilyas, Anil Kharel, Kamal Khatri, Jitendra Mukhiya, Rajesh Pulami, Chris Sole
Chitwan Rhinos	Umesh Patwal	Kushal Malla (c), ~~Kamal Singh Airee~~, Deepak Bohara, Rijan Dhakal, Basil Hameed, ~~Marchant de Lange~~, Jan Nicol Loftie-Eaton, Hassan Eisakhil, Santosh Karki, Luc Benkenstein, Gautam KC, Sallahuddin Khan, Ranjit Kumar, Bipin Rawal (wk), Ravi Bopara, Amar Routela, Nar Sarki, Dipesh Shrestha, Sohail Tanveer, Sharad Vesawkar
Janakpur Bolts	Pubudu Dassanayake	Anil Sah (c, wk), Hemant Dhami, Shubh Kansakar, Kishore Mahato, Sher Malla, Lahiru Milantha (wk), Ben Mike, Mohammad Mohsin, James Neesham, ~~Sohaib Maqsood~~, Lalit Rajbanshi, Rupesh Singh, Aasif Sheikh (wk), Bishal Shusling, Tul Thapa, Harsh Thaker, Aakash Tripathi, Joshua Tromp, Arniko Yadav
Karnali Yaks	Gyanendra Malla	Sompal Kami (c), Will Bosisto, Mousom Dhakal, Shikhar Dhawan, Deepak Dumre, Rit Gautam, Arjun Gharti (wk), Babar Hayat, Gulshan Jha, Dev Khanal, Bhuvan Karki, Jaykishan Kolsawala, Zeeshan Maqsood, Dipendra Rawat, Bipin Sharma, Unish Singh, ~~Hussain Talat,~~ Nandan Yadav, Chadwick Walton (wk)
Kathmandu Gurkhas	Basanta Shahi	Karan KC (c), Shahab Alam, Dan Douthwaite, Gerhard Erasmus, Stephen Eskinazi, Dipesh Kandel, Krishna Karki, Krish Karki, Rashid Khan, Bibek KC, Michael Levitt, Sumit Maharjan, Shankar Rana, Raju Rijal (wk), Bhim Sharki, Pratik Shrestha, Nathan Sowter
Lumbini Lions	Nandan Phadnis	Rohit Paudel (c), Bikash Aagri, Dinesh Adhikari, Tilak Bhandari, Ben Cutting, Unmukt Chand, Abhishesh Gautam, Ashutosh Ghiraiya, Durgesh Gupta, Sundeep Jora, Aarif Khan, Tom Moores (wk), Arjun Saud (wk), Ramon Simmonds, Surya Tamang, Bibek Yadav, Saad Bin Zafar
Pokhara Avengers	Rajiv Kumar	Kushal Bhurtel (c), Sudip Aryal, Aakash Chand, Matt Critchley, Trit Raj Das, Sagar Dhakal, ~~Sunam Gautam~~, Andries Gous (wk), Aakarshit Gomel, Amrit Gurung, Narayan Joshi, Dinesh Kharel, Bipin Khatri, Michael Leask, ~~Bas de Leede~~, Zen Malik, Dilip Nath (wk), ~~Anderson Phillip~~, Raymon Reifer, Harishankar Shah, Kiran Thagunna
Sudurpaschim Royals	Jagat Tamata	Dipendra Singh Airee (c), Binod Bhandari (wk), Bhoj Raj Bhatta, Dilpreet Bajwa, Abinash Bohara, Khadak Bohora, Naresh Budhayer, Basant Khatri, Arjun Kumal, Scott Kuggeleijn, Brandon McMullen, ~~Rohan Mustafa~~, Ishan Pandey, Naren Saud, Aarif Sheikh, Amit Shrestha, Harmeet Singh, Saif Zaib

== Venue ==
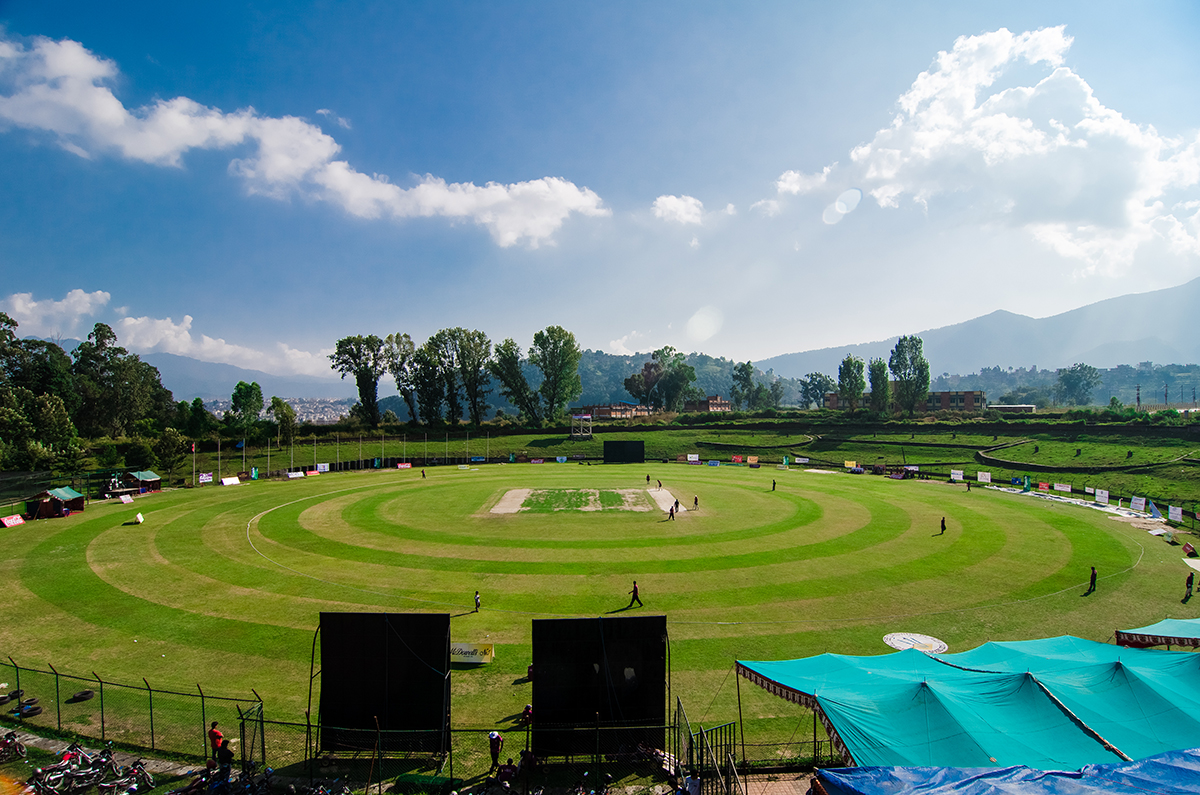
The Tribhuvan University International Cricket Ground

All matches were played at Tribhuvan University International Cricket Ground at Kirtipur in Kathmandu.

== Practice matches ==
Before the start of league stage four practice matches were played at Mulpani Cricket Ground.

== Teams and standings ==
=== Points table ===
Pos	Team	Pld	W	L	NR	Pts	NRR	Qualification
1	Sudurpaschim Royals (R)	7	6	1	0	12	2.087	Advance to Qualifier 1
2	Janakpur Bolts (C)	7	5	2	0	10	0.164	Advance to Qualifier 1
3	Chitwan Rhinos (4th)	7	4	3	0	8	0.634	Advance to Eliminator
4	Karnali Yaks (3rd)	7	4	3	0	8	−0.184	Advance to Eliminator
5	Kathmandu Gorkhas	7	4	3	0	8	−0.321	Eliminated
6	Biratnagar Kings	7	2	5	0	4	−0.703	Eliminated
7	Pokhara Avengers	7	2	5	0	4	−1.332	Eliminated
8	Lumbini Lions	7	1	6	0	2	−0.498	Eliminated

Source: ESPNcricinfo
(C) Champions; (R) Runners-up

(C) = Eventual champion; (R) = Runner-up.

=== Win-loss table ===
Below is a summary of results for each team's seven regular season matches, plus finals where applicable, in chronological order. A team's opponent for any given match is listed above the margin of victory/defeat.

Team	League stage							Play-offs				Pos.
Team	1	2	3	4	5	6	7	E	Q1	Q2	F	Pos.
Biratnagar Kings (BK)	JB; 8 wickets	SR; 90 runs	LL; 2 wickets	KY; 7 runs	PA; Super Over	CR; 51 runs	KG; 1 wicket	X	X	X	X	6th
Chitwan Rhinos (CR)	KG; 5 wickets	PA; 87 runs	KY; 6 wickets	SR; 33 runs	LL; 33 runs	BK; 51 runs	JB; 32 runs	KY; 21 runs	X	X	X	3rd (E)
Janakpur Bolts (JB)	BK; 8 wickets	KY; 8 wickets	PA; 7 wickets	LL; 1 run	SR; 72 runs	KG; 5 wickets	CR; 32 runs	→	SR; 8 wickets	KY; 2 wickets	SR; 5 wickets	2nd (C)
Karnali Yaks (KY)	JB; 8 wickets	KG; 3 wicket	CR; 6 wickets	BK; 7 runs	PA; 7 wickets	LL; 5 runs	SR; 6 wickets	CR; 21 runs	X	JB; 2 wickets	X	4th (Q2)
Kathmandu Gurkhas (KG)	CR; 5 wickets	KY; 3 wickets	SR; 73 runs	LL; 18 runs	JB; 5 wickets	PA; 6 wickets	BK; 1 wicket	X	X	X	X	5th
Lumbini Lions (LL)	BK; 2 wickets	PA; 10 wickets	SR; 45 runs	JB; 1 run	CR; 33 runs	KG; 18 runs	KY; 5 runs	X	X	X	X	8th
Pokhara Avengers (PA)	CR; 87 runs	JB; 7 wickets	LL; 10 wickets	KY; 7 wickets	BK; Super Over	KG; 6 wickets	SR; 5 runs	X	X	X	X	7th
Sudurpaschim Royals (SR)	BK; 90 runs	KG; 73 runs	LL; 45 runs	CR; 33 runs	JB; 72 runs	PA; 5 runs	KY; 6 wickets	→	JB; 8 wickets	→	JB; 5 wickets	1st (RU)

Team's results→	Won	Tied	Lost	N/R

=== Match summary ===
Team	Group matches							Playoffs		
Team	1	2	3	4	5	6	7	Q1/E	Q2	F
Biratnagar Kings	0	0	2	2	2	4	4			
Chitwan Rhinos	2	4	4	6	6	6	8	L		
Janakpur Bolts	2	4	6	8	8	10	10	L	W	W
Karnali Yaks	0	0	2	4	6	8	8	W	L	
Kathmandu Gurkhas	0	2	2	4	4	6	8			
Lumbini Lions	0	0	0	0	2	2	2			
Pokhara Avengers	0	0	2	2	4	4	4			
Sudurpaschim Royals	2	4	6	6	8	10	12	W		L

Win	Loss	No result

- Note: The total points at the end of each group match are listed.
- Note: Click on the points (group matches) or W/L (playoffs) to see the match summary.

Visitor team →	BK	CR	JB	KY	KG	LL	PA	SR
Home team ↓	BK	CR	JB	KY	KG	LL	PA	SR
Biratnagar Kings		Biratnagar; 51 runs	Janakpur; 8 wickets		Kathmandu; 1 run	Biratnagar; 2 wickets		
Chitwan Rhinos			Chitwan; 32 runs			Lumbini; 33 runs	Chitwan; 87 runs	
Janakpur Bolts				Janakpur; 8 wickets	Janakpur; 5 wickets	Janakpur; 1 run		Sudurpaschim; 72 runs
Karnali Yaks	Karnali; 7 runs	Karnali; 6 wickets			Kathmandu; 3 wickets		Karnali; 7 wickets	
Kathmandu Gurkhas		Chitwan; 5 wickets				Kathmandu; 18 runs		Sudurpaschim; 73 runs
Lumbini Lions				Karnali; 5 runs			Pokhara; 10 wickets	Sudurpaschim; 45 runs
Pokhara Avengers	Pokhara; Super Over		Janakpur; 7 wickets		Kathmandu; 6 wickets			Sudurpaschim; 5 runs
Sudurpaschim Royals	Sudurpaschim; 90 runs	Chitwan; 33 runs		Sudurpaschim; 6 wickets				

Home team won	Visitor team won

- Note: Results listed are according to the home (horizontal) and visitor (vertical) teams.
- Note: Click on a result to see a summary of the match.

== League stage ==
The fixture was released on 18 November 2024.

Match 1
30 November 2024
12:30
Scorecard

Biratnagar Kings; 127 (19 overs)	v	Janakpur Bolts; 131/2 (15.3 overs)
Martin Guptil 55 (43); Lalit Rajbanshi 3/28 (4 overs)		Lahiru Milantha 75* (53); Pratis GC 1/14 (2 overs)

Janakpur Bolts won by 8 wickets
Tribhuvan University International Cricket Ground, Kirtipur
Umpires: Vinay Kumar Jha (Nep) and Durga Subedi (Nep)
Player of the match: Lahiru Milantha (Janakpur Bolts)

- Janakpur Bolts won the toss and elected to field.

Match 2
2 December 2024
09:00
Scorecard

Kathmandu Gurkhas; 111/9 (20 overs)	v	Chitwan Rhinos; 114/5 (17.1 overs)
Sumit Maharjan 29 (41); Sohail Tanvir 5/21 (4 overs)		Santosh Karki 28* (31); Shahab Alam 3/20 (4 overs)

Chitwan Rhinos won by 5 wickets
Tribhuvan University International Cricket Ground, Kirtipur
Umpires: Himal Giri (Nep) and Buddhi Pradhan (Nep)
Player of the match: Sohail Tanvir (Chitwan Rhinos)

- Chitwan Rhinos won the toss and elected to field.
- Sohail Tanvir (Chitwan Rhinos) became the first player to take a five-wicket haul in the Nepal Premier League.

Match 3
2 December 2024
13:00
Scorecard

Karnali Yaks; 141/7 (20 overs)	v	Janakpur Bolts; 142/2 (15.1 overs)
Gulsan Jha 36 (27); Mohammad Mohsin 2/14 (4 overs)		Anil Sah 62* (42); Mousom Dhakal 1/25 (2.1 overs)

Janakpur Bolts won by 8 wickets
Tribhuvan University International Cricket Ground, Kirtipur
Umpires: Rashid Riaz (Pak) and Bismillah Jan Shinwari (Afg)
Player of the match: Anil Sah (Janakpur Bolts)

- Karnali Yaks won the toss and elected to bat.

Match 4
3 December 2024
09:00
Scorecard

Sudurpaschim Royals; 182/7 (20 overs)	v	Biratnagar Kings; 92 (16.1 overs)
Dipendra Singh Airee 57* (24); Anil Kharel 3/26 (4 overs)		Basir Ahamad 24 (28); Abinash Bohara 3/17 (3 overs)

Sudurpaschim Royals won by 90 runs
Tribhuvan University International Cricket Ground, Kirtipur
Umpires: Himal Giri (Nep) and Durga Subedi (Nep)
Player of the match: Dipendra Singh Airee (Sudurpaschim Royals)

- Biratnagar Kings won the toss and elected to field.

Match 5
3 December 2024
13:00
Scorecard

Chitwan Rhinos; 161/7 (20 overs)	v	Pokhara Avengers; 74 (13.2 overs)
Ravi Bopara 51 (38); Bas de Leede 2/20 (4 overs)		Narayan Joshi 30 (24); Sohail Tanvir 3/6 (3 overs)

Chitwan Rhinos won by 87 runs
Tribhuvan University International Cricket Ground, Kirtipur
Umpires: Vinay Kumar Jha (Nep) and Bismillah Jan Shinwari (Afg)
Player of the match: Rijan Dhakal (Chitwan Rhinos)

- Pokhara Avengers won the toss and elected to field.

Match 6
4 December 2024
09:00
Scorecard

Karnali Yaks; 149/5 (20 overs)	v	Kathmandu Gurkhas; 153/7 (19.3 overs)
Shikhar Dhawan 72* (51); Gerhard Erasmus 2/29 (4 overs)		Sumit Maharjan 40* (37); Bipin Sharma 1/18 (4 overs)

Kathmandu Gurkhas won by 3 wickets
Tribhuvan University International Cricket Ground, Kirtipur
Umpires: Himal Giri (Nep) and Rashid Riaz (Pak)
Player of the match: Sumit Maharjan (Kathmandu Gurkhas)

- Kathmandu Gurkhas won the toss and elected to field.

Match 7
4 December 2024
13:00
Scorecard

Lumbini Lions; 191/7 (20 overs)	v	Biratnagar Kings; 193/8 (19.5 overs)
Rohit Paudel 46 (29); Ismat Alam 1/21 (2 overs)		Lokesh Bam 71 (47); Durgesh Gupta 3/21 (4 overs)

Biratnagar Kings won by 2 wickets
Tribhuvan University International Cricket Ground, Kirtipur
Umpires: Buddhi Pradhan (Nep) and Bismillah Jan Shinwari (Afg)
Player of the match: Lokesh Bam (Biratnagar Kings)

- Biratnagar Kings won the toss and elected to field.

Match 8
5 December 2024
09:00
Scorecard

Pokhara Avengers; 138/7 (20 overs)	v	Janakpur Bolts; 143/3 (17.1 overs)
Matt Critchley 35 (30); Lalit Rajbanshi 3/31 (4 overs)		Lahiru Milantha 45 (32); Bipin Khatri 1/6 (1 over)

Janakpur Bolts won by 7 wickets
Tribhuvan University International Cricket Ground, Kirtipur
Umpires: Vinay Kumar Jha (Nep) and Durga Subedi (Nep)
Player of the match: James Neesham (Janakpur Bolts)

- Janakpur Bolts won the toss and elected to field.

Match 9
5 December 2024
13:00
Scorecard

Sudurpaschim Royals; 167/6 (20 overs)	v	Kathmandu Gurkhas; 94 (15.4 overs)
Brandon McMullen 53 (36); Rashid Khan 2/20 (4 overs)		Stephen Eskinazi 37 (33); Naren Saud 5/19 (3.5 overs)

Sudurpaschim Royals won by 73 runs
Tribhuvan University International Cricket Ground, Kirtipur
Umpires: Himal Giri (Nep) and Rashid Riaz (Pak)
Player of the match: Naren Saud (Sudurpaschim Royals)

- Kathmandu Gurkhas won the toss and elected to field.

Match 10
6 December 2024
09:00
Scorecard

Chitwan Rhinos; 130/7 (20 overs)	v	Karnali Yaks; 132/4 (19.5 overs)
Ravi Bopara 59* (40); Bipin Sharma 3/21 (4 overs)		Shikhar Dhawan 45 (41); Kushal Malla 1/13 (4 overs)

Karnali Yaks won by 6 wickets
Tribhuvan University International Cricket Ground, Kirtipur
Umpires: Bismillah Jan Shinwari (Afg) and Durga Subedi (Nep)
Player of the match: Bipin Sharma (Karnali Yaks)

- Karnali Yaks won the toss and elected to field.

Match 11
6 December 2024
13:00
Scorecard

Lumbini Lions; 170/4 (20 overs)	v	Pokhara Avengers; 176/0 (16.4 overs)
Rohit Paudel 95 (59); Bipin Khatri 2/18 (3 overs)		Andries Gous 104* (55)

Pokhara Avengers won by 10 wickets
Tribhuvan University International Cricket Ground, Kirtipur
Umpires: Himal Giri (Nep) and Buddhi Pradhan (Nep)
Player of the match: Andries Gous (Pokhara Avengers)

- Lumbini Lions won the toss and elected to bat.
- Andries Gous (Pokhara Avengers) became the first player to score a century in the Nepal Premier League.

Match 12
7 December 2024
09:00
Scorecard

Sudurpaschim Royals; 187/4 (20 overs)	v	Lumbini Lions; 142/9 (20 overs)
Saif Zaib 90 (61); Ramon Simmonds 2/32 (4 overs)		Bibek Yadav 77* (54); Brandon McMullen 3/21 (4 overs)

Sudurpaschim Royals won by 45 runs
Tribhuvan University International Cricket Ground, Kirtipur
Umpires: Buddhi Pradhan (Nep) and Rashid Riaz (Pak)
Player of the match: Saif Zaib (Sudurpaschim Royals)

- Lumbini Lions won the toss and elected to field.

Match 13
7 December 2024
13:00
Scorecard

Karnali Yaks; 133 (20 overs)	v	Biratnagar Kings; 126/8 (20 overs)
Will Bosisto 66 (49); Pratis GC 4/17 (4 overs)		Nicholas Kirton 40 (39); Nandan Yadav 3/19 (4 overs)

Karnali Yaks won by 7 runs
Tribhuvan University International Cricket Ground, Kirtipur
Umpires: Himal Giri (Nep) and Vinay Kumar Jha (Nep)
Player of the match: Will Bosisto (Karnali Yaks)

- Biratnagar Kings won the toss and elected to field.

Match 14
8 December 2024
09:00
Scorecard

Janakpur Bolts; 136/9 (20 overs)	v	Lumbini Lions; 135/8 (20 overs)
Anil Sah 45 (39); Abhishesh Gautam 3/20 (4 overs)		Rohit Paudel 35 (38); Harsh Thaker 5/23 (4 overs)

Janakpur Bolts won by 1 run
Tribhuvan University International Cricket Ground, Kirtipur
Umpires: Himal Giri (Nep) and Durga Subedi (Nep)
Player of the match: Harsh Thaker (Janakpur Bolts)

- Lumbini Lions won the toss and elected to field.

Match 15
8 December 2024
13:00
Scorecard

Chitwan Rhinos; 164/5 (20 overs)	v	Sudurpaschim Royals; 131 (18.2 overs)
Hassan Eisakhil 65 (52); Scott Kuggeleijn 2/29 (4 overs)		Ishan Pandey 35 (28); Amar Routela 2/9 (1 over)

Chitwan Rhinos won by 33 runs
Tribhuvan University International Cricket Ground, Kirtipur
Umpires: Rashid Riaz (Pak) and Bismillah Jan Shinwari (Afg)
Player of the match: Hassan Eisakhil (Chitwan Rhinos)

- Chitwan Rhinos won the toss and elected to bat.

Match 16
10 December 2024
09:00
Scorecard

Lumbini Lions; 167/6 (20 overs)	v	Chitwan Rhinos; 134/8 (20 overs)
Rohit Paudel 80 (57); Rijan Dhakal 3/29 (4 overs)		Luc Benkenstein 31 (29); Rohit Paudel 4/17 (4 overs)

Lumbini Lions won by 33 runs
Tribhuvan University International Cricket Ground, Kirtipur
Umpires: Himal Giri (Nep) and Buddhi Pradhan (Nep)
Player of the match: Rohit Paudel (Lumbini Lions)

- Chitwan Rhinos won the toss and elected to field.

Match 17
10 December 2024
13:00
Scorecard

Pokhara Avengers; 103 (16.3 overs)	v	Karnali Yaks; 106/3 (15 overs)
Dinesh Kharel 26 (19); Will Bosisto 6/28 (4 overs)		Gulsan Jha 49* (37); Bipin Khatri 1/12 (3 overs)

Karnali Yaks won by 7 wickets
Tribhuvan University International Cricket Ground, Kirtipur
Umpires: Sanjay Gurung (Nep) and Bismillah Jan Shinwari (Afg)
Player of the match: Will Bosisto (Karnali Yaks)

- Pokhara Avengers won the toss and elected to bat.

Match 18
11 December 2024
09:00
Scorecard

Sudurpaschim Royals; 123/9 (20 overs)	v	Janakpur Bolts; 51 (12.1 overs)
Binod Bhandari 33 (37); Kishore Mahato 4/35 (4 overs)		Joshua Tromp 13 (13); Harmeet Singh 2/2 (4 overs)

Sudurpaschim Royals won by 72 runs
Tribhuvan University International Cricket Ground, Kirtipur
Umpires: Vinay Kumar Jha (Nep) and Durga Subedi (Nep)
Player of the match: Ishan Pandey (Sudurpaschim Royals)

- Janakpur Bolts won the toss and elected to field.

Match 19
11 December 2024
13:00
Scorecard

Kathmandu Gurkhas; 103 (19.2 overs)	v	Lumbini Lions; 85 (19.2 overs)
Bhim Sharki 31 (40); Saad Bin Zafar 3/21 (4 overs)		Sundeep Jora 26 (29); Karan KC 4/16 (4 overs)

Kathmandu Gurkhas won by 18 runs
Tribhuvan University International Cricket Ground, Kirtipur
Umpires: Himal Giri (Nep) and Rashid Riaz (Pak)
Player of the match: Karan KC (Kathmandu Gurkhas)

- Kathmandu Gurkhas won the toss and elected to bat.

Match 20
12 December 2024
09:00
Scorecard

Pokhara Avengers; 139/7 (20 overs)	v	Biratnagar Kings; 139/6 (20 overs)
Scott Edwards 45 (35); Sagar Dhakal 2/15 (4 overs)		Andries Gous 39 (27); Pratis GC 4/18 (4 overs)

Match tied (Pokhara Avengers won the Super Over)
Tribhuvan University International Cricket Ground, Kirtipur
Umpires: Vinay Kumar Jha (Nep) and Bismillah Jan Shinwari (Afg)
Player of the match: Raymon Reifer (Pokhara Avengers)

- Biratnagar Kings won the toss and elected to bat.
- Super Over: Pokhara Avengers 18/0, Biratnagar Kings 5/0

Match 21
12 December 2024
13:00
Scorecard

Kathmandu Gurkhas; 101 (19.3 overs)	v	Janakpur Bolts; 104/5 (15.5 overs)
Gerhard Erasmus 20 (22); Lalit Rajbanshi 3/8 (4 overs)		James Neesham 27 (17); Karan KC 2/10 (3 overs)

Janakpur Bolts won by 5 wickets
Tribhuvan University International Cricket Ground, Kirtipur
Umpires: Himal Giri (Nep) and Sanjay Gurung (Nep)
Player of the match: Lalit Rajbanshi (Janakpur Bolts)

- Kathmandu Gurkhas won the toss and elected to bat.

Match 22
13 December 2024
09:00
Scorecard

Karnali Yaks; 128/8 (20 overs)	v	Lumbini Lions; 123/7 (20 overs)
Will Bosisto 44 (30); Bikash Aagri 3/14 (2 overs)		Tom Moores 36 (35); Zeeshan Maqsood 2/12 (3 overs)

Karnali Yaks won by 5 runs
Tribhuvan University International Cricket Ground, Kirtipur
Umpires: Himal Giri (Nep) and Rashid Riaz (Pak)
Player of the match: Will Bosisto (Karnali Yaks)

- Lumbini Lions won the toss and elected to field.

Match 23
13 December 2024
13:00
Scorecard

Biratnagar Kings; 181/5 (20 overs)	v	Chitwan Rhinos; 130/6 (20 overs)
Basir Ahamad 68* (44); Rijan Dhakal 2/40 (4 overs)		Amar Routela 42 (29); Sandeep Lamichhane 2/28 (4 overs)

Biratnagar Kings won by 51 runs
Tribhuvan University International Cricket Ground, Kirtipur
Umpires: Buddhi Pradhan (Nep) and Bismillah Jan Shinwari (Afg)
Player of the match: Basir Ahamad (Biratnagar Kings)

- Biratnagar Kings won the toss and elected to bat.

Match 24
14 December 2024
09:00
Scorecard

Pokhara Avengers; 138/8 (20 overs)	v	Kathmandu Gurkhas; 142/4 (14.1 overs)
Raymon Reifer 41* (30); Karan KC 3/24 (4 overs)		Stephen Eskinazi 60 (34); Bipin Khatri 3/19 (3 overs)

Kathmandu Gurkhas won by 6 wickets
Tribhuvan University International Cricket Ground, Kirtipur
Umpires: Rashid Riaz (Pak) and Durga Subedi (Nep)
Player of the match: Stephen Eskinazi (Kathmandu Gurkhas)

- Kathmandu Gurkhas won the toss and elected to field.

Match 25
14 December 2024
13:00
Scorecard

Chitwan Rhinos; 180/5 (20 overs)	v	Janakpur Bolts; 148 (18 overs)
Kushal Malla 72 (41); Lalit Rajbanshi 2/11 (4 overs)		James Neesham 65 (24); Rijan Dhakal 2/19 (3 overs)

Chitwan Rhinos won by 32 runs
Tribhuvan University International Cricket Ground, Kirtipur
Umpires: Sanjay Gurung (Nep) and Vinay Kumar Jha (Nep)
Player of the match: Kushal Malla (Chitwan Rhinos)

- Chitwan Rhinos won the toss and elected to bat.

Match 26
15 December 2024
09:00
Scorecard

Biratnagar Kings; 117 (19.5 overs)	v	Kathmandu Gurkhas; 120/9 (18.1 overs)
Rajesh Pulami 25 (21); Gerhard Erasmus 3/17 (4 overs)		Pratik Shrestha 39 (34); Sandeep Lamichhane 3/19 (4 overs)

Kathmandu Gurkhas won by 1 wicket
Tribhuvan University International Cricket Ground, Kirtipur
Umpires: Buddhi Pradhan (Nep) and Durga Subedi (Nep)
Player of the match: Dipesh Kandel (Kathmandu Gurkhas)

- Kathmandu Gurkhas won the toss and elected to field.

Match 27
15 December 2024
13:00
Scorecard

Sudurpaschim Royals; 153/7 (20 overs)	v	Pokhara Avengers; 148 (19.4 overs)
Aarif Sheikh 42* (38); Kushal Bhurtel 2/27 (4 overs)		Andries Gous 36 (21); Scott Kuggeleijn 5/18 (3.4 overs)

Sudurpaschim Royals won by 5 runs
Tribhuvan University International Cricket Ground, Kirtipur
Umpires: Rashid Riaz (Pak) and Bismillah Jan Shinwari (Afg)
Player of the match: Scott Kuggeleijn (Sudurpaschim Royals)

- Pokhara Avengers won the toss and elected field.

Match 28
16 December 2024
09:00
Scorecard

Karnali Yaks; 101 (20 overs)	v	Sudurpaschim Royals; 105/4 (15.2 overs)
Zeeshan Maqsood 30 (35); Harmeet Singh 3/17 (10 overs)		Dipendra Singh Airee 38 (29); Nandan Yadav 1/18 (2 overs)

Sudurpaschim Royals won by 6 wickets
Tribhuvan University International Cricket Ground, Kirtipur
Umpires: Himal Giri (Nep) and Sanjay Gurung (Nep)
Player of the match: Dipendra Singh Airee (Sudurpaschim Royals)

- Sudurpaschim Royals won the toss and elected to field.

== Playoffs ==
The playoffs were held from 18 to 21 December 2024.

=== Bracket ===
Qualifier 1
18 December 2024 - Kirtipur
1	Sudurpaschim Royals	141/2 (18.3 overs)
2	Janakpur Bolts	139/9 (20 overs)
Eliminator
18 December 2024 - Kirtipur
3	Chitwan Rhinos	154/9 (20 overs)
4	Karnali Yaks	175/6 (20 overs)

Qualifier 2
19 December 2024 - Kirtipur
Q1L	Janakpur Bolts	119/8 (19 overs)
EW	Karnali Yaks	118/9 (20 overs)

Final
21 December 2024 - Kirtipur
Q1W	Sudurpaschim Royals	184/9 (20 overs)
Q2W	Janakpur Bolts	185/5 (19.2 overs)

=== Eliminator ===
Eliminator
18 December 2024
09:00
Scorecard

Karnali Yaks; 175/6 (20 overs)	v	Chitwan Rhinos; 154/9 (20 overs)
Jaykishan Kolsawala 53 (39); Sohail Tanvir 2/24 (4 overs)		Ravi Bopara 53 (34); Zeeshan Maqsood 3/26 (4 overs)

Karnali Yaks won by 21 runs
Tribhuvan University International Cricket Ground, Kirtipur
Umpires: Sanjay Gurung (Nep) and Rashid Riaz (Pak)
Player of the match: Chadwick Walton (Karnali Yaks)

- Chitwan Rhinos won the toss and elected to field.

=== Qualifier 1 ===
Qualifier 1
18 December 2024
13:00
Scorecard

Janakpur Bolts; 139/9 (20 overs)	v	Sudurpaschim Royals; 141/2 (18.3 overs)
James Neesham 45 (23); Dipendra Singh Airee 3/29 (4 overs)		Binod Bhandari 58* (55); Kishore Mahato 1/16 (4 overs)

Sudurpaschim Royals won by 8 wickets
Tribhuvan University International Cricket Ground, Kirtipur
Umpires: Buddhi Pradhan (Nep) and Bismillah Jan Shinwari (Afg)
Player of the match: Binod Bhandari (Sudurpaschim Royals)

- Janakpur Bolts won the toss and elected to bat.

=== Qualifier 2 ===
Qualifier 2
19 December 2024
12:30
Scorecard

Karnali Yaks; 118/9 (20 overs)	v	Janakpur Bolts; 119/8 (19 overs)
Gulsan Jha 25 (20); Mohammad Mohsin 2/14 (4 overs)		James Neesham 45 (17); Bipin Sharma 3/17 (4 overs)

Janakpur Bolts won by 2 wickets
Tribhuvan University International Cricket Ground, Kirtipur
Umpires: Vinay Kumar Jha (Nep) and Durga Subedi (Nep)
Player of the match: James Neesham (Janakpur Bolts)

- Janakpur Bolts won the toss and elected to field.

== Final ==
2024 Nepal Premier League final
- Event: 2024 Nepal Premier League
Sudurpaschim Royals	Janakpur Bolts
184/9	185/5
20 overs	19.2 overs
- Janakpur Bolts won by 5 wickets
- Date: 21 December 2024
- Venue: Tribhuvan University International Cricket Ground, Kirtipur
- Player of the match: Lahiru Milantha (JB)
- Umpires: Bismillah Jan Shinwari (Afghanistan); Rashid Riaz (Pakistan)
- Attendance: 14,000

The 2024 Nepal Premier League final was played on 21 December 2024 at the Tribhuvan University International Cricket Ground in Kirtipur. Sudurpaschim Royals qualified for the finals after their win in Qualifier 1. They competed with Janakpur Bolts, who qualified for the finals after their win in Qualifier 2.

After winning the toss, Sudurpaschim Royals elected to bat first and managed to score 184 runs in 20 overs with a loss of 9 wickets. The Janakpur Bolts chased the target in 19.2 overs and won the match by five wickets, thus winning their first NPL title. JB player Lahiru Milantha was named as the player of the match for scoring 87 runs. Saif Zaib (SR) was named as the player of the season for scoring 275 runs and taking 12 wickets throughout the tournament.

=== Road to the final ===
Sudurpaschim Royals had a successful league stage with only 1 loss against Chitwan Rhinos. They won the rest 6 matches garnering a total of 12 points finishing atop the league table. They defeated Janakpur Bolts in Qualifier 1 to gain their place in the Final.

Janakpur Bolts finished second in the league table winning 5 games and losing 2 games against Sudurpaschim Royals and Chitwan Rhinos to end with a total of 10 points. They again lost the Qualifier 1 to Sudurpaschim Royals and had to defeat Karnali Yaks in Qualifier 2 for a place in the Final. Source: ESPNcricinfo

Sudurpaschim Royals
vs
Janakpur Bolts
League Stage
Opponent
Scorecard
Result
Points
Match No.
Opponent
Scorecard
Result
Points
Biratnagar Kings
3 December 2024
Won
2
1
Biratnagar Kings
30 November 2024
Won
2
Kathmandu Gurkhas
5 December 2024
Won
4
2
Karnali Yaks
2 December 2024
Won
4
Lumbini Lions
7 December 2024
Won
6
3
Pokhara Avengers
5 December 2024
Won
6
Chitwan Rhinos
8 December 2024
Lost
6
4
Lumbini Lions
8 December 2024
Won
8
Janakpur Bolts
11 December 2024
Won
8
5
Sudurpaschim Royals
11 December 2024
Lost
8
Pokhara Avengers
15 December 2024
Won
10
6
Kathmandu Gurkhas
12 December 2024
Won
10
Karnali Yaks
16 December 2024
Won
12
7
Chitwan Rhinos
14 December 2024
Lost
10
Playoff stage

Qualifier 1
18 December 2024 - Kirtipur
1	Sudurpaschim Royals	141/2 (18.3 overs)
2	Janakpur Bolts	139/9 (20 overs)
Eliminator
18 December 2024 - Kirtipur
3	Chitwan Rhinos	154/9 (20 overs)
4	Karnali Yaks	175/6 (20 overs)

Qualifier 2
19 December 2024 - Kirtipur
Q1L	Janakpur Bolts	119/8 (19 overs)
EW	Karnali Yaks	118/9 (20 overs)

Final
21 December 2024 - Kirtipur
Q1W	Sudurpaschim Royals	184/9 (20 overs)
Q2W	Janakpur Bolts	185/5 (19.2 overs)

Opponent
Scorecard
Result

Opponent
Scorecard
Result
Janakpur Bolts
18 December 2024
Won
Q1
Sudurpaschim Royals
18 December 2024
Lost
Qualified for the finals
Q2
Karnali Yaks
19 December 2024
Won
2024 Nepal Premier League final

==== Match officials ====
- On-field umpires: Bismillah Jan Shinwari (Afg) and Rashid Riaz (Pak)
- Third umpire: Buddhi Pradhan (Nep)
- Reserve umpire: Sanjay Sigdel (Nep)
- Match referee: Manu Nayyar (Ind)
- Toss: Sudurpaschim Royals won the toss and elected to bat.

==== Summary ====
Final
21 December 2024
12:30
Scorecard

Sudurpaschim Royals; 184/9 (20 overs)	v	Janakpur Bolts; 185/5 (19.2 overs)
Saif Zaib 69 (43); Kishore Mahato 3/25 (3 overs)		Lahiru Milantha 87 (49); Saif Zaib 1/14 (3 overs)

Janakpur Bolts won by 5 wickets
Tribhuvan University International Cricket Ground, Kirtipur
Umpires: Bismillah Jan Shinwari (Afg) and Rashid Riaz (Pak)
Player of the match: Lahiru Milantha (Janakpur Bolts)

- Sudurpaschim Royals won the toss and elected to bat.

==== Sudurpaschim Royals innings ====
Sudurpaschim Royals (SR) won the toss and elected to bat. The team had early start. Both opening batters, Saif Zaib and Binod Bhandari smashed bolwer till first 10 overs. Saif Zaib was the first to fall, bowled by Nepalese fast bowler Kishore Mahato for 69 runs in the twelfth over. Nepalese batter Binod Bhandari followed soon after, clean bowled for 41 runs off Left-arm spiner Lalit Rajbanshi's bowling. SR's top order continued to falter, with Harmeet Singh scoring 14 runs before being caught off Mohsin's bowling, leaving SR at 143 for the loss of 3 wickets in the fifteenth over.

Scottish Brandon McMullen tried to stabilize the innings, scoring 14 runs off 12 balls, but he too fell, bowled off Kiwi' all-rounder James Neesham's bowling. Captain Dipendra Singh Airee added 9 runs before being dismissed by spiner Mohammad Mohsin, while Kiwi Scott Kuggeleijn contributed 13 runs before also falling to Mahato.Ishan Pandey, managed 6 runs off 2 balls, including one four, but his effort was cut short when he was runout off Mohsin. Naresh Budayair managed 8 runs, including one six, before being caught pacer Mahato's bowling. Aarif Sheikh and Naren Saud did not add much, with Sheikh being caught to leg spinner Mohsin for 1 and Saud remaining not out on 1.

JB's bowling attack was led by Kishore Mahato, who claimed 3 wickets for 25 runs. Mohammad Mohsin took 3 wickets for 40 runs. Lalit Rajbanshi took 1 wicket for just 15 runs with lowest economy, while James Neesham matched Rajbanshi with 1 wickets for 44 runs. Harsh Thaker and Sher Malla unabled to picke up a wicket, conceding 33 and 25 runs respectively. SR's innings included 8 extras, with their overall run rate of 9.2 at the end.

==== Janakpur Bolts innings ====
Janakpur Bolts (JB) had a good start to the chase and both the openers Lahiru Milantha and Aasif Sheikh were looking in great form. Sheikh scored a quick 33 off 19 balls before being caught by Brandon McMullen off Saif Zaib' bowling in the seventh over. Mohammad Mohsin joined Milantha, but unable to stood on crease as he was dismissed cheaply by Ishan Pandey. This brought Harsh Thaker to the crease, who, alongside opener Milantha, took control of the chase. Milantha scored 87 runs off 49 balls, including nine fours and four sixes before eventually being dismissed in the sixteenth over, caught and bowled by Scott Kuggeleijn. Later, James Neesham and Thaker tried to stabilize the innings and took the score to 176 but as the run rate went down, Neesham while trying to score a boundary was dismissed by captain Dipendra Singh Airee on 4. Soon, Aakash Tripathi were also cheaply dismissed by Airee through runout. Thaker continued his innings after the loss of Tripathi, reaching 30 off 24 balls. Mayan Yadav, joined him at the crease and contributed 2 off 3 balls, helping reach the target with 4 balls to spare.

American spinner Harmeet Singh Baddhan conceded 32 runs in his 4 overs, while Abinash Bohara gave away 19 runs in his 2 overs. Overseas player Saif Zaib and Scott Kuggeleijn were managed to pick up the wicket of Aasif and Milantha respectively, finishing with figures of 1 wicket for 14 and 43 in 3 overs. Dipendra Singh Airee and Ishan Pandey were the other two wicket-taker, claiming Mohsin's and Neesham wicket respectively and Airee ending with figures of 1 wicket for 40 runs in his 4 overs and Pandey with 1 wicket for 19 runs in his 2 overs.

Janakpur Bolts ended with a decisive victory by 5 wickets securing their first NPL title.

==== Scorecard ====
Source: ESPNcricinfo

1st innings

Sudurpaschim Royals innings
Player	Status	Runs	Balls	4s	6s	Strike rate
Saif Zaib	c Rajbanshi b Mahato	69	43	8	2	160.46
Binod Bhandari	b Rajbanshi	41	31	1	3	132.25
Brandon McMullen	b Neesham	14	12	0	1	116.66
Harmeet Singh	c sub (H Dhami) b Mohammad Mohsin	14	8	0	1	175.00
Dipendra Singh Airee	c sub (H Dhami) b Mohammad Mohsin	9	7	0	0	128.57
Scott Kuggeleijn	b Mahato	13	10	2	0	130.00
Aarif Sheikh	c Rajbanshi b Mohammad Mohsin	1	3	0	0	33.33
Ishan Pandey	run out (Mohammad Mohsin/†Milantha/Mahato)	6	2	1	0	300.00
Naresh Budayair	c Malla b Mahato	8	3	0	1	266.66
Naren Saud	not out	1	1	0	0	100
Abinash Bohara						
Extras 8 (b 1, lb 1, w 6); Total 184/9 (20 overs)				12	8	9.2 RR

Fall of wickets: 117-1 (Saif Zaib, 11.6 ov), 117-2 (Binod Bhandari, 12.2 ov), 143-3 (Harmeet Singh, 14.6 ov), 149-4 (Brandon McMullen, 15.6 ov), 167-5 (Dipendra Singh Airee, 18.1 ov), 169-6 (Aarif Sheikh, 18.5 ov), 173-7 (Scott Kuggeleijn, 19.1 ov), 181-8 (Naresh Budayair, 19.4 ov), 184-9 (Ishan Pandey, 19.6 ov)

Janakpur Bolts bowling
Bowler	Overs	Maidens	Runs	Wickets	Econ	Wides	NBs
Harsh Thaker	3	1	33	0	11.00	0	0
James Neesham	4	0	44	1	11.00	2	0
Lalit Rajbanshi	4	1	15	1	3.75	0	0
Kishore Mahato	3	0	25	3	8.33	0	0
Sher Malla	2	0	25	0	12.50	0	0
Mohammad Mohsin	4	0	40	3	10.00	0	0

2nd innings

Janakpur Bolts innings
Player	Status	Runs	Balls	4s	6s	Strike rate
Lahiru Milantha	c & b Kuggeleijn	87	49	9	4	177.55
Aasif Sheikh	c McMullen b Zaib	33	19	4	2	173.68
Mohammad Mohsin	b Pandey	9	8	0	1	112.50
Harsh Thaker	not out	30	24	0	2	125.00
James Neesham	b Airee	4	7	0	0	57.14
Aakash Tripathi	run out (Airee)	2	6	0	0	33.33
Mayan Yadav	not out	2	3	0	0	66.66
Shubh Kansakar						
Sher Malla						
Kishore Mahato						
Lalit Rajbanshi						
Extras 18 (b2, w 16); Total 185/5 (19.2 overs)				13	9	9.6 RR

Fall of wickets: 73-1 (Aasif Sheikh, 6.6 ov), 105-2 (Mohammad Mohsin, 9.6 ov), 166-3 (Lahiru Milantha, 15.3 ov), 176-4 (James Neesham, 16.6 ov), 182-5 (Aakash Tripathi, 18.4 ov)

Sudurpaschim Royals bowling
Bowler	Overs	Maidens	Runs	Wickets	Econ	Wides	NBs
Harmeet Singh	4	0	32	0	8.00	1	0
Scott Kuggeleijn	3	0	43	1	14.33	4	0
Dipendra Singh Airee	4	0	40	1	10.00	2	0
Abinash Bohara	2	0	19	0	9.50	0	0
Saif Zaib	3	0	14	1	4.66	0	0
Ishan Pandey	2	0	19	1	9.50	1	0
Brandon McMullen	1	0	13	0	13.00	0	0
Naren Saud	0.2	0	3	0	9.00	0	0

== Season statistics and awards ==
Most runs
Runs	Player	Team
293	Lahiru Milantha	Janakpur Bolts
286	Ravi Bopara	Chitwan Rhinos
279	Rohit Paudel	Lumbini Lions
275	Saif Zaib	Sudurpaschim Royals
247	James Neesham	Janakpur Bolts

- Source: ESPNcricinfo

Most wickets
Wickets	Player	Team
17	Scott Kuggeleijn	Sudurpaschim Royals
17	Lalit Rajbanshi	Janakpur Bolts
14	Sohail Tanvir	Chitwan Rhinos
14	Kishore Mahato	Janakpur Bolts
13	Bipin Sharma	Karnali Yaks

- Source: ESPNcricinfo

=== End of season awards ===
Award	Prize	Player	Team
Emerging player of the tournament	रू0.5 lakh (US$330) and 1 million rupees worth scholarship	Bipin Sharma	Karnali Yaks
Maximum Fours	रू2 lakh (US$1,300)	Lahiru Milantha	Janakpur Bolts
Energetic player of the tournament	रू2 lakh (US$1,300)	James Neesham	Janakpur Bolts
Bowler of the tournament	Bike	Lalit Rajbanshi	Janakpur Bolts
Electric player of the tournament (only for Nepalese player)	Car	Dipendra Singh Airee	Sudurpaschim Royals
Team fairplay award	Trophy	—N/a	Lumbini Lions
Player of the tournament	रू5 lakh (US$3,300) and trophy	Saif Zaib	Sudurpaschim Royals

- Source: Desh Sanchar

== Broadcasting ==
Country	Television Rights	Streaming Rights	Ref
Nepal	Star Sports; Kantipur Max	DishHome Go; Action Sports (YouTube)	
India	Star Sports	FanCode	
Bangladesh	Star Sports	None	
Bhutan	Star Sports	None	
Sri Lanka	Star Sports	None	
Maldives	Star Sports	None	
United States	Willow TV	None	
Canada	Willow TV	None	
