= Rudkhaneh =

Rudkhaneh (Persian: رودخانه) may refer to:

- Rudkhaneh, Gilan
- Rudkhaneh, Hormozgan
- Rudkhaneh, Isfahan
- Rudkhaneh, Kerman
- Rudkhaneh-ye Kemal, Kerman province
- Rudkhaneh-ye Soltani, Kerman province
- Rudkhaneh, Jiroft, Kerman province
- Rudkhaneh, Razavi Khorasan
- Rudkhaneh District, in Hormozgan province
- Rudkhaneh Rural District, in Hormozgan province
- Rudkhaneh Bar Rural District, in Hormozgan province
