= 2017 ACC Under-19 Asia Cup =

Cricket tournament

2017 Under-19 Asia Cup
- Dates: 10 – 19 November 2017
- Administrator: Asian Cricket Council
- Cricket format: 50-over
- Tournament format(s): Round-robin, playoffs
- Host: Malaysia
- Champions: Afghanistan (1st Title)
- Runners-up: Pakistan
- Participants: 8
- Matches: 15
- Player of the series: (Afghanistan) Mujeeb Ur Rahman
- Most runs: (Pakistan) Mohammad Taha (250)
- Most wickets: (Afghanistan) Mujeeb Ur Rahman (20)
- Official website: http://www.asiancricket.org

The 2017 Under-19 Asia Cup was the 6th edition of ACC Under-19 Cup. The cricket tournament was held in Malaysia from 10 to 19 November 2017. It was originally scheduled to be held in India, but it was moved after the Pakistan Cricket Board (PCB) refused to travel to India.

== Teams ==
No.	Teams	Qualification method
1	India	ICC full member
2	Pakistan	ICC full member
3	Bangladesh	ICC full member
4	Sri Lanka	ICC full member
5	Afghanistan	ICC full member
6	Malaysia	Host
7	Nepal	Winner of 2017 ACC U19 Asia Cup Eastern Qualifiers
8	United Arab Emirates	Winner of 2017 ACC U19 Asia Cup Western Qualifiers

== Squads ==
Afghanistan	Bangladesh	India	Malaysia
Naveen-ul-Haq (c); Imran Mohammadi; Rehmanullah Gurbaz; Darwish Rasooli; Nisar Wahdat; Ibrahim Zadran; Mujeeb Zadran; Yousuf Zazai; Wafadar Mohammad; Qais Ahmed; Azmatullah Omarzai; Ikram Ali Khil (w/k); Tariq Stanikzai; Waqarullah Ishaq; Abdul Wasi Noori	Saif Hassan (c); Afif Hossain (vc); Mahidul Islam Ankon (w/k); Mohammad Naim; Pinak Ghosh; Shakil Hossain (w/k); Towhid Hridoy; Hasan Mahmud; Nayeem Hasan; Qazi Onik; Robiul Haque; Aminul Islam; Shakhawat Hossain	Himanshu Rana (c); Abhishek Sharma (vc); Atharva Taide; Manjot Kalra; Salman Khan; Anuj Rawat (w/k); Harvik Desai; Riyan Parag; Anukul Roy; Shiva Singh; Tanush Kotian; Darshan Nalkande; Vivekanand Tiwary; Aditya Thakare; Mandeep Singh	Virandeep Singh (c); Muhammad Amir; Syed Aziz; Haiqal Khair; Mohammad Arief; Muhammad Hafiz; Muhammad Irfaq; Shaunvinder Singh; Vishvaruben; Wan Amirul
Nepal	Pakistan	Sri Lanka	United Arab Emirates
Dipendra Singh Airee(c); Sandeep Lamichhane; Aasif Sheikh; Anil Sah; Sandeep Sunar; Rohit Paudel; Kishore Mahato; Pranit Thapa Magar; Shahab Alam; Kamal Singh Airee; Prakash KC; Jitendra Singh Thakuri; Bhim Sharki; Rashid Khan	Hasan Khan (c); Muhammad Mohsin Khan; Umair Yousaf; Zaid Alam; Haider Ali; Rohail Nazir (w/k); Abdullah Shafique; Muhammad Hammad Khan; Muhammad Taha; Saad Khan; Ashar Qureshi; Musa Khan; Shaheen Afridi; Muhammad Ali; Munir Riaz	Kamindu Mendis(c); Jehan Daniel; Krishan Sanjula; Ashen Bandara; Hasitha Boyagoda; Thisaru Rashmika Dilshan; Praveen Jayawickrama; Nipu Ransika; Dhananjaya Lakshan; Nishan Madushanka Perera; Nuwanidu Fernando; Nipun Dhananjaya; Randeer Ranasinghe; Kalana Perera; Kevin Koththigoda	Fahad Nawaz (c); Syed Haider (w/k); Aryan Lakra; Brandon Adam; Hrithik Ansh; Kartik Palaniappan; Niel Lobo; Monish Lakhani; Muhammad Ali; Rahul Neelesh; Shah Faisal Khan; Marlon Malcom Singh

== Group stage ==
=== Pool A ===
==== Points table ====
Team	Pld	W	L	NR	T	NRR	Pts
Bangladesh	3	3	0	0	0	+2.377	6
Nepal	3	2	1	0	0	+0.889	4
India	3	1	2	0	0	+1.257	2
Malaysia	3	0	3	0	0	–4.757	0

==== Matches ====
10 November 2017
Scorecard

India; 310/7 (50 overs)	v	Malaysia; 108 (37.1 overs)

India won by 202 runs
Kinrara Academy Oval

11 November 2017
Scorecard

Nepal; 167/6 (40.1 overs)	v	Bangladesh; 181/8 (39.5 overs)

Bangladesh won by 2 wickets (D/L method)
Kinrara Academy Oval

12 November 2017
Scorecard

Nepal; 185/8 (50 overs)	v	India; 166 (48.1 overs)

Nepal won by 19 runs
Bayuemas Oval

13 November 2017
Scorecard

Bangladesh; 335/6(50 overs)	v	Malaysia; 73 (26 overs)

Bangladesh won by 262 runs
Bayuemas Oval

14 November 2017
Scorecard

Malaysia; 45 (15.3 overs)	v	Nepal; 48/2 (5.2 overs)

Nepal won by 8 wickets
Bayuemas Oval

14 November 2017
Scorecard

India; 187/8 (32 overs)	v	Bangladesh; 191/2 (28.0 overs)

Bangladesh won by 8 wickets (D/L method)
Royal Selangor Club

=== Pool B ===
==== Points table ====
Team	Pld	W	L	NR	T	NRR	Pts
Afghanistan	3	2	1	0	0	+2.853	4
Pakistan	3	2	1	0	0	+1.240	4
Sri Lanka	3	2	1	0	0	+0.988	4
United Arab Emirates	3	0	3	0	0	–4.964	0

==== Matches ====
10 November 2017
Scorecard

Pakistan; 57 (20 overs)	v	Afghanistan; 62/3 (9.1 overs)

Afghanistan won by 7 wickets
Bayuemas Oval

10 November 2017
Scorecard

United Arab Emirates; 66 (22 overs)	v	Sri Lanka; 68/3 (16 overs)

Sri Lanka won by 7 wickets
Royal Selangor Club

11 November 2017
Scorecard

Sri Lanka; 196/8 (42 overs)	v	Afghanistan; 135 (33.5 overs)

Sri Lanka won by 61 Runs
Bayuemas Oval

12 November 2017
Scorecard

Pakistan; 299 (47.1 overs)	v	United Arab Emirates; 73 (26 overs)

Pakistan won by 226 Runs
Royal Selangor Club

13 November 2017
Scorecard

Sri Lanka; 141 (49.4 overs)	v	Pakistan; 142/7 (32.1 overs)

Pakistan won by 3 wickets
Kinrara Academy Oval

14 November 2017
Scorecard

Afghanistan; 224/3 (20 overs)	v	United Arab Emirates; 90/9 (20 overs)

Afghanistan won by 134 runs
Kinrara Academy Oval

== Knockout stage ==
=== Bracket ===
Semifinals
A1	Bangladesh	274/6 (50)
B2	Pakistan	199/5 (39)
B1	Afghanistan	108/3 (20.3)
A2	Nepal	103 (28)

Final
B2	Pakistan	63 (22.1)
B1	Afghanistan	248/7 (50)

=== Semi-finals ===
16 November 2017
Semi-final 1
Scorecard

Bangladesh; 274/6 (50 overs)	v	Pakistan; 199/5 (39 overs)

Pakistan won by 2 run (D/L method)
Kinrara Academy Oval

17 November 2017
Semi-final 2
Scorecard

Nepal; 103 (28 overs)	v	Afghanistan; 108/3 (20.3 overs)

Afghanistan won by 7 wickets
Kinrara Academy Oval

=== Final ===
19 November 2017
Scorecard

Afghanistan; 248/7 (50 overs)	v	Pakistan; 63 (22.1 overs)

Afghanistan won by 185 runs
Kinrara Academy Oval

== Statistics ==
=== Most wickets ===
The top five wicket takers are listed in this table, ranked by wickets taken and then by bowling average.

Player	Team	Overs	Wkts	Ave	Econ	SR	BBI
Mujeeb Zadran	Afghanistan	40.1	20	5.55	2.76	12.05	6/23
Praveen Jayawickrama	Sri Lanka	18.5	11	5.27	3.07	10.27	5/17
Sandeep Lamichhane	Nepal	28.3	9	10.55	3.33	19	5/8
Mohammad Musa	Pakistan	32.0	9	13.22	3.71	21.33	3/11
Munir Riaz	Pakistan	32.0	8	17.37	4.34	24	3/30

=== Most runs ===
The top five runscorers are included in this table, ranked by runs scored and then by batting average.

Player	Team	Runs	Inns	Avg	Highest	100s	50s
Mohammad Taha	Pakistan	250	5	50	94	0	2
Pinak Ghosh	Bangladesh	199	4	66.33	82	0	2
Rahmanullah Gurbaz	Afghanistan	194	5	38.8	71	0	2
Darwish Rasool	Afghanistan	191	5	95.5	105*	1	1
Towhid Hridoy	Bangladesh	179	4	62.67	120	1	0

Source: ACC

== Final standings ==
Pos.	Team
1	Afghanistan
2	Pakistan
3	Bangladesh
4	Nepal
5	India
6	Sri Lanka
7	Malaysia
8	United Arab Emirates
