= Soltani =

Soltani (Persian: سلطانی, romanized: solṭâni, lit. 'of or relating to the sultan') may refer to:

== People ==
- Neda Agha-Soltan, often incorrectly called "Neda Soltani", see Death of Neda Agha-Soltan
- Neda Soltani (born 1977), an Iranian woman who had to flee Iran after media reports confused her with Neda Agha-Soltan
- Hocine Soltani (1972–2002), Algerian boxer
- Karim Soltani (born 1984), Algerian footballer
- Kian Soltani (born 1992), Austrian-Iranian cellist
- Abdolfattah Soltani (born 1953), Iranian human rights lawyer
- Erfan Soltani, a 26-year-old protestor arrested in the 2025–2026 Iranian protests and sentenced to death

== Places ==
- Soltani, Baft, a village in Kerman Province, Iran
- Soltani, Chaharmahal and Bakhtiari, a village in Chaharmahal and Bakhtiari Province, Iran
- Soltani, Sistan and Baluchestan, a village in Sistan and Baluchestan Province, Iran
- Soltani, West Azerbaijan, a village in West Azerbaijan Province, Iran
- Soltani Olya, a village in South Khorasan Province, Iran

== Other ==
- Kabab soltani, a popular Persian dish

== See also ==
- Sultani (disambiguation)
- Sultan (disambiguation)
