= Sultan (disambiguation) =

Sultan is an Islamic title of authority.

Sultan may also refer to:

== People ==
- Sultan (name), including lists of people with the given name and surname
- Rikishi (wrestler), a Samoan-American wrestler who goes by the ring name "The Sultan"

== Places ==
- Sultan, Ontario, Canada, an unincorporated community
- Sultan, Libya, a town
- Sultan, County Tyrone, a townland in County Tyrone, Northern Ireland
- Sultan, Bolu, Turkey, a village
- Sultan, Edirne, Turkey, a town
- Sultan Mountains, Turkey
- Sultan, Washington, United States, a city
- Sultan River, Washington
- Sultan Glacier, Elephant Island, Antarctica

== Animals ==
- Sultan (chimpanzee), a chimpanzee and test subject of Wolfgang Köhler
- Sultan (horse), a racehorse born in 1816
- Sultan chicken, a breed of Turkish chicken

== Fictional characters ==
- The Sultan (Disney), a fictional character in Disney's Aladdin franchise
- Sultan (comics), a fictional character in the Marvel comics
- Sultan, a fictional criminal in the 1999 Indian film Sarfarosh, portrayed by Pradeep Rawat

== Films and television ==
- Sultan (1999 film), a Telugu film
- Sultaan (2000 film), a Hindi film
- Sultan (2008 film), a Malayalam film
- Sultan (2016 film), a Hindi film
- Sulthan (2021 film), a Tamil film

== Military ==
- HMS Sultan, several Royal Navy ships
- FV105 Sultan, a British Army command and control vehicle

== Music ==
- Sultan Records, a short-lived jazz label c. 1946
- Sultans (band), an American rock and roll band (2000–2007)
  - Sultans (EP), the introductory EP by the San Diego, California rock and roll band Sultans
- Les Sultans, French Canadian music band
- Sultan (hip hop artist), mononym for a French hip hop artist
- Sultan (producer), part of the Canadian producing, songwriting and mixing duo Sultan & Ned Shepard

== Sports and games ==
- Boğaziçi Sultans, Turkey's first American football team
- Hyderabad Sultans, an Indian professional field hockey team
- Multan Sultans, a Pakistan Super League team based in Multan, Pakistan
- Sultan (solitaire), a card game

== Transportation ==
- Sultan Air, a Turkish charter airline that operated from 1989 to 1993
- Sultan, a GWR Iron Duke Class steam locomotive run on the Great Western Railway
- Sultan, one of the GWR 3031 Class locomotives that were built for and run on the Great Western Railway between 1891 and 1915

== See also ==
- Soltan (newspaper), a newspaper in colonial India
- Sultana (disambiguation)
- Sultani (disambiguation)
- Sultaniyya (disambiguation)
- Sultanism, a form of authoritarian government
- Soltani (disambiguation)
- Suratrana, Sanskrit transcription of Sultan
- Old Sultan, a German fairy taleale collected by the Brothers Grimm
