= Sajjad Ali (disambiguation) =

Sajjad Ali can refer to:

- Sajjad Ali (born 1966), Pakistani singer and actor
- Sajjad Ali (cricketer, born 1984), Pakistani cricketer
- Sajjad Ali (cricketer, born 1990), Pakistani cricketer
- Sajjad Ali Khan, fictional character portrayed by Akshay Kumar in the 2021 Indian film Atrangi Re
