= Sultaniyya (disambiguation) =

Sultaniyya (from Arabic: سلطانية sulṭāniyya, feminine of سلطاني sulṭānī, lit. 'belonging to the sultan'; Persian: سلطانيه sulṭāniyya / solṭâniye; Turkish: Sultaniye; Urdu: سلطانیہ sulṭāniya) may refer to:

== Places ==
Iran

- Soltaniyeh, capital of the Ilkhanate and a city in modern Iran
  - Soltaniyeh District, Iranian district in Abhar County, Zanjan Province
  - Soltaniyeh Rural District, Iranian rural district in Abhar County, Zanjan Province
- Soltaniyeh, Hamadan, village in Malayer County, Hamadan Province, Iran
- Soltaniyeh Hajjiabad, village in Sonqor County, Kermanshah Province, Iran

India

- Sultaniya, India, a village in Rajasthan, India

Lebanon

- As-Sultaniyah, a village in the Bint Jbeil District, in southern Lebanon

Turkey

- Sultaniye, Karacabey, Turkey
- Sultaniye, Köyceğiz, Turkey
- Sultaniye, Gümüşova, Turkey

== Buildings ==
- Sultaniyya Madrasa, a religious, educational and funerary complex in Aleppo, Syria
- Sultaniyya Mausoleum, a funerary complex in Cairo, Egypt

== See also ==
- Sultani (disambiguation)
