= Perwez Malikzai =

Afghan cricketer (born 2000)

Personal information
- Born: 3 October 2000 (age 26)
- Source: Cricinfo, 17 September 2017

Perwez Malikzai (born 3 October 2000) is an Afghan cricketer. He made his Twenty20 debut for Amo Sharks in the 2017 Shpageeza Cricket League on 17 September 2017. Prior to his Twenty20 debut, he was named in Afghanistan's squad for the 2016 Under-19 Cricket World Cup.

He made his first-class debut for Speen Ghar Region in the 2018 Ahmad Shah Abdali 4-day Tournament on 13 March 2018.
