= Sultaniya, India =

Sultaniya Sultania
- Village
- Interactive map of Sultaniya
- Coordinates: 23°42′N 76°38′E
- Country: India
- State: Madhya Pradesh
- District: Rajgarh

Government
  - Body: gram panchayat

Population
  - Total: almost 5,100

Languages
  - Official: Hindi, Malvi
- Time zone: UTC+5:30 (IST)
- Postal code: 465683
- ISO 3166 code: MP-IN
- Vehicle registration: MP39
- Lok Sabha RAJGARH: Rajgarh
- Vidhan Sabha constituency: Sarangpur

Sultaniya is a village about 40 km from Rajgarh in Pachore Tehsil, in the state of Madhya Pradesh, India. This is a small village with the population numbering around 5100 and largely consists of farmers. Agriculture is mainly dependent upon the monsoon as the village lacks modern irrigation options. In the years of a poor monsoon, the people survive through their livestock, and selling milk.

In Shri Hanuman Temple of this village, Ramayan (Shir Ramcharit Manas) have been continuously reading from last more than 35 years, there are around 400+ families in this village, every day one family turn to keep this tradition and read ramayan for one day (24 hours).

In diwali festival, "CHODA" is famous tradition, villegers play with cow.

== Demographics ==
The village is inhabited by various castes such as the Nagar, Dhakad, Rathore, Brahmins, Bhilala, Muslim and others.
