= Javeed Khan =

Afghan cricketer

Personal information
- Full name: Javeed Khan
- Source: Cricinfo, 21 September 2017

Javeed Khan is an Afghan cricketer. He made his Twenty20 debut for Band-e-Amir Dragons in the 2017 Shpageeza Cricket League on 21 September 2017.
