= Stephen Eskinazi =

South African-born English cricketer (born 1994)

Personal information
- Full name: Stephen Sean Eskinazi
- Born: 28 March 1994 (age 32); Johannesburg, Transvaal, South Africa
- Batting: Right-handed
- Role: Middle-order batter

Domestic team information
- Years: Team
- 2013–2025: Middlesex (squad no. 28)
- 2022/23–2023/24: Perth Scorchers
- 2023–2025: Welsh Fire
- 2023: The Chennai Braves
- 2024: Chattogram Challengers
- 2024: Kathmandu Gurkhas
- 2025: Dhaka Capitals
- 2025: → Leicestershire (on loan) (squad no. 4)
- 2026–present: Leicestershire (squad no. 4)
- First-class debut: 9 September 2015 Middlesex v Yorkshire
- List A debut: 17 May 2018 Middlesex v Essex

Career statistics
Competition	FC	LA	T20
Matches	104	40	140
Runs scored	5,227	1,650	3,785
Batting average	31.48	47.14	30.52
100s/50s	12/22	6/4	1/27
Top score	179	182	102*
Catches/stumpings	95/0	18/–	51/0
- Source: ESPNcricinfo, 26 September 2026

Stephen Sean Eskinazi (born 28 March 1994) is an Australian cricketer who plays for Leicestershire

Born in South Africa and raised in Australia, he is a dual citizen of Australia and the United Kingdom. Eskinazi is a right-handed batsman who is also an occasional wicketkeeper.

== Career ==
Eskinazi was born in Johannesburg, South Africa to an English mother and a Zimbabwean father. He moved with his family to Australia at a young age. Eskinazi attended secondary school at Christ Church Grammar School, Perth, later attending the University of Western Australia. He holds British and Australian citizenship.

After a spell with Western Australia under-17s, Eskinazi joined Middlesex in 2013, initially playing for their second team before being awarded a full-time contract in 2014. On 9 September 2015, he made his first-class debut against Yorkshire in the County Championship.

Eskinazi made his List A debut for Middlesex in the 2018 Royal London One-Day Cup on 17 May 2018. He was awarded his county cap by club president John Emburey during the County Championship match versus Derbyshire at Lord's in September 2018. In July 2020, he was appointed as club captain until the end of the season as a result of the enforced absence of Peter Handscomb due to the COVID-19 pandemic.

On 24 June 2021, in the 2021 T20 Blast, Eskinazi scored his first century in a Twenty20 match, with an unbeaten 102 runs. At the time, this was the highest T20 score at the Lord's Cricket Ground, although it was surpassed by Max Holden in 2023. Eskinazi also became the first batter to score over 130 runs in three consecutive List A games, achieving this in the 2022 One-Day Cup, in which he was the overall top run scorer.

Eskinazi was appointed as Middlesex's T20 captain ahead of the 2022 season, replacing Eoin Morgan. He stepped down from the role in July 2025 for personal reasons.

On 21 August 2025, it was announced that Eskinazi had signed for Leicestershire on a three-year deal which would see him initially join on loan before signing permanently in November.

In franchise cricket, Eskinazi has played for Welsh Fire in The Hundred since 2023. He has also previously played for Perth Scorchers, The Chennai Braves, Chattogram Challengers, Kathmandu Gurkhas and Dhaka Capitals.
