= Sayed Abdullah =

Afghan cricketer (born 1992)

Personal information
- Full name: Sayed Abdullah
- Born: 16 June 1992 (age 34)
- Source: Cricinfo, 16 September 2017

Sayed Abdullah is an Afghan cricketer who plays for Kabul Eagles. He made his Twenty20 debut for Kabul Eagles in the 2017 Shpageeza Cricket League on 16 September 2017. In his second match, he took two wickets for eight runs in three overs, the best bowling figures in the match, which knocked Boost Defenders out of the competition.
