= Nawab Khan =

Afghan cricketer

Personal information
- Full name: Nawab Khan
- Source: Cricinfo, 16 September 2017

Nawab Khan is an Afghan cricketer. He made his Twenty20 debut for Amo Sharks in the 2017 Shpageeza Cricket League on 16 September 2017.
