= Dawlat Khan =

Afghan cricketer

Personal information
- Full name: Dawlat Khan
- Source: Cricinfo, 17 September 2017

Dawlat Khan is an Afghan cricketer. He made his Twenty20 debut for Amo Sharks in the 2017 Shpageeza Cricket League on 17 September 2017. He coaches the Blazers Cricket Academy.
