= Shawkat Zaman =

Afghan cricketer (born 2000)

Personal information
- Born: 1 January 2000 (age 26)
- Batting: Right-handed
- Bowling: Right-arm off break

Domestic team information
- Years: Team
- 2017–present: Band-e-Amir Region
- Source: Cricinfo, 10 August 2017

Shawkat Zaman (born 1 January 2000) is an Afghan cricketer. He made his List A debut for Band-e-Amir Region in the 2017 Ghazi Amanullah Khan Regional One Day Tournament on 10 August 2017. He made his Twenty20 debut for Kabul Eagles in the 2017 Shpageeza Cricket League on 11 September 2017. He made his first-class debut for Speen Ghar Region in the 2017–18 Ahmad Shah Abdali 4-day Tournament on 20 October 2017, scoring 169 runs in the first innings.

In September 2018, he was named in Kabul's squad in the first edition of the Afghanistan Premier League tournament. In November 2019, he was named in Afghanistan's squad for the 2019 ACC Emerging Teams Asia Cup in Bangladesh.
