= Soltani, Chaharmahal and Bakhtiari =

Soltani سلطاني
- Village
- Location within Iran
- Coordinates: 31°31′16″N 50°44′56″E
- Country: Iran
- Province: Chaharmahal and Bakhtiari
- County: Lordegan
- Bakhsh: Central
- Rural District: Milas

Population (2006)
  - Total: 190
- Time zone: UTC+3:30 (IRST)
  - Summer (DST): UTC+4:30 (IRDT)

Soltani (Persian: سلطاني, also Romanized as Solţānī) is a village in Milas Rural District, in the Central District of Lordegan County, Chaharmahal and Bakhtiari Province, Iran. At the 2006 census, its population was 190, in 30 families. The village is populated by Lurs.
