= Samim Sultani =

Afghan cricketer

Personal information
- Full name: Samim Sultani
- Source: Cricinfo, 14 September 2017

Samim Sultani is an Afghan cricketer. He made his Twenty20 debut for Band-e-Amir Dragons in the 2017 Shpageeza Cricket League on 14 September 2017.
