= Rudkhaneh-ye Kemal =

Rudkhaneh-ye Kemal رودخانه كمال
- Village
- Country: Iran
- Province: Kerman
- County: Jiroft
- Bakhsh: Sarduiyeh
- Rural District: Sarduiyeh

Population (2006)
  - Total: 415
- Time zone: UTC+3:30 (IRST)
  - Summer (DST): UTC+4:30 (IRDT)

Rudkhaneh-ye Kemal (Persian: رودخانه كمال, also Romanized as Rūdkhāneh-ye Kemāl) is a village in the Sarduiyeh Rural District, of the Sarduiyeh District, in Jiroft County, Kerman Province, Iran. At the 2006 census, its population was 415, in 61 families.
