= Imran Mohammadi =

Afghan cricketer (born 2001)

Personal information
- Full name: Imran Mohammadi
- Born: 1 November 2001 (age 25)
- Source: Cricinfo, 16 September 2017

Imran Mohammadi (born 1 November 2001) is an Afghan cricketer. He made his Twenty20 debut for Amo Sharks in the 2017 Shpageeza Cricket League on 16 September 2017. He made his first-class debut for Band-e-Amir Region in the 2018 Ahmad Shah Abdali 4-day Tournament on 8 April 2018.
