= Yousuf Zazai =

Afghan cricketer (born 1998)

Personal information
- Born: 25 December 1998 (age 27)
- Batting: Right-handed
- Bowling: Right-arm medium-fast

Domestic team information
- Years: Team
- 2017–present: Band-e-Amir Region
- Source: Cricinfo, 23 July 2021

Yousuf Zazai (born 25 December 1998) is an Afghan cricketer. He made his List A debut for Band-e-Amir Region in the 2017 Ghazi Amanullah Khan Regional One Day Tournament on 10 August 2017. He made his Twenty20 debut for Amo Sharks in the 2017 Shpageeza Cricket League on 14 September 2017.

In December 2017, he was named in Afghanistan's squad for the 2018 Under-19 Cricket World Cup.

He made his first-class debut for Band-e-Amir Region in the 2018 Ahmad Shah Abdali 4-day Tournament on 13 March 2018. In September 2018, he was named in Paktia's squad in the first edition of the Afghanistan Premier League tournament. In November 2019, he was named in Afghanistan's squad for the 2019 ACC Emerging Teams Asia Cup in Bangladesh.

In July 2021, Yousuf was named as one of four reserve players in Afghanistan's One Day International (ODI) squad for their series against Pakistan.
