= Abdul Razak (South African cricketer) =

South African cricketer (born 1987)

Personal information
- Full name: Abdul Hack Razak
- Born: 14 January 1987 (age 39); Durban, Natal, South Africa
- Batting: Right-handed
- Bowling: legbreak

Domestic team information
- Years: Team
- 2005/06–2010/11: Dolphins
- 2010/11–2013/14: KwaZulu-Natal
- 2014/15: KwaZulu-Natal Inland
- 2017/18: Boost Defenders

Career statistics
Competition	FC	LA	T20
Matches	36	23	9
Runs scored	758	227	59
Batting average	19.94	22.70	9.83
100s/50s	0/4	0/1	0/0
Top score	72	66*	19*
Balls bowled	5,090	842	179
Wickets	108	27	9
Bowling average	26.00	25.18	21.00
5 wickets in innings	3	0	0
10 wickets in match	0	0	0
Best bowling	7/49	4/41	3/19
Catches/stumpings	20/–	11/–	3/–
- Source: Cricinfo, 13 September 2017

Abdul Razak is a South African cricketer. He made his First-class debut for Dolphins in the 2005-2006 Supersport Series on 23 March 2006. He made his List A debut for a South Africa Academy side against Zimbabwe A on 28 August 2007. He made his Twenty20 debut for KwaZulu-Natal in the 2011-2012 CSA Provincial T20 Challenge on 2 October 2011.
