= Jaykishan Kolsawala =

Indian cricketer (born 1989)

Personal information
- Full name: Jaykishan Kolsawala
- Born: 10 October 1989 (age 37); Surat, Gujarat, India
- Batting: Left-handed
- Role: Wicket-keeper

Career statistics
Competition	FC	LA	T20
Matches	10	4	2
Runs scored	435	115	7
Batting average	27.18	28.75	7.00
100s/50s	0/2	0/1	0/0
Top score	64	93	7
Catches/stumpings	6/–	0/–	1/–
- Source: ESPNcricinfo, 16 January 2023

Jaykishan Anilbhai Kolsawala (born 10 October 1989) is an Indian cricketer. He has played cricket across all three of the major domestic formats in India for the Baroda cricket team as well as playing cricket in Nepal for Lalitpur Patriots since 2017 in the Everest Premier League. He has also played for Kathmandu Golden Warriors in Nepal's domestic Pokhara Premier League and for CYC Attariya in the Dhangadhi Premier League.
