= Dhakar =

Caste of Madhya Pradesh and Rajasthan

Dhakar/Dhakad
Regions with significant populations
- India

Religion
- Hinduism

Dhakar or Kirar/Kirad/Chouhan is a Hindu Kshatriya Clan and agricultural caste /group in the Indian states of Rajasthan and Madhya Pradesh.

Dhakar or Dhakad was an important merchant community in Rajasthan mentioned in several inscriptions. They are still present in some regions of Rajasthan and Chambal region of Madhya Pradesh but survive as a small community in Vidarbha region.

The word 'dhakad' means one who is not afraid of anyone but faces the things boldly. They live in Kota, Baran, Bundi, Jhalawar, Tonk,Sawaimadhopur, Chittorgarh and Ajmer districts. They speak Hindi, hadoti and use Devnagari.

== See also ==
- Dakar Rally
