= Soltaniyeh Hajjiabad =

Soltaniyeh Hajjiabad سلطانيه حاجي اباد
- Village
- Country: Iran
- Province: Kermanshah
- County: Sonqor
- Bakhsh: Kolyai
- Rural District: Agahan

Population (2006)
  - Total: 24
- Time zone: UTC+3:30 (IRST)
  - Summer (DST): UTC+4:30 (IRDT)

Soltaniyeh Hajjiabad (Persian: سلطانيه حاجي اباد, also Romanized as Solṭānīyeh Ḩājjīābād) is a village in Agahan Rural District, Kolyai District, Sonqor County, Kermanshah Province, Iran. At the 2006 census, its population was 24, in 5 families.
