= Umesh Patwal =

Indian cricket coach

Umesh Patwal is an Indian cricketer and cricket coach. He was head coach of the Pokhara Rhinos in Everest Premier League in Nepal. Now he is currently the head coach of Nepal Premier League team Chitwan Rhinos. He is former coach of Nepalese cricket team and former batting coach of Afghanistan cricket team. He has been working as coach and consultant from couple of years. He was also the assistant coach of Indian Premier League (IPL) team Kochi Tuskers Kerala in year 2011. In 2018 Patwal was technical director of Nepalese Franchise league Pokhara Premier League.
