= Sajjad Ali (cricketer, born 1984) =

Pakistani cricketer (born 1984)

Personal information
- Born: 1 August 1984 (age 42); Mardan, Pakistan
- Batting: Right-handed
- Role: Wicketkeeper
- Source: Cricinfo, 8 November 2015

Sajjad Ali (born 1 August 1984) is a Pakistani first-class cricketer who played for the Abbottabad cricket team.
