= Tahsin Sultani =

Afghan cricketer

Personal information
- Full name: Tahsin Sultani
- Source: Cricinfo, 4 April 2018

Tahsin Sultani is an Afghan cricketer. He made his first-class debut for Band-e-Amir Region in the 2018 Ahmad Shah Abdali 4-day Tournament on 1 April 2018.
