= Rudkhaneh-ye Soltani =

Rudkhaneh-ye Soltani رودخانه سلطاني
- Village
- Location within Iran
- Coordinates: 29°04′49″N 56°32′07″E
- Country: Iran
- Province: Kerman
- County: Baft
- Bakhsh: Central
- Rural District: Dashtab

Population (2006)
  - Total: 122
- Time zone: UTC+3:30 (IRST)
  - Summer (DST): UTC+4:30 (IRDT)

Rudkhaneh-ye Soltani (Persian: رودخانه سلطاني, also Romanized as Rūdkhāneh-ye Solţānī, Roodkhaneh Soltani, and Rūdkhāneh Solţānī; also known as Solţānī and Sultāni) is a village in Dashtab Rural District, in the Central District of Baft County, Kerman Province, Iran. At the 2006 census, its population was 122, in 40 families.
