= List of 2026–27 Afghanistan Premier League personnel signings =

2026–27 Afghanistan Premier League

General information
- Sport: Cricket
- Date: August 2026 – present

Overview
- League: Afghanistan Premier League
- Team: 5

This is a list of personnel signings for the 2026–27 Afghanistan Premier League cricket tournament.

== Background ==
In August 2026, the five represented cities were announced. On 26 August, the APL announced the first three franchise owners, Akcel United Kabul, Balkh Zwanan and Kandahar Warriors. On 23 October 2026, the Afghanistan Cricket Board announced that the captains and coaches draft for the five participating franchises would be held on 24 October in the Dubai.

On 25 October, ACB confirmed the captains, head coaches and mentors of all five participating franchises following the Leaders' Draft held in the United Arab Emirates. Rashid Khan was appointed captain of Kandahar Warriors, with Ravi Bopara as head coach and Irfan Pathan as mentor. Akcel United Kabul appointed Azmatullah Omarzai as captain, Shane McDermott as head coach and Nikhil Chopra as mentor. Rahmanullah Gurbaz was named captain of Nangarhar, with Toby Radford as head coach and Mark Boucher as mentor. Paktia appointed Rahmat Shah as captain, Azhar Mahmood as head coach and Waqar Younis as mentor, while Balkh selected Ibrahim Zadran as captain, Mickey Arthur as head coach and Tillakaratne Dilshan as mentor.

On 3 November 2026, the Players' Draft for the tournament was held at Le Méridien Dubai Hotel & Conference Centre in Dubai, United Arab Emirates. Kandahar Warriors selected Pakistani fast bowler Muhammad Amir as the first pick of the draft. Other notable players selected in the Platinum category included Moeen Ali, Alex Hales, Johnson Charles and Wanindu Hasaranga. The five franchises completed their squads over 18 rounds, selecting a total of 90 players from a draft pool of 462.

== Teams and personnel signings ==
On 25 October 2026, APL confirmed the captains, head coaches and mentors of all five participating franchises. 0n November Nangarhar Cosmic and Team Paktia have exchanged captains.

| Team | Captain | Head coach | Mentor |
|---|---|---|---|
| Akcel United Kabul | Azmatullah Omarzai | Shane McDermott | Nikhil Chopra |
| Team Balkh | Ibrahim Zadran | Mickey Arthur | Tillakaratne Dilshan |
| Kandahar Warriors | Rashid Khan | Ravi Bopara | Irfan Pathan |
| Nangarhar Cosmic | Rahmat Shah | Toby Radford | Mark Boucher |
| Paktia | Rahmanullah Gurbaz | Azhar Mahmood | Waqar Younis |

== Pre-signed ==
Five Afghan Icon Players were selected by the franchises during the draft:

- Akcel United Kabul: Azmatullah Omarzai
- Balkh Zwanan: Ibrahim Zadran
- Kandahar Warriors: Rashid Khan
- Nangarhar Cosmic: Rahmat Shah
- Paktia: Rahmanullah Gurbaz

== Players Draft ==
team rosters
| Categories | Akcel United Kabul | Kandahar Warriors | Nangarhar Cosmic | Team Balkh | Team Paktia |
|---|---|---|---|---|---|
| Icons | Azmatullah Omarzai (C) | Rashid Khan (C) | Rahmat Shah (C) | Ibrahim Zadran (C) | Rahmanullah Gurbaz (C) |
| Platinum | Johnson Charles | Mohammad Amir | Alex Hales | Moeen Ali | Wanindu Hasaranga |
| Diamond | Fazalhaq Farooqi; Dushmantha Chameera | Mohammad Nabi; Joe Clarke | Darwish Rasooli; Shakib Al Hasan | Allah Ghazanfar; Luke Wood | Noor Ahmad; Nahid Rana |
| Gold | Mujeeb Ur Rahman; Imran Mir; Sharafuddin Ashraf; D'Arcy Short; Shamim Hossain | Karim Janat; Hassan Eisakhil; Farid Ahmad Malik; Kusal Perera; Tymal Mills | Kamindu Mendis; Ziawrahman Sharifi; Mohammad Akram Zazai; Ikram Alikhil; Junaid Siddique | Gulbadin Naib; Sediqullah Atal; Muhammad Waseem; Afsar Khan Zazai; Abdullah Ahmadzai | Ijaz Ahmadzai; Farmanullah Safi; Colin Munro; David Wiese; Hashmatullah Shahidi |
| Silver | Imran Tahir; Hazratullah Zazai; Dawood Ahmadzai; Abdul Rahman; Mohammad Saleem | Mohammad Shahzad; Muslim Musa; Dwaine Pretorius; George Munsey; Allah Noor Naseri | Zahir Khan Pakten; Ismatullah Alam; Yamin Ahmadzai; Amir Jangoo; Shafiqullah Ghafari | Thomas Moores; Zia Ur Rehman Akbar; Abdullah Tarakhail; Colin Ackermann; Waqar Salamkheil | Hasibullah Lakanwal; Nangeyalia Khan; Gerhard Erasmus; Olly Stone; Masoodullahman Gurbaz |
| Emerging | Uzairullah Niazal; Khalid Ahmadzai; Keramatullah | Numan Shah Agha; Usman Khan; Naseer Khan Maroofkhil | Faisal Khan Shinozada; Bahar Ali Shinwari; Islam Khan Zazai | Salaam Khan Ahmadzai; Azizullah Miakhil; Abdul Aziz Khan | Abid Mohammadi; Khalid Taniwal; Wahidullah Zadran |
| Supplementary | Said Bahir Shah Mahbob; Curtis Campher | Shawkat Zaman Momand; M. Ibrahim Masood | Aftab Alam; Zubairullah Akbari | Qais Ahmad; Christopher Wood | Sediqullah Pacha; Khalil Ahmad Gurbaz |
