= 2026 Afghanistan Premier League players' draft =

Cricket player selection

General information
- Sport: Cricket
- Date: 3 November 2026
- Location: Dubai, United Arab Emirates

Overview
- League: Afghanistan Premier League
- Team: 5

The players' draft for the 2026–27 Afghanistan Premier League took place on 3 November 2026 at the Le Méridien Dubai Hotel & Conference Centre in Dubai.

== Background ==
The draft was conducted ahead of the inaugural season of the revived Afghanistan Premier League T20, which is scheduled to begin on 27 December 2026.

A total of 90 players were selected from a pool of 462 players across six categories and 18 rounds. Five Afghan Icon players had already been assigned to the five franchises before the draft, with each team completing a 19-member squad.

The five participating franchises were Akcel United Kabul, Kandahar Warriors, Nangarhar Cosmic, Team Balkh and Team Paktia. The draft featured international players alongside established Afghanistan internationals and emerging domestic cricketers.

The tournament is scheduled to begin on 27 December 2026 in the United Arab Emirates.

== Salary cap ==
- Platinum: US$100,000
- Diamond: US$65,000
- Gold: US$40,000
- Silver: US$20,000
- Emerging: US$10,000

== Draft picked order ==
APL Draft 2026 pick order
Category	Pick 1	Pick 2	Pick 3	Pick 4	Pick 5
Platinum	Kandahar Warriors	Team Balkh	Nangarhar Cosmic	Akcel United Kabul	Team Paktia
Diamond 1	Kandahar Warriors	Akcel United Kabul	Team Balkh	Team Paktia	Nangarhar Cosmic
Diamond 2	Nangarhar Cosmic	Team Paktia	Team Balkh	Akcel United Kabul	Kandahar Warriors
Gold 1	Akcel United Kabul	Team Paktia	Kandahar Warriors	Nangarhar Cosmic	Team Balkh
Gold 2	Team Balkh	Nangarhar Cosmic	Kandahar Warriors	Team Paktia	Akcel United Kabul
Gold 3	Nangarhar Cosmic	Kandahar Warriors	Team Balkh	Akcel United Kabul	Team Paktia
Gold 4	Kandahar Warriors	Team Paktia	Akcel United Kabul	Team Balkh	Nangarhar Cosmic
Gold 5	Team Paktia	Team Balkh	Nangarhar Cosmic	Kandahar Warriors	Akcel United Kabul
Silver 1	Nangarhar Cosmic	Akcel United Kabul	Kandahar Warriors	Team Paktia	Team Balkh
Silver 2	Team Balkh	Team Paktia	Kandahar Warriors	Akcel United Kabul	Nangarhar Cosmic
Silver 3	Team Paktia	Kandahar Warriors	Team Balkh	Nangarhar Cosmic	Akcel United Kabul
Silver 4	Kandahar Warriors	Akcel United Kabul	Nangarhar Cosmic	Team Balkh	Team Paktia
Silver 5	Akcel United Kabul	Team Balkh	Team Paktia	Kandahar Warriors	Nangarhar Cosmic
Emerging 1	Nangarhar Cosmic	Team Paktia	Kandahar Warriors	Team Balkh	Akcel United Kabul
Emerging 2	Akcel United Kabul	Team Balkh	Kandahar Warriors	Team Paktia	Nangarhar Cosmic
Emerging 3	Team Balkh	Kandahar Warriors	Akcel United Kabul	Nangarhar Cosmic	Team Paktia
Supplementary 1	Kandahar Warriors	Team Paktia	Nangarhar Cosmic	Akcel United Kabul	Team Balkh
Supplementary 2	Team Paktia	Akcel United Kabul	Team Balkh	Kandahar Warriors	Nangarhar Cosmic

== Drafted players ==
Akcel United Kabul	Balkh Zwanan	Kandahar Warriors	Nangarhar Cosmic	Paktia
Dawood Ahmadzai; Curtis Campher; Dushmantha Chameera; Johnson Charles; Fazalhaq Farooqi; Hazratullah Zazai; Imran Mir; Imran Tahir; Shamim Hossain; Mujeeb Ur Rahman; Abdul Rahman Rahmani; Sharafuddin Ashraf; Mohammad Saleem Safi; D'Arcy Short; Uzairullah Niazai; Khalid Ahmadzai; Keramatullah; Said Bahir Shah Mahbob	Abdul Aziz Khan; Abdullah Ahmadzai; Colin Ackermann; Moeen Ali; Sediqullah Atal; Azizullah Miakhil; Gulbadin Naib; Thomas Moores; Christopher Wood; Luke Wood; Allah Mohammad Ghazanfar; Qais Ahmad; Salaam Khan Ahmadzai; Abdullah Tarakhail; Zia ur Rehman Akbar; Mohammad Waqar Salamkheil; Afsar Khan Zazai; Muhammad Waseem	Mohammad Amir; Farid Ahmad Malik; Joe Clarke; Hassan Eisakhil; Kusal Perera; Karim Janat; Allah Noor Naseri; George Munsey; Dwaine Pretorius; Numan Shah Agha; Mohammad Shahzad; Mohammad Ibrahim Masood; Muslim Musa; Usman Khan; Naseer Khan Maroofkhil; Tymal Mills; Shawkat Zaman Momand; Mohammad Nabi	Zubairullah Akbari; Ismatullah Alam; Aftab Alam; Mohammad Yamin Ahmadzai; Kamindu Mendis; Shafiqullah Ghafari; Rahmat Shah Zurmatai; Amir Jangoo; Faisal Khan Shinozada; Bahar Ali Shinwari; Ziawrahman Sharifi; Alex Hales; Ikram Alikhil; Shakib Al Hasan; Darwish Rasooli; Junaid Siddique; Mohammad Akram Zazai; Zahir Khan Pakten	Abid Mohammadi; Gerhard Erasmus; Wanindu Hasaranga; Colin Munro; Nangeyalia Khan; Noor Ahmad; Nahid Rana; Olly Stone; Hashmatullah Shahidi; Farmanullah Safi; Sediqullah Pacha; Khalid Taniwal; David Wiese; Wahidullah Zadran; Masoodulrahman Gurbaz; Hasibullah Lakanwal; Khalil Ahmad Gurbaz; Ijaz Ahmadzai
