= Electoral results for the district of Kurilpa =

Queensland, Australia, district election results

This is a list of electoral results for the electoral district of Kurilpa in Queensland state elections.

== Members for Kurilpa ==
Member	Party	Term
James Allan	Liberal (Qld.)	1912–1915
William Hartley	Labor	1915–1918
James Fry	National	1918–1922
James Fry	United Party	1922–1925
James Fry	CPNP	1925–1932
Kerry Copley	Labor	1932–1949
Tom Moores	Labor	1949–1957
Tom Moores	QLP	1957–1957
Peter Connolly	Liberal	1957–1960
Clive Hughes	Liberal	1960–1974
Sam Doumany	Liberal	1974–1983
Anne Warner	Labor	1983–1986

== Election results ==
=== Elections in the 1980s ===
1983 Queensland state election: Kurilpa
Party	Candidate	Votes	%	±%
Labor	Anne Warner	7,098	49.4	+3.5
Liberal	Sam Doumany	3,607	25.1	−25.1
National	Patricia Kelly	3,198	22.2	+22.2
Progress	Alvan Hawkes	270	1.9	−2.0
Independent	John Nobody	198	1.4	+1.4
Total formal votes		14,371	97.8	−0.2
Informal votes		318	2.2	+0.2
Turnout		14,689	89.3	+2.3
Two-party-preferred result
Labor	Anne Warner	7,469	52.0	+4.7
Liberal	Sam Doumany	6,902	48.0	−4.7
Labor gain from Liberal		Swing	+4.7	

1980 Queensland state election: Kurilpa
Party	Candidate	Votes	%	±%
Liberal	Sam Doumany	7,158	50.2	+4.8
Labor	Maurice Dwyer	6,549	45.9	+6.3
Progress	Alvan Hawkes	562	3.9	+2.2
Total formal votes		14,269	98.0	−0.3
Informal votes		286	2.0	+0.3
Turnout		14,555	87.0	−2.9
Two-party-preferred result
Liberal	Sam Doumany	7,523	52.7	−0.3
Labor	Maurice Dwyer	6,746	47.3	+0.3
Liberal hold		Swing	−0.3	

=== Elections in the 1970s ===
1977 Queensland state election: Kurilpa
Party	Candidate	Votes	%	±%
Liberal	Sam Doumany	6,547	45.4	+5.1
Labor	John Saunders	5,714	39.6	+2.0
Democrats	Stanley Stanley	1,922	13.3	+13.3
Progress	Fred Drake	240	1.7	+1.7
Total formal votes		14,423	98.3	
Informal votes		255	1.7	
Turnout		14,678	89.9	
Two-party-preferred result
Liberal	Sam Doumany	7,641	53.0	−9.3
Labor	John Saunders	6,782	47.0	+9.3
Liberal hold		Swing	−9.3	

1974 Queensland state election: Kurilpa
Party	Candidate	Votes	%	±%
Liberal	Sam Doumany	4,673	40.3	−5.2
Labor	Frank Gardiner	4,355	37.6	−8.8
National	Col Bennett	1,902	16.4	+16.4
National	Brendan Clark-Coolee	453	3.9	+3.9
Queensland Labor	Damien White	210	1.8	−5.4
Total formal votes		11,593	97.5	−0.3
Informal votes		300	2.5	+0.3
Turnout		11,893	86.5	−5.0
Two-party-preferred result
Liberal	Sam Doumany	7,066	61.0	+9.5
Labor	Frank Gardiner	4,527	39.0	−9.5
Liberal hold		Swing	+9.5	

1972 Queensland state election: Kurilpa
Party	Candidate	Votes	%	±%
Labor	Frank Gardiner	5,233	46.4	+3.3
Liberal	Clive Hughes	5,134	45.5	−3.6
Queensland Labor	Edward Doherty	811	7.2	−0.6
Independent	Michael Neenan	93	0.8	+0.8
Total formal votes		11,271	97.8	
Informal votes		256	2.2	
Turnout		11,527	91.5	
Two-party-preferred result
Liberal	Clive Hughes	5,809	51.5	−4.1
Labor	Frank Gardiner	5,462	48.5	+4.1
Liberal hold		Swing	−4.1	

=== Elections in the 1960s ===
1969 Queensland state election: Kurilpa
Party	Candidate	Votes	%	±%
Liberal	Clive Hughes	4,657	49.1	−4.7
Labor	Ian Brusasco	4,090	43.1	+2.5
Queensland Labor	Edward Doherty	742	7.8	+3.1
Total formal votes		9,489	97.5	+0.7
Informal votes		244	2.5	−0.7
Turnout		9,733	88.8	−5.3
Two-party-preferred result
Liberal	Clive Hughes	5,213	54.9	−3.2
Labor	Ian Brusasco	4,276	45.1	+3.2
Liberal hold		Swing	−3.2	

1966 Queensland state election: Kurilpa
Party	Candidate	Votes	%	±%
Liberal	Clive Hughes	5,203	53.8	−2.4
Labor	Leslie Buckley	3,926	40.6	+4.8
Queensland Labor	Felix Doolan	458	4.7	−1.9
Social Credit	William Smith	89	0.9	−0.4
Total formal votes		9,676	96.8	−0.9
Informal votes		320	3.2	+0.9
Turnout		9,996	94.1	+0.8
Two-party-preferred result
Liberal	Clive Hughes	5,621	58.1	−4.2
Labor	Leslie Buckley	4,055	41.9	+4.2
Liberal hold		Swing	−4.2	

1963 Queensland state election: Kurilpa
Party	Candidate	Votes	%	±%
Liberal	Clive Hughes	5,602	56.2	+6.9
Labor	Bernie Dokter	3,569	35.8	−4.0
Queensland Labor	Maurice Sheehan	656	6.6	−4.3
Social Credit	Paul Kenealy	134	1.3	+1.3
Total formal votes		9,961	97.7	−0.3
Informal votes		233	2.3	+0.3
Turnout		10,194	93.3	+2.4
Two-party-preferred result
Liberal	Clive Hughes	6,203	62.3	
Labor	Bernie Dokter	3,758	37.7	
Liberal hold		Swing	N/A	

1960 Queensland state election: Kurilpa
Party	Candidate	Votes	%	±%
Liberal	Clive Hughes	5,068	49.3	
Labor	Arthur Larkin	4,087	39.8	
Queensland Labor	Paul Tucker	1,115	10.9	
Total formal votes		10,270	98.2	
Informal votes		193	1.8	
Turnout		10,463	90.9	
Liberal hold		Swing		

=== Elections in the 1950s ===
1957 Queensland state election: Kurilpa
Party	Candidate	Votes	%	±%
Liberal	Peter Connolly	3,167	37.5	−5.2
Queensland Labor	Tom Moores	2,737	32.4	+32.4
Labor	Myles Kane	2,421	28.7	−28.6
Independent	George Fry	109	1.3	+1.3
Total formal votes		8,434	98.7	+0.3
Informal votes		113	1.3	−0.3
Turnout		8,547	93.2	+3.2
Liberal gain from Labor		Swing	+11.3	

1956 Queensland state election: Kurilpa
Party	Candidate	Votes	%	±%
Labor	Tom Moores	4,785	57.3	−5.4
Liberal	Doug Berry	3,573	42.7	+12.0
Total formal votes		8,358	98.4	+0.3
Informal votes		133	1.6	−0.3
Turnout		8,491	90.0	−1.7
Labor hold		Swing	−8.7	

1953 Queensland state election: Kurilpa
Party	Candidate	Votes	%	±%
Labor	Tom Moores	5,853	62.7	+5.3
Liberal	Lilian Derrick	2,868	30.7	−11.9
Social Credit	Richard Boorman	349	3.7	+3.7
Communist	Anna Slater	165	1.8	+1.8
Independent	Sydney Clare	101	1.1	+1.1
Total formal votes		9,336	98.1	−0.4
Informal votes		180	1.9	+0.4
Turnout		9,516	91.7	−1.8
Labor hold		Swing	+9.7	

1950 Queensland state election: Kurilpa
Party	Candidate	Votes	%	±%
Labor	Tom Moores	5,999	57.4	
Liberal	John Aboud	4,444	42.6	
Total formal votes		10,443	98.5	
Informal votes		157	1.5	
Turnout		10,600	93.5	
Labor hold		Swing		

=== Elections in the 1940s ===
1949 Kurilpa state by-election
Party	Candidate	Votes	%	±%
Labor	Tom Moores	5,197	53.6	+2.0
Liberal	Norman Brandon	4,274	44.0	−4.4
Communist	James Slater	232	2.4	+2.4
Total formal votes		9,703	98.6	+0.2
Informal votes		135	1.4	−0.2
Turnout		9,838	87.3	−2.7
Labor hold		Swing	N/A	

1947 Queensland state election: Kurilpa
Party	Candidate	Votes	%	±%
Labor	Kerry Copley	5,489	51.6	−1.9
People's Party	Doug Berry	5,144	48.4	+1.9
Total formal votes		10,633	98.4	−0.3
Informal votes		172	1.6	+0.3
Turnout		10,805	90.0	+5.0
Labor hold		Swing	−1.9	

1944 Queensland state election: Kurilpa
Party	Candidate	Votes	%	±%
Labor	Kerry Copley	5,504	53.5	+5.1
People's Party	Norman Brandon	4,780	46.5	0.0
Total formal votes		10,284	98.7	+0.3
Informal votes		135	1.3	−0.3
Turnout		10,419	85.0	−0.5
Labor hold		Swing	+2.5	

1941 Queensland state election: Kurilpa
Party	Candidate	Votes	%	±%
Labor	Kerry Copley	4,556	48.4	+1.6
United Australia	Norman Brandon	4,374	46.5	+21.0
Independent Socialist	Ruby McGrorty	477	5.1	+0.7
Total formal votes		9,407	98.4	−0.2
Informal votes		153	1.6	+0.2
Turnout		9,560	85.5	−5.8
Two-party-preferred result
Labor	Kerry Copley	4,629	50.9	−5.2
United Australia	Norman Brandon	4,469	49.1	+5.2
Labor hold		Swing	−5.2	

=== Elections in the 1930s ===
1938 Queensland state election: Kurilpa
Party	Candidate	Votes	%	±%
Labor	Kerry Copley	4,545	46.8	−17.1
United Australia	John Pringle	2,437	25.5	−5.7
Protestant Labour	Joseph Moore	2,313	24.0	+24.0
Communist	Alec MacDonald	426	4.4	+4.4
Total formal votes		9,721	98.6	+0.3
Informal votes		133	1.4	−0.3
Turnout		9,854	91.3	−0.6
Two-party-preferred result
Labor	Kerry Copley	4,960	56.1	
United Australia	John Pringle	3,880	43.9	
Labor hold		Swing	N/A	

1935 Queensland state election: Kurilpa
Party	Candidate	Votes	%	±%
Labor	Kerry Copley	5,831	63.9	
CPNP	Frederick Cross	2,848	31.2	
Independent	Charles Drew	452	4.9	
Total formal votes		9,131	98.3	
Informal votes		155	1.7	
Turnout		9,286	91.9	
Labor hold		Swing		

- Preferences were not distributed.

1932 Queensland state election: Kurilpa
Party	Candidate	Votes	%	±%
Labor	Kerry Copley	5,177	56.5	
CPNP	James Fry	3,826	41.8	
Independent	Hans Bang	157	1.7	
Total formal votes		9,160	97.2	
Informal votes		263	2.8	
Turnout		9,423	92.4	
Labor gain from CPNP		Swing		

=== Elections in the 1920s ===
1929 Queensland state election: Kurilpa
Party	Candidate	Votes	%	±%
CPNP	James Fry	3,575	53.0	−2.3
Labor	Kerry Copley	3,168	47.0	+2.3
Total formal votes		6,743	99.2	+0.1
Informal votes		56	0.8	−0.1
Turnout		6,799		
CPNP hold		Swing	−2.3	

1926 Queensland state election: Kurilpa
Party	Candidate	Votes	%	±%
CPNP	James Fry	3,536	55.3	0.0
Labor	Hamilton Jones	2,861	44.7	0.0
Total formal votes		6,397	99.1	0.0
Informal votes		59	0.9	0.0
Turnout		6,456	92.1	+3.5
CPNP hold		Swing	0.0	

1923 Queensland state election: Kurilpa
Party	Candidate	Votes	%	±%
United	James Fry	3,310	55.3	−0.7
Labor	William Dobinson	2,675	44.7	+0.7
Total formal votes		5,985	99.1	+0.1
Informal votes		56	0.9	−0.1
Turnout		6,041	88.6	+3.2
United hold		Swing	−0.7	

1920 Queensland state election: Kurilpa
Party	Candidate	Votes	%	±%
National	James Fry	3,342	56.0	+5.3
Labor	John Pringle	2,626	44.0	−5.3
Total formal votes		5,968	99.0	0.0
Informal votes		58	1.0	0.0
Turnout		6,026	85.4	+1.0
National hold		Swing	+5.3	

=== Elections in the 1910s ===
1918 Queensland state election: Kurilpa
Party	Candidate	Votes	%	±%
National	James Fry	2,819	50.7	+4.8
Labor	William Hartley	2,745	49.3	−4.8
Total formal votes		5,564	99.0	−0.4
Informal votes		56	1.0	+0.4
Turnout		5,620	84.4	−6.9
National gain from Labor		Swing	+4.8	

1915 Queensland state election: Kurilpa
Party	Candidate	Votes	%	±%
Labor	William Hartley	2,610	54.1	+9.6
Liberal	James Allan	2,211	45.9	−9.6
Total formal votes		4,821	99.4	0.0
Informal votes		31	0.6	0.0
Turnout		4,852	91.3	+7.7
Labor gain from Liberal		Swing	+9.6	

1912 Queensland state election: Kurilpa
Party	Candidate	Votes	%	±%
Liberal	James Allan	2,204	55.5	
Labor	James Sharpe	1,765	44.5	
Total formal votes		3,969	99.4	
Informal votes		22	0.6	
Turnout		3,991	83.6	
Liberal hold		Swing		
