= List of double centuries scored on first-class cricket debut =

In cricket, a century is a score of 100 or more runs in a single innings by a batsman. Scores of more than 200 runs are still statistically counted as a century, although these scores are referred to as double century (200–299 runs). A double century is regarded as a landmark score for batsmen and a player's number of double centuries are generally recorded in their career statistics. First-class cricket, the longest version of the game after Test cricket, involves two innings per side in a match and scheduled to last for up to three or more days. An individual scoring a double century on his first-class debut is considered a notable achievement by critics.

The first player to score a double century on first-class debut is English batsman Tom Marsden, who scored 227 runs in the second innings. He achieved the feat on 26 July 1826, while playing for Sheffield & Leicester, against Nottingham during the 1826 English cricket season. English batter David Sales made 210 runs in the third innings, while playing for Northamptonshire on 27 July 1996, against Worcestershire during the 1996 County Championship. He did this at the age of 18 years 234 days, becoming the youngest player to score a double hundred on first-class debut, and also in the County Championship. Sakibul Gani of Bihar claimed the highest individual score in an innings on first-class debut till date, scoring 341 runs against Mizoram, on 18 February 2023, during the 2022–23 Ranji Trophy. With this, he also became the first cricketer to hit a triple century on first-class debut. Hanif Kunrai of Kunar Province scored 200 runs off 189 balls, recording the fastest double century in an innings on first-class debut. He set the record on 17 February 2023, while playing against Kandahar Province, during the 2018–19 Mirwais Nika Provincial 3-Day. The highest unbeaten score on first-class debut till date is 267, which has been achieved by Ajay Rohera of Madhya Pradesh in December 2018, against Hyderabad. Indian batsman Gundappa Viswanath made 230 runs on his first-class debut, for Mysore against Andhra in the 1967–68 Ranji Trophy. He also scored 137 runs on his Test debut, against Australia, on 20 November 1969. With this, he became the first and only cricketer to score a double century on first-class debut as well as a century on Test debut.

The feat has been accomplished by 25 players on 25 occasions as of December 2023. No batter has been able to score a double hundred in both innings on first-class debut so far. Mike Powell's score of 200* for Glamorgan against Oxford University, in June 1997, is the first and only instance of a player achieving the landmark on a losing cause. 13 players from India have reached the milestone so far, the most for any country in the history.

== Key ==
Notation	Meaning
*	The player remained not out
Inn.	The innings of the match in which the player scored his century
Date	The date on which the match began
Team	The team the batsman was representing
Opposition	The team the batsman was playing against
Venue	The cricket ground where the match was played
Result	Result for the team for which the double century was scored

== List ==
Cricketers who have scored a double century on first-class debut
No.	Batsman	Score	Inn.	Team	Opposition	Venue	Date	Result	Ref.
1	Tom Marsden	227	2	Sheffield & Leicester	Nottingham	Darnall New Ground, Sheffield	24 July 1826	Won	
2	Norman Callaway	207	2	New South Wales	Queensland	Sydney Cricket Ground, Sydney	19 February 1915	Won	
3	Eric Marx	240	1	Transvaal	Griqualand West	Old Wanderers, Johannesburg	16 December 1920	Won	
4	Arthur Maynard	200*	2	Trinidad and Tobago	MCC	Queen's Park Oval, Port of Spain	15 January 1935	Drawn	
5	Sam Loxton	232*	1	Victoria	Queensland	Melbourne Cricket Ground, Melbourne	19 December 1946	Won	
6	Hubert Doggart	215*	1	Cambridge University	Lancashire	Fenner's, Cambridge	1 May 1948	Drawn	
7	Jeffrey Hallebone	202	1	Victoria	Tasmania	Melbourne Cricket Ground, Melbourne	5 February 1952	Drawn	
8	Gundappa Viswanath	230	1	Mysore	Andhra	Police Parade Ground, Vijayawada	11 November 1967	Drawn	
9	Amol Muzumdar	260	1	Bombay	Haryana	Nahar Singh Stadium, Faridabad	12 February 1994	Won	
10	Anshuman Pandey	209*	1	Madhya Pradesh	Uttar Pradesh	Jayanti Stadium, Bhilai	13 January 1996	Drawn	
11	David Sales	210*	3	Northamptonshire	Worcestershire	Chester Road North Ground, Kidderminster	24 July 1996	Drawn	
12	Mike Powell	200*	1	Glamorgan	Oxford University	University Parks, Oxford	5 June 1997	Lost	
13	Manprit Juneja	201	2	Gujarat	Tamil Nadu	Sardar Patel Stadium, Ahmedabad	13 December 2011	Drawn	
14	Jiwanjot Singh	213	2	Punjab	Hyderabad	Inderjit Singh Bindra Stadium, Mohali	2 November 2012	Won	
15	Abhishek Gupta	202	2	Punjab	Himachal Pradesh	Himachal Pradesh Cricket Association Stadium, Dharamshala	6 October 2017	Drawn	
16	Bahir Shah	256*	1	Speenghar Tigers	Amo Sharks	Ghazi Amanullah International Cricket Stadium, Jalalabad	20 October 2017	Won	
17	Brad Schmulian	203	2	Central Districts	Northern Districts	Bay Oval, Mount Maunganui	23 October 2017	Drawn	
18	Ajay Rohera	267*	2	Madhya Pradesh	Hyderabad	Holkar Stadium, Indore	6 December 2018	Won	
19	Mayank Raghav	228	2	Manipur	Nagaland	Nagaland Cricket Association Stadium, Sovima	6 December 2018	Won	
20	Hanif Kunrai	200*	2	Kunar Province	Kandahar Province	Kunar Cricket Ground, Asadabad	15 February 2019	Drawn	
21	Arslan Khan	233	2	Chandigarh	Arunachal Pradesh	Sector 16 Stadium, Chandigarh	9 December 2019	Won	
22	Sakibul Gani	341	1	Bihar	Mizoram	Jadavpur University Campus Ground, Kolkata	17 February 2022	Drawn	
23	Pavan Shah	219	1	Maharashtra	Assam	Chaudhary Bansi Lal Cricket Stadium, Rohtak	17 February 2022	Won	
24	Suved Parkar	252	1	Mumbai	Uttarakhand	Three Ovals KSCA Stadium, Bangalore	6 June 2022	Won	
25	Jay Gohil	227	2	Saurashtra	Assam	Barsapara Cricket Stadium, Guwahati	13 December 2022	Drawn	
