= 2026–27 Afghanistan Premier League =

Inaugural edition of Afghanistan Premier League

- Dates: 27 December 2026 – January 2027
- Administrator: Afghanistan Cricket Board (ACB)
- Cricket format: Twenty20
- Tournament format(s): Double round-robin and Playoffs
- Host: United Arab Emirates
- Participants: 5
- Matches: 23
- Official website: apl-t20.com

The 2026–27 Afghanistan Premier League (also known as APL 2026) will be the inaugural season of the Afghanistan Premier League, a franchise Twenty20 cricket league established by the Afghanistan Cricket Board (ACB). The tournament will take place from 27 December 2026 to January 2027 in the United Arab Emirates.

== Background ==
On December 2025, Afghanistan Cricket Board (ACB) announced league would return as a five-team franchise Twenty20 competition.

In August 2026, the five represented cities were announced. On 26 August, the APL announced the first three franchise owners, Akcel United Kabul, Balkh Zwanan and Kandahar Warriors.

The Player Draft will be held on 27 September 2026. The Player Registration Window Extended Until October 5, the player draft will be held on 24 October in United Arab Emirates.

On 23 October 2026, the Afghanistan Cricket Board announced that the captains and coaches draft for the five participating franchises would be held on 24 October in the United Arab Emirates. The franchises would select their captains, head coaches from shortlisted candidates, while the ACB would appoint assistant coaches and other coaching staff. The ACB also confirmed that the players draft had been scheduled for 3 November 2026 in the United Arab Emirates.

On 25 October, ACB confirmed the captains, head coaches and mentors of all five participating franchises following the Leaders' Draft held in the United Arab Emirates. Rashid Khan was appointed captain of Kandahar Warriors, with Ravi Bopara as head coach and Irfan Pathan as mentor. Akcel United Kabul appointed Azmatullah Omarzai as captain, Shane McDermott as head coach and Nikhil Chopra as mentor. Rahmanullah Gurbaz was named captain of Nangarhar, with Toby Radford as head coach and Mark Boucher as mentor. Paktia appointed Rahmat Shah as captain, Azhar Mahmood as head coach and Waqar Younis as mentor, while Balkh selected Ibrahim Zadran as captain, Mickey Arthur as head coach and Tillakaratne Dilshan as mentor.

== Teams ==
On 25 October 2026, APL confirmed the captains, head coaches and mentors of all five participating franchises. On November Nangarhar Cosmic and Team Paktia have exchanged captains.

Team	Captain	Head coach	Mentor
Akcel United Kabul	Azmatullah Omarzai	Shane McDermott	Nikhil Chopra
Team Balkh	Ibrahim Zadran	Mickey Arthur	Tillakaratne Dilshan
Kandahar Warriors	Rashid Khan	Ravi Bopara	Irfan Pathan
Nangarhar Cosmic	Rahmat Shah	Toby Radford	Mark Boucher
Paktia	Rahmanullah Gurbaz	Azhar Mahmood	Waqar Younis

== Draft and personnel signings ==
The player draft was held on 3 November 2026 in Dubai, United Arab Emirates. A total of 462 players shortlisted for the draft poool. Each franchise was permitted to assemble a squad of up to 18 players, consisting of 11/12 Afghan players and 6/7 overseas players.

Each franchise was allocated a player budget ranging from US$650,000 to US$750,000. Players were classified into five salary categories: Platinum, Diamond, Gold, Silver and Emerging. On 3 November 2026, the Players' Draft for the tournament was held at Le Méridien Dubai Hotel & Conference Centre in Dubai, United Arab Emirates. Kandahar Warriors selected Pakistani fast bowler Muhammad Amir as the first pick of the draft. Other notable players selected in the Platinum category included Moeen Ali, Alex Hales, Johnson Charles and Wanindu Hasaranga. The five franchises completed their squads over 18 rounds, selecting a total of 90 players from a draft pool of 462.

== Squads ==
The Players' Draft took place on 3 November 2026.

Akcel United Kabul	Balkh Zwanan	Kandahar Warriors	Nangarhar Cosmic	Paktia
Azmatullah Omarzai (c); Dawood Ahmadzai; Curtis Campher; Dushmantha Chameera; Johnson Charles; Fazalhaq Farooqi; Hazratullah Zazai; Imran Mir; Imran Tahir; Shamim Hossain; Mujeeb Ur Rahman; Abdul Rahman Rahmani; Sharafuddin Ashraf; Mohammad Saleem Safi; D'Arcy Short; Uzairullah Niazai; Khalid Ahmadzai; Keramatullah; Said Bahir Shah Mahbob	Ibrahim Zadran (c); Abdul Aziz Khan; Abdullah Ahmadzai; Colin Ackermann; Moeen Ali; Sediqullah Atal; Azizullah Miakhil; Gulbadin Naib; Thomas Moores; Christopher Wood; Luke Wood; Allah Mohammad Ghazanfar; Qais Ahmad; Salaam Khan Ahmadzai; Abdullah Tarakhail; Zia ur Rehman Akbar; Mohammad Waqar Salamkheil; Afsar Khan Zazai; Muhammad Waseem	Rashid Khan (c); Mohammad Amir; Farid Ahmad Malik; Joe Clarke; Hassan Eisakhil; Kusal Perera; Karim Janat; Allah Noor Naseri; George Munsey; Dwaine Pretorius; Numan Shah Agha; Mohammad Shahzad; Mohammad Ibrahim Masood; Muslim Musa; Usman Khan; Naseer Khan Maroofkhil; Tymal Mills; Shawkat Zaman Momand; Mohammad Nabi	Rahmat Shah (c); Zubairullah Akbari; Ismatullah Alam; Aftab Alam; Mohammad Yamin Ahmadzai; Kamindu Mendis; Shafiqullah Ghafari; Rahmat Shah Zurmatai; Amir Jangoo; Faisal Khan Shinozada; Bahar Ali Shinwari; Ziawrahman Sharifi; Alex Hales; Ikram Alikhil; Shakib Al Hasan; Darwish Rasooli; Junaid Siddique; Mohammad Akram Zazai; Zahir Khan Pakten	Rahmanullah Gurbaz (c); Abid Mohammadi; Gerhard Erasmus; Wanindu Hasaranga; Colin Munro; Nangeyalia Khan; Noor Ahmad; Nahid Rana; Olly Stone; Hashmatullah Shahidi; Farmanullah Safi; Sediqullah Pacha; Khalid Taniwal; David Wiese; Wahidullah Zadran; Masoodulrahman Gurbaz; Hasibullah Lakanwal; Khalil Ahmad Gurbaz; Ijaz Ahmadzai

== League stage ==
The full fixture list was released soon.

== Standings ==
=== Points table ===
Pos	Team	Pld	W	L	NR	Pts	NRR
1	Akcel United Kabul	0	0	0	0	0	0.000
2	Balkh Zwanan	0	0	0	0	0	0.000
3	Kandahar Warriors	0	0	0	0	0	0.000
4	Nangarhar Cosmic	0	0	0	0	0	0.000
5	Team Paktia	0	0	0	0	0	0.000

First match(es) will be played: 27 December 2026. Source: Cricinfo
