= 2019 Ghazi Amanullah Khan Regional One Day Tournament =

Cricket tournament

- Dates: 10 – 24 September 2019
- Administrator: Afghanistan Cricket Board
- Cricket format: List A
- Tournament format(s): Round-robin, knockout
- Champions: Mis Ainak Region (1st title)
- Participants: 5
- Matches: 13
- Most runs: Munir Ahmad (414)
- Most wickets: Mirwais Ashraf (16)

The 2019 Ghazi Amanullah Khan Regional One Day Tournament was a List A cricket competition that took place in Afghanistan between 10 and 24 September 2019. It was the third edition of the competition to be played with List A status, following the announcements by the International Cricket Council (ICC) in February and May 2017. Five teams competed; Amo Region, Band-e-Amir Region, Boost Region, Mis Ainak Region and Speen Ghar Region. Boost Region were the defending champions.

Amo Region, Boost Region and Mis Ainak Region progressed to the knockout phase of the tournament. Mis Ainak Region beat Amo Region in the eliminator match to progress to the final against Boost Region. Mis Ainak Region defeated Boost Region by 88 runs in the final.

== Fixtures ==
=== Points table ===
Team	Pld	W	L	T	NRR	Pts
Amo Region	4	3	1	0	+0.546	6
Boost Region	4	3	1	0	+0.049	6
Mis Ainak Region	4	2	2	0	+0.612	4
Speen Ghar Region	4	2	2	0	+0.444	4
Band-e-Amir Region	4	0	4	0	–1.635	0

Team qualified for the finals

=== Group stage ===
10 September 2019
09:00
Scorecard

Band-e-Amir Region; 161 (43.4 overs)	v	Amo Region; 162/6 (37.5 overs)
Darwish Rasooli 55 (56); Mohammad Saleem 3/22 (7 overs)		Mohibullah Oryakhel 34 (38); Nijat Masood 2/18 (10 overs)

Amo Region won by 4 wickets
Ghazi Amanullah International Cricket Stadium, Amanullah
Umpires: Farooq Khan and Izatullah Safi
Player of the match: Ibrahim (Amo Region)

- Band-e-Amir Region won the toss and elected to bat.
- Hayatullah, Abdul Malik, Mohammad Saleem, Ibrahim (Amo Region) and Waqar Salamkheil (Band-e-Amir Region) all made their List A debuts.

11 September 2019
09:00
Scorecard

Mis Ainak Region; 277/7 (50 overs)	v	Speen Ghar Region; 278/3 (47 overs)
Imran Mir 115 (114); Azmatullah Omarzai 3/55 (10 overs)		Nasir Khan 105 (117); Zia-ur-Rehman 1/44 (10 overs)

Speen Ghar Region won by 7 wickets
Ghazi Amanullah International Cricket Stadium, Amanullah
Umpires: Muhammad Sabir and Irshad Omari
Player of the match: Nasir Khan (Speen Ghar Region)

- Speen Ghar Region won the toss and elected to field.
- Sadam Mangal (Mis Ainak Region) made his List A debut.

12 September 2019
09:00
Scorecard

Band-e-Amir Region; 235/9 (50 overs)	v	Boost Region; 239/5 (48.5 overs)
Imran Janat 78 (82); Karim Sadiq 4/31 (9 overs)		Nasir Jamal 98 (107); Nijat Masood 2/49 (8.5 overs)

Boost Region won by 5 wickets
Ghazi Amanullah International Cricket Stadium, Amanullah
Umpires: Ahmed Shah Pakteen and Farooq Khan
Player of the match: Nasir Jamal (Boost Region)

- Boost Region won the toss and elected to field.
- Nasratullah Zadran (Boost Region) made his List A debut.

13 September 2019
09:00
Scorecard

Amo Region; 263/7 (50 overs)	v	Mis Ainak Region; 248 (49.1 overs)
Hayatullah 121* (120); Nawaz Khan 2/33 (10 overs)		Ihsanullah Ihsan 50 (56); Mirwais Ashraf 4/56 (9.1 overs)

Amo Region won by 15 runs
Ghazi Amanullah International Cricket Stadium, Amanullah
Umpires: Izatullah Safi and Abdullah Rahimi
Player of the match: Hayatullah (Amo Region)

- Mis Ainak Region won the toss and elected to field.
- Hayatullah and Noorullah (Amo Regio) both made their List A debuts.

14 September 2019
09:00
Scorecard

Speen Ghar Region; 255/9 (50 overs)	v	Boost Region; 258/5 (45.4 overs)
Shawkat Zaman 58 (68); Sayed Shirzad 3/56 (10 overs)		Munir Ahmad 121 (134); Azmatullah Omarzai 2/31 (9.4 overs)

Boost Region won by 5 wickets
Ghazi Amanullah International Cricket Stadium, Amanullah
Umpires: Farooq Khan and Muhammad Sabir
Player of the match: Samiullah Shinwari (Boost Region)

- Boost Region won the toss and elected to field.

15 September 2019
09:00
Scorecard

Mis Ainak Region; 260/6 (50 overs)	v	Band-e-Amir Region; 138 (40.3 overs)
Noor Ali Zadran 101 (119); Nijat Masood 3/71 (10 overs)		Imran Janat 44 (61); Zia-ur-Rehman 4/25 (9 overs)

Mis Ainak Region won by 122 runs
Ghazi Amanullah International Cricket Stadium, Amanullah
Umpires: Muhammad Sabir and Abdullah Rahimi
Player of the match: Noor Ali Zadran (Mis Ainak Region)

- Band-e-Amir Region won the toss and elected to field.

16 September 2019
09:00
Scorecard

Amo Region; 250/6 (48 overs)	v	Boost Region; 251/8 (47.1 overs)
Javed Ahmadi 85 (77); Abdullah Tarakhail 2/33 (6 overs)		Nasir Jamal 106 (107); Mirwais Ashraf 3/41 (10 overs)

Boost Region won by 2 wickets
Ghazi Amanullah International Cricket Stadium, Amanullah
Umpires: Mahmood Kharoti and Izatullah Safi
Player of the match: Nasir Jamal (Boost Region)

- Boost Region won the toss and elected to field.
- The match was reduced to 48 overs per side due to rain.
- Rifatullah Shinwari (Boost Region) made his List A debut.

17 September 2019
09:00
Scorecard

Speen Ghar Region; 291/9 (50 overs)	v	Band-e-Amir Region; 159 (43.2 overs)
Bahir Shah 104 (100); Mohammadullah Hamkar 3/39 (9 overs)		Zia-ul-Haq 47 (79); Bahir Shah 4/2 (1.2 overs)

Speen Ghar Region won by 132 runs
Ghazi Amanullah International Cricket Stadium, Amanullah
Umpires: Bismillah Jan Shinwari and Mahmood Kharoti
Player of the match: Bahir Shah (Speen Ghar Region)

- Band-e-Amir Region won the toss and elected to field.
- Suliman Safi and Mohammadullah Hamkar (Band-e-Amir Region) both made their List A debuts.

18 September 2019
09:00
Scorecard

Mis Ainak Region; 243/8 (50 overs)	v	Boost Region; 213 (48.2 overs)
Rahmat Shah 65 (73); Dastagir Khan 2/36 (7 overs)		Munir Ahmad 83 (106); Yousuf Zazai 5/29 (9 overs)

Mis Ainak Region won by 30 runs
Ghazi Amanullah International Cricket Stadium, Amanullah
Umpires: Bismillah Jan Shinwari and Izatullah Safi
Player of the match: Yousuf Zazai (Mis Ainak Region)

- Boost Region won the toss and elected to field.
- Abdul Razaq (Boost Region) made his List A debut.

19 September 2019
09:00
Scorecard

Amo Region; 254/9 (50 overs)	v	Speen Ghar Region; 218 (48.3 overs)
Ikram Alikhil 94 (98); Tariq Stanikzai 2/41 (10 overs)		Nasir Khan 84 (91); Mohammad Saleem 5/51 (9 overs)

Amo Region won by 36 runs
Ghazi Amanullah International Cricket Stadium, Amanullah
Umpires: Ahmed Shah Pakteen and Mahmood Kharoti
Player of the match: Mohammad Saleem (Amo Region)

- Speen Ghar Region won the toss and elected to field.
- Abdul Basit (Amo Region) made his List A debut.

== Finals ==
Qualifier
21 September 2019
09:00
Scorecard

Boost Region; 190 (49.3 overs)	v	Amo Region; 134 (35 overs)
Waqarullah Ishaq 43 (51); Mohammad Saleem 4/45 (9.3 overs)		Abdul Basit 35 (71); Mohammad Alam 6/31 (9 overs)

Boost Region won by 56 runs
Ghazi Amanullah International Cricket Stadium, Amanullah
Umpires: Ahmed Shah Pakteen and Izatullah Safi
Player of the match: Mohammad Alam (Boost Region)

- Amo Region won the toss and elected to field.

Eliminator
22 September 2019
09:00
Scorecard

Mis Ainak Region; 205 (49 overs)	v	Amo Region; 169 (40.1 overs)
Ihsanullah Ihsan 52* (69); Mohammad Saleem 3/29 (9 overs)		Ikram Alikhil 58 (88); Shamsurrahman 4/34 (10 overs)

Mis Ainak Region won by 36 runs
Ghazi Amanullah International Cricket Stadium, Amanullah
Umpires: Bismillah Jan Shinwari and Mahmood Kharoti
Player of the match: Zia-ur-Rehman (Mis Ainak Region)

- Amo Region won the toss and elected to field.

Final
24 September 2019
09:00
Scorecard

Mis Ainak Region; 199 (44.5 overs)	v	Boost Region; 111 (23.1 overs)
Imran Mir 47 (56); Samiullah Shinwari 4/24 (7.5 overs)		Ihsanullah 60 (48); Zia-ur-Rehman 3/18 (5.1 overs)

Mis Ainak Region
Kabul International Cricket Stadium, Kabul
Umpires: Mehmood Kharotai and Farooq Khan
Player of the match: Zia-ur-Rehman (Mis Ainak Region)

- Boost Region won the toss and elected to field.
