= 2023 Ghazi Amanullah Khan Regional One Day Tournament =

Cricket tournament

- Dates: 29 October – 20 November 2023
- Administrator: Afghanistan Cricket Board
- Cricket format: List A
- Tournament format(s): Double round-robin and final
- Champions: Boost Region (2nd title)
- Participants: 5
- Matches: 21
- Most runs: Darwish Rasooli (492)
- Most wickets: Yamin Ahmadzai (21)

The 2023 Ghazi Amanullah Khan Regional One Day Tournament was a List A cricket competition that was played in Afghanistan between 29 October and 20 November 2023. It was the sixth edition of the competition played with List A status, following the announcements by the International Cricket Council (ICC) in February and May 2017. It was played as a double round-robin group stage, with the top two teams progressing to a final. All matchers were played at Ghazi Amanullah International Cricket Stadium in Jalalabad.

Mis Ainak Region were the defending champions, but finished bottom of the table in the regular season. Boost Region were the eventual champions, defeating Amo Region in the final by 129 runs.

== Points table ==
Pos	Team	Pld	W	L	NR	Pts	NRR	Qualification
1	Amo Region	8	5	3	0	10	0.615	Advanced to Final
2	Boost Region	8	5	3	0	10	0.355	Advanced to Final
3	Band-e-Amir Region	8	4	4	0	8	−0.308	
4	Speen Ghar Region	8	3	5	0	6	0.069	
5	Mis Ainak Region	8	3	5	0	6	−0.704	

Source: ESPNcricinfo

== Fixtures ==
29 October 2023
8:30
Scorecard

Mis Ainak Region; 102 (25.3 overs)	v	Amo Region; 103/7 (25 overs)
Shahidullah Kamal 38 (63); Abdul Wasi 2/9 (2.3 overs)		Imran Mir 27 (45); Zia-ur-Rehman 3/11 (7 overs)

Amo Region won by 3 wickets
Ghazi Amanullah International Cricket Stadium, Jalalabad
Umpires: Farooq Khan and Mahmood Kharoti
Player of the match: Abdul Wasi (Amo Region)

- Amo Region won the toss and elected to field.
- Juma Gul and Mohammad Gul Alizai (Amo), and Majeed Alam and Samiullah (Mis Ainak) all made their List A debut.

30 October 2023
8:30
Scorecard

Band-e-Amir Region; 37 (21 overs)	v	Speen Ghar Region; 38/5 (11 overs)
Shabir Noori 6 (15); Mohammad Ibrahim 7/22 (10 overs)		Bahir Shah 16 (26); Bilal Sami 3/26 (6 overs)

Speen Ghar Region won by 5 wickets
Ghazi Amanullah International Cricket Stadium, Jalalabad
Umpires: Ajmal Shamolzi and Izatullah Safi
Player of the match: Mohammad Ibrahim (Speen Ghar Region)

- Speen Ghar Region won the toss and elected to field.
- Irfan Safi (Band-e-Amir), and Barakzai Nasari and Dil Agha (Speen Ghar) all made their List A debut.
- Mohammad Ibrahim (Speen Ghar) took his first five-wicket haul in List A cricket.

31 October 2023
8:30
Scorecard

Mis Ainak Region; 183/8 (45 overs)	v	Boost Region; 187/2 (35.3 overs)
Majeed Alam 65* (76); Nangeyalia Kharote 3/17 (9 overs)		Numan Shah 117* (117); Zia-ur-Rehman 1/22 (9 overs)

Boost Region won by 8 wickets
Ghazi Amanullah International Cricket Stadium, Jalalabad
Umpires: Ajmal Shamolzi and Mahmood Kharoti
Player of the match: Numan Shah (Boost Region)

- Boost Region won the toss and elected to field.
- Numan Shah (Boost) scored his maiden century in List A cricket.

1 November 2023
08:30
Scorecard

Speen Ghar Region; 157 (40.1 overs)	v	Amo Region; 159/2 (32.1 overs)
Bahir Shah 36 (55); Juma Gul 4/27 (7 overs)		Abdul Malik 60 (60); Ahmad Zia 1/32 (4 overs)

Amo Region won by 8 wickets
Ghazi Amanullah International Cricket Stadium, Jalalabad
Umpires: Farooq Khan and Izatullah Safi
Player of the match: Juma Gul (Amo Region)

- Amo Region won the toss and elected to field.
- Amanullah (Amo) made his List A debut.

2 November 2023
08:30
Scorecard

Boost Region; 239/6 (45 overs)	v	Band-e-Amir Region; 243/4 (42.2 overs)
Mohammad Ishaq 89 (77); Bilal Sami 3/51 (9 overs)		Naveed Obaid 56 (44); Shamsurrahman 1/33 (7 overs)

Band-e-Amir Region won by 6 wickets
Ghazi Amanullah International Cricket Stadium, Jalalabad
Umpires: Ajmal Shamolzi and Farooq Khan
Player of the match: Bilal Sami (Band-e-Amir Region)

- Band-e-Amir Region won the toss and elected to field.

3 November 2023
08:30
Scorecard

Mis Ainak Region; 196 (41.2 overs)	v	Speen Ghar Region; 198/6 (40.2 overs)
Shahidullah Kamal 56 (73); Mohammad Ibrahim 2/28 (8 overs)		Dil Agha 47 (80); Zahir Khan 3/48 (9 overs)

Speen Ghar Region won by 4 wickets
Ghazi Amanullah International Cricket Stadium, Jalalabad
Umpires: Izatullah Safi and Mahmood Kharoti
Player of the match: Mohammad Tahir Adil (Speen Ghar Region)

- Speen Ghar Region won the toss and elected to field.
- Abdullah Ahmadzai and Jawed Sayedi (Speen Ghar), and Barakatullah Ibrahimzai and Sabir Gurbaz (Mis Ainak) all made their List A debut.

4 November 2023
08:30
Scorecard

Amo Region; 236 (44.2 overs)	v	Boost Region; 237/2 (39.3 overs)
Haji Murad Muradi 97 (103); Yamin Ahmadzai 5/34 (8.2 overs)		Bilal Ahmad 104* (101); Mohammad Saleem 2/48 (9 overs)

Boost Region won by 8 wickets
Ghazi Amanullah International Cricket Stadium, Jalalabad
Umpires: Ajmal Shamolzi and Farooq Khan
Player of the match: Yamin Ahmadzai (Boost Region)

- Boost Region won the toss and elected to field.
- Bilal Ahmad (Boost) scored his maiden century in List A cricket.

5 November 2023
08:30
Scorecard

Mis Ainak Region; 250/9 (45 overs)	v	Band-e-Amir Region; 226 (44.3 overs)
Yousuf Shah 56 (64); Bilal Sami 3/69 (9 overs)		Sediqullah Atal 60 (63); Zahir Khan 4/46 (9 overs)

Mis Ainak Region won by 24 runs
Ghazi Amanullah International Cricket Stadium, Jalalabad
Umpires: Ahmed Shah Durrani and Bismillah Jan Shinwari
Player of the match: Zahir Khan (Mis Ainak Region)

- Band-e-Amir Region won the toss and elected to field.
- Babar Khan (Band-e-Amir) and Yousuf Shah (Mis Ainak) both made their List A debut.

6 November 2023
08:30
Scorecard

Boost Region; 247/6 (45 overs)	v	Speen Ghar Region; 211 (41.3 overs)
Mohammad Ishaq 99* (87); Abdullah Ahmadzai 3/54 (9 overs)		Arshaduddin Safi 76 (89); Nangeyalia Kharote 3/17 (8 overs)

Boost Region won by 36 runs
Ghazi Amanullah International Cricket Stadium, Jalalabad
Umpires: Ahmed Shah Pakteen and Mahmood Kharoti
Player of the match: Nangeyalia Kharote (Boost Region)

- Speen Ghar Region won the toss and elected to field.
- Jawid Sulimankhil (Boost) and Arshaduddin Safi (Speen Ghar) both made their List A debut.

7 November 2023
08:30
Scorecard

Band-e-Amir Region; 229/9 (45 overs)	v	Amo Region; 235/6 (43.4 overs)
Karim Janat 91 (88); Ijaz Ahmad Ahmadzai 2/3 (1 overs)		Ijaz Ahmad 102 (111); Nijat Masood 2/23 (7 overs)

Amo Region won by 4 wickets
Ghazi Amanullah International Cricket Stadium, Jalalabad
Umpires: Ahmed Shah Durrani and Bismillah Jan Shinwari
Player of the match: Ijaz Ahmad (Amo Region)

- Amo Region won the toss and elected to field.
- Kamil Kakar and Jawid Ahmadzai (both Amo) made their List A debut.
- Ijaz Ahmad scored his maiden century in List A cricket.

9 November 2023
08:30
Scorecard

Speen Ghar Region; 189/5 (45 overs)	v	Boost Region; 190/4 (40.2 overs)
Bahir Shah 77* (103); Nangeyalia Kharote 1/20 (9 overs)		Darwish Rasooli 57* (56); Ismat Alam 2/25 (6 overs)

Boost Region won by 6 wickets
Ghazi Amanullah International Cricket Stadium, Jalalabad
Umpires: Ahmed Shah Pakteen and Farooq Khan
Player of the match: Darwish Rasooli (Boost Region)

- Boost Region won the toss and elected to field.

10 November 2023
08:30
Scorecard

Band-e-Amir Region; 138 (31.5 overs)	v	Mis Ainak Region; 139/4 (30.2 overs)
Haroon Khan 52 (64); Dawlat Zadran 4/30 (7 overs)		Rahmanullah 52* (49); Mohammadullah 3/28 (7 overs)

Mis Ainak Region won by 6 wickets
Ghazi Amanullah International Cricket Stadium, Jalalabad
Umpires: Ahmed Shah Durrani and Bismillah Jan Shinwari
Player of the match: Dawlat Zadran (Mis Ainak Region)

- Mis Ainak Region won the toss and elected to field.

11 November 2023
08:30
Scorecard

Speen Ghar Region; 176 (33.5 overs)	v	Amo Region; 177/3 (28.2 overs)
Bahir Shah 50 (55); Kamil Kakar 4/46 (8 overs)		Abdul Malik 108* (89); Ismat Alam 2/28 (5 overs)

Amo Region won by 7 wickets
Ghazi Amanullah International Cricket Stadium, Jalalabad
Umpires: Ahmed Shah Pakteen and Izatullah Safi
Player of the match: Abdul Malik (Amo Region)

- Amo Region won the toss and elected to field.
- Noman Momand and Khair Mohammad (both Amo) made their List A debut.

12 November 2023
08:30
Scorecard

Band-e-Amir Region; 246/7 (45 overs)	v	Boost Region; 187 (42.5 overs)
Nasir Jamal 107* (105); Yamin Ahmadzai 3/41 (9 overs)		Mohammad Ishaq 46 (47); Bilal Sami 4/32 (8.5 overs)

Band-e-Amir Region won by 59 runs
Ghazi Amanullah International Cricket Stadium, Jalalabad
Umpires: Ahmed Shah Pakteen and Bismillah Jan Shinwari
Player of the match: Nasir Jamal (Band-e-Amir Region)

- Boost Region won the toss and elected to field.
- Khalid Ahmadzai and Esmatullah Habibi (both Band-e-Amir) made their List A debut.

13 November 2023
08:30
Scorecard

Amo Region; 254/6 (45 overs)	v	Mis Ainak Region; 255/4 (42.2 overs)
Allah Noor 82 (105); Zahir Khan 3/52 (9 overs)		Rahim Mangal 101 (120); Mohammad Gul Alizai 2/71 (8.2 overs)

Mis Ainak Region won by 6 wickets
Ghazi Amanullah International Cricket Stadium, Jalalabad
Umpires: Ahmed Shah Durrani and Mahmood Kharoti
Player of the match: Rahim Mangal (Mis Ainak Region)

- Mis Ainak Region won the toss and elected to field.

14 November 2023
08:30
Scorecard

Band-e-Amir Region; 236/5 (45 overs)	v	Speen Ghar Region; 229 (44.5 overs)
Islam Zazai 100* (128); Arab Gul 2/29 (9 overs)		Bahir Shah 85 (109); Lalbaz Sinzai 3/38 (8.5 overs)

Band-e-Amir Region won by 7 runs
Ghazi Amanullah International Cricket Stadium, Jalalabad
Umpires: Farooq Khan and Izatullah Safi
Player of the match: Islam Zazai (Band-e-Amir Region)

- Speen Ghar Region won the toss and elected to field.
- Islam Zazai (Band-e-Amir) and Bilal Sayedi (Speen Ghar) both made their List A debut.
- Islam Zazai (Band-e-Amir) scored his maiden List A century.

15 November 2023
08:30
Scorecard

Amo Region; 287/6 (45 overs)	v	Boost Region; 283/8 (45 overs)
Abdul Malik 102 (99); Yamin Ahmadzai 3/46 (9 overs)		Darwish Rasooli 121* (105); Mohammad Saleem 3/48 (9 overs)

Amo Region won by 4 runs
Ghazi Amanullah International Cricket Stadium, Jalalabad
Umpires: Ahmed Shah Durrani and Ahmed Shah Pakteen
Player of the match: Abdul Malik (Amo Region)

- Boost Region won the toss and elected to field.

16 November 2023
08:30
Scorecard

Mis Ainak Region; 223 (44.3 overs)	v	Speen Ghar Region; 224/6 (39.5 overs)
Yousuf Shah 52 (54); Samiullah Shinwari 3/37 (9 overs)		Bilal Sayedi 87 (93); Khalil Gurbaz 3/35 (9 overs)

Speen Ghar Region won by 4 wickets
Ghazi Amanullah International Cricket Stadium, Jalalabad
Umpires: Bismillah Jan Shinwari and Izatullah Safi
Player of the match: Bilal Sayedi (Speen Ghar Region)

- Speen Ghar Region won the toss and elected to field.

17 November 2023
08:30
Scorecard

Amo Region; 151 (35.1 overs)	v	Band-e-Amir Region; 152/6 (30.1 overs)
Ijaz Ahmad 57 (83); Lalbaz Sinzai 3/30 (7 overs)		Islam Zazai 42* (50); Mohammad Gul Alizai 2/36 (7 overs)

Band-e-Amir Region won by 4 wickets
Ghazi Amanullah International Cricket Stadium, Jalalabad
Umpires: Ahmed Shah Pakteen and Bismillah Jan Shinwari
Player of the match: Lalbaz Sinzai (Band-e-Amir Region)

- Amo Region won the toss and elected to bat.
- The match was reduced to 40 overs per side before play began.

18 November 2023
08:30
Scorecard

Boost Region; 206 (44.4 overs)	v	Mis Ainak Region; 143 (27.2 overs)
Darwish Rasooli 65 (76); Mohibullah Zurmati 4/44 (9 overs)		Rahmanullah 33 (48); Sayed Shirzad 4/23 (5 overs)

Boost Region won by 63 runs
Ghazi Amanullah International Cricket Stadium, Jalalabad
Umpires: Ahmed Shah Durrani and Mahmood Kharoti
Player of the match: Sayed Shirzad (Boost Region)

- Mis Ainak Region won the toss and elected to field.

== Final ==
Final
20 November 2023
08:30
Scorecard

Boost Region; 336/6 (45 overs)	v	Amo Region; 207 (39.1 overs)
Darwish Rasooli 122 (91); Mohammad Saleem 2/56 (9 overs)		Ijaz Ahmad 48 (63); Yamin Ahmadzai 3/42 (7.1 overs)

Boost Region won by 129 runs
Ghazi Amanullah International Cricket Stadium, Jalalabad
Umpires: Bismillah Jan Shinwari and Izatullah Safi
Player of the match: Darwish Rasooli (Boost Region)

- Boost Region won the toss and elected to bat.

== See also ==
- Green Afghanistan One Day Cup
- 2023 Green Afghanistan One Day Cup
