= 2018–19 Mirwais Nika Provincial 3-Day =

Cricket tournament

- Dates: 15 February – 15 March 2019
- Administrator(s): Afghan Cricket Board
- Cricket format: First-class cricket (3 days)
- Tournament format(s): Round-robin, final
- Champions: Kabul Province (1st title)
- Participants: 5
- Matches: 11
- Most runs: Nisar Wahdat (653)
- Most wickets: Parvez Amin (24)

The 2018–19 Mirwais Nika Provincial 3-Day was the first edition of the Mirwais Nika Provincial 3-Day tournament, a first-class cricket competition in Afghanistan, that ran from 15 February to 15 March 2019. The five competing provincial sides were representing their regions after having come through regional qualifying events. In the final, the match finished as a draw, with Kabul Province declared as the winner, after taking a first innings lead.

== Points table ==
The following teams competed in the tournament:

Team	Pld	W	L	D	NR	Pts
Kunduz Province	4	0	0	3	1	49
Kabul Province	4	0	0	4	0	46
Khost Province	4	1	0	2	1	44
Kunar Province	4	0	0	3	1	37
Kandahar Province	4	0	1	2	1	24

Advanced to the final

== Fixtures ==
=== Round-robin ===
15–17 February 2019
Scorecard

Kabul Province	v	Khost Province
498/8d (126 overs); Nisar Wahdat 262 (299); Nimatullah 3/122 (27 overs)		268 (72.2 overs); Yousuf Shah 57 (69)
		280/6 (93.4 overs) (f/o); Sadam Mangal 109* (262); Mohammadullah Hamkar 3/41 (15 overs)

Match drawn
Ghazi Amanullah Khan International Cricket Stadium, Ghazi Amanullah Town
Umpires: Farooq Khan and Muhammad Sabir
Player of the match: Nisar Wahdat (Kabul Province)

- Khost Province won the toss and elected to field.
- Mirwais Zazai, Suliman Safi, Awal Khail, Amanullah Rafiqi, Parvez Amin, Irfan Safi, Ashiqullah, Mohammadullah Hamkar, Zahid Khan (Kabul Province), Asghar Atal, Yousuf Shah, Naseerullah, Samiullah Ihsas, Nimatullah, Abdul Qadir, M Hashum and Wahab Shinwari (Khost Province) all made their first-class debuts.

15–17 February 2019
Scorecard

Kandahar Province	v	Kunar Province
120 (42.3 overs); Ainuddin Kakar 32 (73); Mohabat Momand 5/47 (15.3 overs)		443/6d (73 overs); Hanif Kunrai 200* (189); Rahimullah Sahak 3/74 (14 overs)
100/1 (43 overs); Nasibullah Sherdali 42* (116); Tariq Stanikzai 1/9 (10 overs)

Match drawn
Kunar Cricket Ground, Kunar
Umpires: Mahmood Kharoti and Ajmal Shamolzi
Player of the match: Hanif Kunrai (Kunar Province)

- Kandahar Province won the toss and elected to bat.
- No play was possible on day 1 due to rain.
- Abdul Razaq, Nasibullah Sherdali, Rahimullah Sahak, Ainuddin Kakar, Abdul Malik, Hamidullah, Abdul Wahid (Kandahar Province), Javid Rahimi, Hanif Kunrai, Pakhtoon Sarfaraz, Ijaz Ul Haq, Amanullah, Mohabat Momand, Naveed Safi and Bilal Ahmad (Kunar Province) all made their first-class debuts.

20–22 February 2019
Scorecard

Kabul Province	v	Kunduz Province
283/6d (80 overs); Suliman Safi 99 (207); Abdul Haleem 2/60 (15 overs)		297/4 (62.2 overs); Hayatullah 100* (69); Parvez Amin 3/89 (20 overs)

Match drawn
Ghazi Amanullah Khan International Cricket Stadium, Ghazi Amanullah Town
Umpires: Farooq Khan and Irshad Omari
Player of the match: Hayatullah (Kunduz Province)

- Kunduz Province won the toss and elected to field.
- No play was possible on day 1 due to rain.
- Obaid Hotak (Kabul Province), Noman Hosinkhail, Ibrahim, Abdul Hadi, Hayatullah, Abdul Razaq, Abdullah Salarzai, Zafar Balkh and Abdul Haleem (Kunduz Province) all made their first-class debuts.

20–22 February 2019
Scorecard

Khost Province	v	Kunar Province

Match abandoned
Kunar Cricket Ground, Kunar
Umpires: Mehmood Kharotai and Rab Nawaz Ghaznavi

- No toss.
- No play was possible due to rain.

25–27 February 2019
Scorecard

Khost Province	v	Kunduz Province
167 (75.5 overs); Asghar Atal 47 (43); Hayatullah 3/12 (7.5 overs)		247 (67.5 overs); Abdul Hadi 115* (202); Mohammadullah 6/47 (18.5 overs)
308 (97.4 overs); Sadam Mangal 167 (329); Samiullah 5/93 (26 overs)		112/5 (35 overs); Abdul Razaq 52* (118); Bakhtarullah Atal 2/31 (10 overs)

Match drawn
Ghazi Amanullah Khan International Cricket Stadium, Ghazi Amanullah Town
Umpires: Muhammad Sabir and Irshad Omari
Player of the match: Abdul Hadi (Kunduz Province)

- Kunduz Province won the toss and elected to field.
- Shaheen, Niamat Khoshal, Nasim Mangal, Mohammadullah (Khost Province) and Mohammad Saleem (Kunduz Province) all made their first-class debuts.

25–27 February 2019
Scorecard

Kandahar Province	v	Kabul Province
225 (75.4 overs); Waqarullah Ishaq 64 (128); Parvez Amin 6/85 (25.4 overs)		243 (67.3 overs); Nisar Wahdat 66 (86); Waqarullah Ishaq 2/26 (9 overs)
342 (73.1 overs); Rahimullah Sahak 151 (106); Parvez Amin 5/133 (22 overs)		120/5 (31 overs); Amanullah Rafiqi 49 (45); Abdul Malik 3/25 (9 overs)

Match drawn
Kunar Cricket Ground, Kunar
Umpires: Rab Nawaz Ghaznavi and Ajmal Shamolzi
Player of the match: Parvez Amin (Kabul Province)

- Kabul Province won the toss and elected to field.
- Wais Quraishi and Rasool Khan (Kabul Province) both made their first-class debuts.

2–4 March 2019
Scorecard

Kunar Province	v	Kabul Province
220 (44.5 overs); Bahir Shah 66 (57); Parvez Amin 6/58 (16 overs)		393 (82 overs); Nisar Wahdat 168 (161); Tariq Stanikzai 5/66 (21 overs)
97/3 (18 overs); Tamim Surkhorodi 62 (48); Mohammadullah Hamkar 2/36 (8 overs)

Match drawn
Ghazi Amanullah Khan International Cricket Stadium, Ghazi Amanullah Town
Umpires: Farooq Khan and Muhammad Sabir
Player of the match: Parvez Amin (Kabul Province)

- Kabul Province won the toss and elected to field.
- No play was possible on day 1 due to rain.
- Imran Khan (Kabul Province), Toryal Himat, Obaid Wasim and Sadiqullah (Kunar Province) all made their first-class debuts.

2–4 March 2019
Scorecard

Kandahar Province	v	Kunduz Province

Match abandoned
Kunar Cricket Ground, Kunar
Umpires: Mahmood Kharoti and Ajmal Shamolzi

- No toss.
- No play was possible due to rain.

7–9 March 2019
Scorecard

Khost Province	v	Kandahar Province
301 (115.5 overs); Abdul Qadir 168 (292); Dastagir Khan 5/75 (24 overs)		166 (42.5 overs); Abdul Malik 34 (58); M Hashum 5/59 (11.5 overs)
146 (38.3 overs); Nimatullah 52 (38); Rahimullah Sahak 3/14 (4.3 overs)		177 (38.1 overs); Sadiqullah 73 (73); Bakhtarullah Atal 7/36 (14.1 overs)

Khost Province won by 104 runs
Ghazi Amanullah Khan International Cricket Stadium, Ghazi Amanullah Town
Umpires: Farooq Khan and Irshad Omari
Player of the match: Abdul Qadir (Khost Province)

- Kandahar Province won the toss and elected to field.
- Sadiqullah, Nasratullah Zadran, Saifullah, Bilal Ahmad, Qudratullah, Ahmad Zia (Kandahar Province) and Atiqullah (Khost Province) all made their first-class debuts.

7–9 March 2019
Scorecard

Kunduz Province	v	Kunar Province
351 (79 overs); Hayatullah 117 (155); Ijaz Ul Haq 4/66 (19 overs)		248 (78.1 overs); Bahir Shah 91 (152); Noorullah 4/42 (17 overs)
107/2 (25.3 overs); Zafar Balkh 61 (83); Tariq Stanikzai 1/18 (3.3 overs)

Match drawn
Kunar Cricket Ground, Kunar
Umpires: Mahmood Kharoti and Rab Nawaz Ghaznavi
Player of the match: Hayatullah (Kunduz Province)

- Kunar Province won the toss and elected to field.
- No play was possible on day 1 due to rain.
- Zahid Ahmad, Kamran Kunar, Bilal Sami (Kunar Province) and Mohib (Kunduz Province) all made their first-class debuts.

== Final ==
12–15 March 2019
Scorecard

Kabul Province	v	Kunduz Province
531 (136 overs); Mirwais Zazai 159 (154); Samiullah 4/110 (26 overs)		222 (92.1 overs); Zahid Zakhail 76 (208); Mohammadullah Hamkar 7/77 (27.1 overs)
346/4d (96.5 overs); Nisar Wahdat 137 (200); Abdullah Salarzai 1/34 (11.5 overs)		188/3 (32 overs); Zafar Balkh 67* (85); Parvez Amin 1/18 (3 overs)

Match drawn
(Kabul Province won on first innings lead)
Ghazi Amanullah Khan International Cricket Stadium, Ghazi Amanullah Town
Umpires: Mehmood Kharotai and Farooq Khan
Player of the match: Mirwais Zazai (Kabul Province)

- Kunduz Province won the toss and elected to field.
- Asif Khan Omarkhil (Kabul Province) made his first-class debut.

== See also ==
- 2023 Mirwais Nika 3-day Regional
- 2022 Mirwais Nika Regional 3-Day Trophy
- 2018–19 Mirwais Nika Provincial 3-Day
- Mirwais Nika 3-Day Tournament
