= Afghanistan Premier League (disambiguation) =

Afghanistan Premier League may refer to:

- Afghanistan Premier League, a short-lived Twenty20 cricket franchise tournament 2018/2019
  - 2018 Afghanistan Premier League
- Afghanistan Premier League (2026), a Twenty20 franchise cricket tournament first contested in the 2026 season
