= Zahid Ahmed =

Zahid Ahmed can refer to:

- Zahid Ahmed (actor) (born 1984), Pakistani actor
- Zahid Ahmed (Pakistani cricketer) (born 1961), Pakistani cricketer
- Zahid Ahmad (Afghan cricketer) (born 2003), Afghan cricketer
