= Anshuman Pandey =

Indian cricketer

Personal information
- Full name: Anshuman Vachaspati Pandey
- Born: 26 September 1975 (age 51); Chhatarpur, Madhya Pradesh, India
- Batting: Right-handed
- Bowling: Right-arm off spin
- Role: Opening batsman

Domestic team information
- Years: Team
- 1996–1997: Madhya Pradesh

Career statistics
Competition	FC	LA
Matches	6	2
Runs scored	304	58
Batting average	30.40	29.00
100s/50s	1/0	0/0
Top score	209*	46
Catches/stumpings	1/–	0/–
- Source: CricketArchive, 14 August 2015

Anshuman Vachaspati Pandey (born 26 September 1975) is a former Indian cricketer who played for Madhya Pradesh in 1996 and 1997. He is best known for accomplishing the rare feat of scoring a double century on his first-class debut.

Pandey was born in Chhatarpur, Madhya Pradesh, and made his state under-19 debut during the 1991–92 season, aged 16. A right-handed opening batsman, he was selected to make his senior debut for Madhya Pradesh in January 1996, against Uttar Pradesh during the 1995–96 Ranji Trophy season. On debut, Pandey opened the batting with Jai Yadav, and finished with 209 not out from a team total of 536/7 declared, with his innings lasting 545 balls and taking 676 minutes (over 11 hours) to complete. He and his captain, Chandrakant Pandit (who scored 202), put on 328 runs for the third wicket, which as of August 2015 is the highest partnership for Madhya Pradesh against Uttar Pradesh. Pandey became the third Indian (after Gundappa Viswanath and Amol Muzumdar) and tenth player overall to score a double century on his first-class debut, a feat which has since been accomplished by four more players (including two Indians).

Despite his debut performance, Pandey would go on to play only five more first-class matches, two more during the 1995–96 season and then three the following season. In the ten innings after his debut, he recorded only 95 runs at an average of 9.50, with a best of 24 against Railways. Pandey did also play twice in the Ranji one-day competition, scoring 46 against Railways in October 1996, but he played no further matches for Madhya Pradesh after the 1996–97 season, finishing with an overall first-class batting average of 30.40. Of the fourteen players to score a double century on their first-class debut, only Norman Callaway (one match) and Arthur Maynard (two matches) had shorter careers.
