= David Sales =

English cricketer

Personal information
- Full name: David John Grimwood Sales
- Born: 3 December 1977 (age 48); Carshalton, London, England
- Nickname: Jumble, Car Boot
- Height: 6 ft 0 in (1.83 m)
- Batting: Right-handed
- Bowling: Right-arm medium
- Role: Middle-order batter
- Relatives: James Sales (son)

Domestic team information
- Years: Team
- 1994–2014: Northamptonshire (squad no. 5)
- 2001/02: Wellington

Career statistics
Competition	FC	LA	T20
Matches	249	267	61
Runs scored	14,140	7,406	1,279
Batting average	39.27	33.81	28.42
100s/50s	29/64	4/53	0/10
Top score	303*	161	78*
Balls bowled	345	84	12
Wickets	9	0	1
Bowling average	20.44	–	23.00
5 wickets in innings	0	–	0
10 wickets in match	0	–	0
Best bowling	4/25	–	1/10
Catches/stumpings	212/–	114/–	28/–
- Source: CricketArchive, 21 January 2016

David John Grimwood Sales (born 3 December 1977) is an English cricket player who has played for the Northamptonshire, England A and Wellington cricket teams.

== Domestic career ==
Sales was educated at Caterham School, an independent school in Caterham in Surrey. On his debut for Northamptonshire at the age of 16, he became the youngest scorer of a half-century in the Sunday League, scoring 70 not out against Essex. He scored 0 and 210 not out on his first-class debut for Northamptonshire against Worcestershire at Kidderminster in 1996. At 18, he became the youngest player to score a double hundred in the Championship, and in the same year, received the NBC Denis Compton Award. The 210* was not his highest score however; he has passed 200 six other times including a triple century against Essex in 1999 at the age of 21. In 1999, Sales became Northamptonshire's youngest recipient of a county cap.

In late 2001, he joined Wellington cricket club in New Zealand for a year. In 2004, he was made captain of Northamptonshire replacing Mike Hussey. While captain, he continued to score at an average of over 40, but in 2008, he chose to step down from the role prematurely to concentrate on his batting and boost his chances of playing for England. He was replaced by Nicky Boje for the start of the 2008 season. During the 2009 season, he was ruled out in March with injury until 2010. In January 2010, Sales was picked along with new teammate James Middlebrook to represent the Marylebone Cricket Club (MCC) against Durham in Abu Dhabi. This was his first game since his injury in 2009.

Sales retired from cricket at the end of the 2014 season. His final match was a NatWest t20 Blast match against Durham. The match was stopped due to rain with no result; Sales did not bat in his final match.

== International career ==
Sales was tipped for England honours early in his career. He played for the Under 19 side while in his last year of compulsory education and made the step up a year later playing for England A. However, on an 'A' tour to the West Indies, he sustained ligament damage to his knee playing beach volleyball before playing a game and missed the whole of the 2001 English season. Sales has been identified as the best player never to receive England Test cricket recognition.

== Personal life ==
His son James Sales is also a professional cricketer for Northants.

== See also ==
- List of double centuries scored on first-class cricket debut
