= Mansoor Amjad =

Pakistani cricketer (born 1986)

Personal information
- Full name: Mansoor Amjad
- Born: 25 December 1986 (age 39); Sialkot, Punjab, Pakistan
- Batting: Right-handed
- Bowling: Legbreak
- Role: All-rounder

International information
- National side: Pakistan
- Only ODI (cap 170): 29 June 2008 v Sri Lanka
- Only T20I (cap 23): 20 April 2008 v Bangladesh

Domestic team information
- Years: Team
- 2004–2005: Zarai Taraqiati Bank Limited
- 2004–present: Sialkot
- 2005–present: National Bank of Pakistan
- 2006–2007: Leicestershire
- 2010–2013: Sialkot
- 2014–2015: State Bank of Pakistan
- 2015–2018: WAPDA
- 2019–2020: Galle Cricket Club

Career statistics
Competition	ODI	T20I	FC	LA
Matches	1	1	127	155
Runs scored	5	–	5,448	2,783
Batting average	5.00	–	30.60	28.69
100s/50s	0/0	–	7/31	3/8
Top score	5	–	157	119*
Balls bowled	48	6	12,670	6,970
Wickets	1	3	235	175
Bowling average	44.00	1.00	32.79	33.01
5 wickets in innings	0	0	7	3
10 wickets in match	0	0	0	0
Best bowling	1/44	3/3	6/19	5/37
Catches/stumpings	0/–	2/–	50/–	50/–
- Source: CricInfo, 28 November 2013

Mansoor Amjad (Punjabi: منصور امجد, Urdu: منصور امجد), born 14 December 1987, is a Pakistani cricketer who plays for the Pakistan national cricket team and Leicestershire County Cricket Club in England. His father, mother, and other family members supported him throughout his career, encouraging him to play cricket. Amjad first played tape-ball cricket in the street as a child, and was known in his hometown as an all-rounder. He played cricket at an early age for the Saga sports cricket club, and began playing seriously in 1998–99 when he attended a Habib Bank mobile camp in Lahore. Amjad began as a leg spin bowler, and later developed his batting skills as a right-hand batsman. In 2000, Amjad was selected for the under-15 camp. In 2026, he was appointed as fielding coach for the Pakistan senior men's side.

== Early career ==
In 2001, Amjad was selected for the Pakistan Junior cricket academy in Lahore. The following year, he was selected for the first international Pakistan U-15; Pakistan won their first-ever junior U-15 Asia Cup in Abu Dhabi. Amjad was the Man of the Match in his first U-15 match against Oman, taking five wickets for 17 runs. He was selected for the 2003 Pakistan Academy tour of South Africa, taking 11 wickets in four matches. Pakistan won the Videocon Asian Emerging Trophy that year, and Amjad was a member of the squad who defeated Sri Lanka in the final.

He was a member of Pakistan's 2004 Under-19 Cricket World Cup squad, playing eight matches and taking 16 wickets. Amjad was Man of the Match against Ireland, taking four wickets for 27 runs. He set under-19 records for best average and economy rate which stood for almost 13 years.

== International career ==
In 2005, the Australia A cricket team visited Pakistan; Amjad played two matches and took five wickets. He played a Pakistan Cricket Board side match for the Green team after Australia's tour, taking two wickets and scoring 29 runs. Amjad played a side match for Pakistan A against England that year.

Pakistan A won the EurAsia Cricket Series in Abu Dhabi against India the following year, and Amjad took four wickets; one was from Rohit Sharma. Amjad was named the bowler of the tournament, with 12 wickets in five matches. He was part of the Leicestershire Foxes, who won England's T20 Blast that year.

Amjad played county cricket for Leicestershire in the summer of 2007, and was asked to join the Pakistan A team in August of that year to play Australia's A team in Pakistan. He was then chosen to play against South Africa, and was Pakistan's high scorer with 42 runs.

Amjad's Twenty20 International debut was in April 2008 against Bangladesh in Karachi. Asked to bowl the sixteenth over, he took wickets on the second, fifth, and sixth balls for a hat-trick and dismissed Mahmudullah, Mashrafe Murtaza for an overall number of 1-0-3-3. In June 2008, Amjad made his One Day International debut in the Asia Cup; he took one wicket, conceding 44 runs in his allotted eight overs against Sri Lanka.

== Foreign teams and leagues ==
Amjad signed his first overseas contract in 2006 with the Fleetwood Hesketh Cricket Club in Southport, playing three matches and taking nine wickets. He signed with Leicestershire after he was recalled to Pakistan, playing for the Foxes through 2007.

== Coaching career ==
Amjad was appointed by the Pakistan Cricket Board as senior men's fielding coach in July 2026, succeeding Shane McDermott. He had previously served as fielding coach for the Pakistan U19 team and Pakistan Shaheens.
