= Toryal Himat =

Afghan cricketer (born 1997)

Personal information
- Born: 29 October 1997 (age 29)
- Source: Cricinfo, 4 March 2019

Toryal Himat (born 29 October 1997) is an Afghan cricketer. He made his first-class debut for Kunar Province in the 2018–19 Mirwais Nika Provincial 3-Day tournament on 2 March 2019.
