= Rahimullah Sahak =

Afghan cricketer (born 1999)

Personal information
- Born: 23 October 1999 (age 27)
- Source: Cricinfo, 16 February 2019

Rahimullah Sahak (born 23 October 1999) is an Afghan cricketer. He made his first-class debut for Kandahar Province in the 2018–19 Mirwais Nika Provincial 3-Day tournament on 15 February 2019.
