= Pakhtoon Sarfaraz =

Afghan cricketer (born 1998)

Personal information
- Born: 1 January 1998 (age 28)
- Source: Cricinfo, 7 August 2019

Pakhtoon Sarfaraz (born 1 January 1998) is an Afghan cricketer. He made his first-class debut for Kunar Province in the 2018–19 Mirwais Nika Provincial 3-Day tournament on 15 February 2019. He made his List A debut for Nangarhar Province in the semi-finals of the 2019 Afghanistan Provincial Challenge Cup tournament on 7 August 2019. He made his Twenty20 debut on 9 September 2020, for Mis Ainak Knights in the 2020 Shpageeza Cricket League.
