= Ajay Rohera =

Indian cricketer (born 1997)

Personal information
- Born: 4 June 1997 (age 29); Dewas, Madhya Pradesh, India
- Source: ESPNcricinfo, 20 September 2018

Ajay Rohera (born 4 June 1997) is an Indian cricketer. He made his List A debut for Madhya Pradesh in the 2018–19 Vijay Hazare Trophy on 19 September 2018. He made his first-class debut for Madhya Pradesh in the 2018–19 Ranji Trophy on 6 December 2018. He scored 267 not out, and broke the record for highest score on debut in a first-class innings. He broke the record of Amol Muzumdar who scored 260 against Haryana in the 1993–1994 season.

== See also ==
- List of double centuries scored on first-class cricket debut
