= Abdul Basit (cricketer) =

Afghan cricketer (born 2003)

Personal information
- Born: 29 April 2003 (age 23); Baghlan, Afghanistan
- Source: Cricinfo, 2 May 2019

Abdul Basit (born 29 April 2003) is an Afghan cricketer. He made his first-class debut for Amo Region in the 2019 Ahmad Shah Abdali 4-day Tournament on 29 April 2019. He made his List A debut for Amo Region in the 2019 Ghazi Amanullah Khan Regional One Day Tournament on 19 September 2019.
