= 2025 United Arab Emirates T20I Tri-Nation Series =

International cricket tournament

- Date: 29 August–7 September 2025
- Location: United Arab Emirates
- Result: Pakistan won the series
- Player of the series: Mohammad Nawaz (Pak)
Teams
Afghanistan	Pakistan	United Arab Emirates
Captains
Rashid Khan (Note: Ibrahim Zadran captained Afghanistan in the 6th T20I.)	Salman Ali Agha	Muhammad Waseem
Most runs
Ibrahim Zadran (194)	Fakhar Zaman (155)	Muhammad Waseem (163)
Most wickets
Rashid Khan (9)	Mohammad Nawaz (10)	Haider Ali (6)

The 2025 United Arab Emirates T20I Tri-Nation Series was a ⁣⁣cricket⁣⁣ tournament which was held from 29 August to 7 September 2025 in the United Arab Emirates. The participating teams were the hosts United Arab Emirates, along with the men's national teams of Afghanistan and Pakistan, with the matches played in Twenty20 International (T20I) format. The tournament was played in a double round-robin format, with the top two teams advancing for the final. The tri-series formed part of the preparation of all participating teams for the 2025 Asia Cup. All the matches were played at the Sharjah Cricket Stadium.

== Squads ==
Afghanistan	Pakistan	United Arab Emirates
Rashid Khan (c); Fareed Ahmad; Noor Ahmad; Abdullah Ahmadzai; Sediqullah Atal; Sharafuddin Ashraf; Fazalhaq Farooqi; Allah Mohammad Ghazanfar; Rahmanullah Gurbaz (wk); Mohammad Ishaq (wk); Karim Janat; Mujeeb Ur Rahman; Gulbadin Naib; Mohammad Nabi; Azmatullah Omarzai; Darwish Rasooli; Ibrahim Zadran	Salman Ali Agha (c); Shaheen Afridi; Abrar Ahmed; Hasan Ali; Faheem Ashraf; Saim Ayub; Sahibzada Farhan; Mohammad Haris (wk); Salman Mirza; Sufiyan Muqeem; Hassan Nawaz; Mohammad Nawaz; Haris Rauf; Khushdil Shah; Hussain Talat; Mohammad Wasim; Fakhar Zaman	Muhammad Waseem (c); Haider Ali; Rahul Chopra (wk); Ethan D'Souza; Muhammad Farooq; Muhammad Jawadullah; Harshit Kaushik; Dhruv Parashar; Asif Khan; Saghir Khan; Muhammad Rohid; Alishan Sharafu; Aryansh Sharma (wk); Junaid Siddique; Simranjeet Singh; Muhammad Zohaib

== Round-robin ==
=== Points table ===
Pos	Team	Pld	W	L	NR	Pts	NRR	Qualification
1	Pakistan	4	3	1	0	6	1.037	Advanced to the final
2	Afghanistan	4	3	1	0	6	0.262	Advanced to the final
3	United Arab Emirates (H)	4	0	4	0	0	−1.300	

Source: ESPNcricinfo
(H) Host

=== Fixtures ===
29 August 2025
19:00 (N)
Scorecard

Pakistan; 182/7 (20 overs)	v	Afghanistan; 143 (19.5 overs)
Salman Ali Agha 53* (36); Fareed Ahmad 2/47 (4 overs)		Rashid Khan 39 (16); Haris Rauf 4/31 (3.5 overs)

Pakistan won by 39 runs
Sharjah Cricket Stadium, Sharjah
Umpires: Akbar Ali (UAE) and Shiju Sam (UAE)
Player of the match: Salman Ali Agha (Pak)

- Pakistan won the toss and elected to bat.

30 August 2025
19:00 (N)
Scorecard

Pakistan; 207 (20 overs)	v	United Arab Emirates; 176/8 (20 overs)
Saim Ayub 69 (38); Saghir Khan 3/44 (4 overs)		Asif Khan 77 (35); Hasan Ali 3/47 (4 overs)

Pakistan won by 31 runs
Sharjah Cricket Stadium, Sharjah
Umpires: Aasif Iqbal (UAE) and Shiju Sam (UAE)
Player of the match: Saim Ayub (Pak)

- Pakistan won the toss and elected to bat.

1 September 2025
19:00 (N)
Scorecard

Afghanistan; 188/4 (20 overs)	v	United Arab Emirates; 150/8 (20 overs)
Ibrahim Zadran 63 (40); Muhammad Rohid 2/34 (4 overs)		Muhammad Waseem 67 (37); Rashid Khan 3/21 (4 overs)

Afghanistan won by 38 runs
Sharjah Cricket Stadium, Sharjah
Umpires: Akbar Ali (UAE) and Aasif Iqbal (UAE)
Player of the match: Sharafuddin Ashraf (Afg)

- United Arab Emirates won the toss and elected to field.
- Harshit Kaushik (UAE) made his T20I debut.
- Rashid Khan (Afg) took his 165th wicket in T20Is, becoming the highest wicket-taker in men's T20Is, going past Tim Southee (164).

2 September 2025
19:00 (N)
Scorecard

Afghanistan; 169/5 (20 overs)	v	Pakistan; 151/9 (20 overs)
Ibrahim Zadran 65 (45); Faheem Ashraf 4/27 (4 overs)		Haris Rauf 34* (16); Noor Ahmad 2/20 (4 overs); Mohammad Nabi 2/20 (4 overs)

Afghanistan won by 18 runs
Sharjah Cricket Stadium, Sharjah
Umpires: Akbar Ali (UAE) and Aasif Iqbal (UAE)
Player of the match: Ibrahim Zadran (Afg)

- Afghanistan won the toss and elected to bat.
- Allah Mohammad Ghazanfar (Afg) made his T20I debut.
- Fakhar Zaman (Pak) played in his 100th T20I match, and scored his 2,000th run in T20Is.
- Mohammad Nabi (Afg) took his 100th wicket in T20Is.

4 September 2025
19:00 (N)
Scorecard

Pakistan; 171/5 (20 overs)	v	United Arab Emirates; 140/7 (20 overs)
Fakhar Zaman 77* (44); Haider Ali 2/17 (4 overs)		Alishan Sharafu 68 (51); Abrar Ahmed 4/9 (4 overs)

Pakistan won by 31 runs
Sharjah Cricket Stadium, Sharjah
Umpires: Akbar Ali (UAE) and Shiju Sam (UAE)
Player of the match: Abrar Ahmed (Pak)

- Pakistan won the toss and elected to bat.
- Junaid Siddique became the first player to take 100 wickets for UAE in men's T20Is.

5 September 2025
19:00 (N)
Scorecard

Afghanistan; 170/4 (20 overs)	v	United Arab Emirates; 166/5 (20 overs)
Ibrahim Zadran 48 (35); Haider Ali 2/23 (4 overs)		Muhammad Waseem 44 (29); Sharafuddin Ashraf 1/20 (4 overs)

Afghanistan won by 4 runs
Sharjah Cricket Stadium, Sharjah
Umpires: Aasif Iqbal (UAE) and Shiju Sam (UAE)
Player of the match: Ibrahim Zadran (Afg)

- Afghanistan won the toss and elected to bat.
- Abdullah Ahmadzai (Afg) made his T20I debut.

== Final ==
7 September 2025
19:00 (N)
Scorecard

Pakistan; 141/8 (20 overs)	v	Afghanistan; 66 (15.5 overs)
Fakhar Zaman 27 (26); Rashid Khan 3/38 (4 overs)		Rashid Khan 17 (18); Mohammad Nawaz 5/19 (4 overs)

Pakistan won by 75 runs
Sharjah Cricket Stadium, Sharjah
Umpires: Aasif Iqbal (UAE) and Shiju Sam (UAE)
Player of the match: Mohammad Nawaz (Pak)

- Pakistan won the toss and elected to bat.
- Rashid Khan (Afg) played in his 100th T20I match.
- Mohammad Nawaz (Pak) took his first hat-trick and five wicket haul in T20Is.
