= Parvez Amin =

Afghan cricketer (born 2000)

Personal information
- Born: 5 September 2000 (age 26); Nangarhar, Afghanistan
- Source: Cricinfo, 16 February 2019

Parvez Amin (born 5 September 2000) is an Afghan cricketer. He made his first-class debut for Kabul Province in the 2018–19 Mirwais Nika Provincial 3-Day tournament on 15 February 2019. He was the leading wicket-taker in the tournament, with 24 dismissals in five matches. He made his Twenty20 debut for Amo Sharks in the 2019 Shpageeza Cricket League on 11 October 2019.
