= Nasratullah Zadran =

Afghan cricketer (born 2002)

Personal information
- Born: 1 January 2002 (age 24)
- Source: Cricinfo, 9 March 2019

Nasratullah Zadran (born 1 January 2002) is an Afghan cricketer. He made his first-class debut for Kandahar Province in the 2018–19 Mirwais Nika Provincial 3-Day tournament on 7 March 2019. He made his List A debut for Boost Region in the 2019 Ghazi Amanullah Khan Regional One Day Tournament on 12 September 2019.
