= Javid Rahimi =

Afghan cricketer

Personal information
- Full name: Javid Rahimi
- Born: Nangahar, Afghanistan

Domestic team information
- Years: Team
- 2017–present: Mis Ainak Region
- Source: Cricinfo, 10 August 2017

Javid Rahimi is an Afghan cricketer. He made his List A debut for Mis Ainak Region in the 2017 Ghazi Amanullah Khan Regional One Day Tournament on 10 August 2017. He made his first-class debut for Kunar Province in the 2018–19 Mirwais Nika Provincial 3-Day tournament on 15 February 2019.
