= Mohabat Momand =

Afghan cricketer (born 1995)

Personal information
- Born: 22 September 1995 (age 31)
- Source: Cricinfo, 16 February 2019

Mohabat Momand (born 22 September 1995) is an Afghan cricketer. He made his first-class debut for Kunar Province in the 2018–19 Mirwais Nika Provincial 3-Day tournament on 15 February 2019.
