= Samiullah Ihsas =

Afghan cricketer (born 1997)

Personal information
- Born: 2 March 1997 (age 29)
- Source: Cricinfo, 16 February 2019

Samiullah Ihsas (born 2 March 1997) is an Afghan cricketer. He made his first-class debut for Khost Province in the 2018–19 Mirwais Nika Provincial 3-Day tournament on 15 February 2019. He made his List A debut for Logar Province in the 2019 Afghanistan Provincial Challenge Cup tournament on 1 August 2019.
