= Sakibul Gani =

Indian cricketer (born 1999)

Personal information
- Born: 2 September 1999 (age 27); Motihari, Bihar, India
- Batting: Right-handed
- Bowling: Right arm medium-fast

Domestic team information
- Years: Team
- 2019/20–present: Bihar

Career statistics
Competition	FC	LA	T20
Matches	23	33	31
Runs scored	1,814	867	852
Batting average	47.73	29.89	34.08
100s/50s	5/5	2/2	1/4
Top score	341	114	120*
Balls bowled	1,351	565	96
Wickets	15	11	1
Bowling average	50.33	45.54	118.00
5 wickets in innings	0	0	0
10 wickets in match	0	–	–
Best bowling	4/91	3/29	1/21
Catches/stumpings	19/–	15/–	12/–
- Source: Cricinfo, 11 April 2025

Sakibul Gani (born 2 September 1999) is an Indian cricketer. In February 2022, he became the first cricketer to score a triple century on debut in a first-class match.

He made his List A debut on 7 October 2019, for Bihar in the 2019–20 Vijay Hazare Trophy. He made his Twenty20 debut on 11 January 2021, for Bihar in the 2020–21 Syed Mushtaq Ali Trophy. He made his first-class debut on 17 February 2022, for Bihar in the 2021–22 Ranji Trophy. He went on to score 341 runs, becoming the first player to score a triple century on their first-class debut. Gani scored 98 and 101 not out in his next two innings, giving him the highest aggregate in a batter's first three innings in first-class cricket with 540 runs. On 24 December 2025 he scored the 3rd fastest list A century in the world and fastest by an Indian player in this format.

== See also ==
- List of double centuries scored on first-class cricket debut
