= Wahab Shinwari =

Afghan cricketer (born 1998)

Personal information
- Born: 11 February 1998 (age 28)
- Source: Cricinfo, 16 February 2019

Wahab Shinwari (born 11 February 1998) is an Afghan cricketer. He made his first-class debut for Khost Province in the 2018–19 Mirwais Nika Provincial 3-Day tournament on 15 February 2019.
