= Nisar Wahdat =

Afghan cricketer (born 1999)

Personal information
- Born: 22 June 1999 (age 27)
- Source: Cricinfo, 4 March 2018

Nisar Wahdat (born 22 June 1999) is an Afghan cricketer. He made his first-class debut for Amo Region in the 2018 Ahmad Shah Abdali 4-day Tournament on 1 March 2018. Prior to his first-class debut, he was part of Afghanistan's squad for the 2018 Under-19 Cricket World Cup.

He made his List A debut for Amo Region in the 2018 Ghazi Amanullah Khan Regional One Day Tournament on 10 July 2018. He was the leading run-scorer in the 2018–19 Mirwais Nika Provincial 3-Day tournament, with 653 runs in five matches. He made his Twenty20 debut for Boost Defenders in the 2019 Shpageeza Cricket League on 11 October 2019.
