= James Sales =

English cricketer (born 2003)

Personal information
- Full name: James John Grimwood Sales
- Born: 11 February 2003 (age 23); Northampton, Northamptonshire, England
- Batting: Right-handed
- Bowling: Right-arm medium
- Relatives: David Sales (father)

Domestic team information
- Years: Team
- 2021–present: Northamptonshire (squad no. 5)
- FC debut: 5 September 2021 Northamptonshire v Surrey
- LA debut: 8 August 2021 Northamptonshire v Somerset

Career statistics
Competition	FC	LA	T20
Matches	47	26	24
Runs scored	2,193	526	76
Batting average	32.73	35.06	10.84
100s/50s	5/9	1/1	0/0
Top score	164	117	12
Balls bowled	1,605	448	399
Wickets	27	7	26
Bowling average	45.18	66.28	22.46
5 wickets in innings	0	0	1
10 wickets in match	0	0	0
Best bowling	4/24	2/31	5/21
Catches/stumpings	19/–	5/–	6/–
- Source: Cricinfo, 27 September 2026

James John Grimwood Sales (born 11 February 2003) is an English cricketer. He made his List A debut on 8 August 2021, for Northamptonshire in the 2021 Royal London One-Day Cup. He made his first-class debut on 5 September 2021, for Northamptonshire in the 2021 County Championship. His father David Sales was also a professional cricketer for Northamptonshire.

In December 2021, he was named in England's team for the 2022 ICC Under-19 Cricket World Cup in the West Indies. He made his Twenty20 debut on 26 May 2022, for the Northants Steelbacks in the 2022 T20 Blast.
