= Mohammadullah Hamkar =

Afghan cricketer (born 2001)

Personal information
- Born: 25 September 2001 (age 25)
- Source: Cricinfo, 16 February 2019

Mohammadullah Hamkar (born 25 September 2001) is an Afghan cricketer. He made his first-class debut for Kabul Province in the 2018–19 Mirwais Nika Provincial 3-Day tournament on 15 February 2019. He made his List A debut for Band-e-Amir Region in the 2019 Ghazi Amanullah Khan Regional One Day Tournament on 17 September 2019. He made his Twenty20 debut on 9 September 2020, for Mis Ainak Knights in the 2020 Shpageeza Cricket League.
