= Hanif Kunrai =

Afghan cricketer (born 1994)

Personal information
- Born: 16 June 1994 (age 32)
- Source: Cricinfo, 16 February 2019

Hanif Kunrai (born 16 June 1994) is an Afghan cricketer. He made his first-class debut for Kunar Province in the 2018–19 Mirwais Nika Provincial 3-Day tournament on 15 February 2019, scoring 200 not out in the first innings.

== See also ==
- List of double centuries scored on first-class cricket debut
