= Peter Connolly (judge) =

Australian politician and judge

Peter Connolly QC, CBE

Member of the Queensland Legislative Assembly for Kurilpa
- In office 3 August 1957 – 28 May 1960
- Preceded by: Thomas Moores
- Succeeded by: Clive Hughes

Personal details
- Born: Peter David Connolly; 29 September 1920 Sydney, New South Wales, Australia
- Died: 2 May 2009 (aged 88) Brisbane, Queensland, Australia
- Party: Liberal Party
- Spouse: Claudia Hartley (m.1957)
- Education: University of Queensland
- Occupation: Judge of the Supreme Court of Queensland

Peter David Connolly QC (29 September 1920- 3 May 2009) was an Australian politician and judge of the Supreme Court of Queensland.

Born in Sydney in 1920, Connolly moved to Brisbane as a child. Connolly went to Marist Rosalie (Marist Brothers College Rosalie) until 1934, where he before winning a scholarship to St Joseph's College, Gregory Terrace, where he was both Dux and Head Boy in his final year in 1936. Connolly served in the 2nd Australian Imperial Force between 1940 and 1946. After studying law at the University of Queensland, he was admitted as a barrister in 1949.

Connolly was elected to the Legislative Assembly of Queensland in the 1957 Queensland state election for the Liberal Party. He served as MLA for Kurilpa from 1957 to 1960, but lost re-endorsement to his former campaign manager Clive Hughes in 1960; as a result, Connolly returned to the Bar, and was appointed Queen's Counsel in 1963.

Connolly was appointed as a judge of the Supreme Court of Queensland in 1978, serving until his retirement in 1990. He was known as a conservative 'black-letter lawyer' during his service in Parliament and on the bench. During his judicial service, he was made a Commander of the Order of the British Empire.

Connolly died on 3 May 2009. As of 2011, he was the most recent judge of the Supreme Court of Queensland to have served in Parliament prior to his judicial service.

== See also ==
- Judiciary of Australia
- List of Judges of the Supreme Court of Queensland

Parliament of Queensland
Preceded by Thomas Moores	Member for Kurilpa; 1957–1960	Succeeded by Clive Hughes
