= Afghanistan Premier League (2026) =

Cricket tournament in Afghanistan

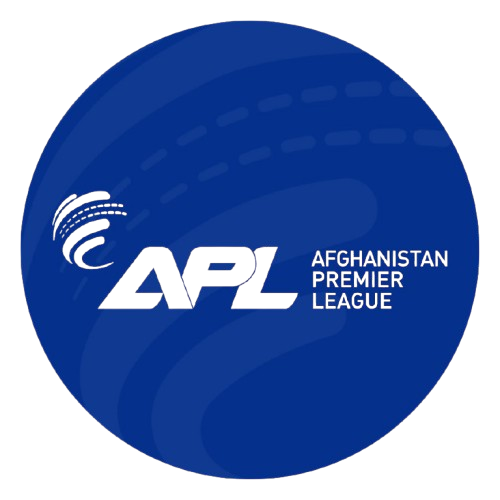
- Tournament logo
- Countries: Afghanistan
- Administrator: Afghanistan Cricket Board
- Format: Twenty20
- First edition: 2026–27
- Next edition: 2027
- Tournament format: Double round-robin and Knockout
- Number of teams: 5
- Website: apl-t20.com
- 2026–27

The Afghanistan Premier League is a Twenty20 franchise cricket tournament run by the Afghanistan Cricket Board (ACB). Founded in 2025, and first contested during the 2026 season. It is contested by five teams based in cities around the country.

== History ==
The 2026 Afghanistan Premier League marked the revival of the Afghanistan Premier League after an eight-year hiatus. The tournament had previously been held only once in 2018 before being discontinued because of commercial disputes, contractual issues, and concerns surrounding the league's administration. Following several years of uncertainty, the Afghanistan Cricket Board (ACB) announced in December 2025 that the league would return as a five-team franchise Twenty20 competition, with matches scheduled to be played in the United Arab Emirates (UAE).

In August 2026, the five represented cities were announced. On 26 August, the APL announced the first three franchise owners, Akcel United Kabul, Balkh Zwanan and Kandahar Warriors.

The Player Draft will be held on 27 September 2026. The Player Registration Window Extended Until October 5, the player draft will be held on 24 October in United Arab Emirates. The first edition held on 27 December 2026.

On 23 October 2026, the Afghanistan Cricket Board announced that the captains and coaches draft for the five participating franchises would be held on 24 October in the United Arab Emirates. The franchises would select their captains, head coaches from shortlisted candidates, while the ACB would appoint assistant coaches and other coaching staff. On 25 October, ACB confirmed the captains, head coaches and mentors of all five participating franchises. The ACB also confirmed that the players draft had been scheduled for 3 November 2026 in Dubai. On 3 November 2026, the Players' Draft for the tournament was held at Le Méridien Dubai Hotel & Conference Centre in Dubai, United Arab Emirates. Kandahar Warriors selected Pakistani fast bowler Muhammad Amir as the first pick of the draft. Other notable players selected in the Platinum category included Moeen Ali, Alex Hales, Johnson Charles and Wanindu Hasaranga. The five franchises completed their squads over 18 rounds, selecting a total of 90 players from a draft pool of 462.

== Organisation ==
The five teams play each other twice in the group stages of the competition before the top four teams move to the playoffs stage.

=== Trophy ===
The trophy was unveiled in August 2026.

== Teams ==
=== Current ===
In August 2026, the five represented cities were announced. On 26 August, the APL announced the first three franchise owners, Akcel United Kabul, Kandahar Warriors, and Balkh Zwanan. On 25 October, APL confirmed the captains and head coaches of all five participating franchises. On November, Nangarhar Cosmic was announced as one of the franchises.

Afghanistan Premier League (2026) (Afghanistan)
Team	City	Debut	Captain	Head coach	Owner(s)
Akcel United Kabul	Kabul	2026	Azmatullah Omarzai	Shane McDermott	
Team Balkh	Balkh	2026	Ibrahim Zadran	Mickey Arthur	
Kandahar Warriors	Kandahar	2026	Rashid Khan	Ravi Bopara	
Nangarhar Cosmic	Nangarhar	2026	Rahmat Shah	Toby Radford	
Team Paktia	Paktia	2026	Rahmanullah Gurbaz	Azhar Mahmood	

== Tournament results ==
Season	Final				Player of the series
Season	Winner	Result	Runners-up	Venue	Player of the series
2026					

== Team performances ==
Seasons Teams	2026
Akcel United Kabul	
Team Balkh	
Kandahar Warriors	
Nangarhar Cosmic	
Team Paktia	

- C: Champions
- RU: Runner-up
- SF: Team qualified for the semi-final of the competition

== See also ==
- Afghanistan Premier League
