= James Fry (politician) =

Australian politician

Member of the Queensland Legislative Assembly for Kurilpa
- In office 16 March 1918 – 11 June 1932
- Preceded by: William Hartley
- Succeeded by: Patrick Copley

Personal details
- Born: James Porter Fry; 1880 West End, Queensland, Australia
- Died: 7 February 1948 (aged 67 or 68) Redcliffe, Queensland, Australia
- Resting place: Toowong Cemetery
- Party: Country and Progressive National Party
- Other political affiliations: Queensland United Party, National
- Spouse: Sarah Chegwin (m.1902 d.1957)
- Occupation: Optometrist

James Porter Fry (1880 – 7 February 1948) was a member of the Queensland Legislative Assembly.

== Biography ==
Fry was born in West End, Queensland, the son of Charles Fry and his wife Caroline (née Davies). he was educated at West End State School and in World War I he joined the AIF with at first, the 3rd Infantry Battalion where he was a member of the Special Tropical Corps in November 1914 and later the 9th Battalion where he was stationed in France. He returned to Australia in late 1915 with the rank of Major.

In 1918, he became an optometrist. He married Sarah Chegwin (died 1957) in 1902 and they had one son and one daughter. Fry died in February 1948 at Redcliffe and was buried in the Toowong Cemetery.

== Public career ==
Fry held the seat of Kurilpa, first for the National then later the Queensland United Party and the Country and Progressive National Party in the Queensland Legislative Assembly from 1918 until his defeat by Labor's Patrick Copley in 1932.

Parliament of Queensland
Preceded by William Hartley	Member for Kurilpa; 1918–1932	Succeeded by Patrick Copley
