= Zahid Ahmad (Afghan cricketer) =

Afghan cricketer (born 2003)

Personal information
- Born: 23 January 2003 (age 23)
- Role: Wicket-keeper

Domestic team information
- Years: Team
- 2019–: Kunar Province
- Source: Cricinfo, 9 December 2021

Zahid Ahmad (born 23 January 2003) is an Afghan cricketer. He made his first-class debut for Kunar Province in the 2018–19 Mirwais Nika Provincial 3-Day tournament on 7 March 2019.
