= Sam Doumany =

Australian retired politician

The Honourable Sam Doumany AM

Deputy Leader of the Queensland Liberal Party
- In office 23 December 1980 – 14 August 1983
- Leader: Llew Edwards
- Preceded by: Fred Campbell
- Succeeded by: Angus Innes

Attorney-General of Queensland and Minister for Justice
- In office 23 December 1980 – 18 August 1983
- Premier: Joh Bjelke-Petersen
- Preceded by: Bill Lickiss
- Succeeded by: Neville Harper

Minister for Welfare
- In office 2 October 1978 – 23 December 1980
- Premier: Joh Bjelke-Petersen
- Preceded by: Bill Lickiss
- Succeeded by: Terry White

Member of the Queensland Legislative Assembly for Kurilpa
- In office 7 December 1974 – 22 October 1983
- Preceded by: Clive Hughes
- Succeeded by: Anne Warner

Personal details
- Born: Samuel Sydney Doumany; 2 September 1937 (age 88) Sydney, New South Wales, Australia
- Party: Liberal Party
- Occupation: Economist

Samuel Sydney Doumany AM (born 2 September 1937) is an Australian retired politician. He was a Member of the Queensland Legislative Assembly and Attorney-General and Minister for Justice in Queensland.

== Political career ==
Doumany was elected to the Legislative Assembly of Queensland as the Liberal candidate for Kurilpa at the 1974 election.

He was Minister for Welfare from 10 October 1978 to 23 December 1980. He was Minister for Justice and Attorney-General from 23 December 1980 to 18 August 1983.

He held Kurilpa until the 1983 election when he was defeated by Labor candidate Anne Warner.

== Honours ==
In 2022, Doumany was appointed as a Member of the Order of Australia (AM) in the 2022 Australia Day Honours for "significant service to parliament and politics in Queensland, and to the community".

== See also ==
- Members of the Queensland Legislative Assembly, 1974–1977; 1977–1980; 1980–1983

Parliament of Queensland
Preceded by Clive Hughes	Member for Kurilpa; 1974–1983	Succeeded by Anne Warner
