= Hayatullah (Afghan cricketer) =

Afghan cricketer

Personal information
- Full name: Hayatullah
- Source: Cricinfo, 11 October 2019

Hayatullah is an Afghan cricketer. He made his first-class debut on 20 February 2019, for Kunduz Province in the 2018–19 Mirwais Nika Provincial 3-Day. He scored a century and was named the player of the match. He made his Twenty20 debut on 7 October 2019, for Band-e-Amir Dragons in the 2019 Shpageeza Cricket League.
