= Electoral district of Kurilpa =

Former state electoral district of Queensland

Kurilpa Queensland—Legislative Assembly
- State: Queensland
- Dates current: 1912–1986
- Namesake: Kurilpa Peninsula
- Demographic: Metropolitan

Kurilpa was a Legislative Assembly electorate in the state of Queensland from 1912 to 1986. It was named for the Kurilpa Peninsula on the Brisbane River. Until 1960, it was based in the inner southern Brisbane suburbs of West End and the western parts of South Brisbane, but after that, it also included Dutton Park, Fairfield, Highgate Hill and parts of Yeronga and Annerley.

The seat was created at the 1910 distribution out of part of the two-member South Brisbane seat, and was abolished at the distribution ahead of the 1986 election. The seat's last member, Anne Warner, transferred to South Brisbane, which absorbed most of Kurilpa's territory.

== Members for Kurilpa ==
Member	Party	Term
James Allan	Liberal (Qld.)	1912–1915
William Hartley	Labor	1915–1918
James Fry	National	1918–1922
James Fry	United Party	1922–1925
James Fry	CPNP	1925–1932
Kerry Copley	Labor	1932–1949
Tom Moores	Labor	1949–1957
Tom Moores	QLP	1957–1957
Peter Connolly	Liberal	1957–1960
Clive Hughes	Liberal	1960–1974
Sam Doumany	Liberal	1974–1983
Anne Warner	Labor	1983–1986

== See also ==
- Electoral districts of Queensland
- Members of the Queensland Legislative Assembly by year
- Category:Members of the Queensland Legislative Assembly by name
