= Shane McDermott (cricket coach) =

Australian cricket coach and former cricketer

Personal information
- Full name: Shane Timothy McDermott
- Born: December 28, 1980 (age 45); Launceston, Tasmania, Australia
- Batting: Left handed
- Role: Wicket keeper

Domestic team information
- Years: Team
- 2001/02 to 2002/03: Tasmania Second XI
- 2002: Tasmania Institute of Sport
- 2008: Northern Territory Chief Minister's XI

Shane Timothy McDermott (born 28 December 1980) is an Australian cricket coach and former cricketer who works as a fielding coach in domestic and international cricket. He has held fielding and high performance roles with national teams including Sri Lanka, Bangladesh, Afghanistan and Pakistan, alongside coaching work in Australian domestic programs.

== Early life and career ==
McDermott was born in Launceston, Tasmania. He completed his education at St. Patrick's College.

As a cricketer, McDermott played as a left hand batter and wicket keeper for Launceston Cricket Club. He represented Tasmania at under-17 and under-19 level before progressing into second XI cricket. He also appeared for the Tasmania Institute of Sport and the Northern Territory Chief Minister's XI in Australian representative cricket.

== Coaching career ==
McDermott began his career as a Cricket Tasmania's game development officer in the early 2000s. Later, he coached Western Australia, South Australia. He also served as the head coach at the Northern Territory Institute of Sport.

From 2006 to 2008, McDermott worked for the Bangladesh Cricket Board as fielding coach, head coach of the national academy, and a high performance fitness coordinator.

From 2012 to 2019, McDermott worked at Cricket Australia's National Cricket Centre in Brisbane as a fielding coach and analyst.

In 2019, McDermott became Sri Lanka's fielding coach. In March 2022, the Bangladesh Cricket Board appointed him as the Bangladesh national cricket team fielding coach till November 2023.

In January 2024, the Afghanistan Cricket Board appointed McDermott as the senior men's team fielding coach. During his coaching tenure, Afghanistan went on to reach the semi finals of the ICC Men's T20 World Cup in 2024 after defeating Bangladesh in a rain affected Super Eight match. In July 2025, the Pakistan Cricket Board appointed him as the men's all format fielding coach ahead of a tour of Bangladesh, succeeding Mohammad Masroor in the role. He resigned in July 2026, rejoining Afghanistan as assistant and fielding coach from August 2026 onwards. His successor as Pakistan fielding coach was Mansoor Amjad.
