= Anne Warner (Australian politician) =

Australian politician

The Honourable Anne Warner AM
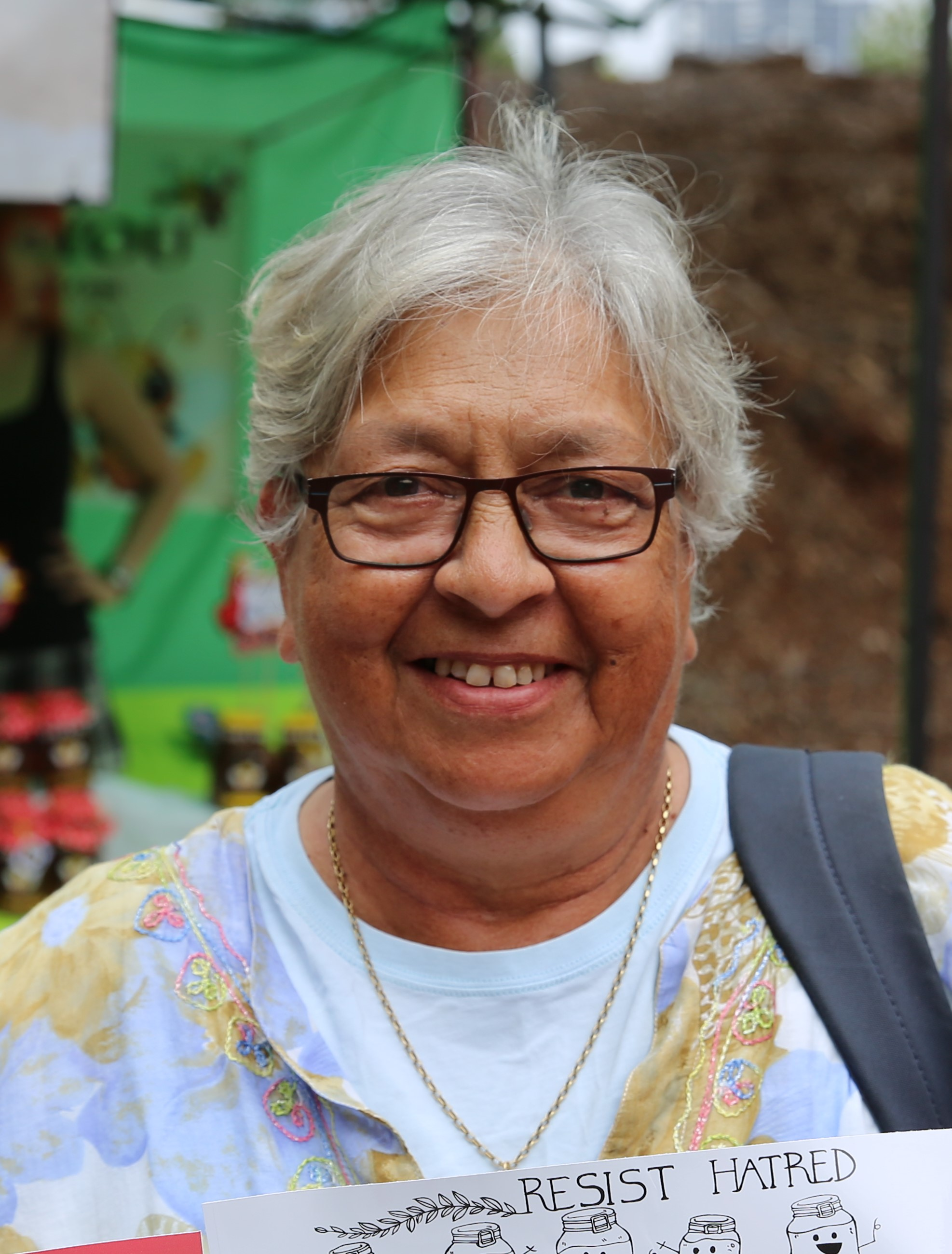

Member of the Queensland Legislative Assembly for Kurilpa
- In office 22 October 1983 – 1 November 1986
- Preceded by: Sam Doumany
- Succeeded by: Seat abolished

Member of the Queensland Legislative Assembly for South Brisbane
- In office 1 November 1986 – 15 July 1995
- Preceded by: Jim Fouras
- Succeeded by: Anna Bligh

Personal details
- Born: Anne Marie Warner; 5 December 1945 (age 80) Lucknow, United Provinces, British India
- Party: Labor
- Occupation: Union organiser

Anne Marie Warner AM (born 5 December 1945) is an Australian former politician who served in the Queensland Legislative Assembly from 1983 to 1995. She was a government minister under Wayne Goss from 1989 to 1995.

== Early life ==
Warner was born in Lucknow, India, and is of Anglo-Indian descent. She was a social welfare union organiser before entering politics.

== Political career ==
Warner was elected to the Legislative Assembly of Queensland for Kurilpa in 1983, and for South Brisbane in 1986. She was Minister for Family Services and Minister for Aboriginal and Islander Affairs in the Labor Party government of Wayne Goss from 1989 until her retirement in 1995. Her party activity included being a branch President and President of her Electorate Executive, a State Conference delegate and Convenor of the Women's Policy Committee. Warner is married and has three children.

During Warner's six years in opposition, she spoke vociferously on a wide range of issues including civil rights, education, government maladministration, corruption, and child welfare. Throughout her parliamentary career she showed great concern for minority groups and women, especially disadvantaged women, and their right to be free from any sort of discrimination.

== Footnotes ==
Parliament of Queensland
Preceded by Sam Doumany	Member for Kurilpa; 1983–1986	Abolished
Preceded by Jim Fouras	Member for South Brisbane; 1986–1995	Succeeded by Anna Bligh
