= Yousuf Shah =

Afghan cricketer (born 1995)

Personal information
- Born: 18 February 1995 (age 31)
- Source: Cricinfo, 16 February 2019

Yousuf Shah (born 18 February 1995) is an Afghan cricketer. He made his first-class debut for Khost Province in the 2018–19 Mirwais Nika Provincial 3-Day tournament on 15 February 2019. He made his List A debut for Paktia Province in the 2019 Afghanistan Provincial Challenge Cup tournament on 31 July 2019.
