= Kerry Copley =

Australian politician

Member of the Queensland Legislative Assembly for Kurilpa
- In office 11 June 1932 – 18 July 1949
- Preceded by: James Fry
- Succeeded by: Thomas Moores

Personal details
- Born: Patrick Kerry Copley; 11 December 1901 Ipswich, Queensland, Australia
- Died: 18 July 1949 (aged 47) Brisbane, Queensland, Australia
- Resting place: Toowong Cemetery
- Party: Labor
- Spouse: Dorothy Roberts Jones (m.1939)
- Occupation: Barrister

Patrick Kerry Copley (11 December 1901 – 18 July 1949) was a barrister and a member of the Queensland Legislative Assembly.

== Biography ==
Copley was born in Ipswich, Queensland, the son of Patrick Kerry Copley Snr and his wife Ada Cecilia (née Sloane). His brother William (Jack) Copley represented the seat of Bulimba in the Queensland Legislative Assembly. He was educated at Christian Brothers colleges in Ipswich, Maryborough and Townsville and Nudgee College.

In 1920 he worked for the Public Curator's office and in 1924 he was a department representative for the Queensland State Service Union and was its president 1926–1928. He then became a barrister in 1927 and a year later had his own law practice. He married Dorothy Roberts Jones in February 1939. Copley died of a heart attack in July 1949 and his funeral proceeded from St Stephen's Catholic Cathedral to the Toowong Cemetery.

== Public career ==
Copley, for the Labor Party, contested the seat of Kurilpa at the 1929 Queensland state election but was defeated by the sitting member, James Fry. He contested Kurilpa again in 1932 and defeated Fry on the back of a state-wide swing to Labor. He went on to hold the seat until his death in 1949.

He was a keen sportsman and was a member of the Queensland Amateur Athletics Association, the South Brisbane Harriers, and the West End Cricket Club. He was secretary of the St Vincent de Paul Society and the Nudgee Orphanage Committee.

Parliament of Queensland
Preceded by James Fry	Member for Kurilpa; 1932–1949	Succeeded by Thomas Moores
