= Clive Hughes (Queensland politician) =

Australian politician

Member of the Queensland Legislative Assembly for Kurilpa
- In office 28 May 1960 – 7 Dec 1974
- Preceded by: Peter Connolly
- Succeeded by: Sam Doumany

Personal details
- Born: Clive Melwyn Hughes; 15 May 1924 New Farm, Queensland, Australia
- Died: 19 October 2014 (aged 90) Brisbane, Queensland, Australia
- Resting place: Mt Gravatt Cemetery
- Party: Liberal Party
- Spouse(s): Mary Donovan (m.1946), Margaret O'Brien (m.1965)
- Relations: Verity Barton (grand-daughter)
- Occupation: Teacher

Clive Melwyn Hughes (15 May 1924 – 19 October 2014) was a member of the Queensland Legislative Assembly.

== Biography ==
Hughes was born in New Farm, Queensland, the son of Isaac John Hughes and his wife Myra May (née Naylor). He was educated at local state schools and served in the RAAF during World War II, achieving the rank of Leading Aircraftman.

On 15 June 1946 he married Mary Donovan and together had two sons and one daughter. He then married Margaret O'Brien on 5 September 1965 and they had one son. Hughes died in October 2014 and was buried in the Mt Gravatt Cemetery.

== Public career ==
Hughes was the alderman in the Brisbane City Council from 1955 until 1961. He challenged Peter Connolly, the sitting member for Kurilpa in the Queensland Legislative Assembly for pre-selection as the Liberal Party candidate for the 1960 state election and won both the selection for the party and the seat. He remained the member until he retired at the 1974 state election.

He was a trustee for the Queensland Society for the Blind and the Kurilpa Child Care Centre. In March 1974 he was found not guilty of charges of false pretences involving the purchase of a flat in Fairfield. His granddaughter, Verity Barton, was the member for Broadwater in the Queensland Legislative Assembly from 2012-2017.

Parliament of Queensland
Preceded by Peter Connolly	Member for Kurilpa; 1960–1974	Succeeded by Sam Doumany
