= Norman Callaway =

Australian cricketer (1896-1917)

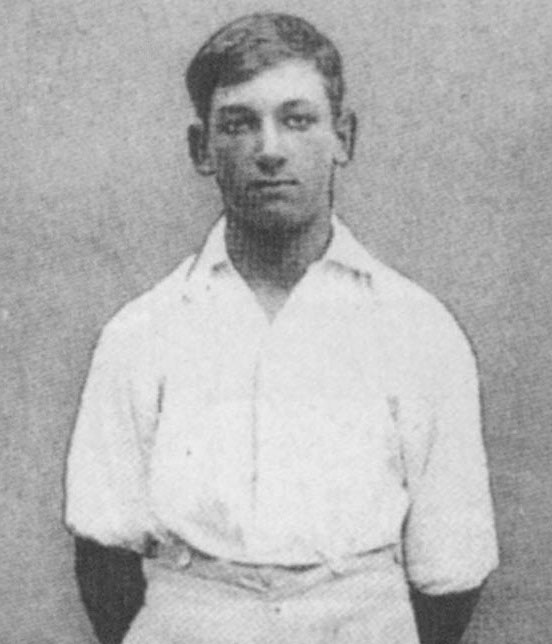

Personal information
- Full name: Norman Frank Callaway
- Born: 5 April 1896; Hay, New South Wales, Australia
- Died: 3 May 1917 (aged 21); Bullecourt, Pas-de-Calais, France
- Batting: Right-handed
- Role: Batsman

Domestic team information
- Years: Team
- 1914/15: New South Wales

Career statistics
| Competition | First-class |
|---|---|
| Matches | 1 |
| Runs scored | 207 |
| Batting average | 207.00 |
| 100s/50s | 1/0 |
| Top score | 207 |
| Catches/stumpings | 2/– |
- Source: Cricinfo, 15 June 2013

Norman Frank Callaway (5 April 1896 – 3 May 1917) was an Australian first class cricketer and Australian Imperial Force (AIF) soldier. Born in Hay, New South Wales to Thomas and Emily, Callaway moved to Sydney and played for Sydney grade cricket teams Paddington and Waverley. He scored a double century in his one and only first-class cricket match. He was killed in action during World War I.

== Club career ==
Callaway appeared for Paddington in Sydney Grade Cricket in 1913–14, playing alongside Monty Noble. On his first appearance at the age of 17 years and 175 days, he top scored with 41 against Balmain, followed by 16 and 26 (top score again) against University and 137 not out with 24 boundaries against Middle Harbor. Sydney Morning Herald went on a stream of praise for the hundred, calling it "a splendid innings, entirely free from blemish", and about the "crispness and strength of his driving", "straight bat" and "splendid judgment" He scored 578 runs in the season for Paddington at an average of 41.28 and took three wickets. In January 1914, Callaway scored an impressive 129, and a duck in the second innings, in a New South Wales Colts v Victorian Colts match at the Melbourne Cricket Ground.

At the beginning of the 1914–15 season, Callaway moved to Waverley where one of his team-mates was a young Alan Kippax.

Callaway made his first class debut aged 18 for New South Wales against Queensland at the SCG in February 1915.

== Callaway's debut ==
New South Wales began their innings on the first day after Queensland were all out for 137. Callaway came in to bat at around 4 o'clock with the score at 17 for 3. Callaway and opener Frank Farrar added 41 runs. At the fall of Farrar, the NSW captain Charles Macartney joined Callaway. Macartney was usually a very attacking batsman but on this day he was not well and let Callaway lead the scoring.

"From the first ball he swung the bat with great power and precision at anything within striking distance", tells a report of the day, "and the ball hummed to all parts of the field at an extraordinary pace". Callaway's fifty came up in 67 minutes. At 41, he was missed by McAndrews at point off a tough chance. His second fifty took 27 minutes and the hundred was reached with a "magnificent straight drive that landed on the pickets at the southern end". At the end of the first day he was 125 not out in 130 minutes with 16 fours. He outscored Macartney by 112 runs to 57 during the time they were together.

Callaway grew careless as he passed 150. He was dropped four more times, at 149, 163, 175 and 180. Macartney was caught at mid on for 103 after their stand reached 256 in 155 minutes. Callaway completed his double century, in 206 minutes, just before lunch on the second day as NSW added 146 runs in the first session. Soon after, he was caught at first slip, via the gloves of stand-in wicket-keeper James Sheppard, off John McLaren for 207. He hit 26 fours in 214 minutes. Queensland were out for 100 in their second innings and lost by an innings and 231 runs.

The newspapers of the day raved about his batting. The Mercury called it the best cricket seen on the ground for the season. The Sydney Morning Herald praised the power of his strokeplay, gritty temperament and the ability to play a long innings. But it felt that "Callaway is not yet a stylist. He holds the bat near the end of the handle and plays the ball at an unusual distance from his body. This method, of course, imparts power to his strokes, though from the defense point of view, it appears to leave considerable openings".

The Sydney Cricket Ground had an outfield of thick grass which made it very difficult to score boundaries. The mighty Macartney had only five fours in his hundred (two of which were all run), yet Callaway hit 26 fours. The Sydney Morning Herald conjectured that if the ground was in its normal condition, he would have made another 50. "He certainly should rise to great heights", the paper concluded, "all going well with him".

== Remaining life ==
In 1916, before he played another first-class match, Callaway enlisted in the AIF and was posted to the 19th Battalion as a Private. He left Sydney in October and was posted in France late in December. He was reported missing in action in the Second Battle of Bullecourt on 3 May 1917. By September 1917, it was confirmed that Callaway had died on the same day. His memorial is in Villers-Bretonneux, France.

In the pavilion at Waverly Oval, a large photograph of Callaway was hung with the lines of the poet Robert W. Service attached :

And though there's never a grave to tell,
Nor a cross to mark his fall,
Thank God! we know that he "batted well"
In the last great Game of all.

Callaway holds the record for the highest first-class batting average.

== Notes ==
Some sources, including the Sydney Morning Herald reports of the day, call Callaway the first batsman to score a double century on first class debut. The definition of first class matches has changed over time. As per the modern classification, Callaway is the second, after Tom Marsden who scored 227 for Sheffield and Leicester against Nottingham in 1826.

== See also ==
- List of cricketers who were killed during military service
