= Ghazi Amanullah Town =

Settlement in Nangarhar Province, Afghanistan

Coordinates: 34°18′04.2″N 70°38′50.7″E

Ghazi Amanullah Khan Town غازي امان الله خان ښارګوټی
- Interactive map of Ghazi Amanullah Khan Town
- Country: Afghanistan
- Province: Nangarhar Province
- Time zone: UTC+4:30

Ghazi Amanullah Khan Town (Pashto: غازي امان الله خان مېنه) is a planned community located next to the Kabul–Jalalabad Road roughly 15 miles (24 km) southeast of Jalalabad in Nangarhar Province of Afghanistan.

The developers of the neighborhood set aside land for the construction of Ghazi Amanullah International Cricket Stadium, which now hosts regular cricket matches.

== See also ==
- Nangarhar Province
