= Amol Muzumdar =

Indian cricketer

Personal information
- Full name: Amol Anil Muzumdar
- Born: 11 November 1974 (age 52); Mumbai, Maharashtra, India
- Batting: Right-handed
- Bowling: Right-arm leg break
- Role: Batsman

Domestic team information
- Years: Team
- 1993–2009: Mumbai
- 2009–2011: Assam
- 2012–2013: Andhra Pradesh

Head coaching information
- Years: Team
- October 2023–present: India women's national cricket team

Career statistics
Competition	FC	LA	T20
Matches	171	113	14
Runs scored	11,167	3,286	174
Batting average	48.13	38.20	19.33
100s/50s	30/60	3/26	0/1
Top score	260	109	57
Balls bowled	414	96	–
Wickets	6	2	–
Bowling average	36.00	45.50	–
5 wickets in innings	0	0	–
10 wickets in match	0	0	–
Best bowling	1/1	1/11	–
Catches/stumpings	162/–	37/–	3/–
Medal record
Women's cricket
Representing India as Coach
ICC Cricket World Cup
Winner	2025 India
Asian Games
Gold medal – first place	2026 Aichi–Nagoya
- Source: ESPNcricinfo, 16 December 2013

Amol Anil Muzumdar (born 11 November 1974) is an Indian cricket coach and former cricketer who previously played for the cricket teams of Mumbai and Assam. He was primarily a right-handed batsman. He held the record for the most runs scored in the Ranji Trophy, India's premier domestic first-class cricket competition, beating the record previously held by Amarjit Kaypee. In October 2023, BCCI appointed Amol as the head coach of the India women's national cricket team. In 2025, under his coaching, the Indian women's cricket team won their maiden ICC Women's ODI World Cup.

== Education ==
Muzumdar attended B P M High School before transferring to Sharadashram Vidyamandir School as requested by Ramakant Achrekar, his coach. In the latter high school, Muzumdar met Sachin Tendulkar, who had the same coach.

Muzumdar stated during his appearance on Kaun Banega Crorepati on 5 December 2025 that he started playing cricket because of his father, who was considered a good club cricketer in Mumbai.

== Career ==
On his first-class debut for Mumbai Muzumdar scored 260 runs against Haryana in Faridabad during a Ranji Trophy match in the 1993–94 season. He had the world record for any player on their debut in first-class cricket until it was beaten by Ajay Rohera in December 2018.

Muzumdar was named as the vice captain of the Indian U-19 cricket team for their tour of England in 1994. He was regarded as one of the country's finest prospects and was labelled the "new Tendulkar". He also played for the India A side in the 1994–95 season alongside Rahul Dravid and Sourav Ganguly.

Despite his stellar first-class numbers, Muzumdar was never selected to play for the India national cricket team. While his contemporaries Tendulkar, Dravid, and Ganguly played at international games, he was never selected for the full India national cricket team for Tests and ODIs.

Muzumdar considered quitting the game in 2002, but since then, he has continued to serve the Mumbai cricket team. In the 2006–07 season, he was appointed captain and won the Ranji Trophy. In January 2007, he had the highest amount of runs in the Ranji Trophy for Mumbai, beating the record set by Ashok Mankad.

In September 2009, Amol moved to the cricket team Assam after finding out he was not selected in the Mumbai squad for the Mushtaq Ali T20 trophy.

In October 2012, he signed with Andhra Pradesh for two years. Three matches before the 2013–14 Ranji Trophy ended, Muzumdar decided to drop out of the season because he stated that "it is time for the youngsters to play the rest of the three matches in the season".

=== Coaching career ===
Mazumdar was appointed as a batting coach for the India Under-19 cricket team and the India Under-23 cricket team.

In December 2013, Mazumdar was appointed as a batting consultant for the Netherlands cricket team.

In 2018, Mazumdar was appointed as a batting coach for the Rajasthan Royals in the 2018 IPL for 3 seasons: 2017–18, 2018–19, and 2019–20. As of 2021, Muzumdar is still working for the Rajasthan Royals. He was appointed as a batting coach (interim) for the South Africa national cricket team when South Africa toured India. He is now the head coach for the Mumbai squad.

In October 2023, BCCI appointed Amol Muzumdar as the head coach of the India women's national cricket team. Under his coaching and stewardship, the India Women's cricket team won the 2025 Women's Cricket World Cup.
