= Waqarullah Ishaq =

Afghan cricketer (born 1999)

Personal information
- Born: 2 December 1999 (age 26)
- Batting: Right-handed
- Bowling: Right-arm medium

Domestic team information
- Years: Team
- 2017–present: Mis Ainak Region
- Source: Cricinfo, 11 August 2017

Waqarullah Ishaq (born 2 December 1999) is an Afghan cricketer. He made his List A debut for Mis Ainak Region in the 2017 Ghazi Amanullah Khan Regional One Day Tournament on 11 August 2017.

In December 2017, he was named in Afghanistan's squad for the 2018 Under-19 Cricket World Cup.

He made his first-class debut for Boost Region in the 2018 Ahmad Shah Abdali 4-day Tournament on 1 March 2018. In September 2018, he was named in Kandahar's squad in the first edition of the Afghanistan Premier League tournament. He made his Twenty20 debut on 8 October 2019, for Boost Defenders in the 2019 Shpageeza Cricket League.
