= Abdu'l-Aziz Khan =

Abdu'l-Aziz Khan may refer to:

- Abd al-Aziz Khan (Bukhara) (1614–1683), ruler of the Khanate of Bukhara (1645–1680)
- Abdulaziz (1830–1876), Ottoman sultan
- Abdul Aziz Khan (cricketer) (fl. 1912–1926)
- Abdul Aziz Khan Kaka, Pashtun Nationalist representing freedom fighters against the British Raj
