= Abdullah Ahmadzai =

Afghan cricketer (born 2003)

Personal information
- Born: 26 June 2003 (age 23); Nangarhar, Afghanistan
- Batting: Right-handed
- Bowling: Right arm medium-fast
- Role: Bowler

International information
- National side: Afghanistan
- T20I debut (cap 60): 5 September 2025 v United Arab Emirates
- Last T20I: 17 September 2026 v India

Domestic team information
- Years: Team
- 2023/24: Speenghar Tigers
- 2024/25: Pamir Legends
- 2024: Band-e-Amir Dragons
- 2025: Maiwand Champions
- 2025: Hindukush Strikers
- 2025: Amo Sharks

Career statistics
| Competition | T20I | FC | LA | T20 |
|---|---|---|---|---|
| Matches | 7 | 3 | 7 | 19 |
| Runs scored | 6 | 13 | 93 | 18 |
| Batting average | – | 3.25 | 18.60 | 6.00 |
| 100s/50s | 0/0 | 0/0 | 0/0 | 0/0 |
| Top score | 6* | 9 | 43 | 6* |
| Balls bowled | 130 | 502 | 304 | 355 |
| Wickets | 11 | 7 | 8 | 26 |
| Bowling average | 18.63 | 45.00 | 33.62 | 18.26 |
| 5 wickets in innings | 0 | 0 | 0 | 0 |
| 10 wickets in match | 0 | 0 | 0 | 0 |
| Best bowling | 3/42 | 3/20 | 3/40 | 4/7 |
| Catches/stumpings | 3/– | 3/– | 2/– | 4/– |
- Source: ESPNcricinfo, 18 September 2026

Abdullah Ahmadzai (born 26 June 2003) is an Afghan cricketer. He made his international debut for the Afghanistan cricket team in September 2025 against United Arab Emirates in the 2025 United Arab Emirates T20I Tri-Nation Series. In domestic cricket, he plays for the Amo Sharks and Hindukush Strikers.

== Career ==
Ahmadzai made his List A debut for Speenghar Tigers on 3 November 2023, in the 2023 Ghazi Amanullah Khan Regional One Day Tournament. He made his Twenty20 debut for Band-e-Amir Dragons on 18 August 2024, in the 2024 Shpageeza Cricket League. He made his first-class debut for Pamir Legends on 22 September 2025, in the 2024–25 Ahmad Shah Abdali 4-day Tournament.

Ahmadzai began to represent Afghanistan in international cricket in the second half of 2025. He was named in Afghanistan's squad for their T20I tri-series against Pakistan and the United Arab Emirates, replacing the Naveen-ul-Haq who was suffering from a shoulder injury. He was also named as one of Afghanistan's reserve players for the 2025 Asia Cup. He played one match in the tri-series, making his debut against United Arab Emirates of 5 September 2025. During the Asia Cup, with Naveen-ul-Haq still recovering from his shoulder injury, Ahmadzai was added to Afghanistan's squad after their first match. He didn't playing during the Asia Cup, but he returned to the squad for two subsequent T20I series against Bangladesh and Zimbabwe, playing all three matches against Zimbabwe. After this he was named in Afghanistan A's squad for the 2025 Asia Cup Rising Stars.

On 31 December 2025, Ahmadzai was named in Afghanistan's squad for the 2026 Men's T20 World Cup.
