= Naseer Khan Maroofkhil =

Afghan cricketer (born 2006)

Personal information
- Born: 30 January 2006 (age 20)
- Batting: Left-handed
- Bowling: Slow left-arm orthodox
- Role: Bowler

International information
- National side: Afghanistan (2026–present)
- Only Test (cap 44): 13 November 2026 v Zimbabwe

Career statistics
| Competition | Test | FC | LA | T20 |
|---|---|---|---|---|
| Matches | 1 | 12 | 17 | 24 |
| Runs scored | 121 | 361 | 123 | 30 |
| Batting average | 121.00 | 22.56 | 17.57 | 15.00 |
| 100s/50s | 1/0 | 1/1 | 0/0 | 0/0 |
| Top score | 101* | 101* | 49 | 22* |
| Balls bowled | 486 | 1,812 | 918 | 492 |
| Wickets | 9 | 42 | 8 | 21 |
| Bowling average | 28.55 | 20.19 | 78.87 | 27.04 |
| 5 wickets in innings | 1 | 3 | 0 | 0 |
| 10 wickets in match | 0 | 1 | 0 | 0 |
| Best bowling | 7/151 | 7/151 | 2/49 | 2/9 |
| Catches/stumpings | 0/– | 3/– | 4/– | 2/– |
- Source: Cricinfo, 18 November 2026

Naseer Khan Maroofkhil (born 30 January 2006) is an Afghan cricketer. He made his first-class debut for Hindukush Strikers in the 2024–25 Ahmad Shah Abdali 4-day Tournament on 22 September 2024. He was the captain of the Afghanistan squad for the 2024 Under-19 Cricket World Cup. He made his List A debut on 30 April 2023, for Junior Champions in the 2023 Green Afghanistan One Day Cup.

He made his Test debut in November 2026 against Zimbabwe in Sharjah, taking 7 for 151 in Zimbabwe's first innings and scoring 101 not out in Afghanistan's second innings.
