= Toby Radford =

Welsh cricketer, coach, and administrator

Personal information
- Full name: Toby Alexander Radford
- Born: 3 December 1971 (age 54); Caerphilly, Glamorgan, Wales
- Batting: Right-handed
- Bowling: Right-arm off break
- Role: Batsman

Domestic team information
- Years: Team
- 1994–1995: Middlesex
- 1996–1997: Sussex
- 1998–1999: Berkshire
- 2002: Hampshire Cricket Board

Career statistics
Competition	First-class	List A
Matches	14	6
Runs scored	476	159
Batting average	26.44	31.80
100s/50s	0/5	0/1
Top score	69*	82
Balls bowled	6	–
Wickets	1	–
Bowling average	0.00	–
5 wickets in innings	0	–
10 wickets in match	0	–
Best bowling	1/0	–
Catches/stumpings	13/–	0/–
- Source: Cricinfo, 11 June 2012

Toby Alexander Radford (born 3 December 1971) is a Welsh cricket coach, former first-class cricketer and cricket administrator.

== First-class career ==
The son of journalist Brian Radford, Radford was born at Caerphilly in Glamorgan in 1971. He played for Middlesex between 1993 and 1995, Sussex between 1996 and 1997, and Berkshire in 1999 as a right-handed opening batsman and an occasional off spiner. He played a total of 14 first-class and six List A matches. He also played for England in six Youth Tests with a personal best of 79 run against New Zealand in Auckland.

== Coach ==
Upon leaving first-class cricket, he played two full seasons for Berkshire and served the Berkshire Cricket Board as its Cricket Development Officer. After a successful spell as Director of the Middlesex Cricket Academy at Finchley, he was appointed 1st XI Coach by Middlesex on 7 November 2007. The highlight of his tenure was when Middlesex won the 2008 Twenty20 Cup.

In addition to winning the Twenty20 Cup, Radford won the Second Eleven Trophy when in charge of that team, gained promotion to the Pro40 League in his first season with the First Eleven and is recognised as having resurrected England captain Andrew Strauss' international batting career.

Radford then moved on to an elite specialist batting coach, working primarily with the ECB at their training headquarters in Loughborough.

After working for the West Indies in Barbados, Radford was appointed Head Coach at Glamorgan County Cricket Club in October 2013, taking over from Matthew Mott. He left after two years in the role on 30 December 2015. In December 2023 he was appointed as the batting coach of Kent County Cricket Club.

== Career best performances ==
	Batting			
Format	Score	Fixture	Venue	Season
First-class	69 *	Middlesex v Essex	Chelmsford	1995
List A	82	Middlesex v Surrey	The Oval	1995
