= Christopher Wood (cricketer, born 1934) =

English cricketer

Christopher Harland Wood (23 July 1934 – 28 June 2006) was an English first-class cricketer, who played four matches of first-class cricket for Yorkshire County Cricket Club in 1959, against Essex, Hampshire, Derbyshire and the touring Indian team. He also played for Yorkshire against Ireland in the same year, without success.

Born in Manningham, Bradford, Yorkshire, England, Wood was a right arm fast medium bowler, who took eleven wickets at an average of 29.00, with a best of 4 for 39 on debut against Essex; and a right-handed late order batsman who scored 22 runs at 7.33, with a best score of 10. He also took one catch.

Wood died in June 2006, aged 71.
