= Ghazi Amanullah International Cricket Stadium =

Cricket stadium in Nangarhar, Afghanistan

Ghazi Amanullah Khan Cricket Stadium غازي امان الله خان کرکټ لوبغالی
- Interactive map of Ghazi Amanullah Khan Cricket Stadium غازي امان الله خان کرکټ لوبغالی

Ground information
- Location: Ghazi Amanullah Town, Nangarhar Province, Afghanistan
- Country: Afghanistan
- Coordinates: 34°16′59″N 70°39′11″E
- Establishment: 2008; 18 years ago
- Capacity: 14,000
- Owner: Government of Nangarhar Province
- Operator: Afghanistan Cricket Board
- Tenants: Spin Ghar Tigers; Nangarhar Province cricket team Afghanistan national cricket team
- End names
- n/a

International information

Team information
Nangarhar Province cricket team	(2011-)
Afghanistan cricket team	(2011-)
- As of February 02, 2020; Source: ESPNCricinfo

The Ghazi Amanullah Khan Cricket Stadium (Pashto: غازي امان الله خان کرکټ لوبغالی) is located in the eastern Nangarhar Province of Afghanistan, a short distance to the east of Jalalabad in the new Ghazi Amanullah Town. It became the first international cricket stadium in the country and has been hosting regional cricket matches for over a decade now.

Construction of the stadium began in March 2010 when the foundation stone was laid by Minister of Finance and then-president of the Afghanistan Cricket Board, Omar Zakhilwal. The project was developed on 30 acres of land donated by the developer constructing Ghazi Amanullah Town. The first phase of construction, which took a year to complete, cost $1.8 million, and included the completion of the basic stadium. A pavilion, accommodation for players and administrative buildings were constructed later.

It is hoped that the stadium will be able to attract international teams to play Afghanistan, which is now a Full Member of the International Cricket Council.

== See also ==
- List of cricket grounds in Afghanistan
