= Tom Moores (politician) =

Australian politician

Member of the Queensland Legislative Assembly for Kurilpa
- In office 10 September 1949 – 3 Aug 1957
- Preceded by: Kerry Copley
- Succeeded by: Peter Connolly

Personal details
- Born: Thomas Moores; 1 July 1903 Gympie, Queensland, Australia
- Died: 15 July 1983 (aged 80) Brisbane, Queensland, Australia
- Party: QLP
- Other political affiliations: Labor
- Spouse: Monica Annie Lovelock (m.1944)
- Occupation: Teacher

Thomas Moores (1 July 1903 – 15 July 1983) was a member of the Queensland Legislative Assembly.

== Biography ==
Moores was born in Gympie, Queensland, the son of John Thomas Moores and his wife Lucy (née Robinson). He was educated at One Mile State School in Gympie and then attended Brisbane Industrial High School. He worked as a manual training teacher at West End, South Brisbane and Dutton Park Opportunity state schools. In 1935-36 he went to England where he worked as a plumber and then served in the Australian Army from 1942 to 1945.

On 2 September 1944 Moores married Monica Annie Lovelock and together had one daughter. He died in Brisbane in July 1983.

== Public career ==
Moores was the alderman for the Kurilpa ward in the Brisbane City Council from 1939 until 1949. When the member for the state seat of Kurilpa in the Queensland Legislative Assembly, Kerry Copley, died in 1949, Moores won the by-election and went on to represent the seat until 1957. He was one of the members of the Labor Party to defect to the newly formed Queensland Labor Party in 1957. As a member of the QLP he was appointed to the role of Minister for Transport in May of that year but lost his seat three months later.

He was president of the Plumbers Union in the early 1930s and a member of the Queensland Rugby League Committee being a keen supporter of the Souths Rugby League Club.

Parliament of Queensland
Preceded by Kerry Copley	Member for Kurilpa; 1949–1957	Succeeded by Peter Connolly
