= Mohammad Saleem (cricketer) =

Afghan cricketer (born 2002)

Personal information
- Full name: Mohammad Saleem Safi
- Born: 9 September 2002 (age 24); Kabul, Afghanistan
- Batting: Right-handed
- Bowling: Right-arm fast
- Role: Bowler

International information
- National side: Afghanistan
- Test debut (cap 28): 2 February 2024 v Sri Lanka
- Last Test: 6 June 2026 v India
- ODI debut (cap 56): 5 July 2023 v Bangladesh
- Last ODI: 17 June 2026 v India
- Only T20I (cap 55): 17 January 2024 v India

Career statistics
Competition	Test	ODI	T20I	FC
Matches	2	4	1	18
Runs scored	2	10	–	117
Batting average	0.50	10.00	–	7.31
100s/50s	0/0	0/0	–/–	0/0
Top score	2	9	–	28
Balls bowled	235	133	18	2,873
Wickets	6	1	0	58
Bowling average	32.83	181.00	–	28.43
5 wickets in innings	1	0	–	3
10 wickets in match	0	0	–	0
Best bowling	6/140	1/75	–	6/140
Catches/stumpings	0/–	2/–	0/–	8/–
- Source: Cricinfo, 19 July 2026

Mohammad Saleem (born 9 September 2002) is an Afghan cricketer, who has played for the national cricket team. He made his first-class debut on 25 February 2019, for Kunduz Province in the 2018–19 Mirwais Nika Provincial 3-Day. He made his List A debut on 10 September 2019, for Amo Region in the 2019 Ghazi Amanullah Khan Regional One Day Tournament. He made his Twenty20 debut on 7 September 2020, for Boost Defenders in the 2020 Shpageeza Cricket League.

== International career ==
In February 2021, he was named in Afghanistan's Test squad for their series against Zimbabwe. In July 2021, he was named as one of four reserve players in Afghanistan's One Day International (ODI) squad for their series against Pakistan. In January 2022, he was named in Afghanistan's ODI squad for their series against the Netherlands in Qatar. The following month, he was named as one of two travelling reserves in Afghanistan's squad for their series against Bangladesh.

He made his ODI debut against Bangladesh, on 5 July 2023. During a Test match against India in June 2026, he took his maiden five-wicket haul.
