= Afghan cricket team in the United Arab Emirates in 2023–24 =

International cricket tour

Afghan cricket team in the UAE in 2023–24
	United Arab Emirates	Afghanistan
- Dates: 25 December – 2 January 2024
Captains	Muhammad Waseem	Ibrahim Zadran

Twenty20 International series
- Results: Afghanistan won the 3-match series 2–1
Most runs	Muhammad Waseem (84)	Rahmanullah Gurbaz (141)
Most wickets	Muhammad Jawadullah (6)	Qais Ahmad (6)

The Afghanistan men's cricket team toured the United Arab Emirates (UAE) in December 2023 and January 2024 to play three Twenty20 International (T20I) and two 50-over matches. This was Afghanistan second tour of the UAE this year, with Afghanistan winning the T20I series 2–1 in February 2023. The T20I series formed part of Afghanistan's preparation for the 2024 ICC Men's T20 World Cup tournament. The dates for the tour were confirmed in December 2023.

== Squads ==
United Arab Emirates		Afghanistan	
50-overs	T20Is	50-overs	T20Is
Muhammad Waseem (c); Ayman Ahamed; Mayank Chowdary; Rahul Chopra; Muhammad Jawadullah; Aayan Afzal Khan; Nilansh Keswani; Sagar Kalyan; Dhruv Parashar; Omid Rahman; Akif Raja; Tanish Suri (wk); Samal Udawaththa; Muhammad Zuhaib	Muhammad Waseem (c); Vriitya Aravind (wk); Basil Hameed; Muhammad Jawadullah; Aayan Afzal Khan; Nilansh Keswani; Aryan Lakra; Ali Naseer; Dhruv Parashar; Omid Rahman; Akif Raja; Khalid Shah (wk); Tanish Suri (wk); Junaid Siddique; Samal Udawaththa	Hashmatullah Shahidi (c); Fareed Ahmad; Ikram Alikhil (wk); Sharafuddin Ashraf; Qais Ahmad; Yamin Ahmadzai; Mohammad Ishaq (wk); Riaz Hassan; Gulbadin Naib; Azmatullah Omarzai; Abdul Rahman; Zia-ur-Rehman; Darwish Rasooli; Bahir Shah; Bilal Sami; Rahmat Shah; Ibrahim Zadran	Ibrahim Zadran (c); Fareed Ahmad; Noor Ahmad; Sediqullah Atal; Sharafuddin Ashraf; Qais Ahmad; Fazalhaq Farooqi; Rahmanullah Gurbaz (wk); Naveen-ul-Haq; Mohammad Ishaq (wk); Karim Janat; Mohammad Nabi; Azmatullah Omarzai; Darwish Rasooli; Mohammad Saleem; Rahmat Shah; Hazratullah Zazai; Najibullah Zadran

Ijaz Ahmad Ahmadzai, Ikram Alikhil, Rashid Khan and Gulbadin Naib were included in the Afghanistan T20I squad as reserves.

== 50-over series ==
=== 1st 50-over match ===
25 December 2023
09:30
Scorecard

Afghanistan; 214 (47.2 overs)	v	United Arab Emirates Falcons; 105 (30.4 overs)
Bahir Shah 44 (64); Akif Raja 3/40 (6.2 overs)		Dhruv Parashar 38* (61); Yamin Ahmadzai 5/22 (6.4 overs)

Afghanistan won by 109 runs
Sharjah Cricket Stadium, Sharjah
Umpires: Akbar Ali (UAE) and Aasif Iqbal (UAE)

- United Arab Emirates Falcons won the toss and elected to field.

=== 2nd 50-over match ===
27 December 2023
09:30
Scorecard

Afghanistan; 249/7 (50 overs)	v	United Arab Emirates Falcons; 154 (42.2 overs)
Sharafuddin Ashraf 63* (41); Aayan Afzal Khan 3/15 (8 overs)		Rahul Chopra 40 (71); Fareed Ahmad 3/17 (5 overs)

Afghanistan won by 95 runs
Sharjah Cricket Stadium, Sharjah
Umpires: Akbar Ali (UAE) and Shiju Sam (UAE)

- Afghanistan won the toss and elected to bat.

== T20I series ==
=== 1st T20I ===
29 December 2023
18:00 (D/N)
Scorecard

Afghanistan; 203/3 (20 overs)	v	United Arab Emirates; 131/4 (20 overs)
Rahmanullah Gurbaz 100 (52); Aayan Afzal Khan 1/26 (4 overs)		Vriitya Aravind 70* (64); Fazalhaq Farooqi 2/19 (4 overs)

Afghanistan won by 72 runs
Sharjah Cricket Stadium, Sharjah
Umpires: Aasif Iqbal (UAE) and Shiju Sam (UAE)
Player of the match: Rahmanullah Gurbaz (Afg)

- United Arab Emirates won the toss and elected to field.
- Tanish Suri and Samal Udawaththa (UAE) both made their T20I debuts.
- Rahmanullah Gurbaz (Afg) scored his first century in T20Is.

=== 2nd T20I ===
31 December 2023
18:00 (D/N)
Scorecard

United Arab Emirates; 166/7 (20 overs)	v	Afghanistan; 155 (19.5 overs)
Aryan Lakra 63 (47); Qais Ahmad 2/15 (3 overs)		Mohammad Nabi 47 (27); Ali Naseer 4/24 (4 overs)

United Arab Emirates won by 11 runs
Sharjah Cricket Stadium, Sharjah
Umpires: Akbar Ali (UAE) and Shiju Sam (UAE)
Player of the match: Ali Naseer (UAE)

- United Arab Emirates won the toss and elected to bat.
- Dhruv Parashar (UAE) made his T20I debut.

=== 3rd T20I ===
2 January 2024
18:00 (D/N)
Scorecard

United Arab Emirates; 126/9 (20 overs)	v	Afghanistan; 128/6 (18.3 overs)
Muhammad Waseem 27 (25); Naveen-ul-Haq 4/20 (4 overs)		Hazratullah Zazai 36 (32); Junaid Siddique 2/32 (3.3 overs)

Afghanistan won by 4 wickets
Sharjah Cricket Stadium, Sharjah
Umpires: Akbar Ali (UAE) and Aasif Iqbal (UAE)
Player of the match: Naveen-ul-Haq (Afg)

- United Arab Emirates won the toss and elected to bat.
