= New Zealand cricket team in the United Arab Emirates in 2023 =

International cricket tour

New Zealand men's cricket team in the UAE in 2023
	United Arab Emirates	New Zealand
- Dates: 17 – 20 August 2023
Captains	Muhammad Waseem	Tim Southee

Twenty20 International series
- Results: New Zealand won the 3-match series 2–1
Most runs	Aryansh Sharma (76)	Mark Chapman (129)
Most wickets	Junaid Siddique (5)	Tim Southee (6)
- Player of the series: Mark Chapman (NZ)

The New Zealand men's cricket team toured the United Arab Emirates in August 2023 to play three Twenty20 International (T20I) matches. Emirates Cricket Board (ECB) announced the fixtures for the tour in March 2023. The only previous time that New Zealand played against UAE was in a One Day International (ODI) match at the 1996 World Cup.

New Zealand won the first T20I by 19 runs, after which United Arab Emirates beat New Zealand in the second T20I. It was United Arab Emirates' first international win over New Zealand and also New Zealand's first defeat against an associate team. New Zealand won the last match of the series to take the series 2–1.

== Squads ==
United Arab Emirates	New Zealand
Muhammad Waseem (c); Ali Naseer; Ansh Tandon; Aryansh Sharma (wk); Asif Khan; Aayan Afzal Khan; Basil Hameed; Ethan D'Souza; Mohammed Faraazuddin; Jash Giyanani; Junaid Siddique; Lovepreet Singh; Muhammad Jawadullah; Sanchit Sharma; Vriitya Aravind (wk); Zahoor Khan	Tim Southee (c); Adithya Ashok; Chad Bowes; Mark Chapman; Dane Cleaver (wk); Jacob Duffy; ~~Lockie Ferguson~~; Dean Foxcroft; Kyle Jamieson; Cole McConchie; Jimmy Neesham; Ben Lister; Rachin Ravindra; Mitchell Santner; Tim Seifert (wk); ~~Henry Shipley~~; ~~Blair Tickner~~; Will Young

Blair Tickner and Ben Lister were added to New Zealand's squad after the withdrawal of Henry Shipley and Lockie Ferguson due to injury and other commitments, respectively. On 14 August 2023, Blair Tickner opted to skip the series due to family reasons and was replaced by Jacob Duffy.

== T20I series ==
=== 1st T20I ===
17 August 2023
18:00 (N)
Scorecard

New Zealand; 155/6 (20 overs)	v	United Arab Emirates; 136 (19.4 overs)
Tim Seifert 55 (34); Basil Hameed 2/30 (4 overs)		Aryansh Sharma 60 (43); Tim Southee 5/25 (4 overs)

New Zealand won by 19 runs
Dubai International Cricket Stadium, Dubai
Umpires: Aasif Iqbal (UAE) and Akbar Ali (UAE)
Player of the match: Tim Southee (NZ)

- United Arab Emirates won the toss and elected to field.
- Mohammed Faraazuddin, Asif Khan, Ali Naseer and Aryansh Sharma (UAE) all made their T20I debuts.

=== 2nd T20I ===
19 August 2023
18:00 (N)
Scorecard

New Zealand; 142/8 (20 overs)	v	United Arab Emirates; 144/3 (15.4 overs)
Mark Chapman 63 (46); Aayan Afzal Khan 3/20 (4 overs)		Muhammad Waseem 55 (29); Mitchell Santner 1/26 (3 overs)

United Arab Emirates won by 7 wickets
Dubai International Cricket Stadium, Dubai
Umpires: Aasif Iqbal (UAE) and Shiju Sam (UAE)
Player of the match: Aayan Afzal Khan (UAE)

- United Arab Emirates won the toss and elected to field.
- This was United Arab Emirates's maiden victory against New Zealand in any format of cricket.

=== 3rd T20I ===
20 August 2023
18:00 (N)
Scorecard

New Zealand; 166/5 (20 overs)	v	United Arab Emirates; 134/7 (20 overs)
Will Young 56 (46); Junaid Siddique 3/26 (4 overs)		Aayan Afzal Khan 42 (36); Ben Lister 3/35 (4 overs)

New Zealand won by 32 runs
Dubai International Cricket Stadium, Dubai
Umpires: Akbar Ali (UAE) and Shiju Sam (UAE)
Player of the match: Will Young (NZ)

- United Arab Emirates won the toss and elected to field.
- Adithya Ashok and Dean Foxcroft (NZ) both made their T20I debuts.
