= 2023 United Arab Emirates Tri-Nation Series =

Cricket tournament

- Part of 2019–2023 ICC Cricket World Cup League 2
- Date: 27 February – 6 March 2023
- Location: United Arab Emirates
Teams
Nepal	Papua New Guinea	United Arab Emirates
Captains
Rohit Paudel	Assad Vala	Chundangapoyil Rizwan (Note: Muhammad Waseem captained United Arab Emirates in the final match of the series.)
Most runs
Aasif Sheikh (153)	Sese Bau (134)	Asif Khan (185)
Most wickets
Sandeep Lamichhane (7)	Chad Soper (8)	Karthik Meiyappan (8); Rohan Mustafa (8)

The 2023 United Arab Emirates Tri-Nation Series was the 20th round of the 2019–2023 ICC Cricket World Cup League 2 cricket tournament, which took place in the United Arab Emirates in February and March 2023. It was a tri-nation series between United Arab Emirates, Nepal and Papua New Guinea with the matches played in the One Day International (ODI) format. The World Cup League 2 tournament forms part of the qualification process for the 2023 Cricket World Cup.

Nepal's 42-run win against the UAE in the final match of the series kept them in contention for the third and final automatic place in the 2023 Cricket World Cup Qualifier, and confirmed that the UAE would have to earn a place via the World Cup Qualifier Play-off.

== Squads ==
Nepal	Papua New Guinea	United Arab Emirates
Rohit Paudel (c); Dipendra Singh Airee; Kushal Bhurtel; ~~Mousom Dhakal~~; Pratis GC; Gulsan Jha; Sundeep Jora; Sompal Kami; Karan KC; Sandeep Lamichhane; Gyanendra Malla; Kushal Malla; Lalit Rajbanshi; Bhim Sharki; Aarif Sheikh; Aasif Sheikh (wk)	Assad Vala (c); Charles Amini; Sese Bau; Kiplin Doriga (wk); Riley Hekure; Hiri Hiri; Semo Kamea; John Kariko; Kabua Morea; Alei Nao; Chad Soper; Gaudi Toka; Tony Ura; Norman Vanua; Hila Vare (wk)	Chundangapoyil Rizwan (c); Sabir Ali; Vriitya Aravind (wk); Rahul Bhatia; Hazrat Bilal; Aayan Afzal Khan; Asif Khan; Zahoor Khan; Aryan Lakra; Karthik Meiyappan; Rohan Mustafa; Alishan Sharafu; Junaid Siddique; Muhammad Waseem

On 1 March 2023, Nepal's Mousom Dhakal was ruled out of series due to a shoulder injury, with Sandeep Lamichhane named as his replacement. On 5 March 2023, Nepal's Kushal Bhurtel was ruled out of series due to an injury.

== Fixtures ==
=== 1st ODI ===
27 February 2023
10:00
Scorecard

Papua New Guinea; 203/9 (50 overs)	v	Nepal; 207/6 (45.2 overs)
Chad Soper 36* (53); Gulsan Jha 3/28 (9 overs)		Kushal Bhurtel 56 (69); Assad Vala 3/37 (10 overs)

Nepal won by 4 wickets
Dubai International Cricket Stadium, Dubai
Umpires: Akbar Ali (UAE) and Lyndon Hannibal (SL)
Player of the match: Kushal Bhurtel (Nep)

- Nepal won the toss and elected to field.
- Pratis GC (Nep) made his ODI debut.

=== 2nd ODI ===
28 February 2023
10:00
Scorecard

Papua New Guinea; 262 (49.1 overs)	v	United Arab Emirates; 131 (34.2 overs)
Sese Bau 74 (76); Karthik Meiyappan 4/49 (10 overs)		Muhammad Waseem 24 (17); Chad Soper 5/25 (10 overs)

Papua New Guinea won by 131 runs
Dubai International Cricket Stadium, Dubai
Umpires: Lyndon Hannibal (SL) and Bismillah Jan Shinwari (Afg)
Player of the match: Chad Soper (PNG)

- United Arab Emirates won the toss and elected to field.
- Hila Vare (PNG) made his ODI debut.

=== 3rd ODI ===
2 March 2023
10:00
Scorecard

United Arab Emirates; 207/8 (50 overs)	v	Nepal; 139 (31.5 overs)
Asif Khan 72 (99); Sandeep Lamichhane 3/27 (10 overs)		Kushal Malla 60 (53); Karthik Meiyappan 3/26 (8.5 overs)

United Arab Emirates won by 68 runs
Dubai International Cricket Stadium, Dubai
Umpires: Akbar Ali (UAE) and Bismillah Jan Shinwari (Afg)
Player of the match: Rohan Mustafa (UAE)

- Nepal won the toss and elected to field.

=== 4th ODI ===
3 March 2023
10:00
Scorecard

Papua New Guinea; 179 (49.2 overs)	v	Nepal; 182/7 (48 overs)
Tony Ura 39 (51); Dipendra Singh Airee 2/30 (10 overs)		Aasif Sheikh 86* (130); Assad Vala 3/21 (10 overs)

Nepal won by 3 wickets
Dubai International Cricket Stadium, Dubai
Umpires: Akbar Ali (UAE) and Lyndon Hannibal (SL)
Player of the match: Aasif Sheikh (Nep)

- Papua New Guinea won the toss and elected to bat.

=== 5th ODI ===
5 March 2023
10:00
Scorecard

United Arab Emirates; 97 (26.2 overs)	v	Papua New Guinea; 98/5 (26.5 overs)
Vriitya Aravind 26 (32); Riley Hekure 5/13 (4.2 overs)		Tony Ura 35* (63); Rohan Mustafa 2/16 (5 overs)

Papua New Guinea won by 5 wickets
Dubai International Cricket Stadium, Dubai
Umpires: Lyndon Hannibal (SL) and Bismillah Jan Shinwari (Afg)
Player of the match: Riley Hekure (PNG)

- Papua New Guinea won the toss and elected to field.
- Riley Hekure (PNG) took his first five-wicket haul in ODIs.

=== 6th ODI ===
6 March 2023
10:00
Scorecard

Nepal; 229/8 (50 overs)	v	United Arab Emirates; 187 (45 overs)
Bhim Sharki 70 (99); Junaid Siddique 3/53 (10 overs)		Asif Khan 82 (115); Dipendra Singh Airee 3/18 (8 overs)

Nepal won by 42 runs
Dubai International Cricket Stadium, Dubai
Umpires: Akbar Ali (UAE) and Bismillah Jan Shinwari (Afg)
Player of the match: Bhim Sharki (Nep)

- Nepal won the toss and elected to bat.
