= West Indian cricket team in the United Arab Emirates in 2023 =

International cricket tour

West Indian cricket team in the UAE in 2023
	United Arab Emirates	West Indies
- Dates: 4 – 9 June 2023
Captains	Muhammad Waseem	Shai Hope (Note: Roston Chase captained West Indies in the 3rd ODI.)

One Day International series
- Results: West Indies won the 3-match series 3–0
Most runs	Vriitya Aravind (146)	Brandon King (176)
Most wickets	Aayan Afzal Khan (5)	Yannic Cariah (5)
- Player of the series: Brandon King (WI)

The West Indies cricket team toured the United Arab Emirates in June 2023 to play three One Day International (ODI) matches. The series provided both sides with preparation ahead of the 2023 Cricket World Cup Qualifier. In May 2023, the Emirates Cricket Board (ECB) had confirmed the fixtures.

West Indies won the series 3–0.

== Squads ==
United Arab Emirates	West Indies
Muhammad Waseem (c); Vriitya Aravind (wk); Basil Hameed; Ethan D'Souza; Mohammed Faraazuddin; Jonathan Figy; Muhammad Jawadullah; Aayan Afzal Khan; Asif Khan; Matiullah Khan; Zahoor Khan; Karthik Meiyappan; Rohan Mustafa; Ali Naseer; Fahad Nawaz; Rameez Shahzad; Junaid Siddique; Lovepreet Singh; Aryansh Sharma (wk); Sanchit Sharma; Adhitya Shetty; Ansh Tandon	Shai Hope (c, wk); Brandon King (vc); Alick Athanaze; Shamarh Brooks; Yannic Cariah; Keacy Carty; Johnson Charles (wk); Roston Chase; Dominic Drakes; Kavem Hodge; Akeem Jordan; ~~Gudakesh Motie~~; Keemo Paul; Raymon Reifer; Kevin Sinclair; Odean Smith; ~~Devon Thomas (wk)~~

Gudakesh Motie and Devon Thomas were replaced in West Indies' squad by Kevin Sinclair and Johnson Charles respectively before the start of the series.

== ODI series ==
=== 1st ODI ===
4 June 2023
16:30 (D/N)
Scorecard

United Arab Emirates; 202 (47.1 overs)	v	West Indies; 206/3 (35.2 overs)
Ali Naseer 58 (52); Keemo Paul 3/34 (7.1 overs)		Brandon King 112 (112); Rohan Mustafa 1/22 (6 overs)

West Indies won by 7 wickets
Sharjah Cricket Stadium, Sharjah
Umpires: Aasif Iqbal (UAE) and Ahsan Raza (Pak)
Player of the match: Brandon King (WI)

- United Arab Emirates won the toss and elected to bat.
- Ali Naseer (UAE), Dominic Drakes and Kavem Hodge (WI) all made their ODI debuts.
- Brandon King (WI) scored his first century in ODIs.

=== 2nd ODI ===
6 June 2023
16:30 (D/N)
Scorecard

West Indies; 306 (49.5 overs)	v	United Arab Emirates; 228/7 (50 overs)
Brandon King 64 (70); Zahoor Khan 3/44 (9.5 overs)		Ali Naseer 57 (53); Kavem Hodge 2/46 (8 overs)

West Indies won by 78 runs
Sharjah Cricket Stadium, Sharjah
Umpires: Ahsan Raza (Pak) and Shiju Sam (UAE)
Player of the match: Johnson Charles (WI)

- West Indies won the toss and elected to bat.
- Lovepreet Singh, Adhitya Shetty (UAE) and Akeem Jordan (WI) all made their ODI debuts.

=== 3rd ODI ===
9 June 2023
16:30 (D/N)
Scorecard

United Arab Emirates; 184 (36.1 overs)	v	West Indies; 185/6 (35.1 overs)
Vriitya Aravind 70 (75); Kevin Sinclair 4/24 (7.1 overs)		Alick Athanaze 65 (45); Muhammad Jawadullah 2/36 (5.1 overs)

West Indies won by 4 wickets
Sharjah Cricket Stadium, Sharjah
Umpires: Akbar Ali (UAE) and Ahsan Raza (Pak)
Player of the match: Kevin Sinclair (WI)

- United Arab Emirates won the toss and elected to bat.
- Ethan D'Souza, Muhammad Jawadullah (UAE) and Alick Athanaze (WI) all made their ODI debuts.
