= Lovepreet Singh =

Lovepreet Singh may refer to:

- Lovepreet Singh (cricketer)
- Lovepreet Singh (footballer)
- Lovepreet Singh (weightlifter)
