= List of leading T20I run-scorers in each calendar year =

A Twenty20 International is an international cricket match between two representative teams. A Twenty20 International is played under the rules of Twenty20 cricket. First men's Twenty20 International was contested between Australia and New Zealand on 17 February 2005 at Eden Park, Auckland which was won by Australia by 44 runs. In 2005 only 2 T20I matches took place followed by 3 matches in 2006. The number of matches grew in 2007 because of the inaugural T20 World Cup.

In April 2018, the ICC decided to grant full Twenty20 International (T20I) status to all its members. Therefore, all Twenty20 matches played between any ICC members after 1 January 2019 will have T20I status. Hence the number of matches for every calendar year increased a lot.

The following is a list of players who have scored most runs in each of the calendar years starting from 2005, till date. The matches played between 1 January and 31 December (both dates inclusive) of each year, are considered to be part of every calendar year. Till date, Austria's Karanveer Singh has scored most runs in a calendar year when he finished 2025 with total runs of 1488 from 32 innings.

== Key ==
- Mat. – Number of matches played
- Inn. – Number of innings batted
- HS – Highest score
- Avg – Runs scored per dismissal
- S/R – Strike rate (runs scored per 100 balls)
- 100 – Centuries scored
- 50 – Half-centuries scored
- Ref. & Scorecard – Scorecard of the match in which player reached 1,000 runs

== Most T20I runs in each calendar year ==
Player list and statistics are updated as of 31 December 2025.

Leading T20I run-scorer in each calendar year
Year	Player	Country	Mat.	Inn.	Runs	HS	Avg.	S/R	100	50	Ref
2005	Ricky Ponting	Australia	2	2	98	98*	98.00	168.96	0	1	
2006	Graeme Smith	South Africa	3	3	127	89*	63.50	120.95	0	1	
2007	Mathew Hayden	Australia	8	8	302	73*	60.40	143.80	0	4	
2008	Hamilton Masakadza	Zimbabwe	4	4	169	79	42.25	146.95	0	2	
2009	Tillakaratne Dilshan	Sri Lanka	12	12	471	96*	42.81	141.44	0	5	
2010	Umar Akmal	Pakistan	18	17	441	64	29.40	123.18	0	3	
2011	Shane Watson	Australia	5	5	195	59	39.00	172.56	0	3	
2012	Martin Guptill	New Zealand	12	12	472	101*	47.20	130.74	1	2	
2013	Ahmed Shehzad	Pakistan	12	12	347	98*	31.54	121.32	0	2	
2014	Alex Hales	England	12	12	397	116*	36.09	142.80	1	1	
2015	Mohammad Shahzad	Afghanistan	11	11	297	75	27.00	156.31	0	3	
2016	Virat Kohli	India	15	13	641	90*	106.83	140.26	0	7	
2017	Evin Lewis	West Indies	9	9	357	125*	44.62	154.54	1	2	
2018	Shikhar Dhawan	India	18	17	689	92	40.52	147.22	0	6	
2019	Paul Stirling	Ireland	20	20	748	91	41.55	140.60	0	8	
2020	Mohammad Hafeez	Pakistan	10	8	415	99*	83.00	152.57	0	4	
2021	Mohammad Rizwan	Pakistan	29	26	1326	104*	73.66	134.89	1	12	
2022	Suryakumar Yadav	India	31	31	1164	117	46.56	187.43	2	9	
2023	Muhammad Waseem	United Arab Emirates	23	23	863	91	39.22	162.52	0	7	
2024	Muhammad Waseem	United Arab Emirates	26	26	909	100	39.52	160.03	1	8	
2025	Karanbeer Singh	Austria	32	32	1488	115	51.31	174.85	2	13	

== See also ==
- List of Twenty20 International cricket records
