= 2022 Men's T20 World Cup =

Eighth edition of the ICC Men's T20 World Cup

2022 ICC Men's T20 World Cup
- Dates: 16 October – 13 November 2022
- Administrator: International Cricket Council
- Cricket format: Twenty20 International
- Tournament format(s): Group stage and knockout
- Host: Australia
- Champions: England (2nd title)
- Runners-up: Pakistan
- Participants: 16
- Matches: 45
- Attendance: 751,597 (16,702 per match)
- Player of the series: (England) Sam Curran
- Most runs: (India) Virat Kohli (296)
- Most wickets: (Sri Lanka) Wanindu Hasaranga (15)
- Official website: t20worldcup.com

The 2022 ICC Men's T20 World Cup was the eighth edition of the Men's T20 World Cup, formerly known as the ICC World Twenty20. It was played in Australia from 16 October to 13 November 2022. In the final, England beat Pakistan by five wickets to win their second ICC Men's T20 World Cup title and draw level with the West Indies, who also won 2 ICC Men's T20 World Cup titles in both the 2012 and the 2016 editions. In winning the tournament, England also became the first team to simultaneously be the existing winners of the Cricket World Cup and the T20 World Cup. Sam Curran was named the player of the match and also the player of the tournament. It was the last edition to feature 16 team format, before it was expanded to 20 teams in the next edition.

Although originally scheduled to be held in 2020, the International Cricket Council (ICC) postponed the tournament because of the COVID-19 pandemic, with the re-arranged tournament held in Australia in 2022. The host nation were also the defending champions.

The host cities for matches were Adelaide, Brisbane, Geelong, Hobart, Melbourne, Perth, and Sydney. The semi-finals took place at the Sydney Cricket Ground and at the Adelaide Oval.

A series of global qualifying matches took place for the right to play in the group stage of the tournament, with the two best-placed teams from the groups entering the Super 12 stage to compete alongside the eight pre-qualified nations.

== Background ==
In April 2018, the ICC announced that the tournament would replace the scheduled 2021 ICC Champions Trophy. This was after the ICC granted full international status to Twenty20 matches played between member sides from 1 January 2019 onwards.

In October 2019, it was reported that the ICC could scrap the T20 World Cup Qualifier, which would have been used as a pathway for qualification to the T20 World Cup. Therefore, 12 teams from the 2021 Men's T20 World Cup and four teams from qualification events would advance to the T20 World Cup. On 23 January 2020, the ICC confirmed the full details of qualification for the tournament. In May 2020, the ICC told the Board of Control for Cricket in India (BCCI) that they reserved the right to take away hosting rights from India, after the BCCI did not secure a tax exemption from the Indian government for the tournament.

In July 2020, when the previous edition of the tournament was being reviewed due to the COVID-19 pandemic, Earl Eddings, the chairman of Cricket Australia suggested that Australia could host that tournament in October 2021, and India stage this tournament a year later in 2022. The ICC also confirmed that either Australia or India, the hosts for the tournaments originally scheduled to take place in 2020 and 2021 respectively, would host this tournament.

Several warm-up matches were played between 10 and 19 October 2022 between all participants. The first set of matches featured the teams from the groups in the first round of the main tournament, before the teams in the Super 12 phase played their warm-up matches. These matches did not have either T20I or T20 status as teams were allowed to field all 15 members of their squad.

== Teams and qualifications ==
The twelve teams that reached the Super 12 phase of the 2021 ICC Men's T20 World Cup automatically qualified for the 2022 tournament. Afghanistan, Australia, Bangladesh, England, India, Pakistan, New Zealand and South Africa all qualified directly for the Super 12 phase of this tournament, based on their performances in the 2021 tournament and their rankings as of 15 November 2021. Namibia, Scotland, Sri Lanka and the West Indies were all placed in the group stage of the competition.

The remaining four places came from the top two teams from each of the two Global Qualifiers. The Global Qualifiers had a total of sixteen teams; the bottom four teams from the 2021 ICC Men's T20 World Cup (Ireland, Netherlands, Oman and Papua New Guinea), the next four highest ranked T20I sides (Zimbabwe, Nepal, the United Arab Emirates and Singapore), and the eight teams that progressed from the Regional Finals. From the Global Qualifier A tournament, Ireland and the United Arab Emirates progressed to the T20 World Cup. The United Arab Emirates won the Global Qualifier A to be placed in Group A of the T20 World Cup, with Ireland placed in Group B. From the Global Qualifier B tournament, the Netherlands and Zimbabwe became the final two teams to qualify for the T20 World Cup. Zimbabwe won the Global Qualifier B tournament to be placed in Group B of the T20 World Cup, with the Netherlands being placed in Group A.

Means of qualification	Date	Venue	Berths	Qualified
Host nation	—N/a		1	Australia
2021 ICC Men's T20 World Cup (Top 11 teams from the previous tournament, excluding the hosts)	14 November 2021	(United Arab Emirates) UAE; Oman	11	Afghanistan; Bangladesh; England; India; Namibia; New Zealand; Pakistan; Scotland; South Africa; Sri Lanka; West Indies
Global Qualifier A	18–24 February 2022	Oman	2	Ireland; United Arab Emirates
Global Qualifier B	11–17 July 2022	Zimbabwe	2	Netherlands; Zimbabwe
Total			16	

=== Global Qualifiers ===
The Global Qualifiers comprised the four lowest-ranked teams from the 2021 ICC T20 World Cup, the four best-ranked teams not already qualified for the World Cup or qualifiers; and eight teams from Regional Qualifiers. On 24 March 2020, the International Cricket Council (ICC) confirmed that all ICC qualifying events scheduled to take place before 30 June 2020 had been postponed due to the COVID-19 pandemic. In December 2020, the ICC updated the qualification pathway following the disruption from the pandemic.

In August 2021, the ICC confirmed that the EAP qualifier had been cancelled due to the COVID-19 pandemic. As a result, the Philippines advanced to the Global Qualifiers as the highest-ranked team in the EAP region. In October 2021, Group B of the Asia qualifier was also cancelled due to the pandemic, with Hong Kong progressing as the highest-ranked team. In the Regional Final of the European qualifier, Jersey won their first four matches to confirm their progression to the Global Qualifiers. Germany finished in second place, ahead of Italy on net run rate, to also advance from the European group. Bahrain won Group A of the Asia qualifier, finishing just ahead of Qatar on net run rate. In the Americas qualifier, the United States became the first team from that group to reach the Global Qualifiers, after they won their first five matches. They were joined by Canada, who finished in second position in the Americas qualifier group. Uganda claimed the final place in the Global Qualifiers, after winning the Regional Final of the Africa qualifier.

Means of qualification	Date	Venue	Berths	Qualified
2021 ICC Men's T20 World Cup (Lowest four teams from the previous tournament)	November 2021	United Arab Emirates; Oman	4	Ireland; Netherlands; Oman; Papua New Guinea
ICC T20I Championship (Highest ranked teams not already qualified)			4	Nepal; United Arab Emirates; Singapore; Zimbabwe
Regional qualifications
Africa	17–20 November 2021	Rwanda	1	Uganda
Americas	7–14 November 2021	Antigua and Barbuda	2	Canada; United States
Asia	23–29 October 2021	Qatar	1	Bahrain
Asia	Cancelled	Malaysia	1	Hong Kong
East Asia-Pacific	Cancelled	Japan	1	Philippines
Europe	15–21 October 2021	Spain	2	Germany; Jersey
Total			16	

== Match officials ==
On 3 October 2022, the ICC named the match referees and the umpires for the group stage of the tournament. On 7 November 2022, the ICC confirmed the match referees and the umpires for the semi-finals, with the officials for the final being named after the semi-finals.

Match referees

- (Australia) David Boon
- (England) Chris Broad
- (Sri Lanka) Ranjan Madugalle
- (Zimbabwe) Andy Pycroft

Umpires

- (New Zealand) Chris Brown
- (Pakistan) Aleem Dar
- (Sri Lanka) Kumar Dharmasena
- (South Africa) Marais Erasmus
- (New Zealand) Chris Gaffaney
- (England) Michael Gough
- (South Africa) Adrian Holdstock
- (England) Richard Illingworth
- (England) Richard Kettleborough
- (India) Nitin Menon
- (Pakistan) Ahsan Raza
- (Australia) Paul Reiffel
- (Zimbabwe) Langton Rusere
- (Australia) Rod Tucker
- (Cricket West Indies) Joel Wilson
- (Australia) Paul Wilson

== Squads ==
On 1 September 2022, Australia were the first team to announce their squad for the tournament. All the teams announced their preliminary squads by 22 September 2022.

== Venues ==
On 15 November 2021, the ICC confirmed the venues that would host matches across the tournament. The host cities were Adelaide, Brisbane, Geelong, Hobart, Melbourne, Perth and Sydney. The semi-finals took place at the Sydney Cricket Ground and the Adelaide Oval, with the final taking place at the Melbourne Cricket Ground.

Adelaide	Brisbane	Geelong
Adelaide Oval	The Gabba	Kardinia Park
Capacity: 50,000	Capacity: 37,000	Capacity: 26,000 (Note: The stadium was undergoing construction at the time, which reduced its capacity to 26,000.)
Hobart	2022 Men's T20 World Cup is located in Australia	
Bellerive Oval	2022 Men's T20 World Cup is located in Australia	
Capacity: 15,000	2022 Men's T20 World Cup is located in Australia	
Perth	Melbourne	Sydney
Perth Stadium	Melbourne Cricket Ground	Sydney Cricket Ground
Capacity: 61,266	Capacity: 100,024	Capacity: 44,002

== Prize money ==
On 30 September 2022, the ICC announced the prize money for the tournament.

Stage	Prize money (US$)	Teams/matches	Total
Winners	$1.6 million	1	$1,600,000
Runners-up	$800,000	1	$800,000
Losing semi-finalists	$400,000 each	2	$800,000
Bonus for winning a "Super 12" match	$40,000 per match	30	$1,200,000
Teams get knocked out in the "Super 12" stage	$70,000 each	8	$560,000
Bonus for winning a "First round" match	$40,000 per match	12	$480,000
Teams get knocked out in the "First round"	$40,000 each	4	$160,000
Total			$5,600,000

== Warm-up matches ==
The following warm-up matches for the 2022 ICC Men's T20 World Cup were played between 10 and 19 October between all participants. The first set of matches featured the teams from the groups in the first round of the main tournament, before the teams in the Super 12 phase played their warm-up matches. These matches did not have either Twenty20 International (T20I) status or T20 status as teams were allowed to field all 15 members of their squad.

Matches

=== First round warm-ups ===
10 October 2022
12:00
Scorecard

West Indies; 152/9 (20 overs)	v	United Arab Emirates; 135/6 (20 overs)
Brandon King 64 (45); Junaid Siddique 5/13 (4 overs)		Muhammad Waseem 69* (52); Raymon Reifer 3/17 (4 overs)

West Indies won by 17 runs
Junction Oval, Melbourne
Umpires: Aleem Dar (Pak) and Marais Erasmus (SA)

- United Arab Emirates won the toss and elected to field.

10 October 2022
16:00 (D/N)
Scorecard

Scotland; 151/7 (20 overs)	v	Netherlands; 133/7 (20 overs)
Richie Berrington 41 (29); Brandon Glover 3/17 (4 overs)		Max O'Dowd 43 (35); Brad Wheal 2/24 (4 overs)

Scotland won by 18 runs
Junction Oval, Melbourne
Umpires: Chris Brown (NZ) and Richard Kettleborough (Eng)

- Scotland won the toss and elected to bat.

11 October 2022
14:30
Scorecard

Sri Lanka; 188/5 (20 overs)	v	Zimbabwe; 155/5 (20 overs)
Kusal Mendis 54 (29); Milton Shumba 1/7 (1 over)		Wesley Madhevere 43 (42); Chamika Karunaratne 2/26 (3 overs)

Sri Lanka won by 33 runs
Melbourne Cricket Ground, Melbourne
Umpires: Kumar Dharmasena (SL) and Paul Reiffel (Aus)

- Zimbabwe won the toss and elected to field.

11 October 2022
20:00 (N)
Scorecard

Namibia; 138/4 (20 overs)	v	Ireland; 127 (19.5 overs)
Gerhard Erasmus 34* (35); Gareth Delany 1/11 (2 overs)		Paul Stirling 37 (30); Ben Shikongo 3/11 (2 overs)

Namibia won by 11 runs
Melbourne Cricket Ground, Melbourne
Umpires: Richard Illingworth (Eng) and Joel Wilson (WI)

- Ireland won the toss and elected to field.

12 October 2022
20:00 (N)
Scorecard

Netherlands	v	West Indies

Match abandoned
Melbourne Cricket Ground, Melbourne
Umpires: Chris Brown (NZ) and Richard Kettleborough (Eng)

- No toss.
- No play was possible due to rain.

13 October 2022
12:00
Scorecard

Namibia	v	Zimbabwe

Match abandoned
Junction Oval, Melbourne
Umpires: Chris Brown (NZ) and Adrian Holdstock (SA)

- No toss.
- No play was possible due to rain.

13 October 2022
16:00 (D/N)
Scorecard

Ireland	v	Sri Lanka

Match abandoned
Junction Oval, Melbourne
Umpires: Aleem Dar (Pak) and Rod Tucker (Aus)

- No toss.
- No play was possible due to rain.

13 October 2022
20:00 (N)
Scorecard

Scotland	v	United Arab Emirates

Match abandoned
Melbourne Cricket Ground, Melbourne
Umpires: Kumar Dharmasena (SL) and Paul Wilson (Aus)

- No toss.
- No play was possible due to rain.

=== Super 12 warm-ups ===
17 October 2022
14:00
Scorecard

India; 186/7 (20 overs)	v	Australia; 180 (20 overs)
KL Rahul 57 (33); Kane Richardson 4/30 (4 overs)		Aaron Finch 76 (54); Mohammed Shami 3/4 (1 over)

India won by 6 runs
The Gabba, Brisbane
Umpires: Chris Gaffaney (NZ) and Adrian Holdstock (SA)

- Australia won the toss and elected to field.

17 October 2022
14:00
Scorecard

New Zealand; 98 (17.1 overs)	v	South Africa; 100/1 (11.2 overs)
Martin Guptill 26 (23); Keshav Maharaj 3/17 (3 overs)		Rilee Rossouw 54* (32); Ish Sodhi 1/16 (2.2 overs)

South Africa won by 9 wickets
Allan Border Field, Brisbane
Umpires: Nitin Menon (Ind) and Langton Rusere (Zim)

- South Africa won the toss and elected to field.

17 October 2022
18:00 (N)
Scorecard

Pakistan; 160/8 (19 overs)	v	England; 163/4 (14.4 overs)
Shan Masood 39 (22); David Willey 2/22 (2 overs)		Harry Brook 45* (24); Mohammad Wasim 2/16 (2.4 overs)

England won by 6 wickets (DLS method)
The Gabba, Brisbane
Umpires: Michael Gough (Eng) and Richard Illingworth (Eng)

- England won the toss and elected to field.
- The match was reduced to 19 overs per side due to rain.

17 October 2022
18:00 (N)
Scorecard

Afghanistan; 160/7 (20 overs)	v	Bangladesh; 98/9 (20 overs)
Ibrahim Zadran 46 (39); Taskin Ahmed 3/30 (4 overs)		Mosaddek Hossain 29 (33); Fazalhaq Farooqi 3/42 (4 overs)

Afghanistan won by 62 runs
Allan Border Field, Brisbane
Umpires: Ahsan Raza (Pak) and Langton Rusere (Zim)

- Afghanistan won the toss and elected to bat.

19 October 2022
13:00
Scorecard

Afghanistan; 154/6 (20 overs)	v	Pakistan; 19/0 (2.2 overs)
Mohammad Nabi 51* (37); Shaheen Afridi 2/29 (4 overs)		Babar Azam 6* (6)

No result
The Gabba, Brisbane
Umpires: Adrian Holdstock (SA) and Paul Reiffel (Aus)

- Pakistan won the toss and elected to field.
- No further play was possible due to rain.

19 October 2022
18:00 (N)
Scorecard

Bangladesh	v	South Africa

Match abandoned
Allan Border Field, Brisbane
Umpires: Nitin Menon (Ind) and Langton Rusere (Zim)

- No toss.
- No play was possible due to rain.

19 October 2022
18:00 (N)
Scorecard

India	v	New Zealand

Match abandoned
The Gabba, Brisbane
Umpires: Michael Gough (Eng) and Ahsan Raza (Pak)

- No toss.
- No play was possible due to rain.

== First round ==
On 21 March 2022, ICC confirmed the fixtures for the first round.

Qualification	First round	
Qualification	Group A	Group B
2021 ICC Men's T20 World Cup (9th to 12th placed teams from the previous tournament sorted by rankings)	Namibia	Scotland
2021 ICC Men's T20 World Cup (9th to 12th placed teams from the previous tournament sorted by rankings)	Sri Lanka	West Indies
Advanced from Global Qualifier (Top 4 teams)	Netherlands	Ireland
Advanced from Global Qualifier (Top 4 teams)	United Arab Emirates	Zimbabwe

=== Group A ===
Pos	Team	Pld	W	L	NR	Pts	NRR	Qualification
1	Sri Lanka	3	2	1	0	4	0.667	Advanced to Super 12
2	Netherlands	3	2	1	0	4	−0.162	Advanced to Super 12
3	Namibia	3	1	2	0	2	0.730	
4	United Arab Emirates	3	1	2	0	2	−1.235	

Source: ESPNcricinfo

16 October 2022
15:00
Scorecard

Namibia; 163/7 (20 overs)	v	Sri Lanka; 108 (19 overs)
Jan Frylinck 44 (28); Pramod Madushan 2/37 (4 overs)		Dasun Shanaka 29 (23); David Wiese 2/16 (4 overs)

Namibia won by 55 runs
Kardinia Park, Geelong
Attendance: 16,407
Umpires: Rod Tucker (Aus) and Joel Wilson (WI)
Player of the match: Jan Frylinck (Nam)

- Sri Lanka won the toss and elected to field.

16 October 2022
19:00 (N)
Scorecard

United Arab Emirates; 111/8 (20 overs)	v	Netherlands; 112/7 (19.5 overs)
Muhammad Waseem 41 (47); Bas de Leede 3/19 (3 overs)		Max O'Dowd 23 (18); Junaid Siddique 3/24 (4 overs)

Netherlands won by 3 wickets
Kardinia Park, Geelong
Attendance: 16,407
Umpires: Richard Kettleborough (Eng) and Paul Reiffel (Aus)
Player of the match: Bas de Leede (Ned)

- United Arab Emirates won the toss and elected to bat.

18 October 2022
15:00
Scorecard

Namibia; 121/6 (20 overs)	v	Netherlands; 122/5 (19.3 overs)
Jan Frylinck 43 (48); Bas de Leede 2/18 (3 overs)		Vikramjit Singh 39 (31); JJ Smit 2/24 (4 overs)

Netherlands won by 5 wickets
Kardinia Park, Geelong
Attendance: 4,545
Umpires: Richard Kettleborough (Eng) and Joel Wilson (WI)
Player of the match: Bas de Leede (Ned)

- Namibia won the toss and elected to bat.

18 October 2022
19:00 (N)
Scorecard

Sri Lanka; 152/8 (20 overs)	v	United Arab Emirates; 73 (17.1 overs)
Pathum Nissanka 74 (60); Karthik Meiyappan 3/19 (4 overs)		Aayan Afzal Khan 19 (21); Wanindu Hasaranga 3/8 (4 overs)

Sri Lanka won by 79 runs
Kardinia Park, Geelong
Attendance: 4,545
Umpires: Marais Erasmus (SA) and Rod Tucker (Aus)
Player of the match: Pathum Nissanka (SL)

- United Arab Emirates won the toss and elected to field.
- Karthik Meiyappan became the first bowler for the United Arab Emirates to take a hat-trick in T20Is.

20 October 2022
15:00
Scorecard

Sri Lanka; 162/6 (20 overs)	v	Netherlands; 146/9 (20 overs)
Kusal Mendis 79 (44); Paul van Meekeren 2/25 (4 overs)		Max O'Dowd 71* (53); Wanindu Hasaranga 3/28 (4 overs)

Sri Lanka won by 16 runs
Kardinia Park, Geelong
Attendance: 4,294
Umpires: Marais Erasmus (SA) and Joel Wilson (WI)
Player of the match: Kusal Mendis (SL)

- Sri Lanka won the toss and elected to bat.
- Sri Lanka qualified for the Super 12 as a result of this match, while the United Arab Emirates were eliminated.

20 October 2022
19:00 (N)
Scorecard

United Arab Emirates; 148/3 (20 overs)	v	Namibia; 141/8 (20 overs)
Muhammad Waseem 50 (41); Ben Shikongo 1/8 (1 over)		David Wiese 55 (36); Basil Hameed 2/17 (3 overs)

United Arab Emirates won by 7 runs
Kardinia Park, Geelong
Attendance: 4,294
Umpires: Richard Illingworth (Eng) and Richard Kettleborough (Eng)
Player of the match: Muhammad Waseem (UAE)

- United Arab Emirates won the toss and elected to bat.
- Fahad Nawaz (UAE) made his T20I debut.
- The Netherlands qualified for the Super 12 as a result of this match, while Namibia were eliminated.
- This was the United Arab Emirates' first-ever win at a T20 World Cup.

=== Group B ===
Pos	Team	Pld	W	L	NR	Pts	NRR	Qualification
1	Zimbabwe	3	2	1	0	4	0.200	Advanced to Super 12
2	Ireland	3	2	1	0	4	0.105	Advanced to Super 12
3	Scotland	3	1	2	0	2	0.304	
4	West Indies	3	1	2	0	2	−0.563	

Source: ESPNcricinfo

17 October 2022
15:00
Scorecard

Scotland; 160/5 (20 overs)	v	West Indies; 118 (18.3 overs)
George Munsey 66* (53); Jason Holder 2/14 (3 overs)		Jason Holder 38 (33); Mark Watt 3/12 (4 overs)

Scotland won by 42 runs
Bellerive Oval, Hobart
Attendance: 2,135
Umpires: Aleem Dar (Pak) and Paul Wilson (Aus)
Player of the match: George Munsey (Sco)

- West Indies won the toss and elected to field.

17 October 2022
19:00 (N)
Scorecard

Zimbabwe; 174/7 (20 overs)	v	Ireland; 143/9 (20 overs)
Sikandar Raza 82 (48); Josh Little 3/24 (4 overs)		Curtis Campher 27 (22); Blessing Muzarabani 3/23 (4 overs)

Zimbabwe won by 31 runs
Bellerive Oval, Hobart
Attendance: 2,135
Umpires: Chris Brown (NZ) and Kumar Dharmasena (SL)
Player of the match: Sikandar Raza (Zim)

- Ireland won the toss and elected to field.

19 October 2022
15:00
Scorecard

Scotland; 176/5 (20 overs)	v	Ireland; 180/4 (19 overs)
Michael Jones 86 (55); Curtis Campher 2/9 (2 overs)		Curtis Campher 72* (32); Michael Leask 1/16 (2 overs)

Ireland won by 6 wickets
Bellerive Oval, Hobart
Attendance: 2,940
Umpires: Chris Brown (NZ) and Kumar Dharmasena (SL)
Player of the match: Curtis Campher (Ire)

- Scotland won the toss and elected to bat.

19 October 2022
19:00 (N)
Scorecard

West Indies; 153/7 (20 overs)	v	Zimbabwe; 122 (18.2 overs)
Johnson Charles 45 (36); Sikandar Raza 3/19 (4 overs)		Luke Jongwe 29 (22); Alzarri Joseph 4/16 (4 overs)

West Indies won by 31 runs
Bellerive Oval, Hobart
Attendance: 2,940
Umpires: Aleem Dar (Pak) and Paul Wilson (Aus)
Player of the match: Alzarri Joseph (WI)

- West Indies won the toss and elected to bat.

21 October 2022
15:00
Scorecard

West Indies; 146/5 (20 overs)	v	Ireland; 150/1 (17.3 overs)
Brandon King 62* (48); Gareth Delany 3/16 (4 overs)		Paul Stirling 66* (48); Akeal Hosein 1/38 (4 overs)

Ireland won by 9 wickets
Bellerive Oval, Hobart
Attendance: 2,960
Umpires: Chris Gaffaney (NZ) and Ahsan Raza (Pak)
Player of the match: Gareth Delany (Ire)

- West Indies won the toss and elected to bat.
- Ireland qualified for the Super 12 as a result of this match, while West Indies were eliminated.

21 October 2022
19:00 (N)
Scorecard

Scotland; 132/6 (20 overs)	v	Zimbabwe; 133/5 (18.3 overs)
George Munsey 54 (51); Tendai Chatara 2/14 (4 overs)		Craig Ervine 58 (54); Josh Davey 2/16 (3 overs)

Zimbabwe won by 5 wickets
Bellerive Oval, Hobart
Attendance: 2,960
Umpires: Michael Gough (Eng) and Nitin Menon (Ind)
Player of the match: Sikandar Raza (Zim)

- Scotland won the toss and elected to bat.
- Zimbabwe qualified for the Super 12 as a result of this match, while Scotland were eliminated.

== Super 12 ==
Qualification	Super 12	
Qualification	Group 1	Group 2
2021 ICC Men's T20 World Cup (Top 8 teams from the previous tournament sorted by ICC rankings)	Afghanistan	Bangladesh
2021 ICC Men's T20 World Cup (Top 8 teams from the previous tournament sorted by ICC rankings)	Australia	India
2021 ICC Men's T20 World Cup (Top 8 teams from the previous tournament sorted by ICC rankings)	England	Pakistan
2021 ICC Men's T20 World Cup (Top 8 teams from the previous tournament sorted by ICC rankings)	New Zealand	South Africa
Advanced from First round (Top 4 teams)	Ireland	Netherlands
Advanced from First round (Top 4 teams)	Sri Lanka	Zimbabwe

=== Group 1 ===
Pos	Team	Pld	W	L	NR	Pts	NRR	Qualification
1	New Zealand	5	3	1	1	7	2.113	Advanced to knockout stage and 2024 Men's T20 World Cup
2	England	5	3	1	1	7	0.473	Advanced to knockout stage and 2024 Men's T20 World Cup
3	Australia	5	3	1	1	7	−0.173	Qualified for 2024 Men's T20 World Cup
4	Sri Lanka	5	2	3	0	4	−0.422	Qualified for 2024 Men's T20 World Cup
5	Ireland	5	1	3	1	3	−1.615	
6	Afghanistan	5	0	3	2	2	−0.571	

Source: ESPN Cricinfo

22 October 2022
18:00 (N)
Scorecard

New Zealand; 200/3 (20 overs)	v	Australia; 111 (17.1 overs)
Devon Conway 92* (58); Josh Hazlewood 2/41 (4 overs)		Glenn Maxwell 28 (20); Tim Southee 3/6 (2.1 overs)

New Zealand won by 89 runs
Sydney Cricket Ground, Sydney
Attendance: 34,756
Umpires: Kumar Dharmasena (SL) and Adrian Holdstock (SA)
Player of the match: Devon Conway (NZ)

- Australia won the toss and elected to field.

22 October 2022
19:00 (N)
Scorecard

Afghanistan; 112 (19.4 overs)	v	England; 113/5 (18.1 overs)
Ibrahim Zadran 32 (32); Sam Curran 5/10 (3.4 overs)		Liam Livingstone 29* (21); Mohammad Nabi 1/16 (3 overs)

England won by 5 wickets
Perth Stadium, Perth
Attendance: 8,405
Umpires: Chris Brown (NZ) and Aleem Dar (Pak)
Player of the match: Sam Curran (Eng)

- England won the toss and elected to field.
- Sam Curran became the first bowler for England to take a five-wicket haul in T20Is.

23 October 2022
15:00
Scorecard

Ireland; 128/8 (20 overs)	v	Sri Lanka; 133/1 (15 overs)
Harry Tector 45 (42); Maheesh Theekshana 2/19 (4 overs)		Kusal Mendis 68* (43); Gareth Delany 1/28 (4 overs)

Sri Lanka won by 9 wickets
Bellerive Oval, Hobart
Attendance: 2,720
Umpires: Chris Gaffaney (NZ) and Ahsan Raza (Pak)
Player of the match: Kusal Mendis (SL)

- Ireland won the toss and elected to bat.

25 October 2022
19:00 (N)
Scorecard

Sri Lanka; 157/6 (20 overs)	v	Australia; 158/3 (16.3 overs)
Pathum Nissanka 40 (45); Glenn Maxwell 1/5 (1 over)		Marcus Stoinis 59* (18); Dhananjaya de Silva 1/18 (2.1 overs)

Australia won by 7 wickets
Perth Stadium, Perth
Attendance: 25,061
Umpires: Marais Erasmus (SA) and Richard Illingworth (Eng)
Player of the match: Marcus Stoinis (Aus)

- Australia won the toss and elected to field.
- Marcus Stoinis scored the fastest half-century for Australia in T20Is from 17 balls.

26 October 2022
15:00
Scorecard

Ireland; 157 (19.2 overs)	v	England; 105/5 (14.3 overs)
Andrew Balbirnie 62 (47); Liam Livingstone 3/17 (3 overs)		Dawid Malan 35 (37); Josh Little 2/16 (3 overs)

Ireland won by 5 runs (DLS method)
Melbourne Cricket Ground, Melbourne
Attendance: 11,369
Umpires: Adrian Holdstock (SA) and Paul Reiffel (Aus)
Player of the match: Andrew Balbirnie (Ire)

- England won the toss and elected to field.
- Rain prevented any further play.
- England were 5 runs behind the DLS par score of 110 runs from 14.3 overs.

26 October 2022
19:00 (N)
Scorecard

Afghanistan	v	New Zealand

Match abandoned
Melbourne Cricket Ground, Melbourne
Attendance: 11,369
Umpires: Kumar Dharmasena (SL) and Paul Wilson (Aus)

- No toss.
- No play was possible due to rain.

28 October 2022
15:00
Scorecard

Afghanistan	v	Ireland

Match abandoned
Melbourne Cricket Ground, Melbourne
Attendance: 37,565
Umpires: Aleem Dar (Pak) and Adrian Holdstock (SA)

- No toss.
- No play was possible due to rain.

28 October 2022
19:00 (N)
Scorecard

Australia	v	England

Match abandoned
Melbourne Cricket Ground, Melbourne
Attendance: 37,565
Umpires: Chris Brown (NZ) and Joel Wilson (WI)

- No toss.
- No play was possible due to rain.

29 October 2022
19:00 (N)
Scorecard

New Zealand; 167/7 (20 overs)	v	Sri Lanka; 102 (19.2 overs)
Glenn Phillips 104 (64); Kasun Rajitha 2/23 (4 overs)		Dasun Shanaka 35 (32); Trent Boult 4/13 (4 overs)

New Zealand won by 65 runs
Sydney Cricket Ground, Sydney
Attendance: 15,121
Umpires: Michael Gough (Eng) and Paul Wilson (Aus)
Player of the match: Glenn Phillips (NZ)

- New Zealand won the toss and elected to bat.

31 October 2022
18:00 (N)
Scorecard

Australia; 179/5 (20 overs)	v	Ireland; 137 (18.1 overs)
Aaron Finch 63 (44); Barry McCarthy 3/29 (4 overs)		Lorcan Tucker 71* (48); Glenn Maxwell 2/14 (2.1 overs)

Australia won by 42 runs
The Gabba, Brisbane
Attendance: 18,869
Umpires: Chris Gaffaney (NZ) and Nitin Menon (Ind)
Player of the match: Aaron Finch (Aus)

- Ireland won the toss and elected to field.
- Aaron Finch (AUS) played his last T20I

1 November 2022
14:00
Scorecard

Afghanistan; 144/8 (20 overs)	v	Sri Lanka; 148/4 (18.3 overs)
Rahmanullah Gurbaz 28 (24); Wanindu Hasaranga 3/13 (4 overs)		Dhananjaya de Silva 66* (42); Mujeeb Ur Rahman 2/24 (4 overs)

Sri Lanka won by 6 wickets
The Gabba, Brisbane
Attendance: 22,547
Umpires: Ahsan Raza (Pak) and Rod Tucker (Aus)
Player of the match: Wanindu Hasaranga (SL)

- Afghanistan won the toss and elected to bat.
- Afghanistan were eliminated as a result of this match.

1 November 2022
18:00 (N)
Scorecard

England; 179/6 (20 overs)	v	New Zealand; 159/6 (20 overs)
Jos Buttler 73 (47); Lockie Ferguson 2/45 (4 overs)		Glenn Phillips 62 (36); Sam Curran 2/26 (4 overs)

England won by 20 runs
The Gabba, Brisbane
Attendance: 22,547
Umpires: Nitin Menon (Ind) and Langton Rusere (Zim)
Player of the match: Jos Buttler (Eng)

- England won the toss and elected to bat.

4 November 2022
14:30
Scorecard

New Zealand; 185/6 (20 overs)	v	Ireland; 150/9 (20 overs)
Kane Williamson 61 (35); Josh Little 3/22 (4 overs)		Paul Stirling 37 (27); Lockie Ferguson 3/22 (4 overs)

New Zealand won by 35 runs
Adelaide Oval, Adelaide
Attendance: 18,672
Umpires: Kumar Dharmasena (SL) and Richard Illingworth (Eng)
Player of the match: Kane Williamson (NZ)

- Ireland won the toss and elected to field.
- Josh Little (Ire) took his first hat-trick in T20Is.
- Ireland were eliminated as a result of this match.

4 November 2022
18:30 (N)
Scorecard

Australia; 168/8 (20 overs)	v	Afghanistan; 164/7 (20 overs)
Glenn Maxwell 54* (32); Naveen-ul-Haq 3/21 (4 overs)		Rashid Khan 48* (23); Adam Zampa 2/22 (4 overs)

Australia won by 4 runs
Adelaide Oval, Adelaide
Attendance: 18,672
Umpires: Aleem Dar (Pak) and Langton Rusere (Zim)
Player of the match: Glenn Maxwell (Aus)

- Afghanistan won the toss and elected to field.
- New Zealand qualified for the semi-finals as a result of this match, while Sri Lanka were eliminated.

5 November 2022
19:00 (N)
Scorecard

Sri Lanka; 141/8 (20 overs)	v	England; 144/6 (19.4 overs)
Pathum Nissanka 67 (45); Mark Wood 3/26 (3 overs)		Alex Hales 47 (30); Wanindu Hasaranga 2/23 (4 overs)

England won by 4 wickets
Sydney Cricket Ground, Sydney
Attendance: 24,250
Umpires: Paul Reiffel (Aus) and Paul Wilson (Aus)
Player of the match: Adil Rashid (Eng)

- Sri Lanka won the toss and elected to bat.
- England qualified for the semi-finals as a result of this match, while Australia were eliminated.

=== Group 2 ===
Pos	Team	Pld	W	L	NR	Pts	NRR	Qualification
1	India	5	4	1	0	8	1.319	Advanced to knockout stage and 2024 Men's T20 World Cup
2	Pakistan	5	3	2	0	6	1.028	Advanced to knockout stage and 2024 Men's T20 World Cup
3	South Africa	5	2	2	1	5	0.874	Qualified for 2024 Men's T20 World Cup
4	Netherlands	5	2	3	0	4	−0.849	Qualified for 2024 Men's T20 World Cup
5	Bangladesh	5	2	3	0	4	−1.176	
6	Zimbabwe	5	1	3	1	3	−1.138	

Source: ESPN Cricinfo

23 October 2022
19:00 (N)
Scorecard

Pakistan; 159/8 (20 overs)	v	India; 160/6 (20 overs)
Shan Masood 52* (42); Hardik Pandya 3/30 (4 overs)		Virat Kohli 82* (53); Haris Rauf 2/36 (4 overs)

India won by 4 wickets
Melbourne Cricket Ground, Melbourne
Attendance: 90,293
Umpires: Marais Erasmus (SA) and Rod Tucker (Aus)
Player of the match: Virat Kohli (Ind)

- India won the toss and elected to field.

24 October 2022
15:00
Scorecard

Bangladesh; 144/8 (20 overs)	v	Netherlands; 135 (20 overs)
Afif Hossain 38 (27); Paul van Meekeren 2/21 (4 overs)		Colin Ackermann 62 (48); Taskin Ahmed 4/25 (4 overs)

Bangladesh won by 9 runs
Bellerive Oval, Hobart
Attendance: 2,585
Umpires: Chris Gaffaney (NZ) and Nitin Menon (Ind)
Player of the match: Taskin Ahmed (Ban)

- Netherlands won the toss and elected to field.

24 October 2022
19:00 (N)
Scorecard

Zimbabwe; 79/5 (9 overs)	v	South Africa; 51/0 (3 overs)
Wesley Madhevere 35* (18); Lungi Ngidi 2/20 (2 overs)		Quinton de Kock 47* (18)

No result
Bellerive Oval, Hobart
Attendance: 2,585
Umpires: Michael Gough (Eng) and Ahsan Raza (Pak)

- Zimbabwe won the toss and elected to bat.
- The match was reduced to 9 overs per side due to rain.
- South Africa were set a revised target of 64 runs in 7 overs due to rain.
- Rain during South Africa's innings prevented any further play.

27 October 2022
14:00
Scorecard

South Africa; 205/5 (20 overs)	v	Bangladesh; 101 (16.3 overs)
Rilee Rossouw 109 (56); Shakib Al Hasan 2/33 (3 overs)		Litton Das 34 (31); Anrich Nortje 4/10 (3.3 overs)

South Africa won by 104 runs
Sydney Cricket Ground, Sydney
Attendance: 36,426
Umpires: Langton Rusere (Zim) and Rod Tucker (Aus)
Player of the match: Rilee Rossouw (SA)

- South Africa won the toss and elected to bat.

27 October 2022
18:00 (N)
Scorecard

India; 179/2 (20 overs)	v	Netherlands; 123/9 (20 overs)
Virat Kohli 62* (44); Paul van Meekeren 1/32 (4 overs)		Tim Pringle 20 (15); Bhuvneshwar Kumar 2/9 (3 overs)

India won by 56 runs
Sydney Cricket Ground, Sydney
Attendance: 36,426
Umpires: Michael Gough (Eng) and Ahsan Raza (Pak)
Player of the match: Suryakumar Yadav (Ind)

- India won the toss and elected to bat.

27 October 2022
19:00 (N)
Scorecard

Zimbabwe; 130/8 (20 overs)	v	Pakistan; 129/8 (20 overs)
Sean Williams 31 (28); Mohammad Wasim 4/24 (4 overs)		Shan Masood 44 (38); Sikandar Raza 3/25 (4 overs)

Zimbabwe won by 1 run
Perth Stadium, Perth
Attendance: 18,006
Umpires: Chris Gaffaney (NZ) and Richard Kettleborough (Eng)
Player of the match: Sikandar Raza (Zim)

- Zimbabwe won the toss and elected to bat.
- This was Zimbabwe's first win over Pakistan in an ICC Tournament.

30 October 2022
13:00
Scorecard

Bangladesh; 150/7 (20 overs)	v	Zimbabwe; 147/8 (20 overs)
Najmul Hossain Shanto 71 (55); Blessing Muzarabani 2/13 (2 overs)		Sean Williams 64 (42); Taskin Ahmed 3/19 (4 overs)

Bangladesh won by 3 runs
The Gabba, Brisbane
Attendance: 5,520
Umpires: Marais Erasmus (SA) and Nitin Menon (Ind)
Player of the match: Taskin Ahmed (Ban)

- Bangladesh won the toss and elected to bat.

30 October 2022
15:00
Scorecard

Netherlands; 91/9 (20 overs)	v	Pakistan; 95/4 (13.5 overs)
Colin Ackermann 27 (27); Shadab Khan 3/22 (4 overs)		Mohammad Rizwan 49 (39); Brandon Glover 2/22 (2.5 overs)

Pakistan won by 6 wickets
Perth Stadium, Perth
Attendance: 44,251
Umpires: Richard Illingworth (Eng) and Paul Reiffel (Aus)
Player of the match: Shadab Khan (Pak)

- Netherlands won the toss and elected to bat.
- Bas de Leede was replaced by Logan van Beek after suffering a concussion during Netherlands' innings.
- This was Pakistan's maiden T20I win in Australia.

30 October 2022
19:00 (N)
Scorecard

India; 133/9 (20 overs)	v	South Africa; 137/5 (19.4 overs)
Suryakumar Yadav 68 (40); Lungi Ngidi 4/29 (4 overs)		David Miller 59* (46); Arshdeep Singh 2/25 (4 overs)

South Africa won by 5 wickets
Perth Stadium, Perth
Attendance: 44,251
Umpires: Richard Kettleborough (Eng) and Langton Rusere (Zim)
Player of the match: Lungi Ngidi (SA)

- India won the toss and elected to bat.
- Netherlands were eliminated as a result of this match.

2 November 2022
14:30
Scorecard

Zimbabwe; 117 (19.2 overs)	v	Netherlands; 120/5 (18 overs)
Sikandar Raza 40 (24); Paul van Meekeren 3/29 (4 overs)		Max O'Dowd 52 (47); Richard Ngarava 2/18 (4 overs)

Netherlands won by 5 wickets
Adelaide Oval, Adelaide
Attendance: 29,302
Umpires: Adrian Holdstock (SA) and Richard Illingworth (Eng)
Player of the match: Max O'Dowd (Ned)

- Zimbabwe won the toss and elected to bat.

2 November 2022
18:30 (N)
Scorecard

India; 184/6 (20 overs)	v	Bangladesh; 145/6 (16 overs)
Virat Kohli 64* (44); Hasan Mahmud 3/47 (4 overs)		Litton Das 60 (27); Hardik Pandya 2/28 (3 overs)

India won by 5 runs (DLS method)
Adelaide Oval, Adelaide
Attendance: 29,302
Umpires: Chris Brown (NZ) and Marais Erasmus (SA)
Player of the match: Virat Kohli (Ind)

- Bangladesh won the toss and elected to field.
- Bangladesh were set a revised target of 151 runs in 16 overs due to rain.
- Virat Kohli (Ind) became the highest run scorer in the ICC T20 World Cup, surpassing Mahela Jayawardene.

3 November 2022
19:00 (N)
Scorecard

Pakistan; 185/9 (20 overs)	v	South Africa; 108/9 (14 overs)
Shadab Khan 52 (22); Anrich Nortje 4/41 (4 overs)		Temba Bavuma 36 (19); Shaheen Afridi 3/14 (3 overs)

Pakistan won by 33 runs (DLS method)
Sydney Cricket Ground, Sydney
Attendance: 30,351
Umpires: Chris Gaffaney (NZ) and Paul Reiffel (Aus)
Player of the match: Shadab Khan (Pak)

- Pakistan won the toss and elected to bat.
- South Africa were set a revised target of 142 runs in 14 overs due to rain.

6 November 2022
10:30
Scorecard

Netherlands; 158/4 (20 overs)	v	South Africa; 145/8 (20 overs)
Colin Ackermann 41* (26); Keshav Maharaj 2/27 (4 overs)		Rilee Rossouw 25 (19); Brandon Glover 3/9 (2 overs)

Netherlands won by 13 runs
Adelaide Oval, Adelaide
Attendance: 12,741
Umpires: Michael Gough (Eng) and Langton Rusere (Zim)
Player of the match: Colin Ackermann (Ned)

- South Africa won the toss and elected to field.
- India qualified for the semi-finals as a result of this match, while South Africa were eliminated.

6 November 2022
14:30
Scorecard

Bangladesh; 127/8 (20 overs)	v	Pakistan; 128/5 (18.1 overs)
Najmul Hossain Shanto 54 (48); Shaheen Afridi 4/22 (4 overs)		Mohammad Rizwan 32 (32); Nasum Ahmed 1/14 (4 overs)

Pakistan won by 5 wickets
Adelaide Oval, Adelaide
Attendance: 12,741
Umpires: Adrian Holdstock (SA) and Joel Wilson (WI)
Player of the match: Shaheen Afridi (Pak)

- Bangladesh won the toss and elected to bat.
- Afif Hossain (Ban) scored his 1,000th run in T20Is.
- Pakistan qualified for the semi-finals as a result of this match, while Bangladesh and Zimbabwe were eliminated.

6 November 2022
19:00 (N)
Scorecard

India; 186/5 (20 overs)	v	Zimbabwe; 115 (17.2 overs)
Suryakumar Yadav 61* (25); Sean Williams 2/9 (2 overs)		Ryan Burl 35 (22); Ravichandran Ashwin 3/22 (4 overs)

India won by 71 runs
Melbourne Cricket Ground, Melbourne
Attendance: 82,507
Umpires: Richard Kettleborough (Eng) and Rod Tucker (Aus)
Player of the match: Suryakumar Yadav (Ind)

- India won the toss and elected to bat.

== Knockout stage ==
Semi-finals
①1	New Zealand	152/4 (20 overs)
②2	Pakistan	153/3 (19.1 overs)
②1	India	168/6 (20 overs)
①2	England	170/0 (16 overs)

Final
②2	Pakistan	137/8 (20 overs)
①2	England	138/5 (19 overs)

=== Semi-finals ===
9 November 2022
19:00 (N)
Scorecard

New Zealand; 152/4 (20 overs)	v	Pakistan; 153/3 (19.1 overs)
Daryl Mitchell 53* (35); Shaheen Afridi 2/24 (4 overs)		Mohammad Rizwan 57 (43); Trent Boult 2/33 (4 overs)

Pakistan won by 7 wickets
Sydney Cricket Ground, Sydney
Attendance: 36,443
Umpires: Marais Erasmus (SA) and Richard Illingworth (Eng)
Player of the match: Mohammad Rizwan (Pak)

- New Zealand won the toss and elected to bat.
- Pakistan qualified for the final for the third time, after 2007 and 2009.

10 November 2022
18:30 (N)
Scorecard

India; 168/6 (20 overs)	v	England; 170/0 (16 overs)
Hardik Pandya 63 (33); Chris Jordan 3/43 (4 overs)		Alex Hales 86* (47)

England won by 10 wickets
Adelaide Oval, Adelaide
Attendance: 40,094
Umpires: Kumar Dharmasena (SL) and Paul Reiffel (Aus)
Player of the match: Alex Hales (Eng)

- England won the toss and elected to field.
- Virat Kohli (Ind) became the first cricketer to score 4000 runs in T20Is.
- The 170-run partnership between England's Jos Buttler and Alex Hales was a record for a men's T20 World Cup match.
- England qualified for the final for the third time, after 2010 and 2016.
- Ravichandran Ashwin (Ind) played in his last T20I match
- This was the highest T20 total India had put in a game losing by ten wickets.

=== Final ===
13 November 2022
19:00 (N)
Scorecard

Pakistan; 137/8 (20 overs)	v	England; 138/5 (19 overs)
Shan Masood 38 (28); Sam Curran 3/12 (4 overs)		Ben Stokes 52* (49); Haris Rauf 2/23 (4 overs)

England won by 5 wickets
Melbourne Cricket Ground, Melbourne
Attendance: 80,462
Umpires: Kumar Dharmasena (SL) and Marais Erasmus (SA)
Player of the match: Sam Curran (Eng)

- England won the toss and elected to field.
- England won their second T20 World Cup title after 12 years, equalling West Indies for the most titles in T20 World Cup.
- England became the first men's team to hold both the ODI (50-over) and T20 World Cups simultaneously.
- Ben Stokes (Eng) played in his last T20I.

Pakistan were asked to bat first who then scored a total of 137 runs for the fall of 8 wickets. Shan Masood was Pakistan's top scorer with 38 runs. England's Sam Curran finished with the figures of 3 wickets for 12 runs.

In the second innings, England finished the six-over powerplay with 49 runs for 3 wickets. In the 13th over, the game changed when Shaheen Shah Afridi slid forward to take a catch off Shadab Khan, dismissing Harry Brook. Shaheen jarred his right knee in the process. With England needing 41 runs off five overs, Shaheen attempted to return for his third over after receiving some treatment. But he pulled out of his run-up once, then sent one down to Moeen Ali at 114 kph. Iftikhar Ahmed then completed Shaheen's remaining over after he took off the field. With scores level after Ben Stokes had brought up his maiden T20I fifty, he scored the winning run with six balls to spare.

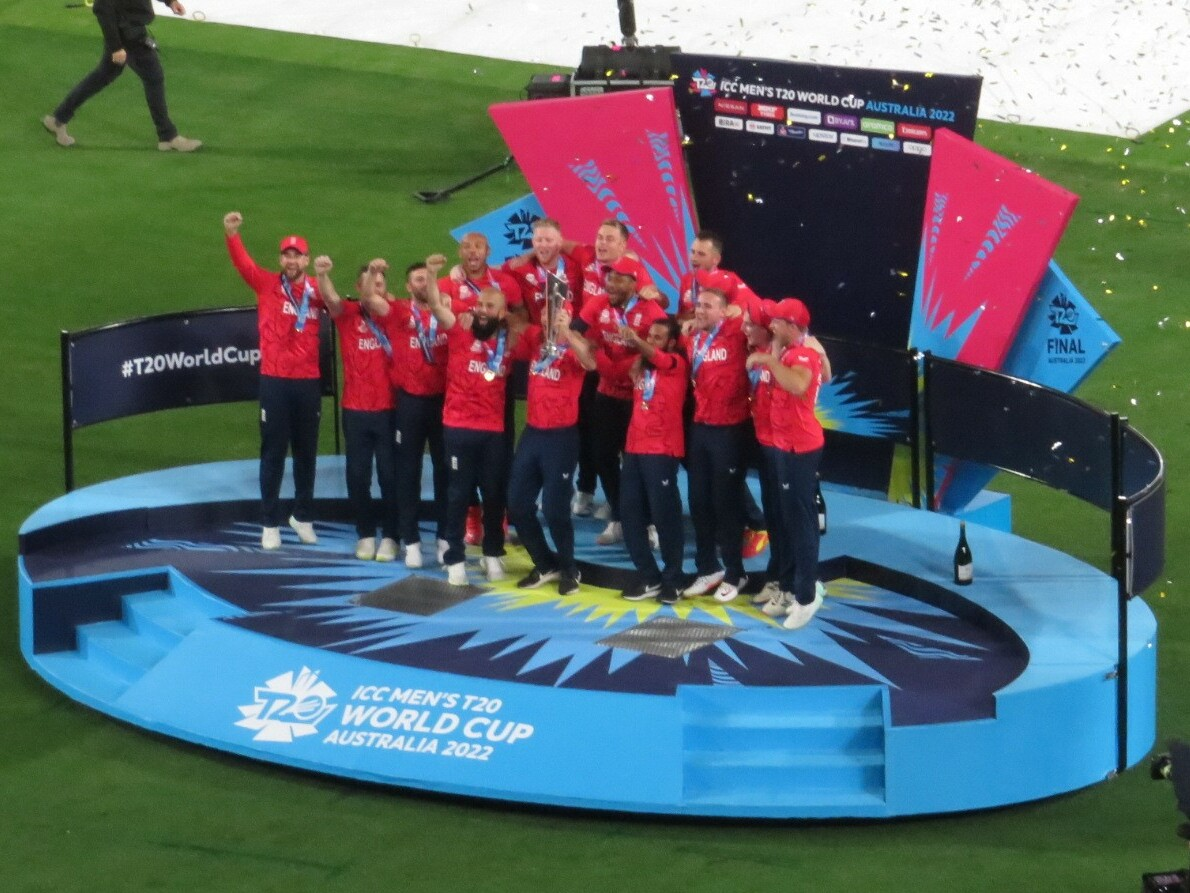
England players celebrating their victory with the 2022 ICC Men's T20 World Cup trophy

== Statistics ==
=== Most runs ===
Player	Matches	Innings	Runs	Average	SR	HS	100	50	4s	6s
(India) Virat Kohli	6	6	296	98.66	136.40	82*	0	4	25	8
(Netherlands) Max O'Dowd	8	8	242	34.57	112.55	71*	0	2	22	8
(India) Suryakumar Yadav	6	6	239	59.75	189.68	68	0	3	26	9
(England) Jos Buttler	6	6	225	45.00	144.23	80*	0	2	24	7
(Sri Lanka) Kusal Mendis	8	8	223	31.85	142.94	79	0	2	17	10
Source: ESPNcricinfo

=== Most wickets ===
Player	Matches	Innings	Wickets	Overs	Econ.	Ave.	BBI	S/R	4WI	5WI
(Sri Lanka) Wanindu Hasaranga	8	8	15	31.0	6.41	13.26	3/8	12.40	0	0
(England) Sam Curran	6	6	13	22.4	6.52	11.38	5/10	10.46	0	1
(Netherlands) Bas de Leede	8	7	13	22.0	7.68	13.00	3/19	10.15	0	0
(Zimbabwe) Blessing Muzarabani	8	7	12	26.0	7.65	16.58	3/23	13.00	0	0
(South Africa) Anrich Nortje	5	5	11	17.3	5.37	8.54	4/10	9.54	2	0
Source: ESPNcricinfo

== Team of the tournament ==
On 14 November 2022, the ICC announced its team of the tournament with Sam Curran being named as player of the tournament, and Jos Buttler as the captain of the team.

Player	Role
(Pakistan) Mohammad Rizwan	Batsman
(England) Jos Buttler	Batsman / Wicket-keeper / Captain
(India) Virat Kohli	Batsman
(India) Suryakumar Yadav	Batsman
(New Zealand) Glenn Phillips	Batsman
(Zimbabwe) Sikandar Raza	All-rounder
(Pakistan) Shadab Khan	All-rounder
(England) Sam Curran	All-rounder
(South Africa) Anrich Nortje	Bowler
(England) Mark Wood	Bowler
(Pakistan) Shaheen Afridi	Bowler
(India) Hardik Pandya	All-rounder / 12th man
