= 2023 Nepal Tri-Nation Series (March) =

International cricket tournament

- Part of 2019–2023 ICC Cricket World Cup League 2
- Date: 9–16 March 2023
- Location: Nepal
Teams
Nepal	Papua New Guinea	United Arab Emirates
Captains
Rohit Paudel	Assad Vala	Muhammad Waseem
Most runs
Aasif Sheikh (163)	Assad Vala (127)	Muhammad Waseem (224)
Most wickets
Sandeep Lamichhane (12)	Riley Hekure (8)	Aayan Afzal Khan (7)

The 2023 Nepal Tri-Nation Series was the 21st, and last, round of the 2019–2023 ICC Cricket World Cup League 2 cricket tournament took place in Nepal in March 2023. It was a tri-nation series between Nepal, Papua New Guinea and the United Arab Emirates cricket teams, with the matches played as One Day International (ODI) fixtures. The ICC Cricket World Cup League 2 formed part of the qualification pathway to the 2023 Cricket World Cup. Going into the final series of the League 2 tournament, Nepal required four wins from four games to claim the third and final automatic place in the 2023 Cricket World Cup Qualifier, at the expense of Namibia.

== Squads ==
Nepal	Papua New Guinea	United Arab Emirates
Rohit Paudel (c); Dipendra Singh Airee; Kushal Bhurtel; Pratis GC; Gulsan Jha; Sompal Kami; Karan KC; Sandeep Lamichhane; Gyanendra Malla (wk); Kushal Malla; Lalit Rajbanshi; Bhim Sharki; Aarif Sheikh; Aasif Sheikh (wk)	Assad Vala (c); Charles Amini; Sese Bau; Kiplin Doriga (wk); Riley Hekure; Hiri Hiri; Semo Kamea; John Kariko; Kabua Morea; Alei Nao; Chad Soper; Gaudi Toka; Tony Ura; Norman Vanua; Hila Vare (wk)	Muhammad Waseem (c); Vriitya Aravind (wk); Hazrat Bilal; Zawar Farid; Aayan Afzal Khan; Asif Khan; Zahoor Khan; Aryan Lakra; Karthik Meiyappan; Rohan Mustafa; Chundangapoyil Rizwan; Aryansh Sharma (wk); Junaid Siddique; Ashwanth Valthapa

Nepal named Kamal Singh Airee, Mousom Dhakal, Sundeep Jora and Arjun Saud as reserves in their squad.

== Fixtures ==
=== 1st ODI ===
9 March 2023
09:30
Scorecard

Nepal; 297 (49.1 overs)	v	Papua New Guinea; 245 (47.1 overs)
Aasif Sheikh 110 (110); Semo Kamea 5/38 (9.1 overs)		Norman Vanua 60 (55); Sandeep Lamichhane 4/37 (10 overs)

Nepal won by 52 runs
Tribhuvan University International Cricket Ground, Kirtipur
Umpires: Vinay Kumar Jha (Nep) and Raveendra Wimalasiri (SL)
Player of the match: Aasif Sheikh (Nep)

- Papua New Guinea won the toss and elected to field.
- Aasif Sheikh (Nep) scored his first century in ODIs, and also passed 1,000 runs in ODIs.
- Semo Kamea (PNG) took his first five-wicket haul in ODIs.
- Nepal's score of 297 was their highest total in ODIs.

=== 2nd ODI ===
10 March 2023
09:30
Scorecard

Papua New Guinea; 246/9 (50 overs)	v	United Arab Emirates; 190 (42.2 overs)
Sese Bau 81* (106); Aayan Afzal Khan 3/34 (10 overs)		Aryan Lakra 51 (72); Riley Hekure 3/16 (7.2 overs)

Papua New Guinea won by 56 runs
Tribhuvan University International Cricket Ground, Kirtipur
Umpires: Vinay Kumar Jha (Nep) and Buddhi Pradhan (Nep)
Player of the match: Sese Bau (PNG)

- United Arab Emirates won the toss and elected to field.

=== 3rd ODI ===
12 March 2023
09:30
Scorecard

Nepal; 248 (49.2 overs)	v	United Arab Emirates; 71 (22.5 overs)
Rohit Paudel 77 (112); Zawar Farid 2/9 (3 overs)		Aayan Afzal Khan 29 (33); Lalit Rajbanshi 5/20 (7.5 overs)

Nepal won by 177 runs
Tribhuvan University International Cricket Ground, Kirtipur
Umpires: Buddhi Pradhan (Nep) and Raveendra Wimalasiri (SL)
Player of the match: Rohit Paudel (Nep)

- Nepal won the toss and elected to bat.
- Ashwanth Valthapa (UAE) made his ODI debut.
- Lalit Rajbanshi (Nep) took his first five-wicket haul in ODIs.
- United Arab Emirates' score of 71 was their lowest total in ODIs.

=== 4th ODI ===
13 March 2023
09:30
Scorecard

Papua New Guinea; 95 (32 overs)	v	Nepal; 100/1 (7.4 overs)
Assad Vala 20 (31); Sandeep Lamichhane 5/25 (10 overs)		Aasif Sheikh 53* (21); Chad Soper 1/30 (2.4 overs)

Nepal won by 9 wickets
Tribhuvan University International Cricket Ground, Kirtipur
Umpires: Vinay Kumar Jha (Nep) and Raveendra Wimalasiri (SL)
Player of the match: Sandeep Lamichhane (Nep)

- Nepal won the toss and elected to field.

=== 5th ODI ===
15 March 2023
09:30
Scorecard

Papua New Guinea; 234/7 (50 overs)	v	United Arab Emirates; 236/4 (38.4 overs)
Assad Vala 65 (92); Hazrat Bilal 4/47 (10 overs)		Muhammad Waseem 119 (76); Riley Hekure 2/24 (7 overs)

United Arab Emirates won by 6 wickets
Tribhuvan University International Cricket Ground, Kirtipur
Umpires: Vinay Kumar Jha (Nep) and Buddhi Pradhan (Nep)
Player of the match: Muhammad Waseem (UAE)

- Papua New Guinea won the toss and elected to bat.
- John Kariko (PNG) made his ODI debut.
- Muhammad Waseem (UAE) scored his first century in ODIs.

=== 6th ODI ===
16 March 2023
09:30
Scorecard

United Arab Emirates; 310/6 (50 overs)	v	Nepal; 269/6 (44 overs)
Asif Khan 101* (42); Dipendra Singh Airee 2/19 (8 overs)		Bhim Sharki 67 (76); Junaid Siddique 3/51 (10 overs)

Nepal won by 9 runs (DLS method)
Tribhuvan University International Cricket Ground, Kirtipur
Umpires: Buddhi Pradhan (Nep) and Raveendra Wimalasiri (SL)
Player of the match: Asif Khan (UAE)

- United Arab Emirates won the toss and elected to bat.
- No further play was possible due to bad light.
- Asif Khan (UAE) scored his first century in ODIs.
- Asif Khan scored the fastest century by a player from an associate nation, and the fourth fastest overall in terms of number of balls faced in an ODI (41).
