= Dhruv Parashar =

Indian-born cricketer

Personal information
- Full name: Dhruv Parashar
- Born: 20 December 2004 (age 21); Pune, Maharashtra, India
- Batting: Right-handed
- Bowling: Right-arm off spin
- Role: All-rounder

International information
- National side: United Arab Emirates
- ODI debut (cap 113): 01 November 2024 v Oman
- Last ODI: 09 November 2024 v Netherlands
- T20I debut (cap 73): 31 December 2023 v Afghanistan
- Last T20I: 21 December 2024 v Kuwait

Domestic team information
- Years: Team
- 2025-present: Desert Vipers

Career statistics
Competition	ODI	T20I	T20
Matches	4	14	21
Runs scored	58	72	78
Batting average	19.33	14.40	11.14
100s/50s	0/1	0/0	0/0
Top score	50*	17*	17*
Balls bowled	192	270	328
Wickets	5	18	19
Bowling average	18.60	13.61	16.00
5 wickets in innings	0	0	0
10 wickets in match	0	0	0
Best bowling	2/16	4/12	4/12
Catches/stumpings	0/–	9/–	9/–
- Source: ESPNCricinfo

Dhruv Parashar (born 20 December 2004) is an Indian-born cricketer who plays for the United Arab Emirates national cricket team, as an all-rounder.

== Early life and education ==
Parashar was born in Pune in India. He attended Wellington School, Somerset, where he played for the school's 1st XI cricket team.

== Career ==
Parashar was selected for the 2023 ACC Under-19 Asia Cup, where the UAE team finished runners-up, defeating Pakistan in the semi-finals before losing to Bangladesh in the final. Shortly after this tournament, he was selected for his senior T20I debut in the home series against Afghanistan. He made his ODI debut in November 2024 during the Tri-Nation Series in Oman (also involving Netherlands) as part of the 2024-2026 Cricket World Cup League 2. Although he was out for 5 runs opening the innings, he claimed 2/16 in his 10 overs on debut. He also holds a global record of opening the batting and bowling in the same match. He is the first and youngest cricketer to do so.

In January 2023, Parashar was selected by the Desert Vipers as an injury replacement player for Ronak Panoly during the inaugural International League T20 tournament. However, he did not make his debut for Desert Vipers until the 2024/25 ILT20 tournament. He played 6 games for the franchise that season.

In January 2026, Parashar was named in UAE's squad for the 2026 T20 World Cup.
