= John Kariko =

Papua New Guinean cricketer

Personal information
- Born: 16 January 2004 (age 22)
- Batting: Left-handed
- Bowling: Left-arm orthodox spin
- Role: Bowler

International information
- National side: Papua New Guinea
- ODI debut (cap 29): 15 March 2023 v United Arab Emirates
- Last ODI: 5 April 2023 v Canada
- T20I debut (cap 28): 22 July 2023 v Vanuatu
- Last T20I: 13 June 2024 v Afghanistan

Career statistics
Competition	ODI	T20I	LA
Matches	3	19	8
Runs scored	8	16	12
Batting average	4.00	8.00	6.00
100s/50s	0/0	0/0	0/0
Top score	5	9*	8
Balls bowled	126	407	288
Wickets	5	26	8
Bowling average	22.80	12.88	26.87
5 wickets in innings	0	0	0
10 wickets in match	0	0	0
Best bowling	4/45	4/11	4/45
Catches/stumpings	0/–	6/–	3/–
- Source: Cricinfo, 7 August 2025

John Kariko (born 16 January 2004) is a cricketer from Papua New Guinea. He is a left arm spin bowler and left-handed batsman.

== Early and personal life ==
His father was a cricketer but Kariko preferred volleyball as a youngster and only started playing cricket as a teenager.

== Career ==
A slow left-armer spin bowler, he played for his country at the 2022 Under-19 Men's Cricket World Cup held in the West Indies, taking five for 19 against Uganda in the Plate play-off semi-finals. Against Uganda he was also dismissed via a mankad dismissal by Ugandan bowler Cyrus Kakuru.

In February 2023, he was named in Papua New Guinea's ODI squads for both the 2023 United Arab Emirates Tri-Nation Series and 2023 Nepal Tri-Nation Series, and in T20I squad for the 2022–23 ICC Men's T20 World Cup East Asia-Pacific Qualifier. He made his One Day International debut against United Arab Emirates in the 2023 Nepal Tri-Nation Series, which was part of 2019–2023 ICC Cricket World Cup League 2, on 15 March 2023. He made his Twenty20 International debut against Vanuatu in the East Asia-Pacific Qualifier, on 22 July 2023. He got player of the match award on his T20I debut game for his impressive bowling spell of 3/6 in 4 overs, against Vanuatu.

He was part of the Papua New Guinea side that qualified for the 2024 ICC Men's T20 World Cup. He was subsequently named in the Papua New Guinea squad for the tournament. He made his T20 World Cup debut on 2 June 2024 against the West Indies in Guyana, taking the wicket of Nicholas Pooran and bowling his full allocation of four overs.

In May 2024, he was named in Papua New Guinea's squad for the 2024 ICC Men's T20 World Cup tournament.
