= 2021 Men's T20 World Cup EAP qualifier =

Cricket tournament

The 2021 ICC Men's T20 World Cup East Asia-Pacific Qualifier was scheduled to be a tournament played as part of qualification process for the 2022 ICC Men's T20 World Cup. It was scheduled to take place from 11 to 16 October 2021 in Japan, with the top team progressing to one of two global qualifiers. In April 2018, the International Cricket Council (ICC) granted full international status to Twenty20 men's matches played between member sides from 1 January 2019 onwards. Therefore, all the matches in the Regional Qualifiers would have been played as Twenty20 Internationals (T20Is).

Originally the qualifier was scheduled to take place between March and September 2020, but was postponed due to the COVID-19 pandemic. In December 2020, the ICC updated the qualification pathway following the disruption from the pandemic. In August 2021, the ICC confirmed that the tournament had been cancelled due to the COVID-19 pandemic. As a result, the Philippines advanced to the Global Qualifiers as the highest-ranked team in the EAP region.

== Regional Final ==
2021 ICC Men's T20 World Cup East Asia-Pacific Qualifier Regional Final
- Dates: 11 – 16 October 2021
- Administrator: East Asia-Pacific
- Cricket format: T20I
- Host: Japan
- Participants: 8

=== Participating teams ===
The following teams were scheduled to take part:

- Cook Islands
- Fiji
- Indonesia
- Japan
- Philippines
- Samoa
- South Korea
- Vanuatu
