= Mohammad Nabi =

Afghan cricketer (born 1985)

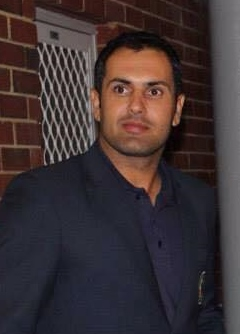
- Nabi in 2014

Personal information
- Full name: Mohammad Nabi Eisakhil
- Born: 1 January 1985 (age 41) (Note: His date of birth is given as 7 March 1985 by CricketArchive and Sky Sports. Other sources give it as 1 January. 1 January is used by many Afghans as a de facto date of birth, particularly those born during the 1980s and 1990s, as dates of birth were often not recorded accurately or at all, particularly during the wars fought in the country since 1978.); Logar, Afghanistan
- Nickname: The President, Mr. President
- Height: 6 ft 0 in (1.83 m)
- Batting: Right-handed
- Bowling: Right-arm off spin
- Role: All-rounder
- Relatives: Hassan Eisakhil (son)

International information
- National side: Afghanistan (2009–present)
- Test debut (cap 5): 14 June 2018 v India
- Last Test: 5 September 2019 v Bangladesh
- ODI debut (cap 7): 19 April 2009 v Scotland
- Last ODI: 20 June 2026 v India
- ODI shirt no.: 7
- T20I debut (cap 5): 1 February 2010 v Ireland
- Last T20I: 19 February 2026 v Canada
- T20I shirt no.: 7

Domestic team information
- Years: Team
- 2007/08–2009/10 (Note: Only clubs for which Nabi has played for in more than one season are included in this list.): Pakistan Customs cricket team
- 2013/14–2014/15: Mohammedan Sporting Club
- 2017–2021: Sunrisers Hyderabad
- 2017/18–2021/22: Melbourne Renegades
- 2021–2022; 2025: Karachi Kings

Career statistics
Competition	Test	ODI	T20I	FC
Matches	3	178	152	35
Runs scored	33	3,792	2,448	1,284
Batting average	5.50	27.47	22.25	24.22
100s/50s	0/0	2/18	0/7	2/5
Top score	24	136	89	117
Balls bowled	546	8,054	2,482	4,848
Wickets	8	177	109	94
Bowling average	31.75	32.80	27.77	23.17
5 wickets in innings	0	1	0	3
10 wickets in match	0	0	0	0
Best bowling	3/36	5/17	4/7	6/33
Catches/stumpings	2/–	85/–	82/–	20/–
Medal record
Representing Afghanistan
Men's Cricket
Asian Games
Silver medal – second place	2010 Guangzhou	Team
Silver medal – second place	2014 Incheon	Team
- Source: ESPNcricinfo, 19 July 2026

Mohammad Nabi Eisakhil (Pashto: محمد نبي عیسی خېل; born 1 January 1985) is an Afghan cricketer and former captain of the Afghanistan national cricket team. Nabi is an attacking batting all-rounder, playing as a right-handed batsman and off-break bowler.

He played a major role in Afghanistan's rise to the top level of international cricket, playing in both their first One Day International in April 2009 and their first Test match in June 2018. He was also part of Afghanistan's first T20I team which played against Ireland on 1 February 2010 and became the fifth cap of Afghanistan national team in Twenty20 Internationals. Nabi was also part of Afghanistan's first T20 World Cup team which played the 2010 ICC World Twenty20. He captained the team during their appearances in the 2014 Asia Cup and the 2015 Cricket World Cup. Nabi has also played in numerous Twenty20 franchise tournaments and was the first player from Afghanistan to be selected in the Indian Premier League player auction. As of June 2024, Nabi holds a unique record of having been an integral part of Afghanistan team in defeating 45 nations in international cricket.

In September 2019, Nabi retired from Test cricket with the stated aim to prolong his limited overs cricket career. In August 2020, Nabi was inducted as a member of the Afghanistan Cricket Board.

== Early life and career ==
Nabi was born in Logar Province in Afghanistan into a prosperous industrial family. His family moved to Peshawar in Pakistan, fleeing from the Soviet–Afghan War. He started playing cricket in Peshawar at the age of 10, and his family moved back to Afghanistan in 2000, where he began playing cricket with Mohammad Shahzad, Asghar Afghan and Shapoor Zadran, all of whom would later become important members of the Afghan national team. Nabi played his first competitive match in 2003 for an Afghanistan team against the Rahim Yar Khan Cricket Association. Afghanistan's team was poor, but Nabi top-scored for the team with 61 runs. During this time Afghanistan didn't have their own cricket gear and had to rely on buying it from Pakistan and India.

In 2006, Nabi played for Afghanistan in a tour match against the Marylebone Cricket Club (MCC) in Mumbai, India. He top-scored for Afghanistan with 116 in a big win, and was noticed by former English Test captain Mike Gatting. Nabi was then included in the MCC's Young Cricketers programme in England. While with the MCC Nabi made his first-class debut in a tour match against Sri Lanka A in 2007, top-scoring for his team in the first innings with 43 runs. Following this he played domestic cricket in Pakistan for Pakistan Customs, making his List A debut against National Bank of Pakistan on 20 March 2008 during the ABN-AMRO Cup.

== International career ==
=== Afghanistan's rise to ODI status (2008–2009) ===
Mohammad was part of Afghanistan's "staggering" rise from Division Five of the World Cricket League to One Day International status. This began in the 2008 ICC World Cricket League Division Five, which Afghanistan won. Nabi played in all seven of Afghanistan's matches for the tournament, scoring 108 runs and taking 10 wickets, the second-most for Afghanistan in each. This success was followed by the 2008 ICC World Cricket League Division Four, which Afghanistan also won. Nabi was named the man of the tournament, having taken 14 wickets at an average of 5.35 and scored 154 runs at an average of 25.66.

Nabi was also in Afghanistan's team for the 2009 ICC World Cricket League Division Three, which they won to progress to the 2009 Cricket World Cup Qualifier. Though Afghanistan did not qualify for the 2011 Cricket World Cup, they did achieve One Day International (ODI) status, and their final match of the tournament, the fifth-place play-off against Scotland, was the country's first ever ODI. Nabi scored 58 to get his maiden ODI half-century on his ODI debut, a match which Afghanistan won. He was named player of the match.

=== Early international career (2009–2013) ===
Nabi played his first first-class match for Afghanistan in the 2009–10 ICC Intercontinental Cup against a Zimbabwe XI, scoring a century and taking 3/90 in the first innings. He continued to be an important part of Afghanistan's team in the Intercontinental Cup, and also played a crucial role for the team in the 2010 ICC World Twenty20 Qualifier, through which Afghanistan qualified for the 2010 ICC World Twenty20.

Having been a consistent performer for Afghanistan and vice-captain under Nawroz Mangal's captaincy, when Mangal was removed from the captaincy ahead of the 2010 Asian Games, Nabi was appointed Afghanistan's captain. Afghanistan finished the Asian Games runners-up after losing the final to Bangladesh, and Nabi didn't remain captain after the games.

=== Captaincy (2013–2015) ===
In March 2013, Afghanistan Cricket Board (ACB) announced that Nabi would lead the national team in the ICC Intercontinental Cup in the UAE, after Nawroz Mangal was stripped of the captaincy following his dismal show in the limited-over series in Pakistan the previous month. Under his captaincy, Afghanistan went to the 2014 Asia Cup, their first ever major international ODI tournament. During the tournament they defeated Bangladesh in just their fourth match against a Test nation. Nabi remained captain through the 2014 ICC World Twenty20 and the 2015 Cricket World Cup, but due to poor form and Afghanistan only winning one match in the World Cup, he resigned as captain in April 2015.

=== Post-captaincy (2015–onwards) ===
Nabi's poor form continued after resigning the captaincy until Afghanistan's bilateral ODI series against Zimbabwe. During the series, Afghanistan's new coach Inzamam-ul-Haq promoted Nabi up the batting order from number 6 to number 3 and his batting improved dramatically, scoring his maiden ODI century and 223 runs during the series to be named the player of the series. Afghanistan won the series 3–2, the first time an associate team had ever beaten a full member in a bilateral series.

Nabi took on major responsibility in the 2016 ICC World Twenty20 to help Afghanistan win against Hong Kong and Zimbabwe in the group stage. Nabi was the man of the match in both these matches and Afghanistan advanced to the Super 10 round. Nabi performed strongly in Afghanistan's match against England as they almost caused a major upset. Nabi took a catch, took a wicket bowling and effected a run-out during the match but England hung on to win by 15 runs.

In May 2018, he was named in Afghanistan's squad for their inaugural Test match, played against India. He made his Test debut for Afghanistan, against India, on 14 June 2018. In February 2019, he was named in Afghanistan's Test squad for their one-off match against Ireland in India. In 2019, in first T20I against Ireland he won the man of the match for his 49 runs and 2 wickets. Again in the 3rd T20I as well, Nabi scored an 81 and bowled an economical spell of 0-28(4) to win the man of the match and series.

In April 2019, he was named in Afghanistan's squad for the 2019 Cricket World Cup. On 29 June 2019, in the match against Pakistan, Nabi took his 200th wicket in international cricket. He finished the tournament as the leading wicket-taker for Afghanistan, with ten dismissals in nine matches.

During the one-off Test match against Bangladesh, he announced his retirement from Test cricket to focus on white-ball cricket. In September 2021, he was named as captain in Afghanistan's squad for the 2021 ICC Men's T20 World Cup.

He stepped down from captaincy following the conclusion of the 2022 ICC Men's T20 World Cup due to disagreements with the team management and frustration with the team preparation. His poor performance also got himself dropped from Afghanistan's T20I squad for their series against UAE. However, in March 2023, he returned to the T20I squad for the series against Pakistan. On 24 March 2023, in the first T20I, he scored 38 runs from 38 balls, and picked up 2 wickets for 12 runs. His all-round performance helped Afghanistan to clinch first ever win over Pakistan in any format of international cricket.

On 12 March 2024, he picked up his maiden five-wicket haul in ODI cricket, against Ireland in the third ODI. In May 2024, he was named in Afghanistan's squad for the 2024 ICC Men's T20 World Cup tournament.

== Domestic and T20 franchise career ==
Nabi has played in numerous Twenty20 franchise tournaments around the world, including the Bangladesh Premier League, the Pakistan Super League, the Indian Premier League, the Caribbean Premier League, the Big Bash League, the Vitality Blast and the Afghanistan Premier League. He was the first ever player from Afghanistan to be bought in the IPL player auction.

=== Bangladesh Premier League ===
Nabi played in the Bangladesh Premier League for the first time in 2013 for the Sylhet Royals. He was brought into the team to replace injured West Indian all-rounder Andre Russell as the team's coach Mohammad Salahuddin wanted an offspinner in the team. He performed well for the Royals with both bat and ball, particularly bowling well at the start of innings, and he finished the tournament as the team's leading wicket-taker with 18 wickets.

Nabi was drafted by the Rangpur Riders for the 2015 edition of the tournament, in which he took seven wickets and scored 37 runs. He was then signed for the 2016 tournament by the Chittagong Vikings. He had considerable success, taking 19 wickets, the most for Chittagong and the third-most across the whole tournament, and scoring his maiden BPL half-century and career-highest score with 87 not out in a match against the Rajshahi Kings. He changed teams to the Comilla Victorians for the 2017 tournament. In November 2019, he was selected to play for the Rangpur Rangers in the 2019–20 Bangladesh Premier League. In the 2025 edition of the BPL he joined Fortune Barishal team.

=== Pakistan Super League ===
Nabi played for the Quetta Gladiators in the 2016 Pakistan Super League, the inaugural season of the tournament. He played eight matches for the Gladiators, and in his final match for the tournament against Lahore Qalandars he scored 30 runs off of 12 balls, including hitting 4 runs off the final ball of the match to win the game for the Gladiators. Nabi left the tournament early to play for Afghanistan in the 2016 Asia Cup Qualifier and was replaced in the team by Nathan McCullum. Nabi signed to the Karachi Kings in the 2021 Pakistan Super League. In December 2021, he was signed by the Karachi Kings following the players' draft for the 2022 Pakistan Super League.

=== Indian Premier League ===
In the 2017 IPL auction, Nabi became the first Afghan player to be sold in the IPL, going to Sunrisers Hyderabad at his base price of 30 lakh. He had been the third player from Afghanistan to go up in the 2017 auction, but the first two both went unsold. He was followed by Afghan teammate Rashid Khan, who also went to Hyderabad. Nabi only played three matches in the 2017 tournament. In January 2018, Nabi was again bought by the Sunrisers Hyderabad in the 2018 IPL auction, this time for 1 crore, but he still only played two matches. In February 2022, he was bought by the Kolkata Knight Riders in the auction for the 2022 Indian Premier League tournament.

=== Other leagues ===
In September 2018, he was named in Balkh's squad in the first edition of the Afghanistan Premier League tournament.

Nabi played for Leicestershire County Cricket Club in the 2018 t20 Blast. In a match against Lancashire he scored 86 runs from 32 balls to help secure a five wicket victory for the team. In February 2019, he signed to play for Kent County Cricket Club in the 2019 edition of the competition. In November 2019, he once again signed to play for Kent, for the 2020 t20 Blast in England.

Nabi played for the Melbourne Renegades in the 2017–18 and 2018–19 Big Bash League seasons. In December 2018 he hit the winning runs against the defending champions Adelaide Strikers after a 94 run unbeaten partnership with Dan Christian.

In July 2020, he was named in the St Lucia Zouks squad for the 2020 Caribbean Premier League. On 27 August 2020, in the match against the St Kitts & Nevis Patriots, Nabi took his first five-wicket haul in a T20 match.

== Records ==
- Nabi holds the record for the fastest fifty by an Afghan cricketer in Twenty20 Internationals (T20Is).
- On 15 March 2018, during the 2018 Cricket World Cup Qualifier match against the West Indies, he became the first bowler for Afghanistan to take 100 wickets in One Day Internationals (ODIs).
- In August 2018, during Afghanistan's tour of Ireland, he became the first cricketer for Afghanistan to play in 100 ODI matches. It was also the 100th ODI to be played by the Afghanistan cricket team.
- Nabi has involved in part of Afghanistan's wins at international cricket by playing against 45 different nations (Bahrain, Malaysia, Saudi Arabia, Kuwait. Qatar, Iran, Thailand, Nepal, United Arab Emirates, Japan, Bahamas, Botswana, Jersey, Fiji, Tanzania, Italy, Hong Kong, Argentina, Papua New Guinea, Cayman Islands, Oman, Denmark, Bermuda, Ireland, Scotland, Netherlands, China, Namibia, Singapore, Canada, United States of America, Kenya, Trinidad and Tobago, Bhutan, Maldives, Barbados, Uganda, Bangladesh, Zimbabwe, Pakistan, Sri Lanka, West Indies, Sri Lanka, England, New Zealand and Australia)

== ICC Code of Conduct breaches ==
Nabi has twice been found guilty of breaching the ICC Code of Conduct in international cricket matches, both times while playing against Ireland.

The first incident was in an ODI against Ireland in July 2016. During Ireland's batting innings, Nabi claimed to have kept the ball inside the boundary on a ball where Irish batsman Ed Joyce was run out. The umpires had to accept Nabi's word that he had kept the ball in play and Joyce was judged run out, but later photographic evidence showed that Nabi was in contact with the ball while outside the boundary and therefore it should have been four runs and Joyce should not have been dismissed. Nabi was found guilty of "conduct that is contrary to the spirit of the game" and was reprimanded. Afghanistan went on to win the match by 79 runs.

The second incident was in a first-class match against Ireland in March 2017. Nabi celebrated taking a catch and appealed to the umpire despite the ball clearly having hit the ground. Again, he was found guilty of conduct contrary to the spirit of the game, and he was given one demerit point. His teammate Dawlat Zadran was also warned for a separate incident during the match. Afghanistan won the match by an innings and 172 runs.

== Personal life ==
He is the father of one Afghani cricketer Hassan Eisakhil.
