= 2019–2023 Cricket World Cup League 2 =

International cricket tournament

2019–2023 ICC Cricket World Cup League 2
- Dates: 14 August 2019 – 16 March 2023
- Administrator: International Cricket Council
- Cricket format: One Day International
- Tournament format: Tri Series
- Host: Various
- Champions: Scotland (1st title)
- Runners-up: Oman
- Participants: 7
- Matches: 126
- Most runs: (Namibia) Gerhard Erasmus (1298)
- Most wickets: (Oman) Bilal Khan (76)

The 2019–2023 ICC Cricket World Cup League 2 was the first edition of the ICC Cricket World Cup League 2, a cricket tournament which formed part of the 2023 Cricket World Cup qualification process. The tournament was played from August 2019 to March 2023, with all matches played as One Day Internationals (ODIs). Each set of fixtures was planned to take place as a tri-series.

Scotland, Nepal and the United Arab Emirates were joined by the top four teams from the 2019 ICC World Cricket League Division Two tournament. Round 1 was played in Aberdeen, Scotland in August 2019.

The league table combined both the qualification for the 2023 World Cup with the system of promotion and relegation for the following editions of the various cricket leagues. For qualification to the World Cup, the top three teams advanced directly to the 2023 Cricket World Cup Qualifier tournament, while the bottom four teams were sent to the 2023 ICC Cricket World Cup Qualifier Play-off. In that Play-off those bottom four teams were joined by the top two teams from the Challenge League, with the top two teams from that Play-off advancing to the Qualifier Tournament.

For promotion, it was originally intended that the top-ranked team in this CWC League 2 would gain the opportunity to be promoted to the 2020–2023 ICC Cricket World Cup Super League if it finished higher than the 13th-placed Super League team at the 2023 Cricket World Cup Qualifier. However, in November 2021, the ICC announced that there would not be a second edition of the Super League, guaranteeing that Scotland would remain in the next League 2.

For relegation, United Arab Emirates and Papua New Guinea finished 6th and 7th, respectively. As a result, the Play-off tournament for them not only determined qualification for the World Cup, but also whether or not they would be relegated to the Challenge League. Among the six teams in that Play-off, the two teams among the United Arab Emirates, Papua New Guinea, Canada and Jersey (who had finished in the top two of the Challenge League), would qualify for the next edition of League 2. For the teams that finished 4th and 5th, Namibia and The United States, the play-off would determine only their World Cup qualification—even last place finishes for those teams would not result in relegation.

Scotland secured first place in the league on 15 February 2023 with a 10-wicket win against Namibia. They were presented with the trophy at the end of round 19 of the tournament in Kirtipur. Oman and Nepal finished in second and third place, respectively, with Nepal winning 11 of their final 12 matches to pass Namibia in the final match of the tournament and secure a place in the 2023 Cricket World Cup Qualifier tournament.

== Teams ==
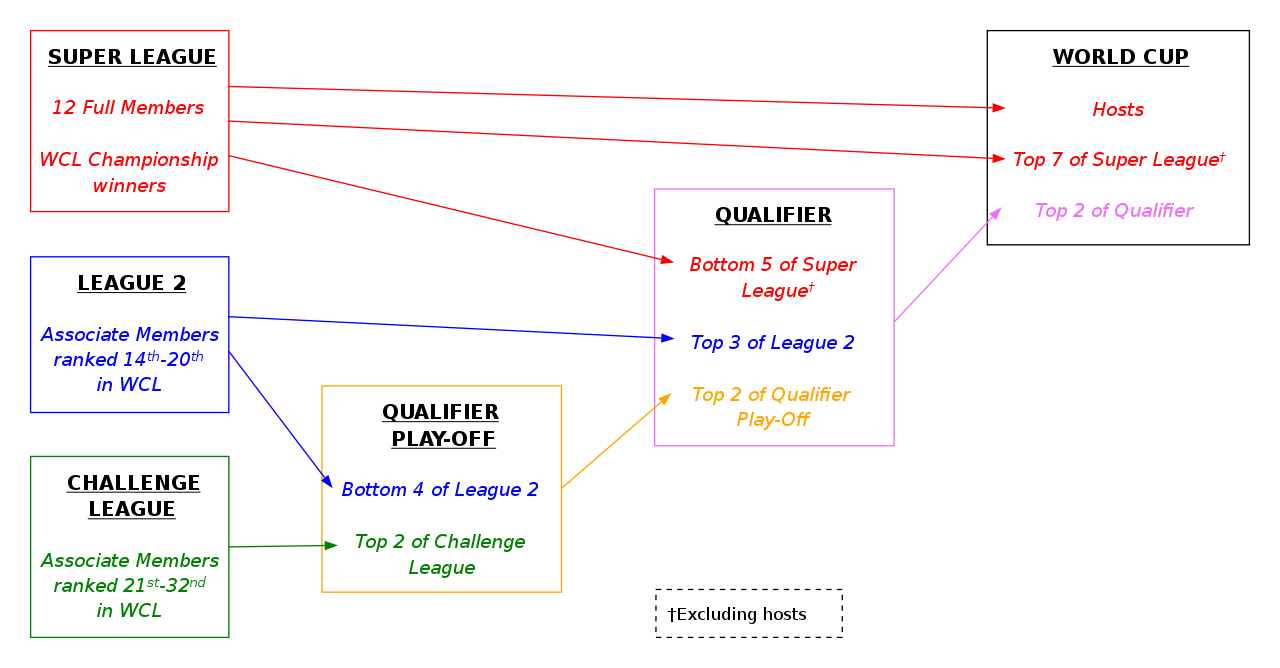
A diagram that explains the qualification structure for the 2023 ICC Cricket World Cup.

Team	Mode of qualification
Nepal	Existing ODI status
Scotland	Existing ODI status
United Arab Emirates	Existing ODI status
Namibia	Promoted from 2019 ICC World Cricket League Division Two
Oman	Promoted from 2019 ICC World Cricket League Division Two
Papua New Guinea	Promoted from 2019 ICC World Cricket League Division Two
United States	Promoted from 2019 ICC World Cricket League Division Two

The top three teams in the ICC Cricket World Cup League 2 qualified for the World Cup Qualifier while the bottom four went to the Qualifier Play-off.

== Fixtures ==
The International Cricket Council (ICC) confirmed the following schedule of fixtures. In December 2020, the ICC announced a revised schedule following the disruption caused by the COVID-19 pandemic. In March 2022, the ICC issued a further update for rounds 9 to 15, with those rounds scheduled to take place from March to August 2022.

Round	Date	Host team	2nd team	3rd team	Notes
1	August 2019	Scotland	Oman	Papua New Guinea	
2	September 2019	United States	Papua New Guinea	Namibia	
3	December 2019	United Arab Emirates	Scotland	United States	
4	January 2020	Oman	Namibia	United Arab Emirates	The final two matches were postponed to round 8 following the death of Qaboos bin Said.
5	February 2020	Nepal	United States	Oman	
6	September 2021	Oman	United States	Nepal	Originally scheduled for January 2021; postponed due to the COVID-19 pandemic.
7	September 2021	Oman	Scotland	Papua New Guinea	Originally scheduled for January 2022.
8	November 2021	Namibia	Oman	United Arab Emirates	Originally scheduled for August 2021; postponed due to the COVID-19 pandemic. Included the two matches postponed from round 4. However, only two matches were played before the remaining matches were postponed due to the COVID-19 pandemic.
N/A	February 2022	Oman	United Arab Emirates	N/A	Arranged to make up for matches postponed during round 4 and round 8.
9	March 2022	United Arab Emirates	Namibia	Oman	Originally scheduled for December 2020; postponed due to the COVID-19 pandemic. Included one match postponed from round 4.
10	March 2022	United Arab Emirates	Papua New Guinea	Nepal	Originally scheduled for January 2022.
11	April 2022	Papua New Guinea	Oman	Scotland	Originally scheduled for April 2021; postponed due to the COVID-19 pandemic. Later moved from Papua New Guinea to the UAE.
12	May 2022	United States	Scotland	United Arab Emirates	Originally scheduled for March 2020; postponed due to the COVID-19 pandemic.
13	June 2022	United States	Nepal	Oman	Originally scheduled for August 2021; postponed due to the COVID-19 pandemic.
14	July 2022	Scotland	Nepal	Namibia	Originally scheduled for July 2020; postponed due to the COVID-19 pandemic.
15	August 2022	Scotland	United Arab Emirates	United States	Originally scheduled for June 2021; postponed due to the COVID-19 pandemic.
16	September 2022	Papua New Guinea	Namibia	United States	Originally scheduled for September 2021; postponed due to the COVID-19 pandemic.
17	November 2022	Namibia	Papua New Guinea	United States	Originally scheduled for September 2020; postponed due to the COVID-19 pandemic.
18	December 2022	Namibia	Nepal	Scotland	Originally scheduled for April 2020; postponed due to the COVID-19 pandemic.
19	February 2023	Nepal	Namibia	Scotland	
N/A	February 2023	United Arab Emirates	Namibia	N/A	Arranged to make up for matches postponed during round 8.
20	February 2023	United Arab Emirates	Nepal	Papua New Guinea	This was the second tri-series between these sides to be hosted by the UAE (Papua New Guinea did not host a tri-series).
21	March 2023	Nepal	Papua New Guinea	United Arab Emirates	

As originally planned, each team would host three tri-series, each time joined by a different two of the other six teams. Each tri-series would comprise six matches (two between each pair of teams). Therefore, over the course of the whole tournament, each team would play each other team twice at home, twice away, and twice at a neutral venue. Some matches had to be rescheduled for different times and venues (see below), so this original schedule did not happen fully as planned, but each team did play a total of six fixtures against each other team.

=== Alterations ===
Two of Oman's home matches were cancelled during round 4, and they were ultimately played as part of a home bilateral series (against the UAE in February 2022) and as an additional game (against Namibia) in round 9 in the UAE.

On 13 March 2020, round 6, scheduled to take place in Lauderhill, Florida in April 2020, was postponed due to the COVID-19 pandemic and travel restrictions to the United States. On 24 March 2020, the ICC also confirmed that rounds 7 and 8, scheduled to take place in Namibia and Papua New Guinea respectively, had also been postponed. Round 9, scheduled to take place in Scotland in July 2020, was postponed on 10 June 2020. Round 10, scheduled to take place in Namibia in September 2020, was postponed on 23 July 2020.

In February 2021, the ICC confirmed that (newly numbered) rounds 6, 7, and 8 of their updated schedule had also been postponed. Round 6 was scheduled to take place in Oman, with rounds 7 and 8 originally scheduled to be played in Papua New Guinea. Round 8 was rescheduled to take place in Namibia during November and December 2021. However, only two matches were played before the remaining fixtures were postponed due to the discovery of a new variant of COVID-19 in Southern Africa.

In February 2022, Oman and the UAE played a three-match bilateral series in Oman to make up for games that had been postponed during the earlier tri-series in Oman and Namibia. In April 2022, Papua New Guinea's home tri-series against Oman and Scotland (round 11) was played in the UAE. In February 2023, the UAE hosted Namibia for a two-match bilateral series to make up for games that had been postponed during round 8 in Namibia. The UAE hosted two tri-series against Nepal and Papua New Guinea (rounds 10 and 20), including one that would originally have been played in Papua New Guinea.

== Results ==
Results from the home and away matches are as follows:

Home \ Away	(Namibia)	(Nepal)	(Oman)	(Papua New Guinea)	(Scotland)	(United Arab Emirates)	(United States)
Namibia	—	1–0 [2]	1–1 [2]	2–0 [2]	1–1 [2]	—^{1}	1–1 [2]
Nepal	2–0 [2]	—	0–2 [2]	2–0 [2]	2–0 [2]	2–0 [2]	2–0 [2]
Oman	0–1 [1]	1–1 [2]	—	2–0 [2]	0–1 [2]	1–2 [4]^{2}	2–0 [2]
Papua New Guinea	0–2 [2]	—^{3}	0–2 [2]^{4}	—	0–2 [2]^{4}	—^{3}	1–0 [2]
Scotland	2–0 [2]	1–1 [2]	1–1 [2]	2–0 [2]	—	2–0 [2]	1–1 [2]
United Arab Emirates	3–1 [4]^{1}	3–1 [4]^{3}	0–2 [2]	1–3 [4]^{3}	1–0 [2]	—	0–2 [2]
United States	1–1 [2]	1–0 [2]	1–1 [2]	2–0 [2]	1–1 [2]	1–1 [2]	—

The numbers in square brackets are the numbers of matches played.
^{1}Namibia's designated home matches against the UAE were played in the UAE.
^{2}The neutral venue matches between Oman and the UAE were played in Oman.
^{3}Papua New Guinea's designated home matches against Nepal and the UAE, and the neutral venue matches between Nepal and the UAE, were played in the UAE.
^{4}Papua New Guinea's designated home matches against Oman and Scotland were played at a neutral venue (the UAE).
Legend: Blue = home team win; Yellow = draw; Red = away team win.

Results from the neutral venue matches are as follows:

Team 1 \ Team 2	(Namibia)	(Nepal)	(Oman)	(Papua New Guinea)	(Scotland)	(United Arab Emirates)	(United States)
Namibia	—	2–0 [2]	2–1 [3]	2–0 [2]	0–2 [2]	0–2 [2]	2–0 [2]
Nepal	—	—	1–1 [2]	4–0 [4]^{3}	0–2 [2]	—^{3}	1–1 [2]
Oman	—	—	—	2–0 [2]	0–2 [2]	—^{2}	2–0 [2]
Papua New Guinea	—	—	—	—	0–2 [2]	1–1 [2]	0–2 [2]
Scotland	—	—	—	—	—	1–1 [2]	1–1 [2]
United Arab Emirates	—	—	—	—	—	—	0–1 [2]
United States	—	—	—	—	—	—	—

The numbers in square brackets are the numbers of matches played.
^{1}Namibia's designated home matches against the UAE were played in the UAE.
^{2}The neutral venue matches between Oman and the UAE were played in Oman.
^{3}Papua New Guinea's designated home matches against Nepal and the UAE, and the neutral venue matches between Nepal and the UAE, were played in the UAE.
^{4}Papua New Guinea's designated home matches against Oman and Scotland were played at a neutral venue (the UAE).
Legend: Blue = left column team win; Yellow = draw; Red = top row team win.

== Points table ==
Pos	Team	Pld	W	L	T	NR	Pts	NRR	Qualification for
1	Scotland	36	24	10	0	2	50	0.647	2023 Cricket World Cup Qualifier
2	Oman	36	21	13	1	1	44	0.039	2023 Cricket World Cup Qualifier
3	Nepal	36	19	15	1	1	40	0.101	2023 Cricket World Cup Qualifier
4	Namibia	36	19	16	0	1	39	0.298	2023 Cricket World Cup Qualifier Play-off
5	United States	36	16	17	2	1	35	−0.040	2023 Cricket World Cup Qualifier Play-off
6	United Arab Emirates	36	15	18	1	2	33	−0.222	2023 Cricket World Cup Qualifier Play-off
7	Papua New Guinea	36	5	30	1	0	11	−0.792	2023 Cricket World Cup Qualifier Play-off

Source: ESPN Cricinfo

== Statistics ==
=== Most runs ===
Batsman	Mat	Inns	NO	Runs	Ave	Strike rate	HS	100s	50s
(Namibia) Gerhard Erasmus	34	33	3	1,298	43.26	77.91	121*	1	11
(Papua New Guinea) Assad Vala	36	36	1	1,290	36.85	70.37	104	1	6
(United States) Monank Patel	35	35	2	1,219	36.93	80.30	130	2	8
(United States) Aaron Jones	31	31	3	1,184	42.29	72.59	123*	1	8
(Oman) Jatinder Singh	36	35	1	1,098	32.29	77.92	118*	3	6
Source: ESPNcricinfo

=== Highest individual score ===
Batsman	Runs	Balls	4s	6s	Opposition	Ground	Match date
(Namibia) Jean-Pierre Kotze	136	109	11	8	United States	Lauderhill	20 September 2019
(Scotland) Calum MacLeod	133*	144	13	2	United States	Aberdeen	17 August 2022
(Namibia) Michael van Lingen	133	137	9	5	Nepal	Kathmandu	14 February 2023
(United States) Monank Patel	130	101	11	6	Oman	Pearland	8 June 2022
(Namibia) Craig Williams	129*	94	13	6	Oman	Muscat	8 January 2020
Source: ESPNcricinfo

=== Most wickets ===
Bowler	Mat	Inns	Wkts	Runs	Overs	BBI	Ave	Econ	SR	4WI	5WI
(Oman) Bilal Khan	35	35	76	1,419	298.4	5/31	18.67	4.75	23.5	3	3
(Nepal) Sandeep Lamichhane	31	30	72	1,142	282.0	6/16	15.86	4.04	23.5	5	2
(United States) Saurabh Netravalkar	35	34	58	1,234	298.3	5/32	21.27	4.13	30.8	1	2
(Scotland) Mark Watt	31	30	54	969	269.0	5/33	17.94	3.60	29.8	3	1
(Namibia) Ruben Trumpelmann	29	29	51	1,123	236.5	5/30	22.01	4.74	27.8	2	2
Source: ESPNcricinfo

=== Best bowling figures in an innings ===
Bowler	Wkts	Runs	Overs	Mdns	Econ	Opposition	Ground	Match date
(Nepal) Sandeep Lamichhane	6	16	6	1	2.66	United States	Kirtipur	12 February 2020
(Namibia) Tangeni Lungameni	6	42	9	0	4.66	Papua New Guinea	Windhoek	23 November 2022
(Oman) Khawar Ali	5	13	4.2	1	3.00	Papua New Guinea	Muscat	1 October 2021
(United Arab Emirates) Basil Hameed	5	17	6.2	0	2.68	Oman	Muscat	6 February 2022
(Papua New Guinea) Riley Hekure	5	20	8	1	2.50	United Arab Emirates	Dubai	5 March 2023
Source: ESPNcricinfo
