= Ali Naseer =

Emirati cricketer (born 2004)

Personal information
- Full name: Ali Aamer Naseer
- Born: 9 March 2004 (age 22); Karachi, Sindh, Pakistan
- Batting: Left-handed
- Bowling: Left-arm medium-fast
- Role: All-rounder

International information
- National side: United Arab Emirates (2023-present)
- ODI debut (cap 103): 4 June 2023 v West Indies
- Last ODI: 6 July 2023 v United States
- T20I debut (cap 64): 17 August 2023 v New Zealand
- Last T20I: 15 December 2024 v Oman
- Source: Cricinfo, 15 December 2024

Ali Aamer Naseer (born 9 March 2004) is a Pakistani-born cricketer who plays for the United Arab Emirates national cricket team. He is an all-rounder who bats left-handed and bowls left-arm fast-medium.

== Personal life ==
Naseer was born in Karachi, Pakistan. He moved to Dubai at the age of four and attended GEMS FirstPoint School. He moved to England to attend university, studying sports management at the University of Leeds.

== International career ==
Naseer attended the ICC Academy where he was coached by Mudassar Nazar. He represented the United Arab Emirates national under-19 cricket team at the 2020 Under-19 Cricket World Cup in South Africa, aged 15, and returned to the squad for the 2022 Under-19 Cricket World Cup in the West Indies. At the 2022 World Cup he scored 73 runs against Canada and 54 against England.

In May 2023, Naseer was named in the UAE senior squad for its home series against the West Indies. He made his One Day International (ODI) debut in the first match of the series, scoring half-centuries in his first two matches.

Naseer made his Twenty20 International debut for the UAE against New Zealand on 17 August 2023.

== Franchise career ==
In January 2023, Naseer was named in the Desert Vipers squad for the 2023 International League T20.
