= Afghan cricket team in the United Arab Emirates in 2022–23 =

International cricket tour

Afghan cricket team in the UAE in 2022–23
	United Arab Emirates	Afghanistan
- Dates: 16 – 19 February 2023
Captains	Chundangapoyil Rizwan	Rashid Khan

Twenty20 International series
- Results: Afghanistan won the 3-match series 2–1
Most runs	Muhammad Waseem (199)	Karim Janat (116)
Most wickets	Zahoor Khan (5)	Rashid Khan (4)

The Afghanistan men's cricket team toured the United Arab Emirates in February 2023 to play three Twenty20 International (T20I) matches. The dates for the tour were confirmed in January 2023. In November 2022, the Afghanistan Cricket Board signed a five-year agreement with the Emirates Cricket Board to play their home matches in the UAE. This was the first annual series between the two sides to be arranged as part of the agreement.

== Squads ==
United Arab Emirates	Afghanistan
Chundangapoyil Rizwan (c); Vriitya Aravind; Zawar Farid; Basil Hameed; Muhammad Jawadullah; Aayan Afzal Khan; Zahoor Khan; Karthik Meiyappan; Rohan Mustafa; Fahad Nawaz; Akif Raja; Alishan Sharafu; Sanchit Sharma; Junaid Siddique; Ansh Tandon; Muhammad Waseem	Rashid Khan (c); Fareed Ahmad; Noor Ahmad; Sharafuddin Ashraf; Fazalhaq Farooqi; Rahmanullah Gurbaz (wk); Karim Janat; Zahir Khan; Nijat Masood; Gulbadin Naib; Naveen-ul-Haq; Azmatullah Omarzai; Rahmat Shah; Mujeeb Ur Rahman; Ibrahim Zadran; Najibullah Zadran; Afsar Zazai; Hazratullah Zazai

On 28 January 2023, Afghanistan named a preliminary squad of 23 players for a training camp in the UAE.

== T20I series ==
=== 1st T20I ===
16 February 2023
18:00 (D/N)
Scorecard

United Arab Emirates; 142/5 (20 overs)	v	Afghanistan; 146/5 (19.1 overs)
Chundangapoyil Rizwan 48 (41); Rashid Khan 2/34 (4 overs)		Karim Janat 53 (38); Junaid Siddique 2/30 (4 overs)

Afghanistan won by 5 wickets
Sheikh Zayed Cricket Stadium, Abu Dhabi
Umpires: Akbar Ali (UAE) and Aasif Iqbal (UAE)
Player of the match: Karim Janat (Afg)

- Afghanistan won the toss and elected to field.
- Muhammad Jawadullah (UAE) made his T20I debut.

=== 2nd T20I ===
18 February 2023
18:00 (D/N)
Scorecard

Afghanistan; 137/6 (20 overs)	v	United Arab Emirates; 138/1 (18.2 overs)
Najibullah Zadran 37* (29); Zahoor Khan 2/25 (4 overs)		Muhammad Waseem 91 (50); Karim Janat 1/13 (2 overs)

United Arab Emirates won by 9 wickets
Sheikh Zayed Cricket Stadium, Abu Dhabi
Umpires: Akbar Ali (UAE) and Shiju Sam (UAE)
Player of the match: Muhammad Waseem (UAE)

- Afghanistan won the toss and elected to bat.

=== 3rd T20I ===
19 February 2023
18:00 (D/N)
Scorecard

United Arab Emirates; 163/6 (20 overs)	v	Afghanistan; 166/4 (19.1 overs)
Muhammad Waseem 75 (50); Gulbadin Naib 2/13 (2 overs)		Ibrahim Zadran 60* (51); Zahoor Khan 2/28 (4 overs)

Afghanistan won by 6 wickets
Sheikh Zayed Cricket Stadium, Abu Dhabi
Umpires: Aasif Iqbal (UAE) and Shiju Sam (UAE)
Player of the match: Karim Janat (Afg)

- Afghanistan won the toss and elected to field.
- Zahir Khan (Afg) made his T20I debut.
