= Lovepreet Singh (cricketer) =

Emirati cricketer

Personal information
- Born: 5 December 2002 (age 23); Jalandhar, Punjab, India
- Batting: Right-handed
- Bowling: Right-arm leg spin
- Role: Batsman

International information
- National side: United Arab Emirates (2023-present)
- ODI debut (cap 105): 6 June 2023 v West Indies
- Last ODI: 9 June 2023 v West Indies
- Source: ESPNcricinfo, 9 June 2023

Lovepreet Singh (born 5 December 2002) is a cricketer who plays for the United Arab Emirates national cricket team. He is a right-handed batsman and right-arm leg spin bowler.

== Personal life ==
Singh was born on 5 December 2002 in Jalandhar, in Punjab, India. He moved to the UAE with his family at the age of three, after his father secured work in Fujairah. The family settled in Al Dhaid and he grew up playing tape ball cricket in the streets.

== Career ==
Singh attended the Goltay Cricket Academy in Dubai where he was coached by Shahzad Altaf. After impressing with the bat in a 50-over tournament in Ajman, in May 2023 he was named in the UAE national squad for an ODI series against the West Indies. He is the first Sikh to play international cricket for the UAE.

Singh made his One Day International (ODI) debut against the West Indies on 7 June 2023.
