= Muhammad Jawadullah =

Emirati cricketer

Personal information
- Born: 12 March 1999 (age 27); Mardan, Khyber Pakhtunkhwa, Pakistan
- Batting: Left-handed
- Bowling: Left-arm fast-medium
- Role: Bowler

International information
- National side: United Arab Emirates
- ODI debut (cap 106): 9 June 2023 v West Indies
- Last ODI: 20 September 2024 v Namibia
- ODI shirt no.: 6
- T20I debut (cap 63): 16 February 2023 v Afghanistan
- Last T20I: 21 December 2024 v kuwait
- T20I shirt no.: 6

Career statistics
Competition	ODI	T20I	LA	T20
Matches	7	31	9	45
Runs scored	14	14	24	15
Batting average	7.00	14.00	12.00	5.00
100s/50s	0/0	0/0	0/0	0/0
Top score	13*	13*	13*	13*
Balls bowled	272	703	341	918
Wickets	7	47	10	61
Bowling average	43.14	18.72	38.90	19.50
5 wickets in innings	0	0	0	0
10 wickets in match	0	0	0	0
Best bowling	3/46	4/26	3/46	4/26
Catches/stumpings	1/–	5/–	1/–	8/–
- Source: Cricinfo, 20 March 2025

Muhammad Jawadullah (born 12 March 1999) is a Pakistani-born cricketer who plays for the United Arab Emirates national cricket team. He is a left-arm fast bowler.

== Personal life ==
Jawadullah grew up near Mardan in Khyber Pakhtunkhwa, Pakistan. He moved to the UAE in 2019 to work as an electrician at a shooting club in Al Ain.

== Career ==
In February 2023, he was selected in the UAE Twenty20 International (T20I) squad for their series against Afghanistan. He made his T20I debut against Afghanistan on 16 February 2023.

Prior to making his debut for UAE, Jawadullah represented the Sharjah Warriors in the inaugural 2022–23 International League T20.

In May 2023, he was named in UAE's One Day International (ODI) squad for their series against West Indies. He made his ODI debut in the third ODI of the series, on 9 June 2023.

In January 2026, Jawadullah was named in UAE's squad for the 2026 T20 World Cup.
