= Riley Hekure =

Papua New Guinean cricketer (born 1994)

Personal information
- Born: 31 October 1994 (age 32)

International information
- National side: Papua New Guinea (2019-present)
- ODI debut (cap 25): 23 September 2019 v Namibia
- Last ODI: 15 March 2023 v United Arab Emirates
- T20I debut (cap 24): 19 October 2019 v Bermuda
- Last T20I: 17 July 2022 v USA
- Source: Cricinfo, 16 March 2023

Riley Hekure (born 31 October 1994) is a Papua New Guinean cricketer. In September 2019, he was named in Papua New Guinea's One Day International (ODI) squad for the 2019 United States Tri-Nation Series. He made his ODI debut against Namibia, on 23 September 2019. Prior to his ODI debut, he was named in Papua New Guinea's squad for the 2014 Under-19 Cricket World Cup.

He was part of Papua New Guinea's squad for the 2019 ICC T20 World Cup Qualifier tournament in the United Arab Emirates. He made his Twenty20 International (T20I) debut for Papua New Guinea, against Bermuda, on 19 October 2019.
