= Asif Khan (Emirati cricketer) =

Pakistan-born Emirati cricketer

Personal information
- Born: 15 February 1990 (age 36); Lahore, Punjab, Pakistan
- Batting: Right handed
- Role: Batsman

International information
- National side: United Arab Emirates
- ODI debut (cap 91): 5 March 2022 v Oman
- Last ODI: 4 June 2023 v West Indies
- T20I debut (cap 65): 17 August 2023 v New Zealand
- Last T20I: 3 November 2023 v Nepal

Career statistics
Competition	ODI
Matches	26
Runs scored	997
Batting average	38.34
100s/50s	3/5
Top score	151*
Catches/stumpings	6/0
- Source: Cricinfo, 10 July 2023

Asif Khan (born 15 February 1990) is a Pakistani cricketer who currently represents the United Arab Emirates in international cricket. Between 2007 and 2014, Asif played domestic cricket in Pakistan, including 32 first-class matches for Lahore.

A right-handed batsman, Asif moved to the UAE in 2017 with the aim to be selected for the national cricket team once he became eligible based on his residency in the country.

In March 2022, he was named in the UAE's One Day International (ODI) squad for the 2022 United Arab Emirates Tri-Nation Series tournament, his maiden call-up to the national side. He made his ODI debut on 5 March 2022, against Oman.

On 16 March 2023, in a match against Nepal, Khan scored his first century (101*) in ODIs, off just 41 balls, which was the quickest hundred by a player from an associate nation, and fourth quickest overall in an ODI. The same month, he brought up his second ODI century, a career-best 103 runs off 84 balls, against the United States in the 2023 Cricket World Cup Qualifier Play-off.
