= Muhammad Waseem (cricketer) =

Emirati cricketer

Personal information
- Born: 12 February 1996 (age 30); Mian Channu, Punjab, Pakistan
- Batting: Right-handed
- Bowling: Right-arm medium
- Role: Opening Batter

International information
- National side: United Arab Emirates
- ODI debut (cap 89): 5 February 2022 v Oman
- Last ODI: 3 May 2026 v Oman
- ODI shirt no.: 10
- T20I debut (cap 55): 5 October 2021 v Namibia
- Last T20I: 21 April 2026 v Nepal
- T20I shirt no.: 10

Domestic team information
- Years: Team
- 2024-present: MI Emirates
- 2024: Chattogram Challengers
- 2026: Rajshahi Warriors
- 2026: Karachi Kings
- 2026: Dublin Guardians

Career statistics
Competition	ODI	T20I	LA	T20
Matches	69	99	69	155
Runs scored	1,745	3,371	1,745	4,713
Batting average	25.28	36.24	25.28	32.72
100s/50s	1/9	3/26	1/9	3/32
Top score	119	112	119	112
Balls bowled	71	76	71	76
Wickets	0	5	0	5
Bowling average	–	28.20	–	28.20
5 wickets in innings	–	0	–	0
10 wickets in match	–	0	–	0
Best bowling	–	2/13	–	2/13
Catches/stumpings	33/–	76/–	33/–	108/–
- Source: ESPNcricinfo, 25 September 2026

Muhammad Waseem (born 12 February 1996) is a Pakistani-born cricketer who plays for the United Arab Emirates national cricket team. He is also the current captain of the T20I side of the UAE and the highest ranked batter of the nation in ICC T20 Ranking.

== Personal life ==
Waseem was born in Pakistan, growing up in the Punjab's city of Mian Channu. His nickname is Babba. He qualified to play for the UAE in April 2021 by meeting the ICC's three-year residency requirement.

== Franchise career ==
On 3 February 2021, in the 2021 T10 League, Waseem equalled the record for the fastest fifty in a T10 cricket match, doing so in 12 balls. In May 2021, he was called into the Multan Sultans squad as a replacement player for the 2021 Pakistan Super League. In September 2023, he was picked by the Chattogram Challengers following the players' draft to play for them in the 2024 Bangladesh Premier League.

== International career ==
In October 2021, Waseem was named in the UAE's Twenty20 International (T20I) squad for the 2021 Summer T20 Bash tournament. He made his T20I debut on 5 October 2021, for the UAE against Namibia. Five days later, in the UAE's match against Ireland, Waseem scored his first century in T20I cricket, with 107 not out from 62 balls.

In November 2021, he was named in the UAE's One Day International (ODI) squad for the 2021 Namibia Tri-Nation Series. In February 2022, he was also named in the UAE's ODI squad for their series against Oman. He made his ODI debut on 5 February 2022 against Oman.

Waseem was appointed captain of the UAE in March 2023, replacing CP Rizwan for the final match of the 2023 United Arab Emirates Tri-Nation Series. His first full series was the Nepal Tri-Nation Series which was UAE's final series of the 2019–2023 ICC Cricket World Cup League 2. Waseem scored his maiden ODI century against Papua New Guinea in the Nepal series, scoring 119 from 76 balls including twelve sixes. His century came from 61 balls and set a new UAE record for the fastest ODI century, but was surpassed the following day by Asif Khan's 41-ball century.

In January 2026, Waseem was named as the captain of UAE's squad for the 2026 T20 World Cup.
