= Cricket in Afghanistan =

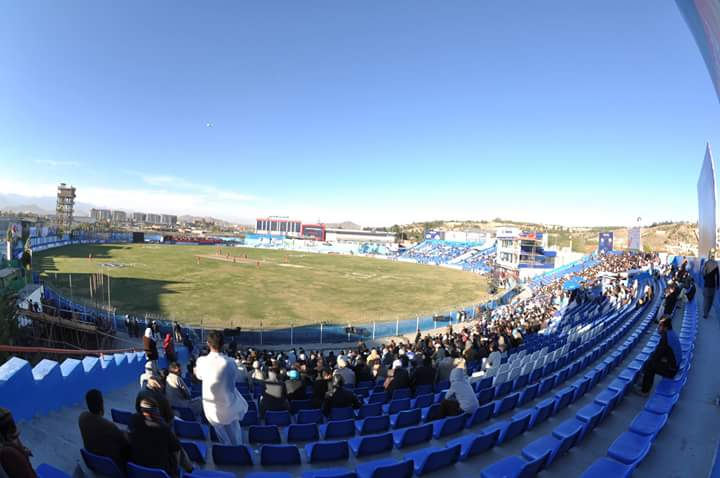
- Crowd watching a cricket tournament in 2015
- Country: Afghanistan
- Governing body: Afghanistan Cricket Board
- National teams: Afghanistan Men; Afghanistan Women; Afghanistan U-19 Men; Afghanistan A

National competitions
- List: First Class Cricket; Ahmad Shah Abdali 4-day Tournament; Mirwais Nika 3-Day Tournament; List A Cricket; Ghazi Amanullah Khan Regional One Day Tournament; Green Afghanistan One Day Cup; T20 Cricket; Shpageeza Cricket League; Qosh Tepa National T20 Cup

International competitions
- List: Men’s national team; ICC World Test Championship; Cricket World Cup: 6th (2023); ICC World Twenty20: Semi-final (2024); ICC Champions Trophy; Asia Cup; Asian Games: Silver Medal (2010, 2014, 2022); Men’s U-19 national team; Under-19 Cricket World Cup: 4th (2022); ACC Under-19 Asia Cup: Champions (2017); Afghanistan A cricket team; ACC Emerging Teams Asia Cup: Champions (2024)

Cricket in Afghanistan is a popular sport in the country, which is represented internationally by the Afghanistan national cricket team. Afghanistan became a full member of the International Cricket Council (ICC) on 22 June 2017, enabling the national team to participate in official Test matches. Today, cricket is one of the most popular sports in Afghanistan, and the Afghanistan team has made quick progress in the international world of cricket.

Afghanistan's playing season runs from May to September. There are 320 cricket clubs and 6 turf wickets in Afghanistan. In February 2017, the ICC awarded first-class status to Afghanistan's four-day domestic competition. They also granted List A status to their existing Twenty20 domestic competition, as Afghanistan did not have a domestic 50-over tournament. In May 2017 however, the ICC recognised the 50-over Ghazi Amanullah Khan Regional One Day Tournament by granting it List A status.

== History ==
Cricket was first played in Afghanistan during the 19th century Anglo-Afghan Wars, with British troops reported to have played in Kabul in 1839. However, unlike many countries, no lasting cricket legacy was left by the British, and it would be more than a hundred years before cricket returned.

Afghanistan's border with the Test playing nation of Pakistan has helped the game to take root. In the 1990s, cricket became popular amongst Afghan refugees in Pakistan, and the Afghanistan Cricket Federation was formed there in 1995. They continued to play cricket on their return to their home country in late 2001. Like all sports, cricket was originally banned by the Taliban, but it became an exception in 2000, and the Afghanistan Cricket Federation was elected as an affiliate member of the ICC the following year.

The Afghanistan national cricket team's 21-run win over Namibia in Krugersdorp earned them official One Day International status in April 2009. The team qualified for the 2012 ICC Under-19 Cricket World Cup.

== Administration ==
Afghanistan Cricket Board (ACB) is the official governing body of the sport of cricket in Afghanistan. Its current headquarters is in Kabul, Afghanistan. The Afghanistan Cricket Board is Afghanistan's representative at the International Cricket Council and was an associate member of ICC from June 2013 to 2017. Now, it is one of the full members of ICC since 2017. It is also a member of the Asian Cricket Council.

== National teams ==
National teams of Afghanistan
- Afghanistan (Men's): Afghanistan (Women's)
- Afghanistan U-19 (Men's): Afghanistan A

The Afghanistan national cricket team is governed by the Afghanistan Cricket Board (ACB) and is a member of the Asian Cricket Council (ACC). Since 2017, the ACB has been affiliated with ICC, the international governing body for world cricket. In 1910, the ACB became one of the members of the ACC.

=== Performance ===
The following list includes the performance of all of Afghanistan's national teams at major competitions.

==== Men's senior team ====
The Afghanistan national cricket team represents the country of Afghanistan in international cricket matches. The national team was formed in 1910, immediately after took part in Pakistan domestic circuit after being invited in 2001, which played in the 2009 World Cup Qualifier after rising rapidly through the World Cricket League, starting in Division Five in May 2008. They play in the Elite division of the ACC Trophy.

Afghanistan's 21-run win over Namibia in Krugersdorp earned them official One Day International status. Afghanistan won their first One Day International against Scotland. In 2011, the team qualified for the 2012 ICC Under-19 Cricket World Cup.

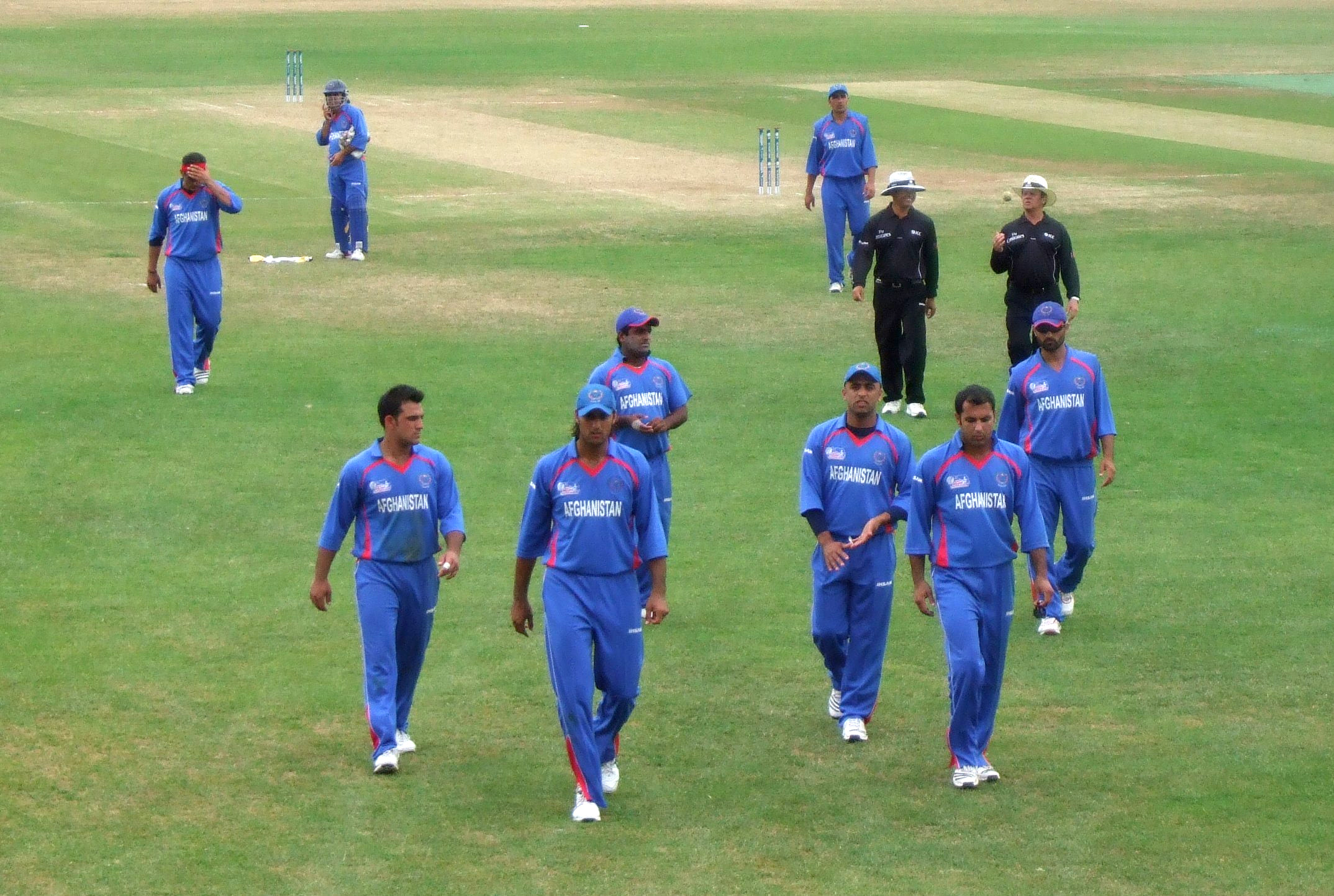
The Afghanistan national cricket team at the 2010 ICC WCL Division One in Rotterdam, Netherlands

Tournament	Appearance in finals	Last appearance	Best performance
ICC Men's Cricket World Cup	0 out of 13	2023	6th (2023)
ICC Men's T20 World Cup	0 out of 9	2024	Semi-final (2024)
ICC Champions Trophy	0 out of 8	-	-
Men's T20 World Cup Qualifier	3 out of 7	2015	Champions (2010)
Asia Cup	0 out of 16	2023	Group Stage (2018, 2022, 2023)
Asian Games	3 out of 3	2022	Finals (2010, 2014, 2022)
ACC Twenty20 Cup	4 out of 5	2013	Champions (2007, 2009, 2011, 2013)

==== Women's senior team ====
The Afghanistan national women's cricket team is the team that represents the country of Afghanistan in international women's cricket matches. The team was formed in 2010, drawing on players mostly from Kabul. Although the team is yet to play representative cricket, it had been scheduled to take part in the 2011 ACC Women’s Twenty20 in Kuwait, which ran from 17 – 25 February. The team was forced to withdraw from the tournament before travelling to Kuwait due to elements in Afghanistan opposing women's participation in sport After the Taliban takeover of Afghanistan after the Fall of Kabul of 2021, women were banned from cricket and members of the national team were exiled.

==== Men's U-19 team ====
Afghanistan national under-19 cricket team represents the country of Afghanistan in U-19 international cricket.

Afghanistan finished second in the 2009 Under-19 Cricket World Cup Qualifier which was held in Canada. The team gained victories over the under-19 teams of Sierra Leone, Hong Kong, Vanuatu, the United States, Uganda, the Netherlands, Papua New Guinea. The team lost just two matches to Ireland and Canada. Afghanistan have finished fourth in 2011 Under-19 Cricket World Cup Qualifier which gained them qualification to 2012 Under-19 Cricket World Cup.

Tournament	Appearance in finals	Last appearance	Best performance
ICC Under-19 Cricket World Cup	0 out of 15	2024	4th (2018, 2022)
ACC Under-19 Asia Cup	1 out of 11	2024	Champions (2017)

==== Afghanistan A team ====
Tournament	Appearance in finals	Last appearance	Best performance
ACC Emerging Teams Asia Cup	1 out of 6	2024	Champions (2024)

== Affiliated Province Cricket Associations ==
There are currently 34 provincial cricket associations affiliated with ACB

=== Regional domestic teams ===
Provinces of Regional Cricket Teams in Afghanistan Amo (Navy) Band-e-Amir (Green) Boost (Orange) Kabul (blue) Mis Ainak (Brown) Speen Ghar (Grey)

- Region: Amo
  - Balkh Province
  - Kunduz Province
  - Badakhshan Province
  - Takhar Province
  - Baghlan Province
  - Samangan Province
  - Sar-e Pol Province
  - Jowzjan Province
  - Faryab Province
- Region: Band-e-Amir
  - Ghazni Province
  - Bamyan Province
  - Parwan Province
  - Panjshir Province
  - Daykundi Province
  - Maidan Wardak Province
- Region: Boost
  - Kandahar Province
  - Helmand Province
  - Herat Province
  - Farah Province
  - Ghor Province
  - Badghis Province
  - Urozgan Province
  - Nimruz Province
  - Zabul Province
- Region: Mis Ainak
  - Khost Province
  - Logar Province
  - Paktia Province
  - Paktika Province
- Region: Spin Ghar
  - Nangarhar Province
  - Laghman Province
  - Kapisa Province
  - Kunar Province
  - Nuristan Province
- Region: Kabul

== Organisation of cricket in modern Afghanistan ==
=== International cricket ===
==== Men's National Team ====
The Afghanistan national cricket team represents Afghanistan in international cricket matches.

Afghanistan have been participating in international cricket since 2001 and competed in international tournament since 2004. They have competed in numerous tournaments over the years including the ACC tournaments. The Afghanistan national cricket team has also provided some of the greatest players to the world, the biggest example of which is Rashid Khan. The Afghanistan men's national team is currently ranked No. 11th in Tests, No. 8th in ODIs and at 10th position in T20Is. Afghanistan best performance in World Cup was the latest 2023 world cup under the captaincy of Hashmatullah Shahidi.

- Test International- Afghanistan made their debut as a Test playing nation in 2018 against India. In past time, Afghanistan rarely play test and won it. But in recent years they are playing more test matches and winning it to.
- One Day International- -Afghanistan played their first ODI International in 2009 against Scotland. They were not able to participate in first edition of Cricket World Cup. But from 2015 Cricket World Cup they have been continuisly participating and improving in every upcoming world cup
- T20 International- Afghanistan played their first T20 International in 2010 against Ireland. Afghanistan have made great impact in T20 international from their early day of this format. They have been in semis of recent 2024 Men's T20 World Cup.

=== Domestic Cricket ===
==== First Class competition ====
- Ahmad Shah Abdali 4-day Tournament
- Mirwais Nika 3-Day Tournament

==== Limited overs competitions ====
- Ghazi Amanullah Khan Regional One Day Tournament
- Green Afghanistan One Day Cup

==== Twenty20 competitions ====
- Shpageeza Cricket League
- Qosh Tepa National T20 Cup

Afghanistan's domestic structure originally consisted of a 25-over Inter-Provincial Tournament, which had the participation of 22 provinces in the tournament. The aim of the tournament was to spread the game across the country and to generate a greater depth of talent for the national team to select from. The best players from the tournament were selected players for Afghanistan A and under-19 teams based on their performance and would be sent for training and coaching to Bangladesh.

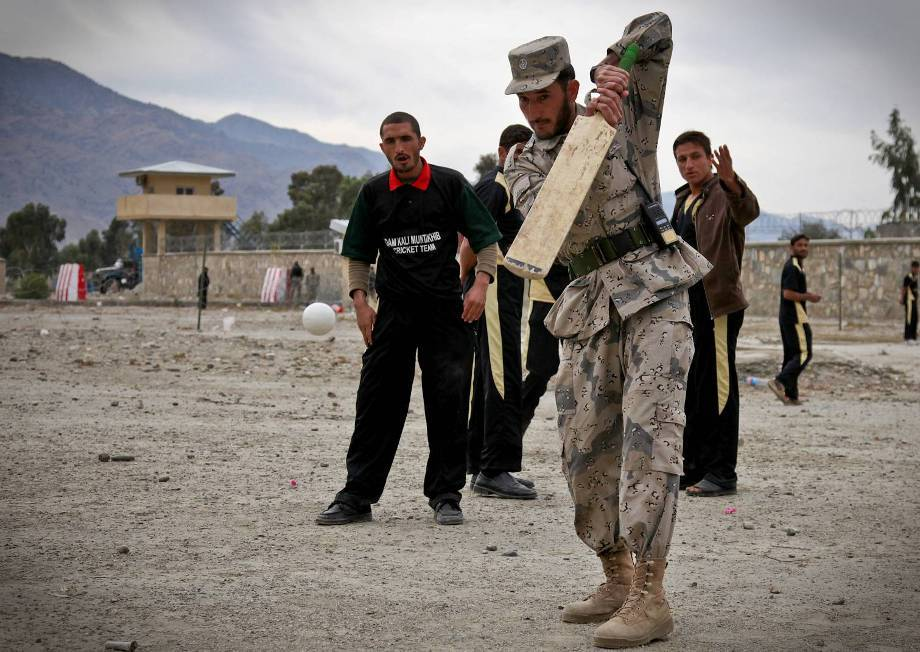
A member of the Afghan Border Police plays cricket after the ground breaking ceremony for the Ghulam Mohammad Sports Complex in Kunar Province.

The top two teams from the 12-team first round advanced to the next round. The top six from the tournament then contested a 50 over tournament in Kabul. The 50 over tournament in May 2010 was won by Kabul Province.

Starting in 2011, Afghanistan's domestic cricket structure has grown. The expanded Inter-Provincial Tournament was reorganized into a 50 over tournament and divided into a Challenge Cup section (the Etisalat ODN Challenge Cup with 20 provincial teams) and an Elite Cup section (with 12 provincial teams; 4 of them qualifiers from the Challenge Cup section). In addition to the Inter-Provincial cricket the Afghanistan Cricket Board (ACB) has divided the provinces of Afghanistan in to 5 Cricket Regions to enable the better management of the game. The Regions are Amo in the north (centered on Balkh), Spin Ghar in the east (centered on Nangarhar), Band-e-Amir in the centre (centered on Kabul), Mis Ainak in the southeast (centered on Khost) and Boost in the west and southwest (centered on Kandahar). The 5 regions in turn have representative teams which play in all traditional 3 formats of cricket.

In addition to an expansion of the inter-provincial tournament from 25-over matches to 50-over matches and the addition of the T-20 and multi-day formats, cricket in Afghanistan has now expanded across the provinces as well; 32 of the 34 provinces now have representative sides. All provinces except Daykundi and Farah have a representative team, while the ACB recognizes Afghan Refugees and Koochian (Nomads) as provincial teams. The three-day league competition was expanded into a four-day league in 2014-15. Additionally a two-day inter-provincial league competition was held in 2016.

The UAE-based telecommunications company, Etisalat is now one of the main sponsors of Afghanistan's cricket, including being then title sponsor in Afghanistan's division 2 inter-provincinal challenge cup and the Etisalat Sixes T20 Tournament.

Starting from the 2017 season, Afghanistan has a four-day first-class competition (Ahmad Shah Abdali 4-day Tournament), a 50-over List A competition (Ghazi Amanullah Khan Regional One Day Tournament) and a recognized Twenty20 league (Shpageeza Cricket League). In 2019, an additional 3-day first-class event (Mirwais Nika Provincial 3-Day) and a List A event (Afghanistan Provincial Challenge Cup) were launched for individual provinces to compete in. Subsequent editions of the Mirwais Nika 3-Day tournament in 2022, 2023, 2024, and 2025 were not awarded first-class status and had been converted from a provincial competition into a regional competition.

In March 2024, the ACB launched a new T20 cricket competition named Qosh Tepa National T20 Cup involving regional teams, with the first edition taking place in April 2024.

== Stadiums ==
=== Active stadiums ===
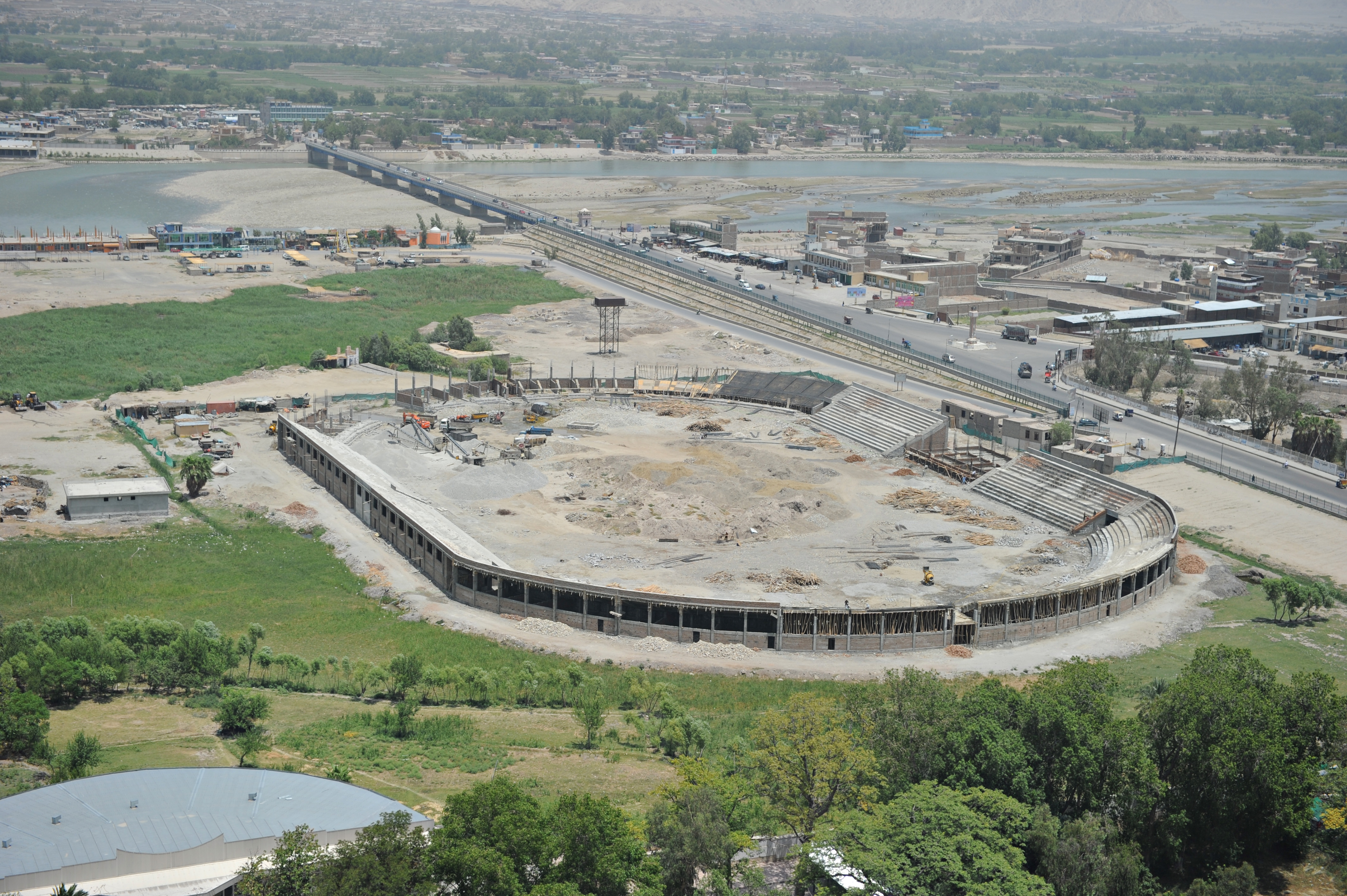
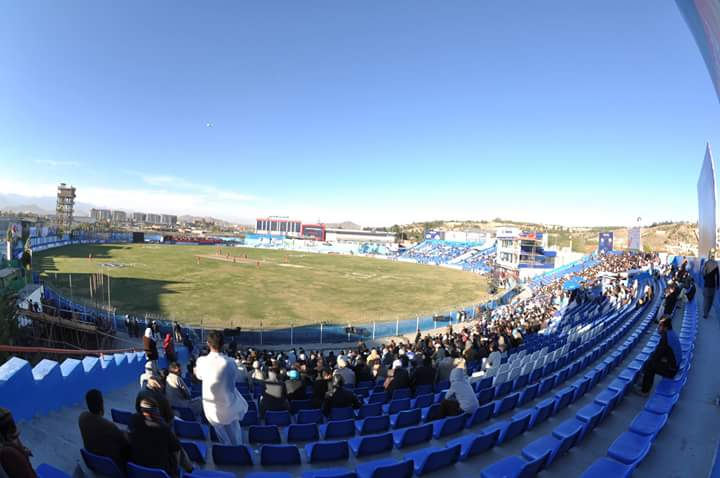
Stadium	Location	Capacity	Notes	Image
Ghazi Amanullah International Cricket Stadium	Ghazi Amanullah Town, Nangarhar Province	14,000
Kandahar International Cricket Stadium	Kandahar	9,000
Khost Cricket Stadium	Khost	8,000
Helmand Cricket Stadium	Lashkar Gah, Helmand	8,000
Sherzai Cricket Stadium	Jalalabad, Nangarhar	8,000
Laghman Cricket Stadium	Mihtarlam, Laghman	7,000
Kabul International Cricket Stadium	Kabul	6,000
Paktia Cricket Stadium	Gardez, Paktia	6,000

== Performance By Afghanistan national team in International competitions ==
Key
Champions
Runners-up
3rd position

=== Men's team ===
==== ICC Cricket World Cup ====
Year	Round	Played	Won	Tied	Lost	Captain
(England) 1975	Not eligible – not an ICC Member					
(England) 1979	Not eligible – not an ICC Member					
(England) 1983	Not eligible – not an ICC Member					
(India) (Pakistan) 1987	Not eligible – not an ICC Member					
(Australia) (New Zealand) 1992	Not eligible – not an ICC Member					
(India) (Pakistan) (Sri Lanka) 1996	Not eligible – not an ICC Member					
(England) (Scotland) (Republic of Ireland) (Netherlands) 1999	Not eligible – not an ICC Member					
(South Africa) (Zimbabwe) (Kenya) 2003	Not an ICC Member at time of qualifying					
(Cricket West Indies) 2007	Did not qualify					
(India) (Bangladesh) (Sri Lanka) 2011	Did not qualify					
(Australia) (New Zealand) 2015	Group stage	6	1	0	5	Mohammad Nabi
(England) 2019	Group stage	9	0	0	9	Gulbadin Naib
(India) 2023	Group stage	9	4	0	5	Hashmatullah Shahidi
Total	Group stage	24	5	0	19	–

==== ICC T20 World Cup ====
T20 World Cup record
Year	Round	Position	GP	W	L	T	NR
(South Africa) 2007	Did not qualify						
(England) 2009	Did not qualify						
(Cricket West Indies) 2010	Group Stage	12/12	2	0	2	0	0
(Sri Lanka) 2012	Group Stage	11/12	2	0	2	0	0
(Bangladesh) 2014	Group Stage	14/16	3	1	2	0	0
(India) 2016	Super 10	9/16	7	4	3	0	0
(Oman) (United Arab Emirates) 2021	Super 12	7/16	5	2	3	0	0
(Australia) 2022	Super 12	12/16	5	0	3	0	2
(Cricket West Indies) (United States) 2024	Semi-finals	3/20	8	5	3	0	0
Total	Semi-finals (2024)	3/20 (2024)	32	12	18	0	2

==== ICC Champions Trophy ====
ICC Champions Trophy record
Year	Round	Position	GP	W	L	T	NR
(Bangladesh) 1998	Not an ICC member						
(Kenya) 2000	Not an ICC member						
(Sri Lanka) 2002	Not an ICC member						
(England) 2004	Did not qualify						
(India) 2006	Did not qualify						
(South Africa) 2009	Did not qualify						
(England) (Wales) 2013	Did not qualify						
(England) (Wales) 2017	Did not qualify						
(Pakistan) (United Arab Emirates) 2025	Qualified						
(India) 2029	TBD						

==== ICC Cricket World Cup Qualifier ====
Host & Year	Round	Position	P	W	L	T	NR	Notes
(England) 1979	Not eligible – Not an ICC member							
(England) 1982	Not eligible – Not an ICC member							
(England) 1986	Not eligible – Not an ICC member							
(Netherlands) 1990	Not eligible – Not an ICC member							
(Kenya) 1994	Not eligible – Not an ICC member							
(Malaysia) 1997	Not eligible – Not an ICC member							
(Canada) 2001	Not eligible – Not an ICC member							
(Ireland) 2005	Did not qualify							
(South Africa) 2009	Playoffs	5th	10	6	4	0	0	Qualified for the 2009–10 Intercontinental Cup and gained ODI status until 2014
(New Zealand) 2014	Automatic qualification							
(Zimbabwe) 2018	Champions	1st	8	5	3	0	0	Qualified for the 2019 Cricket World Cup
(Zimbabwe) 2023	Automatic qualification							
Total			18	11	7	0	0	

==== ICC T20 World Cup Qualifier ====
Host & Year	Round	Position	P	W	L	T	NR	Notes
(Ireland) 2008	Not eligible, not an ODI nation at time of tournament							
(United Arab Emirates) 2010	Champions	1st	6	5	1	0	0	Qualified for the 2010 World Twenty20
(United Arab Emirates) 2012	Runners-up	2nd	9	8	1	0	0	Qualified for the 2012 ICC World Twenty20
(United Arab Emirates) 2013	Runners-up	2nd	9	7	2	0	0	Qualified for the 2014 ICC World Twenty20
(Ireland) (Scotland) 2015	Playoffs	5th	9	5	2	0	2	
(United Arab Emirates) 2019	Did not participate as already qualified for World Cup via another method							
Total			33	25	6	0	2	

==== ICC Intercontinental Cup ====
- 2009–10: Winners
- 2011–13: Runners-up
- 2015-17: Winners

==== ICC World Cricket League ====
- 2008
  - Division Five winners
  - Division Four winners
- 2009
  - Division Three winners
- 2010
  - Division One 3rd Place
- 2011–13
  - Championship Runners Up

==== Asia Cup ====
Asia Cup record
Year	Round	Position	GP	W	L	T	NR
(United Arab Emirates) 1984	Not eligible — Not an ICC Member						
(Sri Lanka) 1986	Not eligible — Not an ICC Member						
(Bangladesh) 1988	Not eligible — Not an ICC Member						
(India) 1990–91	Not eligible — Not an ICC Member						
(United Arab Emirates) 1995	Not eligible — Not an ICC Member						
(Sri Lanka) 1997	Not eligible — Not an ICC Member						
(Bangladesh) 2000	Not eligible — Not an ICC Member						
(Sri Lanka) 2004	Did not qualify						
(Pakistan) 2008	Did not qualify						
(Sri Lanka) 2010	Did not qualify						
(Bangladesh) 2012	Did not qualify						
(Bangladesh) 2014	Group stage	4/5	4	1	3	0	0
(Bangladesh) 2016	Did not qualify						
(United Arab Emirates) 2018	Super Fours	4/6	5	2	2	1	0
(United Arab Emirates) 2022	Super Fours	4/6	5	2	3	0	0
(Pakistan) (Sri Lanka) 2023	Group Stage	5/6	2	0	2	0	0
Total	Super Fours (2018, 2022)		16	5	10	1	0

==== Asian Games ====
Asian Games record
Year	Round	Position	GP	W	L	T	NR
(China) 2010	Silver Medal	2/9	3	2	1	0	0
(South Korea) 2014	Silver Medal	2/10	3	2	1	0	0
(China) 2022	Silver Medal	2/14	3	2	0	0	1
Total	Silver Medal	2nd	9	6	2	0	1

==== ACC Premier League ====
- 2014: Winners

==== ACC Trophy ====
- 1996–2002: Not eligible, not an ACC Member
- 2004: 6th place
- 2006: 3rd place
- 2008: 3rd place (Elite)
- 2010: Winners (Elite)

==== Desert T20 Challenge ====
- 2017: Winners

==== Middle East Cup ====
- 2006: Runners-up

==== ACC Twenty20 Cup ====
Year	Round	Position	GP	W	L	T	NR
(Kuwait) 2007	Joint champion with Oman	1/10	6	4	1	1	0
(United Arab Emirates) 2009	Champion	1/12	7	7	0	0	0
(Nepal) 2011	Champion	1/10	6	6	0	0	0
(Nepal) 2013	Champion	1/10	6	5	1	0	0
(United Arab Emirates) 2015	Did not participate						

=== Men's U-19 team ===
==== U-19 World Cup ====
Afghanistan's U19 World Cup record
Year	Result	Pos	№	Pld	W	L	T	NR
(Australia) 1988	Ineligible – not an ICC member							
(South Africa) 1998	Ineligible – not an ICC member							
(Sri Lanka) 2000	Ineligible – not an ICC member							
(New Zealand) 2002	Did not enter							
(Bangladesh) 2004	Did not enter							
(Sri Lanka) 2006	Did not qualify							
(Malaysia) 2008	Did not qualify							
(New Zealand) 2010	First round	16th	16	6	1	5	0	0
(Australia) 2012	First round	10th	16	6	3	3	0	0
(United Arab Emirates) 2014	Quarter-finals	7th	16	6	3	3	0	0
(Bangladesh) 2016	First round	9th	16	6	4	2	0	0
(New Zealand) 2018	Semi-finals	4th	16	6	3	2	0	1
(South Africa) 2020	Quarter-finals	7th	16	6	3	2	0	1
(Cricket West Indies) 2022	Semi-Finals	4th	16	6	3	3	0	0
(South Africa) 2024	First round	13th	16	4	1	3	0	0
Total				46	21	23	0	2

=== Men's A team ===
==== ACC Emerging Teams Asia Cup ====
ACC Emerging Teams Asia Cup record
Year	Round	Position	P	W	L	T	NR
(Singapore) 2013	Group Stage	5/8	3	2	1	0	0
(Bangladesh) 2017	Semi-finals	4/8	4	2	2	0	0
(Sri Lanka) (Pakistan) 2018	Group Stage	6/8	3	1	2	0	0
(Bangladesh) 2019	Semi-finals	4/8	4	2	2	0	0
(Sri Lanka) 2023	Group Stage	5/8	3	2	1	0	0
(Oman) 2024	Champion	1/8	5	4	1	0	0
Total	1 Title	-	22	13	9	0	0

== See also ==
- Sport in Afghanistan
- Out of the Ashes (2010 film), a 2010 documentary film
- Afghanistan A tour of Pakistan in 2013
