= Taj Malik =

Afghan cricketer and coach (born 1975)

Personal information
- Born: 1 January 1975 (age 51); Nangrahar, Afghanistan
- Batting: Right-handed
- Bowling: Right-arm leg-break
- Role: Batsman
- Source: Cricinfo, 8 April 2012

Taj Malik (Pashto: تاج ملک; born 1975) is an Afghan former cricketer and coach. He was a right-handed batsman and leg break bowler who played for Afghanistan. He got interested in cricket at Kacha Gari camp during England's 1987 tour of Pakistan. He is credited as one of the most influential persons in Afghan cricket transitioning refugees from playing tape ball to hard ball and arranging match invites from Peshawar cricket clubs, and was their first national coach. He was also chairman of the Afghanistan National Cricket Academy, leading its domestic competitions, and General Secretary of the Afghanistan Cricket Federation.

He was featured in Out of the Ashes, a documentary of the Afghanistan national cricket team's qualification for the 2010 ICC World Twenty20 tournament.
