= Afghan Women's XI =

Cricket team based in Australia

Personnel
- Captain: Nahida Sapan
- Coach: Chelsea Moscript

Team information
- Colours: Blue
- Founded: January 2025
- Last match: v. Cricket Without Borders; Junction Oval, Melbourne; 30 January 2025

Afghan Women's XI is a women's cricket team based in Australia. It consists of players who formerly played for the Afghanistan women's national cricket team who fled their country after the takeover of the Taliban in 2021.

== History ==
Australian cricketer Mel Jones facilitated the fleeing of members of the Afghanistan women's national cricket team from their country in 2021 following the Fall of Kabul to the Taliban. Former national team players have eventually been able to settle in Australia, mostly in Melbourne and Canberra.

The women's national team under the Afghanistan Cricket Board (ACB) was effectively disbanded while the men's national team was retained. Afghanistan remains a full member of the International Cricket Council (ICC), despite the requirement to maintain a women's national team. This was despite the Afghanistan Cricket Board not distributing ICC funding for the development of women's cricket.

In June 2024, the women's players wrote to the ICC asking for permission to form an international refugees team. Due to receiving no response to their letter, in January 2025, the Afghan women refugees formerly contracted with the ACB formed a team under the name "Afghan Women's XI".

They played their first match against Cricket Without Borders Charity XI on 30 January 2025 at the Junction Oval in Melbourne. Their opposition won by 7 wickets. In April 2025, the ICC announced that they would be supporting Afghan women's cricket, with the 25 ACB contracted players of the Afghan Women's XI being viewed as the first potential beneficiaries.

The team toured in England in July 2026.

== Fixtures and results ==
30 January 2025
Video

Afghan Women's; 103/9 (20 overs)	v	Cricket Without Borders; 106/3 (19.2 overs)

Cricket Without Borders won by 7 wickets
Junction Oval, Melbourne

== See also ==
- Afghan Women United, an Afghan refugee football team
