= Roya Samim =

Afghan cricketer

Personal information
- Born: Afghanistan
- Role: Opening batter

Domestic team information
- Years: Team
- 2022–: Fredericton

Roya Samim is an Afghan women's cricketer, who currently plays for Canadian club cricket team Fredericton. She was expected to play for the Afghanistan women's national cricket team before the team was dissolved following the 2021 Taliban offensive.

== Career ==
Samim is an opening batter. In 2019, she started campaigning for an Afghan professional women's team. In December 2020, the Afghanistan women's national cricket team was recreated by the Afghanistan Cricket Board (ACB), and Samim was one of 25 Afghan women given a contract to play. She trained for eight hours a day with the other contracted players in Kabul. The team never played an official match, as their first scheduled match against Oman was cancelled. The team's captain was never announced, but Samim was a candidate for the role.

After the 2021 Taliban offensive started, Samim travelled to Canada, with her two sisters. They left Afghanistan two days before the Taliban took control of Kabul, and one of Samim's brothers also joined them in Canada. Once in Canada, Samim tried contacting the International Cricket Council (ICC) and ACB about getting her teammates out of Afghanistan, but received no response. She has been supportive of the ICC's decision not to ban the Afghanistan men's team, despite calls to do so.

In 2022, Samim was featured in an esports match for Afghanistan. The esports series was set up as a protest against the Afghan women's team being unable to compete. Samim started playing for Fredericton Cricket Club in June 2022, and also worked with Cricket New Brunswick to form a women's provincial team.

== Personal life ==
Aside from cricket, Samim worked as a mathematics teacher in Afghanistan. As of 2021, she planned to study for a Bachelor of Business Administration degree in Canada, and as of 2022, she worked as a settlement worker, helping other refugees.
