= 2024 Mirwais Nika 3-day Regional =

Cricket tournament

- Dates: 28 May – 20 June 2023
- Administrator: Afghanistan Cricket Board
- Cricket format: multi day cricket (3 days)
- Tournament format(s): Double round-robin and final
- Champions: Boost Region (1st title)
- Participants: 5
- Matches: 10
- Most runs: Arshaduddin Safi (393)
- Most wickets: Khalil Gurbaz (17)

The 2024 Mirwais Neka Regional Three-Day Tournament was 4th edition of the Mirwais Nika 3-Day Tournament, a first-class cricket competition in Afghanistan.The season started on 17 May and finished on 4 June 2024. Mis Ainak Region were the defending champions.

== Points table ==
The following teams competed in the tournament:

Team	Pld	W	L	D	NR	Pts
Boost Region	4	2	0	2	0	66
Mis Ainak Region	4	1	1	2	0	53
Speen Ghar Region	4	1	0	3	0	51
Amo Region	4	1	2	1	0	34
Band-e-Amir Region	4	0	2	2	0	27

Advanced to the final
