= 2023 Mirwais Nika 3-day Regional =

- Dates: 28 May – 20 June 2023
- Administrator: Afghanistan Cricket Board
- Cricket format: multi day cricket (3 days)
- Tournament format(s): Double round-robin and final
- Champions: Mis Ainak Region (1st title)
- Participants: 5
- Matches: 11
- Player of the series: Rafi Sadiq
- Most runs: Barakatullah Ibrahimzai (491)
- Most wickets: Khair Mohammad (24)

The 2023 Mirwais Nika 3-day Regional was 3rd edition of the Mirwais Nika 3-Day Tournament, a first-class cricket competition in Afghanistan.The tournament took place from 28 May to 20 June 2023. The defending champions were Band-e-Amir Region, but in the final, Mis Ainak Region emerged as the winners of the 2023 season

The 3rd edition of the Mirwais Neka Regional Three-Day Tournament is set to begin on May 28 in Nangarhar Province. The event features 5 regional teams which are scheduled to compete in a round-robin format at two different venues in Nangarhar province. A total of 11 games will be played in the tournament across 23 days from May 28 to June 17. Mis-e- Ainak, Band-e-Amir, Amo, Bost and Speen Ghar are the 5 regional participating teams that will play once against each other in the round-robin stage, with the top two advancing to the final, which is staged for June 17–19 in Ghazi Amanullah Khan Cricket Stadium, Nangarhar.

== Background ==
The competition is crucial for nurturing new talent and advancing cricket in Afghanistan. It is the fifth domestic event in Afghanistan's annual cricket calendar and precedes first-class and List-A events later in the year.

== Final ==
17–20 June 2023
Scorecard

Mis Ainak Region	v	Amo Region
335; Abdullah Zadran 93; Azim Zadran 5/96		255; Abdul Hadi 83*; Khalil Gurbaz 6/49
264; Barkat Ibrahimzai 148*; Kamil Kakar 3/61		153; Mohammad Shahzad 65*; Khalil Gurbaz 4/20

Mis-Ainak won by 191 runs
Najib Taraki Cricket Ground
Umpires: Bismillah Jan Shinwari and Muhammad Sabir
Player of the match: Barakatullah Ibrahimzai

- Mis Ainak Region, elected to bat first.
- Match days :17,18,19,20 June 2023 - day (4-day match)
