= Tajikistan women's national cricket team =

Cricket team

Tajikistan
- Flag of Tajikistan
- Association: Tajikistan Cricket Federation

International Cricket Council
- ICC status: Associate member (2021)
- ICC region: Asia

International cricket
- First international: c. Afghanistan in Shahrinav District; July 2012
- As of 13 January 2023

The Tajikistan women's national cricket team is the team that represents the country of Tajikistan in international women's cricket matches. They made their international debut when they hosted Afghanistan in July 2012 in Shahrinav District in a three match series which they won one and lost two.

== Head coaches ==
- (Afghanistan) Asadullah Khan 2012-
