= Afghan cricket team in Pakistan in 2013 =

Afghan cricket tour of Pakistan in 2013
	Pakistan A	Afghanistan
- Dates: 6 February – 13 February
Captains	Shahid Afridi	Nawroz Mangal

One Day International series
- Results: Pakistan A won the 2-match series 2–0
Most runs	Kamran Akmal (104)	Gulbodin Naib (111)
Most wickets	Wahab Riaz (6)	Dawlat Zadran (2)

Twenty20 International series
- Results: Pakistan A won the 1-match series 1–0
Most runs	Ahmed Shehzad (68)	Asghar Stanikzai (47)
Most wickets	Wahab Riaz (2)	Nawroz Mangal (2)

The Afghanistan national cricket team visited Pakistan from 6 to 13 February 2013 and played a series of limited-overs matches against the Pakistan A team and some regional sides. They played five one-days and a Twenty20 at three venues around the country. Afghanistan won the first match of the series, but lost the next five matches. All matches were broadcast live on GEO Super television.

== List A Tour Matches ==
=== Hyderabad and Karachi v Afghanistan ===
6 February 2013
9:30
Scorecard

Hyderabad and Karachi; 112 (37.5 overs)	v	Afghanistan; 116/1 (18.4 overs)
Mohammad Sami 21 (39); Amir Hamza 5/15 (10 overs)		Mohammad Shahzad 58 (35); Atif Maqbool 1/13 (5.4 overs)

Afghanistan won by 9 wickets
Niaz Stadium, Hyderabad
Umpires: Akbar Khan and Khalid Mahmood

- Hyderabad and Karachi won the toss and elected to bat

Match Report

=== Bahawalpur and Multan v Afghanistan ===
8 February 2013
9:30
Scorecard

Bahawalpur and Multan; 160/7 (42 overs)	v	Afghanistan; 157/9 (50 overs)
Naved Yasin 50* (84); Amir Hamza 3/36 (10 overs)		Mohibullah Paak 49* (100); Zulfiqar Babar 4/28 (10 overs)

Bahawalpur and Multan won by 3 wickets
Multan Cricket Stadium, Multan
Umpires: Aftab Gillani and Nadeem Iqbal

- Bahawalpur and Multan won the toss and elected to field

Match Report

=== Faisalabad and Rawalpindi v Afghanistan ===
10 February 2013
09:30
Scorecard

Faisalabad and Rawalpindi; 167/2 (31 overs)	v	Afghanistan; 166 (49.1 overs)
Awais Zia 75 (77); Rahmat Shah 1/28 (3 overs)		Rahmat Shah 48 (79); Sohail Tanvir 3/30 (10 overs)

Faisalabad and Rawalpindi won by 8 wickets
Gaddafi Stadium, Lahore
Umpires: Ahmed Shahpakteen (Afg) and Riazuddin (Pak)
Player of the match: Awais Zia (Faisalabad and Rawalpindi)

- Faisalabad and Rawalpindi won the toss and elected to field
- List A debuts: Fazal Niazai, M Nasim Baras, Rahmat Shah and Yamin Ahmadzai (Afghanistan)

== List A Series ==
=== 1st One Day ===
11 February 2013
13:30 (D/N)
Scorecard

Pakistan A 125/2 (16.1 overs)	v	Afghanistan; 122 (38.5 overs)
Umar Akmal 47* (30); Izatullah Dawlatzai 1/34 (4 overs)		Mohammad Shahzad 33 (51); Wahab Riaz 3/18 (7.5 overs)

Pakistan A won by 8 wickets
Gaddafi Stadium, Lahore
Umpires: Ghaffar Kazmi and Zameer Haider
Player of the match: Wahab Riaz (Pakistan A)

Match Report

=== 2nd One Day ===
12 February 2013
13:30 (D/N)
Scorecard

Pakistan A 208/3 (41.3 overs)	v	Afghanistan; 207/9 (50 overs)
Kamran Akmal 104 (105); Mirwais Ashraf 1/28 (6 overs)		Gulbodin Naib 100 (93); Imran Khan 3/35 (8 overs)

Pakistan A won by 7 wickets
Gaddafi Stadium, Lahore
Umpires: Shozab Raza and Zameer Haider
Player of the match: Kamran Akmal

- Afghanistan won the toss and elected to bat

== T20 series ==
=== Only T20 ===
13 February 2013
18:00 (D/N)
Scorecard

Pakistan A 189/6 (20 overs)	v	Afghanistan; 140/9 (20 overs)
Ahmed Shehzad 68 (45); Nawroz Mangal 2/17 (2 overs)		Asghar Stanikzai 47* (45); Wahab Riaz 2/8 (4 overs)

Pakistan A won by 49 runs
Gaddafi Stadium, Lahore
Umpires: Ghaffar Kazmi and Shozab Raza
Player of the match: Ahmed Shehzad (Pakistan A) and Asghar Stanikzai (Afghanistan)

- Afghanistan won the toss and elected to field
- Twenty20 debut: Mohibullah Paak (Afghanistan)

== Broadcasters ==
- GEO Super - PAKISTAN
- Sports 3 - AFGHANISTAN
