= Green Afghanistan One Day Cup =

Afghanistan cricket tournament

- Countries: Afghanistan
- Administrator: Afghanistan Cricket Board
- Format: Limited-overs (50 overs per side)
- First edition: 2022
- Latest edition: 2023
- Tournament format: Single round-robin, then finals series
- Number of teams: 4
- Website: Afghanistan Cricket Board
- 2023 Green Afghanistan One Day Cup

The Green Afghanistan One Day Cup (also known Super Cola Green Afghanistan One Day Cup for sponsorship reasons) is a cricket tournament organized by the Afghanistan Cricket Board (ACB) that forms part of the Afghanistan domestic cricket season. It is a List A 50-over limited-overs cricket tournament.

The tournament is contested between teams representing the four Afghan domestic cricket teams.

== Background ==
The three teams were named Maiwand Defenders, Pamir Legends and Hindukush Strikers. Pamir and Hindukush are named after mountain ranges, while Maiwand is a district in Kandahar Province with historical significance. The Junior Champions joined the tournament in the 2023 edition.

ACB chairman Mirwais Ashraf said the tournament would allow senior and junior players to compete together and help prepare players for upcoming international fixtures. He also encouraged supporters to attend the matches.

ACB chief executive Naseeb Khan said the tournament’s name, “Green Afghanistan”, was intended to highlight the country’s natural scenery and expressed hope that supporters would attend the matches during the Eid holiday.

According to the Afghanistan Cricket Board, the country’s domestic structure included a regional List A competition and provincial Grade One one-day competitions, with the tournament intended to complement the existing domestic calendar.

== Format ==
The tournament was scheduled to be played in a one-day format over 12 days, with seven matches. Each team was to play the other two teams twice before a final on 20 May.

The participating teams included national-level players alongside players from the Afghanistan Cricket Board’s emerging and development programs.

== History ==
=== 2022 edition ===
The 2022 Green Afghanistan One Day Cup began on 8 May in Khost Province and concluded with the Hindukush Strikers defeating the Pamir Legends by three wickets in the final.

In the final, the Pamir Legends elected to bat first and scored 172/4 in 39 overs. Rain interruptions reduced the match first to 39 overs, then to 36 overs, and finally to 33 overs. Under the Duckworth-Lewis-Stern (DLS) method, Hindukush Strikers were set a revised target of 204 runs from 33 overs.

The Strikers reached the revised target in the final over, winning by three wickets. Ibrahim Zadran and Bahir Shah each scored a half-century, while Najibullah Zadran made a late contribution with the bat.

Ibrahim Zadran was named Player of the Match after scoring 60 runs. Shahidullah Kamal finished as the tournament’s leading batter with 271 runs at an average of 67.75, including three half-centuries, while left-arm spinner Zia Akbar was named the tournament’s best bowler after taking 14 wickets at an average of 12. Sediqullah Atal received the Emerging Player award, and Ibrahim Zadran was named Player of the Tournament after scoring 254 runs, including one century and one half-century.

=== 2023 edition ===
The 2023 edition saw one new team, the Junior Champions, join the competition, with the Pamir Legends, Hindukush Strikers and the Maiwand Defenders returning.

The final of the 2023 edition ended without a result after rain prevented the completion of the second innings, resulting in the Legends and Defenders being declared joint winners.

The Legends elected to field first. The Defenders scored 296/8, with Hasmatullah Shahidi making 124, Sediqullah Atal scoring 53, and Ikram Alikhil contributing 40. Sharafuddin Ashraf took three wickets, while Zahir Khan and Gulbadin Naib took two wickets each.

In reply, the Legends reached 45/1 after seven overs before rain interrupted play. As conditions prevented the match from resuming, the final was abandoned, and both teams were declared joint winners.

Wafiullah Tarakhil was named Emerging Player after scoring 136 runs. Rahmat Shah was named Best Batter after scoring 367 runs at an average of 91.75. Zahir Khan was named Best Bowler after taking 19 wickets, while Gulbadin Naib was named Player of the Tournament after scoring 150 runs at an average of 37.60 and taking 11 wickets.

== See also ==
- Ahmad Shah Abdali 4-day Tournament
- Ghazi Amanullah Khan Regional One Day Tournament
