= Azizullah Fazli =

Afghanistan cricket administrator

- عزیزالله فضلي

Chairman of Afghanistan Cricket Board
- In office 22 August 2021 – 6 November 2021
- Succeeded by: Mirwais Ashraf
- In office September 2018 – July 2019
- Succeeded by: himself

Azizullah Fazli (عزیزالله فضلي) is a former Afghan cricketer. He served a term from September 2018 until July 2019 and was reappointed on 22 August 2021 and served until 6 November 2021. Fazli was one of the first Afghan cricket players.
