= Afghanistan women's national cricket team =

National cricket team

Afghanistan
- Association: Afghanistan Cricket Board

International cricket
- First international: vs Tajikistan in Dushanbe, July 2012
- As of 5 January 2023

The Afghanistan women's national cricket team was the team that represented the country of Afghanistan in international women's cricket matches. The team was first established in 2010, but played only a single tournament amidst opposition from Islamists opposed to women's sport. An attempt at revival was made in 2020 when the Afghanistan Cricket Board awarded central contracts to 25 players. However, the team was disbanded following the 2021 Taliban offensive and capture of Kabul in accordance with the Taliban's ban on women's sport.

== History ==
=== 2010–2014 ===
The team was first formed in 2010, but disbanded in 2014. Although the team never played representative cricket in ICC competition, it had been scheduled to take part in the 2011 ACC Women's Twenty20 Championship in Kuwait, which ran from 17 to 25 February. The team was forced to withdraw from the tournament before travelling to Kuwait due to elements in Afghanistan opposing women's participation in sport.

In 2012, the team participated in a 6 team tournament in Dushanbe, Tajikistan, and became Champion by winning four matches and tying one.

=== 2020–August 2021 ===
In November 2020, the Afghanistan Cricket Board awarded central contracts to twenty-five players, in their bid to form a national team to take part in ICC tournaments. In October 2020, ACB organised skills and fitness camp as well as the national team trial camp at the Alokozay Kabul International Cricket Ground for the players who were selected from the talent pool.

In April 2021, the ICC awarded permanent Test and One Day International (ODI) status to all full member women's teams.

== Exile ==
Concerns regarding the safety of the Afghan women cricketers and development of women's cricket in Afghanistan were raised following the 2021 Taliban offensive and the 15 August 2021 Fall of Kabul.

As of 31 August 2021, three of the Afghan women's cricket team, Roya Samim and her two sisters, were in exile in Canada. Samim said that the team members remaining in Afghanistan were afraid of the Taliban. She stated that the International Cricket Council (ICC) had failed to respond to emails calling for help from team members seeking evacuation from Afghanistan, and that the Afghan Cricket Board (ACB) had given no help except to say "Wait". The ICC said that it was not aware of having received emails asking for help and that it was closely monitoring the situation. According to The Guardian, the ICC was keeping in contact with the ACB in order to avoid acting unilaterally. An ACB spokesperson stated that the Taliban appeared to support the continuation of men's cricket.

One of the team members was threatened by the Taliban after the fall of Kabul with being killed "if [she tried] to play cricket again". Another team member, in exile as of 2 September 2021, stated that the ICC "never help" the women's cricket team, "always disappoint" the team and only communicate with the ACB rather than contacting the women's team directly. Several of the team members expressed their expectations and hopes for the women's team to reorganise.

Hamid Shinwari, chief executive officer of the ACB, stated in early September 2021 that he expected the Afghan women's cricket team "to be stopped". The Taliban also said that Afghan women would be barred from playing sport. However, Afghanistan Cricket Board's chairman Azizullah Fazli clarified later in an Al Jazeera interview that women will be allowed to play cricket and that they would not be stopped.

As of April 2023, most of the squad had re-united in Australia. There have been multiple attempts to form a refugee Afghan women's team.

In January 2025, 21 players who were formerly contracted by the ACB played an exhibition match in Australia, using the team name "Afghan Women's XI".

== Tournament history ==
Host/Year	Round/Rank
(Tajikistan) Women's Tournament in Dushanbe, 2012	Champions

== Head coaches ==
- Diana Barakzai 2010–2014
- Tuba Sangar 2014–2021

== Captains ==
- Sehama Khan 2010–2014

== See also ==
- Afghanistan national cricket team
