= Kandahar International Cricket Stadium =

Cricket stadium in Kandahar, Afghanistan

Kandahar International Cricket Stadium د کندهار نړيوال کريکټ لوبغالی
Ground information
- Location: Aino Meyna, Kandahar, Afghanistan
- Coordinates: 31.6405°N 65.7626°E
- Establishment: 2012; 13 years ago
- Capacity: 14,000
- Owner: Afghanistan Cricket Board
- Operator: Afghanistan Cricket Board
- Tenants: Boost Defenders; Kandahar Province cricket team

International information
- As of January 25, 2020; Source: ESPNcricinfo

Kandahar International Cricket Stadium (Pashto: د کندهار نړيوال کريکټ لوبغالی) is a cricket stadium in Kandahar, Afghanistan.

The stadium was built on 44 acres of land in the heart of Aino Meyna, a new suburb of Kandahar. The land was donated by Mahmood Karzai to the Afghanistan Cricket Board in 2012.

In August 2014, the Government of India approved the grant of $1 million for the construction of the stadium under the Small Development Project Scheme. Construction of the stadium was delayed for two years but has resumed in early 2016, and is expected to be completed before the summer of 2017. As of October 17, 2016, about 70% of the construction work has been completed.

It is expected that once the stadium opens, cricket will become more popular in southern Afghanistan. The Kandahar International Cricket Stadium will be one of the leading cricket stadiums in Afghanistan after Ghazi Amanullah International Cricket Stadium in the Ghazi Amanullah Town of Jalalabad, and Alokozay Kabul International Cricket Ground in Kabul.

It is hoped that the stadium will be able to attract international teams to play Afghanistan in Afghanistan who became full members of the ICC in 2017.
