= Boost Region =

Afghanistan domestic cricket team

Personnel
- Captain: Najibullah Zadran
- Coach: TBC

Team information
- Founded: 2017
- Home ground: Kandahar International Cricket Stadium
- Capacity: 14,000

History
- Mirwais Nika 3-Day Tournament wins: 0
- Ghazi Amanullah Khan Regional One Day Tournament wins: 2
- Qosh Tepa National T20 Cup wins: 0
T20 kit

The Boost Region are one of five Afghanistan men's first-class cricket teams that make up Afghanistan Cricket. It competes in the Mirwais Nika 3-Day Tournament first class (3-day) competition, Ghazi Amanullah Khan Regional One Day Tournament domestic one day competition and the Qosh Tepa National T20 Cup Twenty20 competition.

The region represents the following provinces in the south and southwest of Afghanistan: Kandahar, Helmand, Nimroz, Uruzgan and Zabul.

== History ==
Boost Region compete in the Ahmad Shah Abdali 4-day Tournament, which has first-class status from 2017 onwards, They also play in the Ghazi Amanullah Khan Regional One Day Tournament, which was granted List A status from 2017. Boost Region take part in the Qosh Tepa National T20 Cup, the first edition of which will be held in April 2024.

== Squads ==
- Najibullah Zadran (c)
- Numan Shah
- Masood Gurbaz
- Hazratullah Zazai
- Imran Mir
- Rahmat Shah
- Nasir Jamal
- Ali Ahmad
- Bilal Ahmad
- Abdullah Tarakhail
- Nangialai Kharoti
- Mohammadullah
- Abdul Baqi
- Babar Khan
- Yamin Ahmadzai
- Sayed Shirzad
- Lalbaz Sinzai
- Faridoon Dawoodzai
- Mohibullah Zurmati
- Bashir Ahmad
