= Mirwais Ashraf =

Afghanistan cricketer (born 1988)

Chairman of Afghanistan Cricket Board
- Incumbent
- Assumed office 6 November 2021
- Preceded by: Azizullah Fazli
- Cricket career

Personal information
- Born: 30 June 1988 (age 38); Kunduz, Kunduz Province, Afghanistan
- Batting: Right-handed
- Bowling: Right-arm fast-medium

International information
- National side: Afghanistan (2009–2015)
- ODI debut (cap 12): 30 August 2009 v Netherlands
- Last ODI: 17 January 2015 v Ireland
- ODI shirt no.: 16
- T20I debut (cap 12): 4 February 2010 v Canada
- Last T20I: 08 December 2013 v Pakistan
- T20I shirt no.: 16

Domestic team information
- Years: Team
- 2017: Band-e-Amir Region
- 2017: Amo Sharks

Career statistics
Competition	ODI	T20I	FC	LA
Matches	46	25	31	75
Runs scored	387	128	892	947
Batting average	14.33	11.63	19.82	19.32
100s/50s	0/1	0/1	0/3	0/4
Top score	52*	28*	87	79
Balls bowled	2,009	392	3,456	3,171
Wickets	46	14	51	81
Bowling average	29.56	31.71	32.45	26.60
5 wickets in innings	0	0	1	0
10 wickets in match	0	0	0	0
Best bowling	4/35	2/6	6/35	4/35
Catches/stumpings	8/–	5/–	21/–	15/–
Medal record
Representing Afghanistan
Men's Cricket
Asian Games
Silver medal – second place	2010 Guangzhou	Team
- Source: Cricinfo, 21 September 2022

Mirwais Ashraf Khan (Pashto: ميرويس اشرف خان) (born June 30, 1988) is an Afghan cricketer who plays for the national cricket team and has served as Chairman of the Afghanistan Cricket Board since 6 November 2021. Khan is a right-handed batsman and right-arm fast-medium bowler.

== Career ==
Ashraf made his One Day International (ODI) debut against the Netherlands at the VRA Cricket Ground on 30 August 2009. His first-class cricket debut was against the same opponents in Afghanistan's debut match in the Intercontinental Cup, where in the Netherlands' second innings he took four wickets for 24 runs to help set up an historic Afghan win by one wicket.

In September 2019, he was the leading wicket-taker in the 2019 Ghazi Amanullah Khan Regional One Day Tournament, with 16 dismissals in six matches.

== Board role ==
In his capacity as the chairman of the Afghanistan Cricket Board, Ashraf visited the burial sites of three Afghan cricket players killed in an airstrike from the Pakistan Air Force in Khandaro, a village in the Urgun District of Paktika Province on October 20, 2025, three days after the incident occurred. He was accompanied by Fareed Ahmad, Zahir Khan, Rahmat Shah, and Shabir Noori.
