= Out of the Ashes (2010 film) =

2010 film

- Film poster
- Directed by: Tim Albone; Lucy Martens; Leslie Knott
- Release date: 17 June 2010 (Edinburgh IFF)
- Running time: 86 minutes
- Country: United Kingdom
- Language: English

Out of the Ashes is a 2010 British documentary film directed by Tim Albone, Lucy Martens and Leslie Knott. It documents the story of the Afghanistan national cricket team's qualification for the 2010 ICC World Twenty20 tournament.
