= Afghanistan national cricket team =

Afghanistan
- Nickname(s): Afghan Atalan; Blue Tigers
- Association: Afghanistan Cricket Board

Personnel
- Test captain: Rahmat Shah
- One Day captain: Rahmat Shah
- T20I captain: Ibrahim Zadran
- Coach: Richard Pybus
- Batting coach: Andrew Puttick
- Bowling coach: Hamid Hassan

History
- Test status acquired: 2017

International Cricket Council
- ICC status: Affiliate Member (2001); Associate Member (2013); Full Member (2017)
- ICC region: Asia
ICC Rankings	Current	Best-ever
Test	11th	9th (1 May 2020)
ODI	6th	6th (31 October 2026)
T20I	9th	7th (5 May 2019)

Tests
- First Test: v. India at M. Chinnaswamy Stadium, Bengaluru 14–18 June 2018
- Last Test: v. Zimbabwe at Sharjah Cricket Stadium, Sharjah; 13–17 November 2026
Tests	Played	Won/Lost
Total	16	4/9 (3 draws)
This year	4	0/2 (2 draws)

One Day Internationals
- First ODI: v. Scotland at Willowmoore Park, Benoni; 19 April 2009
- Last ODI: v. Zimbabwe at Sharjah Cricket Stadium, Sharjah; 23 October 2026
ODIs	Played	Won/Lost
Total	191	96/88 (1 tie, 6 no results)
This year	10	7/3 (0 ties, 0 no results)
- World Cup appearances: 3 (first in 2015)
- Best result: 6th place (2023)
- World Cup Qualifier appearances: 2 (first in 2009)
- Best result: Champions (2018)

T20 Internationals
- First T20I: v. Ireland at Paikiasothy Saravanamuttu Stadium, Colombo; 1 February 2010
- Last T20I: v. Zimbabwe at Sharjah Cricket Stadium, Sharjah; 1 November 2026
T20Is	Played	Won/Lost
Total	171	102/65 (3 ties, 1 no result)
This year	15	8/6 (1 tie, 0 no results)
- T20 World Cup appearances: 8 (first in 2010)
- Best result: Semi-finals (2024)
- T20 World Cup Qualifier appearances: 4 (first in 2010)
- Best result: Champions (2010)
Test kit
ODI & T20I kit
- As of 17 November 2026

The Afghanistan men's national cricket team (Note: Pashto: د افغانستان کرکټ ملي لوب‌‌‌‌‌‌ډله Dari: تیم ملی کریکت افغانستان) represents Afghanistan in international cricket. It is a full member of the International Cricket Council (ICC) with Test, One-Day International and T20 International status.

Cricket has been played in Afghanistan since the mid-19th century, but it was only in the early 21st century that the national team began to enjoy success. The Afghanistan Cricket Board was formed in 1995, becoming an affiliate member of the ICC in 2001 and a member of the cricket confederation, Asian Cricket Council (ACC) in 2003. After nearly a decade of playing international cricket, on 22 June 2017 full ICC membership (and therefore Test status) was granted to Afghanistan. Alongside Ireland, this took the number of Test cricket playing nations to twelve. In view of the persistent conflict and insecurity in Afghanistan, following this status, the team moved to a new home ground in Dehradun, in India. The current home ground of the Afghanistan men's cricket team is the Sharjah Cricket Stadium in the UAE.

Cricket has grown in popularity in Afghanistan, and the national team has gained international recognition through its participation in major tournament. Media Coverage linked the sport's rise to broader social interest in cricket within the country.

== History ==
=== Pre-ODI history ===
Cricket in Afghanistan gained traction by Afghan expatriates who learnt the sport while living in Pakistan in the 1980s and 1990s, during the post-Soviet invasion era. Most members of the early Afghanistan national cricket team grew up in Pakistan and participated in the country's domestic cricket structure, making use of cricket facilities in Peshawar with the support of the Pakistan Cricket Board (PCB). It was during this time that the Afghanistan Cricket Federation (now ACB) was also founded, in 1995. Like all sports, cricket was initially banned by the Taliban, but cricket became an exception in 2000 (being the only sport in Afghanistan to be approved by the Taliban). The ACF received recognition from the International Cricket Council (ICC) in 2001.

Afghanistan fielded their cricket team in Pakistan's domestic setup for the first time in the 2001–02 season, participating in the second division of the Quaid-e-Azam Trophy where they drew two and lost three of their five games. They returned for the Cornelius Trophy in the 2002–03 season, drawing one and losing three matches. In the 2003–04 season, they made an appearance in the PCB's inter-district tournament in Peshawar, where they registered their lone victory against Swabi, drew twice and lost two matches.

They began playing in Asian regional tournaments in 2004, finishing sixth in their first ACC Trophy. More success began in 2006 when they were runners-up to Bahrain in the Middle East Cup and beat an MCC team featuring former England captain Mike Gatting by 171 runs in Mumbai. Gatting was dismissed for a duck.

They toured England in the summer of 2006, winning six out of seven matches. Three of their wins came against the second XIs of Essex, Glamorgan and Leicestershire. They finished third in the ACC Trophy that year, beating Nepal in a play-off match.

They won their first tournament in 2007, sharing the ACC Twenty20 Cup with Oman after the two tied in the final. They began their qualifying campaign for the 2011 World Cup in Jersey in 2008, winning Division Five of the World Cricket League. They finished third in the ACC Trophy Elite tournament the same year, and won a second consecutive WCL tournament, Division Four in Tanzania later in the year.

The Afghanistan national team was coached by former Pakistani cricketers Kabir Khan and Rashid Latif in its initial years. During this period, a number of Afghan international cricketers made appearances for Pakistani domestic outfits in the first-class circuit.

In January 2009, Afghanistan progressed to the 2009 World Cup Qualifier by winning Division Three of the World Cricket League in Buenos Aires, topping the table on net run rate ahead of Uganda and Papua New Guinea.

In 2010, Afghanistan competed at the Asian Games, a non-ICC T20 event hosted by China, where they defeated a second-string Pakistan team by 22 runs in the semi-finals in what was considered an upset. In May 2011, the Afghan team embarked on a tour of Pakistan to partake in a three-match limited overs series against Pakistan A, where they were whitewashed by the home team 3–0. They followed this up with another tour in September to participate in Pakistan's domestic National T20 Cup in Karachi as the Afghan Cheetahs, but had another poor outing, losing all three of their matches.

=== ODI status ===
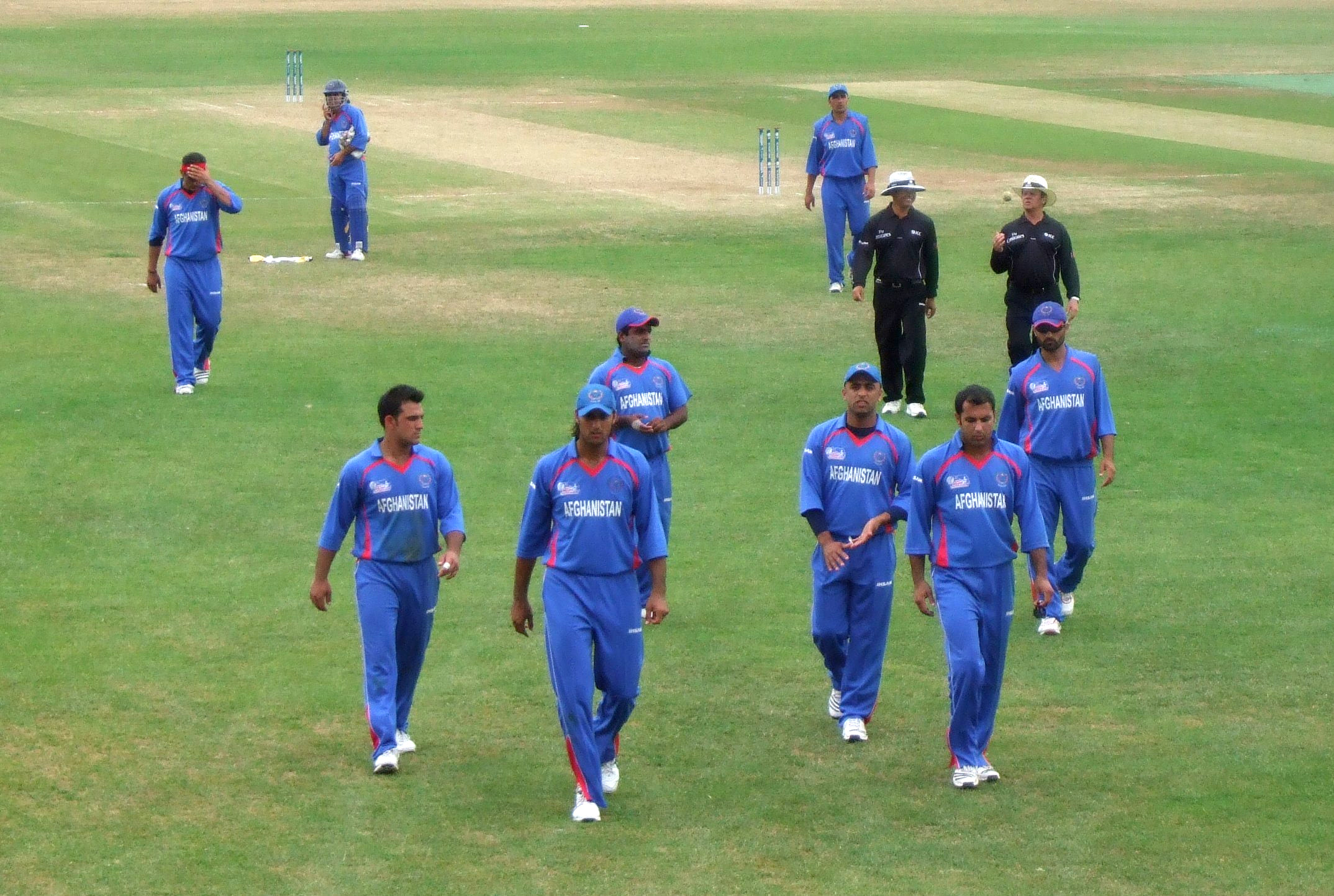
The national team at Rotterdam, 2010 ICC WCL Division One

In the 2011 Cricket World Cup qualifying tournament, Afghanistan failed to progress to the World Cup, but earned ODI status for four years. Their first ODI was against Scotland in the 5th place playoff, having previously beaten the Scots earlier in the tournament; Afghanistan won by 89 runs. Afghanistan became the only affiliate member to have ODI status.

In the Intercontinental Cup Afghanistan played its first first-class match against a Zimbabwe XI in a four-day match in Mutare. During the match, which was drawn, Afghan batsman Noor Ali scored centuries in both his innings, making him only the fourth player to do so on their first-class debut. Later, in August 2009, they played the Netherlands in the same competition at the VRA Cricket Ground, winning a low-scoring match by one wicket.

Afghanistan then took part in the 2009 ACC Twenty20 Cup in the United Arab Emirates. Afghanistan was drawn in Group A, which Afghanistan topped at the end of the group stages by winning all five of their matches. In the semi-finals the Afghans defeated Kuwait by 8 wickets. In the final they met the hosts, the United Arab Emirates, whom they defeated by 84 runs.

On 1 February 2010, Afghanistan played their first Twenty20 International against Ireland, which they lost by 5 wickets. On 13 February 2010, Afghanistan defeated the United Arab Emirates by 4 wickets to make their way to the 2010 ICC World Twenty20 to be in the West Indies in April 2010. Later the same day, they defeated Ireland by 8 wickets in the Final of 2010 ICC World Twenty20 Qualifier to win the qualifier. Afghanistan were in Group C of the main tournament, with India and South Africa. During their first match against India, opening batsman Noor Ali hit 50 runs, helping Afghanistan to a score of 115 in their 20 overs. Despite this they lost the match by 8 wickets. In their second match, the team were reduced to 14/6 at one stage, before a late rally from Mirwais Ashraf and Hamid Hassan helped Afghanistan post 88 all out, resulting in a loss by 59 runs.

The team's Intercontinental Cup campaign continued in 2010, with wins over Ireland, Canada, Scotland and Kenya before they beat Scotland by 7 wickets in the final in Dubai. Also in 2010, they won the ACC Trophy Elite tournament in Kuwait, beating Nepal in the final and finished third in Division One of the World Cricket League in the Netherlands. They took part in the cricket tournament at the 2010 Asian Games in China and won the silver medal, losing to Bangladesh in the final.

In 2011, Afghanistan begun the 2011–13 ICC World Cricket League Championship. They beat Canada and drew with the UAE. In the parallel one-day league, they won two matches against Canada and lost twice to the UAE. In December once again took part in the ACC Twenty20 Cup, this time in Nepal. They went on to win all of their matches to once again take the Cup.

On 10 February 2012, Afghanistan played a one-off One Day International (ODI) match against Pakistan at Sharjah, the first ever official game between the two teams and also the first ever ODI between an Affiliate and a Test-playing nation. Billed as a historic occasion for Afghan cricket, the game was won comfortably by Pakistan by seven wickets with 13 overs to spare. They also took on the Australia Cricket Team in an Only ODI at Sharjah in August 2012. They fell short in both matches, but their performance showed they were continuing to make progress. Their 2012 ICC International Cup games were also challenging, resulting in a split with the Netherlands and a loss to Ireland.

2013 brought greater success for Afghanistan. In March, they played two T20 Internationals against Scotland in UAE and prevailed in both matches. They also won two ODIs in the World Cricket League Championship against the same opponents.

In the WCL Championship table, as 2013 dawned Afghanistan was level with Scotland in third, trailing Ireland and the Netherlands for the two automatic qualification spots for the 2015 World Cup. However, two convincing wins in spring over Scotland boosted hopes some. Then in July the Netherlands failed to take any points against Ireland, leaving Afghanistan in a position to qualify if they could win their final four matches against poorer performing Namibia and Kenya. Despite the United Arab Emirates and the Netherlands both being able to win their remaining games, keeping the pressure on Afghanistan, Afghanistan handled Namibia, then defeated Kenya by 8 wickets on 2 October. With one final win over Kenya on 4 October by 7 wickets, Afghanistan secured second in the Championship with 19 points, and qualified for World Cup.

Afghanistan also crushed Scotland in their one-day ICC Intercontinental Cup league in March in Abu Dhabi: Afghanistan (275: Shah 67*, Davey 4–53) beat Scotland (125: Taylor 48*, Dawlatzai 6–57 and 145: Coetzer 57, Dawlatzai 5–37) by an innings and 5 runs. Izatullah Dawlatzai took eleven wickets.

In July 2014, Afghanistan toured Zimbabwe to play its 1st full series against a full member. The 4 match ODI series finished 2–2 and the 2 match first-class series finished 1–1.

With their victory over Zimbabwe on 25 December 2015, Afghanistan entered the top 10 of the ICC's ODI rankings for the first time.

=== Associate Membership ===
Afghanistan became an Affiliate member of the ICC in 2001. Then in 2009 it had attained one-day status until 2015.

In 2012, the Asian Cricket Council decided to nominate Afghanistan for Associate membership with the ICC, with the request being looked into at the ICC's annual conference in June. Becoming an Associate would mean higher funding (the ICC had been paying $700,000 in annual funding to Afghanistan's organization, suggested to rise to $850,000 for Associate status), and also importantly would mean more exposure for the passionate and cricket-starved players from war-torn Afghanistan.

In March 2013, Afghanistan received a further support boost when a two-year Memorandum of Understanding (MoU) was signed between the Afghanistan Cricket Board (ACB) and Pakistan Cricket Board (PCB) for the development of Afghanistan cricket ahead of the 2015 World Cup.

The PCB provided technical and professional support, including game-education programmes, coaching courses, skill and performance analysis, and basic umpiring and curator courses. High performance camps for emerging players were also organised. The PCB-regulated National Cricket Academy (NCA) helped in improving technical, tactical, mental and physical skills and hosted lectures on doping, anti-corruption and various codes of conduct.

In April 2013, the Afghanistan Cricket Board (ACB) was also allocated US$422,000 (22,400,000 AFN approx.) from the ICC's targeted assistance and performance programme. The world governing body of cricket approved the grant at its IDI (ICC Development International) board meeting, which concluded in Dubai. The money, to be given over three years, was aimed at developing more competitive teams among ICC Full, Associate and Affiliate members. Previous countries to receive similar funding programmes included the Netherlands, Scotland, the West Indies, Zimbabwe and Ireland. An ICC statement suggested the funding was targeted towards the development of the National Cricket Academy in Kabul.

On 26 June 2013, at the ICC's annual meeting in London, England, Afghanistan received its Associate Membership with the statement:

"Afghanistan is the only country that receives the Associate Membership in a short period of time in reward to the efforts Afghanistan made for the promotion of cricket," (Dr Noor Muhammad, CEO of the Afghanistan Cricket Board (ACB), on the ACC website)

=== 2015 Cricket World Cup ===
Qualification for the tournament was a historic feat for cricket in Afghanistan, one amplified by the fact that the team included many players who picked up the game in refugee camps outside their war-torn country.

Afghanistan made their World Cup debut in the 2015 Cricket World Cup in which their first game was against Bangladesh at the Manuka Oval in Canberra, Australia. The match resulted in a 105 run defeat. On 26 February 2015, Afghanistan won their first World Cup match against Scotland, winning by one wicket. The team, however, lost all its remaining games and was knocked out of the tournament in the opening round.

=== 2019 Cricket World Cup ===
The 2019 Cricket World Cup was the second Cricket World Cup in which Afghanistan participated in, and the first consecutive World Cup appearance for the time. This World Cup was in a "round robin" format where Afghanistan faced all the other teams but did not manage to claim victory against any national team in the tournament for the first time in their short history in the World Cup tournament.

=== 2023 Cricket World Cup ===
In the 2023 Cricket World Cup, Afghanistan secured a victory by 69 runs against the defending champions, England, in their third match of the World Cup on 15 October 2023. This was the first time Afghanistan defeated England and the first time Afghanistan defeated the defending Cricket World Cup champions. They also defeated Pakistan in ODI cricket for the first time. They also defeated Sri Lanka for the first time in the Cricket World Cup by 7 wickets on 30 October 2023. This was also the first time in a Cricket World Cup that Afghanistan had won two matches consecutively. In the following match, they defeated the Netherlands for the first time in the Cricket World Cup. This was the first time Afghanistan achieved three consecutive victories in the Cricket World Cup.

=== Post-World Cup tours ===
The team visited Zimbabwe for the second time in October, where Afghanistan clinched a historic one-day international series over Zimbabwe after a 73-run victory in Bulawayo saw them win 3–2.

In doing so, they became the first non-Test-playing country to win a multi-game bilateral ODI series against a Test team. The Afghanistan cricket team toured the United Arab Emirates to play the United Arab Emirates cricket team in December 2016. The tour consisted of three Twenty20 International (T20I) matches. Afghanistan won the series 3–0. The Afghanistan cricket team toured Bangladesh in September and October 2016 to play three One Day Internationals (ODIs) matches. This was Afghanistan's first full series against a Test-playing team other than Zimbabwe and was the first bilateral series between the two teams.

Ahead of the ODI series, there was a fifty-over warm-up game between the Bangladesh Cricket Board XI and Afghanistan in Fatullah. Afghanistan won the warm-up match by 66 runs and Bangladesh won the ODI series 2–1.

In February 2017 the International Cricket Council (ICC) awarded first-class status to Afghanistan's four-day domestic competition.

The Afghan cricket team toured Zimbabwe between January and February 2017. The tour consisted of five One Day International (ODI) matches. Prior to the ODI series, the Afghanistan A cricket team played five "unofficial" ODI matches against the Zimbabwe A cricket team. All of those matches had been designated List A status. Afghanistan won the initial List A series 4–1 and the ODI series 3–2. 2017

The Ireland cricket team toured India during March 2017 to participate in a series of matches against Afghanistan, consisting of three T20 matches, five ODI contests and an ICC Intercontinental Cup match. All the matches took place in Greater Noida. The Afghan team were highly successful, emerging victorious in both the T20I series 3–0 and the ODI series 3–2. Afghanistan also won the ICC Intercontinental Cup match, by the margin of an innings and 172 runs.

The Afghanistan cricket team completed another tour in June 2017, this time facing the West Indies. The tour marked Afghanistan's first bilateral tour against a full member nation other than Zimbabwe. (Later that month, Afghanistan itself was awarded that status.) The tour was less successful for the Afghans, who were convincingly defeated 3–0 in the T20 series. They performed better in the ODI series, seizing a 1–1 draw after the final match was washed out with no result. Afghanistan registered their first win against Sri Lanka in Asia Cup.

=== Towards Test status ===
Afghanistan qualified for 2012 ICC World Twenty20 held in Sri Lanka as the runner-up of the ICC World Twenty20 Qualifier and joined India and England in the group stage. In the first match against India on 19 September, Afghanistan won the toss and elected to field. India posted 159/5 in 20 overs but Afghanistan fell short of that target by scoring 136 in 19.3 overs. In the second match against England on 21 September, Afghanistan won the toss and again elected to field. England set a target of 196/5 (20 overs) but Afghanistan were all out for 80 in 17.2 overs. England and India qualified for the Super Eights and Afghanistan was eliminated as a result of this match.

On 3 October 2013, Afghanistan beat Kenya to finish second in the WCL Championship and qualify for the 2015 Cricket World Cup, becoming the 20th team to gain entry into the tournament overall. Afghanistan secured their passage to Australia and New Zealand in 2015 by beating Kenya comprehensively for the second time in succession in Sharjah, sealing their maiden World Cup qualification. They finished second in the World Cricket League Championship — nine wins in 14 matches — and joined Ireland as the second Associate team in the 2015 World Cup, while the remaining two spots for Associates will be decided by a qualifying tournament in New Zealand in 2014. Afghanistan will join Pool A at the World Cup along with Australia, Bangladesh, England, New Zealand, Sri Lanka and another qualifier. On 24 November 2013, Afghanistan beat Kenya to qualify for the 2014 T20 world cup.

In March 2014, Afghanistan beat Hong Kong in the 2014 ICC World Twenty20 but could not make it to the next stage of super 10 having lost the two matches to Bangladesh and Nepal.

On 25 February 2015, Afghanistan won their first Cricket World Cup match, beating Scotland by one wicket. Afghanistan participated in the World Twenty20 2016 in India. They were unable to qualify for the Semi-Finals of the International Tournament. They defeated the eventual champions, West Indies, during their final group match of the tournament.

Their third match was against the full member test team Zimbabwe. They played exceptionally well, beating Zimbabwe by 59 runs. Afghanistan qualified for the Super 10 stage of the tournament as a result of this match, while Zimbabwe were eliminated. Afghanistan progressed to the second phase of a World Twenty20 tournament for the first time. On 25 June 2016, Lalchand Rajput was named as head coach of Afghanistan Cricket Team replacing Pakistan's Inzamam ul Haq with his first outings with the team being a tour of Scotland, Ireland and the Netherlands in July and August of that year. He was chosen ahead of Mohammad Yousuf, Herschelle Gibbs and Corey Collymore Rajput is in line for a two-year contract, but that decision would be finalised after the upcoming tour of Europe.

In July 2016, ACB unveiled a strategic plan and set targets for Afghanistan cricket team to be a top-six ODI team by 2019 and a top-three team in both T20Is and ODIs by 2025. In order to achieve this, ACB created a proposal to be presented to BCCI, to secure annual bilateral matches against India and teams touring India beginning the following year. Shafiq Stanikzai, Chief Executive of ACB, said the draft had been presented to BCCI president Anurag Thakur in May and further discussions occurred during the ICC Annual Conference in Edinburgh in June 2016.

On 25 July 2016, Afghanistan confirmed its first full series against West Indies a top-8 ranked Full member. Its earlier full series came against a permanent member of ICC was against Zimbabwe. Afghanistan toured the Caribbean islands in mid-June 2017 and played 5 ODIs and 3 T20Is.

On the same day, it was announced that Afghanistan would host a full series against Ireland at Greater Noida. Besides a 4-day intercontinental cup match, Ireland and Afghanistan would play five ODIs and three T20Is in March 2017. Afghanistan won the T20I series 3–0 and in the process set a new T20I record of 11 consecutive victories.

On 22 June 2017, the International Cricket Council (ICC) awarded Afghanistan full Test status, along with Ireland. In December 2017, the ICC confirmed that Afghanistan were scheduled to play their first Test against India, in late 2018. According to the ICC Future Tours Programme for 2019–23, Afghanistan are scheduled to play thirteen Tests. In January 2018, both the ACB and the BCCI confirmed the Test would be played in June in Bengaluru.

In June 2018, Afghanistan lost their maiden Test match to hosts India by an innings and 262 runs, despite being able to bowl out a strong Indian team in the first innings.

=== Rise as a Test team ===
In March 2019 against Ireland, Afghanistan achieved their first Test match victory in their only second Test match, becoming the fourth team after Australia, England and Pakistan to win one of their first two Tests.

In September 2019, Afghanistan beat hosts Bangladesh by 224 runs in a one-off Test tour. Rain almost resulted in the match being drawn, but finally the weather cleared, allowing the spin-unit of Afghanistan to take the final four wickets.

=== Taliban takeover ===
In August 2021, concerns and doubts were raised over the participation of the Afghanistan national cricket team in the future international matches after the Taliban retook control of Afghanistan. Concerns were raised over the safety of Afghan national cricketers and their families who were still in Afghanistan during the Taliban takeover on 15 August 2021. As of 31 August 2021, three of the Afghanistan women's national cricket team had evacuated to Canada, while the others were afraid of how they, as women, would be treated by the Taliban. The women's team was effectively disbanded.

Taliban spokesmen stated that the Taliban would not disrupt the men's cricket team's participation in international matches and that they would allow Afghanistan to play its first ever bilateral series against Pakistan in Sri Lanka which was scheduled to start in September 2021. The Pakistan Cricket Board announced in August 2021 that the tour would be rescheduled to 2022. This was later moved to 2023 and the tour took place between 24 – 27 March 2023.

Despite the ICC requirement for member countries to organize a women's national team for full membership status, the Afghanistan men's national team is allowed to still compete.

== Grounds ==
Afghanistan typically do not play their home matches in Afghanistan due to the ongoing security situation and the lack of international standard facilities. Afghanistan played their 'home' Intercontinental Cup fixture against Ireland at the Rangiri Dambulla International Stadium in Sri Lanka. Following Afghanistan's World Twenty20 qualifying campaign they played two One Day Internationals against Canada at the Sharjah Cricket Association Stadium in the UAE.

As plans to resurrect Afghan cricket developed, at least three international standard cricket stadiums have been built in Afghanistan. In 2016, Shahid Vijay Singh Pathik Sports Complex in Greater Noida became the home ground for the Afghanistan national cricket team after they decided to shift their home ground from Sharjah. In June 2018, after acquiring test status, Afghanistan changed their home base to Rajiv Gandhi International Cricket Stadium, Dehradun, India. In May 2019, Afghanistan Cricket Board requested BCCI for a new home stadium. In August 2019, BCCI approved Ekana Cricket Stadium in Lucknow, India as the new home stadium for the team.

The following are the main cricket stadiums in Afghanistan:

- Kabul International Cricket Stadium in Kabul
- Ghazi Amanullah International Cricket Stadium in Ghazi Amanullah Town, Jalalabad
- Ahmad Shahi Stadium in Kandahar
- Kandahar International Cricket Stadium in Kandahar
- Khost Cricket Stadium in Khost
- Najibullah Tarakai Cricket Ground in Nangarhar Province

Secondary Home Grounds (outside Afghanistan)

- Sharjah Cricket Stadium, Sharjah (2010–2016 2024)
- Shaheed Vijay Singh Pathik Sports Complex, Greater Noida (2017–2024)
- Rajiv Gandhi International Cricket Stadium, Dehradun (2018–2019)
- Bharat Ratna Shri Atal Bihari Vajpayee Ekana Cricket Stadium, Lucknow (2019)
- Sheikh Zayed Cricket Stadium, Abu Dhabi (2021)
- West End Park International Cricket Stadium, Doha (2025)

== Team colours ==
The flag of the Islamic Republic of Afghanistan is still used to represent the team in international competitions.

In Test matches, Afghanistan wears cricket whites. Fielders wear a baggy red cap or red sun hat displaying the ACB logo.

In limited-overs cricket, Afghanistan wears a predominantly blue kit with splashes of green, red, black, and, occasionally, yellow. Grey was previously used as the main color between 2012 and 2013. Fielders wear a blue baseball-style cap or red sun hat.

For both Test and limited-overs kits, the ACB logo is featured on the left breast, with the main sponsor logo in the center of the shirt. The secondary sponsor is displayed on the leading sleeve and back of the shirt, with the manufacturer's logo on the non-leading sleeve. For ICC tournaments, the main sponsor logo moves to the leading sleeve.

Previously also red, batters' helmets are blue as of late February 2024, with the Afghanistan tricolor flag displayed above the ACB logo.

The current sponsors are Etisalat and Vany Sports.

== Current squad ==
This lists all the players who have played for Afghanistan in the past 12 months or were named in the most recent Test, ODI or T20I squad. Uncapped players are listed in italics.

Updated: 6 January 2025

Name	Age	Batting style	Bowling style	FC Team	List A Team	T20 Team	Forms	S/N	Captain	Last Test	Last ODI	Last T20I
Batters
Ijaz Ahmad Ahmadzai	23	Right-handed	Right-arm medium	Maiwand Champions	Amo	Amo	T20I	55		—N/a	—N/a	(Ireland) 2024
Sediqullah Atal	25	Left-handed	—N/a	Pamir Legends	Band-e-Amir	Band-e-Amir	Test, ODI, T20I	26		(Zimbabwe) 2024	(Zimbabwe) 2024	(Zimbabwe) 2024
Riaz Hassan	24	Right-handed	—N/a		Pamir Legends	Band-e-Amir	Test, ODI	76		(Zimbabwe) 2025	(South Africa) 2024	—N/a
Abdul Malik	28	Right-handed	Right-arm off break	Mah-e-Par Stars	Amo	Amo	Test, ODI	20		(Zimbabwe) 2025	(Zimbabwe) 2024	—N/a
Bahir Shah	26	Right-handed	Right-arm off break	Hindukush Strikers	Speen-Ghar	Speen-Ghar	Test	86		(Bangladesh) 2023	—N/a	—N/a
Rahmat Shah	33	Right-handed	Right-arm leg break	Mis Ainak	Pamir Legends	Boost	Test, ODI	8	Test, ODI (C)	(Zimbabwe) 2025	(Zimbabwe) 2024	(India) 2024
Hashmatullah Shahidi	32	Left-handed	Right-arm off break	Band-e-Amir	Maiwand Defenders	Band-e-Amir	Test, ODI	50		(Zimbabwe) 2025	(Zimbabwe) 2024	(Ireland) 2022
Ibrahim Zadran	24	Right-handed	Right-arm medium-fast	Mis Ainak	Hindukush Strikers	Mis Ainak	Test, ODI, T20I	18	T20I (C)	(Ireland) 2024	(Ireland) 2024	(South Africa) 2024
Hazratullah Zazai	28	Left-handed	—N/a		Pamir Legends	Boost	T20I	3		—N/a	(Cricket West Indies) 2019	(Zimbabwe) 2024
All-rounders
Ismat Alam	24	Right-handed	Right-arm fast-medium	Speen-Ghar	Speen-Ghar	Speen-Ghar	Test			(Zimbabwe) 2025	—N/a	—N/a
Karim Janat	28	Right-handed	Right-arm medium	Band-e-Amir	Band-e-Amir	Band-e-Amir	Test, T20I	11		(Ireland) 2024	(Sri Lanka) 2023	(Zimbabwe) 2024
Nangeyalia Kharote	22	Left-handed	Slow left-arm orthodox	Hindukush Strikers	Boost	Boost	ODI, T20I	12		—N/a	(Ireland) 2024	(South Africa) 2024
Mohammad Nabi	41	Right-handed	Right-arm off break			Kabul Eagles	ODI, T20I	7		(Bangladesh) 2019	(Zimbabwe) 2024	(Zimbabwe) 2024
Gulbadin Naib	35	Right-handed	Right-arm medium-fast		Pamir Legends	Amo	ODI, T20I	14		—N/a	(Bangladesh) 2024	(Zimbabwe) 2024
Azmatullah Omarzai	26	Right-handed	Right-arm medium-fast		Maiwand Defenders	Kabul Eagles	Test, ODI, T20I	9		(Zimbabwe) 2024	(Zimbabwe) 2024	(Zimbabwe) 2024
Shahidullah	27	Left-handed	Slow left-arm orthodox	Speen-Ghar		Amo	Test			(Zimbabwe) 2025	(Sri Lanka) 2023	(India) 2023
Wicket-keepers
Ikram Alikhil	26	Left-handed	—N/a	Band-e-Amir	Maiwand Defenders	Band-e-Amir	Test, ODI	46		(Sri Lanka) 2024	(Zimbabwe) 2024	—N/a
Rahmanullah Gurbaz	24	Right-handed	—N/a	Kabul	Mis Ainak	Kabul Eagles	Test, ODI, T20I	21		(Ireland) 2024	(Bangladesh) 2024	(Zimbabwe) 2024
Mohammad Ishaq	21	Right-handed	—N/a	Mah-e-Par Stars	Boost	Amo	T20I	27		—N/a	—N/a	(Zimbabwe) 2024
Afsar Zazai	33	Right-handed	—N/a			Mis Ainak Knights	Test	40		(Zimbabwe) 2025	(Cricket West Indies) 2017	(India) 2023
Spin Bowlers
Noor Ahmad	21	Right-handed	Left-arm wrist spin		Mis Ainak	Band-e-Amir Dragons	ODI, T20I	15		—N/a	(Ireland) 2024	(Sri Lanka) 2024
Qais Ahmad	26	Right-handed bat	Right-arm leg break		Maiwand Defenders	Speen-Ghar	T20I	32		(Sri Lanka) 2024	(Sri Lanka) 2024	(Sri Lanka) 2024
Allah Mohammad Ghazanfar	19	Right-handed	Right-arm off break		Junior Champions	Mis Ainak Knights	Test, ODI	70		(Zimbabwe) 2024	(Zimbabwe) 2024	—N/a
Rashid Khan	28	Right-handed	Right-arm leg break			Band-e-Amir Dragons	Test, ODI, T20I	19		(Zimbabwe) 2025	(Zimbabwe) 2024	(Zimbabwe) 2024
Zahir Khan	27	Left-handed	Left-arm wrist spin	Maiwand Champions	Mis Ainak	Amo	Test	75		(Zimbabwe) 2024	(Ireland) 2019	(India) 2023
Mujeeb Ur Rahman	25	Right-handed	Right-arm off break		Hindukush Stars	Hindukush Stars	T20I	88		(India) 2018	(South Africa) 2023	(Zimbabwe) 2024
Zia-ur-Rehman	28	Right-handed	Slow left-arm orthodox	Mah-e-Par Stars	Mis Ainak	Mis Ainak	Test	22		(Zimbabwe) 2025	(Bangladesh) 2023	—N/a
Pace Bowlers
Fareed Ahmad	32	Left-handed	Left-arm fast-medium		Pamir Legends	Speen-Ghar	Test, ODI, T20I	56		(Zimbabwe) 2025	(Zimbabwe) 2024	(Zimbabwe) 2024
Yamin Ahmadzai	34	Right-handed	Right-arm medium-fast	Maiwand Champions		Speen-Ghar	Test			(Zimbabwe) 2025	—N/a	—N/a
Fazalhaq Farooqi	26	Right-handed	Left-arm fast-medium		Amo	Boost Defenders	ODI, T20I	5		—N/a	(Zimbabwe) 2024	(Zimbabwe) 2024
Wafadar Momand	26	Right-handed	Right-arm medium		Band-e-Amir	Band-e-Amir	T20I	14		(Ireland) 2019	—N/a	(Sri Lanka) 2024
Nijat Masood	27	Right-handed	Right-arm medium	Mah-e-Par Stars	Band-e-Amir	Band-e-Amir	Test	12		(Ireland) 2024	—N/a	(Zimbabwe) 2022
Bilal Sami	24	Right-handed	Right-arm fast	Maiwand Champions	Amo	Band-e-Amir	ODI	68		—N/a	(Zimbabwe) 2024	—N/a
Naveen-ul-Haq	27	Right-handed	Right-arm medium-fast			Kabul Eagles	T20I	78		—N/a	(South Africa) 2023	(Zimbabwe) 2024
Naveed Zadran	21	Right-handed	Right-arm medium	Hindukush Strikers	Mis Ainak	Mis Ainak	Test, ODI	58		(Zimbabwe) 2024	(Zimbabwe) 2024	—N/a

== Coaching staff ==
Position	Name
Director of cricket	Raees Ahmadzai
Head coach	Richard Pybus
Batting coach	Toby Radford
Fast bowling coach	Hamid Hassan
Spin bowling coach	Vacant
Fielding coach	John Mooney
Strength and conditioning coach	Robert Ahmun

== Records ==
International match summary – Afghanistan

Last updated 17 November 2026.

Playing record
Format	M	W	L	T	D/NR	Inaugural match
Tests	16	4	9	0	3	14 June 2018
One-Day Internationals	191	96	88	1	6	19 April 2009
Twenty20 Internationals	171	102	65	3	1	1 February 2010

=== Test matches ===
- Highest team total: 699 v. Zimbabwe, 30 December 2024 at Queens Sports Club, Bulawayo
- Lowest team total: 103 v. India, 14 June 2018 at M. Chinnaswamy Stadium, Bangalore

Most Test runs for Afghanistan

Player	Runs	Average	Career span
Rahmat Shah	1,432	53.03	2018–2026
Hashmatullah Shahidi	903	39.26	2018–2026
Ibrahim Zadran	602	37.62	2019–2025
Afsar Zazai	528	29.33	2018–2026
Asghar Afghan	440	44.00	2018–2021

Most Test wickets for Afghanistan

Player	Wickets	Average	Career span
Rashid Khan	45	20.44	2018–2025
Yamin Ahmadzai	24	33.83	2018–2026
Mohammad Saleem	19	32.94	2024–2026
Amir Hamza	18	29.72	2019–2023
Zia-ur-Rehman	17	53.52	2024–2026

Highest Test scores for Afghanistan

Player	Runs	Opposition	Venue	Year
Hashmatullah Shahidi	246	Zimbabwe	Queens Sports Club, Bulawayo	2024
Rahmat Shah	234	Zimbabwe	Queens Sports Club, Bulawayo	2024
Hashmatullah Shahidi	200*	Zimbabwe	Sheikh Zayed Cricket Stadium, Abu Dhabi	2021
Asghar Afghan	164	Zimbabwe	Sheikh Zayed Cricket Stadium, Abu Dhabi	2021
Ibrahim Zadran	114	Sri Lanka	Singhalese Sports Club Cricket Ground, Colombo	2024

Best Test bowling figures for Afghanistan

Bowler	Figures	Opposition	Venue	Year
Rashid Khan	7/137	Zimbabwe	Sheikh Zayed Cricket Stadium, Abu Dhabi	2021
Ziaur Rahman	7/97	Zimbabwe	Harare Sports Club, Harare	2025
Rashid Khan	6/49	Bangladesh	Zahur Ahmed Chowdhury Stadium, Chittagong	2019
Amir Hamza	6/75	Zimbabwe	Sheikh Zayed Cricket Stadium, Abu Dhabi	2021
Rashid Khan	5/55	Bangladesh	Zahur Ahmed Chowdhury Stadium, Chittagong	2019

==== Test record versus other nations ====
Opponent	Matches	Won	Lost	Draw	Tied	% Won	First	Last
Bangladesh	3	1	1	1	0	33.33	2019	2026
India	2	0	2	0	0	0.00	2018	2026
Ireland	2	1	1	0	0	50.00	2019	2024
Sri Lanka	1	0	1	0	0	0.00	2024	2024
West Indies	1	0	1	0	0	0.00	2019	2019
Zimbabwe	8	2	3	3	0	28.57	2021	2026
Total	16	4	9	3	0	25.00	2018	2026
Statistics are correct as of Afghanistan v Bangladesh at Sharjah Cricket Stadium, Sharjah, First Test, 13–17 November 2026

=== One-Day Internationals ===
- Highest team total: 343/9 v. Ireland, 12 August 2026 at Belfast
- Lowest team 58 v. Zimbabwe, 2 January 2016 at Sharjah

Most ODI runs for Afghanistan

Player	Runs	Average	Career span
Rahmat Shah	4,417	36.20	2013–2026
Mohammad Nabi	3,801	27.34	2009–2026
Hashmatullah Shahidi	2,752	34.40	2013–2026
Mohammad Shahzad	2,727	33.66	2009–2019
Asghar Afghan	2,424	24.73	2009–2021

Most ODI wickets for Afghanistan

Player	Wickets	Average	Career span
Rashid Khan	237	18.90	2015–2026
Mohammad Nabi	181	32.61	2009–2026
Dawlat Zadran	115	29.76	2011–2019
Mujeeb Ur Rahman	101	28.34	2017–2023
Gulbadin Naib	73	35.86	2011–2024

Highest ODI scores for Afghanistan

Player	Runs	Opposition	Venue	Year
Ibrahim Zadran	177	England	Gadaffi Stadium, Lahore, Pakistan	2025
Ibrahim Zadran	162	Sri Lanka	Pallekele International Cricket Stadium, Pallekele	2022
Rahmanullah Gurbaz	151	Pakistan	Mahinda Rajapaksa International Cricket Stadium, Sooriyawewa	2023
Azmatullah Omarzai	149*	Sri Lanka	Pallekele International Cricket Stadium, Pallekele	2024
Rahmanullah Gurbaz	145	Bangladesh	Zohur Ahmed Chowdhury Stadium, Chittagong	2023

Best ODI bowling figures for Afghanistan

Bowler	Figures	Opposition	Venue	Year
Rashid Khan	7/18	West Indies	Darren Sammy National Cricket Stadium, Gros Islet	2017
AM Ghazanfar	6/26	Bangladesh	Sharjah Cricket Stadium, Sharjah	2024
Rashid Khan	6/34	Ireland	Bready Cricket Club Ground, Magheramason	2026
Rashid Khan	6/43	Ireland	Greater Noida Sports Complex Ground, Greater Noida	2017
Gulbadin Naib	6/43	Ireland	Stormont Cricket Ground, Belfast	2019

==== ODI record versus other nations ====
Opponent	Matches	Won	Lost	Tied	No Result	% Won	First	Last
Full Members
Australia	5	0	4	0	1	0.00	2012	2025
Bangladesh	23	12	11	0	0	52.17	2014	2026
England	4	2	2	0	0	50.00	2015	2025
India	7	0	6	1	0	0.00	2014	2026
Ireland	36	22	13	0	1	62.85	2010	2026
New Zealand	3	0	3	0	0	0.00	2015	2023
Pakistan	8	1	7	0	0	12.50	2012	2023
South Africa	6	2	4	0	0	33.33	2019	2025
Sri Lanka	15	4	10	0	1	28.57	2014	2024
West Indies	9	3	5	0	1	37.50	2017	2019
Zimbabwe	33	22	10	0	1	68.75	2014	2026
Associate Members
Canada	5	4	1	0	0	80.00	2010	2011
Hong Kong	2	1	1	0	0	50.00	2014	2018
Kenya	6	4	2	0	0	66.66	2010	2013
Netherlands	10	8	2	0	0	80.00	2009	2023
Scotland	13	8	4	0	1	66.66	2009	2019
United Arab Emirates	6	3	3	0	0	50.00	2014	2018
Total	191	96	88	1	6	52.16	2009	2026
Statistics are correct as of Afghanistan v Zimbabwe at Sharjah Cricket Stadium, Sharjah; 23 October 2026

=== Twenty20 Internationals ===
- 12 consecutive wins, a record in the men's T20Is (5 February 2018 – 15 September 2019).
- Lowest team total: 56 v. South Africa, 26 June 2024, at Tarouba
- Highest individual score: 162*, Hazratullah Zazai v. Ireland, 23 February 2019, at Dehradun
- Best individual bowling figures: 5/3, Rashid Khan v. Ireland, 10 March 2017 at Greater Noida

Most T20I runs for Afghanistan

Player	Runs	Average	Career span
Mohammad Nabi	2,509	22.20	2010–2026
Rahmanullah Gurbaz	2,313	25.14	2019–2026
Mohammad Shahzad	2,048	29.25	2010–2023
Ibrahim Zadran	1,969	32.27	2019–2026
Najibullah Zadran	1,830	29.51	2012–2024

Most T20I wickets for Afghanistan

Player	Wickets	Average	Career span
Rashid Khan	198	13.99	2015–2026
Mohammad Nabi	111	28.18	2010–2026
Mujeeb Ur Rahman	89	19.58	2018–2026
Fazalhaq Farooqi	70	20.52	2021–2026
Naveen-ul-Haq	67	18.73	2019–2024

==== T20I record versus other nations ====
Opponent	Matches	Won	Lost	Tied	No Result	% Won	First	Last
Full Members
Australia	2	1	1	0	0	50.00	2022	2024
Bangladesh	16	7	9	0	0	43.75	2014	2025
England	3	0	3	0	0	0.00	2012	2022
India	12	0	10	1	1	4.50	2010	2026
Ireland	26	18	7	1	0	71.15	2010	2024
New Zealand	3	1	2	0	0	33.34	2021	2026
Pakistan	10	4	6	0	0	40.00	2013	2025
South Africa	4	0	3	1	0	0.00	2010	2026
Sri Lanka	9	3	6	0	0	33.33	2016	2025
West Indies	11	5	6	0	0	45.45	2016	2026
Zimbabwe	24	22	2	0	0	91.66	2015	2026
Associate Members
Canada	3	3	0	0	0	100	2010	2026
Hong Kong	6	4	2	0	0	66.66	2014	2025
Japan	1	1	0	0	0	100	2026	
Kenya	3	2	1	0	0	66.66	2013	2013
Namibia	1	1	0	0	0	100	2021	2021
Nepal	2	0	2	0	0	0.00	2014	2026
Netherlands	4	2	2	0	0	50.00	2010	2015
Oman	5	5	0	0	0	100	2016	2022
Papua New Guinea	2	2	0	0	0	100	2015	2024
Qatar	1	1	0	0	0	100	2025	2025
Scotland	7	7	0	0	0	100	2010	2021
United Arab Emirates	15	12	3	0	0	80.00	2015	2026
Uganda	1	1	0	0	0	100	2024	2024
Total	171	102	66	3	1	60.88	2010	2026
Statistics are correct as of Afghanistan v Zimbabwe at Sharjah Cricket Stadium, Sharjah, 1 November 2026

== Tournament history ==
=== ICC Cricket World Cup ===
Year	Round	Played	Won	Tied	Lost	Captain
(England) 1975	Not eligible – not an ICC Member					
(England) 1979	Not eligible – not an ICC Member					
(England) (Wales) 1983	Not eligible – not an ICC Member					
(India) (Pakistan) 1987	Not eligible – not an ICC Member					
(Australia) (New Zealand) 1992	Not eligible – not an ICC Member					
(India) (Pakistan) (Sri Lanka) 1996	Not eligible – not an ICC Member					
(England) (Wales) (Scotland) (Republic of Ireland) (Netherlands) 1999	Not eligible – not an ICC Member					
(South Africa) (Zimbabwe) (Kenya) 2003	Not an ICC Member at time of qualifying					
(Cricket West Indies) 2007	Did not qualify					
(India) (Sri Lanka) (Bangladesh) 2011	Did not qualify					
(Australia) (New Zealand) 2015	Group stage	6	1	0	5	Mohammad Nabi
(England) (Wales) 2019	Group stage	9	0	0	9	Gulbadin Naib
(India) 2023	Group stage	9	4	0	5	Hashmatullah Shahidi
(South Africa) (Zimbabwe) (Namibia) 2027	TBD					
(India) (Bangladesh) 2031	TBD					
Total		24	5	0	19	–

=== ICC World Cup qualifiers ===
ICC World Cup qualification records
Year	Round	Position	GP	W	L	T	NR
(Republic of Ireland) 2005	Did not qualify						
(South Africa) 2009	DNQ	5/12	12	5	7	0	0
(Zimbabwe) 2018	Qualified	1/10	9	4	5	0	0
Total	2/5	1 Title	21	9	12	0	0

=== ICC T20 World Cup ===
ICC T20 World Cup records
Year	Round	Position	GP	W	L	T	NR
(South Africa) 2007	Did not qualify						
(England) 2009	Did not qualify						
(Cricket West Indies) 2010	Group Stage	12/12	2	0	2	0	0
(Sri Lanka) 2012	Group Stage	11/12	2	0	2	0	0
(Bangladesh) 2014	Group Stage	14/16	3	1	2	0	0
(India) 2016	Super 10	9/16	7	4	3	0	0
(United Arab Emirates) (Oman) 2021	Super 12	7/16	5	2	3	0	0
(Australia) 2022	Super 12	12/16	5	0	3	0	2
(Cricket West Indies) (United States) 2024	Semi-finals	3/20	8	5	3	0	0
(India) (Sri Lanka) 2026	Group Stage	10/20	4	2	2	0	0
(Australia) (New Zealand) 2028	Qualified						
(England) (Wales) (Republic of Ireland) (Scotland) 2030	TBD						
Total	Semi-finals	3rd	36	14	20	0	2

=== ICC Champions Trophy ===
ICC Champions Trophy records
Year	Round	Position	GP	W	L	T	NR
(Bangladesh) 1998	Not an ICC member						
(Kenya) 2000	Not an ICC member						
(Sri Lanka) 2002	Not an ICC member						
(England) 2004	Did not qualify						
(India) 2006	Did not qualify						
(South Africa) 2009	Did not qualify						
(England) (Wales) 2013	Did not qualify						
(England) (Wales) 2017	Did not qualify						
(Pakistan) (United Arab Emirates) 2025	Group Stage	5/8	3	1	1	0	1
(India) 2029	To be determined						
Total	1/9	0 Title	3	1	1	0	1

=== ICC T20 World Cup qualifiers ===
ICC T20 World Cup qualification records
Year	Round	Position	GP	W	L	T	NR
(Republic of Ireland) 2009	Not eligible, not an ODI nation at time of tournament						
(United Arab Emirates) 2010	Qualified	1/8	7	6	1	0	0
(United Arab Emirates) 2012	Qualified	2/16	9	8	1	0	0
(Bangladesh) 2013	Qualified	2/16	9	7	2	0	0
(Republic of Ireland) (Scotland) 2015	Qualified	5/14	8	4	2	0	2
Total	4/5	1 Title	33	25	6	0	2

=== ICC Intercontinental Cup ===
ICC Intercontinental Cup records
Host/Year	Round	Position	GP	W	L	D	NR
Various 2009–10	Champion	1/7	7	6	0	1	0
Various 2011–13	Runners-up	2/8	8	5	1	2	0
Various 2015–17	Champion	1/8	7	6	0	1	0
Total	3/3	2 Titles	22	17	1	4	0

=== ICC World Cricket League Division Five ===
ICC World Cricket League Division Five records
Year	Round	Position	GP	W	L	T	NR
(Jersey) 2008	Champion	1/12	7	5	0	1	1
Total	1/6	1 Title	7	5	0	1	1

=== ICC World Cricket League Division Four ===
ICC World Cricket League Division Four records
Year	Round	Position	GP	W	L	T	NR
(Tanzania) 2008	Champion	1/6	6	6	0	0	0
Total	1/6	1 Title	6	6	0	0	0

=== ICC World Cricket League Division Three ===
ICC World Cricket League Division Three records
Year	Round	Position	GP	W	L	T	NR
(Argentina) 2009	Champion	1/6	5	4	1	0	0
Total	1/7	1 Title	5	4	1	0	0

=== ICC World Cricket League Division One ===
ICC World Cricket League Division One records
Host/Year	Round	Position	GP	W	L	T	NR
(Netherlands) 2010	3rd-place	3/6	6	3	3	0	0
Total	1/6	0 Title	6	3	3	0	0

=== ICC World Cricket League Championship ===
World Cricket League Championship records
Year	Round	Position	GP	W	L	T	NR
(Republic of Ireland) 2011–13	Runners-up	2/8	14	9	4	0	1
Total	1/4	1 Title	14	9	4	0	1

=== Asian Games ===
Asian Games records
Year	Round	Position	GP	W	L	T	NR
(China) 2010	Silver Medal	2/9	3	2	1	0	0
(South Korea) 2014	Silver Medal	2/10	3	2	1	0	0
(China) 2022	Silver Medal	2/14	3	2	0	0	1
(Japan) 2026	Quarter-finals	7/10	3	1	1	0	1
Total	4/4	0 Title	12	7	3	0	2

=== ACC Asia Cup ===
ACC Asia Cup records
Year	Round	Position	GP	W	L	T	NR
(United Arab Emirates) 1984	Not eligible — Not an ICC Member						
(Sri Lanka) 1986	Not eligible — Not an ICC Member						
(Bangladesh) 1988	Not eligible — Not an ICC Member						
(India) 1990–91	Not eligible — Not an ICC Member						
(United Arab Emirates) 1995	Not eligible — Not an ICC Member						
(Sri Lanka) 1997	Not eligible — Not an ICC Member						
(Bangladesh) 2000	Not eligible — Not an ICC Member						
(Sri Lanka) 2004	Did not qualify						
(Pakistan) 2008	Did not qualify						
(Sri Lanka) 2010	Did not qualify						
(Bangladesh) 2012	Did not qualify						
(Bangladesh) 2014	Group stage	4/5	4	1	3	0	0
(Bangladesh) 2016	Did not qualify						
(United Arab Emirates) 2018	Super Fours	4/6	5	2	2	1	0
(United Arab Emirates) 2022	Super Fours	4/6	5	2	3	0	0
(Pakistan) (Sri Lanka) 2023	Group Stage	5/6	2	0	2	0	0
(United Arab Emirates) 2025	Group Stage	5/8	3	1	2	0	0
Total	5/17	0 Title	19	6	12	1	0

=== ACC Trophy ===
ACC Trophy records
Year	Round	Position	GP	W	L	T	NR
(Malaysia) 1996	Not eligible, not an ACC Member.						
(Nepal) 1998	Not eligible, not an ACC Member.						
(United Arab Emirates) 2000	Not eligible, not an ACC Member.						
(Singapore) 2002	Not eligible, not an ACC Member.						
(Nepal) 2004	Quarter-finals	6/15	6	2	4	0	0
(United Arab Emirates) 2006	Quarter-finals	3/17	6	5	1	0	0
(Malaysia) 2008	Semi-finals	3/10	6	4	2	0	0
(Kuwait) 2010	Champion	1/10	6	5	1	0	0
(Nepal) 2012	Did not participate						
(Malaysia) 2014	Champion	1/6	5	4	1	0	0
Total	5/10	2 Titles	29	20	9	0	0

=== ACC Twenty20 Cup ===
ACC Twenty20 Cup records
Year Host	Round	Position	GP	W	L	T	NR
(Kuwait) 2007	Joint Champion with Oman	1/10	6	4	1	1	0
(United Arab Emirates) 2009	Champion	1/12	7	7	0	0	0
(Nepal) 2011	Champion	1/10	6	6	0	0	0
(Nepal) 2013	Champion	1/10	6	5	1	0	0
(United Arab Emirates) 2015	Did not participate						
Total	4/5	4 Titles	25	22	2	1	0

== Honours ==
=== Others ===
- Asian Games
  - Silver Medal (3): 2010, 2014, 2022

== See also ==
- Cricket in Afghanistan
- Afghanistan at the Cricket World Cup
- Afghanistan women's national cricket team
- List of Afghanistan Test cricketers
- List of Afghanistan ODI cricketers
- List of Afghanistan T20I cricketers
- List of Afghanistan first-class cricketers
- Afghan national cricket captains
- List of Afghanistan Twenty20 International cricket records
- Afghanistan A cricket team
- Out of the Ashes (2010 film), a 2010 documentary film
- Afghanistan–Pakistan cricket rivalry

== Notes ==
Preceded by Ireland	Test match playing teams 14 June 2018	Succeeded by None
