= Afghanistan Cricket Board =

Governing body of cricket in Afghanistan

- Sport: Cricket
- Jurisdiction: Afghanistan
- Abbreviation: ACB
- Founded: 1995; 31 years ago
- Affiliation: International Cricket Council
- Affiliation date: June 27, 2017; 9 years ago
- Regional affiliation: Asian Cricket Council
- Affiliation date: 2001; 25 years ago
- Location: Kabul International Cricket Stadium; Kabul
- Chairman: (Afghanistan) Mirwais Ashraf
- CEO: (Afghanistan) Naseeb Khan
- Coach: (England) Jonathan Trott
- Sponsor: Etisalat, Afghanistan National Television, FanCode, CricHeroes, Kardan University, RANA Technologies Ariana Afghan Airlines, Amul, TYKA Sports

Official website
- cricket.af
- (Afghanistan)

The Afghanistan Cricket Board ACB (Note: |Pashto: د افغانستان کرکټ بورډ |Dari: کرکت بورد افغانستان) (formerly Afghanistan Cricket Federation ACF) is the official governing body of cricket in Afghanistan. Founded in 1995, it is Afghanistan's representative body at the International Cricket Council (ICC) where it has been a full member since 2017. It is also a member of the Asian Cricket Council.

== History ==
Cricket in Afghanistan was first played during the 19th century Anglo-Afghan Wars, with British troops reported as having played in Kabul in 1839. However, unlike many countries, no lasting cricket legacy was left by the British, and it would be more than a hundred years before cricket returned.

In the 1990s, cricket became popular amongst Afghan refugees in Pakistan, and the Afghanistan Cricket Federation was formed there in 1995. They continued to play cricket on their return to their home country in late 2001. Like all sports, cricket was originally banned by the ruling Taliban, but it became a notable exception in 2000 and the Afghanistan Cricket Federation was elected as an affiliate member of the ICC the following year.

The Afghanistan national cricket team's 21-run win over Namibia in Krugersdorp earned them official One Day International status in April 2009. The team qualified for the 2012 ICC Under-19 Cricket World Cup.

On 11 November 2010, the Afghanistan women's national cricket team was formed. This was intended to help women understand the game of cricket and have a parallel team to that of the men. The team folded in 2014 due to a lack of support from the ACB, as well as threats from the Taliban. An attempt at reforming the team was made in 2020, but all 25 players were forced to flee the country when the Taliban took control of Afghanistan in 2021. As of 2024, the ACB has no plans to reform a women's side, and has avoided contact with the players who fled the country.

In July 2016, ACB unveiled a strategic plan and set targets for Afghanistan to be a top-six ODI team by 2019 and a top-three team in both T20Is and ODIs by 2025. In order to achieve this, ACB created a proposal to be presented to BCCI, in the works to secure annual bilateral matches against India and teams touring India beginning next year. Shafiq Stanikzai, Chief Executive of ACB, said the draft had been presented to BCCI president Anurag Thakur in May and further discussions had happened during the ICC Annual Conference in Edinburgh in June 2016.

On 22 June 2017, Afghanistan was granted Test nation status by the ICC. This was the first time in history that two teams earned test status at the same time. Afghanistan share this honour with Ireland, thus bringing the number of total number of test playing nations to twelve. On 14 June 2018, they played their first test match against India, which they lost within two days.

In August 2021, Taliban leaders arrived to the ACB headquarters accompanied by former Afghan national cricketer Abdullah Mazari, and ordered the cricket board to carry on the activities as usual.

== Domestic competitions ==
First class

- Ahmad Shah Abdali 4-day Tournament
- Mirwais Nika 3-Day Tournament

List A

- Ghazi Amanullah Khan Regional One Day Tournament
- Green Afghanistan One Day Cup

T20

- Shpageeza Cricket League
- Qosh Tepa National T20 Cup

Afghanistan's domestic structure consisted of a 25-over Inter-Provincial Tournament, which had the participation of 22 provinces in the tournament. The aim of the tournament was to spread the game across the country and to generate a greater depth of talent for the national team to select from. The best players from the tournament were selected for Afghanistan-A and under-19 teams based on their performance and would be sent for training and coaching to Bangladesh. Afghanistan teams often visit Pakistan.In February 2013, the Afghanistan national cricket team traveled to Pakistan for a series of List A and T20 matches.

Two teams from the 12-team first round will advance to the next round. The top six from the tournament will then contest Afghanistan's main domestic event - a 50 over tournament in Kabul in May 2010. The 50 over tournament was won by Kabul Province.

Starting in 2011, Afghanistan's domestic cricket structure has grown. The expanded Inter-Provincial Tournament was reorganized into a 50 over tournament and divided into a Challenge Cup section (the Etisalat ODN Challenge Cup with 20 provincial teams) and an Elite Cup section (with 12 provincial teams; 4 of them qualifiers from the Challenge Cup section). In addition to the Inter-Provincial cricket the Afghanistan Cricket Board (ACB) has divided the provinces of Afghanistan into 5 Cricket Regions to enable the better management of the game. The Regions are Amo in the north (centered on Balkh), Spin Ghar in the east (centered on Nangarhar), Band-e-Amir in the centre (centered on Kabul), Mis Ainak in the southeast (centered on Khost), and Boost in the west and southwest (centered on Kandahar). The 5 regions in turn have representative teams which play in all traditional 3 formats of cricket; the Ahmad Shah Abdali One-Day Tournament, Ahmad Shah Abdali T20 Tournament and Ahmad Shah Abdali 4-day Tournament.

In addition to an expansion of the inter-provincial tournament from 25-over matches to 50-over matches and the addition of the T-20 and multi-day formats, cricket in Afghanistan has now expanded across the provinces as well; 32 of the 34 provinces now have representatives sides All provinces except Daykundi and Farah have a representative team, while the ACB recognizes Afghan Refugees and Kochain as provincial teams. There are also plans to expand the three-day league competition into a four-day league in 2014.

The UAE-based telecommunications company, Etisalat is now one of the main sponsors of Afghanistan's cricket, including being the then title sponsor in Afghanistan's division 2 inter-provincinal challenge cup and the Etisalat Sixes T20 Tournament, which is now sponsored by Afghan company called "Alokozay" Shpageeza Cricket League.

=== Regional domestic teams ===
Provinces of Regional Cricket Teams in Afghanistan Amo (Navy) Band-e-Amir (Green) Boost (Orange) Hindukush (Yellow) Kabul (Blue) Mis Ainak (Brown) Pamir (Red) Speen Ghar (Grey)

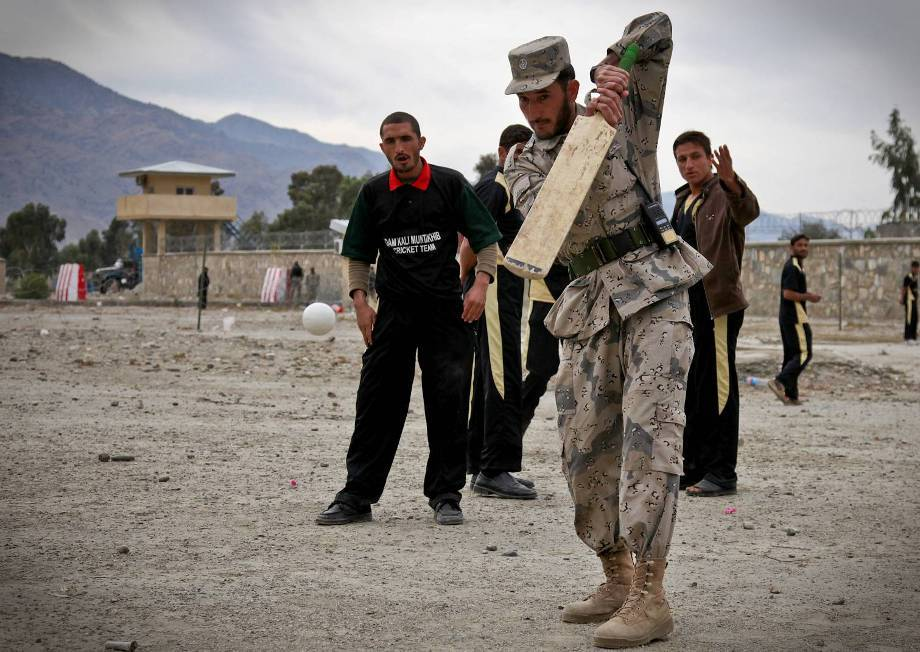
A member of the Afghan Border Police plays cricket after the ground breaking ceremony for the Ghulam Mohammad Sports Complex in Kunar Province.

- Region: Amo
  - Balkh Province
  - Faryab Province
  - Jowzjan Province
  - Samangan Province
  - Sar-e Pol Province
- Region: Band-e-Amir
  - Ghazni Province
  - Bamyan Province
  - Daykundi Province
  - Maidan Wardak Province
- Region: Boost
  - Kandahar Province
  - Helmand Province
  - Nimruz Province
  - Uruzgan Province
  - Zabul Province
- Region: Hindukush
  - Herat Province
  - Badghis Province
  - Farah Province
  - Ghor Province
- Region: Mis Ainak
  - Khost Province
  - Logar Province
  - Paktia Province
  - Paktika Province
- Region: Pamir
  - Kunduz Province
  - Badakhshan Province
  - Baghlan Province
  - Panjshir Province
  - Parwan Province
  - Takhar Province
- Region: Speenghar
  - Nangarhar Province
  - Kapisa Province
  - Kunar Province
  - Laghman Province
  - Nuristan Province
- Region: Kabul

==== Regional Team ====
- Band-e-Amir Region
- Amo Region
- Mis Ainak Region
- Speenghar Region
- Boost Region

== Cricket grounds in Afghanistan ==
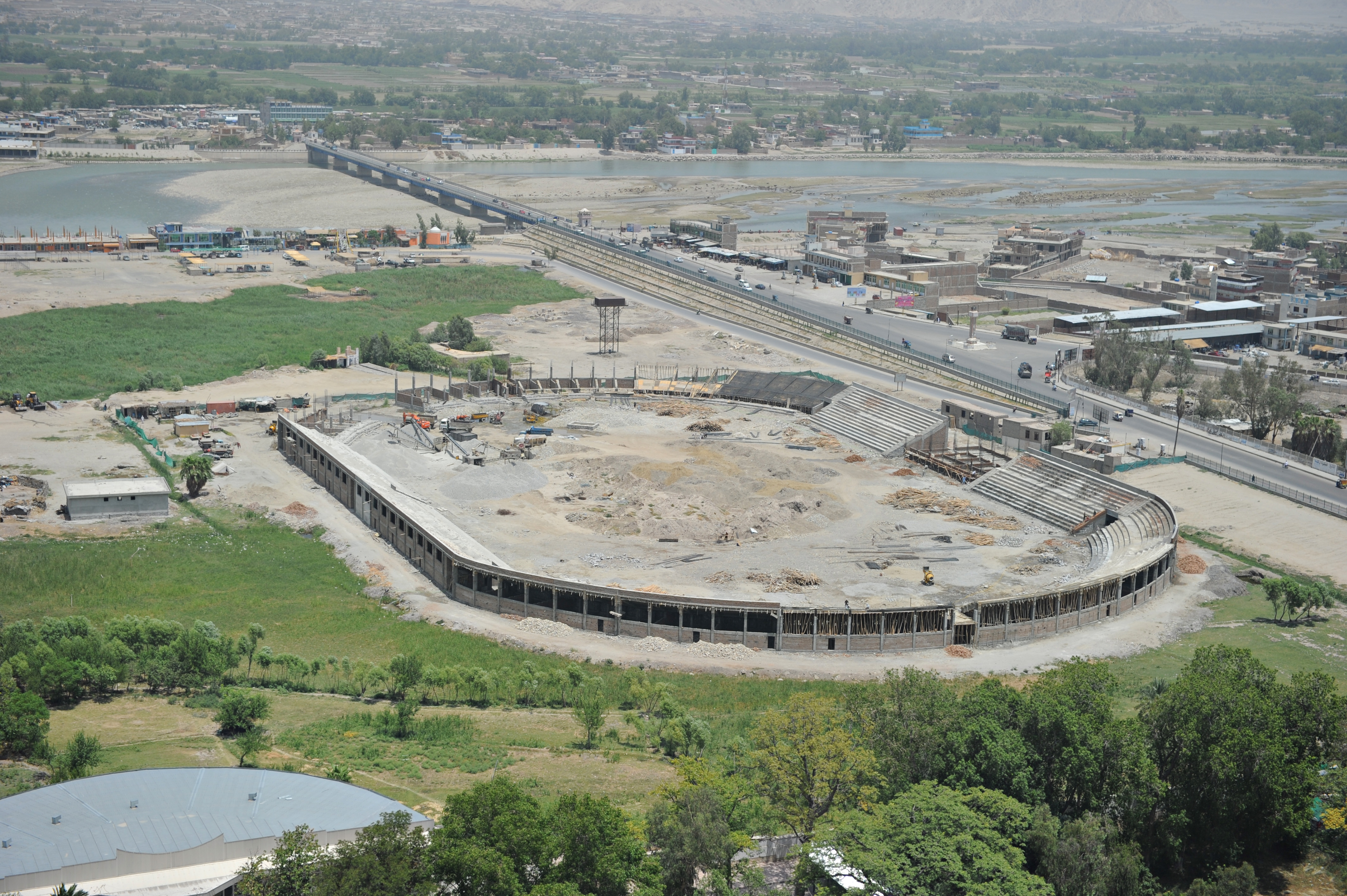
The Sherzai Cricket Stadium in Jalalabad, under construction, in June 2011.

The Afghan national cricket team does not play its home matches inside Afghanistan due to the ongoing security situation and the lack of international standard facilities. Afghanistan played their 'home' Intercontinental Cup fixture against Ireland at the Rangiri Dambulla International Stadium in Sri Lanka. Following Afghanistan's World Twenty20 qualifying campaign they played two One-Day Internationals against Canada at the Sharjah Cricket Association Stadium in the UAE, after which the stadium was named the 'home' ground of Afghanistan.

The President of the Afghanistan Cricket Board, Omar Zakhilwal, announced in October 2010 that the government was planning to construct standard cricket grounds in all 34 provinces in the next two years.

=== Other Home grounds for the Afghan National Team ===
In January 2021, the Afghanistan Cricket Board made announcement of exploring the possibility of using Oman as a new 'home' venue for international cricket matches.

== National team ==
The Afghanistan national cricket team represents the country of Afghanistan in international cricket matches. The national team was formed in 2001, which played in the 2009 World Cup Qualifier after rising rapidly through the World Cricket League, starting in Division Five in May 2008. They play in the Elite division of the ACC Trophy.

Afghanistan's 21-run win over Namibia in Krugersdorp earned them official One Day International status. Afghanistan won their first One Day International against Scotland. In 2011, the team qualified for the 2012 ICC Under-19 Cricket World Cup.

Afghanistan played its first 50 over World Cup in 2015. It played 6 matches in all and won 1 match (against Scotland) and losing the rest. Afghanistan has played in 3 T20 World Cups, 2010, 2012, and 2014. They also qualified for ICC World T20-2016.

In December 2015, Afghanistan hired the services of Manoj Prabhakar, the former Indian all rounder as their bowling coach.

The Afghanistan Cricket Board previously attempted to form a women's national cricket team which was first organized in 2010. Due to the Taliban takeover of Afghanistan, all 25 players were forced to flee the country. As of 2024, there are no plans for the ACB to reform the team.

== See also ==
- Afghanistan Premier League
- Cricket in Afghanistan
- Out of the Ashes, a documentary of the Afghanistan national cricket team's qualification for the 2010 ICC World Twenty20 tournament
