= 2025 Shpageeza Cricket League =

10 edition of Shpageeza Cricket League

- Dates: 19 – 31 July 2025
- Administrator: Afghanistan Cricket Board (ACB)
- Cricket format: Twenty20
- Tournament format(s): Double round-robin and final
- Host: Afghanistan
- Champions: Amo Sharks (2nd title)
- Runners-up: Mis Ainak Knights
- Participants: 5
- Matches: 21
- Player of the series: Karim Janat (Boost Defenders)
- Most runs: Hashmatullah Shahidi (Band-e-Amir Dragons) (321)
- Most wickets: Sharafuddin Ashraf (Amo Sharks) (14)

The 2025 Shpageeza Cricket League (also known as for sponsorship reasons as 2025 Etisalat Shpageeza Cricket League) was the 10th edition of the Shpageeza Cricket League, a professional Twenty20 cricket (T20) league established by the Afghanistan Cricket Board (ACB) in 2013, and the sixth edition to have official T20 status. On 12 July 2025, Afghanistan Cricket Board announced the complete fixtures of 2025 editions.

The Amo Sharks are the defending champions.

Amo Sharks defend their title for the second time defeating Mis Ainak Knights in the final.

== Squads ==
Squads were announced on 9 July 2025.

Amo Sharks	Band-e-Amir Dragons	Boost Defenders	Mis Ainak Knights	Speenghar Tigers
Azmatullah Omarzai (c); Aftab Alam; Sharafuddin Ashraf; Qais Ahmad; Sharifullah Ahmadzai; Yamin Ahmadzai; Hassan Eisakhil; Fazalhaq Farooqi; Mohammad Ishaq (wk); Babar Khan; Abdul Malik; Imran Mir; Ijaz Mihri; Mohammadullah; Noor Rahman; Samiullah Shinwari; Shahidullah	Hashmatullah Shahidi (c); Khalil Ahmed; Sediqullah Atal; Abdul Hadi; Haroon Khan; Nangialai Kharoti; Nijat Masood; Asif Musazai; Gulbadin Naib; Izharulhaq Naveed; Darwish Rasooli; Mohammad Saleem; Lalbaz Sinzai; Qamar Shams; Mohammad Shahzad (wk)	Ibrahim Zadran (c); Bashir Ahmad; Bilal Ahmad; Noor Ahmad; Mohammad Akram; Yama Arab; Mobin Bakhtyar; Arab Gul; Karim Janat; Haji Murad Muradi (wk); Allah Noor; Naveed Obaid; Abdul Rahman; Tariq Stanikzai; Abdullah Tarakhail; Azim Zadran; Najibullah Zadran; Shawkat Zaman	Rahmanullah Gurbaz (c); Emal; Farmanullah; Khalil Gurbaz; Mohibullah Hamraz; Riaz Hassan; Nasir Jamal; Mohammad Nabi; Mujeeb Ur Rahman; Zia-ur-Rehman; Bilal Sami; Zia Sharifi; Sayed Shirzad; Khalid Taniwal; Wafiullah Tarakhil; Afsar Zazai (wk); Sohail Khan Zurmati; Naveed Zadran	Rashid Khan (c) (Note: Rahmat Shah captained Speenghar Tigers in their first four matches of the group stage.); Fareed Ahmad; Ijaz Ahmad Ahmadzai; Ikram Alikhil (wk); Zubaid Akbari; Ismat Alam; Faridoon Dawoodzai; Naseer Khan; Zahir Khan; Shams Karokhil; Lutfullah; Ibrahim Sharifi; Baheer Shah; Rahmat Shah; Yousuf Shah; Dawlat Zadran; Rahmanullah Zadran; Hazratullah Zazai

== Standings ==
=== Points table ===
Pos	Team	Pld	W	L	NR	Pts	NRR	Qualification
1	Amo Sharks	8	6	2	0	12	0.872	Advanced to final
2	Mis Ainak Knights	8	5	3	0	10	0.314	Advanced to final
3	Boost Defenders	8	4	4	0	8	−0.004	
4	Band-e-Amir Dragons	8	3	5	0	6	−0.811	
5	Speenghar Tigers	8	2	6	0	4	−0.407	

Source: ESPNcricinfo

=== League progression ===
Team	Group matches							
Team	1	2	3	4	5	6	7	8
Amo Sharks	2	4	4	6	6	8	10	12
Band-e-Amir Dragons	2	2	4	4	4	6	6	6
Boost Defenders	0	2	2	4	6	6	6	8
Mis Ainak Knights	2	2	4	6	8	8	8	10
Speenghar Tigers	0	0	0	0	2	2	4	4

Win	Loss	Tie	No result	Eliminated

- Note: The total points at the end of each group match are listed.
- Note: Click on the points or results to see the match summary.

== League stage ==
Match 1
19 July 2025
09:00
Scorecard

Boost Defenders; 148/5 (20 overs)	v	Amo Sharks; 151/4 (18.5 overs)
Mohammad Akram 64* (52); Fazalhaq Farooqi 2/25 (4 overs)		Imran Mir 85* (58); Noor Ahmad 1/12 (4 overs)

Amo Sharks won by 6 wickets
Kabul International Cricket Stadium, Kabul
Umpires: Farooq Khan and Izatullah Safi
Player of the match: Imran Mir (Amo Sharks)

- Amo Sharks won the toss and elected to field.

Match 2
19 July 2025
14:00
Scorecard

Speenghar Tigers; 151/8 (20 overs)	v	Mis Ainak Knights; 152/6 (19.5 overs)
Ijaz Ahmad Ahmadzai 75 (45); Mujeeb Ur Rahman 3/14 (4 overs)		Wafiullah Tarakhil 45 (26); Zahir Khan 3/33 (3.5 overs)

Mis Ainak Knights won by 4 wickets
Kabul International Cricket Stadium, Kabul
Umpires: Mahmood Kharoti and Ajmal Shamolzi
Player of the match: Mujeeb Ur Rahman (Mis Ainak Knights)

Match 3
20 July 2025
09:00
Scorecard

Mis Ainak Knights; 187/5 (20 overs)	v	Band-e-Amir Dragons; 188/4 (19.2 overs)
Sohail Khan Zurmati 59* (41); Khalil Ahmed 4/33 (4 overs)		Rahmanullah 64 (39); Farmanullah 2/20 (4 overs)

Band-e-Amir Dragons won by 6 wickets
Kabul International Cricket Stadium, Kabul
Umpires: Ahmed Shah Durrani and Ajmal Shamolzi
Player of the match: Khalil Ahmed (Band-e-Amir Dragons)

- Band-e-Amir Dragons won the toss and elected to field.

Match 4
20 July 2025
14:00
Scorecard

Boost Defenders; 202/6 (20 overs)	v	Speenghar Tigers; 137 (19.2 overs)
Allah Noor 56 (26); Zahir Khan 2/34 (4 overs)		Rahmat Shah 27 (17); Arab Gul 4/14 (3.2 overs)

Boost Defenders won by 65 runs
Kabul International Cricket Stadium, Kabul
Umpires: Farooq Khan and Mahmood Kharoti

- Boost Defenders won the toss and elected to bat.

Match 5
21 July 2025
09:00
Scorecard

Band-e-Amir Dragons; 199/4 (20 overs)	v	Amo Sharks; 203/7 (20 overs)
Hashmatullah Shahidi 73 (51); Yamin Ahmadazi 2/44 (4 overs)		Shahidullah 44* (33); Izharullaq Naveed 2/27 (3 overs)

Amo Sharks won by 3 wickets
Kabul International Cricket Stadium, Kabul
Umpires: Ahmed Shah Durrani and Muhammad Sabir
Player of the match: Shahidullah (Amo Sharks)

- Band-e-Amir Dragons won the toss and elected to bat.

Match 6
21 July 2025
14:00
Scorecard

Mis Ainak Knights; 177/5 (20 overs)	v	Boost Defenders; 159/7 (20 overs)
Wafiullah Tarakhil 59 (43); Abdul Rahman Rahmani 3/35 (4 overs)		Mohammad Akram 56 (46); Mujeeb Ur Rahman 2/14 (4 overs)

Mis Ainak Knights won by 18 runs
Kabul International Cricket Stadium, Kabul
Umpires: Mahmood Kharoti and Izatullah Safi
Player of the match: Wafiullah Tarakhil (Mis Ainak Knights)

- Mis Ainak Knights won the toss and elected to bat.

Match 7
22 July 2025
09:00
Scorecard

Band-e-Amir Dragons; 192/5 (20 overs)	v	Speenghar Tigers; 180/9 (20 overs)
Sediqullah Atal 75 (47); Shams Ur Rahman 3/42 (4 overs)		Ikram Alikhil 51 (33); Izharulhaq Naveed 3/28 (4 overs)

Band-e-Amir Dragons won by 12 runs
Kabul International Cricket Stadium, Kabul
Umpires: Mahmood Kharoti and Muhammad Sabir
Player of the match: Sediqullah Atal (Band-e-Amir Dragons)

- Speenghar Tigers won the toss and elected to field.

Match 8
22 July 2025
14:00
Scorecard

Amo Sharks; 162 (19.4 overs)	v	Mis Ainak Knights; 165/5 (17 overs)
Hassan Eisakhil 52 (36); Naveed Zadran 4/21 (4 overs)		Khalid Taniwal 56 (27); Qais Ahmad 2/43 (4 overs)

Mis Ainak Kinghts won by 5 wickets
Kabul International Cricket Stadium, Kabul
Umpires: Farooq Khan and Izatullah Safi
Player of the match: Naveed Zadran (Mis Ainak Kinghts)

- Amo Sharks won the toss and elected to bat.

Match 9
24 July 2025
09:00
Scorecard

Speen Ghar Tigers; 121 (18.1 overs)	v	Amo Sharks; 124/7 (18.3 overs)
Zubaid Akbari 43 (27); Sharafuddin Ashraf 3/26 (4 overs)		Shahidullah 57* (50); Mohammad Ibrahim 2/31 (4 overs)

Amo Sharks won by 3 wickets
Kabul International Cricket Stadium, Kabul
Umpires: Ahmed Shah Durrani and Muhammad Sabir
Player of the match: Shahidullah (Amo Sharks)

- Amo Sharks won the toss and elected to field.

Match 10
24 July 2025
14:00
Scorecard

Boost Defenders; 212/5 (20 overs)	v	Band-e-Amir Dragons; 203/8 (20 overs)
Mohammad Akram 86 (57); Mohammad Saleem 2/28 (4 overs)		Gulbadin Naib 57 (26); Noor Ahmad 5/28 (4 overs)

Boost Defenders won by 9 runs
Kabul International Cricket Stadium, Kabul
Umpires: Ajmal Shamolzi and Farooq Khan
Player of the match: Noor Ahmad (Boost Defenders)

- Boost Defenders won the toss and elected to bat.

Match 11
25 July 2025
09:00
Scorecard

Amo Sharks; 165/7 (20 overs)	v	Mis Ainak Knights; 166/3 (19 overs)
Imran Mir 47 (37); Khalil Gurbaz 2/30 (4 overs)		Khalid Taniwal 102* (52); Sharafuddin Ashraf 3/15 (4 overs)

Mis Ainak Knights won by 7 wickets
Kabul International Cricket Stadium, Kabul
Umpires: Ahmed Shah Durrani and Ajmal Shamolzi
Player of the match: Khalid Taniwal (Mis Ainak Knights)

- Mis Ainak Knights won the toss and elected to field.
- Khalid Taniwal (Mis Ainak Knights) scored his first century in T20s.

Match 12
25 July 2025
14:00
Scorecard

Band-e-Amir Dragons; 177/7 (20 overs)	v	Speenghar Tigers; 178/6 (20 overs)
Sediqullah Atal 55 (38); Ismat Alam 2/20 (2 overs)		Darwish Rasooli 63 (44); Allah Mohammad Ghazanfar 2/10 (4 overs)

Speenghar Tigers won by 4 wickets
Kabul International Cricket Stadium, Kabul
Umpires: Ahmad Shah Pakteen and Izatullah Safi
Player of the match: Darwish Rasooli (Speenghar Tigers)

- Band-e-Amir Dragons won the toss and elected to bat.

Match 13
26 July 2025
09:00
Scorecard

Mis Ainak Knights; 154/9 (20 overs)	v	Boost Defenders; 155/4 (16.5 overs)
Afsar Zazai 34 (26); Arab Gul 3/22 (4 overs)		Ibrahim Zadran 65 (44); Farmanullah 2/22 (3 overs)

Boost Defenders won by 7 wickets
Kabul International Cricket Stadium, Kabul
Umpires: Farooq Khan and Muhammad Sabir
Player of the match: Ibrahim Zadran (Boost Defenders)

- Boost Defenders won the toss and elected to field.

Match 14
26 July 2025
14:00
Scorecard

Speenghar Tigers; 173/6 (20 overs)	v	Amo Sharks; 174/4 (18.4 overs)
Rahmat Shah 52 (33); Azmatullah Omarzai 3/31 (4 overs)		Hassan Eisakhil 54 (38); Zubaid Akbari 2/28 (4 overs)

Amo Sharks won by 6 wickets
Kabul International Cricket Stadium, Kabul
Umpires: Mahmood Kharoti and Ahmad Shah Pakteen
Player of the match: Azmatullah Omarzai (Amo Sharks)

- Speenghar Tigers won the toss and elected to bat.

Match 15
28 July 2025
09:00
Scorecard

Boost Defenders; 182/6 (20 overs)	v	Band-e-Amir Dragons; 183/7 (19.5 overs)
Karim Janat 65 (41); Gulbadin Naib 4/41 (4 overs)		Sediqullah Atal 34 (22); Bashir Ahmad 2/39 (4 overs)

Band-e-Amir Dragons won by 3 wickets
Kabul International Cricket Stadium, Kabul
Umpires: Ahmad Shah Pakteen and Izatullah Safi
Player of the match: Gulbadin Naib (Band-e-Amir Dragons)

- Band-e-Amir Dragons won the toss and elected to field.

Match 16
28 July 2025
14:00
Scorecard

Speenghar Tigers; 191/6 (20 overs)	v	Mis Ainak Knights; 141/9 (20 overs)
Hazratullah Zazai 50 (25); Farmanullah 2/30 (4 overs)		Farmanullah 37* (32); Zubaid Akbari 4/14 (2.3 overs)

Speenghar Tigers won by 50 runs
Kabul International Cricket Stadium, Kabul
Umpires: Farooq Khan and Mahmood Kharoti
Player of the match: Zubaid Akbari (Speenghar Tigers)

- Mis Ainak Knights won the toss and elected to field.

Match 17
29 July 2025
09:00
Scorecard

Amo Sharks; 128 (19.4 overs)	v	Boost Defenders; 51 (11 overs)
Samiullah Shinwari 49 (34); Wahidullah Zadran 4/22 (4 overs)		Karim Janat 14 (6); Abdullah 4/7 (3 overs)

Amo Sharks won by 77 runs
Kabul International Cricket Stadium, Kabul
Umpires: Izatullah Safi and Ajmal Shamolzi
Player of the match: Samiullah Shinwari (Amo Sharks)

- Boost Defenders won the toss and elected to field.

Match 18
29 July 2025
14:00
Scorecard

Mis Ainak Knights; 264/2 (20 overs)	v	Band-e-Amir Dragons; 192/9 (17.3 overs)
Wafiullah Tarakhil 78* (35); Gulbadin Naib 1/27 (3.3 overs)		Haroon Khan 40 (16); Bilal Sami 2/29 (3 overs)

Mis Ainak Knights won by 72 runs
Kabul International Cricket Stadium, Kabul
Umpires: Ahmed Shah Durrani and Ahmad Shah Pakteen
Player of the match: Farmanullah (Mis Ainak Kninghts)

- Band-e-Amir Dragons won the toss and elected to field.

Match 19
30 July 2025
09:00
Scorecard

Band-e-Amir Dragons; 180/5 (20 overs)	v	Amo Sharks; 182/1 (13.5 overs)
Sediqullah Atal 75 (52); Sharafuddin Ashraf 2/41 (4 overs)		Noor ul Rahman 115* (43); Lalbaz Sinzai 1/29 (2 overs)

Amo Sharks won by 9 wickets
Kabul International Cricket Stadium, Kabul
Umpires: Ahmad Shah Pakteen and Ajmal Shamolzi
Player of the match: Noor ul Rahman (Amo Sharks)

- Band-e-Amir Dragons won the toss and elected to bat.

Match 20
30 July 2025
14:00
Scorecard

Boost Defenders; 206 (20 overs)	v	Speenghar Tigers; 198/9 (20 overs)
Karim Janat 50 (24); Rashid Khan 4/19 (4 overs)		Hazratullah Zazai 50 (19); Karim Janat 3/34 (4 overs)

Boost Defenders won by 2 runs
Kabul International Cricket Stadium, Kabul
Umpires: Ahmed Shah Durrani and Mahmood Kharoti
Player of the match: Karim Janat (Boost Defenders)

- Boost Defenders won the toss and elected to bat.

== Final ==
Final
31 July 2025
09:00
Scorecard

Mis Ainak Knights; 121 (16.2 overs)	v	Amo Sharks; 124/2 (12.4 overs)
Rahmanullah Gurbaz 48 (21); Azmatullah Omarzai 4/21 (3.2 overs)		Hassan Eisakhil 50* (34); Khalil Gurbaz 1/12 (2 overs)

Amo Sharks won by 8 wickets
Kabul International Cricket Stadium, Kabul
Umpires: Ahmed Shah Durrani and Izatullah Safi
Player of the match: Abdullah (Amo Sharks)

- Amo Sharks won the toss and elected to field.

== End of season awards ==
- Most Valuable Player: Karim Janat (Boost Defenders)
- Best Batter: Hashmatullah Shahidi (Band-e-Amir Dragons)
- Best Bowler: Sharafuddin Ashraf (Amo Sharks)
- Emerging Player: Khalid Taniwal (Mis Ainak Knights)
