= 2025 Ahmad Shah Abdali 4-day Tournament =

8th edition of Ahmad Shah Abdali 4-day Tournament

- Dates: 5 May – 22 June 2025
- Administrator: Afghanistan Cricket Board (ACB)
- Cricket format: First-class
- Tournament format(s): Double round-robin and final
- Host: Afghanistan
- Champions: Maiwand Champions (2nd title)
- Participants: 4
- Matches: 13
- Player of the series: Sharafuddin Ashraf (Mah-e-Par Stars)
- Most runs: Shahidullah (Mah-e-Par Stars) (541)
- Most wickets: Sharafuddin Ashraf (Mah-e-Par Stars) (36)

The 2025 Ahmad Shah Abdali 4-day Tournament was the eighth edition of the Ahmad Shah Abdali 4-day Tournament, a first-class cricket tournament in Afghanistan. The tournament was started on 5 May and the final was played from 18-22 June 2025. The Afghanistan Cricket Board (ACB) confirmed the fixtures of the tournament on 30 April 2025.

Maiwand Champions won their second title beating Mah-e-Par Stars in the final by 9 wickets.

== Points table ==
Pos	Team	Pld	W	D	L	Pts	Qualification
1	Mah-e-Par Stars	6	3	2	1	89	Advanced to the final
2	Maiwand Champions	6	1	3	2	75	Advanced to the final
3	Pamir Legends	6	1	4	1	67	
4	Hindukush Strikers	6	1	3	2	45	

Source: ESPNcricinfo

== Round-robin ==
=== Round 1 ===
5–8 May 2025
Scorecard

Hindukush Strikers	v	Mah-e-Par Stars
405 (112.5 overs); Hashmatullah Shahidi 205 (280); Khalil Gurbaz 3/107 (19.5 overs)		407/9d (137 overs); Shahidullah 174 (366); Ziaur Rahman 3/46 (17 overs)
283/7d (86 overs); Hashmatullah Shahidi 104 (161); Khalil Gurbaz 3/74 (20 overs)

Match drawn
Ghazi Amanullah International Cricket Stadium, Nangarhar
Umpires: Ihsanullah Danish and Ahmad Shah Pakteen
Player of the match: Hashmatullah Shahidi (Hindukush Strikers)

- Hindukush Strikers won the toss and elected to bat.
- Points: Mah-e-Par Stars 15, Hindukush Strikers 9

5–8 May 2025
Scorecard

Pamir Legends	v	Maiwand Champions
329 (79.5 overs); Nasir Jamal 82 (119); Zahir Khan 4/62 (16.5 overs)		300 (89.5 overs); Bahir Shah 127 (193); Mohammad Saleem 3/54 (21 overs)
367/8d (87.3 overs); Yousuf Shah 137 (179); Khalil Ahmed 3/65 (19 overs)		227/6 (55.4 overs); Shawkat Zaman 119 (170); Mohammad Saleem 2/16 (10.4 overs)

Match drawn
Najibullah Tarakai Cricket Ground, Nangarhar
Umpires: Ahmed Shah Durrani and Mahmood Kharoti
Player of the match: Yousuf Shah (Pamir Legends)

- Maiwand Champions won the toss and elected to field.
- Points: Pamir Legends 14, Maiwand Champions 9

=== Round 2 ===
11–14 May 2025
Scorecard

Maiwand Champions	v	Mah-e-Par Stars
297 (78.2 overs); Haroon Khan 129* (208); Sharafuddin Ashraf 3/37 (17 overs)		198 (66.5 overs); Shahidullah 60 (109); Zahir Khan 3/46 (13 overs)
136 (48 overs); Haroon Khan 35 (101); Khalil Gurbaz 5/50 (11 overs)		236/5 (60.3 overs); Darwish Rasooli 122 (139); Zahir Khan 2/69 (15 overs)

Mah-e-Par Stars won by 5 wickets
Ghazi Amanullah International Cricket Stadium, Nangarhar
Umpires: Nasir Khan and Izatullah Safi
Player of the match: Darwish Rasooli (Mah-e-Par Stars)

- Mah-e-Par Stars won the toss and elected to field.
- Kamal Khan (Maiwand Champions) made his first-class debut.
- Haroon Khan (Maiwand Champions) scored his maiden century in first-class cricket.
- Points: Mah-e-Par Stars 15, Maiwand Champions 0

11–14 May 2025
Scorecard

Pamir Legends	v	Hindukush Strikers
548 (118.5 overs); Rahmanullah 170* (214); Izharulhaq Naveed 4/146 (27.5 overs)		134 (47.2 overs); Mohammad Asif 26 (59); Nangeyalia Kharote 6/25 (13.2 overs)
		205 (42.3 overs) (f/o); Sediqullah Atal 62 (62); Qais Ahmad 4/13 (7 overs)

Pamir Legends won by an innings and 209 runs
Najibullah Tarakai Cricket Ground, Nangarhar
Umpires: Ihsanullah Danish and Bismillah Jan Shinwari
Player of the match: Qais Ahmad (Pamir Legends)

- Hindukush Strikers won the toss and elected to field.
- Qais Ahmad (Pamir Legends) scored his maiden century in first-class cricket.
- Points: Pamir Legends 25, Hindukush Strikers 0

=== Round 3 ===
17–20 May 2025
Scorecard

Hindukush Strikers	v	Maiwand Champions
197 (73.3 overs); Bilal Ahmad 41 (63); Zia-ur-Rehman 5/30 (19.3 overs)		227 (81.3 overs); Shawkat Zaman; Ziaur Rahman 5/33 (22.3 overs)
444/6d Hassan Eisakhil 105 (138); Ziaur Rahman 5/66 (28.5 overs)		175/7 (115.5 overs); Ijaz Ahmad 67 (157); Mohammadullah 2/27 (17 overs)

Match drawn
Ghazi Amanullah International Cricket Stadium, Nangarhar
Umpires: Farooq Khan and Muhammad Sabir
Player of the match: Ziaur Rahman (Hindukush Strikers)

- Hindukush Strikers won the toss and elected to bat.
- Hassan Eisakhil and Aqil Khan (Hindukush Strikers) both made their first-class debuts.
- Hassan Eisakhil (Hindukush Strikers) scored his maiden century in first-class cricket.
- Points: Maiwand Champions 14, Hindukush Strikers 7

17–20 May 2025
Scorecard

Mah-e-Par Stars	v	Pamir Legends
336 (80.3 overs); Darwish Rasooli 134 (184); Qais Ahmad 4/62 (19 overs)		221 (64.2 overs); Rahmanullah 74 (117); Sharafuddin Ashraf 4/44 (16.2 overs)
402/8d Darwish Rasooli 116 (122); Nangeyalia Kharote 5/77 (26 overs)		276 (57.3 overs); Nasir Jamal 95 (123); Sharafuddin Ashraf 5/95 (20.3 overs)

Mah-e-Par Stars won by 242
Najibullah Tarakai Cricket Ground, Nangarhar
Umpires: Ahmed Shah Durrani and Ahmad Shah Pakteen
Player of the match: (Mah-e-Par Stars)

- Mah-e-Par Stars won the toss and elected to bat.
- Points: Mah-e-Par Stars 22, Pamir Legends 0

=== Round 4 ===
23–26 May 2025
Scorecard

Pamir Legends	v	Maiwand Champions
122 (5.2 overs); Rahmat Shah 22 (70); Zia-ur-Rehman 4/30 (14.2 overs)		78/2 (22 overs); Masood Gurbaz 101 (156); Abuzar Safi 5/59 (15 overs)
446 (109 overs); Abdul Malik 101 (156); Zia-ur-Rehman 4/100 (27 overs)		206/2 (57 overs); Mohammad Ishaq 72* (133); Nangeyalia Kharote 1/11 (13 overs)

Match drawn
Ghazi Amanullah International Cricket Stadium, Nangarhar
Umpires: Ajmal Shamolzi and Bismillah Jan Shinwari
Player of the match: Masood Gurbaz (Maiwand Champions)

- Pamir Legends won the toss and elected to bat.
- Abuzar Safi (Pamir Legends) made his first-class debut.
- Masood Gurbaz (Maiwand Champions) scored his maiden century in first-class cricket.
- Abuzar Safi (Pamir Legends) took his maiden five-wicket haul in first-class cricket.
- Points: Maiwand Champions 15, Pamir Legends 8

23–26 May 2025
Scorecard

Hindukush Strikers	v	Mah-e-Par Stars
243 (97.2 overs); Mohammad Asif 59 (151); Naseer Khan Maroofkhil 5/45 (23.2 overs)		439 (111.1 overs); Zubaid Akbari 96 (162); Aqil Khan 2/57 (21 overs)
221 (70.4 overs); Ismat Alam 53* (122); Sharafuddin Ashraf 6/60 (25 overs)		17/1 (3.1 overs); Afsar Zazai 11* (10); Hashmatullah Shahidi 1/8 (1.1 overs)

Mah-e-Par Stars won by 9 wickets
Najibullah Tarakai Cricket Ground, Nangarhar
Umpires: Mahmood Kharoti and Izatullah Safi
Player of the match: Sharafuddin Ashraf (Mah-e-Par Stars)

- Hindukush Strikers won the toss and elected to bat.
- Points: Mah-e-Par Stars 22, Hindukush Strikers 0

=== Round 5 ===
29 May–1 June 2025
Scorecard

Hindukush Strikers	v	Pamir Legends
811/9d (184 overs); Mohammad Asif 245 (319); Farmanullah 4/102 (22 overs)		365/6 (102.3 overs); Rahmat Shah 157 (258); Amanullah 3/44 (12.3 overs)

Match drawn
Najibullah Tarakai Cricket Ground, Nangarhar
Umpires: Ahmed Shah Durrani and Muhammad Sabir

- Hindukush Strikers won the toss and elected to bat.
- Noor ul Rahman (Hindukush Strikers) scored his maiden century in first-class cricket.
- Points: Hindukush Strikers 13, Pamir Legends 12

29 May–1 June 2025
Scorecard

Maiwand Champions	v	Mah-e-Par Stars
268 (65 overs); Kamal Khan 138 (229); Mohammad Ibrahim 3/66 (17 overs)		232 (87.2 overs); Sharafuddin Ashraf 67 (119); Zia-ur-Rehman 3/20 (18.2 overs)
211 (69 overs); Kamal Khan 80 (189); Nasim Mangal 4/49 (11 overs)		219 (76.4 overs); Allah Noor 81 (151); Yamin Ahmadzai 3/41 (17 overs)

Maiwand Champions won by 28 runs
Ghazi Amanullah International Cricket Stadium, Nangarhar
Umpires: Farooq Khan and Ahmed Shah Pakteen

- Maiwand Champions won the toss and elected to bat.
- Kamal Khan (Maiwand Champions) scored his maiden century in first-class cricket.
- Points: Maiwand Champions 21, Mah-e-Par Stars 0

=== Round 6 ===
12–15 June 2025
Scorecard

Hindukush Strikers	v	Maiwand Champions
127 (42 overs); Noor ul Rahman 34* (86); Bashir Ahmad 6/49 (16 overs)		236 (50.2 overs); Mohammad Ishaq 40 (72); Mohibullah Zurmati 3/62 (12 overs)
442/7d (123.4 overs); Shams Ur Rahman 171* (242); Yamin Ahmadzai 5/98 (32 overs)		96 (30 overs); Bahir Shah 24 (52); Mohibullah Zurmati 4/14 (5 overs)

Hindukush Strikers won by 237 runs
Ghazi Amanullah International Cricket Stadium, Nangarhar
Umpires: Izatullah Safi and Bismillah Jan Shinwari
Player of the match: Shams Ur Rahman (Hindukush Strikers)

- Hindukush Strikers won the toss and elected to bat.
- Shams Ur Rahman (Hindukush Strikers) scored his maiden century in first-class cricket.
- Points: Hindukush Strikers 16, Maiwand Champions 8

12–15 June 2025
Scorecard

Mah-e-Par Stars	v	Pamir Legends
434 (131.2 overs); Afsar Zazai 202 (332); Qais Ahmad 4/122 (31.2 overs)		308 (83 overs); Abdul Malik 134 (194); Sharafuddin Ashraf 5/55 (22 overs)
89 (42.4 overs); Riaz Hassan 39 (91); Qais Ahmad 4/21 (15 overs)		147/4 (32.2 overs); Rahmat Shah 50* (48); Naseer Khan Maroofkhil 2/30 (9.2 overs)

Match drawn
Najibullah Tarakai Cricket Ground, Nangarhar
Umpires: Mahmood Kharoti and Ajmal Shamolzi
Player of the match: Afsar Zazai (Mah-e-Par Stars)

- Mah-e-Par Stars won the toss and elected to bat.
- Points: Mah-e-Par Stars 15, Pamir Legends 8

== Final ==
18–22 June 2025
Scorecard

Mah-e-Par Stars	v	Maiwand Champions
135 (43.2 overs); Afsar Zazai 44 (92); Bashir Ahmad 5/37 (15.2 overs)		221 (52.2 overs); Bahir Shah 90 (112); Nasim Mangal 4/48 (16.2 overs)
97 (25.5 overs); Riaz Hassan 38 (61); Yamin Ahmadzai 4/16 (9 overs)		14/1 (0.5 over); Mohammad Ishaq 10* (2); Darwish Rasooli 1/14 (0.5 over)

Maiwand Champions won by 9 wickets
Ghazi Amanullah International Cricket Stadium, Nangarhar
Umpires: Ahmed Shah Durrani and Ahmad Shah Pakteen
Player of the match: Yamin Ahmadzai (Maiwand Champions)

- Maiwand Champions won the toss and elected to field.
