= 2025 Wakhan National T20 Cup =

Cricket tournament in Afghanistan

- Dates: 28 June – 7 July 2025
- Administrator: Afghanistan Cricket Board
- Cricket format: Twenty20
- Tournament format(s): Double round-robin and final
- Host: Afghanistan
- Champions: Hindukush Strikers (1st title)
- Runners-up: Pamir Legends
- Participants: 4
- Matches: 13
- Player of the series: Farmanullah (Mah-e-Par Stars)
- Most runs: Zubaid Akbari (Hindukush Strikers) (167)
- Most wickets: Yama Arab (Hindukush Strikers) (11); Bilal Sami (Pamir Legends) (11)

The 2025 Wakhan National T20 Cup, also known as X-Bull Wakhan National T20 Cup for sponsorship reasons, was the second season of the National T20 Cup, a Twenty20 cricket competition played in Afghanistan. The tournament took place from 28 June to 7 July 2025. Four regional teams competing in a double round-robin league, with the matches being held at Kunduz Cricket Ground in Kunduz.

== Teams ==
The following teams will participate in the tournament:

- Hindukush Strikers
- Mah-e-Par Stars
- Maiwand Champions
- Pamir Legends

== Standings ==
=== Points table ===
Pos	Team	Pld	W	L	NR	Pts	NRR	Qualification
1	Hindukush Strikers	6	6	0	0	12	1.771	Advanced to final
2	Pamir Legends	6	3	3	0	6	−0.695	Advanced to final
3	Mah-e-Par Stars	6	2	4	0	4	−0.659	
4	Maiwand Champions	6	1	5	0	2	−0.432	

Source: ESPNcricinfo Fancode

=== Match summary ===
Team	Group matches					
Team	1	2	3	4	5	6
Hindukush Strikers	2	4	6	8	10	12
Mah-e-Par Stars	0	2	4	4	4	4
Maiwand Champions	0	0	0	0	0	2
Pamir Legends	2	2	2	4	6	6

Win	Loss	Tie	No result	Eliminated

- Note: The total points at the end of each group match are listed.
- Note: Click on the points or results to see the match summary.

== League stage ==
Match 1
28 June 2025
09:00
Scorecard

Pamir Legends; 161/8 (20 overs)	v	Maiwand Champions; 136 (18.4 overs)
Emal Shaheen 36 (29); Ismat Alam 3/23 (4 overs)		Imran Mir 64 (43); Arab Gul 4/16 (4 overs)

Pamir Legends won by 25 runs
Kunduz Cricket Ground, Kunduz
Umpires: Ahmed Shah Durrani and Ajmal Shamolzi
Player of the match: Arab Gul (Pamir Legends)

- Maiwand Champions won the toss and elected to field.
- Mohibullah Hamraz, Asif Shah Khan and Noor ul Rahman (Pamir Legends) all made their T20 debuts.

Match 2
28 June 2025
13:30
Scorecard

Mah-e-Par Stars; 79 (16.4 overs)	v	Hindukush Strikers; 80/4 (13.4 overs)
Farmanullah 39 (30); Dawlat Zadran 3/5 (2.4 overs)		Dawlat Zadran 42* (45); Mohammad Saleem 3/11 (3 overs)

Hindukush Strikers won by 6 wickets
Kunduz Cricket Ground, Kunduz
Umpires: Ihsanullah Danish and Farooq Khan
Player of the match: Faridoon Dawoodzai (Hindukush Strikers)

- Mah-e-Par Stars won the toss and elected to bat.
- Kamal Khan, Abdullah Tarakhil (Hindukush Strikers) and Qamar Shams (Mah-e-Par Stars) all made their T20 debuts.

Match 3
29 June 2025
09:00
Scorecard

Pamir Legends; 174/8 (20 overs)	v	Mah-e-Par Stars; 175/6 (19.4 overs)
Haroon Khan 92 (56); Mohammad Saleem 3/22 (4 overs)		Mohammad Shahzad 94 (48); Bilal Sami 3/18 (3.4 overs)

Mah-e-Par Stars won by 4 wickets
Kunduz Cricket Ground, Kunduz
Umpires: Muhammad Sabir and Izatullah Safi
Player of the match: Mohammad Shahzad (Mah-e-Par Stars)

- Mah-e-Par Stars won the toss and elected to field.
- Osman Sadat (Mah-e-Par Stars) and Barakzai Nasari (Pamir Legends) both made their T20 debuts.

Match 4
29 June 2025
13:30
Scorecard

Maiwand Champions; 146/9 (20 overs)	v	Hindukush Strikers; 150/5 (20 overs)
Samiullah Shinwari 29 (34); Dawlat Zadran 3/33 (4 overs)		Mohammad Ishaq 65 (42); Khalil Ahmed 2/34 (4 overs)

Hindukush Strikers won by 5 wickets
Kunduz Cricket Ground, Kunduz
Umpires: Nasir Khan and Mahmood Kharoti
Player of the match: Mohammad Ishaq (Hindukush Strikers)

- Maiwand Champions won the toss and elected to bat.
- Dawlat Zadran (Hindukush Strikers) took his 100th wicket in T20s.

Match 5
1 July 2025
09:00
Scorecard

Mah-e-Par Stars; 171/5 (20 overs)	v	Maiwand Champions; 166/7 (20 overs)
Hazratullah Zazai 57 (42); Babar Khan 2/28 (4 overs)		Najibullah Zadran 42 (26); Mohammad Ibrahim 3/23 (4 overs)

Mah-e-Par Stars won by 5 runs
Kunduz Cricket Ground, Kunduz
Umpires: Farooq Khan and Ajmal Shamolzi
Player of the match: Mohammad Ibrahim (Mah-e-Par Stars)

- Mah-e-Par Stars won the toss and elected to bat.
- Shir Khan (Mah-e-Par Stars) and Khalid Taniwal (Maiwand Champions) both made their T20 debut.

Match 6
1 July 2025
13:30
Scorecard

Hindukush Strikers; 176/8 (20 overs)	v	Pamir Legends; 82 (15 overs)
Mobin Bakhtyar 58 (44); Bilal Sami 2/29 (4 overs)		Wafiullah Tarakhil 30 (25); Yama Arab 4/21 (3 overs)

Hindukush Strikers won by 94 runs
Kunduz Cricket Ground, Kunduz
Umpires: Ahmed Shah Durrani and Farooq Khan

- Hindukush Strikers won the toss and elected to bat.
- Mobin Bakhtyar and Azim Zadran (Hindukush Strikers) both made their T20 debuts.

Match 7
2 July 2025
09:00
Scorecard

Maiwand Champions; 163/8 (20 overs)	v	Pamir Legends; 167/7 (19.5 overs)
Abdul Hadi 50 (46); Mohibullah Hamraz 2/24 (4 overs)		Wafiullah Tarakhil 76 (39); Samiullah Shinwari 3/22 (4 overs)

Pamir Legends won by 3 wickets
Kunduz Cricket Ground, Kunduz
Umpires: Mahmood Kharoti and Muhammad Sabir
Player of the match: Wafiullah Tarakhil (Pamir Legends)

- Maiwand Champions won the toss and elected to bat.
- Mohammad Dawood (Maiwand Champions) made his T20 debut.

Match 8
2 July 2025
13:30
Scorecard

Mah-e-Par Stars; 144 (20 overs)	v	Hindukush Strikers; 145/6 (20 overs)
Farmanullah 28 (19); Yama Arab 2/14 (3 overs)		Zubaid Akbari 47 (43); Khalil Gurbaz 2/28 (4 overs)

Hindukush Strikers won by 4 wickets
Kunduz Cricket Ground, Kunduz
Umpires: Mahmood Kharoti and Izatullah Safi
Player of the match: Zubaid Akbari (Hindukush Strikers)

- Mah-e-Par Stars won the toss and elected to bat.
- Lutfullah Mahammadi and Sohail Khan Zurmati (Hindukush Strikers) both made their T20 debut.

Match 9
4 July 2025
09:00
Scorecard

Pamir Legends; 154/8 (20 overs)	v	Mah-e-Par Stars; 128 (19.2 overs)
Noor ul Rahman 28 (24); Khalil Gurbaz 3/24 (4 overs)		Naveed Obaid 40 (37); Mohammadullah 3/24 (4 overs)

Pamir Legends won by 26 runs
Kunduz Cricket Ground, Kunduz
Umpires: Ahmed Shah Durrani and Ajmal Shamolzi
Player of the match: Lalbaz Sinzai (Pamir Legends)

- Pamir Legends won the toss and elected to bat.

Match 10
4 July 2025
13:30
Scorecard

Maiwand Champions; 145/8 (20 overs)	v	Hindukush Strikers; 151/5 (17.5 overs)
Samiullah Shinwari 41 (36); Yama Arab 4/31 (3 overs)		Mohammad Asif 39 (34); Khalil Ahmed 2/16 (2.5 overs)

Hindukush Strikers won by 5 wickets
Kunduz Cricket Ground, Kunduz
Umpires: Ihsanullah Danish and Farooq Khan
Player of the match: Yama Arab (Himdukush Strikers)

- Maiwand Champions won the toss and elected to bat.

Match 11
5 July 2025
09:00
Scorecard

Hindukush Strikers; 145/9 (20 overs)	v	Pamir Legends; 103 (16.1 overs)
Sohail Khan Zurmati 34 (17); Kamil Kakar 4/37 (4 overs)		Haji Murad Muradi 30 (23); Azim Zadran 4/19 (4 overs)

Hindukush Strikers won by 42 runs
Kunduz Cricket Ground, Kunduz
Umpires: Muhammad Sabir and Izatullah Safi
Player of the match: Azim Zadran (Hindukush Strikers)

- Hindukush Strikers won the toss and elected to bat.

Match 12
5 July 2025
13:30
Scorecard

Mah-e-Par Stars; 141/7 (20 overs)	v	Maiwand Champions; 143/5 (18.5 overs)
Farmanullah 54* (37); Naseer Khan Maroofkhil 2/27 (3 overs)		Khalid Taniwal 50 (44); Mohibullah Zurmati 2/27 (3.5 overs)

Maiwand Champions won by 5 wickets
Kunduz Cricket Ground, Kunduz
Umpires: Nasir Khan and Muhammad Sabir
Player of the match: Khalid Taniwal (Maiwand Champions)

- Maiwand Champions won the toss and elected to field.

== Final ==
Final
7 July 2025
13:00
Scorecard

Pamir Legends; 97 (18.5 overs)	v	Hindukush Strikers; 98/9 (19.5 overs)
Noor ul Rahman 31 (21); Dawlat Zadran 2/4 (2 overs)		Zubaid Akbari 26 (17); Arab Gul 2/17 (4 overs)

Hindukush Strikers won by 1 wicket
Kunduz Cricket Ground, Kunduz
Umpires: Mahmood Kharoti and Ajmal Shamolzi
Player of the match: Dawlat Zadran (Hindukush Strikers)

- Pamir Legends won the toss and elected to bat.

== End of season awards ==
- Best Batsman: Zubaid Akbari (Hindukush Strikers)
- Best Bowler: Yama Arab (Hindukush Strikers)
- Emerging Player: Azim Zadran (Hindukush Strikers)
- Player Of The Series: Farmanullah (Mah-e-Par Stars)
