= 2026 Shpageeza Cricket League =

11th edition of Shpageeza Cricket League

- Dates: 1 – 15 July 2026
- Administrator: Afghanistan Cricket Board (ACB)
- Cricket format: Twenty20
- Tournament format(s): Double round-robin and final
- Host: Afghanistan
- Champions: Amo Sharks (3rd title)
- Runners-up: Speenghar Tigers
- Participants: 5
- Matches: 21
- Most runs: Rahmanullah Gurbaz (Mis Ainak Knights) (410)
- Most wickets: Khalil Gurbaz (Mis Ainak Knights) (14)

The 2026 Shpageeza Cricket League (also known as for sponsorship reasons as 2026 e& Shpageeza Cricket League) was the 11th edition of the Shpageeza Cricket League, a professional Twenty20 cricket (T20) league established by the Afghanistan Cricket Board (ACB) in 2013, and the seventh edition to have official T20 status. On 20 June 2026, Afghanistan Cricket Board announced the complete fixtures of the 2026 editions.

Defending champions Amo Sharks defeated Speenghar Tigers by 7 wickets in the final to secure their third consecutive SCL title. Both leading individual stats belonged to Mis Ainak Knights: Rahmanullah Gurbaz scored the most runs (410) while Khalil Gurbaz took the most wickets (14). Ismat Alam of Speenghar Tigers was named as the player of the tournament.

== Standings ==
=== Points table ===
Pos	Team	Pld	W	L	NR	Pts	NRR	Qualification
1	Speenghar Tigers	8	6	1	1	13	1.306	Advanced to final
2	Amo Sharks	8	5	2	1	11	0.042	Advanced to final
3	Mis Ainak Knights	8	4	3	1	9	1.803	Eliminated
4	Boost Defenders	8	3	4	1	7	−0.790	Eliminated
5	Band-e-Amir Dragons	8	0	8	0	0	−2.031	Eliminated

Source: Cricinfo

=== League progression ===
Team	Group matches								Play-offs
Team	1	2	3	4	5	6	7	8	Final
Amo Sharks	2	4	6	6	8	10	11	11	W
Band-e-Amir Dragons	0	0	0	0	0	0	0	0	—
Boost Defenders	0	0	2	4	6	6	7	7	—
Mis Ainak Knights	1	3	3	3	5	5	7	9	—
Speenghar Tigers	1	3	5	7	7	9	11	13	L

Win	Loss	Tie	No result	Eliminated

- Note: The total points at the end of each group match are listed.
- Note: Click on the points or results to see the match summary.

== League stage ==
Match 1
1 July 2026
09:00
Scorecard

Band-e-Amir Dragons; 133/9 (20 overs)	v	Amo Sharks; 134/2 (15.5 overs)
Sediqullah Atal 42 (29); Qais Ahmad 3/18 (4 overs)		Imran Mir 78 (48); Farmanullah 1/20 (2 overs)

Amo Sharks won by 8 wickets
Rahmat Wali Masroor Cricket Stadium, Khost
Umpires: Farooq Khan and Ajmal Shamalzai
Player of the match: Imran Mir (Amo Sharks)

- Amo Sharks won the toss and elected to field.

Match 2
1 July 2026
14:00
Scorecard

Mis Ainak Knights	v	Speenghar Tigers

Match abandoned
Rahmat Wali Masroor Cricket Stadium, Khost
Umpires: Mahmood Kharoti and Izatullah Safi

- No toss.
- No play was possible due to rain.

Match 3
2 July 2026
09:00
Scorecard

Boost Defenders; 153/9 (20 overs)	v	Amo Sharks; 155/5 (19 overs)
Najibullah Zadran 45 (37); Yamin Ahmadzai 3/14 (4 overs)		Abdul Malik 64 (46); Said Khan 2/22 (4 overs)

Amo Sharks won by 5 wickets
Rahmat Wali Masroor Cricket Stadium, Khost
Umpires: Ihsanullah Danish and Ajmal Shamalzai
Player of the match: Yamin Ahmadzai (Amo Sharks)

- Amo Sharks won the toss and elected to field.

Match 4
2 July 2026
14:00
Scorecard

Speenghar Tigers; 180/7 (20 overs)	v	Band-e-Amir Dragons; 158 (19.4 overs)
Mohammad Akram 79 (43); Izharulhaq Naveed 2/33 (4 overs)		Azizullah Miakhil 30 (17); Fareed Ahmad 2/52 (4 overs)

Speenghar Tigers won by 22 runs
Rahmat Wali Masroor Cricket Stadium, Khost
Umpires: Ahmed Shah Durrani and Nasir Khan
Player of the match: Mohammad Akram (Speenghar Tigers)

- Speenghar Tigers won the toss and elected to bat.

Match 5
3 July 2026
09:00
Scorecard

Band-e-Amir Dragons; 114 (19.3 overs)	v	Mis Ainak Knights; 116/2 (9.4 overs)
Azizullah Miakhil 30 (25); Ziaur Rahman 3/12 (2.3 overs)		Khalid Taniwal 53* (22); Izharulhaq Naveed 1/7 (1 over)

Mis Ainak Knights won by 8 wickets
Rahmat Wali Masroor Cricket Stadium, Khost
Umpires: Ihsanullah Danish and Farooq Khan
Player of the match: Ziaur Rahman (Mis Ainak Knights)

- Mis Ainak Knight won the toss and elected to field.

Match 6
4 July 2026
09:00
Scorecard

Speenghar Tigers; 219/6 (20 overs)	v	Boost Defenders; 160/8 (20 overs)
Ijaz Ahmad Ahmadzai 64* (27); Noor Ahmad 2/26 (4 overs)		Ibrahim Zadran 59 (37); Ismat Alam 2/15 (3 overs)

Speenghar Tigers won by 59 runs
Rahmat Wali Masroor Cricket Stadium, Khost
Umpires: Izatullah Safi and Ajmal Shamalzai
Player of the match: Ismat Alam (Boost Defenders)

- Boost Defenders won the toss and elected to field.

Match 7
4 July 2026
14:00
Scorecard

Mis Ainak Knights; 190/5 (20 overs)	v	Amo Sharks; 191/6 (19.3 overs)
Afsar Zazai 44* (33); Qais Ahmad 2/25 (4 overs)		Faisal Shinozada 71 (40); Ziaur Rahman 3/34 (4 overs)

Amo Sharks won by 4 wickets
Rahmat Wali Masroor Cricket Stadium, Khost
Umpires: Mahmood Kharoti and Muhammad Sabir
Player of the match: Faisal Shinozada (Mis Ainak Knights)

- Mis Ainak Knights won the toss and elected to bat.

Match 8
5 July 2026
09:00
Scorecard

Band-e-Amir Dragons; 195/5 (20 overs)	v	Boost Defenders; 199/7 (19.5 overs)
Sediqullah Atal 112 (62); Bashir Ahmad 2/27 (4 overs) 2/27 (4 overs)		Najibullah Zadran 55 (37); Allah Ghazanfar 3/41 (4 overs)

Boost Defenders won by 3 wickets
Rahmat Wali Masroor Cricket Stadium, Khost
Umpires: Mahmood Kharoti and Ajmal Shamalzai
Player of the match: Najibullah Zadran (Boost Defenders)

- Boost Defenders won the toss and elected to field.
- Sediqullah Atal (Band-e-Amir Dragons) scored his maiden century in T20s.

Match 9
5 July 2026
14:00
Scorecard

Speenghar Tigers; 227/7 (20 overs)	v	Amo Sharks; 201 (19.5 overs)
Mohammad Akram 103 (48); Shahidullah 2/28 (2 overs)		Keramatullah 40 (15); Zubairullah Akbari 3/12 (2 overs)

Speenghar Tigers won by 26 runs
Rahmat Wali Masroor Cricket Stadium, Khost
Umpires: Ihsanullah Danish and Ahmed Shah Durrani
Player of the match: Mohammad Akram (Speenghar Tigers)

- Speenghar Tigers won the toss and elected to bat.
- Mohammad Akram (Speenghar Tigers) scored his maiden century in T20s.

Match 10
6 July 2026
09:00
Scorecard

Boost Defenders; 191/3 (20 overs)	v	Mis Ainak Knights; 173 (19.4 overs)
Najibullah Zadran 55* (36); Khalil Gurbaz 1/12 (1 over)		Rahmanullah Gurbaz 87 (31); Abdullah Tarakhail 5/32 (4 overs)

Boost Defenders won by 18 runs
Rahmat Wali Masroor Cricket Stadium, Khost
Umpires: Mahmood Kharoti and Muhammad Sabir
Player of the match: Abdullah Tarakhail (Boost Defenders)

- Mis Ainak Knights won the toss and elected to field.

Match 11
6 July 2026
14:00
Scorecard

Amo Sharks; 169/8 (17 overs)	v	Band-e-Amir Dragons; 138/9 (17 overs)
Hassan Eisakhil 37 (30); Mohammad Saleem 4/40 (4 overs)		Farmanullah 54* (54); Abdollah Ahmadzai 4/38 (4 overs)

Amo Sharks won by 33 runs (DLS method)
Rahmat Wali Masroor Cricket Stadium, Khost
Umpires: Ihsanullah Danish and Farooq Khan
Player of the match: Abdollah Ahmadzai (Amo Sharks)

- Amo Sharks won the toss and elected to bat.
- The match was reduced to 17 overs per side due to rain.
- Band-e-Amir Dragons were set a revised target of 172 runs from 17 overs due to rain.

Match 12
10 July 2026
14:00
Scorecard

Boost Defenders; 185/4 (20 overs)	v	Band-e-Amir Dragons; 184/7 (20 overs)
Najibullah Zadran 64* (35); Allah Ghazanfar 1/21 (3.3 overs)		Sediqullah Atal 62 (39); Bashir Ahmad 3/46 (4 overs)

Boost Defenders won by 1 run
Rahmat Wali Masroor Cricket Stadium, Khost
Umpires: Muhammad Sabir and Izatullah Safi
Player of the match: Najibullah Zadran (Boost Defenders)

- Boost Defenders won the toss and elected to bat.

Match 13
11 July 2026
09:00
Scorecard

Speenghar Tigers; 167/7 (20 overs)	v	Amo Sharks; 168/2 (17.2 overs)
Ismat Alam 42* (20); Gulbadin Naib 3/37 (4 overs)		Imran Mir 88* (58); Faridoon Dawoodzai 1/33 (3.2 overs)

Amo Sharks won by 8 wickets
Rahmat Wali Masroor Cricket Stadium, Khost
Umpires: Farooq Khan and Mahmood Kharoti
Player of the match: Imran Mir (Amo Sharks)

- Amo Sharks won the toss and elected to field.

Match 14
11 July 2026
14:00
Scorecard

Boost Defenders; 178/7 (20 overs)	v	Mis Ainak Knights; 181/7 (19.2 overs)
Ibrahim Zadran 64 (30); Khalil Gurbaz 4/21 (4 overs)		Sohail Khan Zurmati 45* (41); Abdullah Tarakhail 3/21 (4 overs)

Mis Ainak Knights won by 3 wickets
Rahmat Wali Masroor Cricket Stadium, Khost
Umpires: Nasir Khan and Muhammad Sabir
Player of the match: Khalil Gurbaz (Mis Ainak Knights)

- Boost Defenders won the toss and elected to bat.

Match 15
12 July 2026
09:00
Scorecard

Speenghar Tigers; 182/9 (20 overs)	v	Mis Ainak Knights; 165 (19.4 overs)
Mohammad Akram 46 (26); Khalil Gurbaz 3/31 (4 overs)		Mohammad Nabi 90 (52); Ismat Alam 4/25 (3.4 overs)

Speenghar Tigers won by 17 runs
Rahmat Wali Masroor Cricket Stadium, Khost
Umpires: Farooq Khan and Muhammad Sabir
Player of the match: Ismat Alam (Speenghar Tigers)

- Mis Ainak Knights won the toss and elected to field.

Match 16
12 July 2026
14:00
Scorecard

Amo Sharks; 132/4 (14 overs)	v	Boost Defenders
Shahidullah Kamal 60* (32); Said Khan 2/25 (3 overs)

No result
Rahmat Wali Masroor Cricket Stadium, Khost
Umpires: Ahmed Shah Durrani and Izatullah Safi

- Amo Sharks won the toss and elected to bat.
- No further play was possible due to rain.

Match 17
13 July 2026
09:00
Scorecard

Speenghar Tigers; 209/9 (20 overs)	v	Band-e-Amir Dragons; 185/8 (20 overs)
Bahir Shah 56 (34); Salam Khan 2/32 (4 overs)		Barakzai Nasari 69* (42); Ismat Alam 2/26 (4 overs)

Speenghar Tigers won by 24 runs
Rahmat Wali Masroor Cricket Stadium, Khost
Umpires: Mahmood Kharoti and Izatullah Safi
Player of the match: Ismat Alam (Speenghar Tigers)

- Band-e-Amir Dragons won the toss and elected to field.
- This match was originally scheduled for 8 July before being postponed due to the demise of Shapoor Zadran.

Match 18
13 July 2026
14:00
Scorecard

Amo Sharks; 166/7 (20 overs)	v	Mis Ainak Knights; 168/1 (11.1 overs)
Keramatullah 71* (51); Bilal Sami 3/33 (4 overs)		Rahmanullah Gurbaz 107* (39); Mohammad Younus 1/10 (1 over)

Mis Ainak Knights won by 9 wickets
Rahmat Wali Masroor Cricket Stadium, Khost
Umpires: Ahmed Shah Durrani and Farooq Khan
Player of the match: Rahmanullah Gurbaz (Mis Ainak Knights)

- Amo Sharks won the toss and elected to bat.
- This match was originally scheduled for 8 July before being postponed due to the demise of Shapoor Zadran.

Match 19
14 July 2026
09:00
Scorecard

Boost Defenders; 143 (18.5 overs)	v	Speenghar Tigers; 149/4 (14.4 overs)
Hazratullah Zazai 40 (28); Zaitullah Shaheen 3/14 (4 overs)		Ismat Alam 46* (29); Roohullah Arab 2/32 (3.4 overs)

Speeghar Tigers won by 6 wickets
Rahmat Wali Masroor Cricket Stadium, Khost
Umpires: Mahmood Kharoti and Muhammad Sabir
Player of the match: Zaitullah Shaheen (Speenghar Tigers)

- Speenghar Tigers won the toss and elected to field.
- This match was originally scheduled for 9 July before being postponed due to the demise of Shapoor Zadran.

Match 20
14 July 2026
14:00
Scorecard

Mis Ainak Knights; 222/5 (20 overs)	v	Band-e-Amir Dragons; 137 (17.3 overs)
Rahmanullah Gurbaz 102 (41); Farmanullah 2/26 (4 overs)		Azizullah Miakhil 38 (22); Muslim Musa 3/18 (3.3 overs)

Mis Ainak Knights won by 85 runs
Rahmat Wali Masroor Cricket Stadium, Khost
Umpires: Ahmed Shah Durrani and Izatullah Safi
Player of the match: Rahmanullah Gurbaz (Mis Ainak Knights)

- Mis Ainak Knights won the toss and elected to bat.
- This match was originally scheduled for 9 July before being postponed due to the demise of Shapoor Zadran.

== Final ==
Final
15 July 2026
14:00
Scorecard

Speenghar Tigers; 166 (19.3 overs)	v	Amo Sharks; 170/3 (16.1 overs)
Ismat Alam 67 (44); Qais Ahmad 2/16 (4 overs)		Imran Mir 77 (45); Fareed Ahmad 2/35 (3.1 overs)

Amo Sharks won by 7 wickets
Rahmat Wali Masroor Cricket Stadium, Khost
Umpires: Farooq Khan and Izatullah Safi
Player of the match: Imran Mir (Amo Sharks)

- Speenghar Tigers won the toss and elected to bat.
- This match was originally scheduled for 14 July before being postponed due to the demise of Shapoor Zadran.

== Invitational match ==
10 July 2026
09:00
Scorecard

Afghanistan XI; 323/7 (20 overs)	v	Uzbekistan; 124/7 (20 overs)
Hassan Eisakhil 120 (34); Merajuddin 2/54 (4 overs)		Merajuddin 62 (46); Naseer Khan Maroofkhil 2/15 (4 overs)

Afghanistan XI won by 199 runs
Rahmat Wali Masroor Cricket Stadium, Khost
Umpires: Ihsanullah Danish (Afg) and Nasir Khan (Afg)
Player of the match: Hassan Eisakhil

- Uzbekistan won the toss and elected to field.

== End of season awards ==
End of season awards
Award	Prize	Player	Team
