= 2024 Ghazi Amanullah Khan Regional One Day Tournament =

Cricket tournament

- Dates: 10 July – 25 July 2024
- Administrator: Afghanistan Cricket Board
- Cricket format: List A
- Tournament format(s): Double round-robin and final
- Host: Afghanistan
- Champions: Hindukush Strikers (1st title)
- Runners-up: Mah-e-Par Stars
- Participants: 4
- Matches: 13
- Most runs: Rahmat Shah (Hindukush Strikers) (395)
- Most wickets: Naveed Zadran (Pamir Legends) (13)

The 2024 Ghazi Amanullah Khan Regional One Day Tournament was the 7th edition of the Ghazi Amanullah Khan Regional One Day Tournament, a List A cricket competition in Afghanistan. The tournament began on 10 July 2024 and the last match held on 25 July 2024 at the Kunduz Cricket Ground.

== Points table ==
Pos	Team	Pld	W	L	NR	Pts	NRR	Qualification
1	Hindukush Strikers	6	5	1	0	10	0.566	Advanced to final
2	Mah-e-Par Stars	6	4	2	0	8	0.148	Advanced to final
3	Pamir Legends	6	2	4	0	4	−0.274	
4	Maiwand Champions	6	1	5	0	2	−0.161	

Source: ESPNcricinfo

== Round-robin ==
10 July 2024
09:00
Scorecard

Maiwand Champions; 276/9 (50 overs)	v	Pamir Legends; 206 (43.5 overs)
Sharafuddin Ashraf 106 (95); Abdullah 3/40 (9 overs)		Abdul Rahman 47 (53); Nijat Masood 3/32 (8.5 overs)

Maiwand Champions won by 70 runs
Kunduz Cricket Ground, Kunduz
Umpires: Ahmed Shah Durrani and Bismillah Jan Shinwari
Player of the match: Sharafuddin Ashraf (Maiwand Champions)

- Maiwand Champions won the toss and elected to bat.
- Sharafuddin Ashraf (Maiwand Champions) scored his maiden century in List A cricket.

11 July 2024
09:00
Scorecard

Mah-e-Par Stars; 186 (44.1 overs)	v	Hindukush Strikers; 187/4 (43.3 overs)
Naveed Obaid 35 (38); Shamsurrahman 4/43 (10 overs)		Afsar Zazai 64 (97); Zia-ur-Rehman 1/26 (10 overs)

Hindukush Strikers won by 6 wickets
Kunduz Cricket Ground, Kunduz
Umpires: Mahmood Kharoti and Izatullah Safi
Player of the match: Shamsurrahman (Hindukush Strikers)

- Mah-e-Par Stars won the toss and elected to bat.

12 July 2024
09:00
Scorecard

Pamir Legends; 193 (45.2 overs)	v	Hindukush Strikers; 196/6 (48 overs)
Shahidullah 63 (86); Rahmat Shah 3/4 (2 overs)		Abdul Malik 63 (100); Naveed Zadran 2/32 (10 overs)

Hindukush Strikers won by 4 wickets
Kunduz Cricket Ground, Kunduz
Umpires: Farooq Khan and Ajmal Shamolzi
Player of the match: Rahmat Shah (Hindukush Strikers)

- Pamir Legends won the toss and elected to bat.
- Nasir Jamal (Pamir Legends) scored his 2000th runs in List A cricket.

13 July 2024
09:00
Scorecard

Maiwand Champions; 226 (47.5 overs)	v	Mah-e-Par Stars; 228/9 (49.4 overs)
Sediqullah Atal 81 (97); Fareed Ahmad 4/36 (8.5 overs)		Imran Mir 54 (76); Mohammadullah 2/45 (10 overs)

Mah-e-Par Stars won by 1 wickets
Kunduz Cricket Ground, Kunduz
Umpires: Ahmad Shah Pakteen and Bismillah Jan Shinwari
Player of the match: Fareed Ahmad (Mah-e-Par Stars)

- Maiwand Champions won the toss and elected to bat.

15 July 2024
09:00
Scorecard

Maiwand Champions; 172 (46.1 overs)	v	Hinduskush Strikers; 178/1 (37 overs)
Najibullah Zadran 36 (52); Mohammad Gul Alizai 3/28 (8.1 overs)		Abdul Malik 90* (101); Yama Arab 1/35 (7 overs)

Hindukush Strikers won by 9 wickets
Kunduz Cricket Ground, Kunduz
Umpires: Ahmed Shah Durrani and Izatullah Safi

- Maiwand Champions won the toss and elected to bat.

16 July 2024
09:00
Scorecard

Pamir Legends; 265/7 (50 overs)	v	Mah-e-Par Stars; 268/9 (48.4 overs)
Nasir Jamal 59 (58); Zahir Khan 2/51 (10 overs)		Mohammad Ishaq 96* (86); Abdul Rahman Rahmani 2/51 (10 overs)

Mah-e-Par Stars won by 1 wicket
Kunduz Cricket Ground, Kunduz
Umpires: Farooq Khan and Ahmad Shah Pakteen
Player of the match: Mohammad Ishaq (Mah-e-Par Stars)

- Mah-e-Par Stars won the toss and elected to field.
- Masood Gurbaz (Mah-e-Par Stars) made his List A debut.
- Hashmatullah Shahidi (Mah-e-Par Stars) scored his 3,000th runs in List A cricket.

17 July 2024
09:00
Scorecard

Pamir Legends; 254/5 (50 overs)	v	Hindukush Strikers; 255/2 (36.5 overs)
Riaz Hassan 101 (122); Shamsurrahman 3/45 (10 overs)		Abdul Malik 130* (112); Lalbaz Sinzai 2/60 (10 overs)

Hindukush Strikers won by 8 wickets
Kunduz Cricket Ground, Kunduz
Umpires: Mahmood Kharoti and Ajmal Shamolzi
Player of the match: Abdul Malik (Hindukush Strikers)

- Pamir Legends won the toss and elected to bat.

18 July 2024
09:00
Scorecard

Mah-e-Par Stars; 223 (49 overs)	v	Maiwand Champions; 226/5 (49.3 overs)
Bahir Shah 93 (117); Gulbadin Naib 3/33 (10 overs)		Hashmatullah Shahidi 92 (125); Sharafuddin Ashraf 2/32 (10 overs)

Mah-e-Par Stars won by 5 wickets
Kunduz Cricket Ground, Kunduz
Umpires: Bismillah Jan Shinwari and Izatullah Safi
Player of the match: Hashmatullah Shahidi (Mah-e-Par Stars)

- Mah-e-Par Stars won the toss and elected to field.

20 July 2024
09:00
Scorecard

Pamir Legends; 274 (47.3 overs)	v	Maiwand Champions; 240 (46.5 overs)
Darwish Rasooli 148 (121); Mohammadullah 3/51 (9.3 overs)		Bahir Shah 80 (101); Lalbaz Sinzai 3/41 (8.1 overs)

Pamir Legends won by 34 runs
Kunduz Cricket Ground, Kunduz
Umpires: Ahmed Shah Durrani and Izatullah Safi
Player of the match: Darwish Rasooli (Pamir Legends)

- Maiwand Champions won the toss and elected to field.

21 July 2024
09:00
Scorecard

Hindukush Strikers; 264 (48.4 overs)	v	Mah-e-Par Stars; 265/3 (37.2 overs)
Ijaz Ahmad 98 (88); Gulbadin Naib 3/47 (6.4 overs)		Hashmatullah Shahidi 64 (73); Zubaid Akbari 1/14 (3 overs)

Mah-e-Par Stars won by 7 wickets
Kunduz Cricket Ground, Kunduz
Umpires: Mahmood Kharoti and Ahmad Shah Pakteen
Player of the match: Naveed Obaid (Mah-e-Par Stars)

- Hindukush Strikers won the toss elected to bat.

22 July 2024
09:00
Scorecard

Mah-e-Par Stars; 303/7 (50 overs)	v	Pamir Legends; 304/3 (48.4 overs)
Bilal Ahmad 116 (135); Naveed Zadran 3/43 (10 overs)		Darwish Rasooli 143* (124); Zahir Khan 2/47 (10 overs)

Pamir Legends won by 7 wickets
Kunduz Cricket Ground, Kunduz
Umpires: Farooq Khan and Ajmal Shamolzi
Player of the match: Darwish Rasooli (Pamir Legends)

- Mah-e-Par Stars won the toss and elected to bat.

23 July 2024
09:00
Scorecard

Hindukush Strikers; 278/8 (50 overs)	v	Maiwand Champions; 238 (43.3 overs)
Rahmat Shah 96 (80); Sharafuddin Ashraf 3/46 (10 overs)		Ali Ahmad 67 (76); Khalil Gurbaz 5/53 (10 overs)

Hindukush Strikers won by 40 runs
Kunduz Cricket Ground, Kunduz
Umpires: Ahmad Shah Pakteen and Bismillah Jan Shinwari
Player of the match: Khalil Gurbaz (Hindukush Strikers)

- Maiwand Champions won the toss and elected to field.
- Khalil Gurbaz (Hindukush Strikers) took his first five-wicket haul in List A cricket.

== Final ==
25 July 2024
09:00
Scorecard

Mah-e-Par Stars; 307/7 (50 overs)	v	Hindukush Strikers; 309/5 (49.1 overs)
Bilal Ahmad 136 (127); Faridoon Dawoodzai 2/59 (10 overs)		Zubaid Akbari 134 (133); Gulbadin Naib 2/59 (10 overs)

Hindukush Strikers won by 5 wickets
Kunduz Cricket Ground, Kunduz
Umpires: Mahmood Kharoti and Izatullah Safi

- Hindukush Strikers won the toss and elected to field.
- Rahmat Shah (Hindukush Strikers) scored his 6,000th run in List A cricket.
