= 2021 Ghazi Amanullah Khan Regional One Day Tournament =

Cricket tournament

- Dates: 15 – 29 October 2021
- Administrator: Afghanistan Cricket Board
- Cricket format: List A
- Tournament format(s): Round-robin, knockout
- Champions: Mis Ainak Region (3rd title)
- Participants: 5
- Matches: 13
- Player of the series: Shahidullah
- Most runs: Shahidullah (406)
- Most wickets: Noor Ahmad (14)

The 2021 Ghazi Amanullah Khan Regional One Day Tournament was a List A cricket competition that was played in Kandahar, Afghanistan between 15 and 29 October 2021. It was the fifth edition of the competition played with List A status, following the announcements by the International Cricket Council (ICC) in February and May 2017. Mis Ainak Region were the defending champions.

After the completion of group stage, Amo Region beat Band-e-Amir Region in the first semi-final. Mis Ainak Region qualified for the final, having more points than Boost Region on the table after the second semi-final was tied. On 29 October 2021, the defending champions Mis Ainak Region successfully retained their title after they beat the Amo Region in the final, winning the title for the third consecutive time.

== Fixtures ==
=== Points table ===
Pos	Team	Pld	W	L	NR	Pts	NRR
1	Amo Region	4	3	1	0	6	0.837
2	Mis Ainak Region	4	3	1	0	6	0.538
3	Boost Region	4	2	2	0	4	−0.014
4	Band-e-Amir Region	4	2	2	0	4	−0.640
5	Speen Ghar Region	4	0	4	0	0	−0.643

Source: Cricinfo

The top four teams advanced to the semi-finals

=== Group stage ===
15 October 2021
09:00
Scorecard

Mis Ainak Region; 249/4 (45 overs)	v	Boost Region; 253/3 (44.3 overs)
Shahidullah 120* (117); Abdul Baqi 2/57 (9 overs)		Ihsanullah 125 (120); Noor Ahmad 2/40 (9 overs)

Boost Region won by 7 wickets
Kandahar International Cricket Stadium, Kandahar
Umpires: Ahmed Shah Durrani and Ajmal Shamolzi
Player of the match: Ihsanullah (Boost Region)

- Mis Ainak Region won the toss and elected to bat.
- The match was reduced to 45 overs per side.
- Abidullah Taniwal (Boost Region) and Rahmanullah (Mis Ainak Region) both made their List A debuts.

16 October 2021
09:00
Scorecard

Amo Region; 281/8 (50 overs)	v	Speen Ghar Region; 237 (47.3 overs)
Imran Mir 122 (134); Bahar Shinwari 2/24 (8 overs)		Mohammad Ishaq 55 (45); Kamil 2/34 (5.3 overs)

Amo Region won by 44 runs
Kandahar International Cricket Stadium, Kandahar
Umpires: Bismillah Jan Shinwari and Farooq Khan
Player of the match: Imran Mir (Amo Region)

- Speen Ghar Region won the toss and elected to field.
- Ismat Alam (Speen Ghar Region) and Zia-ul-haq (Amo Region) both made their List A debuts.

17 October 2021
09:00
Scorecard

Band-e-Amir Region; 201 (47.1 overs)	v	Mis Ainak Region; 206/4 (43.4 overs)
Zubaid Akbari 94 (113); Ziaur Rahman 4/42 (8.1 overs)		Fazal Zazai 52* (59); Zubaid Akbari 2/18 (4 overs)

Mis Ainak Region won by 6 wickets
Kandahar International Cricket Stadium, Kandahar
Umpires: Mahmood Kharoti and Muhammad Sabir
Player of the match: Ziaur Rahman (Mis Ainak Region)

- Mis Ainak Region won the toss and elected to field.
- Sediqullah Atal and Abdul Rahman (Band-e-Amir Region) both made their List A debuts.

18 October 2021
09:00
Scorecard

Boost Region; 295/6 (50 overs)	v	Speen Ghar Region; 258/8 (50 overs)
Ihsanullah 74 (79); Farhad Momand 3/62 (10 overs)		Tahir Khan 64* (62); Abidullah Taniwal 3/56 (10 overs)

Boost Region won by 37 runs
Kandahar International Cricket Stadium, Kandahar
Umpires: Farooq Khan and Ajmal Shamolzi
Player of the match: Abidullah Taniwal (Boost Region)

- Boost Region won the toss and elected to bat.
- Abdul Naseri (Speen Ghar Region) made his List A debut.

19 October 2021
09:00
Scorecard

Band-e-Amir Region; 108 (28.5 overs)	v	Amo Region; 109/5 (23.3 overs)
Abdul Rahman 43* (55); Ibrahim 3/14 (7 overs)		Abdul Malik 29 (36); Nijat Masood 2/30 (6 overs)

Amo Region won by 5 wickets
Kandahar International Cricket Stadium, Kandahar
Umpires: Ahmed Shah Durrani and Muhammad Sabir
Player of the match: Ibrahim (Amo Region)

- Amo Region won the toss and elected to field.
- Mohibullah Zurmati (Amo Region) made his List A debut.

20 October 2021
09:00
Scorecard

Mis Ainak Region; 253/6 (50 overs)	v	Speen Ghar Region; 218 (45.3 overs)
Shahidullah 71 (84); Aftab Alam 2/60 (7 overs)		Bahir Shah 51 (59); Noor Ahmad 4/54 (9.3 overs)

Mis Ainak Region won by 35 runs
Kandahar International Cricket Stadium, Kandahar
Umpires: Bismillah Jan Shinwari and Farooq Khan
Player of the match: Shahidullah (Mis Ainak Region)

- Mis Ainak Region won the toss and elected to bat.

21 October 2021
09:00
Scorecard

Boost Region; 248 (49.2 overs)	v	Amo Region; 252/4 (47.4 overs)
Ainuddin Kakar 61 (69); Abdul Wasi 3/47 (10 overs)		Nasir Jamal 86* (85); Ahmad Zia 2/53 (9 overs)

Amo Region won by 6 wickets
Kandahar International Cricket Stadium, Kandahar
Umpires: Muhammad Sabir and Ajmal Shamolzi
Player of the match: Nasir Jamal (Amo Region)

- Boost Region won the toss and elected to bat.
- Niamatullah Hikmat (Boost Region), Zubair Ahmadi and Yahya Khan (Amo Region) all made their List A debuts.

22 October 2021
09:00
Scorecard

Speen Ghar Region; 228/6 (45 overs)	v	Band-e-Amir Region; 232/3 (44 overs)
Nasir Khan 81 (104); Shafiqullah Ghafari 2/43 (8 overs)		Zubaid Akbari 105 (108); Batin Shah 1/36 (5 overs)

Band-e-Amir Region won by 7 wickets
Kandahar International Cricket Stadium, Kandahar
Umpires: Ahmed Shah Durrani and Farooq Khan
Player of the match: Zubaid Akbari (Band-e-Amir Region)

- Band-e-Amir Region won the toss and elected to field.
- The match was reduced to 45 overs per side.

23 October 2021
09:00
Scorecard

Amo Region; 253/9 (50 overs)	v	Mis Ainak Region; 259/2 (44 overs)
Farhan Zakhil 57 (48); Shahidullah 2/17 (5 overs)		Shahidullah 107* (108); Kamil 1/51 (6 overs)

Mis Ainak Region won by 8 wickets
Kandahar International Cricket Stadium, Kandahar
Umpires: Mahmood Kharoti and Bismillah Jan Shinwari
Player of the match: Shahidullah (Mis Ainak Region)

- Mis Ainak Region won the toss and elected to field.

24 October 2021
09:00
Scorecard

Band-e-Amir Region; 262/8 (50 overs)	v	Boost Region; 232 (48.2 overs)
Afsar Zazai 70 (77); Waqarullah Ishaq 2/33 (7 overs)		Munir Ahmad 102 (135); Farmanullah 3/43 (9.2 overs)

Band-e-Amir Region won by 30 runs
Kandahar International Cricket Stadium, Kandahar
Umpires: Mahmood Kharoti and Bismillah Jan Shinwari
Player of the match: Zia-ul-Haq (Band-e-Amir Region)

- Band-e-Amir Region won the toss and elected to bat.

=== Finals ===
Semi-finals
1	Amo Region	291/9
4	Band-e-Amir Region	260
2	Mis Ainak Region	294/5
3	Boost Region	294/8

Final
1	Amo Region	74
2	Mis Ainak Region	78/3

1st Semi-final
26 October 2021
09:00
Scorecard

Amo Region; 291/9 (50 overs)	v	Band-e-Amir Region; 260 (48.3 overs)
Abdul Malik 137 (149); Nijat Masood 3/56 (10 overs)		Zia-ul-Haq 66 (72); Abdul Wasi 5/54 (10 overs)

Amo Region won by 31 runs
Kandahar International Cricket Stadium, Kandahar
Umpires: Ahmed Shah Durrani and Mahmood Kharoti
Player of the match: Abdul Malik (Amo Region)

- Amo Region won the toss and elected to bat.

2nd Semi-final
27 October 2021
09:00
Scorecard

Boost Region; 294/8 (50 overs)	v	Mis Ainak Region; 294/5 (50 overs)
Munir Ahmad 65* (69); Khalil Gurbaz 3/41 (10 overs)		Rahmanullah 103* (85); Abidullah Taniwal 2/46 (10 overs)

Match tied
Kandahar International Cricket Stadium, Kandahar
Umpires: Farooq Khan and Bismillah Jan Shinwari
Player of the match: Rahmanullah (Mis Ainak Region)

- Mis Ainak Region won the toss and elected to field.
- Mis Ainak Region advanced to the final as they had more points than Boost Region on the table.

Final
29 October 2021
09:00
Scorecard

Amo Region; 74 (21.3 overs)	v	Mis Ainak Region; 78/3 (15 overs)
Imran Mir 31 (31); Fazal Niazai 4/10 (4.3 overs)		Rahmanullah 25* (33); Ibrahim 1/14 (5 overs)

Mis Ainak Region won by 7 wickets
Kandahar International Cricket Stadium, Kandahar
Umpires: Ahmed Shah Durrani and Farooq Khan
Player of the match: Ziaur Rahman (Mis Ainak Region)

- Mis Ainak Region won the toss and elected to field.
- The match was reduced to 45 overs per side due to rain.
