= Shpageeza Cricket League =

Cricket tournament

Shpageeza Cricket League شپږیزه کرکټ لیګ
- Official logo of Shpageeza Cricket League.
- Countries: Afghanistan
- Administrator: Afghanistan Cricket Board, SCL Department
- Format: Twenty20
- First edition: 2013
- Latest edition: 2026
- Tournament format: Round-robin and Playoffs
- Number of teams: 5
- Current champion: Amo Sharks (3rd title)
- Most successful: Amo Sharks; Speenghar Tigers (3 titles each)
- TV: RTA
- Website: Cricket.af; Shpageeza.af

The Shpageeza Cricket League (SCL, also known as the X-Bull Energy Shpageeza Cricket League for sponsorship reasons and Etisalat Sixes T20) (Pashto: شپږیزه کرکټ لیګ) is a Twenty20 cricket tournament organized by the Afghanistan Cricket Board every year in Afghanistan. The Shpageeza tournament is established with eight franchises, including players from the national team, overseas cricketers, players from the 'A' team the under 19 team as well as elite performers from the respective regions participating in this tournament. In addition, ACB has given the league an identity by franchising all teams while players will be selected through a draft for each team.

The ultimate goal of this 12-day tournament is promoting cricket and sports in general in Afghanistan and establishing peace through sport. The tournament is broadcast live on Afghanistan's prominent channel 1TV using HD quality production standards, and the tournament is commercialized by franchising and marketing each team to a company/organization. Through the design and broadcast of this tournament, Afghans will have firsthand access to watch their national players on their home ground.

== History ==
The League was established in 2013 titled as Shpageeza Cricket Tournament. Five regional teams participated in the event and it was a successful initiative by Afghanistan Cricket Board. The champion of the first league was Speenghar Tigers for the inaugural edition of the tournament. The matches were telecast by Shamshad TV. The second edition in 2014 was conducted with the same number of teams, representing five regions in the country. Mis-e-Ainak Knights won the title championship. Gulbadin Naib was named Man of the tournament; Noor Ali Zadran was the best batsman and Rokhan Barekzai was named the best bowler of this edition. The matches were telecast on 1TV. Starting from the 2017 season, the ICC granted List A status to the Twenty20 domestic competition (List A rather than Twenty20 status as Afghanistan did not have a domestic 50-over tournament). In May 2017 however, the ICC recognised Afghanistan's 50-over Ghazi Amanullah Khan Regional One Day Tournament by granting it List A status and matches in the 2017 Shpageeza cricket league are classified as Twenty20 status.

== Teams ==
Location of Shpageeza League teams

Shpageeza Cricket League was played among 5 regions of Afghanistan but a sixth team Kabul Eagles, officially sponsored by Aatif Mashal was added in the 2015 edition. In 2021, two new teams, Hindukush Stars and Pamir Zalmi were added. Following teams participate in the Shpageeza T20 Tournament:

Team	Region	Provinces	Home Ground	Debut	Wins
Amo Sharks (Amo Nahangan)	Amo	Balkh, Faryab, Jowzjan, Samangan, Sar-e Pol	Balkh Cricket Stadium, Mazar-i-Sharif	2013	3 (2024, 2025, 2026)
Band-e-Amir Dragons (Band-e-Amir Khamaran)	Band-e-Amir	Ghazni, Bamyan, Daykundi, Maidan Wardak	Ghazni Cricket Ground, Ghazni	2013	1 (2017)
Boost Defenders (Boost Satunki)	Boost	Kandahar, Helmand, Nimroz, Uruzgan, Zabul	Kandahar International Cricket Stadium, Kandahar	2013	N/A
Hindukush Stars (Hindukush Stori)	Hindukush	Herat, Badghis, Farah, Ghor	Herat Cricket Ground, Herat	2022	N/A
Kabul Eagles (Kabul Bazan)	Kabul	Kabul	Alokozay Kabul International Cricket Ground, Kabul	2015	2 (2016, 2020)
Mis Ainak Knights; Mis Ainak Atalan	Mis Ainak	Khost, Logar, Paktia, Paktika	Khost Cricket Stadium, Khost	2013	2 (2014, 2019)
Pamir Zalmi (Pamir Zalmi)	Pamir	Kunduz, Badakhshan, Baghlan, Panjshir, Parwan, Takhar	Kunduz Cricket Ground, Kunduz	2022	N/A
Speenghar Tigers (Spin Ghar Zmaryan)	Speenghar	Nangarhar, Kapisa, Kunar, Laghman, Nuristan	Ghazi Amanullah International Cricket Stadium, Jalalabad	2013	3 (2013, 2015, 2022)

== Tournament season and results ==
Season	Final			Player of the series
Season	Winners	Result	Runners-up	Player of the series
2016	Kabul Eagles	Kabul Eagles won by 5 wickets Scorecard	Mis Ainak Knights	Mohammad Nabi
2017	Band-e-Amir Dragons	Band-e-Amir Dragons won by 4 runs Scorecard	Mis Ainak Knights	Karim Sadiq
2019	Mis Ainak Knights	Mis Ainak Knights won by 4 wickets Scorecard	Band-e-Amir Dragons	
2020	Kabul Eagles	Kabul Eagles won by 9 runs Scorecard	Mis Ainak Knights	Karim Janat
2022	Speenghar Tigers	Speenghar Tigers won by 6 runs Scorecard	Boost Defenders	Najibullah Zadran
2024	Amo Sharks	Amo Sharks won by 7 wickets Scorecard	Band-e-Amir Dragons	Zubaid Akbari
2025	Amo Sharks	Amo Sharks won by 8 wickets Scorecard	Mis Ainak Knights	
2026	Amo Sharks	Amo Sharks won by 7 wickets Scorecard	Speenghar Tigers	
