= Ahmad Shah Abdali 4-day Tournament =

- Countries: Afghanistan
- Administrator: Afghanistan Cricket Board
- Format: First-class cricket (from 2017 onwards)
- First edition: 2011
- Latest edition: 2025
- Tournament format: Double round-robin
- Number of teams: 5
- Current champion: Maiwand Champions (2nd title)
- Most successful: Band-e-Amir Region (3)
- Website: http://www.cricket.af/
- 2026 Ahmad Shah Abdali 4-day Tournament

Ahmad Shah Abdali 4-day Tournament is a four-day cricket tournament in Afghanistan played between regional teams, each representing a number of Afghan provinces.

Up to and including the 2016–17 Tournament, the matches were not given first-class status. However, at an International Cricket Council (ICC) meeting in February 2017, first-class status was awarded to all future matches, starting with the 2017–18 tournament. It is named after founder of the Durrani Empire, Ahmad Shah Durrani.

== History ==
Afghanistan's multi-day tournament, the Ahmad Shah Abdali tournament, initially began as a three-day competition hosted in Peshawar, Pakistan in 2011 before being held in Afghanistan for all subsequent seasons. It transitioned to a four-day structure in 2014, with five regional teams competing - Amo, Band-e-Amir, Boost, Mis Ainak and Speen Ghar. A sixth team, Kabul, joined the competition in 2016. The Afghanistan Under-19 cricket team participated in the inaugural 2011 season only. The teams play each other twice before the two sides at the top of the table play for the end of season championship. The competition runs from September through December. In February 2017 the International Cricket Council (ICC) awarded first-class status to Afghanistan's four-day domestic competition.

== Teams ==
Current teams (2023)	Debut year	Wins
Hindukush Strikers	2023	
Mah-e-Par Stars	2023	
Maiwand Champions	2023	2023, 2025
Pamir Legends	2023	2024

=== Former teams ===
Former teams	Home ground	Years active
Amo Region	Balkh Cricket Stadium, Mazar-i-Sharif	2011–2022
Band-e-Amir Region	Ghazni Cricket Ground, Ghazni	2011–2022
Boost Region	Kandahar Cricket Stadium, Kandahar	2011–2022
Mis Ainak Region	Khost Cricket Stadium, Khost	2011–2022
Speen Ghar Region	Ghazi Amanullah Cricket Stadium, Jalalabad	2011–2022
Afghanistan Under-19		2011
Kabul Region	Kabul Cricket Stadium, Kabul	2016–2019

== Champions ==
This table lists all the champions of the Ahmad Shah Abdali Regional Tournament during the competition's pre-first-class era under the 3-day (2011–2013) and 4-day formats (2014 onwards).

Season	Winner (number of titles)	Runners-up
2011	Mis Ainak Region (1)	Band-e-Amir Region
2012	Mis Ainak Region (2)	Speen Ghar Region
2013	Boost Region (1)	Band-e-Amir Region
2014–15	Mis Ainak Region (3)	Speen Ghar Region
2015–16	Mis Ainak Region (4)	Speen Ghar Region
2016	Speen Ghar Region (1)	Mis Ainak Region

This table lists all the champions of the Ahmad Shah Abdali 4-day Tournament during the competition's first-class era.

Season	Winner (number of titles)	Runners-up	Leading run-scorer (club)	Runs	Leading wicket-taker (club)	Wickets
2017–18	Band-e-Amir Region (1)	Speen Ghar Region	Bahir Shah (Speen Ghar Region)	1096	Zia-ur-Rehman (Mis Ainak Region) Waqar Salamkheil (Band-e-Amir Region) Zahir Shehzad (Speen Ghar Region)	55
2018	Band-e-Amir Region (2)	Amo Region	Darwish Rasooli (Amo Region)	1073	Amir Hamza (Band-e-Amir Region)	61
2019	Speen Ghar Region (1)	Amo Region	Najeeb Tarakai (Speen Ghar Region)	828	Zohaib Ahmadzai (Amo Region)	46
2021	Band-e-Amir Region (3)	Amo Region	Riaz Hassan (Band-e-Amir Region)	636	Zohaib Ahmadzai (Amo Region)	32
2022	Amo Region (1)	Band-e-Amir Region	Karim Janat (Band-e-Amir Region)	561	Amir Hamza (Band-e-Amir Region)	30
2023	Maiwand Champions (1)	Hindukush Strikers				
2024	Pamir Legends (1)	Maiwand Champions	Ismat Alam (Pamir Legends)	723	Yamin Ahmadzai (Maiwand Champions) Fareed Ahmad (Pamir Legends)	36
2025	Maiwand Champions (2)	Mah-e-Par Stars	Shahidullah (Mah-e-Par Stars)	541	Sharafuddin Ashraf (Mah-e-Par Stars)	36

== See also ==
- Cricket in Afghanistan
- History of cricket
- Shpageeza Cricket League
