= Abidullah Taniwal =

Afghan cricketer (born 2002)

Personal information
- Born: 23 January 2002 (age 24)
- Source: Cricinfo, 1 May 2019

Abidullah Taniwal (born 23 January 2002) is an Afghan cricketer. He made his first-class debut for Kabul Region in the 2019 Ahmad Shah Abdali 4-day Tournament on 29 April 2019, taking a five-wicket haul in the first innings. He was a member of Afghanistan's squad for the 2020 Under-19 Cricket World Cup. He made his List A debut on 15 October 2021, for Boost Region in the 2021 Ghazi Amanullah Khan Regional One Day Tournament.
