= 2023 Ahmad Shah Abdali 4-day Tournament =

Cricket tournament

- Dates: 10 August – 20 September 2023
- Administrator: Afghanistan Cricket Board (ACB)
- Cricket format: First-class
- Tournament format: Round-robin
- Host: Afghanistan
- Champions: Maiwand Champions (1st title)
- Participants: 4
- Matches: 13
- Player of the series: Aftab Alam (Hindukush Strikers)
- Most runs: Abdul Malik (621)
- Most wickets: Naveed Zadran (33)

The 2023 Ahmad Shah Abdali 4-day Tournament was the 6th edition of the Ahmad Shah Abdali 4-day Tournament, a first-class cricket tournament in Afghanistan that was played in August and September 2023. The tournament was won by the Maiwand Champions.
