= Riaz Hassan =

Australian sociologist (1937–2022)

- Occupations: Scientist, professor

Riaz Hassan AM, FASSA (1937–2022) was an Australian Research Council Professorial Fellow and Emeritus Professor in the Department of Sociology, Flinders University.

== Career ==
In his academic career spanning over 40 years, Hassan conducted research in areas including sociology of housing, sociology of suicide, organisational culture and Muslim societies. He taught at Flinders University, National University of Singapore, Gadjah Mada University, University of California Los Angeles and Yale University.

In 2001 he completed a 10-year multi-country study of Muslim religiosity in which he explored key aspects of Islamic consciousness. In his findings from this study Hassan argued that the genesis of modern Islamism is located in the historical, social, political and material conditions of Muslim countries and the imperialistic policies of Western nations. The outcomes from his investigations have been published in, Faithlines: Muslim Conceptions of Islam and Society (Oxford University Press, 2002), and Inside Muslim Minds: Understanding Islamic Consciousness (Melbourne University Press, 2008). His other recent books are; Life as a Weapon: The Global Rise of Suicide Bombings (Routledge 2010) and Suicide Bombings (Routledge 2011); Islam and society: sociological explorations (MUP 2013); Afghanistan: The Next Phase, coaouther with Shahid Jarvid Burki and Iftikhar Ahmed Chowdhury (MUP 2015); Indian Muslims: Struggling for Equality of Citizenship (MUP 2016)

In 2006 Hassan was awarded one of Australia's largest research grants by the Australian Research Council to investigate 'Suicide Terrorism: The Use of Life as Weapon' which includes compiling data on suicide attacks, and exploring the ideology and motivations of terrorist organizations using suicide missions as a strategy. The grant project aims to advance knowledge relevant to protecting Australia from threats of terrorism and providing information which may contribute to the development of appropriate responses to terrorism. His work in this area fell under the international spotlight when, in the aftermath of 9-11 hysteria, Australian anti-terror laws were established which prohibits anybody, including researchers and scholars, from conducting interviews or having any contact with terrorist groups.

== Awards and recognition ==
Hassan was made a Member of the Order of Australia on 12 June 2006 for "service to sociology, particularly as an educator, author and researcher, and as a contributor to the understanding of housing needs of disadvantaged individuals and communities." He was elected a Fellow of the Academy of the Social Sciences in Australia in 1996.

== Faithlines ==
In 2002 he published a survey of Muslims in Egypt, Pakistan, Indonesia, and Kazakhstan, in which he found that those states with Islamic governments end up with little trust in religious leaders, writing "You can have power or trust, but not both", and concluding that it is best to keep faithlines separate from "the faultlines of the political terrain".

== Works ==
- Faithlines: Muslim Conceptions of Islam and Society (Oxford University Press, 2002)
- Inside Muslim Minds: Understanding Islamic Consciousness, Melbourne University Press, 2008.
- Islam and Society: Sociological Explorations, Melbourne University Press, 2013.
- Life as a Weapon: The Global Rise of Suicide Bombings, Routledge, 2010.
- Suicide Bombings, Routledge. 2011.
- Local and Global: Social Transformation in Southeast Asia, ed., Brill. 2004.
- The Cambridge Handbook of Social Sciences in Australia, co-ed. with McAllister, I. and Dowrick, S., Cambridge University Press, 2002.
- Suicide Explained: The Australian Experience, Melbourne University Press, 1995.
- A Way of Dying; Suicide in Singapore, Oxford University Press, 1983.
- Singapore: Society in Transition, Oxford University Press, 1977.
- Families in Flats, Singapore University Press, 1976.
