= Naveed Zadran =

Afghan cricketer

Personal information
- Full name: Mohammad Naveed Zadran
- Born: 7 March 2005 (age 21); Paktia, Afghanistan
- Batting: Right-handed
- Bowling: Right-arm medium
- Role: Bowler

International information
- National side: Afghanistan (2024-present)
- Test debut (cap 29): 2 February 2024 v Sri Lanka
- Last Test: 26 December 2024 v Zimbabwe
- ODI debut (cap 61): 12 March 2024 v Ireland
- Last ODI: 19 December 2024 v Zimbabwe

Domestic team information
- Years: Team
- 2022–: Mis Ainak Region
- 2023–: Hindukush Strikers

Career statistics
| Competition | Test | ODI | FC | LA |
|---|---|---|---|---|
| Matches | 3 | 4 | 14 | 20 |
| Runs scored | 41 | 10 | 185 | 57 |
| Batting average | 10.25 | 10.00 | 13.21 | 7.12 |
| 100s/50s | 0/0 | 0/0 | 0/0 | 0/0 |
| Top score | 25 | 9* | 34 | 11 |
| Balls bowled | 494 | 66 | 2,230 | 846 |
| Wickets | 11 | 3 | 52 | 31 |
| Bowling average | 30.00 | 26.33 | 28.48 | 24.77 |
| 5 wickets in innings | 0 | 0 | 3 | 0 |
| 10 wickets in match | 0 | 0 | 0 | 0 |
| Best bowling | 4/83 | 3/13 | 6/29 | 4/45 |
| Catches/stumpings | 1/– | 0/– | 3/– | 4/– |
- Source: Cricinfo, 19 July 2026

Naveed Zadran (Pashto: نوید ځدراڼ) (born 7 March 2005) is an Afghan cricketer. In domestic cricket, he plays for the Mis Ainak Region and Hindukush Strikers.

== Career ==
He made his first-class debut for Mis Ainak in the 2022 Ahmad Shah Abdali 4-day Tournament on 31 October 2022. He also played first class matches for Hindukush Strikers in the 2023 Ahmad Shah Abdali 4-day Tournament. He was the top wicket taker in that season.

In December 2021, he was named in Afghanistan's squad for the 2022 Under-19 Cricket World Cup. He picked 7 wickets and his best bowling figure was 2/9 against Papua New Guinea.

He made his List A debut for Afghanistan A against Oman when the Afghanistan A cricket team toured Oman, on 12 October 2023. He also played List A matches for Mis Ainak Region.

In January 2024, he was named in Afghanistan's Test squad for their series against Sri Lanka. He made his Test debut for Afghanistan, against Sri Lanka, on 2 February 2024.
