= Rahmanullah =

Afghan cricketer (born 2002)

Personal information
- Full name: Rahmanullah Zarma Khan
- Born: 18 November 2002 (age 23)

International information
- National side: Afghanistan (2026–present)
- Only Test (cap 43): 5–9 November 2026 v Zimbabwe

Career statistics
Competition	Test
Matches	1
Runs scored	113
Batting average	113.00
100s/50s	1/0
Top score	113
Balls bowled
Wickets
Bowling average
5 wickets in innings
10 wickets in match
Best bowling
Catches/stumpings	1/0
- Source: Cricinfo, 13 November 2026

Rahmanullah (born 18 November 2002) is an Afghan cricketer. He made his first-class debut for Mis Ainak Region in the 2018 Ahmad Shah Abdali 4-day Tournament on 1 March 2018. He was included in the Afghanistan squad for the 2020 Under-19 Cricket World Cup. He made his List A debut on 15 October 2021, for Mis Ainak Region in the 2021 Ghazi Amanullah Khan Regional One Day Tournament.
