= Abdul Rahman Rahmani =

Afghan cricketer (born 2001)

Personal information
- Full name: Abdul Rahman Rahmani
- Born: 22 November 2001 (age 24); Kabul, Afghanistan
- Batting: Right-handed
- Bowling: Right-arm medium fast
- Role: Bowler

International information
- National side: Afghanistan
- ODI debut (cap 57): 11 July 2023 v Bangladesh
- Last ODI: 24 August 2023 v Pakistan

Career statistics
Competition	ODI	FC	LA	T20
Matches	3	11	18	27
Runs scored	10	232	300	106
Batting average	5.00	15.46	30.00	13.25
100s/50s	0/0	0/1	0/2	0/0
Top score	4*	61*	64	31*
Balls bowled	104	1299	832	558
Wickets	1	28	15	28
Bowling average	133.00	27.75	56.00	26.82
5 wickets in innings	0	2	0	0
10 wickets in match	–	–	–	–
Best bowling	1/83	5/19	3/49	4/21
Catches/stumpings	0/–	9/–	2/0	10/–
- Source: ESPNcricinfo, 20 March 2025

Abdul Rahman Rahmani (born 22 November 2001), popularly known as Abdul Rahman, is an Afghan Pashayi cricketer. He made his first-class debut on 16 April 2019 for Kabul Region in the 2019 Ahmad Shah Abdali 4-day Tournament. He made his Twenty20 debut on 13 October 2019 for Kabul Eagles in the 2019 Shpageeza Cricket League.

He was a member of Afghanistan's squad for the 2020 Under-19 Cricket World Cup. He made his List A debut on 17 October 2021 for Band-e-Amir Region in the 2021 Ghazi Amanullah Khan Regional One Day Tournament.

== International career ==
In July 2021, Rahmani earned his maiden call-up to the Afghanistan's One Day International (ODI) squad for their series against Pakistan.

In May 2023, he was named to the Afghanistan cricket team for their ODI series against Sri Lanka.
