= Kunduz Cricket Ground =

Sports venue in Kunduz, Afghanistan

Kunduz Cricket Ground د کندز کرکټ میدان
Ground information
- Location: Kunduz, Afghanistan
- Establishment: 2016
- Capacity: n/a
- Owner: Afghanistan Cricket Board
- Operator: Afghanistan Cricket Board
- Tenants: Pamir Legends

Team information
Pamir Legends	(2024-)
- As of 13 July 2024; Source: Cricinfo

Kunduz Cricket Ground (Pashto: د کندز کرکټ میدان), is a cricket stadium in Kunduz, Afghanistan. It is owned and operated by the Afghanistan Cricket Board (ACB).

The ground held its first List A match in the 2024 Ghazi Amanullah Khan Regional One Day Tournament when Maiwand Champions played Pamir Legends.

== See also ==
- List of cricket grounds in Afghanistan
- Cricket in Afghanistan
