= Abdullah Tarakhail =

Afghan cricketer (born 2000)

Personal information
- Born: 5 December 2000 (age 25)
- Source: Cricinfo, 1 May 2019

Abdullah Tarakhail (born 5 December 2000) is an Afghan cricketer. He made his first-class debut for Kabul Region in the 2019 Ahmad Shah Abdali 4-day Tournament on 29 April 2019. He made his List A debut for Herat Province in the 2019 Afghanistan Provincial Challenge Cup tournament on 1 August 2019.
