= Naveed Obaid =

Afghan cricketer (born 2000)

Personal information
- Born: 28 August 2000 (age 26)
- Source: Cricinfo, 10 March 2018

Naveed Obaid (born 28 August 2000) is an Afghan cricketer. He made his first-class debut for Mis Ainak Region in the 2018 Ahmad Shah Abdali 4-day Tournament on 7 March 2018. Prior to his first-class debut, he was part of Afghanistan's squad for the 2016 Under-19 Cricket World Cup.

He made his List A debut for Mis Ainak Region in the 2018 Ghazi Amanullah Khan Regional One Day Tournament on 13 July 2018. He made his Twenty20 debut for Band-e-Amir Dragons in the 2019 Shpageeza Cricket League on 10 October 2019.
