= Khalil Gurbaz =

Afghan cricketer (born 2001)

Personal information
- Born: 28 February 2001 (age 25); Khost, Afghanistan
- Batting: Right-handed
- Bowling: Right-arm leg break
- Role: Bowler

International information
- National side: Afghanistan
- Only Test (cap 39): 20 October 2025 v Zimbabwe

Domestic team information
- Years: Team
- 2019/20–2023/24: Mis Ainak Region
- 2022–present: Hindukush Strikers
- 2022: Kabul Eagles
- 2023: Pamir Legends

Career statistics
Competition	Test	FC	LA	T20
Matches	1	21	38	30
Runs scored	8	112	60	3
Batting average	4.00	4.30	6.66	3.00
100s/50s	0/0	0/0	0/0	0/0
Top score	6	15	9*	2
Balls bowled	54	3,451	1,761	587
Wickets	0	77	63	41
Bowling average	–	28.16	22.84	18.19
5 wickets in innings	–	4	3	0
10 wickets in match	–	0	0	0
Best bowling	–	6/84	6/37	4/21
Catches/stumpings	0/–	10/–	8/–	4/–
- Source: Cricinfo, 19 July 2026

Khalil Gurbaz (born 28 February 2001) is an Afghan cricketer. In domestic cricket, he plays for the Mis Ainak Knights, Kabul Eagles and Hindukush Strikers.

== Career ==
He made his List A debut for Khost Province against Paktia Province on 31 July 2019 in the Provincial Challenge Cup. He made his first-class debut for Mis Ainak Region against Speenghar Region in the 2019 Ahmad Shah Abdali 4-day Tournament on 15 December 2019. He made his Twenty20 debut for Kabul Eagles against Band-e-Amir Dragons in the 2022 Shpageeza Cricket League on 18 July 2022.

In February 2024, he was included in Afghanistan's Test squad against Ireland.
