= Ismat Alam =

Afghan cricketer (born 2002)

Personal information
- Born: 2 February 2002 (age 24); Nangarhar
- Batting: Right-handed
- Bowling: Right arm fast medium
- Role: All-rounder

International information
- National side: Afghanistan
- Test debut (cap 37): 2 January 2025 v Zimbabwe
- Last Test: 20 October 2025 v Zimbabwe
- Only T20I (cap 68): 24 September 2026 v Japan

Domestic team information
- Years: Team
- 2022–present: Speenghar Tigers
- 2024: Pamir Legends

Career statistics
| Competition | Test | FC | LA | T20 |
|---|---|---|---|---|
| Matches | 2 | 16 | 13 | 39 |
| Runs scored | 125 | 1,163 | 327 | 621 |
| Batting average | 31.25 | 50.56 | 36.33 | 29.57 |
| 100s/50s | 1/0 | 5/2 | 1/0 | 0/1 |
| Top score | 101 | 263* | 100 | 67 |
| Balls bowled | 108 | 970 | 400 | 493 |
| Wickets | 2 | 21 | 13 | 29 |
| Bowling average | 29.00 | 30.57 | 29.38 | 22.68 |
| 5 wickets in innings | 0 | 1 | 0 | 0 |
| 10 wickets in match | 0 | 0 | 0 | 0 |
| Best bowling | 2/51 | 6/46 | 2/24 | 4/25 |
| Catches/stumpings | 0/– | 10/– | 2/– | 18/– |
- Source: Cricinfo, 19 July 2026

Ismat Alam (Pashto: عصمت عالم) (born 2 February 2002) is an Afghan cricketer. He is a right handed-batsman and right arm fast medium bowler. He made his test cricket debut for Afghanistan on 2 January 2025 against Zimbabwe.

== Domestic career ==
He made his first-class debut in November 2022. With the Pamir Legends he won the 2024–25 Ahmad Shah Abdali 4-day Tournament and finished as the top run-scorer in the competition, with 723 runs from six matches at an average of 103.23. This included a highest score of 263 not out.

== International career ==
In December 2024, he was included in the Afghanistan national squad for their matches against Zimbabwe. On debut in the New Year's Test in Bulawayo, he scored a 181-ball 101 whilst batting at No.8 in the second innings, following a duck in the first innings. It was the 11th time a batter had scored a century on debut from No. 8 or below, and the first since New Zealand wicketkeeper Tom Blundell did so against the West Indies in 2017.
