= Farmanullah =

Afghan cricketer (born 2001)

Farmanullah Safi
Personal information
- Full name: Farmanullah Safi
- Born: 14 March 2001 (age 25); Kapisa, Afghanistan
- Batting: Left-handed
- Bowling: Right-arm medium-fast
- Role: All-rounder

International information
- National side: Afghanistan
- Only T20I (cap 64): 11 November 2025 v Qatar

Domestic team information
- Years: Team
- 2017/18–present: Band-e-Amir Dragons
- 2019/20: Amo Sharks
- 2020/21: Kabul Eagles
- 2023–present: Mah-e-Par Stars
- 2024/25: Dhaka Capitals
- 2025: Mis Ainak Knights
- Source: Cricinfo, 20 October 2017

Md Farmanullah (born 14 March 2001) is an Afghan cricketer. He made his first-class debut for Band-e-Amir Region in the 2017–18 Ahmad Shah Abdali 4-day Tournament on 1 November 2017. He made his List A debut for Band-e-Amir Region in the 2018 Ghazi Amanullah Khan Regional One Day Tournament on 23 July 2018. He made his Twenty20 debut on 8 October 2019, for Amo Sharks in the 2019 Shpageeza Cricket League.
