= Zubaid Akbari =

Afghan cricketer (born 2000)

Personal information
- Born: 1 May 2000 (age 26); Nangarhar, Afghanistan
- Batting: Left-handed
- Bowling: Slow left-arm orthodox
- Role: Batsman

International information
- National side: Afghanistan
- T20I debut (cap 53): 7 October 2023 v India
- Last T20I: 11 November 2025 v Qatar
Medal record
Representing Afghanistan
Men's Cricket
Asian Games
Silver medal – second place	2022 Hangzhou	Team
- Source: Cricinfo, 17 October 2023

Zubaid Akbari (born 1 May 2000) is an Afghan cricketer. He made his first-class debut for Speen Ghar Region in the 2018 Ahmad Shah Abdali 4-day Tournament on 22 April 2018. He made his List A debut for Nangarhar Province in the 2019 Afghanistan Provincial Challenge Cup tournament on 31 July 2019. He made his Twenty20 debut on 7 September 2020, for Speen Ghar Tigers in the 2020 Shpageeza Cricket League. On his Twenty20 debut, he scored a half century.
